= 1991 Women's Rugby World Cup squads =

1991 Rugby World Cup Squads
Cwpan Rygbi'r Byd 1991 i Ferched

Tournament details
- Host nation: 1991 Rugby World Cup Squads
- Dates: 6 April – 14 April
- No. of nations: 12

This article lists the official squads for the 1991 Women's Rugby World Cup in Wales.

== Pool 1 ==
=== New Zealand ===
- Head Coach: Laurie O’Reilly

Note: Flags indicate national union for the club/province as defined by World Rugby.

Player	Position	Date of birth (age)	Caps	Club/province
Jacquileen Apiata	Fly-half	10 June 1966 (aged 24)		(New Zealand)
Miriama Baker	Fly-half	1 September 1962 (aged 28)		(New Zealand)
Shona Ballinger	Lock	14 June 1970 (aged 20)		(New Zealand)
Lesley Brett	Wing	15 March 1968 (aged 23)		(New Zealand)
Debbie Chase	Centre	29 July 1966 (aged 24)		(New Zealand)
Donna Ewe	Prop	14 October 1964 (aged 26)		(New Zealand)
Maree Fitzgibbon	Number 8	4 December 1966 (aged 24)		(New Zealand)
Amanda Ford	Flanker	25 July 1970 (aged 20)		(New Zealand)
Deborah Ford	Scrum-half	5 February 1965 (aged 26)		(New Zealand)
Seuga Frost	Wing	19 July 1966 (aged 24)		(New Zealand)
Susan Garden	Wing	2 December 1961 (aged 29)		(New Zealand)
Nicola Inwood	Hooker	24 January 1970 (aged 21)		(New Zealand)
Neroli Knight	Fly-half	13 September 1974 (aged 16)		(New Zealand)
Tracy Lemon	Hooker	1 January 1970 (aged 21)		(New Zealand)
Helen Littleworth	Loose forward	23 April 1966 (aged 24)		(New Zealand)
Helen Mahon	Wing	15 April 1968 (aged 22)		(New Zealand)
Elsie Paitai	Fly-half	20 February 1963 (aged 28)		(New Zealand)
Ericka Rere	Prop	8 February 1963 (aged 28)		(New Zealand)
Anna Richards	Scrum-half	3 December 1964 (aged 26)	37	(New Zealand)
Christine Rodd	Loose forward	31 October 1959 (aged 31)		(New Zealand)
Christine Ross	Fullback	24 July 1964 (aged 26)		(New Zealand)
Nina Sio	Flanker	21 October 1963 (aged 27)		(New Zealand)
Kimi Tiriamai	Lock	5 December 1964 (aged 26)		(New Zealand)
Natasha Wong	Wing	13 November 1967 (aged 23)		(New Zealand)
Carol Hayes	Prop	31 December 1970 (aged 20)		(New Zealand)
Geri Paul	Loose forward	9 September 1965 (aged 25)		(New Zealand)

=== Canada ===
Note: Flags indicate national union for the club/province as defined by World Rugby.

Player	Position	Date of birth (age)	Caps	Club/province
Judi Chalmer	??	8 November 1966 (aged 24)		(Canada) Vancouver
Corinne Enns	??	15 October 1963 (aged 27)		(Canada)
Tina Fuchs	??	23 April 1964 (aged 26)		(Canada) Prince Rupert
Valerie Gompf	??			(Canada)
Micheline Green	??	25 February 1969 (aged 22)		(Canada)
Karine Haimovici	??	2 April 1968 (aged 23)		(Canada)
Ruth Hellerud-Brown (c)	Flanker	22 September 1957 (aged 33)	11	(Canada) Vancouver (c)
Susan Johnsen	??	16 October 1960 (aged 30)		(Canada)
Shelaine Kozakavich	??	27 September 1963 (aged 27)		(Canada)
Brenda McKenzie	??	25 February 1962 (aged 29)		(Canada)
Sandra Muller	Prop	28 January 1965 (aged 26)		(Canada) Ajax Wanders
Patti Pare	??	15 September 1965 (aged 25)		(Canada)
Arlette Peterson	??	4 April 1960 (aged 31)		(Canada)
Denise Petryk	??	14 July 1966 (aged 24)		(Canada) Renegades/Calgary
Joanne Reinbold	??	14 May 1958 (aged 32)		(Canada)
Helen Russell	Hooker	6 November 1964 (aged 26)	10	(Canada) Ajax Wanders
Jill Shapland	??	31 January 1967 (aged 24)		(Canada) Abbotsford
Annette Shiels	??	30 April 1969 (aged 21)		(Canada) Ajax Wanders
Corinne Skrobot	??	8 November 1961 (aged 29)		(Canada)
Anne Stephen	??	1 October 1963 (aged 27)		(Canada) Renegades/Calgary
Valerie Swift	??	7 January 1965 (aged 26)		(Canada)
Susan Tokariuk	??	10 April 1962 (aged 28)		(Canada)
Liz Whalley	??	222 December 1965 (aged 25)		(Canada)
Stephanie White (c)	??	13 August 1961 (aged 29)	17	(Canada) Renegades/Calgary (c)

=== Wales ===
Head Coach: Jim Pearce

Note: Flags indicate national union for the club/province as defined by World Rugby.

Player	Position	Date of birth (age)	Caps	Club/province
Amanda Bennett	Centre	24 July 1964 (aged 26)		(England) Saracens
Ceri Bevan	??	13 October 1967 (aged 23)		(Wales)
Marie Bowen	Prop	27 December 1964 (aged 26)		(Wales)
Lesley Brooks	??	26 January 1966 (aged 25)		(Wales)
Liza Jane Burgess	Number 8	24 March 1964 (aged 27)		(England) Saracens
Susan Butler	??	10 June 1962 (aged 28)		(Wales)
Helen Carey	??	21 January 1964 (aged 27)		(Wales)
Belinda Davies	??	10 February 1962 (aged 29)		(Wales)
Enid Davies	??	20 September 1961 (aged 29)		(Wales)
Heather Devine	??	7 April 1967 (aged 23)		(Wales)
Kate Eaves	Lock	6 May 1968 (aged 22)		(Wales)
Bess Evans	Hooker	3 September 1966 (aged 24)		(Wales)
Bethan Evans	??	17 June 1968 (aged 22)		(Wales)
Philippa Evans	??	23 July 1968 (aged 22)		(Wales)
Paula George	??	20 October 1968 (aged 22)		(Wales)
Sue Glavin	??	28 April 1967 (aged 23)		(Wales)
Eirlys Jones	??	12 March 1970 (aged 21)		(Wales)
Eirlys Ladd	??	27 January 1963 (aged 28)		(Wales)
Jacqueline Morgan	??	27 September 1964 (aged 26)		(Wales) Pontypool
Sara Morgan	??	20 January 1969 (aged 22)		(Wales)
Sandra Phillips	??	4 May 1975 (aged 15)		(Wales)
Carol Thomas	??	24 December 1965 (aged 25)		(Wales)
Julie Thomas	??	11 July 1960 (aged 30)		(Wales)
Ann Williams	??	24 October 1963 (aged 27)		(Wales)
Melonie Williams	??	2 October 1966 (aged 24)		(Wales)
Becky Wyatt	??	17 October 1958 (aged 32)		(Wales) Pontypool

== Pool 2 ==
=== France ===
Note: Flags indicate national union for the club/province as defined by World Rugby.

Player	Position	Date of birth (age)	Caps	Club/province
Christelle Alaphilipe	Loose forward	28 December 1965 (aged 25)		(France)
Nathalie Amiel	Centre	4 November 1970 (aged 20)		(France)
Nathalie Bertrank	??	5 May 1968 (aged 22)		(France) AS Romagnat
Viviane Bonnastre	??			(France)
Myriam Cargnelutti	??			(France)
Annoik Chavernac	??			(France)
Juliette Dal Barco	??			(France) Saint-Orens rugby féminin
Anne Dubetier	??			(France)
Anne Dupont	Lock	29 January 1967 (aged 24)		(France) RC Chilly-Mazarin
Annette Fenoll	??			(France)
Nathalie Francoise	??			(France) RC Chilly-Mazarin
Monique Fraysse	??			(France)
Anne Gille	??			(France)
Sylvia Girard	??			(France)
Marie Gracieux	??			(France)
Annick Hayraud	Fly-half	9 September 1967 (aged 23)		(France)
Christelle Henry	??			(France)
Christine Lavigne	??			(France)
Valerie Lenoir	??			(France) RC Chilly-Mazarin
Marie Mathy	??			(France)
Christine Minelli	??			(France)
Delphine Roussel	??	6 June 1966 (aged 24)		(France)
Fabienne Saudin	Wing	6 October 1965 (aged 25)		(France)
Valerie Sorbier	??			(France) RC Chilly-Mazarin
Sylvie Putin	??			(France)

=== Sweden ===
Note: Flags indicate national union for the club/province as defined by World Rugby.

Player	Position	Date of birth (age)	Caps	Club/province
Britt Ahlstrom	??	16 August 1964 (aged 26)		(Sweden)
Maria Anderson	??	5 September 1966 (aged 24)		(Sweden)
Monika Asp	??	16 February 1970 (aged 21)		(Sweden)
Ann Bengtzen	??	2 January 1965 (aged 26)		(Sweden)
Pia Berg	??	5 November 1967 (aged 23)		(Sweden)
Birgitta Bjorklund	??	23 September 1966 (aged 24)		(Sweden)
Ulrika Blumenberg	??	22 January 1965 (aged 26)		(Sweden)
Jennie Bohlin	??	29 July 1970 (aged 20)		(Sweden)
Britt Fogelstrom	??	2 May 1965 (aged 25)		(Sweden)
Erika Frayssinet	??	23 May 1966 (aged 24)		(Sweden)
Catharina Hakansson	??	13 July 1966 (aged 24)		(Sweden)
Susanna Jaensson	??	20 November 1967 (aged 23)		(Sweden)
Maria Jaki	??	7 March 1968 (aged 23)		(Sweden)
Nina Jaki	??	30 July 1969 (aged 21)		(Sweden)
Jane Jaraker	??	27 September 1968 (aged 22)		(Sweden)
Elizabeth Kaptein	??	29 July 1967 (aged 23)		(Sweden)
Cecilia Karlsson	??	10 February 1964 (aged 27)		(Sweden)
Anna-Karin Linusson	??	12 February 1965 (aged 26)		(Sweden)
Jennie Öhman	Prop	29 July 1970 (aged 20)		(Sweden) NRK Troján
Katarina Olofsson	??	27 April 1966 (aged 24)		(Sweden)
Charlotte Olsson	??	4 October 1966 (aged 24)		(Sweden)
Jennie Palm	??	11 July 1968 (aged 22)		(Sweden)
Asa Ray	??	27 May 1964 (aged 26)		(Sweden)
Maria Spang	??	23 November 1968 (aged 22)		(Sweden)
Ulrika Sterner	??	12 July 1965 (aged 25)		(Sweden)
Christina Svensson	??	27 April 1966 (aged 24)		(Sweden)
Etelka Varga	??	31 December 1963 (aged 27)		(Sweden)

=== Japan ===
Note: Flags indicate national union for the club/province as defined by World Rugby.

Player	Position	Date of birth (age)	Caps	Club/province
Yukiko Dazai	??	11 December 1959 (aged 31)		(Japan)
Masako Doi	??	1 August 1964 (aged 26)		(Japan)
Junko Fukushima	??	9 June 1969 (aged 21)		(Japan)
Hiroko Honma	??	22 June 1964 (aged 26)		(Japan)
Hiroko Ishida	??	26 May 1965 (aged 25)		(Japan)
Michiko Ishida	??	17 May 1968 (aged 22)		(Japan)
Ikuyo Kimura	??	3 April 1963 (aged 28)		(Japan)
Noriko Kishida	??	—		(Japan)
Ayako Masuoka	??	15 January 1962 (aged 29)		(Japan)
Miki Mikami	??	24 February 1958 (aged 33)		(Japan)
Keiko Murai	??	9 January 1964 (aged 27)		(Japan)
Sakae Ooshima	??	3 November 1959 (aged 31)		(Japan)
Noriko Saito	??	13 June 1967 (aged 23)		(Japan)
Miwako Sato	??	7 September 1964 (aged 26)		(Japan)
Meiko Shimura	??	17 February 1959 (aged 32)		(Japan)
Emiko Shiozaki	??	9 April 1960 (aged 30)		(Japan)
Terumi Sugai	??	13 August 1966 (aged 24)		(Japan)
Ayako Tamaoki	??	21 October 1963 (aged 27)		(Japan)
Mitsuko Tanaka	??	25 May 1947 (aged 43)		(Japan)
Naoko Tazaki	??	24 December 1961 (aged 29)		(Japan)
Ami Tsuchiya	??	3 August 1972 (aged 18)		(Japan)
Etsuko Utsumi	??	5 May 1970 (aged 20)		(Japan)
Shihiko Watanabe	??	3 March 1960 (aged 31)		(Japan)
Miyoko Yamashita	??	30 March 1966 (aged 25)		(Japan)
Tetsuko Yasuda	??	11 October 1962 (aged 28)		(Japan)

== Pool 3 ==
=== United States ===
- Head coach: Kevin O'Brien
- Coach: Chris Leach
- Women's Chair: Jami Jordan

Note: Flags indicate national union for the club/province as defined by World Rugby.

Player	Position	Date of birth (age)	Caps	Club/province
Ann Barford	Centre			(United States) Rutgers Renegades RFC
Barbara Bond (c)	Number 8	9 August 1962 (aged 28)		(United States) Reed College
Tam Breckenridge	Lock	1 October 1958 (aged 32)		(United States) Belmont Shore club
Patty Connell	Scrum-half			(United States) Beantown RFC
Jen Crawford	Centre	25 July 1970 (aged 20)		(United States)
Mary Dixey	Fly-half	25 February 1961 (aged 30)		(United States) Beantown RFC
Colleen Fahey	Prop			(United States) Florida State WRFC
Tara Flanagan	Lock	18 October 1963 (aged 27)		(United States) Belmont Shore club
Annie Flavin	Prop	20 July 1961 (aged 29)		(United States) Beantown RFC
Kathleen Flores	Number 8	7 February 1955 (aged 36)		(United States) Florida State WRFC
Barb Fugate	Scrum-half			(United States)
Claire Godwin	Flanker			(United States) Florida State WRFC
Chris Harju	Fly-half	20 May 1957 (aged 33)		(United States)
Tracy Henderson	Centre			(United States)
Jennifer Hertz	Prop	8 November 1964 (aged 26)		(United States)
Elise Huffer	Centre			(United States)
Sheri Hunt	Flanker			(United States)
Patricia Marie Jervey	Centre	29 March 1964 (aged 27)		(United States) Florida State WRFC
Kris Kany	Flanker			(United States)
Cassie Law	Flanker			(United States) Bay Area SheHawks
Krista McFarren	Wing	15 April 1961 (aged 29)		(United States)
Joan Morrissey	Centre			(United States) Beantown RFC
Sandy Meredith	Wing	15 July 1962 (aged 28)		(United States)
Andrea Morrell	Lock			(United States)
Candice Maria Orsini	Centre	9 December 1956 (aged 34)		(United States) Florida State WRFC
Jan Rutkowski	Lock	27 June 1955 (aged 35)		(United States) Beantown RFC
Cathy Seabaugh	Flanker			(United States)
Maryanne Sorenson	Prop	11 October 1956 (aged 34)		(United States)
Mary Gail Sullivan (c)	Fullback	6 January 1952 (aged 39)		(United States)
Val Sullivan	Hooker	17 August 1963 (aged 27)		(United States) Florida State WRFC
Julie Thompson	Hooker	14 April 1958 (aged 32)		(United States)
Morgan Whitehead	Flanker			(United States)

=== Netherlands ===
Note: Flags indicate national union for the club/province as defined by World Rugby.

Player	Position	Date of birth (age)	Caps	Club/province
Yvonne Bouman	??	15 February 1964 (aged 27)		(Netherlands)
Cecile de Klein (c)	Number 8	7 April 1962 (aged 28)	20	(Netherlands) URC
Esther Lichtenbeld	Fly-half	2 June 1966 (aged 24)	29	(Netherlands) URC
Antoninette Geerts	??	30 August 1961 (aged 29)		(Netherlands)
Sofi Hermsen	??	16 July 1963 (aged 27)		(Netherlands)
Margaretha Hibma	??	24 December 1969 (aged 21)		(Netherlands)
Ineke Hoefenagel	??	14 November 1961 (aged 29)		(Netherlands)
Elly Hoogfeld	??	16 December 1964 (aged 26)		(Netherlands)
Renate Inez	??	4 August 1968 (aged 22)		(Netherlands)
Yeke Pasman	??	11 March 1966 (aged 25)		(Netherlands)
Nel Roeleveld	??	27 January 1959 (aged 32)		(Netherlands)
Mariette Schmutzer	??	25 February 1966 (aged 25)		(Netherlands)
Catharina Slats	??	27 October 1967 (aged 23)		(Netherlands)
Annelies Sleutel	??	20 July 1963 (aged 27)		(Netherlands)
Cindy Steneres	??	6 February 1967 (aged 24)		(Netherlands)
Beatrice Terpstra	??	30 August 1965 (aged 25)		(Netherlands)
Jeanette Toxopeus	??	21 April 1964 (aged 26)		(Netherlands)
Helena Van Mens	??	2 May 1965 (aged 25)		(Netherlands)
Ann-Mieke Van Waveren	??	9 November 1964 (aged 26)		(Netherlands)
Ploni Veenendaal	??	19 March 1966 (aged 25)		(Netherlands)
Sanne Veltkamp	??	10 January 1966 (aged 25)		(Netherlands)
Franci Weyts	??	14 May 1969 (aged 21)		(Netherlands)

=== Soviet Union ===
Coach: Vladimir Kobsev

Note: Flags indicate national union for the club/province as defined by World Rugby.

Player	Position	Date of birth (age)	Caps	Club/province
Tatiana Albitova	??			(Soviet Union)
Valentina Andreyeva	??			(Soviet Union)
Olgo Antonova	??			(Soviet Union)
Tatiana Belyakova	??			(Soviet Union)
Anna Borisova	??			(Soviet Union)
Burlakova	??			(Soviet Union)
Victoria Kochetova	??			(Soviet Union)
Olga Kutuzova	??			(Soviet Union)
Svetlana Kuzina	??			(Soviet Union)
Maria Lenskaya	??			(Soviet Union)
Larisa Masalova	??			(Soviet Union)
Roz-Mery-Krosby Mochia	??			(Soviet Union)
Irina Mukhanova	??			(Soviet Union)
Rimma Petlevannaya	??	30 September 1970 (aged 20)		(Soviet Union)
Natalia Prikohodko	??			(Soviet Union)
Yelena Shavrova	??			(Soviet Union)
Yelena Soboleva	??			(Soviet Union)
Yelena Tatarnikova	??			(Soviet Union)
Marina Trefilenkova	??			(Soviet Union)
Marina Vinnikova	??			(Soviet Union)
Larisa Zakharova	??			(Soviet Union)
Natalia Zvyagina	??			(Soviet Union)

== Pool 4 ==
=== England ===
Coach: Steve Dowling Coach: Steve Peters Coach: Simon Crabb Manager: Val Moore

Note: Flags indicate national union for the club/province as defined by World Rugby.

Player	Position	Date of birth (age)	Caps	Club/province
Karen Almond (c)	Fly-half	18 December 1962 (aged 28)	22	(England) Wasps
Val Blackett	Wing		6	(England) Clifton
Gill Burns	Number 8	12 July 1964 (aged 26)	24	(England) Waterloo
Jenny Chambers	Lock	28 August 1962 (aged 28)	8	(England) Richmond
Sally Cockerill	Flanker	5 May 1962 (aged 28)	6	(England) Newport
Jacquie Edwards	Centre	6 September 1968 (aged 22)	12	(England) Blackheath
Maxine Patricia Edwards	Flanker	28 July 1966 (aged 24)	4	(England) Blackheath
Sandy Ewing	Prop	9 June 1960 (aged 30)	18	(England) Wasps
Deborah Francis	Wing	1 May 1964 (aged 26)	12	(England) Richmond
Helen Harding	Scrum-half	4 May 1971 (aged 19)	3	(England) Wasps
Patricia O'Brian	Centre	15 March 1960 (aged 31)	6	(England) Richmond
Carol Isherwood	Flanker	27 July 1961 (aged 29)	8	(England) Richmond
Jane Mangham	Prop	18 March 1963 (aged 28)	17	(England) Waterloo
Emma Mitchell	Scrum-half	13 April 1966 (aged 24)	21	(England) Saracens
Jane Mitchell	Fullback	13 April 1966 (aged 24)	18	(England) Saracens
Nicola Jane Ponsford	Hooker	6 October 1967 (aged 23)	14	(England) Clifton
Giselle Prangnell	Fly-half	19 April 1966 (aged 24)	14	(England) Richmond
Sam Robson	Centre	28 June 1963 (aged 27)	11	(England) Wasps
Janis Ross	Flanker	7 June 1962 (aged 28)	22	(England) Saracens
Cheryl Stennett	Wing	1 October 1962 (aged 28)	20	(England) Wasps
Heather Stirrup	Lock	22 June 1963 (aged 27)	23	(England) Wasps
Sue Dorrington	Hooker	10 June 1958 (aged 32)	12	(England) Richmond
Jayne Watts	Prop	28 February 1961 (aged 30)	12	(England) Richmond
Sarah Wenn	Lock	4 November 1965 (aged 25)	23	(England) Clifton
Claire Vyvyan	Fullback	19 March 1965 (aged 26)	18	(England) Wasps

=== Italy ===
Note: Flags indicate national union for the club/province as defined by World Rugby.

Player	Position	Date of birth (age)	Caps	Club/province
Anna Basile	??	15 December 1957 (aged 33)		(Italy)
Martina Bettella	??	18 October 1964 (aged 26)		(Italy)
Cristina Boncilli	??	15 July 1964 (aged 26)		(Italy)
Federica Bortolato	??	6 October 1966 (aged 24)		(Italy)
Marta Breda	??	25 May 1962 (aged 28)		(Italy)
Paola Brigato	??	26 March 1966 (aged 25)		(Italy)
Beatrice Brocca	??	2 February 1972 (aged 19)		(Italy)
Antonella Castellano	??	23 November 1962 (aged 28)		(Italy)
Wilma Castellari	??	11 October 1962 (aged 28)		(Italy)
Adelina Corbanese	??	28 March 1966 (aged 25)		(Italy)
Teresa Fregola	??	3 October 1963 (aged 27)		(Italy)
Marzia Ghibardini	??	17 September 1963 (aged 27)		(Italy)
Manuela Grifolato	??	19 February 1965 (aged 26)		(Italy)
Sonia Lai	??	29 May 1970 (aged 20)		(Italy)
Silvia Lolli	??	11 September 1962 (aged 28)		(Italy)
Sabrina Melis	??	5 April 1970 (aged 21)		(Italy)
Erika Morri	??	24 April 1971 (aged 19)		(Italy)
Lorena Nave	??	5 December 1963 (aged 27)		(Italy)
Carla Negri	??	10 November 1964 (aged 26)		(Italy)
Mafalda Palla	??	19 September 1955 (aged 35)		(Italy)
Stefania Scaldaferro	??	21 December 1965 (aged 25)		(Italy)
Roberta Segantini	??	8 April 1966 (aged 24)		(Italy)
Flavia Sferragatta	??	4 September 1974 (aged 16)		(Italy)
Sedra Tartagni	??	22 August 1964 (aged 26)		(Italy)
Michela Tondinelli	??	15 January 1972 (aged 19)		(Italy)
Maria Cristina Tonna	??	12 July 1969 (aged 21)		(Italy)

=== Spain ===
Note: Flags indicate national union for the club/province as defined by World Rugby.

Player	Position	Date of birth (age)	Caps	Club/province
Mercedes Vega Muñoz	Hooker	14 October 1967 (aged 23)		(Spain) Alcobendas RC
Arantxa Arana Carcamo	Prop	7 December 1970 (aged 20)		(Spain) Politècnica València
Monserrat Hernández Ibáñez	Prop			(Spain) CEU Barcelona
Lourdes Tendero Granda	Prop	1 November 1968 (aged 22)		(Spain) Alcobendas RC
Nancy Rebecca Villarroya	Prop	15 February 1969 (aged 22)		(Spain) Alcobendas RC
Alicia Yubero Malva	Prop	30 November 1964 (aged 26)		(Spain) Alcobendas RC
Judit Martínez	Second row	1 June 1967 (aged 23)		(Spain) CD Puig Castellar
Paloma Peña Fernández	Second row	17 August 1963 (aged 27)		(Spain) Alcobendas RC
Mariola Rus Rufino	Second row	15 May 1969 (aged 21)		(Spain) INEF Madrid
Matilde Fernández Rico	Back row			(Spain) INEF Barcelona
María José Moyano Tost	Back row	27 November 1961 (aged 29)		(Spain) Alcobendas RC
Rocío Ramón Pardo	Back row	12 April 1967 (aged 23)		(Spain) Alcobendas RC
Lidia Sáez Cami	Back row	6 May 1966 (aged 24)		(Spain) CD Puig Castellar
Eloisa Lorante Catalán	Scrum-half	12 February 1969 (aged 22)		(Spain) INEF Lleida
Rosi Vega Muñoz	Scrum-half	12 October 1970 (aged 20)		(Spain) Alcobendas RC
Mariana Marxuach	Fly-half	12 April 1960 (aged 30)		(Spain) Alcobendas RC
Paloma Loza	Centre	11 May 1965 (aged 25)		(Spain) Alcobendas RC
Montserraz Martín Horcajo	Centre			(Spain) INEF Barcelona
Susana Monclus	Wing	4 July 1967 (aged 23)		(Spain) INEF Barcelona
María José Maiquez Orenes	Wing	19 August 1963 (aged 27)		(Spain) CD Puig Castellar
María Dolores Moyano Tost	Wing	8 November 1959 (aged 31)		(Spain) Alcobendas RC
Isabel Pérez Garrido	Wing			(Spain) INEF Madrid
Beatriz Jiménez Lopez	Fullback	20 July 1970 (aged 20)		(Spain) INEF Madrid
Raquel Arranz Muñoz	??			(Spain) CD Arquitectura
Ana Ayerra Poyal	??			(Spain) INEF Madrid
