= 1994 Women's Rugby World Cup squads =

Tournament details
- Host nation: Scotland
- Dates: 11 April 1994 – 24 April 1994
- No. of nations: 12

This article lists the official squads for the 1994 Women's Rugby World Cup in Scotland (originally scheduled to be held in the Netherlands).

== Pool A ==
=== United States ===
Coach: Franck Boivert

Note: Flags indicate national union for the club/province as defined by World Rugby.

| Player | Position | Date of birth (age) | Caps | Club/province |
|---|---|---|---|---|
| Jos Bergman | Fly-half | | | (United States) |
| Barb Bond | Number 8 | 9 August 1962 | | (United States) |
| Sue Brooks | ?? | | | (United States) |
| Patty Connell | Scrum-half | | | (United States) |
| Jen Crawford | Fullback | 25 July 1964 | | (United States) |
| Mary Dixey | Fly-half | 25 February 1961 | | (United States) |
| Julie Drustrup | ?? | | | (United States) |
| Tara Flanagan | Lock | 18 October 1963 | | (United States) |
| Annie Flavin | Prop | | | (United States) |
| Kathleen Flores | Number 8 | 7 February 1955 | | (United States) |
| Julie Gray | ?? | | | (United States) |
| Betsy Hill | ?? | | | (United States) |
| Elise Huffer | Centre | | | (United States) |
| Sheri Hunt | Flanker | | | (United States) |
| Pam Irby | ?? | | | (United States) |
| Patricia Marie Jervey | Centre | 29 March 1964 | | (United States) |
| Kris Kany | Flanker | | | (United States) |
| Kerry Kelly | ?? | | | (United States) |
| Cassie Law | Flanker | | | (United States) |
| Krista McFarren | Wing | 15 April 1961 | | (United States) |
| Brett Newton | ?? | | | (United States) |
| Christie Nixon | Lock | | | (United States) |
| Candi Orsini | Centre | 9 December 1956 | | (United States) |
| Beth Pepper | ?? | | | (United States) |
| Jan Rutkowski | Lock | 27 June 1955 | | (United States) |
| Maryanne Sorenson | Prop | 11 October 1956 | | (United States) |
| Laurie Spicer-Bourdon | ?? | | | (United States) |
| Lisa Weix | ?? | | | (United States) |
| Amy Westerman | ?? | | | (United States) |
| Alex Williams | ?? | | | (United States) |

=== Sweden ===
Coach: Guy Dinwoodie

Note: Flags indicate national union for the club/province as defined by World Rugby.

| Player | Position | Date of birth (age) | Caps | Club/province |
|---|---|---|---|---|
| Jennie Öhman | Prop | 29 July 1970 | | (Sweden) NRK Troján |

== Pool B ==
=== England ===
Head Coach: Steve Dowling
Coach: Steve Jew, Steve Peters, Carol Isherwood
Manager: Val Moore

Note: Flags indicate national union for the club/province as defined by World Rugby.

| Player | Position | Date of birth (age) | Caps | Club/province |
|---|---|---|---|---|
| Karen Almond (c) | Fly-half | | | (England) Saracens |
| Val Blackett | Wing | | | (England) Clifton |
| Charlie Bronks | Prop | | | (England) Richmond |
| Gillian Ann Burns | Number 8 | | | (England) Waterloo |
| Jane Coats née Mangham | Prop | | | (England) |
| Jenny Chambers | Number 8 | | | (England) Richmond |
| Annie Cole | Wing | | | (England) Saracens |
| Sue Dorrington (c) | ?? | | | (England) Richmond |
| Paula George | Fullback | | | (England) Wasps |
| Helen Harding | ?? | | | (England) Wasps |
| Karen Henderson | Lock | | | (England) Novacastrians |
| Jacquie Edwards | Centre | | | (England) Blackheath |
| Jane Gregory née Everett | Prop | | | (England) Wasps |
| Sandy Ewing | Prop | 9 June 1960 | 22 | (England) Wasps |
| Kathy Jenn | Flanker | | | (England) Richmond |
| Giselle Prangnell | Centre | | | (England) Wasps |
| Deirdre Mills | ?? | | | (England) Richmond |
| Emma Mitchell | Scrum-half | | | (England) Saracens |
| Jane Mitchell | Fullback | | | (England) Saracens |
| Jayne Molyneaux | Wing | | | (England) |
| Nicky Ponsford | Hooker | | | (England) Clifton |
| Janis Ross (vc) | Flanker | | 43 | (England) Saracens |
| Emma Scourfield | Prop | | | (England) Leeds |
| Genevieve Shore | Number 8 | | | (England) Wasps |
| Cheryl Stennett | Wing | | | (England) Wasps |
| Heather Stirrup | Lock | | | (England) Wasps |
| Claire Vyvyan | ?? | | | (England) Wasps |
| Sarah Wenn | Lock | | 25 | (England) Wasps |

=== Scotland ===
Note: Flags indicate national union for the club/province as defined by World Rugby.

| Player | Position | Date of birth (age) | Caps | Club/province |
|---|---|---|---|---|
| Micky Cave | Fullback | | | (England) Saracens |
| Lyndsay Burns | Wing | | | (Scotland) Aberdeen University |
| Sue Brodie | Wing | | | (Scotland) Edinburgh Academicals |
| Alison Christie | Prop | | | (England) Richmond |
| Debbie Francis | Wing | | | (England) Richmond |
| Jeni Sheerin | Wing | | | (Scotland) Heriot-Watt University |
| Pogo Paterson | Centre | | | (England) Richmond |
| Kim Littlejohn(c) | Centre | | | (Scotland) Edinburgh Academicals |
| Elaine Black | Fly-half | | | (England) Teddington Antlers |
| Alison McGrandles | Fly-half | | | (England) Richmond |
| Sandra "Gnomi" Williamson | Second row | | | (Scotland) Edinburgh Academicals |
| Julie Taylor | Prop | | | (Scotland) Edinburgh Academicals |
| Debbie Lochhead | Prop | | | (Scotland) Dundee High School FP |
| Iona Ferguson | Hooker | | | (Scotland) Edinburgh University |
| Donna Aitken | Prop | | | West of Scotland |
| Irene Wilson | Second row | | | (England) Alton |
| Lee Cockburn | Second row | | | (Scotland) Edinburgh Academicals |
| Mags McHardy | Second row | | | (Scotland) Edinburgh Academicals |
| Anny Freitas | Flanker | | | (Scotland) Edinburgh Academicals |
| Donna Kennedy | Flanker | | | (Scotland) |
| Dawn Barnett | Number 8 | | | (England) Wasps |

=== Russia ===
Note: Flags indicate national union for the club/province as defined by World Rugby.

| Player | Position | Date of birth (age) | Caps | Club/province |
|---|---|---|---|---|
| Rimma Petlevannaia (c) | ?? | | | (Russia) |
| E. Solviena | ?? | | | (Russia) |
| L. Evanova | ?? | | | (Russia) |
| I. Erina | ?? | | | (Russia) |
| E. Kvrenkova | ?? | | | (Russia) |
| O. Bogath | ?? | | | (Russia) |
| E. Kostyrko | ?? | | | (Russia) |
| O. Didenko | ?? | | | (Russia) |
| Y. Kirienko | ?? | | | (Russia) |
| S. Krivocharova | ?? | | | (Russia) |
| N. Ivachkova | ?? | | | (Russia) |
| S. Golovko | ?? | | | (Russia) |
| E. Baranova | ?? | | | (Russia) |
| M. Jorina | ?? | | | (Russia) |
| I. Fomina | ?? | | | (Russia) |

== Pool C ==
=== France ===
Note: Flags indicate national union for the club/province as defined by World Rugby.

| Player | Position | Date of birth (age) | Caps | Club/province |
|---|---|---|---|---|
| Nathalie Amiel | Flanker | | | (France) Saint-Orens |
| Valerie Lenoir | Lock | | | (France) |
| Annick Hayraud | Fly-half | | 65 | (France) |
| Fabienne Saudin | ?? | | | (France) |

== Pool D ==
=== Canada ===
- Coach: Ian Humphreys
- Assistant coach: John O'Hanley
- Manager: Rab Murray

Note: Flags indicate national union for the club/province as defined by World Rugby.

| Player | Position | Date of birth (age) | Caps | Club/province |
|---|---|---|---|---|
| Christine Carlson | Prop | | | BC |
| Tina Fuchs | Lock | | | BC |
| Lynne Leclair | Wing | | | BC |
| Patti Pare | Centre | | | BC |
| Kim Styles | Wing | | | BC |
| Vasiliki Antiniou | Lock | | | Alberta |
| Susan Johnson | Lock | | | Alberta |
| Shelaine Kozakavich | Fly-half | | | Alberta |
| Maxi Miciak | Centre | | | Alberta |
| Heidi Von Schoening | Wing | | | Alberta |
| Joanne Gardner | Flanker | | | Ontario |
| Laurie-Ann Lundy | Flanker | | | Ontario |
| Julie Anne McGann | Scrum-half | | | Ontario |
| Sandra Muller | Prop | | | Ontario |
| Nena Orescanin | Centre | 3 April 1969 | 9 | (Canada) Ontario |
| Louise Pearce | Fullback | | | Ontario |
| Jen Ross | Prop | | | Ontario |
| Annette Shiel | Fly-half | | | Ontario |
| Michelle Green | Fullback | | | Quebec |
| Val Matthew | Hooker | | | Quebec |
| Gillian Florence | Prop | | 66 | (Quebec) Ste. Anne de Bellevue |
| Josée Lacasse | Prop | | | (Canada) Quebec |
| Natascha Wesch | Scrum-half | | | (Canada) Ajax Wanderers |
| Heather Wilson | Flanker | | | (Canada) |
| Stephanie White de Goede (c) | Number 8 | | | (Canada) Alberta |
| Helen Russell | Hooker | 6 November 1964 | 10 | (Canada) Ajax Wanders |

=== Kazakhstan ===
Note: Flags indicate national union for the club/province as defined by World Rugby.

| Player | Position | Date of birth (age) | Caps | Club/province |
|---|---|---|---|---|
| Olga Chukreyeva | ?? | | | (Kazakhstan) |
| Olessya Zyryanova | ?? | | | (Kazakhstan) |
| Tatyana Ashikhmina | ?? | | | (Kazakhstan) |
| Natalya Voronenko | ?? | | | (Kazakhstan) |
| Natalya Baibatyrova | ?? | | | (Kazakhstan) |
| Anna Cherkassova | ?? | | | (Kazakhstan) |
| Akkumys Duzelbayeva | ?? | | | (Kazakhstan) |
| Sofya Kabanova | ?? | | | (Kazakhstan) |
| Svetlana Karatygina | ?? | | | (Kazakhstan) |
| Irena Khokhlova | ?? | | | (Kazakhstan) |
| Svetlana Khokhlova | ?? | | | (Kazakhstan) |
| Natalya Kisseleva | ?? | | | (Kazakhstan) |
| Natalya Kosmanova | ?? | | | (Kazakhstan) |
| Oxana Krivec | ?? | | | (Kazakhstan) |
| Olga Kumanikina | ?? | | | (Kazakhstan) |
| Alfiya Mustafina | ?? | | | (Kazakhstan) |
| Anna Nedospassova | ?? | | | (Kazakhstan) |
| Valentina Nezbudey | ?? | | | (Kazakhstan) |
| Yelena Nikolayenko | ?? | | | (Kazakhstan) |
| Elena Onischenko | ?? | | | (Kazakhstan) |
| Oxana Pevzner | ?? | | | (Kazakhstan) |
| Yelena Pevzner | ?? | | | (Kazakhstan) |
| Irina Shabaldina | ?? | | | (Kazakhstan) |
| Yelena Solodovnik | ?? | | | (Kazakhstan) |
| Alfiya Tamaeva | ?? | | | (Kazakhstan) |

=== Wales ===
Note: Flags indicate national union for the club/province as defined by World Rugby.

| Player | Position | Date of birth (age) | Caps | Club/province |
|---|---|---|---|---|
| Amanda Bennett | Centre | 24 July 1964 (aged 29) | | (Wales) |
| Liza Burgess | Number 8 | 24 March 1964 (aged 30) | | (Wales) |
| Kate Eaves | Lock | 6 May 1968 (aged 25) | | (Wales) |
