= Canada at the Women's Rugby World Cup =

The Canadian women's national rugby union team have played 39 matches at the Rugby World Cup. They have featured in every edition of the World Cup, from the inaugural tournament in 1991 to the most recent competition in 2017. Canada has never finished a Rugby World Cup ranked lower than sixth. They have made the semi-finals four times and have contested four fifth-place play-offs, winning two and losing two.

Canada's best performance in a World Cup was in 2014 as finalists. It was their first appearance in a World Cup final. They are only the fourth team to reach the final besides England, New Zealand, and the United States.

Canada hosted the 2006 Women's Rugby World Cup.

== By position ==
World Cup record
Year	Round	Position	P	W	D	L	F	A
(Wales) 1991	Plate Winners	5th	5	3	1	1	80	37
(Scotland) 1994	Shield Finalists	6th	5	2	0	3	105	46
(Netherlands) 1998	3rd Place Play-off	4th	5	2	0	3	52	163
(Spain) 2002	3rd Place Play-off	4th	4	2	0	2	84	94
(Canada) 2006	3rd Place Play-off	4th	5	2	0	3	145	28
(England) 2010	5th place match	6th	5	2	0	3	146	66
(France) 2014	Finalists	2nd place, silver medalist(s)	5	3	1	1	113	62
(Ireland) 2017	5th place match	5th	5	4	0	1	213	60
(New Zealand) 2021	3rd Place Play-off	4th	6	4	0	2	143	104
(England) 2025	Qualified							
(Australia) 2029	Qualified							
(United States) 2033	TBD							
Total	9/9	2nd place, silver medalist(s)	45	24	2	19	1081	660
Champion Runner-up Third place Fourth place: * Tied placing ^{†} Best placing / Home venue

== 1991 Rugby World Cup ==
6 April 1991

Canada	8–24	New Zealand

Glamorgan Wanderers

8 April 1991

Canada	9–9	Wales

Glamorgan Wanderers

Team	P	W	D	L	PF	PA
New Zealand	2	2	0	0	48	14
Canada	2	0	1	1	17	33
Wales	2	0	1	1	15	33

=== Knockout stage ===
11 April 1991

Canada	38–0	Soviet Union

Cardiff

12 April 1991

Canada	6–0	Italy

Cardiff

13 April 1991

Canada	19–4	Spain

Cardiff

== 1994 Rugby World Cup ==
11 April 1994

Canada	5–11	Wales

Edinburgh Academicals RFC

15 April 1994

Canada	28–0	Kazakhstan

Edinburgh Academicals RFC

Team	P	W	D	L	PF	PA
Wales	2	2	0	0	40	13
Canada	2	1	0	1	33	11
Kazakhstan	2	0	0	2	8	57

=== Knockout stage ===
17 April 1994

Canada	10–24	England

Gala

20 April 1994

Canada	57–0	Japan

Melrose

23 April 1994

Canada	5–11	Scotland

Boroughmuir

== 1998 Rugby World Cup ==
1 May 1998

Canada	16–7	Netherlands

Amsterdam

5 May 1998

Canada	6–72	England

Amsterdam

Team	P	W	D	L	PF	PA	Ladder
England	2	2	0	0	147	6	2nd
Canada	2	1	0	1	22	79	8th
Netherlands	2	1	0	1	51	16	10th
Sweden	2	0	0	2	0	139	15th

=== Knockout stage ===
9 May 1998

Canada	9–7	France

Amsterdam

12 May 1998

Canada	6–46	United States

Amsterdam

16 May 1998

Canada	15–31	England

Amsterdam

== 2002 Rugby World Cup ==
13 May 2002

Canada	57–0	Ireland

Girona, Barcelona

18 May 2002

Canada	11–0	Scotland

Girona, Barcelona

Position	Nation	P	W	D	L	PF	PA	TP	Overall Ranking
1	Canada	2	2	0	0	67	0	6	2nd
2	Scotland	2	1	0	1	13	14	4	7th
3	Samoa	2	1	0	1	25	13	4	10th
4	Ireland	2	0	0	2	0	79	2	13th

=== Knockout stage ===
21 May 2002

Canada	10–53	England

Girona, Barcelona

25 May 2002

Canada	7–41	France

Olympic Stadium, Barcelona

== 2006 Rugby World Cup ==
31 August 2006

Canada	7–66	New Zealand

Ellerslie Rugby Park, Edmonton

4 September 2006

Canada	79–0	Spain

St. Albert Rugby Park, St. Albert

8 September 2006

Canada	45–5	Kazakhstan

Ellerslie Rugby Park, Edmonton

Pool A ⇔ Pool D

Pool	Team	P	W	D	L	PF	PA	Pts
A	New Zealand	3	3	0	0	137	7	14
D	Canada	3	2	0	1	131	71	10
D	Scotland	3	2	0	1	56	38	10
D	Samoa	3	1	0	2	32	69	5
A	Spain	3	1	0	2	14	115	4
A	Kazakhstan	3	0	0	3	22	97	0

=== Knockout stage ===
12 September 2006

Canada	6–10	England

Ellerslie Rugby Park, Edmonton

17 September 2006

Canada	8–17	France

Commonwealth Stadium, Edmonton

== 2010 Rugby World Cup ==
20 August 2010

Canada	37–10	Scotland

Surrey Sports Park, Guildford, South East England

24 August 2010

Canada	40–10	Sweden

Surrey Sports Park, Guildford, South East England

28 August 2010

Canada	8–23	France

Surrey Sports Park, Guildford, South East England

Po	Nation	P	W	D	L	PF	PA	PD	TF	TA	BP	TP
1	France	3	3	0	0	55	24	+31	10	2	1	13
2	Canada	3	2	0	1	85	43	+42	12	7	2	10
3	Scotland	3	1	0	2	49	59	−10	8	9	1	5
4	Sweden	3	0	0	3	24	87	−63	2	14	1	1

=== Knockout stage ===
1 September 2010

Canada	41–0	Scotland

Surrey Sports Park, Guildford

5 September 2010

Canada	20–23	United States

Surrey Sports Park, Guildford

== 2014 Rugby World Cup ==
1 August 2014

Canada	31–5	Spain

CNR, Marcoussis Pitch 2

5 August 2014

Canada	42–7	Samoa

CNR, Marcoussis Pitch 2

9 August 2014

Canada	13–13	England

CNR, Marcoussis Pitch 1

Team	P	W	D	L	TF	PF	PA	+/−	BP	Pts
England	3	2	1	0	17	123	21	+102	2	12
Canada	3	2	1	0	12	86	25	+61	2	12
Spain	3	1	0	2	8	51	81	−30	1	5
Samoa	3	0	0	3	2	15	148	−133	0	0

=== Knockout stage ===
13 August 2014

Canada	18–16	France

Stade Jean-Bouin, Paris, France

17 August 2014

Canada	9–21	England

Stade Jean-Bouin, Paris, France

== 2017 Rugby World Cup ==
9 August 2017

Canada	98–0	Hong Kong

Billings Park UCD, Dublin

13 August 2017

Canada	15–0	Wales

Billings Park UCD, Dublin

17 August 2017

Canada	5–48	New Zealand

Billings Park UCD, Dublin

Team	P	W	D	L	TF	PF	PA	+/−	BP	Pts
New Zealand	3	3	0	0	35	213	17	+196	3	15
Canada	3	2	0	1	19	118	48	+70	1	9
Wales	3	1	0	2	9	51	74	−23	1	5
Hong Kong	3	0	0	3	2	15	258	−243	0	0

=== Knockout stage ===
22 August 2017

Canada	52–0	Wales

Queen's University Belfast

26 August 2017

Canada	43–12	Australia

Queen's University Belfast

== 2021 Rugby World Cup ==
9 October 2022	Canada	41–5	Japan	Northland Events Centre, Whangārei
16 October 2022	Canada	22–12	Italy	Waitakere Stadium, Auckland
23 October 2022	Canada	29–14	United States	Waitakere Stadium, Auckland

Pos	Team	Pld	W	D	L	PF	PA	PD	T	B	Pts
1	Canada	3	3	0	0	92	31	+61	16	3	15
2	Italy	3	2	0	1	55	40	+15	8	1	9
3	United States	3	1	0	2	54	68	−14	8	1	5
4	Japan	3	0	0	3	30	92	−62	5	0	0

=== Quarter-finals ===
30 October 2022

Canada (2)	32–11	(7) United States

Waitakere Stadium, Auckland

=== Semi-finals ===
5 November 2022

Canada	19–26	England

Eden Park, Auckland

=== Third-place play-off ===
12 November 2022

Canada	0–36	France

Eden Park, Auckland

== 2025 Rugby World Cup ==
23 August 2025

(1 BP) Canada	65–7	Fiji

York Community Stadium, York

30 August 2025

(1 BP) Canada	42–0	Wales

Salford Community Stadium, Manchester

6 September 2025

(1 BP) Canada	40–19	Scotland

Sandy Park, Exeter

Pos	Team	Pld	W	D	L	PF	PA	PD	TF	TA	TB	LB	Pts	Qualification
1	Canada	3	3	0	0	147	26	+121	23	4	3	0	15	Advance to knockout stage
2	Fiji	3	1	0	2	50	119	−69	8	21	1	0	5	Advance to knockout stage
3	Scotland	3	2	0	1	86	63	+23	14	10	2	0	10	
4	Wales	3	0	0	3	33	108	−75	6	16	1	1	2	

Source: World Rugby
Rules for classification: Pool stage tiebreakers

=== Quarter-finals ===
13 September 2025

Canada	46–5	Australia

Ashton Gate Stadium, Bristol

=== Semi-finals ===
19 September 2025

Canada	34–19	New Zealand

Ashton Gate, Bristol

=== Finals ===
27 September 2025

Canada	13–33	England

Twickenham Stadium, London

== Overall record ==
Overall record against all nations in the World Cup:

Country	P	W	D	L	PF	PA	Win %
Australia	2	2	0	0	89	17	100%
England	9	0	1	8	101	283	0%
Fiji	1	1	0	0	65	7	100%
France	6	2	0	4	50	140	33.33%
Hong Kong	1	1	0	0	98	0	100%
Ireland	1	1	0	0	57	0	100%
Italy	2	2	0	0	28	12	100%
Japan	2	2	0	0	98	5	100%
Kazakhstan	2	2	0	0	73	5	100%
Netherlands	1	1	0	0	16	7	100%
New Zealand	4	1	0	3	54	157	25%
Samoa	1	1	0	0	42	7	100%
Scotland	5	4	0	1	134	40	80%
Soviet Union	1	1	0	0	38	0	100%
Spain	3	3	0	0	129	9	100%
Sweden	1	1	0	0	40	10	100%
United States	4	2	0	2	87	94	50%
Wales	5	3	1	1	123	20	60%
Total	51	30	2	19	1,322	813	58.82%
