= National team appearances in the Women's Rugby World Cup =

Rugby union appearances

This article presents the national team appearances in the Women's Rugby World Cup. The article tracks the appearances, results, and debuts for all national teams that have participated in at least one Women's Rugby World Cup. The 1998 tournament was the first official Women's Rugby World Cup at the time. It was not until 2009 that the IRB officially endorsed the 1991 and 1994 events as "world cups" when it published, for the first time, a list of previous winners.

== Number of appearances ==
Tournament appearances by team, up to and including 2025:

Team	Apps	Record streak	Active streak	Debut	Most recent	Best result
New Zealand	9	8	8	1991	2025	Champions (six times)
England	10	10	10	1991	2025	Champions (1994, 2014, 2025)
United States	10	10	10	1991	2025	Champions (1991)
Canada	10	10	10	1991	2025	Runners-up (2014, 2025)
France	10	10	10	1991	2021	Third place (seven times)
Australia	8	8	8	1998	2025	Third place (2010)
Wales	9	5	5	1991	2025	Fourth place (1994)
Ireland	8	7	1	1994	2025	Fourth place (2014)
Italy	6	3	3	1991	2025	Quarter-finals (2021)
Kazakhstan	6	6	0	1994	2014	4 wins (1998)
Spain	7	3	1	1991	2025	3 wins (three times)
Scotland	7	5	2	1994	2025	Quarter-finals (2025)
Netherlands	3	2	0	1991	2002	3 wins (1998)
Samoa	4	2	1	2002	2025	3 wins (2002)
Sweden	4	3	0	1991	2010	2 wins (1994)
Japan	6	3	3	1991	2025	2 wins (2002)
South Africa	5	3	2	2006	2025	Quarter-finals (2025)
Russia	3	3	0	1991	1998	1 Win (1994)
Fiji	2	2	2	2021	2025	1 Win (two times)
Germany	2	2	0	1998	2002	0 wins
Brazil	1	1	1	2025	2025	0 wins
Hong Kong	1	1	0	2017	2017	0 wins

== Results by tournament ==
- – Not invited / Did not enter or withdrew from qualifying
- Q – Qualified
- • – Did not qualify
- W – Withdrew from final tournament
- – Hosts

For each tournament, the number of teams in each finals tournament (in brackets) are shown. Only teams that have played in at least one tournament are shown. Teams that have only participated in qualifying are not shown.

Team	1991 (12)	1994 (12)	1998 (16)	2002 (16)	2006 (12)	2010 (12)	2014 (12)	2017 (12)	2021 (12)	2025 (16)	2029	2033
Africa
South Africa					12th	10th	10th		11th	6th		
Asia
Hong Kong				•	•	•	•	12th	W	•		
Japan	11th	8th		13th	•	•	•	11th	12th	11th		
Kazakhstan		9th	9th	11th	11th	11th	12th		•	•		
Europe
England	2nd	1st	3rd	2nd	2nd	2nd	1st	2nd	2nd	1st	Q	
France	3rd	3rd	8th	3rd	3rd	4th	3rd	3rd	3rd	4th	Q	
Germany		W	14th	16th		•						
Ireland		7th	10th	14th	8th	7th	4th	8th	•	5th		
Italy	8th	W	12th	12th		•	•	9th	5th	10th		
Netherlands	7th		13th	15th	W	•	•	•	•	•		
Russia	11th (Note: As the Soviet Union)	11th	16th			•	•	•	•			
Scotland		5th	6th	6th	6th	8th	•	•	10th	7th		
Spain	6th	W	7th	8th	9th	•	9th	10th	•	14th		
Sweden	10th	10th	15th			12th	•					
Wales	9th	4th	11th	10th		9th	8th	7th	8th	13th		
North America
Canada	5th	6th	4th	4th	4th	4th	2nd	5th	4th	2nd	Q	
United States	1st	2nd	2nd	5th	5th	5th	6th	4th	7th	9th		Q
Oceania
Australia			5th	7th	7th	3rd	7th	6th	9th	8th	Q	
Fiji						W		•	9th	12th		
New Zealand	3rd	W	1st	1st	1st	1st	5th	1st	1st	3rd	Q	
Samoa				9th	10th	•	11th		W	16th		
South America
Brazil									•	15th		

== Debut of national teams ==
21 nations have thus far qualified for the Women's Rugby World Cup. From 1991 until 2006, each edition featured at least one new country. The 2010 tournament was the first edition with no debutant.

Year	Nation(s)	Total
1991	Canada; England; France; Italy; Japan; Netherlands; New Zealand; Russia; Spain; Sweden; United States; Wales	12
1994	Ireland; Kazakhstan; Scotland	3
1998	Australia; Germany	2
2002	Samoa	1
2006	South Africa	1
2010	None	0
2014	None	0
2017	Hong Kong	1
2021	Fiji	1
2025	Brazil	1

== Result of host nations ==
The best result by the hosts is champions, achieved by New Zealand in 2021 and England in 2025. The worst result was by the Netherlands in 1998.

Year	Host nation	Finish
1991	Wales	9th place
1994	Scotland	5th place
1998	Netherlands	13th place
2002	Spain	8th place
2006	Canada	Fourth place
2010	England	Runners-up
2014	France	Third place
2017	Ireland	8th place
2021	New Zealand	Champions
2025	England	Champions
2029	Australia	To be determined
2033	United States	To be determined

== Results of defending champions ==
Year	Defending champions	Finish
1994	United States	Runners-up
1998	England	Third place
2002	New Zealand	Champions
2006	New Zealand	Champions
2010	New Zealand	Champions
2014	New Zealand	5th Place
2017	England	Runners-up
2021	New Zealand	Champions
2025	New Zealand	Third place
2029	England	To be determined

== Performance by confederation ==
This is a summary of the best performances of each confederation in each tournament.

Confederation	1991 (12)	1994 (12)	1998 (16)	2002 (16)	2006 (12)	2010 (12)	2014 (12)	2017 (12)	2021 (12)	2025 (16)	2029	2033
Africa	—	—	—	—	12th	10th	10th	—	11th	6th	TBD	TBD
Asia	11th	8th	9th	11th	11th	11th	12th	11th	12th	11th	TBD	TBD
Europe	2nd	1st	3rd	2nd	2nd	2nd	1st	2nd	2nd	1st	TBD	TBD
North America	1st	2nd	2nd	4th	4th	4th	2nd	4th	4th	2nd	TBD	TBD
Oceania	3rd	—	1st	1st	1st	1st	5th	1st	1st	3rd	TBD	TBD
South America	—	—	—	—	—	—	—	—	—	15th	TBD	TBD

== Number of teams by confederation ==
This is a summary of the total number of participating teams by confederation in each tournament.

Confederation	1991 (12)	1994 (12)	1998 (16)	2002 (16)	2006 (12)	2010 (12)	2014 (12)	2017 (12)	2021 (12)	2025 (16)	2029	2033
Africa	0	0	0	0	1	1	1	0	1	1	TBD	TBD
Asia	1	2	1	2	1	1	1	2	1	1	TBD	TBD
Europe	8	7	11	9	5	6	5	6	5	7	TBD	TBD
North America	2	2	2	2	2	2	2	2	2	2	TBD	TBD
Oceania	1	0	2	3	3	2	3	2	3	4	TBD	TBD
South America	0	0	0	0	0	0	0	0	0	1	TBD	TBD

== Appearance droughts ==
This section is a list of droughts associated with the participation of women's national rugby union teams in the Women's Rugby World Cups.

=== Longest active droughts ===
Does not include teams that have not yet made their first appearance or teams that no longer exist.

Team	Last appearance	WC missed
Russia	1998	7
Germany	2002	6
Netherlands	2002	6
Sweden	2010	4
Kazakhstan	2014	3
Hong Kong	2017	2

=== Longest droughts overall ===
Only includes droughts begun after a team's first appearance. Updated to include qualification for the 2025 Women's Rugby World Cup. Only teams that have missed a minimum of two world cups are listed.

Team	Prev. appearance	Next appearance	WC missed
Russia	1998	Active	7
Germany	2002	Active	6
Netherlands	2002	Active	6
Sweden	2010	Active	4
Japan	2002	2017	3
Italy	2002	2017	3
Kazakhstan	2014	Active	3
Samoa	2014	2025	2
Scotland	2010	2021	2
Hong Kong	2017	Active	2
