= Christine Rodd =

New Zealand rugby union player

- Born: 31 October 1959 (age 67) Methven, New Zealand
- Height: 1.76 m (5 ft 9 in)

Rugby union career
- Position: Lock
Provincial / State sides
Years	Team	Apps	(Points)
- Canterbury
International career
Years	Team	Apps	(Points)
1990–1991	New Zealand	7	(0)

Christine Rodd (born 31 October 1959) is a former New Zealand rugby union player. She made her Black Ferns debut on 26 August at RugbyFest 1990 against the Netherlands at Ashburton, she also played for the Crusadettes and Canterbury at the tournament.

Rodd attended the inaugural World Cup in 1991, she was named as a reserve for the opening match against Canada, but did not get to play. She was a replacement in the 24–6 victory over Wales and started in the semi-final defeat against the United States on 12 April at Cardiff. The match against the United States was her last international appearance.
