= Lesley Brett =

New Zealand rugby player

- Born: 15 March 1968 (age 58)
- Height: 1.68 m (5 ft 6 in)

Rugby union career
International career
| Years | Team | Apps | (Points) |
| 1990–1991 | New Zealand | 7 | (28) |

Lesley Simpson (née Brett; born 15 March 1968) is a former New Zealand rugby union player. She made her Black Ferns debut at RugbyFest 1990 against Netherlands. Brett competed at the 1991 Women's Rugby World Cup; she scored a hat-trick in their game against Wales.

== Personal life ==
Brett is the mother of former Crusaders and Blues fly-half, Stephen Brett. She was married to former All Black, Victor Simpson.
