= Maree Fitzgibbon =

New Zealand rugby union player (born 1966)

- Born: 4 December 1966 (age 59) Leeston, New Zealand
- Height: 1.7 m (5 ft 7 in)

Rugby union career
Provincial / State sides
Years	Team	Apps	(Points)
	Canterbury		(0)
International career
Years	Team	Apps	(Points)
1991	New Zealand	3	(0)

Maree Fitzgibbon (born 4 December 1966) is a former New Zealand rugby union player. She represented New Zealand at the inaugural 1991 Women's Rugby World Cup in Wales.

== Rugby career ==
Fitzgibbon was born in Leeston and educated at Cheviot Area School and the Christchurch College of Education. She made her Black Ferns debut on 22 July 1989 against the California Grizzlies at Christchurch. She scored the winning try in her sides 13–7 victory.

She competed at RugbyFest 1990 that was hosted by New Zealand. She featured in the games against the Netherlands, United States and a World XVs side.

Fitzgibbon was a member of the Black Ferns squad to the 1991 Women's Rugby World Cup in Wales.
