= Debbie Chase =

New Zealand rugby player

- Born: 29 July 1966 (age 60) Kawerau, New Zealand
- Height: 1.68 m (5 ft 6 in)

Rugby union career
- Position: Centre
Provincial / State sides
Years	Team	Apps	(Points)
- Canterbury
International career
Years	Team	Apps	(Points)
1990–1991	New Zealand	11	(37)

Debbie Chase (born 29 July 1966) is a former rugby union player. She debuted for the Black Ferns against the Netherlands at the RugbyFest 1990. She led the first haka to be performed by a women's team at the 1991 Women's Rugby World Cup.

== Career ==
Chase has represented New Zealand in three different codes; rugby union, rugby league and softball. She has also represented Canterbury in athletics, volleyball, basketball, rugby sevens, football and volleyball.

In 1998, she was a part of the Kiwi Ferns that beat a touring Great Britain in a three test series.
