= Ericka Rere =

- Born: Ericka Ramarie Ratu; 8 February 1963 (age 63) Whakatāne, New Zealand
- Height: 1.68 m (5 ft 6 in)
- School: Ōpōtiki College

Rugby union career
Provincial / State sides
Years	Team	Apps	(Points)
- Wellington
-	Bay of Plenty		
International career
Years	Team	Apps	(Points)
1990–1993	New Zealand	10	(0)

Ericka Ramarie Rere (née Ratu, born 8 February 1963) is a former New Zealand rugby union player. She made her debut for New Zealand at RugbyFest 1990, playing against the Netherlands at Ashburton. She was selected for the 1991 Women's Rugby World Cup squad and started in every game.
