= Cecile de Klein =

Soil and environmental scientist in New Zealand

Cecile de Klein FRSNZ
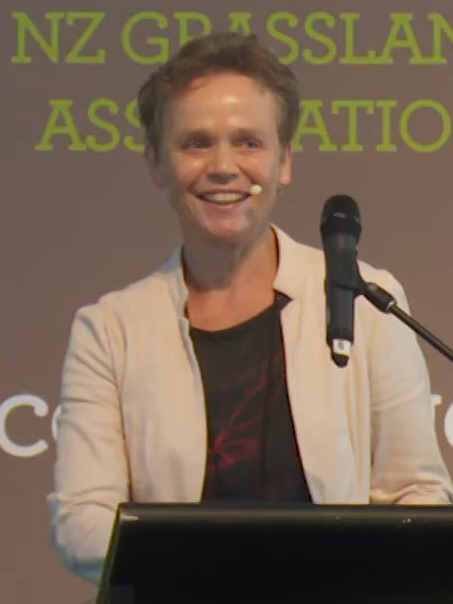
- Born: 1962
- Occupations: Environmental and soil scientist
- Awards: Fellow of the Royal Society Te Apārangi

Academic background
- Education: University of Utrecht

Cecile de Klein FRSNZ (born 1962) is a Dutch–New Zealand scientist at the New Zealand Institute for Bioeconomy Science, specialising in soil and environmental science. In 2026, de Klein was elected a Fellow of the Royal Society Te Apārangi. De Klein also captained the Dutch women's rugby team at the 1991 Women's Rugby World Cup.

== Research career ==
De Klein completed a master's degree in biology in 1988 and then a PhD in landscape ecology at the University of Utrecht in 1993. She then undertook postdoctoral research in the UK, working with ADAS, an agricultural and environmental consultancy. De Klein emigrated to New Zealand with her husband in 1995, where she joined AgResearch (later absorbed into the New Zealand Institute for Bioeconomy Science), based at the Invermay Agricultural Centre near Mosgiel.

De Klein works on reducing greenhouse gas emissions from farming, especially emissions from grazed livestock systems. She researched nitrogen cycling, and developed methods of accurately measuring nitrous-oxide emissions, leading to better reporting of New Zealand's emissions. De Klein has advocated for 'living labs', which place farmers and researchers together in regional hubs, to test and refine solutions to greenhouse gas emission problems in real-life situations that reflect regional variations in conditions.

In 2024, de Klein was appointed by MBIE as a Horizon Europe National Contact Point for New Zealand, covering the areas of food, bioeconomy, natural resources, agriculture and environment. National Contact Points assist potential applicants to prepare research consortia for the Horizon Europe funding programme.

De Klein was the keynote speaker at the XXII N Workshop Resolving the Global Nitrogen Dilemma - Opportunities and Challenges in Aarhus in 2024. In 2026, de Klein was elected a Fellow of the Royal Society Te Apārangi.

== Sports career ==
De Klein played rugby for eleven years, and captained the Dutch women's team, playing at number eight, in the inaugural Women's Rugby World Cup in Wales in 1991.

== Selected works ==
- R.J. Eckard; C. Grainger; Klein, Cecile (2010). "Options for the abatement of methane and nitrous oxide from ruminant production: A review". Livestock Science. 130 (1–3): 47–56. doi:10.1016/j.livsci.2010.02.010. Wikidata Q55882092.
- Klein, Cecile; L. Barton; R.R. Sherlock; Z. Li; R.P. Littlejohn (2003). "Estimating a nitrous oxide emission factor for animal urine from some New Zealand pastoral soils". Soil Research. 41 (3): 381–399. ISSN 0004-9573. Wikidata Q137388205.
- Klein, Cecile; R. J. Eckard (2008). "Targeted technologies for nitrous oxide abatement from animal agriculture". Australian Journal of Experimental Agriculture. 48 (2): 14. doi:10.1071/ea07217. Wikidata Q138562050.
- J. Luo; Klein, Cecile; S.F. Ledgard; S. Saggar (2010). "Management options to reduce nitrous oxide emissions from intensively grazed pastures: A review". Agriculture. 136 (3–4): 282–291. doi:10.1016/j.agee.2009.12.003. Wikidata Q58294218.
- Klein, Cecile; Robert R. Sherlock; Keith C. Cameron; Tony J. van der Weerden (2001). "Nitrous oxide emissions from agricultural soils in New Zealand—A review of current knowledge and directions for future research". Journal of the Royal Society of New Zealand. 31 (3): 543–574. doi:10.1080/03014223.2001.9517667. Wikidata Q138562058.
- Klein, Cecile; L.C. Smith; R.M. Monaghan (2006). "Restricted autumn grazing to reduce nitrous oxide emissions from dairy pastures in Southland, New Zealand". Agriculture. 112 (2–3): 192–199. doi:10.1016/j.agee.2005.08.019. Wikidata Q138562061.
- Klein, Cecile; R.S.P. Van Logtestijn (1996). "Denitrification in grassland soils in The Netherlands in relation to irrigation, N-application rate, soil water content and soil temperature". Soil Biology and Biochemistry. 28 (2): 231–237. doi:10.1016/0038-0717(95)00131-x. Wikidata Q138562062.
