= Mary Sullivan =

Mary Sullivan may refer to:

- Mary Sullivan (murder victim) (1944–1964), American victim in the Boston Strangler case
- Mary Sullivan (netball) (1920–1977), New Zealand netball player
- Mary A. Sullivan (1878/1879–1950), American police detective
- Mary Ann Sullivan (born 1959), American politician (former member of the Indiana House of Representatives)
- Mary Gail Sullivan (born 1952), American former rugby union player
- Mary Quinn Sullivan (1877–1939), American art collector
- Mary Sullivan (politician), member of the Vermont House of Representatives

== See also ==
- Mary O'Sullivan (disambiguation)
