= Seuga Frost =

- Born: 19 July 1966 (age 60) Wellington, New Zealand
- Height: 1.65 m (5 ft 5 in)

Rugby union career
Provincial / State sides
Years	Team	Apps	(Points)
	Canterbury		(0)
International career
Years	Team	Apps	(Points)
1990–1991	New Zealand	3	(0)

Seuga Frost (born 19 July 1966) is a former New Zealand rugby union player. She played for the Black Ferns and Canterbury. She made her debut for New Zealand at RugbyFest 1990 against the Netherlands on 26 August 1990 at Ashburton. She was selected for the 1991 Women's Rugby World Cup squad, but did not get to play at the World Cup.
