= Neroli Matautia =

- Born: September 13, 1974 (age 52)
- Height: 1.56 m (5 ft 1 in)
- Weight: 70 kg (154 lb)

Rugby union career
- Position: Fly-half
Provincial / State sides
Years	Team	Apps	(Points)
	Wellington		(161)
International career
Years	Team	Apps	(Points)
1990—2001	New Zealand	6	(0)

Neroli Matautia (née Knight, b. September 13, 1974) is a former New Zealand rugby union player. At the age of 15, she made her debut for the Black Ferns against the Netherlands on 26 August 1990 at the RugbyFest in Christchurch.

Matautia was selected for the 1991 World Cup. She suffered a hamstring injury in a warm-up match against Saracens which ruled her out of the tournament. She managed to play in their third-place playoff match against France, which New Zealand lost 3–0. Matautia played 14 seasons for Wellington, scoring 161 points.

In 1999, she earned her official test cap against Canada. Matautia played her last test match against England in 2001. In 2009, she married her husband, Waihi church pastor Benhur Matautia.
