= Rimma Petlevannaya =

Russian rugby union player

- Born: 30 September 1970 (age 56)
- Height: 168 cm (5 ft 6 in)
- Weight: 70 kg (154 lb; 11 st 0 lb)

Rugby union career
- Position: Fly-half
Senior career
Years	Team	Apps	(Points)
	Murrayfield Wanderers		(0)
International career
Years	Team	Apps	(Points)
1991–?	Soviet Union		(0)
1996–2006	Scotland	78	(0)

Rimma Petlevannaya (born September 30, 1970) is a Russian and Scottish former rugby union player. She played Fly-half for the Soviet Union and then Scotland.

== Career ==
Petlevannaya competed at the 1991 Women's Rugby World Cup for the Soviet Union. She later moved to Scotland and became a Scottish international. She made her international debut for Scotland against the Netherlands in November 1996.

Petlevannaya competed at the 2001 FIRA Women's European Championship, with the champion side. She also competed at the 2002 Women's Rugby World Cup, for Scotland. She was part of the team that traveled to Edmonton in Canada to achieve the best possible result at the 2006 Women's Rugby World Cup.

Petlevannaya has 78 caps as of 15 August 2006. She played club rugby for Murrayfield Wanderers. She also had the honor of wearing the colors of the British and Irish Lionesses.
