= Gill Burns =

England international rugby union player

Gill Burns MBE
- Born: 12 July 1964 (age 62)
- Height: 1.80 m (5 ft 11 in)
- Weight: 90 kg (200 lb; 14 st 2 lb)

Rugby union career
International career
Years	Team	Apps	(Points)
1988–2002	England	73	
National sevens team
Years	Team		Comps
- England
Medal record
Representing England
Women's rugby union
Rugby World Cup
Gold medal – first place	1994 Scotland	Team competition
Silver medal – second place	2002 Spain	Team competition
Silver medal – second place	1991 Wales	Team competition
Bronze medal – third place	1998 Netherlands	Team competition

Gillian Ann Burns MBE (born 12 July 1964) is a former rugby union player who represented England between 1988 and 2002, including when they won the 1994 Women's Rugby World Cup. She also captained her country between 1994 and 1999. She was selected for England only one year after first playing rugby union. She went on to play in four World Cups, including the inaugural Women's Rugby World Cup – hosted by Wales in 1991 – where England lost to the United States 19–6. Burns was also appointed a Member of the Order of the British Empire (MBE) in the 2005 Birthday Honours for services to sport.

One season after retiring from the England squad, Burns was asked to captain the first ever Women's World XV for their 2 test series in New Zealand.

After retiring as a player, Burns was appointed President of the Rugby Football Union for Women – who helped administer the Women's game in England – and also worked briefly as a guest commentator for Sky Sports. Burns was the first woman to be made a Privileged Member of the RFU in 2012. She was inducted into the IRB Hall of Fame on 17 November 2014.

As of December 2005, Burns was a teacher at Range High School. She stopped teaching in 2016.

In July 2019, she was made an Honorary Doctor of Science (HonDSc) by Edge Hill University.

The annual Women's County Championship and the tournament winners' Cup is named in honour of Burns.
