= Julie Gray =

Julie Gray may refer to:

- Julie Gray (rugby union), American rugby union player
- Julie E. Gray, British biologist

== See also ==
- Julia Mageʼau Gray (born 1973), dancer, choreographer and tattoo artist from Papua New Guinea
