= Shona Ballinger =

NZ international rugby union player

- Born: 14 June 1970 (age 56) Palmerston North, New Zealand
- Height: 1.75 m (5 ft 9 in)

Rugby union career
- Position: Lock
Provincial / State sides
Years	Team	Apps	(Points)
- Wellington
International career
Years	Team	Apps	(Points)
1990–1991	New Zealand	3	(0)

Shona Ballinger (born 14 June 1970) is a former rugby union player. She made her debut for the Black Ferns at RugbyFest 1990 against a World XV's team on 1 September at Christchurch. She was named in the 1991 Women's Rugby World Cup squad, but did not get to play in the World Cup officially.
