= Mary Dixey =

American former rugby union player

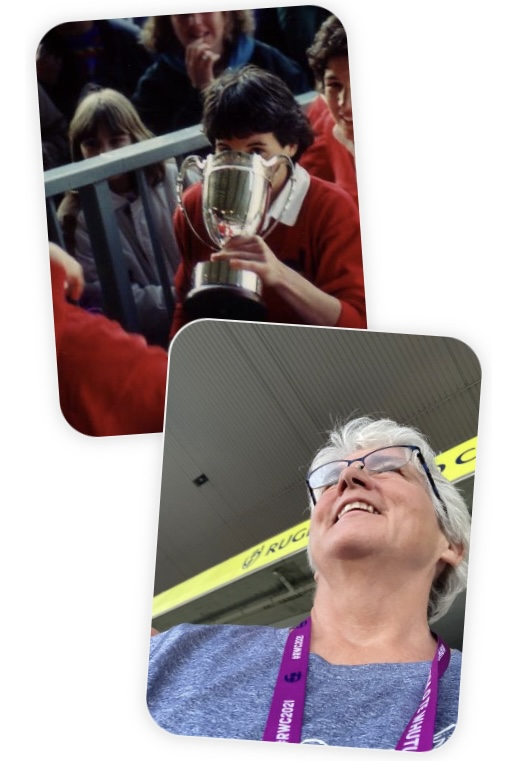
- 1991 WRWC and #RWC2021
- Born: 25 February 1961 (age 65) Petaluma, CA
- Height: 1.65 m (5 ft 5 in)
- Weight: 61.5 kg (136 lb)

Rugby union career
- Position: Fly-half
Senior career
Years	Team	Apps	(Points)
1987–1996	Beantown RFC	100+	(500+)
International career
Years	Team	Apps	(Points)
1991–1994	United States	5	(5)
Coaching career
- Years: Team
- 1993–2001: Radcliffe Rugby
- 2002–2006: Yale WRFC

Mary Dixey (born 25 February 1961) is an American former rugby union player. She was a member of the United States squad that won the inaugural 1991 Women's Rugby World Cup.

== Career ==
Dixey was part of the United States squad that won the inaugural 1991 Women's Rugby World Cup in Wales after defeating England 19–6 in the final. She played at the Flyhalf position for the Eagles side.

Her Eagles appearances include matches against The Netherlands, Wales (co-captain), Canada, Japan, and Ireland.

Dixey scored a try in the Eagles quarter-final match against Ireland in the 1994 Women's Rugby World Cup in Edinburgh, Scotland.

She played club rugby for Beantown RFC and received Club Nationals MVP selection twice. She also played 15s and 7s with Hartford Wild Rose and founded Hello My Name is Mary 7s who played exclusively at the Cape Cod 7s Tournament.

== Coaching ==
Dixey was part of the coaching staff of Radcliffe Rugby at Harvard University from 1993 to 2001, including the 1998 National Championship campaign, and Yale WRFC from 2002 to 2006.

In governance service, Dixey sat on the USA Rugby BOD as a director, the Management Committee as an International Athlete Vice President with oversight of national teams, and she chaired the Eligibility Committee.

== U.S. Rugby Hall of Fame inductee ==
In 2017, she was inducted into the U.S. Rugby Hall of Fame as a member of the 1991 Rugby World Cup team.
