= Morgan Whitehead =

US international rugby union player

Rugby union career
- Position: Flanker
International career
Years	Team	Apps	(Points)
1991	United States		

Morgan Whitehead is a former American rugby union player. She was a member of the United States squad that won the inaugural 1991 Women's Rugby World Cup in Wales. She played in the final against England, Eagles coach Kevin O'Brien opted for a more mobile back-row of Claire Godwin, Whitehead and Kathy Flores.

Whitehead and the 1991 World Cup squad were inducted into the United States Rugby Hall of Fame in 2017.
