= Amanda Ford =

Amanda Ford may refer to:

- Amanda Ford (rugby union) (born 1970), New Zealand rugby union player
- Mandy Ford (born 1961), British Anglican priest
