= Val Blackett =

England women's rugby union player

- Full name: Valerie Naomi Blackett
- Born: December 1967 (age 58) Bath, Somerset, England

Rugby union career
- Position(s): Wing; Fly-half
Amateur team(s)
Years	Team	Apps	(Points)
–	Bath Ladies		
–	Clifton Ladies		
–	Cheltenham Ladies		
International career
Years	Team	Apps	(Points)
1992–1995	England	8	
Medal record
Representing England
Women's rugby union
Rugby World Cup
Gold medal – first place	1994 Scotland	Team competition
Silver medal – second place	1991 Wales	Team competition

Valerie Naomi Blackett (born December 1967) is an English former rugby union player who represented the England women’s national team during the early 1990s. A back who played primarily on the wing before later moving to fly-half, she was a member of the England squad that won the 1994 Women's Rugby World Cup.

== Early life and family ==
Blackett was born in Bath, Somerset, into a family with strong links to rugby. She was the daughter of Erwin Berkly Moefield Blackett (1932–1988), originally from Barbados, and Miriam Naomi Blackett (née Babb) (1935–1984), who married in Bath in 1963.

She had two brothers, known as Pete and Andy, both of whom played rugby locally. Pete Blackett played as a wing for Bath Rugby before later moving to Keynsham, while Andy Blackett was a prop with Old Culverhaysians. Contemporary reports noted that she followed her brothers into rugby.

Before focusing on rugby, she was a talented sprinter with City of Bath, recording a best time of approximately 12 seconds for the 100 metres.

== Rugby career ==
=== Early career ===
Blackett began playing women's rugby union in the late 1980s, initially with Bath Ladies before moving to Clifton Ladies, one of the leading clubs in the women’s game at the time. Her pace and attacking ability quickly brought her into representative rugby, including selection for South West and divisional sides. In representative matches she was noted for her ability to break through defences, being described as making “scorching runs”.

=== International career ===
By the early 1990s Blackett had progressed to the England squad, earning international caps and establishing herself as a dangerous attacking back. She won at least eight caps for England and remained involved with the national side until 1995.

She was part of the England squad at the 1994 Women's Rugby World Cup in Scotland, where England defeated the United States 38–23 in the final to become world champions. Although not initially first-choice, she featured during the tournament after beginning on the bench.

During this period she also appeared in representative fixtures against Scottish and regional opposition, scoring tries at that level and reinforcing her reputation as a fast and effective attacking player.

=== Later club career ===
Following her international career, Blackett continued to play at a high level in club rugby. In 1996 she was still involved in representative rugby while playing for Clifton, including selection for South teams in inter-regional fixtures.

In 1997 she joined Cheltenham Ladies in National Premier Division Two, where she made an immediate impact by scoring the winning try on her debut against Worcester. During this period she underwent a significant positional change, moving from her established role on the wing to outside half, taking on greater responsibility in organising play.

She continued to contribute at club level into the late 1990s, including playing a key role in Cheltenham’s victory in the RFUW South West Sevens tournament in 1999, where she both created and scored tries.

Later accounts indicate that she returned to play in Bristol and continued her career well beyond the typical span for amateur-era players. She remained active into her late 40s, retiring around 2015, and has since continued to take part in occasional rugby sevens matches.
