= Kimi Tiriamai =

New Zealand rugby union player

- Born: 5 December 1964 (age 61) Auckland, New Zealand
- Height: 1.78 m (5 ft 10 in)

Rugby union career
- Position: Lock
Provincial / State sides
Years	Team	Apps	(Points)
- Auckland
International career
Years	Team	Apps	(Points)
1989–1991	New Zealand	6	(0)

Kimiatu Tiriamai (born 5 December 1964) is a former New Zealand rugby union player. She played at Lock for the Black Ferns and Auckland. She also played club rugby for Ponsonby. She debuted for the Black Ferns against the California Grizzlies at Christchurch on 22 July 1989.

Tiriamai was a member of the 1991 Women's Rugby World Cup squad. She featured in their pool games against Canada and Wales.
