= Donna Ewe =

New Zealand rugby union player

- Born: 14 October 1964 (age 62) Auckland, New Zealand
- Height: 1.73 m (5 ft 8 in)

Rugby union career
- Position: Prop
Provincial / State sides
Years	Team	Apps	(Points)
- Auckland
International career
Years	Team	Apps	(Points)
1990–1991	New Zealand	10	(0)

Donna Culleton (née Ewe, born 14 October 1964) is a former New Zealand rugby union player. She played Prop for the Black Ferns at RugbyFest 1990 and at the inaugural 1991 Women's Rugby World Cup.
