= Tracy Lemon =

- Born: January 1, 1970 Bay of Islands, New Zealand
- Died: June 20, 2012 (aged 42)
- Height: 1.63 m (5 ft 4 in)

Rugby union career
Provincial / State sides
Years	Team	Apps	(Points)
- Auckland
International career
Years	Team	Apps	(Points)
1990–1995	New Zealand	8	(0)

Tracy Lemon (1 January 1970 – 20 June 2012) was a New Zealand rugby union player. She made her Black Ferns debut in 1990 against a Russia XV's team. She competed at the 1991 Women's Rugby World Cup in Wales.

== Career ==
In 2000, Lemon suffered a horrific hamstring injury where she ripped it from the bone; she was playing in a Super 12 curtain-raiser match. Lemon has also represented New Zealand in triathlon and outrigger canoe. She is accredited with introducing Valerie Adams to shot put as her P.E teacher at Southern Cross Campus.

== Death ==
Lemon died in June 2012 at the age of 42.
