= Barb Fugate =

American rugby union player, and coach

Rugby union career
- Position: Scrum half
International career
Years	Team	Apps	(Points)
1991	United States	-	(-)

Barb Fugate is an American rugby union player and coach. She coached the US national development team. She was named to the US Rugby hall of fame.

She played at the first Women's Rugby World Cup in 1991. The United States defeated England 19–6 in the final to claim the 1991 World Cup.

== Life ==
She coached the Minnesota Valkyries Rugby Football Club.
