= Andrea Morrell =

US international rugby union player

Rugby union career
- Position: Lock
International career
Years	Team	Apps	(Points)
1991	United States		

Andrea Morrell is a former American rugby union player. She was a member of the United States team that won the inaugural 1991 Women's Rugby World Cup in Wales. She was inducted into the United States Rugby Hall of Fame along with the 1991 World Cup squad in 2017.
