= Carol Hayes =

- Born: 31 December 1970 (age 55) Invercargill, New Zealand
- Height: 1.72 m (5 ft 8 in)
- Weight: 107 kg (236 lb)

Rugby union career
- Position: Prop
Provincial / State sides
Years	Team	Apps	(Points)
- Southland
International career
Years	Team	Apps	(Points)
1989–1993	New Zealand	6	(0)

Carol Hayes (born 31 December 1970) is a former New Zealand rugby union player. She competed for New Zealand at the inaugural 1991 Women's Rugby World Cup in Wales.

== Rugby career ==
Hayes was in the inaugural New Zealand women's XV's squad that played against the California Grizzlies at Christchurch in 1989.

Hayes was spotted by then coach, Laurie O'Reilly, when she played for Southland against Canterbury in a curtain raiser match to Argentina and Canterbury men's clash at Lancaster Park in 1989. She was selected for the Black Ferns for the 1991 Women's Rugby World Cup, however, she did not play in the tournament itself. She featured in their warm up games against local clubs.

Hayes appeared for the Black Ferns in their 36–0 victory against an Auckland XV's team in 1992. She then made her last appearance against a President's XV at Wellington in 1993.
