= Elsie Paitai =

- Born: 20 February 1963 (age 63) Auckland, New Zealand
- Height: 1.65 m (5 ft 5 in)

Rugby union career
Provincial / State sides
Years	Team	Apps	(Points)
- Auckland
International career
Years	Team	Apps	(Points)
1990–1991	New Zealand	5	(8)

Elsie Paitai-Hovell (born 20 February 1963) is a former rugby union player. She made her debut for the Black Ferns on 30 August 1990 against the United States at Christchurch. She was selected for the 1991 Women's Rugby World Cup squad, but didn't feature in the World Cup itself.

Paitai-Hovell played club rugby for Ponsonby.
