= Val Sullivan =

- Born: 17 August 1963 (age 63)
- Height: 1.65 m (5 ft 5 in)

Rugby union career
- Position: Hooker
International career
Years	Team	Apps	(Points)
- United States

Val Sullivan (born 17 August 1963) is a former American rugby union player. She was a member of the United States squad that won the inaugural 1991 Women's Rugby World Cup in Wales.

Sullivan attended Slippery Rock University of Pennsylvania where she played collegiate rugby before moving to Florida State to study for a master’s degree in exercise physiology. She was inducted into the United States Rugby Hall of Fame along with the 1991 World Cup team in 2017.
