= Natasha Wong =

- Born: November 13, 1967 (age 59) Wellington, New Zealand
- Height: 1.68 m (5 ft 6 in)

Rugby union career
Provincial / State sides
Years	Team	Apps	(Points)
1988–1998	Canterbury	75	(0)
International career
Years	Team	Apps	(Points)
1989–1991	New Zealand	3	(0)

Natasha Wong (born 13 November 1967) is a former New Zealand rugby union player. She represented New Zealand at the inaugural 1991 Women's Rugby World Cup.

== Rugby career ==
=== Playing career ===
In 1988, She played for the Crusadettes team which was coached by Laurie O'Reilly. They toured Europe and won 17 out of their 21 matches.

Wong competed for New Zealand at the inaugural 1991 Women's Rugby World Cup in Wales. She represented Canterbury provincially.

=== Administrative career ===
She was the first woman appointed as a member of the Canterbury Rugby Football Union board. Since 2011, she has been the team manager for the Canterbury Women's team in the Farah Palmer Cup.
