= Tracy Moens =

US international rugby union player

Rugby union career
Senior career
Years	Team	Apps	(Points)
1980–2003	New Orleans Halfmoons RFC		(-)
1986–1996	TRU Select Side		(-)
1987–1996	Western RFU Select Side		(-)
1992–1996	Atlantis 7s		(-)
International career
Years	Team	Apps	(Points)
1987	United States		
National sevens team
Years	Team		Comps
1997	United States		
Coaching career
- Years: Team
- 2002–2006: United States (Strength & Conditioning Coach)
- 1999, 2001: Atlantis 7s
- 1997–1999: Western RFC Select Side 7s

Tracy Moens (née Henderson) is a former American rugby union player. She was a part of the United States squad that won the inaugural 1991 Women's Rugby World Cup in Wales.

Moens made her Eagles debut on November 14, 1987 against Canada at Victoria, British Columbia. It was the first-ever women's test match that was played outside of Europe. She also featured for the USA women's 7s in 1997. Between 2002 and 2006 she was the Strength and Conditioning Coach for the Eagles.

Henderson and the 1991 World Cup squad were inducted into the United States Rugby Hall of Fame in 2017.
