= Sandy Meredith =

US international rugby union player

- Born: 15 July 1962 (age 64)

Rugby union career
- Position: Wing
International career
Years	Team	Apps	(Points)
- United States

Sandy Meredith (born 15 July 1962) is a former American rugby union player. She was a member of the United States squad that won the inaugural 1991 Women's Rugby World Cup in Wales.

In 2017 Meredith and the 1991 World Cup squad were inducted into the United States Rugby Hall of Fame.
