= Nina Sio =

- Born: October 21, 1963 (age 63) Auckland, New Zealand
- Height: 1.8 m (5 ft 11 in)

Rugby union career
- Position(s): Lock, Loose forward
Provincial / State sides
Years	Team	Apps	(Points)
- Auckland
1993–1995	Waikato		
International career
Years	Team	Apps	(Points)
1989–1994	New Zealand	11	(4)

Nina Sio (born 21 October 1963) is a former New Zealand rugby union player. She made her debut for the Black Ferns on 22 July 1989 against the California Grizzlies at Christchurch. She was also in the 1991 Women's Rugby World Cup squad.
