= Amanda Ford (rugby union) =

New Zealand rugby union player

- Born: 25 July 1970 (age 56) Kaikōura, New Zealand
- Height: 1.63 m (5 ft 4 in)

Rugby union career
Provincial / State sides
| Years | Team | Apps | (Points) |
- Canterbury
International career
| Years | Team | Apps | (Points) |
| 1989–1991 | New Zealand | 7 | (4) |

Amanda Tomlinson (née Ford; born 25 July 1970) is a former New Zealand rugby union player.

== Biography ==
=== Rugby career ===
Ford was named as a reserve, but did not feature, in the Black Ferns match against the Californian Grizzlies at Lancaster Park in Christchurch; on 22 July 1989.

At RugbyFest 1990, she played for the University of Canterbury, the New Zealand Teachers College selection and New Zealand. She was selected for the 1991 Women's Rugby World Cup squad.

=== Horse racing career ===
Ford currently competes in Harness racing, a form of horse racing. In 2021, she had her first win as a trainer.
