= Cathy Seabaugh =

US international rugby union player

Cathy Seabaugh is a former American rugby union player. She was a member of the United States squad that won the inaugural 1991 Women's Rugby World Cup in Wales. In 2017 Seabaugh and the 1991 World Cup squad were inducted into the United States Rugby Hall of Fame.

Seabaugh published her first novel Sarah's Gate in 2018.
