= Julie Thompson =

US international rugby union player

- Born: 14 April 1958 (age 68)
- Height: 1.65 m (5 ft 5 in)
- Weight: 62 kg (137 lb)

Rugby union career
- Position: Hooker
International career
Years	Team	Apps	(Points)
- United States

Julie Thompson (born 14 April 1958) is a former American rugby union player. She represented the United States when they won the inaugural 1991 Women's Rugby World Cup in Wales. Thompson and the 1991 World Cup squad were inducted into the United States Rugby Hall of Fame in 2017.
