= Kate Eaves =

- Born: 6 May 1968 (age 58)
- Height: 1.78 m (5 ft 10 in)

Rugby union career
- Position: Lock
Senior career
Years	Team	Apps	(Points)
1988–?	Wasps Ladies		(0)
International career
Years	Team	Apps	(Points)
1988–?	Wales	17	

Kate Eaves (born 6 May 1968) is a former Welsh rugby union player. She represented Wales at the 1991 and 1994 Rugby World Cup's.

== Biography ==
Eaves began playing for the Wasps Ladies in 1988 and captained them between 1988 and 1991. In 1993 she scored two tries in a test match against Scotland and helped her side win 23–0. At the 1994 World Cup, Eaves scored a brace of tries against Kazakhstan in the pool stages to help her side make a comeback from an 8–6 half-time deficit to win 29–8.
