= Cassie Law =

American women's rugby union player

Rugby union career
- Position: Flanker
Senior career
Years	Team	Apps	(Points)
1988–1995	Bay Area SheHawks		(-)
	Pacific Coast Grizzlies		(-)
International career
Years	Team	Apps	(Points)
1990–1994	United States		

Cassandra (Cassie) Law is a former American women's rugby union player. She was a member of the United States championship team that won the inaugural 1991 Women's Rugby World Cup in Cardiff, Wales.

== Biography ==
Law began her rugby career in 1985 while studying at the University of Oregon. After graduating in 1988, she moved to San Francisco, California to begin her federal career with the US Department of Veterans Affairs. Her rugby career continued in California with the Bay Area SheHawks (BASH) where she competed from 1988 to 1995 winning three National Titles. During these years, she represented the Pacific Coast Grizzlies territorial team and was selected to join the USA Eagles Women's National Rugby Team competing from 1990 to 1994.

Law's international rugby career as a United States Eagle began at RugbyFest 1990 in New Zealand. She was in the inaugural 1991 Rugby World Cup and also featured in the 1994 Rugby World Cup in Edinburgh, Scotland where the Eagles fell to England taking second place.

In March 2017, Law and the 1991 U.S. Women's World Cup Championship team were inducted into the United States Rugby Hall of Fame in San Diego, California.

Law is currently a Senior Executive for the US Department of Veterans Affairs (VA), serving as the Deputy Chief of Staff where she advises the Secretary, Deputy Secretary and Chief of Staff on internal operations of the VA, the federal government's second-largest Cabinet department with a budget of over $269 billion and more than 470,000 employees serving in health care settings, benefits delivery and national cemeteries.
