= Miriama Baker =

- Born: 1 September 1962 (age 64) Te Awamutu, New Zealand
- Height: 1.68 m (5 ft 6 in)

Rugby union career
- Position: Fly-half
Provincial / State sides
Years	Team	Apps	(Points)
	Auckland		(0)
International career
Years	Team	Apps	(Points)
1989–1991	New Zealand	2	(0)

Miriama Baker (born 1 September 1962) is a former New Zealand rugby union player.

== Rugby career ==
Baker played in the first official match played by a New Zealand women's rugby team against the California Grizzlies in 1989; New Zealand won13–7.

Baker was selected for the 1991 World Cup squad and was the oldest in the team. Although she was in the team, she didn't get to play in the actual tournament. In 1992, she moved to Australia, but soon returned to Auckland in 1995.
