= Tam Breckenridge =

- Born: 1 October 1958 (age 68)
- Height: 1.8 m (5 ft 11 in)
- Weight: 74 kg (163 lb)

Rugby union career
- Position: Lock
International career
Years	Team	Apps	(Points)
- United States
Coaching career
- Years: Team
- United States
- –: Southern California All-Star
- –: UCLA Women’s Rugby

Tam Breckenridge (born 1 October 1958) is an American female former rugby union player. She represented the United States at the inaugural 1991 Women's Rugby World Cup held in Wales. They were crowned champions after defeating England 19–6 in the final. Breckenridge and her 1991 World Cup teammates were inducted into the United States Rugby Hall of Fame in 2017.
