= Joan Morrissey (rugby union) =

US international rugby union player

Rugby union career
- Position: Centre
Senior career
Years	Team	Apps	(Points)
1985	Wiverns	7	(4)
- Beantown RFC
International career
Years	Team	Apps	(Points)
- United States

Joan Morrissey is a former American rugby union player. She was a member of the United States squad that won the inaugural 1991 Women's Rugby World Cup in Wales.

Morrissey was part of the Wiverns team that toured England and France in 1985. She made seven appearances for the Wiverns and scored a try in their tour. In 2017 Morrissey and the 1991 World Cup squad were inducted into the United States Rugby Hall of Fame.
