= Jennifer Hertz =

American Rugby Union player

- Born: 8 November 1964 (age 62)
- Height: 1.67 m (5 ft 6 in)
- Weight: 77 kg (170 lb)

Rugby union career
- Position: Prop
International career
| Years | Team | Apps | (Points) |
- United States

Jennifer Hertz (born 8 November 1964) is a former American rugby union player. She was a member of the United States squad that won the inaugural 1991 Women's Rugby World Cup in Wales after defeating England 19–6 in the Final.

In 2017, Hertz and the 1991 World Cup squad were inducted into the United States Rugby Hall of Fame.
