= Sue Brooks (rugby union) =

Rugby union career
International career
Years	Team	Apps	(Points)
1994	United States		

Sue Brooks is an American former rugby union player. She represented the United States at the 1994 Rugby World Cup in Scotland.
