= Elise Huffer =

US international rugby union player

Rugby union career
- Position: Center
International career
Years	Team	Apps	(Points)
1991, 1994	United States		

Elise Huffer is an Academic and former American rugby union player. She was a member of the United States squad that won the inaugural 1991 Women's Rugby World Cup in Wales. She also featured at the 1994 Women's Rugby World Cup in Scotland.

Huffer was born to an American mother and a French father. She has studied in the United States and France. She is a graduate of UCLA. Huffer has worked for 11 years in the Pacific Studies Program as a senior lecturer and as an associate professor at the University of the South Pacific. She also served as human development adviser for the then South Pacific Commission.

Huffer and the 1991 World Cup squad were inducted into the United States Rugby Hall of Fame in 2017.
