= Barb Bond =

American former rugby union player

- Born: August 9, 1962 (age 64)
- Height: 173 cm (5 ft 8 in)
- Weight: 70 kg (154 lb)

Rugby union career
- Position: Number 8
International career
Years	Team	Apps	(Points)
1991–1998	United States	-	(-)

Barbara Bond (born August 9, 1962) is an American former rugby union player. She captained the United States at the first Women's Rugby World Cup in 1991. They defeated England 19-6 in the final to claim the 1991 World Cup. She also participated at the 1994, and 1998 Women's Rugby World Cup.

== Life ==
She graduated from Reed College.
