= Lisa Weix =

American rugby union player

Lisa Weix is an American former rugby union player. She represented runners-up, the United States, at the 1994 Women's Rugby World Cup in Scotland.

Weix played for the Richmond Women's team in England.
