= Gwalia Lightning =

Welsh women's rugby union team

- Founded: 2023; 3 years ago
- Ground: Cardiff Arms Park
- Coach: Catrina Nicholas-McLaughlin
- Captain: Bryonie King
- League: Celtic Challenge
- 2025–26: 3rd

Gwalia Lightning is a Welsh women's rugby union team based in Cardiff. Founded in 2023, the team competes in the Celtic Challenge, the international competition between Scottish, Welsh and Irish regional teams.

== History ==
The Welsh Rugby Union (WRU) announced the creation of two teams that would compete in the Celtic Challenge in December 2023, the teams were Gwalia Lightning and Brython Thunder. They replaced the Wales Development XV team that competed in the inaugural Celtic Challenge season.

Former Welsh international Catrina Nicholas-McLaughlin was appointed head coach for the 2023–24 season.

The first match in the history of the team took place on 30 December 2023, against Brython Thunder. The match was won by Gwalia Lightning. The team won three of their seven matches and finished fourth in the table. They finished the 2024–25 in third place, behind the Irish teams of The Clovers (2nd) and The Wolfhounds (1st).

In April 2025 WRU announced their plans to revamp their two Celtic Challenge teams, inviting regions and universities to bid for new teams that would replace both Brython Thunder and Gwalia Lightning. The plan was later postponed "due to the ongoing transformation in the men's game" meaning both teams would compete again in the 2025–26 season.
