= Agriculture, Ecosystems & Environment =

- Discipline: Agroecosystems, ecology, environmental science
- Language: English
- Edited by: Tom Veldkamp and Yong Li

Publication details
- Former names: Agriculture and Environment, Agro-Ecosystems
- History: 1974-present
- Publisher: Elsevier
- Frequency: 18/year
- Impact factor: 4.241 (2019)

Standard abbreviations
- ISO 4: Agric. Ecosyst. Environ.

Indexing
- CODEN: AEENDO
- ISSN: 0167-8809
- LCCN: 83643491
- OCLC no.: 9506512
- Agriculture and Environment
- ISSN: 0304-1131
- Agro-Ecosystems
- ISSN: 0304-3746

Links
- Journal homepage; Online access; Online archives, Agriculture and Environment; Online archives, Agro-Ecosystems

Agriculture, Ecosystems & Environment is an international peer-reviewed scientific journal published eighteen times per year by Elsevier. It covers research on the interrelationships between the natural environments and agroecosystems, and their effects on each other. The editors-in-chief are Tom Veldkamp and Yong Li.

== History ==
The journal in its current form originated in 1983 from a merger between Agriculture and Environment and Agro-Ecosystems, both of which were established in 1974.

== Abstracting and indexing ==
This journal is abstracted and indexed in:

- AGRICOLA
- BIOSIS
- Elsevier BIOBASE
- Current Contents/Agriculture, Biology & Environmental Sciences
- Environmental Abstracts/Environmental Sciences and Pollution Management
- GEOBASE
- Science Citation Index
- Scopus
- EMBiology

According to the Journal Citation Reports, the journal has a 2019 impact factor of 4.241.
