= Annie Flavin =

US international rugby union player

- Born: 20 July 1961 (age 65)

Rugby union career
- Position: Prop
Senior career
Years	Team	Apps	(Points)
	Beantown RFC		(-)
International career
Years	Team	Apps	(Points)
1987–1994?	United States		

Annie Flavin (born 20 July 1961) is a former American rugby union player. She was a part of the United States championship team that won the inaugural 1991 Women's Rugby World Cup after defeating England in the final. She was also selected for the 1994 Women's Rugby World Cup squad that competed in Scotland.

Flavin featured in the Eagles first international test match against Canada in Victoria, British Columbia on 14 November 1987. In 2017 she was inducted into the U.S. Rugby Hall of Fame alongside the 1991 Rugby World Cup team.
