= Julie Drustrup =

Rugby union career
- Position(s): Center, Fullback
Senior career
Years	Team	Apps	(Points)
	Maryland Stingers		(0)
International career
Years	Team	Apps	(Points)
1992–?	United States		

Julie Drustrup is an American former rugby union player. She represented the United States at the 1994 Rugby World Cup in Scotland.
