= Jan Rutkowski =

- Born: 27 June 1955 (age 71)
- Height: 1.73 m (5 ft 8 in)

Rugby union career
- Position: Lock
Senior career
Years	Team	Apps	(Points)
- Beantown RFC
International career
Years	Team	Apps	(Points)
- United States
Coaching career
- Years: Team
- Beantown RFC

Jan Rutkowski (born 27 June 1955) is a former American rugby union player. She was part of the United States team that won the inaugural 1991 Women's Rugby World Cup. She was also in the 1994 squad that were runners-up to England.

Rutkowski began playing rugby in 1980 for Beantown RFC with whom she has won six National Championships. After her playing career ended, she then coached Beantown RFC for almost ten years.
