= Tara Flanagan =

American rugby union player

- Born: October 18, 1963 (age 63) San Francisco, California, U.S.
- Height: 6 ft 0 in (1.83 m)
- Weight: 174 lb (79 kg)

Rugby union career
- Position: Lock
International career
Years	Team	Apps	(Points)
1991	United States		

Tara Flanagan (born October 18, 1963, in San Francisco) is a Judge of the Superior Court of the State of California in the County of Alameda, and former rugby union player. She was a member of the victorious United States 1991 Women's Rugby World Cup squad and also played in the following World Cup in 1994.

== Life ==
Flanagan earned a Bachelor of Science degree from California State University, Northridge. She lived in England while in pursuit of her rugby dreams. She enrolled at the Southwestern Law School after the 1994 World Cup and received her Juris Doctor degree in 1998.
