= Kris Kany =

US international rugby union player

Rugby union career
- Position: Flanker
International career
Years	Team	Apps	(Points)
1991, 1994	United States		

Kris Kany is a former American rugby union player. She was a member of the United States squad that won the inaugural 1991 Women's Rugby World Cup in Wales. She also featured at the 1994 Rugby World Cup in Scotland.

Kany and the 1991 World Cup squad were inducted into the United States Rugby Hall of Fame in 2017.
