= Betsy Hill =

American rugby union player

Betsy Hill is an American former rugby union player. She represented the United States at the 1994 Rugby World Cup in Scotland.
