= Mary O'Sullivan =

Mary O'Sullivan may refer to:

- Mary Blanche O'Sullivan (1860–?), Canadian teacher, writer, and editor
- Mary Josephine Donovan O'Sullivan (1887–1966), Irish professor of history
- Mary Kenney O'Sullivan (1864–1943), American organizer in the early U.S. labor movement
- Mary O'Sullivan, Irish camogie player from 1958 and 1959 All-Ireland Senior Camogie Championship
- Mary Rhys-Jones (née O'Sullivan) (born 1965), British charity worker and secretary, mother of Sophie, Countess of Wessex
