= Mary Gail Sullivan =

- Born: January 6, 1962 (age 64)
- Height: 1.7 m (5 ft 7 in)
- Weight: 66 kg (146 lb)

Rugby union career
- Position: Fullback
International career
Years	Team	Apps	(Points)
1987–?	United States	-	(-)

Mary Gail Sullivan (born 6 January 1962) is a former American rugby union player. She captained the United States at the inaugural 1991 Women's Rugby World Cup held in Wales.

== Biography ==
Sullivan made her Eagles debut on November 14, 1987 against Canada at Victoria, British Columbia. It was the first women's test match to be played outside of Europe.

Sullivan's rugby career spanned over twenty years. She graduated from the Muscular Therapy Institute in Cambridge, Massachusetts in 1993 and taught there for fifteen years. She also served as department chair of the Massage Technique department and went into private practice in 1992.

In 2017 Sullivan and the 1991 World Cup squad were inducted into the United States Rugby Hall of Fame.
