= Kevin O'Brien (rugby union coach) =

Welsh rugby union coach

Rugby union career
Coaching career
- Years: Team
- Beantown RFC
- 1991: United States
- Middlebury College Men’s Rugby
- Harvard University Men’s Rugby
- Burlington Men’s Rugby
- Eastern Women’s Rugby All-Stars
- South Burlington HS Boy’s Rugby (co-coach)

Kevin O'Brien is a Welsh rugby union coach. He coached the United States women's national rugby union team at the inaugural 1991 Women's Rugby World Cup. He is the only coach to have won a Rugby World Cup for the United States so far.

O'Brien attended Saint Mary's College in London, England from 1966 to 1970. He was initially contacted by Beantown Women's Rugby in Boston to be their head coach. He has coached for over 45 years and at all levels of rugby.

In 2021 O'Brien was inducted into the US Rugby Hall of Fame.
