= Soviet Union women's national rugby union team =

First colours	Second colours

First international
- New Zealand 8–0 Soviet Union (Lincoln University, Lincoln; 28 August 1990)

Biggest defeat
- United States 46–0 Soviet Union (Memorial Ground, Cardiff; 10 April 1991)

World Cup
- Appearances: 1

The Soviet Union women's national rugby union team were the women's national rugby union team of the Soviet Union. They played six matches between 1990 and 1991, losing them all. The team was severely underfunded, surviving the 1991 Women's Rugby World Cup by bartering and selling items of kit and other artefacts such as vodka. They ceased playing after 1991, because of the collapse of the Soviet Union.

== History ==
The Soviet Union played their first match at RugbyFest 1990 against the New Zealand women's national rugby union team and lost 8–0. They also lost their other two matches in the tournament against the Netherlands and the United States. They were invited to participate in the 1991 Women's Rugby World Cup in Wales. This was the first time most of the players had got Soviet Union passports and traveled outside the Soviet Union. The majority of the team was made up from the Moscow-based Victoria rugby club. The team were delayed for two days and half of their luggage went missing at Moscow Airport. When the team arrived, they smuggled five crates of Russian vodka and caviar through customs at Heathrow Airport.

When they arrived in Wales, they resorted to selling or bartering their vodka, caviar and sportswear in order to pay for their living expenses as they were not allowed to take any money out of the Soviet Union. Officers from HM Customs and Excise visited the team when they heard about the illicit vodka sales but left without issuing any enforcement due to the language barrier. The story was reported in national newspapers in the United Kingdom, which led to several donations being given to cover their expenses, including meals from a local pie merchant, £1,200 from an anonymous donor and £100 from the mother of the Welsh team's hooker. The Soviet Union lost all their matches during the tournament against the Netherlands, the United States and Canada; playing without scrum caps or gumshields.

The tournament organisers were left with a £30,000 debt owed to the Rugby Football Union after it, which was mainly attributed to the Soviet team as they were unable to pay their expenses. This was the last time the Soviet team played as following the dissolution of the Soviet Union; their place in the 1994 Women's Rugby World Cup was taken by the successor teams of Russia and Kazakhstan.

== Results summary ==
(Full internationals only, updated to 11 April 1991)

Soviet Union Internationals From 1990
Opponent	First Match	Played	Won	Drawn	Lost	For	Against	Win %
Canada	1991	1	0	0	1	0	38	0.00%
Netherlands	1990	2	0	0	2	4	40	0.00%
New Zealand	1990	1	0	0	1	0	8	0.00%
United States	1990	2	0	0	2	0	78	0.00%
Summary	1990	6	0	0	6	4	164	0.00%

== Results ==
=== Full internationals ===
Won	Lost	Draw

Test	Date	Opponent	PF	PA	Venue	Event	Ref
1	28 August 1990	New Zealand	0	8	Lincoln University, Lincoln	RugbyFest 1990	
2	30 August 1990	Netherlands	4	12	Christchurch	RugbyFest 1990	
3	31 August 1990	United States	0	32	Lancaster Park, Christchurch	RugbyFest 1990	
4	8 April 1991	Netherlands	0	28	The Dairy Field, Llanharan	1991 World Cup	
5	10 April 1991	United States	0	46	Memorial Ground, Cardiff	1991 World Cup	
6	11 April 1991	Canada	0	38	Cardiff Arms Park, Cardiff	1991 World Cup	

== See also ==
- Kyrgyzstan women's national rugby union team
- Rugby union in the Soviet Union
- Soviet Union national rugby union team
- Uzbekistan women's national rugby union team
