= Julie Gray (rugby union) =

American rugby union player

Julie Gray is an American former rugby union player. She represented the United States at the 1994 Rugby World Cup in Scotland. The Eagles were runners-up to England after losing 23–38 in the final.
