= 2033 Women's Rugby World Cup =

Twelfth edition of the Rugby World Cup for women

- Bid logo. 31 refers to Men's 2031 and 33 to Women's 2033 RWC.

Tournament details
- Host nation: United States
- Dates: –
- No. of nations: 16

The 2033 Women's Rugby World Cup is scheduled to be the twelfth edition of the women's Rugby World Cup. The tournament will be held in the United States. This will be the second Women's Rugby World Cup to be held in the Americas. The previous one was held in Canada in 2006 with New Zealand emerging as the champions.

== Host nation selection ==
The United States was the only bidder for the tournament. The US was announced as the host nation of the 2031 Men's Rugby World Cup and 2033 Women's Rugby World Cup on May 12, 2022. It is the second Women's Rugby World Cup to be held in North America, following Canada's hosting of the 2006 tournament.

2033 Rugby World Cup bidding results
Nation	Votes
United States	Acclamation

== Development & preparations ==
=== Candidate cities ===
A total of 27 cities have been shortlisted for the 2033 Women's Rugby World Cup. Shortlisted cities include Atlanta, Baltimore, Birmingham, Boston, Charlotte, Chicago, Cincinnati, Denver, Houston, Kansas City, Los Angeles, Miami, Minneapolis, Nashville, New Orleans, New York/New Jersey, Orlando, Philadelphia, Pittsburgh, Phoenix, Salt Lake City, San Diego, San Francisco Bay Area, Seattle, St. Louis, and Washington, D.C. in the United States as well as Vancouver in Canada. Most of the proposed venues are NFL stadiums, with a number of MLB and MLS stadiums in the running as well.

Shortlisted locations

== Qualifying ==
Tournament hosts, the United States qualify automatically.

Qualified teams
Region	Team	Qualification method	Previous apps	Previous best result	World Rugby Ranking^{1}
North America	United States	Hosts	TBC	Champions (1991)	

Notes

- ^1 – Post warm-up matches

== See also ==
- 2031 Men's Rugby World Cup
