= 2029 Women's Rugby World Cup =

Eleventh edition of the Rugby World Cup for women

Tournament details
- Host nation: Australia
- Dates: –
- No. of nations: 16

The 2029 Women's Rugby World Cup will be the eleventh edition of the Women's Rugby World Cup. The tournament is due to be held in Australia, two years after the men's counterpart, making Australia the first country to host both the men's and women's Rugby World Cup in successive editions. It will be the first Women's Rugby World Cup held in Australia, and the second in the southern hemisphere following the 2022 edition in New Zealand.

The defending champions are England, who beat Canada 33–13 in the 2025 final at Twickenham Stadium.

== Host selection ==
On 13 August 2020, World Rugby announced a joint selection process for the next two men's and women's Rugby World Cups. Australia was named preferred candidate for the 2029 tournament in April 2022. The United States had expressed interest in hosting the 2029 women's tournament but redirected its focus to 2033.

On 12 May 2022, the World Rugby Council unanimously confirmed Australia as host of both the 2027 Men's Rugby World Cup and the 2029 Women's Rugby World Cup at its annual meeting in Dublin. The dual award made Australia the first country in history to host consecutive Rugby World Cups.

== Teams ==
=== Qualifying ===
Sixteen teams will compete in the tournament. World Rugby confirmed the qualification pathway in September 2025 alongside the launch of the WXV Global Series, a new international fixture series running from 2026 to 2028 that will serve as the central pathway to the tournament. Five teams have already qualified: Australia as tournament hosts, and Canada, France, England, and New Zealand as the 2025 Women's Rugby World Cup semi-finalists. Eight further places will be filled through regional competition results in 2027, with two additional berths awarded to the best non-qualified teams via the World Rugby Women's Rankings at the end of the 2027 international window. The final place will be decided at the 2028 WXV Global Challenger Series, which will serve as the Final Qualification Tournament.

Qualified teams
Region	Team	Qualification method	Date of qualification	Previous apps	Previous best result	World Rugby Ranking (Note: Post warm-up matches)
Europe	England	Semifinalists in 2025	14 September 2025	10	Champions (three times)	
Europe	France	Semifinalists in 2025	14 September 2025	10	Third place (seven times)	
North America	Canada	Semifinalists in 2025	13 September 2025	10	Runners-up (2014, 2025)	
Oceania	Australia	Hosts	12 May 2022	8	Third place (2010)	
Oceania	New Zealand	Semifinalists in 2025	13 September 2025	9	Champions (six times)	

== Marketing ==
=== Sponsorship ===
Principal partners	Official partners	Official suppliers & supporters
Asahi Breweries; Emirates; Visa	Isuzu; Liqui Moly	Gilbert; Macron; Ticketmaster; Unilever; Woolworths

== See also ==
- 2027 Men's Rugby World Cup
