= Wales women's national rugby union team =

Women's rugby union in Wales

Wales
- Emblem: Prince of Wales's feathers
- Union: Welsh Rugby Union
- Head coach: Sean Lynn
- Captain: Alex Callender & Kate Williams
- Most caps: Louise Rickard (112)
- Top scorer: Non Evans (489)
- Top try scorer: Non Evans (64)
- Home stadium: Various across Wales
First colours	Second colours

World Rugby ranking
- Current: 12 (as of 22 September 2025)
- Highest: 3 (24 August 2009)
- Lowest: 12 (2025)

First international
- Wales 4–22 England (Pontypool, Wales; 5 April 1987)

Biggest win
- Germany 0–77 Wales (Barcelona, Spain; 17 May 2002)

Biggest defeat
- Wales 0–81 England (Cardiff, Wales; 4 February 2005)

World Cup
- Appearances: 9 (First in 1991)
- Best result: 4th place (1994)

Women's World Rugby Rankings Top 20 rankings as of 6 April 2026
Rank	Change*	Team	Points
1	Steady	England	98.09
2	Steady	Canada	91.53
3	Steady	New Zealand	89.85
4	Steady	France	83.60
5	Steady	Ireland	78.20
6	Steady	Scotland	77.39
7	Steady	Australia	75.46
8	Steady	United States	72.90
9	Steady	Italy	72.37
10	Steady	South Africa	71.62
11	Steady	Japan	69.72
12	Steady	Wales	66.13
13	Steady	Fiji	63.98
14	Steady	Spain	62.42
15	Steady	Samoa	59.72
16	Steady	Hong Kong	57.56
17	Steady	Netherlands	57.42
18	Steady	Russia	55.10
19	Steady	Kazakhstan	53.88
20	▲1	Germany	51.10
*Change from the previous week

The Wales women's national rugby union team first played in 1987. Wales plays in the Women's Rugby World Cup and the Women's Six Nations Championship. Their current head coach, as of January 2025, is Sean Lynn.

== History ==
As far back as the nineteenth century, the Welsh game was a notable for the high levels of female interest. As such, the newly constructed stand at Cardiff Arms Park had to be renovated for "the comfort of the ladies", with another reporter stating that "fully a third" of the spectators at Stradey Park, Llanelli were female. In 1905, an English journalist from the Daily Mail reporting on The Original All Blacks game against Newport RFC at Rodney Parade, reported: "The average woman in Newport, judging from the expert feminine criticisms punctuating Saturday’s play, apparently knows as much of the science of rugby as any man."

While it is still a subject of debate as to when the first female Welsh teams played, women's rugby would gain great prominence during the First World War, as many male players were called into service. One of the most notable matches took place at Cardiff Arms Park on 16 December 1917, when Cardiff Ladies (made up entirely of workers from Hancocks Brewery) beat Newport Ladies 6–0. Maria Eley played full-back for Cardiff and went on to become probably the oldest women's rugby player before she died in Cardiff in 2007 at the age of 106. A photograph of the Cardiff team is believed to be the oldest known image of a women's rugby team and is part of the collection at Cardiff Rugby Museum.

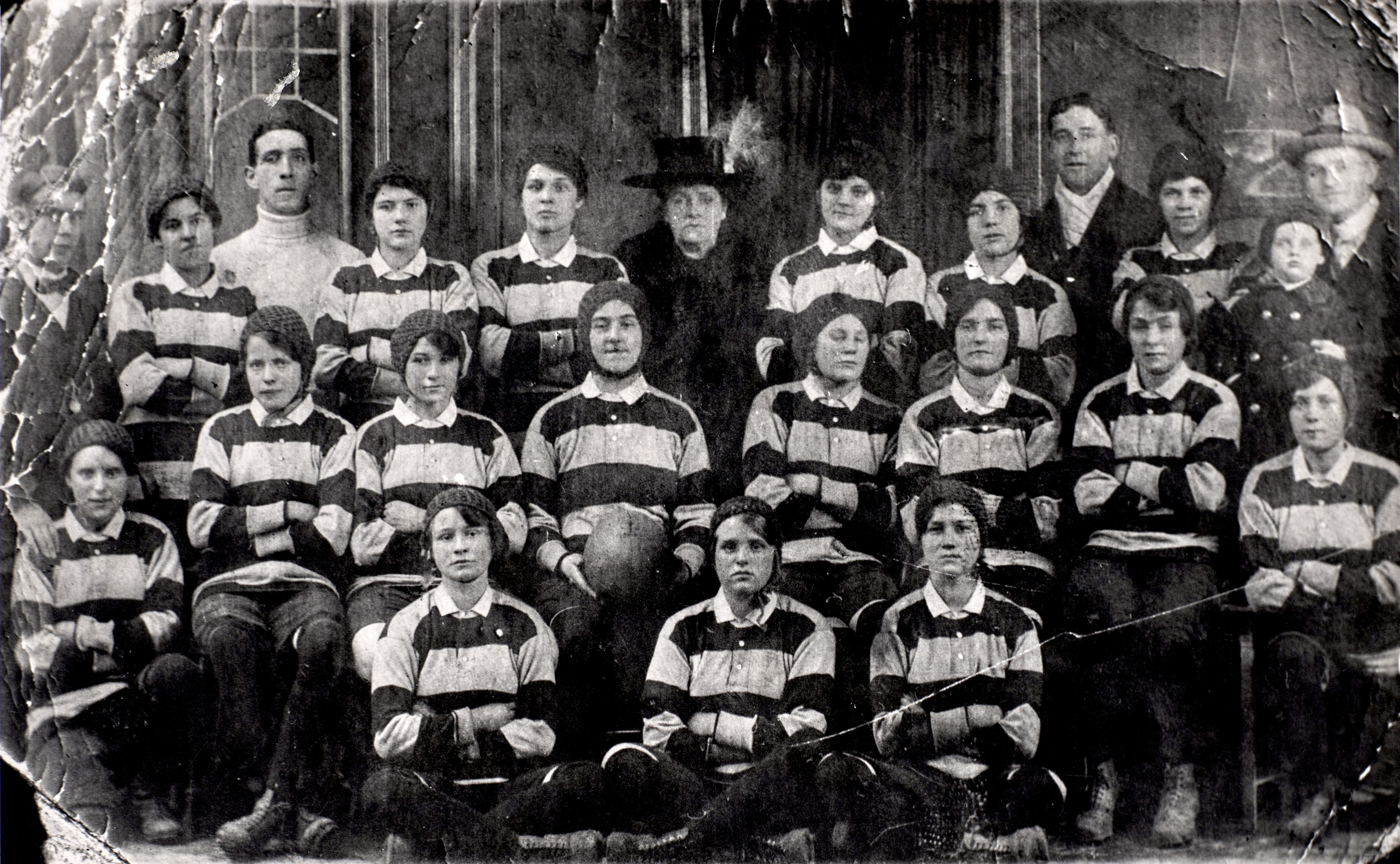
The Cardiff Ladies. Taken on 15 December 1917, it is believed to be the oldest image of a women's rugby team

The first official Wales Women team first played on 5 April 1987 when led by Liza Burgess, they took on an England Women side at Pontypool Park. Prior to 1987, Welsh players were selected to represent Great Britain with the first representative side featuring players from Wales running against France at Richmond Athletic Ground in 1986. Great Britain played as a team on several occasions until 1990, beating Italy in their final match. Wales have played England every year since 1987.

Wales hosted the first Women's Rugby World Cup in Cardiff in 1991 and since then they have participated in a further four of the five tournaments finishing fourth in 1994, their highest ever finish. The IRB adopted the competition in 1998, which was won by the New Zealand Black Ferns.

The Welsh Women's Rugby Union was created in 1994 charged with promoting and governing the development and practice of Women's Rugby in Wales; the other three home unions also took charge of their own administration effectively ending the function of the WRFU in the process. The WWRU also became affiliated to the Welsh Rugby Union at the same time.

The creation of four separate home unions for Women's Rugby in Great Britain also saw the introduction of the Women's Home Nations competition with the first set of internationals taking place in 1995. Wales Women's early years in the tournament saw victories only against Ireland. Wales Women also remain the only touring team from Wales to have won a Test series in South Africa, beating the Bokkies by two Test to nil back in 1994.

From 2004 to 2006 a policy of selecting only players based in Wales resulted in a series of poor results – and failure to qualify for the 2006 World Cup. When the policy was reversed the team immediately recorded their best Six Nations performance, with a victory over France in 2006, wins over Scotland in 2006 & 2007, ending a ten-year drought of wins against their Celtic opponents, and culminating with victory over England in 2009 on their way to a Triple Crown. The National 7s squad lifted the European 7s title in 2006, beating England in the final but narrowly failed to secure a place in the 2009 Rugby World Cup 7s. In 2007 Wales also re-entered the FIRA Championship, using the tournament to give tournament experience to its development team.

In November 2021, the Welsh Rugby Union announced that they would be offering 12-month contracts to Wales Women for the first time in its history. The contracts took effect on 1 January 2022.

== Players ==
=== Current squad ===
Sean Lynn named Kate Williams as the sole captain for the campaign on 20 March 2026, with co-captain Alex Callender ruled out of the tournament with injury. He announced the 38-player squad on 25 March.

Head coach: (Wales) Sean Lynn

Player	Position	Date of birth (age)	Caps	Club/province
Kelsey Jones	Hooker	4 September 1997 (aged 28)	52	(England) Gloucester–Hartpury
Carys Phillips	Hooker	12 November 1992 (aged 33)	87	(England) Harlequins
Molly Reardon	Hooker	22 September 2003 (aged 22)	12	(Wales) Gwalia Lightning
Katherine Baverstock	Prop	17 September 2002 (aged 23)	1	(England) Leicester Tigers
Maisie Davies	Prop	17 August 2005 (aged 20)	12	(England) Bristol Bears / (Wales) Gwalia Lightning
Elan Jones	Prop	4 November 2005 (aged 20)	0	(Wales) Brython Thunder
Stella Orrin	Prop	11 January 2006 (aged 20)	0	(England) Bristol Bears / (Wales) Brython Thunder
Gwenllian Pyrs	Prop	28 November 1997 (aged 28)	51	(England) Sale Sharks
Donna Rose	Prop	5 June 1991 (aged 34)	37	(England) Saracens
Jenni Scoble	Prop	28 March 1993 (aged 33)	8	(Wales) Gwalia Lightning
Sisilia Tuipulotu	Prop	14 August 2003 (aged 22)	31	(England) Gloucester–Hartpury / (Wales) Brython Thunder
Gwen Crabb	Second row	28 June 1999 (aged 26)	39	(Wales) Brython Thunder
Natalia John	Second row	15 February 1996 (aged 30)	48	(England) Bristol Bears / (Wales) Brython Thunder
Alaw Pyrs	Second row	12 October 2005 (aged 20)	10	(England) Gloucester–Hartpury / (Wales) Gwalia Lightning
Tilly Vucaj	Second row	3 November 2005 (aged 20)	2	(England) Gloucester–Hartpury / (Wales) Gwalia Lightning
Alisha Butchers	Flanker	14 June 1997 (aged 28)	54	(England) Bristol Bears / (Wales) Brython Thunder
Kate Williams	Flanker	5 April 2000 (aged 26)	24	(England) Gloucester–Hartpury / (Wales) Brython Thunder
Jorja Aiono	Number 8	29 June 2003 (aged 22)	0	(England) Gloucester–Hartpury / (Wales) Brython Thunder
Georgia Evans	Back row	29 January 1997 (aged 29)	43	(England) Saracens
Bryonie King	Back row	14 August 2003 (aged 22)	12	(England) Bristol Bears / (Wales) Gwalia Lightning
Bethan Lewis	Back row	19 February 1999 (aged 27)	61	(England) Gloucester–Hartpury / (Wales) Gwalia Lightning
Branwen Metcalfe	Back row	27 September 2006 (aged 19)	1	(England) Gloucester–Hartpury / (Wales) Brython Thunder
Kendall Waudby	Back row	22 September 2002 (aged 23)	0	(England) Loughborough Lightning
Keira Bevan	Scrum-half	28 April 1997 (aged 28)	78	(England) Bristol Bears
Sian Jones	Scrum-half	3 December 2004 (aged 21)	13	(England) Gloucester–Hartpury / (Wales) Gwalia Lightning
Seren Lockwood	Scrum-half	28 October 2006 (aged 19)	4	(England) Gloucester–Hartpury / (Wales) Brython Thunder
Lleucu George	Fly-half	12 January 2000 (aged 26)	35	(England) Gloucester–Hartpury
Kayleigh Powell	Fly-half	18 February 1999 (aged 27)	28	(England) Harlequins
Carys Cox	Centre	5 November 1998 (aged 27)	23	(England) Trailfinders
Hannah Dallavalle	Centre	14 November 1996 (aged 29)	69	(England) Gloucester–Hartpury
Jenna De Vera	Centre	25 December 2003 (aged 22)	0	(England) Bristol Bears
Courtney Keight	Centre	27 December 1997 (aged 28)	28	(England) Sale Sharks / (Wales) Brython Thunder
Savannah Picton-Powell	Centre	28 November 2003 (aged 22)	0	(England) Bristol Bears / (Wales) Brython Thunder
Kelsie Webster	Centre	3 September 2003 (aged 22)	0	(Wales) Gwalia Lightning
Jasmine Joyce	Wing	9 October 1995 (aged 30)	53	(England) Bristol Bears / (Wales) Brython Thunder
Lisa Neumann	Wing	23 December 1993 (aged 32)	51	(England) Harlequins / (Wales) Brython Thunder
Nikita Prothero	Wing	11 November 2001 (aged 24)	0	(England) Sale Sharks / (Wales) Gwalia Lightning
Seren Singleton	Wing	28 November 2005 (aged 20)	0	(England) Bristol Bears / (Wales) Brython Thunder

=== Contracted players ===
On 26 September 2024, the Welsh Rugby Union confirmed it had awarded full-time contracts to 37 Wales senior players for the 2024–25 season.

Wales Contracted Players (2024–25)
Props: Abbey Constable; Gwenllian Pyrs; Donna Rose; Sisilia Tuipulotu; Hookers: Rosie Carr; Kelsey Jones; Carys Phillips; Molly Reardon; Locks: Gwen Crabb; Georgia Evans; Abbie Fleming; Natalia John	Back row: Alex Callender; Gwennan Hopkins; Alisha Joyce-Butchers; Bryonie King; Bethan Lewis; Kate Williams; Scrum-halves: Keira Bevan; Megan Davies; Sian Jones; Ffion Lewis; Fly-halves: Lleucu George; Niamh Terry; Robyn Wilkins	Centres: Carys Cox; Hannah Jones; Kerin Lake; Catherine Richards; Megan Webb; Wings: Hannah Bluck; Jasmine Joyce-Butchers; Courtney Keight; Lisa Neumann; Full-backs: Jenny Hesketh; Nel Metcalfe; Kayleigh Powell

=== Notable players ===
- Liza Burgess - Inducted into the 2018 World Rugby Hall of Fame.
- Rafiuke Taylor - In 2019, became Wales women's first ever dual code rugby international.

=== Award winners ===
==== World Rugby Awards ====
The following Wales players have been recognised at the World Rugby Awards since 2001:

World Rugby Women's 15s Dream Team of the Year
Year	Forwards		Backs		Total
Year	No.	Players	No.	Players	Total
2021	—		15.	Jasmine Joyce-Butchers	1

==== Six Nations Awards ====
The following Wales players have been recognised in the Women's Six Nations Awards since 2020:

Six Nations Team of the Championship
Year	Forwards		Backs		Total
Year	No.	Players	No.	Players	Total
2022	8.	Sioned Harries	—		1
2023	3.	Sisilia Tuipulotu	—		1
2024	—				0

Six Nations Player of the Championship
Year	Nominees	Winners
2023	Sisilia Tuipulotu	—

== Records ==
=== World Cup ===
Rugby World Cup
Year	Round	Position	GP	W	D	L	PF	PA
(Wales) 1991	Plate quarter-finals	N/A	3	0	1	2	18	39
(Scotland) 1994	3rd Place Playoff	4th	5	3	0	2	63	96
(Netherlands) 1998	11th Place Playoff	11th	5	3	0	2	181	75
(Spain) 2002	9th Place Playoff	10th	4	2	0	2	126	50
(Canada) 2006	Did not participate							
(England) 2010	9th Place Playoff	9th	5	2	0	3	91	109
(France) 2014	7th Place Playoff	8th	5	1	0	4	48	147
(Ireland) 2017	7th Place Playoff	7th	5	2	0	3	78	143
(New Zealand) 2021	Quarter-final	—	4	1	0	3	40	139
(England) 2025	Pool Stage	—	3	0	0	3	33	108
(Australia) 2029	TBD							
(United States) 2033	TBD							
Total	9/10	4th	39	14	1	24	678	906
Champions Runners-up Third place Fourth place / Home venue

=== Overall ===
(Full internationals only)
Correct as of 13 April 2024

Rugby: Wales internationals 1987–
Opponent	First game	Played	Won	Drawn	Lost	Percentage
Australia	2002	6	0	0	6	0.00%
Canada	1991	14	2	2	10	14.29%
England	1987	41	2	0	39	4.88%
France	1994	29	4	0	25	13.79%
Germany	1998	2	2	0	0	100.00%
Hong Kong	2017	2	2	0	0	100.00%
Japan	2017	2	1	0	1	50.00%
Ireland	1996	31	17	0	14	54.84%
Italy	1998	22	13	1	8	59.09%
Kazakhstan	1994	5	3	0	2	60.00%
Netherlands	1988	5	2	0	3	40.00%
New Zealand	1991	7	0	0	7	0.00%
Russia	1998	2	2	0	0	100.00%
Samoa	2002	1	0	0	1	0.00%
Scotland	1993	36	20	0	16	55.56%
South Africa	2004	8	6	0	2	75.00%
Spain	1991	11	4	0	7	36.36%
Sweden	2007	3	2	0	1	66.67%
United States	1993	6	2	0	4	33.33%
Summary	1987	244	81	3	151	33.20%
