= RugbyFest 1990 =

Tournament details
- Host nation: New Zealand
- Dates: 1990-08-19 – 1990-09-01
- No. of nations: 4

Final positions
- Champions: New Zealand
- Runner-up: United States

Tournament statistics
- Matches played: 7

RugbyFest 1990 (officially the "Women's World Rugby Festival") was a two-week festival of women's rugby, held in Christchurch, New Zealand between 19 August and 1 September 1990. The event has been inflated sometimes to the status of a mini-world cup. In reality with only four teams taking part, and lacking major nations such as France, England and Canada, it was never that.

== Status of RugbyFest internationals ==
Teams from Asia, North America and Europe took part alongside local sides in a series of 15-a-side fixtures. Participants included four "national" teams (originally there were to have been five, but Japan withdrew) and featured what are held by many to be the first internationals ever played by New Zealand and USSR/Russia.

In practice, there is some dispute about how "official" the national teams were, not least because in some cases there was not yet a national women's governing body to grant official status.

For example, the USA RFU considers all games by the USA team against "national" XVs at the tournament to be official "tests" whereas the New Zealand (or at least the New Zealand rugby almanack) lists the games as unofficial "New Zealand XV" fixtures - but includes data from the tournament in its official player statistics.

As the IRB provides no official ruling or listing of women's rugby internationals (the only list of any sort appears here), it can only be for the reader to decide on the status of these games.

== "International" fixtures ==
=== Final table ===
Pos	Nation	Pld	W	D	L	PF	PA	PD	Pts
1	New Zealand	3	3	0	0	73	3	+70	6
2	United States	3	2	0	1	73	9	+64	4
3	Netherlands	3	1	0	2	12	98	−86	2
4	Soviet Union	3	0	0	3	4	52	−48	0

Source: https://www.rugbydatabase.co.nz/competition/index.php?competitionId=783

=== Results ===
26 August 1990

New Zealand	56–0	Netherlands

Christchurch

28 August 1990

New Zealand	8–0	Soviet Union

Christchurch

29 August 1990

Netherlands	0–38	United States

Christchurch

30 August 1990

Netherlands	12–4	Soviet Union

Christchurch

30 August 1990

New Zealand	9–3	United States

Christchurch

31 August 1990

United States	32–0	Soviet Union

Christchurch

1 September 1990

New Zealand	12–4	World XV

Christchurch

== Other "national team" fixtures ==
The festival also included a number of games between the "national" teams and local sides. Results were:

Netherlands:

19 August 1990

Canterbury "B"	4-12	Netherlands

20 August 1990

Crusadettes	20-0	Netherlands

20 August 1990

Burnside-Merrivale	6-12	Netherlands

21 August 1990

Canterbury "A"	34-4	Netherlands

22 August 1990

Netherlands	w/o	Tokyo

23 August 1990

Paremata-Plimmerton	beat	Netherlands

(score not recorded)

24 August 1990

Netherlands	beat	Nagoya

(score not recorded)

25 August 1990

Netherlands	beat	Tokyo

(score not recorded)

27 August 1990

Wellington	10-4	Netherlands

1 September 1990

Auckland	25-0	Netherlands

United States:

27 August 1990

Canterbury	0-12	United States

28 August 1990

Auckland	0-6	United States

Soviet Union:

19 August 1990

Canterbury "A"	20-0	Soviet Union

20 August 1990

Paremata-Plimmerton	0-0	Soviet Union

26 August 1990

Belfast	16-14	Soviet Union

27 August 1990

Auckland	25-0	Soviet Union

== See also ==
- Women's Rugby World Cup
- Women's international rugby union
- 1988 Women's Rugby European Cup (first women's international rugby tournament)
- 1982 Netherlands v France women's rugby match (first women's international rugby match)
