= Netherlands women's national rugby union team =

Netherlands
- Union: Dutch Rugby Union
- Head coach: Gareth Gilbert
- Captain: Linde van der Velden
First colours

World Rugby ranking
- Current: 17 (as of 22 September 2025)

First international
- Netherlands 0–4 France (Utrecht, Netherlands; 13 June 1982)

Biggest win
- Denmark 3–141 Netherlands (Grenade, France; 2 May 2004)

Biggest defeat
- England 91–3 Netherlands (Belluno, Italy; 19 April 1999)

World Cup
- Appearances: 3 (First in 1991)

Women's World Rugby Rankings Top 20 rankings as of 2 November 2026
Rank	Change*	Team	Points
1	Steady	England	94.20
2	Steady	New Zealand	93.18
3	Steady	Canada	91.68
4	Steady	France	85.00
5	Steady	Ireland	78.29
6	Steady	United States	77.50
7	Steady	Australia	77.18
8	Steady	Italy	71.99
9	Steady	Scotland	71.25
10	Steady	South Africa	70.76
11	Steady	Wales	70.12
12	Steady	Fiji	66.65
13	Steady	Japan	65.00
14	Steady	Spain	63.22
15	Steady	Samoa	58.31
16	Steady	Netherlands	58.29
17	Steady	Hong Kong	55.72
18	Steady	Russia	55.10
19	Steady	Kazakhstan	53.95
20	Steady	Germany	51.12
*Change from the previous ranking update

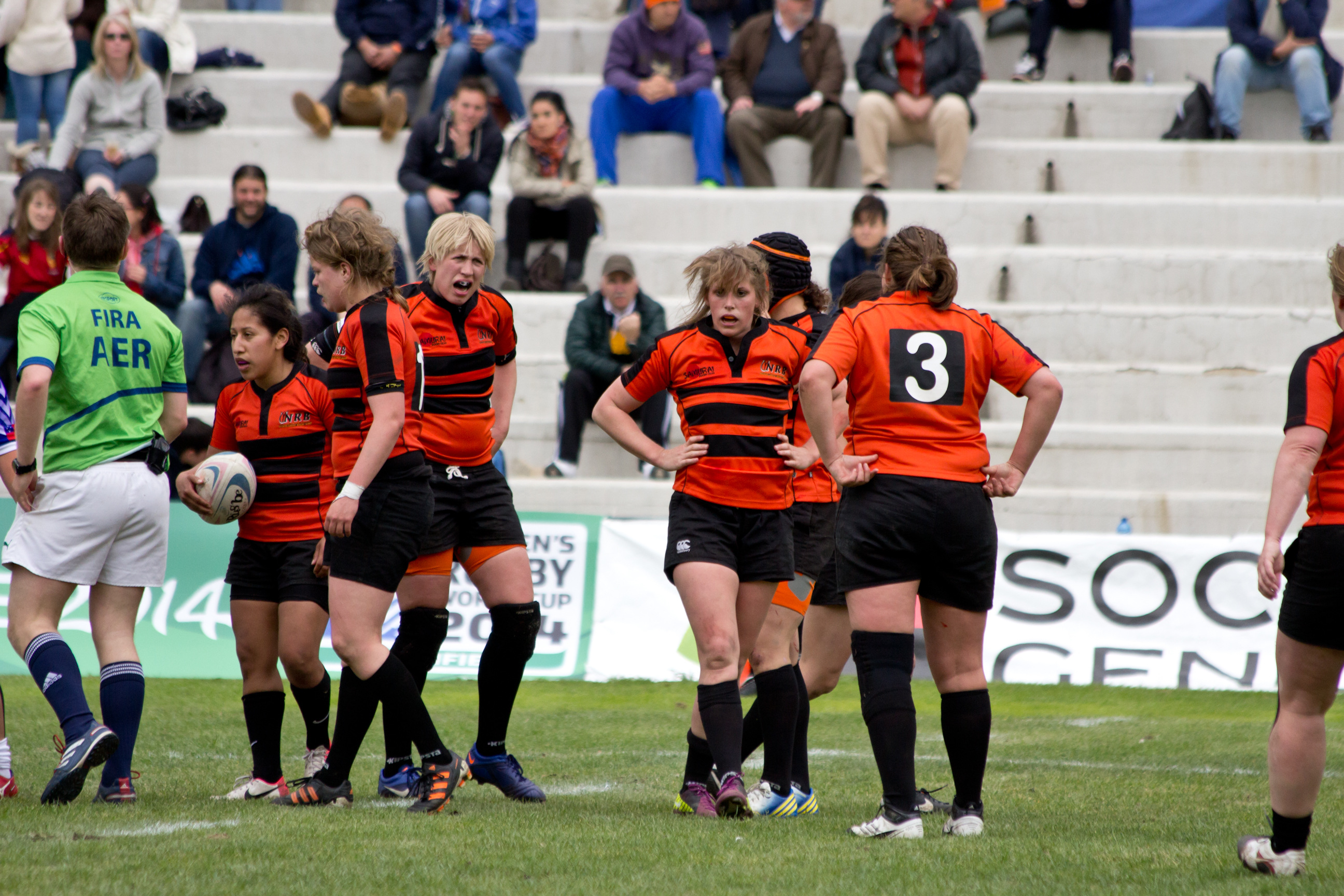
Netherlands during the 2013 Women's European Qualification Tournament.

The Netherlands women's national rugby union team are a national sporting side of Netherlands, representing them at rugby union. The side played the women's first international test match against France in 1982.

== History ==
The Netherlands' women's national rugby union team hosted the first ever women's international women's rugby union match. This match took place in Utrecht on June 13, 1982. France won against the Netherlands with 4–0.

The Netherlands made their debut at the 1991 World Cup. They finished in 7th place out of 12 teams. They hosted the 1998 World Cup and qualified for the 2002 World Cup, where they finished 13th and 15th.

Women's rugby has increased in popularity in the Netherlands in the past decades. The airing of the 2015 World Cup on national television has further attributed to the increase in popularity.

On 16 March 2024, the Netherlands won the play-off, for the 2024 WXV 3 competition, against Colombia, who finished at the bottom of the inaugural WXV 3 standings in 2023. By virtue of being the highest nation in World Rugby's Women's Rankings who did not take part in the inaugural edition, the Netherlands were given the opportunity to play for a spot in this year's tournament.

== Records ==
=== Overall ===
(Full internationals only, updated to 14 May 2024)

Rugby: Netherlands internationals 1982-
Opponent	First game	Played	Won	Drawn	Lost	Percentage
Belgium	2000	8	8	0	0	100.00%
Brazil	2008	2	1	1	0	66.66%
Canada	1998	1	0	0	1	0.00%
Colombia	2024	1	1	0	0	100.00%
Denmark	2003	2	2	0	0	100.00%
England	1997	4	0	0	4	0.00%
Finland	2012	1	1	0	0	100.00%
France	1982	12	1	0	11	8.33%
Germany	1992	17	16	0	1	94.12%
Great Britain	1987	2	0	0	2	0.00%
Hong Kong	2019	3	1	0	2	33.33%
Ireland	1998	3	0	0	3	0.00%
Italy	1988	8	2	0	6	25.00%
Japan	2002	2	1	0	1	50.00%
Kazakhstan	1999	2	0	0	2	0.00%
New Zealand	1990	1	0	0	1	0.00%
Norway	2004	2	2	0	0	100.00%
Portugal	2024	1	1	0	0	100.00%
Russia	1998	4	3	0	1	75.00%
Samoa	2013	1	0	0	1	0.00%
Scotland	1995	6	1	0	5	16.67%
South Africa	2006	2	0	0	2	0.00%
Spain	1995	6	0	0	6	0.00%
Sweden	1984	19	16	0	3	84.21%
Switzerland	2014	1	1	0	0	100.00%
Soviet Union	1990	2	2	0	0	100.00%
United States	1990	3	0	0	3	0.00%
Wales	2001	5	3	0	2	60.00%
Summary	1982	136	69	0	67	50.74%

=== Rugby World Cup ===
Rugby World Cup
Year	Round	Position	GP	W	D	L	PF	PA
(Wales) 1991	Plate semi-finals	N/A	4	2	0	2	34	18
(Scotland) 1994	Did not participate							
(Netherlands) 1998	Shield final	13th	5	3	0	2	197	40
(Spain) 2002	15th place playoff	15th	4	1	0	3	33	180
(Canada) 2006	Did not participate							
(England) 2010	Did Not Qualify							
(France) 2014	Did Not Qualify							
(Ireland) 2017	Did Not Qualify							
(New Zealand) 2021	Did Not Qualify							
(England) 2025	Did Not Qualify							
(Australia) 2029	TBD							
(United States) 2033	TBD							
Total	3/9	13th^{†}	13	6	0	7	264	238
Champion Runner-up Third place Fourth: * Tied placing ^{†} Best placing / Home venue

== Players ==
=== Recent squad ===
Netherlands 30-player squad for the 2024 WXV 3 competition in Dubai.

Player	Position	Date of birth (age)	Caps	Club/province
Anniek Nauta	??	10 March 2000 (aged 24)		
Anouk Veerkamp	Hooker	29 January 2002 (aged 22)	7	(England) Hartpury University
Anoushka Beukers	Hooker	15 September 1999 (aged 25)	8	(Netherlands) Dames Bredase RC
Brechtje Karst	Prop	10 March 2003 (aged 21)	5	
Elisabeth Boot	Loose forward	16 September 1998 (aged 26)	5	
Gwen van der Schoot	??			(Netherlands) RC Delft
Inger Jongerius	Lock	12 December 1995 (aged 28)	12	
Isa Prins	Lock	4 June 2003 (aged 21)	7	
Jara Bunnik	??	2 May 2001 (aged 23)	2	
Julia Morauw	Prop	22 June 2002 (aged 22)	7	
Linde van der Velden (c)	Loose forward	20 February 1995 (aged 29)	14	(England) Exeter Chiefs
Mariet Luijken	Loose forward	29 November 2003 (aged 20)	7	
Mhina de Vos	Forward	24 April 1998 (aged 26)	8	
Morgane ter Cock	??	9 July 2003 (aged 21)	1	
Nicky Dix	Prop	7 March 2000 (aged 24)	14	
Noah Demba	??	6 October 1998 (aged 25)		
Sydney de Weijer	Prop	17 June 2003 (aged 21)	7	(Netherlands) Amsterdamse Atletiek Club
Emma van Traa	??	2 April 2006 (aged 18)	1	(Netherlands) The Vets
Esmee Ligtvoet	Scrum-half	23 June 2003 (aged 21)	8	
Gaya van Nifterik	Wing	16 October 1998 (aged 25)	5	
Isa Spoler	Centre	27 June 2004 (aged 20)	4	
Jet Metz	Fly-half	19 September 2003 (aged 21)	5	HSOB Rugby Club and Canterbury Rugby FPC but hasn't officially played yet for Canterbury Rugby FPC
Kika Mulling	Wing	6 April 1999 (aged 25)	3	
Lieve Stallmann	Fullback	21 January 2000 (aged 24)	10	
Linneke Gevers	Centre	9 March 1998 (aged 26)	2	
Lisa Egberts	Scrum-half	3 December 2001 (aged 22)	9	
Marit Lemmens	Back	20 April 1998 (aged 26)	8	
Pien Selbeck	Centre	14 October 1984 (aged 39)	13	
Pleuni Kievit	Fullback	10 March 1997 (aged 27)	4	
Senne Hoog	Wing	7 June 2005 (aged 19)	4	

=== Coaching staff ===
Position	Name
Head Coach	Gareth Gilbert
Assistant Coach	Sander van der Loos
Manager	Josina Verweij
Physio	Milla Lappalainen
Water Carrier 1	Mathew Cripps
Water Carrier 2, S&C	Dino Bozic

== See also ==
- Rugby union in the Netherlands
