= 1991 Women's Rugby World Cup =

Cwpan Rygbi'r Byd 1991 i Ferched

Tournament details
- Host nation: Wales
- Dates: 6 April – 14 April 1991
- No. of nations: 12

Final positions
- Champions: United States (1st title)
- Runner-up: England

Tournament statistics
- Matches played: 23
- Top scorer(s): (France) Fabienne Saudin (24)
- Most tries: (France) Fabienne Saudin (6)
- Points scored: 526 (average 22.87 per match)

The 1991 Women's Rugby World Cup was the first Women's Rugby World Cup. The tournament was not approved by the International Rugby Board (IRB), yet it still went ahead despite the disapproval of the sport's governing body. France confirmed their participation only minutes before the draw was made on 26 February. Representatives of the IRB, WRFU and RFU attended the final, but it was not until 2009 that the IRB officially, and retrospectively, recognised and endorsed the event.

The tournament was held in and around Cardiff, Wales. Twelve teams competed for the trophy, divided into four pools of three teams each. Each team played three pool matches on 6 April, 8 April, and 10 April; the semi-finals were played on 12 and 14 April. This meant that the championship teams played five matches over nine days, with only one rest day between matches.

The tournament champions were the United States, who defeated England 19–6 in the final at Cardiff Arms Park in front of almost 3,000 fans. The teams that failed to qualify for the semi-finals took part in a "plate" tournament between 11 and 13 April.

== Organisation ==
The tournament was created and largely organised by four women who were with the Richmond Women's Rugby Club – Deborah Griffin, Sue Dorrington, Alice Cooper, and Mary Forsyth.

The International Rugby Board decided not to sanction or support the tournament. The tournament was run on a very small and tightly controlled budget. The organisers considered a number of host cities, and chose Cardiff, Wales for several reasons — because most of the teams were European it made sense to hold the tournament in Europe; the organisers were looking for a strong rugby community, which Wales possessed; and Cardiff offered help, including paying for the welcome ceremony and closing dinner.

The tournament made a financial loss. Due in some part to the fact that the men's 1991 Rugby World Cup was also being held in Europe that year, with some matches staged in Wales, the women's tournament experienced disappointing attendance revenues and the failure to attract television contracts or sponsorship. Another financial drain was due to the Soviet Union team being unable to pay its hotel and transport bills, as Soviets were not permitted to leave the country with hard currency. The team had hoped to survive by bartering and selling goods (such as vodka) and trinkets (such as Russian dolls); these activities were curtailed after they aroused the attention of HM Customs and Excise, and the Soviets relied on contributions by local Cardiff businesses to survive.

The financial loss was made good. Anonymous businessmen pledged at the post-tournament celebratory dinner to make up a portion of the deficit. The English Rugby Football Union made good on the remainder of the deficit.

== Teams ==
The organizers invited multiple rugby unions to participate, and 12 nations confirmed their participation. The teams had varying degrees of international experience. Among the more experienced teams were the Netherlands with 20 caps and France with 18 caps, dating back to their first meeting in 1982. Among the lesser experienced teams were Japan with no prior caps, and Spain with one prior cap from a 1989 0–28 drubbing by the French.

== Match Officials ==
Referee	Matches Officiated
(United States) Laurel Lockett	
(Wales) Les Peard	Final (England v United States)
(Wales) Gareth Simmonds	Semifinal (New Zealand v USA)
(Wales) Ken Rowlands	Semifinal (England v France)
A. Evans	Plate Final (Canada v Spain); Holland v USA; Wales v Canada; Italy v Spain; Touch Judge Final (England v United States)
D. Morgan	Wales v NZ; Touch Judge Final (England v United States)

== Pool stage ==
=== Pool 1 ===
Team	Pld	W	D	L	PF	PA	PD
New Zealand	2	2	0	0	48	14	+34
Canada	2	0	1	1	17	33	−16
Wales	2	0	1	1	15	33	−18

6 April 1991

New Zealand	24–8	Canada

Glamorgan Wanderers

8 April 1991

Wales	9–9	Canada

Glamorgan Wanderers

10 April 1991

Wales	6–24	New Zealand

Llanharan

=== Pool 2 ===
Team	Pld	W	D	L	PF	PA	PD
France	2	2	0	0	99	0	+99
Sweden	2	1	0	1	20	37	−17
Japan	2	0	0	2	0	82	−82

6 April 1991

France	62–0	Japan

Aberavon

8 April 1991

France	37–0	Sweden

Glamorgan Wanderers

10 April 1991

Japan	0–20	Sweden

Llanharan

=== Pool 3 ===
Team	Pld	W	D	L	PF	PA	PD
United States	2	2	0	0	53	0	+53
Netherlands	2	1	0	1	28	7	+21
Soviet Union	2	0	0	2	0	74	−74

6 April 1991

Netherlands	0–7	United States

Pontypool

8 April 1991

Netherlands	28–0	Soviet Union

Llanharan

10 April 1991

United States	46–0	Soviet Union

Glamorgan Wanderers

=== Pool 4 ===
Team	Pld	W	D	L	PF	PA	PD
England	2	2	0	0	37	9	+28
Spain	2	1	0	1	13	19	−6
Italy	2	0	0	2	16	38	−22

6 April 1991

England	12–0	Spain

Swansea

8 April 1991

England	25–9	Italy

Llanharan

10 April 1991

Italy	7–13	Spain

Glamorgan Wanderers

== Plate ==
Quarter-finals
11 April – Cardiff
Canada	38
Soviet Union	0
11 April – Cardiff
Italy	18
Sweden	0
11 April – Cardiff
Wales	3
Netherlands	6
11 April – Cardiff
Japan	0
Spain	30

Semi-finals
12 April – Cardiff
Canada	6
Italy	0
12 April – Cardiff
Netherlands	0
Spain	8

Final
13 April – Cardiff
Canada	19
Spain	4

=== Plate quarter-finals ===
11 April 1991

Canada	38–0	Soviet Union

Cardiff

11 April 1991

Italy	18–0	Sweden

Cardiff

11 April 1991

Wales	3–6	Netherlands

Cardiff

11 April 1991

Japan	0–30	Spain

Cardiff

=== Plate semi-finals ===
12 April 1991

Canada	6–0	Italy

Cardiff

12 April 1991

Netherlands	0–8	Spain

Cardiff

=== Plate final ===
13 April 1991

Canada	19–4	Spain

Cardiff

== Cup ==
Semi-finals
12 April – Cardiff
England	13
France	0
12 April – Cardiff
New Zealand	0
United States	7

Final
14 April – Cardiff
England	6
United States	19

=== Semi-finals ===
12 April 1991

New Zealand	0–7	United States

Cardiff Arms Park

12 April 1991

England	13–0	France

Cardiff Arms Park

=== Third place playoff ===
Officially, third place is considered to be shared between France and New Zealand.

However, a match between a French and a New Zealand XV did take place on 14 April, France winning 3–0. But it is clear from records held by the RFU Rugby Museum that the game was not scheduled as part of the tournament and is not included in any official tournament records after the event.

Participants record that New Zealand fielded a weakened team based around players who had not made many appearances in the tournament. New Zealand awarded no caps – indeed the game does not appear in any official Black Fern records. On the other hand, the French RFU have included the game in a recently published official list of internationals, and do appear to have awarded caps.

As the status of the game is disputed, it is also not currently accepted as being a test match.

=== Final ===
14 April 1991

England	6–19	United States

Cardiff

== Organisers ==
- Deborah Griffin — Chair
- Sue Dorrington — Commercial manager
- Alice Cooper — Press and PR
- Mary Forsyth — Financial director

== See also ==
- Women's Rugby World Cup
- Rugby World Cup (men's)
- 1991 Rugby World Cup (men's)
- Rugby World Cup Sevens

== Sources ==
- Rugby World Cup Women’s Stats Archive
- Women's Rugby Data
