= 2026 Women's Elite Rugby season =

Season in American women's rugby union

2026 Women's Elite Rugby
- Countries: United States
- Number of teams: 6
- Date: May 2 – July 26, 2026
- Matches played: 31

Official website
- www.womenseliterugby.us

The 2026 Women's Elite Rugby season was the second season of the Women's Elite Rugby (WER) league based in the United States.

The regular season runs from May 2 to July 26, with each of the six teams competing in 10 games each.

== Teams and locations ==
The 2026 edition of Women's Elite Rugby was contested by six teams spread around the United States.

Locations of teams in the United States competing in the 2025 season.
1 Bay Breakers
2 Boston Banshees
3 Chicago Tempest
4 Denver Onyx
5 New York Exiles
6 Twin Cities Gemini

Team	Head coach	Captain	Stadium
Bay Breakers	Hannah Stolba	TBA	Heart Health Park
Boston Banshees	Kittery Wagner-Ruiz	Akwele Okine/Amanda Schweitzer (co-captains)	Veterans Memorial Stadium
Chicago Tempest	Kristin Zdanczewicz	TBA	Village of Lisle-Benedictine University Sports Complex
Denver Onyx	Sarah Chobot	TBA	Infinity Park
New York Exiles	Diego Maquieira	Misha Green-Yotts	The Stadium at Memorial Field
Twin Cities Gemini	Sylvia Braaten	Brigon Mior	TCO Stadium

== Regular season ==
=== Standings ===
Team	GP	W	L	Road Wins	BP	Points	Qualification
Denver Onyx	9	8	1	3	8	40	Advance to Grand Final
Bay Breakers	9	7	2	3	9	37	Advance to Grand Final
TC Gemini	9	6	3	2	10	34	
New York Exiles	9	3	6	0	3	15	
Boston Banshees	9	2	7	0	4	12	
Chicago Tempest	9	1	8	0	4	8	

=== Matches ===
Home \ Away	BRE	BOS	CHI	DEN	NY	TC
Bay Breakers	—	57–19	66–17	36–19	46–14	25–17
Boston Banshees	25–40	—	20–18	19–52	38–19	12–48
Chicago Tempest	21–45	36–32	—	17–52	19–24	22–78
Denver Onyx	38–33	63–14	45–21	—	42–14	54–29
New York Exiles	12–46	28–22	40–19	19–53	—	27–24
Twin Cities Gemini	42–10	50–15	61–5	26–59	41–19	—

Updated to match(es) played on June 16 2026. Source:
Legend: Blue = home team win; Yellow = draw; Red = away team win.

=== Scheduled matches ===
==== Week 1 (May 2-3) ====
May 2
17:00 EDT (UTC−4)

Boston Banshees	38-19	New York Exiles
Try: Pantor; Cunningham; Santosuosso; Weigel; Kuffel; Kronish; Con: Wild (4/6)	Report	Try: Jex (2); O'Neill; Con: Owens (2/3)

Veterans Memorial Stadium
Referee: Katherine Roth

May 2
19:00 CDT (UTC−5)

Chicago Tempest	22-78	Twin Cities Gemini
Try: Fisch; O'Neal; Murphy; Anderson; Con: Fisch (1/4)	Report	Try: Johnson; Bauer; Smith; Rios Mena (3); Liu; Jalosuo; Pyrz; Ahnen; Pfersch; Con: Mior (3); Headland (7); Pen: Headland (1)

Village of Lisle-Benedictine University Sports Complex
Referee: Lindsey Oliver

May 3
16:00 PDT (UTC−5)

Bay Breakers	36-19	Denver Onyx
Try: McGrath (2); Cooper; Liulamaga; Vogel; Edwards; Con: Bernadel-Huey (3/6)	Report	Try: Simmons; Bailey; Hann; Con: Cunningham (2/3)

Heart Health Park
Referee: Kahlil Harrison

==== Week 2 (May 9-10) ====
May 9
17:00 EDT (UTC−4)

New York Exiles	12-46	Bay Breakers
Try: Green-Yotts; Parker; Con: Owens (1/2)	Report	Try: McGrath; Carillo; Thacker (2); Bernadel-Huey; Lynch; Hart; Con: Siano (1); Bernadel-Huey (3); Pen: Siano (1/1) 82'

The Stadium at Memorial Field
Referee: Kathleen Roche

May 10
17:00 MDT (UTC−6)

Chicago Tempest	36-32	Boston Banshees
Try: Conway Morrissey; Krahn; Murphy; Lohaus; Anderson; Mesina; Con: Fisch (3/5)	Report	Try: Pantor; Kronish; Vincze; Weigel (2); Durden; Con: Wild (1/6)

Village of Lisle-Benedictine University Sports Complex

May 10
14:00 CDT (UTC−5)

Denver Onyx	54-29	Twin Cities Gemini
Try: Sheveland; Kimball; Wilkins (2); Schier; Hamdan; Parr; Oglesby; Con: Cunningham (7/8)	Report	Try: Mior; Rios Mena (2); Pyrz; Jacobs; Con: Headland (2/5)

Infinity Park

==== Week 3 (May 16-17) ====
May 16
17:00 EDT (UTC−4)

Boston Banshees	19-52	Denver Onyx
Try: Santosuosso; Weigel; Kronish; Con: Wild (2/3)	Report	Try: Parr; Kitlinkski (4); LaVigne; Decker; Broughton; Con: Cunningham (6/8)

Veterans Memorial Stadium
Referee: Lindsey Oliver

May 17
14:00 EDT (UTC−6)

New York Exiles	40-19	Chicago Tempest
Try: McWilliams; Caldon; O'Sullivan Roche (3); Salud; Con: Owens (5/6)	Report	Try: Korpitz; Conway Morrissey; Mesina; Con: Fisch (2/3)

The Stadium at Memorial Field

May 17
17:00 CDT (UTC−5)

Twin Cities Gemini	42-10	Bay Breakers
Try: Jacobs (2); Brackett; Rios Mena; Leatherman; Pfersch; Con: Headland (6/6)	Report	Try: McGrath; Hart

TCO Stadium
Referee: Kahlil Harrison

==== Week 4 (May 30-31) ====
May 30
17:00 CDT (UTC−4)

Twin Cities Gemini	50-15	Boston Banshees
Try: Ahnen (3); Linck; Mior; Jacobs; Doerscher; Headland; Con: Headland (5/8)	Report	Try: Isaacs; Benson; Con: Wild (1/2)

TCO Stadium

May 31
14:00 EDT (UTC−6)

New York Exiles	19-53	Denver Onyx
Try: McWilliams; Parker; Lehman; Con: Owens (2/3)	Report	Try: Davis; Hann (2); Wilkins; Cunningham; Bullock (2); Parr (2); Con: Cunningham (4/9)

The Stadium at Memorial Field

May 31
17:00 PDT (UTC−5)

Bay Breakers	66-17	Chicago Tempest
Try: Overby (2); Liulamaga; Hart; Thacker; Tupou; Overby; McGrath; Lynch; Edwards; Tukuafu; Con: Bocek (4); Bernadel-Huey (4)	Report	Try: Lohaus; Westmoreland; Runge; Con: Krahn (1/3)

Heart Health Park

==== Week 5 (June 7) ====
June 7
18:00 EDT (UTC−4)

Boston Banshees	25-40	Bay Breakers
Try: McAlevey; Dunn; Quirion; Con: Wild (2/3); Pen: Wild (2)	Report	Try: Okpara (3); Thomas; Satini; Lynch; Con: Bocek (5/6)

Veterans Memorial Stadium

June 7
19:00 MDT (UTC−6)

Denver Onyx	45-21	Chicago Tempest
Try: Davis; Lally (2); Broughton; Hamdan; Parr; Van Dyk; Con: Wilkins (5/7)	Report	Try: Anderson; Lohaus; Con: Cohan (2); Pen: 1

Infinity Park

June 7
15:00 CDT (UTC−5)

Twin Cities Gemini	41-19	New York Exiles
Try: Moton-Tyler; Ahnen (2); Brackett; Pfersch; Headland; Jacobs; Con: Mior; Headland (2)	Report	Try: O'Sullivan Roche; Mango; Castillo; Con: Owens (2)

TCO Stadium

==== Week 6 (June 13-14) ====
June 13
14:00 EDT (UTC−4)

New York Exiles	27-24	Twin Cities Gemini
Try: McWilliams; Jex; O'Sullivan Roche; Castillo; Con: Owens (2); Pen: Owens	Report	Try: Jalosuo; Headland; Bauer; Pfersch; Con: Headland (2)

The Stadium at Memorial Field

June 13
17:00 MDT (UTC−6)

Denver Onyx	63-14	Boston Banshees
Try: Broughton (3); Harkavy; Hamdan; Kitlinski (2); Parr (3); Bailey; Con: Parr (4)	Report	Try: Vincze; Armatage; Con: Vincze (2)

Infinity Park

June 14
17:00 CDT (UTC−5)

Chicago Tempest	10-57	Bay Breakers
Try: Anderson; Krahn	Report	Try: Overby (3); Thacker (2); Bocek; Okpara; Con: Nelson (1); Bernadel-Huey (1); Bocek (3)

Village of Lisle-Benedictine University Sports Complex

==== Week 7 (June 21) ====
June 21
15:00 MDT (UTC−4)

Denver Onyx	42-14	New York Exiles
Try: Solomon; Ottywill; Parr (3); Hall; Con: Wilkins (6/6)	Report	Try: Mango; Carroll; Con: Owens (2/2)

Infinity Park

June 21
17:00 PDT (UTC−6)

Bay Breakers	57-19	Boston Banshees
Try: Lynch (3); Satini (2); Cordero; Nelson (2); Liulamaga; Con: Bernadel-Huey (2); Bocek (4)	Report	Try: Armatage; Stathopoulos; Carlton; Con: Wild (2)

Heart Health Park

June 21
13:00 CDT (UTC−5)

Twin Cities Gemini	61-5	Chicago Tempest
Try: Hall; Headland; Mior; Ahnen (2); Johnson (2); Gallagher; Con: Headland (7)	Report	Try: Andrade

TCO Stadium

==== Week 8 (July 11-12) ====
July 11
15:00 EDT (UTC−4)

Boston Banshees	12-48	Twin Cities Gemini
Try: Dunn; Vance; Con: Armatage	Report	Try: Headland; Ahnen; Linck; Gilmour; Gallagher; Pfersch; Bauer; Brackett; Con: Headland (4)

Veterans Memorial Stadium

July 11
17:00 CDT (UTC−6)

Chicago Tempest	19-24	New York Exiles
Try: Conway Morrissey (2); Anderson; Con: Cohan (1); Korpitz (1)	Report	Try: Green-Yotts; Jex; Castillo; Carroll; Con: Owens (2)

Village of Lisle-Benedictine University Sports Complex

July 12
17:00 MDT (UTC−5)

Denver Onyx	38-33	Bay Breakers
Try: Wilkins (2); Brody; Broughton; Decker; Schier; Con: Wilkins (4)	Report	Try: Thacker; Okpara; Bocek; Cooper; Thomas Con: Bernadel-Huey (1); Bocek (3)

Infinity Park

==== Week 9 (July 18-19) ====
July 18
17:00 PDT (UTC−4)

New York Exiles	14-46	Bay Breakers
Try: Torres-brown; Green-Yotts; Con: Owens (2/2)	Report	Try: Hoese; Carrillo; Bernadel-Huey; Namosimalua; McGrath; Tupou; Liulamaga; Thacker; Con: Bernadel-Huey (2); Bocek (2)

Heart Health Park

July 18
17:00 EDT (UTC−6)

Boston Banshees	20-18	Chicago Tempest
Try: Brandt-Templeton; Wild; Weigel; Con: Vincze; Pen: Wild	Report	Try: Lohaus; Fischer; Anderson; Pen: Cohan

Veterans Memorial Stadium

July 19
17:00 CDT (UTC−5)

Twin Cities Gemini	26-59	Denver Onyx
Try: Ahnen (2); Bauer; Johnson; Con: Headland (3)	Report	Try: LaVigne; Cunningham; Hamdam; Brody (2); Oglesby; Ottwill; Van Dyk; Kitlinksi; Con: Wilkins (7)

TCO Stadium

==== Week 10 (July 25-26) ====
July 25
17:00 EDT (UTC−4)

New York Exiles	28-22	Boston Banshees
Try: O'Sullivan Roche; Torres-brown; Caldon; Lehman; Con: Owens (4)	Report	Try: Carlton; Schecter; Santosuosso; Stathopoulous; Con: Wild (1)

The Stadium at Memorial Field

July 26
18:00 PDT (UTC−6)

Bay Breakers	25-17	Twin Cities Gemini
Try: Jurkowski; Thomas; Bernadel-Huey; Con: Bernadel-Huey (2); Pen: Bernadel-Huey (2)	Report	Try: Headland; Liu; Pyrz; Con: Headland (1)

Heart Health Park

July 26
17:00 CDT (UTC−5)

Chicago Tempest	17-52	Denver Onyx
Try: Runge; Anderson; Con: Cohan (1); Kelly (1); Pen: Kelly (1)	Report	Try: Bullock; Decker (2); Davis; Solomon; Hamdam; Cunningham; Ottywill; Con: Cunningham (6)

Village of Lisle-Benedictine University Sports Complex

== Grand final (Legacy Cup) ==
August 8, 2026
19:00 MDT

Denver Onyx	24-17	Bay Breakers
	Report

Infinity Park
