= Tess Feury =

American rugby union player

- Born: March 15, 1996 (age 30)
- Height: 1.67 m (5 ft 5 1/2 in)
- Weight: 66 kg (146 lb; 10 st 6 lb)

Rugby union career
- Position: Full Back
Senior career
Years	Team	Apps	(Points)
2023–2025	Leicester Tigers	-	(5)
2025–	New York Exiles	1	(1)
International career
Years	Team	Apps	(Points)
2016–Present	United States	34	(7)

Tess Feury (born March 15, 1996) is an American rugby union player. She competed for the United States at the 2017, 2021 and 2025 Women's Rugby World Cups. She has captained the team on multiple occasions. She currently plays professionally for the Leicester Tigers in the Premiership Women's Rugby competition. Last year she played for the New York Exiles in the inaugural season of the Women's Elite Rugby competition. Tess is an ambassador for the Leicester Tigers Foundation & PitchIn Platform. Tess is also a Pediatric Nurse Practitioner.

== Early life and family ==
Feury was raised in Denville, New Jersey by Tom and KJ Feury. She grew up playing rugby; her father, Tom, was introduced to the sport in college. He started a flag rugby team, the Denville Dawgs, to allow his sons and daughter to play rugby. She has two brothers who played rugby at Pennsylvania State University and Middlebury College, and her mother also served as the president of Rugby New Jersey for several years. Feury attended Villa Walsh Academy for high school, where she played varsity soccer and ran track and field, and graduated in 2014.

Feury attended college at Penn State. In 2018, Feury graduated from Pennsylvania State University with a bachelor's in nursing. Feury has worked as a Pediatric Intensive Care Nurse at Morristown Medical Center.

== Rugby career ==
=== Youth, collegiate, and club level ===
While in high school, Feury played rugby sevens for the New Jersey Blaze, which won the high school girls championship in 2013, for the Atlantis rugby team, and for the Morris Rugby girl's high school team.

She was selected for the USA Rugby High School All-American team in sevens and fifteens rugby in 2013, 2014, and 2015, and trained with the United States national women's sevens team in Chula Vista, California.

Feury captained and played scrum-half for the 4th-place finishing United States Girls team at the 2014 Summer Youth Olympics in Nanjing, China. She was named the High School Rugby Player of the Year in 2014.

From 2014 to 2018, Feury played fullback and outside center for the Pennsylvania State University women's rugby team. The team won three national championships during that time, and Feury was a four-time Collegiate All-American. She was named the Big 10 Rugby Freshman of the Year in 2015, as well as the Most Valuable Player of the championship game in 2015.

Feury has also played with the New York Rugby Club in the Women's Premier League.

=== U.S. National Team ===
She made her debut for the United States in 2016 against England at the Women's Super Series in Salt Lake City, Utah. She was selected for the Eagles 2017 Women's Rugby World Cup squad. From 2016 to 2018, she was named to the USA Rugby Club Sevens National Championships All-Tournament Team.

In 2022, she was named in the Eagles squad for the Pacific Four Series in New Zealand. She was selected in the Eagles squad for the 2021 Rugby World Cup in New Zealand.

Feury was named in the Eagles traveling squad for the 2023 Pacific Four Series.

She was in the United States side that faced Japan in Los Angeles on 26 April 2025. On September 1, she was called up to the Eagles World Cup squad to replace Bulou Mataitoga who sustained an injury during training.

=== Professional leagues ===
She signed with the Leicester Tigers for the 2023–24 Premiership Women's Rugby season and has now played 3 seasons for the club. Feury played with the New York Exiles in the 2025 Women's Elite Rugby season.
