= List of professional sports teams in Minnesota =

Minnesota has a number of professional and semi-professional sports teams in various sports and leagues. Most are based in Minneapolis, though every major league team in the state is named for Minnesota itself.

== Active men's sports teams in Minnesota ==
Team	Sport	League	Division/Conference	Venue	Year founded
Minnesota Twins	Baseball	Major League Baseball	American League Central	Target Field	1961
St. Paul Saints	Baseball	International League	West Division	CHS Field	1993
Minnesota Vikings	Football	NFL	NFC North	U.S. Bank Stadium	1961
Minnesota Wild	Ice hockey	NHL	Central Division	Grand Casino Arena	2000
Minnesota Timberwolves	Basketball	NBA	Northwest Division	Target Center	1989
Minnesota United FC	Soccer	Major League Soccer	Western Conference	Allianz Field	2017
Minnesota Wind Chill	Ultimate Frisbee	Ultimate Frisbee Association	Central	Sea Foam Stadium	2013
G2 Minnesota	Esports	Call of Duty League	Unconferenced	Minneapolis Armory	2019

All teams currently play their home games in Minneapolis except United, the Wild, the Frost, and the Wind Chill. United, the Wild, and the Frost play home games exclusively in St. Paul; the Wind Chill splits its home schedule between Blaine and St. Paul. St. Paul also is home to the St. Paul Saints, a minor-league baseball team.

== Active women's sports teams in Minnesota ==
Founding member of the league

Team	Sport	League	Venue	Year founded
Minnesota Lynx	Basketball	WNBA (Western Conference)	Target Center	1999
Minnesota Vixen	Football	WFA	Klas Field, Hamline University	1999
Minnesota Minx	Football	AWFL	Spring Lake Park High School	2022
Minnesota Frost	Ice hockey	Professional Women's Hockey League	Grand Casino Arena	2023
North Star Roller Derby	Roller derby	Women's Flat Track Derby Association	Lee & Rose Warner Coliseum	2006
Minnesota Roller Derby	Roller derby	Women's Flat Track Derby Association	Roy Wilkins Auditorium	2004
Minnesota Strike	Ultimate	Premier Ultimate League	Sea Foam Stadium	2020, started play in 2022
Minnesota Aurora FC	Soccer	USL W League	TCO Stadium	2022
Twin Cities Gemini	Rugby	Women's Elite Rugby	TCO Stadium	2025
Minnesota Forge	Volleyball	Major League Volleyball (2026)	Grand Casino Arena	2026
LOVB Minnesota	Volleyball	League One Volleyball	TBD	2026

== Former professional sports teams in Minnesota ==
Founding member of the league

Team	Sport	League	Venue	Year founded	Dissolved/moved
Minneapolis Lakers	Basketball	National Basketball Association	Minneapolis Auditorium	1947	1960 (moved to Los Angeles)
Minnesota Muskies	Basketball	American Basketball Association	Met Center	1967	1968 (Moved to Miami)
Minnesota Arctic Blast	Roller hockey	Roller Hockey International	Target Center	1994	1996
Minnesota Monarchs	Volleyball	Major League Volleyball (1987)	Si Melby Hall, Augsburg College and Williams Arena	1987	1989
Minnesota Strikers	Soccer	Major Indoor Soccer League	Met Center	1984	1988 (Moved to Fort Lauderdale)
Minnesota North Stars	Ice hockey	National Hockey League	Met Center	1967	1993 (moved to Dallas)
Minnesota Arctic Blast	Roller hockey	Roller Hockey International	Target Center	1994	1996
Minnesota Fighting Pike	Arena football	Arena Football League	Target Center	1996	1996
Minnesota Thunder	Soccer	USL First Division	National Sports Center	1999	2009
Minnesota Lightning	Soccer	USL W-League	National Sports Center	2006	2009
Minnesota Machine	Football	WFA	Osseo High School	2008	2017
Minnesota Whitecaps	Ice hockey	National Women's Hockey League	TRIA Rink	2004	2023
Minnesota Swarm	Box lacrosse	National Lacrosse League	Xcel Energy Center	2004	2015 (moved to Georgia)
