= Kathryn Treder =

American rugby union player

- Born: Kathryn Treder; March 17, 1996 (age 30) Anchorage, Alaska
- Height: 5 ft 6 in (168 cm)
- Weight: 154 lb (70 kg)
- School: Stanford University
- Occupation: Data scientist

Rugby union career
- Position(s): Hooker, Flanker
Senior career
Years	Team	Apps	(Points)
2022–2023	DMP Sharks	-	(5)
2023–2026	Loughborough Lightning	43	(120)
2025–	Bay Breakers	2	(0)
International career
Years	Team	Apps	(Points)
2019–	United States	39	(10)

Kathryn Treder (born March 17, 1996) is an American rugby union player. She has been a hooker and flanker for the United States national women's rugby union team since 2019 and represented the United States in the 2021 Rugby World Cup in New Zealand. She has also played professionally with the Darlington Mowden Park Sharks and the Loughborough Lightning in the Premiership Women's Rugby league, and will play for the Bay Breakers in the inaugural season of the Women's Elite Rugby competition in 2025.

== Rugby career ==
After playing for the Stanford University club team for four years and serving as the captain, Treder played for the Beantown women's side in the Women's Premier League. The team placed second in the league. In her first season, she was selected for the WPL's all-star match and in 2019, was selected for the U.S national fifteens team. She made her first appearance in November 19 at the CanAm series in San Diego, California.

She made her first World Cup appearance with the United States in 2021. Up until 2022, Treder continued to play for Beantown and served as an assistant coach for the women's rugby team at Wellesley College. In 2022, she was named as one of the 15 leaders under 30 in women's rugby by the U.S. Women's Rugby Foundation.

She played for the Darlington Mowden Park Sharks in the 2022–2023 season of the Premiership Women's Rugby (PWR) competition, then switched to the Loughborough Lightning for the 2023-2024 PWR season.

On February 18, 2025, she was named in the Bay Breakers squad for their inaugural season of the Women's Elite Rugby competition. She played in the test match against Japan in Los Angeles on April 26, the Eagles lost the closely contested game 33–39. On July 17, she was named in the Eagles squad for the Women's Rugby World Cup.

== Biography and personal life ==
Treder was born on March 17, 1996, in Anchorage, Alaska to Luanna Greybear and Tadeusz Treder. She is the second oldest of ten children and grew up helping to take care of her younger siblings. Treder is of Inupiaq and Aleut descent.

She attended Anchorage West High School, where she competed in the long jump and triple jump for the track team and the boys wrestling team. After graduating in 2014, she went on to study political science and comparative studies in race and ethnicity at Stanford University.

After graduating from Stanford, Treder moved to Boston to do research in the political science department at Massachusetts Institute of Technology.

She became engaged to fellow rugby player Alev Kelter at the 2024 Summer Olympics in Paris.
