= Paige Stathopoulos =

US international rugby union player

- Born: 23 August 1993 (age 33) Hanover, Massachusetts, US
- Height: 171 cm (5 ft 7 in)

Rugby union career
- Position: Hooker
Senior career
Years	Team	Apps	(Points)
- Beantown RFC
2024–2025	Trailfinders		
2025–	Boston Banshees		
International career
Years	Team	Apps	(Points)
2023–	United States	21	(10)
National sevens team
Years	Team		Comps
- United States 7s

Paige Stathopoulos (born 23 August 1993) is an American rugby union player. She plays for the Boston Banshees in the Women's Elite Rugby competition. She competed for the United States in the 2025 Women's Rugby World Cup.

== Rugby career ==
Stathopoulos made her international debut for the United States against Wales in September 2023. She has played for the United States sevens team.

She played for Beantown RFC in 2024. By the end of summer 2024, she had accumulated ten caps for the United States team when she was selected for the WXV 1 tournament in Canada.

At the end of 2024, she travelled to England and joined Ealing Trailfinders for the 2024–25 Premiership Women's Rugby season on a short-term contract.

In 2025, she signed with the Boston Banshees for the inaugural 2025 Women's Elite Rugby season. She was named in the Eagles squad for the 2025 Women's Rugby World Cup in England.
