= Boston Banshees =

Women's Rugby union club in Massachusetts

- Founded: January 2025; 1 year ago
- Location: Boston, Massachusetts
- Ground(s): Veterans Memorial Stadium; Centreville Bank Stadium (Capacity: 5,000; 10,500-11,000)
- Coach: Kittery Wagner-Ruiz
- Captain: TBA
- League: Women's Elite Rugby
- 2025: 4th

Official website
- www.bostonbanshees.us

The Boston Banshees are an American semi-professional women's rugby union team based in Boston, Massachusetts. The team was founded in 2025 and is scheduled to play in the inaugural Women's Elite Rugby season.

== History ==
The Boston Banshees team crest features a Banshee from Irish folklore whose "shriek signals impending doom." Because of New England's links to witches/folklore and also due to a strong Irish presence in the region, the Banshee was seen as a "seamless fit for the city." The team also chose to use the colors of Moonlight White,Ghostly Gray, Blood-Moon Red and Midnight for their crest.

Kittery Wagner-Ruiz who represented the United States at the 2010 and 2014 Rugby World Cup's was named as the team's first Head Coach. Cassidy Bargell, Yejadai Dunn, Emily Henrich, Akweley Okine, and Paige Stathopoulos were named as the teams foundational five members.

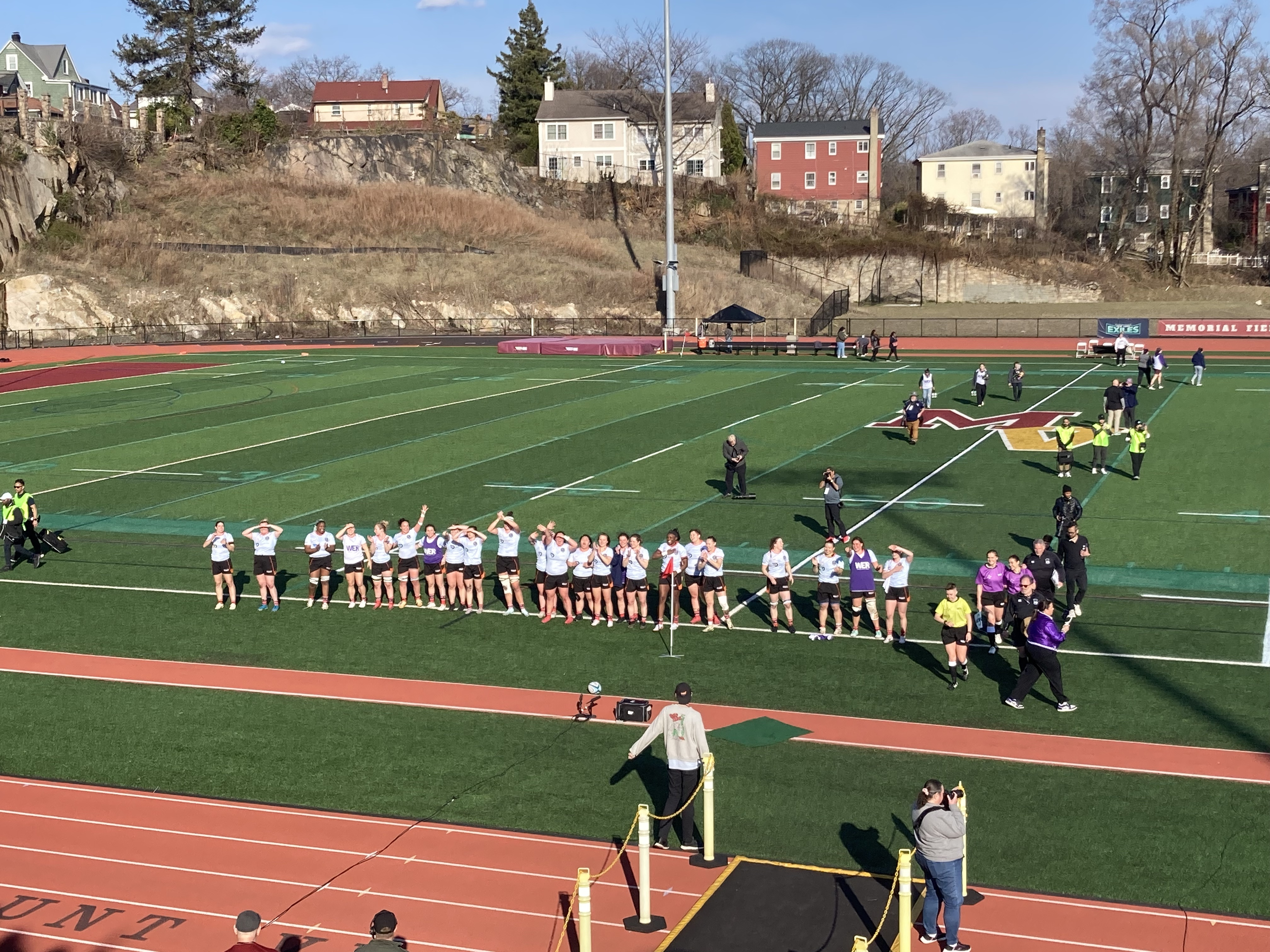
Boston Banshees after winning against New York Exiles in March 2025.

The Banshees will start the season at the Veterans Memorial Stadium in Quincy, Massachusetts and then play their final three matches at Centreville Bank Stadium in Pawtucket, Rhode Island.

== Players ==
=== Current squad ===
The Boston Banshees squad for the 2026 Women's Elite Rugby season is:

Note: Flags indicate national union under World Rugby eligibility rules. Players may hold more than one non-World Rugby nationality.

Player	Position	Union
Asialeata Meni	Hooker	United States
Delaney Dill	Hooker	United States
Lauren Ferridge	Hooker	United States
Akweley Okine	Prop	United States
Ang Owen	Prop	United States
Caitlin Weigel	Prop	United States
**Megan Rom**	Prop	United States
**Catie Benson**	Prop	United States
Emma Wright	Prop	United States
Lauryn Carlton	Prop	United States
Nickky Nguygen	Prop	United States
Oliver Wright	Prop	United States
**Jenny Kronish**	Lock	United States
Aziza Alford	Lock	United States
Cassie Depner	Lock	United States
Eliza Altobelli	Lock	United States
Malia Isaacs	Lock	United States
Gen Quirion	Back row	Canada
Kaitlyn Sosa	Back row	New Zealand
Kate Boggs	Back row	United States
Molly McAlevey	Back row	United States

Player	Position	Union
Yeja Dunn	Back row	United States
Lauren Kuffel	Back row	United States
Salma Bezzat	Back row	United States
Shelby Vance	Back row	United States
Ki Mahony	Scrum-half	Canada
Natalie Armatage	Scrum-half	Canada
PK Vincze	Fly-half	United States
Amanda Wild	Centre	United States
Desiree Leaupepe	Centre	United States
Jenni Laferriere	Centre	United States
Morgan Walker	Centre	Canada
Nicolette Pantor	Centre	(Trinidad and Tobago) Trinidad and Tobago
Keisha Durden	Wing	United States
Emily Becker	Wing	United States
Emma Santosuosso	Wing	United States
Erin Wholey	Wing	United States
Kirsty Venter	Fullback	
Morgan Cunningham	Fullback	United States

- Senior 15s internationally capped players are listed in **bold**.
