= Alev Kelter =

American rugby union player (born 1991)

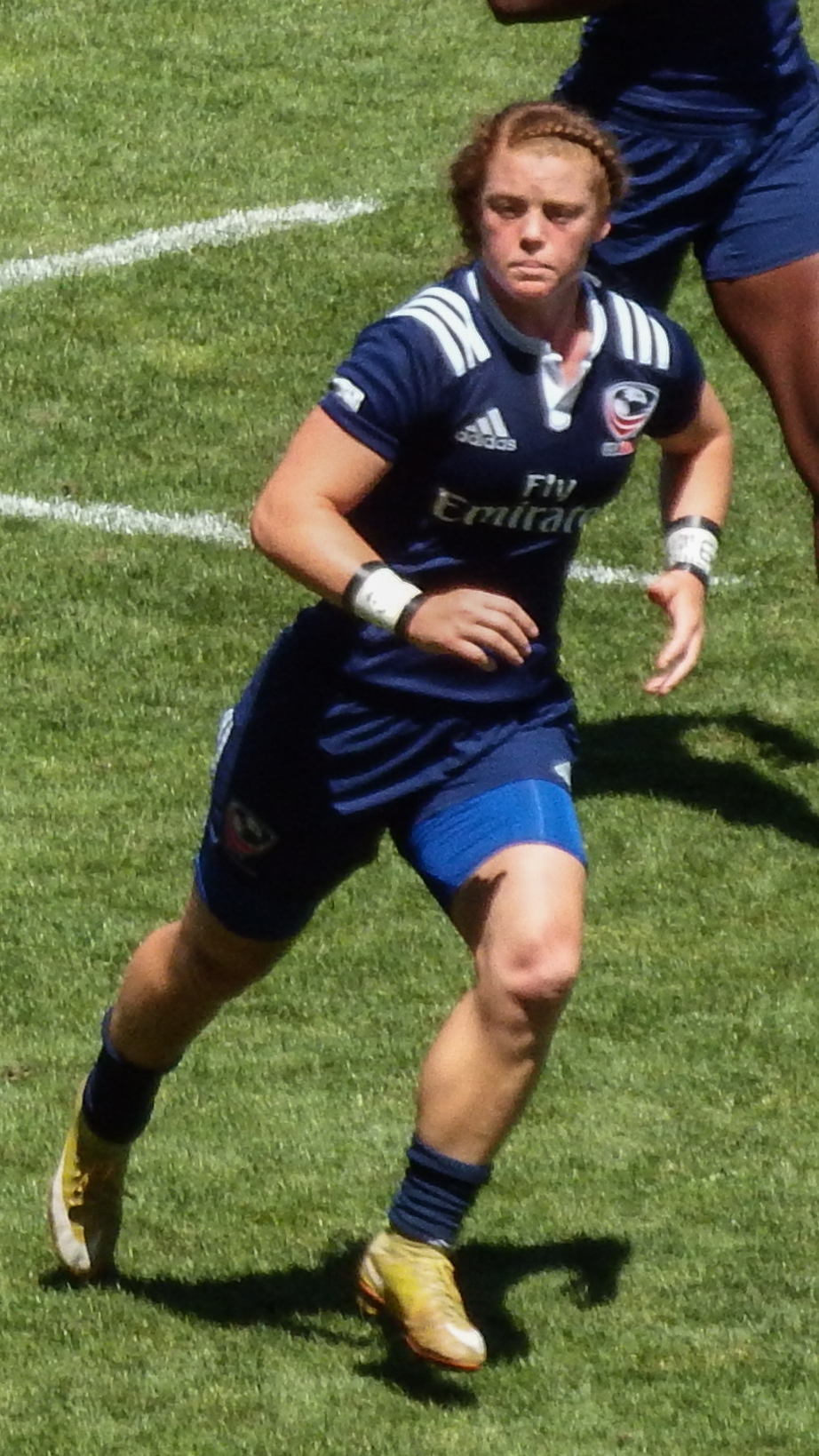
- Kelter during 2017 match between women's rugby sevens teams for U.S. and Ireland
- Born: Leyla Alev Kelter; March 21, 1991 (age 35) Tampa, Florida, U.S.
- Height: 5 ft 6 in (168 cm)
- Weight: 165 lb (75 kg)

Rugby union career
- Position: Centre
Senior career
Years	Team	Apps	(Points)
2022–2023	Saracens Women		(0)
2023–2025	Loughborough Lightning		(7)
2025–	Bay Breakers	1	(0)
International career
Years	Team	Apps	(Points)
2016–	United States	33	(106)
National sevens team
Years	Team		Comps
2014–	United States		
Medal record
Women's rugby sevens
Representing United States
Olympic Games
Bronze medal – third place	2024 Paris	Team competition
Pan American Games
Silver medal – second place	2015 Toronto	Team competition
Association football career
- Position: Midfielder
College career
Years	Team	Apps	(Gls)
2009–2013	Wisconsin Badgers		
International career
2009	United States U20		
Ice hockey career
- Position: Defense
- Shot: Right
- Played for: Wisconsin Badgers
- National team: United States
- Playing career: 2009–2013

Leyla Alev Kelter (/ˈleɪlə əˈlɛv ˈkɛltər/ LAY-lə ə-LEV KEL-tər; born March 21, 1991) is an American rugby sevens and rugby union player. She competed for the United States at the 2016, 2020 and 2024 Summer Olympics. She also represented the United States at the 2017 and 2021 Rugby World Cups.

== Rugby career ==
She won a silver medal at the 2015 Pan American Games as a member of the United States women's national rugby sevens team. She also made the squad at the 2016 Summer Olympics in Brazil.

Kelter was named in the Eagles squad to the 2017 Women's Rugby World Cup in Ireland.

In January 2022 the English rugby side Saracens Women announced that they had signed her for the rest of the 2021–22 Premier 15s season. She was named in the Eagles squad for the 2022 Pacific Four Series in New Zealand. She was selected in the Eagles squad for the 2021 Rugby World Cup in New Zealand.

She has also played for the Northern Loonies in Premier Rugby Sevens, and was part of the 2021 Inaugural Championship team and the 2023 Women's Championship. She won the Finals MVP in 2023. She signed with English club, Loughborough Lightning, for the 2024–25 Premiership Women's Rugby season.

Kelter won a bronze medal in rugby sevens at the 2024 Summer Olympics.

On February 18, 2025, it was announced that the Bay Breakers had signed her for the inaugural season of the Women's Elite Rugby competition. She scored a try in the closely contested test against Japan in Los Angeles on April 26, 2025, the Eagles lost the game 33–39.

On May 17, 2025, in the United States' match against Australia in the 2025 Pacific Four Series, Kelter received a red card in the 79th minute for an illegal act on the field. Whilst being tackled by Australian player Georgina Friedrichs, Kelter stamped several times on her head. Kelter was given a straight red card by referee Aimee Barrett-Theron, who described her actions as "thuggery". Former Australia men's centre Morgan Turinui said her actions were "disgusting". Kelter received a three-match sanction from World Rugby, which was reduced from six matches, with World Rugby's Independent Disciplinary Committee stating: "Taking all considerations into account, including the player’s disciplinary record, early acknowledgment of foul play and her clear remorse, the Disciplinary Committee determined that full mitigation was appropriate, resulting in a final sanction of three matches."

She was selected in the Eagles side on July 17 to the 2025 Women's Rugby World Cup that was held in England.

== Soccer and Ice hockey ==
Kelter played for the United States women's national under-16 soccer team and the United States women's national under-18 ice hockey team and later played both sports at the University of Wisconsin from 2009 to 2013.

In 2014, she almost made her Olympic debut at the Winter Games but was one of the last cut for that team.

== Personal life ==
Born to Mark Perusse and Leyla Kelter, she has two brothers, Erol and Aydin and a twin sister, Derya, who also played soccer and ice hockey. Before she was nine, her family had moved four times because her parents were in the military. Kelter was raised in Alaska and was the first woman to play boys' varsity high school ice hockey. She also played for the U23 USA soccer team and U18 USA ice hockey team. Kelter attended Chugiak High School in Chugiak, Alaska. She graduated with a degree in Fine Arts from University of Wisconsin in 2015.

At the 2024 Paris Olympics, Kelter got engaged to her partner, fellow rugby player Kathryn Treder.
