= Tahlia Brody =

American rugby union player (born 1994)

- Born: September 10, 1994 (age 32)
- Height: 1.71 m (5 ft 7 in)
- Weight: 76 kg (168 lb)

Rugby union career
- Position: Loose forward
Amateur team(s)
Years	Team	Apps	(Points)
	Marist		(0)
Senior career
Years	Team	Apps	(Points)
2023–2025	Leicester Tigers		(0)
2025–	Denver Onyx	1	(1)
2025–	Loughborough Lightning		
Provincial / State sides
Years	Team	Apps	(Points)
2019	Bay of Plenty Volcanix		(0)
2022	Tasman Makos	4	(5)
International career
Years	Team	Apps	(Points)
2023–	United States	24	(5)

Tahlia Brody (born September 10, 1994) is an American rugby union player. She competes for the United States internationally. She played for the Leicester Tigers in the Premiership Women's Rugby.

== Rugby career ==
Brody debuted for the Bay of Plenty Volcanix in the 2019 Farah Palmer Cup season, her side lost to the Auckland Storm 28–19. She has also played for the Tasman Makos in the Farah Palmer Cup and for the Cheltenham Tigers in England.

She won the U.S. Women's Premier League title with the New York Rugby Club in 2017, and with the Berkeley All Blues in 2022.

Brody was named in the Eagles traveling squad for their test against Spain, and for the 2023 Pacific Four Series. She debuted for the Eagles in their 20–14 win against Spain in Madrid.

At the end of 2024, she received a three-match ban following a red card in the Premiership Women's Rugby, she was sent off in her sides defeat to Saracens in Round 9 of the 2024–2025 season for a dangerous tackle.

In 2025, she joined the Denver Onyx squad for the inaugural season of the Women's Elite Rugby competition. Later that year, she started in the Eagles test against Japan in Los Angeles on April 26.

In June 2025 it was announced her departure from Leicester Tigers to join Loughborough Lightning. On July 17, she was selected for the Eagles side to the 2025 Women's Rugby World Cup that will be held in England.
