= 2025 Women's Elite Rugby season =

Season in American women's rugby union

2025 Women's Elite Rugby
- Countries: United States
- Number of teams: 6
- Date: March 22 – June 14, 2025
- Champions: Denver Onyx (1st title)
- Runners-up: New York Exiles
- Matches played: 31

Official website
- www.womenseliterugby.us

The 2025 Women's Elite Rugby season was the first season of the Women's Elite Rugby (WER) league based in the United States.

The regular season ran from March 22 to June 14, with each of the six teams competing in 10 games each. After 13 rounds of competition, the season concluded with the top two ranked teams playing in the grand final for the Legacy Cup on June 29 at the TCO Stadium in Eagan, Minnesota.

The Denver Onyx beat the New York Exiles to win the Legacy Cup.

== Teams and locations ==
The 2025 edition of Women's Elite Rugby was contested by six teams spread around the United States.

Locations of teams in the United States competing in the 2025 season.
1 Bay Breakers
2 Boston Banshees
3 Chicago Tempest
4 Denver Onyx
5 New York Exiles
6 Twin Cities Gemini

Team	Head coach	Captain	Stadium
Bay Breakers	Hannah Stolba		Grape Bowl
Boston Banshees	Kittery Wagner-Ruiz		Veterans Memorial Stadium (Note: Three matches will be played at the Centreville Bank Stadium in Pawtucket, Rhode Island.)
Chicago Tempest	Bryan Colbridge		Martin Stadium
Denver Onyx	Sarah Chobot		Infinity Park
New York Exiles	Diego Maquieira		The Stadium at Memorial Field
Twin Cities Gemini	Sylvia Braaten		TCO Stadium

== Regular season ==
=== Standings ===
Team	GP	W	D	L	Road Wins	BP	Points	Qualification
Denver Onyx	10	9	0	1	4	10	46	Advance to Grand Final
New York Exiles	10	6	0	4	3	9	33	Advance to Grand Final
Bay Breakers	10	6	0	4	3	8	32	
Boston Banshees	10	6	0	4	4	6	30	
TC Gemini	10	3	0	7	1	5	17	
Chicago Tempest	10	0	0	10	0	2	2	

=== Matches ===
Home \ Away	BRE	BOS	CHI	DEN	NY	TC
Bay Breakers	—	28–49	45–21	17–40	38–26	66–12
Boston Banshees	22–31	—	49–12	7–25	20–24	36–10
Chicago Tempest	17–51	12–65	—	0–41	17–48	15–20
Denver Onyx	63–7	53–21	76–7	—	62–7	75–14
New York Exiles	19–39	27–29	43–14	24–17	—	31–22
Twin Cities Gemini	17–12	12–15	12–10	19–38	28–34	—

Updated to match(es) played on unknown. Source: Women's Elite Rugby
Legend: Blue = home team win; Yellow = draw; Red = away team win.

=== Scheduled matches ===
==== Week 1 (March 22–23) ====
March 22
15:00 EDT (UTC−4)

New York Exiles	27–29	Boston Banshees
Try: Green-Yotts; Feury; O'Sullivan Roche; Castillo; Con: Owens (2/4)		Try: Ferridge; Kronish; Dunn; Emba

The Stadium at Memorial Field
Referee: Lindsey Oliver

March 23
13:00 CDT (UTC−5)

Chicago Tempest	15–20	Twin Cities Gemini
Try: Buzby; Bailous (2)		Try: Hampton (3); Jacobs

Martin Stadium
Referee: Katie Roth

Bye/s: Bay Breakers & Denver Onyx

==== Week 2 (March 29–30) ====
March 29
19:00 EDT (UTC−4)

Boston Banshees	36–10	Twin Cities Gemini
Try: Dunn (3); Vance; Emba; Kronish; Con: Emba (2/6)		Try: Clawson; Leatherman

Veterans Memorial Stadium
Referee: Juan Pablo Parra

March 29
13:00 MDT (UTC−6)

Denver Onyx	63–7	Bay Breakers
Try: Coulibaly (2); Johnson; Taufo'ou; Learned; Bailey; Brody; Bitter; Long; Con: Hawkins (8/8); Bitter (1/1)		Try: Lin; Con: Kelter (1/1)

Infinity Park
Referee: Katie Roth

March 30
13:00 CDT (UTC−5)

Chicago Tempest	17–48	New York Exiles
Try: Alejandro (2); Walklate		Try: Cheeks (2); Frick; Kocaj (2); Cruz; Hunkin-Clark; Con: Owens (5/7)

Martin Stadium
Referee: Lindsey Oliver

==== Week 3 (April 5–6) ====
April 5
13:00 MDT (UTC−6)

Denver Onyx	62–7	New York Exiles
Try: Hamdan (2); Coulibaly (2); Bailey (2); Taufo'ou; Coffey; Decker; Feasby; Con: Hawkins 6/10		Try: Cheeks; Con: Owens (1/1)

Infinity Park
Referee: Morris Fuller

April 5
17:30 PDT (UTC−7)

Bay Breakers	66–12	Twin Cities Gemini
Try: Tupou; Wessman; Burgos; McGrath; Mataitoga (4); Vogel; Okpara; Con: Kelter (3); Clark (5)		Try: Nunes; Hampton; Con: Curtis (1)

Grape Bowl Stadium
Referee: Mike Lawrenson

April 6
12:00 CDT (UTC−5)

Chicago Tempest	12–65	Boston Banshees
Try: Fisch; Walklate; Con: Fisch (1)		Try: Weigel; Ferridge (2); Dunn (1); Santosuosso; Heinrich (3); Cowdrey (2); Harkavy; Con: Cowdrey (4); Harkavy (1)

Martin Stadium
Referee: Sybil Levine

==== Week 4 (April 12–13) ====
April 12
13:00 MDT (UTC−6)

Denver Onyx	76–7	Chicago Tempest
Try: Solomon (2); Taufo'ou; Brody (3); Johnson; Bender-Cruz; Feasby; Tordonato; Beard; Ehrecke; Con: Bitter (6); Perl (2)		Try: Alejandro; Con: Fisch (1)

Infinity Park
Referee: Lindsey Oliver

April 13
14:00 EDT (UTC−4)

New York Exiles	19–39	Bay Breakers
Try: Correia; Ruiz; Pennino; Con: Owens (2/3)		Try: Tupou; Cooper; Burgos; McGrath; Hart; Namosimalua; Pen: 1

The Stadium at Memorial Field
Referee: Tara Roberts

Bye/s: Boston Banshees & Twin Cities Gemini

==== Week 5 (April 19) ====
April 19
14:00 EDT (UTC−4)

Boston Banshees	20–24	New York Exiles
Try: Vance; Dunn; Cowdrey; Con: Schweitzer (1)		Try: Hunkin-Clark; DeBruzzi; Frick; Green-Yotts; Con: Owens (2)

Veterans Memorial Stadium

Bye/s: Bay Breakers, Chicago Tempest, Denver Onyx & Twin Cities Gemini

==== Week 6 (April 25–26) ====
April 25
19:00 CDT (UTC−5)

Twin Cities Gemini	17–12	Bay Breakers
Try: Liu; Clawson; Bauer; Con: Mior (1)		Try: Tupou; Lin; Con: Bernadel-Huey (1)

TCO Stadium

April 26
14:00 CDT (UTC−5)

Chicago Tempest	0–41	Denver Onyx
		Try: Decker; Perl; Tordonato; Slaughter (2); Waters (2); Con: Perl (3)

Martin Stadium

Bye/s: Boston Banshees & New York Exiles

==== Week 7 (May 3–4) ====
May 3
15:00 CDT (UTC−5)

Chicago Tempest	17–51	Bay Breakers
Try: Andrade; Reiter; Alejandro; Con: Farnan (1)		Try: Edwards; Liulamaga; Watkins; Namosimalua; Carillo; Hart; Tupou; Tong; Siano; Con: Bernadel-Huey (3)

Martin Stadium

May 3
19:00 CDT (UTC−5)

Twin Cities Gemini	28–34	New York Exiles
Try: Mior; Clawson; Black-Keels; Curtis; Con: Mior (1/1); Bauer (3/3)		Try: A'au; Green-Yotts; Pennino; Frick; Correia; Blair; Con: Owens (2)

TCO Stadium

May 4
16:00 EDT (UTC−4)

Boston Banshees	7–25	Denver Onyx
Try: Laferriere; Con: Schweitzer (1/1)		Try: Solomon; Coffey; Lally; Slaughter; Wilfley

Centreville Bank Stadium

==== Week 8 (May 9–10) ====
May 9
19:00 CDT (UTC−5)

Twin Cities Gemini	19–38	Denver Onyx
Try: Doerscher; Johnson; Leatherman; Con: Bauer (2)		Try: Feasby (2); Hann; Slaughter (2); Wilfley; Con: Perl (3); Bender-Cruz (1)

TCO Stadium

May 10
14:00 PDT (UTC−7)

Bay Breakers	28–49	Boston Banshees
Try: Jurkowski; McGrath; Carrillo; Siano; Con: Ramos (1/1); Bernadel-Huey (3/3)		Try: Ferridge; Kronish (2); Armatage; Savin; Schweitzer; Meni; Con: Schweitzer (6/6); Harkavy (1/1)

Grape Bowl Stadium

==== Week 9 (May 17–18) ====
May 17
14:00 EDT (UTC−4)

Boston Banshees	49–12	Chicago Tempest
Try: Weigel (2); Dunn; Armatage; Lohaus (3); Con: Harkavy (5/5); Schweitzer (1/1); Vincze (1/1)		Try: Bailous; Fisch; Con: Fisch (1)

Tidewater Landing Stadium

May 18
14:00 EDT (UTC−4)

New York Exiles	31–22	Twin Cities Gemini
Try: Minahan; Owens; Cheeks; Blair; Cunningham; Con: Cunningham (1); Owens (2)		Try: Williams; Hampton; Clawson; Bauer; Con: Mior (1)

The Stadium at Memorial Field

Bye/s: Bay Breakers & Denver Onyx

==== Week 10 (May 24–25) ====
May 24
13:00 MDT (UTC−6)

Denver Onyx	53–21	Boston Banshees
Try: Hall; Hamdan; Feasby; Coffey; Lally; Coulibaly (4); Con: Perl (4)		Try: Weigel; Dunn (2); Con: Harkavy (3/3)

Infinity Park

May 25
14:00 PDT (UTC−7)

Bay Breakers	38–26	New York Exiles
Try: Siano; Kilgour; Carrillo (3); Wessman; Con: Clark (2); Siano (2)		Try: O'Sullivan-Roche; Titus; Cheeks (2); Con: Cunningham (3)

Grape Bowl Stadium

==== Week 11 (May 31–June 1) ====
May 31
14:00 EDT (UTC−4)

Boston Banshees	22–31	Bay Breakers
Try: Dunn (2); Carlton; Con: Harkavy (2)		Try: Vogel; Jurkowski; Wessman; Kilgour; McGrath; Con: Ramos (1); Siano (2)

Centreville Bank Stadium

May 31
19:00 CDT (UTC−5)

Twin Cities Gemini	12–10	Chicago Tempest
Try: Johnson (2); Con: Mior (1)		Try: Bailous; Chiappetta

TCO Stadium

June 1
12:00 EDT (UTC−4)

New York Exiles	24–17	Denver Onyx
Try: Pick; Jex; Owens; Cheeks; Con: Owens (2)		Try: Sheveland; Lally; Slaughter; Con: Perl (1)

The Stadium at Memorial Field

==== Week 12 (June 7) ====
June 7
13:00 MDT (UTC−6)

Denver Onyx	75–14	Twin Cities Gemini
Try: Beard; Long; Feasby; Johnson (2); Coffey; Slaughter (2); Fa'avesi; Solomon; Lavigne; Con: Bitter (3); Hawkins (7)		Try: Leatherman; Doerscher; Con: Mior (2/2)

Infinity Park

June 7
14:00 PDT (UTC−7)

Bay Breakers	45–21	Chicago Tempest
Try: Thomas; Kilgour (3); Thacker; Jurkowski; Siano; Con: Siano (1); Ramos (4)		Try: Fisch; Alejandro (2); Con: Bailous (1); Chiappetta (1); Strom (1)

Grape Bowl Stadium

Bye/s: Boston Banshees & New York Exiles

==== Week 13 (May 13–14) ====
June 13
19:00 CDT (UTC−5)

Twin Cities Gemini	12–15	Boston Banshees
Try: Hall; Bauer; Con: Mior (1)	Report	Try: Dunn; Henrich; Cunningham

TCO Stadium

June 14
12:00 EDT (UTC−4)

New York Exiles	43–14	Chicago Tempest
Try: Jex; Green-Yotts; Blair; Frick; Owens (2); Con: Owens (5)	Report	Try: Buzby; Chiappetta; Con: Chiappetta (2/2)

The Stadium at Memorial Field

June 14
14:00 PDT (UTC−7)

Bay Breakers	17–40	Denver Onyx
Try: Kilgour (2); Tupou; Con: Ramos (1)	Report	Try: Johnson (2); Coffey; Solomon; Bailey; Bender-Cruz; Con: Bender-Cruz (1); Bitter (4)

Grape Bowl Stadium

== Grand final (Legacy Cup) ==
June 29
14:00 CDT (UTC−5)

Denver Onyx	53–13	New York Exiles
Try: Taufo'ou; Ehrecke; Bailey; Waters; Hawkins; Fa'avesi (2); Bender-Cruz; Con: Hawkins (5); Pen: Hawkins (1)		Try: Green-Yotts; Con: Owens (1/1); Pen: Cunningham (2)

TCO Stadium
