= Hope Cooper =

US rugby union player

- Born: April 1, 1998 (age 28)

Rugby union career
- Position: Hooker
Senior career
Years	Team	Apps	(Points)
- Berkeley All Blues
2025–	Bay Breakers		

Hope Cooper (born April 1, 1998) is an American rugby union player. She plays Hooker for the Bay Breakers in the Women's Elite Rugby competition.

== Early career ==
Cooper competed in basketball, swimming and volleyball throughout High School. She toured Canada in 2019 as a member of the Collegiate all-American team and in 2022 as a member of the United States Under-23 side.

== Rugby career ==
Cooper played for the Berkeley All Blues in the WPL National Championships. In 2025, she signed with the Bay Breakers for the inaugural season of the Women's Elite Rugby competition.

She was selected in the Eagles squad for the 2025 Women's Rugby World Cup in England. She has yet to make her international debut for the United States.
