= Women's Elite Rugby =

Women's rugby union club competition in the United States

- Current season, competition or edition: 2026 Women's Elite Rugby season
- Sport: Rugby union
- First season: 2025
- No. of teams: 6
- Country: United States
- Most recent champion: Denver Onyx (2026)
- Most titles: Denver Onyx (2)
- Website: womenseliterugby.us

Women's Elite Rugby (WER) is an annual semi-professional women's rugby union club competition at the top level of the United States rugby union system. It is contested by six clubs, owned by the league and operated by investor-operators, who play two round robins for spots in a championship-determining playoff tournament. It began play in the 2025 season, superseding the amateur Women's Premier League (WPL). Its current champions are the Denver Onyx.

The league was founded by WPL executives in 2023, as the final stage of their efforts to professionalise American women's rugby union. A growth in the game was anticipated ahead of an Olympic tournament and World Cup to be hosted in the United States, which the league sought to capitalise upon by offering a professional league to American players that would otherwise take on professional opportunities abroad, such as in England's Premiership Women's Rugby. All front office staff are paid full-time wages.

== History ==
=== Foundation and development ===
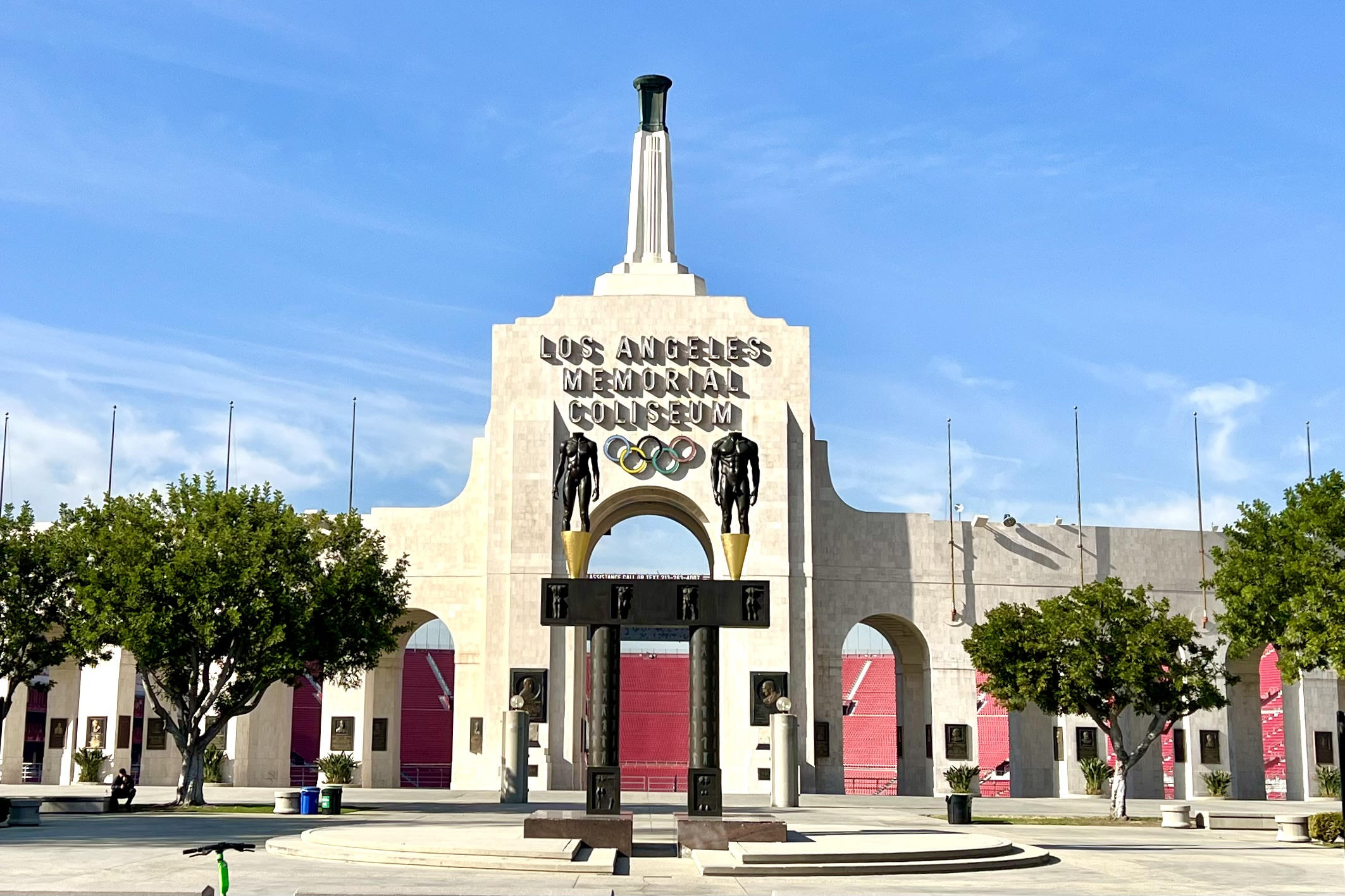
The 2028 Olympics (pictured) and 2033 World Cup, both to be held in the United States, were catalysts in the league's founding.

Having deemed its amateur pay-to-play model as "no longer sustainable", the Women's Premier League (WPL), an iteration of the top-level women's rugby union club competition in the United States founded in 2009, embarked on its "Ignite the Change" campaign in 2022 that sought to professionalize women's rugby union in the United States. The campaign led to a board of directors being formed in mid-2023 to establish a for-profit professional league, to capitalize on the perceived rise of professional women's sports, and both the 2028 Olympic rugby sevens tournament and 2033 Women's Rugby World Cup to be hosted in the United States. A retention of American players and an expansion of rugby union's reach into the American sports market were also touted as goals for the new league; twelve of the United States national team's 2024 Pacific Four Series squad played in England's semi-professional Premiership Women's Rugby instead of an American league.

The league was publicly unveiled as "Women's Elite Rugby" in an April 2024 press conference, announcing that its inaugural season will be played the following year, and that it'll seek to be profitable by its third season. A pre-seed funding round that same month raised $500,000 for the league through SAFEs with the venture capital firm Chasing Rainbows, and former Procter & Gamble executive Deb Henretta, along with other unnamed family offices and private equity firms. In May, the league embarked on a seed round that lasted until March 2025, which aimed to raise $3 million, and are planning a series A round in mid-2025. Amid this, the national rugby sevens team's surprise bronze medal win at the 2024 Olympic tournament sparked a surge in player registrations for USA Rugby-sanctioned women's clubs – dubbed the "Ilona Maher effect" – which the league's marketing campaign sought to benefit from, despite Maher playing for the Bristol Bears. During an open call in September to October, the league received applications from 385 players expressing interest in signing for a WER team.

=== First seasons (2025–present) ===
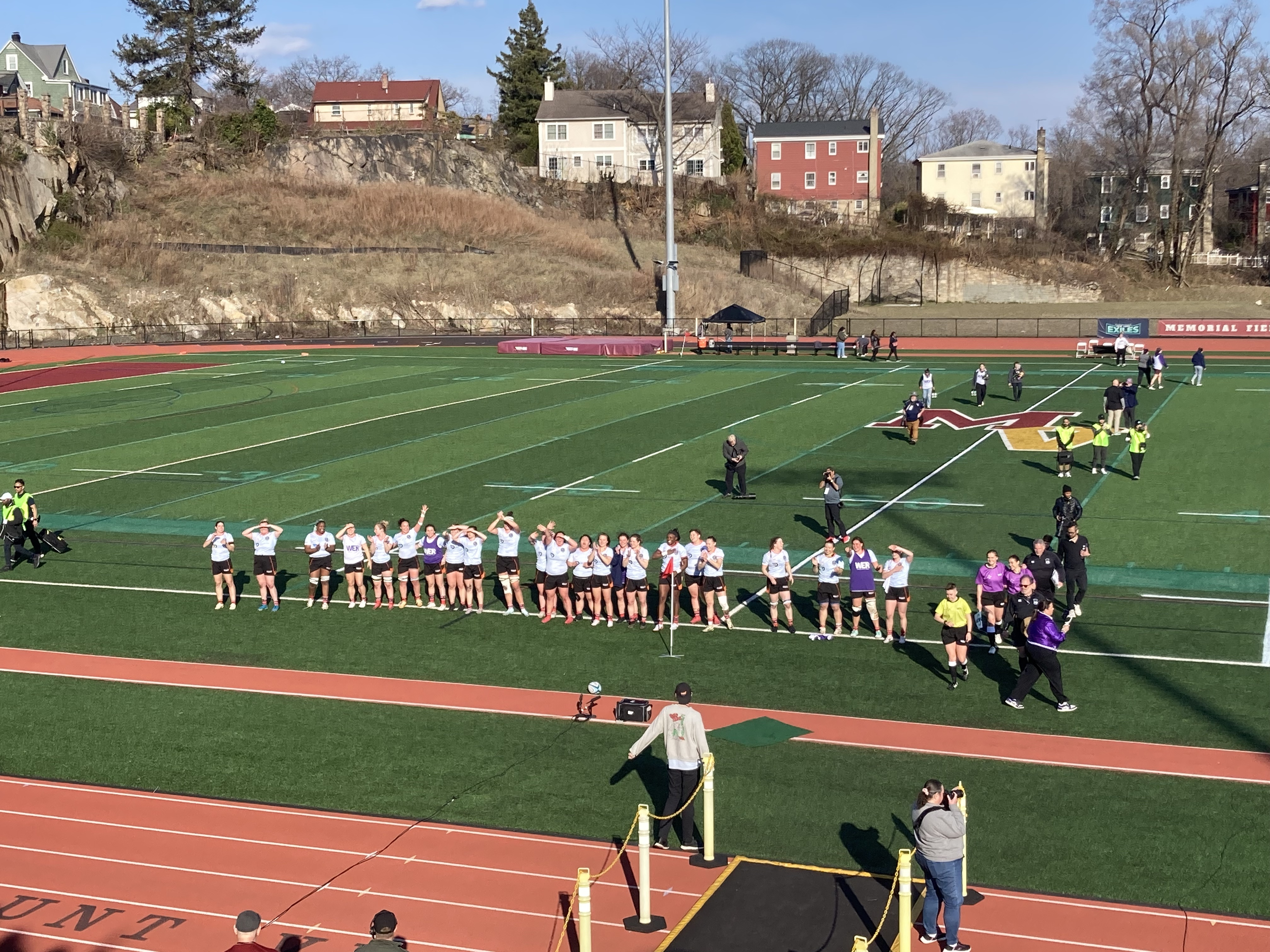
The Banshees celebrate their victory in the inaugural game, held at The Stadium at Memorial Field.

In the months leading up to the start of their inaugural season in March 2025, the league promoted its launch with publicized unveilings of each team's brandings, co-designed by the league and British advertising agency MATTA; head coaches; and first five signings, referred to as the teams' "Foundational Five". They included Rachel Ehrecke, McKenzie Hawkins, and Maya Learned, who all signed for the Denver Onyx. The first ever WER match was played on March 21 at The Stadium at Memorial Field in Mount Vernon, New York – a New York Exiles home game loss to the Boston Banshees, during which Misha Green-Yotts scored the league's first try.

== Organization ==
Women's Elite Rugby's president is former national rugby sevens team player Jessica Hammond-Graf, and its vice president is Department of Justice legal historian and information specialist Katherine Aversano, while former Dallas Jackals general manager Phil Camm is its executive adviser. Stacy Carone, Koma Gandy, Jenny Houlihan, and Hallie Martin also sit on the league's board of directors alongside Hammond-Graf and Aversano. The league and its teams' front office staff will be paid on a full-time basis.

== Format ==
In Women's Elite Rugby's regular season, consisting thirty games in total played from March to June, each team plays a double round robin to earn spots in a playoff tournament that determines the league's champion. The format of the playoffs are yet to be finalised.

== Teams ==
Women's Elite Rugby's six charter franchises – the Bay Breakers, Boston Banshees, Chicago Tempest, Denver Onyx, New York Exiles, and Twin Cities Gemini – are based in the locations of the seven clubs in the preceding WPL, chosen for their "unique, storied history with the sport of rugby." An expansion to eight teams or more within its first ten seasons is planned. Each team is run by investor-operators with shares in the WER itself, with the league itself retaining a degree of control over the recruitment of players and personnel. Up to thirty players can be signed to a team, with each player compensated with monthly stipends throughout the season. While players benefit from travel cost and accident insurance coverage, the exact amount of pay players receive has not been publicly disclosed by the league.

2026 Women's Elite Rugby teams
Team	Location	Venue(s)	Joined
Bay Breakers	Lodi, California	Heart Health Park	2025
Boston Banshees	Quincy, Massachusetts	Veterans Memorial Stadium (Note: Three matches of the 2025 season were played at the Tidewater Landing Stadium in Pawtucket, Rhode Island.)	2025
Chicago Tempest	Evanston, Illinois	Northwestern Medicine Field	2025
Denver Onyx	Glendale, Colorado	Infinity Park	2025
New York Exiles	Mount Vernon, New York	The Stadium at Memorial Field	2025
Twin Cities Gemini	Eagan, Minnesota	TCO Stadium	2025

== Broadcasting ==
Women's Elite Rugby's 2025 season was livestreamed worldwide by the streaming service DAZN, who provide WER matches as one of its free-to-watch offerings. The global broadcasting deal with DAZN was made to "create an entertaining rugby product for Americans", according to Hammond-Graf, while gaining exposure for the league among rugby fans outside of the franchise markets, and among women's sports fans in general. The value of the deal was not publicly disclosed.

== See also ==
- Professional sports leagues in the United States
- Prominent women's sports leagues in the United States and Canada
