= Hallie Taufo'ou =

American rugby union player

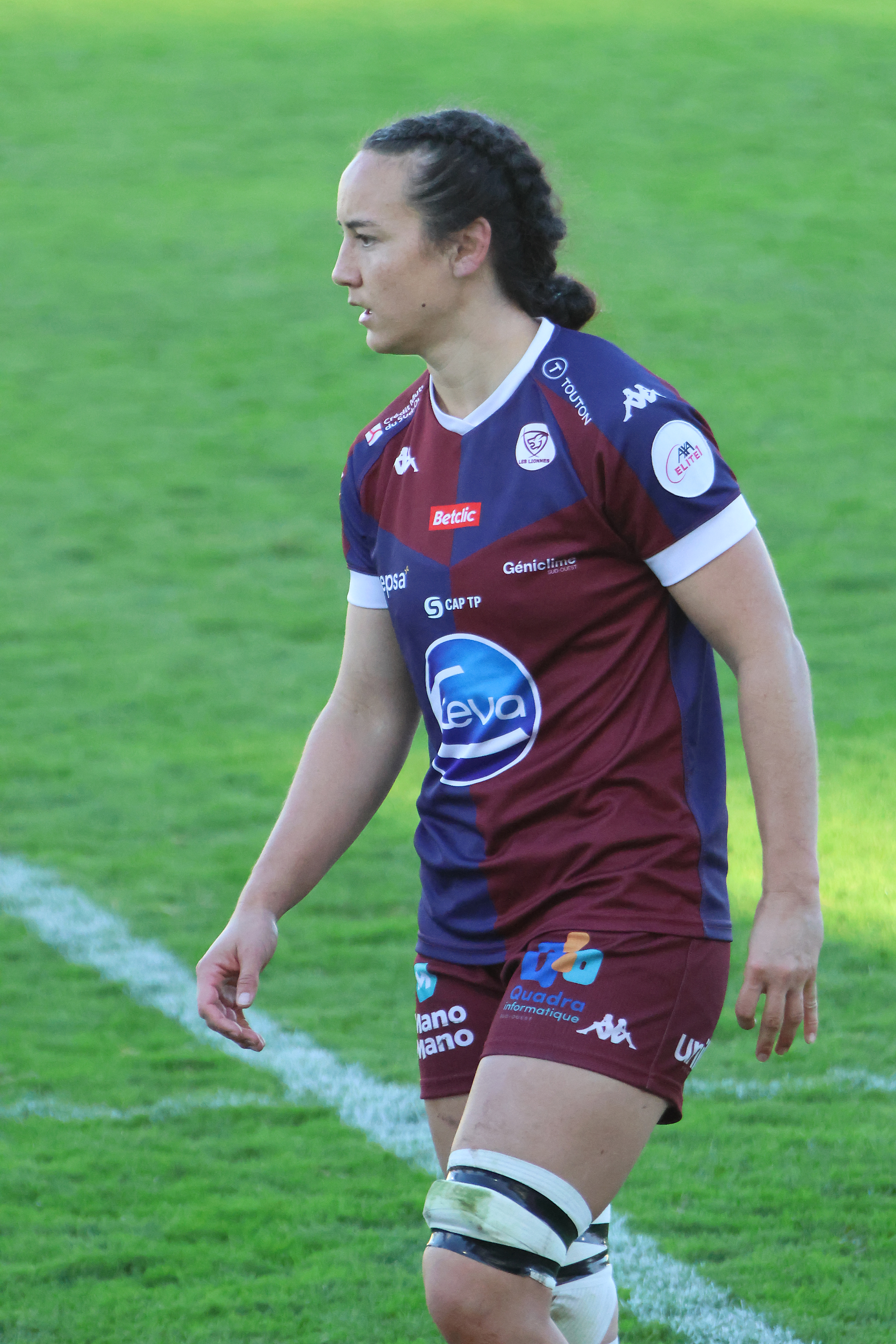
- Born: May 26, 1994 (age 32) Meridian, Idaho, USA
- Height: 5 ft 10 in (178 cm)
- Weight: 165 lb (75 kg)

Rugby union career
- Position: Lock
Senior career
Years	Team	Apps	(Points)
2022–2025	Loughborough Lightning	36	(20)
2025–	Denver Onyx	1	(1)
International career
Years	Team	Apps	(Points)
2021–	United States	30	(20)

Hallie Taufo'ou (born May 26, 1994) is an American rugby union player. She plays for the United States internationally and recently joined the Denver Onyx for the inaugural season of Women's Elite Rugby. She previously played for Loughborough Lightning in the Premier 15s.

== Early career and life ==
Taufo'ou is of Tongan descent and is from Meridian, Idaho. She grew up playing soccer and basketball. She graduated from Utah State University with a degree in business administration in 2018.

== Rugby career ==
Taufo'ou made her international debut for the United States against Canada in November 2021.

She was named in the Eagles squad for the 2022 Pacific Four Series in New Zealand. She was selected in the Eagles squad for the 2021 Rugby World Cup in New Zealand. She scored the first try in their opening match against Italy at the tournament. She made her debut for Loughborough Lightning in the Premier 15s against Wasps in January 2022, she was the 100th player to represent the club.

In 2025, she played her last game for Lightning against Trailfinders. She then joined the Denver Onyx squad for the inaugural season of the Women's Elite Rugby competition. She played in the test against Japan in Los Angeles on April 26, the Eagles lost the closely contested game 33–39.

On July 17, she was selected for the Eagles side to the 2025 Women's Rugby World Cup that will be held in England.
