= Jenny Kronish =

American rugby union player

- Born: December 27, 1996 (age 29)
- Height: 6 ft 2 in (188 cm)
- Weight: 195 lb (88 kg)

Rugby union career
- Position: Lock
Senior career
Years	Team	Apps	(Points)
2022	Harlequins	-	(0)
2025–	Boston Banshees	2	(2)
International career
Years	Team	Apps	(Points)
2021–Present	United States	13	(0)

Jenny Kronish (born December 27, 1996) is an American rugby union player. She plays for the Eagles internationally, and recently joined the Boston Banshees for their inaugural season of the Women's Elite Rugby.

== Rugby career ==
Kronish played collegiately at Harvard University. She made her international debut for the United States against England in 2021.

In 2022, she joined English club, the Harlequins. She was named in the Eagles squad for the 2022 Pacific Four Series in New Zealand. She was selected in the Eagles squad for the 2021 Rugby World Cup in New Zealand.

In 2023, she was named in the Eagles traveling squad for their test against Spain, and for the 2023 Pacific Four Series. She was in the starting line-up when her side beat Spain 20–14.

On February 18, 2025, she joined the Boston Banshees for their inaugural season of the Women's Elite Rugby competition.
