= Rachel Johnson (rugby union) =

US international rugby union player

- Born: February 5, 1991 (age 35)
- Height: 1.7 m (5 ft 7 in)
- Weight: 82 kg (181 lb)

Rugby union career
- Position: Flanker
Senior career
Years	Team	Apps	(Points)
2020–2025	Exeter Chiefs	65	(125)
2025–	Denver Onyx	1	(1)
International career
Years	Team	Apps	(Points)
2018–	United States	40	(20)

Rachel Johnson (born February 5, 1991) is an American rugby union player. She plays Flanker for the United States and for Exeter Chiefs in the Premier 15s.

== Background ==
Johnson has a bachelor's degree in Community Health from Portland State University.

== Rugby career ==
Johnson made her Eagles debut against New Zealand in 2018. She joined Exeter Chiefs in 2020 and scored a try on her debut against Saracens and thus ending their 33-match winning streak.

She was named in the Eagles squad for the 2022 Pacific Four Series in New Zealand. She was selected in the Eagles squad for the 2021 Rugby World Cup in New Zealand.

Johnson was named in the Eagles traveling squad for the 2023 Pacific Four Series.

In 2025, she announced her retirement from Exeter Chiefs and the Premiership Women's Rugby competition. She is committed to playing for the Eagles in the Pacific Four Series in May and the Rugby World Cup, which will kickoff in August this year, but would not be returning to the PWR for the 2025–2026 season. She joined the Denver Onyx for the inaugural season of the Women's Elite Rugby competition.

She started in the Eagles 33–39 loss to Japan in Los Angeles on April 26, 2025. On July 17, she was selected for the Eagles side to the 2025 Women's Rugby World Cup that will be held in England.
