= Bulou Mataitoga =

US international rugby union player

- Born: April 8, 1994 (age 32) Suva, Fiji
- Height: 1.74 m (5 ft 9 in)
- Weight: 70 kg (154 lb)

Rugby union career
- Position: Fullback
Senior career
| Years | Team | Apps | (Points) |
| 2022–2025 | Loughborough Lightning | | (0) |
| 2025– | Bay Breakers | 1 | (0) |
International career
| Years | Team | Apps | (Points) |
| 2019– | United States | 22 | (0) |
National sevens team
| Years | Team | | Comps |
| 2016– | United States | | 16 |

Bulou Mataitoga (born April 8, 1994) is an American rugby player. She plays for the United States sevens and fifteens teams. She recently joined the Bay Breakers for the inaugural season of the Women's Elite Rugby competition.

== Rugby career ==
Mataitoga made her international sevens debut at the Dubai sevens in 2016. She made her test debut for the United States against England on June 28, 2019, in San Diego.

Mataitoga made her Premier 15s debut for Loughborough Lightning against the Wasps in January 2022. She featured for the Eagles squad at the 2022 Pacific Four Series in New Zealand. She was later named as a non-traveling reserve in the Eagles squad for the delayed 2021 Rugby World Cup.

Mataitoga was named in the Eagles traveling squad for their test against Spain, and for the 2023 Pacific Four Series. She started in the Eagles 20–14 win over Spain in Madrid.

On February 18, 2025, she was named in the Bay Breakers squad for their inaugural season of the Women's Elite Rugby competition. She scored a try in the closely contested test against Japan in Los Angeles on April 26, the Eagles lost the game 33–39.

On July 17, 2025, she was named in the Eagles side to the Women's Rugby World Cup in England. Mataitoga was later ruled out for the rest of the tournament after she sustained an injury during training.
