= Denver Onyx =

Women's rugby union club in Denver, Colorado

- Founded: January 2025; 1 year ago
- Location: Denver, Colorado
- Ground: Infinity Park
- Coach: Sarah Chobot
- Captain: TBA
- League: Women's Elite Rugby
- 2026: Champions (2nd title)

The Denver Onyx are an American semi-professional women's rugby union team based in Denver, Colorado. The team was founded in 2025 and is scheduled to play in the inaugural Women's Elite Rugby season.

The franchise is led by Nick Donnelly as Senior General Manager (SGM) and Rachel Pierce as Assistant General Manager (AGM), who oversee all team operations, sponsorships, and community engagement initiatives.

== History ==
Since Denver has a history in mining for rare gems and metals, the team name is derived from the Colorado rose onyx, "a gem which is featured in the foundation of the Colorado state capitol building and known for its colors that reflect a Colorado sunset." The black onyx which is also mined in the state "represents strength, courage and determination symbolising the sheer grit and resilience of these athletes." The logo features gemstones in these contrasting colors of black and bright pink.

Former Eagles representative, Sarah Chobot, was appointed to be the first head coach of the Denver franchise. She currently serves as an assistant coach on the USA Women's Eagles team.

Denver Onyx named Erica Coulibaly, Rachel Ehrecke, McKenzie Hawkins, Maya Learned, and Tahna Wilfley as their five foundational members.

Their matches were played at Infinity Park in Glendale, Colorado. They won the inaugural season of the Women's Elite Rugby competition after defeating the New York Exiles 53–13.

== Players ==
=== Current squad ===
The Denver Onyx squad for the 2025 Women's Elite Rugby season is:

Note: Flags indicate national union under World Rugby eligibility rules. Players may hold more than one non-World Rugby nationality.

Player	Position	Union
Jeanna Beard	Hooker	United States
Saher Hamdan	Hooker	United States
Gianna Solomon	Hooker	United States
Sheila Decker	Prop	United States
Laura LaVigne	Prop	United States
**Maya Learned**	Prop	United States
Evie Oglesby	Prop	United States
Gabby Rivera	Prop	United States
**Rachel Ehrecke**	Lock	United States
Hannah Long	Lock	United States
Amy Spafford	Lock	United States
**Hallie Taufo'ou**	Lock	United States
Kapoina Bailey	Back row	United States
**Tahlia Brody**	Back row	United States
Carson Hann	Back row	United States
**Rachel Johnson**	Back row	United States

Player	Position	Union
Monique Coffey	Scrum-half	Canada
Kelsie O'Brien	Scrum-half	United States
Carly Waters	Scrum-half	United States
Alessandra Cruz	Fly-half	United States
**Kristin Bitter**	Fly-half	United States
**McKenzie Hawkins**	Fly-half	United States
Justine Perl	Fly-half	United States
Julie Tordonato	Centre	United States
**Joanne Fa'avesi**	Centre	United States
**Erica Coulibaly**	Wing	United States
Denali Graham	Wing	United States
Kiana Lally	Wing	United States
KB Slaughter	Wing	United States
Tahna Wilfley	Wing	United States

Senior 15s internationally capped players are listed in bold.
