= Hannah Stolba =

US international rugby union player

- Born: 2 June 1982 (age 44)

Rugby union career
- Position: Fly-half
Provincial / State sides
Years	Team	Apps	(Points)
2016, 2019	Otago		
International career
Years	Team	Apps	(Points)
2014–2017	United States	12	
Coaching career
- Years: Team
- 2025–: Bay Breakers (Head Coach)
- ?–2024: Berkeley All Blues (Head Coach)

Hannah Stolba (born June 2, 1982) is an American rugby union coach and former player. She was a member of the United States team in the 2010 and 2014 Women's Rugby World Cup's. She was recently appointed Bay Breakers Head Coach for the inaugural season of the Women's Elite Rugby competition.

== Early career ==
Stolba played basketball in college and attended her first rugby practice in the spring of her freshman year. She initially started at Lock in 2001 for Northern Iowa before transferring to Minnesota State Mankato where she played in the Back row. She played for the Minnesota U-23s and Midwest U-23s at Lock and Back row before Minnesota Valkyries coach, Barb Fugate, saw her kick.

== Rugby career ==
=== Playing career ===
She traveled to New Zealand as a Fly-half with the United States U-23s. She spent six years with the Minnesota Valkyries, then played for the Berkley All Blues for a season, and then spent eight years with the different iterations of Glendale in Denver.

Stolba was selected for the United States squad in the 2010 Rugby World Cup in England, but did not get to play. It wasn't until she made the Eagles 2014 Rugby World Cup squad as a Fullback did she get some game time.

She played for Otago in 2016 and 2019 in the Farah Palmer Cup in New Zealand. From 2019 to 2020 she played for El Salvador in Spain in the División de Honor for her last season.

=== Coaching career ===
Stolba started coaching rugby with the University of Colorado in 2011. She competed her master's degree in Sports Coaching in 2013 and has been coaching in various capacities since then.

She was the head coach of the Berkeley All Blues of the Women's Premier League. She helped guide them to a WPL Championship title in 2022 and as runners up in 2023 and 2024. She was appointed as the Bay Breakers first Head Coach for the inaugural season of the Women's Elite Rugby competition.
