= Rachel Ehrecke =

US international rugby union player

- Born: December 6, 1995 (age 30) Minnesota
- Height: 5 ft 8 in (173 cm)
- Weight: 165 lb (75 kg)

Rugby union career
- Position: Flanker
Senior career
Years	Team	Apps	(Points)
2023	DMP Sharks	13	(10)
2025–	Denver Onyx	1	(0)
International career
Years	Team	Apps	(Points)
2021–	United States	26	(0)

Rachel Ehrecke (born December 6, 1999) is an American rugby union player. She plays at an international level for the United States. She joined Denver Onyx for the inaugural season of Women's Elite Rugby. She previously played for DMP Sharks in the Premiership Women's Rugby in England.

== Rugby career ==
Ehrecke made her test debut for the United States against Canada in 2021. She was named in the starting line-up in her second test against Ireland, the Eagles lost 20–10. In her third appearance, the Eagles were defeated by England who ran in 15 unanswered tries for a record 89–0 score.

In 2023, she joined the DMP Sharks for the remainder of the 2022–23 Premier 15s season. She was named in the Eagles traveling squad for the 2023 Pacific Four Series.

She joined the Denver Onyx squad for the inaugural season of the Women's Elite Rugby competition in 2025. She played in the Eagles 33–39 loss to Japan in Los Angeles on April 26, 2025. On July 17, she was selected for the Eagles side to the 2025 Women's Rugby World Cup that will be held in England.
