= Centreville Bank Stadium =

Soccer stadium in Rhode Island, U.S.

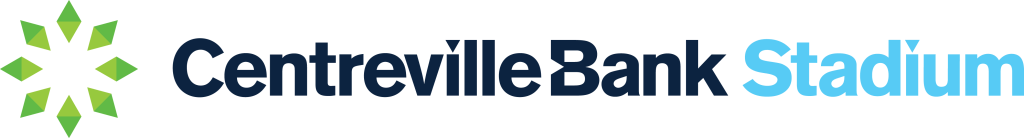

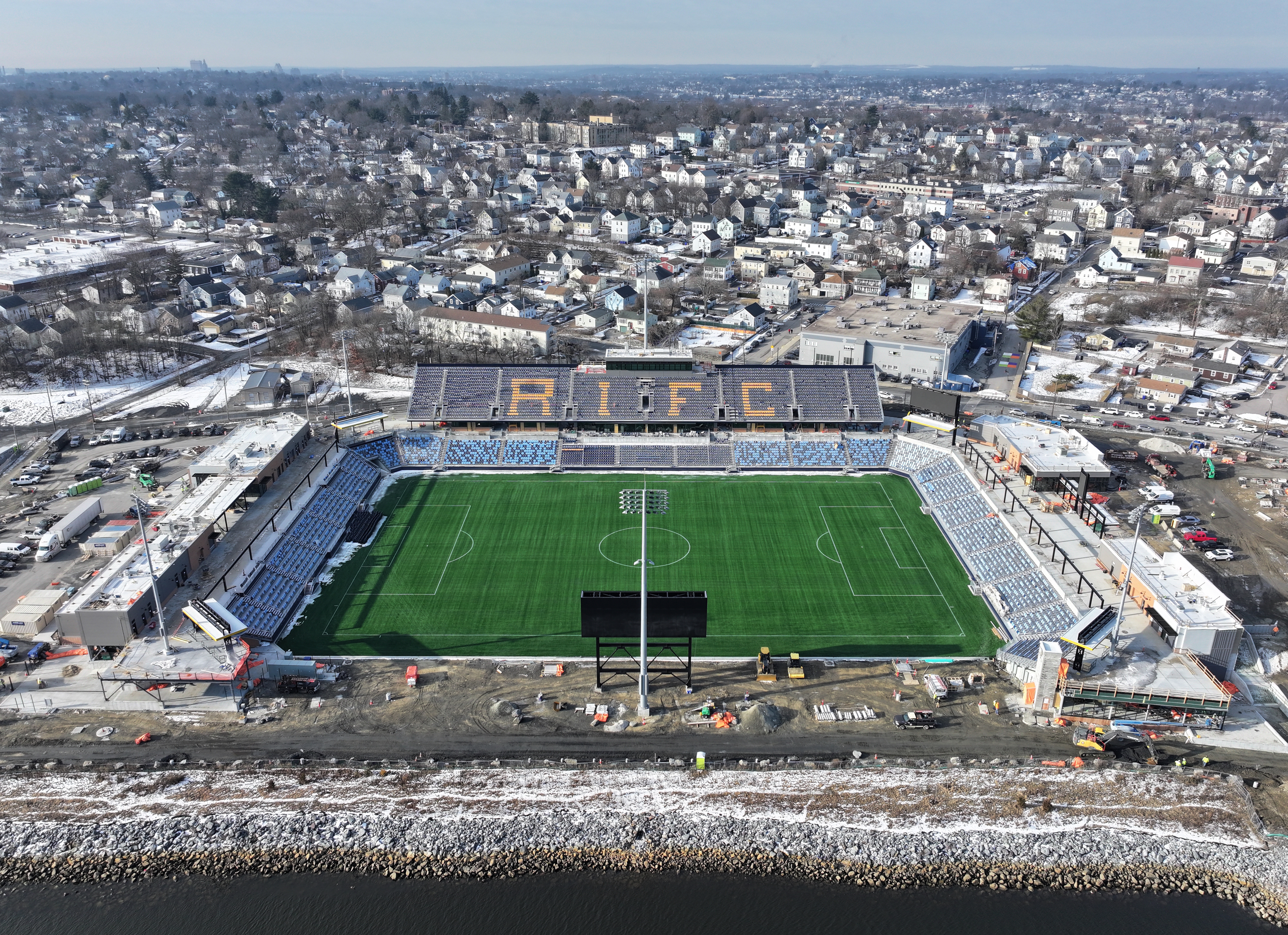
- Construction almost finished in early 2025
- Interactive map of Centreville Bank Stadium
- Former names: Tidewater Landing Stadium (during construction)
- Address: 200 Taft Street; Pawtucket, Rhode Island; United States of America
- Coordinates: 41°52′08″N 71°22′57″W
- Owner: Fortuitous Partners
- Capacity: 10,500
- Surface: FieldTurf
- Scoreboard: Daktronics - Primary 60 x 21.5 feet, Secondary 40 x 15.5 feet
- Record attendance: 10,749 (July 5, 2025, RIFC)

Construction
- Groundbreaking: August 16, 2022
- Built: 2022–2025
- Opened: May 3, 2025
- Cost: US$132,000,000
- Architects: Odell, JCJ Architecture
- General contractor: Commerce Corporation
- Main contractor: Dimeo Construction

Tenants
- Rhode Island FC (USLC) (2025–present); Boston Banshees (WER) (2025); Boston Legacy FC (NWSL) (2026-2027); Rhode Island Rams football (2026); New England Revolution (2026); Rhode Island Breakers (UFL) (2027–future)

Website
- centrevillebankstadium.com

Centreville Bank Stadium is a 10,500-seat soccer-specific stadium in Pawtucket, Rhode Island, United States. It is the home of Rhode Island FC, a member of the USL Championship in the second division of American soccer, the interim home of Boston Legacy FC for the 2027 National Women's Soccer League seaosn, and is planned to be the home of the Rhode Island Breakers of the United Football League. The stadium is located on the banks of the Seekonk River as a part of a larger neighborhood development called Tidewater Landing.

== History ==
=== Development ===
The stadium was first announced on December 3, 2019, by then-Governor Gina Raimondo and Pawtucket Mayor Donald Grebien at an estimated cost of US$80 million, with a seating capacity of 7,500. The development, initially called Tidewater Landing, aimed at developing the riverfront and creating a new mixed used development at a total cost of around $400 million. The stadium was expected to open by 2022, ready for the Rhode Island FC to begin play in the 2022 USL Championship season.

Construction over the development was hindered with problems regarding the site, as toxic materials due to industrial waste led to dangerous levels of toxins being found in the soil on the development site. However, by October 2022 the contaminated waste was cleared and construction was greenlighted, with Dimeo Construction named as the primary construction contractor.

=== Financial issues ===
Funding stood to be a constant issue for the Tidewater stadium. With worries over safeguards and guarantees over public money being used properly, with the need of private funding and multiple rounds of grants to help contribute to construction. June 2022 put the project into question, as the state government stood at a deadlock on whether or not to accept a request by developers for $30 million more dollars to continue construction, jumping the projected cost from $59 million to $126 million. After a 6–5 vote, with two abstaining, $36 million in funds, that was originally set aside towards funding apartments and homes on the development site, was redirected all towards the construction of the stadium.

Public bonds were again withheld in March 2023, citing market worries due to rising inflation and continued effects from the COVID-19 pandemic. By early 2024, all funding for the stadium had been secured, mostly in the form of bonds expected to be paid back over a time period of thirty years, totaling around $54 million.

=== Construction ===
A ground-breaking ceremony was hosted in August 2022, before being paused due to a lack of funding. Construction resumed by the fourth quarter of 2023, before construction again was paused in early 2024 due to a new issue arising on the subject of funding. Finally, construction was finally continued by February 2024. The main structure beams were all put into place by mid-June 2024, celebrated in a topping-off ceremony.

Installation of seats began in late September 2024. By December 2024, installations of the seats, sound system, and video board had been completed, and the artificial turf began to be installed. Construction was completed by early May, just in time for Rhode Island FC's first home match at the stadium, with a final cost of the stadium being $132 million.

Naming rights for the new stadium were announced on April 8, 2025 with Centreville Bank becoming the official stadium naming partner.

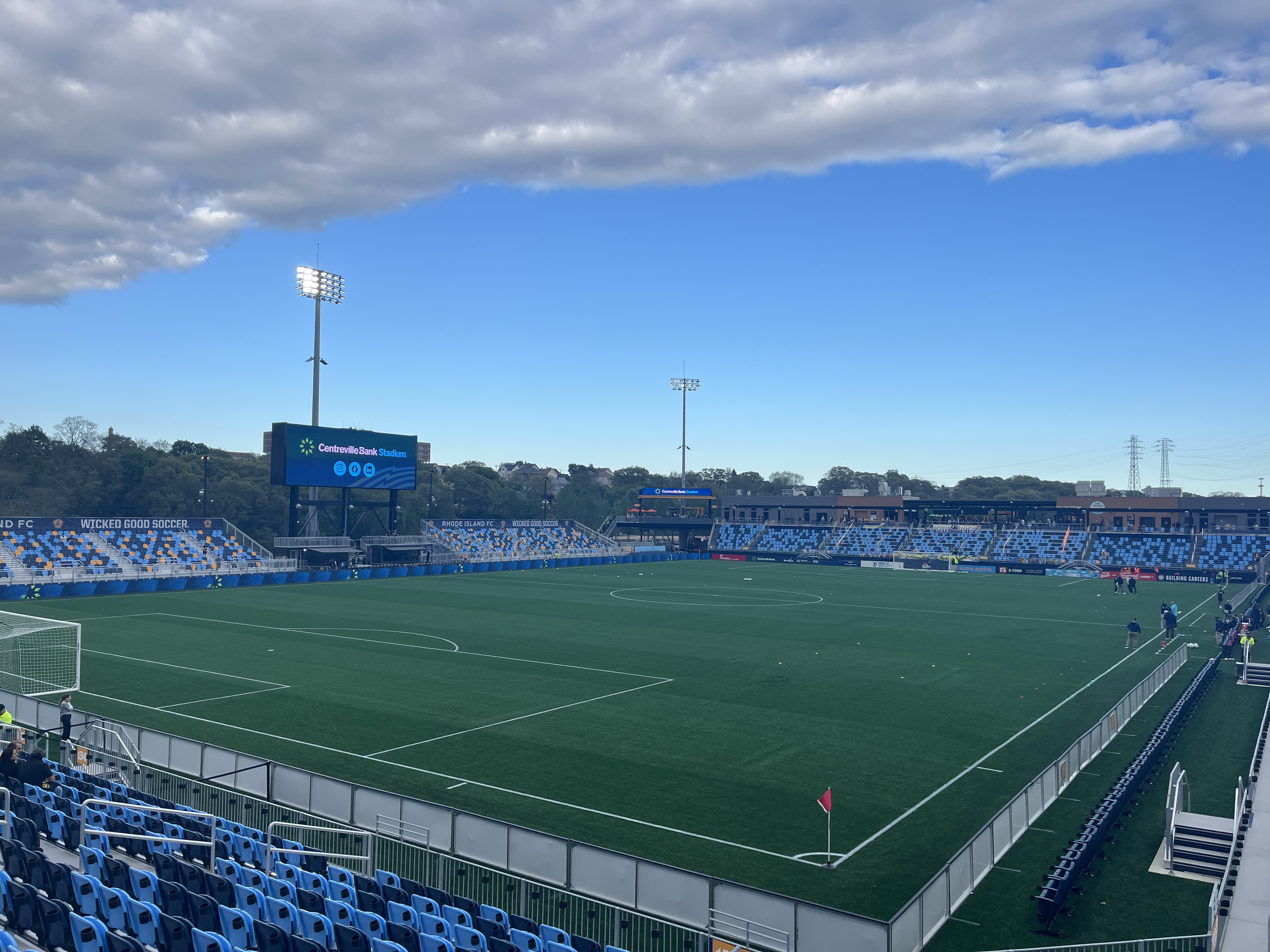
A view of the pitch in May 2025 before an Open Cup match between Rhode Island FC and the New England Revolution.

=== Opening ===
The stadium opened on May 3, 2025, for Rhode Island FC's scheduled regular season home game against San Antonio FC, resulting in a scoreless draw and an over-capacity announced attendance of 10,700. The team could host a game in the third round of the 2025 US Open Cup before the regular season opener. The first goal in stadium history was scored by Tomás Chancalay of the New England Revolution on May 7, 2025, in the Revolution's 2–1 2025 U.S. Open Cup win over Rhode Island F.C. In their first season at the stadium, Rhode Island FC drew a total attendance of 166,598 spectators and had five sellouts; the largest crowd—10,749 against Birmingham Legion FC on July 5—set a club record.

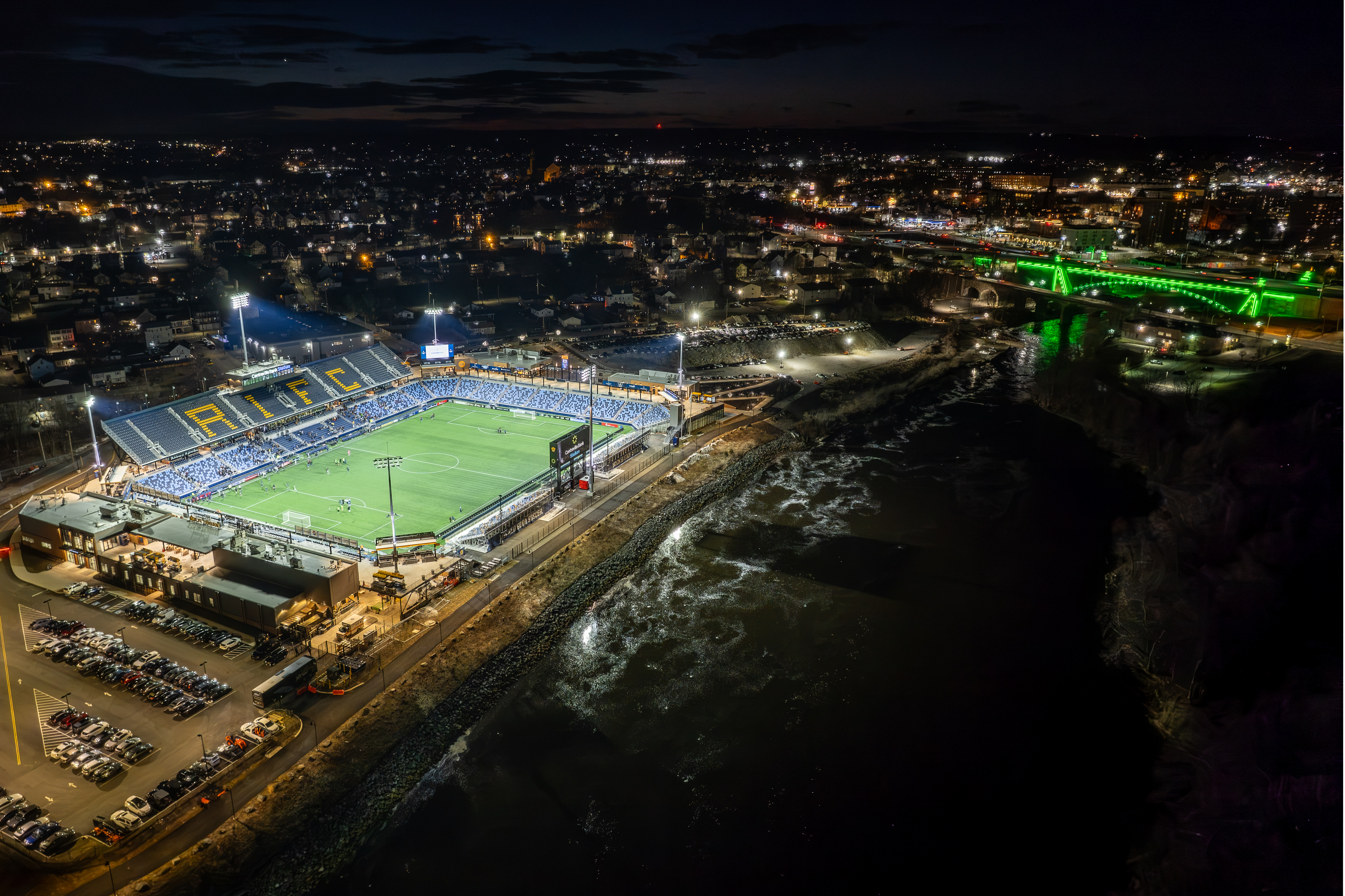
A view of the stadium during a match on March 17, 2026

== Events ==
=== Soccer ===
Centreville Bank Stadium has been home to Rhode Island FC of the USL Championship since its opening on May 3, 2025. It has also hosted a US Open Cup match against MLS clubs and international friendlies.

Boston Legacy FC of the National Women's Soccer League played seven home games at the stadium in 2026, and are scheduled to play all of their home games there in 2027, while renovation work continues at their future home venue White Stadium in Boston.

The New England Revolution of Major League Soccer played two "home" games in the 2026 U.S. Open Cup at the stadium, one of which was against the stadium's usual tenant and owner, Rhode Island FC.

==== International matches ====
Date	Teams	Match Type	Attendance	Notes
June 1, 2025	Puerto Rico 1–1 Nicaragua	International Friendly	TBA	

=== Rugby ===
On February 19, 2025, it was announced that the final three regular season matches of the inaugural Women's Elite Rugby season for the Boston Banshees would be played at Centreville Bank Stadium.

On April 23, 2025, Major League Rugby announced Centreville Bank Stadium as the host of the 2025 MLR Championship, the first time the event will be held in a market that does not host an MLR team.

Date	Teams	Match Type	Attendance	Notes
June 28, 2025	Houston SaberCats (Texas) 22–28 (Massachusetts) New England Free Jacks	2025 MLR Championship Final	5,702	

=== American football ===
In 2025, Centreville Bank Stadium hosted the Governor's Cup between Brown and Rhode Island, a rivalry match between two of the biggest colleges in Rhode Island.

Both schools returned to the stadium in 2026. Rhode Island will play its home games there while Meade Stadium undergoes renovations. while Brown moved its Harvard meeting from Richard Gouse Field at Brown Stadium to Centreville Bank Stadium.

On September 23, 2026, the United Football League announced that Rhode Island will get a team in the league starting with the 2027 season, who, alongside Colorado Springs, Colorado, will replace the Birmingham Stallions and Houston Gamblers. Its home games will be at Centreville Bank Stadium.

Date	Teams	Match Type	Attendance	Notes
October 3, 2025	Brown Bears 28–21 Rhode Island Rams	2025 Governor's Cup	5,047	

Preceded by Beirne Stadium	Home of Rhode Island FC; 2025–present	Succeeded by Current
Preceded by Snapdragon Stadium	Host of MLR Championship; 2025	Succeeded by SeatGeek Stadium
