= Twin Cities Gemini =

Women's Rugby club in Minneapolis–Saint Paul

- Founded: January 2025; 1 year ago
- Location: Minneapolis–Saint Paul
- Ground: TCO Stadium
- Coach: Sylvia Braaten
- Captain: TBA
- League: Women's Elite Rugby
- 2025: 5th

The Twin Cities Gemini (also known as T.C. Gemini) are an American semi-professional women's rugby union team based in Minneapolis–Saint Paul. The team was founded in 2025 and is scheduled to play in the inaugural Women's Elite Rugby season.

== History ==
The Twin Cities Gemini name refers to the zodiac sign of the twins that is represented by intertwined snakes, which mimicks the way that the Mississippi River winds through Minnesota. The colors and design of the crest utilizes the colors of Deep Venom, Serpent Green, and Ice Blue that are often found in the aurora borealis that appears in the northern Minnesota skies, while also embracing the twin representation of the entangled snakes.

Former Eagles, Sylvia Braaten, was appointed as the franchise's first Head Coach; she represented the United States at the 2014 and 2017 Rugby World Cup's. The T.C. Gemini's named Emerson Allen, Abbey Jacobs, Marisa Hall, Katrina Nunes, and Tatyana Reed as their five foundational members. The side will be playing their matches at the TCO Stadium in Eagan, Minnesota.

The team is managed by Senior GM Nick Donnelly and Assistant GM Rachel Pierce.

== Players ==
=== Current squad ===
The Twin Cities Gemini squad for the 2025 Women's Elite Rugby season is:

Note: Flags indicate national union under World Rugby eligibility rules. Players may hold more than one non-World Rugby nationality.

Player	Position	Union
Sam Brackett	Forward	United States
Ali Gillberg	Forward	United States
Emilee Jalosuo	Forward	United States
**Alivia Leatherman**	Forward	United States
Hannah Pfersch	Forward	United States
Josie Rogers	Forward	United States
Mikey Williams	Forward	United States
**Emerson Allen**	Forward	United States
Marisa Hall	Forward	United States
Abbey Jacobs	Forward	United States
Emily Juhl	Forward	United States
Lucy Leatherman	Forward	United States
Brooke Doerscher	Forward	United States
Emily Mack	Forward	United States
Katrina Nunes	Forward	United States
Antonina O'Neill	Forward	United States
Tara Viken	Forward	United States

Player	Position	Union
Sam Black	Back	United States
Bianca Curtis	Back	United States
Maggie Kleyer	Back	United States
Desiree Leaupepe	Back	United States
Tatyana Reed	Back	United States
Joana Marrese	Back	United States
Trinity Todd	Back	United States
Ciara Clawson	Back	United States
Isabelle Currie	Back	United States
Kailynn Hampton	Back	United States
Kayla Lawson	Back	United States
Serena Liu	Back	United States

- Senior 15s internationally capped players are listed in **bold**.
