= McKenzie Hawkins =

American rugby union player (born 1997)

- Born: January 8, 1997 (age 29)
- Height: 5 ft 9 in (175 cm)
- Weight: 160 lb (73 kg)

Rugby union career
- Position(s): Fly-half, Center, Fullback
Senior career
Years	Team	Apps	(Points)
2025–	Denver Onyx	1	(0)
International career
Years	Team	Apps	(Points)
2018–	United States	29	(77)

McKenzie Hawkins (born January 8, 1997) is an American rugby union player. She plays at Flyhalf for the United States. She competed at the 2021 and 2025 Women's Rugby World Cups.

== Early life and career ==
Hawkins was born in Knoxville, Tennessee, and played soccer at the age of four.

She attended Maryville High School in Tennessee, and was named to the USA Rugby High School All Americans in 2014. It was her third All-American selection in just two years. She committed to Lindenwood University for her college career and helped lead the team to three consecutive national championships in both 7's and 15's. She attained a Ph.D. in Atmospheric Physics.

In 2018, She was awarded the MA Sorensen Collegiate Rugby Player of the Year.

== Rugby career ==
Hawkins made her test debut for the United States against New Zealand in November 2018. She was selected in the Eagles squad for the deferred 2021 Rugby World Cup in New Zealand.

In 2023, she was named in the Eagles traveling squad for their test against Spain, and for the Pacific Four Series. She started for the Eagles in their 20–14 win against Spain in Madrid.

Hawkins joined the Denver Onyx squad for the inaugural season of the Women's Elite Rugby competition in 2025. She scored 8 points in the closely contested test against Japan in Los Angeles on April 26, 2025, the Eagles lost the game 33–39.

On July 17, she was selected for the Eagles side to the 2025 Women's Rugby World Cup that will be held in England.
