= Chicago Tempest =

Women's rugby union club in Chicago, Illinois

- Founded: January 2025; 1 year ago
- Location: Chicago, Illinois
- Ground: Benedictine University
- Coach: Kristin Zdanczewicz
- Captain: Ilene Andrade
- League: Women's Elite Rugby
- 2025: 6th

The Chicago Tempest are an American semi-professional women's rugby union team based in Chicago, Illinois. The team was founded in 2025 and is scheduled to play in the inaugural Women's Elite Rugby season.

== History ==
The Chicago Tempest team name references the extreme weather often experienced in the Windy City. The Tempest's "plan to bring destruction, power, and unyielding challenge on the pitch and to their opponents. As the winters test the spirit of Chicagoeans but never break their will, the team reflects a thunderous storm and reckoning force." The team crest features a storm in its momentum above the iconic Willis Tower tied together with the colors of Lightning Yellow and Tempest Gray.

Bryan Colbridge was appointed to be Chicago Tempest's first head coach. He has played and coached in the United Kingdom, New Zealand, and the United States for over 15 years. He has coached at high school, collegiate and senior level rugby for women and men. Anabel Diaz, Emma Farnan, Cienna Jordan, Betty Nguyen, and Kadie Sanford were named as foundational players for the team. The home games for their inaugural season were played at Northwestern Medicine Field at Martin Stadium on the campus of Northwestern University in Evanston, Illinois. In 2026, home matches will be at the football stadium at Benedictine University.

Kristin Zdanczewicz was named as head coach for 2026, she previously served as acting head coach for the Tempest's during part of the 2025 season.

== Players ==
=== Current squad ===
The Chicago Tempest squad for the 2025 Women's Elite Rugby season is:

Note: Flags indicate national union under World Rugby eligibility rules. Players may hold more than one non-World Rugby nationality.

Player	Position	Union
Jayla Twitty	Hooker	United States
Ilene Andrade	Hooker	United States
Ashley Mencke	Prop	United States
Anabel Diaz	Prop	United States
Tito Harrison	Prop	United States
Christen Jackson	Prop	United States
Narcisse Jordan	Prop	United States
Kadie Sanford	Prop	United States
Sarah Anderson	Lock	United States
Sarah Curvin	Lock	United States
Ellie Reiter	Lock	United States
Olga Niyibizi	Back row	United States
Ubaida Ahmed	Back row	United States
Katie Lamont	Back row	United States
Abby Albrecht	Back row	United States
Kit Buzby	Back row	United States
Amaryha McGowan	Back row	United States

Player	Position	Union
Jess Dombrowski	Scrum-half	United States
Erika Farias	Scrum-half	United States
Nicole Fisch	Scrum-half	United States
Taylor White	Fly-half	United States
Hali Deters	Fly-half	United States
Brooke Walklate	Fly-half	United States
Adriana Silva	Centre	United States
Indigo Niznik-Darden	Centre	United States
Emma Farnan	Centre	United States
MarCaya Bailous	Wing	United States
Lauren Kuffel	Wing	United States
Betty Nguyen	Wing	United States
Isla Alejandro	Fullback	England

- Senior 15s internationally capped players are listed in **bold**.
