= New York Exiles =

Women's rugby union club in New York

- Founded: January 2025; 1 year ago
- Location: New York, New York
- Ground: The Stadium at Memorial Field
- Coach: Diego Maquieira
- Captain: TBA
- League: Women's Elite Rugby
- 2025: Runners-up

The New York Exiles are an American semi-professional women's rugby union team in New York, New York. The team competed in Women's Elite Rugby’s inaugural season, 2025.

== History ==
The team name and crest is a nod to the Statue of Liberty who is known as the "Mother of Exiles". The three hooded figures on the crest represents Ellis Island as a "journey to a new life" but also "the boldness to step out in a sport that is often seen exiled in mainstream sport culture." The figures within the crest also give a nod to the "superhero typography associated with New York." The crest also uses the torch as the city's symbolism for liberty and illumination. The team colors consist of Night Navy, Liberty and Shadow Teal, and Torch Orange which mirrors and unites with the teal-based color palettes of Professional teams from New York, such as the New York Liberty (WNBA), New York Sirens (PWHL), and NJ/NY Gotham FC (NWSL).

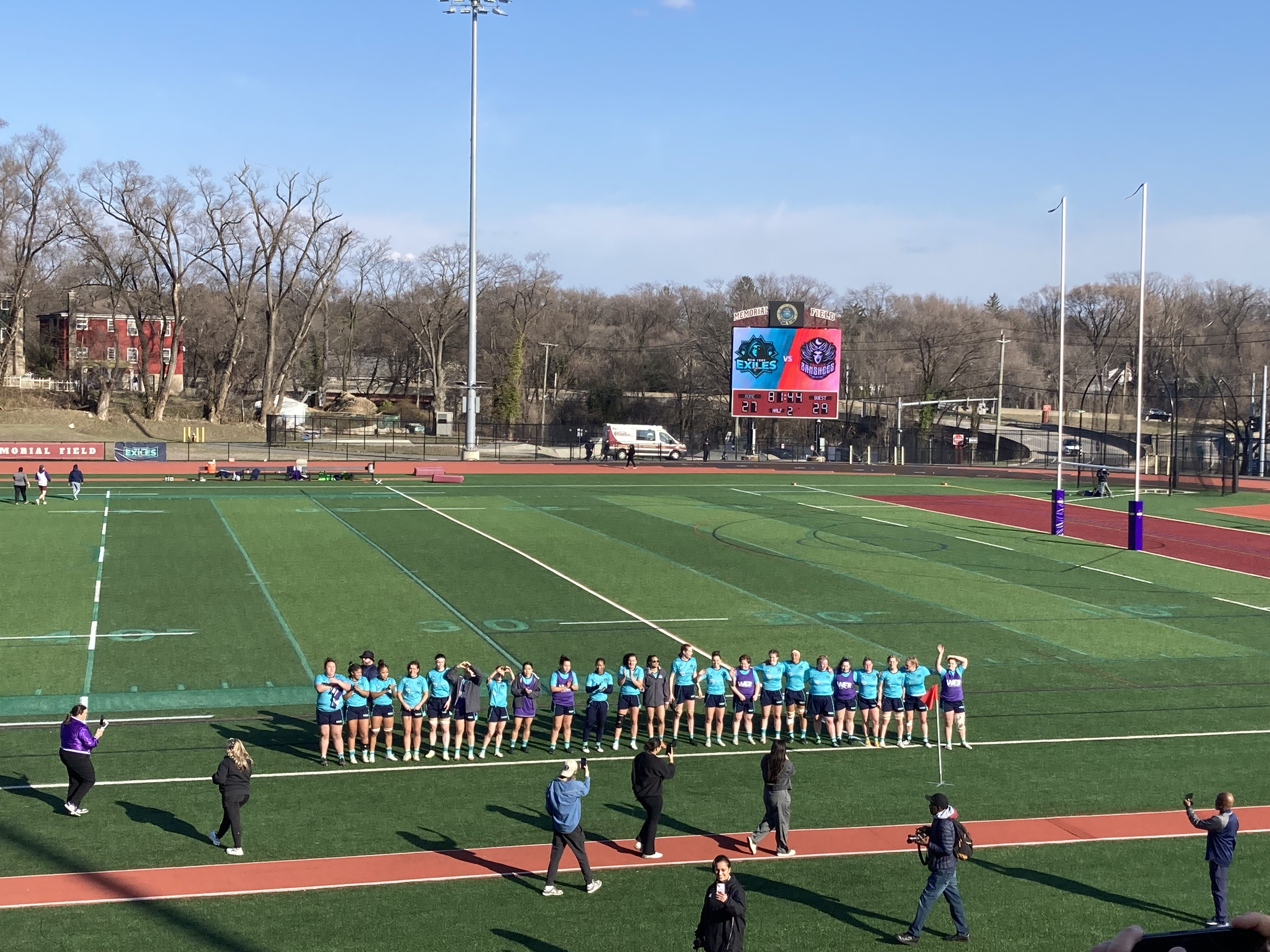
New York Exiles after their inaugural home game at the Stadium at Memorial Field in March 2025.

Diego Maquieira was selected to be the first head coach of the franchise. He was born and raised in Queens, New York, and most recently served as the head coach for the New York Rugby Club in the WPL. The following players were named as foundational players for the team in preparation for their inaugural season starting in March 2025: Adriana Castillo, Jenn Salomon-Clayton, Matilda Kocaj, Congetta Owens, and Misha Green-Yotts. The team's games will be played at The Stadium at Memorial Field with a capacity of 4,000–5,000.

The Exiles finished the inaugural season of the Women's Elite Rugby competition as runners-up after losing to the Denver Onyx 53–13 in the final for the Legacy Cup.

== Players ==
=== Current squad ===
The New York Exiles squad for the 2026 Women's Elite Rugby season is:

Note: Flags indicate national union under World Rugby eligibility rules. Players may hold more than one non-World Rugby nationality.

Player	Position	Union
Caoimhe O'Sullivan Roche	Hooker	United States
Jessie Ruiz	Hooker	United States
Faith Morley	Hooker	United States
Kathryn Lanzante	Prop	United States
Emily Brower	Prop	United States
Laurell Cuza	Prop	United States
Sophia Zaragoza	Prop	United States
Cam Osses	Prop	United States
Jessica Salud	Lock	United States
Nic Carroll	Lock	United States
Cari Pick	Lock	United States
Alicia Bush	Lock	United States
Ana van Ravenswaay	Lock	United States
Adriana Castillo	Back row	United States
Chloe Jex	Back row	United States
Daisy Titus	Back row	United States
Misha Green-Yotts	Back row	United States
Abigael Green-Yotts	Back row	United States
Gio Cruz	Back row	United States
Jane Carino	Back row	United States

Player	Position	Union
Caitlyn Caldon	Scrum-half	United States
Sarah Minahan	Scrum-half	United States
Maggie Ribardo	Scrum-half	United States
Jade Greenfield	Fly-half	United States
Jetta Owens	Fly-half	United States
Sophie Frick	Centre	United States
Jenn Salomon-Clayton	Centre	United States
Mahdia Parker	Centre	United States
Justina DeBruzzi	Centre	United States
Fabiola Millien-Faustin	Centre	United States
Scout Cheeks	Centre	United States
Erin Walsh	Wing	United States
Jordyn Marlin	Wing	United States
Chase Mauerhan	Fullback	United States
Eve Mango	Fullback	United States

- Senior 15s internationally capped players are listed in **bold**.
