= The Stadium at Memorial Field =

Stadium in Mount Vernon, New York, US

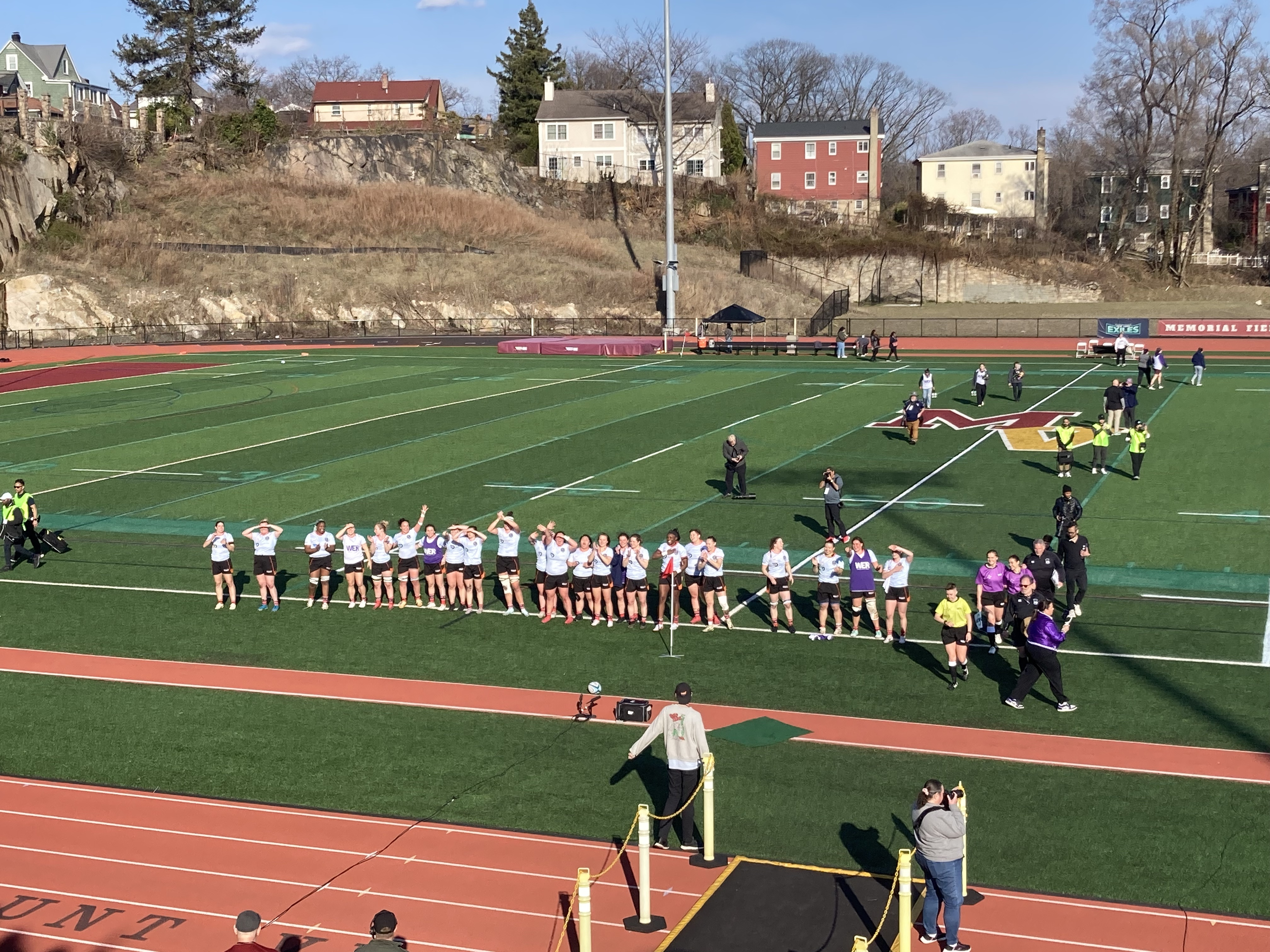
- View from the grandstand in March 2025
- Interactive map of The Stadium at Memorial Field
- Former names: The Stadium at Memorial Field
- Location: Mount Vernon, New York
- Coordinates: 40°54′11″N 73°49′3″W
- Capacity: 3,900
- Public transit: Bee-Line Bus System route 42

Construction
- Opened: 1931
- Renovated: 2022

Tenants
- Mount Vernon High School; Westchester Bulls (ACFL) (1967–1968); New York Crusaders (ACFL) (1973); Rugby New York (MLR) (2023); Monroe Mustangs (2023–); Westchester SC (2025-); New York Exiles (WER) (2026–); New York Empire (UFA) (2026–)

The Stadium at Memorial Field is a multi-purpose stadium located in Mount Vernon, New York.

The stadium is home to USL League One club Westchester SC and has a capacity of 3,900.

== History ==
=== Early uses ===
The stadium opened in 1931, and was used by local high schools and youth sporting events. Additionally, the stadium hosted boxing matches and concerts, including The Jackson 5 and James Brown.

The stadium was home of the Westchester Bulls of the Atlantic Coast Football League (ACFL) in 1967 and 1968. The New York Crusaders of the ACFL played at the stadium in 1973.

However, in the late 1900s, the stadium was in a state of disrepair.

=== Renovations ===
In 2022, the field reopened after a $40 million renovation project that included renovated locker rooms, concessions, and facilities.

The first athletic event to be held at the newly renovated stadium was a high school football game between Mount Vernon High School and Yonkers Force co-op. Mount Vernon won 32 to 24.

The stadium is also home to the Monroe University football team.

Westchester SC, a professional soccer team who made their debut in 2025, play their home matches at the stadium.
