= Bay Breakers =

Women's rugby club in Lodi, California

- Founded: January 2025; 1 year ago
- Location: Lodi, California
- Ground: Grape Bowl Stadium
- Coach: Hannah Stolba
- Captain: TBA
- League: Women's Elite Rugby
- 2025: 3rd

The Bay Breakers are an American semi-professional women's rugby union team based in Lodi, California. The team was founded in 2025 and is scheduled to play in the inaugural Women's Elite Rugby season.

== History ==
Hannah Stolba was announced as the team's first Head Coach, she most recently served as the head coach of the Berkeley All Blues of the Women's Premier League and led them to a Championship in 2022 and as runners-up in 2023 and 2024. She has also represented the United States women's national rugby union team at the 2010 and 2014 Rugby World Cup's.

The team named the following players as their foundational five members: Olivia Bernadel-Huey, Elena Edwards, Celine Liulamaga, Jade McGrath, and Roxelle Thomas. The Bay Breakers will host games at the Grape Bowl Stadium in Lodi, California.

== Players ==
=== Current squad ===
The Bay Breakers squad for the 2026 Women's Elite Rugby season is:

Note: Flags indicate national union under World Rugby eligibility rules. Players may hold more than one non-World Rugby nationality.

Player	Position	Union
Mimi Marquez	Hooker	United States
Hope Cooper	Hooker	United States
Aly Namosimalua	Hooker	United States
Elena Edwards	Prop	United States
Abby Vogel	Prop	United States
Krista Matsumura	Prop	United States
Cristina Bravo	Prop	United States
Mona Lisa Tupou	Prop	United States
Paris Hart	Prop	New Zealand
Ari Jurkowski	Lock	United States
Tonya Wessman	Lock	United States
May Hirano Lauritzen	Lock	United States
Roxelle Thomas	Back row	United States
Roseline Okpara	Back row	United States
Cassandra Tong	Back row	United States
Sophie Lamphier	Back row	United States
Nyah Cordero	Back row	United States

Player	Position	Union
Nikki Lynch	Back row	United States
Charmaine Sheffield	Back row	New Zealand
**Taina Tukuafu**	Scrum-half	United States
Joana Marrese	Scrum-half	Brazil
Shelby Lin	Scrum-half	United States
Laura Bocek	Fly-half	United States
Kristen Siano	Fly-half	United States
Venaiah Mamea	Centre	United States
Jade-Alexandra McGrath	Centre	United States
Tapaita Satini	Centre	United States
Mariah Overby	Centre	United States
Miriama Marawa	Wing	Fiji
Laura Thacker	Wing	United States
Omi Carrillo	Wing	United States
Falalauloa Amanoni	Wing	Fiji
Emma Hovanec	Wing	United States
D'Ondra Bomar	Wing	United States
Olivia Bernadel-Huey	Fullback	United States

- Senior 15s internationally capped players are listed in **bold**.
