= United States women's national rugby union team =

United States
- Nickname: Eagles
- Union: USA Rugby
- Head coach: Jack Hanratty
- Captain: Georgie Perris-Redding
- Most caps: Hope Rogers (59)
| First colours | Second colours |

World Rugby ranking
- Current: 6 (as of 28 October 2026)

First international
- Canada 3–22 United States (Victoria, British Columbia, Canada; November 14, 1987)

Biggest win
- Japan 0–121 United States (Melrose, Scotland; April 15, 1994)

Biggest defeat
- England 89–0 United States (Worcester, England; November 21, 2021)

World Cup
- Appearances: 10 (First in 1991)
- Best result: Champions (1991)

Women's World Rugby Rankings Top 20 rankings as of 6 April 2026
| Rank | Change* | Team | Points |
|---|---|---|---|
| 1 | Steady | England | 98.09 |
| 2 | Steady | Canada | 91.53 |
| 3 | Steady | New Zealand | 89.85 |
| 4 | Steady | France | 83.60 |
| 5 | Steady | Ireland | 78.20 |
| 6 | Steady | Scotland | 77.39 |
| 7 | Steady | Australia | 75.46 |
| 8 | Steady | United States | 72.90 |
| 9 | Steady | Italy | 72.37 |
| 10 | Steady | South Africa | 71.62 |
| 11 | Steady | Japan | 69.72 |
| 12 | Steady | Wales | 66.13 |
| 13 | Steady | Fiji | 63.98 |
| 14 | Steady | Spain | 62.42 |
| 15 | Steady | Samoa | 59.72 |
| 16 | Steady | Hong Kong | 57.56 |
| 17 | Steady | Netherlands | 57.42 |
| 18 | Steady | Russia | 55.10 |
| 19 | Steady | Kazakhstan | 53.88 |
| 20 | ▲1 | Germany | 51.10 |
*Change from the previous week

The USA Women's national rugby union team, nicknamed the Women's Eagles, represents the United States in women's international rugby union. The team was officially formed in 1987 and is nicknamed the Eagles.

An international powerhouse during the 1990s— the Eagles won the inaugural 1991 Women's World Cup and finished second in the two following World Cups in 1994 and 1998. The team finished fourth at the 2017 Rugby World Cup in Ireland.

In May 2018, Rob Cain was appointed full-time Head Coach. Cain joined the Eagles after winning the inaugural Tyrell Premier 15s title in England with Saracens Women.

== History ==
(Source: US Women's Rugby Foundation)

The history of women's rugby in the United States can be traced back to three teams that existed in 1972 – the Colorado State University Hookers at Fort Collins; the University of Colorado, at Boulder; and the University of Illinois, at Champaign. During the mid-1970s women's teams began to spring up on college campuses across the United States. As those players graduated they went on to set up teams near cities and urban centers. At that time there was only one division for all women's rugby. In 1975, United States Rugby Football Union was formed and contained four territories. At this time the women had their own Board of Directors and followed in parallel USARFU with four territories (East, Midwest, West and Pacific). In 1978, the first Women's National Championships was held. The Chicago Women's Rugby Club in Chicago, Illinois hosted this event. The winner of that championship was Portland, Maine.

=== 1980s–1997 ===
In 1985, the first semblance of a national team was formed. An ‘invitation-only’ team was put together and made up of, arguably, the top women playing the game at the time. The team was named WIVERN and toured throughout England and France. The team finished the tour undefeated. Many of these players went on to be selected for the 1991 World Cup Team.

In 1987 the USA women's national team was officially born with their first match against the Canadian women's national team. Although the women were not permitted to wear the Eagle logo, this match was sanctioned by Rugby Canada and USA Rugby. USA and Canada began holding an annual match, which became known as the CanAm series. For ten years the Women Eagles went undefeated in this test series.

In 1990, the women's national team, competing under the name “USA Presidents 15,” traveled to New Zealand to compete in the historic Women's World Rugby Festival. The WNT posted a record of 3–1 with their only loss coming at the hands of New Zealand. In 1991 the first Women's Rugby World Cup was held in Cardiff, Wales. Coached by Beantown's Kevin O’Brien, a Welshman himself, and Minnesota's Chris Leach, a South African the stage was set for the US women to bring home the Cup. Defeating New Zealand in semi-final play, the USA women advanced to the finals where they defeated England. Also in 1991 the first woman was elected to serve on the USARFU Board of Directors. Jamie Jordan was elected Treasurer for the Board.

In 1997, The U23 women's national team was formed. USA Women's National Team Head Coach Franck Boivert appointed Penn State Coach Peter Steinberg to be Head Coach for the U23 Women's National Team program. At an event in the CanAm Series the US Women's National Team celebrated their 10-year anniversary by cheering on the Women's U23 National Team in their first test against Canada.

=== Present ===
The USA Women's National Team XVs finished fourth at Rugby World Cup 2017 in Ireland which earned them automatic qualification to the next World Cup in New Zealand in 2021. In early 2018, the program hired former Women's National Team player Emilie Bydwell to serve as its General Manager of Women's High Performance. Soon after in May, Rob Cain was appointed full-time Head Coach and has since helped lead the program in a new direction.

The Women's National Team Program fields a number of age-grade and development programs including the High School All-Americans (U18), Under-20s, Collegiate All-Americans and USA Selects. All age-grade and development programs are umbrellaed under the national team program and serve as a feeder to the senior Women's Eagles.

== Record ==
=== Overall ===
See List of United States women's national rugby union team matches

Full internationals only

Correct as of April 19, 2026

| Opponent | First game | Played | Won | Drawn | Lost | Win % |
|---|---|---|---|---|---|---|
| Australia | 1997 | 11 | 7 | 1 | 3 | 63.64% |
| Canada | 1987 | 48 | 19 | 0 | 29 | 39.58% |
| England | 1991 | 22 | 1 | 0 | 21 | 4.55% |
| France | 1996 | 14 | 2 | 1 | 11 | 14.29% |
| Fiji | 2025 | 1 | 1 | 0 | 0 | 100% |
| Ireland | 1994 | 9 | 5 | 0 | 4 | 55.56% |
| Italy | 2012 | 4 | 2 | 0 | 2 | 50% |
| Japan | 1994 | 5 | 3 | 1 | 1 | 60% |
| Kazakhstan | 2010 | 2 | 2 | 0 | 0 | 100% |
| Netherlands | 1990 | 3 | 3 | 0 | 0 | 100% |
| New Zealand | 1990 | 17 | 1 | 0 | 16 | 5.88% |
| Russia | 1998 | 1 | 1 | 0 | 0 | 100% |
| Samoa | 2023 | 1 | 1 | 0 | 0 | 100% |
| Scotland | 1998 | 7 | 5 | 0 | 2 | 71.43% |
| South Africa | 2009 | 6 | 5 | 0 | 1 | 83.33% |
| Soviet Union | 1990 | 2 | 2 | 0 | 0 | 100% |
| Spain | 1998 | 4 | 4 | 0 | 0 | 100% |
| Sweden | 1994 | 1 | 1 | 0 | 0 | 100% |
| Wales | 1993 | 4 | 4 | 0 | 0 | 100% |
| Total | 1987 | 161 | 68 | 3 | 90 | 42.24% |

=== Rugby World Cup ===
Rugby World Cup
| Year | Round | Pld | W | D | L | PF | PA | Squad |
|---|---|---|---|---|---|---|---|---|
| (Wales) 1991 | Champions | 4 | 4 | 0 | 0 | 79 | 6 | Squad |
| (Scotland) 1994 | Runners-up | 5 | 4 | 0 | 1 | 387 | 53 | Squad |
| (Netherlands) 1998 | Runners-up | 5 | 4 | 0 | 1 | 200 | 76 | Squad |
| (Spain) 2002 | 7th place | 4 | 2 | 0 | 2 | 124 | 43 | Squad |
| (Canada) 2006 | 5th place | 5 | 4 | 0 | 1 | 87 | 47 | Squad |
| (England) 2010 | 5th place | 5 | 3 | 0 | 2 | 136 | 82 | Squad |
| (France) 2014 | 6th place | 5 | 2 | 0 | 3 | 95 | 139 | Squad |
| (Republic of Ireland) 2017 | 4th place | 5 | 2 | 0 | 3 | 128 | 135 | Squad |
| (New Zealand) 2021 | Quarter-final | 4 | 1 | 0 | 3 | 65 | 100 | Squad |
| (England) 2025 | Pool Stage | 3 | 1 | 1 | 1 | 98 | 100 | Squad |
| (Australia) 2029 | Qualified | | | | | | | |
| (United States) 2033 | Automatically Qualified as Hosts | | | | | | | |
| Total | Champions^{†} | 45 | 27 | 1 | 16 | 1399 | 781 | Squad |
Champion Runner-up Third place Fourth place: * Tied placing ^{†} Best placing / Home venue

== Players ==
=== Current squad ===
The United States named their final 32-player squad on July 17 for the 2025 Women's Rugby World Cup in England.

Note: The age and number of caps listed for each player is as of August 22, 2025, the first day of the tournament.

| Player | Position | Date of birth (age) | Caps | Club/province |
|---|---|---|---|---|
| Hope Cooper | Hooker | April 1, 1998 (aged 27) | 0 | (United States) Bay Breakers |
| Paige Stathopoulos | Hooker | August 23, 1993 (aged 31) | 18 | (England) Trailfinders / (United States) Boston Banshees |
| Kathryn Treder | Hooker | March 17, 1996 (aged 29) | 31 | (England) Loughborough Lightning / (United States) Bay Breakers |
| Catie Benson | Prop | February 10, 1992 (aged 33) | 47 | (England) Sale Sharks / (United States) Boston Banshees |
| Charli Jacoby | Prop | October 9, 1989 (aged 35) | 36 | (England) Exeter Chiefs / (Australia) Queensland Reds |
| Maya Learned | Prop | April 8, 1996 (aged 29) | 18 | (United States) Denver Onyx |
| Alivia Leatherman | Prop | August 9, 2002 (aged 23) | 7 | (England) Trailfinders / (United States) Twin Cities Gemini |
| Hope Rogers | Prop | January 7, 1993 (aged 32) | 56 | (England) Exeter Chiefs |
| Keia Mae Sagapolu | Prop | May 12, 2000 (aged 25) | 20 | (England) Leicester Tigers / (Australia) ACT Brumbies |
| Emerson Allen | Second row | May 1, 1999 (aged 26) | 2 | (United States) Twin Cities Gemini |
| Rachel Ehrecke | Second row | December 6, 1999 (aged 25) | 23 | (United States) Denver Onyx |
| Erica Jarrell-Searcy | Second row | February 25, 1999 (aged 26) | 20 | (England) Sale Sharks |
| Hallie Taufo'ou | Second row | May 26, 1994 (aged 31) | 28 | (England) Loughborough Lightning / (United States) Denver Onyx |
| Tahlia Brody | Back row | September 10, 1994 (aged 30) | 20 | (England) Leicester Tigers / (United States) Denver Onyx |
| Rachel Johnson | Back row | February 5, 1991 (aged 34) | 37 | (England) Exeter Chiefs / (United States) Denver Onyx |
| Georgie Perris-Redding | Back row | January 10, 1997 (aged 28) | 16 | (England) Sale Sharks |
| Freda Tafuna | Back row | August 31, 2003 (aged 21) | 14 | (United States) Lindenwood University |
| Kate Zackary (c) | Back row | July 26, 1989 (aged 36) | 46 | (England) Trailfinders |
| Cassidy Bargell | Scrum-half | December 28, 1999 (aged 25) | 9 | (United States) Boston Banshees |
| Olivia Ortiz | Scrum-half | October 23, 1997 (aged 27) | 26 | (England) Sale Sharks |
| Kristin Bitter | Fly-half | February 3, 2001 (aged 24) | 4 | (United States) Denver Onyx |
| McKenzie Hawkins | Fly-half | January 8, 1997 (aged 28) | 26 | (United States) Denver Onyx |
| Gabby Cantorna | Centre | August 2, 1995 (aged 30) | 33 | (England) Exeter Chiefs |
| Joanne Fa'avesi | Centre | February 5, 1992 (aged 33) | 6 | (United States) Denver Onyx |
| Emily Henrich | Centre | November 10, 1999 (aged 25) | 25 | (England) Leicester Tigers / (United States) Boston Banshees |
| Alev Kelter | Centre | March 21, 1991 (aged 34) | 31 | (England) Loughborough Lightning / (United States) Bay Breakers |
| Ilona Maher | Centre | August 12, 1996 (aged 29) | 7 | (England) Bristol Bears / (United States) USA Sevens |
| Erica Coulibaly | Wing | August 26, 2001 (aged 23) | 3 | (United States) Denver Onyx |
| Cheta Emba | Wing | July 16, 1993 (aged 32) | 16 | (United States) Boston Banshees |
| Sariah Ibarra | Wing | September 19, 2005 (aged 19) | 5 | (United States) USA Sevens |
| Lotte Sharp | Wing | January 13, 1995 (aged 30) | 18 | (England) Saracens |
| Bulou Mataitoga | Fullback | April 8, 1994 (aged 31) | 27 | (England) Loughborough Lightning / (United States) Bay Breakers |

=== Notable players ===
Three former Eagles have been inducted into the World Rugby Hall of Fame: Patty Jervey, Phaidra Knight, and Kathy Flores.

Patty Jervey was inducted in 2014. She was the first player to play in five Women's Rugby World Cups. She won the inaugural tournament in 1991 and appeared in the 1994, 1998, 2002 and 2006 editions. She made her Eagles debut in 1989 and has won 40 caps, and scored 178 points.

Phaidra Knight was inducted in 2017. She has been capped 35 times for the Eagles and has appeared at three Women's Rugby World Cups – 2002, 2006 and 2010. She was named USA Rugby Player of the Decade in 2010. Knight also represented the USA Women's Sevens, from 2006 to 2009.

Kathy Flores was inducted in 2022. She represented the Eagles at two Women's Rugby World Cups as a player, winning the tournament in 1991 and featuring again in 1994. Following retirement from playing, she served as the USA national head coach from 2002 to 2011, leading them to two more World Cups – 2006 and 2010.

=== Award winners ===
The following United States players have been recognized at the World Rugby Awards since 2001:

World Rugby Women's 15s Player of the Year
| Year | Nominees | Winners |
|---|---|---|
| 2003 | Kathy Flores | Kathy Flores |

World Rugby 15s Dream Team of the Year
| Year | No. | Players |
|---|---|---|
| 2022 | 1. | Hope Rogers |
| 2024 | 1. | Hope Rogers (2) |

== Coaches ==
| Name | Years |
|---|---|
| Kevin O'Brien | 1991 |
| Franck Boivert | 1994 |
| Martin Gallagher | 2002 |
| Kathy Flores | 2002–2011 |
| Peter Steinberg | 2011–2017 |
| Rob Cain | 2018–2024 |
| Sione Fukofuka | 2024–2025 |
| Jack Hanratty | 2025 |

== Attendance ==
The highest attended matches played in the U.S. involving the U.S. women's national team are:

| Rank | Attendance | Opponent | Date | Venue | Metro area | Ref. |
|---|---|---|---|---|---|---|
| 1 | 15,198 | Fiji | July 19, 2025 | Audi Field | Washington D.C. | |
| 2 | 10,518 | Canada | May 6, 2025 | CPKC Stadium | Kansas City, Mo. | |
| 3 | 2,856 | Japan | April 26, 2025 | Wallis Annenberg Stadium | Los Angeles, Cal. | |

== See also ==
- Women's Elite Rugby – the current women's national semi-professional rugby competition
- Women's Premier League Rugby
- Rugby union in the United States
- Women's international rugby – the most complete listing of all women's international results since 1982
