= Twin Cities Orthopedics Performance Center =

Minnesota Vikings headquarters, including a 6,000-seat outdoor stadium

- TCO Performance Center

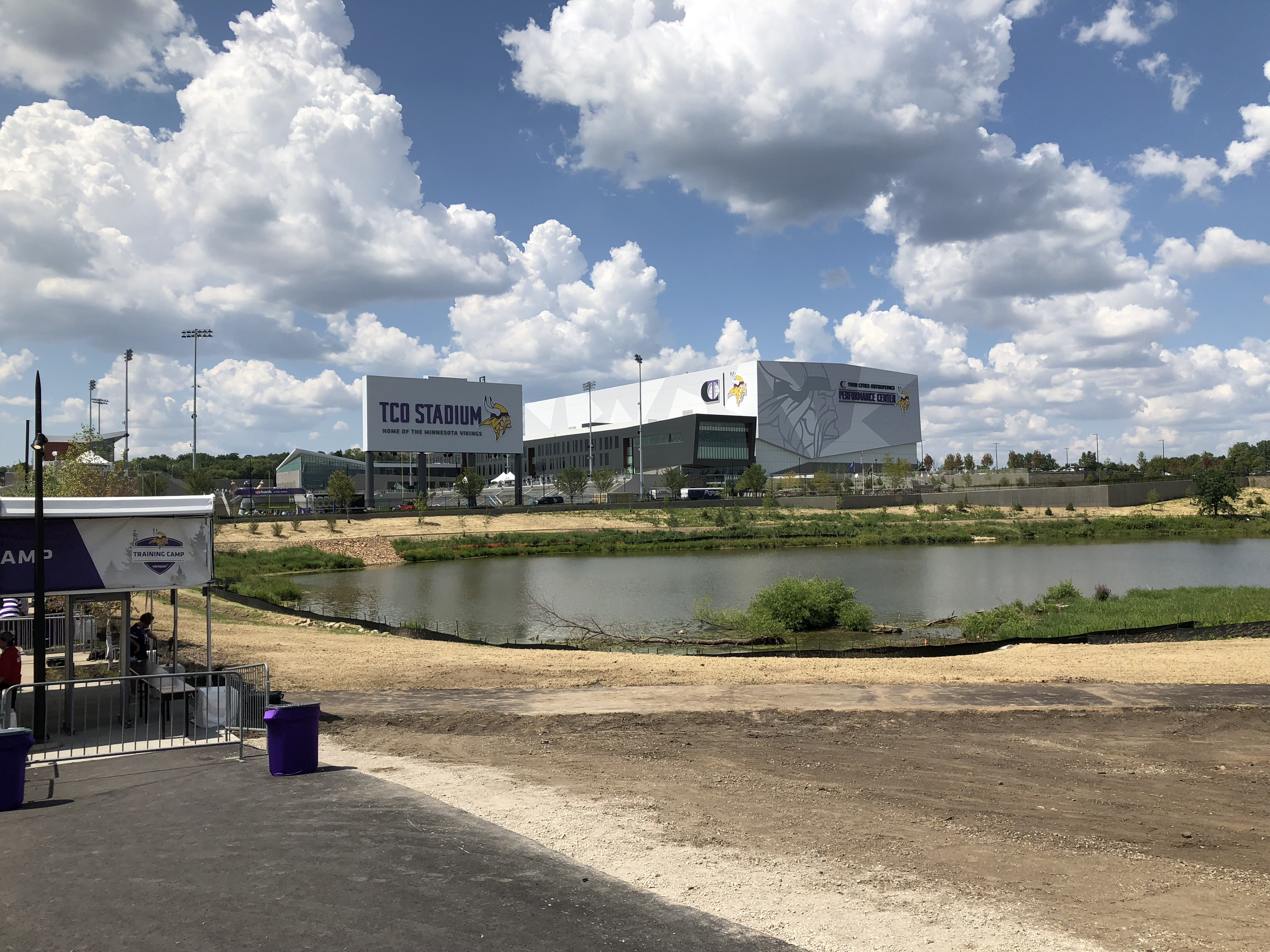

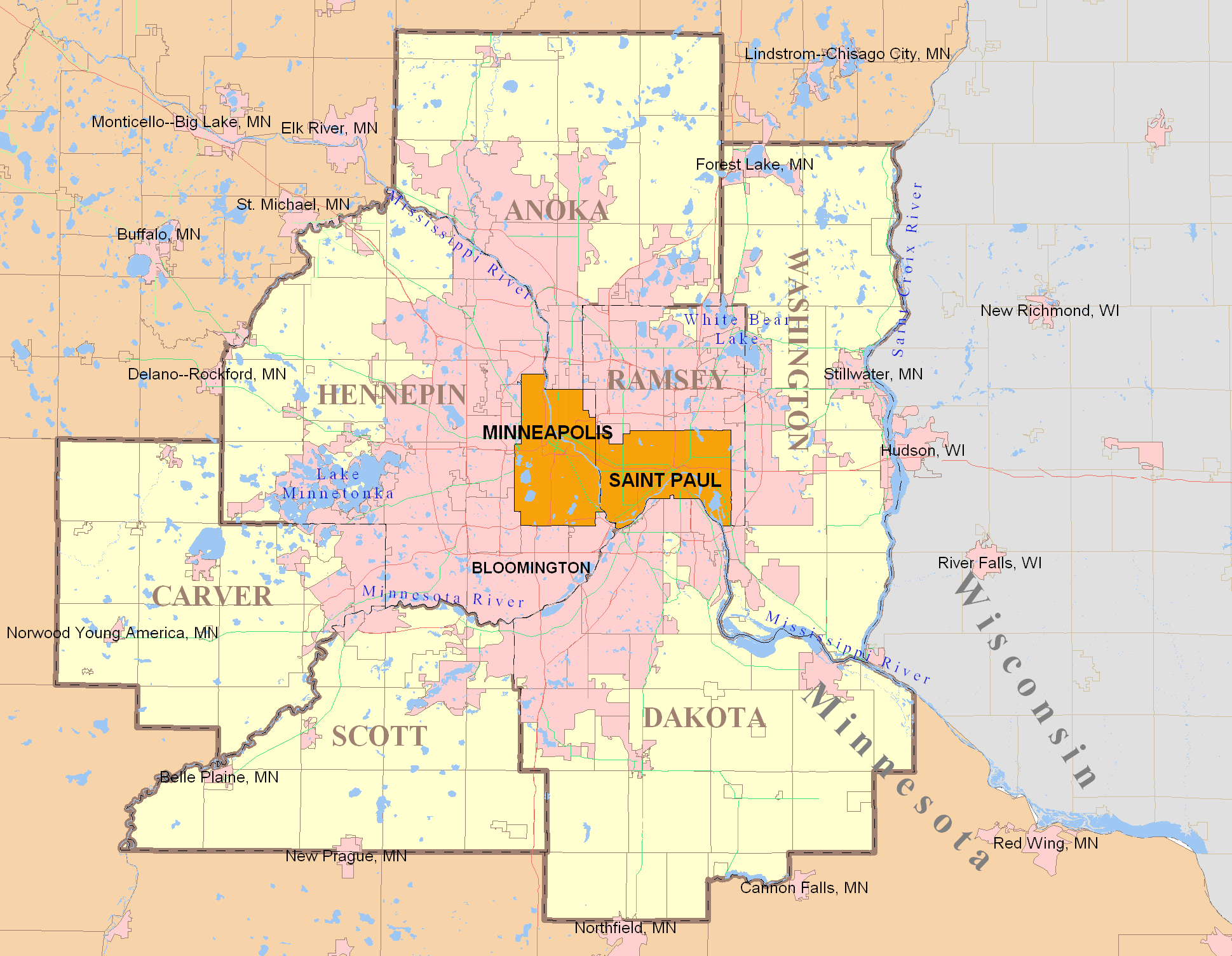
- Location in Minneapolis–Saint Paul Location in Minnesota Location in the United States
- Address: 2600 Vikings Circle
- Location: Eagan, Minnesota
- Coordinates: 44.8613°N 93.1166°W
- Owner: Minnesota Vikings
- Operator: Minnesota Vikings
- Capacity: 6,000
- Surface: Artificial turf

Construction
- Groundbreaking: August 2, 2016; 10 years ago
- Opened: June 15, 2018; 8 years ago
- Cost: $90 million
- Architect: Crawford Architects
- General contractor: Kraus Anderson

Tenants
- Minnesota Vikings practice facility (NFL) (2018–present); Minnesota Aurora FC (USLW) (2022–present)

Twin Cities Orthopedics Performance Center (commonly referred to as TCO Performance Center) is a 40-acre (16 ha) sports complex located in Eagan, Minnesota. Its main use is as the Minnesota Vikings' headquarters and practice facility. The facility includes a 6,000-seat outdoor stadium known as TCO Stadium, in addition to a fully-enclosed indoor practice field and several outdoor natural and synthetic turf practice fields. TCO Performance Center also features player position meeting rooms and team auditorium; expanded locker room, weight room and equipment facilities. Along with state of the art cardiovascular and specialized speed rooms, a hydrotherapy room, and post-workout recovery rooms; a broadcast studio and media center; and administrative offices for Vikings staff. It also serves as the location of the Vikings Museum and one of three team stores in the Twin Cities area.

== History ==
Beginning in 1981, the Vikings headquarters was located at Eden Prairie, Minnesota's Winter Park. The Vikings eventually outgrew Winter Park, which was lacking in office space and featured deteriorating training amenities. In August 2015, the Vikings signed a purchase agreement to buy a 185-acre site in Eagan, Minnesota which was once the headquarters of Northwest Airlines. Ground was broken on the new Twin Cities Orthopedics Performance Center on August 2, 2016. On that same day, the Vikings announced a 20-year partnership with Twin Cities Orthopedics, which includes naming rights. No financial terms were disclosed. The team moved into the facility in early 2018, with an official ribbon-cutting taking place on June 15, 2018.

On July 18, 2017, the Vikings announced that that year's training camp would be the Vikings' last in Mankato, Minnesota. Minnesota State University, Mankato had hosted Vikings training camp for over 50 years. Beginning with summer 2018, Vikings training camp is held at TCO Performance Center. Approximately 5,000 fans per day attend training camp which typically takes place from late July to mid-August.

== TCO Stadium ==
The on-site 6,000-seat stadium is expandable to 10,000 seats. Each year, the stadium hosts local high school football games in what's known as the Vikings Prep Spotlight series. The ability to host high school and youth football events at the facility was a primary focus in the design of the campus. In addition to football, the stadium has hosted soccer and lacrosse events.

In 2022, it was announced that the Minnesota Aurora FC, a new pre-professional women's soccer team, would play its games at TCO Stadium. On July 23, 2022, the Aurora hosted South Georgia Tormenta FC in the USL W League championship game at TCO Stadium, losing by a score of 2–1. The match drew a record crowd of 6,489.

On September 3, 2026, a section of railing at TCO Stadium collapsed following a high school football game between Cretin-Derham Hall and St. Thomas Academy, sending approximately 20 to 30 Cretin-Derham Hall students four to six feet onto the field. Several students were treated by emergency medical personnel, with one hospitalized and later discharged. Stadium officials subsequently inspected the stadium’s railings and began reviewing measures to prevent similar incidents.
