= 2017–18 Premier 15s =

- Countries: England
- Date: 16 September 2017 – 29 April 2018
- Champions: Saracens Women (1st title)
- Runners-up: Harlequins Ladies
- Matches played: 93
- Top point scorer: (England) Abigail Dow (Wasps) (98 points)
- Top try scorer: (England) Shaunagh Brown (Harlequins) (17 tries)

Official website
- www.premier15s.com

The 2017–18 Premier 15s was the inaugural season for the Premier 15s and began on 16 September 2017. Saracens Women won the inaugural Championship after defeating Harlequins Ladies in their final 24–20.

== Teams ==
Saracens Women
Harlequins Ladies
Loughborough Lightning
Wasps Ladies
Gloucester-Hartpury
Bristol Bears Women
Richmond Women
Darlington Mowden Park Sharks
Firwood Waterloo Ladies
Worcester Valkyries

== Table ==
2017–18 Premier 15s Table
| Pos | Team | Pld | W | D | L | PF | PA | PD | TB | LB | Pts | Qualification |
|---|---|---|---|---|---|---|---|---|---|---|---|---|
| 1 | Saracens Women (CH) | 18 | 15 | 1 | 2 | 648 | 193 | +455 | 15 | 2 | 79 | Play-off place |
| 2 | Harlequins Ladies (RU) | 18 | 15 | 0 | 3 | 674 | 289 | +385 | 14 | 2 | 76 | Play-off place |
| 3 | Wasps Ladies (SF) | 18 | 13 | 0 | 5 | 534 | 254 | +280 | 14 | 3 | 69 | Play-off place |
| 4 | Gloucester-Hartpury (SF) | 18 | 11 | 1 | 6 | 572 | 380 | +192 | 14 | 0 | 60 | Play-off place |
| 5 | Loughborough Lightning | 18 | 10 | 1 | 7 | 383 | 368 | +15 | 9 | 2 | 53 | |
| 6 | Bristol Bears Women | 18 | 9 | 0 | 9 | 481 | 343 | +138 | 8 | 2 | 46 | |
| 7 | Richmond Women | 18 | 7 | 1 | 10 | 264 | 435 | −171 | 5 | 1 | 31 (Note: Richmond were deducted 5 points) | |
| 8 | Darlington Mowden Park Sharks | 18 | 4 | 1 | 13 | 284 | 413 | −129 | 5 | 3 | 26 | |
| 9 | Firwood Waterloo Ladies | 18 | 2 | 2 | 14 | 223 | 495 | −272 | 1 | 3 | 16 | |
| 10 | Worcester Valkyries | 18 | 0 | 1 | 17 | 97 | 990 | −893 | 0 | 0 | 2 | |

Source: RFU

== Regular season ==
=== Round 1 ===
16 September 2017

| Darlington Mowden Park Sharks | 3–32 | Gloucester-Hartpury (1 BP) |

16 September 2017

| Firwood Waterloo Ladies | 13–22 | Saracens Women (1 BP) |

16 September 2017

| (1 BP) Loughborough Lightning | 46–12 | Worcester Valkyries |

16 September 2017

| (2 BP) Wasps Ladies | 32–38 | Harlequins Ladies (1 BP) |

17 September 2017

| (2 BP) Bristol Bears Women | 24––31 | Richmond Women (1 BP) |

=== Round 2 ===
23 September 2017

| (1 BP) Gloucester-Hartpury | 26–22 | Wasps Ladies (2 BP) |

23 September 2017

| (1 BP) Harlequins Ladies | 39–18 | Firwood Waterloo Ladies |

23 September 2017

| (1 BP) Richmond Women | 27–10 | Darlington Mowden Park Sharks |

23 September 2017

| Worcester Valkyries | 10–62 | Bristol Bears Women (1 BP) |

24 September 2017

| (1 BP) Saracens Women | 34–20 | Loughborough Lightning |

=== Round 3 ===
30 September 2017

| (2 BP) Darlington Mowden Park Sharks | 28–32 | Wasps Ladies (1 BP) |

30 September 2017

| (1 BP) Firwood Waterloo Ladies | 16–20 | Bristol Bears Women |

30 September 2017

| (1 BP) Gloucester-Hartpury | 29–0 | Richmond Women |

30 September 2017

| Loughborough Lightning | 19–40 | Harlequins Ladies (1 BP) |

30 September 2017

| Worcester Valkyries | 0–74 | Saracens Women (1 BP) |

=== Round 4 ===
7 October 2017

| (1 BP) Bristol Bears Women | 28–20 | Gloucester-Hartpury (1 BP) |

7 October 2017

| (1 BP) Harlequins Ladies | 26–10 | Darlington Mowden Park Sharks |

7 October 2017

| (1 BP) Loughborough Lightning | 30–19 | Firwood Waterloo Ladies |

7 October 2017

| (1 BP) Richmond Women | 48–12 | Worcester Valkyries |

7 October 2017

| (1 BP) Saracens Women | 30–0 | Wasps Ladies |

=== Round 5 ===
21 October 2017

| Firwood Waterloo Ladies | 0–0 | Darlington Mowden Park Sharks |

21 October 2017

| (1 BP) Harlequins Ladies | 49–12 | Bristol Bears Women |

21 October 2017

| Richmond Women | 0–29 | Saracens Women (1 BP) |

21 October 2017

| (1 BP) Wasps Ladies | 45–5 | Loughborough Lightning |

21 October 2017

| Worcester Valkyries | 0–43 | Gloucester-Hartpury (1 BP) |

=== Round 6 ===
28 October 2017

| Bristol Bears Women | 5–17 | Darlington Mowden Park Sharks |

28 October 2017

| Darlington Mowden Park Sharks | 16–12 | Loughborough Lightning (1 BP) |

28 October 2017

| (1 BP) Firwood Waterloo Ladies | 12–15 | Richmond Women |

28 October 2017

| Gloucester-Hartpury | 5–33 | Saracens Women (1 BP) |

28 October 2017

| Worcester Valkyries | 0–71 | Harlequins Ladies (1 BP) |

=== Round 7 ===
4 November 2017

| (1 BP) Darlington Mowden Park Sharks | 39–5 | Worcester Valkyries |

4 November 2017

| (1 BP) Harlequins Ladies | 39–12 | Gloucester-Hartpury |

4 November 2017

| (1 BP) Loughborough Lightning | 27–15 | Richmond Women |

4 November 2017

| (1 BP) Saracens Women | 29–12 | Bristol Bears Women |

4 November 2017

| (1 BP) Wasps Ladies | 31–3 | Firwood Waterloo Ladies |

=== Round 8 ===
11 November 2017

| (1 BP) Bristol Bears Women | 8–12 | Loughborough Lightning |

11 November 2017

| (1 BP) Gloucester-Hartpury | 29–22 | Firwood Waterloo Ladies (2 BP) |

11 November 2017

| Richmond Women | 5–43 | Harlequins Ladies (1 BP) |

11 November 2017

| (1 BP) Saracens Women | 44–19 | Darlington Mowden Park Sharks |

11 November 2017

| Worcester Valkyries | 5–51 | Wasps Ladies (1 BP) |

=== Round 9 ===
2 December 2017

| (1 BP) Loughborough Lightning | 43–33 | Gloucester-Hartpury (1 BP) |

2 December 2017

| Firwood Waterloo Ladies | 12–12 | Worcester Valkyries |

2 December 2017

| Darlington Mowden Park Sharks | 3–26 | Bristol Bears Women (1 BP) |

3 December 2017

| Richmond Women | 0–44 | Wasps Ladies (1 BP) |

3 December 2017

| Harlequins Ladies | 19–28 | Saracens Women (1 BP) |

=== Round 10 ===
9 December 2017

| (1 BP) Gloucester-Hartpury | 24–38 | Darlington Mowden Park Sharks (1 BP) |

9 December 2017

| (1 BP) Harlequins Ladies | 27–8 | Wasps Ladies |

9 December 2017

| (1 BP) Saracens Women | 45–6 | Firwood Waterloo Ladies |

10 December 2017

| Richmond Women | 5–32 | Bristol Bears Women (1 BP) |

6 January 2018

| Worcester Valkyries | 7–36 | Loughborough Lightning (1 BP) |

=== Round 11 ===
16 December 2017

| (1 BP) Bristol Bears Women | 89–0 | Worcester Valkyries |

16 December 2017

| Firwood Waterloo Ladies | 12–51 | Harlequins Ladies (1 BP) |

16 December 2017

| Loughborough Lightning | 7–34 | Saracens Women (1 BP) |

16 December 2017

| (1 BP) Wasps Ladies | 37–17 | Firwood Waterloo Ladies |

27 January 2018

| (1 BP) Darlington Mowden Park Sharks | 10–15 | Richmond Women |

=== Round 12 ===
13 January 2018

| (1 BP) Bristol Bears Women | 59–7 | Firwood Waterloo Ladies |

13 January 2018

| Harlequins Ladies | 17–10 | Loughborough Lightning (1 BP) |

13 January 2018

| (1 BP) Saracens Women | 105–0 | Worcester Valkyries |

13 January 2018

| (1 BP) Wasps Ladies | 31–10 | Darlington Mowden Park Sharks |

14 January 2018

| Richmond Women | 15–37 | Gloucester-Hartpury (1 BP) |

=== Round 13 ===
20 January 2018

| Firwood Waterloo Ladies | 0–29 | Loughborough Lightning |

20 January 2018

| (1 BP) Gloucester-Hartpury | 34–17 | Bristol Bears Women |

20 January 2018

| Wasps Ladies | 5–0 | Saracens Women (1 BP) |

20 January 2018

| Worcester Valkyries | 5–29 | Richmond Women (1 BP) |

10 February 2018

| (1 BP) Darlington Mowden Park Sharks | 24–31 | Harlequins Ladies (1 BP) |

=== Round 14 ===
3 February 2018

| Bristol Bears Women | 13–12 | Harlequins Ladies (1 BP) |

3 February 2018

| Darlington Mowden Park Sharks | 10–18 | Firwood Waterloo Ladies |

3 February 2018

| (1 BP) Gloucester-Hartpury | 80–0 | Worcester Valkyries |

3 February 2018

| (1 BP) Loughborough Lightning | 26–20 | Wasps Ladies (2 BP) |

3 February 2018

| (1 BP) Saracens Women | 41–0 | Richmond Women |

=== Round 15 ===
17 February 2018

| (1 BP) Harlequins Ladies | 80–7 | Worcester Valkyries |

17 February 2018

| Loughborough Lightning | 21–15 | Darlington Mowden Park Sharks (1 BP) |

17 February 2018

| (1 BP) Saracens Women | 29–29 | Gloucester-Hartpury (1 BP) |

17 February 2018

| (1 BP) Wasps Ladies | 26–12 | Bristol Bears Women |

18 February 2018

| (1 BP) Richmond Women | 20–12 | Firwood Waterloo |

=== Round 16 ===
3 March 2018

| (1 BP) Gloucester-Hartpury | 40–36 | Harlequin Ladies (2 BP) |

18 March 2018

| Richmond Women | 10–10 | Loughborough Lightning |

30 March 2018

| Bristol Bears Women | 19–29 | Saracens Women (1 BP) |
| | Report |

31 March 2018

| Firwood Waterloo Ladies | 0–34 | Wasps Ladies (1 BP) |
| | Report |

31 March 2018

| Worcester Valkyries | 12–27 | Darlington Mowden Park Sharks (1 BP) |
| | Report |

=== Round 17 ===
10 March 2018

| Darlington Mowden Park Sharks | 5–13 | Saracens Women |

10 March 2018

| Firwood Waterloo Ladies | 10–44 | Gloucester-Hartpury (1 BP) |

10 March 2018

| Harlequins Ladies | 14–12 | Richmond Women (1 BP) |

10 March 2018

| (1 BP) Loughborough Lightning | 24–7 | Bristol Bears Women |

10 March 2018

| (1 BP) Wasps Ladies | 55–5 | Worcester Valkyries |

=== Round 18 ===
24 March 2018

| (1 BP) Bristol Bears Women | 36–19 | Darlington Mowden Park Sharks |

24 March 2018

| (1 BP) Gloucester-Hartpury | 36–8 | Loughborougb Lightning |

24 March 2018

| (2 BP) Saracens Women | 29–32 | Harlequins Ladies (1 BP) |

24 March 2018

| (1 BP) Wasps Ladies | 44–17 | Richmond Women |
| | Report |

24 March 2018

| Worcester Valkyries | 5–43 | Firwood Waterloo Ladies (1 BP) |
| | Report |

== Play-offs ==
| Semifinals | | | | | Final |
| 1 | Saracens Women | 62 | 45 | 107 |
| 4 | Gloucester-Hartpury | 0 | 26 | 26 |
| | | | | | 1 | Saracens Women | 24 |
| | | | | | 2 | Harlequins Ladies | 20 |
| 2 | Harlequins Ladies | 25 | 22 | 47 |
| 3 | Wasps Ladies | 19 | 7 | 26 |

=== Semi-finals ===
==== 1st leg ====
7 April 2018

| Gloucester-Hartpury | 0–62 | Saracens Women |
| | Report |

7 April 2018

| Wasps Ladies | 19–25 | Harlequins Ladies |
| | Report |

==== 2nd leg ====
14 April 2018

| Saracens Women | 45–26 | Gloucester-Hartpury |
| | Report |

14 April 2018

| Harlequins Ladies | 22–7 | Wasps Ladies |
| | Report |

=== Final ===
29 April 2018
15:00

| Saracens Women | 24–20 | Harlequins Ladies |
| Try: Martinez Gion 4' m Clapp 27' c Mackinder 38' m Botterman 53' c Con: Rowland (2/4) 28', 54' | Report | Try: Myers 40+1' m Breach 48' m McCormack 66' c Con: Green (1/3) 67'; Pen: Green (1/1) 7' |

Trailfinders Sports Ground
Attendance: 2,057
Referee: Sara Cox

Team details

| FB | 15 | (Denmark) Nina Vistisen |
| RW | 14 | (England) Garnet Mackinder |
| OC | 13 | (England) Lauren Cattell |
| IC | 12 | (England) Helena Rowland |
| LW | 11 | (England) Lotte Clapp (c) |
| FH | 10 | (England) Zoe Harrison |
| SH | 9 | (England) Georgina Gulliver |
| N8 | 8 | (England) Poppy Cleall | Temporarily suspended |
| OF | 7 | (England) Marlie Packer |
| BF | 6 | (England) Bryony Cleall | | (substituted off) 60' |
| RL | 5 | (Netherlands) Tess Wijmans | | (substituted off) 53' |
| LL | 4 | (England) Sonia Green |
| TP | 3 | (Netherlands) Sam Martinez Gion |
| HK | 2 | (Wales) Katharine Evans | | (substituted off) 73' |
| LP | 1 | (England) Hannah Botterman |
Substitutions:
| HK | 16 | (England) May Campbell | | (substituted in) 73' |
| PR | 17 | (England) Sarah Barber |
| LK | 18 | (England) Rosie Galligan | | (substituted in) 53' |
| FL | 19 | (Italy) Valeria Fedrighi | | (substituted in) 60' |
| SH | 20 | (England) Ella Wyrwas |
| CE | 21 | (England) Cara Wardle |
| WG | 22 | (England) Emma Uren |
Coach:
(England) Rob Cain

| FB | 15 | (United States) Jess Wooden |
| RW | 14 | (England) Holly Myers |
| OC | 13 | (England) Fiona Pocock |
| IC | 12 | (England) Rachael Burford (c) |
| LW | 11 | (England) Natasha Bradshaw | (substituted off) 41' |
| FH | 10 | (England) Ellie Green |
| SH | 9 | (England) Leanne Riley |
| N8 | 8 | (England) Fiona Fletcher |
| OF | 7 | (Scotland) Deborah McCormack |
| BF | 6 | (England) Shaunagh Brown |
| RL | 5 | (England) Abbie Scott |
| LL | 4 | (England) Zoe Saynor |
| TP | 3 | (England) Chloe Edwards |
| HK | 2 | (England) Davinia Catlin |
| LP | 1 | (England) Victoria Cornborough |
Substitutions:
| PR | 16 | (Sweden) Tove Viksten |
| FL | 17 | (England) Ashleigh Greenslade |
| FL | 18 | (England) Alex Hardy |
| N8 | 19 | (England) Samantha McCarthy |
| SH | 20 | (England) Bobbie Haywood |
| WG | 21 | (England) Jess Breach | (substituted in) 41' |
| CE | 22 | (England) Stacey White |
Coach:
| (England) Gary Street | | | (Scotland) Karen Findlay |

Player of the Match:
(England) Marlie Packer (Saracens Women)
