= Saracens Women =

Rugby union club in London

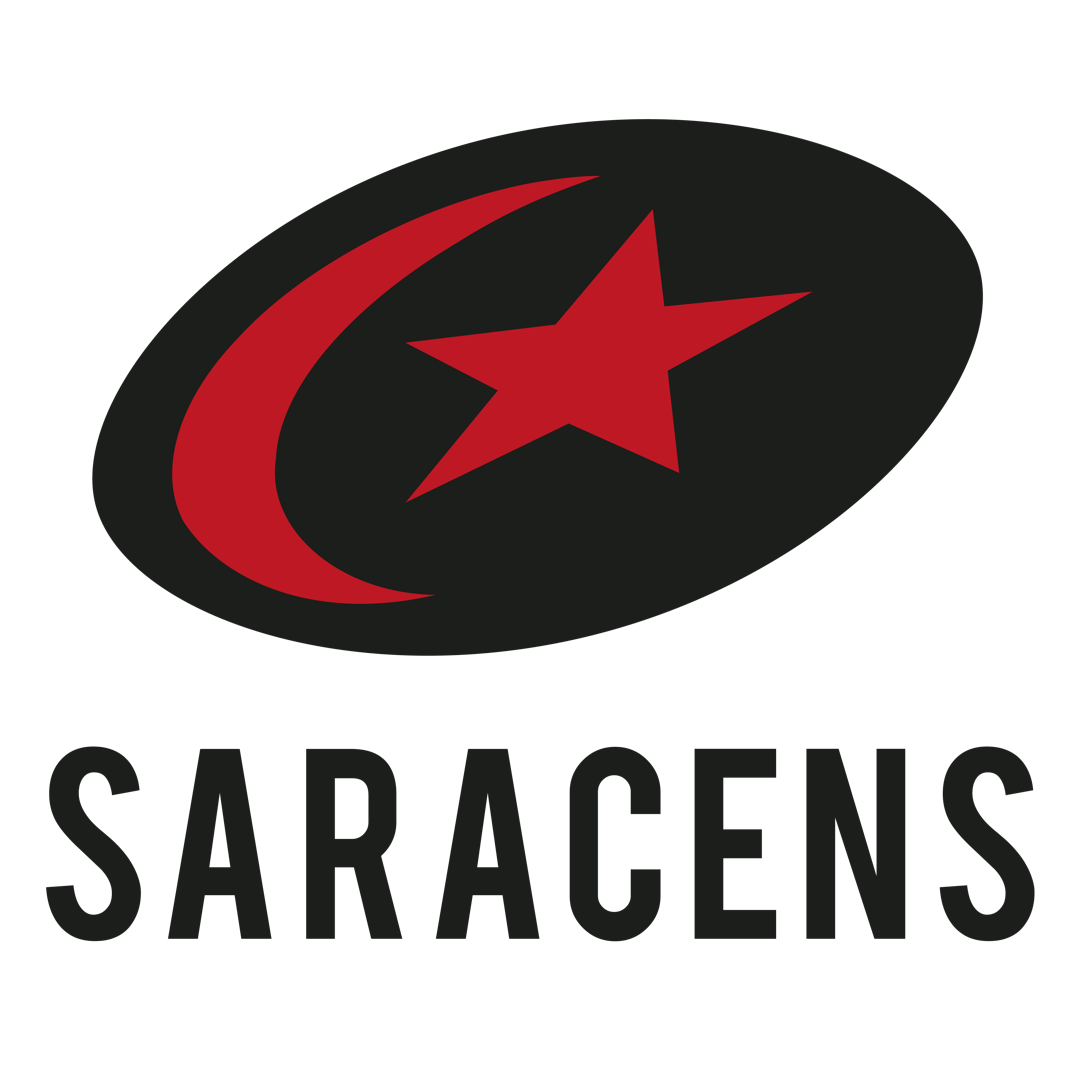
- Full name: Saracens Women
- Union: Middlesex RFU
- Nickname(s): Sarries, Women in Black, Wolf Pack, Fez Girls
- Emblem: Star and crescent
- Founded: 1989; 37 years ago
- Location: Hendon, Greater London, England
- Ground: StoneX Stadium (Note: Saracens also operate a ground-share agreement with Tottenham Hotspur, to play one showpiece home fixture per season, known as The Showdown, at the Tottenham Hotspur Stadium.) (Capacity: 10,500 (Note: StoneX Stadium capacity can be increased up to 15,000 with temporary seating.))
- Chairman: Neil Golding
- CEO: Ed Coetzee
- Director of Rugby: Alex Austerberry
- Coach: Lewis Sones
- Captain(s): May Campbell; Zoe Harrison
- Most appearances: Sonia Green; 329 (All Competitions)
- League: Premiership Women's Rugby
- 2025–26: 2nd of 9 (champions in play-offs)
1st kit	2nd kit

Largest win
- Saracens 105–0 Worcester Valkyries (Barnet Copthall, London, England); 13 January 2018

Largest defeat
- Saracens 7–53 Gloucester-Hartpury (Barnet Copthall, London, England); 10 December 2022

Official website
- saracens.com
- Current season

Saracens Women (/ˈsærəsənz/) are an English women's rugby union club based in Hendon, London. They were established in 1989, and currently play in Premiership Women's Rugby (PWR) and the PWR Cup, the top-level competitions of women's rugby in the country.

Saracens are one of the most successful women's teams in English domestic rugby union history. They have earned a total of 16 top-flight league titles – most recently in the 2025–26 season. In top-tier domestic cup competitions, they have won an additional 12 titles – most recently in the 2025–26 season.

The team also serves as the women's branch of men's Premiership club Saracens.

== History ==
Saracens Women were originally founded in 1989 by a group of nine players – which included England internationals Emma Mitchell, Janis Ross and Sam Robson, and Wales internationals Amanda Bennett and Liza Burgess – who had identified a need for another women's rugby club in north London. The founding members gained approval to establish the team, after agreeing to assist with the commercial operations of the Saracens men's team, who had just been promoted into the top flight for the 1989–90 season. In their debut season, they won the second division and achieved promotion to the Women's Premiership for the 1990–91 season. The team then claimed their first silverware at the national sevens tournament in 1990, and earned a total of 17 trophies over the ensuing decade, including domestic trebles in 1993 and 1998.

Upon entering the new millennium, Saracens Women were crowned Premiership champions in 2000, before new coaching staff were appointed in 2001, headed by former Saracens men's player Lee Adamson and club co-founder Amanda Bennett. Adamson held both coaching and administrative positions at Saracens, until he departed in 2007 to coach the Scotland women's national rugby union team. The team won the league again in 2002, under the captaincy of England international Claire Frost, and then achieved a sequence of four consecutive titles between 2006 and 2009. Throughout those four years, Saracens remained unbeaten in the competition – a feat not achieved before or since at the top level of English women's rugby. Prominent players during this period included England's most capped hooker, Amy Garnett, and flanker Maggie Alphonsi, who played her entire career at Saracens and was later named a Member of the Order of the British Empire for services to rugby.

Off the back of this dominant spell, Saracens Women went five years without silverware, recording three second-place finishes in the league. In 2014, Rob Cain was installed as head coach, and the club proceeded to achieve a league and cup double in 2015. Cain continued as head coach through to the launch of the Premier 15s, after which he left to take the helm of the United States women's national rugby union team in 2018. Saracens secured the 2017–18 Premier 15s title, following a season notable for the breakthrough of a new generation of future England internationals who graduated through the club's academy pathway via Welwyn RFC, including prop Hannah Botterman, fly-half Zoe Harrison, centre Helena Rowland and scrum-half Ella Wyrwas.

Led by new head coach Alex Austerberry and captain Lotte Clapp, Saracens Women cemented themselves as the dominant team in the Premier 15s, which operated as the highest level of women's domestic rugby union competition in England between 2017 and 2023, until it was rebranded as Premiership Women's Rugby. During this period, the club won the title in 2018, 2019 and 2022, while also achieving five consecutive first-place finishes in the regular season league tables. In September 2019, Saracens also announced that it would double its financial investment in the women's team, in addition to increasing alignment with the resources attached to the men's squad.

Until 2014, Saracens Women played their home games at Bramley Sports Ground in Enfield, London, and occasionally at Vicarage Road – the home of Watford FC – when the Saracens men, to whom they are affiliated, moved there in 1997. Subsequently, they reached an agreement to play home matches at the men's home ground, StoneX Stadium, in Hendon. This ground continues to be their home ground for Premiership Women's Rugby fixtures. Starting in 2026, Saracens Women would also play one game per season at Tottenham Hotspur Stadium, as part of The Showdown.

Historically, the club has held rivalries with fellow London sides Richmond and Wasps. In more recent years, their main rivals have been Harlequins, with the two teams contesting three consecutive Premier 15s finals between 2018 and 2021. Since the 2020–21 season, they have competed in an annual showpiece match, known as The London Derby (previously titled The Duel). This fixture is notable for holding the attendance record for a Saracens women's home game, drawing a crowd of 3,733 supporters on 2 November 2025.

== Club honours ==
=== Saracens Women ===
- Women's Premiership / RFUW Premiership
  - Champions: (12) 1992–93, 1993–94, 1995–96, 1997–98, 1998–99, 1999–00, 2001–02, 2005–06, 2006–07, 2007–08, 2008–09, 2014–15
  - Runners–up: (9) 1990–91, 1991–92, 1994–95, 1996–97, 2003–04, 2009–10, 2011–12, 2013–14, 2015–16
- Premier 15s / Premiership Women's Rugby
  - Champions: (4) 2017–18, 2018–19, 2021–22, 2025–26
  - Runners–up: (2) 2020–21, 2024–25
- National Cup
  - Champions: (9) 1990–91, 1992–93, 1995–96, 1996–97, 1997–98, 1998–99, 2002–03, 2007–08, 2014–15
  - Runners–up: (5) 1991–92, 1993–94, 2003–04, 2004–05, 2015–16
- PWR Cup
  - Champions: (2) 2023–24, 2025–26
  - Runners–up: (2) 2022–23, 2026–27

=== Saracens Women Reserves ===
- Women's Premiership 2 / Championship South
  - Champions: (2) 2003–04, 2012–13
  - Runners–up: (4) 2004–05, 2011–12, 2013–14, 2014–15
- Premier 15s Development League
  - Champions: (2) 2017–18, 2018–19

=== Saracens Women 7s ===
- National 7s
  - Champions: (8) 1990, 1991, 1993, 1994, 1998, 1999, 2003, 2005
  - Runners–up: (TBC)
- Singha Premiership 7s
  - Champions: (1) 2016

== Current squad ==
The Saracens Women senior squad for the 2026–27 season is:

Note: Flags indicate national union under World Rugby eligibility rules. Players may hold more than one non-World Rugby nationality.

Player	Position	Union
**May Campbell** (Note: Players marked A1 are jointly contracted with the RFU, via full-time England senior contracts.)	Hooker	England
**Bryony Field**	Hooker	England
Morgan Freeman	Hooker	United States
Daisy Fitzgerald	Hooker	England
Carmen Tremelling	Hooker	England
**Kelsey Clifford**	Prop	England
**Liz Crake**	Prop	England
Chloe Flanagan	Prop	England
Akina Gondwe	Prop	England
Kaylee McHugh	Prop	Scotland
**Donna Rose** (Note: Players marked A2 are jointly contracted with the WRU, via full-time Wales senior contracts.)	Prop	Wales
Ruby Ross	Prop	England
**Georgia Evans**	Lock	Wales
**Louise McMillan**	Lock	Scotland
Jemima Moss	Lock	England
Sophie Tansley	Lock	England
**Roshini Turner**	Lock	(Hong Kong) Hong Kong
Jodie Verghese	Lock	England
Issy Winter	Lock	England
Joia Bennett	Back row	England
**Poppy Cleall**	Back row	England
Leila Crick	Back row	England
**Sophie de Goede**	Back row	Canada
Erin Delea	Back row	England
Lucy Lawford-Wilby	Back row	England
Licia MacCutchan	Back row	England
Sydney Mead	Back row	Wales
**Julia Omokhuale**	Back row	Canada
**Gabby Senft**	Back row	Canada
Jess Taylor	Back row	England
Charlotte Wright-Haley	Back row	England

Player	Position	Union
**Olivia Apps**	Scrum-half	Canada
May Goulding	Scrum-half	Ireland
Maisy Herbert	Scrum-half	England
Tori Sellors	Scrum-half	England
**Ella Wyrwas**	Scrum-half	England
**Zoe Harrison**	Fly-half	England
Amelia MacDougall	Fly-half	England
Lavinia Natui	Fly-half	England
Macey Twine	Fly-half	England
**Sophie Bridger**	Centre	England
**Alysha Corrigan**	Centre	Canada
**Sydney Gregson**	Centre	England
Emma Hardy	Centre	England
Ellie Boatman	Wing	England
**Jess Breach**	Wing	England
**Paige Farries**	Wing	Canada
Chantelle Miell	Wing	England
**Lotte Sharp** (cc)	Wing	United States
**Amelia Tutt**	Wing	Wales
Beth Wilcock	Wing	England
Ellie Cunningham	Fullback	England
Jemma-Jo Linkins	Fullback	England
**Sarah McKenna**	Fullback	England

Note: Players listed in bold have received at least one senior international test cap.

== Club staff ==
The current Saracens senior management and coaching staff, as of the 2026–27 season, is as follows:

Coaches
Role	Name
Director of Rugby / Head Coach	(England) Alex Austerberry
Senior Assistant Coach	(England) Lewis Sones
Attack Coach	(France) Kévin Rouet
Forwards / Defence Coach	(England) Mouritz Botha
Scrum Coach	(England) Neil Harris
Youth Pathway Lead	(England) Niamh McHugh
Youth Academy Coach	(England) Sarah McKenna
Athletic Performance Lead	(Taiwan) Tyler Yao
Head Physiotherapist	(England) Max Asher
Sports Rehabilitator	(England) Ria Arnold
Team Manager	(England) Melanie Antao

Executives
Role	Name
Club Owner	(England) Dominic Silvester
Club Chairman	(England) Neil Golding
Chief Executive Officer	(South Africa) Ed Coetzee
Chief Operating Officer	(Italy) Emanuele Palladino
Board of Directors	(England) Neil Barlow (England) Sonia Green (England) Victor Luck (Ireland) Paul O'Shea (South Africa) Francois Pienaar (England) Kamal Shah

=== Notable former coaches ===
The following former Saracens Women coaches have gone on to serve in high-profile positions at international level, or at other top-tier clubs in the women's or men's game:

- Peter Kennedy (head coach 2000s)
  - England women's / England 7s head coach 2000–02
- (England) Lee Adamson (head coach 2001–07)
  - Scotland women's head coach 2007–08
- (England) Rob Cain (director of rugby / head coach 2014–18)
  - United States women's head coach 2018–23
- James Tirrell (backs coach 2020–23)
  - Saracens men's skills / academy transition coach 2023–
  - England men's Under-20s assistant coach 2020
- (Argentina) Juan Figallo (forwards coach 2021–23)
  - Saracens men's scrum / academy transition coach 2023–24
- (Scotland) Duncan Taylor (backs coach 2023–25)
  - Saracens men's academy head coach 2025–
- (England) Rocky Clark (player-coach 2019–23)
  - Leicester women's scrum coach 2023
- (England) Tamara Taylor (player-coach 2020–22)
  - Sweden women's assistant coach 2022, head coach 2023–24
  - Scotland women's Under-20s assistant coach 2025–

== Playing kit ==
The Saracens playing kit is currently supplied by British sportswear manufacturer Castore, as of the beginning of the 2021–22 season. The club's principal partner and primary shirt sponsor is American financial services company StoneX. The replica kit featured the logo of the Saracens Foundation, a charity operated by the club and £5 of proceeds from each jersey are donated to the foundation.

=== Recent kit designs ===
The following graphics represent the designs of the Saracens playing kit between 2006 and 2017:

Home: 2006–2009	Home: 2009–2012	Home: 2012–2014	Home: 2014–2015	Home: 2015–2016	Home: 2016–2017

Away: 2006–2009	Away: 2009–2012	Away: 2012–2014	Away: 2014–2015	Away: 2015–2016	Away: 2016–2017

=== Summary of kit manufacturers and sponsors ===
The following organisations have manufactured and sponsored the Saracens playing kit since the 1996–97 season:

Season	Manufacturer	Lead sponsor
1996–1997	(United Kingdom) Cotton Oxford	(United Kingdom) Pinnacle Insurance
1997–1998	(United Kingdom) Cotton Oxford	(Japan) Kenwood
1998–1999	(United Kingdom) Cotton Oxford	(Japan) Kenwood
1999–2000	(United Kingdom) Cotton Oxford	(Japan) Kenwood
2000–2001	(New Zealand) Canterbury	(Japan) Kenwood
2001–2002	(New Zealand) Canterbury	(Germany) UniBond
2002–2003	(United States) Reebok	(Germany) UniBond
2003–2004	(United States) Reebok	(Germany) UniBond
2004–2005	(Australia) KooGa	(United Kingdom) Man Financial
2005–2006	(Australia) KooGa	(United Kingdom) Man Financial
2006–2007	(Australia) KooGa	(United Kingdom) Man Financial
2007–2008	(Australia) KooGa	(United Kingdom) Man Financial

Season	Manufacturer	Lead sponsor
2008–2009	(Australia) KooGa	(United States) MF Global
2009–2010	(Australia) KooGa	(United States) MF Global
2010–2011	(United States) Nike	(Switzerland) Garmin
2011–2012	(United States) Nike	(Switzerland) Garmin
2012–2013	(United States) Nike	(Germany) Allianz
2013–2014	(United States) Nike	(Germany) Allianz
2014–2015	(United States) Nike	(Germany) Allianz
2015–2016	(United States) Nike	(Germany) Allianz
2016–2017	(Australia) BLK	(Germany) Allianz
2017–2018	(Australia) BLK	(Germany) Allianz
2018–2019	(United States) Nike	(Germany) Allianz
2019–2020	(United States) Nike	(Germany) Allianz

Season	Manufacturer	Lead sponsor
2020–2021	(United States) Nike	(United Kingdom) City Index
2021–2022	(United Kingdom) Castore	(United Kingdom) City Index
2022–2023	(United Kingdom) Castore	(United Kingdom) City Index
2023–2024	(United Kingdom) Castore	(United Kingdom) City Index
2024–2025	(United Kingdom) Castore	(United States) StoneX
2025–2026	(United Kingdom) Castore	(United States) StoneX
2026–2027	(United Kingdom) Castore	(United Kingdom) PensionBee

== Notable players ==
=== Rugby World Cup ===
The following players have been selected to represent their national teams at the Rugby World Cup while at Saracens:

Tournament winners are listed in bold

Tournament	Host nation	Number selected	England players	Other national team players
1991	Wales	5	Emma Mitchell, Jane Mitchell, Janis Ross	Amanda Bennett, Liza Burgess (Wales)
1994	Scotland	8	**Karen Almond (c)**, **Annie Cole**, **Emma Mitchell**, **Jane Mitchell**, **Janis Ross**	Amanda Bennett, Liza Burgess (Wales)
1994	Scotland	8	**Karen Almond (c)**, **Annie Cole**, **Emma Mitchell**, **Jane Mitchell**, **Janis Ross**	Michelle Cave (Scotland)
1998	Netherlands	15	Susie Appleby, Helen Clayton, Trudi Collins, Maxine Edwards, Claire Frost, Claire Green, Emma Mitchell, Teresa O'Reilly, Nicky Ponsford, Janis Ross	Geraldine Baylis, Liza Burgess, Claire Donovan, Eleanor Green (Wales)
1998	Netherlands	15	Susie Appleby, Helen Clayton, Trudi Collins, Maxine Edwards, Claire Frost, Claire Green, Emma Mitchell, Teresa O'Reilly, Nicky Ponsford, Janis Ross	Michelle Cave (Scotland)
2002	Spain	9	Helen Clayton, Assunta de Biase, Maxine Edwards, Claire Frost, Amy Garnett, Emma Mitchell, Teresa O'Reilly, Jenny Phillips	Leslie Cripps (Canada)
2006	Canada	6	Maggie Alphonsi, Karen Andrew, Rachael Burford, Helen Clayton, Amy Garnett	Leslie Cripps (Canada)
2010	England	5	Maggie Alphonsi, Charlotte Barras, Amy Garnett	Leslie Cripps (c), Sarah Ulmer (Canada)
2014	France	3	**Maggie Alphonsi**	Kerrie-Ann Craddock, Hannah Casey (Ireland)
2017	Ireland	7	Poppy Cleall, Vicky Fleetwood, Marlie Packer, Emily Scott	Olivia DeMerchant (Canada)
2017	Ireland	7	Poppy Cleall, Vicky Fleetwood, Marlie Packer, Emily Scott	Valeria Fedrighi (Italy)
2017	Ireland	7	Poppy Cleall, Vicky Fleetwood, Marlie Packer, Emily Scott	Jeanina Loyola (Spain)
2022	New Zealand	20	Holly Aitchison, Hannah Botterman, Jess Breach, Poppy Cleall, Zoe Harrison, Leanne Infante, Sarah McKenna, Marlie Packer	Georgia Evans, Kat Evans, Donna Rose (Wales)
2022	New Zealand	20	Holly Aitchison, Hannah Botterman, Jess Breach, Poppy Cleall, Zoe Harrison, Leanne Infante, Sarah McKenna, Marlie Packer	Coreen Grant, Louise McMillan, Jodie Rettie (Scotland)
2022	New Zealand	20	Holly Aitchison, Hannah Botterman, Jess Breach, Poppy Cleall, Zoe Harrison, Leanne Infante, Sarah McKenna, Marlie Packer	Alysha Corrigan, Alex Ellis (Canada)
2022	New Zealand	20	Holly Aitchison, Hannah Botterman, Jess Breach, Poppy Cleall, Zoe Harrison, Leanne Infante, Sarah McKenna, Marlie Packer	Lotte Clapp, Alev Kelter (United States)
2022	New Zealand	20	Holly Aitchison, Hannah Botterman, Jess Breach, Poppy Cleall, Zoe Harrison, Leanne Infante, Sarah McKenna, Marlie Packer	Catha Jacobs (South Africa)
2022	New Zealand	20	Holly Aitchison, Hannah Botterman, Jess Breach, Poppy Cleall, Zoe Harrison, Leanne Infante, Sarah McKenna, Marlie Packer	Rachel Laqeretabua (Fiji)
2025	England	20	**Jess Breach**, **May Campbell**, **Kelsey Clifford**, **Rosie Galligan**, **Zoe Harrison**, **Marlie Packer**	Olivia Apps, Fancy Bermudez, Alysha Corrigan, Sophie de Goede, Paige Farries, McKinley Hunt, Maya Montiel, Julia Omokhuale, Laetitia Royer, Gabby Senft (Canada)
2025	England	20	**Jess Breach**, **May Campbell**, **Kelsey Clifford**, **Rosie Galligan**, **Zoe Harrison**, **Marlie Packer**	Georgia Evans, Donna Rose (Wales)
2025	England	20	**Jess Breach**, **May Campbell**, **Kelsey Clifford**, **Rosie Galligan**, **Zoe Harrison**, **Marlie Packer**	Beth Blacklock (Scotland)
2025	England	20	**Jess Breach**, **May Campbell**, **Kelsey Clifford**, **Rosie Galligan**, **Zoe Harrison**, **Marlie Packer**	Lotte Sharp (United States)

=== Club captains ===
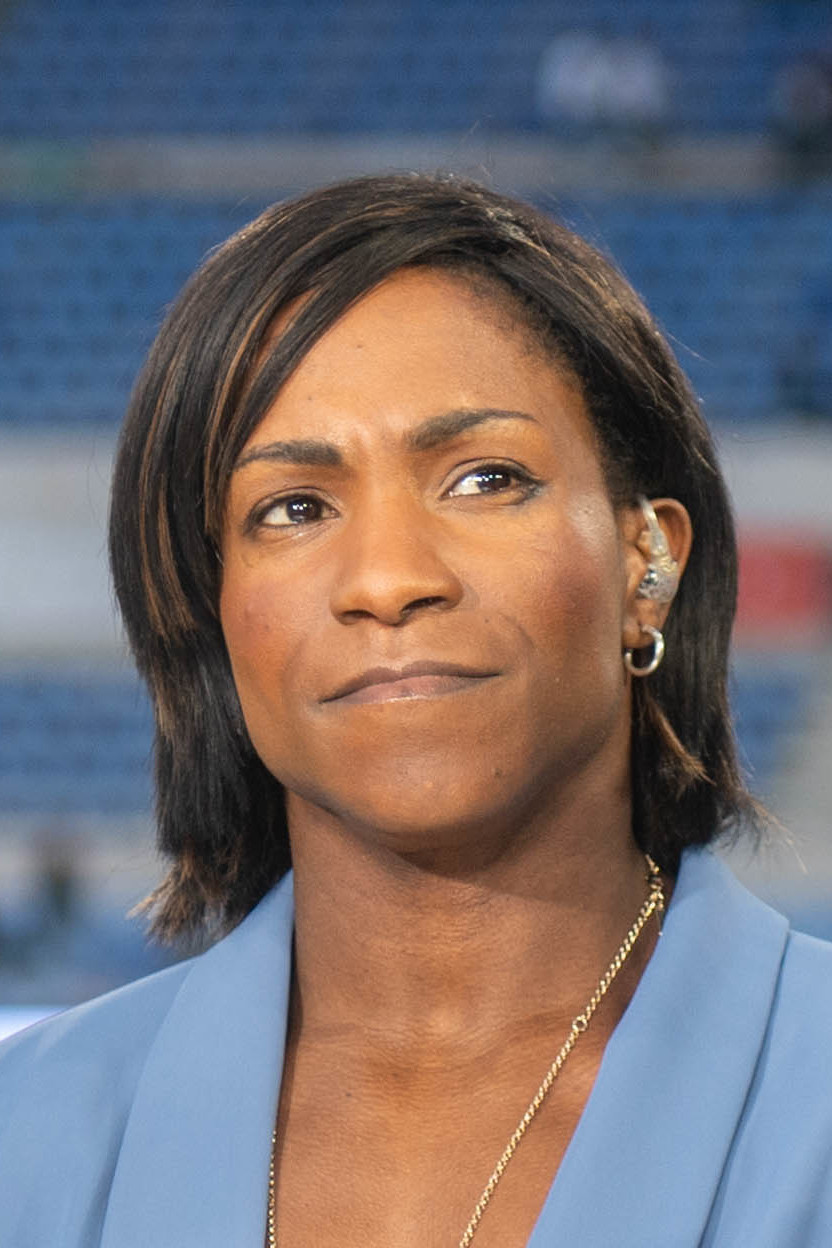
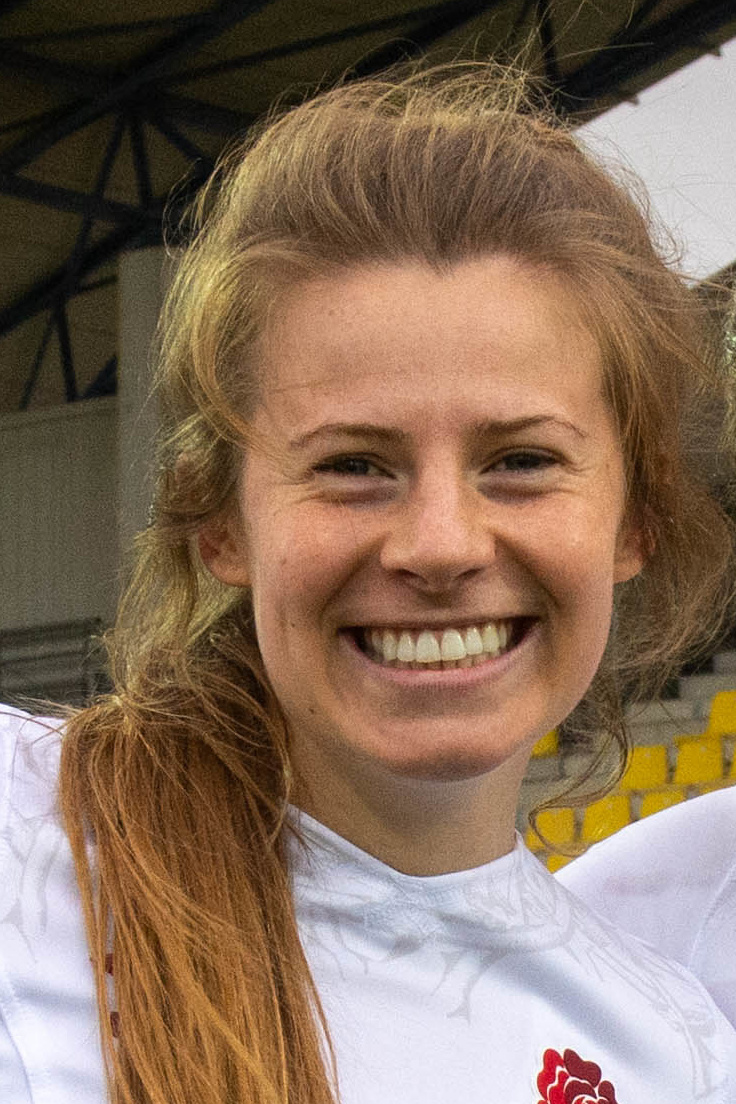
Left: Maggie Alphonsi, the club's former captain.
Right: Zoe Harrison, the club's current co-captain.

The following players have held the position of Saracens Women club captain since it was established in 1989:

- 1989–1992 - (Wales) Liza Burgess
- 1993–1995 - (England) Katie Ball
- 1995–1997 - (England) Janis Ross
- 1997–1998 - (England) Janice Byford
- 1998–2002 - (England) Claire Frost
- 2002–2004 - (England) Helen Clayton
- 2005–2007 - (Canada) Leslie Cripps
- 2007–2009 - (England) Amy Garnett
- 2010–2012 - (Wales) Louise Horgan
- 2012–2013 - (England) Sonia Green
- 2012–2015 - (England) Maggie Alphonsi
- 2015–2017 - (England) Sonia Green
- 2017–2025 - (United States) Lotte Sharp
- 2022–2025 - (England) Marlie Packer
- 2025–present - (England) May Campbell
- 2025–present - (England) Zoe Harrison

=== International players ===
The following Saracens Women players, past and present, have represented their respective national test or sevens teams during their rugby union career:

Current squad members, as of the 2026–27 season, are listed in bold

==== England ====
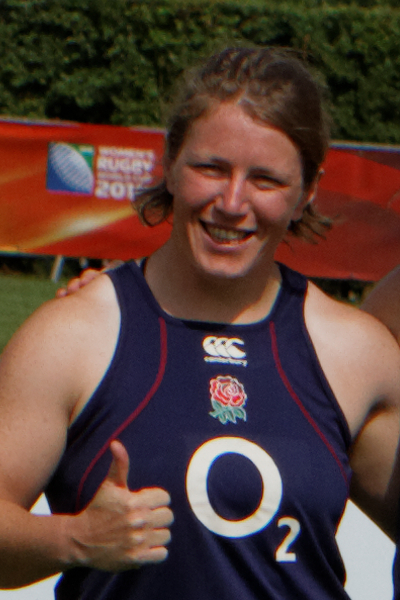
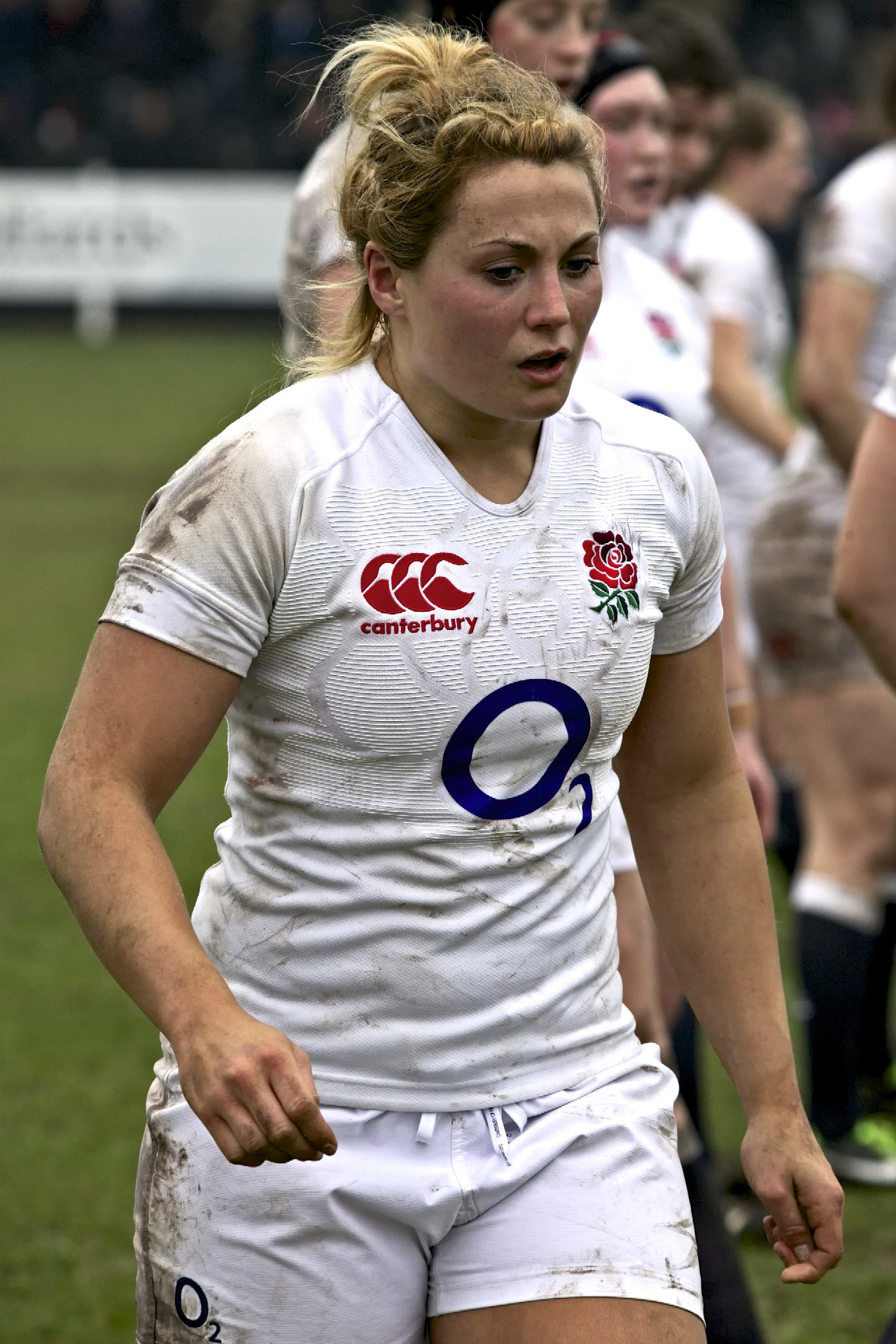
Saracens alumni Rocky Clark and Vicky Fleetwood won the 2014 Rugby World Cup with England.
- Sasha Acheson
- Holly Aitchison
- Claire Allan
- Karen Almond
- Maggie Alphonsi
- Karen Andrew
- Susie Appleby
- Pip Atkinson
- Katie Ball
- Fiona Barnet
- Charlotte Barras
- **Ellie Boatman**
- Hannah Botterman
- **Jess Breach**
- **Sophie Bridger**
- Rachael Burford
- Janice Byford
- **May Campbell**
- Mackenzie Carson (Note: Mackenzie Carson first represented Canada at test level between 2018 and 2019, before switching her allegiance to England in 2023.)
- Lauren Cattell
- Rocky Clark
- Helen Clayton
- Bryony Cleall
- **Poppy Cleall**
- **Kelsey Clifford**
- Annie Cole
- Trudi Collins
- **Liz Crake**
- Assunta de Biase
- Chris Diver
- Helen Durman
- Maxine Edwards
- **Bryony Field**
- Vicky Fleetwood
- Jenny Foster
- Claire Frost
- Hannah Gallagher
- Rosie Galligan
- Amy Garnett
- Claire Green
- Sonia Green
- **Sydney Gregson**
- Georgina Gulliver
- Fiona Hackett
- **Zoe Harrison**
- Leanne Infante
- Georgie Lingham
- Vicky Macqueen
- **Sarah McKenna**
- **Chantelle Miell**
- Emma Mitchell
- Jane Mitchell
- Teresa O'Reilly
- Marlie Packer
- Jenny Phillips
- Nicky Ponsford
- Paula Ramsey
- Sam Robson
- Janis Ross
- Helena Rowland
- Tammy Samuel
- Emily Scott
- Genevieve Shore
- Sandra Soler-Gomez
- Tamara Taylor
- Emma Uren
- **Beth Wilcock**
- Claire Williets
- Deborah Wills
- **Ella Wyrwas**

==== Britain and Ireland ====
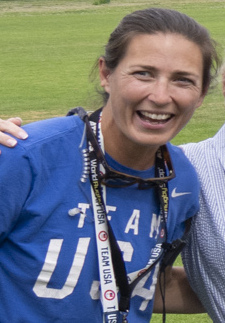
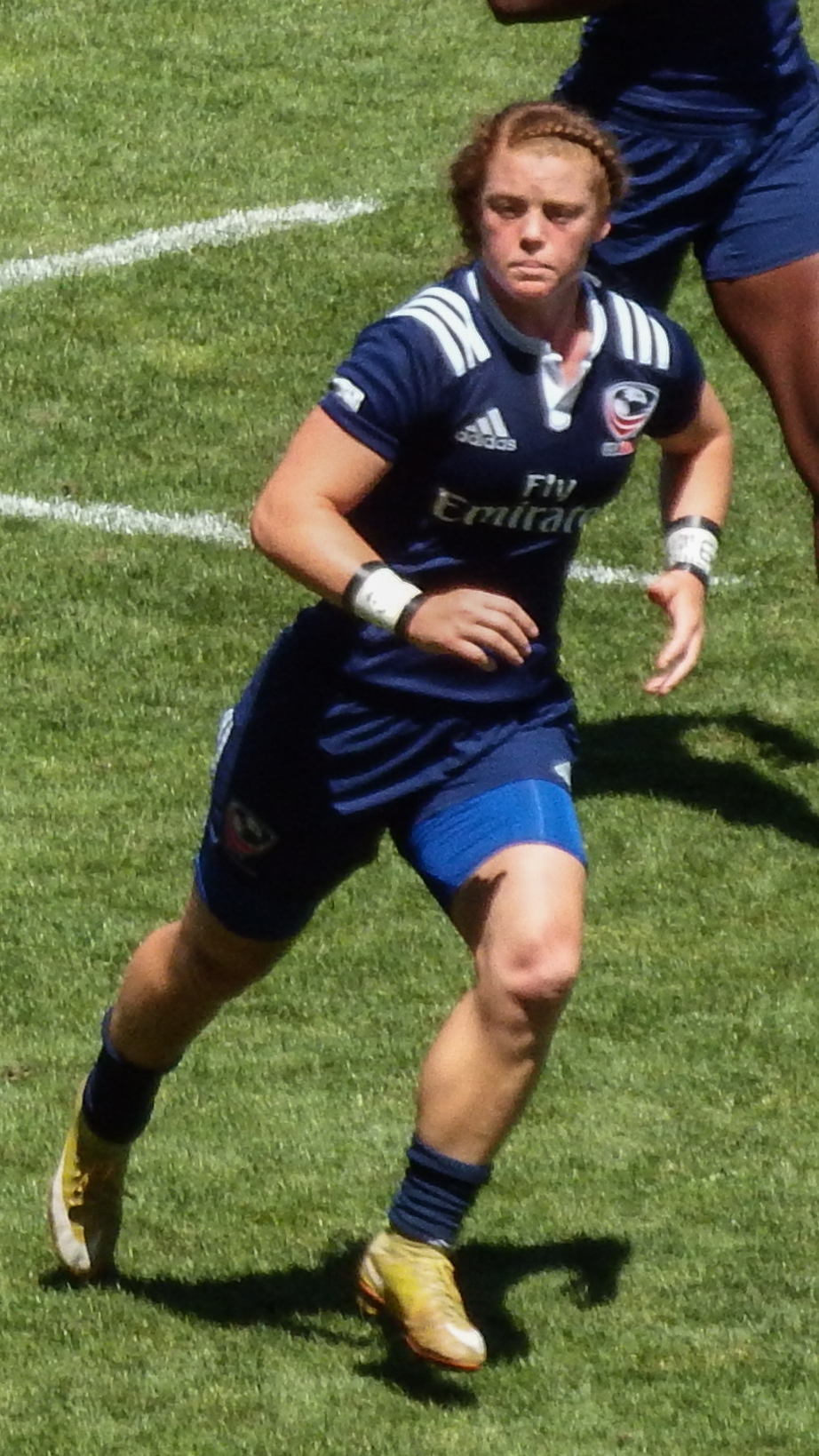
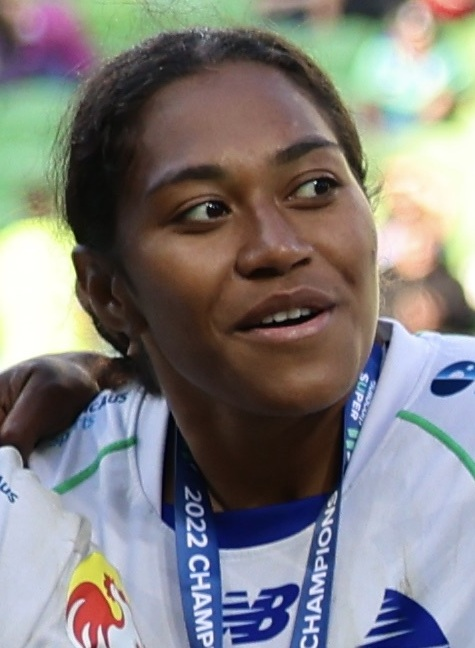
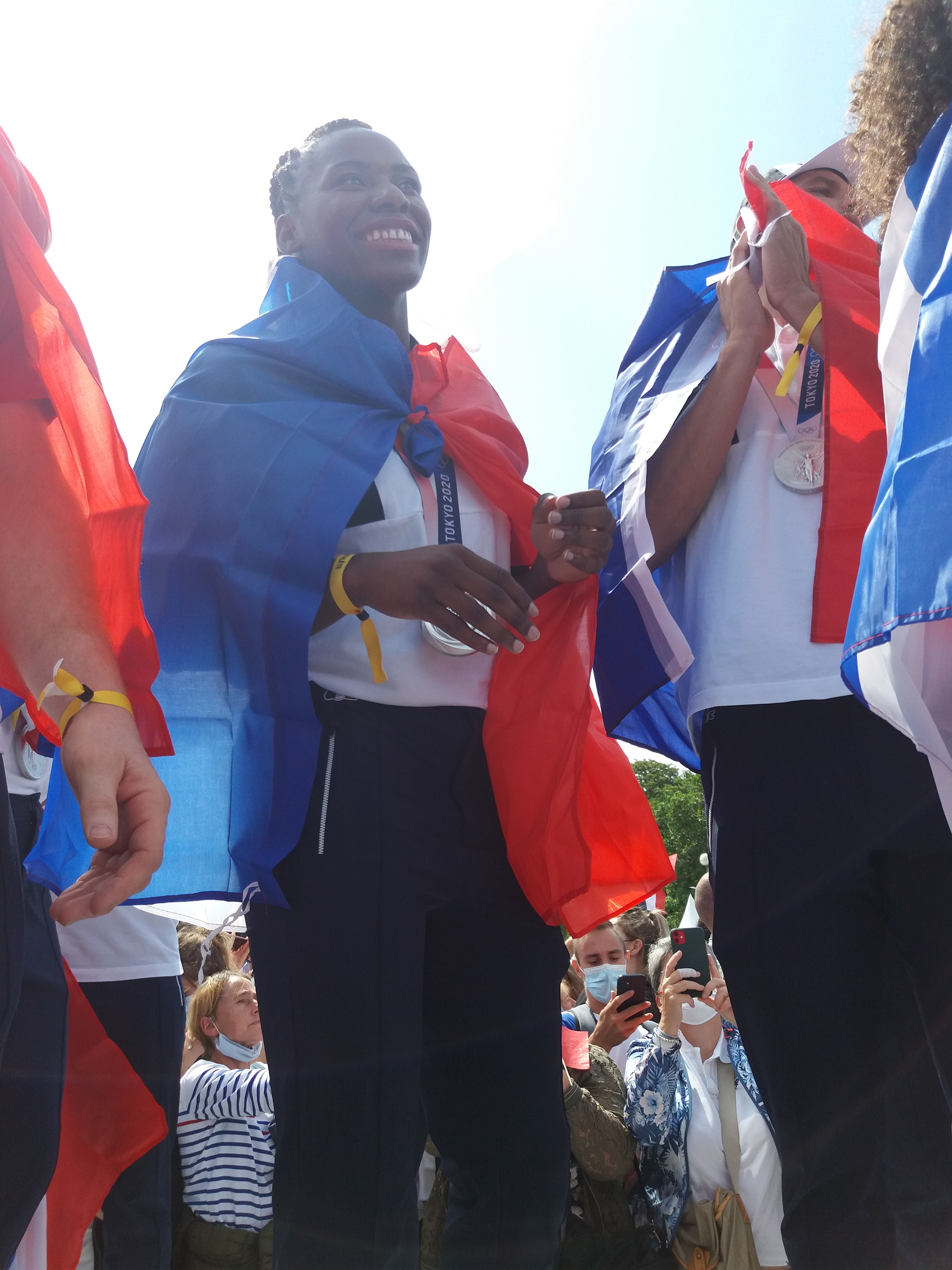
Top: Saracens alumni Emilie Bydwell and Alev Kelter represented the United States in 15s and 7s.
Bottom: Rachel Laqeretabua (Fiji) and Séraphine Okemba (France) played at the 2022 World Cup.
- (Scotland) Isla Alejandro
- (Scotland) Beth Blacklock
- (Scotland) Michelle Cave
- (Scotland) Abi Evans
- (Scotland) Coreen Grant
- (Scotland) Lisa Martin
- (Scotland) Fiona McIntosh
- (Scotland) **Louise McMillan**
- (Scotland) Jodie Rettie
- (Scotland) Fiona Sim
- (Scotland) Anna Stodter
- (Wales) Geraldine Baylis
- (Wales) Amanda Bennett
- (Wales) Liza Burgess
- (Wales) Rebecca De Filippo
- (Wales) Emma Deutsch
- (Wales) Claire Donovan
- (Wales) **Georgia Evans**
- (Wales) Kat Evans
- (Wales) Kath Foale
- (Wales) Eleanor Green
- (Wales) Eloise Hayward (Note: Eloise Hayward first represented England in rugby sevens, before switching her allegiance to Wales in 2022.)
- (Wales) Claire Horgan
- (Wales) Louise Horgan
- (Wales) Natalia John
- (Wales) Jade Knight
- (Wales) Louise Rickard
- (Wales) **Donna Rose**
- (Wales) **Amelia Tutt**
- (Wales) Flo Williams
- (Ireland) Kerrie-Ann Craddock
- (Ireland) Hannah Casey
- (Ireland) Grace Moore
- (Ireland) Ellena Perry (Note: Ellena Perry first represented England at test level between 2018 and 2020, before switching her allegiance to Ireland in 2025.)
- (Ireland) Taryn Schutzler
- (Ireland) Emma Swords
- (Ireland) Jade Wong

==== Other nations ====
- (Canada) **Olivia Apps**
- (Canada) Fancy Bermudez
- (Canada) **Alysha Corrigan**
- (Canada) Leslie Cripps
- (Canada) **Sophie de Goede**
- (Canada) Olivia DeMerchant
- (Canada) Alex Ellis
- (Canada) **Paige Farries**
- (Canada) McKinley Hunt
- (Canada) Mandy Marchak
- (Canada) Maya Montiel
- (Canada) **Julia Omokhuale**
- (Canada) Laetitia Royer
- (Canada) **Gabby Senft**
- (Canada) Janna Slevinsky
- (Canada) Julia Sugawara
- (Canada) Emma Taylor
- (Canada) Sarah Ulmer
- (Denmark) Nina Vistisen
- (Fiji) Rachel Laqeretabua
- (France) Séraphine Okemba
- (Hong Kong) **Roshini Turner**
- (Italy) Valeria Fedrighi
- (Netherlands) Samantha Martinez Gion
- (Netherlands) Tessa Wijmans
- (South Africa) Catha Jacobs
- (Spain) Jeanina Loyola
- (United States) Emilie Bydwell
- (United States) Alev Kelter
- (United States) **Lotte Sharp** (Note: Lotte Sharp first represented England at test level between 2016 and 2018, before switching her allegiance to the United States in 2022.)
- (United States) Carly Waters

=== Finals XVs ===
==== Premiership Finals ====
The following graphics show the starting line-ups for Saracens in all seven of the club's Premiership Women's Rugby Final appearances:

Key
Gold medal	Denotes that the team ended the final as league champions
Silver medal	Denotes that the team ended the final as league runners-up

**2016 Women's Premiership Final Starting XV**

**(vs. Richmond)**

**2018 Tyrrells Premier 15s Final Starting XV**

**(vs. Harlequins)**

**2019 Tyrrells Premier 15s Final Starting XV**

**(vs. Harlequins)**

**2021 Allianz Premier 15s Final Starting XV**

**(vs. Harlequins)**

**2022 Allianz Premier 15s Final Starting XV**

**(vs. Exeter Chiefs)**

**2025 Premiership Women's Rugby Final Starting XV**

**(vs. Gloucester-Hartpury)**

**2026 Premiership Women's Rugby Final Starting XV**

**(vs. Trailfinders)**

==== PWR Cup Finals ====
The following graphics show the starting line-ups for Saracens in all three of the club's PWR Cup Final appearances:

Key
Gold medal	Denotes that the team ended the final as cup champions
Silver medal	Denotes that the team ended the final as cup runners-up

**2023 Allianz Cup Final Starting XV**

**(vs. Exeter Chiefs)**

**2024 Allianz Cup Final Starting XV**

**(vs. Bristol Bears)**

**2025 PWR Cup Final Starting XV**

**(vs. Harlequins)**

== Personnel honours and records ==
=== World Rugby Awards ===
The following Saracens players have earned recognition at the World Rugby Awards (presented annually since 2001):

Key
Player (X)	Name of the player and number of times that they had been nominated for the award at that point (if more than one)

Women's 15s Player of the Year
Year	Nominated	Winner
2006	(England) Maggie Alphonsi	(England) Maggie Alphonsi
2010	(England) Maggie Alphonsi (2)	—
2021	(England) Poppy Cleall	—
2023	(England) Marlie Packer	(England) Marlie Packer
2025	(Canada) Sophie de Goede	(Canada) Sophie de Goede
2026	(England) Zoe Harrison	—

Women's 15s Dream Team of the Year
Year	No.	Player	Position	Ref
2021	8.	(England) Poppy Cleall	Number 8	
2022	7.	(England) Marlie Packer	Openside Flanker	
2023	7.	(England) Marlie Packer (2)	Openside Flanker	
2024	7.	(Canada) Sophie de Goede	Openside Flanker	
2025	4.	(Canada) Sophie de Goede (2)	Lock	
2025	10.	(England) Zoe Harrison	Fly-Half	
2026	4.	(Canada) Sophie de Goede (3)	Lock	
2026	9.	(Canada) Olivia Apps	Scrum-Half	
2026	10.	(England) Zoe Harrison (2)	Fly-Half	
2026	14.	(England) Jess Breach	Right Wing	

Women's 15s Team of the Decade (2010s)
No.	Player	Position
1.	(England) Rocky Clark	Loosehead Prop
5.	(England) Tamara Taylor	Lock
7.	(England) Maggie Alphonsi	Openside Flanker

World Rugby Hall of Fame
Year	Inductee	Position	Notes	Ref
2016	(England) Maggie Alphonsi	Openside Flanker	Saracens player 2003–2014	
2018	(Wales) Liza Burgess	Number 8	Saracens player 1989–1999	
2025	(England) Rocky Clark	Loosehead Prop	Saracens player 2019–2023	

=== Six Nations Championship Awards ===
The following players have been named in the Women's Six Nations Player of the Championship or Team of the Championship shortlists while at Saracens:

Six Nations Player of the Championship
Year	Nominated	Winner	Ref
2021	(England) Poppy Cleall	(England) Poppy Cleall	
2022	(England) Marlie Packer	—	
2023	(England) Holly Aitchison	—	
2023	(England) Marlie Packer (2)	—	

Six Nations Team of the Championship
Year	Number selected	Players selected	Positions	Ref
2022	1	(England) Marlie Packer	Openside Flanker	
2023	4	(England) Hannah Botterman	Loosehead Prop	
2023	4	(England) Marlie Packer (2)	Openside Flanker	
2023	4	(England) Holly Aitchison	Fly-Half	
2023	4	(England) Jess Breach	Right Wing	
2026	2	(England) Zoe Harrison	Fly-Half	
2026	2	(England) Jess Breach (2)	Left Wing	

=== Premiership Women's Rugby Awards ===
The following Saracens players have been named in the annual Premiership Women's Rugby awards:

Key
Player (X)	Name of the player and number of times that they had been nominated for the award at that point (if more than one)
§	Denotes that the club was also the winner of the Premiership Women's Rugby competition during the same season
‡	Denotes that the club was also the runner-up of the Premiership Women's Rugby competition during the same season

Player of the Season
Season	Nominated	Winner	Ref
2023–24	(England) May Campbell	—	
2024–25‡	—	—	
2025–26^{§}	(Canada) Olivia Apps	(Canada) Olivia Apps	

Director of Rugby of the Season
Season	Nominated	Winner	Ref
2025–26^{§}	(England) Alex Austerberry	—	

Team of the Season
Season	Number selected	Players selected	Positions
2020–21‡	5	(England) Rocky Clark	Loosehead Prop
2020–21‡	5	(Canada) Sophie de Goede	Lock
2020–21‡	5	(Wales) Georgia Evans	Blindside Flanker
2020–21‡	5	(England) Marlie Packer	Openside Flanker
2020–21‡	5	(England) Poppy Cleall	Number 8
2021–22^{§}	4	(England) Marlie Packer (2)	Openside Flanker
2021–22^{§}	4	(England) Ella Wyrwas	Scrum-Half
2021–22^{§}	4	(United States) Alev Kelter	Inside Centre
2021–22^{§}	4	(England) Holly Aitchison	Outside Centre
2022–23	3	(England) Marlie Packer (3)	Openside Flanker
2022–23	3	(England) Poppy Cleall (2)	Number 8
2022–23	3	(England) Holly Aitchison (2)	Fly-Half
2023–24	3	(England) May Campbell	Hooker
2023–24	3	(Canada) Sophie de Goede (2)	Blindside Flanker
2023–24	3	(England) Marlie Packer (4)	Openside Flanker
2024–25‡	0	Not applicable	
2025–26^{§}	3	(England) May Campbell (2)	Hooker
2025–26^{§}	3	(Canada) Olivia Apps	Scrum-Half
2025–26^{§}	3	(England) Zoe Harrison	Fly-Half

Player of the Month
Season	Month	Winner	Position	Ref
2020–21‡	November	(England) May Campbell	Hooker	
2020–21‡	March	(England) Poppy Cleall	Number 8	
2021–22^{§}	December	(England) Marlie Packer	Openside Flanker	
2021–22^{§}	January	(England) Marlie Packer (2)	Openside Flanker	
2021–22^{§}	February	(United States) Alev Kelter	Inside Centre	

Try of the Season
Season	Date	Round	Position	Scorer	Opponent	Stadium	Location	Ref
2017–18^{§}	24 March 2018	18	Wing	(England) Emma Uren	vs. Harlequins	Allianz Park	Hendon	
2018–19^{§}	29 September 2018	4	Wing	(England) Georgie Lingham	vs. Richmond	Athletic Ground	Richmond	
2023–24	6 January 2024	7	Wing	(England) Jess Breach	vs. Sale Sharks	CorpAcq Stadium	Sale	

=== Top scorers ===
The following lists denote the top try scorers and top point scorers for Saracens in recent Women's Premiership and Premiership Women's Rugby seasons:

Most Tries
Season	Player	Position	Tries	Ref
2016–17	(England) Garnet Mackinder	Wing	13	
2017–18^{§}	(England) Poppy Cleall	Number 8	16	
2017–18^{§}	(England) Marlie Packer	Flanker	16	
2018–19^{§}	(England) Georgie Lingham	Wing	17	
2019–20	(England) Marlie Packer (2)	Flanker	9	
2020–21‡	(England) May Campbell	Hooker	17	
2021–22^{§}	(England) Marlie Packer (3)	Flanker	17	
2022–23	(England) Jess Breach	Full-Back	15	
2023–24	(England) Sydney Gregson	Centre	10	
2023–24	(England) Marlie Packer (4)	Flanker	10	
2024–25‡	(England) May Campbell (2)	Hooker	17	
2025–26^{§}	(England) Jess Breach (2)	Wing	12	
2025–26^{§}	(England) May Campbell (3)	Hooker	12	

Most Points
Season	Player	Position	Points	Ref
2016–17	(England) Zoe Harrison	Fly-Half	110	
2017–18^{§}	(England) Helena Rowland	Fly-Half	92	
2018–19^{§}	(England) Georgie Lingham	Wing	103	
2019–20	(Scotland) Lisa Martin	Fly-Half	99	
2020–21‡	(England) Zoe Harrison (2)	Fly-Half	105	
2021–22^{§}	(England) Zoe Harrison (3)	Fly-Half	117	
2022–23	(England) Jess Breach	Full-Back	75	
2022–23	(England) Zoe Harrison (4)	Fly-Half	75	
2023–24	(England) Zoe Harrison (5)	Fly-Half	86	
2024–25‡	(England) Zoe Harrison (6)	Fly-Half	141	
2025–26^{§}	(England) Zoe Harrison (7)	Fly-Half	173	

=== Industry awards ===
==== Rugby Players' Association Awards ====
The following Saracens players have achieved recognition at the annual RPA Awards:

RPA England Player of the Year
Year	Nominee	Winner	Ref
2019	(England) Sarah McKenna	—	
2020	(England) Poppy Cleall	—	
2021	(England) Poppy Cleall (2)	(England) Poppy Cleall	
2022	(England) Marlie Packer	(England) Marlie Packer	
2023	(England) Holly Aitchison	—	
2023	(England) Marlie Packer (2)	—	
2026	(England) Zoe Harrison	(England) Zoe Harrison	

RPA Hall of Fame
Year	Inductee	Notes	Ref
2021	(England) Rocky Clark	Saracens player 2019–2023	

RPA Premier 15s Player of the Year
Season	Nominee	Winner	Ref
2021–22^{§}	(England) Marlie Packer	—	

RPA Special Merit Award
Year	Winner	Notes	Ref
2024	(England) Marlie Packer	100th cap for England in 2024 Six Nations	

RPA 15 Under 23 Player of the Month
Season	Month	Nominee	Winner	Ref
2023–24	October	(England) Bryony Field	—	
2023–24	November	(England) Amelia MacDougall	(England) Amelia MacDougall	
2023–24	December	(England) Kelsey Clifford	—	
2023–24	March	(England) Sophie Bridger	—	
2023–24	April	(England) Tori Sellors	(England) Tori Sellors	
2024–25	September	(England) Amelia MacDougall (2)	—	
2024–25	December	(England) Kelsey Clifford (2)	—	
2024–25	February	(England) Bryony Field (2)	—	
2025–26	September	(England) Kelsey Clifford (3)	—	
2025–26	October	(England) Amelia MacDougall (3)	—	
2025–26	February	(England) Tori Sellors (2)	—	

RPA 15 Under 23 Team of the Season
Season	Number selected	Players selected	Positions
2023–24	3	(England) Kelsey Clifford	No. 3 (Prop)
2023–24	3	(England) Tori Sellors	No. 9 (Scrum-Half)
2023–24	3	(England) Sophie Bridger	No. 13 (Centre)
2024–25	1	(England) Kelsey Clifford (2)	No. 1 (Prop)
2025–26	1	(England) Tori Sellors (2)	No. 9 (Scrum-Half)

==== Rugby Black List Awards ====
The following Saracens players have earned recognition at the annual Rugby Black List Awards, which launched in 2023:

Rising Star Award
Year	Nominee	Winner	Ref
2024	(England) Sharifa Kasolo	(England) Sharifa Kasolo	

Life in Sport Award
Year	Winner	Ref
2023	(England) Maggie Alphonsi	

=== End-of-season club awards ===
The following Saracens players have earned recognition at the club's annual Big Bash end-of-season awards:

==== Women's Premiership era ====
Season	Players' Player of the Season	Young Player of the Season	Best Newcomer of the Season	Captain's Player of the Season
2015–16‡	(England) Sonia Green	(England) May Campbell	(New Zealand) Brooke Sim	(England) Lauren Newman
2016–17	(England) Zoe Harrison	(England) Emma Uren	(England) Garnet Mackinder	Not awarded

==== Premier 15s / Premiership Women's Rugby era ====
Season	Players' Player of the Season	Coaches' Player of the Season	Fans' Player of the Season	Captain's Player of the Season
2017–18^{§}	(England) Helena Rowland	(England) Marlie Packer	(England) Bryony Cleall	Not awarded
2018–19^{§}	(England) Sarah McKenna	(England) Rosie Galligan	(England) Poppy Cleall	Not awarded
2019–20	No awards presented following cancellation of 2019–20 season due to COVID-19 pandemic			
2020–21‡	(England) May Campbell	(Canada) Sophie de Goede	Not awarded	
2021–22^{§}	(Canada) Alysha Corrigan	Not awarded	Not awarded	
2022–23	(England) Sharifa Kasolo	(Wales) Georgia Evans	(England) Poppy Cleall	(Scotland) Louise McMillan
2023–24	(England) Akina Gondwe	Not awarded	(England) Sydney Gregson	Not awarded
2024–25‡	(Scotland) Louise McMillan	(England) Kelsey Clifford	To be determined	(England) May Campbell
2025–26^{§}	To be determined		(England) Zoe Harrison	To be determined

==== Player of the Month ====
The following players have been named the Saracens Player of the Month (awarded since 2021):

Month	2020–21		2021–22		2022–23		2023–24	
Month	Player	Ref	Player	Ref	Player	Ref	Player	Ref
October	Not awarded		(Wales) Georgia Evans		(England) May Campbell		(England) Sydney Gregson	
November	Not awarded		(Scotland) Fiona McIntosh		(England) May Campbell (2)		(England) Sophie Bridger	
December	Not awarded		(England) Marlie Packer		(Scotland) Louise McMillan		(Canada) Sophie de Goede	
January	Not awarded		(England) Marlie Packer (2)		(England) Kelsey Clifford		(England) Marlie Packer	
February	Not awarded		(United States) Alev Kelter		(Wales) Georgia Evans		(Canada) McKinley Hunt	
March	Not awarded		(Canada) Alysha Corrigan		(England) Sharifa Kasolo		(England) May Campbell	
April	(Canada) Sophie de Goede		(England) May Campbell		(England) Sharifa Kasolo (2)		(England) Bryony Cleall	
May	(England) Marlie Packer		(England) May Campbell (2)		Not awarded		(England) Zoe Harrison	

Month	2024–25		2025–26		2026–27	
Month	Player	Ref	Player	Ref	Player	Ref
September	(England) Amelia MacDougall		Not awarded		Not awarded	
October	(England) May Campbell		(England) Sydney Gregson		(England) Joia Bennett	
November	(Canada) Alysha Corrigan		(Canada) Olivia Apps		To be determined	
December	(England) Kelsey Clifford		Not awarded		To be determined	
January	(England) Rosie Galligan		Not awarded		To be determined	
February	(England) Poppy Cleall		(England) Sophie Bridger		To be determined	
March	(England) Jess Breach		Not awarded		To be determined	

== Season summaries ==
	League				Cup	
Season	Competition	Position	Points	Play–offs	Competition	Performance
1989–1990	Women's Division 2	1st (P)	—	N/A	Women's National Cup	Semi–finals
1990–1991	Women's Division 1	2nd	—	N/A	Women's National Cup	Champions
1991–1992	Women's Division 1	2nd	18	N/A	Women's National Cup	Runners–up
1992–1993	Women's Division 1	1st	26	N/A	Women's National Cup	Champions
1993–1994	Women's Division 1	1st	33	N/A	Women's National Cup	Runners–up
1994–1995	Women's Division 1	2nd	18	N/A	No competition	N/A
1995–1996	Women's Division 1	1st	26	N/A	Women's National Cup	Champions
1996–1997	Women's Division 1	2nd	23	N/A	Women's National Cup	Champions
1997–1998	Women's Division 1	1st	—	N/A	Women's National Cup	Champions
1998–1999	Women's Premiership	1st	—	N/A	Women's National Cup	Champions
1999–2000	Women's Premiership	1st	26	N/A	Women's National Cup	Quarter–finals
2000–2001	Women's Premiership	4th	19	N/A	Women's National Cup	Semi–finals
2001–2002	Women's Premiership	1st	—	N/A	Women's National Cup	Semi–finals
2002–2003	Women's Premiership	3rd	16	N/A	Women's National Cup	Champions
2003–2004	Women's Premiership	2nd	57	N/A	Women's National Cup	Runners–up
2004–2005	Women's Premiership	3rd	49	N/A	Women's National Cup	Runners–up
2005–2006	Women's Premiership	1st	61	N/A	No competition	N/A
2006–2007	Women's Premiership	1st	64	N/A	No competition	N/A
2007–2008	Women's Premiership	1st	52	N/A	Women's Premiership Cup	Champions
2008–2009	Women's Premiership	1st	49	N/A	Women's Premiership Cup	Semi–finals
2009–2010	Women's Premiership	2nd	55	N/A	Women's Premiership Cup	Semi–finals
2010–2011	Women's Premiership	4th	44	N/A	Women's Premiership Cup	Semi–finals
2011–2012	Women's Premiership	2nd	50	N/A	Women's Premiership Cup	Semi–finals
2012–2013	Women's Premiership	6th	26	N/A	No competition	N/A
2013–2014	Women's Premiership	2nd	62	N/A	Women's Senior Cup	Pool stage
2014–2015	Women's Premiership	1st	59	N/A	Women's Senior Cup	Champions
2015–2016	Women's Premiership	2nd	61	Runners–up	Women's Senior Cup	Runners–up
2016–2017	Women's Premiership	4th	45	Semi–finals	Women's Senior Cup	Semi–finals
2017–2018	Tyrrells Premier 15s	1st	79	Champions	No competition	N/A
2018–2019	Tyrrells Premier 15s	1st	84	Champions	No competition	N/A
2019–2020	Tyrrells Premier 15s	1st	59	Season annulled (Note: The 2019–20 Premier 15s season was cancelled in March 2020, due to the COVID-19 pandemic.)	No competition	N/A
2020–2021	Allianz Premier 15s	1st	79	Runners–up	No competition	N/A
2021–2022	Allianz Premier 15s	1st	77	Champions	Allianz Cup	6th place
2022–2023	Allianz Premier 15s	3rd	75	Semi–finals	Allianz Cup	Runners–up
2023–2024	Premiership Women's Rugby	2nd	70	Semi–finals	Allianz Cup	Champions
2024–2025	Premiership Women's Rugby	2nd	62	Runners–up	No competition	N/A
2025–2026	Premiership Women's Rugby	2nd	71	Champions	PWR Cup	Champions
2026–2027	Jaecoo PWR	—	—	—	Jaecoo Next Gen Cup	Runners–up

Gold background denotes champions
Silver background denotes runners-up
Pink background denotes relegated

League Season Statistics (2015–2026)
Season	P	W	D	L	PF	PA	PD
2015–2016	16	14	0	2	538	179	+359
2016–2017	16	9	0	7	424	326	+98
2017–2018	20	17	1	2	779	219	+560
2018–2019	20	19	0	1	775	233	+542
2019–2020	12	12	0	0	515	183	+332
2020–2021	20	16	1	3	695	303	+392
2021–2022	20	18	0	2	718	389	+329
2022–2023	19	15	0	4	813	339	+474
2023–2024	17	14	0	3	685	312	+373
2024–2025	18	13	0	5	659	379	+280
2025–2026	18	16	0	2	833	296	+537

Cup Season Statistics (2021–2026)
Season	P	W	D	L	PF	PA	PD
2021–2022	4	2	0	2	68	58	+10
2022–2023	6	4	0	2	208	162	+46
2023–2024	6	5	0	1	212	148	+64
2024–2025	No competition due to 2025 Women's Rugby World Cup						
2025–2026	6	6	0	0	279	101	+178
