= List of years in rugby union =

This page indexes the individual year in rugby union pages. Each year is annotated with one or more significant events as a reference point.

== Years in rugby union ==
=== 20th century ===
- 2000

=== 21st century ===
- 2001
- 2002
- 2003 — England win the World Cup
- 2004
- 2005
- 2006
- 2007 — South Africa win the World Cup
- 2008
- 2009
- 2010
- 2011 — New Zealand win the World Cup
- 2012
- 2013
- 2014
- 2015 — New Zealand win the World Cup
- 2016
- 2017
- 2018
- 2019
- 2020
- 2021
- 2022
- 2023
- 2024
- 2025

== See also ==
- History of rugby union
