= Ella Wyrwas =

England international rugby union player

- Born: 7 March 1999 (age 27) London, England
- Height: 1.6 m (5 ft 3 in)
- Weight: 63 kg (9 st 13 lb)

Rugby union career
- Position: Scrum-half
- Current team: Saracens
Senior career
Years	Team	Apps	(Points)
2017–2018	Saracens	15	(10)
2018–2021	Loughborough	29	(25)
2021–	Saracens	68	(66)
- Correct as of 17 January 2025
International career
Years	Team	Apps	(Points)
2016	England U18s	–	(–)
2018	England U20s	8	(–)
2023–	England	7	(10)
- Correct as of 31 December 2024

Ella Maria Wyrwas (born 7 March 1999) is an English rugby union player, who currently plays as a scrum-half for Saracens Women in Premiership Women's Rugby, the top-flight competition of women's rugby union in England.

== Club career ==
Wyrwas began her senior rugby career when she made her debut for Saracens at the age of 18. She initially played as a centre, but was subsequently deemed too small to continue in that position, resulting in her transition to scrum-half. Her debut season culminated in winning the 2017–18 Premier 15s title, as she was among the replacements in the club's 24–20 final victory over Harlequins.

In September 2018, Wyrwas moved to Premier 15s rivals Loughborough Lightning. The move was due to the club's proximity to the University of Nottingham, where she had earned a sports scholarship to pursue undergraduate studies. However, her playing time was cut short significantly after she sustained serious knee damage in 2019, rupturing her anterior cruciate ligament and lateral collateral ligament. The injury required two operations and resulted in an 18-month layoff. She resumed her spell at Loughborough during the 2020–21 season.

Wyrwas returned for a second stint at Saracens in 2021, and quickly established herself as the team's first-choice scrum-half. She helped the club to achieve its fourth consecutive first-place finish in the 2021–22 regular season, before starting in the play-off final in June 2022, as Saracens were crowned champions by defeating Exeter Chiefs with a score of 43–21. Her performances over the course of the year also earned her recognition in the official Premier 15s Team of the Season.

== International career ==
Wyrwas has represented England at both U18s and U20s levels. Strong performances for Saracens led to her first call-ups to the England senior squad from head coach Simon Middleton, firstly for the 2021 Autumn Internationals and then the 2022 Women's Six Nations Championship, although she did not receive a cap. Despite missing out on the final squad for the 2021 Rugby World Cup, she was recalled ahead of the 2023 Women's Six Nations.

Wyrwas made her international debut on 25 March 2023, as a replacement in England's 58–7 victory against Scotland. This was followed by her first test start, and her first international try, in a 42–7 win over Australia at WXV 2023. In November of that year, she was awarded a full-time central contract with the Red Roses.

== Early life and education ==
Wyrwas was born in London, England and is of Polish descent. She started playing rugby at the age of six, in the minis and junior systems at Saracens. As a teenager, she played for Welwyn RFC alongside future Saracens and England teammates Hannah Botterman, Zoe Harrison and Helena Rowland, achieving regional and national success at U15s level. She continued her development in the AASE Girls Rugby Programme at Hartpury College while studying for her A-levels.

Wyrwas has a bachelor's degree in biology from Nottingham University. During her time there, she also played for and coached the women's rugby team. After completing her university studies and since returning to north London, Wyrwas has been employed as a disability inclusion project officer at the Saracens Foundation, the charitable arm of the club she plays for.
