= Sara Cox (referee) =

English rugby union referee

Sara Cox MBE
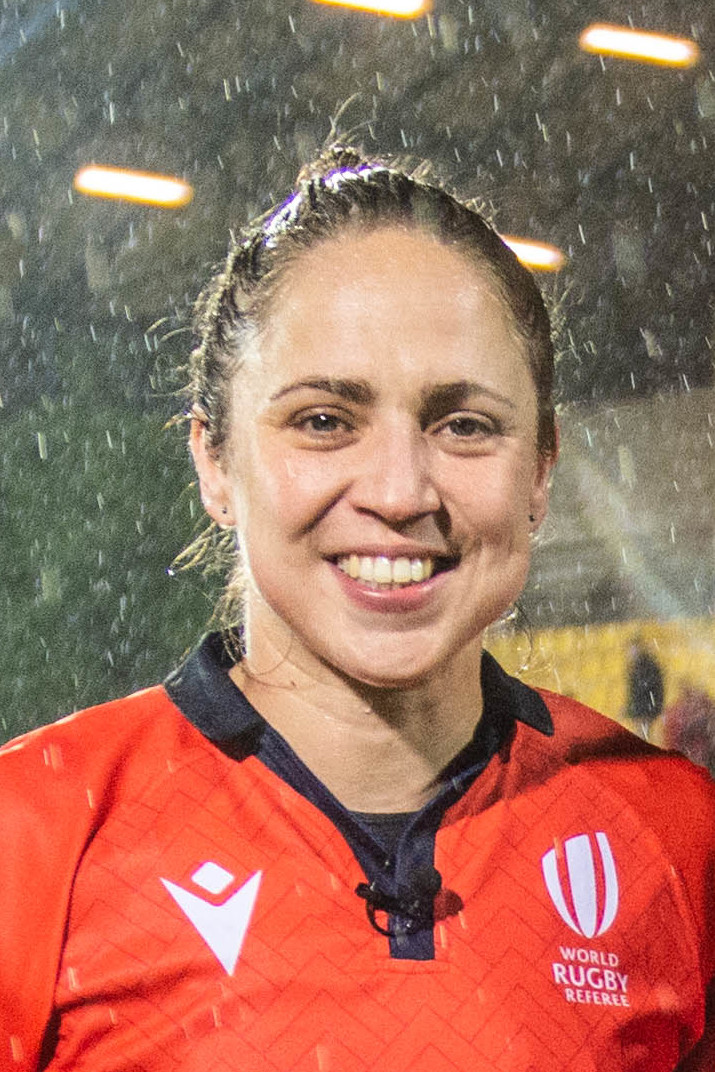
- Born: 1990 or 1991 (age 35–36)
- Occupation: Rugby union referee

Rugby union career
Refereeing career
Years	Competition	Apps
2014–	Women's Rugby World Cup	
2014–	Women's Premiership	
2018–	Premiership Rugby	
2018–	Test match	
- Correct as of 3 November 2018

Sara Louise Cox is an English rugby union referee and former rugby union footballer. In 2016, she became the world's first professional female rugby union referee, and in 2018 she became the first woman to referee a Premiership Rugby Cup match. On 25 September 2021, she became the first woman to referee a Premiership Rugby Union Match when she took centre field for a fixture between Harlequins and Worcester Warriors at the Stoop.

== Career ==
As a player, Cox played rugby for Exeter Saracens RFC, Cullompton and Plymouth Albion, and had trials for England U-21. Aged 17, she decided to retire from playing the sport after an injury, and took up refereeing instead, initially part time, whilst also working for a waste management company.

Cox officiated at the 2014 Women's Rugby World Cup in France. In 2016, she became the first female referee to be centrally contracted by the Rugby Football Union (RFU), and the world's first professional female rugby union referee. In the same year, she officiated the Women's Premiership final between Richmond and Saracens. Cox officiated at the rugby sevens event at the 2016 Summer Olympics in Rio de Janeiro, Brazil. She was the only English referee at the tournament.

In February 2017, Cox became the first female to referee a National League 1 match. In the same year, she was chosen by European Professional Club Rugby (EPCR) to officiate in the men's Challenge Cup, and also officiated at the 2017 Women's Rugby World Cup in Ireland.

In March 2018, Cox became the first female to referee a RFU Championship match, when she officiated a match between Cornish Pirates and Doncaster Knights. She officiated at the rugby sevens event at the 2018 Commonwealth Games in Australia. In November 2018, Cox became the first female to referee a match between two Premiership Rugby teams, when she officiated a Premiership Rugby Cup fixture between Northampton Saints and Wasps at the Ricoh Arena in Coventry. She was also selected as an assistant referee for November 2018 men's internationals between Hong Kong and Germany, and between Kenya and Germany. This was the first time that Cox had officiated in a men's international match. In the same month, she officiated a women's international match between France and New Zealand.

In August 2020, Cox became the first woman to officiate a Premiership Rugby league match, when she was one of Wayne Barnes' assistants for a fixture between Bath and Wasps. In May 2021, she officiated the 2020–21 Premier 15s Final.

On 25 September 2021, Sara Cox became the first woman to referee a Premiership Rugby League Match when she took centre field for a fixture between Harlequins and Worcester Warriors at the Stoop. She had previously been selected as main official for a June 2021 fixture between Worcester and Gloucester, but that match was cancelled due to the COVID-19 pandemic.

In May 2022, Cox was selected as a referee for the delayed 2021 Rugby World Cup.

Cox was appointed Member of the Order of the British Empire (MBE) in the 2023 Birthday Honours for services to rugby union football.

She announced her retirement from international rugby in January 2026.
