= Amy Garnett =

England international rugby union player

- Born: 31 March 1976 (age 50) Canterbury, England
- Height: 1.67 m (5 ft 5 1/2 in)
- Weight: 70 kg (154 lb)
- School: Barton Court Grammar School
- University: Liverpool John Moores University; De Montfort University
- Occupation: Police officer

Rugby union career
- Position: Hooker
- Current team: Saracens Women
International career
Years	Team	Apps	(Points)
2000–????	England	100	(30)
Medal record
Representing England
Women's rugby union
Rugby World Cup
Silver medal – second place	2010 England	Team competition
Silver medal – second place	2006 Canada	Team competition
Silver medal – second place	2002 Spain	Team competition

Amy Garnett (born 31 March 1976) is an English rugby union player who plays for Women's Premiership team Saracens Women as a hooker. She was the first player to earn 100 caps for the England women's national rugby union team.

== Career ==
Garnett started to play rugby at university in Liverpool after a friend suggested she come to a training session. She went on to play for a London-based club, Saracens Women, whom she has represented since 2002. Garnett captained the club from 2007 to 2009, leading them to consecutive Women's Premiership titles and to victory in the Premiership Cup in 2008.

=== International career ===
Garnett made her international debut for England in 2000 against Spain. She continued to be selected for England throughout the decade, eventually earning her 100th cap in 2011 during the match against Canada. This made her the first women's rugby union international to earn 100 caps for England, and the third woman rugby player from any country to reach that mark. Garnett is also England's most selected hooker. She represented her country in three Women's Rugby World Cups, in 2002, 2006, and 2010. On each occasion, England reached the final, only to lose to New Zealand; Garnett was a member of the starting fifteen in each final.

== Personal life ==
Garnett was born in Canterbury, Kent, and lived in nearby Littlebourne, where she attended the local primary school before completing her secondary education at Barton Court Grammar School. She studied for a Bachelor of Education in physical education at Liverpool John Moores University, and earned a BSc (Hons) in sports science and geography at De Montfort University. In addition to playing rugby on an amateur basis, Garnett is a police officer in the Metropolitan Police.
