= Jade Knight =

Wales international rugby union player (born 1989)

- Born: Jade Phillips; 16 February 1989 (age 37) Llanelli, Wales
- School: Ysgol y Strade
- University: Swansea University; King's College London
- Occupation: Midwife

Rugby union career
- Position: Scrum-half
- Current team: Saracens Women
Senior career
Years	Team	Apps	(Points)
- Richmond Women
International career
Years	Team	Apps	(Points)
2018–present	Wales	6	

Jade Knight (née Phillips; born 16 February 1989) is a Welsh rugby union player who plays for Saracens Women of the Premier 15s and the Wales women's national rugby union team. She earned her first international cap for Wales in a 2018 Women's Six Nations Championship and she has also played for Richmond Women in the Women's Premiership. Knight works as a midwife while continuing her rugby career.

== Personal background ==
Knight's birth was on 16 February 1989, and grew up in Llanelli. Her uncle is the Welsh 52-time capped international rugby union player Mark Taylor. She plays rugby in the scrum-half position, and was educated at Ysgol Dewi Sent and Ysgol y Strade. Knight's physical education teacher at secondary school encouraged her to play alongside boys until she prohibited from doing so per school regulations. She matriculated to Swansea University and studied medical genetics. She later went on to study to become a midwife at King's College London, having been inspired from support after giving birth when battling Tokophobia. Knight's dissertation was on researching international athletes and the perspective of being pregnant and giving birth.

== International career ==
She played rugby while studying after reaching an agreement with Imperial College London. Knight combines her part-time midwife work with her rugby career for better family-work balance. When the COVID-19 pandemic significantly affected the United Kingdom, Knight was required to separate herself from her husband and son to work long shifts at St Mary's Hospital in Paddington for three months.

She began competing in rugby when she was 12 years old and went on to played football for Wales at the Under 19 level due to a lack of provision for girls in her local area. A knee injury at age 16 ended her career in football. Following an operation to her knee that kept her out of sport for four years, Knight was able to make a serious return to playing and tried out touch rugby and later full-contact rugby. She has played for Wales in rugby sevens and mixed touch rugby. Knight also played with Waunarlwydd, before moving to Gorseinon where she captained the team.

Knight was also capped for Wales at the Under 20 level. Although she was due to earn her first international cap at the 2014 Women's Six Nations Championship, during pregnancy, Knight vowed to play for the senior team sometime in the future; she feared that would affect her career adversely. Knight asked a coach to draw up a fitness programme that was altered with each semester. She was shortlisted for the Wales women's national team side for the 2018 Women's Six Nations Championship. Knight made her debut for the Wales national team in a Six Nations match against Scotland and she has gone to be capped a total of six times in her career.

== Club career ==
At the club level, Knight played as captain for Richmond Women in the Women's Premiership, and also competed for Cardiff Quins, Scarlets Ladies and Dragons. She won the 2017–18 Welsh Regional Championship before joining Saracens Women of the Premier 15s as a frequent player of the development side midway through the 2018–19 season.
