= Rocky Clark =

Rocky Clark may refer to:

- Rochelle Clark, English rugby player
- Pseudonym of Steve Wozniak, co-founder of Apple
