= Kelsey Clifford =

England international rugby union player

- Born: 11 December 2001 (age 24) London, England
- Height: 172 cm (68 in)
- Weight: 98 kg (216 lb)

Rugby union career
- Position: Prop
- Current team: Saracens
Senior career
Years	Team	Apps	(Points)
2019–	Saracens	103	(120)
- Correct as of 16 January 2025
International career
Years	Team	Apps	(Points)
2019	England U18s	2	(–)
2020–2022	England U20s	4	(–)
2023–	England	21	(35)
Medal record
Representing England
Women's rugby union
Rugby World Cup
Gold medal – first place	2025 England	Team competition

Kelsey Mae Clifford (born 11 December 2001) is an English rugby union player, who currently plays as a prop for Saracens Women in Premiership Women's Rugby, the top-level competition of women's rugby union in England, and for the England national team.

== Club career ==
Clifford began playing rugby in the minis system at Finchley RFC, followed by Old Albanian Junior Saints and subsequently progressed through the Saracens academy pathway. She made her debut for Saracens during the 2019–20 Premier 15s Development League, in their opening round match against Bristol Bears.

After signing a new deal with Saracens, Clifford enjoyed a breakthrough year in the 2021–22 season, becoming a regular figure in the first team. She started at tighthead prop in the play-off final, helping Saracens to a third title as they defeated Exeter Chiefs with a score of 43–21.

== International career ==
Clifford represented England at age-group levels during her teenage years. In 2019, she captained the U18s side to a 39–5 win over Scotland. Later that year, she graduated to the U20s team, going on to make three appearances.

Ahead of the 2023 Women's Six Nations, Clifford received her first call-up to the England senior squad. She won her first international cap on 25 March 2023, as a replacement in England's 58–7 victory against Scotland.

She was named in England's squad for the 2025 Women's Six Nations Championship. She scored her first try for England in the Championship in their away win against Ireland in Cork. She was also the opening try-scorer in England's 59–7 victory over Scotland in the championship on 19 April 2025. She was named in England's squad for the 2025 Women's Rugby World Cup in England.

== Honours ==
England

- Women's Rugby World Cup
  - (gold) Champion (1): 2025
