= Eloise Hayward =

English rugby player

- Born: 7 September 1999 (age 27) Portsmouth, England
- Height: 1.63 m (5 ft 4 in)
- Weight: 62 kg (137 lb; 9 st 11 lb)

Rugby union career
- Position: Scrumhalf
- Current team: Saracens Women
Senior career
Years	Team	Apps	(Points)
2017–2018	Gloucester-Hartpury		
2018− 2019	Saracens		
International career
Years	Team	Apps	(Points)
–	England		
National sevens team
Years	Team		Comps
2019-	England		
- Rugby league career

Playing information
- Position: Centre
Club
Years	Team	Pld	T	G	FG	P
2021−	Leeds Rhinos	5				16

Eloise Hayward (born 7 September 1999) is an English rugby union and rugby league player. She has played representative rugby for England 7s and Great Britain 7s. She plays for Leeds Rhinos and Saracens at club level.

== Early life and education ==
Born in Portsmouth, she grew up in Muscat, Dubai and Jakarta where she started playing rugby aged six. She played rugby union for Muscat Pirates, Dubai Hurricanes, Sharjah Wanderers and Jakarta Komodo Dragons. Before returning to England to play for West Park Leeds.

Hayward is the daughter of former Royal Navy rugby league coach.

She enrolled at Hartpury College after finishing school.

She studied BSc Maths and Economics at the University of Surrey as well as a BSc in Biomedical Science at Loughborough University where she published paper on menstrual cycles and injuries in athletes.

== Rugby career ==
She signed for Saracens in August 2018. She plays as a Scrum-half in rugby union.

She signed for Leeds Rhinos in June 2021.

At Under 18 level, Hayward played for Yorkshire and represented the England Under 18 side at sevens and 15s.

She was part of the England sevens team that went to the Rugby Europe tournament in Kharkiv, Ukraine.
