= Georgia Evans (rugby union) =

Wales international rugby union footballer

- Born: 29 January 1997 (age 29) Belgium
- Height: 168 cm (5 ft 6 in)
- Weight: 84 kg (185 lb)
- University: University of South Wales

Rugby union career
- Position: Second row
- Current team: Saracens
Senior career
Years	Team	Apps	(Points)
2017–2020	Pontyclun Falcons		(0)
2020–present	Saracens	76	(45)
- Correct as of 15 January 2025
International career
Years	Team	Apps	(Points)
2020–present	Wales	43	(10)
- Correct as of 24 September 2025

Georgia Emily Evans (born 29 January 1997) is a Welsh Rugby Union player who plays second row for the Wales women's national rugby union team and Saracens. She made her debut for the Wales national squad in 2020 and represented them at the 2021 Women's Six Nations Championship.

== Club career ==
Evans first became interested in rugby at the age of 16, while she was studying at Yeovil College in Somerset. After moving to Wales in 2014, Evans played with Ynysybwl Ladies for two seasons, before joining the Pontyclun Falcons in 2017. In 2020, Evans signed with her current club, Saracens.

== International career ==
After appearing twice during the 2019 Autumn Internationals, Evans made her Six Nations debut for Wales in 2020. She was selected in Wales squad for the 2021 Rugby World Cup in New Zealand.

She was named in the Welsh side for the 2025 Six Nations Championship in March. On 11 August 2025, she was selected in the Welsh squad to the Women's Rugby World Cup in England.

== Personal life ==
Evans' cousin, Ceri Sweeney, is a former Wales men fly-half who won 35 caps during the course of his career. Her younger brother, Kyle Evans, plays flanker for Pontypridd RFC. Evans is a lesbian, and as of November 2025 is in a relationship with English rugby union player Hannah Botterman.

Evans has a master's degree in strength and conditioning from the University of South Wales.
