= Donna Rose (rugby union) =

- Born: 5 June 1991 (age 35) Salisbury, England
- Height: 170 cm (5 ft 7 in)
- Weight: 95 kg (209 lb)
- Occupation(s): Carpenter, rugby player

Rugby union career
- Position: Prop
- Current team: Saracens
Senior career
Years	Team	Apps	(Points)
2010–2019	Trojans	153	(0)
2019–present	Saracens		(0)
International career
Years	Team	Apps	(Points)
2021–present	Wales	37	(10)
- Correct as of 24 September 2025

Donna Rose (born 5 June 1991) is a Welsh Rugby Union player who plays prop for the Wales women's national rugby union team and Saracens. She made her debut for the Wales national squad in 2021 and represented them at the 2021 Women's Six Nations Championship.

== Club career ==
Growing up in Hampshire, Rose began playing rugby as a teenager, first as a winger for Ellingham & Ringwood RFC under-18s, and later in the back-row for Trojans, for which she made 153 appearances.

After captaining the team for five years, she was approached by then-coach Alex Austerberry to play for Saracens. She signed with the team as prop in 2019.

== International career ==
A Welsh grandfather enabled Rose to join the Wales national squad. She made her debut in the 2021 Women's Six Nations Championship in a match against France.

Rose was selected in Wales squad for the 2021 Rugby World Cup in New Zealand. She was named in the Welsh side for the 2025 Six Nations Championship in March.

She was eventually named in Wales squad to the Women's Rugby World Cup.

== Personal life ==
A trained chef, Rose now works full time as a carpenter with a housing association.

She has been outspoken about her experiences of living with borderline personality disorder (BPD), saying in an interview that she wants to use her platform "to show others that you can live a good life with BPD". She has spoken out against discrimination she has faced for her Traveller background. Rose is an ambassador for rugby-focused mental health charity Brave Mind, and for Rugby Against Cancer.
