= Amanda Bennett (rugby union) =

- Born: 24 July 1964 (age 62)
- Height: 5 ft 6 in (168 cm)
- University: Loughborough University

Rugby union career
Senior career
Years	Team	Apps	(Points)
	Saracens Women		(0)
International career
Years	Team	Apps	(Points)
1986	Great Britain	2	
1987–1996	Wales		
Coaching career
- Years: Team
- Saracens B
- Wales
- 2007: England
- 2011–2014: England U-20

Amanda Bennett (born 24 July 1964) is a former Welsh rugby union player. She represented Wales at the 1991 and 1994 Women's Rugby World Cup's.

== Biography ==
Bennett participated in netball, hockey, and judo while growing up. She was introduced to rugby while attending Loughborough University.

=== Rugby career ===
Bennett represented Great Britain in their first international match against France in 1986. Great Britain was later split into England and Wales. She made her international debut for Wales against England in 1987, a first for both teams.

In 1989 Bennett and several international players founded the Saracens Women's rugby team. She retired from international rugby in 1996 but continued to play club rugby before retiring altogether in 2000.

=== Coaching career ===
Bennett while nearing the end of her playing career helped coach the Saracen's B team. She then became the Head Coach for Wales before stepping down from the role. She returned to coaching Saracens before becoming an elite England coach in 2004. Bennett then led England to win the 2007 European Championship.

Bennett stepped back from international coaching in 2007. She continued coaching Saracens until 2010. In 2011 she was appointed Head Coach of the England Women's U20s up to 2014.
