= Marlie Packer =

England international rugby union player

Marlie Packer OBE
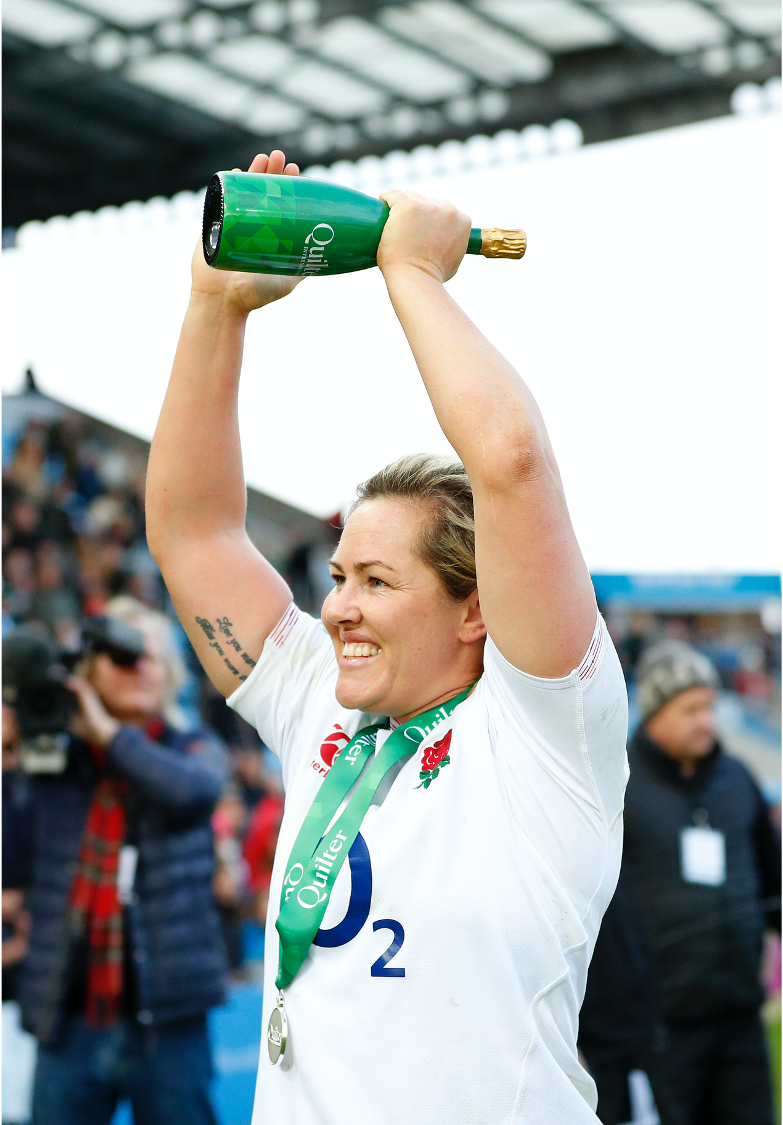
- Packer in 2019
- Born: 2 October 1989 (age 37) Yeovil, Somerset, England
- Height: 165 cm (5 ft 5 in)
- Weight: 73 kg (161 lb)

Rugby union career
- Position: Loose forward
- Current team: Harlequins Women
Amateur team(s)
Years	Team	Apps	(Points)
1994–2007	Ivel Barbarians		
Senior career
Years	Team	Apps	(Points)
2007–2009	Bath		
2009–2013	Bristol		
2013–2016	Wasps	10	
2016–2017	Bristol	10	
2017–2026	Saracens	119	(445)
2026–	Harlequins		
International career
Years	Team	Apps	(Points)
2008–	England	112	(255)
National sevens team
Years	Team		Comps
2013	England 7s		10
Medal record
Representing England
Women's rugby union
Rugby World Cup
Gold medal – first place	2025 England	Team competition
Gold medal – first place	2014 France	Team competition
Silver medal – second place	2021 New Zealand	Team competition
Silver medal – second place	2017 Ireland	Team competition

Marlie Marie Packer OBE (born 2 October 1989) is an English rugby union player (back row / flanker) for Harlequins and England women. She was part of the winning 2014 Women's Rugby World Cup & 2025 Women's Rugby World Cup squads.

== International career ==
Packer began her international career playing for England in 2008. In 2013, she played for the England squad at the 2013 Women's Rugby World Cup Sevens in Moscow. She went on to play for the winning England 15s team during the 2014 World Cup, and again in the 2017 Women's Rugby World Cup.

In 2017 she also played for England in the Women's Six Nations tournament and was part of the winning Grand Slam team in the 2019 Women's Six Nations, playing in four of England's five games. She has won four Six Nations Grand Slam titles with England to date.

Packer started in all but one of England's 2019 Women's Rugby Super Series games and was awarded a full time contract to play in the England team in 2019. In 2020, an ankle injury kept her from playing in the year's Six Nations championship. She was named in the England squad for the delayed 2021 Rugby World Cup held in New Zealand in October and November 2022.

On 17 March 2025, she was called into the Red Roses side for the Six Nations Championship. She was named in England's squad for the Women's Rugby World Cup.

== Club career ==
From 2007 to 2009, Packer played for Bath before moving to Bristol in 2009. In 2013 she was named Bristol Coaches Player of the Season.

Packer signed for Wasps in 2013. After England's World Cup victory in 2014, Packer was made an Honorary member of her hometown club, Yeovil RFC, and given the freedom of Yeovil.

She returned to play for Bristol in 2016 and moved to Saracens Women in 2017, where she continues to play. Packer was part of the team as they won the inaugural Tyrells Premier 15s competition in 2018. In the same year she was also named the Saracens Coaches Player of the Season.

After nine years at Saracens, Packer announced she was leaving the club having not been offered a contract to stay. After considering retirement, she approached Harlequins Women and agreed a deal to join the South London club for the 2026-2027 PWR season.

== Honours ==
- 2014 Women's Rugby World Cup winner
- 2014 Freedom of Yeovil
- 2017 Women's Rugby World Cup finalist
- 2023 England Captain
- 2023 World Player of the Year
- 2025 Women's Rugby World Cup winner

== Early life ==
Packer began playing rugby at five years old for the Ivel Barbarians in Yeovil. She remained at the club for 13 years.

She attended Birchfield Community Primary School, Buckler's Mead Academy and Yeovil College. Outside of rugby, Packer is a qualified plumber.

== Personal life ==
In September 2020, Packer's former partner Natasha gave birth to their son, Oliver. In April 2023, when 3½ years old, Oliver accompanied Marlie as she ran out as England captain, to face France at Twickenham, in front of a world record crowd.

Packer is engaged to Harlequins and Red Roses teammate Rosie Galligan.
