= Rosie Galligan =

England international rugby union player

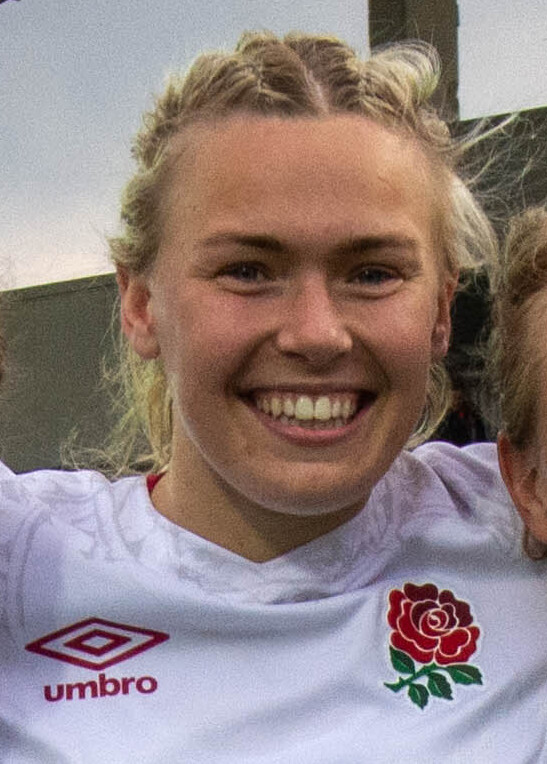
- Galligan in 2022
- Born: Rosie Jemima Galligan; 30 April 1998 (age 28) Finchley
- Height: 175 cm (5 ft 9 in)
- Weight: 85 kg (187 lb; 13 st 5 lb)
- School: Maidstone Grammar School for Girls

Rugby union career
- Position: Lock
- Current team: Saracens Women
Youth career
- 2013–2016: Aylesford Bulls
Senior career
| Years | Team | Apps | (Points) |
| 2016–2021, | Saracens | | |
| 2021–2023 | Harlequins | | |
| 2023–2026 | Saracens | | |
| 2026– | Harlequins | | |
International career
| Years | Team | Apps | (Points) |
| 2017–2019 | England U20 | | |
| 2019– | England | 31 | (20) |
Medal record
Representing England
Women's rugby union
Rugby World Cup
| Gold medal – first place | 2025 England | Team competition |
| Silver medal – second place | 2021 New Zealand | Team competition |

Rosie Jemima Galligan (born 30 April 1998) is an English rugby union player. She is a member of the England women's national rugby union team and plays for Saracens at club level.

== International career ==
After playing for England U20s in 2017/18 and 2018/19, Galligan's full England debut came off the bench against Ireland in the 2019 Six Nations. Her international career was interrupted by a bout of meningitis in September 2019 followed by a serious injury in January 2020 when a fall in a line-out caused a broken leg and ankle along with three ruptured ligaments, so her second cap did not come until the 2022 Six Nations match against Scotland.

In September 2022 Galligan was named in the England squad for the COVID-delayed 2021 Rugby World Cup.

She was named in England's squad for the Women's Six Nations Championship on 17 March 2025. She made the Red Roses side for the Women's Rugby World Cup in England.

== Club career ==
Galligan joined Premier 15s team Saracens for the 2016/17 season, breaking into their first team the following year, and helped them to two Premier 15 titles.

She signed for Harlequins in June 2021. Galligan left Harlequins to return to Saracens in 2023.

After three years at Saracens, Galligan announced she was leaving Saracens for a second time to once again join Harlequins. This followed a similar move by her partner Marlie Packer.

== Early life and education ==
Galligan grew up in Kent where she developed an interest in rugby after being involved in a touch tournament and went on to play for Aylesford Bulls. She represented Kent at age group level in rugby, hockey and cricket.

== Personal life ==
In 2018, Galligan underwent breast reduction surgery due to back and neck pain which reportedly "could affect her future as an elite athlete". She missed three years of her rugby career after contracting meningitis in 2019.

Galligan is engaged to fellow England rugby international Marlie Packer.

== Honours ==
England

- Women's Rugby World Cup
  - (gold) Champion (1): 2025
