= Helena Rowland =

England international rugby union player

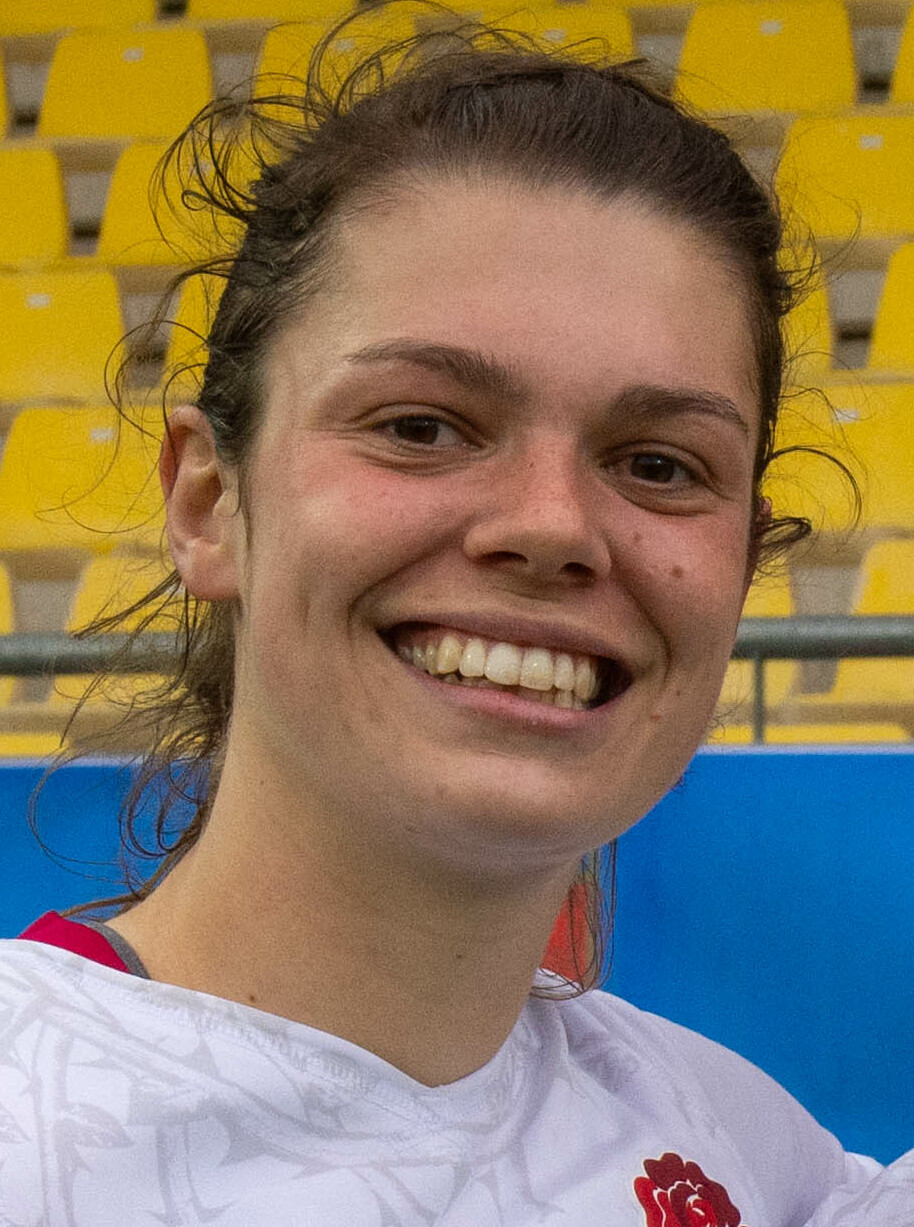
- Rowland with England in 2022
- Born: 19 September 1999 (age 27)
- Height: 1.68 m (5 ft 6 in)
- Weight: 66 kg (146 lb)

Rugby union career
- Position: Fly-half
Senior career
Years	Team	Apps	(Points)
-	Loughborough Lightning	-	(-)
International career
Years	Team	Apps	(Points)
2020–present	England	46	(172)
National sevens teams
Years	Team		Comps
2018–present	England 7s		
2019–present	Great Britain 7s		
Medal record
Representing England
Women's rugby union
Rugby World Cup
Gold medal – first place	2025 England	Team competition
Silver medal – second place	2021 New Zealand	Team competition

Helena Charlotte Rowland (born 19 September 1999) is an English rugby union player. She plays for England women's national rugby union team internationally and Loughborough Lightning in the PWR.

== International career ==
At the start of 2018 she represented England U20s in three games. Rowland made her international debut for the senior England 15s team in November 2020 and she played versus Italy as England took the grand slam in the 2020 Women's Six Nations Championship.

She focused on women's rugby sevens for several years, and has been very successful, appearing regularly in the World Rugby Sevens Series and part of the team making a bid for the Great Britain squad at the 2020 Olympic Games. When the Olympic Games were postponed due to the COVID-19 Pandemic, funding was cut for the sevens squad and Rowland returned to 15s.

In 2021, Rowland was contracted for the 2021 Women's Six Nations Championship and started in the opening game against Scotland when teammate Zoe Harrison was suspended due to a breach in Coronavirus protocols. Rowland was named in the England squad for the delayed 2021 Rugby World Cup held in New Zealand in October and November 2022.

On 17 March 2025, she was named in England's squad for the Women's Six Nations Championship. In July 2025, she was named in the England squad for the 2025 Rugby World Cup.

Rowland scored 27 points against Samoa in the pool stages, she converted 11 of her side's 14 tries, including her own. It is the most points scored by an England player in a Women's World Cup.

== Club career ==
Rowland first played for Welwyn RFC, where she led the Under 15s team to the national sevens title. In 2016 she suffered a fractured tibia that left her off the pitch for six months but she returned to win gold at the 2016 School Games for the South East team.

In 2017 she moved to Saracens Women and was part of the Premier 15s winning team in 2018.

After playing sevens rugby at international level, Rowland returned to the Premier 15s in 2020 with Loughborough Lightning.

== Early life and education ==
She began her rugby career at Aylesbury RFC, aged six, going on to play for Tring and Bicester RFC.

Rowland comes from a sporting family. Her brother Dan played rugby for Bath University first 15, Wasps U18 and Esher first 15. Her mother, Lisa, represented her country in athletics.

== Honours ==
England

- Women's Rugby World Cup
  - (gold) Champion (1): 2025
