= Lotte Clapp =

England & US international rugby union player

- Born: January 13, 1995 (age 31) Welwyn Garden City, England
- Height: 5 ft 5 in (165 cm)
- Weight: 149 lb (68 kg)

Rugby union career
- Position: Wing
Senior career
Years	Team	Apps	(Points)
2014–	Saracens	126	(0)
International career
Years	Team	Apps	(Points)
2016–2018	England	11	(5)
2022–	United States	32	(25)

Charlotte Louise “Lotte” Sharp (née Clapp; born on the January 13, 1995) is an English-born rugby union player who plays internationally for the United States; she previously represented England. She plays for Saracens in the Premier 15s.

== Rugby career ==
Clapp joined Saracens in 2014 and made her debut against Lichfield.

Clapp previously played for England and has won ten caps for them. She featured for England against the Eagles at the 2016 Super Series in Utah. She has also captained Saracens to three titles.

Clapp took a break from rugby to train as a teacher and on her return, switched to representing the United States, which she qualifies for because of her American-born mother. She made her international debut for the Eagles at the 2022 Pacific Four Series. In August 2022, she re-signed with Saracens for the 2022–23 Premier 15s season.

Clapp was selected in the Eagles squad for the delayed 2021 Rugby World Cup in New Zealand. In 2023, She was named in the Eagles traveling squad for the Pacific Four Series.

On July 17, 2025, she was named in the Eagles side to the Women's Rugby World Cup in England.
