= Leslie Cripps =

Canadian rugby union player

- Born: September 29, 1977 (age 49)

Rugby union career
- Position: Front-row
Amateur team(s)
Years	Team	Apps	(Points)
- Williams Lake Rugby Club
1996-1999	Victoria Valkaries		
- Velox RFC
- James Bay AA
2001-?	Saracens		
International career
Years	Team	Apps	(Points)
2000	Canada U23		
2001-2010	Canada	47	

Leslie Cripps is a Canadian rugby union player and former captain of the national team. A national team representative for over a decade, Cripps is considered one of the top ten North American women rugby union players.

== Rugby career ==
Cripp's rugby career started after graduating high school in the summer with the Williams Lake Rugby Club. She then played with the University of Victoria Valkaries (1996-1999), the Velox and the James Bay AA in Victoria, B.C.

Cripps' first international appearance was on the Canadian U23 team in 2000 against the United States. A year later, Cripps also played against the Americans for her cap for the national seniors team. Cripps made 47 international appearances between 2001 and 2010. The represented Canada at the 2002, 2006, and 2010 Women's Rugby World Cup.

In 2001, she joined Saracens in London, England where she received "New Player of the Year" award. After several years with the Saracens, Cripps captained the club for two years and won five league titles.

== Awards and recognition ==
- 2003, Worlds 15s team, selection
- 2008, Nomads (Barbarians select side), selection (captain)
- 2019, BC Rugby Hall of Fame inductee
- 2020, Rugby Canada Hall of Fame inductee
