= 2024 in rugby union =

The following were rugby union and rugby sevens events during 2024 throughout the world.

== Rugby union ==
=== 2024 Six Nations Championship ===
- February 2 & 3: Round 1
  - France vs. Ireland at Stade Vélodrome
  - Italy vs. England at Stadio Olimpico
  - Wales vs. Scotland at Millennium Stadium
- February 10 & 11: Round 2
  - Scotland vs. France at Murrayfield Stadium
  - England vs. Wales at Twickenham Stadium
  - Ireland vs. Italy at Aviva Stadium
- February 24 & 25: Round 3
  - Ireland vs. Wales at Aviva Stadium
  - Scotland vs. England at Murrayfield Stadium
  - France vs. Italy at Decathlon Arena
- March 9 & 10: Round 4
  - Italy vs. Scotland at Stadio Olimpico
  - England vs. Ireland at Twickenham Stadium
  - Wales vs. France at Millennium Stadium
- March 16: Round 5
  - Wales vs. Italy at Millennium Stadium
  - Ireland vs. Scotland at Aviva Stadium
  - France vs. England at Groupama Stadium

=== 2024 Women's Six Nations Championship ===
- March 23 & 24: Round 1
  - France vs. Ireland at Stade Marie-Marvingt
  - Wales vs. Scotland at Cardiff Arms Park
  - Italy vs. England at Stadio Sergio Lanfranchi
- March 30 & 31: Round 2
  - Scotland vs. France at Edinburgh Rugby Stadium
  - England vs. Wales at Ashton Gate
  - Ireland vs. Italy at RDS Arena
- April 13 & 14: Round 3
  - Scotland vs. England at Edinburgh Rugby Stadium
  - Ireland vs. Wales at Musgrave Park
  - France vs. Italy at Stade Jean-Bouin
- April 20 & 21: Round 4
  - England vs. Ireland at Twickenham Stadium
  - Italy vs. Scotland at Stadio Sergio Lanfranchi
  - Wales vs. France at Cardiff Arms Park
- April 17: Round 5
  - Wales vs. Italy at Millennium Stadium
  - Ireland vs. Scotland at Ravenhill Stadium
  - France vs. England at Stade Chaban-Delmas

=== Rugby Europe ===
- February 3 – March 17: (Belgium) / (Georgia (country)) / (Germany) / (Netherlands) / (Poland) / (Portugal) / (Romania) / (Spain) 2024 Rugby Europe Championship
- February 3 – April 12: (Netherlands) / (Spain) / (Portugal) / (Sweden) 2024 Rugby Europe Women's Championship
- October 28, 2023 – April 13: (Croatia) / (Czech Republic) / (Lithuania) / (Sweden) / (Switzerland) / (Ukraine) 2023–24 Rugby Europe Trophy

Club competitions

- December 8, 2023 – May 25: (England) / (France) / (Ireland) / (Scotland) / (South Africa) / (Wales) 2023–24 European Rugby Champions Cup (final in (England) London)
- December 8, 2023 – May 24: (England) / (France) / (Georgia (country)) / (Ireland) / (Italy) / (Scotland) / (South Africa) / (Wales) 2023–24 EPCR Challenge Cup (final in (England) London)

=== WXV ===
- September 27 – October 13: 2024 WXV in Canada,South Africa & United Arab Emirates

=== Domestic league seasons (incomplete) ===
First division

Nation	League	Champion	Second place	Title	Last honour
United States	2024 Major League Rugby season				
England	2023–24 Premiership Rugby				
France	2023–24 Top 14 season				
Wales	2023–24 Indigo Group Premiership				

== Rugby sevens ==
=== 2023–24 SVNS ===
- December 2–3, 2023: Dubai Sevens in (United Arab Emirates) Dubai
  - Men's Winners: South Africa
  - Women's Winners: Australia
- December 9–10, 2023: South Africa Sevens in Cape Town
  - Men's Winners: Argentina
  - Women's Winners: Australia
- January 26–28: Australia Sevens in Perth
  - Men's Winners: Argentina
  - Women's Winners: Ireland
- February 23–25: Canada Sevens in Vancouver
  - Men's Winners: Argentina
  - Women's Winners: New Zealand
- March 2–3: USA Sevens in (United States) Los Angeles
  - Men's Winners: France
  - Women's Winners: New Zealand
- April 5–7: Hong Kong Sevens in Hong Kong
- May 3–5: Singapore Sevens in Singapore
- May 31 – June 2: Spain Sevens in Madrid

=== 2024 World Rugby HSBC Sevens Challenger ===
==== Men's tour ====
- January 12–14: Event#1 in (United Arab Emirates) Dubai
  - Winners: Kenya
- March 8–10: Event#2 in Montevideo
  - Winners: Uruguay
- May 18–19: Event#3 in (Germany) Munich

==== Women's tour ====
- January 12–14: Event#1 in (United Arab Emirates) Dubai
  - Winners: China
- March 8–10: Event#2 in (Uruguay) Montevideo
  - Winners: China
- May 18–19: Event#3 in (Poland) Kraków
