= 2016 in rugby union =

This page covers the major events of 2016 in rugby union.

== International tournaments ==
- 6 February – 6 March: 2016 Americas Rugby Championship, won by Argentina XV
- 11–19 November: 2016 Cup of Nations, won by Russia
- 9–18 June: 2016 World Rugby Nations Cup, won by Romania

=== Northern hemisphere national teams ===
- February 6 – March 19: 2016 Six Nations Championship, won by England
- Autumn 2014 – Spring 2016: 2014–16 European Nations Cup First Division, won by (Georgia (country)) Georgia
- 5 March – 1 October: 2016 Rugby Americas North Championship, won by Mexico
- 30 April – 4 June: 2016 Asia Rugby Championship in Hong Kong, Japan and South Korea; won by Japan

=== Southern hemisphere national teams ===
- March 8–21: 2016 World Rugby Pacific Challenge, won by Fiji Warriors
- 20 August – 8 October: 2016 Rugby Championship, won by New Zealand
- July 18 – August 3: 2016 World Rugby Pacific Nations Cup, won by Fiji
- May 7 – June 4: 2016 Sudamérica Rugby Cup, won by Argentina

== Club tournaments ==
=== Northern hemisphere clubs ===
- 13 November 2015 – 14 May 2016: 2015–16 European Rugby Champions Cup, won by (England) Saracens
- 12 November 2015 – 13 May 2016: 2015–16 European Rugby Challenge Cup, won by (France) Montpellier Hérault Rugby
- 5 September 2015 – 28 May 2016: 2015–16 Pro12, won by (Ireland) Connacht
- 22 August 2015 – 24 June 2016: 2015–16 Top 14 season, won by (France) Racing 92
- 16 October 2015 – 28 May 2016: 2015–16 Aviva Premiership, won by (England) Saracens

=== Southern hemisphere clubs ===
- February 26 – August 6: 2016 Super Rugby season, won by (New Zealand) Hurricanes

== Youth tournaments ==
- April 19 – May 1: 2016 World Rugby Under 20 Trophy in Zimbabwe, won by Samoa
- 3–7 May: 2016 Oceania Rugby Under 20 Championship in Australia and New Zealand, won by New Zealand
- June 7–25: 2016 World Rugby Under 20 Championship in England, won by England
- 11–17 December: 2016 U-19 Asia Rugby Championship in Malaysia, won by Hong Kong

== Women's rugby ==
- 5 February – 20 March: 2016 Women's Six Nations Championship, won by France
- 6–15 October: 2016 Women's European Championship in Spain, won by Spain
- 6–8 August: Rugby sevens at the 2016 Summer Olympics – Women's tournament, won by Australia

== Rugby sevens ==
- 4 Dec 2015 – 22 May 2016: 2015–16 World Rugby Sevens Series, won by Fiji
- 9–11 August: Rugby sevens at the 2016 Summer Olympics – Men's tournament, won by Fiji

== See also ==
- 2016 in sports
