= 2010 in rugby union =

Here are the match results of the 2010 Rugby union season. Qualifiers for the 2011 Rugby World Cup, meanwhile the Six Nations Championship and the Tri Nations are set for another season.

== International tournaments ==
=== Worldwide ===
- 116th Six Nations Championship series is won by France who complete the Grand Slam.
- March 8 – The Celtic League and Italian Rugby Federation confirm the entry of two Italian teams, Aironi and Benetton Treviso, into the previously Celtic competition in 2010–11.
- May 18–30 – The 2010 IRB Junior World Rugby Trophy was held at several sites in Moscow, Russia and won by Italy.
- May 22 – Toulouse win their fourth Heineken Cup, defeating fellow French side Biarritz 21–19 in the Heineken Cup Final at Stade de France in Saint-Denis.
- May 23 – Cardiff Blues win the Amlin Challenge Cup Final at Stade Vélodrome in Marseille 28–21 over nearby French club Toulon.
- May 29 – The last Super 14 Final before the competition expands to 15 teams is won by the Bulls, who defeat fellow South African side Stormers 25–17 at Orlando Stadium in Soweto.
- May 30 – Samoa win the Edinburgh Sevens and secure their first IRB Sevens World Series season crown.
- May 30, – June 26, – The 2010 Summer Tours start.
- June 5–21 – The 2010 IRB Junior World Championship was held at three sites in Argentina and won by New Zealand.
- August 20, – September 5, – 2010 Women's Rugby World Cup was held at two sites in London, England and won by New Zealand.
- October 23, – December 18, – The 2010 end-of-year series takes place. Notable events during this series include:
  - November 13: Victor Matfield earned his 103rd cap to become South Africa's most-capped player ever.
  - November 20: Richie McCaw and Mils Muliaina earned their 93rd caps, becoming New Zealand's most-capped players.
  - November 27: The 2011 Rugby World Cup qualification process concluded in Bucharest with Romania defeating Uruguay 39–12. Romania won the two-legged tie 60–33 on aggregate to claim the final spot in the 2011 Rugby World Cup.
  - November 27: Dan Carter of New Zealand surpassed Jonny Wilkinson of England as the leading career point scorer in Test rugby.

Domestic competitions

- (England) Guinness Premiership – Leicester Tigers
- (France) Top 14 – Clermont win their first title in their nearly 100-year history after having lost in 10 previous championship finals.
- (Ireland) (Scotland) (Wales) Celtic League – Ospreys
- (England) (Wales) LV= Cup (Anglo-Welsh Cup) – Northampton Saints
- ITM Cup (formerly Air New Zealand Cup) – Canterbury
- (South Africa) Currie Cup – Sharks

== See also ==
- 2010 in sports
