= Zoe Harrison =

England international rugby union player and qualified teacher

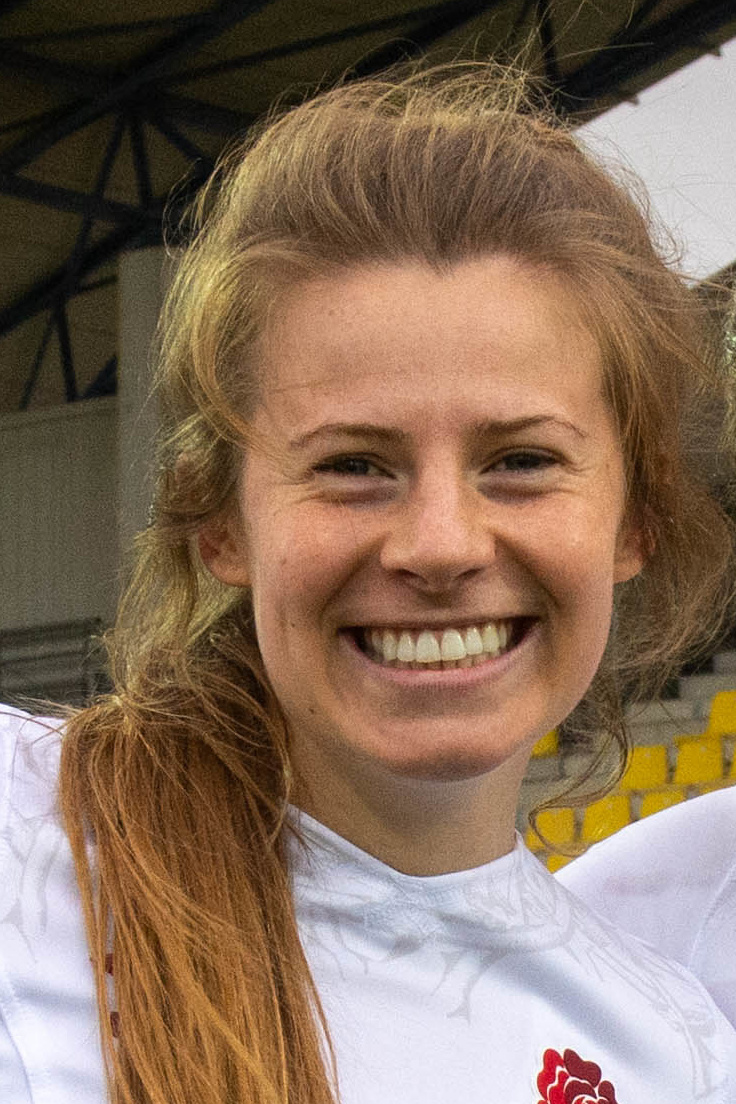
- Harrison in 2022
- Full name: Zoe Eloise Harrison
- Born: 14 April 1998 (age 28)
- Height: 173 cm (5 ft 8 in)
- Weight: 73 kg (161 lb)

Rugby union career
- Position: Fly-half / Centre
- Current team: Saracens Women
Senior career
| Years | Team | Apps | (Points) |
| 2016– | Saracens | | |
International career
| Years | Team | Apps | (Points) |
| 2016–2018 | England U20s | | |
| 2017– | England | 70 | (301) |
National sevens team
| Years | Team | | Comps |
| 2015 | England U18s | | |
Medal record
Women's rugby union
Representing England
Rugby World Cup
| Gold medal – first place | 2025 England | Team competition |
| Silver medal – second place | 2021 New Zealand | Team competition |

Zoe Eloise Harrison (born 14 April 1998) is an English professional rugby union footballer who plays for England and Saracens. She made her international debut for England in 2017 and won the 2025 World Cup.

== International career ==
Harrison first played for the England women's national rugby team in 2017, when she made three appearances in the autumn internationals. Her first game was against Canada: England won 79–5.

She was awarded a full-time England contract in January 2019. The same year, she played in all five games of the 2019 Women's Six Nations Championships and started the final three games as England won the Grand Slam.

Also in 2019, Harrison made appearances in all of England's Super Series matches in San Diego.

In 2020, she played each of the side's 2020 Women's Six Nations matches. On 1 April 2021 it was announced that Harrison was omitted from the England team for their 2021 Women's Six Nations Championship opening game against Italy Women due to a breach of COVID-19 regulations. Harrison had forgotten to sign in to the COVID-19 app used to monitor the team and staff's well-being three times; England head coach Simon Middleton confirmed there would be no carry-over in the punishment.

She returned in April 2021 to play England's post-Six Nations friendly test against France. The game ended after 62 minutes due to floodlight failure, but England were declared the winners with 17 points against France's 15. She was named in the England squad for the delayed 2021 Rugby World Cup held in New Zealand in October and November 2022.

On 17 March 2025, she was called up into the Red Roses side for the Six Nations Championship. She played for England at the 2025 Rugby World Cup as the starting fly-half. In the final, she successfully kicked four conversions as England defeated Canada 33-13 to win the World Cup.

Playing in the 2026 Six Nations Championship, Harrison successfully kicked 29 out of 31 conversion as England extended their unbeaten run to 38 matches and won a fifth consecutive grand slam in the event. In October 2026, Harrison was nominated for Women’s 15s Player of the Year by World Rugby.

== Club career ==
Harrison made her senior rugby debut during the 2016–17 season with Saracens Women, where she was then named players’ player of the year. She started both the 2018 and 2019 Tyrrells Premier 15s finals for Saracens, scoring two tries in the 2019 final in an 18-point individual haul to help the club win back-to-back titles.

In 2020, she signed a new deal with Saracens, where she continues to play.

== Early life and education ==
Harrison started playing rugby at five years old at Tring. Her father, John, represented Wales at schoolboys' level rugby and her brother, Alex, has played for Wasps reserves.

Despite suffering bullying from other students she continued to play rugby throughout her teens. At 14, she was drafted into the England Women talent development group. She moved to Welwyn to play U15s and U16s rugby and has played for Hertfordshire County and South East at this level. She went on to represent England in the European U18s 7s Championships, which the team won, and to play for the England U20s team.

She attended Middlesex University and achieved a qualification in Sports Rehabilitation and Exercise and previously studied at Hartpury College on the AASE Girls Rugby Programme.

Harrison is currently an ambassador for Umbro.

== Honours ==
England

- Women's Rugby World Cup
  - (gold) Champion (1): 2025
