= Women's Premiership =

Top level of women's rugby union in England

- Sport: Rugby union
- Instituted: 1990
- Ceased: 2017
- Replaced by: Premier 15s
- Country: England (RFUW)
- Most titles: Richmond, Saracens (5 titles)

The Women's Premiership, also called the RFUW Premiership was the top level of women's rugby union in England until 2017.

It was formed in 1990 and was run by the Rugby Football Union for Women. It was superseded in the 2017/18 season by Premier 15s.

== History ==
The Women's Premiership was formed in 1990 as the top tier of women's rugby in the British Isles at a time when women's rugby in England was run by the Women's Rugby Football Union on a British Isles-wide basis.

In 1994, the Rugby Football Union for Women was formed and took over the management of women's rugby in England, including the Women's Premiership, after Scotland, Ireland and Wales left the Women's Rugby Football Union. At the start, most of the teams in the league were University teams. Since the RFUW took over and professionalism was permitted in 1996, university teams were gradually replaced by women's clubs associated with professional and semi-professional men's clubs as they were able to give a women's team the funding to be able to compete.

Promotion and relegation in the Women's Premiership was determined by the lowest placed team playing against the winner of the Championship 1 North-South playoff. If the Premiership team won, there was no promotion and relegation that year. It is noted that promoted teams often failed to win during the regular league season during their first season in the Women's Premiership, including Old Albanians Ladies and Thurrock T-Birds, who were relegated in 2013 after losing to Aylesford Bulls Ladies in the 2013 playoff.

During seasons that preceded the Women's Rugby World Cup, promotion and relegation was suspended for that season. In 2014, Thurrock appealed against this ruling to the RFUW, claiming that some Women's Premiership clubs were actively attempting to block promotion and relegation in Women's Rugby World Cup years.

=== Premier 15s ===
For the 2017–18 season the RFU Council proposed to create a Super League, the Premier 15s with up to ten teams. The new system was to be considered new and distinct from the existing Premiership. It was expected that all 8 teams from the Premiership would apply for the new league, together with several top Championship teams. Seven of the eight Premiership teams were accepted into the Super Rugby competition (Lichfield being excluded), together with Gloucester–Hartpury, Firwood Waterloo and Loughborough Students (Lightning).

== Clubs ==
The map illustrates the locations of the teams that participated in the 2013-14 Women's Premiership.

Locations of the 2013–14 Women's Premiership teams

Competing clubs in the Women's Premiership have included:

| Seasons | Team | Dates |
|---|---|---|
| 4 | Aylesford Bulls Ladies | 2014-2017 |
| 1 | Blaydon Ladies | 2007 |
| 13 | Bristol Ladies (Note: Bristol Ladies was called Clifton Ladies RFC until 2008) | 2003-2005, 2008–2017 |
| 11 | Darlington Mowden Park Sharks (Note: Darlington Mowden Park Sharks was called Thirsk Sharks until 2006) | 2004-2006, 2010-2017 |
| 5 | Henley Ladies | 2003-2007 |
| 15 | Lichfield Ladies | 2003-2017 |
| 2 | Old Albanians Ladies | 2011-2012 |
| 15 | Richmond Women | 2003-2017 |
| 15 | Saracens Women | 2003-2017 |
| 3 | Team Northumbria Ladies | 2008-2010 |
| 1 | Thurrock T-Birds | 2013 |
| 2 | Vale of Lune Ladies | 2006-2007 |
| 15 | Wasps Ladies | 2003-2017 |
| 15 | Worcester Valkyries Ladies | 2003-2017 |

Dates are the year the season ended.

== Champions ==
| Season | (gold) Champions | Final | Runners–up (silver) | Relegated |
|---|---|---|---|---|
| 1990-91 | | | | |
| 1991-92 | | | | |
| 1992-93 | Saracens Women | | | |
| 1993-94 | Saracens Women | | | |
| 1994-95 | | | | |
| 1995-96 | Saracens Women | | | |
| 1996-97 | | | | |
| 1997-98 | Saracens Women | | | |
| 1998-99 | Saracens Women | | | |
| 1999-00 | Saracens Women | | | |
| 2000-01 | | | | |
| 2001-02 | Saracens Women | | | |
| 2002-03 | Wasps Ladies | | | |
| 2003-04 | Wasps Ladies | | | |
| 2004-05 | Wasps Ladies | | | |
| 2005-06 | Saracens Women | | | |
| 2006-07 | Saracens Women | | | |
| 2007-08 | Saracens Women | | | |
| 2008-09 | Saracens Women | | | |
| 2009-10 | Richmond Women | | | |
| 2010-11 | Richmond Women | | | |
| 2011-12 | Richmond Women | | | |
| 2012-13 | Worcester Valkyries | | | |
| 2013-14 | Richmond Women | | | |
| 2014-15 | Saracens Women | | | |
| 2015-16 | Richmond Women | | | |
| 2016-17 | Aylesford Bulls Ladies | | | |

=== Summary of Winners ===
| # | Team | Champions | Years as champions | Runners-up | Years as runners-up | Top of league table |
|---|---|---|---|---|---|---|
| 1 | Richmond Women | 5 | 2009-10, 2010-11, 2011-12, 2013-14, 2015-16 | | | |
| 1 | Saracens Women | 5 | 2005-5, 2006-7, 2007-8, 2008-9, 2014-15 | | | |
| 3 | Wasps Ladies | 3 | 2002-3, 2003-4, 2004-5 | | | |
| 4 | Worcester Valkyries Ladies | 1 | 2012-13 | | | |
| 4 | Aylesford Bulls Ladies | 1 | 2016-17 | | | |
