= 1986 Great Britain v France women's rugby union match =

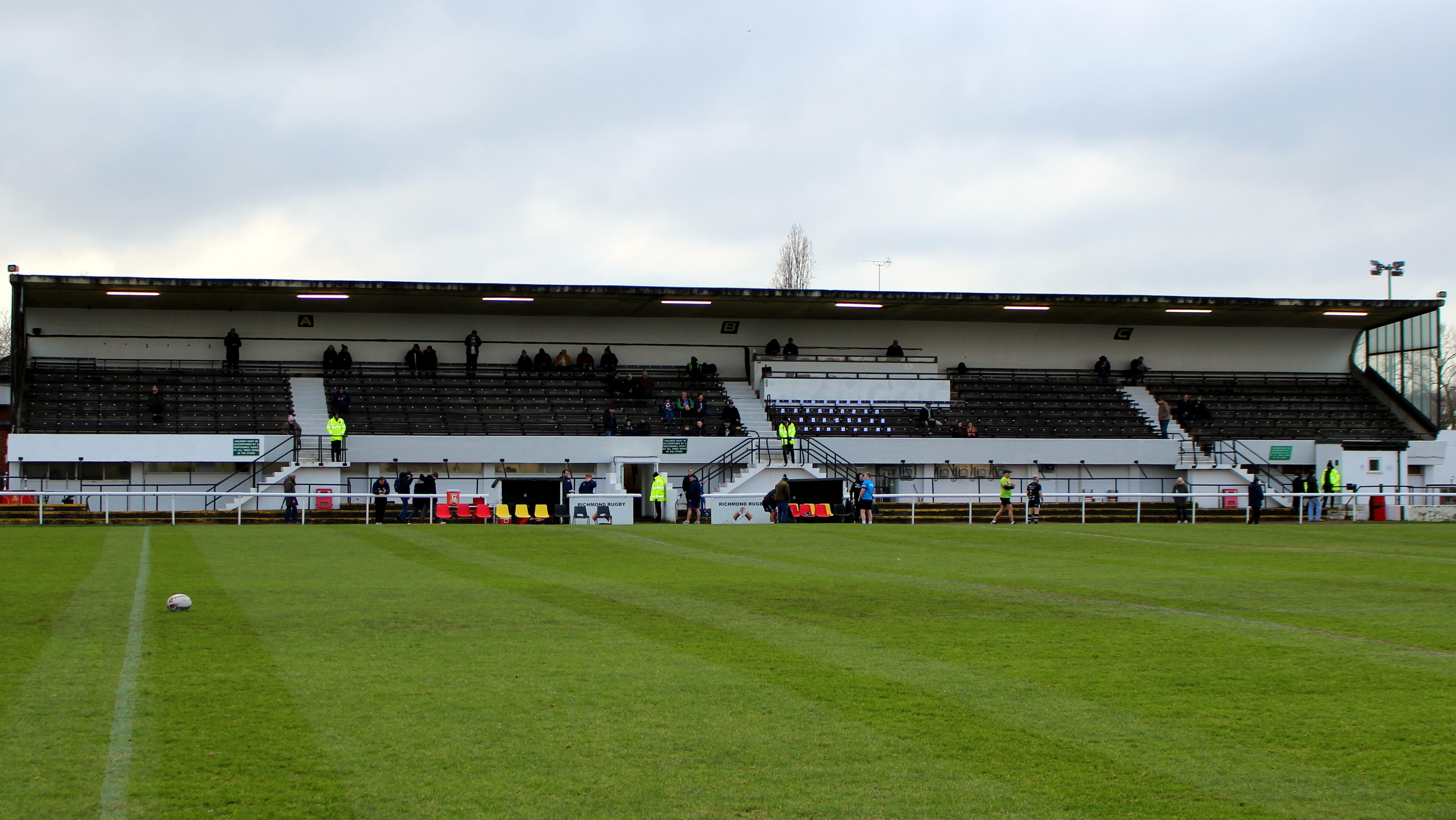
- Richmond Athletic Ground, venue of the match
- Event: Women's rugby union international
Great Britain	France
(United Kingdom)	(France)
8 (2T)	14 (3T 1C)
- Date: 19 April 1986
- Venue: Richmond Athletic Ground, London
- Referee: C. Leek (East Midlands)
- Attendance: 800

The 1986 Great Britain v France women's rugby union match was the first women's international rugby union match held on British soil, taking place at the Richmond Athletic Ground in London on 19 April 1986.

The match brought together a Great Britain representative side, selected from England, Wales, Scotland and Ireland, and a more experienced France team. France won 14–8, scoring three tries to Great Britain's two, both of which were scored by Karen Almond.

Staged at a time when the women's game remained largely amateur and loosely organised, the fixture has since been regarded as a foundational moment in the development of international women's rugby union.

== Overview ==
The match was organised during a formative period for women's rugby union in Britain. The Women's Rugby Football Union (WRFU), founded in 1983, had only recently begun to bring structure to a game that was still largely centred on universities and a small number of clubs. In this context, the Great Britain side was assembled as a representative team drawing players from across England, Wales, Scotland and Ireland, reflecting the absence of fully established national teams at that time.

Contemporary reporting emphasised the historic significance of the fixture, describing it as the first women's rugby international to be played in Britain. It was also seen as an opportunity to challenge scepticism surrounding the women's game and to demonstrate its quality to a wider audience. Despite limited resources and organisational challenges, the match attracted a crowd of around 800 spectators and generated considerable interest, marking an important step forward in the sport’s visibility and development.

== Match summary ==
France, who had already gained experience in international fixtures, began the match strongly and dominated the early exchanges, particularly in the scrum. Their forward strength allowed them to force Great Britain off the ball and score the opening try.

Great Britain gradually settled into the match, improving their scrummaging and developing a more fluid attacking game. Their response came through Karen Almond, who finished a move initiated by scrum-half Suzy Hill to level the scores. Almond added a second try later in the half from a blind-side move, giving Great Britain an 8–4 lead at half-time.

In the second half, France reasserted their control, with their greater experience proving decisive. A try from winger A. Fenoll brought the sides level before a late score by Pagegie secured a 14–8 victory. France’s earlier try, along with those from Fenoll and Pagegie, and a conversion by Annick Hayraud, completed the scoring.

Although Great Britain were ultimately defeated, Almond’s two tries remained their only scores, and the match was widely regarded as competitive and of a high standard, reinforcing its importance in the development of the women's game.

== Match details ==
19 April 1986

Great Britain	8 – 14	France
Try: 24' Almond; 36' Almond (2)		Try: 2' Gracieux; 45' A. Fenoll; 76' Pagegie; Con: 77' Hayraud

Richmond Athletic Ground, London
Referee: Clive Leek (East Midlands)
Touch judges: = Sarah George (North Midlands)
Frances Sweeney (Herts)

== Teams ==
FB	Val Moore (Wasps)
W	Pip Atkinson (Loughborough University)
C	Sam Robson (Loughborough)
C	Amanda Bennett (Loughborough)
W	Debbie McLaren (Finchley)
FH	Karen Almond (Wasps)
SH	Suzy Hill (Wasps)
F	Jane Talbot (Swansea University)
F	Kiki Lee (Loughborough)
F	Jayne Watts (Finchley)
F	Trish Durkin (Bromley)
F	Tricia Moore (Finchley)
F	Janet Gedrych (Finchley)
F	Carol Isherwood (c) (Leeds University)
F	Liza Burgess (Loughborough)

FB	Christiane Fenoll (Tulle)
W	Fabienne Saudin (Le Creusot)
C	Monique Fraysse (c) (Toulouse)
C	Sylvie Rival (La Teste)
W	Annette Fenoll (Tulle)
FH	Annick Hayraud (Romagnat)
SH	Marie Gracieux (La Teste)
F	Véronique Champeil (Tulle)
F	Michelle Lugrand (La Teste)
F	Sylvie Girard (Bourg)
F	Pascale Merlin (Le Creusot)
F	Christelle Henry (Bourg)
F	Nathalie Amiel (Narbonne)
F	Brigitte Pagegie (Tulle)
F	Carinne Marbleu (La Teste)

== Legacy ==
In retrospect, the match has come to be seen as a pioneering moment in the history of women's rugby union. It marked the emergence of international competition in Britain and demonstrated the viability of representative women's teams at a time when the sport lacked formal structures and institutional support.

The Great Britain side continued to operate between 1986 and 1990, playing a number of international fixtures before the later establishment of independent national teams. The experience gained during this period helped lay important foundations for the subsequent development of women's international rugby in England, Wales, Scotland and Ireland, with England and Wales playing their first internationals in 1987, while Scotland and Ireland followed in 1993.

Many of the players involved in the 1986 match went on to play significant roles in the early international game, including participation in the inaugural 1991 Women's Rugby World Cup. More broadly, later accounts have emphasised the amateur and pioneering nature of the team, whose players often took responsibility for organising fixtures, travel and logistics themselves, reflecting the limited resources available to the women's game at the time.
