= 1987 Wales v England women's rugby union match =

First England and Wales Women's international rugby union match
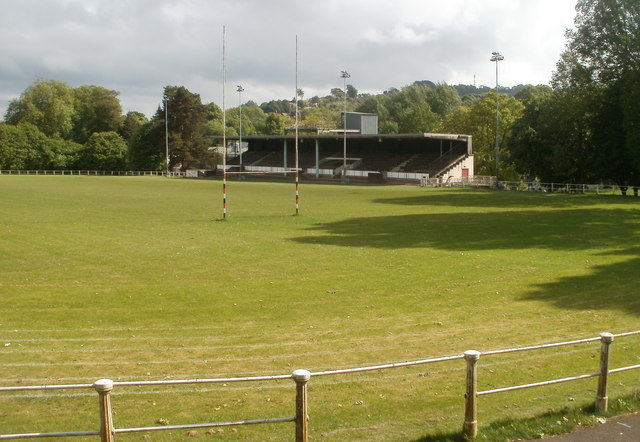
- Pontypool Park, venue of the match
- Event: Women's rugby union international
| Wales | England |
| (Wales) | (England) |
| 4 (1T) | 22 (5T 1C) |
- Date: 5 April 1987
- Venue: Pontypool Park, Pontypool
- Referee: Mike Allen (Wales)
- Attendance: ~2,000

The rugby union match played between Wales and England on 5 April 1987 was the first official international match for both the England women's national rugby union team and the Wales women's national rugby union team. The match was played at Pontypool Park in Pontypool, Wales, in front of approximately 2,000 spectators. England won 22–4, scoring five tries to Wales' one.

The fixture marked the beginning of the transition from earlier Great Britain representative teams to individual national teams.

== Overview ==
The match was organised at a time when women's rugby union was still largely amateur and run outside the structures of the established rugby union governing bodies. Players typically funded their own travel and equipment, and training opportunities were limited.

Contemporary reports described the occasion as historic, with the South Wales Echo noting that "history will be made" ahead of the fixture. Despite limited preparation, particularly on the Welsh side, the match attracted a crowd of nearly 2,000 spectators.

England entered the match with a more established structure and player base, drawing heavily from clubs such as Wasps Ladies, Richmond and Loughborough University. Wales selected players from university teams and local clubs including Swansea University, Magor and Pontypool RFC.

== Match summary ==
England won the match 22–4, with fly-half Karen Almond delivering a standout performance, scoring two tries and a conversion. England's backline displayed superior organisation and attacking structure, while Wales were noted for their resilience and defensive effort.

England opened the scoring after seven minutes when Almond capitalised on a loose pass near the Welsh line. She added a second try midway through the first half, finishing a looping move with Pip Atkinson.

Atkinson scored twice, including a long-range try "on half time" to give England a 12–0 lead at the interval. She added a second try early in the second half following a kick ahead by Almond.

Wales responded through captain Liza Burgess, who scored a pushover try during a period of second-half pressure.

England sealed victory with a late try from Carol Isherwood following a forward drive close to the line. Almond added the only successful conversion of the match.

=== Timeline ===
- 7 min – England try (Karen Almond)
- 26 min – England try (Karen Almond)
- 40 min – England try (Pip Atkinson)
- Half-time – England 12–0 Wales
- Early 2nd half – England try (Pip Atkinson)
- Mid 2nd half – Wales try (Liza Burgess)
- Late 2nd half – England try (Carol Isherwood)
- Conversion – Karen Almond

== Match details ==
5 April 1987

| Wales | 4 – 22 | England |
| Try: Burgess | | Try: Almond (2); Atkinson (2); Isherwood; Con: Almond |

Pontypool Park, Pontypool
Attendance: ~2,000
Referee: Mike Allen (Wales)

== Teams ==
| FB | Rhianna Morgan (Swansea University) |
| W | Fen Paw (Swansea University) |
| W | Rebecca Wyatt (Pontypool) |
| C | Sue Lovell (Magor) |
| C | Enid Davies (Magor) |
| FH | Amanda Bennett (Loughborough University) |
| SH | Sara Williams (Swansea University) |
| F | Elaine Shiffington (Swansea University) |
| F | Mary-Anne Harvey (South Glamorgan Institute) |
| F | Belinda Davies (Wasps) |
| F | Margery Farr (Blaenau Gwent) |
| F | Francis Margerison (Pontypool) |
| F | Helen Carey (Swansea Uplands) |
| F | Jane Rosser (Magor) |
| F | Liza Burgess (c) (Loughborough University) |

Replacements: Margaret Duncan (South Glamorgan Institute), Catherine Parish (Pontypool), Keithre Evans (Magor), Anita Watkins (Pontypool), Sian Newington (Loughborough), Janet Gedrych (Richmond)

| FB | Claire Willetts (Loughborough) |
| W | Pip Atkinson (Loughborough) |
| W | Debbie McLaren (Richmond) |
| C | Sam Robson (Loughborough) |
| C | Chris Gurney (Loughborough) |
| FH | Karen Almond (Wasps) |
| SH | Suzy Hill (Wasps) |
| F | Jane Pauley (Richmond) |
| F | Nicola Ponsford (Loughborough) |
| F | Jane Watts (Richmond) |
| F | Liz Whalley (Leeds) |
| F | Tricia King (Exeter) |
| F | Sally Cockerell (Loughborough) |
| F | Carol Isherwood (c) (Wasps) |
| F | Sally Treadwell (Wasps) |

Replacements: Fiona Hackett (Loughborough), Susan Wachholz (Richmond), Janis Ross (Richmond), Deirdre Mills (Richmond), Val Moore (Wasps), Pat Harris (Richmond)

For England, only Deirdre Mills and Pat Harris (originally not listed in some contemporary reports) were used and awarded caps.

== Legacy ==
The match is recognised by England Rugby as the first official international fixture of the England women's team, later known as the Red Roses. It also marked the first international appearance of the Wales women's team. It represents a key moment in the development of women's rugby union, bridging the earlier era of Great Britain representative teams and the establishment of national sides. Several players involved went on to play further international rugby, while others were part of the emerging structure that would lead to the inaugural 1991 Women's Rugby World Cup.
