= 1994 Women's Rugby World Cup final =

Rugby match between England and the U.S.

1994 Women's Rugby World Cup Final
- Event: 1994 Women's Rugby World Cup
England	United States
(England)	(United States)
38	23
- Date: 24 April 1994
- Venue: Edinburgh Academicals RFC, Edinburgh
- Referee: Jim Fleming (Scotland)
- Attendance: 5000

The 1994 Women's Rugby World Cup Final was a rugby union match to decide the winner of the 1994 Women's Rugby World Cup. The match was between 1991 finalists England and the United States, it took place on 24 April. England claimed their first title after beating the United States 38–23 in the Final.

== Route to the final ==
England
Round
United States
Opponent
Result
Pool stage
Opponent
Result
Russia
66–0
Match 1
Sweden
111–0
Scotland
26–0
Match 2
Japan
121–0

Team	Won	Drawn	Lost	For	Against
England	2	0	0	92	0
Scotland	1	0	1	51	26
Russia	0	0	2	0	117

Final standing

Team	Won	Drawn	Lost	For	Against
United States	2	0	0	232	0
Japan	1	0	1	10	126
Sweden	0	0	2	5	121

Opponent
Result
Knockout stage
Opponent
Result
Canada
24–10
Quarter-finals
Ireland
76–0
France
18–6
Semi-finals
Wales
56–15

England was placed in Pool B with Scotland and Russia. The defending champions, USA, were pooled with Japan and Sweden. The United States pool games was a one-sided affair as they annihilated both oppositions with nothing short of a hundred. First, was Sweden with a 111–0 trouncing, then USA beat Japan with an abysmal 121–0.

England's opponents in the Pool games also went scoreless. Russia went down 66–0 while Scotland put up a bit of a fight with the English only scoring 26 points.

== Match ==
24 April 1994

England	38–23	United States
Try: Penalty (2); Jane Mitchell; Gill Burns; Jacquie Edwards; Con: Karen Almond (5/5); Pen: Karen Almond		Try: Jen Crawford (2); Patricia Jervey; Elise Huffer; Pen: Jos Bergman

Edinburgh Academicals RFC

FB	15	Jane Mitchell
RW	14	Val Blackett
OC	13	Jacquie Edwards
IC	12	Giselle Prangnell
LW	11	Annie Cole
FH	10	Karen Almond (capt)
SH	9	Emma Mitchel
N8	8	Gill Burns
OF	7	Genevieve Shore
BF	6	Janis Ross (vice-capt)
RL	5	Heather Stirrup
LL	4	Sarah Wenn
TP	3	Sandy Ewing
HK	2	Nicky Ponsford
LP	1	Jane Mangham
Coach:
Steve Dowling

FB	15	Jen Crawford
RW	11	Krista McFarren
OC	13	Candi Orsini
IC	12	Elise Huffer
LW	14	Patty Jervey
FH	10	Jos Bergman
SH	9	Patty Connell
N8	8	Barbara Bond
OF	7	Laurie Spicer-Bourdon
BF	6	Jan Rutkowski
RL	5	Tara Flanagan
LL	4	Sheri Hunt
TP	3	Mary-Anne Sorensen
HK	2	Julie Gray
LP	1	Annie Flavin
Coach:
Franck Boivert

=== Summary ===
England had their revenge after they beat the United States 38–23. English captain Karen Almond kicked in 13 points with flanker Gill Burns, centre Jacquie Edwards and full-back Jane Mitchell scoring a try each, alongside two penalty tries to help England claim their first World Cup title.
