= Giselle Mather =

England rugby union player

Giselle Mather (nee Prangnell)
- Born: 19 April 1966 (age 60) Dartford
- Height: 1.68 m (5 ft 6 in)
- Weight: 59 kg (130 lb)
- School: Bruton School for Girls
- University: University of Exeter

Rugby union career
- Position(s): Centre; Full-back; Fly-half
Amateur team(s)
Years	Team	Apps	(Points)
1988–1990	Teddington Ladies		
1990-1992	Richmond Ladies		
1992-1998	Wasps Ladies		
1998-1999	Teddington Ladies		
International career
Years	Team	Apps	(Points)
1990-1997	England	34	
Medal record
Women's rugby union
Representing England
Rugby World Cup
Gold medal – first place	1994 England	Team competition
Silver medal – second place	1991 England	Team competition
Bronze medal – third place	1998 England	Team competition

Giselle Mather (née Prangnell) is an English rugby coach and former rugby union international. She was part of the 1994 Women's World Cup winning side and became the first woman to earn Rugby Football Union (RFU) Level 3 and 4 coaching qualifications. She has led both women's and men's teams to considerable success and is the current coach of the Great Britain women's national rugby sevens team.

== Early life and education ==
Giselle Ginette Prangnell was born in 1966 in Dartford, England. She is the middle child of John Prangnell and Geraldine Clark, who married in Bristol in 1962. She has an older sister, Samantha (born in 1965), and a younger brother, Simon (born in 1968).

Mather developed a love for sports from an early age, initially inspired by footballer Steve Coppell and started to support Manchester United. A trip to Wembley Stadium in 1978 to watch England play Brazil further ignited her passion for representing her country in sports. She explored multiple disciplines, including netball, judo, fencing (where she became South West under-18 champion), hockey (representing South West England), football, and cricket.

She attended the University of Exeter, where she was one of the few women admitted to its physical education program. When female students were expected to study dance instead of rugby, she resisted, choosing instead to observe rugby training sessions and take detailed notes. This decision set her on the path to a career in rugby, despite never having formally played the sport at that time.

== Playing career ==
=== Club Rugby ===
Mather's first playing experience came at an invitational Sevens tournament, where she suffered a burst blood vessel in her eye. However, it wasn't until her hometown club, Teddington, established a women's team that she began playing regularly and became a member of their first ever team.

During university, Mather managed to balance her commitments to both hockey (which she played for Exeter) and rugby. Every weekend, she would take the train from Exeter to London to play for Teddington, with the club covering her travel expenses. Her routine involved playing hockey for the university on Saturdays, then traveling to London on Sundays for rugby matches.

Despite playing in the third tier of English rugby with Teddington, Mather's talent quickly caught the attention of the national selectors, leading to her invitation to an England training camp. Mather believes that her athletic ability and skills from other sports—such as the catch-pass from netball, kicking from football, tactical awareness from hockey, and footwork from fencing, helped her stand out.

Her first major test came at an England camp under renowned coach Jim Greenwood, who was harsh on her for dropping a ball during training. The experience left a lasting impression, pushing her to improve rapidly. Greenwood even later offered her a place at Loughborough University, a major center for rugby excellence.

Realizing she needed to play at a higher level to progress internationally, Mather moved to Richmond Ladies, one of the country's top women's clubs, where she played for two seasons. She then transferred to Wasps Ladies, based in Sudbury, where she played from 1992 to 1998.

She returned to Teddington for the 1998-99 season, fulfilling a long-standing promise to finish her playing career there. Shortly afterward, she moved into coaching, beginning her transition into one of the most respected rugby coaches in the game.

=== International career ===
Mather earned the first of her 34 England caps in 1991 against the Netherlands, as part of preparations for the inaugural Women's Rugby World Cup later that year. Though she had spent the previous three years as a reserve, she was selected to start that match to help the team adjust to playing without their star fly-half, Karen Almond. England won 26-0, with Mather contributing points through her kicking.

Her second cap came in the 1991 World Cup final, where England lost 19-6 to the USA. Mather was substituted in at fullback after an injury to Jane Mitchell, marking her introduction to high-pressure international rugby.

Mather then became a regular in the England squad forming a strong midfield partnership with Karen Almond, playing at inside center. In 1994, she was part of the England squad that faced the USA again in the Women's Rugby World Cup final, this time securing victory 38-23 at Edinburgh Academicals.

The win also brought increased visibility for women's rugby, with England's triumph earning a 15-minute feature on the BBC sports programme Grandstand, extensive newspaper coverage, and an invitation to Buckingham Palace.

=== Playing career summary ===
- 1989 - 1998 - England women's national rugby union team - 34 England Caps
  - World Cup Champions 1994
  - World Cup Runners up 1991
  - World Cup 3rd place 1998
  - European Champions 1996
  - Five Nations Grand Slam Winners 1995, 1996
- 1988 - 1989 - Teddington Antlers
- 1990 - 1992 - Richmond Ladies
- 1992 - 1998 - Wasps Ladies
- 1998 - 1999 - Teddington Antlers

== Coaching career ==
Following her retirement as a player, Giselle Mather immediately transitioned into coaching, beginning with Wasps Ladies. Mather soon became the first woman to earn the RFU Level 3 (2002) and Level 4 (2008) coaching qualifications.

From 2001 to 2004, Mather served as head coach of Wasps Ladies, leading the team to back-to-back Premiership titles in 2003 and 2004. She then joined the England set-up and as England Senior Women's Backs Coach helped guide the team to Grand Slam success in 2006 as well as getting to the World Cup final in the same year where they were Runners Up. She then became England Women U20s Head Coach and was unbeaten in three seasons.

This success led to an opportunity to become the first female coach of a men's team when Teddington offered her a role as coach of the senior men's team in 2008. A 62-game unbeaten streak followed with three consecutive promotions, and two Twickenham victories in the RFU National Junior Vase and Senior Vase competitions.

Concurrently, Mather had been hired by Toby Booth into the London Irish Academy, working with Elite Player Development Groups and managing the Advanced Apprenticeship in Sporting Excellence (AASE) program. Over a decade, she coached future international stars such as Alex Corbisiero, Anthony Watson, Jonathan Joseph and Marland Yarde. However, despite success in male coaching, extensive qualifications and experience, Mather watched male colleagues achieve promotion into senior coaching roles while she remained overlooked, and she decided to leave London Irish in 2015. Catherine Spencer described this is a "frustrating end to [Mather's] time at London Irish", for "one of the best coaches in the country".

That same year, the England Women's head coach position became available following the departure of Gary Street. Mather was widely seen as a leading candidate for the role. However, to widespread surprise, she was not even granted an interview. This prompted Mather to take a year-long break from coaching and allowed her to reassess her career.

In 2016, Mather returned to coaching as Director of Rugby at Wasps Women, guiding the club through its transition into the newly formed Premier 15s league. Under her leadership, Wasps made the playoffs in three out of five seasons. She remained at the club until 2022. During her time at Wasps, Mather was also asked to coach the inaugural Women's Barbarians team and guided them to victory against Munster in 2017.

In 2022, Mather was appointed Director of Women's Rugby at Ealing Trailfinders, tasked with building the women's program from the ground up. Under her leadership, Ealing secured their place in the Allianz Premier 15s, ensuring their participation in the top tier of English women's rugby. She also played a crucial role in player recruitment and development, helping to establish a competitive squad. Her tenure helped lay the foundations for Ealing's long-term ambitions in elite women's rugby, and she remained in the role until 2024.

In September 2024, Mather was appointed head coach of the Great Britain women's national rugby sevens team, marking her return to the international stage.

=== Teams coached ===
- 2001–2004 - Wasps Ladies – Head Coach, Premiership Champions (2003, 2004)
- 2004–06 - England Senior Women's Backs Coach - Grand Slam Winners 2006, Runners Up World Cup 2006
- 2006–09 - England U20s Head Coach - Unbeaten, U20s Nation Cup Champions back-to-back
- 2008-2012 - Teddington Antlers RFC (Men's team) – Head Coach - Three consecutive promotions from Surrey 2 to London 2, 62-game unbeaten run, two Twickenham victories (RFU National Junior Vase and Senior Vase Champions); Middlesex Cup Winners
- 2005–2015 - London Irish Academy – Elite Player Development Groups, AASE program
- 2016–2022 - Wasps Women – Director of Rugby, Premier 15s playoffs (3 seasons)
- 2017 - Women's Barbarians - first ever match
- 2022–2024 -Ealing Trailfinders Women – Director of Women's Rugby, established women's program
- September 2024– May 2025 - Great Britain women's national rugby sevens team – Head Coach

== Teaching career ==
Before transitioning to full-time coaching, Mather worked as a PE teacher. She taught at Shene School until 1996. Mather (then Prangnell) recalled raffle tickets being advertised at a school assembly to help fund the travel and accommodation for the World Cup trip. At the time of her World Cup triumph, Mather recalled returning to school and being met with an assembly of over 1,000 students cheering "Miss Prangnell" as a world champion, a moment that reinforced the impact of the achievement of the women's team. In 1996 she moved to Orleans Park School in Twickenham, where she also served as Head of Year 7. She took the Orleans Park School girls rugby squad to the London Heathrow Games in 1999, where they represented Richmond and won the gold medal.

== Personal life ==
Mather married Peter Mather, a former Teddington Antlers player, in May 1999 in Richmond upon Thames. The couple has three children: Jasper, Roxy, and Barny. When pursuing her Level 3 coaching course, then the only woman to have done so, Mather had to take her baby daughter Roxy on one coaching course because she was breast feeding. Mather went into labour with her third child, Barny, whilst coaching Wasps in an April 2004 league match against Richmond. She recalled having a "massive contraction and having to stop talking" half-way through the half-time team talk, but didn't leave for hospital until the match finished.
