= Sue Dorrington =

English rugby union player

- Born: 10 June 1958 (age 68) Minnesota, United States

Rugby union career
- Position(s): Centre, Hooker
Senior career
Years	Team	Apps	(Points)
1982 - 1983	Twin City Amazons		(0)
1984 - 1986	Finchley Women		(0)
1986 - 2000	Richmond Women		(0)
International career
Years	Team	Apps	(Points)
	Great Britain		(0)
1987 – 1997	England		(0)
Medal record
Representing England
Women's rugby union
Rugby World Cup
Gold medal – first place	1994 Scotland	Team competition
Silver medal – second place	1991 Wales	Team competition

Sue Dorrington (born 10 June 1958) is a former English rugby union player and pioneer of the women's game, in England and internationally.

== Biography ==
Dorrington was born and raised in Minnesota, USA. She started playing rugby in the early eighties and moved to London in 1983 for more competitive rugby. She played for Richmond Women and represented both Great Britain, and England in test matches.

Dorrington and three of her Richmond teammates — Deborah Griffin, Alice Cooper, and Mary Forsyth, organized the first Women's Rugby World Cup in Wales in 1991. She had to balance her role on the Women’s Rugby World Cup Organising Committee and also as England’s starting hooker at the World Cup. She missed the official opening ceremony as she had to take care of Griffin’s daughter, and then line up at hooker for England the following day.

Dorrington later captained England against Scotland at the 1994 World Cup. She did not get to play in the final when England beat defending champions the United States 38–23. She played her last test for England in 1997. She continued to play for Richmond and is the only player to represent Richmond for over three decades.

Dorrington was also Richmond’s first-ever female vice-president.

=== World Rugby Hall of Fame ===
Dorrington, Griffin, Cooper, and Forsyth were inducted into the World Rugby Hall of Fame in a special ceremony during the 2021 Rugby World Cup semi-finals at Eden Park on 5 November 2022.
