= Alice Cooper (rugby union) =

- Full name: Alice D. Cooper
- Born: Edinburgh, Scotland

Rugby union career
- Position: Forward
Senior career
| Years | Team | Apps | (Points) |
| | Richmond Women | | (0) |

Alice D. Cooper is a pioneer of women's rugby union, in England and internationally.

== Biography ==
Cooper was born in Edinburgh, Scotland. In October 1986, she met two members of the Richmond Women’s rugby team in a night out and was told that they needed tall players like her. She found an old pair of lacrosse boots and attended her first training at Richmond where she met Deborah Griffin, Sue Dorrington and Mary Forsyth.

Cooper became part of the Organising Committee for the inaugural Women’s Rugby World Cup in 1991. She was an obvious choice for Press officer because she was a regular contributor to Rugby World & Post where she had her own column about the women’s game. Cooper devoted countless hours creating media coverage for the tournament, and was often found at the National Sports Centre for Wales typing up team sheets and match reports, organising the printing of programmes, and handling media calls.

Cooper's playing career came to an end in 1993 after she suffered a broken leg while captaining the Richmond sevens team.

=== World Rugby Hall of Fame ===
Cooper, Dorrington, Griffin, and Forsyth will be inducted into the World Rugby Hall of Fame in a special ceremony during the 2021 Rugby World Cup semi-finals at Eden Park on 5 November 2022.
