= Fen Paw =

Welsh rugby union player and engineer

- Born: Gee Fen Paw c. 1966 China

Rugby union career
- Position: Wing
Amateur team(s)
Years	Team	Apps	(Points)
–	Swansea University		
–	Swansea Uplands		
International career
Years	Team	Apps	(Points)
1987	Wales		

Fen Paw (born c. 1966) is a Chinese-born engineer and former Welsh international rugby union player and county badminton player. She represented Wales in their first women's international rugby union match against England in 1987.

== Early life and education ==
Paw was born in China and moved to the United Kingdom in the mid-1980s to study at Swansea University. By 1987 she had been resident in the country for approximately two years.

She later completed a PhD at the University of Wales Swansea in 1996, with research focused on finite element analysis and parallel processing methods.

== Rugby union career ==
Paw played rugby union for Swansea University by 1986, appearing in inter-university competition and scoring tries in matches including a fixture against Warwick.

In 1987 she was selected as a wing for Wales in their first women's international match against England at Pontypool Park.

She later played for Swansea Uplands, where she was a regular try-scorer. In 1992 she scored tries in matches against Aberystwyth University and contributed to the club's success in the Welsh women's 15-a-side Plate competition, including scoring twice in a 44–0 victory during the tournament.

== Badminton career ==
Paw also competed at county level in badminton for West Glamorgan.

She made her county debut in 1986, being described as playing her first county match during that season. By December 1986 she was already recording victories in both singles and doubles, including winning both women's doubles matches with partner Ceri Evans.

She continued to compete regularly for the county side, winning matches in singles and doubles competitions in 1987. By 1991 she was an established member of the West Glamorgan senior team, winning doubles matches in county competition.

In 1996 she returned from injury to record a straight-games singles victory in county competition. She remained active at senior county level into the late 1990s, including dominant singles performances in 1999.

== Engineering and academic career ==
Paw's academic and professional work has been in computational mechanics and geomechanics, particularly in finite element analysis.

She was associated with the Swansea computational engineering group and later worked as a project engineer at Rockfield Software, a consultancy specialising in numerical modelling and geomechanics.

Her work is connected with research networks involving Swansea University, Cardiff University, the China University of Mining and Technology, and the University of California, Berkeley.
