= Mary Forsyth =

- University: Penn State University

Rugby union career
Senior career
Years	Team	Apps	(Points)
	Richmond Women		(0)
International career
Years	Team	Apps	(Points)
1988	England	1	(0)

Mary Forsyth is a pioneer of women's rugby union, in England and internationally.

== Biography ==
Forsyth was born in Pittsburgh, US. She was a high school athletics prospect when she enrolled at Penn State University in 1977. She had to set aside her athletics aspirations as she had to work to pay for her tuition. She soon discovered that her college had a women's rugby team so she switched from athletics to rugby. She represented Penn State for four years and continued her rugby career when she returned to Pittsburgh.

In 1985, Forsyth moved to London for work and lived only yards away from England's first women's rugby club in Finchley. She joined the Richmond Rugby Club where she met Deborah Griffin, Alice Cooper, and Sue Dorrington. In 1988, She made her sole international appearance for England against Sweden.

Forsyth was part of the organising committee for the inaugural women's Rugby World Cup in 1991 and was its financial controller. Most of the committee meetings were held in a boardroom in central London where Forsyth worked then. Seven days before the tournament began, she gave birth to her first child. Although she missed most of the World Cup, she still managed to fulfill her role, and made it to the final with her newborn baby, husband and mother.

=== World Rugby Hall of Fame ===
Forsyth, Cooper, Dorrington, and Griffin will be inducted into the World Rugby Hall of Fame in a special ceremony during the 2021 Rugby World Cup semi-finals at Eden Park on November 5, 2022.
