= David A. Cooke =

England international rugby union player

David Cooke
- Born: David Alexander Cooke; 10 February 1949 (age 77)
- University: Loughborough University

Rugby union career
- Position: Centre
Senior career
| Years | Team | Apps | (Points) |
- Loughborough Students RUFC
| – | Harlequins | | |
| – | Northampton | | |
| – | Bletchley | | |
International career
| Years | Team | Apps | (Points) |
| 1976 | England | 4 | (0) |

David Cooke is a former a rugby union international who represented England in 1976.

== Early life ==
David Cooke was born on 10 February 1949 and attended Gravesend Grammar School.

== Rugby union career ==
Cooke was selected to tour with England to Argentina following the 1972–73 season. The tour however was cancelled when threats were made that the players would not be safe. A tour to New Zealand was hastily arranged to replace the Argentinian trip but unfortunately for Cooke it was to take place later in the year by which time he had to withdraw from the squad owing to injury.

He eventually made his international debut on 17 January 1976 at Twickenham in the England vs Wales match. Of the 4 matches he played for his national side he was never on the winning side. He played his final match for England on 20 March 1976 at Parc des Princes in the France vs England match.

The bulk of his club career was with Harlequins whom he skippered to Middlesex Sevens success in 1978. He ended his first class career with Northampton before stepping down a level to play for Bletchley whom he helped reach their first Buckinghamshire Cup Final in 1981–82.
