= Hazelwick School =

Hazelwick School Academy

Location
- Hazelwick Mill Lane; Crawley, West Sussex, RH10 1SX; England; 51.1252°N 0.1652°W

Information
- Type: Secondary academy
- Motto: Effort Achieves.
- Established: 1952
- Local authority: West Sussex County Council
- Specialists: Technology, humanities and IT
- Department for Education URN: 137263 Tables
- Ofsted: Reports
- Chair of Governors: Rachel Bowron
- Head teacher: D Leadbitter
- Gender: Mixed
- Age: 11 to 18
- Enrolment: 2000+
- Colour: Royal Blue
- Website: http://www.hazelwick.org

Hazelwick School is a co-educational comprehensive school with academy status for pupils aged 11 to 18, located in Crawley, West Sussex, England. Its alumni include former footballer and England manager Gareth Southgate and comedian Romesh Ranganathan.

== History ==
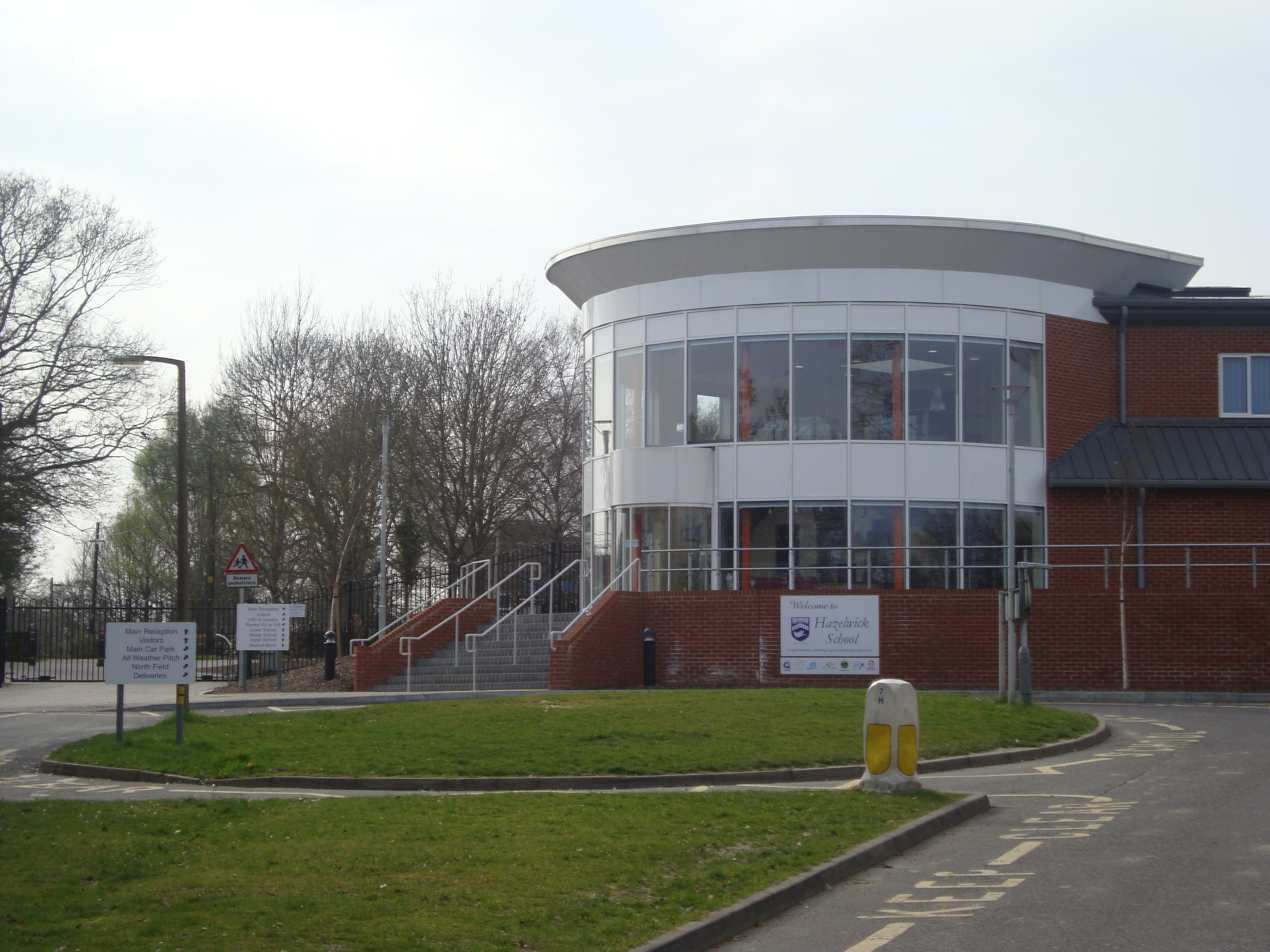
Hazelwick School entrance

Hazelwick School was built in 1953 as part of developing Crawley as a new town and was opened as Hazelwick county secondary modern school in 1953. A further building was added in 1959, and in 1960 became a bilateral modern and grammar school, becoming a comprehensive school in 1964.

In 1971, the school reduced its age range to 12–18, as the area became a three-tier area, with provision for children in middle schools up until the age of twelve, and in 1984 the number of students attending was 1,675. In 2004, with the school once again took pupils aged eleven, at the beginning of year 7. In preparation for this latter change, the school had considerable work done to buildings. It had been thought that the school would form part of the local private finance initiative which re-built other local schools, but this was not to be the case. A full-sized, floodlit, astroturf pitch was added in 2006. A new Learning Resource Centre, library, and specialist IT educational facility were added in 2007.

== Academy status ==
At the start of August 2011, Hazelwick School became an academy in line with new laws passed by the government. Academy status was sought due to the school governing body and parental community wanting to have independent control over the school, believing that in the long run the school itself (and the governing body) is best placed to make decisions about its future development.

== Students ==
The school caters for around 2000 pupils who are separated into 7 different years within the school. Years 7 to 8 study at Key Stage 3. Years 9 to 11 study at Key Stage 4 and obtain a variety of qualifications such as; GCSEs, BTECs, NVQs with most pupils choosing to continue on to A Levels. At Hazelwick's sixth form, approximately 400 students are taught at Key Stage 5 which provides several qualifications for students to obtain, with the main being A Levels. A range of other higher level awards such as BTEC and NVQ are also offered by the school.

== Curriculum ==
The school offers core subjects such as Maths, Science and English, and optional subjects such as Drama, Electronics, Art, Music and Computer Science. At GCSE level students are made to pick 4 optional subjects (along with Maths, Science and English).

== Notable former pupils ==
See also: People educated at Hazelwick School

- Erin Doherty, actress, Jessie March in Call the Midwife (2017), Fabienne in Les Misérables (2018), Princess Anne in The Crown (2019).
- Brad Hall (1990-), British bobsledder.
- Kathy Jenn (later Kathy Garson), England international rugby union player and member of the 1994 Women’s Rugby World Cup–winning squad
- Philip Lawson, singer, composer, arranger, baritone with The King's Singers (1994–2012)
- Abdul Waheed Majeed, the first British suicide bomber in the Syrian civil war
- Alex Mayer, Member of Parliament for Dunstable and Leighton Buzzard (2024-) and former Member of the European Parliament (2016–2019)
- Alan Minter, boxer
- Laura Moffatt, former Member of Parliament for Crawley (1997–2010)
- Romesh Ranganathan, comedian (later worked at the school as a maths teacher - see notable former teachers)
- Grace Saif, actress known for Doctors and the Netflix show 13 Reasons Why.
- Gareth Southgate, England manager (2016–2024), former England football player, and Middlesbrough manager/player.
- David Tong, professor of theoretical physics, University of Cambridge.
- Dan Walker, BBC breakfast presenter, former sports presenter, born and raised in Crawley.

== Notable former teachers ==
- Romesh Ranganathan, comedian (head of sixth form and maths teacher).
