= John Cleveland =

English poet and Royalist (1613–1658)

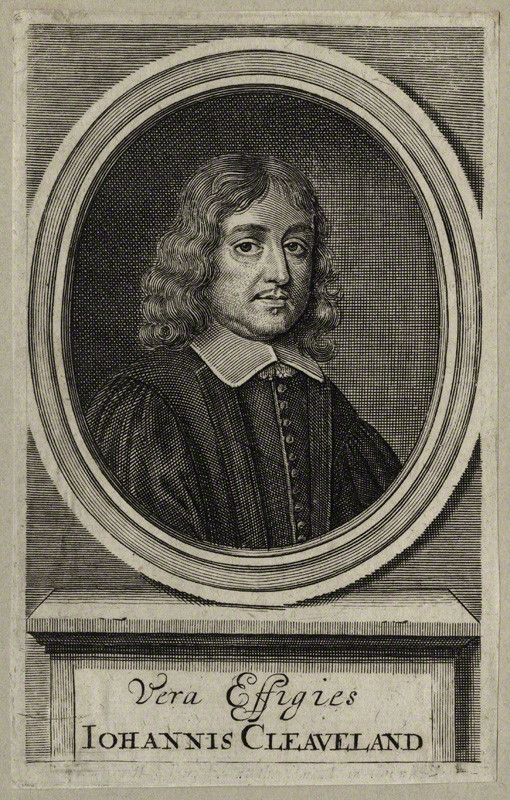
John Cleveland

John Cleveland (16 June 1613 – 29 April 1658) was an English poet who supported the Royalist cause in the English Civil War. He was best known for political satire.

== Early life ==
Cleveland was born in Loughborough, the son of Thomas Cleveland, Vicar of Hinckley (1620–1652), and educated at Hinckley Grammar School. Admitted to Christ's College, Cambridge, he graduated BA in 1632 and became a fellow of St John's College in 1634, where he became a college tutor and lecturer in rhetoric.

== Posts ==
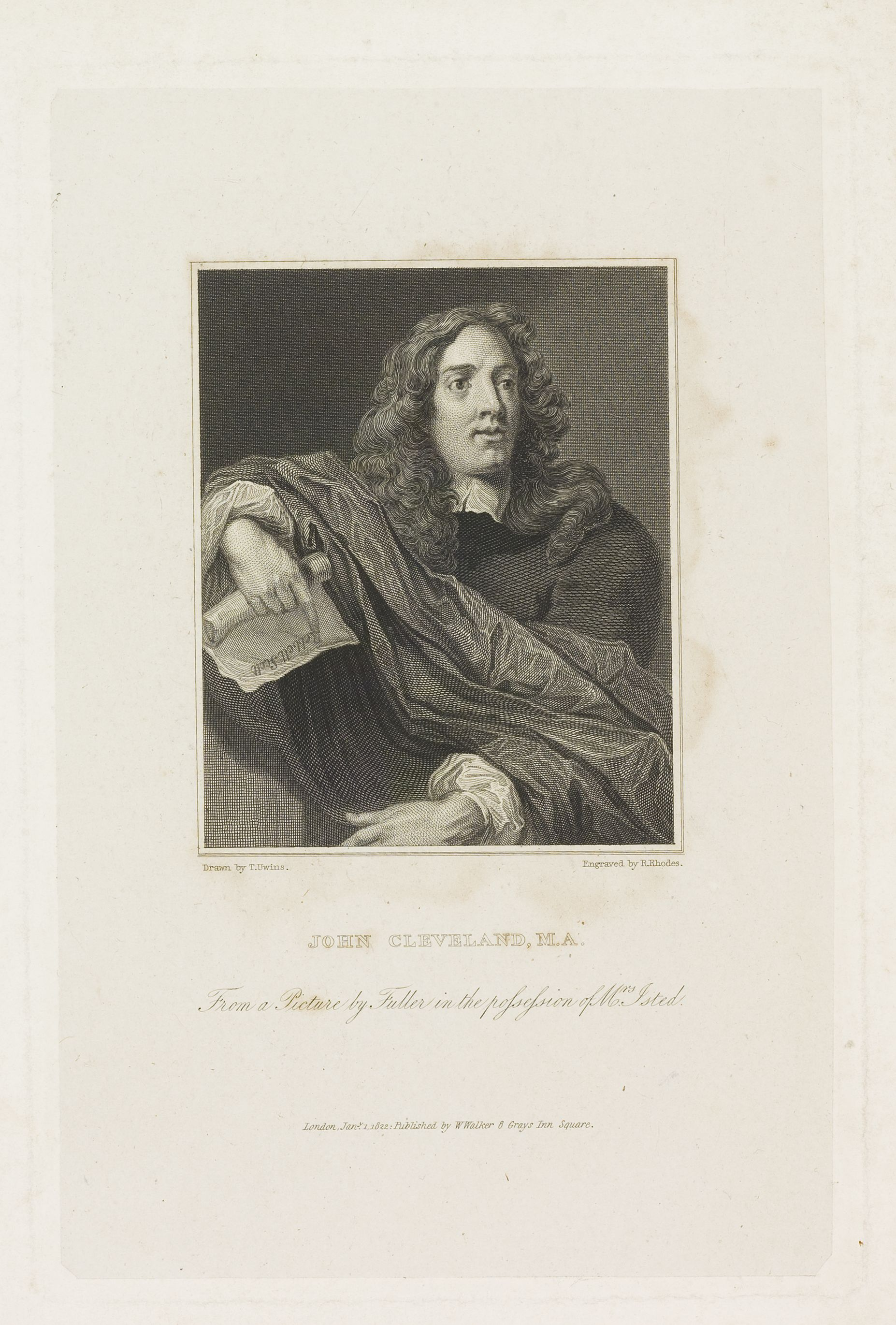
John Cleveland (by Thomas Uwins)

A staunch Royalist, Cleveland opposed the election of Oliver Cromwell as member for Cambridge in the Long Parliament and lost his college post as a result in 1645. He then joined Charles I, by whom he was welcomed, and appointed to the office of judge advocate at Newark-on-Trent.

In 1646, however, he lost his judge advocacy and wandered about the country dependent on the bounty of other Royalists. In 1655 he was imprisoned at Great Yarmouth, but released by Cromwell, to whom he appealed, and went to London, where he spent the rest of his life. For his letter to Cromwell, see May it please yr Highnesse (1657) or Cleaveland's petition to His Highnesse the Lord Protector [sic].

== Poems and other works ==
Cleveland's poems first appeared in The Character of a London Diurnal (1647) and thereafter in some 20 other collections. His achievement lay in political, satirical verses written mainly in heroic couplets. He has been called "both a detached, intellectual, 'metaphysical' poet" and "a committed satirist".

Cleveland also wrote Royalist news books such as Mercurius Pragmaticus for King Charles II, which appeared after the execution of Charles I. He was particularly interested in the 14th-century Wat Tyler rebellion against Richard II.

His own volume of Poems was published in 1654.
