= Kathy Jenn =

England rugby union player

- Born: Katherine Emma Jenn; December 1971 (age 54) Horsham, West Sussex, England
- School: Hazelwick School

Rugby union career
- Position: Flanker
Amateur team(s)
Years	Team	Apps	(Points)
–	Crawley WRFC		
–	Richmond Women		
International career
Years	Team	Apps	(Points)
1990s	England	3	
Medal record
Women's rugby union
Representing England
Rugby World Cup
Gold medal – first place	1994 England	Team competition

Kathy Jenn (born Katherine Emma Jenn; December 1971; later known as Kathy Garson) is an English former rugby union player who represented England as a flanker during the 1990s, including as part of the squad that won the 1994 Women's Rugby World Cup. She played club rugby for Crawley and Richmond Women, and has worked in housing and homelessness services for Crawley Borough Council.

== Early life and family ==
Jenn was born in Horsham, West Sussex, and was raised in Crawley in a family closely associated with rugby union. Her father, David Jenn, served as chairman of Crawley Rugby Club, while her mother, Jill Jenn (née Marshall), played rugby and was later described as a founding figure in the development of the club’s women’s team. All four Jenn children were involved in rugby. Her sisters Sarah and Joanne both played for Crawley, while her brother Andrew played at youth level. Contemporary local coverage highlighted the Jenn family as an unusual example of multiple women players emerging from the same household.

Jenn attended Hazelwick School and began playing rugby at the age of 16.

== Rugby career ==
Jenn began playing for Crawley Women’s Rugby Club as a teenager, appearing in local match reports by 1989. By 1990 she was an established member of the side, playing primarily as a flanker and scoring tries from the back row. Her performances led to selection for regional representative rugby, including training squads for the London and South East team.

Jenn progressed into the England set-up in the early 1990s and represented England in a four-team international tournament in Toronto in 1993, where the side finished as winners. By 1994 she had established herself in the senior England team as a flanker, winning three caps and being described as an England regular.

She was part of the England squad during the 1994 season, when the team won the Women’s World Championship in Edinburgh, later recognised as the 1994 Women's Rugby World Cup. She played in matches against Russia, Scotland and Canada.

In addition to her international career, Jenn was selected for invitational representative rugby, including appearances for the Nomads XV.

By the mid-1990s Jenn was playing for Richmond Women, one of the leading clubs in England having moved from Crawley. She played in major domestic fixtures, including Richmond’s run to the National Cup in 1996, where she contributed both defensively and in attack, including scoring in a cup quarter-final. In 1997 she appeared for Richmond against Crawley, facing her sister Sarah in a competitive fixture.

== Playing style ==
Jenn was primarily a flanker, although early in her career she also appeared in the backs. Contemporary reports described her as a committed and physical player, noted for her tackling, work rate and effectiveness both in defence and support play.

== Media and public profile ==
Jenn was featured in a Daily Express profile following England’s 1994 world title and in 1996 she appeared on ITV’s On Your Marks, hosted by Kriss Akabusi, promoting rugby in the south of England.

== Professional and personal life ==
Alongside her rugby career, Jenn worked for Crawley Borough Council in housing and homelessness services.

Following her marriage in 2001, she has been known as Kathy Garson. She and her husband have four children. In later years she has remained associated with rugby at community level and has appeared at club events as a former England international.
