= Charlie Bronks =

England rugby union player

- Born: Charlotte Louise Bronks; 1970 (age 55–56) Ealing, London, England

Rugby union career
- Position: Prop
Amateur team(s)
Years	Team	Apps	(Points)
1980s–early 1990s	Teddington Antlers		
early 1990s	Richmond Women		
International career
Years	Team	Apps	(Points)
1994	England		
Medal record
Women's rugby union
Representing England
Rugby World Cup
Gold medal – first place	1994 England	Team competition

Charlie Bronks (born Charlotte Louise Bronks in 1970) is an English former rugby union player who represented the England national team at the 1994 Women's Rugby World Cup. Playing in the front row as a prop, she was part of the England team that won the tournament.

== Early life ==
Bronks was born in [Greenford], in west London, and grew up in the area, where her family were based in Teddington. She is the daughter of Ronald Bronks and Mary (née Davies), and has three brothers.

== Rugby career ==
Bronks began playing for Teddington Antlers in the late 1980s and was selected for the South East regional side in 1989. She also played for Richmond Women.

A prop, she represented England as a member of the squad that won the 1994 Women's Rugby World Cup in Scotland.

== Other sporting career ==
Bronks also competed in rowing at junior level demonstrating her early involvement in high-level sport.

== Professional career ==
Bronks is Group Head of Responsible Business at Crown Agents Bank, part of CAB Payments, with responsibility for its responsible business and sustainability strategy.

Her earlier career included roles with Atos Consulting and Crown Agents Limited, and as Director of The Duke of Edinburgh's International Award World Fellowship.

At Crown Agents Bank, she established its marketing and communications function and subsequently established and led its sustainability function. She also led the bank's B Corp certification programme.

Bronks serves as a board trustee of the UN Global Compact Network UK and an advisory board member of ESGmark. She holds an MA in Global Diplomacy from SOAS University of London.
