= The Hinckley School =

Location
- Butt Lane; Hinckley, Leicestershire, LE10 1LE; England; 52.5469°N 1.3523°W

Information
- Type: Academy
- Motto: Building Brighter Futures
- Trust: The Futures Trust
- Department for Education URN: 148417 Tables
- Ofsted: Reports
- Gender: Coeducational
- Age: 11 to 18
- Website: www.thehinckleyschool.co.uk

The Hinckley School (formerly John Cleveland College) is a coeducational secondary school located in Hinckley, Leicestershire, England. The school also includes the John Cleveland Sixth Form Centre.

== History ==
Hinckley Grammar School was first mentioned in the parish records of 1629, though it was certainly in existence before this time. It was on Castle Road at the centre of Hinckley. However, in 1791 it was noted by the Universal British Directory that "The old town hall and school house remain, but are ruinous". In 1831 it was noted by the same organisation as "In a very dilapidated state", and the old grammar school was pulled down 21 years later in 1852, eventually being replaced by houses and shops. In 1877 a new school was opened, which in 1891 had 50 pupils. In 1894 moved to new purpose-built premises on Leicester Road, close to the current site. In 1901 the school admitted girls. In 1963 the grammar school moved to Butt Lane and the Leicester Road buildings were taken over by Mount Grace High School.

The school attained specialist Science College status before converting to academy status in 2012. Previously an upper school for pupils aged 14 to 18, it expanded in September 2015 to admit pupils from age 11 and was renamed from John Cleveland College to Hinckley Academy.

At the same time, Mount Grace High School closed, with its pupils and staff joining those of John Cleveland College to form the Hinckley Academy and John Cleveland Sixth Form College.

In 2020, the school became part of The Futures Trust, after which it was renamed The Hinckley School.

== Facilities ==
The school campus includes a main hall, a swimming pool, a large canteen, a lecture theatre, a sports hall, a gym, astro turf pitches, a hospitality block, a media room, tennis courts, football pitches, rugby pitches, land athletics pitches and tracks, store rooms and a library (the Learning Resource Centre). During May–September 2010, phase 1 of the sports centre refurbishment took place; this consisted of changing facilities. During December 2010 work started on phase 2 to add upper changing facilities and swimming pool. The new facilities opened March 2011. During August 2011 the design technology foyer and washrooms received a complete re-design and refurbishment.

== Awards ==
Awards include Investors in People, Artsmark Gold, International Schools Award and Healthy Schools Award status.

== Sport ==
The school runs football, rugby, basketball, hockey and kabbadi teams.

== Notable former pupils and teachers ==
=== John Cleveland College ===
- Leicester Tigers and England rugby union footballers: Barry Evans; Graham Rowntree; Dean Richards; Ollie Smith; Sam Vesty; Manu Tuilagi; Sam Harrison
- Kiernan Dewsbury-Hall, former Leicester City footballer.
- David Eaton, British gymnast
- Josh Ginnelly
- Val Moore – Wasps Ladies player, Great Britain international and England women's team manager (1994 World Cup winner)

=== Hinckley Grammar School (pre-1974) ===
- Roger Clark MBE, rally driver
- John Cleveland, poet
- Rex Malcolm Chaplin Dawson, biochemist
- Dill Faulkes, businessman and philanthropist
- John F. Smith, musician
- Terry St Clair, musician
- Peter Tom CBE, Chief Executive from 1997 to 2005 of Aggregate Industries, and former rugby union player
- Philip Turner, author
