= John Pallant =

England international rugby union player

- Full name: John Noel Pallant
- Born: 24 December 1944 (age 81) Nottingham, England
- School: High Pavement Grammar School
- University: Loughborough College
- Occupation: School teacher

Rugby union career
- Position: No. 8
International career
Years	Team	Apps	(Points)
1967	England	3	(0)

John Noel Pallant (born 24 December 1944) is an English former international rugby union player.

Pallant, a native of Nottingham, was educated at High Pavement Grammar School and won an All England schoolboy hammer-throwing title in 1961, setting a competition record with his throw of 159 ft 3 1/2 in (48.552 m).

A number eight, Pallant played his rugby for Nottingham and Loughborough Students. He gained three England caps in the 1967 Five Nations Championship, debuting against Ireland at Lansdowne Road.

Pallant was Director of Sport at Merchant Taylors' School, Northwood.

== See also ==
- List of England national rugby union players
