= Ollie Smith (rugby union, born 1982) =

British Lions & England international rugby union player

- Born: Ollie Smith; 14 August 1982 (age 44) Leicester, England
- Height: 1.83 m (6 ft 0 in)
- Weight: 90 kg (14 st 2 lb; 198 lb)
- School: John Cleveland College
- University: Loughborough University

Rugby union career
- Position: Centre
Amateur team(s)
Years	Team	Apps	(Points)
–	Loughborough Students		
–	Old Bosworthians		
–	Market Bosworth		
Senior career
Years	Team	Apps	(Points)
2000–2008	Leicester Tigers	174	(185)
2008–2010	Montpellier		
2010–2012	Harlequins		
International career
Years	Team	Apps	(Points)
2000–2001	England U19		
2001–2002	England U21		
2003–2005	England	5	(0)
2005	British & Irish Lions	1	(5)

Oliver James Smith (born 14 August 1982) is a former English rugby union international and domestic head coach, having had a spell with Esher RFC. During his playing career, he played for Harlequin F.C. Rugby Club, Montpellier Hérault Rugby, Leicester Tigers, England and the British & Irish Lions before a knee injury forced him to retire. He was a specialist outside centre but also occasionally played inside centre or wing.

== Early career ==
Born 14 August 1982 in Leicester, Smith was educated at John Cleveland College, Hinckley and went on to do a PE & Sports Science degree at Loughborough University. He started playing junior rugby union with Old Bosworthians and then joined Market Bosworth at U14 level. As a boy he attended Tigers matches with his father and had his first season ticket at Welford Road at age seven. He joined Leicester Academy in 1999 after attending a trial. He was an unused replacement aged 17 before making his Leicester debut in September 2000 against London Irish after his 18th birthday, at the time he was the youngest player to feature in the Zurich Premiership. His age and ability led to comparisons with former Tigers' centre Paul Dodge who did make his debut aged 17 and was to be his mentor. Smith started the victorious 2002 Heineken Cup Final for Leicester.

== International career ==
He played for England U18 'A' in 1999/00 and the next season became a member of the England U19 team, progressing to the U21 side during 2001/02. Smith then gained his first senior cap as a replacement against Italy in the 2003 Six Nations Championship. England went on to win the Grand Slam. However, shortly after his international debut he picked up a shoulder injury which ruled him out for the rest of that season. His next competitive game was the pre World Cup warm up match versus Wales, and then started his first game for England against France shortly afterwards. Due to lack of game time Smith was to miss out on inclusion in the 2003 Rugby World Cup.

With injuries to other centres Mike Tindall and Will Greenwood, Smith was tipped by amongst others former centre Jeremy Guscott to take his place in the 2005 Six Nations side. However, Smith was overlooked in favour of Newcastle centres Mathew Tait and Jamie Noon. Tait, aged only 18, played poorly in his debut against Wales and was substituted by Olly Barkley who played in the remaining matches. Noon was solid, if unspectacular and retained his place. Some good performances from Smith in club games saw him come onto the bench for the games against Ireland, Italy and Scotland, gaining two more caps against Italy and Scotland.

Smith was then named to the British & Irish Lions squad for the tour of New Zealand ahead of Noon and Barkley. Shortly after this announcement, his father died. He played in the warm-up test against Argentina scoring a try. This game was later granted test status by the IRB. In 2008 there was a great disappointment for Smith because he did not get into the England squad for the mid-year tour to New Zealand.

== 2006 onwards ==
Following a disappointing 2005/6 season, Smith went to Brisbane, Australia to train with the Brisbane Broncos rugby league team, apparently in an effort to rediscover his form. Smith then regained a regular starting position in the Leicester team with many tries to his name in the 2006/07 season. That year Leicester won the Premiership, with Smith starting the final as Leicester defeated Gloucester.

Smith openly admitted to having talks with other clubs over a move for this season. He signed for Montpellier after playing over 180 games for the Tigers.

In March 2010, Harlequins announced that they had signed Smith from the start of the 2010/11 season. Smith said after returning to England from a stint with French club Montpellier: "I am really looking forward to coming back to England and joining such a prestigious club, and one which has so much history. It boasts an exciting and young group of English players, some of whom I have been lucky enough to have played with during my time in the Saxons and the Churchill Cup. Quins is a team which is going in the right direction and I want to be a part of it.

"I will be joining Quins a year before the World Cup, and I am not afraid to say that one of the reasons I have returned to England is so I can push for a position in next year’s World Cup squad, and I believe Quins, with the players and coaching structure that they have in place, will allow me to achieve that aspiration". The news comes very soon after Quins had announced that David Strettle, one of Quins' best wingers would be leaving to Saracens.

== Injury, Retirement and Transition to Coaching ==
After just 11 games for Harlequins, Smith severely injured his knee during a clash against Saracens F.C. at Vicarage Road. It proved to be an injury he was unable to recover from, and he spent much of the 2011/2012 season in the position of Backs Coach for Esher RFC, who played in the RFU Championship at the time. Following their relegation, a coaching reshuffle took place and Smith was announced as Head Coach for the 2012/2013 season. However, after just one season in charge, Smith decided to stand down as head coach.
