= Swansea Uplands RFC =

Welsh rugby union club, based in Upper Killay

(Wales) Swansea Uplands RFC
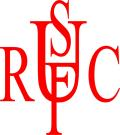
- Full name: Swansea Uplands Rugby Football Club
- Founded: 1919; 107 years ago
- Location: Upper Killay, Wales
- Ground: Fairwood Lane (Capacity: Approx 500)
- League: WRU Division One West
- 2025-26: 3rd
Team kit

Official website
- swanseauplandsrfc.mywru.co.uk

Swansea Uplands RFC is a rugby union club based in Upper Killay, Swansea, Wales, who play in the WRU Swalec Leagues. They are currently in Division 1 West.

Swansea Uplands RFC was founded at the Uplands Hotel, Swansea in 1919 by players of the pre World War I Swansea Grammar School team on their return to Swansea. This is how they came to name the club "Swansea Uplands RFC".

== Early history ==
The first tour was undertaken in 1921 to London with victories over London Wasps and Streatham and the following season, Parkhurst and Saracens. Tours continued in future years against opposition such as Upper Clapton and Hereford.

In 1922–23, the club found itself with sufficient players to establish an “A” (2nd) XV. The same season, after having played matches at Singleton Park, the recreation ground and St. Helens, the club obtained the lease on a pitch near The Bible College, Derwen Fawr, where they continued to play until the outbreak of World War II, although some matches were still played at St. Helens. In 1928, proposed by Pontardawe RFC and seconded by Pontarddulais RFC, the club applied for membership of the Welsh Rugby Union and at a meeting of the W.R.U. on 13 September 1928 this was granted.

The club played its final pre war fixture on tour against Old Whitgiftians in Croydon on 10 April 1939 and following a meeting held on 18 April 1939, the club enlisted en-bloc forming a “sportsman’s platoon” in 5th Battalion The Welch Regiment.

== Post 1945 ==
The club was reformed following World War II at a meeting held at St. Helens Cricket Pavilion, Swansea on Monday 10 May 1948 and the initial 1st XV fixture was played at Mumbles on 23 September with the “A” XV playing the same opponents two days later. After resuming playing at Derwen Fawr, the club sought its own ground and in 1952 purchased the field at Upper Killay. On 24 April 1956, the club played and defeated an International XV selected by Clem Thomas at St. Helens and raised the then considerable sum of £400 for charity. The clubhouse was built by the members and following a special match on 23 April 1958 to mark the occasion, the clubhouse was formally opened by Mr. Enoch H. Rees, President of the Welsh Rugby Union.

The “B” (or third) XV, first played on 15 November 1958. The clubhouse was extended to create the long bar and additional changing rooms and a celebration match was played against a Public Schools XV on 30 April 1962. The following September, a fourth XV, the Surfs was established. The extra ground needed for the creation of a second pitch was purchased in early 1963 and for the 1963–64 season, the “B” XV was renamed “The Unicorns”. In 1969 the club marked its 50th anniversary with a match on 28 April between a club XV and an International XV and a celebration dinner with Brigadier Glyn Hughes, the president of The Barbarians as chief guest.

In 1970, the club took the decision to play league rugby and was accepted into the West Wales Rugby Union. The first competitive match was in the West Wales Cup with a 3–0 victory at Penygroes on 13 February 1971 and the first league match was played the following season on 18 September 1971 at Burry Port. The commitment to the league however spelt the end of the club's traditional fixture list, which had covered an area from Newport to Aberystwyth. That year, the club established its first junior teams, becoming a founder member of the Swansea and District Boys Rugby Union.

A captains board was unveiled in 1977 when a team of ex 1st XV captains played a team of ex 2nd and 3rd XV captains. The club needed more space and in 1982, a further extension was built increasing the bar and changing facilities and this was marked by a match on Sunday 26 September against a Llanelli XV led by Derek Quinnell, containing three British Lions in addition to numerous players with international honours. In January 1986, the club became the first club in west Wales with a women's XV when the St. Thomas Ladies XV began playing at Upper Killay and changed their name to Swansea Uplands.

The club broke new ground when in September 1990 it hosted a "Romanian under 21" XV, which was the first side to leave Romania after the revolution. This team was found to contain 9 full internationals with all members of the squad being at least A internationals. In 1993, the club installed new floodlights to light both pitches and these were movable to enable cricket to be played in the summer.

Although the club had previously run an occasional veterans XV, in 1992, it became the home of Swansea Veterans RFC, when former Swansea RFC captain Bryn Evans founded that club, basing it at Swansea Uplands. Swansea Veterans is composed of former players from clubs in the Swansea area.

A further enhancement of facilities took place in 1995, when new changing rooms, showers, first aid and weight training facilities were added with the whole club having a new roof. The most recent addition to the club came in 2003, when Swansea Gladiators, the special needs XV based themselves at the club.

During its history, the club has earned a deserved reputation for playing host to teams from countries as varied as Argentina, Australia, Canada, England, Finland, France, Ireland, Japan, the Netherlands, New Zealand, Romania, Scotland, South Africa, Sweden, Switzerland and the USA. The club has also toured many of these countries together with others such as Belgium, Luxembourg and Portugal.

The club also has a cricket XI who play midweek evening fixtures and organise a popular annual six a side tournament, using a newly laid artificial wicket. The club's facilities are also used in the summer by Sketty Church Cricket Club who play Saturday cricket in the central league as well as midweek cricket.

The club has recently been promoted from the WRU national leagues and will play in one of the division 4 leagues in the following season. Swansea Uplands is also home to a Junior Section with teams from under 8's upwards and is also the home of Swansea Veterans, youth and of the special needs team Swansea Gladiators.

== Post club redevelopment ==
In 2013 the club had a massive cash injection and £1,000,000 was invested on the club facilities and infrastructure. The club now brings in a high number of spectators and widely regarded as the most up and coming team in the Swalec Leagues.

Swansea Uplands now play in the newly restructured Swalec WRU Division 2 West A. They have come close to promotion a few times over the last two seasons, missing out by one place in the 2014–15 season.

They have had some notable wins in recent times, most notably a win against one of their local rivals Mumbles RFC in 2014–15, who were two leagues above at the time.

In recent years, they have a 1st XV, 2nd XV and Youth Team.

== Notable players ==
- Fen Paw – Wales international rugby union player. Played in Wales' first women's international match in 1987.
