= Robert MacEwen =

Scotland international rugby union player

- Born: Robert Kenneth Gillespie MacEwen; 25 February 1928 Oxford, England
- Died: 28 August 2013 (aged 85) Oxford, England
- School: Bristol Grammar School
- University: Loughborough University; St Catharine's College, Cambridge

Rugby union career
- Position: Hooker
Senior career
Years	Team	Apps	(Points)
- Loughborough Colleges
–	Cambridge University RUFC		
International career
Years	Team	Apps	(Points)
1954–1958	Scotland	13	(0)

Robert MacEwen (25 February 1928 – 28 August 2013) was a rugby union international who represented Scotland from 1954 to 1958.

== Early life ==
Robert MacEwen was born in Oxford.

== Rugby union career ==
MacEwen made his international debut on 9 January 1954 at Murrayfield in the Scotland vs France match. Of the 13 matches he played for his national side he was on the winning side on 3 occasions. He played his final match for Scotland on 1 February 1958 at Cardiff Arms Park in the Wales vs Scotland match.
