= Great Britain women's national rugby union team =

Great Britain
- Union: Women's Rugby Football Union
Team kit

First international
- Great Britain 8-14 France (London, England, 19 April 1986)

Largest win
- Great Britain 32-0 Italy (Birmingham, England, 18 March 1990)

Largest defeat
- France 28-6 Great Britain (Chalon-sur-Saône, France 2 May 1987)

The Great Britain women's national rugby union team was the national rugby union team of Great Britain, from 1986 to 1990.

== History ==
The team was organised by the Women's Rugby Football Union (WRFU), which governed women's rugby in the United Kingdom from 1983 to 1994. It emerged during a formative period for the women's game, when the sport remained largely amateur and was primarily centred on universities and a small number of clubs.

The Great Britain side was established as a representative team drawing players from England, Wales, and Scotland, reflecting the absence of fully developed national teams at that time.

Great Britain played its first international match against France on 19 April 1986 at the Richmond Athletic Ground in London, the first women's international rugby union match to be staged in Britain. France won 14–8, scoring three tries to Great Britain's two, both scored by Karen Almond. The match attracted a crowd of around 800 spectators and was regarded as an important milestone in establishing the viability and visibility of the women's international game.

The team continued to compete internationally between 1986 and 1990, before being gradually replaced by separate national sides representing England, Scotland and Wales. England and Wales played their first internationals in 1987, with Scotland and Ireland following in 1993.

== Results summary ==
(Full internationals only)

Rugby: Great Britain internationals 1986–1990
Opponent	First game	Played	Won	Drawn	Lost	Percentage
France	1986	4	1	0	3	25.00%
Italy	1988	2	2	0	0	100.00%
Netherlands	1987	2	2	0	0	100.00%
Summary		8	5	0	3	62.50%

== Results ==
=== Full internationals ===
Won	Lost	Draw

Test	Date	Opponent	PF	PA	Venue	Event
1	19 April 1986	France	8	14	Richmond	1986 Great Britain v France women's rugby union match
2	2 May 1987	France	6	28	Chalon-sur-Saône	
3	22 November 1987	Netherlands	16	0	Richmond	
4	21 May 1988	Italy	32	9	Bourg en Bresse	1988 Women's Rugby European Cup
5	22 May 1988	Netherlands	26	0	Bourg en Bresse	1988 Women's Rugby European Cup
6	23 May 1988	France	6	8	Bourg en Bresse	1988 Women's Rugby European Cup
7	4 March 1989	France	13	0	Rosslyn Park	Carlsberg Trophy
8	18 March 1990	Italy	32	0	Moseley	

== Players ==
Great Britain women's international rugby union players (1986–1990)
No.	Name	Position	GB Caps	Country of origin	Date of first cap	Opposition	Source(s)
1	Karen Almond		8	England	19 April 1986	vs. France at Richmond	
2	Sam Robson		8	England	19 April 1986	vs. France at Richmond	
3	Carol Isherwood		7	England	19 April 1986	vs. France at Richmond	
4	Jayne Watts		7	England	19 April 1986	vs. France at Richmond	
5	Liza Burgess		8	Wales	19 April 1986	vs. France at Richmond	
6	Amanda Bennett		2	Wales	19 April 1986	vs. France at Richmond	
7	Debbie Francis		8	Scotland / England	19 April 1986	vs. France at Richmond	
8	Val Moore		2	England	19 April 1986	vs. France at Richmond	
9	Pip Atkinson		2	England	19 April 1986	vs. France at Richmond	
10	Suzy Hill		≥1	England	19 April 1986	vs. France at Richmond	
11	Jo Talbot		≥1	Wales	19 April 1986	vs. France at Richmond	
12	Kathy Lee		≥1	-	19 April 1986	vs. France at Richmond	
13	Tessa Durkin		≥1		19 April 1986	vs. France at Richmond	
14	Tricia Moore		≥1		19 April 1986	vs. France at Richmond	
15	Janet Gedrych		≥1	Wales	19 April 1986	vs. France at Richmond	
16	Gill Burns		2	England	—	—	
17	Jane Mangham		1	England	—	—	
18	Emma Mitchell		5	England	—	—	
19	Janis Ross		5	England	—	—	
20	Cheryl Stennett		5	England	—	—	
21	Heather Stirrup		1	England	—	—	
22	Sue Wachholz-Dorrington		1	England	—	—	
23	Claire Williets		6	England	—	—	
24	Carol Thomas		≥1	Wales	—	—	
25	Pat Harris		≥1	England	—	—	
26	Alice Jenkinson		≥1	England	—	—	
27	Janet Pringle		1	England	—	—	
28	Jill Shapland			England	—	—	
29	Nikki Ponsford			England	—	—	
30	Sally Purdey				—	—	
31	Jane Mitchell			England	—	—	

Notes

- This list is not necessarily complete and is based on currently identified sources.
- The numbering system above is for convenience only and does not represent an official cap numbering sequence.

== See also ==
- Stefan Czerpak
