= Stefan Czerpak =

Personal information
- National team: Great Britain national women's rugby union team
- Citizenship: United Kingdom
- Born: 1951
- Died: 1998
- Occupation: Rugby union coach

Sport
- Sport: Rugby union
- Position: Coach
- Team: Newbury RFC, Reading RFC, Richmond RFC, Great Britain women's national rugby union team
- Updated on 2021-05-01

Stefan Czerpak (1951–1998) was a rugby union coach and physical education teacher. Czerpak was a lifelong member of Newbury RFC, having represented them throughout his playing career and coached them through their rise up the national leagues; he also coached Reading R.F.C. and Richmond F.C. Czerpak helped to mould mini rugby in West Berkshire. Following his success at Newbury RFC, he went on to coach the Great Britain national women's rugby union team, then onto assistant coach of the England Colts team, and finally, the position of coach to the England Colts team. By 1998 Czerpak was appointed England Colts coach and was to go on his first major overseas tour with them to Argentina in August 1998 (he had been on tour to Canada as an assistant coach in 1995.)

On July 28, 1998, a few weeks before he would have left for Argentina, he had a massive, fatal heart attack on his way home from a workout at the gym.

Czerpak coached many notable rugby union players, including Josh Lewsey, Joe Worsley, Trevor Woodman, Ben Kay, Phil Vickery, Phil Greening, Martin Wood, Ben Cohen, Lewis Moody, Tony Diprose, Mike Tindall and Andy Gomarsall - who made an appearance at the 2004 memorial match along with Ayoola Erinle. Tom Croft is probably the last player to be coached by Czerpak and make it to 'top-flight rugby.' Czerpak coached and taught Tom at Park House school.

Two annual memorial matches are played in Czerpak's memory. One at Newbury Rugby club and one at the Dubai 7's tournament. Both raise money and awareness for the British Heart Foundation. Kenny Logan and Bob Skinstad both played in Czerpak's memorial team - Czerpak BHF at Dubai 7's 2006 tournament.

In addition to these two events, there is also another Memorial match played annually in memory of Czerpak. The "Stefan Czerpak Memorial Trophy, Colts divisional championship" - England rugby Trials.
