= Richmond Women =

- Union: RFU
- Founded: 1986

Richmond Women, formally Finchley RFC, is a women's rugby union team based in Richmond, London, England. They were founded in 1986 and played in the Women's Premiership. They are also the women's team of Richmond F.C.

== History ==
Richmond Women were initially formed in 1986 as part of Finchley RFC. They were one of the first women's rugby union teams established in England. They later became a part of Richmond F.C., because of the financial support that Richmond were able to give and they took on the name of Richmond Women as a result. The club used the name "Women" instead of "Ladies" because of a belief that Ladies would imply that it was not a serious team. The team is one of the oldest and most successful in English women's rugby union with 25 league and cup victories, six National Sevens wins and four European Championship titles. In 2000, they won the Rugby World National Cup after beating Wasps Ladies in the final at Twickenham Stadium in the first women's rugby union match to be played there. between 2010 and 2012, they won three consecutive league titles. They run three teams, with Richmond II playing in Championship 1 South and Richmond Women III playing in Championship 2 South East.

In 1995, they had an honour's board erected in the clubhouse at the Athletic Ground however it was later removed by members of London Scottish, who share the Athletic Ground, claiming that Richmond didn't have permission to put one up.

== Notable players ==
Richmond women have had 118 international players play for them, including 18 in 2001.

- Charlie Bronks - England; member of the 1994 Women’s Rugby World Cup–winning squad
- Emma Croker – played for Richmond and England.
- Rebecca Essex – played for Richmond and England.
- Karen Findlay – coached Richmond and Scotland.
- Debbie Francis – England, Scotland; also represented a Great Britain XV and was a member of the 1991 Women's Rugby World Cup–runner-up squad
- Janet Gedrych – Great Britain and Wales and United Rugby Championship disciplinary panel member
- Kathy Jenn (later Kathy Garson) - England; member of the 1994 Women’s Rugby World Cup–winning squad
- Giselle Mather (née Prangnell) - 1990-1992 - English rugby union international and coach, won 34 caps for England, part of the 1994 Women's World Cup winning side, first woman to achieve level 4 coaching status from the RFU, first woman to coach a male rugby union side, first coach of the Women's Barbarians and from 2024 coach of the Great Britain women's national rugby sevens team squad.
- Amber Reed – played for Richmond and England.

=== World Rugby Hall of Fame inductees ===
- Mary Forsyth – inducted into the World Rugby Hall of Fame.
- Deborah Griffin – inducted into the World Rugby Hall of Fame.
- Alice Cooper – inducted into the World Rugby Hall of Fame.
- Sue Dorrington – inducted into the World Rugby Hall of Fame.
