= Clive Rees =

British Lions & Wales international rugby union player

- Born: Clive Frederick William Rees; 6 October 1951 (age 75) Singapore
- Height: 175 cm (5 ft 9 in)
- Weight: 74 kg (11 st 9 lb)
- School: Llanelli Grammar School
- University: Loughborough College
- Occupation: teacher

Rugby union career
- Position: Wing
Amateur team(s)
Years	Team	Apps	(Points)
- Loughborough Colleges
–	Llanelli Wanderers, Llanelli RFC		
–	London Welsh RFC		
–	Barbarian F.C.		
International career
Years	Team	Apps	(Points)
1974-1983	Wales	13	(0)
1974	British Lions	0	(0)

Clive Frederick William Rees (born 6 October 1951 in Singapore) is a Welsh former rugby union player. He won thirteen caps as left wing for Wales between 1973 and 1983.

Clive Rees's rugby career started at Llanelli Grammar School in the late 1960s where he instantly became known as 'Fred' and played on the wing at all levels. In the same Llanelli & District Schoolboys team were future internationals Gareth Jenkins and Stephen Warlow, and Scarlets Bernard Thomas and Roy Mathias. He displayed his natural speed by winning both the 100 and 200 meters at the Colwyn Bay Secondary Schools Athletic Championship.

Rees went on to study at Loughborough College, where he played in the rugby team for three seasons alongside future stars Fran Cotton and Steve Smith. During a freshers trial Rees came off the wing to score under the post which prompted coach Jim Greenwood to invite him to join the senior squad. Rees played opposite Lewis Dick (who went on to play for Scotland). At only eighteen he found himself in the College Sevens team, beating Cardiff in the final of the Glengarth Sevens. It was here that a boy said to Steve Smith that Clive Rees was running so fast his legs were a blur, just like Billy Whizz from The Beano - a nickname by which Rees is still fondly referred to.

During a holiday from Loughborough, Rees returned home to play for Llanelli RFC. He won his first cap for Wales in 1973, the year he started playing for Llanelli Wanderers prior to moving to London Welsh, and played in the Welsh side that beat Australia in 1975.

He was reselected to the Welsh squad in 1980.

In 1983 Rees scored his 100th try for London Welsh against London Scottish, drawing a standing ovation. Rees was made captain of London Welsh for the club's 1984-85 centenary season. He was determined to make a break with the past, ignore nostalgic media comparisons to the great John Dawes era, and shake the club into a determined drive for excellence. Under his enthusiastic captaincy the club was unbeaten at home for a record-breaking seven months, and for the first time in its history London Welsh reached the final of the John Player Cup. Rees himself is on record as having scored most tries in the Cup with eleven after J. P. R. Williams' six. To cap the centenary season London Welsh went on a world tour.

Together with the likes of Kevin Bowring and Robert Ackerman, Clive Rees was in the London Welsh team that won the Middlesex Sevens.

During his career Rees also played nine times for the Barbarians and journalists voted him player of the tournament in the Hong Kong Sevens. In 1974, he was selected as the youngest member of the British Lions squad for the tour of South Africa. The Lions were unbeaten on that tour, with 21 wins and one draw. Rees had to stop playing after 7 games because he broke his hand.

In 1987 Rees travelled to Japan to train the Toshiba team.

At the same time Clive Rees was a Teacher. After starting his teaching career at Highdown School, he was head of rugby at Chiltern Edge School, then went on to become head of PE at Haberdashers' Aske's Boys' School and later at Clifton College Prep School in Bristol.
