= Andy Vilk =

English rugby union player

- Born: Andrew Vilk; 11 June 1981 (age 45) Hammersmith, London, England
- Height: 5 ft 11 in (1.80 m)
- Weight: 15 st 5 lb (215 lb; 98 kg)
- School: The Oratory School
- University: Loughborough University

Rugby union career
- Position(s): Centre, Wing
- Current team: Calvisano
Senior career
Years	Team	Apps	(Points)
2000–2003	Loughborough		
2003–2006	Northampton	21	(5)
2006–2008	Sale Sharks	5	(5)
2008–2011	Treviso	52	(52)
2011–2012	Rugby Lions	21	(50)
2012–2014	Calvisano	35	(50)
National sevens team
Years	Team		Comps
2005–2012	England 7s		
Coaching career
- Years: Team
- 2014–: Italy 7s
Medal record
Men's rugby sevens
Representing England
Commonwealth Games
Silver medal – second place	2006 Melbourne	Team competition

Andrew Vilk (born 11 June 1981) is the responsabile tecnico ‘head coach’ of rugby 7s national side for Italy. A rugby union player who played at centre for Calvisano. He played in the forwards for England Sevens and captained the side in Hong Kong. He has played for Sale Sharks and Northampton Saints. He is a strong and powerful runner.

== Early life ==
Vilk was born in Hammersmith, London. His parents moved to Goring-On-Thames when he was very young. He was educated at The Oratory School, near Reading, where he played both rugby and soccer until he was 17. At 18 he spent a year in New Zealand aiding the Physical Education department at Tauranga Boys' College and mentoring children with learning difficulties, primarily helping develop reading skills. He returned to take a Geography degree at Loughborough University and came under the gaze of mentor Alan Buzza.

== Playing career ==
=== Professional ===
For the 2003/04 season, Vilk joined Northampton Saints Senior Academy from Loughborough University, when he was the leading try scorer in the Northern Conference of the Zurich A League. He also made his first team debut against Rotherham that season. In 2006 he transferred to Sale Sharks.

Vilk joined Benetton Treviso from Sale Sharks in 2008. With Benetton Treviso he won Italian Super 10 titles in both 2008/09 and 2009/10. Vilk scored the opening try of the 2008/09 final at Rome's Stadio Flaminio which Benetton went on to win 29–20. In the 2009/10 final Vilk scored the only try, securing the Man of the Match award in a game Benetton won 16–12.

Vilk played in 16 Heineken Cup matches in his three seasons with Benetton Treviso (starting 15 and coming off the bench in 1).

Vilk wrote a weekly column for Rugby Times magazine and Sportpost.com on life and rugby in Italy, and regularly contributed to Absolute Radio's Rock and Roll Sports podcast.

In July 2011, Vilk joined Rugby Lions on a free transfer, and was subsequently appointed captain. He led the Lions to the title in his first season, which they won with two games remaining winning every match in the process. In an interview with the Rugby Advertiser, Vilk said "This has been a fantastic squad who have come together so well and achieved fantastic results."

Due to the downturn in financial fortunes at the Lions, Vilk returned to Italy in July 2012, to join Calvisano. He was the team's second highest try scorer during the 2012/13 campaign and helped them reach the playoff semi-finals. He continues to play for them in the 2013/14 season.

=== England Sevens ===
In February 2005, Vilk made his England Sevens debut in Wellington and was a member of the winning side at the 2006 Hong Kong Sevens, he also won a Commonwealth medal (silver) at Melbourne. He has also been a member of winning sides at tournaments in Dubai, Los Angeles and Wellington in the IRB World Sevens Series. He has played 32 tournaments for England (26 consecutive): 30 IRB World Sevens Series Tournaments, 1 Commonwealth Games and the Rugby Sevens World Cup in Dubai 2009.

Vilk was the captain of the England Sevens team in the 2007–2008 world series, and beat New Zealand for the first time in four years in the London leg of the 7's series. The following week the England side reached the final of the Edinburgh leg of the 7's series.

Vilk's fine form for the Lions earned him a recall to the England Sevens set-up, as he was selected for the squad to prepare for the final two legs of the 2012 Sevens World Series. He was subsequently selected for the team for the Twickenham leg of the World Sevens Series.

== Coaching ==
In May 2013, Vilk took up position as Head Coach of the Italy national rugby sevens team. In his first season in charge he took the team to the final of the World Rugby Sevens Series Qualifier tournament at the 2013 Hong Kong Sevens where they lost to Japan.
