= World Rugby Hall of Fame =

Hall of Fame in rugby union

The World Rugby Hall of Fame (formerly the IRB Hall of Fame) recognises special achievement and contribution to the sport of rugby union. The World Rugby Hall of Fame covers players, coaches, administrators, match officials, institutions and other individuals. The Hall of Fame recognises the history and important contributions to the game, through one or more induction ceremonies that have been held annually except in 2010. The permanent physical home of the Hall of Fame was based at the Rugby Art Gallery, Museum & Library in Rugby, Warwickshire from 2016 until 2021.

== History ==
The Hall of Fame was introduced by the International Rugby Board (as World Rugby was then known) during the 2006 IRB Awards ceremony in Glasgow, Scotland. The inaugural inductees were William Webb Ellis, who apocryphally caught the ball during a football game and ran with it, and Rugby School, which has left a huge legacy with the game in a number of ways.

The second induction to the Hall of Fame took place in Paris on 21 October 2007, the night after the 2007 Rugby World Cup final. The next induction was in London on 23 November 2008.

The third induction, in which nine figures entered the Hall, was held on 27 October 2009 at Rugby School. The voting process for the class of 2009 was geared toward the history of British & Irish Lions tours to South Africa, the most recent of which took place in that year; all of the candidates were either Lions or Springboks.

For 2011, induction ceremonies were held at various locations around the world, with the year's final ceremony taking place as part of the 2011 IRB Awards on 24 October in Auckland, the day after the Rugby World Cup final in that city. The inductions at the Auckland ceremony, according to the IRB, were "under the theme of Rugby World Cup founders, visionaries and iconic figures," and were made in three groups—first for the founders of the RWC, then all World Cup-winning captains and coaches through the 2007 World Cup (minus John Eales, inducted in 2007), and finally other iconic players of the World Cup.

The pattern begun in 2011 was repeated in 2012, with six induction ceremonies being held in six countries. As in the two previous induction cycles, the 2012 inductions had an overriding theme; "Rugby – A Global Game". According to the IRB, it "celebrates Rugby's expansion to become a global sport played by millions of men and women worldwide."

On 31 July 2014, the IRB announced that its Hall would merge with the separate International Rugby Hall of Fame later in 2014. The merger saw the 37 members of the International Hall who had not already been honoured by the IRB formally enter the World Rugby Hall of Fame in 2014 and 2015. The 2014 class of inductees also included six women.

On 19 November 2014 the IRB rebranded as World Rugby, and the Hall of Fame became known as the World Rugby Hall Of Fame.

== Inductees ==
Year	No.	Nation	Inductee	Link
2006		England	William Webb Ellis	
2006		England	Rugby School	
2007		South Africa	Danie Craven	
2007		France	Pierre de Coubertin	
2007		Australia	John Eales	
2007		Wales	Gareth Edwards	
2007		New Zealand	Wilson Whineray	
2008		New Zealand	1888–89 New Zealand Native football team	
2008		Scotland	Ned Haig	
2008		Ireland	Jack Kyle	
2008		Scotland	Melrose Rugby Football Club	
2008		Argentina	Hugo Porta	
2008		France	Philippe Sella	
2008		New Zealand	Joseph Astbury Warbrick	
2009		South Africa and Argentina	Barry Heatlie	
2009		Scotland	Bill Maclagan	
2009		Ireland	Willie John McBride	
2009		Scotland	Ian McGeechan	
2009		Ireland	Syd Millar	
2009		Wales	Cliff Morgan	
2009		Ireland	Tony O'Reilly	
2009		South Africa	Bennie Osler	
2009		South Africa	Frik du Preez	
2011		United Kingdom	Barbarian Football Club	
2011		France	Serge Blanco	
2011		France	André Boniface	
2011		Wales	Cardiff Rugby Football Club	
2011		England	William Percy Carpmael	
2011		New Zealand	Dave Gallaher	
2011		Ireland	Mike Gibson	
2011		Wales	Frank Hancock	
2011		France	Lucien Mias	
2011		France	Jean Prat	
2011		England	Alan Rotherham	
2011		England	Harry Vassall	
2011		South Africa	Kitch Christie	
2011		Australia	Bob Dwyer	
2011		Australia	Nick Farr-Jones	
2011		England	Martin Johnson	
2011		England	John Kendall-Carpenter	
2011		New Zealand	David Kirk	
2011		Samoa	Brian Lima	
2011		New Zealand	Dick Littlejohn	
2011		New Zealand	Brian Lochore	
2011		New Zealand	Jonah Lomu	
2011		Australia	Rod Macqueen	
2011		South Africa	François Pienaar	
2011		Argentina	Agustín Pichot	
2011		Canada	Gareth Rees	
2011		Australia	Nicholas Shehadie	
2011		South Africa	John Smit	
2011		Australia	IR Vanderfield	
2011		South Africa	Jake White	
2011		England	Clive Woodward	
2012		United States	1920 and 1924 United States Olympic rugby team	
2012		Romania	1924 Romania Olympic rugby team	
2012		Chile	Donald Campbell	
2012		Chile	Ian Campbell	
2012		Japan	Yoshihiro Sakata	
2012		New Zealand	Gordon Tietjens	
2012		Zimbabwe	Kennedy Tsimba	
2012		Zimbabwe	Richard Tsimba	
2013		Scotland	David Bedell-Sivright	
2013		Australia	David Campese	
2013		Australia	Ken Catchpole	
2013		Ireland	Ronnie Dawson	
2013		Australia	Mark Ella	
2013		Australia	George Gregan	
2013		England	Alfred St. George Hamersley	
2013		Scotland	Gavin Hastings	
2013		Soviet Union	Vladimir Ilyushin	
2013		Australia	Thomas Lawton, Snr	
2013		Wales	Jack Matthews	
2013		United Kingdom	Robert Seddon	
2013		United Kingdom	1888 British Lions	
2013		Fiji	Waisale Serevi	
2013		Australia	John Thornett	
2013		Wales	Bleddyn Williams	
2014		New Zealand	Fred Allen	
2014		New Zealand	Don Clarke	
2014		New Zealand	Grant Fox	
2014		New Zealand	Sean Fitzpatrick	
2014		New Zealand	Michael Jones	
2014		New Zealand	Ian Kirkpatrick	
2014		New Zealand	John Kirwan	
2014		New Zealand	Terry McLean	
2014		New Zealand	Colin Meads	
2014		New Zealand	Graham Mourie	
2014		New Zealand	George Nēpia	
2014		France	Nathalie Amiel (Note: This inductee is a woman.)	
2014		England	Gillian Burns	
2014		United States	Patty Jervey	
2014		England	Carol Isherwood	
2014		New Zealand	Anna Richards	
2014		New Zealand	Farah Palmer	
2014		Wales	Keith Rowlands	
2014		Scotland	James Greenwood	
2014		Wales	J. P. R. Williams	
2014		Australia	Michael Lynagh	
2014		France	Jo Maso	
2014		Ireland	Keith Wood	
2014		Wales	Ieuan Evans	
2014		England	Jason Leonard	
2014		England	Jonny Wilkinson	
2014		England	Bill Beaumont	
2015		Australia	Tim Horan	
2015		Australia	Tom Richards	
2015		England	Edgar Mobbs	
2015		England	Ronald Poulton-Palmer	
2015		England	Wavell Wakefield	
2015		France	Jean-Pierre Rives	
2015		France	Marcel Communeau	
2015		Ireland	Basil Maclear	
2015		Ireland	Fergus Slattery	
2015		Ireland	Tom Kiernan	
2015		Scotland	Andy Irvine	
2015		Scotland	Bill McLaren	
2015		Scotland	Gordon Brown	
2015		South Africa	Danie Gerber	
2015		South Africa	Hennie Muller	
2015		South Africa	Joost van der Westhuizen	
2015		South Africa	Morne du Plessis	
2015		South Africa	Naas Botha	
2015		South Africa	Nelson Mandela	
2015		Wales	Barry John	
2015		Wales	Carwyn James	
2015		Wales	Gerald Davies	
2015		Wales	Gwyn Nicholls	
2015		Wales	Mervyn Davies	
2015		Wales	Phil Bennett	
2015		Wales	Johnny Williams	
2016		Australia and United States	Daniel Carroll	
2016		Canada	Heather Moyse	
2016		England	Margaret Alphonsi	
2016		England	Lawrence Dallaglio	
2016		England	Jeremy Guscott	
2016		Ireland	Brian O'Driscoll	
2016		Japan	Daisuke Ohata	
2016		Scotland	G.P.S. Macpherson	
2016		Wales	John Dawes	
2016		Wales	Arthur Gould	
2016		Wales	Shane Williams	
2017	133	Argentina	Felipe Contepomi	
2017	134	Canada	Al Charron	
2017	135	France	Fabien Pelous	
2017	136	England	Rob Andrew	
2017	137	United States	Phaidra Knight	
2018	138	Australia	Stephen Larkham	
2018	139	Ireland	Ronan O'Gara	
2018	140	France	Pierre Villepreux	
2018	141	New Zealand	Bryan Williams	
2018	142	Wales	Liza Burgess	
2019	143	New Zealand	Richie McCaw	
2019	144	Japan	Shiggy Konno	
2019	145	South Africa	Os du Randt	
2019	146	Samoa	Peter Fatialofa	
2019	147	New Zealand	Graham Henry	
2019	148	Uruguay	Diego Ormaechea	
2021	149	Fiji	Osea Kolinisau	
2021	150	Kenya	Humphrey Kayange	
2021	151	New Zealand	Huriana Manuel	
2021	152	Australia	Cheryl McAfee	
2021	153	England	Will Carling	
2021	154	Scotland	Jim Telfer	
2022	155	England	Deborah Griffin	
2022	156	England	Sue Dorrington	
2022	157	England	Alice Cooper	
2022	158	England	Mary Forsyth	
2022	159	United States	Kathy Flores	
2022	160	New Zealand	Fiao'o Fa'amausili	
2023	161	England	The Varsity Matches	
2023	162	New Zealand	Dan Carter	
2023	163	France	Thierry Dusautoir	
2023	164	Australia	George Smith	
2023	165	Argentina	Juan Martín Hernández	
2023	166	South Africa	Bryan Habana	
2024	167	Australia	Emilee Cherry	
2024	168	New Zealand	DJ Forbes	
2024	169	Italy	Sergio Parisse	
2024	170	Scotland	Donna Kennedy	
2024	171	New Zealand	Chris Laidlaw	
2025	172	Ireland	Lynne Cantwell	
2025	173	Australia	Matthew Burke	
2025	174	England	Richard Hill	
2025	175	England	Rochelle "Rocky" Clark	
2026	176	South Africa	Joel Stransky	
2026	177	New Zealand	Zinzan Brooke	
2026	178	England	Sue Day	
2026	179	United States	Jen Crawford	
2026	180	New Zealand	Rochelle Martin	
2026	181	Italy	Diego Dominguez	
2026	182	France	Abdelatif Benazzi	

== See also ==
- International Rugby Hall of Fame – merged into the World Rugby Hall of Fame in 2014 and 2015
- World Rugby Museum – a celebration of the best international players to have played at Twickenham Stadium
