= Janet Gedrych =

Welsh rugby union player and disciplinary official

- Full name: Janet Anne Gedrych
- Born: 1958 (age 67–68) East Glamorgan, Wales
- School: Olchfa School
- University: University of Warwick

Rugby union career
- Position: Scrum-half
Amateur team(s)
Years	Team	Apps	(Points)
–	University of Warwick		
–	Finchley		
–	Richmond Women		
International career
Years	Team	Apps	(Points)
1986	Great Britain	1	
1990	Wales	1	

Janet Anne Gedrych (born 1958) is a Welsh former rugby union player and rugby disciplinary official. She represented both the Great Britain and Wales national teams, and later served on disciplinary panels in professional rugby competitions. A scrum-half later in her playing career, she scored a try on her international debut for Wales in 1990.

== Early life and education ==
Gedrych was born in East Glamorgan and raised in Swansea, where she attended Olchfa School. She is one of four children of David A. Gedrych and Beryl Gedrych (née Brown).

She later studied law at the University of Warwick, where she first became involved in rugby union during a period in which the women's game was still developing in Britain. While at Warwick, she combined playing with administrative responsibilities, and in 1980 she was elected Athletics Union chairman, reflecting her early involvement in the organisation of university sport.

== Rugby career ==
=== University and early career ===
Gedrych began playing rugby around 1980 and became part of the University of Warwick women's team, which contemporary reports described as among the leading sides in Britain. In 1982 she toured the United States with the Warwick squad, playing matches in California and Las Vegas. The tour included a 24–0 victory over Fresno, and Gedrych later described it as “a marvellous trip”, noting the enthusiasm for rugby in the United States and the efforts being made to develop the game.

=== Club career ===
After leaving university, Gedrych first played for Finchley RFC and then its successor, Richmond Women. While at Richmond, she was part of a side that undertook an unbeaten tour of New Zealand in 1989, playing nine matches over three weeks. The tour was a significant milestone in the international development of women's club rugby.

=== International career ===
Gedrych first gained international recognition as a flanker, representing the Great Britain side against France in 1986. She was subsequently selected for the Wales squad in 1987 for their match against England at Pontypool Park, although she did not take the field.

By 1990 she had established herself as a scrum-half and was selected for Wales for the Rice Challenge Cup international against England at The Gnoll in Neath. Making her debut on 11 February 1990 at the age of 30, she was described in contemporary reports as a “new cap”. Gedrych scored a try on her debut, helping Wales to a 12–4 half-time lead, although England ultimately won the match 18–12. She formed part of the half-back partnership with Lesley Brooks and was noted for her defensive pressure.

In April 2022, more than three decades after her playing career, Gedrych was formally presented with her Wales cap by the Welsh Rugby Union. The presentation formed part of a retrospective recognition programme for early women's internationals, many of whom had not received official caps at the time of their appearances.

== Legal career and rugby administration ==
Gedrych trained in law at the University of Warwick and worked as a civil servant in London during her playing career. She later qualified as a barrister and practised at Angel Chambers in Swansea.

In her legal career, Gedrych specialised in criminal law and appeared in cases at Swansea Crown Court. She acted both for the prosecution and the defence, including prosecuting in cases involving burglary and theft, and representing defendants in drug-related and violent offences.

Her legal background informed her later involvement in rugby governance. Gedrych has served as a disciplinary official in professional rugby, sitting on judicial panels in competitions including the United Rugby Championship. In this role she has been involved in reviewing citing decisions and determining sanctions in cases of foul play at elite level.

In 2021, she was a member of a disciplinary panel that reviewed a citing against Adré Smith, resulting in a suspension after the panel determined that the offence met the red-card threshold.
