= Debbie Francis =

England and Scotland rugby union player

- Born: Deborah Anne MacLaren; 1 June 1964 (age 62) Bristol, England
- Height: 1.68 m (5 ft 6 in)
- Weight: 64 kg (141 lb)

Rugby union career
- Position: Wing
Amateur team(s)
Years	Team	Apps	(Points)
–	Finchley RFC		
–	Richmond Women		
International career
Years	Team	Apps	(Points)
1986–1990	Great Britain XV	8	
1987–1992	England	12	
1993–	Scotland		
Medal record
Women's rugby union
Representing England
Rugby World Cup
Silver medal – second place	1991 England	Team competition

Deborah Anne Francis (née MacLaren; born 1 June 1964) is a former rugby union international who represented England, Scotland, and a Great Britain XV during the formative years of the women's game. A winger known for her pace and finishing ability, she was part of the England side that reached the final of the 1991 Women's Rugby World Cup.

== Early life and background ==
Francis was born in Bristol and educated at George Watson's College in Edinburgh where she was a contemporary of Scott Hastings. She went on to study at the University of Leeds. She was raised in a rugby-oriented environment with links to Watsonians RFC.

Before focusing on rugby union, she was an accomplished athlete and represented Scotland in cross-country running. She was also reported to have held a Scottish junior sprint record, a background that contributed significantly to her pace on the rugby field. While at Leeds she remained active in sport, representing the university in field hockey in 1984.

== Rugby career ==
=== Early development and Great Britain ===
Francis began playing rugby in the early 1980s with Finchley RFC, developing quickly in a period when women's rugby had limited formal international structures. Her pace and athleticism brought her to prominence, and in April 1986 she was selected for a Great Britain XV to face the France women's national team. Francis continued to represent Great Britain into the late 1980s, earning eight caps and establishing herself as a dangerous attacking winger.

=== England and Richmond ===
Although born in England, Francis qualified to represent England during a period in which Scotland did not yet have a national women's side. By 1987 she was part of the first England women's international team and became a regular selection on the wing. Her international development took place alongside her club career, initially with Finchley RFC and then with Richmond F.C., where she established herself as one of the leading players of the era. At Richmond she was part of a side that helped to drive the growth and visibility of women's rugby, combining structured play with an expansive, pace-oriented attacking style. During this period she played in a landmark match between Richmond and Wasps Women at Twickenham Stadium, widely regarded as the first women's match staged at the venue and an early sign of the sport's increasing recognition.

She featured prominently in England's early internationals, including fixtures against Wales and Sweden, where her speed and finishing ability made her a consistent attacking threat. By 1990 she had accumulated fourteen international caps across Great Britain and England. She went on to win twelve caps for England overall and appeared in every international played by the side up to and including the inaugural 1991 Women's Rugby World Cup. At the tournament she played in all of England's matches and scored tries as the team reached the final, where they were defeated by the United States.

She also scored the first try by a woman at Cardiff Arms Park.

=== Scotland ===
With the establishment of Scotland’s women's national side in the early 1990s, Francis chose to represent her country of upbringing. She had previously played for England due to the absence of a Scottish team, but was selected for Scotland once international fixtures became available. She made her debut in Scotland's first international match against Ireland on 14 February 1993 and remained part of the squad during the team's early development, including the 1994 Women's Rugby World Cup.

== Playing style ==
Francis played as a winger and was widely regarded as one of the fastest players in the women's game during her era. Her background in sprinting and cross-country running contributed to her acceleration and endurance, enabling her to exploit space effectively in wide positions. She developed a reputation as a clinical finisher, frequently converting attacking opportunities into tries, and was credited with scoring more than 300 tries during her career. Contemporary descriptions of the women's game emphasised skill, movement and tactical awareness, and her playing style reflected these qualities.

== Personal life ==
In 1988 she became engaged to rugby coach Mark Francis, and the couple married in 1989. Following her marriage she was known as Debbie Francis in her rugby career. Her husband's work in rugby coaching, included roles within women's rugby in England, Scotland and Great Britain.

During her playing career, Francis lived in Surrey where she combined international rugby with her work as an insolvency administrator.

Francis and her husband have two sons. After having her first child in 1992 she continued to compete at international level shortly after giving birth. She later stated that she had unknowingly played a match in the early stages of pregnancy, discovering afterwards that she had been five weeks pregnant.
