= Loughborough Students RUFC =

English rugby union club, based in Loughborough

Loughborough Students
- Full name: Loughborough Students Rugby Football Club
- Union: Leicestershire RU
- Founded: 1919; 107 years ago
- Location: Loughborough, Leicestershire, England
- Ground(s): Loughborough University Stadium (3,000), East Park (1,000)
- Chairman: Twm Owen
- Coach(es): Martin Webdale, Alex White, Brad Jones
- Captain: Seb Rodriguez-Davies
- League(s): National League 2 West; BUCS Super Rugby and Premier North A
- 2025-26: 13th
Team kit

Official website
- www.lboro.ac.uk/sport/sports/rugby-union/

Loughborough Students Rugby Football Club represents Loughborough University in rugby union competition. Of the British universities, Loughborough has unparalleled success, having won the BUCS championship (in its former guises as the BUSA and UAU championship) on twenty-seven occasions and fields five sides in the BUCS league (inter-university). The first team play in National League 2 West, the fourth tier of the English rugby union system; finishing in 13th position, they were originally relegated to Regional 1 Midlands, but were given a reprieve when Macclesfield declined to be level transferred from National League 2 North to National League 2 West and were thus relegated to Regional 1 North West.

The club has fielded over seventy internationals (male and female), many of whom won caps while playing for the club.

== History ==
=== Loughborough Colleges ===
The history of the club predates the formation of Loughborough University. The students of Loughborough College formed what is considered the original side in September 1919. Loughborough began competing in the Universities Athletic Union (UAU) in the 1930–31, and the Loughborough Colleges XV beat Nottingham University 8 – 0 in their first match. It was not until 1939 that the Loughborough Colleges reached the UAU final for the first time. They lost in a closely fought match to Swansea, whose win was the sixth in seven seasons.

It was in the post-Second World War period that Loughborough's reputation began to be made. Two future captains of England, Eric Evans and Jeff Butterfield played for the club in this period, as did Ray Williams, who eventually became Secretary of the Welsh Rugby Union. It was no surprise when, in 1953, Loughborough Colleges finally won the UAU for the first time. The club became one of the Midlands leading clubs and in 1959 they won the Middlesex Sevens.

In the sixties an already impressive fixture list was enhanced by John Robins, the coach from 1962. It included Leicester, Gloucester, Rosslyn Park, Moseley and London Irish. John Robins went on to become the first British Lions coach. During his tenure at Loughborough, the UAU was won from 1962 to 1968 with only 1965 eluding the club. John Robins left Loughborough in 1967, and was replaced by the Scotland and Lions international Jim Greenwood. In 1970 Greenwood coached the Colleges to victory in the Middlesex Sevens, and in the first Twickenham UAU final, the Colleges beat Nottingham University 22 – 3. The 1970–71 side included six future internationals, Lewis Dick, David Cooke, Clive Rees, Fran Cotton, Steve Smith, and Dick Cowman. While at Loughborough, Jim Greenwood's pivotal coaching books, "Total Rugby" and "Think Rugby", were penned.

=== Loughborough University is formed ===
In 1976, the Students' Unions of the University of Technology and the Loughborough Colleges merged and the Loughborough Students Rugby Club was formed. The first Chairman of the new club was Tony Field. The team won the Middlesex 7s for the first and only time as Loughborough Students, Loughborough Colleges having won it four times previously. The team won the UAU in 1977, 1978 and 1979, with the 1978–79 side captained by the young centre Clive Woodward.

Rex Hazeldine, later England's first fitness coach, replaced Greenwood and is credited with being an integral part of the revolution of attitudes to the game at international level. In 1984 the UAU was won once again, as was the Leicestershire Cup. A touring Australian Universities side was also defeated. In the 1985–86 season a team led by Andy Robinson won through to the third round of the John Player Cup, going out to London Wasps. The same team won the UAU Championships.

=== Joining the RFU League ===
At the inception of the RFU League, the team was offered a place in National 2. They turned this down and in 1996, when the Students did apply to join they had to join at the bottom of the league system. It was soon apparent that the standard of rugby at the university had been left behind by the professional teams in the league and in 1998 a full-time Director of Rugby, Ian "Dosser" Smith, was appointed. Alan Buzza took over from Smith in 2001 and is credited with modernizing the club. League promotions in 2001–02 and 2002–03 engendered confidence and the club was further enhanced by the presence of a number of excellent players including Tom Evans Jones, Edward Binham, Justin Abrahams, Andy Vilk, Peter Janes, James Jones, Sam Ulph and captain Charlie Cooper. As far as a British Universities championship win was concerned, however, the drought continued until, under the coach Paul Westgate, back to back wins were achieved in 2005 and 2006. Dave Morris took over as head coach from Westgate and immediately gained League promotion in 2007 to Midlands 1. The next season promotion was achieved to National League 2 North making the team the first student side to take part in the National Leagues. They finished in sixth place and in the same season achieved a win over England under-20s.

== Current standings ==
2026–27 National League 2 West table
Pos	Team	Pld	W	D	L	PF	PA	PD	TB	LB	Pts	Qualification
1	Redruth	6	6	0	0	265	121	+144	5	0	29	Promotion place
2	Taunton Titans	6	5	0	1	264	132	+132	5	1	26	Promotion play-off
3	Hinckley	6	5	0	1	253	108	+145	5	0	25	
4	Luctonians	6	5	0	1	198	129	+69	5	0	25	
5	Clifton	6	5	0	1	240	189	+51	5	0	25	
6	Lymm	6	4	0	2	198	202	−4	5	1	22	
7	Old Redcliffians	6	3	0	3	194	188	+6	5	1	18	
8	Cinderford	6	3	0	3	222	250	−28	5	0	17	
9	Loughborough Students	6	2	0	4	197	236	−39	5	1	14	
10	Hornets	6	1	0	5	180	200	−20	4	4	12	
11	Barnstaple	6	2	0	4	139	174	−35	2	1	11	
12	Bournville	6	1	0	5	212	348	−136	5	1	10	Relegation play-off
13	Devonport Services	6	0	0	6	145	294	−149	3	1	4	Relegation place
14	Exeter University	6	0	0	6	140	276	−136	2	0	2	Relegation place

Updated to match(es) played on 5 September 2026. Source: National League Rugby
Rules for classification: If teams are level at any stage, tiebreakers are applied in the following order:
1. Number of matches won
2. Number of matches drawn
3. Difference between points for and against
4. Total number of points for
5. Aggregate number of points scored in matches between tied teams
6. Number of matches won excluding the first match, then the second and so on until the tie is settled

== Honours ==
- Melrose Sevens winners (2): 1968, 1969
- Middlesex Sevens winners (5): 1959, 1964, 1966, 1970, 1976
- Glengarth Sevens Main Event winners (2): 1968, 1970
- Gala Sevens winners (1): 1965
- Leicestershire County Cup winners (7): 1977–78, 1983–84, 1984–85, 1990–91, 1993–94, 1998–99, 2005–06
- East Midlands/Leicestershire 4 champions: 1995–96
- Leicestershire 1 champions: 1996–97
- Midlands 4 East (North) champions: 2001–02
- Midlands 3 East (north v south) promotion play-off winner: 2002–03
- Midlands Division 2 East champions: 2006–07
- Midlands Division 1 champions: 2007–08
- National League 2 South champions: 2011–12

== Former players ==
=== Men ===
==== British and Irish Lions ====
- Jeff Butterfield (England)
- Fran Cotton (England)
- Gerald Davies (Wales)
- John Dawes (Wales)
- Tony Diprose (England)
- Gareth Griffiths (Wales)
- Ben Kay (England)
- Colin McFadyean (England)
- Eric Miller (Ireland)
- Alun Pask (Wales)
- Clive Rees (Wales)
- Bev Risman (England))
- John Robins (Wales)
- Keith Savage (England)
- Ollie Smith (England)
- John Taylor (Wales)
- Clive Woodward (England)

==== England ====
- Tom Brophy
- Phil Burgess (Sevens)
- Jeff Butterfield
- Phil Christophers
- David Cooke
- Fran Cotton
- Dick Cowman
- Tony Diprose
- Dave Egerton
- Ayoola Erinle
- Eric Evans
- Keith Fielding
- Mike Gavins
- David Hazel
- Dan Hipkiss
- Roger Hosen
- Ben Kay
- Colin McFadyean
- Mark Mapletoft
- John Pallant
- Derek Prout
- Bev Risman
- Andy Robinson
- Dave Rollitt
- Bob Rowell
- Keith Savage
- Ollie Smith
- Steve Smith
- Phil Taylor
- Andy Vilk (Sevens)
- Bryan West
- Lionel Weston
- Brian Whightman
- Roy Winters
- Clive Woodward
- Will Edwards (Sevens)
- Freddie Steward
- Dan Kelly

==== Ireland ====
- Ken Armstrong
- Jonny Bell
- Mark Bruce (Sevens)
- Paul Burke
- Niall Malone
- Eric Miller

==== Scotland ====
- Adam Buchanan-Smith
- Henry Pyrgos
- Jim Davidson
- Lewis Dick
- Andrew MacDonald
- Robert MacEwen
- Alex Allan (rugby union)
- Eric Peters

==== Wales ====
- Gerald Davies
- Rhodri Gomer-Davies (Sevens)
- John Dawes
- Gareth Griffiths
- Will Harries (Sevens)
- Dai Haywood
- Leighton Jenkins
- Derwyn Jones
- Ken Jones
- John Mantle
- Alun Pask
- John Robins
- John Taylor
- Clive Rees

==== Other countries ====
- Mario Pichardie - Spain
- Thibaud Flament – France
- Ashley Billington – Hong Kong
- Mark Wright – Hong Kong
- Ed Rolston – Hong Kong
- Liam McGilligan - Singapore
- Pete Williams – Singapore
- Iain Mc Mullan – Singapore
- Bill Hayward – United States
- Alex Almeida – Canada
- Daniel Hamilton-Strong - Germany

=== Women ===
==== England ====
- Nicky Ponsford
- Sam Robson
- Karen Almond (and Great Britain)
- Pip Atkinson (and Great Britain)
- Emma Mitchell
- Charlotte Barras
- Lois Moulding
- Kim Shaylor
- Katie Mullen
- Sally Cockerill
- Sarah Hunter (Captain)
- Olivia Poore
- Vicky McQeen
- Roz Jermaine (nee Crowley)
- Vicky Jackson
- Sophie Nicholas (Sevens)
- Claire Allen
- Becky Essex

==== Great Britain ====
- Karen Almond (and England)
- Pip Atkinson (and England)
- Amanda Bennett (and Wales)
- Liza Burgess (and Wales)
- Val Moore also England women's team manager (1994 World Cup winner)

==== Ireland ====
- Jo O'Sullivan
- Judith Wilson
- Joy Sparkes

==== Scotland ====
- Lyndsey Douglas

==== Wales ====
- Amanda Bennett (and Great Britain)
- Liza Burgess (and Great Britain)
- Belinda Trotter
- Jenna Studley
- Laura Prosser
- Louise Rickard
