= Tricia King =

English rugby union player, club founder and higher-education executive

- Full name: Patricia Ann King
- Born: Patricia Ann Moore; 1961 (age 64–65) Enfield, Middlesex, England
- University: University of York
- Occupation(s): Rugby union player, journalist, communications executive, consultant

Rugby union career
- Position: Lock
Amateur team(s)
Years	Team	Apps	(Points)
–	Finchley RFC Ladies		
–	Exeter Ladies RFC		
International career
Years	Team	Apps	(Points)
1986	Great Britain		
1987	England		

Patricia Ann "Tricia" King (née Moore; born 1961) is an English former rugby union player, club founder and higher-education executive. Playing primarily as a lock, she represented both Great Britain and England during the formative years of women's international rugby union. She founded Exeter Ladies RFC, captained the club, and played in England's first official women's international match against Wales in 1987.

== Early life and education ==
King was born in Enfield, Middlesex, and grew up in a family of Irish heritage. Her parents were Irish immigrants and she later maintained strong links with County Kerry, particularly North Kerry.

She studied English at the University of York.

== Rugby career ==
King belonged to the pioneering generation of women who helped establish organised women's rugby union in Britain during the 1980s. She began playing rugby around 1980 and was associated with Finchley RFC Ladies, one of England's earliest women's rugby clubs. A contemporary newspaper report published in 1986 described her as an England Women's rugby international playing for Finchley RFC Ladies.

Alongside her playing career, King became involved in the administration and promotion of the women's game. She served as a volunteer press officer for the Women's Rugby Football Union and represented the Great Britain women's rugby union team during the period before the establishment of separate national women's sides. At this time she was working as a journalist and publicity officer in Exeter.

After moving to Exeter, King founded Exeter Ladies Rugby Club and became one of the leading figures in the development of women's rugby in south-west England. Playing in the second row, she captained the side and helped establish it as a competitive force in the women's game. Under her leadership Exeter enjoyed a highly successful 1986–87 season, winning 13 of 14 matches in Wales and the Western Region.

King's rugby career reached its highest level in 1987 when she was selected for England's first official women's international match against Wales at Pontypool Park. England won the match 22–4, with King playing in the second row. She was among the first group of players to be capped by the England women's national side and is recorded as England women's cap number 7.

During 1987 she temporarily stepped away from playing following the birth of her first child, but remained involved with Exeter through coaching and club development. By 1989 King had returned to the Exeter side. In a league match against Clifton she scored Exeter's only try in a 22–4 defeat.

== Professional career ==
Alongside her rugby career, King worked in journalism, communications and public relations. In 1987 she was appointed publicity manager of the Northcott Theatre in Exeter.

She later established a successful career in higher education, holding senior positions at Birkbeck, University of London, including Director of External Relations and Pro-Vice-Master for Strategic Engagement.

King subsequently became vice president for Global Engagement at the Council for Advancement and Support of Education (CASE), working with institutions across the international higher-education sector.

She later founded TKCC Consultancy & Coaching and worked as a consultant, leadership adviser and executive coach.

== Personal life ==
King married Roger King in 1986. Roger King was involved in rugby as both a coach of Exeter Ladies and a member of Finchley RFC.

Outside rugby, King has also been involved in other sports. She has played county netball, managed the Great Britain korfball squad and has been described by Birkbeck as a "fanatical sportswoman" who represented both England and Great Britain in rugby union.
