= Carol Isherwood =

British Lions & England international rugby union player

Carol Isherwood OBE
- Born: 27 July 1961 (age 65) Leigh, Greater Manchester, England

Rugby union career
International career
Years	Team	Apps	(Points)
1986	Great Britain	8	
1987-1992	England	7	
Medal record
Representing England
Women's rugby union
Rugby World Cup
Silver medal – second place	1991 Wales	Team competition

Carol Isherwood OBE (born 27 July 1961) is an English former rugby union player and a founding member of the Rugby Football Union for Women. She captained Great Britain against France in 1986. She then captained England in their first game against Wales a year later.

Isherwood was born in Leigh, Greater Manchester, England. She first became involved in rugby in 1981 while studying at Leeds University when she set up a women's team. Carol graduated from Leeds in History 1982, followed by a PGCE in 1984. Isherwood was appointed an Officer of the Order of the British Empire (OBE) in the 2003 Birthday Honours for services to women's rugby. Isherwood was the first woman appointed to the IRB Rugby Committee in September 2009. She was one of the first six women inducted into the IRB Hall of Fame in November 2014.
