= Val Moore =

England rugby union player and team manager

- Full name: Valerie Janet Moore
- Born: June 1962 (age 64) Uxbridge, England
- School: John Cleveland College, Hinckley
- University: Loughborough University; London South Bank University
- Occupation(s): Teacher; public health leader; swimming coach

Rugby union career
- Position: Full back
Amateur team(s)
Years	Team	Apps	(Points)
–	Loughborough University		
–	Wasps Ladies		
–	Ely Ladies		
International career
Years	Team	Apps	(Points)
1986-1988	Great Britain	2	

Valerie Janet Moore (born June 1962), known as Val Moore, is an English former rugby union player and team manager, later working in public health and coaching. A full back in her playing career, she represented Great Britain and was involved with the England women's national team during the 1980s. She later became manager of the England women's side, working with the team at the 1991 Women's Rugby World Cup and then managing the squad that won the 1994 Women's Rugby World Cup.

== Early life and education ==
Moore was born in Uxbridge, England, in June 1962. She grew up in Hinckley, Leicestershire, where she first emerged as a multi-sport athlete. In 1976 she represented Mount Grace School at the Leicestershire and Rutland athletics championships. She later attended John Cleveland College, Hinckley, and in 1977 played hockey for the school in the Leicestershire and Rutland under-15 championship.

By 1978 she was playing club hockey for Hinckley Ladies' Hockey Club and had progressed through junior county trials, being named as a reserve when the county teams were selected. In 1980 she was still competing in county junior hockey, scoring in representative competition. Her hockey career continued at university level. While at Loughborough University, she was selected as one of five players for a British women's team at a European Universities hockey tournament, and was later described as a former English Universities hockey player.

== Rugby career ==
=== Transition from hockey and early club rugby ===
Moore took up women's rugby while a student at Loughborough University in around 1982, at a time when the women's game in Britain was still in its formative phase.

At club level she became a player for Wasps Ladies, then one of the strongest sides in women's rugby. At that time, Moore's regular routine involved travelling to London either to train with the men at Saracens or with the women at Wasps, underlining how the sport still depended on players crossing between club structures and borrowing whatever facilities were available. In October 1985 she was among the try-scorers in Wasps' 26–4 win over Old Windsorians Ladies. She continued to regularly play for Wasps and was in the team that won the Women's RUFC Tournament Trophy in its first year. That match between Wasps and Richmond was the first time women had played at Twickenham. It drew television coverage and symbolised the growing visibility of the women's game.

=== International rugby ===
In April 1986, Moore, then aged 23 and working as a biology teacher at St John Fisher School in Peterborough, was selected at full back for the first international women's rugby match played in England, in which the British Women's RUFC XV faced France in London. Britain led 8–4 at half-time before losing 14–8, and Moore later recalled the significance of the day, noting that about 800 spectators attended and that the crowd atmosphere reinforced the sense that the match had been a landmark for women's rugby in Britain.

By 1987 she had become part of both the England and Great Britain squads. The Cambridge Daily News described her as a 25-year-old full back whose "main commitment" was still to Wasps, but who had spent the previous season as a member of "the two national squads" and hoped to play for Great Britain against Holland at Richmond later that year. A 1988 Ely match report referred to her as an "England squad member", confirming that she remained in contention at the top level while combining club, county and development work.

Moore's final cap for Great Britain came in the European Cup in 1988, when Great Britain were runners-up. Although a Great Britain player, and England squad member, Moore never represented England, despite having "picked up the odd splinter on the England bench from 1986–88". Injury curtailed her international playing career. By 1989 she was describing a nagging back injury as the factor that had prevented further international appearances, and in 1994 The Independent reported that she was sidelined with a knee injury while still involved in the sport.

=== Ely, coaching and development work ===
Moore's significance in early women's rugby lay not only in her own playing career but in her role as a builder of the game. In 1987 she helped launch a women's team at Ely, combining playing, coaching and organisational work while still pursuing selection for Wasps and Great Britain. The same year she completed the Eastern Counties intermediate coaching course, finishing first in theory and second in practical work against an otherwise all-male group. In February 1988, Moore scored a hat-trick of tries and added two conversions in a 24–0 win over Cambridge University. Later that month she was described as having helped form the club and now coaching it, while still playing most of her rugby for Wasps and remaining "on the fringe of an England place". By April 1988 Ely were being described as winning "even without their coach and mentor Val Moore".

== England team management ==
Moore later moved from player to administrator and became an important figure in the early management of the England women's national side. Moore was the England team manager in 1990 for their match against Wales. By March and April 1991 she was firmly established as England women's team manager. A Sunday Mirror feature ahead of the first Women's Rugby World Cup in 1991 described her as manager of the 30-strong England squad, while a Wales on Sunday report during the tournament quoted "England team manager Val Moore" discussing opposition, continuity and selection. England finished runners-up in that tournament.

She remained in post through the early 1990s and was manager for the 1994 Women's Rugby World Cup. Her role extended far beyond conventional management. She was involved in securing sponsorship, arranging tracksuits and shirts, sourcing transport support, organising accommodation and dealing with the chronic underfunding of the women's game. This was during a time when players had to appeal to their clubs for financial help, that the 36-strong party had to cover tracksuits, T-shirts and sweatshirts costing £85 per person, and that some players who could not afford even discounted hotel bills stayed with friends in Edinburgh. Moore was also quoted on the difficulty of raising even modest sponsorship sums, noting her delight when a cider company donated £500, £100 of which immediately went on embroidery for the sponsor's name.

Moore managed the England women's side for four years and finished after England won the 1994 World Cup.

== Teaching career ==
Moore's rugby years ran alongside a teaching career. In 1986 she was a biology teacher at St John Fisher School in Peterborough at the time of her international debut. By 1987 she was teaching at Soham Village College working in biology, physical activity and personal and social health education.

== Public health career ==
After leaving full-time teaching, Moore moved into public health. She worked with Cambridgeshire Health Authority from 1989, initially in health promotion and later in senior advisory and leadership roles. She subsequently worked as Regional Associate Director at the Health Development Agency and then joined the National Institute for Health and Care Excellence (NICE), where she held senior implementation roles between 2005 and 2015. By 2021 she was serving as Chair of Healthwatch Cambridgeshire and Peterborough, a role in which she spoke publicly on NHS staff support, end-of-life decision-making, health inequalities and fair access to healthcare innovation. The East and North Hertfordshire NHS Trust board papers published in 2024 described her as a former NICE implementation director, former Chair of Healthwatch Cambridgeshire and Peterborough, and a Non-Executive Director of the trust.

== Swimming and later activities ==
Moore later developed a new sporting identity in open-water swimming. In her own account, this began with a swimming holiday in Croatia in 2008 with her partner, despite her not then being an effective front-crawl swimmer. Over the following years she became a committed open-water swimmer, later working as a coach and lifeguard and founding Toe in Swim. Her swimming work focused on confidence-building, safe acclimatisation to cold water and widening access to open-water swimming, including women-focused initiatives and support for less confident or less represented swimmers.
