= Deborah Griffin =

English rugby union player

Deborah Griffin OBE is a pioneer of the growth of women's rugby, both in England and globally.

== Biography ==
Griffin took up the sport of rugby at University College London. She played in the first game of Women’s rugby in England against King’s College London in March 1978. In 1984, Deborah captained the first Women’s club side in England at Finchley RFC. After 2 years, the team moved to Richmond RFC, after Finchley RFC refused to admit female members.

Deborah was one of the founding members of the Women’s Rugby Football Union in 1983. She also was one of the principal organisers of the 1991 Women's Rugby World Cup, the first ever Women's Rugby World Cup, which was run despite having no support or financial backing from the International Rugby Board. Griffin later became the first female elected board member of the England Rugby Football Union (RFU) in 2014.

Griffin was appointed an Officer of the Order of the British Empire (OBE) in the 2011 Birthday Honours for services to Women's Rugby.

In April 2018, Griffin became the first female member of the RFU to be elected to the World Rugby Council. In August 2025 she became the first female president of the RFU.

She currently splits her time in between Cambridge and Twickenham. She has two children, Victoria and Laurence, who reside in New York and London respectively.

== World Rugby Hall of Fame ==
Griffin and the three other women (Alice Cooper, Sue Dorrington and Mary Forsyth) who organised the first Women's Rugby World Cup in Wales, were inducted into the World Rugby Hall of Fame in a special ceremony during the 2021 Rugby World Cup semi-finals at Eden Park on 5 November 2022.
