= Pip Atkinson =

England rugby union player

Pip Atkinson-Kennedy
- Full name: Phillippa G. Atkinson
- Born: 13 December 1964 (age 61) Hong Kong
- School: Millfield School
- University: Loughborough University
- Occupation(s): Physical education teacher, sports administrator

Rugby union career
- Position: Wing
Amateur team(s)
| Years | Team | Apps | (Points) |
| – | Loughborough University RUFC | | |
| – | Newport Ladies | | |
| – | Clifton Ladies RFC | | |
International career
| Years | Team | Apps | (Points) |
| 1986 | Great Britain | 2 | |
| 1987–1998 | England | 22 | |
Medal record
Representing England
Women's rugby union
Rugby World Cup
| Bronze medal – third place | 1998 Netherlands | Team competition |

Pip Atkinson-Kennedy (née Atkinson, later Spivey; born 13 December 1964) is a former England international rugby union player. A winger, she was among the pioneering generation of women's rugby players, representing Great Britain in 1986 and playing in the first England women's international in 1987. She later returned to the international game in the 1990s, earning 22 caps for England and appearing at the 1998 Women's Rugby World Cup. She also played, captained and coached England in rugby sevens, including participation in the first Hong Kong Women's Sevens tournament.

== Early life and education ==
Born in Hong Kong, where she spent the first three years of her life, Atkinson was raised in Glastonbury, Somerset, and educated at Millfield School. A gifted all-round sportswoman, she competed in swimming and modern pentathlon and was also ranked nationally in tetrathlon, triathlon and indoor rowing. She went on to study sports science at Loughborough University, which was a major centre for the emerging women's game and supplied several players to the first England team.

== Playing career ==
Atkinson developed as a rugby player at Loughborough University, where she was coached by Jim Greenwood. By 1986 she had established herself as a dynamic winger, noted for her pace and attacking play. That year she represented Great Britain against France in one of the earliest women's internationals, before being selected for England's inaugural international match against Wales in 1987, a game in which she scored two tries.

Her club career included spells with Newport Ladies and later Clifton Ladies RFC, while she also represented regional sides including the Midlands and South West. During the late 1980s, when opportunities in women’s rugby were still limited, she spent approximately 15 months in Australia, where she continued her sporting development by playing premier league touch rugby. While there she met Australian decathlete Mark Spivey, whom she later married.

Returning to England in the mid-1990s and competing under the name Pip Spivey, she resumed her rugby career with Clifton and re-established herself at international level. During this period she scored a hat-trick for England A against the Netherlands and went on to accumulate 22 caps for England, in addition to her earlier appearances for Great Britain. She was also closely involved in the development of rugby sevens, playing, captaining and later coaching the England side, and took part in the inaugural Hong Kong Women’s Sevens tournament. Her representative career also included overseas tours such as a visit to Bermuda.

In 1998 she was selected for England’s squad at the 1998 Women's Rugby World Cup in the Netherlands, bringing her international career to a close shortly afterwards.

== Coaching and teaching career ==
Alongside her playing career, Atkinson worked as a physical education teacher and was an early advocate for girls’ rugby in schools. By 1989 she was a games teacher at Redland High School in Bristol, where she introduced rugby for girls.

She later held senior roles including Head of Girls' Sport at Wells Cathedral School and a teaching position at Dean Close School in Cheltenham. By 2019 she was Director of Sport at King's Bruton, continuing to promote girls’ sport while also remaining active in equestrian competition.

== Personal life ==
Atkinson married Australian decathlete Mark Spivey in 1990 and subsequently competed under the name Pip Spivey. She later married Peter J. C. Kennedy in 2003. Kennedy coached the England women’s national team between 1999 and 2002, leading the side to two Grand Slams. She has since been known as Pip Atkinson-Kennedy.
