= Jane Mitchell =

British pharmacologist

Jane Mitchell is a professor of pharmacology in clinical care medicine at Imperial College London. Her research focusses on the regulation of cardiovascular health and disease, with a particular interest in endothelial cells, prostacyclin (a platelet activator and vasodilator), and nitric oxide.

She finished her PhD with Nobel Laureate John Vane and worked as a postdoctoral fellow with another Nobel Laureate: Ferid Murad. She became a professor when she was 38. Mitchell won the Novartis Prize for Pharmacology in 1999 for her work on cyclooxygeanse biology. In 2012, she won the AstraZeneca Prize for Women in Pharmacology.

Mitchell grew up in a coal mining town. People around her frequently died young from cardiovascular and respiratory diseases, which inspired her to pursue a career in clinical research, with a focus on hearts and lungs. She studied biological sciences at Lancaster University.
