= Wasps Women =

English women's rugby union team

- Full name: Wasps Women
- Union: RFU
- Nickname: Wasps
- Founded: 1984
- Location: Acton, London, England
- Ground: Twyford Avenue Sports Ground
- Coach: LJ Lewis
- Captain: Liz Crake
- League: Premier 15s

Wasps Women are a women's rugby union based in Acton, London, England. They were founded in 1984 and play in the Premier 15s. They are the women's team of Wasps FC, who are affiliated to Premiership Rugby team Wasps. They play their home matches at Wasps FC's Twyford Avenue Sports Ground.

== History ==
Wasps Women was founded in 1984 by Sue Martineau and have played in the top flight of English women's rugby union since 1991 as they were not involved in the first season of the Women's Premiership in 1990. In 1992, they won the Women's National 7s title. They have won league titles including three consecutive wins between 2001 and 2004, including a league and cup double in 2004. Aside of their local rivalries with fellow London clubs Saracens Women and Richmond Women, Wasps Women also have a rivalry with Bristol Bears Women, formally Clifton Ladies. Wasps Women run two teams with Wasps Women II playing in Championship 2 South West after being relegated from Championship 1 South in 2013.

Being affiliated to Wasps, Wasps Women have played matches at the Coventry Building Society Arena in Coventry and Wasps' former home ground, Adams Park in High Wycombe, Buckinghamshire. Wasps Women also take part in charity games, including playing against Guernsey Ladies in Sark.

In July 2021; in line with a company wide rebrand, the team were rebranded Wasps Women having previously been called Wasps Ladies.

== Notable players ==
Wasps Women have provided a number of players for international teams. Sue Day and Shelley Rae played for both Wasps Women and the England women's national rugby union team. Stephanie Te Ohaere-Fox played for both Wasps Women and the New Zealand women's national rugby union team. Giselle Mather (née Prangnell), played for Wasps from 1992 to 1998 and later coached the team from 2001 to 2004 and also from 2016 to 2022. She is a former English rugby union international and coach, won 34 caps for England, part of the 1994 Women's World Cup winning side, first woman to achieve level 4 coaching status from the RFU, first woman to coach a male rugby union side, first coach of the Women's Barbarians and from 2024 coach of the Great Britain women's national rugby sevens team squad.

- Karen Almond – England and Great Britain international rugby union player. Captained England to victory in the 1994 Women's Rugby World Cup.
- Val Moore – Great Britain international and England women's team manager (1994 World Cup winner)
