= Karen Almond =

England rugby union player

- Full name: Karen Jane Almond
- Born: 18 December 1962 (age 63) Kingston upon Hull, England
- Height: 1.69 m (5 ft 7 in)
- Weight: 59 kg (130 lb)
- Occupation: Physical education teacher

Rugby union career
- Position: Fly-half
Amateur team(s)
Years	Team	Apps	(Points)
–	Loughborough University		
–	Wasps Ladies		
–	Saracens Women		
International career
Years	Team	Apps	(Points)
1987–1997	England	24	
1986–1990	Great Britain	8	
Medal record
Women's rugby union
Representing England
Rugby World Cup
Gold medal – first place	1994 England	Team competition
Silver medal – second place	1991 England	Team competition

Karen Jane Almond, MBE (born 18 December 1962) is an English former rugby union player and former middle-distance athlete who captained the England women's team to victory in the 1994 Women's Rugby World Cup. She was the first England captain, male or female in the 15-a-side game, to lift a Rugby World Cup trophy.

Playing as a fly-half, she was one of the leading figures in women's rugby during the late 1980s and early 1990s and represented both England and Great Britain during the formative years of the international game.

== Early life and athletics ==
Almond was born in Kingston upon Hull to David Almond and Jean (née Mumby), who married in the city in 1960. She was educated at Crosby Primary School and Cottingham High School, and as a child played association football, including for a boys' team, before focusing on athletics.

She became a prominent member of City of Hull Athletic Club, specialising in middle-distance running and cross-country. In 1977 she won the junior women's title at the Humberside cross-country championships, successfully defending her title. Contemporary reports identified her as one of the fastest junior runners in relay competition and a strong contender for honours at the Yorkshire championships.

In 1978 she placed third in the intermediate 800 metres at the English Schools' Athletic Championships and later won the intermediate race at the Humberside championships by a considerable margin. These performances led to selection for the England cross-country team while still in her mid-teens.

== Rugby career ==
=== Beginnings and club development ===
Almond began playing rugby union in 1981 while studying at Loughborough University. She later contrasted the individual nature of athletics with the team ethos of rugby, which she found more rewarding.

After moving to London to work as a physical education teacher, including at Stormont School, she became involved in the early development of women's club rugby, helping to establish the Wasps women's team, of which she later became captain. At a time when the sport was largely amateur, players frequently organised fixtures and travel themselves, reflecting the limited support structures available.

By the mid-1980s she had developed into one of the leading fly-halves in the women's game. In April 1987 she was described as "the star of the show" in a match at Twickenham Stadium, where Wasps defeated Richmond in what was described as the first women's rugby match played at Twickenham; Almond scored a penalty and two conversions.

Wasps went on to achieve major domestic success, including a league and cup double in 1990, with Almond a central figure. She later played for Saracens, where she was part of a side that completed a domestic treble.

=== International career ===
Almond represented Great Britain between 1986 and 1990, winning eight caps. She subsequently became a key player for the England team and played for both Great Britain and England until 1990. For England she 24 caps between 1987 and 1997. She was appointed captain in 1988, and her leadership coincided with the rapid development of the women's international game.

In England's first ever women's international in 1987 she produced a standout performance against Wales, scoring two tries and a conversion and being described as a "rising new star". She went on to captain England at the 1991 Women's Rugby World Cup, where the team reached the final before losing to the United States.

Almond reached the peak of her career as captain of England at the 1994 Women's Rugby World Cup. In the final at Raeburn Place in Edinburgh, England defeated the United States 38–23. She scored 13 points in the final, including five conversions and a penalty, with her goal-kicking described as decisive. The victory was widely regarded as a landmark moment in the development of women's rugby in Eng;and.

=== Later career ===
Following the 1994 Women's Rugby World Cup, Almond travelled to New Zealand on a Saracens tour and subsequently remained there, giving up her teaching post to stay and travel. She later played her final international match for England during the team's tour of New Zealand in 1997.

== Playing style ==
Almond was regarded as a complete fly-half, combining tactical intelligence with strong running ability and reliable goal-kicking. Contemporary reports highlighted her ability to control matches and influence attacking play. She was particularly noted for her attacking instincts, exemplified by a solo try in an international against Wales in 1987 which demonstrated pace, awareness and finishing ability. Her composure and kicking accuracy were key factors in England's success at the 1994 World Cup. Her background in athletics contributed to her mobility and endurance, while her leadership qualities made her a central figure in both club and international teams.

== Honours ==
- Member of the Order of the British Empire (MBE), 2022, for services to women's rugby union
