= List of Australian women's national rugby union players =

As of 12 July 2025, 225 players have represented the Wallaroos. The "first" Wallaroo was Karla Matua, while the most recent Wallaroo is Waiaria Ellis — #225. Caitlyn Halse is the youngest-ever Australian to play test rugby, male or female, at 17 years, 242 days.

== List ==
Number	Name	Debut	Final test	Caps
1	Karla Matua	1994	1994	1
2	Bronwen McArthur (née Hart)	1994	1998	7
3	Julie Columbus	1994	1996	2
4	Angeline Shakespeare (née McGurgan)	1994	1995	2
5	Nicole Wickert	1994	2002	14
6	Deena Louise Aiken	1994	2001	3
7	Selena Tranter (née Worsley)	1994	2008	24
8	Yasmin Fay Muller (née Stafford)	1994	1994	1
9	Kerri Louise Ferris	1994	2002	13
10	Helen Taylor	1994	1997	4
11	Sharyn Williams	1994	1994	1
12	Margaret Dorothy Brennan (née Shelley)	1994	1994	1
13	Angie Richards (née Doidge)	1994	1995	2
14	Kerri Veronica Con-Goo	1994	1995	2
15	Angelina Maree Fairweather	1994	1995	2
16	Ronnie May	1994	1998	8
17	Robyn Meke (née Chambers)	1994	1994	1
18	Tina Clark (née Chapman)	1994	1994	1
19	Elizabeth Andrew	1994	2002	12
20	Bronwyn Calvert	1994	1998	9
21	Charly Beitzel	1994	1994	1
22	Vicki Lynn Botterell	1995	1996	2
23	Pearl Urima Kaleopa-Palaiali'i	1994	2002	14
24	Lisa-Jane Dwan	1995	1998	9
25	—			
26	Shirley Russell	1995	1998	5
27	—			
28	Karen Lambert	1995	1995	1
29	Carmel Anne Brennan (née Davoren)	1995	1995	1
30	Jane Hamilton	1995	1995	1
31	—			
32	Christine Victoria Henson	1996	1998	6
33	Rebecca Cleary (née Wakim)	1996	2002	12
34	Mieke Jane Fortune (née Gladwin)	1996	2002	10
35	Gail Helen Barlow (née Kerr)	1996	1996	1
36	Sharon Louise O'Kane	1996	2002	15
37	Tanya Lesley Osborne	1996	2001	10
38	Catherine Louise Boulton	1996	1996	1
39	Naomi Ragogo-Roberts	1996	2001	11
40	Vanessa Bradley (née Nooteboom)	1996	2007	8
41	Leanne Matthewson (née Wilkes)	1996	1996	1
42	Helen Greta Langley (née Theunissen)	1996	1998	8
43	Sherilee Joy Moulds	1997	1998	6
44	Bronwyn Ngaire Mackintosh	1997	2002	14
45	Karen Lea Bucholz	1997	1998	2
46	Tui Ormsby	1997	2014	24
47	Perise Ili	1997	1998	7
48	Bronwyn Laidlaw	1997	2002	10
49	Melissa Akanesi Latu	1997	2002	12
50	Holly Margaret Birch	1997	1998	4
51	Jennie Annette Williams	1997	2001	3
52	Melanie Goehr	1997	1997	2
53	Genevieve Delves	1998	2002	3
54	Kristy Frogley	1998	1998	1
55	Debbie Anne Grylls	1998	1998	1
56	Anita Carlin	1998	1998	1
57	Penelope Anderson	2001	2002	6
58	Alena Summers	2001	2001	2
59	Lisa Fiaola	2001	2007	13
60	Nyree Osieck	2001	2002	6
60	Paige Erin Butcher	2001	2006	5
61	Louise Burrows	2001	2017	22
62	Jennifer Harris (née Egan)	2001	2002	6
63	—			
64	Cheryl McAfee	2001	2010	21
65	Charmain Steventon (née Smith)	2001	2002	5
66	Davinia Kruger (née Craft)	2002	2002	3
67	Ianthe Astley-Boden	2002	2002	3
68	Jamie Blazejewski	2002	2002	4
69	Alyssa Jane Campbell	2002	2002	3
70	Alexandra Hargreaves	2002	2010	17
71	Debby Carley (née Hodgkinson)	2002	2010	9
72	Lindsay Morgan	2006	2010	14
73	Alicia Frost	2006	2007	7
74	Kate Porter	2006	2010	12
75	Kim Wilson	2006	2008	8
76	Tasileta Bethell	2006	2008	9
77	Rachelle Pirie	2006	2006	2
78	Tricia Brown	2006	2014	21
79	Rebecca Young	2006	2006	5
80	Ruan Sims	2006	2010	9
81	Tobie McGann	2006	2010	12
82	Silei Poluleuligaga	2006	2010	13
83	Se'ei Sa'u	2006	2010	10
84	Rebecca Trethowan	2006	2014	16
85	Chris Ross	2006	2010	13
86	Kelli Michelle Donnelly	2006	2006	4
87	Iliseva Batibasaga	2006	2022	27
88	Alana Thomas	2006	2008	7
89	Lito Fata	2006	2006	2
90	Annette Jean Finch (née Crawford)	2006	2006	1
91	Tegan French	2007	2007	1
92	Cassandra Rae Bailey	2007	2007	2
93	Megan Valler	2007	2007	2
94	Kylie Michelle Pennell	2007	2009	5
95	Louise Rodman (née Morrison)	2007 - 2008	3	
96	Dalena Dennison	2008	2014	9
97	Nicole Beck	2008	2010	8
98	Sharni Williams	2008		19
99	Selene Sheerin (née Thornton)	2008	2008	2
100	Danielle Meskell	2008	2016	12
101	Melissa Armstrong	2008	2008	2
102	Margaret Watson	2008	2014	13
103	Cobie-Jane Morgan	2009	2019	20
104	Kristy Giteau	2009	2010	5
105	Ashleigh Hewson	2009	2017	18
106	Rebecca Clough	2009	2019	24
107	Emerena Tarati Aviga (née Marsh)	2009	2009	1
108	Caroline Fairs	2010	2017	9
109	Shannon Parry	2010	2023	24
110	Cheyenne Campbell	2010	2017	17
111	Megan Shanahan	2010	2010	1
112	Stacey Lee Smith (née Kilmister)	2010	2010	1
113	Chloe Butler	2014	2017	14
114	Mollie Gray	2014	2017	13
115	Natasha Anderson (née Haines)	2014	2017	9
116	Alisha Sarah Hewett	2014	2019	22
117	Ashley Marsters	2014		45
118	Nita Maynard	2014	2014	7
119	Hanna Caroline Sio	2014	2016	8
120	Liz Patu	2014	2022	33
121	Brooke Saunders	2014	2014	3
122	Oneata Schwalger	2014	2014	7
123	Alexandra Sulusi	2014	2017	3
124	Kenina Latu (née Terita)	2014	2014	2
125	Michelle Milward (Note: Wallaroo number unknown)	2014	?	
126	Madeline Putz	2014	2016	3
127	Hayley Barclay	2014	2014	1
128	Angela Jane Hipwell	2014	2014	2
129	Michelle Perry	2014	2014	2
130	Ivy Kaleta	2016	2016	2
131	Nareta Marsters	2016	2017	9
132	Hana Ngaha	2016	2018	11
133	Sarah Rangimarie Riordan	2016	2018	10
134	Shontelle Stowers	2016	2016	1
135	Vesinia Schaaf-Taufa	2016	2017	4
136	Emily Robinson	2016		14
137	Katrina Aroha Barker	2016	2017	10
138	Ariana Kaiwai	2016	2016	1
139	Alanna Patison	2016	2016	2
140	Grace Hamilton	2016		21
141	Kirby Sefo	2016	2016	2
142	Chloe Teleanna Teare Leaupepe	2016	2016	1
143	Michelle Rachel Bailey	2016	2016	1
144	Evelyn Rosaleen Horomia	2017	2019	7
145	Victoria Latu	2017	2017	3
146	Fenella Hake	2017	2018	10
147	Kayla Sauvao	2017	2017	8
148	Ashleigh Dawn Timoko	2017	2017	3
149	Huia Ngawai-Swannell	2017	2017	2
150	Samantha Treherne	2017	2019	14
151	Kiri Hine-Jane Lingman	2017	2018	5
152	Hilisha Monica Mary Samoa	2017	2017	8
153	Millie Boyle	2017	2019	12
154	Violeta Atonia Pili Tupuola	2017	2017	4
155	Trilleen Pomare	2017	2025	43
156	Mahalia Murphy	2017		17
157	Kate Brown	2017	2017	2
158	Emily Chancellor	2018		34
159	Georgia O'Neill	2018	2018	2
160	Crystal Maguire	2018	2018	2
161	Atasi Lafai	2018		16
162	Mhicca Carter	2018		
163	Shanice Parker	2018	?	
164	Agnes Alice Tonumaivao	2018	2018	1
165	Darryl Wickliffe	2018	2018	2
166	Melissa Fatu	2018	?	
167	Averyl Mitchell	2019		
168	Michaela Leonard	2019		42
169	Ariana Hira-Herangi	2019		
170	Alysia Lefau-Fakaosilea	2019		
171	Asoiva Karpani	2019		41
172	Lori Cramer	2019		31
173	Georgia Cormick	2019		
174	Shannon Mato	2019		
175	Arabella McKenzie	2019		28
176	Christina Sekona	2019		
177	Alana Elisaia	2019		
178	Georgina Friedrichs	2022		38
179	Kaitlan Leaney	2022		35
180	Bridie O'Gorman	2022		37
181	Pauline Piliae-Rasabale	2022		7
182	Adiana Talakai	2022		21
183	Ivania Wong	2022		5
184	Madison Schuck	2022		5
185	Piper Duck	2022		22
186	Sera Naiqama	2022		3
187	Jemima McCalman	2022		5
188	Layne Morgan	2022		37
189	Annabelle Codey	2022		8
190	Cecilia Smith	2022		28
191	Tiarna Molloy	2022		6
192	Grace Kemp	2022		2
193	Bree-Anna Browne (née Cheatham)	2022		13
194	Siokapesi Palu	2022		23
195	Bienne Terita	2022		6
196	Maya Stewart	2022		22
197	Tania Naden	2022		27
198	Carys Dallinger	2023		1
199	Faitala Moleka	2023		26
200	Tabua Tuinakauvadra	2023		22
201	Jasmin Huriwai	2023		1
202	Leilani Nathan	2023		8
203	Brianna Hoy	2023		9
204	Desiree Miller	2023		23
205	Sarah Dougherty	2023		2
206	Melanie Wilks	2023		1
207	Samantha Wood	2024		11
208	Sally Fuesaina	2024		3
209	Hera-Barb Malcolm Heke	2024		1
210	Caitlyn Halse	2024		15
211	Biola Dawa	2024		4
212	Allana Sikimeti	2024		2
213	Natalie Wright	2024		4
214	Lydia Kavoa	2024	2025	12
215	Alapeta Ngauamo	2024	2025	5
216	Lucy Dinnen	2024		3
217	Tiarah Minns	2024		2
218	Katalina Amosa	2025		9
219	Faliki Pohiva	2025		8
220	Charlotte Caslick	2025		4
221	Ashley Fernandez	2025		6
222	Tia Hinds	2025		10
223	Martha Fua	2025		3
224	Ruby Anderson	2025		2
225	Waiaria Ellis	2025		3
