= 2008 Laurie O'Reilly Cup =

Tournament details
- Dates: 14–18 October 2008
- Countries: Australia; New Zealand
- Teams: 2

Final positions
- Champions: New Zealand

Tournament statistics
- Matches played: 2
- Tries scored: 9 (4.5 per match)
- Top scorer(s): Hannah Myers (19 points)
- Most tries: Carla Hohepa (3 tries)

The 2008 Laurie O'Reilly Cup was the seventh edition of the competition and was held between 14 and 18 October at Canberra. New Zealand retained the O'Reilly Cup after winning both matches.

It was the first time since 1998 that the Black Ferns crossed the Tasman for two rugby internationals against the Wallaroos. It was also the first women's rugby internationals played in Australia since the Wallaroos 2001 Test against England.

== Table ==
Pos	Nation	Pld	W	D	L	PF	PA	PD
1	New Zealand	2	2	0	0	59	19	+40
2	Australia	2	0	0	2	19	59	−40

== Results ==
=== 1st Test ===
14 October 2008	Australia	3–37	New Zealand	Viking Park, Canberra
14:30 AEDT (UTC+11)	Pen: Alana Thomas		Try: Olivia Coady; Carla Hohepa (2); Halie Hurring; Anna Richards; Con: Hannah Porter (3); Pen: Hannah Porter (2)	Referee: Sarah Corrigan (AUS)

LP	1	Lindsay Morgan
HK	2	Silei Poluleuligaga
TP	3	Kylie Pennell
LL	4	Dalena Dennison
RL	5	Kate Porter
BF	6	Selena Tranter
OF	7	Alexandra Hargreaves
N8	8	Debby Hodgkinson
SH	9	Cheryl Soon (c)
FH	10	Alana Thomas
LW	11	Nicole Beck
IC	12	Tui Ormsby
OC	13	Sharni Williams
RW	14	Iliseva Batibasaga
FB	15	Tricia Brown
Replacements:
	16	Margaret Watson
	17	Danielle Meskell
	18	Tasileta Bethell
	19	Se'ei Sa'u
	20	Saline Thornton
	21	Kim Wilson
	22	Melissa Rowe
Coach:
(Australia) Steve Hamson

LP	1	Stephanie Te Ohaere-Fox
HK	2	Fiao'o Fa'amausili
TP	3	Beth Mallard
LL	4	Kimberly Smith
RL	5	Victoria Heighway
BF	6	Melissa Ruscoe (c)
OF	7	Olivia Coady
N8	8	Linda Itunu
SH	9	Emma Jensen
FH	10	Anna Richards
LW	11	Carla Hohepa
IC	12	Halie Hurring
OC	13	Huriana Manuel
RW	14	Victoria Grant
FB	15	Hannah Porter
Replacements:
	16	Ruth McKay
	17	Doris Taufateau
	18	Monalisa Codling
	19	Aimee Sutorius
	20	Kendra Cocksedge
	21	Rebecca Hull
	22	Selica Winiata
Coach:
(New Zealand) Dale Atkins

=== 2nd Test ===
18 October 2008	Australia	16–22	New Zealand	Viking Park, Canberra
14:30 AEDT (UTC+11)	Try: Debby Hodgkinson; Con: Alana Thomas; Pen: Alana Thomas (3)		Try: Fiao'o Fa'amausili; Carla Hohepa; Huriana Manuel; Con: Hannah Porter (2); Pen: Hannah Porter	Referee: Roberta Barnett (AUS)

LP	1	Lindsay Morgan
HK	2	Silei Poluleuligaga
TP	3	Kylie Pennell
LL	4	Dalena Dennison
RL	5	Kim Wilson
BF	6	Selena Tranter
OF	7	Alexandra Hargreaves
N8	8	Debby Hodgkinson
SH	9	Cheryl Soon (c)
FH	10	Alana Thomas
LW	11	Nicole Beck
IC	12	Tui Ormsby
OC	13	Sharni Williams
RW	14	Iliseva Batibasaga
FB	15	Tricia Brown
Replacements:
	16	Margaret Watson
	17	Danielle Meskell
	18	Se'ei Sa'u
	19	Tasileta Bethell
	20	Saline Thornton
	21	Kate Porter
	22	Melissa Rowe
Coach:
(Australia) Steve Hamson

LP	1	Stephanie Te Ohaere-Fox
HK	2	Fiao'o Fa'amausili
TP	3	Beth Mallard
LL	4	Kimberly Smith
RL	5	Victoria Heighway
BF	6	Melissa Ruscoe (c)
OF	7	Olivia Coady
N8	8	Linda Itunu
SH	9	Emma Jensen
FH	10	Anna Richards
LW	11	Carla Hohepa
IC	12	Teresa Te Tamaki
OC	13	Huriana Manuel
RW	14	Victoria Grant
FB	15	Hannah Porter
Replacements:
	16	Ruth McKay
	17	Doris Taufateau
	18	Aimee Sutorius
	19	Shannon Willoughby
	20	Kendra Cocksedge
	21	Rebecca Hull
	22	Halie Hurring
Coach:
(New Zealand) Dale Atkins

== Squads ==
=== Australia ===
The Wallaroos named a 35–player squad for the O'Reilly Cup.

Player
Iliseva Batibasaga
Nicole Beck
Tasileta Bethell
Vanessa Bradley
Tricia Brown
Dalena Dennison
Tegan French
Alicia Frost
Alexandra Hargreaves
Faryaneh Hayati
Sarah Hind
Debby Hodgkinson
Amanda Judd
Stacey Kilmister
Danielle Meskell
Lindsay Morgan
Tui Ormsby
Kylie Pennell
Silei Poluleuligaga
Kate Porter
Chris Ross
Melissa Rowe
Saofaiga Saemo
Se'ei Sa'u
Ruan Sims
Cheryl Soon (captain)
Kate Stoney
Alana Thomas
Selene Thornton
Selena Tranter
Rebecca Trethowan
Natalie Vardanega
Margaret Watson
Kim Wilson
Sharni Williams

=== New Zealand ===
Player
Hannah Porter
Victoria Grant
Huriana Manuel
Halie Hurring
Carla Hohepa
Anna Richards
Emma Jensen
Linda Itunu
Olivia Coady
Melissa Ruscoe (captain)
Victoria Heighway
Kimberly Smith
Beth Mallard
Fiao'o Fa'amausili
Stephanie Te Ohaere-Fox
Ruth McKay
Doris Taufateau
Monalisa Codling
Aimee Sutorius
Kendra Cocksedge
Rebecca Hull
Selica Winiata
Teresa Te Tamaki
