= Warringah Rugby Club =

Australian rugby union club, based in Narrabeen, New South Wales

Warringah
- Full name: Warringah Rugby Club
- Nickname(s): The Rats, Ratties
- Founded: 1963; 63 years ago
- Location: Narrabeen, Sydney, New South Wales, Australia
- Ground(s): Pittwater Rugby Park (Capacity: 10,000)
- Coach: Josh Holmes
- Captain: Ben Marr
- League: Shute Shield
1st kit	2nd kit

Official website
- www.warringahrugby.com.au

Warringah Rugby Club is a rugby union club based in Narrabeen on the Northern Beaches of Sydney, New South Wales, Australia. The club currently competes in the New South Wales Rugby Union competitions, the Shute Shield and Tooheys New Cup. Warringah Rugby has one of the largest numbers of registered junior players in Australia.

== Club history ==
The club was formed in 1963 due to a high demand of junior rugby players searching for clubs on the northern peninsula. Being one of the most rapidly developing areas in Sydney at the time this subsequently led to the establishment in the 1962/1963 season of the Warringah Junior Rugby Union.

The Senior Club was formed to supplement the already established Warringah Junior Rugby Union and commenced playing in the Sydney second division in 1964. Its aims were to provide rugby for juniors, colts and grade players and to eventually join the 1st Division Championship competition. In 1970 the Club won the 2nd Division 1st grade Premiership and was promoted to the 1st Division for the 1971 season.

=== Honours ===
- Shute Shield 2017, 2025

== International players ==
=== Australia ===
- Hugh Pyle
- Brett Sheehan
- Mark Gerrard
- Rod Macqueen
- Dominic Vaughan
- Steve Lidbury
- Mark Bell
- Manuel Edmonds
- Lachlan MacKay
- Wycliff Palu
- Pat McCabe
- Pekahou Cowan
- Beau Robinson
- Scott Fardy
- Mark Catchpole
- Luke Reimer

=== Australia A ===
- George Websdale
- Andrew Apps
- Craig Coffey
- Ray Smith
- Josh Holmes

=== Female international players ===
- Bronnie Mackintosh
- Genevieve Delves
- Lisa Fiaola
- Jamie Blazejewski
- Cheryl Soon
- Jenny Williams
- Brownyn Calvert
- Helen Theunissen
- Chris Ross
- Alex Hargreaves
- Cobie-Jane Morgan
- Tui Ormsby

=== Other international players ===
- Gregor Townsend
- Abdel Benazzi
- Michael Lipman
- Danny Cipriani
- Enrique Rodríguez
- Francis Bindschedler
- Michael Ehrentraut
- James Cunningham
- Sailosi Tagicakibau
- Mungo Mason (Sevens)
- Mark Jackson (Duel code international)
