= List of Australian Jillaroos team players =

There have been over 150 women's rugby league footballers who have been selected to represent Australia women's national rugby league team since the nation first started playing international matches in 1995.

== Jillaroos register ==
As of 17 November 2026

The sources section below provides an explanation of the many sources used in the initial preparation of this list.
Tries and goals are incomplete for nine matches in the years 1996, 1998, 2004, 2007, and 2008. See the points section below for further details.
Match appearances are incomplete for the years 1995 to 2009, as full line-ups (of seventeen players) are currently only available for 22 of the 38 matches.

| H# | Player | Position(s) | Record | | | | Debut | | | | | | Last |
| H# | Player | Position(s) | M | T | G | P | Day | Year | Opponent | Age | Club | Ref | Last |
|---|---|---|---|---|---|---|---|---|---|---|---|---|---|
| 1 | Natalie Dwyer | HB, HK, CE, FE | **26** | 5 | 10 | 40 | 1 Jul | 1995 | NZL | 22 | Bulli Eagles | | 2013 |
| 2 | Alyssa Campbell | FB, CE, WG | ? | 5 | ? | ? | 1 Jul | 1995 | NZL | 20 | Bulli Eagles | | 1999 |
| 3 | Kellie Chessor | SR | 1 | 0 | 0 | 0 | 1 Jul | 1995 | NZL | 20 | Bulli Eagles | | 1997 |
| 4 | Renee Craft | WG | 2 | 0 | 0 | 0 | 1 Jul | 1995 | NZL | 19 | Bulli Eagles | | 1995 |
| 5 | Rommillia Emanuel | IN | 2 | 0 | 0 | 0 | 1 Jul | 1995 | NZL | – | Tuggeranong | | 1995 |
| 6 | Katrina Fanning | PR | **23** | 4 | ? | ? | 1 Jul | 1995 | NZL | – | Tuggeranong | | 2004 |
| 7 | Tarsha Gale | HB, LK | **15** | ? | ? | ? | 1 Jul | 1995 | NZL | 28 | Bulli Eagles | | 2000 |
| 8 | Mandy Ingersoll | PR | ? | ? | ? | ? | 1 Jul | 1995 | NZL | – | | | 1997 |
| 9 | Bronwyn Johnson | WG | 2 | 0 | 0 | 0 | 1 Jul | 1995 | NZL | – | Tuggeranong | | 1995 |
| 10 | Julie McGuffie | FE, LK | ? | 1 | ? | ? | 1 Jul | 1995 | NZL | 34 | Bulli Eagles | | 1996 |
| 11 | Renee McMahon | FE | 2 | 0 | 0 | 0 | 1 Jul | 1995 | NZL | – | Tuggeranong | | 1995 |
| 12 | Robyn Miller | SR | 2 | 0 | 0 | 0 | 1 Jul | 1995 | NZL | – | Tuggeranong | | 1995 |
| 13 | Katrina Moss | HK | ? | 2 | ? | ? | 1 Jul | 1995 | NZL | – | | | 1999 |
| 14 | Sherrilee Moulds | CE | 2 | 1 | 2 | 8 | 1 Jul | 1995 | NZL | 23 | Bulli Eagles | | 1995 |
| 15 | Tracey Pilon | SR | 2 | 0 | 0 | 0 | 1 Jul | 1995 | NZL | – | | | 1995 |
| 16 | Julie Porter | LK | 1 | 0 | 0 | 0 | 1 Jul | 1995 | NZL | – | Bulli Eagles | | 1995 |
| 17 | Rebecca Wisener | HK | ? | 1 | 0 | 4 | 1 Jul | 1995 | NZL | – | Woden Valley Rams | | 1997 |
| 18 | Loretta O'Neill | FB, SR | **20** | 10 | 4 | 48 | 8 Jul | 1995 | NZL | – | | | 2004 |
| 19 | Veronica White | SR | **17** | 2 | ? | ? | 8 Jul | 1995 | NZL | – | | | 2004 |
| 20 | Fiona Huntington | CE | ? | 1 | ? | ? | 21 Jul | 1996 | GBR | – | | | 1996 |
| 21 | Kasey Manning | PR* | ? | ? | ? | ? | 21 Jul | 1996 | GBR | – | | | 1996 |
| 22 | Debbie Merritt | PR | **16** | ? | ? | ? | 21 Jul | 1996 | GBR | – | | – | 2004 |
| 23 | Danielle Meskell | SR | ? | ? | ? | ? | 21 Jul | 1996 | GBR | 22 | | | 1996 |
| 24 | Sharon Patterson | IN | ? | ? | ? | ? | 21 Jul | 1996 | GBR | – | | – | 1997 |
| 25 | Steph Payne | SR* | ? | ? | ? | ? | 21 Jul | 1996 | GBR | – | | | 1997 |
| 26 | Jackie Raisin | LK | ? | 1 | ? | ? | 21 Jul | 1996 | GBR | – | | | 1998 |
| 27 | Allison Smith | WG | ? | 1 | 4 | ? | 21 Jul | 1996 | GBR | – | | | 1997 |
| 28 | Mairu Tahakaraina | PR, SR* | ? | ? | ? | ? | 21 Jul | 1996 | GBR | – | | – | 1996 |
| 29 | Jodie Billing | LK, SR | **9** | 1 | ? | ? | | 1997 | NZL | – | | | 2000 |
| 30 | Karen Brown | IN | ? | ? | ? | ? | | 1997 | NZL | – | | | 1997 |
| 31 | Kylie Egan | WG, CE | ? | 1 | ? | ? | 20 Sep | 1997 | NZL | – | | | 1999 |
| 32 | Caryl Jarrett | WG, FB, HB | ? | 4 | ? | ? | | 1997 | NZL | – | | | 2003 |
| 33 | Karen Shaw | CE | **10** | 1 | 12 | ? | 20 Sep | 1997 | NZL | – | | | 2000 |
| 34 | Karen Stuart | HK | **11** | 1 | ? | ? | | 1997 | NZL | – | | | 2000 |
| 35 | Lorraine Campbell | SR* | ? | ? | ? | ? | | 1997 | NZL | – | | – |
| 36 | Christina Moss | — | ? | 0 | 0 | 0 | | 1997 | NZL | – | South Sydney Rabbitohs | | 1997 |
| 37 | Linda Pearson | SR | ? | 0 | 0 | 0 | | 1997 | NZL | – | | | 1997 |
| 38 | Kelly Rhodes | — | ? | ? | ? | ? | | 1997 | NZL | – | | | 1997 |
| 39 | Teresa Anderson | FB, CE, WG | **23** | 9 | 0 | 36 | 19 Sep | 1998 | FIJ | 22 | | | 2008 |
| 40 | Kylie Mackay | PR | ? | ? | ? | ? | | 1998 | FIJ | – | | | 1999 |
| 41 | Karyn Murphy | HB, FE | **27** | 8 | 0 | 32 | 19 Sep | 1998 | FIJ | 28 | | | 2013 |
| 42 | Tahnee Norris | LK, SR | **33** | 6 | ? | ? | 19 Sep | 1998 | FIJ | 24 | | | 2013 |
| 43 | Nicky Richards | LK | ? | ? | ? | ? | | 1998 | FIJ | – | | | 1999 |
| 44 | Danielle Samiri | — | 2 | 2 | ? | ? | 19 Sep | 1998 | FIJ | 23 | Western Suburbs Magpies | | 1998 |
| 45 | Danielle Sproules | — | ? | ? | ? | ? | | 1998 | FIJ | – | | – | 1998 |
| 46 | Tracey Thompson | WG, CE | **16** | 3 | 19 | 50 | | 1999 | NZL | – | | | 2011 |
| 47 | Joanne Robson | HK | ? | ? | ? | ? | | 1999 | NZL | – | | | 2001 |
| 48 | Tanya Mulder | IN | **4** | 0 | 0 | 0 | 11 Nov | 2000 | NZL | – | South Brisbane Magpies | | 2000 |
| 49 | Liz Ryan | PR | 4 | 0 | 0 | 0 | 11 Nov | 2000 | NZL | – | Norths Brisbane Devils | | 2000 |
| 50 | Louise Snowling | CE | 4 | 0 | 0 | 0 | 11 Nov | 2000 | NZL | – | | | 2000 |
| 51 | Kelly O'Doherty | WG | **5** | 2 | 0 | 8 | 14 Nov | 2000 | GBR | – | South Brisbane Magpies | | 2002 |
| 52 | Nina Brocklehurst | — | 0 | 0 | 0 | 0 | | 2000 | | – | | | 2000 |
| 53 | Danielle Parker | IN | 1 | 0 | 0 | 0 | 21 Nov | 2000 | GBR | – | | | 2000 |
| 54 | Annie Banks | WG | ? | ? | ? | ? | 29 Oct | 1999 | NZL | – | | | 2003 |
| 55 | Melissa Edwards | SR, PR | **11** | ? | 1 | ? | 23 Sep | 2001 | NZL | – | | | 2004 |
| 56 | Belinder Fisher | PR | 1 | 0 | 0 | 0 | 23 Sep | 2001 | NZL | – | | | 2001 |
| 57 | Rebecca Pinn | IN | 1 | 0 | 0 | 0 | 23 Sep | 2001 | NZL | – | | | 2001 |
| 58 | Tammy Pohatu | HK, CE | ? | 1 | ? | ? | 23 Sep | 2001 | NZL | – | | | 2003 |
| 59 | Nicole Pollard | WG, CE | 3 | 0 | 0 | 0 | 23 Sep | 2001 | NZL | 21 | Gungahlin Bulls | | 2002 |
| 60 | Samantha Ramsamy | CE, WG | 4 | 1 | 0 | 4 | 23 Sep | 2001 | NZL | – | | | 2002 |
| 61 | Tina Ransfield | IN | 1 | 0 | 0 | 0 | 23 Sep | 2001 | NZL | – | | | 2001 |
| 62 | Polly Roberts | SR | 1 | 0 | 0 | 0 | 23 Sep | 2001 | NZL | – | | | 2001 |
| 63 | Tracy Bailey | FE, FB | **10** | 1 | ? | ? | 14 Jul | 2002 | GBR | – | North Aspley | | 2009 |
| 64 | Karley Banks | HB, HK | 11 | 1 | ? | ? | 14 Jul | 2002 | GBR | – | Toowoomba Fillies | | 2004 |
| 65 | Erin Elliott | WG, FE | **19** | 2 | ? | ? | 14 Jul | 2002 | GBR | – | | | 2011 |
| 66 | Neena Fraser | WG, CE, SR | **11** | 1 | ? | ? | 14 Jul | 2002 | GBR | – | | | 2008 |
| 67 | Tracey Musgrove | IN | ? | 0 | 0 | 0 | 14 Jul | 2002 | GBR | – | Toowoomba Fillies | | 2003 |
| 68 | Rebecca Tavo | CE | **8** | 6 | ? | ? | 14 Jul | 2002 | GBR | 19 | Toowoomba Fillies | | 2007 |
| 69 | Kellie Batchelor | PR | ? | 1 | 0 | 4 | 8 Aug | 2003 | NZM | – | Goodna Eagles | | 2003 |
| 70 | Lisa Elkins | HK, SR* | **3** | 0 | 0 | 0 | | 2003 | | – | Kedron Wavell | | 2003 |
| 71 | Angelica Forbes | IN | ? | 0 | 0 | 0 | | 2003 | NZM | – | Toowoomba Fillies | | 2003 |
| 72 | Patricia Fraser | IN | **4** | 0 | 0 | 0 | | 2003 | NZM | – | Toowoomba Fillies | | 2003 |
| 73 | Roslyn Simpson | WG | ? | 3 | 0 | 12 | | 2003 | NZM | – | Canberra | | 2003 |
| 74 | Steph Hancock | PR, CE, SR | **20** | 13 | 7 | 66 | | 2003 | | 21 | Toowoomba Fillies | | 2018 |
| 75 | Leah Williams | PR | ? | 4 | ? | ? | | 2003 | NZM | – | Sunshine Coast Sirens | | 2007 |
| 76 | Jaye Christiansen | SR | ? | 0 | 0 | 0 | | 2003 | | – | Kedron Wavell | | 2003 |
| 77 | Lisa Holder | FE, SR* | ? | 1 | 0 | 4 | | 2003 | | – | Brothers Ipswich | | 2003 |
| 78 | Tarah Westera | WG, LK | **14** | 7 | ? | ? | | 2003 | | – | Sunshine Coast Sirens | | 2013 |
| 79 | Bianca Ambrum | SR, CE* | ? | ? | ? | ? | 31 Oct | 2007 | NZM | 17 | Innisfail Leprechauns | | 2011 |
| 80 | Joanne Barrett | CE, PR | **9** | 2 | ? | ? | | 2007 | NZM | – | Wests Mitchelton | | 2013 |
| 81 | Jamie Blazejewski | FB* | ? | 1 | ? | ? | 31 Oct | 2007 | NZM | 29 | Forrestville Ferrets | | 2007 |
| 82 | Lisa Fiaola | CE | ? | 2 | ? | ? | 31 Oct | 2007 | NZM | 36 | Forrestville Ferrets | | 2011 |
| 83 | Suzanne Johnson | CE, WG* | ? | 1 | ? | ? | | 2007 | NZM | 22 | Cairns Ivanhoes | | 2011 |
| 84 | Natalie Levy | WG* | ? | ? | ? | ? | | 2007 | NZM | 20 | Cabramatta Two Blues | | 2007 |
| 85 | Bronwyn Mackintosh | SR* | ? | 1 | ? | ? | 31 Oct | 2007 | NZM | 37 | Forrestville Ferrets | | 2007 |
| 86 | Tooa Nanai | FB, LK, HK* | ? | ? | ? | ? | | 2007 | NZM | – | Wests Centenary | | 2007 |
| 87 | Kylie Pennell | PR | ? | ? | ? | ? | 31 Oct | 2007 | NZM | 29 | | | 2008 |
| 88 | Jennifer Pope | — | **2** | ? | ? | ? | 31 Oct | 2007 | NZM | 28 | Souths Logan Magpies | | 2007 |
| 89 | Dahlia Tahu | HB* | ? | ? | ? | ? | | 2007 | NZM | – | Canterbury Bulldogs | | 2007 |
| 90 | Amy Turner | CE* | **2** | ? | ? | ? | 31 Oct | 2007 | NZM | 23 | | | 2007 |
| 91 | Nicole Backhouse | IN | 4 | ? | ? | ? | 6 Nov | 2008 | FRA | – | Forrestville Ferrets | | 2008 |
| 92 | Teina Clark | HK | 6 | 2 | 10 | ? | 8 Nov | 2008 | RUS | 20 | East Campbelltown Eagles | | 2009 |
| 93 | Renae Kunst | SR, LK | **16** | 1 | ? | ? | 6 Nov | 2008 | FRA | 26 | Mackay Magpies | | 2017 |
| 94 | Mauloa Maafu | — | 1 | ? | ? | ? | 8 Nov | 2008 | RUS | – | | | 2008 |
| 95 | Denise McGrath | HK | 4 | ? | ? | ? | 6 Nov | 2008 | FRA | 22 | Canley Heights Dragons | | 2008 |
| 96 | Jessica Palmer | WG, CE | ? | 4 | ? | ? | 6 Nov | 2008 | FRA | – | Forrestville Ferrets | | 2013 |
| 97 | Tegan Rolfe | WG, FB | 7 | 5 | 9 | ? | 6 Nov | 2008 | FRA | – | Mackay Magpies | | 2011 |
| 98 | Amie Solomona | IN | **2** | ? | ? | ? | 8 Nov | 2008 | RUS | – | Wests Mitchelton | | 2008 |
| 99 | Deanna Turner | SR | **7** | 1 | ? | ? | 6 Nov | 2008 | FRA | – | Mackay Magpies | | 2013 |
| 100 | Ashley Alcorn | CE* | ? | 0 | 0 | 0 | | 2009 | NZL | 18 | Forrestville Ferrets | | 2009 |
| 101 | Sam Beasant | SR* | ? | 0 | 0 | 0 | | 2009 | | – | Sunshine Coast Sirens | | 2009 |
| 102 | Ali Brigginshaw | FE, HB, LK, CE | 29 | 7 | 23 | 74 | | 2009 | NZL | 19 | Souths Logan Magpies | | 2025 |
| 103 | Chloe Caldwell | SR, PR* | ? | 0 | 0 | 0 | | 2009 | | 21 | East Campbelltown Eagles | – | 2011 |
| 104 | Pio Clarke | — | ? | 0 | 0 | 0 | | 2009 | | – | East Campbelltown Eagles | | 2009 |
| 105 | Latisha Gary | FB* | ? | 0 | 0 | 0 | | 2009 | | 18 | Caboulture Snakes | | 2009 |
| 106 | Kylie Hilder | FE | ? | 1 | 0 | 4 | | 2009 | NZL | 33 | Forrestville Ferrets | | 2009 |
| 107 | Nive Moefaauo | SR* | ? | 0 | 0 | 0 | | 2009 | | 20 | Logan Brothers | | 2009 |
| 108 | Sonia Mosie | — | ? | 0 | 0 | 0 | | 2009 | | 18 | Canley Heights Dragons | | 2009 |
| 109 | Lacey Shields | HK* | ? | 0 | 0 | 0 | | 2009 | | – | Newtown Jets | | 2009 |
| 110 | Kerri Swan | — | **2** | 1 | 0 | 4 | | 2009 | | 23 | Souths Logan Magpies | | 2009 |
| 111 | Elianna Walton | PR | ? | 5 | 0 | 20 | | 2009 | | 24 | Canley Heights Dragons | | 2018 |
| 112 | Farlane Wineera | LK* | ? | 0 | 0 | 0 | | 2009 | | – | East Campbelltown Eagles | | 2009 |
| 113 | Heather Ballinger | PR | 13 | 1 | 0 | 4 | 3 Sep | 2011 | SAM | 29 | Cairns Kangaroos | | 2018 |
| 114 | Tui Cope | WG* | 1 | 1 | 0 | 4 | 3 Sep | 2011 | SAM | – | Browns Plains Bears | | 2011 |
| 115 | Alexandra Sulusi | SR, PR | 5 | 0 | 0 | 0 | 3 Sep | 2011 | SAM | 17 | Canley Heights Dragons | | 2014 |
| 116 | Julie Young | HK | 6 | 0 | 0 | 0 | 3 Sep | 2011 | SAM | – | Redfern All Blacks | | 2014 |
| 117 | Rebecca Young | PR | 8 | 0 | 0 | 0 | 3 Sep | 2011 | SAM | 29 | Redfern All Blacks | | 2017 |
| 118 | Karina Brown | WG, FB | 11 | 8 | 0 | 32 | 5 Jul | 2013 | ENG | 24 | Burleigh Bears | | 2018 |
| 119 | Sam Bremner | FB | 10 | 14 | 0 | 56 | 5 Jul | 2013 | ENG | 21 | Helensburgh Tigers | | 2022 |
| 120 | Jenni-Sue Hoepper | CE, FE, HB | 6 | 5 | 2 | 24 | 5 Jul | 2013 | ENG | – | Springfield Panthers | | 2015 |
| 121 | Ruan Sims | PR, LK | 11 | 2 | 0 | 8 | 5 Jul | 2013 | ENG | 31 | Cronulla-Caringbah Sharks | | 2017 |
| 122 | Emma Tonegato | WG, FB | 0 | 0 | 0 | 0 | 8 Jul | 2013 | FRA | 18 | Helensburgh Tigers | | 2023 |
| 123 | Emily Andrews | CE* | 1 | 0 | 0 | 0 | 11 Jul | 2013 | NZL | 21 | Helensburgh Tigers | | 2013 |
| 124 | Tegan Chandler | WG | 1 | 0 | 0 | 0 | 11 Jul | 2013 | NZL | 21 | Helensburgh Tigers | | 2013 |
| 125 | Emma-Marie Young | IN | 2 | 0 | 0 | 0 | 11 Jul | 2013 | NZL | – | Maitland Pickers | | 2016 |
| 126 | Kezie Apps | SR, PR | 26 | 4 | 0 | 16 | 9 Nov | 2014 | NZL | 23 | Helensburgh Tigers | | 2026 |
| 127 | Annette Brander | CE, SR | 10 | 0 | 0 | 0 | 9 Nov | 2014 | NZL | 21 | Beerwah Bulldogs | | 2019 |
| 128 | Brittany Breayley | HK | 10 | 1 | 0 | 4 | 9 Nov | 2014 | NZL | 23 | Ipswich Norths | | 2018 |
| 129 | Vanessa Foliaki | SR, LK | 6 | 4 | 0 | 16 | 9 Nov | 2014 | NZL | 21 | Canley Heights Dragons | | 2017 |
| 130 | Maddie Studdon | HB | 6 | 1 | 13 | 30 | 9 Nov | 2014 | NZL | 20 | Helensburgh Tigers | | 2017 |
| 131 | Simaima Taufa | LK, PR, WG | 22 | 0 | 0 | 0 | 9 Nov | 2014 | NZL | 20 | Canley Heights Dragons | | 2026 |
| 132 | Latoya Billy | WG | 1 | 0 | 0 | 0 | 3 May | 2015 | NZL | – | | | 2015 |
| 133 | Tallisha Harden | PR | 4 | 3 | 0 | 12 | 3 May | 2015 | NZL | 22 | Burleigh Bears | | 2022 |
| 134 | Casey Karklis | IN | 2 | 0 | 0 | 0 | 3 May | 2015 | NZL | 18 | Souths Logan Magpies | | 2016 |
| 135 | Mahalia Murphy | CE | 3 | 3 | 0 | 12 | 3 May | 2015 | NZL | 21 | Redfern All Blacks | | 2024 |
| 136 | Chelsea Baker | WG, FB | 6 | 3 | 5 | 22 | 6 May | 2016 | NZL | 30 | Wallabies Gladstone | | 2018 |
| 137 | Elizabeth Cook-Black | IN | 1 | 0 | 0 | 0 | 6 May | 2016 | NZL | – | Souths Logan Magpies | | 2016 |
| 138 | Allana Ferguson | FE | 1 | 0 | 0 | 0 | 6 May | 2016 | NZL | 22 | Cronulla-Caringbah Sharks | | 2016 |
| 139 | Corban McGregor | CE, FB | 0 | 0 | 0 | 0 | 6 May | 2016 | NZL | 22 | Cronulla-Caringbah Sharks | | 0 |
| 140 | Caitlin Moran | HB, CE | 6 | 4 | 17 | 51 | 6 May | 2016 | NZL | 19 | Hunter Stars | | 2017 |
| 141 | Isabelle Kelly | CE, FB | 25 | 21 | 0 | 84 | 5 May | 2017 | NZL | 20 | North Newcastle | | 2026 |
| 142 | Simone Smith | HB | 1 | 0 | 0 | 0 | 5 May | 2017 | NZL | 24 | | – | 2017 |
| 143 | Zahara Temara | CE, FE, HB, LK | 5 | 4 | 0 | 16 | 5 May | 2017 | NZL | 19 | Burleigh Bears | – | 2018 |
| 144 | Nakia Davis-Welsh | FB | 4 | 3 | 0 | 12 | 16 Nov | 2017 | COK | 21 | Redfern All Blacks | | 2017 |
| 145 | Lavina O'Mealey | PR | 4 | 1 | 0 | 4 | 16 Nov | 2017 | COK | 33 | Redfern All Blacks | | 2017 |
| 146 | Talesha Quinn | SR | 0 | 0 | 0 | 0 | 16 Nov | 2017 | COK | 28 | Cronulla-Caringbah Sharks | | 0 |
| 147 | Meg Ward | WG, CE | 3 | 3 | 0 | 12 | 16 Nov | 2017 | COK | 23 | Club in Northern Territory | | 2017 |
| 148 | Julia Robinson | WG | 15 | 24 | 0 | 96 | 13 Oct | 2018 | NZL | 20 | Brisbane Broncos | | 2026 |
| 149 | Hannah Southwell | CE, LK | 2 | 0 | 0 | 0 | 13 Oct | 2018 | NZL | 19 | St George Illawarra Dragons | | 2019 |
| 150 | Holli Wheeler | PR | 5 | 0 | 4 | 8 | 13 Oct | 2018 | NZL | 28 | St George Illawarra Dragons | | 2022 |
| 151 | Keeley Nizza | HK | 13 | 3 | 0 | 12 | 13 Oct | 2018 | NZL | 18 | St George Illawarra Dragons | | 2026 |
| 152 | Tazmin Gray | SR | 0 | 0 | 0 | 0 | 13 Oct | 2018 | NZL | 23 | Sydney Roosters | | 0 |
| 153 | Millie Boyle | PR | 8 | 0 | 0 | 0 | 25 Oct | 2019 | NZL | 22 | Brisbane Broncos | | 2026 |
| 154 | Kirra Dibb | FE | 1 | 0 | 0 | 0 | 25 Oct | 2019 | NZL | 22 | Sydney Roosters | | 2019 |
| 155 | Tiana Penitani Gray | CE, FE, WG, SR | 12 | 5 | 0 | 20 | 25 Oct | 2019 | NZL | 23 | St George Illawarra Dragons | | 2026 |
| 156 | Jessica Sergis | CE | 18 | 23 | 0 | 92 | 25 Oct | 2019 | NZL | 22 | St George Illawarra Dragons | | 2026 |
| 157 | Shakiah Tungai | WG | 1 | 1 | 4 | 12 | 25 Oct | 2019 | NZL | 22 | St George Illawarra Dragons | | 2019 |
| 158 | Chelsea Lenarduzzi | IN | 1 | 0 | 0 | 0 | 25 Oct | 2019 | NZL | 23 | Brisbane Broncos | | 2019 |
| 159 | Botille Vette-Welsh | IN | 1 | 0 | 0 | 0 | 25 Oct | 2019 | NZL | 23 | St George Illawarra Dragons | | 2019 |
| 160 | Tarryn Aiken | FE, HB | 15 | 7 | 23 | 74 | 2 Nov | 2022 | COK | 23 | Brisbane Broncos | | 2026 |
| 161 | Lauren Brown | HK, HB | 7 | 0 | 31 | 62 | 2 Nov | 2022 | COK | 27 | Gold Coast Titans | | 2023 |
| 162 | Shenae Ciesiolka | WG, CE | 3 | 4 | 0 | 16 | 2 Nov | 2022 | COK | 25 | Brisbane Broncos | | 2022 |
| 163 | Caitlan Johnston | PR | 4 | 2 | 0 | 8 | 2 Nov | 2022 | COK | 21 | Newcastle Knights | | 2023 |
| 164 | Olivia Kernick | SR, PR | 15 | 7 | 0 | 28 | 2 Nov | 2022 | COK | 21 | Sydney Roosters | | 2026 |
| 165 | Shannon Mato | PR | 9 | 1 | 0 | 4 | 2 Nov | 2022 | COK | 24 | Gold Coast Titans | | 2025 |
| 166 | Evania Pelite | WG | 4 | 7 | 0 | 28 | 2 Nov | 2022 | COK | 27 | Gold Coast Titans | | 2022 |
| 167 | Kennedy Cherrington | PR | 6 | 2 | 0 | 8 | 2 Nov | 2022 | COK | 23 | Parramatta Eels | | 2023 |
| 168 | Yasmin Meakes | SR | 13 | 1 | 0 | 4 | 2 Nov | 2022 | COK | 28 | Newcastle Knights | | 2025 |
| 169 | Taliah Fuimaono | FE | 3 | 1 | 0 | 4 | 2 Nov | 2022 | COK | 23 | St George Illawarra Dragons | | 2022 |
| 170 | Shaylee Bent | SR | 8 | 4 | 0 | 16 | 6 Nov | 2022 | FRA | 22 | St George Illawarra Dragons | | 2026 |
| 171 | Jaime Chapman | WG, CE | 10 | 18 | 0 | 72 | 6 Nov | 2022 | FRA | 20 | Brisbane Broncos | | 2026 |
| 172 | Keilee Joseph | LK | 13 | 5 | 0 | 20 | 6 Nov | 2022 | FRA | 20 | Sydney Roosters | | 2026 |
| 173 | Jessika Elliston | PR | 5 | 0 | 0 | 0 | 14 Oct | 2023 | NZL | 25 | Gold Coast Titans | | 2025 |
| 174 | Tamika Upton | FB | 13 | 18 | 0 | 72 | 14 Oct | 2023 | NZL | 26 | Newcastle Knights | | 2026 |
| 175 | Jakiya Whitfeld | WG | 7 | 7 | 0 | 28 | 28 Oct | 2023 | NZL | 22 | Wests Tigers | | 2025 |
| 176 | Emma Manzelmann | IN | 1 | 0 | 0 | 0 | 28 Oct | 2023 | NZL | 21 | North Queensland Cowboys | | 2023 |
| 177 | Quincy Dodd | HK | 7 | 2 | 0 | 8 | 18 Oct | 2024 | PNG | 24 | Cronulla-Sutherland Sharks | | 2026 |
| 178 | Olivia Higgins | HK | 9 | 0 | 0 | 0 | 18 Oct | 2024 | PNG | 32 | Newcastle Knights | | 2026 |
| 179 | Sarah Togatuki | IN | 7 | 0 | 0 | 0 | 18 Oct | 2024 | PNG | 26 | Wests Tigers | | 2026 |
| 180 | Rima Butler | PR | 3 | 0 | 0 | 0 | 26 Oct | 2025 | SAM | 27 | Sydney Roosters | | 2025 |
| 181 | Jesse Southwell | HB | 5 | 1 | 40 | 84 | 26 Oct | 2025 | SAM | 20 | Newcastle Knights | | 2026 |
| 182 | Ellie Johnston | PR | 6 | 1 | 0 | 4 | 26 Oct | 2025 | SAM | 25 | Cronulla-Sutherland Sharks | | 2026 |
| 183 | Abbi Church | FB | 5 | 9 | 0 | 36 | 2 Nov | 2025 | NZL | 27 | Parramatta Eels | | 2026 |
| 184 | Jocelyn Kelleher | FE | 3 | 2 | 18 | 44 | 16 Oct | 2026 | SAM | 26 | Sydney Roosters | | 2026 |
| 185 | Sariah Paki | SR | 4 | 1 | 0 | 4 | 24 Oct | 2026 | ENG | 25 | Sydney Roosters | | 2026 |
| 186 | Makenzie Weale | PR | 2 | 1 | 0 | 4 | 24 Oct | 2026 | ENG | 24 | North Queensland Cowboys | | 2026 |
| 187 | Sheridan Gallagher | WG | 1 | 0 | 0 | 0 | 1 Nov | 2026 | WAL | 24 | Canberra Raiders | | 2026 |

=== Notes ===
==== Positions ====
- Where a player has played in more than one position, the most common is listed first.
- The following abbreviations are used
  - FB = Fullback
  - WG = Wing
  - CE = Centre
  - FE = Five-eighth
  - HB = Halfback
  - PR = Prop
  - SR = Second-row
  - LK = Lock
  - IN = interchange
- Interchange (IN) is listed only when a player's appearances have all been off the interchange bench.
- An asterisk indicates position(s) played in other representative matches where the player's position for the Jillaroos is unknown.

==== Matches ====
- Numbers in **bold** in the matches (M) column are drawn from the Most Appearances section of a Jillaroos history article that the NRL published in January 2021. There is some inconsistency in tallies given in NRL articles.
  - For Katrina Fanning, the initial list has 23 matches, whilst a 2024 article announcing her induction into the NRL Hall of Fame has 24 matches.
  - For Tahnee Norris the initial list has 33 matches, whilst a 2024 article announcing her induction into the NRL Hall of Fame has 32 matches.
- The match tally for Tarsha Gale is drawn from an article announcing her induction into the NRL Hall of Fame.
- Numbers in **bold italics** in the matches column are drawn from a Souths Logan Magpies Honours Board. This list includes players that joined the Magpies both before and after making their Jillaroos debut.

==== Points ====
- The tally of individual tries and goals is missing detail from nine matches.
  - 1996 vs Great Britain (Second Test), all 12 points unknown
  - 1998 vs Fiji (First Test), there are three contradictory reports.
    - A syndicated report gives a score of 68 to nil and states the Tahnee Norris scored two tries and Loretta O’Neill three tries. The report also mentions that Tarsha Gale was captain, and that Karen Shaw suffered a wrist injury during the match.
    - A match report in the Fiji Times gives a score of 72 to nil and lists try and point scorers in the first half and try scorers (only) in the second half. Combining the halves tallies to 14 tries and 3 goals for 62 points. Try scorers were listed as Murphy 3, Campbell 2, O’Neill 2, Anderson, Billing, Dwyer, White, Gale, Moss, and Merritt. The report is accompanied by three match photos.
    - A match report in Fiji's Daily Post gives a score of 68 to nil. This report states that thirteen tries were scored, five in the first half and eight in the second half. All five tries in the first stanza were converted for a half-time score of 30 to nil. Ten of the thirteen tries are credited in this **Post** report: Veronica White 3, prop Karen Shaw 2 and one try each to Danielle Samiri, Kylie Mackay, Katrina Moss, Alyssa Campbell and Kylie Egan.
    - The table reflects the syndicated report, but only on the basis that it was the first account to be "found".
    - Karen Shaw was ruled of one of the two Tests with concussion after a crossbar fell on her shortly after the completion of a fitness test. The recollection of at least one player was that this incident occurred before the First Test.
  - 1999 vs New Zealand (First Test), all 10 points unknown.
  - 1999 vs New Zealand (Second Test), only 18 of 22 points known. A video of the last 70 minutes of the match posted on YouTube misses the first Australian try. The video shows, with commentary three tries, by Karyn Murphy, Veronica White and Natalie Dwyer. The commentators mention that Karen Shaw kicked three goals.
  - 2004 vs New Zealand (First Test), all 12 points unknown.
  - 2007 vs New Zealand Māori (First Test), only 8 of 20 points known. A Manly Daily profile on three local players who made the tour reported that Jamie Blazejewski and Bronwyn Mackintosh scored tries and that Lisa Faiola was recognised as the back of the game.
  - 2007 vs New Zealand Māori (Second Test), all 4 points unknown.
  - 2008 vs France (World Cup), only 36 of 60 points known. A Sunshine Coast Daily match report states that 12 tries were scored and names six scorers of nine of the tries. This included four tries by Steph Hancock and three by Teresa Anderson.
  - 2008 vs Russia (World Cup), only 20 of 72 points known. Two regional newspapers report on performances in this match of players associated with their distribution area. The reports credit three tries to Tegan Rolfe and two tries to Steph Hancock.
- Numbers shaded in the tries (T) and goals (G) columns are a tally from available sources during this (1996 to 2008) period of incompleteness. The following two examples show the impact of the nine incomplete scoresheets.
  - Alyssa Campbell scored two tries in the Third Test of 1996, two tries in the Second Test of 1998, and one in the Third Test of 1999. A total of five, as shown in the table. However, Australia’s scorers in 1996’s Second Test are unknown and Campbell likely played in that match. Also, the Fiji Times match report of 1998’s First Test has Campbell scoring two tries, but per the above point that account differs from the syndicated report.
  - Erin Elliott scored a try against New Zealand Māori in the 2003 World Cup, and another try against the same opponent on the 2009 tour of New Zealand. A total of two, as shown. However, Elliott likely played in the First Test of 2004 and from photos and brief reports in the Sunshine Coast Daily is confirmed as playing in the 2008 World Cup matches against France and Russia.
- Drop goal / field goal column excluded as, to date, just one known field goal has been kicked. This was by Caitlin Moran in the 2017 World Cup Final.

==== Debut ====
- The club listed is the club with whom the individual was playing, or had most recently played, at the time of making her debut.

== 1993 Foundation team ==
In early October 1993, two women's teams from Australian clubs travelled to Suva, Fiji. On Friday, 1 October the two teams, Waverton Eagles, from Sydney, and Woden Valley Rams, from Canberra, played a match as a curtain raiser to a men's game between Fiji and a Queensland Residents team. A team of Australians was then selected from the two clubs, to play a team of Fijian women on Tuesday, 5 October 1993. Played in torrential rain, the Australian team defeated the Fijian team, 16, to 4.

In 2019, the National Rugby League announced that the players in this 1993 match had been credited as members of the Foundation team.

- F1 – Cath Welch
- F2 – Maree Bush
- F3 – Leanne Cosgrove
- F4 – Alison Cox
- F5 – Rebecca Goolagong
- F6 – Fiona Huntington
- F7 – Cathy Karalus
- F8 – Jeanette Luker
- F9 – Stephanie Martin
- F10 – Karen McQualter
- F11 – Robyn Miller
- F12 – Debra Musgrove
- F13 – Kini Nateibu
- F14 – Selai Racumu
- F15 – Allison Smith
- F16 – Luse Vula
- F17 – Kylie Walker

From this group, Robyn Miller (1995), Fiona Huntington (1996), and Allison Smith (1996–97) subsequently played for Australia. Jeanette Luker managed several Australian teams. Three members of the group: Kini Nateibu, Selai Racumu, and Luse Vuci had Fijian connections.

== Sources ==
=== Direct Online ===
- 1995 series preview, listing Canberra based players.
- 1995 history articles.
- 1996 match video on YouTube. Replay of the First Test. Highlights of the Third Test.
- 1999 Second Test video, last 70 minutes.
- 2000 World Cup Game 5 match report, including a team list for Australia’s fourth match. Posted on social media.
- 2002 First Test match report, including team lists. Posted on social media.
- 2007 squad.
- 2008 World Cup squad, with State team.
- 2009 squad.
- 2011 squad.
- 2011 Test match report.
- 2013 World Cup squad.
- 2013 World Cup squad profiles on social media.
- 2014 squad.
- 2015 preliminary squad, with place of residence. Player profiles in preview pieces.
- 2016 squad. Players’ 2016 clubs are given in the team lists for the subsequent interstate match.
- 2017 Anzac Test squads. An initial, extended squad of 25. A trimmed squad of 20.
- 2017 World Cup squad, with clubs.
- 2018 squad, with NRLW clubs.
- 2019 squad, with NRLW clubs.
- 2022 squad for postponed 2021 World Cup, with NRLW clubs.
- 2023 squad, with NRLW clubs. Three additional players called into the squad.
- 2024 squad, with NRLW clubs. Two additional players called into the squad.

=== Indirect Online ===
The following articles are accessible via eResources such as NewsBank and ProQuest. One means of accessing eResources is through participating libraries. For example, the State Library of New South Wales provides free access to eResources for residents of New South Wales who are library members.

- 1996 First Test preview.
- 1996 First Test match report.
- 1997 series preview, listing Illawarra based players.
- 1997 series preview, listing 26 Australian players.
- 1997 First Test scoresheet.
- 1997 First Test match reports in New Zealand newspapers.
- 1997 Second Test scoresheet.
- 1998 Second Test scoresheet.
- 2001 Player profile.
- 2001 Test match report.
- 2007 pre tour articles in provincial or suburban newspapers.
- 2007 post tour articles in provincial or suburban newspapers.
- 2008 World Cup Jillaroos’ Game 1 match report, naming six Australian players. Two other regional newspapers reported on the participation of “their” local players in this match, bring the confirmed tally to nine.
- 2008 World Cup, Jillaroos’ Game 3 match report, with scoresheet. With accompanying photos, seven players are named. A further two players are confirmed from photos of this match posted on the NRL website.
- 2008 World Cup, Jillaroos’ Game 3 match report, with scoresheet. With accompanying photos, seven players are named.
- 2008 World Cup, regional newspaper articles on cup performances of players associated with their distribution area.
- 2009 pre tour articles in provincial or suburban newspapers.
- 2011 pre tour articles in provincial or suburban newspapers.

=== Offline ===
- 1995 New Zealand Rugby League Annual.
- 1997 New Zealand Rugby League Annual. A list of 17 players for each team is listed, but just once. It is not explicitly stated whether the same 34 footballers played in both Test Matches,
- 1998 First Test match report in the Fiji Times.
- 1998 Second Test match report in the Fiji Times.
- 1999 New Zealand Rugby League Annual.
- 2000 World Cup programme.
- 2000 World Cup Game 3 match report, including a team list for Australia’s second match.
- 2000 World Cup Game 4 match report, including a team list for Australia’s third match.
- 2000 New Zealand Rugby League Annual.
- 2001 New Zealand Rugby League Annual, which lists point scorers for both sides in the one-off Test match. The article, however, lists only the New Zealand team.
- 2002 Second Test match report, including team lists.
- 2002 Third Test match report, including team lists.
- 2003 August Test pre-match team lists.
- 2003 August Test match report.
- 2003 World Cup programme.
- 2003 New Zealand Rugby League Alamanack [sic], which list point scorers for every World Cup match but not team lists.
- 2008 World Cup programme, with jersey numbers and clubs.

== Summary of confirmed player appearances by match ==
The table below summaries the number of confirmed appearances by each match.

The upper row in each band displays the flag of the opponent and the number of confirmed appearances. A link to an appropriate source is given, with a letter indicating the type of source. See the key below for details. Green shading indicates the full team is confirmed for that match. Yellow shading indicates the team for that match is partially confirmed. Red shading indicates no players are confirmed for that match.

The lower row in each band displays the year and series, and the number of players in the squad. A link to an appropriate source is given, with a letter indicating the type of source.

Australian Jillaroos - Number of confirmed player appearances by match, with primary source noted
| Matches | 0 | 1 | 2 | 3 | 4 | 5 | 6 | 7 | 8 | 9 |
|---|---|---|---|---|---|---|---|---|---|---|
| 0 — 9 | — | 17 A | 17 A | 17 V | 1 | 17 H | 17; S N | 5 S | 13 N | 10 S |
| 0 — 9 | — | 1995 (20) Q | | 1996 (18+) | | | 1997 (17) A to (26) N | | 1998 (18) Q | |
| 10 — 19 | 17 | 17 V | 17 A | 17 V | 17 L | 17 L | 17 L | 17 N,S | 17 L | 17 L |
| 10 — 19 | 1999 (20+) V+A | | | 2000 World Cup (21) P | | | | 2001 (17) N | 2002 (21) | |
| 20 — 29 | 17 L | 5 S | 5 S | 8 S | 2 S | 7 S | 1 S | 3 N | 17 V | 5 N |
| 20 — 29 | 2002 | 2003 (17) P | 2003 World Cup (24) P | | | | | 2004 (17+) V | | 2007 (20); W |
| 30 — 39 | 3 N | 17 N | 17 N | 17 N | PAC 17 N | 17 V | 4 N | 6 N | 17 | 17 E |
| 30 — 39 | 2007 | 2008 World Cup (22) P | | | | | 2009 (24) W N | | 2011 (20) W | 2013 WC |
| 40 — 49 | 17 E | 17 V | 17 V | 17 V | 17 M | 17 M | 17 M | 17 M | 17 M | 17 M |
| 40 — 49 | 2013 WC (24) W | | | 2014 (18); W | 2015 (21); W | 2016 (18); W | 2017 (25); W | 2017 WC (24) W | | |
| 50 — 59 | 17 M | 17 M | 17 M | 17 M | 17 M | 17 M | 17 M | 17 M | 17 M | 17 M |
| 50 — 59 | 2017 WC | | 2018 (19) W | 2019 (19) W | 2022 (2021 WC) (24) W | | | | | 2023 (24) W |
| 60 — 69 | 17 M | 17 M | 17 M | 17 M | 17 M | 17 M | 17 M | 17 M | 17 M | 17 M |
| 60 — 69 | 2023 | 2024 (23) W | | | 2025 W | | | | 2026 World Cup (24) | |
| 70 — 72 | 17 M | 17 M | 17 M | — | | | | | | |
| 70 — 72 | 2026 World Cup | | | — | | | | | | |

=== Key ===
- A - Annual (NZRL)
- E - European Rugby League report
- H - Highlights (video)
- L - League Express match report
- M - Match centre (NRL)
- N - Newspaper article
- P - Programme
- Q - Squad photo
- R - Report
- S - Scoresheet
- T - Try scorers
- V - Video replay
- W - Web article

== See also ==
- Women's rugby league in Australia
- Australia women's national rugby league team
- List of Australia national rugby league team players
