= 2003 Women's Rugby League World Cup squads =

This article lists the squads for the 2003 Women's Rugby League World Cup.

The lists are primarily composed from two sources. The Lion Foundation Woman's Rugby League World Cup 2003 programme, published to coincide with the start of the tournament, lists players' names, their playing positions and club. The New Zealand Rugby League Almanack 2003 listed the scorers for all 25 matches in the tournament.

== Australia ==
Australia played five matches in the tournament: New Zealand Māori, Niue, New Zealand, Samoa and New Zealand Māori (Semi-Final). This list includes the players named in the programme and affirmed as try scorers in the New Zealand Rugby League Almanack plus those named as making their debut in 2003.

Player	Position(s)	Club	State	T	G	Pts
Teresa Anderson	Second-row, Loose forward, Halfback	Toowoomba	Qld	2	0	8
Annie Banks	Hooker, Centre, Wing	Kedron-Wavell Wildcats	Qld	0	0	0
Karley Banks	Halfback	Brothers Ipswich	Qld	1	0	4
Kellie Batchelor	Prop, Second-row	Goodna	Qld	1	0	4
Jaye Christensen	Loose forward, Halfback, Stand-off	Kedron-Wavell Wildcats	Qld	0	0	0
Melissa Edwards	Prop, Second-row, Halfback	Toowoomba	Qld	0	0	0
Lisa Elkins	Second-row	Kedron-Wavell Wildcats	Qld	0	0	0
Erin Elliott	Centre, Wing, Fullback	Toowoomba	Qld	1	0	4
Katrina Fanning	Prop	Boomanulla	ACT	1	0	4
Angelica Forbes	Second-row, Centre, Wing	Toowoomba	Qld	0	0	0
Neena Fraser	Prop, Second-row	Toowoomba	Qld	1	0	4
Patricia Fraser	Prop	Toowoomba	Qld	0	0	0
Stephanie Hancock	Second-row	Toowoomba	Qld	0	0	0
Lisa Holder	Second-row, Loose forward, Halfback	Brothers Ipswich	Qld	1	0	4
Caryl Jarrett	Halfback, Centre, Fullback	Canberra	ACT	2	0	8
Karyn Murphy	Halfback, Stand-off	Brothers Ipswich	Qld	1	0	4
Tracey Musgrove	Second-row, Halfback	Toowoomba	Qld	0	0	0
Tahnee Norris	Second-row, Loose forward	Brothers Ipswich	Qld	2	0	8
Tammy Pohatu	Hooker	Brothers Ipswich	Qld	0	0	0
Roslyn Simpson	Centre, Wing	Canberra	ACT	3	0	12
Rebecca Tavo	Second-row, Centre, Wing	Toowoomba	Qld	4	0	16
Tracey Thompson	Centre, Wing	Brothers Ipswich	Qld	2	19	46
Tarah Westera	Centre, Wing	Sunshiine Coast	Qld	3	0	12
Leah Williams	Prop	Sunshiine Coast	Qld	4	0	16
Totals				29	19	154

Coaching and support staff:

- Coach: Dave Leat
- Assistant Coach: Graham Christie
- Manager: Jeanette Luker
- Trainer: Jacob Christie

== Cook Islands ==
The Cook Islands played six matches: New Zealand, Tokelau, Great Britain, New Zealand Māori, Tokelau and Samoa. The first match, against New Zealand, was their international debut. Players in the Cook Islands team were selected from New Zealand clubs.

Player	Position(s)	Club	Province	T	G	Pts
Charmaine Angareu	Second-row, Loose forward, Centre	Mangere East	Auckland	0	0	0
Deborah Apaina	Prop, Second-row	Ponsonby	Auckland	0	0	0
Marry-Anne Aukino	Wing, Fullback, Centre	Papakura	Auckland	0	0	0
Rangi Aukino	Hooker, Second-row	Randwick	Wellington	0	0	0
Justine Cook	Second-row, Prop	Ponsonby	Auckland	0	0	0
Sarah Cook	Second-row, Prop	Ponsonby	Auckland	0	0	0
Debbie Dorman	Prop	Ponsonby	Auckland	1	0	4
Michelle Driscoll	Centre	Richmond	Auckland	0	0	0
Tracey Larkin	Second-row, Centre	Ponsonby	Auckland	1	0	4
Elizabeth Mani	Stand-off, Second-row	Mt Wellington	Auckland	1	0	4
Caroline Marsters	Stand-off, Centre, Fullback	Mt Wellington	Auckland	3	2	16
Kelly Marsters	Wing, Fullback	Te Atatu	Auckland	0	0	0
Joyce Otikore-Joseph	Halfback, Hooker	Otara	Auckland	0	0	0
Nora Pange	Second-row, Prop	Mangere East	Auckland	0	0	0
Api Parai	Hooker, Second-row, Halfback	Te Atatu	Auckland	3	4	20
Hilda Peters	Halfback, Hooker	Papakura	Auckland	0	0	0
Karen Thorn	Second-row, Loose forward	Ponsonby	Auckland	0	0	0
Amiria Tikinau	Hooker, Loose forward	Otahuhu	Auckland	2	0	8
Mary Tuarae	Halfback, Hooker, Loose forward	Richmond	Auckland	2	0	8
Tutai-Stephanie Utanga	Wing, Fullback	Mt Wellington	Auckland	1	1	6
Theresa Vaiula	Wing, Fullback	Ponsonby	Auckland	0	0	0
Teremoana Vano	Second-row, Loose forward	Ponsonby	Auckland	1	0	4
Teresa Wilson	Centre	Hillcrest	Waikato	0	0	0
Tupou Wilson	Halfback, Stand-off	Hillcrest	Waikato	0	0	0
Totals				15	7	74

Coaching and support staff:

- Coach: Tom Bishop
- Assistant Coach: Karlvon (Kas) Vasau
- Manager: Rita Ngaiti
- Trainer: Joe Hewitt

== Great Britain ==
Great Britain played five matches: Samoa. Tonga, New Zealand Māori, Cook Islands and New Zealand (semi-final).

Player	Position(s)	Club	M	T	G	Pts
Lindsay Anfield	Wing, Fullback	Barrow	4	1	0	4
Samantha Bailey	Prop, Second-row	Bradford Thunderbirds	4	0	0	0
Jane Banks	Prop, Second-row	Bradford Thunderbirds	3	0	0	0
Nicola Benstead	Wing	Hull Dockers	1	0	0	0
Aimee Bradshaw	Second-row	Bank Quay Broncos	3	0	0	0
Samantha Brook	Prop, Second-row	Bradford Thunderbirds	3	0	0	0
Wendy Charnley	Halfback, Hooker	Bank Quay Broncos	3	0	0	0
Sarah Dixon	Wing	Pendle Panthers	2	0	0	0
Brenda Dobek	Stand-off	Wakefield Townville Panthers	4	0	6	12
Andrea Dobson	Prop, Second-row	Pendle Panthers	3	0	0	0
Stacey Doherty	Wing, Fullback	Wakefield Townville Panthers	4	1	0	4
Caroline Dolan	Prop	Halifax	1	0	0	0
Stacey Greenwood	Stand-off, Loose forward	Bradford Thunderbirds	5	6	0	24
Renee Gregorie	Second-row, Centre	Bradford Thunderbirds	5	1	0	4
Rebecca Jones	Halfback, Hooker	Toowoomba	3	2	0	8
Bevlee Langan	Prop	York Acorn Ladies	2	0	0	0
Sally Milburn	Centre	Barrow	5	3	0	12
Nicola Parry	Centre	York Acorn Ladies	2	0	0	0
Natalie Parsons	Halfback	Bradford Thunderbirds	5	3	7	26
Sarah Shillito	Second-row, Centre	Keighley Albion Cats	2	0	0	0
Nicola Simpson	Centre, Fullback	Milford Marlins	5	3	0	12
Beth Sutcliffe	Loose forward	Hillside Hawks	4	0	0	0
Dannielle Titterington	Hooker	Wakefield Townville Panthers	4	0	0	0
Rachel Twibill	Wing	Halifax	3	0	0	0
Michelle Wood	Prop	Slaithwait	3	1	0	4
Totals			83	21	13	110

Notes:

- There are two sources that provide different scorers for the Great Britain versus Tonga game.
  - The match report in the League Express has Nicola Simpson scoring three tries, and Dannielle Titterington not scoring a try.
  - The New Zealand Rugby League Almanack has Nicola Simpson scoring two tries, and Dannielle Titterington scoring one try.
  - The above table reflects the League Express account.
  - the two sources agree on the remaining scorers in the Tonga match, as well as on the scorers for Great Britain in their match against the New Zealand Māori
- Great Britain Team Support Staff were: Jackie Sheldon (head coach), Michaela Hirst (assistant coach), Andy MacDonald (team manager), Doreen Metcalf (Tour Manager), Joanna Bates (doctor), and Elaine Kirton (physiotherapist).
- Samantha Bailey, Samantha Brook, Stacey Greenwood, Renee Gregoire and Natalie Parsons were all representatives from the Bradford Thunderbirds club.
- Andrea Dobson and Sarah Dixon were representatives of the Pendle Panthers club.
- Nicola Benstead was a representative from the Hull Dockers club.
- Bev Langan and Nicola Parry were representatives of the York Acorn Ladies club.
- Aimee Bradshaw and Wendy Charnley were representatives of the Bank Quay Broncos club.

== New Zealand ==
New Zealand played six matches: Cook Islands, Tokelau, Australia, Samoa, Great Britain (semi-final) and New Zealand Māori (final). New Zealand's World Cup squad was named in early June, nearly four months ahead of the tournament, which began on 28 September 2003. The team to play Tokelau appeared in a New Zealand Herald article on the day of the match.

Player	Position(s)	Club	Province	T	G	Pts
Luisa Avaiki	Prop, Second-row, Centre	Richmond Rovers	Auckland	4	0	16
Mere Baker	Centre	Papanui Tigers	Canterbury	3	0	12
Lorina Buckley	Loose forward	Richmond Rovers	Auckland	1	0	4
Tafale Chan Ting	Halfback, Hooker	Richmond Rovers	Auckland	1	0	4
Nadene Conlon	Loose forward, Second-row, Hooker	Te Atatu Roosters	Auckland	2	0	8
Karen Dougall	Second-row	—	Wellington	0	0	0
Selena Edmonds	Centre	Te Atatu Roosters	Wellington	5	0	20
Marion Heather	Loose forward, Second-row, Prop	Richmond Rovers	Auckland	6	4	32
Maryanne Hemara	Hooker	Mangere East Hawks	Auckland	0	0	0
Trish Hina	Stand-off	Te Atatu Roosters	Wellington	9	23	82
Honey Hireme	Centre	Forestland Falcons	Bay of Plenty	10	0	40
Annabelle Hohepa	Prop	Richmond Rovers	Auckland	0	0	0
Teasha Leka	Centre, Second-row	Mt Wellington	Auckland	0	0	0
Kelly Leota	Fullback, Wing	Otahuhu Leopards	Auckland	2	2	12
Laura Mariu	Stand-off, Loose forward	Otahuhu Leopards	Auckland	2	0	8
Ina Muaiava	Second-row, Centre	Richmond Rovers	Auckland	0	0	0
Dawn Patelesio	Prop	—	Wellington	0	0	0
Tamaku Paul	Wing, Fullback	Forestland Falcons	Bay of Plenty	9	0	36
Khardine Pohatu	Wing	—	Auckland	1	0	4
Sarai Sue	Prop	Mt Wellington	Auckland	0	6	12
Cynthia Ta'ala	Wing, Fullback	Richmond Rovers	Auckland	3	0	12
Lovey Tawhi	Second-row, Prop	Otahuhu Leopards	Auckland	2	0	8
Awhina Te Hiko	Halfback, Hooker	Forestland Falcons	Bay of Plenty	0	0	0
Tessa Te Kahu	Loose forward, Hooker	Papanui Tigers	Canterbury	3	0	12
Fuarosa Time	Wing	Randwick Kingfishers	Wellington	10	0	40
Leah Witehira	Halfback	Otahuhu Leopards	Auckland	3	0	12
Totals				76	36	376

Coaching and support staff:

- Coach: Lawrence Brydon
- Assistant Coach: Stan Martin
- Manager: Juanita Woodhouse
- Trainer: Bob Vercoe
- Physiotherapist: Leah Pearsail
- Assistant trainer/strapper: Hugh McKechnie

== New Zealand Māori ==
New Zealand Māori played six matches: Australia, Niue, Great Britain, Cook Islands, Australia (semi-final) and New Zealand (final).

On 8 August, prior to the World Cup which began in late September 2003, a Test Match between Australia and New Zealand Māori was played at Suncorp Stadium in Brisbane. The teams were listed in the Big League programme. Players in the Māori team were named as follows: Natasha Tehiko, Mere Miki, Annie Brown, Awaroa Waikai, Rachael Wikepa (Wikeepa), Puawai Hohepa, Kelly Kiwi, Vicki Letele, Tania Martin, Karla Clay (Klay), Jodi Piutau (Puitau), Sharyle Winikeri, Tirina Whakatihi; Cecily Stainton, Susan Wilkinson, Faith Dickson, Ani Ngala, Leanne Gardner, Amy Turner with Greg Brown as coach. Names in parentheses reflect the spelling used in the New Zealand Rugby League Almanac.

Player	Position(s)	Club	Province	T	G	Pts
Annie Brown	Centre, Stand-off	Forestland Falcons	Bay of Plenty	0	0	0
Karla Clay	Prop	Papakura Sea Eagles	Auckland	1	0	4
Faith Dickson	Centre	Ngongotaha Chiefs	Bay of Plenty	0	0	0
Natasha Emery	Second-row	Te Aroha Eels	Wellington	3	0	12
Leanne Gardiner	Centre	Mangere East Hawks	Auckland	0	0	0
Puawai Hohepa	Stand-off	Pikiao Warriors	Bay of Plenty	2	1	10
Kellie Kiwi	Halfback	Forestland Falcons	Bay of Plenty	1	1	6
Vicki Letele	Second-row, Prop	Otahuhu Leopards	Auckland	2	0	8
Lishelle Ngawini	Centre	Papakura Sea Eagles	Auckland	0	0	0
Rochelle Potaka	Loose forward, Second-row	Otahuhu Leopards	Auckland	2	6	20
Jodie Puitau	Prop	Otahuhu Leopards	Auckland	1	0	4
Cecily Stainton	Stand-off	Ngongotaha Chiefs	Bay of Plenty	1	0	4
Hinei Taute	Centre, Fullback	Ngongotaha Chiefs	Bay of Plenty	3	0	12
Frances Te Ao	Second-row	Te Aroha Eels	Wellington	0	0	0
Natasha Tehiko	Fullback, Centre	Forestland Falcons	Bay of Plenty	0	0	0
Heremia Timu	Centre, Wing	Papakura Sea Eagles	Auckland	3	0	12
Amy Turner	Wing	Pikiao Warriors	Bay of Plenty	2	0	8
Awaroa Waikai	Second-row, Prop	Mt Wellington	Auckland	4	0	16
Tania Watson	Second-row, Loose forward	Te Aroha Eels	Wellington	0	0	0
Iria Whakatihi	Stand-off	Te Aroha Eels	Wellington	0	2	4
Miriama Whakatihi	Prop	Te Aroha Eels	Wellington	0	0	0
Terina Whakatihi	Loose forward	Te Aroha Eels	Wellington	0	0	0
Rachel Wikeepa	Wing	Forestland Falcons	Bay of Plenty	4	0	16
Susan Wilkinson	Second-row, Loose forward	Otahuhu Leopards	Auckland	0	0	0
Sharyl Winikerei	Second-row	Forestland Falcons	Bay of Plenty	0	0	0
Totals				29	10	136

Coaching and support staff:

- Coach: Greg Brown
- Assistant Coach: Len Reid
- Manager: Angela Hodge
- Trainers: Kara Hodge, Mark Edmonds
- Physiotherapist: Naumai Tuta
- Statistician: Janie Thompson

== Niue ==
Niue played five matches: New Zealand Māori, Australia, Tokelau, Tonga and Samoa. The first match, against New Zealand Māori, was their international debut.

Player	Position(s)	Club	Province	T	G	Pts
Sana Aisoli	Fullback	Ponsonby Ponies	Auckland	1	0	4
D Bloomfield		—	—	0	2	4
Suerena Comer	Centre	Ponsonby Ponies	Auckland	3	0	12
Vate Ekepati	Second-row	Otara Scorpions	Auckland	0	0	0
Caroline Fanamanu	Wing	Otahuhu Leopards	Auckland	2	0	8
S Fanokehe		—	—	2	1	10
Doreen Fenton	Prop	Otahuhu Leopards	Auckland	0	0	0
Shirley Ikifitu	Prop	Otara Scorpions	Auckland	1	0	4
Treena Kumitau	Wing	Otara Scorpions	Auckland	0	0	0
Priscilla Lavakula	Wing	Otara Scorpions	Auckland	0	0	0
Memali Mafileo-Posoni	Centre	Te Atatu Roosters	Wellington	0	0	0
Angie Mizziebo	Stand-off	Otara Scorpions	Auckland	0	0	0
Christina Patii	Hooker	Ponsonby Ponies	Auckland	0	0	0
Taako Piaso	Loose forward, Second-row	Te Atatu Roosters	Wellington	2	0	8
Leilana Pulevaka	Wing	Manukau Magpies	Auckland	0	0	0
Melinda Seini	Wing, Hooker	Otahuhu Leopards	Auckland	0	0	0
Mekeaukui Sifaheone	Centre, Wing	Richmond Rovers	Auckland	0	0	0
Jannine Stewart	Second-row	Otara Scorpions	Auckland	0	0	0
Jacqueline Talagi	Wing	Ellerslie Eagles	Auckland	0	0	0
Emily Telfer	Halfback	Mt Wellington	Auckland	1	0	4
Jo Tichkowsky	Prop	Te Atatu Roosters	Wellington	0	0	0
Totals				12	3	54

Coaching and support staff:

- Coach: Meke Lokeni
- Manager: Grace Kapinua
- Strapper: Tomsai Nuku

Note:

- D Broomfield and S Fanokehe were named as scorers for Niue in the Almanack but were not listed in the Programme.

== Samoa ==
Samoa played six matches: Great Britain, Tonga, New Zealand, Australia, Niue and Cook Islands. The first match, against Great Britain, was their international debut.

Player	Position(s)	Club	Province	T	G	Pts
Tapu Ali'ifa'alogo	Prop, Second-row	Forestland Falcons	Bay of Plenty	0	0	0
Ane Chan Kee	Hooker, Halfback, Centre	Richmond Rovers	Auckland	0	0	0
Lita Clark	Hooker, Second-row	Richmond Rovers	Auckland	0	0	0
Sera Clayton	Prop, Second-row, Loose forward	Otahuhu Leopards	Auckland	0	0	0
Tuiai Elisara	Wing, Fullback	Mangere East Hawks	Auckland	2	0	8
Vanessa Elisara	Second-row, Loose forward	Mangere East Hawks	Auckland	0	0	0
Laine Fa'apito	Prop, Second-row, Centre	Otahuhu Leopards	Auckland	1	0	4
Meto Kirisome	Second-row, Centre, Stand-off	Ponsonby Ponies	Auckland	0	0	0
Stephanie Lafaele	Centre, Wing	Richmond Rovers	Auckland	0	0	0
Moana Laumatia	Centre	Te Aroha Eels	Wellington	4	0	16
Wendy Leafa	Halfback, Centre, Fullback	Pikiao Warriors	Bay of Plenty	0	0	0
Te'evahale Lefale	Second-row, Loose forward, Centre	Otahuhu Leopards	Auckland	2	0	8
Amy Levi	Halfback, Wing	Richmond Rovers	Auckland	1	0	4
Tolotea Lome	Prop, Second-row, Wing	Richmond Rovers	Auckland	0	0	0
Brigitta Lotu-Iiga	Second-row, Centre, Wing	Richmond Rovers	Auckland	0	0	0
Theresa Malaitai	Second-row, Loose forward, Centre	Te Atatu Roosters	Wellington	1	0	4
Angel Mulu	Halfback, Centre, Fullback	North City Vikings	Wellington	0	0	0
Jean Oti	Halfback, Centre, Fullback	Wainuiomata Lions	Wellington	3	3	18
Ianeta Peau	Prop, Second-row	Richmond Rovers	Auckland	0	0	0
Tepatasiane Pomare	Prop, Second-row, Centre	Ponsonby Ponies	Auckland	0	0	0
Leah Sao-Filipo	Prop	Otahuhu Leopards	Auckland	1	0	4
Diana Sipili	Centre, Wing	Te Aroha Eels	Wellington	3	0	12
Carmelia Smith	Wing	Ponsonby Ponies	Auckland	0	0	0
Maima Tiatia	Second-row, Centre	Otahuhu Leopards	Auckland	0	0	0
Helen Tuimavave	Centre, Loose forward, Second-row	Te Atatu Roosters	Wellington	7	0	28
Lolina (Leota) Tuioti	Second-row, Centre	North City Vikings	Wellington	3	1	14
Totals				28	4	120

Coaching and support staff:

- Coach: George Apelii Tuimaseve
- Assistant Coach: Sefo Fuimaono
- Managers: Mary Malloy, Leie Sipel-Schaumkei
- Trainers: Jason McCarthy, Feleti Lefao

== Tokelau ==
Tokelau played six matches: Cook Islands, New Zealand, Tonga, Niue, Cook Islands and Tonga. The first match, against Cook Islands, was their international debut.

Player	Position(s)	Club	Province	T	G	Pts
Sagita Aleni	Wing	North City Vikings	Wellington	0	0	0
Maria Atapuai Alesana	Second-row	North City Vikings	Wellington	1	0	4
Tolua Ariu	Second-row	Te Atatu Roosters	Wellington	1	0	4
Lise Baker	Prop	North City Vikings	Wellington	3	0	12
Ana Fidow	Prop	Randwick Kingfishers	Wellington	0	0	0
Campaign Fidow	Prop, Second-row, Loose forward	Randwick Kingfishers	Wellington	0	0	0
Jenny Finau	Prop	Randwick Kingfishers	Wellington	1	0	4
Peta Ineleo	Second-row	Wainuiomata Lions	Wellington	0	0	0
Johana Lemihio	Second-row	Randwick Kingfishers	Wellington	0	0	0
Julie Lemihio	Wing	Randwick Kingfishers	Wellington	0	0	0
J Lenusio	interchange	—	—	3	0	12
Ahi Loloa	Prop	North City Vikings	Wellington	0	0	0
Taloanga Mataio	Wing	Randwick Kingfishers	Wellington	0	0	0
Rhys Nouata-Nikotema	Second-row	Wainuiomata Lions	Wellington	0	0	0
Matalena Omara	Halfback, Centre, Fullback	Richmond Rovers	Auckland	0	0	0
Ana Pedro	Prop	Randwick Kingfishers	Wellington	3	0	12
Akenese Pereira	Stand-off	Randwick Kingfishers	Wellington	1	0	4
Belia Perez	Fullback	Randwick Kingfishers	Wellington	0	0	0
Pele Puka	Second-row	Randwick Kingfishers	Wellington	1	0	4
Naomi Silao	Centre	Randwick Kingfishers	Wellington	1	4	12
Ana So'otaga	Loose forward	Randwick Kingfishers	Wellington	2	0	8
Ana Tuia	Prop	Randwick Kingfishers	Wellington	1	0	4
Vaililo Toloa	Centre	North City Vikings	Wellington	2	0	8
Jacqueline Vaovasa	Prop	North City Vikings	Wellington	0	0	0
Maria Wilson	Centre	—	—	2	0	8
Totals				22	4	96

Coaching and support staff:

- Coach: Tony Lajpold
- Assistant Coach: John Misley
- Manager: Mat So'otaga
- Physiotherapist: Matt Willett

Note

- J Lenusio was named as a scorer in the Almanack but was not listed – at least with the same spelling – in the Programme.

== Tonga ==
Tonga played five matches: Samoa, Great Britain, Tokelau, Niue and Tokelau. The first match, against Samoa, was their international debut.

Player	Club	T	G	Pts
Sepiuta Tonga 'Alatini	Fuekafa Rabbitohs	1	1	6
Lupe Fiefia	Ha'ateiho Crusaders	0	0	0
Lupe Fisilau	Kolomu'a Warriors	1	0	4
Ema Lu'isa Havea	Kolomu'a Warriors	0	0	0
Isapela Hopoi	Kolomu'a Warriors	0	0	0
Ana 'Iongi	Kolomu'a Warriors	0	0	0
Ana Uikelotu Katoa	Mu'a Saints	0	0	0
Uluaki Fuifuilupe Kaufusi	Mu'a Saints	3	0	12
Elenoa Lauhingoa	Fuekafa Rabbitohs	0	0	0
Seini Malungahu	Fuekafa Rabbitohs	0	0	0
Olivia Moimoi	Kolomu'a Warriors	1	0	4
Akameta Paongo	Fuekafa Rabbitohs	0	0	0
Sisi'uno Pasikala	Mu'a Saints	1	0	4
Na'a Pole	Mu'a Saints	0	0	0
Lomekina Ta'ai	Fuekafa Rabbitohs	0	0	0
Eseta Vea Toluta'u	Mu'a Saints	1	0	4
Ma'ata Tonga	Fuekafa Rabbitohs	0	0	0
Sesimani Tupou Tu'ifua	Mu'a Saints	0	0	0
Celestyana Valu	Fuekafa Rabbitohs	0	0	0
Tokilupe Veamatahau	Fuekafa Rabbitohs	0	0	0
Totals		8	1	34

The Programme did not list Tonga's coaching and support staff.
