= Shannon Willoughby =

- Born: 15 January 1982 (age 44)
- Height: 1.75 m (5 ft 9 in)
- Weight: 80 kg (180 lb; 12 st 8 lb)

Rugby union career
- Position: Loose forward
Provincial / State sides
Years	Team	Apps	(Points)
2000–2006	Otago		(0)
2008	Hawke's Bay	6	(0)
2015–2016	Auckland	15	(10)
International career
Years	Team	Apps	(Points)
2005–2008	New Zealand	9	(0)
Medal record
Representing New Zealand
Women's rugby union
Rugby World Cup
Gold medal – first place	2006 Canada	Team competition

Shannon Willoughby (born 15 January 1982) is a former New Zealand rugby union player. She played for New Zealand internationally and at provincial level for Hawke's Bay. She previously captained Otago.

== Rugby career ==
On 29 June 2005, Willoughby made her test debut for the Black Ferns against Scotland at the Canada Cup in Ottawa. She also featured in the two games against Canada in the competition.

Willoughby was member of the Black Ferns squad that won the 2006 Women's Rugby World Cup. She appeared in all of the matches at the tournament.

She played her last international against the Wallaroos on 18 October 2008 at Canberra, it was the final match of the Laurie O'Reilly Cup.

In 2015, she returned to playing rugby and played her final game for Auckland on World Stroke Day.

== Personal life ==
Willoughby was instructed by Matthew Greenslade when she obtained her commercial pilots' license from Ardmore Flying School in 2011.

She suffered a stroke at the age of 32. She discovered the benefits of aromatherapy diffusers and essential oils, then founding Aromarrr NZ. In 2023, after expanding the product range, she launched Seven Scents, selling home fragrance and skincare.

In 2015, she received her aviation medical back, after being told she would likely never fly again. A 2017 International Women’s Forum (IWF) Global Women Athletes' Business Network member, Willoughby is now part of the IWF NZ Founding Committee.
