= Ruth McKay =

NZ international rugby union player

- Born: 2 August 1986 (age 40)
- Height: 1.7 m (5 ft 7 in)
- Weight: 83 kg (183 lb; 13 st 1 lb)

Rugby union career
- Position: Prop
Provincial / State sides
| Years | Team | Apps | (Points) |
| 2003–2013 | Manawatu | 43 | (5) |
International career
| Years | Team | Apps | (Points) |
| 2007–2014 | New Zealand | 26 | (0) |
Medal record
Representing New Zealand
Women's rugby union
Rugby World Cup
| Gold medal – first place | 2010 England | Team competition |

Ruth McKay (born 2 August 1986) is a New Zealand rugby union player. She plays Prop for New Zealand and Manawatu. She was a member of the 2010 Rugby World Cup winning squad. She also competed in the 2014 Rugby World Cup in France.

== Rugby career ==
McKay attended Taihape College where she began playing rugby as a third-former. She first played for Manawatu in 2003, she was still a seventh-former student at Whanganui Girls' College.

McKay made her international debut for New Zealand on 16 October 2007 against Australia at Wanganui. She made her second appearance for the side in Porirua. She faced the Wallaroos again a year later in the 2008 Laurie O'Reilly Cup at Canberra. She played in both test matches.

In 2009, she was named in the Black Ferns side that toured England in November.

McKay was a member of the 2010 Rugby World Cup winning squad. She started in their opening match of the World Cup against South Africa. She also competed against Australia, Wales and France. She started in the World Cup final against England where the Black Ferns claimed their fourth title.

In 2012, she was selected for the Black Ferns squad that toured England for a three-test series in November. She featured in every game which England eventually won to claim the series.

In 2013, she was in the Black Ferns squad that took on England again in their July tour of New Zealand. The first test took place in Auckland which her side won despite some defensive dominance from England. She started in the second test in which they clinched the series with a narrow margin at Hamilton. She came off the bench in the final game as her side secured the series 3–0 with an emphatic 29–8 win.

She played in the Black Ferns side that competed in an international women's rugby series in Rotorua in June 2014. The fixture included matches against Australia, Canada and Samoa. She started in the final game of the series against Canada at Whakatāne.

McKay made the selection for her final World Cup appearance at the 2014 tournament in France. She started in the opening match against Kazakhstan. She then featured in the pool game where Ireland stunned the Black Ferns with their first defeat in a World Cup since their 1991 semi-final loss to the United States. She played her last international game in her side's fifth place playoff against the Eagles.

McKay is a shepherd in Hunterville, New Zealand.
