= Tasileta Bethell =

Australian rugby union player (born 1983)

- Born: 3 July 1983 (age 43) Amaile, Samoa
- School: Onehunga High School (NZ), Woodridge State HS (Aust)

Rugby union career
- Position: No. 8
International career
Years	Team	Apps	(Points)
2006–2008	Australia	9	(0)

Tasileta Bethell (born 3 July 1983) is a former Australian rugby union player. She made her international debut for Australia against South Africa at the 2006 Rugby World Cup in Canada. She was named in the starting line-up for the Wallaroos side that beat Ireland 18–14 for seventh place.

In July 2007, Bethell was selected in Queensland's squad for the national women's championships in Sydney. She was named in the Wallaroos squad for the 2007 Laurie O'Reilly Cup that was hosted by New Zealand. She then made her last test appearance for the side a year later in Canberra against the Black Ferns for the O'Reilly Cup.
