= National Women's Rugby Championship =

- Sport: Rugby union
- Instituted: 1996
- Inaugural season: 1996
- Ceased: 2018
- Number of teams: 8
- Country: Australia

The National Women's Championship was the highest-tier competition of women's rugby union in Australia through the 2017 season. It was superseded as the top level of the women's sport by the new Super W competition from the 2018 season forward.

The annual tournament was contested by teams from every state except Tasmania. The Championship also acted as a selection tool for the Australia women's national rugby union team, that competes at the Women's Rugby World Cup.

== Teams ==
The teams that competed for the National Women's Championship, as of 2013, were:

- (Australian Capital Territory) ACT and Southern New South Wales
- New South Wales Country
- Northern Territory
- Queensland
- South Australia
- (New South Wales) Sydney
- (Victoria (state)) Victoria
- Western Australia

== Champions ==
The tournament was contested from 1996 onwards until the 2017 season.

Winners of the National Women's Championship:

- 1996 Queensland
- 1997 Queensland
- 1998 Queensland
- 1999 New South Wales
- 2000 New South Wales
- 2003 Sydney Gold
- 2004 Sydney White
- 2005 Sydney Gold
- 2006 Queensland
- 2007 Sydney
- 2008 Sydney
- 2009 Queensland
- 2010 Sydney
- 2011 Queensland
- 2012 Sydney
- 2013 Sydney
- 2014 not held
- 2015 Sydney
- 2016 Sydney
- 2017 Sydney

== See also ==
- Australia women's national rugby union team
- Australia women's national rugby sevens team
- Super W
- Women's rugby union in Australia
