= Aimee Sutorius =

New Zealand rugby union and sevens player

- Born: 27 May 1979 (age 47) Auckland, New Zealand
- Height: 1.7 m (5 ft 7 in)
- Weight: 72 kg (159 lb)

Rugby union career
- Position: Flanker
Amateur team(s)
Years	Team	Apps	(Points)
1998-2001	Harbour Hawks		
2002-2022	Northern United	172	
2017	Utrecht		
2020	Alhambra Union		
Provincial / State sides
Years	Team	Apps	(Points)
1999-2001	Otago		
2002–2015	Wellington	57	(58)
International career
Years	Team	Apps	(Points)
2007–2009	New Zealand	3	(0)

Aimee Sutorius (born 27 May 1979) is a former New Zealand rugby union and sevens player. She competed at an international level for New Zealand and at provincial level for Wellington and Otago. She also played for the Black Ferns sevens side. She also represented Wellington for Rugby League, Otago and Wellington in Football (soccer), and Wellington and New Zealand for Tag Football.

== Sporting career ==
=== Rugby XVs ===
In 2001, she was a trialist for the Black Ferns ahead of their two-test series against England in June. She fought season-ending injuries in 2003 and 2005. She made her test debut for the Black Ferns on 20 October 2007 against Australia at Porirua. She is Black Fern #145.

Sutorius featured in the two tests against the Wallaroos at Canberra in 2008. Her last appearance for the Black Ferns was against an England A side at Esher on 17 November 2009.

She was selected for the Black Ferns training squad ahead of the 2010 Women's Rugby World Cup in England.

In 2015, Sutorius was named in a wider Black Ferns training squad for a 12-month high performance training programme beginning in 2016 in preparation for the 2017 Rugby World Cup in Ireland.

=== Rugby Sevens ===
She was part of the Black Ferns sevens trial squad for the inaugural Women's Rugby World Cup Sevens in Dubai. She played in the world cup qualifying tournament in Samoa in 2009, and is Black Fern Seven's player #19.

She was unfortunately ruled out of the World Cup team with injury. Sutorius focused on sevens in 2012 in hopes of a gold medal as rugby was making its return to the Olympics in Rio.

=== Rugby League ===
Sutorius played a single year of Rugby League in 2022, representing the Wellington Orcas at the National Championship.

=== Tag Football ===
Sutorius represented Wellington at the National Championships many times from 2007-2019, and was part of the World Cup winning New Zealand Barbarians Open Mixed team in 2008.

=== Football (Soccer) ===
Sutorius played for the New Zealand Universities women's team from 1997-2001, and played for the Otago University women's team in those same years.

She also represented Wellington and played for the Marist Football Club in Wellington from 2002-2005.

=== Rugby Coaching career ===
Sutorius began rugby coaching in 2012, with her club Northern United in Porirua, and coached them through to 2014, winning the club championship in 2013.

She coached for the Rhinos Rugby Academy in 2016 and 2017, and was the Elite U18s coach for the Rhinos Rugby Academy in California in 2017.

She was assistant coach for the Wellington Pride 7s in 2018, and head coach of their Under 18 7s team.

Sutorius was assistant coach for the Otago Spirit from 2019-2020, winning the Farah Palmer Cup Championship division. She also coached the Otago women's sevens team for the national sevens tournament in 2019. She was the Women's High Performance Player Development Manager for Otago Rugby from 2019-2020.

She was announced as the Women's Head Coach for Northern United Rugby Football Club for the 2022 season. She was a player-coach and led the Northern United team to winning the Tia Paasi Memorial Trophy.

2022 was a busy year as she also coached the Stars team at the LA 7s, and was head coach for the Serengeti Elephants team at the Rugby Championship 10s in South Africa.

Sutorius was named as an assistant coach for the Wellington Pride for both the 2021 and the 2023 Farah Palmer Cup.
