= Rebecca Cleary =

- Born: 5 August 1972 (age 54) Sydney
- School: Loreto Kirribilli

Rugby union career
- Position: Prop
International career
Years	Team	Apps	(Points)
1996–2002	Australia	12	(0)

Rebecca Cleary (née Wakim; born 5 August 1972) is a former Australian rugby union player. She made her test debut for Australia against the Black Ferns in 1996 in Sydney. She represented Australia at the 1998 and 2002 Rugby World Cup's.

In 2000, Cleary played for the Lady Waratahs team against the Auckland Storm in a Super 12 curtain raiser at Eden Park.

She was inducted into the NSW Waratahs inaugural Hall of Fame in June 2024.
