= Olivia Coady =

New Zealand rugby union player

- Born: 9 August 1990 (age 36) Burwood, New Zealand
- Height: 1.6 m (5 ft 3 in)
- Weight: 69 kg (152 lb)

Rugby union career
- Position: Flanker
Provincial / State sides
Years	Team	Apps	(Points)
2007–2012	Canterbury	38	(50)
International career
Years	Team	Apps	(Points)
2008–2009	New Zealand	4	(5)

Olivia Coady (born 9 August 1990) is a New Zealand rugby union player. She played internationally for New Zealand and for Canterbury at provincial level.

== Rugby career ==
Coady first played rugby as a seven-year-old to impress a boy at school. She attended Villa Maria College in Christchurch.

Coady was named in the New Zealand side for their two test series against Australia in 2008. She was 18 when she made her international debut for the Black Ferns against the Wallaroos on 14 October at Canberra. She also featured for the side in the second test.

In 2009, she was part of the Canterbury side that lost to Auckland in their Provincial Championship final. She was selected in the Black Ferns squad for their November tour of England. She also featured in the match against an England A side at Esher. She played in the second test which they lost to England.

In 2010, she was named in the Black Ferns training squad in preparation for the Rugby World Cup in England.

Coady played for the Valley Black Ladies club in Hong Kong's Women's Premiership competition. She scored five tries for the side in their final match of the 2015–16 season. She also appeared for the side in their 2016–17 final against Gai Wu Falcons. She scored two tries for the Valley Black Ladies against the Gai Wu Falcons in 2021.
