= Silei Poluleuligaga =

- Born: 8 March 1981 (age 45) Ōtāhuhu, Auckland, NZ

Rugby union career
- Position: Hooker
International career
Years	Team	Apps	(Points)
2006–2010	Australia	13	(0)

Silei Etuale (née Poluleuligaga; born 8 March 1981) is a former Australian rugby union player.

== Biography ==
Poluleuligaga played in the 2006 Rugby World Cup in Canada. In October 2007, she was named in the Wallaroos squad for the two-Test series against New Zealand. She faced the Black Ferns again a year later when Australia played hosts for another test series.

Poluleuligaga was a member of the squad to the 2010 Rugby World Cup that finished in third place. She replaced Margaret Watson in the starting line up in their semi-final match against England.
