= Kimberly Smith (rugby union) =

- Born: 21 August 1985 (age 41)
- Height: 1.76 m (5 ft 9 in)
- Weight: 68 kg (150 lb)

Rugby union career
- Position: Lock
Provincial / State sides
Years	Team	Apps	(Points)
2005	Canterbury		(0)
International career
Years	Team	Apps	(Points)
2005–2009	New Zealand	12	(0)
Medal record
Representing New Zealand
Women's rugby union
Rugby World Cup
Gold medal – first place	2006 Canada	Team competition

Kimberly Smith (born 21 August 1985) is a former New Zealand rugby union player. She played internationally for New Zealand and provincially for Canterbury. She was part of the Black Ferns squad that won the 2006 Rugby World Cup in Canada.

Smith has also represented New Zealand in Volleyball both at national and international level. She captained the Christchurch-based volleyball club, the Shirley Silverbacks, when they won the NZ Women's Volleyball League competition in 2015.

In 2019, Smith was named as captain of the New Zealand women's volleyball team in a series against Australia.
