= Charmain Steventon =

- Born: 17 February 1977 (age 49) Auckland, New Zealand
- School: Whangarei Girls' High School

Rugby union career
- Position: Wing
International career
Years	Team	Apps	(Points)
2001–2002	Australia	5	(0)

Charmain Steventon (née Smith; born 17 February 1977) is a former Australian rugby union player. She made her test debut for Australia in 2001 against England. She has also represented Australia in rugby sevens.

Steventon competed for the Wallaroos at the 2002 Rugby World Cup in Spain. She was named on the bench for their final pool game against the Black Ferns.

Steventon was appointed as Director of Women's Rugby for West Harbour Rugby in 2022. She was inducted into the NSW Waratahs inaugural Hall of Fame in June 2024.
