= Karla Matua =

- Born: 17 May 1970 (age 56) Whangārei, New Zealand
- School: Green Bay High School; Rutherford College

Rugby union career
- Position: Prop
International career
Years	Team	Apps	(Points)
1994	Australia	1	(0)

Karla Matua (née Clay; born 17 May 1970) is a former Australian rugby union and league player.

== Rugby career ==
=== Rugby union ===
Matua has the honour of being the Wallaroos first capped player, which was presented in 2008. She was born in Whangārei, New Zealand and attended Green Bay High School, and Rutherford College in Auckland. She made her only appearance for Australia in their first international test against the Black Ferns on 2 September 1994 at Sydney.

She has played provincially for the Auckland Storm and the Counties Manukau Heat.

=== Rugby league ===
Matua competed for the New Zealand Māori women's side at the 2003 Women's Rugby League World Cup; she played in the final against the Kiwi Ferns.
