= Rachel Wikeepa =

Rugby union career
Provincial / State sides
Years	Team	Apps	(Points)
	Bay of Plenty		(0)
National sevens team
Years	Team		Comps
2009	New Zealand		

Rachel Wikeepa is a former New Zealand rugby sevens player. She represented New Zealand at the 2009 Rugby World Cup Sevens in Dubai.

== Biography ==
Wikeepa is a former New Zealand Touch and Māori Women's Rugby League player. She has represented her regions and New Zealand in several sports; netball, athletics, rugby, rugby league, rugby sevens and touch.

In 2001, Wikeepa was named in the Black Ferns sevens Development Squad for the International Women's Sevens Tournament at Upper Hutt. She was named in a 22-women trial squad for the inaugural Women's Rugby World Cup Sevens in 2009.

Wikeepa took part in a charity boxing event that was held at the G2 Bar and Events Centre in Tauranga in 2013.
