= Kylie Pennell =

Australian rugby union player (born 1978)

- Born: 24 July 1978 (age 48) Coonamble, NSW
- School: Coonamble High School

Rugby union career
- Position: Prop
International career
| Years | Team | Apps | (Points) |
| 2007–2009 | Australia | 5 | (0) |

Kylie Michelle Pennell (born 24 July 1978) is a former Australian rugby union player. She was named in Australia's squad for a two-test series against New Zealand in the 2007 Laurie O'Reilly Cup. She was one of four debutantes that came off the bench in the first test in Whanganui. She also featured in the Wallaroos 29–12 loss in Porirua.

Pennell was also named in Australia's squad for the 2008 O'Reilly Cup competition. She made her final Wallaroos appearance against Samoa in 2009 in Apia, Samoa.
