= Bronwyn Mackintosh =

- Born: 24 June 1970 (age 56) Sydney
- School: Fort Street High School

Rugby union career
- Position: Flanker
International career
Years	Team	Apps	(Points)
1997–2002	Australia	14	(0)

Bronwyn Ngaire Mackintosh (born 24 June 1970) is a former Australian rugby union player. She competed for Australia at the 1998 and 2002 Women's Rugby World Cups.

== Rugby career ==
She made her test debut for Australia against the United States in 1997 in Brisbane. She represented Australia at the 1998 Rugby World Cup in the Netherlands.

Mackintosh was also part of the Wallaroos 2002 Rugby World Cup squad. She scored their first try at halftime in the 30–0 win over Wales during the pool stages. She was named in the starting line-up that faced the Black Ferns in their final pool game.

In 2007, Mackintosh competed at the Dubai International Sevens for the Wooden Spoon women's team. The team was made up of players from England, Scotland, Wales and Australia; they eventually won the tournament undefeated.

== Post-rugby career ==
Mackintosh is a Station Officer at Fire and Rescue New South Wales. During the Queen’s Birthday Honours in 2019, she was awarded the Australian Fire Service Medal (AFSM), the highest honour that an Australian firefighter can receive. She has a Bachelor in Sport Science from the University of Technology and studied for an MBA at Newcastle University.

She was inducted into the NSW Waratahs inaugural Hall of Fame in June 2024.
