= Alexandra Hargreaves =

- Born: 13 November 1980 (age 46) Sydney
- Height: 1.68 m (5 ft 6 in)
- Weight: 72 kg (159 lb)

Rugby union career
- Position: Flanker
Senior career
| Years | Team | Apps | (Points) |
| | Tuggeranong Vikings | | (5) |
| | Sydney University | | (0) |
International career
| Years | Team | Apps | (Points) |
| 2002–2012 | Australia | 17 | (5) |
National sevens team
| Years | Team | | Comps |
| 2008 | Australia | | |

Alexandra Hargreaves (born 13 November 1980) is a former Australian rugby union player. She has represented Australia in both fifteens and sevens.

== Rugby career ==
=== Playing ===
Hargreaves competed for the Wallaroos at the 2002 and 2006 Rugby World Cups.

In 2009, she was part of the Australian women's sevens team that won the Sevens World Cup in Dubai.

She was a member of the Wallaroos squad to the 2010 Rugby World Cup that finished in third place.

Hargreaves retired in 2012 along with former Wallaroo Debby Hodgkinson.

=== Coaching ===
Hargreaves is the assistant coach for the Sydney Uni Women's Rugby Club.
