= Halie Tiplady-Hurring =

- Born: 27 February 1986 (age 40)
- Height: 1.7 m (5 ft 7 in)
- Weight: 70 kg (150 lb; 11 st 0 lb)

Rugby union career
- Position(s): Wing, Fullback
Provincial / State sides
Years	Team	Apps	(Points)
2012–2013	Otago	11	(50)
2005–2011	Canterbury	37	(45)
International career
Years	Team	Apps	(Points)
2008–2014	New Zealand	12	(15)
Medal record
Representing New Zealand
Women's rugby union
Rugby World Cup
Gold medal – first place	2010 England	Team competition

Halie Tiplady-Hurring (born 27 February 1986) is a female rugby union player. She represents New Zealand and Otago. She was a member of the 2010 Women's Rugby World Cup winning squad and has been named in the 2014 Women's Rugby World Cup squad to France.
