= Lise Baker =

- Born: 17 October 1967 (age 59)
- Height: 1.73 m (5 ft 8 in)
- Weight: 80 kg (176 lb)

Rugby union career
- Position(s): Lock, Flanker
Provincial / State sides
Years	Team	Apps	(Points)
- Wellington
International career
Years	Team	Apps	(Points)
1990	New Zealand	3	(0)

Lise Baker (born 17 October 1967) is a former New Zealand rugby union player. She represented New Zealand at RugbyFest 1990 where she debuted against the Netherlands on 26 August at Ashburton, New Zealand. She later played against the United States and a World XV's team.
