= Danielle Meskell =

Australia international dual-code rugby player (born 1973)

- Born: 13 November 1973 (age 53)
- Height: 1.72 m (5 ft 8 in)
- Weight: 90 kg (198 lb)

Rugby union career
- Position: Prop
International career
Years	Team	Apps	(Points)
2008–2016	Australia	12	(0)
- Rugby league career

Playing information
Representative
Years	Team	Pld	T	G	FG	P
1996	Australia	2	0	0	0	0

Danielle Meskell (born 13 November 1973) is a former rugby union and rugby league player. She played for Australia in the 2010 and 2014 Women's Rugby World Cups.

== Career ==
=== Rugby league ===
Meskell represented the Jillaroos in 1996.

=== Rugby union ===
Meskell made her international debut for the Wallaroos on 14 October 2008 against the Black Ferns in Canberra.

She was a member of the Wallaroos squad to the 2010 Women's Rugby World Cup that finished in third place. She was named in Australia's 2014 World Cup squad.

She played club rugby for the Warringah Ratettes.

On 26 October 2016, she played her last test for the Wallaroos against New Zealand at North Shore. She was almost 43 at the time. She was inducted into the NSW Waratahs inaugural Hall of Fame in June 2024.
