= Se'ei Sa'u =

- Born: 3 November 1974 (age 52)

Rugby union career
- Position: Prop
Senior career
Years	Team	Apps	(Points)
- West Bulldogs
International career
Years	Team	Apps	(Points)
2006–2010	Australia	10	(0)

Se'ei Sa'u (born 3 November 1974) is a former Australian rugby union player. She represented Australia at the 2006 and 2010 Women's Rugby World Cups.

== Rugby career ==
Sa'u competed for Australia at the 2006 Women's Rugby World Cup in Canada.

In 2008, Sa'u was part of the Wallaroos squad that played a Two-Test series against the Black Ferns in Canberra in October.

She represented Australia at the 2010 Women's Rugby World Cup, they finished in third place.
