= Nicole Wickert =

- Born: 13 September 1968 (age 58) Sydney
- School: Wenona School

Rugby union career
- Position(s): Lock, No. 8
International career
| Years | Team | Apps | (Points) |
| 1994–2002 | Australia | 14 | (0) |

Nicole Wickert (born 13 September 1968) is an Australian former rugby union player. She played at Lock and Number 8 for Australia at international level. She captained Australia at their first Rugby World Cup in 1998 which was held in the Netherlands.

Wickert also made the Wallaroos squad for the 2002 Rugby World Cup in Spain. She was named in the starting line-up that faced the Black Ferns in their second pool game.

She was inducted into the NSW Waratahs inaugural Hall of Fame in June 2024.
