= Alana Thomas =

Australia international rugby union player

- Born: 18 March 1982 (age 44) Glen Innes, NSW
- School: Glen Innes High School

Rugby union career
- Position: Fly Half
International career
| Years | Team | Apps | (Points) |
| 2006–2008 | Australia | 7 | (0) |
Coaching career
- Years: Team
- 2018–2022: Melbourne Rebels (head coach)
- 2019: Australia A (assistant coach)

Alana Thomas (born 18 March 1982) is an Australian rugby union coach and a former player.

== Career ==
Thomas grew up playing basketball, rugby league and touch. She gave rugby union a go after she was spotted trying out for a netball team at university.

Thomas competed for Australia at the 2006 Rugby World Cup in Canada. She made her international debut for the Wallaroos in the second pool game against France. She later featured in their narrow 18–14 victory over Ireland for seventh place.

Thomas was named in a 22–player squad that played in a two-test series against New Zealand in October 2007.

=== Coaching career ===
Thomas started coaching in 2014, she started coaching sevens rugby with Rugby Victoria. She was named Rugby Australia's Community Coach of the year in 2017 after she took the Melbourne Unicorns to a premiership. In 2018, She became the inaugural Head Coach of the Melbourne Rebels in the Super W competition.

Thomas was an assistant coach for Australia A when they competed at the 2019 Oceania Rugby Women’s Championship in Fiji. She later earned a place on World Rugby's Coaching Internship Programme for the 2021 Rugby World Cup; she joined Fiji's management team as they prepared to make their tournament debut.

Thomas was replaced by Jason Rogers as Head Coach of the Melbourne Rebels for the upcoming 2023 Super W season.
