= New Zealand Women's Volleyball League =

- Current season, competition or edition: 2019–20 New Zealand Women's Volleyball League
- Sport: Volleyball
- Founded: 1968
- First season: 1968
- Administrator: NZV
- No. of teams: 9 (2019–20)
- Country: New Zealand
- Continent: Oceania
- International cup: AVC Club Volleyball Championship
- Website: http://www.volleyballnz.org.nz/

The New Zealand Women's Volleyball League is the major national volleyball competition for women in New Zealand, established in 1968. It is organized by New Zealand Volleyball Federation (VNZ).

== History ==
In the 2019/20 season, 9 teams has participated in a three Groups A, B, C the best 4 placed teams overall had qualified to the final four: Waikato, Canterbury, Harbour and Otago, The championship title was won by Harbor Raiders who beat Otago team by a 3:0 score single match.

== Winners list ==
Years	Champions
1968	Hamilton Teachers College
1969	Hamilton Teachers College
1970	Hamilton Teachers College
1971	Canterbury University
1972	Auckland Fire Brigade
1973	Otago University
1974	Canterbury University
1975	Nelson
1976	Sparta
1977	Sparta
1978	Canterbury University
1979	Canterbury University
1980	Le Coq Sportif
1981	Tauranga
1982	Canterbury University
1983	Porirua
1984	Porirua
1985	Porirua
1986	Sparta

Years	Champions
1987	Sparta
1988	Pioneer
1989	Akarana
1990	Akarana
1991	Pioneer
1992	Smash
1993	Smash
1994	Te Puke Sports
1995	Te Puke
1996	Smash
1997	Pioneer
1998	Baypak Te Puke
1999	Baypak Te Puke
2000	Baypak Te Puke
2001	99ers
2002	Satara Te Puke Sports
2003	Satara Te Puke Sports
2004	Satara Te Puke Sports
2005	Ezibuy Massey

Years	Champions
2006	Te Puke Sports
2007	Wellington NZIS
2008	Tauranga
2009	Manukau South Green
2010	Tauranga A
2011	Manukau South A
2012	Manukau South A
2013	Tauranga A
2014	North Harbour Raiders
2015	Shirley Silverbacks
2016	Harbour Raiders
2017	Harbour Raiders
2018	Tauranga A
2019	Harbour Raiders A
