= Vanessa Bradley =

- Born: 18 October 1976 (age 50) Rockhampton, QLD
- School: Cloncurry State HS

Rugby union career
- Position(s): Fly-half, No. 8, Prop
International career
Years	Team	Apps	(Points)
1996–2007	Australia	8	(0)

Vanessa Bradley (née Nooteboom; born 18 October 1976) is a former Australian rugby union player. She made her test debut for Australia against New Zealand, at Sydney, in 1996. She competed for Australia at the 2006 Rugby World Cup in Canada.

Bradley was part of the Queensland women’s team that played their first match against Canadian province Alberta in 1996. She went on to earn 30 caps for Queensland from then up to 2009.

In 2007, Bradley was named in a 22-player squad that toured New Zealand in October. She was awarded Australia Player of the Year in 2007, and Queensland Player of the Tournament in 2009. She played for the Classic Wallaroos side against the Central North Women in a ten-a-side match in 2019.
