= Beth Mallard =

NZ international rugby union player

- Born: Beth Louise Mallard; 5 August 1981 (age 45)
- Height: 1.65 m (5 ft 5 in)
- Weight: 85 kg (187 lb; 13 st 5 lb)
- University: University of Otago
- Notable relative: Trevor Mallard (father)

Rugby union career
- Position: Prop
Provincial / State sides
Years	Team	Apps	(Points)
1995–1998	Wellington		(0)
1999–2002, 2005–2010	Otago	50	(0)
International career
Years	Team	Apps	(Points)
2006–2009	New Zealand	8	(0)
Medal record
Representing New Zealand
Women's rugby union
Rugby World Cup
Gold medal – first place	2006 Canada	Team competition

Beth Louise Mallard (born 5 August 1981) is a former New Zealand rugby union player. She played for New Zealand and for Otago and Wellington. She was in the squad that won the 2006 Women's Rugby World Cup.

== Career ==
Mallard began her rugby career at Wellington Girls' College. She is the daughter of former Labour MP Trevor Mallard.

Mallard made her provincial debut for Otago in 1999 against Southland in Invercargill. She made her 50th appearance for Otago in 2010. She made her international debut for the Black Ferns on 4 September 2006 against Samoa at Edmonton.

In 2007, she was named in the Black Ferns squad that played Australia in a two test series. She featured in the two tests against England in 2009.

Mallard graduated with a doctorate in physiology in 2011 from the University of Otago.
