= Kim Wilson (rugby union) =

- Born: 27 September 1983 (age 43) Cooma, NSW
- School: Monaro High School

Rugby union career
- Position: Flanker
International career
Years	Team	Apps	(Points)
2006–2008	Australia	8	(0)

Kim Wilson (born 27 September 1983) is a former Australian rugby union player.

Wilson competed for Australia at the 2006 Rugby World Cup in Canada. She made her test debut for the Wallaroos against South Africa at the tournament. She came off the bench in her sides seventh place victory over Ireland.

Wilson was named in the Wallaroos squad for a two-test series against New Zealand for the O'Reilly Cup in October 2007.
