= Bob Hitchcock =

American high school football coach (1929–2026)

- Born: May 6, 1929; San Bernardino, California, U.S.
- Died: October 3, 2026 (aged 97); Auburn, California, U.S.
- Education: Victorville High School; San Jose State University

Robert William Hitchcock (May 6, 1929 – October 3, 2026) was an American high school football coach and educator. He served as the head football coach at Temple City High School in Temple City, California, where he built one of the most dominant high school football programs in Southern California. During his 22-season tenure, Hitchcock led the Temple City Rams to seven CIF Southern Section championships and established a then-state record 46-game winning streak. He was inducted into the California High School Football Hall of Fame in 2024.

== Background ==
Hitchcock was born on May 6, 1929, in San Bernardino, California, to Robert and Helen Hitchcock. He graduated from Victor Valley High School before attending Valley Junior College and later transferring to San Jose State University, where he played college football under head coach Bob Bronzan.

Following college, Hitchcock enlisted in the United States Air Force and served as a sergeant in the armory division in Japan during the Korean War, where he also played on the inter-squad travel football team. Upon returning to the United States, he earned his secondary teaching credential at the University of Redlands while beginning his coaching career, serving as an assistant coach for the Redlands Bulldogs in 1956.

Hitchcock died on October 3, 2026, at the age of 97.

== Coaching career ==
In 1957, Hitchcock relocated to Temple City, California, and joined the faculty of the Temple City Unified School District. He was named the head varsity football coach of the Temple City High School Rams in 1960. Hitchcock recorded 196 wins, 41 losses, and 0 ties over 22 seasons, including a 34–8–0 record in postseason play. He led the Rams to 11 Rio Hondo League titles and 7 CIF Southern Section titles. From 1969 to 1973, Hitchcock engineered a 46-game winning streak, which tied the California state record at the time before being eclipsed in 1977. His rosters were named the Cal-Hi Sports Division 3 State Team of the Year for three consecutive seasons (1971–1973).

== Legacy ==
On October 15, 2004, Temple City High School dedicated its home football stadium in his honor, renaming it Bob Hitchcock Stadium.
