= Sarah Corrigan =

Australian rugby union referee

- Born: 1980 (age 45–46)

Rugby union career
Refereeing career
Years	Competition	Apps
2006–2010	Women's RWC	
2007	U-19 World Championship	

Sarah Corrigan (born 1980) is an Australian international rugby union referee.

While going to Daramalan College in Canberra and playing rugby sevens, she decided to do a referee course, encouraged by her father. After the first appearance in a local under 11’s match in 1998, Corrigan received the B.A.R. Trophy by the ACT Rugby Referee's Association to the most improved senior referee in 2002 and became the first woman to officiate an ACT Premier Rugby First Grade match.

She got another record following her appointment for the 2006 Women's Rugby World Cup third/fourth playoff between Canada and France, held on 17 September at Commonwealth Stadium in Edmonton.

On 21 October 2007 she was awarded the 2007 IRB's Women’s Personality of the Year at Pavillon d'Armenonville in Paris's Allée de Longchamp for being the first female to referee at a male IRB tournament, when she took charge of the 2007 Under 19 Rugby World Championship match between Zimbabwe and Canada on 4 April at Queen's University of Belfast.

Corrigan refereed the 2010 Women's Rugby World Cup final between England and New Zealand, held at Twickenham Stoop on 5 September.
