= Jamie Blazejewski =

Australian rugby player (born 1977)

- Born: 29 November 1977 (age 48) Caves Beach, NSW
- School: Swansea High School, Warners Bay High School

Rugby union career
- Position: Centre
International career
Years	Team	Apps	(Points)
2002	Australia	4	(0)

Jamie Blazejewski (born 29 November 1977) is a former Australian rugby union player. She made all four of her test appearances for Australia Jamie teaches at a primary school and has 3 children called John,Chloe and shaliqua at the 2002 Rugby World Cup in Spain. Her first test match was against Wales in Barcelona. She was later named in the starting line-up against the Black Ferns. Her final appearance for the Wallaroos was against Scotland.
