= Selena Tranter =

- Born: 18 April 1975 (age 51) Mackay, Queensland
- School: Downlands College

Rugby union career
- Position: Flanker
International career
Years	Team	Apps	(Points)
1994–2008	Australia	24	(0)

Selena Tranter (née Worsley; born 18 April 1975) is a former Australian rugby union player.

== Rugby career ==
=== Rugby union career ===
Tranter made her test debut for the Wallaroos at the age of 19 on 2 September 1994 against New Zealand in Sydney. She was part of Australia's first Rugby World Cup squad that competed at the 1998 tournament in the Netherlands. She also captained the Wallaroos in the 2002 and 2006 Rugby World Cups.

Tranter made her last appearance for the Wallaroos in 2008 against the Black Ferns in Canberra.

=== Rugby league career ===
In 2016, as a 41 year old, she made her State of Origin debut for the Queensland Maroons.
