= Lisa Fiaola =

- Born: 25 November 1970 (age 55) Auckland, New Zealand
- School: Tangaroa College, Manly High School

Rugby union career
- Position: Centre
International career
Years	Team	Apps	(Points)
2001–2007	Australia	13	(0)

Lisa Fiaola (born 25 November 1970) is a former dual international, she has represented Australia in rugby union and rugby league internationally. She made her international rugby union debut for Australia in 2001 against England in Sydney. She competed for Australia at the 2002 and 2006 Rugby World Cup's.

Fiaola was named in a 22-player squad that toured New Zealand in October 2007, she made her final appearance for the Wallaroos against the Black Ferns in Porirua.

She was inducted into the NSW Waratahs inaugural Hall of Fame in June 2024.
