= Margaret Watson =

- Born: 18 December 1986 (age 39)
- Height: 1.69 m (5 ft 6 1/2 in)
- Weight: 80 kg (180 lb; 12 st 8 lb)

Rugby union career
- Position: Hooker
International career
Years	Team	Apps	(Points)
2008–2014	Australia	13	(0)
National sevens team
Years	Team		Comps
- Australia

Margaret Watson (born 18 December 1986) is an Australian rugby union player. She competed for Australia in the 2010 and 2014 Women's Rugby World Cups.

== Career ==
Watson was a member of the Australia's squad in the 2010 Women's Rugby World Cup that finished in third place. She was also selected in the Wallaroos side for the 2014 World Cup in France.

She was inducted into the NSW Waratahs inaugural Hall of Fame in June 2024.
