= Debby Hodgkinson =

Australia international rugby union player (born 1980)

Debby Carley
- Born: Debbie Marie Hodgkinson; 22 November 1980 (age 45)
- Height: 1.78 m (5 ft 10 in)
- Weight: 82 kg (181 lb; 12 st 13 lb)

Rugby union career
- Position: No. 8
International career
Years	Team	Apps	(Points)
2002–2010	Australia	9	(0)
National sevens team
Years	Team		Comps
2008	Australia		

Debby Carley (née Hodgkinson; born 22 November 1980) is an Australian former rugby union player. She competed for Australia at the 2002 and 2010 Women's Rugby World Cups.

== Rugby career ==
Carley made her international debut for Australia against Scotland at the 2002 Women's Rugby World Cup in Spain. She missed out on the 2006 World Cup due to a serious knee injury.

She was also a member of the Australian squad that finished in third place in the 2010 Women's Rugby World Cup that was held in England.

She has also represented Australia in rugby sevens in 2008. She subsequently competed at the 2009 Rugby World Cup Sevens in Dubai.

Carley announced her retirement from rugby in 2012.
