= Cheryl McAfee (rugby union) =

- Born: Cheryl Soon; 23 September 1975 (age 51) Auckland, New Zealand

Rugby union career
- Position: Scrumhalf
International career
Years	Team	Apps	(Points)
2001–2010	Australia	21	(0)
National sevens team
Years	Team		Comps
- Australia

Cheryl McAfee (née Soon; born 23 September 1975) is a former Australian rugby union player. She competed at the 2002, 2006 and 2010 Women's Rugby World Cups. She also represented Australia in rugby sevens.

== Career ==
McAfee represented Australia in both fifteens and sevens. She was a member of the Wallaroos squads to the 2002 and 2006 Rugby World Cups. She was also a member of the 2010 Rugby World Cup squad that finished in third place.

McAfee captained the Australian sevens team to the inaugural women's 2009 Rugby World Cup Sevens, they eventually won the tournament. She joined the IRB's Rugby Committee in 2012.

In 2021, World Rugby inducted McAfee into its World Rugby Hall of Fame, alongside Osea Kolinisau, Humphrey Kayange, Huriana Manuel, Will Carling and Jim Telfer.

She was inducted into the NSW Waratahs inaugural Hall of Fame in June 2024.
