= Tui Ormsby =

Australian rugby union player (born 1978)

- Born: 20 January 1978 (age 48) Hamilton, New Zealand
- Height: 1.65 m (5 ft 5 in)
- Weight: 67 kg (148 lb)

Rugby union career
- Position(s): Scrumhalf, Flyhalf
International career
Years	Team	Apps	(Points)
1997–2014	Australia	24	(0)
National sevens team
Years	Team		Comps
- Australia

Tui Ormsby (born 20 January 1978) is a former Australian rugby union player. She represented Australia in four Rugby World Cups – in 1998, 2002, 2010 and 2014.

== Career ==
Ormsby made her international debut in 1997 against the United States at Brisbane.

Ormsby competed in the 1998, 2002, and the 2010 Women's Rugby World Cup where they finished in third place. She became the first Australian player to compete in four Rugby World Cups when she was named in the Wallaroos squad for the 2014 World Cup in France.

She was inducted into the NSW Waratahs inaugural Hall of Fame in June 2024.
