= Chris Ross (rugby union) =

Australian rugby union player

- Born: 10 February 1979 (age 47) Odessa, Texas, United States

Rugby union career
- Position: Lock
Senior career
Years	Team	Apps	(Points)
	Warringah		(0)
International career
Years	Team	Apps	(Points)
2006–2010	Australia	13	(0)

Kelly Christine Ross (born 10 February 1979) is a former Australian rugby union player. She competed for Australia at the 2006 and 2010 Women's Rugby World Cups.

== Early life ==
Ross is originally from Odessa, Texas in the United States. She started playing rugby in college.

== Rugby career ==
Ross represented Australia at the 2006 Women's Rugby World Cup in Canada.

In 2007, she was part of the Wallaroos squad that toured New Zealand and played two tests against the Black Ferns.

Ross was a member of the Australian squad to the 2010 Women's Rugby World Cup in England where they finished in third place.

She was inducted into the NSW Waratahs inaugural Hall of Fame in June 2024.
