= Australia women's national rugby union team =

Australia
- Nickname: Wallaroos
- Emblem: Rugby Australia wallaby graphic
- Union: Rugby Australia
- Head coach: Sione Fukofuka
- Captain: Siokapesi Palu
- Most caps: Michaela Leonard (51)
First colours

World Rugby ranking
- Current: 7 (as of 15 September 2025)
- Highest: 3 (2003–2004)
- Lowest: 8 (July 2025)

First international
- Australia 0–37 New Zealand (Sydney, Australia; 2 September 1994)

Biggest win
- Samoa 0–87 Australia (Apia, Samoa; 8 August 2009)

Biggest defeat
- New Zealand 64–0 Australia (Auckland, New Zealand; 22 July 1995); New Zealand 67–3 Australia (Auckland, New Zealand; 22 October 2016)

World Cup
- Appearances: 8 (first in 1998)
- Best result: 3rd place (2010)
- Website: wallaroos.rugby

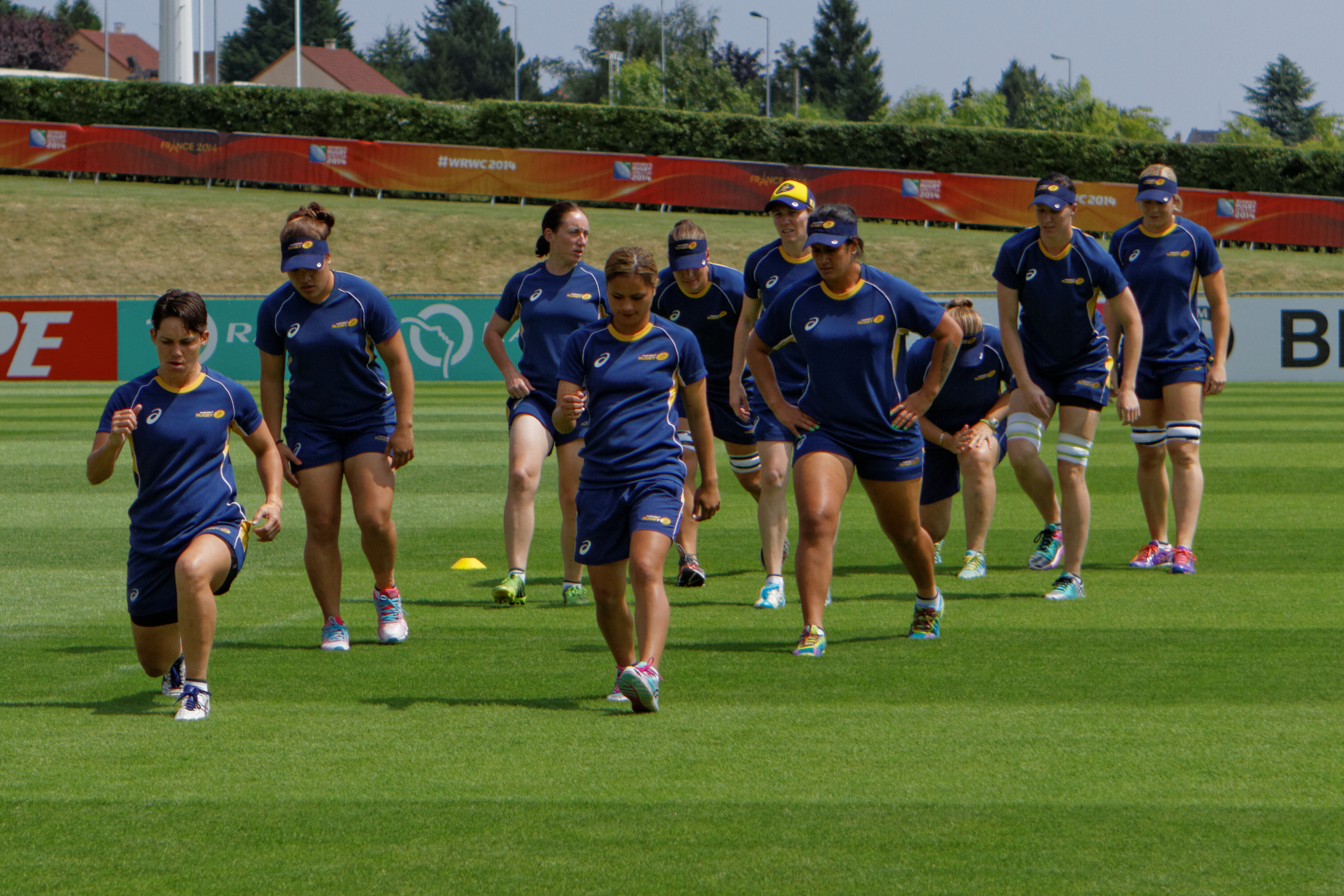
Australia at the 2014 Women's Rugby World Cup.

The Australia women's national rugby union team, commonly called the Wallaroos, represent Australia in women's rugby union. They compete annually in the Pacific Four Series, the Laurie O'Reilly Cup against New Zealand, and have competed at Women's Rugby World Cups since 1998.

In 1992 the first National Women's Tournament was held in Newcastle, NSW. The following year the Australian Women's Rugby Union was established, and it was declared that the national women's team would be called the Wallaroos. The name 'Wallaroos' was chosen by Rugby Australia in honour of Sydney's Wallaroo Football Club, founded in 1870 and Australia's first club dedicated to rugby.

== History ==
=== Origins ===
Although women did not begin playing organised rugby union in Australia until the late decades of the 20th century, they maintained a prominent presence in the sport from its inception in the colonies. Match reports from the early 1870s in Sydney note exceptionally high attendance by female spectators at early Wallaroo FC matches at Moore Park and Parramatta Park, which helped establish rugby's early social standing in Sydney. Women supporters were active in club football and by the 1890s a sizable section of the rising crowd numbers watching rugby union at the Sydney Cricket Ground for major matches.

Women's rugby league matches were played at the Sydney Showground in 1921 and 1930. The earliest recorded women's rugby union match was held in June 1969 in Canberra. A fund-raising event that drew over 1,600 spectators, the two sides were composed of mothers of players from junior rugby union clubs of suburbs Lyneham and Downer.

As the popularity of men's rugby union expanded internationally in the 1970s and 1980s, the appetite for international women's sides grew following the inaugural men's Rugby World Cup in 1987.

Following the first women's rugby union Test match in 1982 and the inaugural Women's Rugby European Cup in 1988 that saw Great Britain, France, the Netherlands and Italy play, the British side was replaced by their regional sides, with England and Wales playing their first matches in 1987, before being joined by Canada and the United States later that year. The Black Ferns followed in 1990 - culminating in the inaugural Women's Rugby World Cup in 1991.

=== Founding of the Wallaroos ===
In Australia, the first National Women's Tournament was held in Newcastle, NSW in 1992 - and finally, in 1993, the Australian Women's Rugby Union was formally established. Per the August 1994 Australian women's team newsletter produced by coach Mick ('Mickey') Willis, the name "Wallaroos" was chosen by the Australian RFU (now Rugby Australia), writing "Identity: Rob has advised the ARFU has decided the Australian Women's Rugby Team will be known and marketed as the:- AUSTRALIAN WALLAROOS. Sounds good hey!!!! - Now we can hop to it!!!!." The team's website records the Wallaroos was named after Wallaroo FC one of the oldest clubs in Australia who originally participated in the Sydney/NSW competition,which later became the Shute Shield. The "Wallaroos" nickname had initially been considered for the Australian men's national rugby union team in 1908, before the squad ultimately voted to adopt "Wallabies" instead.

=== 1990s: early years ===
The Wallaroos played their first international in 1994 against New Zealand. The match was played at North Sydney Oval, and New Zealand won the game 37–0. Karla Clay became the holder of Wallaroos Cap number one, which was retrospectively presented following the commencement of the Wallaroos caps program in 2008.

Initial matches in the opening years would take the form of single annual Test matches against the Black Ferns, marking the start of the Laurie O'Reilly Cup which is contested to this day between the two sides. The Wallaroos would play their first non-Trans Tasman match in 1997, against the United States.

The Wallaroos played 11 Tests during the 1990s, placing fifth at their first World Cup appearance in 1998 in the Netherlands, and winning their first-ever Test match against Ireland in their opening game of that tournament, 21–0.

=== 2000s ===
Progress was slow for the Wallaroos in terms of game time and development throughout the 2000s, with the side playing 16 Test matches during the 2000s, mostly during World Cups.

They replicated their fifth-placed World Cup finish at the 2002 event in Barcelona, Spain - which included inaugural victories against Wales, Scotland, South Africa - and most notably, 1991 World Cup champions the United States.

The side would play no Tests between the 2002 and 2006 World Cups, with the side finishing in 7th at the 2006 World Cup in Canada. Test matches against the Black Ferns would resume in 2007, before, under new coach John Manenti the Wallaroos would pick up their biggest win ever in their history during qualification for the 2010 Rugby World Cup, defeating Samoa 87–0.

=== 2010s: growth and promise, revamped domestic competition ===
Under Manenti, the Wallaroos had their best-ever World Cup to date at the 2010 World Cup in England, finishing runner-up in Pool A but still qualifying for the semi-finals for the first time. While they would fall in their semi-final 15–0 to hosts England, they would go on to defeat France for the first time, prevailing 22–8 at the Twickenham Stoop to finish in third place.

However, after Manenti's departure, the side would not play any further matches for another four years, with Paul Verrell coming in as coach in 2013. In 2014, The Wallaroos played two Test matches in New Zealand against the Black Ferns and North American outfit, Canada. Although losing both of these matches, the Wallaroos took this experience into the 2014 Women's Rugby World Cup.

The Australian team was second in the pool stage behind host team France and was narrowly defeated by the United States in the first playoff, but beat Wales in their last match to finish the tournament in seventh place.

The side would pick up more Test matches throughout the latter half of the 2010s as the women's rugby program continued to expand, with a sixth-placed finish at 2017 Women's Rugby World Cup.

2018 would see the launch of the Super Rugby Women's competition - at the time branded Super W - replacing the National Women's Championship as the Wallaroos prime national competition and aligning with the men's state Super Rugby sides. This would kick-start the growth of the professional women's program over the next decade.

=== 2020s: Full professionalism, WXV success ===
The 2020s would start frustratingly for the Wallaroos, with all planned test matches in 2020 and 2021 cancelled due to the impacts of the COVID-19 pandemic and the planned 2021 World Cup in New Zealand pushed back a year.

However, things would bounce back quickly with World Rugby announcing increased investment in the women's game and the launch of the new tiered WXV competition, plus sanctioning a new tournament in the Pacific, which became the annual Pacific Four Series played between Australia, New Zealand, Canada and the United States.

With 2022 marking the first time in their history the team had a full international calendar, Australia would defeat Fiji in their first clash of 2022, before going on to finish last in the inaugural Pacific Four Series.

Australia played the opening match of the 2021 Rugby World Cup, stunning New Zealand by running in the first three tries and leading at halftime. However, the experience of the hosts - and eventual champions - shone through, going on to win 41–17. Despite this, the Wallaroos reached the quarter-finals after defeating Scotland and Wales in the group stages, before going down to runners-up England 41–5 in Auckland. 2022 would also see Australia announced as host for the 2029 Rugby World Cup.

In 2023, Australia finished third in the Pacific Four Series and qualified for the inaugural WXV 1 tournament. They would go on to enjoy a strong campaign, finishing in third, defeating Six Nations runners-up France and Wales.

In 2024, former England international Joanne Yapp became the first full-time coach for the national side, with substantial growth in the number of Test matches and player contracts at the national and domestic level. The year would be one of ups and downs on the field, picking up the wooden spoon in the 2024 Pacific Four Series.

However, the year culminated in the team's first-ever major title, being crowned 2024 WXV 2 champions after going undefeated in the tournament in South Africa, which also saw the side qualify for the 2025 Rugby World Cup. Following a third-placed finish in the 2025 Pacific Four Series and a drawn home series against Wales, the Wallaroos would go on to qualify for the Rugby World Cup quarterfinals, being knocked out by eventual tournament runners up, Canada.

Wallaroos Assistant Coach, Sam Needs, was appointed as interim Head Coach until the end of the 2026 Pacific Four Series following the departure of Joanne Yapp after the World Cup in England. Following the end of the Series, Rugby Australia appointed successful sevens coach Tim Walsh as Australia's new Director of Women's High Perforance, who subsequently confirmed Sione Fukofuka as Australia's long term head coach to take the side to the 2029 Rugby World Cup and confirmed plans to complete the side's professional transition.

Walsh served as the head of Australia's coaching transition team in an interim capacity for the remainder of 2026, the side producing improved performances during the 2026 WXV Global Series, losing to England and France but finishing the year with a three-match cleansweep of Scotland.

=== Jersey colours and badges (current) ===
The playing kits of the Australian national women's (Wallaroos) and men's teams (Wallabies) are ostensibly identical in their defining features. Both comprise Australia's national sporting colours of green and gold, the Commonwealth Coat of Arms badge (kangaroo and emu) on the left, and the Rugby Australia corporate wallaby logo badge on the right. Despite the women's team nickname, their national jersey does not have a wallaroo emblem, and the team's mascot is Wally the Wallaby, shared with the men's team.

Women's World Rugby Rankings Top 20 rankings as of 2 November 2026
Rank	Change*	Team	Points
1	Steady	England	94.20
2	Steady	New Zealand	93.18
3	Steady	Canada	91.68
4	Steady	France	85.00
5	Steady	Ireland	78.29
6	Steady	United States	77.50
7	Steady	Australia	77.18
8	Steady	Italy	71.99
9	Steady	Scotland	71.25
10	Steady	South Africa	70.76
11	Steady	Wales	70.12
12	Steady	Fiji	66.65
13	Steady	Japan	65.00
14	Steady	Spain	63.22
15	Steady	Samoa	58.31
16	Steady	Netherlands	58.29
17	Steady	Hong Kong	55.72
18	Steady	Russia	55.10
19	Steady	Kazakhstan	53.95
20	Steady	Germany	51.12
*Change from the previous ranking update

=== Rugby World Cup ===
Rugby World Cup
Year	Round	Pos	GP	W	D	L	PF	PA
(Wales) 1991	Did not enter							
(Scotland) 1994	Did not enter							
(Netherlands) 1998	Plate final	5th	5	3	0	2	84	70
(Spain) 2002	Fifth play-off	5th	4	3	0	1	80	41
(Canada) 2006	Plate semi-final	7th	5	2	0	3	114	89
(England) 2010	Third play-off	Third	5	3	0	2	115	67
(France) 2014	Plate semi-final	7th	5	3	0	2	104	49
(Ireland) 2017	Fifth play-off	6th	5	2	0	3	94	149
(New Zealand) 2021	Quarter-final	5th*	4	2	0	2	49	101
(England) 2025	Quarter-final	—	4	1	1	2	116	124
(Australia) 2029	Automatically qualified as host							
(United States) 2033	TBD							
Total	8/10	3rd^{†}	37	19	1	17	756	690
Champion Runner-up Third place Fourth: * Tied placing ^{†} Best placing / Home venue

=== Overall ===
(Full internationals only)

Below is a summary of test matches played by the Wallaroos, updated to 23 October 2026:

Opposition	First	P	W	D	L	%
Canada	2014	9	0	0	9	0%
England	1998	9	0	0	9	0%
Fiji	2022	5	5	0	0	100%
France	1998	7	2	0	5	28.57%
Ireland	1998	5	3	0	2	60%
Japan	2017	4	3	0	1	75%
New Zealand	1994	32	0	0	32	0%
Samoa	2009	2	2	0	0	100%
Scotland	1998	7	7	0	0	100%
South Africa	2006	4	4	0	0	100%
Spain	1998	1	1	0	0	100%
United States	1997	11	3	1	7	27.27%
Wales	2002	10	8	0	2	80%
Summary	1994	105	38	1	66	36.19%

=== Trophies ===
Australia currently contests two trophies with other nations, being the Laurie O'Reilly Cup against New Zealand and the Women's Vuvale Bowl against Fiji. The former has been contested since 1994, with the Wallaroos still to claim the Cup over the Black Ferns. The latter has been contested since 2025, the inaugural fixture in Suva saw the Wallaroos claim the Bowl, winning 43–7.

Trophy	Played against	First contested	Holder	Last won	Trophy leader (wins)
Laurie O'Reilly Cup	New Zealand	2 September 1994	New Zealand	N/A	New Zealand (16)
Women's Vuvale Bowl	Fiji	3 May 2025	Australia	27 March 2026	Australia (2)

=== Honours ===
- WXV
  - WXV2 Winners: 2024

== Players ==
=== Current squad ===
Wallaroos announced a 30-player squad for the upcoming Fijiana Test in March and the 2026 Pacific Four series in April.

Player	Position	Date of birth (age)	Caps	Club/province
Brittany Merlo	Hooker	11 April 1997 (aged 29)	uncapped	(Australia) NSW Waratahs / Sydney University
Tania Naden	Hooker	20 February 1992 (aged 34)	27	(Australia) ACT Brumbies / Uni-North Owls
Adiana Talakai	Hooker	24 February 1999 (aged 27)	21	(Australia) NSW Waratahs / Maroubra Magic
Zoe Elliott	Prop		uncapped	(Australia) Western Force / Cottesloe Rugby
Brianna Hoy	Prop	7 July 2000 (aged 25)	9	(Australia) NSW Waratahs / Coffs Harbour Snappers
Eva Karpani	Prop	18 June 1996 (aged 29)	41	(Australia) Queensland Reds / Southern Suburbs
Bridie O'Gorman	Prop	8 December 1998 (aged 27)	37	(Australia) NSW Waratahs / Sydney University
Faliki Pohiva	Prop	16 April 2001 (aged 24)	8	(Australia) NSW Waratahs / Blacktown Scorpions
Lily Bone	Second row	24 January 2005 (aged 21)	uncapped	(Australia) ACT Brumbies / Orange City
Ashley Fernandez	Second row	24 October 2002 (aged 23)	6	(Australia) ACT Brumbies / Uni-North Owls
Kaitlan Leaney	Second row	10 October 2000 (aged 25)	35	(Australia) NSW Waratahs / SCU Marlins
Michaela Leonard	Second row	6 March 1995 (aged 31)	42	(Australia) Western Force / Tuggeranong Vikings
Tiarah Minns	Second row	6 April 2001 (aged 25)	3	(Australia) Queensland Reds / Melbourne University
Dillyn Blackburn	Back row	2 December 2002 (aged 23)	uncapped	(Australia) Queensland Reds / Gympie Hammers
Emily Chancellor	Back row	20 August 1991 (aged 34)	34	(Australia) NSW Waratahs / Sydney University
Piper Duck	Back row	2 April 2001 (aged 25)	22	(Australia) NSW Waratahs / Tumut Bullettes
Siokapesi Palu	Back row	15 October 1996 (aged 29)	23	(Australia) ACT Brumbies / Rockdale Rangers
Piper Simons	Scrum-half	27 July 2005 (aged 20)	uncapped	(Australia) NSW Waratahs / Manly Mermaids
Samantha Wood	Scrum-half	17 July 2004 (aged 21)	11	(Australia) Western Force / Kalamunda RC
Waiaria Ellis	Fly-half	11 September 2007 (aged 18)	3	(Australia) NSW Waratahs / Blacktown Scorpions
Nicole Ledington	Fly-half	24 April 2003 (aged 22)	uncapped	(Australia) Western Force / Kalamunda RC
Faitala Moleka	Fly-half	29 January 2005 (aged 21)	26	(Australia) ACT Brumbies / Blacktown Scorpions
Georgina Friedrichs	Centre	14 April 1995 (aged 30)	38	(Australia) NSW Waratahs / Wests Bulldogs
Ella Ryan	Centre		uncapped	(Australia) ACT Brumbies / Canberra Royals
Cecilia Smith	Centre	13 March 1994 (aged 32)	28	(Australia) Western Force / Leeton Dianas
Sidney Taylor	Centre	22 August 2002 (aged 23)	uncapped	(Australia) Queensland Reds / University of Queensland
Ava Wereta	Centre	2 June 2006 (aged 19)	uncapped	(Australia) Queensland Reds / Coomera Crushers
Desiree Miller	Wing	13 January 2002 (aged 24)	23	(Australia) NSW Waratahs / Eastern Suburbs
Maya Stewart	Wing	14 March 2000 (aged 26)	22	(Australia) NSW Waratahs / Nelson Bay Gropers
Brooklyn Teki-Joyce	Wing	11 June 2002 (aged 23)	uncapped	(Australia) Western Force / Southern Lions

=== Notable players ===
Cheryl McAfee is the first Wallaroo to be inducted into the World Rugby Hall of Fame in 2021. She led the Australian women's sevens team in the inaugural Women's Rugby World Cup Sevens competition that was held in Dubai in March 2009. Later that year, she was invited by World Rugby to become a member of the bid team that successfully campaigned for the inclusion of rugby sevens in the Olympics. She also captained the Wallaroos from 2006 to 2010, including at the 2010 Rugby World Cup where they achieved their best result of third place.

=== Award winners ===
The following Australia players have been recognised at the World Rugby Awards since 2001:

World Rugby Women's 15s Player of the Year
Year	Nominees	Winners
2007	Sarah Corrigan	Sarah Corrigan
2009	Debby Hodgkinson	Debby Hodgkinson
2010	Nicole Beck	—

World Rugby Women's 15s Breakthrough Player of the Year
Year	Nominees	Winners
2024	Caitlyn Halse	—

World Rugby Women's 15s Try of the Year
Year	Date	Nominee	Match	Tournament	Winner
2022	30 October	Emily Chancellor	vs. England	Rugby World Cup	—
2024	28 September	Maya Stewart	vs. Wales	WXV 2	—

=== Captains ===
Captain	Years	Ref
Siokapesi Palu	2025–	
Emily Chancellor	2025	
Michaela Leonard	2024	
Piper Duck	2023	
Grace Hamilton	2019	
Liz Patu	2018	
Sharni Williams	2017	
Shannon Parry	2017, 2022–23	
Ash Hewson	2016	
Dalena Dennison	2014	
Tui Ormsby	2014	
Chris Ross	2010	
Cheryl Soon	2006–2010	
Selena Worsley	2002	
Louise Ferris	2001	
Nicole Wickert	1998–2000	
Helen Taylor	1994-1995	

== Coaches ==
Updated As Of 23 October 2026

Name	Tenure	Tests	Won	Drawn	Lost	Win%	Ref
Col Spence	1994	1	0	0	1	0%	
Bob Hitchcock	1995–1998	10	3	0	7	30%	
No appointment (Sep 1998–c. Dec 2000)
Don Parry	c. 2000–2002	6	2	0	4	33.33%	
No appointment (Jul 2002–Jun 2005)
Steve Hamson	2005–2008	9	2	0	7	22.22%	
John Manenti	2009–2010	6	4	0	2	66.67%	
No appointment (Oct 2010–Aug 2013)
Paul Verrell	2013–2017	17	5	0	12	29.41%	
Dwayne Nestor	2018–2021	6	2	0	4	33.33%	
Jay Tregonning	2021–2023	19	8	0	11	42.11%	
Joanne Yapp	2023–2025	21	8	1	12	38.1%	
Sam Needs*	2025–2026	4	1	0	3	25%	
Tim Walsh^	2026	6	3	0	3	50%	
Sione Fukofuka	2027–					0%	

* Served as interim head coach ^ Walsh, while working as Rugby Australia's Director of Women's High Performance, served as the head of Australia's coaching transition team in an interim capacity before Fukofuka commenced head coach duties in 2027.

== See also ==
- Laurie O'Reilly Cup
- Super W
- National Women's Rugby Championship – predecessor tournament of Super W
- Australia women's national rugby sevens team
