= 2010 Women's Rugby World Cup Pool A =

Pool A of the 2010 Women's Rugby World Cup was composed of 2006 World Cup winners New Zealand, Australia, South Africa and Wales.

== Australia vs Wales ==
20 August 2010

Australia	26 – 12	Wales
Tries: Nicole Beck 6'; Sharni Williams 16'; Cobie-Jane Morgan 23'; Tricia Brown 79'; Cons: Nicole Beck 6', 16', 23'	Report	Tries: Penalty try 4'; Lowri Harries 70'; Con: Non Evans 4'

Surrey Sports Park, Guildford, South East England
Referee: Javier Mancuso (Argentina)

FB	15	Tricia Brown
RW	14	Kristy Giteau
OC	13	Sharni Williams
IC	12	Cobie-Jane Morgan		(substituted off) 71'
LW	11	Nicole Beck
FH	10	Tui Ormsby		(substituted off) 41'
SH	9	Iliseva Batibasaga	(yellow card) 45'	(substituted off) 54'
N8	8	Alexandra Hargreaves	(yellow card) 34'
OF	7	Shannon Parry		(substituted off) 51'
BF	6	Rebecca Trethowan		(substituted off) 48'	(substituted on) 53'
RL	5	Kate Porter		(substituted off) 79'
LL	4	Chris Ross (c)
TP	3	Lindsay Morgan
HK	2	Silei Poluleuligaga		(substituted off) 79'
LP	1	Caroline Vakalahi	(yellow card) 47'			(substituted off) 60'
Replacements:
HK	16	Margaret Watson		(substituted on) 79'
PR	17	Danielle Meskell		(substituted on) 48'	(substituted off) 53'	(substituted on) 60'
LK	18	Rebecca Clough		(substituted on) 79'
N8	19	Debby Hodgkinson		(substituted on) 51'
SH	20	Cheryl Soon		(substituted on) 54'
CE	21	Cheyenne Campbell		(substituted on) 71'
FH	22	Tobie McGann		(substituted on) 41'
Coach:
(Australia) John Manenti

FB	15	Non Evans
RW	14	Elen Evans
OC	13	Melissa Berry (c)	(substituted off) 35'	(substituted on) 43'
IC	12	Clare Flowers			(substituted off) 56'
LW	11	Mared Evans
FH	10	Naomi Thomas
SH	9	Laura Prosser
N8	8	Jamie Kift
OF	7	Sionead Harries
BF	6	Catrina Nicholas
RL	5	Rachel Taylor
LL	4	Gemma Hallett
TP	3	Catrin Edwards
HK	2	Rhian Bowden	(substituted off) 57'
LP	1	Jenny Davies
Replacements:
HK	16	Lowri Harries	(substituted on) 57'
PR	17	Caryl Thomas
LK	18	Shona Powell Hughes
FL	19	Lisa Newton
SH	20	Amy Day
FH	21	Awen Thomas
CE	22	Ceri Redman	(substituted on) 35'	(substituted off) 43'	(substituted on) 56'
Coach:
(Wales) Jason Lewis

Touch judges:
Joyce Henry (Canada)
Dana Teagarden (United States)
Fourth official:
Dave Broadwell (England)
Fifth official:
Paula Carter (England)

== New Zealand vs South Africa ==
20 August 2010

New Zealand	55 – 3	South Africa
Tries: Carla Hohepa 4', 17', 54'; Fiao'o Fa'amausili 7'; Kelly Brazier 12'; Huriana Manuel 22', 32'; Renee Wickcliffe 44'; Casey Robertson 68'; Cons: Kelly Brazier 5', 8', 13', 23', 69'	Report	Pen: Zandile Nojoko 65'

Surrey Sports Park, Guildford, South East England
Referee: Andrew McMenemy (Scotland)

FB	15	Victoria Grant
RW	14	Carla Hohepa	(substituted off) 71'
OC	13	Huriana Manuel
IC	12	Kelly Brazier
LW	11	Renee Wickcliffe
FH	10	Anna Richards	(substituted off) 52'
SH	9	Emma Jensen	(substituted off) 65'
N8	8	Casey Robertson
OF	7	Justine Lavea	(substituted off) 52'
BF	6	Melissa Ruscoe (c)
RL	5	Victoria Heighway	(substituted off) 56'
LL	4	Vita Robinson
TP	3	Doris Taufateau	(substituted off) 56'
HK	2	Fiao'o Fa'amausili	(substituted off) 65'
LP	1	Ruth McKay
Replacements:
HK	16	Karina Penetito	(substituted on) 65'
PR	17	Melodie Bosman	(substituted on) 56'
LK	18	Monalisa Codling	(substituted on) 56'
FL	19	Joan Sione	(substituted on) 52'
SH	20	Kendra Cocksedge	(substituted on) 65'
FH	21	Rebecca Hull	(substituted on) 52'
WG	22	Halie Hurring	(substituted on) 71'
Coach:
(New Zealand) Brian Evans

FB	15	Zandile Nojoko
RW	14	Yolanda Meiring
OC	13	Lorinda Brown
IC	12	Daphne Scheepers
LW	11	Phumeza Gadu	(substituted off) 53'
FH	10	Zenay Jordaan
SH	9	Saloma Booysen
N8	8	Namhla Siyolo
OF	7	Mandisa Williams (c)
BF	6	Lamla Momoti
RL	5	Dolly Mavumengwana
LL	4	Nolusindiso Booi
TP	3	Cebisa Kula
HK	2	Donna Sidumbu
LP	1	Nedene Botha	(substituted off) 67'
Replacements:
HK	16	Cynthia Poswa
PR	17	Portia Jonga	(substituted on) 67'
PR	18	Laurian Johannes
FL	19	Nombulelo Mayongo
SH	20	Fundiswa Plaatjie
CE	21	Charmaine Kayser	(substituted on) 53'
WG	22	Ziyanda Tywaleni
Coach:
(South Africa) Denver Wannies

Touch judges:
Sébastien Minery (France)
Gabriel Lee (Hong Kong)
Fourth official:
Andrea Ttofa (England)
Fifth official:
Rebecca Patrick (England)

== South Africa vs Wales ==
24 August 2010

South Africa	15 – 10	Wales
Tries: Namhla Siyolo 30'; Charmaine Kayser 40'; Zandile Nojoko 65'	Report	Try: Ceri Redman 78'; Con: Non Evans 79'; Pen: Non Evans 71'

Surrey Sports Park, Guildford, South East England
Referee: Joyce Henry (Canada)

FB	15	Zandile Nojoko
RW	14	Yolanda Meiring
OC	13	Lorinda Brown	(yellow card) 80'
IC	12	Daphne Scheepers		(substituted off) 65'
LW	11	Charmaine Kayser
FH	10	Zenay Jordaan
SH	9	Saloma Booysen
N8	8	Namhla Siyolo	(yellow card) 54'
OF	7	Mandisa Williams (c)
BF	6	Lamla Momoti
RL	5	Dolly Mavumengwana
LL	4	Nowsindiso Booi		(substituted off) 41'
TP	3	Cebisa Kula
HK	2	Donna Sidumbu		(substituted off) 80'
LP	1	Nedene Botha		(substituted off) 80'
Replacements:
HK	16	Cynthia Poswa		(substituted on) 80'
PR	17	Laurian Johannes		(substituted on) 80'
LK	18	Onicca Moaga		(substituted on) 41'
FL	19	Nombulelo Mayongo
SH	20	Fundiswa Plaatjie
WG	21	Phumeza Gadu		(substituted on) 65'
WG	22	Ziyanda Tywaleni
Coach:
(South Africa) Denver Wannies

FB	15	Non Evans
RW	14	Caryl James		(substituted off) 41'
OC	13	Melissa Berry
IC	12	Ceri Redman
LW	11	Mared Evans
FH	10	Naomi Thomas
SH	9	Laura Prosser		(substituted off) 51'
N8	8	Jamie Kift (c)
OF	7	Sioned Harries		(substituted off) 71'
BF	6	Catrina Nicholas	(yellow card) 39'	(substituted off) 73'
RL	5	Rachel Taylor		(substituted off) 47'
LL	4	Gemma Hallett
TP	3	Catrin Edwards
HK	2	Lowri Harries		(substituted off) 80+3'
LP	1	Caryl Thomas
Replacements:
HK	16	Rhian Bowden		(substituted on) 80+3'
LK	17	Shona Powell Hughes		(substituted on) 47'
FL	18	Lisa Newton		(substituted on) 71'
CE	19	Clare Flowers
SH	20	Amy Day		(substituted on) 51'
FH	21	Awen Thomas		(substituted on) 41'
WG	22	Elen Evans		(substituted on) 73'
Coach:
(Wales) Jason Lewis

Touch judges:
Andrew McMenemy (Scotland)
Barbara Guastini (Italy)
Fourth official:
Alan Biggs (England)
Fifth official:
Jane Pizii (England)

== Australia vs New Zealand ==
24 August 2010

Australia	5 – 32	New Zealand
Try: Lindsay Morgan 48'	Report	Tries: Fiao'o Fa'amausili 14'; Carla Hohepa 20'; Justine Lavea 22', 29'; Victoria Blackledge 41'; Huriana Manuel 62'; Con: Rebecca Hull 21'

Surrey Sports Park, Guildford, South East England
Referee: Dana Teagarden (USA)

FB	15	Tricia Brown
RW	14	Cobie-Jane Morgan	(yellow card) 22'
OC	13	Sharni Williams		(substituted off) 40'	(substituted on) 41'	(substituted off) 63'
IC	12	Cheyenne Campbell
LW	11	Nicole Beck
FH	10	Tobie McGann		(substituted off) 74'
SH	9	Cheryl Soon (c)		(substituted off) 74'
N8	8	Debby Hodgkinson
OF	7	Alexandra Hargreaves		(substituted off) 70'
BF	6	Rebecca Trethowan
RL	5	Kate Porter	(yellow card) 59'	(substituted off) 70'
LL	4	Chris Ross
TP	3	Lindsay Morgan
HK	2	Silei Poluleuligaga		(substituted off) 16'
LP	1	Se'ei Sa'u		(substituted off) 63'
Replacements:
HK	16	Margaret Watson		(substituted on) 16'
PR	17	Danielle Meskell		(substituted on) 63'
LK	18	Rebecca Clough		(substituted on) 70'
FL	19	Shannon Parry		(substituted on) 70'
SH	20	Iliseva Batibasaga		(substituted on) 74'
CE	21	Ruan Sims		(substituted on) 40'	(substituted off) 41'	(substituted on) 63'
WG	22	Ashleigh Hewson		(substituted on) 74'
Coach:
(Australia) John Manenti

FB	15	Rebecca Hull
RW	14	Carla Hohepa
OC	13	Huriana Manuel
IC	12	Kelly Brazier
LW	11	Victoria Grant		(substituted off) 71'
FH	10	Anna Richards		(substituted off) 63'
SH	9	Emma Jensen		(substituted off) 71'
N8	8	Linda Itunu		(substituted off) 63'
OF	7	Justine Lavea
BF	6	Melissa Ruscoe (c)
RL	5	Victoria Heighway		(substituted off) 40'	(substituted on) 41'
LL	4	Vita Robinson	(yellow card) 40'			(substituted off) 63'
TP	3	Stephanie Te Ohaere-Fox		(substituted off) 54'
HK	2	Fiao’o Fa’amausili		(substituted off) 71'
LP	1	Melodie Bosman
Replacements:
HK	16	Karina Penetito		(substituted on) 71'
PR	17	Ruth McKay		(substituted on) 54'
LK	18	Monalisa Codling		(substituted on) 40'	(substituted off) 41'	(substituted on) 63'
FL	19	Aroha Savage		(substituted on) 63'
SH	20	Kendra Cocksedge		(substituted on) 71'
CE	21	Trish Hina		(substituted on) 63'
WG	22	Halie Hurring		(substituted on) 71'
Coach:
(New Zealand) Brian Evans

Touch judges:
Kerstin Ljungdahl (Germany)
Debbie Innes (England)
Fourth official:
Ed Turnill (England)
Fifth official:
Catherine Lewis (England)

== New Zealand vs Wales ==
28 August 2010

New Zealand	41 – 8	Wales
Tries: Kelly Brazier 6', 20', 45'; Rebecca Hull 23'; Victoria Grant 49'; Halie Hurring 51'; Cons: Rebecca Hull 24'; Kelly Brazier 50'; Kendra Cocksedge 70'	Report	Try: Caryl James 38'; Pen: Non Evans 12'

Surrey Sports Park, Guildford, South East England
Referee: Clare Daniels (England)

FB	15	Kelly Brazier		(substituted off) 63'
RW	14	Halie Hurring
OC	13	Huriana Manuel		(substituted off) 63'
IC	12	Trish Hina
LW	11	Victoria Grant (c)		(substituted off) 74'
FH	10	Rebecca Hull
SH	9	Kendra Cocksedge
N8	8	Linda Itunu	(yellow card) 34'
OF	7	Joan Sione		(substituted off) 12'	(substituted on) 16'	(substituted off) 54'
BF	6	Casey Robertson		(substituted off) 54'
RL	5	Vita Robinson
LL	4	Monalisa Codling
TP	3	Doris Taufateau
HK	2	Karina Penetito		(substituted off) 65'
LP	1	Ruth McKay		(substituted off) 58'
Replacements:
HK	16	Fiao’o Fa’amausili		(substituted on) 65'
PR	17	Stephanie Te Ohaere-Fox		(substituted on) 58'
FL	18	Melissa Ruscoe		(substituted on) 12'	(substituted off) 16'	(substituted on) 54'
FL	19	Aroha Savage		(substituted on) 54'
SH	20	Emma Jensen		(substituted on) 74'
FH	21	Anna Richards		(substituted on) 63'
WG	22	Carla Hohepa		(substituted on) 63'
Coach:
(New Zealand) Brian Evans

FB	15	Naomi Thomas
RW	14	Caryl James
OC	13	Elen Evans	(yellow card) 16'	(substituted off) 74'
IC	12	Clare Flowers		(substituted off) 64'
LW	11	Non Evans
FH	10	Awen Thomas
SH	9	Amy Day		(substituted off) 72'
N8	8	Melissa Berry (c)
OF	7	Lisa Newton		(substituted off) 72'
BF	6	Jamie Kift
RL	5	Sioned Harries
LL	4	Gemma Hallett		(substituted off) 64'
TP	3	Catrin Edwards		(substituted off) 72'
HK	2	Rhian Bowden
LP	1	Caryl Thomas
Replacements:
HK	16	Lowri Harries		(substituted on) 72'
LK	17	Louise Rickard		(substituted on) 72'
N8	18	Victoria Owens
LK	19	Shona Powell Hughes		(substituted on) 64'
SH	20	Laura Prosser		(substituted on) 72'
CE	21	Ceri Redman		(substituted on) 64'
CE	22	Adi Taviner		(substituted on) 74'
Coach:
(Wales) Jason Lewis

Touch judges:
Sherry Trumbull (Canada)
Kerstin Ljungdahl (Germany)
Fourth official:
Claire Hodnett (England)
Fifth official:
Natalie Amor (England)

== Australia vs South Africa ==
28 August 2010

Australia	62 – 0	South Africa
Tries: Kristy Giteau 5'; Tricia Brown 18'; Debby Hodgkinson 26'; Lindsay Morgan 29', 53'; Alexandra Hargreaves 43'; Sharni Williams 48', 80'; Cobie-Jane Morgan 62'; Cons: Nicole Beck 6', 19', 27', 30', 44', 49', 80'; Pen: Nicole Beck 15'	Report

Surrey Sports Park, Guildford, South East England
Referee: David Keane (Ireland)

FB	15	Tricia Brown	(substituted off) 66'
RW	14	Kristy Giteau
OC	13	Sharni Williams
IC	12	Cheyenne Campbell	(substituted off) 54'
LW	11	Nicole Beck
FH	10	Tobie McGann
SH	9	Cheryl Soon (c)	(substituted off) 66'
N8	8	Debby Hodgkinson	(substituted off) 49'
OF	7	Alexandra Hargreaves	(substituted off) 61'
BF	6	Rebecca Trethowan
RL	5	Kate Porter
LL	4	Chris Ross
TP	3	Lindsay Morgan	(substituted off) 73'
HK	2	Margaret Watson
LP	1	Caroline Vakalahi	(substituted off) 47'
Replacements:
PR	16	Danielle Meskell	(substituted on) 47'
PR	17	Se'ei Sa'u	(substituted on) 73'
FL	18	Megan Shanahan	(substituted on) 49'
FL	19	Shannon Parry	(substituted on) 61'
SH	20	Iliseva Batibasaga	(substituted on) 66'
CE	21	Cobie-Jane Morgan	(substituted on) 54'
WG	22	Ashleigh Hewson	(substituted on) 66'
Coach:
(Australia) John Manenti

FB	15	Zandile Nojoko		(substituted off) 61'
RW	14	Yolanda Meiring		(substituted off) 49'
OC	13	Charmaine Kayser
IC	12	Lorinda Brown (c)
LW	11	Phumeza Gadu	(yellow card) 71'
FH	10	Zenay Jordaan
SH	9	Saloma Booysen		(substituted off) 68'
N8	8	Namhla Siyolo	(yellow card) 18'
OF	7	Nombulelo Mayongo		(substituted off) 75'
BF	6	Lamla Momoti
RL	5	Dolly Mavumengwana
LL	4	Nowsindiso Booi		(substituted off) 47'
TP	3	Laurian Johannes		(substituted off) 66'
HK	2	Donna Sidumbu		(substituted off) 61'
LP	1	Nedene Botha
Replacements:
HK	16	Cynthia Poswa		(substituted on) 61'
PR	17	Portia Jonga		(substituted on) 66'
LK	18	Onicca Moaga		(substituted on) 47'
FL	19	Pulane Motloung		(substituted on) 75'
SH	20	Fundiswa Plaatjie		(substituted on) 68'
WG	21	Ziyanda Tywaleni		(substituted on) 49'
FB	22	Aimee Barrett		(substituted on) 61'
Coach:
(South Africa) Denver Wannies

Touch judges:
Sébastien Minery (France)
Barbara Guastini (Italy)
Fourth official:
Natalie Amor (England)
Fifth official:
Moira Pritchard (England)
