= 2010 Women's Rugby World Cup squads =

2010 Rugby World Cup Squads
Tournament details
- Host nation: 2010 Rugby World Cup Squads
- Dates: 20 August – 5 September
- No. of nations: 12

This article lists the official squads for the 2010 Women's Rugby World Cup in England.

== Pool A ==
=== Australia ===
Wallaroos head coach John Manenti announced a 26-player squad on 14 July 2010, including the majority of Australia's World Cup-winning Women's Sevens team in his squad, five players who return for third WRWC (Ruan Sims, Cheryl Soon, Tui Ormsby, Debby Hodgkinson, Alex Hargreaves) and four rookies (Megan Shanahan, Caroline Vakalahi, Cheyenne Campbell and Shannon Parry).
On 23 August Tui Ormsby was forced to withdraw from the tournament because of a fractured eye socket. Bayswater and Western Australia centre Stacey Kilmister was flown in as a replacement.

Note: Flags indicate national union for the club/province as defined by World Rugby.

Player	Position	Date of birth (age)	Caps	Club/province
Danielle Meskell	Prop	13 November 1973	3	(Australia) Warringah
Lindsay Morgan	Prop	18 October 1979	9	(Australia) Royals
Se'ei Sa'u	Prop	3 November 1974	6	(Australia) West Bulldogs
Caroline Vakalahi	Prop	4 January 1983	0	(Australia) Australian Services Rugby Union
Silei Poluleuligaga	Hooker	8 March 1981	9	(Australia) Wests
Margaret Watson	Hooker	18 December 1986	2	(Australia) University of Newcastle
Rebecca Clough	Lock	14 November 1988	1	(Australia) Cottesloe
Kate Porter	Lock	19 April 1983	7	(Australia) Australian Services Rugby Union
Chris Ross	Lock	10 February 1979	8	(Australia) Warringah
Alexandra Hargreaves	Flanker	13 November 1980	12	(Australia) Tuggeranong Vikings
Shannon Parry	Flanker	27 October 1989	0	(Australia) Easts
Megan Shanahan	Flanker	29 November 1985	0	(Australia) Orange Emus
Rebecca Trethowan	Flanker	8 February 1985	6	(Australia) Narromine Gorillas
Debby Hodgkinson	Number 8	22 November 1980	4	(Australia) Cottesloe
Iliseva Batibasaga	Scrum-half	23 March 1985	5	(Australia) Brothers/Queensland
Cheryl Soon	Scrum-half	23 September 1975	16	(Australia) Warringah
Tobie McGann	Fly-half	4 August 1982	7	(Australia) University of Newcastle
Cheyenne Campbell	Centre	10 September 1986	0	(Australia) Easts/Queensland
Cobie-Jane Morgan	Centre	29 June 1989	1	(Australia) Warringah
Ruan Sims	Centre	4 February 1982	7	(Australia) Warringah
Sharni Williams	Centre	2 March 1988	3	(Australia) Royals
Nicole Beck	Wing	28 May 1988	3	(Australia) University of Sydney
Kristy Giteau	Wing	16 March 1981	1	(Australia) Tuggeranong Vikings
Ashleigh Hewson	Wing	18 December 1979	1	(Australia) University of Sydney
Tui Ormsby	Wing	20 January 1978	16	(Australia) Warringah
Tricia Brown	Fullback	14 March 1979	10	(Australia) University of Queensland

=== New Zealand ===
Black Ferns head coach Brian Evans announced the final squad on 29 June 2010, with Canterbury flanker Melissa Ruscoe named captain, newcomer Trish Hina (who has already represented New Zealand in rugby league) and Monalisa Codling participating in her fourth Women's Rugby World Cup.
A knee injury forced Canterbury utility back Amiria Rule out of Black Ferns. She was replaced by Auckland flyhalf Anna Richards, the most capped New Zealand women's rugby player with 44 caps.

Note: Flags indicate national union for the club/province as defined by World Rugby.

Player	Position	Date of birth (age)	Caps	Club/province
Melodie Bosman (nee Ngatai)	Prop	26 June 1976	8	(New Zealand) Canterbury
Casey Robertson	Number 8	24 February 1981	17	(New Zealand) Canterbury
Doris Taufateau	Prop	29 July 1987	2	(New Zealand) Auckland
Fiao’o Fa’amausili	Hooker	30 September 1980	15	(New Zealand) Auckland
Ruth McKay	Hooker	2 August 1986	5	(New Zealand) Manawatu
Stephanie Ohaere-Fox	Hooker	6 April 1985	4	(New Zealand) Canterbury
Karina Penetito	Hooker	2 February 1986	5	(New Zealand) Auckland
Monalisa Codling	Lock	20 April 1977	26	(New Zealand) Auckland
Victoria Heighway	Lock	28 November 1980	28	(New Zealand) Auckland
Vita Robinson	Lock	20 December 1982	3	(New Zealand) Auckland
Justine Lavea	Flanker	10 July 1984	5	(New Zealand) Auckland
Melissa Ruscoe (c)	Flanker	15 December 1976	17	(New Zealand) Canterbury (c)
Aroha Savage	Flanker	3 November 1990	0	(New Zealand) Auckland
Joan Sione	Flanker	30 January 1986	2	(New Zealand) Auckland
Linda Itunu	Number 8	21 November 1984	14	(New Zealand) Auckland
Kendra Cocksedge	Scrum-half	1 July 1988	4	(New Zealand) Canterbury
Emma Jensen	Scrum-half	25 December 1977	23	(New Zealand) Auckland
Kelly Brazier	Fly-half	28 October 1989	2	(New Zealand) Otago
Rebecca Hull (nee Mahoney)	Fly-half	25 August 1983	9	(New Zealand) Wellington
Anna Richards	Fly-half	3 December 1964	44	(New Zealand) Auckland
Trish Hina	Centre	3 May 1977	0	(New Zealand) Auckland
Halie Hurring	Centre	27 February 1986	2	(New Zealand) Canterbury
Huriana Manuel	Centre	8 August 1986	13	(New Zealand) Auckland
Victoria Grant (nee Blackledge)	Wing	26 August 1982	9	(New Zealand) Auckland
Carla Hohepa	Wing	27 July 1985	6	(New Zealand) Otago
Renee Wickliffe	Fullback	30 May 1987	1	(New Zealand) Auckland

=== South Africa ===
Head coach Denver Wannies confirmed nine players from South Africa's previous IRB Women's Rugby World Cup campaign and ten who took part in 2009 IRB Women's Sevens World Cup in Dubai, while Mandisa Williams was named captain.
Loose forward Nomathamsanqa Faleni was ruled out of the tournament with a serious shoulder injury during a training match in late July and replaced by Golden Lions flanker Pulane Motloung.

Note: Flags indicate national union for the club/province as defined by World Rugby.

Player	Position	Date of birth (age)	Caps	Club/province
Nedene Botha	Prop	19 February 1982		(South Africa) Maties/Western Province
Laurian Johannes	Prop	25 July 1984		(South Africa) UWC/Western Province
Portia Jonga	Prop	4 November 1988		(South Africa) KwaZakele/Border
Cebisa Kula	Prop	19 May 1981		(South Africa) African Bombers/Eastern Province
Cynthia Poswa	Hooker	16 March 1984		(South Africa) UWC/Western Province
Donna Sidumbu	Hooker	18 December 1977		(South Africa) KwaZakele/Eastern Province
Nolusindiso Booi	Lock	29 June 1985		(South Africa) Fort Hare University/Border
Dolly Mavumengwana	Lock	23 December 1976		(South Africa) Varsity Saints/KwaZulu-Natal
Onicca Moaga	Lock	20 February 1988		(South Africa) SANDF
Nombulelo Mayongo	Flanker	26 May 1985		(South Africa) Thabong/Free State
Lamla Momoti	Flanker	27 March 1985		(South Africa) KwaZakele/Eastern Province
Pulane Motloung	Flanker	3 October 1985		(South Africa) Tuks/Golden Lions
Mandisa Williams (c)	Flanker	8 November 1984		(South Africa) Imonti Penguins/Border (c)
Namhia Siyolo	Number 8	23 July 1987		(South Africa) KwaZakele/Eastern Province
Saloma Booysen	Scrum-half	6 April 1987		(South Africa) Aberdeen/Eastern Province
Fundiswa Plaatjie	Scrum-half	4 December 1985		(South Africa) Imonti Penguins/Border
Cherné Roberts	Scrum-half	8 August 1987		(South Africa) Western Province
Zenay Jordaan	Fly-half	4 April 1991		(South Africa) Middelburg Stormers/Eastern Province
Lorinda Brown	Centre	16 December 1983		(South Africa) Middelburg Stormers/Eastern Province
Charmaine Kayser	Centre	27 February 1987		(South Africa) Gardens/Eastern Province
Daphne Scheepers	Centre	2 February 1984		(South Africa) Lilly White/Eastern Province
Phumeza Gadu	Wing	21 June 1985		(South Africa) African Bombers/Eastern Province
Ziyanda Tywaleni	Wing	26 November 1987		(South Africa) Hurricanes/Border
Aimee Barrett	Fullback	27 June 1987		(South Africa) Maties/Western Province
Yolanda Meiring	Fullback	14 August 1983		(South Africa) Tuks/Blue Bulls
Zandile Nojoko	Fullback	1 July 1986		(South Africa) African Bombers/Eastern Province

=== Wales ===
Wales head coach had initially named 23 players, leaving three spots open, but Alex Stokes has been withdrawn. Woodbridge second row and former wing Louise Rickard earned her call-up for her fourth World Cup, while Mel Berry was confirmed captain.
Flanker Catrina Nicholas ruptured the anterior cruciate ligament in her right knee during the second half of the match against South Africa on 24 August. She was replaced by UWIC and Scarlets Number 8 Vici Owens.

Note: Flags indicate national union for the club/province as defined by World Rugby.

Player	Position	Date of birth (age)	Caps	Club/province
Jennifer Davies	Prop	11 March 1982	43	(England) Waterloo/Blues
Catrin Edwards	Prop	15 September 1980	33	(Wales) Cardiff Quins/Scarlets
Lowri Harries	Prop	15 February 1990		(Wales) UWIC/Blues
Caryl Thomas	Prop	19 February 1986		(England) Bath/Dragons
Rhian Bowden	Hooker	16 October 1985	26	(Wales) UWIC/Dragons
Gemma Hallett	Lock	24 August 1981	25	(Wales) Pontyclun/Blues
Shona Powell-Hughes	Lock	8 July 1991		(Wales) Neath Athletic/Ospreys
Louise Rickard	Lock	31 December 1970	110	(England) Woodbridge
Sioned Harries	Flanker	22 November 1989		(Wales) UWIC/Scarlets
Jamie Kift	Flanker	25 November 1978	74	(England) Bristol/Dragons
Lisa Newton	Flanker	14 July 1988	2	(Wales) UWIC/Ospreys
Catrina Nicholas	Flanker	1 December 1982	42	(Wales) Cardiff Quins/Blues
Rachel Taylor	Flanker	13 June 1983	18	(Wales) Cardiff Quins/Ospreys
Melisa Berry (c)	Number 8	16 September 1981	80	(England) Blaydon/Team Northumbria (c)
Amy Day	Scrum-half	7 October 1985	26	(England) Bristol/Dragons
Laura Prosser	Scrum-half	11 May 1982	14	(England) Cardiff Quins/Blues
Elinor Snowsill	Fly-half	27 July 1989	2	(England) Loughborough
Awen Thomas	Fly-half	7 January 1981	53	(Wales) Scarlets
Naomi Thomas	Fly-half	20 November 1981	51	(Wales) Cardiff Quins/Scarlets
Elen Evans	Centre	9 January 1985		(Wales) Dolgellau/Scarlets
Clare Flowers	Centre	20 June 1972	66	(England) Bristol
Ceri Redman	Centre	7 February 1989	5	(Wales) UWIC
Caryl James	Wing	20 July 1980	5	(Wales) Cardiff Quins/Scarlets
Mared Evans	Fullback	14 March 1988	5	(Wales) UWIC/Dragons
Non Evans	Fullback	20 June 1974	84	(Wales) Cardiff Quins/Scarlets

== Pool B ==
=== England ===
England head coach Gary Street announced the squad for Women's Rugby World Cup on 4 May 2010. Bristol No. 8 Catherine Spencer was named captain, while Saracens hooker Amy Garnett is the most experienced player with 86 caps and three rugby world cups behind her. Margaret Alphonsi, Charlotte Barras, Rachael Burford, Tamara Taylor, Amy Turner and Danielle Waterman will also feature in their second successive world cup campaigns. Lichfield's Emily Scarratt is team's youngest member with 16 tries in 18 games.
Richmond centre Claire Allan was replaced by Wasps wing Michaela Staniford because of a knee injury.

Note: Flags indicate national union for the club/province as defined by World Rugby.

Player	Position	Date of birth (age)	Caps	Club/province
Rochelle Clark	Prop	29 May 1981	49	(England) Blaydon/Team Northumbria
Rosemarie Crowley	Prop	16 August 1987	6	(England) Lichfield
Sophie Hemming	Prop	20 June 1980	31	(England) Bristol
Claire Purdy	Prop	1 April 1980	19	(England) Wasps
Amy Garnett	Hooker	31 March 1976	86	(England) Saracens
Emma Croker (nee Layland)	Hooker	29 September 1982	16	(England) Richmond
Rebecca Essex	Lock	16 November 1982	17	(England) Richmond
Joanna McGilchrist	Lock	27 August 1983	35	(England) Wasps
Tamara Taylor	Lock	8 October 1981	36	(England) Darlington Mowden Park Sharks
Margaret Alphonsi	Flanker	20 December 1983	44	(England) Saracens
Heather Fisher	Flanker	13 June 1984	11	(England) Worcester
Sarah Hunter	Flanker	19 September 1985	18	(England) Lichfield
Sarah Beale	Number 8	12 July 1982	18	(England) Lichfield
Catherine Spencer (c)	Number 8	25 May 1979	54	(England) Bristol (c)
La Toya Mason	Scrum-half	21 July 1984	5	(England) Wasps
Amy Turner	Scrum-half	31 July 1984	46	(England) Richmond
Katy McLean	Fly-half	19 December 1985	33	(England) Darlington Mowden Park Sharks
Rachael Burford	Centre	19 August 1986	24	(England) Richmond
Alice Richardson	Centre	14 May 1987		(England) Richmond
Emily Scarratt	Centre	8 February 1990	18	(England) Lichfield
Charlotte Barras	Wing	26 January 1982	43	(England) Saracens
Katherine Merchant	Wing	29 October 1985	26	(England) Worcester
Amber Penrith	Wing	24 July 1980	9	(England) Worcester
Fiona Pocock	Wing	15 June 1989	18	(England) Richmond
Michaela Staniford	Wing	11 January 1987	38	(England) Wasps
Danielle Waterman	Fullback	20 January 1985	35	(England) Worcester

=== Ireland ===
Ireland head coach Phillip Doyle announced the final squad on 12 July 2010, with UL Bohemians and Munster prop Fiona Coghlan named captain, the return of experienced back Lynne Cantwell after a spell in New Zealand and the emerging Nora Stapleton.
Cooke and Ulster forward Lauren Day was forced to withdraw from the Ireland Women's World Cup squad through injury. Her place in the squad was taken by Laura Guest.
Scrum-half Tania Rosser picked up a shoulder injury during the pool game against the United States. Blackrock and Leinster centre Grace Davitt was called up to the squad as a replacement.

Note: Flags indicate national union for the club/province as defined by World Rugby.

Player	Position	Date of birth (age)	Caps	Club/province
Gillian Bourke	Prop	28 August 1984	16	(Ireland) UL Bohemians/Munster
Fiona Coghlan (c)	Prop	3 March 1981	53	(Ireland) UL Bohemians/Leinster (c)
Laura Guest	Prop	24 April 1985	9	(Ireland) Highfield/Munster
Chris Fanning	Hooker	30 December 1975	4	(Ireland) Highfield/Munster
Yvonnne Nolan	Hooker	14 June 1977	20	(Ireland) Blackrock/Leinster
Caroline Mahon	Lock	25 April 1982	34	(Ireland) UL Bohemians/Leinster
Kate O'Loughlin	Lock	8 May 1980	11	(Ireland) Clonmel/Munster
Marie Louise Reilly	Lock	1 April 1980	5	(Ireland) Navan/Leinster
Louise Austin	Flanker	7 December 1981	16	(Ireland) UL Bohemians/Munster
Orla Brennan	Flanker	27 May 1978	41	(Ireland) Blackrock/Leinster
Claire Molloy	Flanker	22 June 1988	6	(England) Bristol/Connacht
Sinead Ryan	Flanker	17 December 1982	17	(Ireland) Blackrock/Leinster
Carol Staunton	Flanker	20 September 1983	4	(Ireland) Galwegians/Connacht
Joy Neville	Number 8	24 July 1983	48	(Ireland) UL Bohemians/Munster
Louise Beamish	Scrum-half	8 April 1980	41	(Ireland) UL Bohemians/Munster
Tania Rosser	Scrum-half	15 April 1978	47	(Ireland) Blackrock/Leinster
Joanne O'Sullivan	Fly-half	20 October 1981	51	(England) Richmond
Helen Brosnan	Centre	6 August 1982	12	(Ireland) Highfield/Munster
Lynne Cantwell	Centre	27 September 1981	57	(Ireland) UL Bohemians
Amy Davis	Centre	28 January 1986	13	(Ireland) Blackrock/Leinster
Shannon Houston	Centre	17 March 1980	25	(Ireland) Blackrock/Leinster
Mairead Kelly	Centre	27 June 1984	7	(Ireland) UL Bohemians/Munster
Jackie Shiels	Centre	1 January 1985	1	(England) Richmond/Leinster
Eliza Downey	Wing	24 April 1985	2	(Ireland) Cooke/Ulster
Nora Stapleton	Wing	5 July 1983	4	(Ireland) Old Belvedere/Leinster
Niamh Briggs	Fullback	30 September 1984	16	(Ireland) Clonmel/Munster

=== Kazakhstan ===
Kazakh head coach Valeriy Popov called up 26 players including Almati flanker Olga Rudoy, the oldest player in 2010 World Cup and team captain.

Note: Flags indicate national union for the club/province as defined by World Rugby.

Player	Position	Date of birth (age)	Caps	Club/province
Natalya Kamendrovskaya	Prop	17 April 1990		(Kazakhstan) Almati
Olga Kumanikina	Prop	14 August 1974		(Kazakhstan) Almati
Olga Nikulich	Prop	9 August 1982		(Kazakhstan) Olymp
Tatyana Pshenichnaya	Prop	1 March 1988		(Kazakhstan) Almati
Irina Radzivil	Prop	27 October 1979		(Kazakhstan) Olymp
Tatyana Ashikhmina	Hooker	11 August 1974		(Kazakhstan) Almati
Farida Kalen	Hooker	25 April 1976		(Kazakhstan) Olymp
Kundyzay Baktybayeva	Flanker	27 March 1989		(Kazakhstan) Olymp
Marianna Balashova	Flanker	1 December 1984		(Kazakhstan) Almati
Svetlana Karatygina	Flanker	11 May 1974		(Kazakhstan) Almati
Alfiya Mustafina	Flanker	14 May 1969		(Kazakhstan) Almati
Olga Rudoy (c)	Flanker	7 January 1963		(Kazakhstan) Almati (c)
Olessya Teryayeva	Flanker	8 August 1985		(Kazakhstan) Olymp
Makhabbat Tugambekova	Flanker	12 July 1976		(Kazakhstan) Olymp
Symbat Zhamankulova	Flanker	16 June 1991		(Kazakhstan) Olymp
Anna Yakovleva	Number 8	10 November 1983		(Kazakhstan) Almati
Anastassiya Khamova	Scrum-half	19 April 1980		(Kazakhstan) Almati
Tatyana Tur	Fly-half	4 December 1974		(Kazakhstan) Almati
Amina Baratova	Centre	10 September 1982		(Kazakhstan) Almati
Svetlana Klyuchnikova	Centre	27 June 1984		(Kazakhstan) Almati
Valentina Nezbudey	Centre	30 January 1970		(Kazakhstan) Almati
Irina Amossova	Wing	13 November 1982		(Kazakhstan) Olymp
Olga Sazonova	Wing	24 January 1986		(Kazakhstan) Almati
Lyudmila Sherer	Wing	14 June 1988		(Kazakhstan) Almati
Irina Adler	Fullback	11 November 1986		(Kazakhstan) Olymp
Aigerym Daurembayeva	Fullback	4 August 1980		(Kazakhstan) Almati

=== United States ===
Women Eagles head coach Katy Flores announced a roster of 26 players on 30 June 2010.

Note: Flags indicate national union for the club/province as defined by World Rugby.

Player	Position	Date of birth (age)	Caps	Club/province
Jamie Burke	Prop	15 October 1980	22	(United States) Beantown
Farrah Douglas	Prop	5 November 1976	9	(United States) Keystone
Lara Vivolo	Prop	4 July 1977	6	(United States) New York
Lisa Butts	Hooker	21 January 1982	6	(United States) Berkeley All Blues
Kittery Wagner	Hooker	15 September 1979	3	(United States) Beantown
Maurin Wallace	Hooker	19 June 1980	15	(United States) Beantown
Sharon Blaney	Lock	16 May 1979	5	(United States) Beantown
Stacey Bridges	Lock	23 April 1988	4	(United States) Texas A&M University
Jillion Potter	Lock	5 July 1986	9	(United States) Minnesota Valkyries
Melanie Denham	Flanker	24 January 1981	8	(United States) Beantown
Phaidra Knight	Flanker	4 July 1974	26	(United States) New York
Beckett Royce	Flanker	11 June 1971	8	(United States) Oregon Sports Union
Kristin Zdanczewicz	Flanker	9 June 1981	13	(United States) Minnesota Valkyries
Blair Groefsema	Number 8	29 October 1983	10	(United States) Berkeley All Blues
Claudia Braymer	Scrum-half	8 September 1980	8	(United States) Albany Sirens
Kim Magrini	Scrum-half	21 May 1982	7	(United States) Keystone
Emilie Bydwell	Centre	1 August 1985	5	(United States) Beantown
Amy Daniels	Centre	8 August 1980	3	(United States) Beantown
Melissa Kanuk	Centre	3 September 1981	10	(United States) Minnesota Valkyries
Lynelle Kugler	Centre	13 November 1981	7	(United States) Twin Cities Amazons
Victoria Folayan	Wing	27 May 1985	4	(United States) Berkeley All Blues
Nathalie Marchino	Wing	27 July 1981	7	(United States) Berkeley All Blues
Vanesha McGee	Wing	21 July 1984	7	(United States) New York
Ashley English	Fullback	27 August 1976	25	(United States) Berkeley All Blues
Ashley Kmiecik	Fullback	18 November 1982	8	(United States) Emerald City Mudhens
Christy Ringgenber	Fullback	13 October 1982	6	(United States) Minnesota Valkyries

== Pool C ==
=== Canada ===
Head coach John Long of Canada's National Senior Women's Team announced his 2010 World Cup roster on 15 July 2010. London Saracens prop Leslie Cripps captained the squad as she did for the past four years, while Gillian Florence made history as one of only two women in the world who have appeared in five World Cups.
On 7 August 2010, lock Marie-Eve Brindamour-Carignan was recovered from a herniated disc and replaced by forward Ashley MacDonald.

Note: Flags indicate national union for the club/province as defined by World Rugby.

Player	Position	Date of birth (age)	Caps	Club/province
Leslie Cripps (c)	Prop	24 September 1977		(England) Saracens (c)
Marlene Donaldson	Prop	29 October 1975		(Canada) Velox Valkyries/British Columbia
Corinne Jacobsen	Prop	10 July 1982		(Canada) Burnaby Lake/British Columbia
Ashley MacDonald	Prop	11 December 1985		(Canada) Lethbridge/Alberta
Tabitha Stavrou	Prop	17 February 1987		(Canada) Markham Irish Canadians/Ontario
Kimberly Donaldson	Hooker	24 August 1983		(Canada) Burnaby Lake/British Columbia
Lesley McKenzie	Hooker	23 December 1980		(Canada) Meraloma
Megan Gibbs	Lock	20 July 1985		(Canada) Markham Irish Canadians/Ontario
Paige Knauf	Lock	18 May 1983		(Canada) Velox Valkyries/British Columbia
Gillian Florence	Flanker	30 April 1975		(Canada) Sainte-Anne-de-Bellevue/Quebec Cariboux
Heather Jaques	Flanker	12 December 1979		(Canada) Capilano/British Columbia
Barbara Mervin	Flanker	1 April 1982		(Canada) Velox Valkyries/British Columbia
Jennifer Kish	Number 8	7 July 1988		(Canada) Leprechaun Tigers/Alberta
Kelly Russell	Number 8	7 December 1986		(Canada) Toronto Nomads/Ontario
Laura Stoughton	Scrum-half	3 March 1978		(Canada) Calgary Irish/Alberta
Julia Sugawara	Scrum-half	27 November 1982		(Canada) Burnaby Lake/British Columbia
Brooke Hilditch	Fly-half	28 June 1980		(Canada) Yeoman/Ontario
Anna Schnell	Fly-half	7 October 1979		(Canada) Burnaby Lake/British Columbia
Mandy Marchak	Centre	24 November 1984		(Canada) Capilano/British Columbia
Cheryl Phillips	Centre	27 March 1982		(Canada) Toronto Scottish/Ontario
Sarah Ulmer	Centre	24 April 1977		(England) Saracens
Maria Gallo	Wing	21 September 1977		(Canada) Burnaby Lake/British Columbia
Heather Moyse	Wing	23 July 1978		(Canada) Toronto Scottish/Ontario
Ashley Patzer	Wing	28 June 1987		(Canada) Lethbridge
Brittany Waters	Wing	23 April 1983		(Canada) Meraloma/British Columbia
Julianne Zussman	Fullback	23 January 1987		(Canada) Town of Mount Royal/Quebec Cariboux

=== France ===
France head coach Christian Galonnier announced the final squad on 12 July 2010.

Note: Flags indicate national union for the club/province as defined by World Rugby.

Player	Position	Date of birth (age)	Caps	Club/province
Céline Barthelemy	Prop	27 December 1981	20	(France) Stade Bordelais
Nadège Labbey	Prop	28 February 1979	22	(France) Ovalie Caennaise
Stéphanie Loyer	Prop	19 October 1975	15	(France) AC Bobigny 93
Gaëlle Mignot	Hooker	26 February 1987	0	(France) Montpellier HRC
Clémence Ollivier	Hooker	20 July 1984	13	(France) Stade Rennais
Laetitia Salles	Hooker	29 October 1982	61	(France) USA Perpignan
Clémence Audebert	Lock	2 September 1981	7	(France) USA Perpignan
Cyrielle Bouisset	Lock	5 April 1986	21	(France) USA Perpignan
Hasna Rhamouni	Lock	23 April 1979	8	(France) CSM Gennevilliers
Manon André	Flanker	22 September 1986	11	(France) Saint Orens
Aida Ba	Flanker	27 June 1983	5	(France) AC Bobigby 93
Claire Canal	Flanker	9 July 1985	20	(France) USA Perpignan
Marie-Charlotte Hebel	Flanker	27 August 1984	24	(Spain) GEIEG Girona
Amandine Vaupre	Flanker	22 April 1982	18	(France) Ovalie Caennaise
Sandra Rabier	Number 8	1 March 1985	26	(France) Ovalie Caennaise
Stéphanie Provost	Scrum-half	27 May 1973	73	(France) Ovalie Caennaise
Marie-Alice Yahe	Scrum-half	10 July 1984	13	(France) USA Perpignan
Aurélie Bailon	Fly-half	16 January 1987	23	(France) USA Perpignan
Audrey Parra	Fly-half	16 November 1987	0	(France) Montpellier HRC
Sandrine Agricole	Centre	13 March 1980	44	(France) Stade Rennais
Lucille Godiveau	Centre	18 April 1987	17	(France) Stade Rennais
Céline Allainmat	Wing	7 August 1982	34	(France) Stade Rennais
Fanny Horta	Wing	22 January 1986	25	(France) USA Perpignan
Caroline Ladagnous	Wing	22 September 1988	19	(France) RC Lons
Anaïs Lagougine	Wing	24 September 1981	13	(France) Montpellier HRC
Elodie Poublan	Fullback	13 April 1989	16	(France) Montpellier HRC

=== Scotland ===
A squad of 26 has been announced by head coach Gary Parker on 22 June 2010, including Scotland's most capped rugby player Donna Kennedy (110 caps) and Suzi Newton, after a long-term injury.

Note: Flags indicate national union for the club/province as defined by World Rugby.

Player	Position	Date of birth (age)	Caps	Club/province
Beth Dickens	Prop	6 March 1980	29	(Scotland) Murrayfield Wanderers
Heather Lockhart	Prop	9 June 1972	41	(Scotland) Hillhead Jordanhill
Rosalind Murphy	Prop	3 July 1989	4	(Scotland) Edinburgh University
Alison MacDonald	Hooker	17 October 1983	4	(Scotland) RHC Cougars
Sarah-Louise Walker	Hooker	31 May 1982	29	(Scotland) Watsonians
Gillian McCord	Lock	8 June 1977	41	(Scotland) RHC Cougars
Louise Moffat	Lock	24 September 1982	28	(Scotland) Murrayfield Wanderers
Lindsay Wheeler	Lock	8 April 1984	36	(England) Blaydon/Team Northumbria
Susie Brown	Number 8	13 May 1981	39	(England) Richmond
Tess Forsberg	Flanker	26 December 1981	0	(Scotland) Murrayfield Wanderers
Keri Holdsworth	Flanker	12 October 1977	14	(Scotland) Watsonians
Donna Kennedy	Flanker	16 February 1972	110	(England) Worcester
Lynne Reid	Flanker	1 January 1977	50	(Scotland) RHC Cougars
Ruth Slaven	Flanker	15 June 1986	16	(Scotland) Murrayfiled Wanderers
Louise Dalgliesh	Scrum-half	29 April 1982	37	(Scotland) RHC Cougars
Sarah Gill	Scrum-half	11 October 1983	23	(Scotland) RHC Cougars
Tanya Griffith	Fly-half	5 May 1988	23	(Scotland) RHC Cougars
Veronica Fitzpatrick	Centre	4 January 1980	56	(Scotland) RHC Cougars
Stephanie Johnston	Centre	29 November 1985	3	(Scotland) Hillhead Jordanhill
Erin Kerr	Centre	29 November 1982	39	(England) London Wasps
Suzi Newton	Centre	9 July 1983	34	(England) Blaydon/Team Northumbria
Linsey Douglas	Wing	6 October 1980	28	(England) London Wasps
Katy Green	Wing	26 April 1985	2	(Scotland) Murrayfiled Wanderers
Celia Hawthorn	Wing	6 November 1989	7	(Scotland) Edinburgh University
Nicola Halfpenny	Fullback	24 June 1989	3	(Scotland) Melrose
Lucy Millard	Fullback	23 October 1983	53	(England) Blaydon/Team Northumbria

=== Sweden ===
Sweden head coach Jonas Ahl announced the final squad on 11 July 2010.

Note: Flags indicate national union for the club/province as defined by World Rugby.

Player	Position	Date of birth (age)	Caps	Club/province
Henrietta Högberg	Prop	16 January 1980		(Sweden) Göteborg
Jennie Öhman	Prop	29 July 1970		(Sweden) NRK Troján
Susanne Olovsson	Prop	9 November 1972		(Malaysia) RSC Dingoes
Viktora Svangren	Prop	22 November 1983		(Sweden) Stockholm Exiles
Sara Åkerman	Hooker	13 May 1980		(Sweden) Pingvin
Erica Storckenfeldt	Hooker	20 June 1982		(Sweden) Göteborg
Sofi Björkman	Lock	21 January 1984		(Sweden) Stockholm Exiles
Katarina Boman	Lock	12 December 1973		(Sweden) Uppsala
Madeleine Lahti	Lock	29 January 1981		(Sweden) Enköping
Erika Andersson	Flanker	11 April 1986		(Sweden) Stockholm Exiles
Jessica Berntsson	Flanker	6 November 1984		(Sweden) Göteborg
Elisabeth Österberg	Flanker	9 October 1977		(Sweden) Uppsala
Anna Lena Swartz	Flanker	29 December 1972		(Sweden) NRK Troján
Anna Larsson	Number 8	26 August 1975		(Sweden) Pingvin
Elisabeth Ygge	Number 8	2 February 1987		(Sweden) Stockholm Exiles
Frida Ryberg	Scrum-half	14 July 1978		(Sweden) Stockholm Exiles
Sofia Torstensson	Scrum-half	26 September 1988		(Sweden) Uppsala
Ulrika Andersson Hall	Fly-half	7 January 1973		(Sweden) Göteborg
Ninni Giebat Johansson	Centre	5 September 1990		(Sweden) Vänersborg
Jessica Melin	Centre	25 September 1984		(Sweden) Stockholm Exiles
Johanna Norberg	Centre	26 September 1984		(Sweden) Vänersgorg
Karin Hedlund	Wing	4 October 1979		(Sweden) Malmö
Jennifer Lindholm	Wing	17 June 1990		(Sweden) Enköping
Charlotta Westin Vines	Wing	3 May 1975		(Sweden) Uppsala
Anna Holmström	Fullback	21 November 1981		(Sweden) Göteborg
Lina Norman	Fullback	25 January 1981		(Sweden) Malmö
