= 2010 Women's Rugby World Cup final =

Rugby union match

2010 Women's Rugby World Cup Final
- Event: 2010 Women's Rugby World Cup
New Zealand	England
(New Zealand)	(England)
13	10
- Date: 5 September 2010
- Venue: Twickenham Stoop, Twickenham, London
- Referee: Sarah Corrigan (Australia)
- Attendance: 13,253

The 2010 Women's Rugby World Cup Final was a rugby union match that determined the 2010 Women's Rugby World Cup winner. The match occurred on 5 September 2010 at the Twickenham Stoop in Twickenham, London and was contested between New Zealand and England for a third time. It was England's record fifth appearance in a Final and New Zealand's fourth. New Zealand made history with their fourth back-to-back title after defeating England in a tightly contested match.

== Route to the final ==
New Zealand
Round
England
Opponent
Result
Pool stage
Opponent
Result
South Africa
55–3
Match 1
Ireland
27–0
Australia
32–5
Match 2
Kazakhstan
82–0
Wales
41–8
Match 3
United States
37–10
Pool A

Po	Nation	P	W	D	L	PF	PA	PD	TF	TA	BP	TP
1	New Zealand	3	3	0	0	128	16	+112	22	2	3	15
2	Australia	3	2	0	1	93	44	+49	14	8	2	10
3	South Africa	3	1	0	2	18	127	-109	3	19	0	4
4	Wales	3	0	0	3	30	82	-52	4	14	1	1

Final standing
Pool B

Po	Nation	P	W	D	L	PF	PA	PD	TF	TA	BP	TP
1	England	3	3	0	0	146	10	+136	22	2	3	15
2	Ireland	3	2	0	1	59	42	+17	11	6	2	10
3	United States	3	1	0	2	73	59	+14	11	10	1	5
4	Kazakhstan	3	0	0	3	3	170	-167	0	26	0	0

Opponent
Result
Knockout stage
Opponent
Result
France
45–7
Semi-finals
Australia
15–0

New Zealand was placed in Pool A with South Africa, Australia and Wales. England was in Pool B along with Ireland, Kazakhstan and the United States. New Zealand started their World Cup campaign with a 55–3 trouncing of South Africa. Carla Hohepa scored a hat-trick and Kelly Brazier slotted in five conversions. South Africa's only points came by way of a penalty in the 66th minute. Australia were New Zealand's next opponents in the pool; Wallaroos Prop Lindsay Morgan shocked the defending champions by scoring first in the 8th minute. Despite playing into the elements for most of the first half, the Black Ferns managed to go into halftime 22–5. They only managed 10 points in the second half as they defeated Australia 32–5. Kelly Brazier's hat-trick helped New Zealand thrash Wales 41–8 in their last pool game. New Zealand met France in the semi-final, they scored five tries with three successful conversions in the first half. France only answer came from hooker, Laetitia Salles, who scored a late first half try just before the break and begin halftime 31–7. New Zealand scored only 14 points in the second half and ended the game 45–7.

England beat Ireland 27–0 in their first pool match as they scored four unanswered tries. In their second pool game, Fiona Pocock and Charlotte Barras each scored a hat-trick as England ran in 14 tries as they heavily defeated Kazakhstan 82–0. Inaugural champions, the United States were England's last pool opponents. Danielle Waterman scored a brace of tries and four other try scorers also crossed the try line to help England beat USA 37–10. England met Australia who had reached the semi-finals for the first time. It was a hard-fought match but England triumphed in the end, 15–0, as they booked a final showdown with New Zealand.

== Match ==
5 September 2010

New Zealand	13–10	England
Try: Hohepa 33'; Con: Brazier 34'; Pen: Brazier 56', 66'	Report	Try: Barras 61'; Con: McLean 62'; Pen: McLean 43'

Twickenham Stoop
Attendance: 13,253
Referee: (Australia) Sarah Corrigan

FB	15	Victoria Grant
RW	14	Carla Hohepa
OC	13	Huriana Manuel
IC	12	Kelly Brazier
LW	11	Renee Wickcliffe
FH	10	Anna Richards
SH	9	Emma Jensen
N8	8	Casey Robertson
OF	7	Justine Lavea
BF	6	Melissa Ruscoe (c)
RL	5	Victoria Heighway
LL	4	Vita Robinson
TP	3	Melodie Bosman
HK	2	Fiao'o Fa'amausili
LP	1	Ruth McKay
Replacements:
HK	16	Karina Penetito
PR	17	Stephanie Te Ohaere-Fox
LK	18	Linda Itunu
FL	19	Joan Sione
SH	20	Kendra Cocksedge
FH	21	Rebecca Hull
CE	22	Trish Hina
Coach:
(New Zealand) Brian Evans

FB	15	Danielle Waterman
RW	14	Charlotte Barras
OC	13	Emily Scarratt
IC	12	Rachael Burford
LW	11	Katherine Merchant
FH	10	Katy McLean
SH	9	Amy Turner
N8	8	Catherine Spencer (c)
OF	7	Margaret Alphonsi
BF	6	Sarah Hunter
RL	5	Joanna McGilchrist
LL	4	Tamara Taylor
TP	3	Sophie Hemming
HK	2	Amy Garnett
LP	1	Rochelle Clark
Replacements:
HK	16	Emma Croker
PR	17	Claire Purdy
PR	18	Rebecca Essex
LK	19	Sarah Beale
SH	20	La Toya Mason
FH	21	Alice Richardson
CE	22	Amber Penrith
Coach:
(England) Gary Street

=== Summary ===
England spent the first ten minutes of the game stuck in their own half but did not concede a single point. Anna Richards was sin-binned in the 22nd minute for killing the ball and was later joined by Mel Bosman 7 minutes later for the same offence, however England could not capitalize on the fact that New Zealand were down to 13 players. Winger Carla Hohepa eventually broke through the English defence and scored for the Black Ferns, a successful conversion by Kelly Brazier put them in the lead 7–0 at half-time.

Three minutes into the second half Katy McLean kicked a penalty and reduced their deficit to 5 points. 13 minutes later Brazier kicked another penalty and increased New Zealand's lead to 10–3. New Zealand captain Melissa Ruscoe was sin-binned in the 57th minute, this time England took advantage of the Black Ferns misfortune as Charlotte Barras scored moments later and a conversion to Katy McLean leveled the game at 10–10. Kelly Brazier's penalty in the 66th minute helped New Zealand secure their fourth World title as they edged England 13–10.
