= List of Australia women's national rugby union team player records =

Australia, also known as the Wallaroos, played their first international in 1994 against New Zealand. They compete annually in the Pacific Four Series, and the Laurie O'Reilly Cup against New Zealand. They have also competed at Women's Rugby World Cups since the 1998. The records listed below only include performances in Test matches.

- Current as of Australia vs Canada, 13 September 2025. Statistics include officially capped matches only with current Wallaroos indicated in **bold type**.

== Player records ==
=== Most caps ===
#	Player	Position	Career span	Tests
1	**Ashley Marsters**	Hooker	2014–present	**45**
2	Trilleen Pomare	Fly-half	2017–2025	**43**
3	**Michaela Leonard**	Lock	2019–present	**42**
4	**Asoiva Karpani**	Prop	2019–present	**41**
5	**Georgina Friedrichs**	Centre	2022–present	**38**

=== Most tries ===
#	Player	Position	Career span	Tests	Points	Tries	Avg
1	**Maya Stewart**	Outside back	2022–present	22	80	**16**	0.73
2	**Desiree Miller**	Wing	2023–present	23	77	**15**	0.65
3	Tricia Brown	Fly-half	2006–2014	21	70	**14**	0.67
3	**Asoiva Karpani**	Prop	2019–present	41	70	**14**	0.34
4	**Ashley Marsters**	Hooker	2014–present	45	65	**13**	0.29

=== Most points ===
#	Player	Career span	Points	Tests	Tries	Conv	Pens	Drop	Avg
1	**Lori Cramer**	2019–present	**87**	31	5	22	6	0	2.81
2	**Maya Stewart**	2022–present	**80**	22	16	0	0	0	3.64
3	**Desiree Miller**	2023–present	**77**	23	15	1	0	0	3.35
4	Tricia Brown	2006–2014	**70**	21	14	0	0	0	3.33
4	**Asoiva Karpani**	2019–present	**70**	41	14	0	0	0	1.71

== Match records ==
=== Points ===
#	Player	Position	Pts	Tries	Con	Pens	Drop	Result	Opposition	Date	Ref
1	Ruan Sims	Centre	**20**	4	0	0	0	68–12	South Africa	31 August 2006	
1	**Desiree Miller**	Wing	**20**	4	0	0	0	64–5	Fiji	6 July 2024	
3	Nicole Beck	Wing	**17**	0	7	1	0	62–0	South Africa	28 August 2010	
4	Ashleigh Hewson	Fullback	**16**	1	1	3	0	26–3	South Africa	1 August 2014	
4	**Lori Cramer**	Fullback	**16**	1	4	1	0	46–3	Japan	19 July 2019	

=== Tries ===
#	Player	Position	Tries	Result	Opposition	Date	Ref
1	Ruan Sims	Centre	4	68–12	South Africa	31 August 2006	
1	**Desiree Miller**	Wing	4	64–5	Fiji	6 July 2024	
3	Rebecca Trethowan	Flanker	3	87–0	Samoa	8 August 2009	
3	Grace Hamilton	Flanker	3	46–3	Japan	19 July 2019	
3	**Maya Stewart**	Wing	3	58–17	United States	8 July 2023	
3	**Asoiva Karpani**	Prop	3	29–20	France	28 October 2023	

== Youngest players ==
#	Player	Age on debut	D.O.B.	Debut	Opposition
1	**Caitlyn Halse**	**17 years, 242 days**	19 September 2006	17 May 2024	United States
2	**Waiaria Ellis**	**17 years, 305 days**	11 September 2007	12 July 2025	New Zealand
3	**Ruby Anderson**	**18 years, 10 days**	8 May 2007	17 May 2025	United States
4	Sharyn Williams	**18 years,** **44 days**	20 July 1976	2 September 1994	New Zealand

== Oldest players ==
#	Player	Age in final test	D.O.B.	Last match	Opposition
1	Danielle Meskell	**42 years, 348 days**	13 November 1973	26 October 2016	New Zealand
2	Louise Burrows	**39 years, 168 days**	11 March 1978	26 August 2017	Canada
3	Ashleigh Hewson	**37 years, 234 days**	18 December 1979	9 August 2017	Ireland
4	Iliseva Batibasaga	**37 years, 221 days**	23 March 1985	30 October 2022	England
5	Lisa Fiaola	**36 years, 329 days**	25 November 1970	20 October 2007	New Zealand
