= Giteau =

Giteau is a French surname that may refer to:

- Kasey Giteau (born 1982), Australian swimmer
- Kristy Giteau (born 1981), Australian rugby union player
- Madeleine Giteau (1918–2005), French historian
- Matt Giteau (born 1982), Australian rugby union player, brother of Kristy
  - Giteau's law introduced in 2015 by the Australian Rugby Union, named after Matt
- Ron Giteau (born 1955), Australian rugby league footballer, father of Matt and Kristy

== See also ==
- Guiteau
