= Clémence Ollivier =

French rugby union player

- Born: 20 July 1984 (age 42)
- Height: 1.65 m (5 ft 5 in)
- Weight: 70 kg (150 lb; 11 st 0 lb)

Rugby union career
- Position: Hooker
Senior career
Years	Team	Apps	(Points)
- Stade Rennais
International career
Years	Team	Apps	(Points)
- France

Clémence Ollivier (born 20 July 1984) is a French rugby union player. She represented France at the 2006 and 2010 Women's Rugby World Cup's.
