= Ron Giteau =

Australian rugby league footballer

Personal information
- Full name: Ron Giteau
- Born: 31 May 1955 (age 71)

Playing information
- Height: 180 cm (5 ft 11 in)
- Weight: 90 kg (14 st 2 lb)
- Position: Centre
Club
Years	Team	Pld	T	G	FG	P
1974–80	Western Suburbs	102	41	152	2	429
1981–82	Eastern Suburbs	46	11	141	2	319
1983–86	Canberra Raiders	78	14	234	3	527
	Total	226	66	527	7	1275
- Relatives: Matt Giteau (son); Kristy Giteau (daughter)

Ron Giteau (born 31 May 1955) is an Australian former professional rugby league footballer. A prolific point-scoring centre, he was captain of the Canberra Raiders team in the New South Wales Rugby Football League premiership. Giteau also played for Western Suburbs and Eastern Suburbs.

He was a Wests junior graded from the Enfield Federals junior club in 1974.

Ron Giteau is the father of former Australian rugby union player, Matt Giteau, Australia women's dual-code rugby international Kristy Giteau and Canberra Raiders NSW Cup side coach Justin Giteau

== Sources ==
- Gary Lester, ed. (1983). The Sun Book of Rugby League – 1983. Sydney, New South Wales: John Fairfax Marketing. p. 16. ISBN 0-909558-83-3.
- Alan Whiticker & Glen Hudson (2007). The Encyclopedia of Rugby League Players. Wetherill Park, New South Wales: Gary Allen Pty Ltd. p. 195. ISBN 978-1-877082-93-1.

Sporting positions
Preceded by Allan McMahon	Canberra Raiders captain 1984-85	Succeeded by Dean Lance
