= Claire Purdy =

English rugby union player

- Born: 1 April 1980 (age 46)
- Height: 1.64 m (5 ft 4 1/2 in)
- Weight: 89 kg (196 lb; 14 st 0 lb)

Rugby union career
- Position: Prop
Senior career
Years	Team	Apps	(Points)
- Wasps RFC
International career
Years	Team	Apps	(Points)
	England	41	
Medal record
Representing England
Women's rugby union
Rugby World Cup
Gold medal – first place	2014 France	Team competition
Silver medal – second place	2010 England	Team competition

Claire Purdy (born 1 April 1980) is an English female rugby union player. She represented England at the 2010 Women's Rugby World Cup. She was also named in the squad to the 2014 Women's Rugby World Cup.
