= Doris Taufateau =

- Born: 29 July 1987 (age 39)
- Height: 1.75 m (5 ft 9 in)
- Weight: 109 kg (240 lb; 17 st 2 lb)

Rugby union career
- Position: Prop
Provincial / State sides
Years	Team	Apps	(Points)
2007–Present	Auckland	49	(30)
International career
Years	Team	Apps	(Points)
2008–2011	New Zealand	5	(0)
Medal record
Representing New Zealand
Women's rugby union
Rugby World Cup
Gold medal – first place	2010 England	Team competition

Doris Taufateau (born 29 July 1987) is a female rugby union player. She competed for New Zealand internationally and for Auckland at provincial level. She was a member of the 2010 Women's Rugby World Cup winning squad.

== Rugby career ==
Taufateau made her international debut for the Black Ferns at the age of 19, it was against Australia in Canberra in 2008. In 2009, she injured her ACL.

She was a member of the Black Ferns champion side that won the 2010 Women's Rugby World Cup .

== Personal life ==
Taufateau completed a bachelor's degree in Physical Education in 2013. She currently teaches at the high school she attended as a student, Tamaki College.
