= Liza Mihinui =

New Zealand rugby union player

- Born: 20 November 1960 (age 65)
- Notable relative: Huriana Manuel (daughter)

Rugby union career
- Position: Hooker
Amateur team(s)
Years	Team	Apps	(Points)
	Auckland Marist		(0)
Provincial / State sides
Years	Team	Apps	(Points)
	Auckland		(0)
International career
Years	Team	Apps	(Points)
1994	New Zealand	1	(0)

Liza Mihinui (born 20 November 1960) is a former New Zealand rugby union player. She played for the Black Ferns on 29 August 1994 against a New South Wales side at Richmond.

Mihinui is the mother of another Black Fern, Huriana Manuel. They were the first mother and daughter Black Ferns after Manuel's debut in 2005.
