= Anaïs Lagougine =

French rugby union player

- Born: 24 September 1981 (age 45)

Rugby union career
- Position: Wing
International career
Years	Team	Apps	(Points)
	France	16	
National sevens team
Years	Team		Comps
- France

Anaïs Lagougine (born 24 September 1981) is a French rugby union player. She represented France at the 2010 Women's Rugby World Cup. She was a member of the 2013 Rugby World Cup Sevens squad.
