= Joan Sione =

- Born: 30 January 1986 (age 40)
- Height: 1.56 m (5 ft 1 1/2 in)
- Weight: 86 kg (190 lb; 13 st 8 lb)

Rugby union career
- Position: Loose forward
Provincial / State sides
Years	Team	Apps	(Points)
2004	Auckland		(0)
International career
Years	Team	Apps	(Points)
2005–2010	New Zealand	6	(5)
Medal record
Representing New Zealand
Women's rugby union
Rugby World Cup
Gold medal – first place	2010 England	Team competition

Joan Sione (born 30 January 1986) is a New Zealand rugby union player. She represented New Zealand and Auckland. She was a member of the Black Ferns Champion, 2010 Rugby World Cup squad.

== Rugby career ==
Sione made her international debut for the Black Ferns in their Canada Cup match against Scotland on 29 June 2005 at Ottawa. She also appeared in the pool stage match against Canada.

In October 2005, She withdrew from the Black Ferns squad ahead of their test against England due to injury. She was replaced by her Auckland team-mate, Justine Lavea.

Sione was a member of the 2010 Women's Rugby World Cup winning squad. She started in the pool game against Wales. She scored the final try in the semi-final against France that sealed the Black Ferns a place in the final with England.

In 2011, She missed selection for the Black Ferns tour of England because of injury.
