= Matt Giteau =

Australian rugby union player (born 1982)

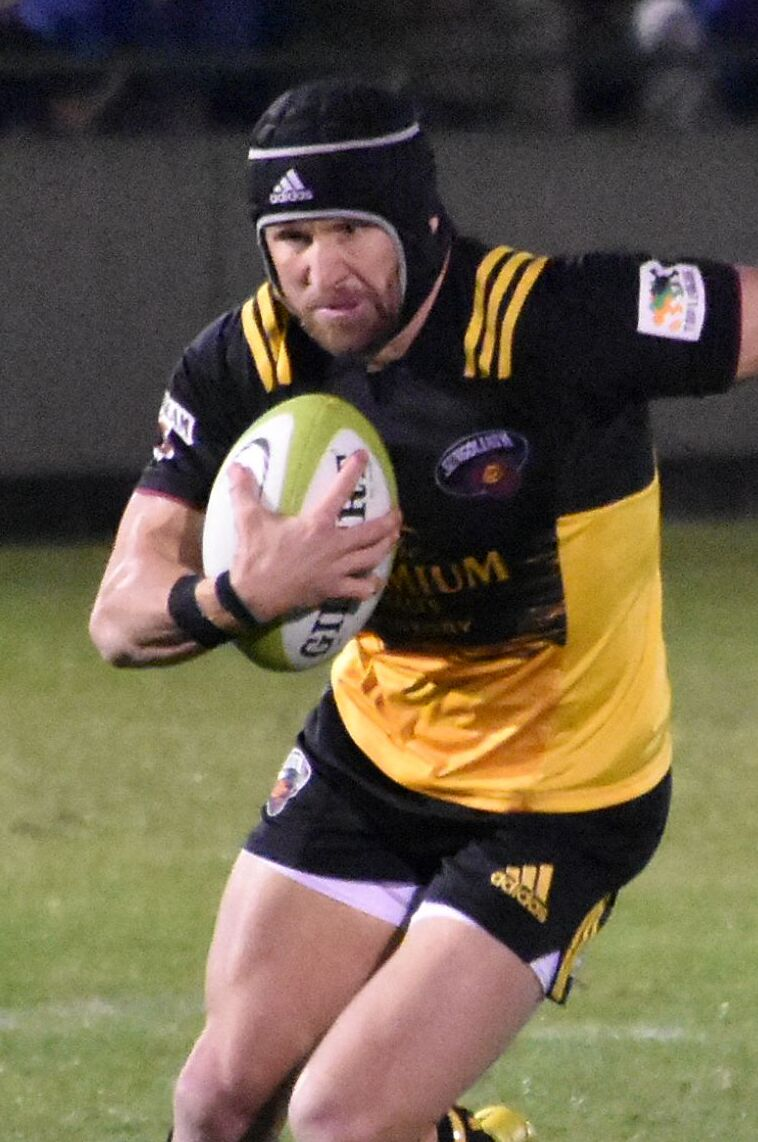
- Giteau with the Suntory Sungoliath in 2018
- Born: Matthew James Giteau; 29 September 1982 (age 44) Sydney, New South Wales, Australia
- Height: 1.78 m (5 ft 10 in)
- Weight: 85 kg (13 st 5 lb; 187 lb)
- School: St Edmund's College, Canberra
- Notable relatives: Ron Giteau (father); Bianca Giteau (wife); Kristy Giteau (sister); Lance Franklin (brother-in-law)

Rugby union career
- Position(s): Centre, Fly-half
Senior career
Years	Team	Apps	(Points)
2011–2017	Toulon	121	(321)
2017–2020	Suntory Sungoliath	33	(242)
2021	LA Giltinis	13	(98)
2024	San Diego Legion	5	(35)
- Correct as of 28 June 2024
Super Rugby
Years	Team	Apps	(Points)
2001–2006	Brumbies	40	(151)
2007–2009	Western Force	37	(296)
2010–2011	Brumbies	27	(307)
International career
Years	Team	Apps	(Points)
2000	Australian Schoolboys		
2002	Australia U21	4	(15)
2002–2016	Australia	103	(698)
- Correct as of 20 August 2016
National sevens team
Years	Team		Comps
2000–2001	Australia		

Matthew James Giteau (born 29 September 1982) is an Australian former professional rugby union player.

Giteau played as a utility back. His usual positions were inside centre and fly-half, although he started his career as a scrum-half. He played for the Wallabies for the first time in 2002 against England at Twickenham and was a nominee for the International Rugby Board Player of the Year in 2004. He appeared in 104 Super Rugby matches. During his career he won 103 Test caps for Australia. He was re-selected to the national team after several years' absence under a rule known as Giteau's law.

== Personal life ==
Giteau attended St Edmund's College, Canberra, which has produced other Wallabies including George Gregan, Matt Henjak and Ricky Stuart.

His father, Ron Giteau, is a former professional rugby league footballer, and his older sister Kristy Giteau is a dual-code rugby international for Australia. On 11 December 2010, Matt Giteau married Bianca Franklin, a former netball player with the Adelaide Thunderbirds. They have three children: Levi, Kai, and Winter.

== Playing career ==
=== 2001–05 ===
Giteau made his debut for the ACT Brumbies in 2001 and the Wallabies in 2002. During this time he won two Super Rugby titles with the Brumbies in the 2001 Super 12 season and the 2004 Super 12 season and was a part of the Wallabies at the 2003 Rugby World Cup.

=== 2006–07 ===
In April 2006 Giteau announced that he would play for the Western Force Super Rugby team, in the 2007 Super 14 season. He was included in the Wallabies 2006 mid-year rugby tests squad, but was ruled out with an injury. However, he recovered in time for the 2006 Tri Nations Series. He came off the bench in the first game in the series.

In 2007, Giteau was selected for the Wallabies 2007 Rugby World Cup and was first choice No. 12. He had also scored 40 test points, putting him in the top scorer's list in the competition. Giteau took injuries into the quarter-final, and the Wallabies lost the match to England 10–12.

Following the Rugby World Cup, Giteau played fly-half for the Barbarians against Rugby World Cup winners South Africa. Giteau scored a try, and the Barbarians won 22–5.

=== 2008 ===
In 2008, new Wallabies coach Robbie Deans selected Giteau as Australia's new fly-half, following the retirement of Stephen Larkham.

Giteau played fly-half against Ireland and France in the mid-year Test. In the 2008 Tri Nations Series, Giteau played in all six games. He played against the All Blacks winning 34–22 at the ANZ Stadium in Sydney, and against South Africa winning 27–15 at Kings Park Stadium in Durban.

Giteau was also a part of the Wallabies' record loss that following week to South Africa 53–8.

=== Super Rugby ===
Giteau played for the Western Force for 2007–09. In 2007 the Force finished seventh, and recorded their first home win (17–18 against the Hurricanes).

In 2010 Giteau returned to Canberra and the Brumbies, where he played for 2010 and 2011.

=== Move to France ===
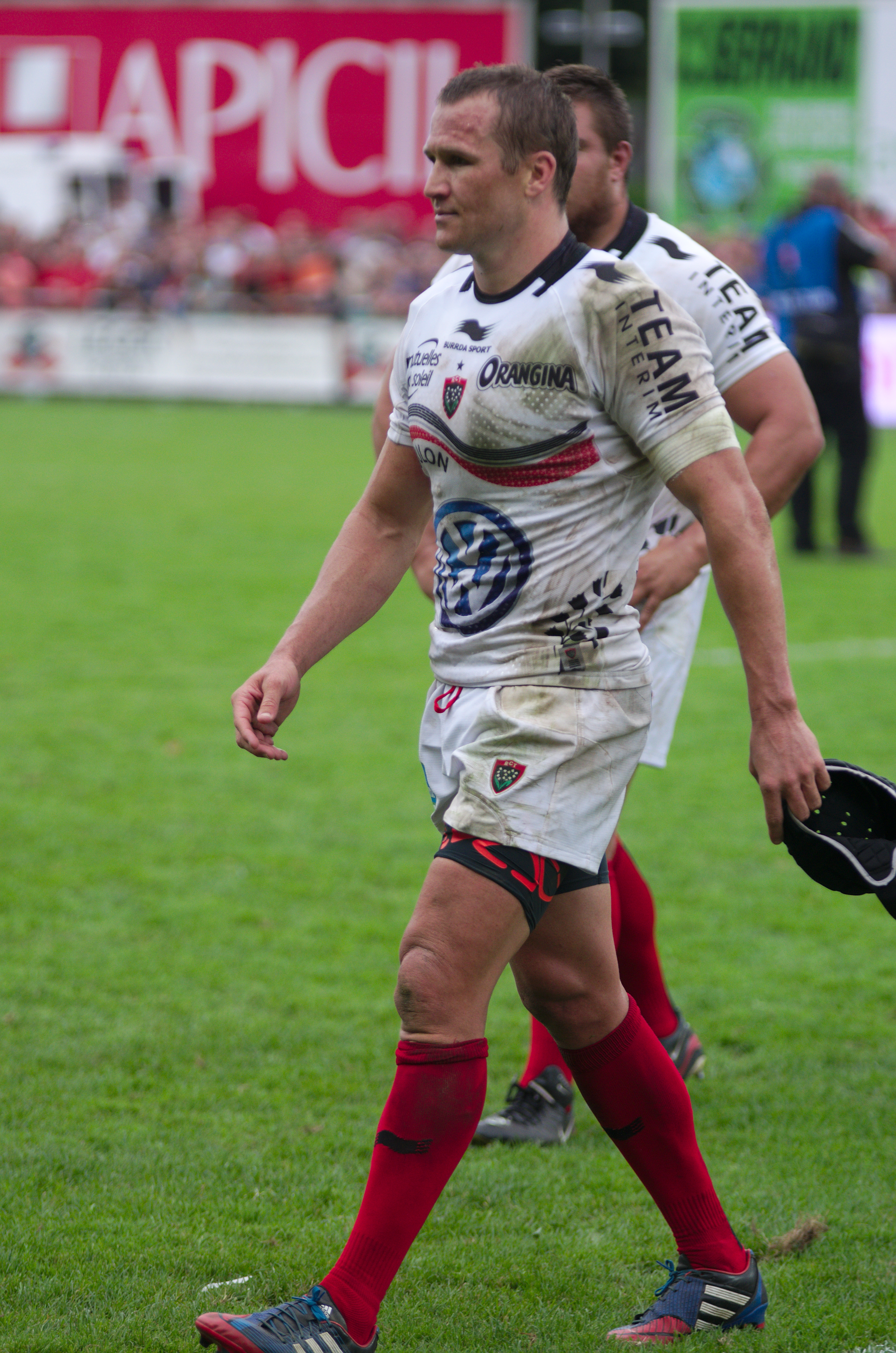
Giteau in 2013

During the 2011 Super Rugby season, Giteau signed with the French club Toulon, a move that would take effect after the 2011 Rugby World Cup. Despite not being selected for the Australian World Cup squad, he could not join Toulon until mid-November, as he was still under contract with the Australian Rugby Union through the World Cup. In May 2013 he started as Toulon won the 2013 Heineken Cup Final by 16–15 against Clermont Auvergne. He won three European titles with Toulon starting all three. In 2015 they won three successive European titles, (2013 vs Clermont 16–15, 2014 vs Saracens 23–6, and 2015 vs Clermont 24–18). He also won the Top 14 in 2014.

=== 2015 ===
In 2015, national coach Michael Cheika negotiated with the Australian Rugby Union to allow players with 60 caps or more eligible to represent the Wallabies despite not playing in the Super Rugby known as Giteau's law. Giteau played against the Springboks winning 24–20 at Suncorp Stadium, and against the All Blacks 27–19 at ANZ Stadium. Giteau was selected in the Wallabies 31-man squad for the 2015 Rugby World Cup. In October, during the tournament, Giteau scored his 30th international try for the Wallabies as part of their win against England, knocking them out of the tournament. Giteau was a key player for the Wallabies in reaching the Rugby World Cup final, but he copped a head knock in the opening stages of the final and was ruled out of the remainder of the match, which the Wallabies lost to the All Blacks 17–34.

=== Top League ===
In March 2017, Giteau announced that he would spend his last season with Toulon as a player-coach. On 15 May 2017, Giteau confirmed his move to Japan with Suntory Sungoliath in the Top League next season.

=== Major League Rugby ===
In March 2021 Giteau joined his former Australia teammate, Adam Ashley-Cooper at the LA Giltinis for the 2021 Major League Rugby season.

In August 2021, Giteau played his last professional game of rugby union after a man of the match performance in the Giltini's MLR shield win against Rugby ATL. Giteau was named in the MLR team of the season with 98 points scored in 13 matches played. Giteau returned to the Giltinis in 2022.

In late 2023, on his podcast, Kick Offs and Kick Ons, Giteau announced that he would come out of retirement to join the San Diego Legion for the 2024 MLR season.
