= Charlotte Barras =

English rugby union player

- Born: 26 January 1982 (age 44)
- Height: 1.72 m (5 ft 7 1/2 in)
- Weight: 85 kg (187 lb; 13 st 5 lb)

Rugby union career
- Position(s): Fullback, Wing
International career
Years	Team	Apps	(Points)
2004–????	England	42	
National sevens team
Years	Team		Comps
- England
Medal record
Representing England
Women's rugby union
Rugby World Cup
Silver medal – second place	2010 England	Team competition
Silver medal – second place	2006 Canada	Team competition

Charlotte Anne Barras (born 26 January 1982) is a former English rugby union player who represented England at the 2010 Women's Rugby World Cup. She scored the only try in their loss to New Zealand in the final. Barras was a member of the 2009 Rugby World Cup Sevens squad. She is the director of PE and sport and A level PE teacher at St Helen and St Katharine, a school in Abingdon-on-Thames, Oxfordshire.
