= Catrin Edwards =

Wales international rugby union footballer

- Born: 15 September 1980 (age 46) Carmarthen, Wales
- Height: 168 cm (5 ft 6 in)

Rugby union career
- Position: Prop
Amateur team(s)
Years	Team	Apps	(Points)
- Llandaff North/Scarlets/Gloucester
International career
Years	Team	Apps	(Points)
	Wales	70	
National sevens team
Years	Team		Comps
- Wales

Catrin Edwards (born 15 September 1980) is a Welsh rugby union player. She plays at the prop position and has been capped 70 times for Wales. She was part of the Welsh team to the 2010 and 2014 Women's Rugby World Cups. She is a PE teacher by profession. She took a four-year break before returning to Welsh rugby in 2009.

In January 2013, she was selected in the Wales squad for 2013 Women's Six Nations Championship. On 17 March 2018, Edwards represented the Barbarians in a match against the British Army; the Barbarians won the game 37–0.
