= Kate Porter =

- Born: 19 April 1983 (age 43) Sydney

Rugby union career
- Position: Lock
Senior career
Years	Team	Apps	(Points)
	Australian Services RU		(0)
International career
Years	Team	Apps	(Points)
2006–2010	Australia	12	

Kate Porter (born 19 April 1983) is a former Australian rugby union player. She represented Australia at the 2006, and 2010 Women's Rugby World Cup where they finished in third place.

Porter also played in the 2006 Rugby World Cup in Canada. In October 2007, she was named in the Wallaroos squad for the two-Test series against New Zealand.

Porter is an Army Major in the Australian Defence Force.
