= Amber Penrith =

England international rugby union player

- Born: 24 July 1980 (age 46) Stroud, Gloucestershire, England
- Height: 1.69 m (5 ft 6 1/2 in)
- Weight: 64 kg (141 lb)

Rugby union career
- Position: Wing
International career
Years	Team	Apps	(Points)
2007–2009	England	12	(25)
Medal record
Representing England
Women's rugby union
Rugby World Cup
Silver medal – second place	2010 England	Team competition

Amber Penrith (born 24 July 1980) is an English rugby union player who represented England at the 2010 Women's Rugby World Cup.

Penrith came out of retirement in 2009 to play in a three test series against New Zealand after announcing her retirement in 2008.
