= Pulane Motloung =

- Born: 3 October 1985 (age 41) South Africa
- School: kahobotjha-Sakubusha
- University: Tukkie

Rugby union career
- Position(s): Flanker, hooker
Youth career
- 1999: Zamdela Ladies Team
- Kempton Wolves
Senior career
Years	Team	Apps	(Points)
- Harlequins Women's Rugby
- Tuks Ladies Rugby
International career
Years	Team	Apps	(Points)
2010	South Africa		
Coaching career
- Years: Team
- Tuks Ladies Rugby

Pulane Ivonne Motloung (born 3 October 1985) is a women's rugby union player from Newcastle, Kwazulu Natal, raised in the free state farms South Africa. She played for the Falcons, Blue Bulls, and Lions women's teams and the South Africa women's national rugby union team, also a former tuks ladies rugby team player and a coach.

== Career ==
She played in the 2010 Women's Rugby World Cup
