= Megan Shanahan =

- Born: 29 November 1985 (age 40)

Rugby union career
- Position: Flanker
Senior career
Years	Team	Apps	(Points)
- Orange Emus
International career
Years	Team	Apps	(Points)
2010	Australia		

Megan Shanahan (born 29 November 1985) is a female rugby union player. She represented Australia at the 2010 Women's Rugby World Cup, finishing third.

She teaches at Dubbo Senior College Campus.
