= Vita Robinson =

New Zealand rugby union player (born 1982)

Vita Dryden
- Born: 20 December 1982 (age 43)
- Height: 1.8 m (5 ft 11 in)
- Weight: 72 kg (159 lb; 11 st 5 lb)
- Occupation: Teacher

Rugby union career
- Position: Lock
Provincial / State sides
Years	Team	Apps	(Points)
- Auckland
International career
Years	Team	Apps	(Points)
2007–2013	New Zealand	14	(0)
Medal record
Representing New Zealand
Women's rugby union
Rugby World Cup
Gold medal – first place	2010 England	Team competition

Vita Dryden (née Robinson, born 20 December 1982) is a female rugby union player for New Zealand and Auckland. She was a member of the 2010 Women's Rugby World Cup squad.
