= Karina Stowers =

- Born: 2 February 1986 (age 40)
- Height: 1.67 m (5 ft 5 1/2 in)
- Weight: 75 kg (165 lb; 11 st 11 lb)

Rugby union career
- Position: Hooker
Provincial / State sides
Years	Team	Apps	(Points)
2005–2017	Auckland	57	(50)
International career
Years	Team	Apps	(Points)
2005–2013	New Zealand	17	(0)
Medal record
Representing New Zealand
Women's rugby union
Rugby World Cup
Gold medal – first place	2010 England	Team competition

Karina Stowers (née Penetito; born 2 February 1986) is a New Zealand rugby union player. She played for New Zealand internationally and provincially for Auckland.

== Rugby career ==
Stowers made her test debut for New Zealand aged 19, on 29 June 2005 against Scotland at Ottawa.

Stowers was part of the Black Ferns squad that won the 2010 Rugby World Cup. She toured England with the Black Ferns in 2012. She featured in the first test which they lost 13–16 at Esher.

In 2013, Stowers was named in the Black Ferns squad that faced England in three test matches. They clinched the series after beating the Red Roses 14–9 in the second test.

== Personal life ==
In December 2011, she married New Zealand sevens representative and former Blues winger Sherwin Stowers.
