= Caroline Fairs =

- Born: Caroline Vakalahi; 4 January 1983 (age 43); Nuku’alofa, Tonga
- Occupation: Army Officer
- Height: 1.73 m (5 ft 8 in)
- Weight: 83 kg (183 lb; 13 st 1 lb)

Rugby union career
- Position: Prop
International career
| Years | Team | Apps | (Points) |
| 2010– | Australia | - | (-) |
- Military career
- Allegiance: Australia
- Branch: Australian Army
- Service years: 2007–
- Rank: Captain
- Conflicts: War in Afghanistan

Caroline Fairs (née Vakalahi; born 4 January 1983) is an Australian female rugby union player and an Officer in the Australian Army.

== Rugby career ==
Fairs played in the Australia women's national rugby union team in the 2010 Women's Rugby World Cup that finished in third place, she was also named in Australia's 2014 Women's Rugby World Cup squad. After a break in which she gave birth, in 2017 Fairs was selected to represent Australia at the International Women's Rugby Series in New Zealand, she credited her return to the game with helping her recover from post-natal depression.

Fairs has also played for the Australian Services Rugby Union–Women’s team as well as the Wests Bulldogs Rugby Club, North Brisbane Rugby Club and Easts Tigers Rugby Union in the Queensland Premier Rugby women’s competition.

== Military career ==
Fairs joined the Australian Army in 2007 and is an Officer in the Royal Australian Corps of Transport. Fairs has served operationally at Al Minhad Air Base in Dubai and in Kabul in the War in Afghanistan.
