= Fiao'o Fa'amausili =

NZ international rugby union player

Fiao'o Fa'amausili ONZM
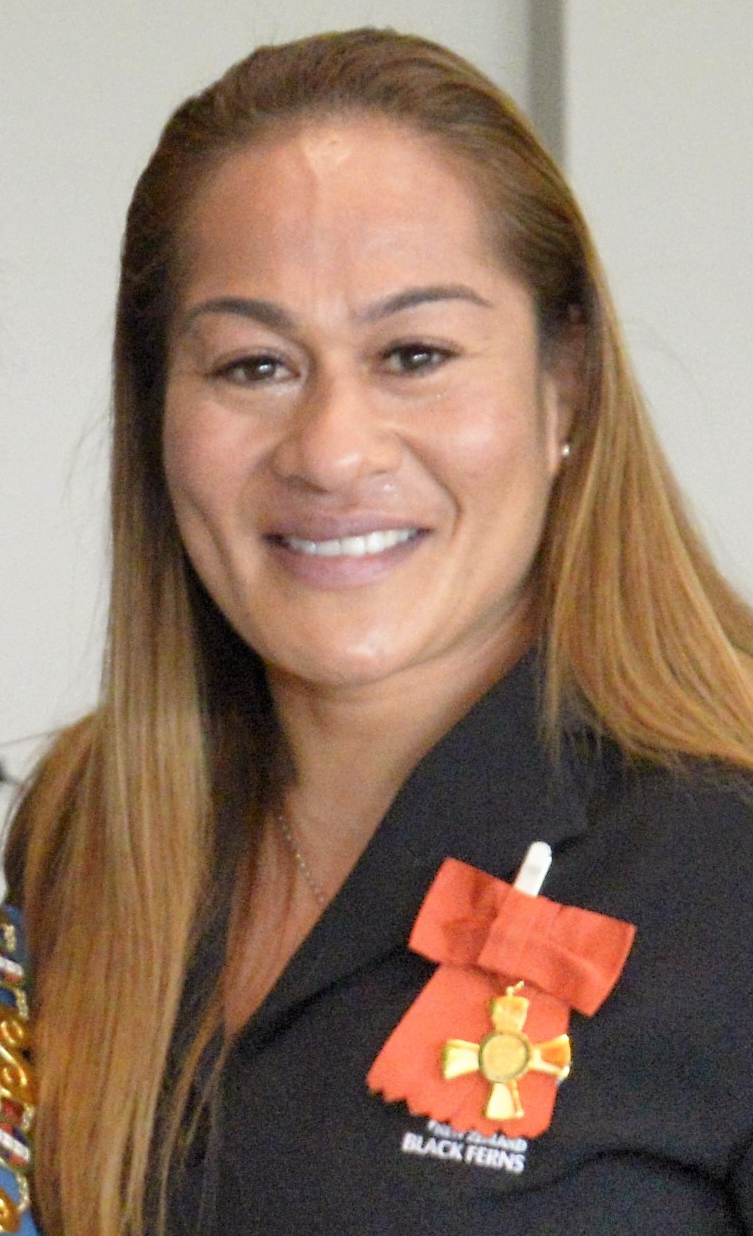
- Fa'amausili in 2018
- Born: 30 September 1980 (age 46)
- Height: 1.63 m (5 ft 4 in)
- Weight: 82 kg (181 lb)

Rugby union career
- Position: Hooker
Provincial / State sides
Years	Team	Apps	(Points)
2005–present	Auckland	106	(220)
International career
Years	Team	Apps	(Points)
2002–2018	New Zealand	58	(85)
Medal record
Women's rugby union
Representing New Zealand
Women's Rugby World Cup
Gold medal – first place	2017 Ireland	Team competition
Gold medal – first place	2010 England	Team competition
Gold medal – first place	2006 Canada	Team competition
Gold medal – first place	2002 Spain	Team competition

Fiao'o Fa'amausili ONZM (born 30 September 1980) is a former New Zealand female rugby union player. She played for New Zealand and Auckland. She made her Black Ferns debut on 18 May 2002 against Australia at Barcelona. She was a member of the winning Black Ferns squad for the 2010 Women's Rugby World Cup. She has been to five World Cups beginning from 2002–2017.

== Early life ==
Fa'amausili was born in Samoa, she moved with her family to New Zealand when she was five. Her mother is from Fogapoa in Savai’i and her father is from the villages of Faleula and Aleisa in Apia. She visits Samoa every year. She is a police detective in south Auckland.

== Career ==
Faamausili has won four Women’s Rugby World Cup titles and captained the Black Ferns between 2012 and 2018. She has played over 100 games for Auckland and won several provincial titles.

Fa'amausili was named as captain of the Black Ferns for the inaugural 2015 Women's Rugby Super Series held in Canada. She was named in the 2017 Women's Rugby World Cup squad.

In the 2018 Queen's Birthday Honours, Fa'amausili was appointed an Officer of the New Zealand Order of Merit, for services to rugby.

In 2019, Fa'amausili was on the voting panel for the World Rugby Breakthrough Player of the Year award. She was one of 31 Black Ferns who were capped at the Black Ferns capping ceremony in Auckland at Eden Park. She received two caps, one was for her debut and another one for 50 Test matches. She is the first Black Fern to reach the 50-game milestone. She was elected as the Auckland Rugby Union's first female President in 2021.

Fa'amausili was inducted into the World Rugby Hall of Fame in a special ceremony during the 2021 Rugby World Cup semi-finals at Eden Park on 5 November 2022. In 2024, she was an inaugural inductee into the Pasifika Rugby Hall of Fame.
