= Rebecca Trethowan =

Australia international rugby union player (born 1985)

- Born: 8 February 1985 (age 41) Dubbo, NSW

Rugby union career
- Position: Flanker
International career
Years	Team	Apps	(Points)
2006–2014	Australia	16	(0)

Rebecca Smyth (née Trethowan born 8 February 1985) is an Australian former rugby union player. She represented Australia at the 2006, 2010, and 2014 Women's Rugby World Cups.

== Rugby career ==
Smyth was a member of the Wallaroos squad at the 2006 Women's Rugby World Cup that was held in Canada.

She was named in a 22-player squad that toured New Zealand in October 2007. In 2008, she toured New Zealand again with the Wallaroos for a Two-Test series.

In 2009, she scored a hat-trick in the Wallaroos 15-try trouncing of Samoa during their Oceania qualifier for the 2010 World Cup in England, the score was 87–0.

She represented Australia at the 2010 Rugby World Cup, they finished in third place. She also competed in the 2014 Rugby World Cup in France.
