= Rebecca Mahoney =

NZ international rugby union player & referee

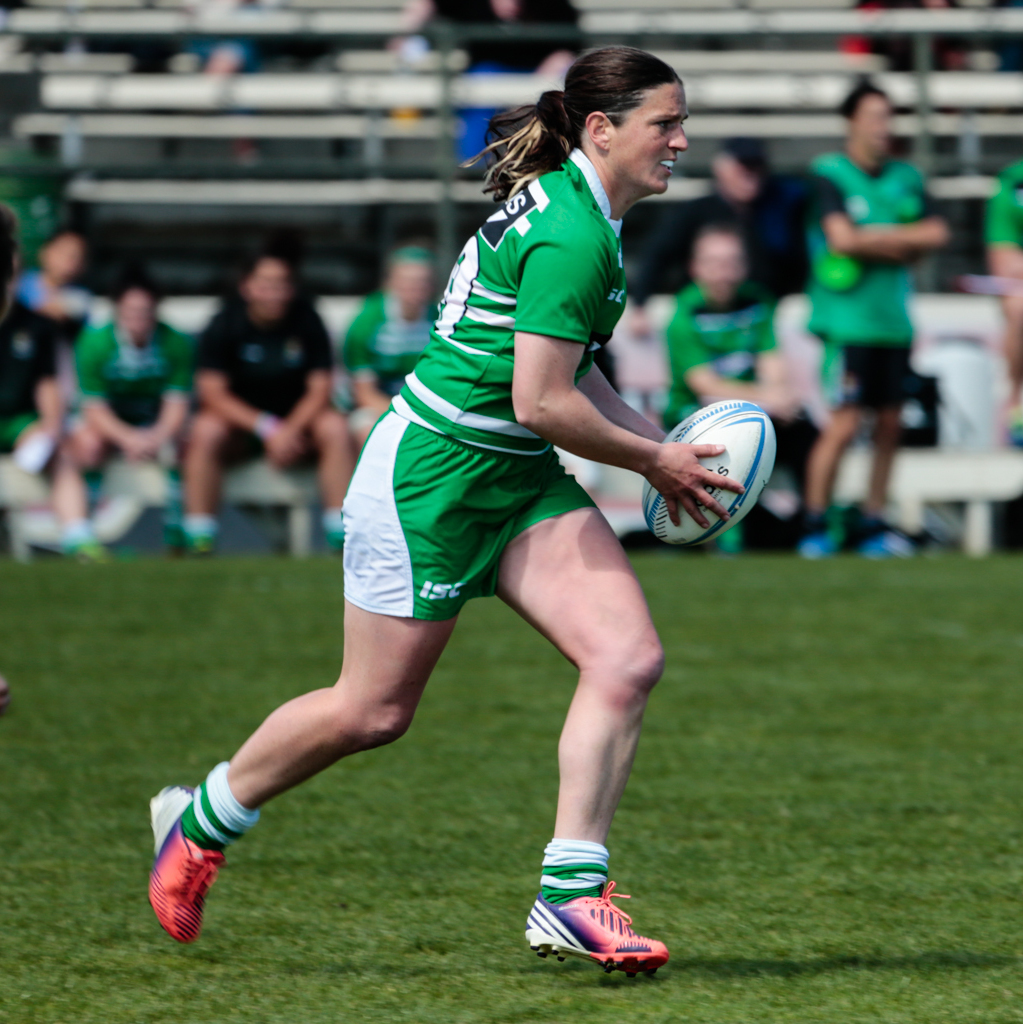
- Canterbury vs Manawatu, 12 October 2013 at Rugby Park
- Born: Rebecca Marie Hull; 25 August 1983 (age 43) Masterton, New Zealand
- Height: 1.63 m (5 ft 4 in)
- Weight: 70 kg (154 lb)

Rugby union career
- Position: Flyhalf
Amateur team(s)
Years	Team	Apps	(Points)
1999	Bush RFU		(0)
–	Eketahuna		(0)
Provincial / State sides
Years	Team	Apps	(Points)
2000–2016	Wellington		(0)
	Manawatu		(0)
-	Hawke's Bay		(0)
International career
Years	Team	Apps	(Points)
2004–2011	New Zealand	19	(25)
Medal record
Women's rugby union
Representing New Zealand
Rugby World Cup
Gold medal – first place	2006 Canada	Team competition
Gold medal – first place	2010 England	Team competition

Rebecca Mahoney (née Hull, born 25 August 1983) is a former rugby union footballer and referee. She represented New Zealand and Wellington Rugby Football Union. She was a member of the Black Ferns 2006 and 2010 Rugby World Cup winning squads.

== Personal life ==
Mahoney attended Alfredton Primary School and Palmerston North Girls' High School, where she was Dux Ludorum. She currently farms with her husband Luke in the Tararua District, New Zealand.

== Refereeing career ==
Mahoney was a rugby referee in New Zealand. She is the first of two women to be named to the New Zealand Elite Referee Squad. She reffed at the 2018 Commonwealth Games and the 2018 Rugby World Cup Sevens.

Mahoney was also named to the World Referee Squad and refereed the 2018 World Rugby Women's Sevens Series in Dubai, Japan, Australia, London, and New Zealand.

Mahoney's first international referring rugby union test was in Hong Kong. She retired from first class refereeing in 2021.
