= Cobie-Jane Morgan =

Australia international rugby union & league player

- Born: 29 June 1989 (age 37) Gosford, NSW
- Height: 159 cm (5 ft 3 in)
- Weight: 57 kg (9 st 0 lb)

Rugby union career
- Position: Halfback
International career
Years	Team	Apps	(Points)
2009–2019	Australia	20	(0)
National sevens team
Years	Team		Comps
- Australia
- Rugby league career

Playing information
- Position: Five-eighth
Club
Years	Team	Pld	T	G	FG	P
2022	Gold Coast Titans	3	0	0	0	0

Cobie-Jane Morgan (born 29 June 1989) is an Australian former rugby union, sevens & rugby league player. She played internationally for Australia and competed at the 2010 and 2014 Rugby World Cup's.

== Early life ==
Morgan is of Māori descent and grew up in Central Coast in New South Wales.

== Rugby career ==
=== Rugby union ===
Morgan made her test debut for Australia against Samoa on 8 August 2009 in Apia. The Wallaroos scored 87 unanswered points over hosts, Samoa, in their Oceania qualifier for the 2010 World Cup.

She was a member of the Wallaroos squad that finished in third place at the 2010 Rugby World Cup in England. She was also named in Australia's 2014 Rugby World Cup squad.

She was in the Australian women's sevens team for two years. She played for the NSW Waratahs in the first Super W season in 2018.

In 2019, she made her final appearance for the Wallaroos in the second match of a two-test series against Japan in Sydney. She was named captain of the Queensland Reds for the 2021 Super W season.

=== Rugby league ===
In 2021, Morgan had a stint with the Gold Coast Titans in the NRLW.
