= Huriana Manuel =

New Zealand rugby union player

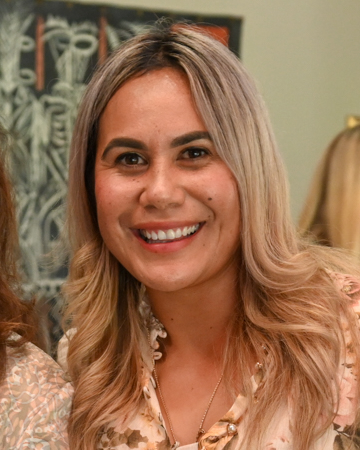
- Manuel in 2024
- Full name: Huriana Manuel-Carpenter
- Born: 8 August 1986 (age 40) Auckland, New Zealand
- Height: 1.55 m (5 ft 1 in)
- Weight: 65 kg (143 lb)
- Notable relative(s): Liza Mihinui (mother); Derek Carpenter (husband)

Rugby union career
- Position: Centre
Provincial / State sides
Years	Team	Apps	(Points)
2005–	Auckland Storm		
International career
Years	Team	Apps	(Points)
2005–2014	New Zealand	27	(75)
National sevens team
Years	Team		Comps
2009–	New Zealand		
Medal record
Representing New Zealand
Women's rugby union
Rugby World Cup
Gold medal – first place	2010 England	Team competition
Gold medal – first place	2006 Canada	Team competition
Women's rugby sevens
Olympic Games
Silver medal – second place	2016 Rio de Janeiro	Team competition
Rugby World Cup Sevens
Gold medal – first place	2013 Moscow	Team competition
Silver medal – second place	2009 Dubai	Team competition

Huriana Manuel-Carpenter (born 8 August 1986) is a New Zealand rugby union player. She plays for the Black Ferns, the New Zealand women's sevens team and Auckland.

== Rugby career ==
Manuel was part of the Black Ferns squad that won the 2006 and 2010 Rugby World Cup's. In 2009, she was part of the Black Ferns sevens team that were runners-up at the Rugby World Cup Sevens in Dubai.

== Honours ==
In 2021, World Rugby inducted Manuel into its World Rugby Hall of Fame, alongside Osea Kolinisau, Humphrey Kayange, Cheryl McAfee, Will Carling and Jim Telfer.

== Personal life ==
Of Māori descent, Manuel affiliates to the Ngāti Tūwharetoa and Ngāpuhi iwi. Manuel's mother, Liza Mihinui, is a former Black Fern. They are the first mother and daughter to play for the Black Ferns.

In August 2021, it was announced that she would feature in the 2021 season of Celebrity Treasure Island.
