= Non Evans =

Welsh multi-discipline sportswoman and TV personalty

Non Evans MBE
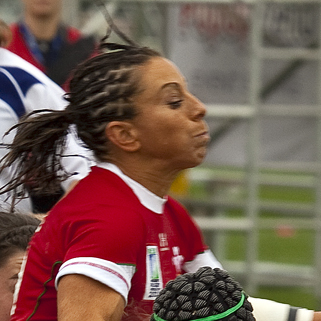
- Born: 20 June 1974 (age 52) Swansea, Wales
- Height: 1.6 m (5 ft 3 in)
- Weight: 58 kg (9 st 2 lb)

Rugby union career
- Position(s): Fullback, Centre, Wing
International career
Years	Team	Apps	(Points)
1996–2010	Wales	87	(489)
- Wales 7s
2003	World XV	2	

Non Evans MBE (born 20 June 1974) is a Welsh multi-discipline sportswoman and TV personality who has competed internationally in rugby union, rugby sevens, touch rugby, judo, weightlifting and freestyle wrestling.

Evans is notable for being the first person to compete in two separate sports at the same Commonwealth games and for later becoming the first woman to compete in three sports at multiple games. In rugby union, she is the world's all-time leading points scorer and Wales' top try scorer in either women's or men's internationals.

== Early life ==
Evans was brought up in Pontarddulais and described herself as "very sporty" despite being "very small". She spent her early years competing as an acrobat with Bynea Acrobatic Club, appearing on UK TV programmes Blue Peter and Going Live!. At secondary school (St Michael's School, Llanelli), Evans won tennis tournaments every year and took up Judo at the Pontarddulais Judo Club, where she became Welsh Judo champion in her first year as a competitor. Evans would continue to compete at the Welsh Judo Championships every year until she attended university, where she took up rugby.

== Judo, weightlifting and wrestling ==
"I used to do clean and jerks and snatch, and one day someone came up to me and said, “You’re lifting a lot of weight, there. How much do you weigh?”. And I said, “About 57, 58 kilograms”. I was lifting way over my body weight and he said, “You’ll probably qualify for the Commonwealth Games if you went to the Welsh Championships”, and, being a competitive person, I thought, “Well, I’ve nothing to lose”. So I went to the Welsh Championships and won it, went to the British Championships and won it, and qualified for the Commonwealth Games in Manchester. But it was difficult in Manchester, because I was doing the judo and the weightlifting. Doing two sports in one Games is one of the hardest things I’ve had to do, but I wasn’t going to give up the opportunity to lift for my country and fight for my country, so I did it."

— Evans, on how she came to compete at two separate sports at the Manchester games in 2002.

At 16, Evans became the youngest competitor at the Commonwealth Judo Championships, going on to win silver medals at the 1992 and 1996 Championships. Evans would also compete at the 2002 Commonwealth Games in Manchester.

The 2002 Commonwealth Judo Championships were held as an official competition in the Commonwealth Games for the first time in twelve years, and Evans was expected to represent Wales in the Judo event. However that year Evans had also taken up competitive weightlifting, winning that year's Welsh Weightlifting Championship and British Championship. As such Evans also qualified for the Weightlifting event, becoming the first person to compete in two separate sports at the same Commonwealth Games.

Evans achievement is all the more notable as the two events were held on consecutive days (31 July and 1 August), and her weightlifting qualifying weight was under 63 kg while her judo qualifying weight was 57 kg. Evans has stated that her training for the weightlifting led to weight gain, which would necessitate severe dieting and dehydrating to meet the lower weight for Judo. At the event, Evans weighed in at 56.1 kilos and competed in the Judo event for the rest of the day. Overnight, Evans added nearly five kilos of weight, to get to 62.8 kg at the next morning's weigh in. Evans has since described competing in the two events as "one of the hardest things I’ve had to do" adding that it took her months to recover from the rapid change in weight.

In 2010 Evans took up yet another sport in Wrestling, winning the Welsh Wrestling Championship at her first attempt and taking the silver medal at the British Wrestling Championships in the under-59 kg class. Later that year, Evans was named as captain of the Welsh Wrestling team for the 2010 Commonwealth Games in Delhi, on the same day she was also named as part of the Wales rugby squad for the 2010 World Cup. At Delhi, Evans became the first female athlete in the history of the Commonwealth games to compete in three separate sports.

== Rugby ==
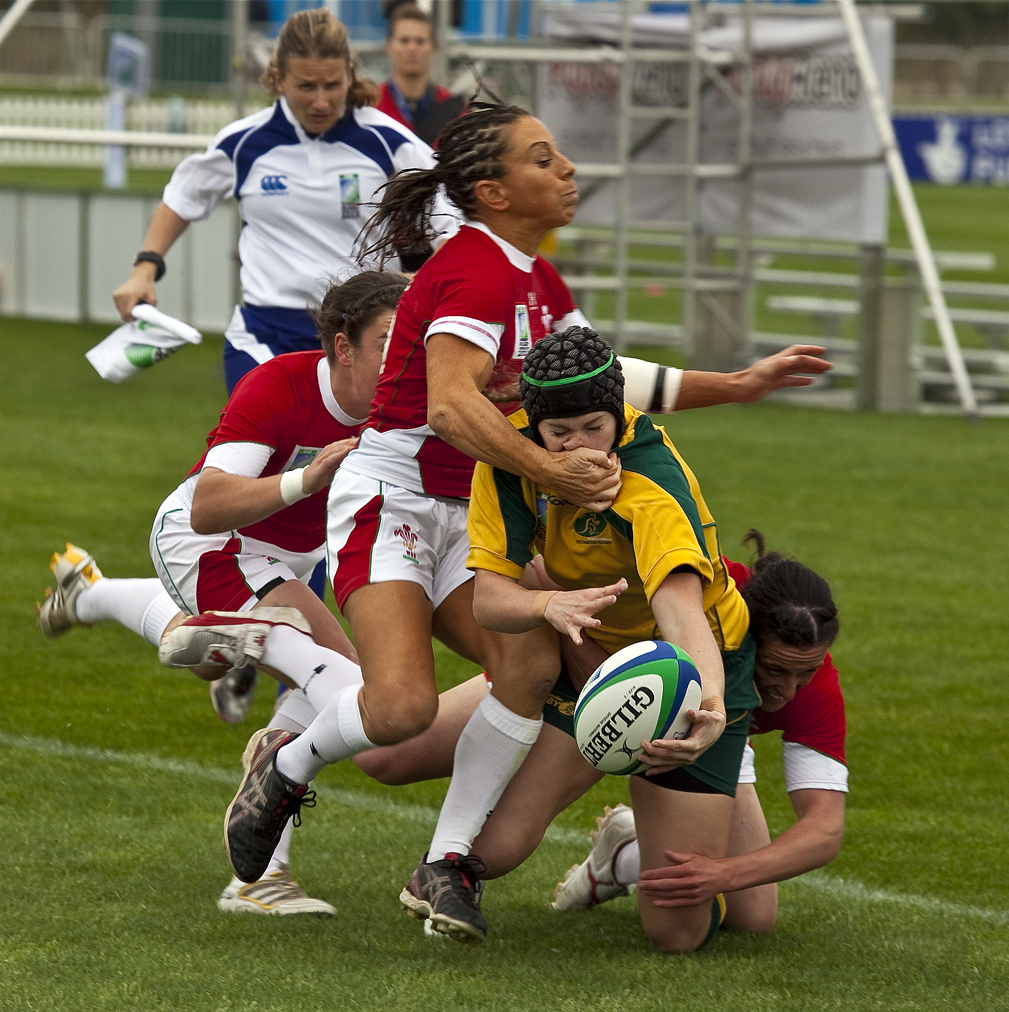
Evans in a tackle against Australia's Nicole Beck in one of her last appearances in the 2010 World Cup

Evans made her debut for Wales against Scotland in 1996, going on to play 87 times for her country, competing in the 1998 and 2010 World Cups. In the 2009 Women's Six Nations Championship, Evans played a pivotal role in Wales' first win against England, kicking a last minute penalty to win the match by a single point.

Although her preferred position was fullback, Evans wide range of skills saw her play in positions across the back line, she has also represented Wales in touch rugby and rugby sevens. Evans became both a prolific try scorer and goal kicker for the national team, scoring 64 International tries and kicking a further 169 points. As such Evans holds the record for most international tries for Wales in either men's and women's rugby, as well as being the world's leading points scorer and leading try scorer in Women's international rugby.

== Media work ==
On 18 October 1997, Evans competed in the sixth series of Gladiators but was defeated in the heats. Also in 1997, Evans became the first female reporter and presenter for men’s rugby union on the Welsh language television channel S4C. Evans is also a commentator for the BBC, commentating for the broadcaster on both the weightlifting and wrestling events at the 2012 London Olympics.

== Personal life ==
As well as her media work, Evans has worked as a medical representative for a pharmaceutical company and as a fitness and health coach. She is a Welsh speaker. Evans was appointed Member of the Order of the British Empire (MBE) in the 2011 Birthday Honours for services to sport, the first female rugby player to receive the award. In 2003, Evans married former Wales and Llanelli RFC rugby union flanker Mark Perego. In 2020, Evans came out as gay in a post on Twitter. In 2020 she was sentenced for making hoax 999 calls
