= Tricia Brown =

Australian rugby union player

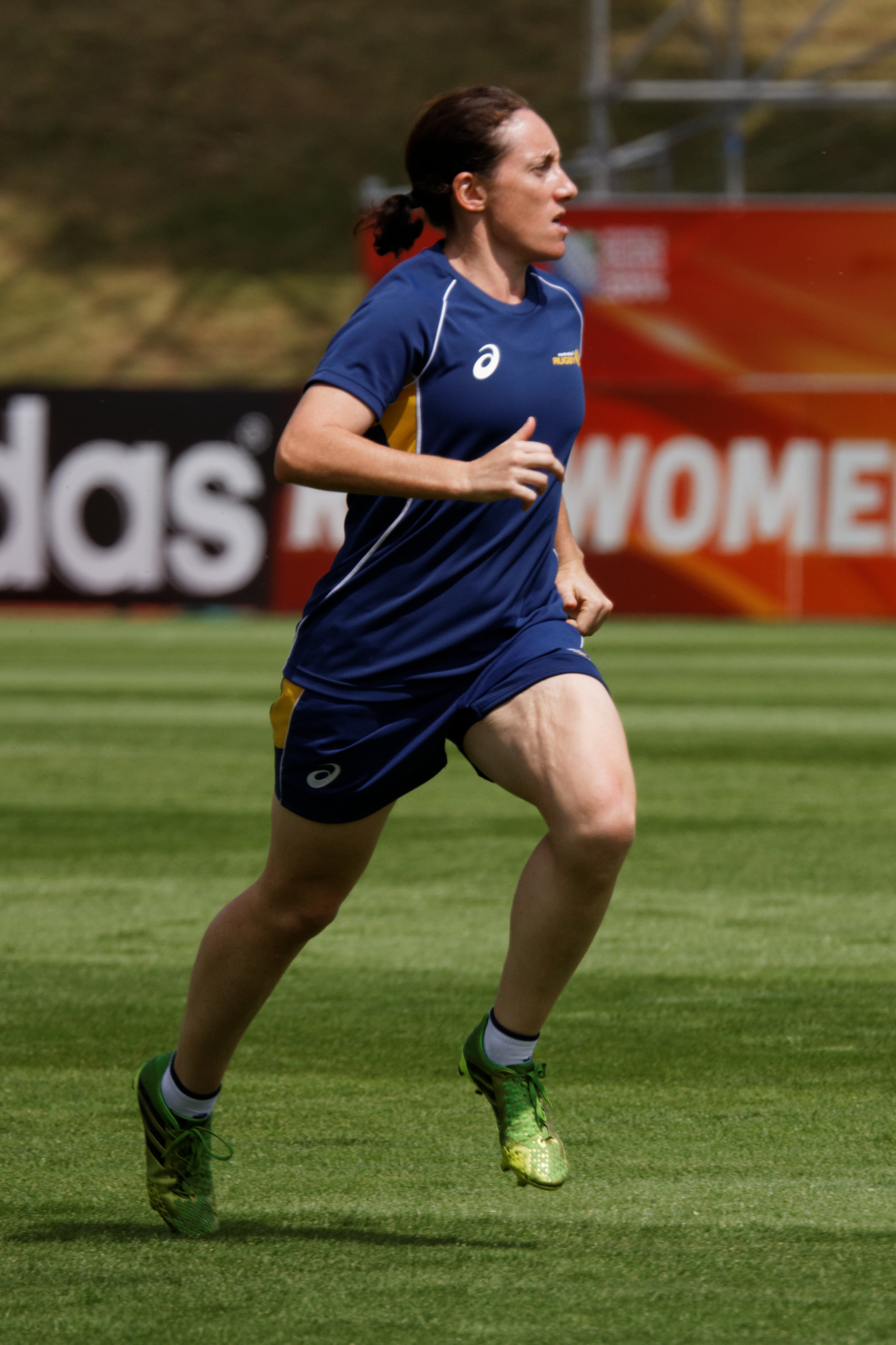
- Born: 14 March 1979 (age 47) Mildura, Victoria
- Height: 163 cm (5 ft 4 in)
- Weight: 66 kg (146 lb)

Rugby union career
- Position(s): Fullback, Flyhalf
International career
Years	Team	Apps	(Points)
2006–2014	Australia	21	(70)
National sevens team
Years	Team		Comps
- Australia

Tricia Brown (born 14 March 1979) is an Australian female rugby union player. She has also represented Australia in sevens rugby and cricket. She represented the Wallaroos at three Rugby World Cup's.

Brown was a member of the Australian squad to the 2006 Rugby World Cup in Canada. In 2007, she was named a 22-player squad that toured New Zealand in October. She was part of the Wallaroos 2010 Rugby World Cup squad that finished in their best result of third place.

Brown was selected in Australia's 2014 Rugby World Cup squad to France. She played in the Wallaroos opening match against South Africa, which they won 26–3. She then scored a brace of tries against Wales in their 25–3 victory.

== Teaching suspension ==
Brown had her teaching registration suspended in 2009. She admitted to courting two year 12 students into lesbian relationships while she was employed as a P.E. teacher at both a private and public school in Brisbane. The Australian Rugby Union held an inquiry but decided not to impose any playing ban on her.
