= Nicole Beck =

Australian rugby union player

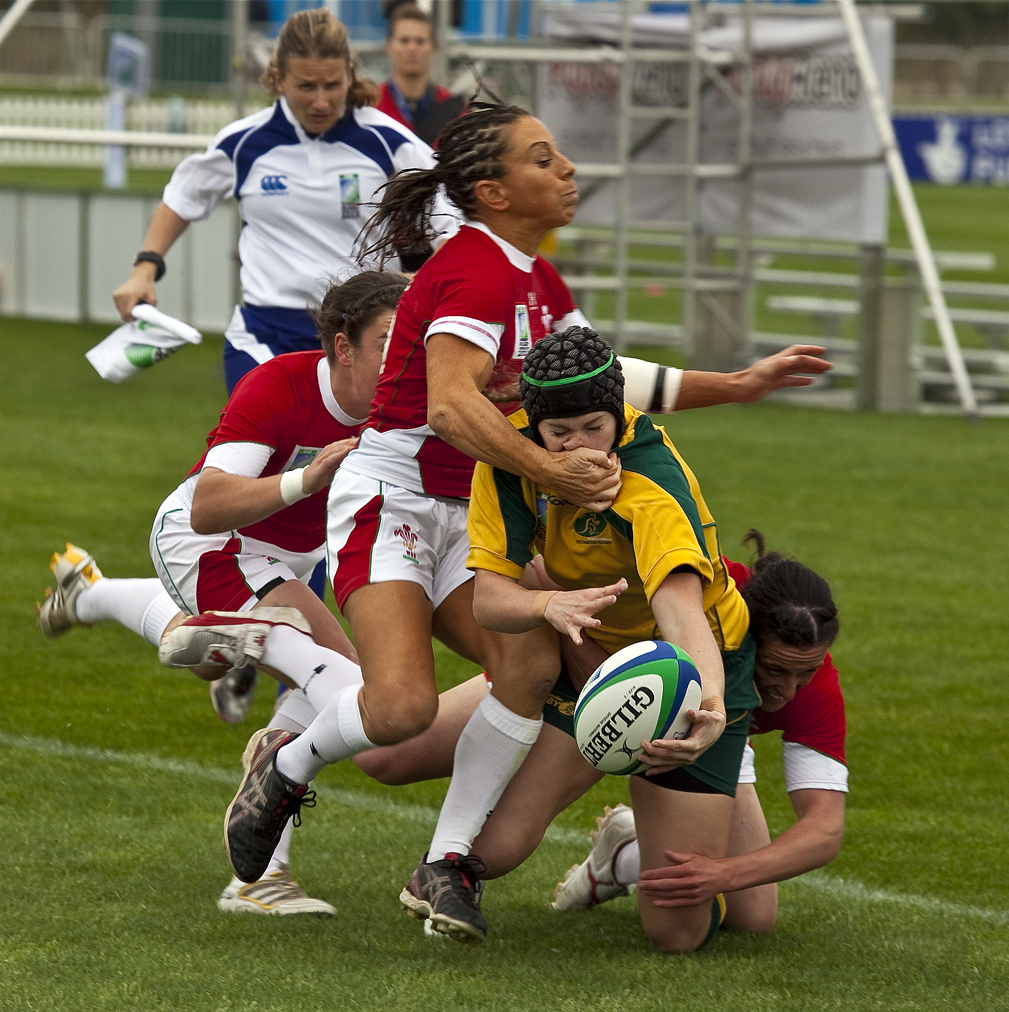
- Beck takes an impact from Non Evans
- Born: Nicole Elise Beck OAM; 28 May 1988 (age 38) Bulli, New South Wales, Australia
- Height: 1.68 m (5 ft 6 in)
- Weight: 66 kg (146 lb)
- School: Bulli High School
- University: University of Wollongong

Rugby union career
- Position: Wing
Senior career
Years	Team	Apps	(Points)
2008–2009	Warringah	2	(0)
2010–	Sydney University		
- Correct as of 24 December 2010
Provincial / State sides
Years	Team	Apps	(Points)
2009–	Sydney	6	(45)
- Correct as of 24 December 2010
International career
Years	Team	Apps	(Points)
2008–2010	Australia	8	(40)
- Correct as of 24 December 2010
National sevens team
Years	Team		Comps
2009–	Australia 7s		
Medal record
Women's rugby sevens
Representing Australia
Olympic Games
Gold medal – first place	2016 Rio de Janeiro	Team competition
Pacific Games
Silver medal – second place	2015 Port Moresby	Team competition

Nicole Elise Beck OAM (born 28 May 1988) is a female Australian rugby union player who plays as a wing for Australia, Sydney and Sydney University. She won a gold medal at the 2016 Summer Olympics in Rio.

== Career ==
A former Australian touch football representative, Beck was selected by Wallaroos coach Steve Hamson after just two games of 15-a-side rugby and made her international debut in the test match lost 36–3 to the Black Ferns on 14 October 2008 at Viking Park in Canberra. Only a few months before, Beck had been chosen to play with Australia Women's Sevens for the 2009 World Cup qualifiers scheduled on 25–26 July 2008 at Apia Park in Samoa. She scored a decisive try on full-time in the 22–15 win against New Zealand, claiming the Oceania Sevens champions title.

The following year, Australia won the Rugby World Cup Sevens defeating 15-10 New Zealand in a final started with a try by Beck in the second minute and ended in extra-time with a golden point strike by Shelly Matcham.

Beck played an important role in Australia's third place at the 2010 Women's Rugby World Cup, scoring 1 try, 11 conversions and 1 penalty, becoming one of the nominees for the 2010 IRB Women's Personality of the Year and pulling off a great try-saving tackle on Fiona Pocock during the semi-final against England.

She was a member of Australia's team at the 2016 Olympics, defeating New Zealand in the final to win the inaugural Olympic gold medal in the sport.

== Personal life ==
Beck currently studies a Bachelor of Educational Studies at Charles Sturt University.

At the 2017 Australia Day Honours she received the Medal of the Order of Australia for service to sport as a gold medallist at the Rio 2016 Olympic Games.
