= Lindsay Morgan =

Australian rugby union player (born 1979)

- Born: 18 October 1979 (age 47) Gold Coast, Queensland

Rugby union career
- Position: Prop
International career
Years	Team	Apps	(Points)
2006–2010	Australia	14	

Lindsay Morgan (born 18 October 1979) is an Australian female rugby union player. She represented Australia in 14 test matches from 2006 to 2010.

Morgan competed for the Wallaroos at the 2006 Rugby World Cup in Canada. She was also a member of the squad to the 2010 Rugby World Cup that finished in third place. She was named in a 22-player squad that toured New Zealand in October.
