= Kristy Giteau =

- Born: 16 March 1981 (age 45)
- Height: 168 cm (5 ft 6 in)

Rugby union career
- Position: Wing
International career
Years	Team	Apps	(Points)
2009–2010	Australia	5	(10)

Kristy Giteau (born 16 March 1981) is a former Australian rugby union player. She competed for Australia at the 2010 Women's Rugby World Cup.

== Early career ==
Giteau previously played for the Australian women's national rugby league team. She also toured with the Australian schoolgirls basketball team to China and the United States.

== Rugby union career ==
Giteau made her international debut for Australia against Samoa on 8 August 2009 in Apia. The Wallaroos scored 87 unanswered points over the hosts in their Oceania qualifier for the 2010 World Cup in England.

She was a member of the Wallaroos squad to the 2010 Women's Rugby World Cup that finished in third place. She scored two tries in the tournament.

In 2016, she switched to playing Touch rugby. She was appointed as co-president of Rugby Australia in 2024.

== Personal life ==
Giteau has three kids with her husband, Soakai Tai. She is the sister of former Wallabies player, Matt Giteau.
