= 2010 Women's Rugby World Cup =

Rugby union event held in England

Tournament details
- Host nation: England
- Dates: 20 August – 5 September 2010
- No. of nations: 12

Final positions
- Champions: New Zealand (4th title)
- Runner-up: England

Tournament statistics
- Matches played: 30
- Attendance: 30,000 (1,000 per match)
- Tries scored: 182 (average 6.07 per match)
- Top scorer(s): (New Zealand) Kelly Brazier (48)
- Most tries: (New Zealand) Carla Hohepa (7) (Canada) Heather Moyse (7)
- Points scored: 1,193 (average 39.77 per match)

The 2010 Women's Rugby World Cup was the sixth edition of the Women's Rugby World Cup and was held in England. The International Rugby Board Executive Committee selected the host union following a recommendation from the Rugby World Cup Limited board after considering bids from the Rugby Football Union and the German Rugby Union – it had been England's third successive bid after being rejected in 2002 and 2006. The tournament was again being organised by the International Rugby Board (IRB) as opposed to the host union, and included five matches for all teams played on 20, 24, 28 August and 1 and 5 September. In May 2009 it was announced that the semi-final, 3rd place play off and final would take place at The Stoop and not Twickenham as had previously been suggested. Pool games were held at the Surrey Sports Park in Guildford.

Interest in the tournament was far higher than had been anticipated. It was broadcast to 127 countries and all 2,500 seats at the opening two days of pool games were sold out, as was the third day despite the capacity being raised to 3,200. The semi-finals attracted over 6,000 spectators, while the final drew a crowd of 13,253 – a world record for a women's rugby international – and well as a worldwide TV audience of (according to IRB figures) half a million.

The competition was won by New Zealand who beat England 13–10 in the final.

Three tries from the tournament were shortlisted for the IRB's "Try of the Year" award.

== Bidding process ==
The Rugby Football Union for Women and the Rugby Football Union along with Germany, South Africa and Kazakhstan made bids to host the 2010 Women's Rugby World Cup. On 23 September, Rugby World Cup Limited Board chairman, Bernard Lapasset, announced that England would host the World Cup at various venues across West London.

== Qualifying ==
New Zealand, England and France qualified directly as the top three teams from the 2006 World Cup. Wales and Ireland qualified as second and third-place finishers in the 2009 Six Nations Championship. Scotland and Sweden qualified as the top two teams from the 2009 European Trophy. The United States, Canada and South Africa qualified directly as the only teams from their region. Kazakhstan qualified after winning the 2009 ARFU Women's Championship. Australia qualified as the second Oceania representative.

=== Qualified Teams ===
Africa	Americas	Europe	Oceania	Asia
South Africa (AQ)	Canada (AQ); United States (AQ)	England (AQ); France (AQ); Wales; Ireland; Scotland; Sweden	New Zealand (AQ); Australia	Kazakhstan

== Tickets and sponsorship ==
Tickets had been available since 22 March 2010 and they could be purchased online at Ticketmaster or by phone, with an innovative ticketing structure based on some tournament passes and individual match day tickets.
Thirteen matches were broadcast live through a platform provided by host broadcaster Sky Sports in 127 territories to a potential audience of 227 million homes, smashing the 2006 World Cup benchmark in Canada (75 territories and a potential reach of 97 million homes). The programming hours was increased from 60 in 2006 to 220 in this edition.
The commercial partners of the tournament were Nike, Heineken, the Coca-Cola Company's sports drink Powerade, Holiday Inn, British rugby equipment supplier Rhino Rugby, University of Surrey and UK National Lottery.

== Match officials ==
In December 2009, the IRB announced a panel of 14 match officials for the tournament, including seven world's leading female referees and three specialist assistant referees with previous Women's Rugby World Cup experience.
England's Clare Daniels officiated the opening match between Canada and Scotland, while Australian Sarah Corrigan refereed the final between England and New Zealand.

- (Australia) Sarah Corrigan
- (England) Clare Daniels
- (Hong Kong) Gabriel Lee
- (Italy) Barbara Guastini
- (Canada) Joyce Henry
- (England) Debbie Innes
- (New Zealand) Nicky Inwood
- (Ireland) David Keane
- (Germany) Kerstin Ljungdahl
- (Argentina) Javier Mancuso
- (Scotland) Andrew McMenemy
- (France) Sébastien Minery
- (United States) Dana Teagarden
- (Canada) Sherry Trumbull

== Format ==
The competition was contested over 16 days and 30 matches between 12 nations, divided into three pools of four teams. The tournament began on 20 August at Surrey Sports Park with a match between Canada and Scotland and ended with the final held at Twickenham Stoop on 5 September between England and New Zealand.

=== Pool stage ===
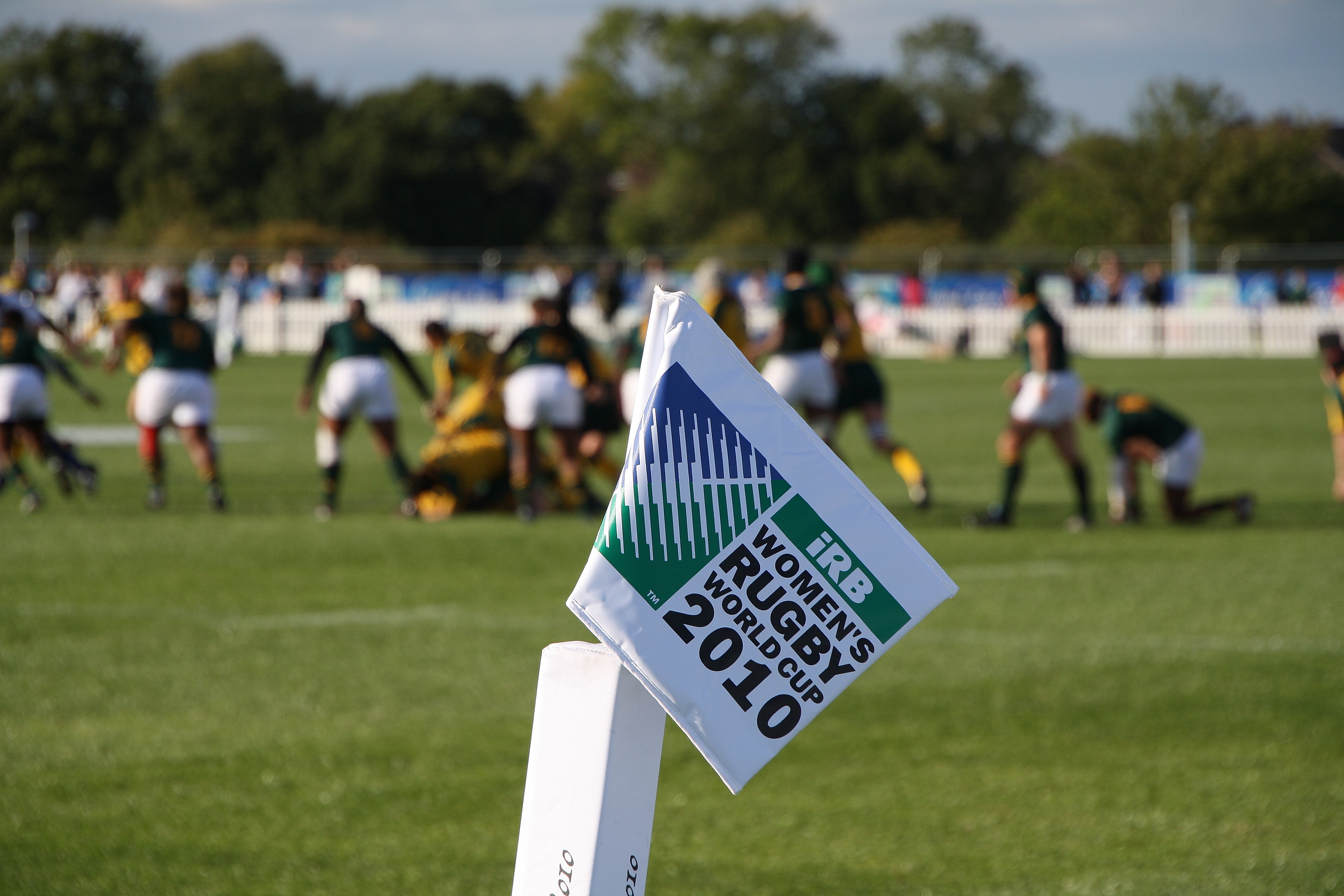
Women's Rugby World Cup – Guildford 2010

Defending champions New Zealand, hosts and 2006 runners-up England and 2006 bronze winners France all ranked top seeds in their pool. Teams played each other in each pool on a round robin basis, while match points were awarded according to the international standards: 4 points for a win, 2 points for a draw, 1 point for scoring 4 or more tries or for losing by 7 or less than 7 points.
At the end of the pool stage, the teams in a pool were ranked according to their cumulative match points. If two or more teams had been level, the following criteria would have been used in this order until one of the teams could be determined as the higher ranked:

- the winner of the match between the two tied teams;
- the team with the best points difference;
- the team with the best tries difference;
- the team with more scored points;
- the team with more scored tries;
- a toss of coin.

=== Ranking finals ===
The teams were seeded based on the position in which they finished in their respective pools and the points scored during the pool stage. The three pool winners and the best runner-up went through to the semi-finals. The other two runners-up and the best two 3rd-place finishers went into a sort of a competition for 5th place, whilst the bottom three teams competed for 9th place.
The ranking finals were set as it follows:

- 1st seed vs 4th seed;
- 2nd seed vs 3rd seed;
- 5th seed vs 8th seed;
- 6th Seed vs 7th seed;
- 9th seed vs 12th seed;
- 10th seed vs 11th seed.

=== Finals ===
If teams had been tied at full-time, the winner would have been determined through a 10-minutes extra time (the first team to score any points would have been declared the winner) or eventually a kicking competition (five players from each team would have kicked from three different points on the 22-metre line).

== World Cup tournament ==
=== Pool stage ===
Qualified for rankings 1–4 semi-finals
Qualified for rankings 5–8 semi-finals
Qualified for rankings 9–12 semi-finals

==== Pool A ====
Po	Nation	Pl	Wo	Dr	Lo	Pf	Pa	Pd	Tf	Ta	Bp	Tp
1	New Zealand	3	3	0	0	128	16	+112	22	2	3	15
2	Australia	3	2	0	1	93	44	+49	14	8	2	10
3	South Africa	3	1	0	2	18	127	−109	3	19	0	4
4	Wales	3	0	0	3	30	82	−52	4	14	1	1

20 August 2010

Australia	26–12	Wales
Tries: Nicole Beck 6'; Sharni Williams 16'; Cobie-Jane Morgan 23'; Tricia Brown 79'; Cons: Nicole Beck 6', 16', 23'	Report	Tries: Penalty try 4'; Lowri Harries 70'; Con: Non Evans 4'

Surrey Sports Park, Guildford, South East England
Referee: Javier Mancuso (Argentina)

20 August 2010

New Zealand	55–3	South Africa
Tries: Carla Hohepa 4', 17', 54'; Fiao'o Fa'amausili 7'; Kelly Brazier 12'; Huriana Manuel 22', 32'; Renee Wickliffe 44'; Casey Robertson 68'; Cons: Kelly Brazier 5', 8', 13', 23', 69'	Report	Pen: Zandile Nojoko 65'

Surrey Sports Park, Guildford, South East England
Referee: Andrew McMenemy (Scotland)

24 August 2010

South Africa	15–10	Wales
Tries: Namhla Siyolo 30'; Charmaine Kayser 40'; Zandile Nojoko 65'	Report	Try: Ceri Redman 78'; Con: Non Evans 79'; Pen: Non Evans 71'

Surrey Sports Park, Guildford, South East England
Referee: Joyce Henry (Canada)

24 August 2010

Australia	5–32	New Zealand
Try: Lindsay Morgan 8'	Report	Tries: Fiao'o Fa'amausili 14'; Carla Hohepa 20'; Justine Lavea 22', 29'; Victoria Blackledge 41'; Huriana Manuel 62'; Con: Rebecca Hull 21'

Surrey Sports Park, Guildford, South East England
Referee: Dana Teagarden (USA)

28 August 2010

New Zealand	41–8	Wales
Tries: Kelly Brazier 6', 20', 45'; Rebecca Hull 23'; Victoria Grant 49'; Halie Hurring 51'; Monalisa Codling 69'; Cons: Rebecca Hull 24'; Kelly Brazier 50'; Kendra Cocksedge 70'	Report	Try: Caryl James 38'; Pen: Non Evans 12'

Surrey Sports Park, Guildford, South East England
Referee: Clare Daniels (England)

28 August 2010

Australia	62–0	South Africa
Tries: Kristy Giteau 5'; Tricia Brown 18'; Debby Hodgkinson 26'; Lindsay Morgan 29', 53'; Alexandra Hargreaves 43'; Sharni Williams 48', 80'; Cobie-Jane Morgan 62'; Cons: Nicole Beck 6', 19', 27', 30', 44', 49', 80'; Pen: Nicole Beck 15'	Report

Surrey Sports Park, Guildford, South East England
Referee: David Keane (Ireland)

==== Pool B ====
Po	Nation	Pl	Wo	Dr	Lo	Pf	Pa	Pd	Tf	Ta	Bp	Tp
1	England	3	3	0	0	146	10	+136	22	2	3	15
2	Ireland	3	2	0	1	59	42	+17	11	6	2	10
3	United States	3	1	0	2	73	59	+14	11	10	1	5
4	Kazakhstan	3	0	0	3	3	170	−167	0	26	0	0

20 August 2010

Kazakhstan	0–51	United States
	Report	Tries: Nathalie Marchino 5', 73'; Christy Ringgenberg 44', 68'; Ashley Kmiecik 51'; Phaidra Knight 59'; Amy Daniels 70'; Cons: Christy Ringgenberg 6', 45', 52', 69', 74'; Pens: Christy Ringgenberg 4', 35'

Surrey Sports Park, Guildford, South East England
Referee: Nicky Inwood (New Zealand)

20 August 2010

England	27–0	Ireland
Tries: Fiona Pocock 9'; Katherine Merchant 37'; Amy Turner 56'; Margaret Alphonsi 79'; Cons: Katy McLean 10', 80'; Pen: Katy McLean 75'	Report

Surrey Sports Park, Guildford, South East England
Referee: Sarah Corrigan (Australia)

24 August 2010

Ireland	22–12	United States
Tries: Joy Neville 6', 45'; Niamh Briggs 35'; Tania Rosser 53'; Con: Niamh Briggs 54'	Report	Tries: Jamie Burke 17'; Venesha McGee 73'; Con: Melissa Kanuk 18'

Surrey Sports Park, Guildford, South East England
Referee: Sébastien Minery (France)

24 August 2010

England	82–0	Kazakhstan
Tries: Fiona Pocock 4', 54', 63'; Charlotte Barras 10', 22', 79'; Sarah Beale 25'; Katherine Merchant 34'; Rachael Burford 38'; La Toya Mason 44'; Rosemarie Crowley 67'; Amber Penrith 74'; Cons: Katy McLean 5', 11', 22', 26', 35', 39', 45'; La Toya Mason 55', 64', 67', 75'	Report

Surrey Sports Park, Guildford, South East England
Referee: Javier Mancuso (Argentina)

28 August 2010

Ireland	37–3	Kazakhstan
Tries: Niamh Briggs 2'; Joy Neville 16', 68'; Louise Beamish 24'; Orla Brennan 32'; Eliza Downey 42'; Kate O'Loughlin 63'; Con: Niamh Briggs 17'	Report	Pen: Aigerym Daurembayeva 49'

Surrey Sports Park, Guildford, South East England
Referee: Andrew McMenemy (Scotland)

28 August 2010

England	37–10	United States
Tries: Danielle Waterman 4', 38'; Katherine Merchant 30'; Emily Scarratt 51'; Amber Penrith 68'; Margaret Alphonsi 76'; Cons: Katy McLean 39', 77'; Pen: Katy McLean 9'	Report	Tries: Nathalie Marchino 18'; Kim Magrini 24'

Surrey Sports Park, Guildford, South East England
Referee: Nicky Inwood (New Zealand)

==== Pool C ====
Po	Nation	Pl	Wo	Dr	Lo	Pf	Pa	Pd	Tf	Ta	Bp	Tp
1	France	3	3	0	0	55	24	+31	10	2	1	13
2	Canada	3	2	0	1	85	43	+42	12	7	2	10
3	Scotland	3	1	0	2	49	59	−10	8	9	1	5
4	Sweden	3	0	0	3	24	87	−63	2	14	1	1

20 August 2010

Canada	37–10	Scotland
Tries: Barbara Mervin 10'; Mandy Marchak 21', 41'; Maria Gallo 38'; Heather Moyse 51'; Cons: Anna Schnell 22', 39', 52'; Pens: Anna Schnell 7', 18'	Report	Tries: Lucy Millard 49'; Lindsay Wheeler 64'

Surrey Sports Park, Guildford, South East England
Referee: Clare Daniels (England)

20 August 2010

France	15–9	Sweden
Tries: Sandra Rabier 8'; Claire Canal 31', 68'	Report	Pens: Ulrika Anderson Hall 21', 27', 40'

Surrey Sports Park, Guildford, South East England
Referee: Sherry Trumbull (Canada)

24 August 2010

France	17–7	Scotland
Tries: Élodie Poublan 4'; Marie-Charlotte Hebel 14'; Sandrine Agricole 36'; Con: Aurélie Bailon 37'	Report	Try: Lucy Millard 41'; Con: Nicola Halfpenny 42'

Surrey Sports Park, Guildford, South East England
Referee: David Keane (Ireland)

24 August 2010

Canada	40–10	Sweden
Tries: Mandy Marchak 1'; Ashley Steacy 11', 41'; Heather Moyse 16', 23', 72'; Cons: Anna Schnell 2', 12', 17', 42', 73'	Report	Try: Charlotta Westin Vines 34'; Con: Ulrika Andersson Hall 35'; Pen: Ulrika Andersson Hall 21'

Surrey Sports Park, Guildford, South East England
Referee: Gabriel Lee (Hong Kong)

28 August 2010

Scotland	32–5	Sweden
Tries: Lindsay Wheeler 2'; Lucy Millard 13', 55'; Donna Kennedy 21'; Katy Green 47'; Cons: Nicola Halfpenny 14', 56'; Pen: Nicola Halfpenny 27'	Report	Try: Johanna Norberg 72'

Surrey Sports Park, Guildford, South East England
Referee: Sarah Corrigan (Australia)

28 August 2010

Canada	8–23	France
Try: Kelly Russell 36'; Pen: Anna Schnell 14'	Report	Tries: Lucille Godiveau 9', 70'; Cyrielle Bouisset 29'; Claire Canal 45'; Pen: Aurélie Bailon 20'

Surrey Sports Park, Guildford, South East England
Referee: Dana Teagarden (USA)

=== Ranking finals ===
==== 9th–12th place ====
Semi-finals
1 September - Guildford
South Africa	25
Kazakhstan	10
1 September - Guildford
Wales	32
Sweden	10

Final
5 September - Guildford
South Africa	17
Wales	29
Third place
5 September - Guildford
Sweden	8
Kazakhstan	12

===== Semi-finals =====
1 September 2010

South Africa	25–10	Kazakhstan
Tries: Phumeza Gadu 39'; Zenay Jordaan 76'; Cherne Roberts 80'; Pens: Zandile Nojoko 14', 64'; Cons: Zandile Nojoko 40', 77'	Report	Tries: Irina Amossova 33'; Alfiya Mustafina 50'

Surrey Sports Park, Guildford
Referee: David Keane (Ireland)

1 September 2010

Wales	32–10	Sweden
Tries: Caryl James 17'; Sioned Harries 25', 44'; Mellissa Berry 38'; Laura Prosser 71'; Jamie Kift 77'; Con: Awen Thomas 26'	Report	Try: Charlotta Westin-Vines 13'; Pen: Lina Norman 34'; Con: Lina Norman 54'

Surrey Sports Park, Guildford
Referee: Sherry Trumbull (Canada)

===== 11th place match =====
5 September 2010

Sweden	8–12	Kazakhstan
Try: Frida Ryberg 31'; Pen: Ulrika Andersson-Hall 39'	Report	Tries: Lyudmila Sherer 6'; Anna Yakovleva 19'; Con: Aigerym Daurembayeva 20'

Surrey Sports Park, Guildford
Referee: Gabriel Lee (Hong Kong)

===== 9th place match =====
5 September 2010

South Africa	17–29	Wales
Tries: Zenay Jordaan 51'; Charmaine Kayser 69'; Phumeza Gadu 80+4'; Con: Yolanda Meiring 80+5'	Report	Tries: Naomi Thomas 5', 38'; Mared Evans 40', 41'; Rhian Bowden 61'; Cons: Awen Thomas 40+1', 42'

Surrey Sports Park, Guildford
Referee: Andrew McMenemy (Scotland)

==== 5th–8th place ====
Semi-finals
1 September - Guildford
Canada	41
Scotland	0
1 September - Guildford
Ireland	3
United States	40

Final
5 September - Guildford
Canada	20
United States	23
Third place
5 September - Guildford
Scotland	8
Ireland	32

===== Semi-finals =====
1 September 2010

Canada	41–0	Scotland
Tries: Heather Moyse 4', 6'; Maria Gallo 18'; Mandy Marchak 61'; Cheryl Phillips 62', 72'; Pen: Anna Schnell 43'; Cons: Anna Schnell 4', 7', 61', 63'	Report

Surrey Sports Park, Guildford
Referee: Javier Mancuso (Argentina)

1 September 2010

Ireland	3–40	United States
Pen: Niamh Briggs 29'	Report	Tries: Victoria Folayan 11', Penalty try 20', 72'; Amy Daniels 36', 56'; Vanesha McGee 75'; Cons: Christy Ringgenberg 12', 21', 37', 57', 76'

Surrey Sports Park, Guildford
Referee: Sébastien Minery (France)

===== 7th place match =====
5 September 2010

Scotland	8–32	Ireland
Try: Donna Kennedy 19'; Pen: Nicola Halfpenny 36'	Report	Tries: Eliza Downey 9', 44'; Niamh Briggs 12', 65'; Orla Brennan 53'; Pen: Niamh Briggs 3'; Cons: Niamh Briggs 13', 54'

Surrey Sports Park, Guildford
Referee: Joyce Henry (Canada)

===== 5th place match =====
5 September 2010

Canada	20–23	United States
Tries: Heather Moyse 7'; Megan Gibbs 35'; Pens: Anna Schnell 3', 66'; Cons: Anna Schnell 8', 36'	Report	Tries: Ashley English 30'; Lynelle Kugler 42'; Vanesha McGee 47'; Pens: Christy Ringgenberg 16', 20'; Con: Christy Ringgenberg 43'

Surrey Sports Park, Guildford
Referee: Sébastien Minery (France)

==== Semi-finals and Final ====
Semi-finals
1 September - London
New Zealand	45
France	7
1 September - London
England	15
Australia	0

Final
5 September - London
New Zealand	13
England	10
Third place
5 September - London
France	8
Australia	22

===== Semi-finals =====
1 September 2010

New Zealand	45–7	France
Tries: Carla Hohepa 9', 37'; Victoria Grant 23'; Huriana Manuel 27'; Renee Wickliffe 35'; Anna Richards 43'; Joan Sione 66'; Cons: Kelly Brazier 28', 36', 38', 44'; Emma Jensen 67'	Report	Try: Laetitia Salles 41'; Con: Aurélie Bailon 42'

Twickenham Stoop
Referee: Claire Daniels (England)

1 September 2010

England	15–0	Australia
Tries: Catherine Spencer 6'; Danielle Waterman 22'; Pen: Alice Richardson 78'; Con: Katy McLean 7'	Report

Twickenham Stoop
Referee: Nicky Inwood (New Zealand)

===== 3rd place match =====
5 September 2010

France	8–22	Australia
Try: Laetitia Salles 74'; Pen: Aurélie Bailon 7'	Report	Tries: Cobie-Jane Morgan 14', 31'; Rebecca Trethowan 27'; Tricia Brown 37'; Con: Nicole Beck 33'

Twickenham Stoop
Referee: Dana Teagarden (USA)

===== Final =====
5 September 2010

New Zealand	13–10	England
Try: Carla Hohepa 33'; Pens: Kelly Brazier 56', 66'; Con: Kelly Brazier 34'	Report	Try: Charlotte Barras 61'; Pen: Katy McLean 43'; Con: Katy McLean 62'

Twickenham Stoop
Referee: Sarah Corrigan (Australia)

== Statistics ==
=== Teams ===
Points	Team	Matches	Tries	Conversions	Penalties	Drops	Yellow card	Red card
186	New Zealand	5	30	15	2	0	6	0
171	England	5	25	17	4	0	1	0
146	Canada	5	20	14	6	0	7	0
136	United States	5	20	12	4	0	5	0
115	Australia	5	18	11	1	0	7	0
94	Ireland	5	16	4	2	0	4	0
91	Wales	5	15	5	2	0	3	0
70	France	5	12	2	2	0	6	0
60	South Africa	5	9	3	3	0	9	0
57	Scotland	5	9	3	2	0	1	0
42	Sweden	5	4	2	6	0	5	0
25	Kazakhstan	5	4	1	1	0	10	1

=== Individual leading point scorers ===
Points	Name	Team	Position	Appearances	Tries	Conversions	Penalties	Drops
48	Kelly Brazier	New Zealand	Centre/Wing	5	4	11	1	0
46	Anna Schnell	Canada	Fly-half	5	0	14	6	0
44	Christy Ringgenberg	United States	Full back	5	2	11	4	0
35	Carla Hohepa	New Zealand	Wing	5	7	0	0	0
35	Heather Moyse	Canada	Wing	5	7	0	0	0
35	Katy McLean	England	Fly-half	4	0	11	2	0
34	Niamh Briggs	Ireland	Full back	5	4	4	3	0
30	Nichole Beck	Australia	Fly-half	4	1	11	1	0
20	Charlotte Barras	England	Centre	4	4	0	0	0
20	Huriana Manuel	New Zealand	Centre	5	4	0	0	0
20	Mandy Marchak	Canada	Centre	5	4	0	0	0
20	Lucy Millard	Scotland	Centre	5	4	0	0	0
20	Cobie-Jane Morgan	Australia	Centre	5	4	0	0	0
20	Joy Neville	Ireland	No 8	4	4	0	0	0
20	Fiona Pocock	England	Wing	4	4	0	0	0
18	Zandile Nojoko	South Africa	Full back	5	1	3	2	0
17	Ulrika Anderson-Hall	Sweden	Fly-half	4	0	1	5	0

=== Individual leading try scorers ===
Rank	Name	Team	Tries
1	Carla Hohepa	New Zealand	7
1	Heather Moyse	Canada	7
3	Kelly Brazier	New Zealand	4
3	Niamh Briggs	Ireland	4
3	Cobie-Jane Morgan	Australia	4
3	Huriana Manuel	New Zealand	4
3	Fiona Pocock	England	4
3	Joy Neville	Ireland	4
3	Charlotte Barras	England	4
3	Mandy Marchak	Canada	4
3	Lucy Millard	Scotland	4

== Sources ==
- Rugby World Cup Women’s Stats Archive
- Women's Rugby Data

== See also ==
- Rugby World Cup
- Rugby World Cup Sevens
