= Céline =

Female given name

- Pronunciation: [selin]
- Gender: Female

Origin
- Language: Latin

Céline, sometimes spelled Celine, is a French female first name version of Latin origin, coming from Caelīna, the feminine form of the Roman cognomen Caelīnus, meaning "heavenly". Its equivalent in Spanish, Italian, and Portuguese is Celina. Céline was frequently chosen as a first name in honour of two Gallo-Roman saints closely associated with the beginnings of the French nation:

Saint Céline of Laon, mother of St Rémy, and Saint Céline of Meaux, a companion of St Geneviève; the feast day for both is 21 October.

Céline as a single name may refer to the French writer Louis-Ferdinand Céline, author of Journey to the End of the Night.

== List of notable people ==
- Céline Abgottspon (born 1995), Swiss ice hockey player
- Céline Allainmat (born 1982), French rugby union player
- Céline Allewaert, Belgian spongiologist
- Céline Amaudruz (born 1979), Swiss attorney, banker, and politician
- Céline Arnauld (1885–1952), Romanian writer
- Celine Axelos (1902–1992), Egyptian poet
- Céline Banza (born 1997), Congolese guitarist, singer, and songwriter
- Céline Bara (born 1978), French pornographic actress
- Céline Baril (born 1953), Canadian artist and filmmaker
- Céline Beigbeder (born 1975), French tennis player
- Céline Bellot (1970–2026), Canadian criminologist, lawyer, and professor
- Céline Bethmann (born 1998), German model
- Céline Bonacina (born 1975), French composer and saxophonist
- Céline Bonnet (born 1976), French swimmer
- Céline Bonnier (born 1965), French–Canadian actress
- Celine Borge (born 1998), Norwegian golfer
- Celine Borzecka (1833–1913), Russian Catholic nun
- Céline Boucher (born 1945), Canadian artist
- Céline Bousrez (born 1977), French duathlete and triathlete
- Céline Boutier (born 1993), French golfer
- Céline Buckens (born 1996), Belgian–British actress
- Céline Burkart (born 1995), Swiss badminton player
- Celine Byrne (born 1977), Irish soprano
- Celine Cairo (born 1990), Dutch singer and songwriter
- Céline Calvez (born 1979), French politician
- Céline Cassone, French ballet dancer
- Celine Cawley (1962–2008), Irish actress, model, and businesswoman
- Céline Chartrand (born 1962), Canadian athlete
- Céline Cohen (born 1967), Swiss tennis player
- Céline Couderc (born 1983), French freestyle swimmer
- Céline Cousteau (born 1972), French–American advocate, artist, author, documentarian, explorer, filmmaker, producer, and public speaker
- Céline Curiol (born 1975), French journalist and writer
- Céline Degrange (born 1978), French rhythmic gymnast
- Céline Delbecq (born 1986), Belgian actress and filmmaker
- Céline Dept (born 1999), Belgian influencer
- Céline Deville (born 1982), French soccer player
- Celine Dion (born 1968), Canadian singer and entrepreneur
- Celine Domingo (born 1999), Filipino volleyball player
- Céline Dumerc (born 1982), French basketball player
- Céline Emilian (1898–1983), French–born Romanian sculptor
- Céline Ferer (born 1991), French rugby union player
- Celine Frere, Swiss biologist
- Céline Frisch (born 1974), French harpsichordist
- Céline Galipeau (born 1957), Canadian news anchor
- Céline Garcia (born 1976), French rower
- Céline Gittens, Trinidadian ballet dancer
- Céline Goberville (born 1986), French sport shooter
- Céline Gounder (born 1977), American physician and medical journalist
- Céline Guivarch, French climate scientist
- Celine Haidar (born 2005), Lebanese soccer player
- Céline Haytayan, Canadian politician
- Celine Held (born 1990), American–British actress and filmmaker
- Celine Helgemo (born 1995), Norwegian singer and songwriter
- Céline Herbin (born 1982), French golfer
- Céline Hervieu (born 1993), French politician
- Céline Hervieux-Payette (born 1941), Canadian senator
- Céline Huyghebaert, French–born Canadian artist and writer
- Celine Kiernan (born 1967), Irish author
- Céline Koller (born 1996), Swiss curler
- Céline Laguarde (1873–1961), French photographer
- Céline of Laon, 5th-century French saint
- Céline Laporte (born 1984), French athlete
- Céline Lebrun (born 1976), French judoka
- Céline Lecompére (born 1983), French short-track speed skater
- Celine Lee (born 1994), Malaysian karateka
- Céline Lesage (born 1971), French murderer
- Céline Lomez (born 1953), Canadian actress and singer
- Céline Louche, New Zealand academic
- Celine Lundbye Kristiansen (born 1996), Danish handball player
- Celine Ma (born 1967), Hong Kong actress and singer
- Celine Manzuoli (born 1973), French para judoka
- Céline Marty (born 1976), French soccer player
- Céline Minard (born 1969), French writer
- Céline Monsarrat (born 1954), French actress
- Céline Montaland (1843–1891), French actress, dancer, and singer
- Celine Moody (born 1997), Australian rules football player
- Céline Naef (born 2005), Swiss tennis player
- Céline Narmadji (born 1964), Chadian activist
- Céline Oopa, French Polynesian politician
- Celine Prins (born 1984), Dutch–French entrepreneur, community coordinator, and strategy counsel
- Celine Rattray (born 1975), English film producer
- Céline Renooz (1840–1928), Belgian activist and writer
- Celine Rieder (born 2001), German swimmer
- Céline Roos (1953–2021), French–Canadian chess player
- Céline Sallette (born 1980), French actress
- Céline Schärer (born 1990), Swiss triathlete
- Céline Scheen (born 1976), Belgian classical soprano
- Céline Sciamma (born 1978), French filmmaker
- Céline Signori (born 1938), Canadian politician
- Celine Sivertsen (born 1993), Norwegian handball player
- Celine Solstad (born 1997), Norwegian handball player
- Celine Song (born 1988), Korean–born Canadian–American filmmaker
- Celine Tedenby (born 1999), Swedish ice hockey player
- Celine Tendobi (born 1974), Congolese gynecologist
- Céline Thiébault-Martinez (born 1974), French politician
- Céline Tran (born 1979), French actress, blogger, writer, martial artist, and pornographic actress
- Celine van Duijn (born 1991), Dutch diver
- Céline van Gerner (born 1994), Dutch artistic gymnast
- Celine Van Gestel (born 1997), Belgian volleyball player
- Céline Van Ouytsel, Belgian beauty queen
- Céline Van Severen (born 1993), Belgian racing cyclist
- Celine van Till (born 1991), Swiss para athlete
- Céline Vara (born 1984), Swiss–Italian politician
- Céline Verzeletti (born 1969), French trade unionist
- Céline Vinot (born 1996), Australian para badminton player
- Céline Walser (born 1998), Swiss squash player
- Céline Weber (born 1974), Swiss politician
- Céline Wilde (born 1990), German field hockey player
- Céline Yandza (1932–2013), Congolese politician
- Céline Yoda (born 1958), Burkinabé politician

== Pseudonyms and fictional characters ==
- Celine is the name of the female protagonist in the films "Before Sunrise", "Before Sunset" and "Before Midnight", played by Julie Delpy.
- Celine, a major character from the video game Fields of Mistria.
- Celine, a character in the video game Fire Emblem: Engage.
- Celine, a supporting character from the movie KPop Demon Hunters.
- Celine Verans, a minor character mentioned only by Mr. Rochester in Charlotte Brontë's classic novel Jane Eyre.
- Celine Jules, a character from the PlayStation video game Star Ocean: The Second Story.

== As a surname ==
=== Pseudonyms and fictional characters ===
- Louis-Ferdinand Céline, the pen name of Louis-Ferdinand Destouches (1894–1961), a French writer and doctor
- Hagbard Celine, character in the Illuminatus trilogy of books by Robert Shea and Robert Anton Wilson

== Other ==
- Celine (brand), formerly spelled Céline
