= 2010 Women's Rugby World Cup Pool C =

Pool C of the 2010 Women's Rugby World Cup was composed of 2006 World Cup semi-finalists France and Canada, Scotland and Sweden.

== Canada vs Scotland ==
20 August 2010

| Canada | 37 – 10 | Scotland |
| Tries: Barbara Mervin 10'; Mandy Marchak 21', 41'; Maria Gallo 38'; Heather Moyse 51'; Cons: Anna Schnell 22', 39', 52'; Pens: Anna Schnell 7', 18' | Report | Tries: Lucy Millard 49'; Lindsay Wheeler 64' |

Surrey Sports Park, Guildford, South East England
Referee: Clare Daniels (England)

CANADA:
| FB | 15 | Ashley Patzer |
| RW | 14 | Heather Moyse |
| OC | 13 | Mandy Marchak |
| IC | 12 | Sarah Ulmer |
| LW | 11 | Maria Gallo |
| FH | 10 | Anna Schnell | (substituted off) 79' |
| SH | 9 | Julia Sugawara |
| N8 | 8 | Kelly Russell |
| OF | 7 | Gillian Florence | (substituted off) 74' |
| BF | 6 | Barbara Mervin | (yellow card) 60' |
| RL | 5 | Megan Gibbs |
| LL | 4 | Paige Knauf |
| TP | 3 | Corinne Jacobsen |
| HK | 2 | Lesley McKenzie | (substituted off) 40+2' |
| LP | 1 | Leslie Cripps (C) |
Replacements:
| PR | 16 | Tabitha Stavrou | (substituted in) 53' |
| HK | 17 | Kimberley Donaldson | (substituted in) 40+2' (substituted off) 53' |
| N8 | 18 | Jennifer Kish | (substituted in) 74' |
| FL | 19 | Heather Jaques |
| SH | 20 | Laura Stoughton |
| FH | 21 | Brooke Hilditch | (substituted in) 79' |
| CE | 22 | Cheryl Phillips |
Coach:
(Canada) John Long

SCOTLAND:
| FB | 15 | Nicola Halfpenny |
| RW | 14 | Celia Hawthorn |
| OC | 13 | Lucy Millard |
| IC | 12 | Suzi Newton |
| LW | 11 | Veronica Fitzpatrick |
| FH | 10 | Erin Kerr |
| SH | 9 | Louise Dalgliesh | (substituted off) 56' |
| N8 | 8 | Susie Brown |
| OF | 7 | Donna Kennedy | (substituted off) 45' |
| BF | 6 | Lynne Reid (C) |
| RL | 5 | Lindsay Wheeler |
| LL | 4 | Gillian McCord | (substituted off) 79' |
| TP | 3 | Beth Dickens |
| HK | 2 | Sarah-Louise Walker | (substituted off) 56' |
| LP | 1 | Heather Lockhart |
Replacements:
| HK | 16 | Alison MacDonald | (substituted in) 56' |
| PR | 17 | Rosalind Murphy | (substituted in) 79' |
| FL | 18 | Ruth Slaven | (substituted in) 45' |
| FL | 19 | Keri Holdsworth |
| SH | 20 | Sarah Gill | (substituted in) 56' (substituted off) 80+6' |
| FH | 21 | Tanya Griffith | (substituted in) 80+6' |
| CE | 22 | Stephanie Johnston |
Coach:
(Scotland) Gary Parker

Touch judges:
David Keane (Ireland)
Debbie Innes (England)
Fourth official:
Will Halford (England)
Fifth official:
Paula Carter (England)

== France vs Sweden ==
20 August 2010

| France | 15 – 9 | Sweden |
| Tries: Sandra Rabier 8'; Claire Canal 31', 68' | Report | Pens: Ulrika Anderson Hall 21', 27', 40' |

Surrey Sports Park, Guildford, South East England
Referee: Sherry Trumbull (Canada)

FRANCE:
| FB | 15 | Élodie Poublan |
| RW | 14 | Céline Allainmat |
| OC | 13 | Sandrine Agricole |
| IC | 12 | Lucille Godiveau | (substituted off) 52' |
| LW | 11 | Anaïs Lagougine |
| FH | 10 | Audrey Parra |
| SH | 9 | Marie-Alice Yahe | (substituted off) 56' |
| N8 | 8 | Sandra Rabier (C) |
| OF | 7 | Marie-Charlotte Hebel |
| BF | 6 | Claire Canal |
| RL | 5 | Cyrielle Bouisset | (substituted off) 50' |
| LL | 4 | Hasna Rhamouni | (substituted off) 43' (substituted in) |
| TP | 3 | Nadège Labbey | (substituted off) 63' |
| HK | 2 | Laetitia Salles |
| LP | 1 | Stéphanie Loyer | (yellow card) 40' |
Replacements:
| HK | 16 | Gaëlle Mignot |
| PR | 17 | Céline Barthélémy | (substituted in) 43' (substituted off) (substituted in) 63' |
| FL | 18 | Aïda Ba | (substituted in) 50' |
| FL | 19 | Amandine Vaupre |
| SH | 20 | Stéphanie Provost | (substituted in) 56' |
| FH | 21 | Aurélie Bailon |
| WG | 22 | Caroline Ladagnous | (substituted in) 52' |
Coach:
(France) Christian Galonnier

SWEDEN:
| FB | 15 | Jessica Melin | (substituted off) 69' |
| RW | 14 | Charlotta Westin Vines |
| OC | 13 | Ninni Johansson Giebat |
| IC | 12 | Johanna Norberg |
| LW | 11 | Karin Hedlund |
| FH | 10 | Ulrika Andersson Hall (C) | (substituted off) 77' |
| SH | 9 | Frida Ryberg |
| N8 | 8 | Elisabeth Ygge |
| OF | 7 | Anna Lena Swartz | (substituted off) 56' |
| BF | 6 | Elisabeth Österberg |
| RL | 5 | Katarina Boman | (substituted off) 62' |
| LL | 4 | Madeleine Lahti | (yellow card) 59' |
| TP | 3 | Henrietta Högberg | (substituted off) 56' |
| HK | 2 | Sara Åkerman | (substituted off) 37' |
| LP | 1 | Jennie Öhman | (substituted off) 69' |
Replacements:
| PR | 16 | Susanne Olovsson | (substituted in) 56' |
| PR | 17 | Viktoria Svangren | (substituted in) 69' |
| HK | 18 | Erica Storckenfeldt | (substituted in) 37' |
| N8 | 19 | Anna Larsson | (substituted in) 62' |
| FL | 20 | Erika Andersson | (substituted in) 56' |
| SH | 21 | Sofia Torstensson | (substituted in) 77' |
| FB | 22 | Lina Norman | (substituted in) 69' |
Coach:
(Sweden) Jonas Ahl

Touch judges:
David Keane (Ireland)
Debbie Innes (England)
Fourth official:
Will Halford (England)
Fifth official:
Rebecca Patrick (England)

== France vs Scotland ==
24 August 2010

| France | 17 – 7 | Scotland |
| Tries: Élodie Poublan 4'; Marie-Charlotte Hebel 14'; Sandrine Agricole 36'; Con: Aurélie Bailon 37' | Report | Try: Lucy Millard 41'; Con: Nicola Halfpenny 42' |

Surrey Sports Park, Guildford, South East England
Referee: David Keane (Ireland)

FRANCE:
| FB | 15 | Élodie Poublan |
| RW | 14 | Céline Allainmat | (substituted off) 55' |
| OC | 13 | Sandrine Agricole |
| IC | 12 | Lucille Godiveau |
| LW | 11 | Caroline Ladagnous |
| FH | 10 | Aurélie Bailon |
| SH | 9 | Marie-Alice Yahe | (substituted off) 62' |
| N8 | 8 | Sandra Rabier (C) | (substituted off) 51' |
| OF | 7 | Marie-Charlotte Hebel | (substituted off) 58' |
| BF | 6 | Amandine Vaupre |
| RL | 5 | Cyrielle Bouisset |
| LL | 4 | Clémence Audebert | (substituted off) 75' |
| TP | 3 | Céline Barthélémy | (substituted off) 67' |
| HK | 2 | Gaëlle Mignot |
| LP | 1 | Stéphanie Loyer | (substituted off) 41' (substituted in) 75' |
Replacements:
| HK | 16 | Clémence Ollivier | (substituted in) 41' |
| PR | 17 | Nadège Labbey | (substituted in) 67' (yellow card) 70' |
| FL | 18 | Manon André | (substituted in) 58' |
| FL | 19 | Claire Canal | (substituted in) 51' |
| SH | 20 | Stéphanie Provost | (substituted in) 62' |
| FH | 21 | Audrey Parra |
| WG | 22 | Fanny Horta | (substituted in) 55' |
Coach:
(France) Christian Galonnier

SCOTLAND:
| FB | 15 | Nicola Halfpenny |
| RW | 14 | Celia Hawthorn | (substituted off) 45' |
| OC | 13 | Lucy Millard | (substituted off) 71' |
| IC | 12 | Veronica Fitzpatrick |
| LW | 11 | Linsey Douglas |
| FH | 10 | Erin Kerr |
| SH | 9 | Louise Dalgliesh |
| N8 | 8 | Donna Kennedy |
| OF | 7 | Ruth Slaven |
| BF | 6 | Lynne Reid (C) |
| RL | 5 | Lindsay Wheeler |
| LL | 4 | Susie Brown |
| TP | 3 | Beth Dickens | (substituted off) 58' |
| HK | 2 | Sarah-Louise Walker |
| LP | 1 | Heather Lockhart |
Replacements:
| HK | 16 | Alison MacDonald |
| LK | 17 | Gillian McCord | (substituted in) 58' |
| LK | 18 | Louise Moffat |
| PR | 19 | Rosalind Murphy |
| FH | 20 | Tanya Griffith |
| CE | 21 | Stephanie Johnston | (substituted in) 71' |
| WG | 22 | Katy Green | (substituted in) 45' |
Coach:
(Scotland) Gary Parker

Touch judges:
Sarah Corrigan (Australia)
Kerstin Ljungdahl (Germany)
Fourth official:
Andrea Ttofa (England)
Fifth official:
Sarah Cox (England)

== Canada vs Sweden ==
24 August 2010

| Canada | 40 – 10 | Sweden |
| Tries: Mandy Marchak 1'; Ashley Patzer 11', 41'; Heather Moyse 16', 23', 72'; Cons: Anna Schnell 2', 12', 17', 42', 73' | Report | Try: Charlotta Westin Vines 34'; Con: Ulrika Andersson Hall 35'; Pen: Ulrika Andersson Hall 21' |

Surrey Sports Park, Guildford, South East England
Referee: Gabriel Lee (Hong Kong)

CANADA:
| FB | 15 | Ashley Patzer |
| RW | 14 | Heather Moyse |
| OC | 13 | Mandy Marchak | (yellow card) 79' |
| IC | 12 | Sarah Ulmer | (substituted off) 48' |
| LW | 11 | Maria Gallo | (substituted off) 69' |
| FH | 10 | Anna Schnell |
| SH | 9 | Julia Sugawara | (substituted off) 54' |
| N8 | 8 | Kelly Russell |
| OF | 7 | Gillian Florence | (substituted off) 58' |
| BF | 6 | Barbara Mervin | (substituted off) 32' |
| RL | 5 | Megan Gibbs |
| LL | 4 | Paige Knauf | (substituted off) 67' (substituted in) 69' |
| TP | 3 | Marlene Donaldson | (yellow card) 58' |
| HK | 2 | Lesly McKenzie | (substituted off) 47' |
| LP | 1 | Leslie Cripps (C) | (substituted off) 41' (substituted in) 67' (substituted off) 69' |
Replacements:
| PR | 16 | Tabitha Stavrou | (substituted in) 41' |
| HK | 17 | Kimberley Donaldson | (substituted in) 47' |
| N8 | 18 | Jennifer Kish | (substituted in) 58' |
| FL | 19 | Heather Jaques | (substituted in) 32' |
| SH | 20 | Laura Stoughton | (substituted in) 54' |
| FH | 21 | Brooke Hilditch | (substituted in) 48' |
| WG | 22 | Brittany Waters | (substituted in) 69' |
Coach:
(Canada) John Long

SWEDEN:
| FB | 15 | Anna Holmström | (substituted off) 66' |
| RW | 14 | Charlotta Westin Vines | (substituted off) 66' |
| OC | 13 | Erika Andersson |
| IC | 12 | Johanna Norberg |
| LW | 11 | Karin Hedlund | (substituted off) 41' |
| FH | 10 | Ulrika Andersson Hall (C) |
| SH | 9 | Frida Ryberg |
| N8 | 8 | Elisabeth Ygge | (substituted off) 52' (substituted in) 55' |
| OF | 7 | Jessica Berntsson | (substituted off) 58' |
| BF | 6 | Elisabeth Österberg |
| RL | 5 | Sofi Björkman |
| LL | 4 | Anna Larsson | (substituted off) 36' |
| TP | 3 | Viktoria Svangren | (substituted off) 47' |
| HK | 2 | Erica Storckenfeldt |
| LP | 1 | Susanne Olovsson | (substituted off) 47' |
Replacements:
| PR | 16 | Jennie Öhman | (substituted in) 47' |
| PR | 17 | Henrietta Högberg | (substituted in) 47' |
| HK | 18 | Sara Åkerman | (substituted in) 52' (substituted off) 55' (substituted in) 58' |
| SH | 19 | Sofia Torstensson | (substituted in) 66' |
| LK | 20 | Madeleine Lahti | (substituted in) 36' |
| FB | 21 | Lina Norman | (substituted in) 66' |
| WG | 22 | Jennifer Lindholm | (substituted in) 41' |
Coach:
(Sweden) Jonas Ahl

Touch judges:
Nicky Inwood (New Zealand)
Debbie Innes (England)
Fourth official:
Alan Biggs (England)
Fifth official:
Catherine Lewis (England)

== Scotland vs Sweden ==
28 August 2010

| Scotland | 32 – 5 | Sweden |
| Tries: Lindsay Wheeler 2'; Lucy Millard 13', 55'; Donna Kennedy 21'; Katy Green 47'; Cons: Nicola Halfpenny 14', 56'; Pen: Nicola Halfpenny 27' | Report | Try: Johanna Norberg 72' |

Surrey Sports Park, Guildford, South East England
Referee: Sarah Corrigan (Australia)

SCOTLAND:
| FB | 15 | Nicola Halfpenny | (substituted off) 56' |
| RW | 14 | Katy Green |
| OC | 13 | Lucy Millard |
| IC | 12 | Veronica Fitzpatrick |
| LW | 11 | Stephanie Johnston |
| FH | 10 | Erin Kerr | (substituted off) 67' |
| SH | 9 | Sarah Gill | (substituted off) 75' |
| N8 | 8 | Donna Kennedy | (substituted off) 65' |
| OF | 7 | Ruth Slaven |
| BF | 6 | Lynne Reid (C) |
| RL | 5 | Lindsay Wheeler | (substituted off) 62' |
| LL | 4 | Susie Brown |
| TP | 3 | Gillian McCord | (substituted off) 62' |
| HK | 2 | Alison MacDonald | (substituted off) 75' |
| LP | 1 | Heather Lockhart |
Replacements:
| HK | 16 | Sarah-Louise Walker | (substituted in) 75' |
| PR | 17 | Beth Dickens | (substituted in) 62' |
| LK | 18 | Louise Moffat | (substituted in) 62' |
| PR | 19 | Rosalind Murphy | (substituted in) 65' |
| SH | 20 | Louise Dalgliesh | (substituted in) 75' |
| FH | 21 | Tanya Griffith | (substituted in) 67' |
| CE | 22 | Suzi Newton | (substituted in) 56' |
Coach:
(Scotland) Gary Parker

SWEDEN:
| FB | 15 | Jessica Melin |
| RW | 14 | Charlotta Westin Vines | (substituted off) 57' |
| OC | 13 | Ninni Giebat Johansson |
| IC | 12 | Johanna Norberg |
| LW | 11 | Karin Hedlund |
| FH | 10 | Ulrika Andersson Hall (C) |
| SH | 9 | Frida Ryberg | (substituted off) 62' |
| N8 | 8 | Elisabeth Ygge |
| OF | 7 | Anna Lena Swartz | (substituted off) 47' |
| BF | 6 | Elisabeth Österberg |
| RL | 5 | Katarina Boman | (substituted off) 47' |
| LL | 4 | Madeleine Lahti | (substituted off) 25' (substituted in) 32' |
| TP | 3 | Henrietta Högberg | (substituted off) 57' |
| HK | 2 | Sara Åkerman | (substituted off) 51' |
| LP | 1 | Jennie Öhman | (yellow card) 24' (substituted off) 57' |
Replacements:
| PR | 16 | Susanne Olovsson | (substituted in) 25' (substituted off) 32' (substituted in) 57' |
| HK | 17 | Erica Storckenfeldt | (substituted in) 51' |
| PR | 18 | Viktoria Svangren | (substituted in) 57' |
| LK | 19 | Sofi Björkman | (substituted in) 47' |
| FL | 20 | Erika Andersson | (substituted in) 47' |
| SH | 21 | Sofia Torstensson | (substituted in) 62' |
| WG | 22 | Jennifer Lindholm | (substituted in) 57' |
Coach:
(Sweden) Jonas Ahl

Touch judges:
Javier Mancuso (Argentina)
Sébastien Minery (France)
Fourth official:
Moira Pritchard (England)
Fifth official:
Jane Pizii (England)

== Canada vs France ==
28 August 2010

| Canada | 8 – 23 | France |
| Try: Kelly Russell 36'; Pen: Anna Schnell 14' | Report | Tries: Lucille Godiveau 9', 70'; Cyrielle Bouisset 29'; Claire Canal 45'; Pen: Aurélie Bailon 20' |

Surrey Sports Park, Guildford, South East England
Referee: Dana Teagarden (USA)

CANADA:
| FB | 15 | Ashley Patzer | (substituted off) 37' |
| RW | 14 | Heather Moyse |
| OC | 13 | Mandy Marchak |
| IC | 12 | Sarah Ulmer |
| LW | 11 | Maria Gallo |
| FH | 10 | Anna Schnell | (substituted off) 53' |
| SH | 9 | Julia Sugawara | (substituted off) 76' |
| N8 | 8 | Kelly Russell |
| OF | 7 | Gillian Florence | (substituted off) 47' (substituted in) 54' |
| BF | 6 | Barbara Mervin | (substituted off) 33' |
| RL | 5 | Paige Knauf |
| LL | 4 | Megan Gibbs |
| TP | 3 | Corinne Jacobsen | (substituted off) 65' |
| HK | 2 | Lesly McKenzie | (substituted off) 37' |
| LP | 1 | Leslie Cripps (C) |
Replacements:
| PR | 16 | Marlene Donaldson | (substituted in) 47' (substituted off) 54' (substituted in) 65' |
| HK | 17 | Kimberly Donaldson | (substituted in) 37' (yellow card) 45' |
| FL | 18 | Heather Jaques | (substituted in) 33' (substituted off) 37' |
| N8 | 19 | Jennifer Kish | (substituted in) 37' |
| SH | 20 | Laura Stoughton | (substituted in) 76' |
| FH | 21 | Brooke Hilditch | (substituted in) 53' |
| CE | 22 | Cheryl Phillips | (substituted in) 37' |
Coach:
(Canada) John Long

FRANCE:
| FB | 15 | Élodie Poublan |
| RW | 14 | Céline Allainmat | (substituted off) 41' |
| OC | 13 | Sandrine Agricole (C) | (yellow card) 36' |
| IC | 12 | Lucille Godiveau |
| LW | 11 | Caroline Ladagnous |
| FH | 10 | Aurélie Bailon | (substituted off) 76' |
| SH | 9 | Marie-Alice Yahe |
| N8 | 8 | Claire Canal |
| OF | 7 | Marie-Charlotte Hebel |
| BF | 6 | Amandine Vaupre | (substituted off) 49' |
| RL | 5 | Cyrielle Bouisset |
| LL | 4 | Hasna Rhamouni | (substituted off) 49' |
| TP | 3 | Nadège Labbey |
| HK | 2 | Laetitia Salles | (substituted off) 61' |
| LP | 1 | Stéphanie Loyer |
Replacements:
| HK | 16 | Gaëlle Mignot | (substituted in) 61' |
| PR | 17 | Céline Barthélémy |
| FL | 18 | Aïda Ba | (substituted in) 49' |
| N8 | 19 | Sandra Rabier | (substituted in) 49' |
| SH | 20 | Stéphanie Provost |
| FH | 21 | Audrey Parra | (substituted in) 76' |
| WG | 22 | Fanny Horta | (substituted in) 41' |
Coach:
(France) Christian Galonnier

Touch judges:
Javier Mancuso (Argentina)
Debbie Innes (England)
Fourth official:
Ed Turnill (England)
Fifth official:
Catherine Lewis (England)
