= Merv (disambiguation) =

Merv is a city in Turkmenistan.

Merv is also a nickname for Mervin or Mervyn:

== People ==
- Merv Batt, birth name of professional wrestler Steve Rickard
- Merv Connors (1914–2006), American baseball player
- Merv Cross (1941–2023), Australian rugby league player
- Merv Denton (1919–1980), Australian rugby league player
- Merv Everett (1917–1988), Australian politician and judge
- Merv Gordon, New Zealand association footballer
- Merv Griffin (1925–2007), American TV personality
- Merv Harvey (1918–1995), Australian cricketer
- Merv Hicks (born 1943), Welsh rugby union and rugby league player
- Merv Hobbs (born 1942), Australian rules footballer
- Merv Hughes (born 1961), Australian cricketer
- Merv Hunter (1926–2013), Australian politician
- Merv Jackson, American basketball player
- Merv Johnson (born 1923), Canadian politician
- Merv Krakau (born 1951), American National Football League player
- Merv Leitch (1926–1990), Canadian politician
- Merv McIntosh (1922–2010), Australian rules footballer
- Merv Mosely (born 1966), American football player
- Merv Neagle (1958–2012), Australian rules footballer
- Merv Pregulman (1922–2012), American National Football League player
- Merv Rettenmund (born 1943), American baseball player
- Merv Richards (1930–2018), New Zealand pole vaulter
- Merv Rose, Australian tennis player
- Merv Rylance, Australian rugby union player
- Merv Shea (1900–1953), American baseball player
- Merv Tweed (born 1955), Canadian politician
- Merv Wallace (1916–2008), New Zealand cricketer
- Merv Warren, American musician and record producer
- Merv Wellington (1940–2003), New Zealand politician
- Merv Wood, Australian rower

== Fictional characters ==
- Merv Pumpkinhead, in Neil Gaiman's The Sandman series
- "Merv the Perv", a recurring character on Saturday Night Live

== Other uses ==
- Merv (East Syriac ecclesiastical province), an East Syriac region circa 5th–11th centuries
- Merv (film), an American romantic comedy film
- Minimum efficiency reporting value (MERV), a measurement scale for the effectiveness of air filters
