= Mervin =

Mervin may refer to:

== People ==
- Mervin (given name), a list of people with this name
- Barbara Mervin (born 1982), Canadian rugby union player
- Edmund Mervin, Anglican Archdeacon of Surrey from 1556 to 1559

== Places ==
- Rural Municipality of Mervin No. 499, Saskatchewan, Canada
  - Mervin, Saskatchewan, a village

== Businesses ==
- Mervin Manufacturing, an American snowboard manufacturer

== See also ==
- Mervyn, a related name
- Merwin (disambiguation)
