= Merwin (name) =

- Gender: male

Origin
- Origin: Welsh

Other names
- Related names: Mervin, Mervyn, Marvin

Merwin or Merwyn is a surname and masculine given name.

== Surname ==
- Abigail Merwin (1759–1786), who warned her hometown of the arrival of British forces in the American Revolutionary War
- Bannister Merwin (1873–1922), early American film director
- David Merwin (1936-1960), American Olympic canoeist
- Herbert E. Merwin (1878-1963), American mineralogist and petrologist
- Jesse Merwin (1783–1852), American schoolmaster, possible inspiration for the character Ichabod Crane in the short story "The Legend of Sleepy Hollow"
- John David Merwin (1921–2013), former Governor of the United States Virgin Islands
- Margaret Merwin Patch (née Margaret Stone Merwin; 1894–1987) American arts administrator, and statistician
- Orange Merwin (1777–1853), member of the U.S. House of Representatives from Connecticut
- Sam Merwin, Jr. (1910–1996), mystery and science fiction writer, and editor
- Samuel Merwin (writer) (1874–1936), American playwright and author
- Samuel Edwin Merwin (1831–1907), American politician, Lieutenant Governor of Connecticut
- Susan B. Merwin (1874-1923), American educator, publisher, and superintendent of the Kentucky School for the Blind
- Timothy Taylor Merwin (1807-1885), American lawyer, state representative, and businessman
- W. S. Merwin (1927–2019), American poet

== Given name ==
- Merwin Coad (1924–2025), American minister and politician from Iowa
- Merwin Graham (1903–1989), American Olympic athlete
- Merwin K. Hart (1881–1962), American politician
- Merwin Hodel (1931–1988), American football player
- Merwin Jacobson (1894–1978), Major League Baseball backup outfielder
- Merwin Maier (1908–1942), American attorney
- Merwin Mitterwallner (1897–1974), American football player
- Merwin Mondesir (born 1976), Canadian actor
- Merwin Sibulkin (1926–2006), American scientist
- Merwin H. Silverthorn (1896–1985), lieutenant general and Assistant Commandant of the United States Marine Corps
- Merwin Crawford Young (1931–2020), American political scientist

== See also ==
- Merwin (disambiguation)
