= Oogarding =

Heritage-listed villa in Brisbane, Queensland, Australia

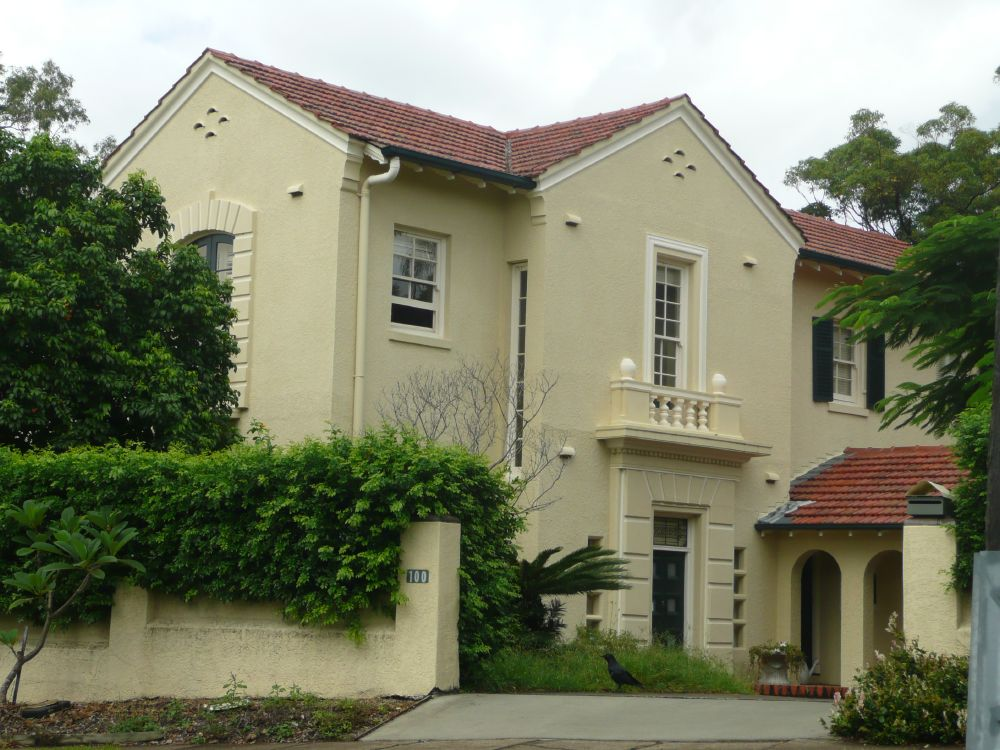
- Oogarding, 2009

- Location within Queensland Location within Australia
- 27.4618°S 152.9821°E
- Location: 100 Simpsons Road, Bardon, City of Brisbane, Queensland, Australia

History
- Design period: 1939–1945 (World War II)
- Built: 1940–1965
- Built for: James Gervase (Gerb) Joyce and Mrs Edith Joyce

Site notes
- Architect: Mervyn Rylance
- Architectural style: Mediterranean Revival style

Queensland Heritage Register
- Official name: Oogarding
- Type: state heritage (built)
- Designated: 23 June 2000
- Reference no.: 602074
- Significant period: 1940s, 1960s (fabric); 1940s (historical)
- Significant components: other – residential: component, garage, residential accommodation – main house, furniture/fittings, basement / sub-floor, extension/s or addition/s, loggia/s, lead light/s, terracing
- Builders: Jan Cupka

Oogarding is a heritage-listed villa at 100 Simpsons Road, Bardon, City of Brisbane, Queensland, Australia. It was designed by architect Mervyn Rylance and built in 1940 by Jan Cupka. It was extended in 1964 and 1965. It was added to the Queensland Heritage Register on 23 June 2000.

== History ==
Oogarding, a two storey, rendered masonry house in the Mediterranean Revival style was built in 1940–41 to the design of architect Mervyn Rylance. The house is prominently located on a sharp bend in Simpsons Road in the Brisbane suburb of Bardon and is set on a large block of land, against a stand of tall gum trees.

In 1940, Rylance was commissioned by Mr James Gervase (Gerb) Joyce and Mrs Edith Joyce to design a house for them on a one-acre allotment which had been subdivided from the Joyce family property in Bardon. Gerb Joyce was a well known Brisbane business identity and owner of the Helidon Spa soft drink company. The Joyces named their new house Oogarding, the Aboriginal name for the spa to which they owed their fortune. It appears that the Joyces commissioned Rylance on the recommendation of the builder Mr Jan Cupka. Cupka had constructed at least three other buildings designed by Rylance around this time.

Rylance opened his architectural practice in Brisbane in 1933 and domestic commissions formed the basis of his practice. In the period up until World War II, he designed a number of relatively expensive and substantial homes in both the English and Mediterranean styles. The Mediterranean style established itself strongly in the temperate parts of Australia in the interwar period. This was largely due to the efforts of its central proponent, Professor Leslie Wilkinson and through his position as the first chair of architecture at an Australian university. Wilkinson was able to influence many architects with his ideas about the suitability of Mediterranean styled architecture for the Australian climate. In effect, the style was a regionalisation of Georgian domestic architecture and avoided blatant Mediterranean features such as those adopted in Spanish Mission architecture, preferring classical details, smooth render, soft tones and round arches that simply evoked a Mediterranean feeling.

Mervyn Rylance was one of these young architects influenced by Wilkinson's ideas. Although he was born in Brisbane, Rylance was educated in Sydney and England and was an articled pupil with Joseland and Gilling Architects in Sydney. F Glynn Gilling was recognised as a leading practitioner of the Mediterranean Style and his Woolcock Forbes house was to have a lasting influence on Rylance. Very few pure Mediterranean Style houses were built in Brisbane and Rylance was responsible for the design of a number of key examples including the Blanchard House at 43 Maxwell Street, New Farm, the Bartlett House at 390 Swann Road, St. Lucia and Oogarding.

The house was constructed by Mr Jan Cupka and it appears to have been built on the basis of a negotiated contract as no tender was advertised. When interviewed in 1995, Mrs Joyce remembered Rylance as "a dedicated professional", attending the site every couple of days during the nine month construction period. He personally applied the faux stone finish to the fireplace, throwing sand at the wet render and ruling in the joints with his pencil.

In 1964, a new family room was added to the south-east corner of the house, to the specification of Terrence Reid. Later in 1965, Hayes, Scott and Henderson Architects designed a new garage, front terrace and other landscape works and re-modelled the kitchen. The Joyce family lived in the house from its construction until 1999 when the house was bought by the Gasteen family.

== Description ==
Oogarding is a substantial two story residence with basement designed in the Mediterranean Style. It is constructed of load-bearing masonry that has been smooth rendered, recently re-rendered and painted in a creamy tone. The medium-pitched roof is clad in glazed terracotta Marseilles pattern tiles and has exposed rafter ends that are decoratively shaped on the front elevation and agricultural pipe vents set in a diamond pattern in the gable ends. The entrance door is a significant feature and is strongly expressed with raised rendered decoration to resemble substantial masonry surrounding the panelled door. The door, designed by Rylance, has eight square panels which are repeated in the form of a vertical strip of four square windows on either side of the door. The door is surmounted by a leadlight fanlight with the name of the house incorporated into the design.

In plan, the house has an offset cruciform shape with the entry positioned at the core of the house on the Western side. A sunken passageway leads from the front door to a hall that leads, through large openings, to the dining room, lounge room and terrace as well as to the stairs to the upper floor. Each of these major public rooms occupy an arm of the cross in plan and the lounge in particular is generously proportioned. The dining room and lounge room are linked by timber and glass sliding doors with arched heads. An ornate fireplace with a faux stone finish and moulded decoration is a prominent feature of the lounge room, as are the decorative plaster ceilings of both public rooms. The terrace is a semi-enclosed room with a short arcade of three arched openings on the northern wall and single arches on the eastern and western walls. The suspended timber floors are red stringybark and covering tiles have recently been removed from several areas. All joinery and mouldings in the house are silky oak, apart from the handrail which is maple.

The house was originally designed to cater for a family served by a maid and a secondary circulation route links the main public rooms with the kitchen and laundry areas. A bathroom is located between these utility areas and public areas and has a small antechamber adjacent to it. Renovations in the 1960s relocated the kitchen further to the south-east edge of the house, in the position formerly occupied by the maid's room. A round-arched loggia links the utility areas to the garage which provides accommodation for three cars.

The second story accommodates four bedrooms, a bathroom and a sleepout. The expansive main bedroom is located directly above the lounge room in the north-east corner and has several built-in cupboards. The highly detailed bathroom has an alcove bath, a built-in shower recess, a decorative sandblasted mirror designed by the architect and a strong single colour scheme of carefully detailed blue tiles.

On the exterior, the main bedroom projects slightly and is supported by corbels. On the northern wall, multi-paned French doors open out to a small semi-circular "Juliet" balcony. These doors are surrounded with raised rendered decoration similar to that around the front entry door. Windows throughout the house are generally multi-paned timber sash and casement windows and most have external timber louvre shutters.

N.B This description was prepared on the basis of documentary evidence only, the place was not inspected.

== Heritage listing ==
Oogarding was listed on the Queensland Heritage Register on 23 June 2000 having satisfied the following criteria.

The place is important in demonstrating the evolution or pattern of Queensland's history.

Oogarding demonstrates the principal characteristic of a substantial, interwar Mediterranean Style residence with important style indicators such as asymmetrical massing, cement rendered masonry construction and Marseilles tiled roof, strongly expressed main entry door, round arched and arcaded loggia, "Juliet" balcony and multi-paned, double hung windows with louvred timber shutters.

Oogarding is important because of its aesthetic significance, due to its fine and restrained design, careful detailing, high quality and distinctive interior fittings and garden setting. The house has significance as a surviving intact example of the work of important interwar Queensland architect, Mervyn Rylance and is considered among the best examples of his work and a key example of Mediterranean Style architecture in Queensland.

The place is important in demonstrating the principal characteristics of a particular class of cultural places.

Oogarding demonstrates the principal characteristic of a substantial, interwar Mediterranean Style residence with important style indicators such as asymmetrical massing, cement rendered masonry construction and Marseilles tiled roof, strongly expressed main entry door, round arched and arcaded loggia, "Juliet" balcony and multi-paned, double hung windows with louvred timber shutters.

The place is important because of its aesthetic significance.

Oogarding is important because of its aesthetic significance, due to its fine and restrained design, careful detailing, high quality and distinctive interior fittings and garden setting.

The place has a special association with the life or work of a particular person, group or organisation of importance in Queensland's history.

The house has significance as a surviving intact example of the work of important interwar Queensland architect, Mervyn Rylance and is considered among the best examples of his work and a key example of Mediterranean Style architecture in Queensland.
