= Rylance =

Rylance is an English surname. Notable people with the surname include:

- Georgina Rylance, English actress
- Heath Rylance, American football player
- Juliet Rylance, English actress
- Mark Rylance, English actor
- Merv Rylance, Australian rugby player
- Ronald Rylance, English rugby player
