= Haevn =

Dutch pop band

HAEVN
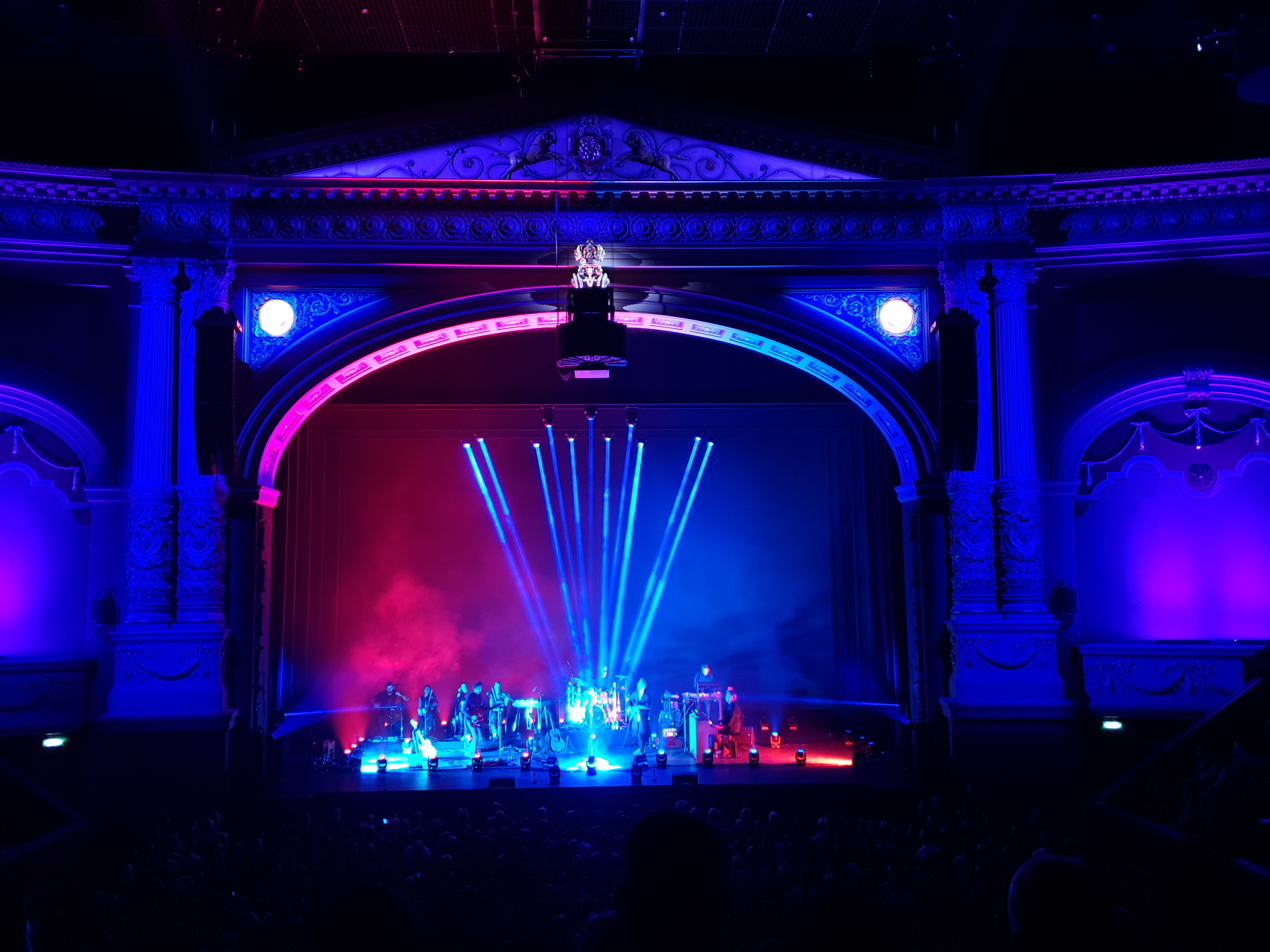
- HAEVN performing in 2018

Background information
- Origin: Amsterdam, Netherlands
- Genres: Indie; ambient
- Years active: 2015–present
- Members: Marijn van der Meer; Jorrit Kleijnen; David Broeders; Mart Jeninga; Bram Doreleijers
- Past members: Tom Veugen
- Website: haevnmusic.com

Haevn (stylized as HAEVN) is a Dutch indie pop band from Amsterdam, founded in 2015 by singer-songwriter Marijn van der Meer and film soundtrack composer Jorrit Kleijnen, who began writing music together in their studio in Amsterdam. The band also includes guitarist Bram Doreleijers (Ape Not Mice, Celine Cairo), bass player Mart Jeninga (Celine Cairo), and drummer David Broeders.

== History ==
=== Beginnings ===
HAEVN was formed when film soundtrack composer Jorrit Kleijnen and singer-songwriter Marijn van der Meer met while working on a film score. This collaboration resulted in the songs "Where the Heart Is" and "Finding Out More", which appeared in a BMW commercial. The songs reached the international charts through Shazam, after which the duo decided to work out full songs with Tim Bran of Dreadzone, who has also produced music for the British band London Grammar and the artist Birdy.

The addition of guitarist Tom Veugen and drummer David Broeders rounded out the band, and on 17 September 2015, they held their first performance at the Dutch travelling music festival Popronde. In October 2015, the radio station NPO 3FM proclaimed the band a "Serious Talent". Following this, the band's concert at the Paradiso (Amsterdam) on 21 May 2016 sold out in 4 days. They were nominated for an Edison Award in 2016 and a 3FM Award for Best Newcomer. Both "Finding Out More" and "Bright Lights" ended up in the top 20 of the Song of the Year chart and at the end of December 2016, "Finding Out More" entered the Top 2000, placing at number 1,321. The song made the list again in 2017.

HAEVN have played at major Dutch festivals such as Eurosonic Noorderslag, Paaspop (Schijndel), Dauwpop, Retropop, Indian Summer Festival, Concert At Sea, Huntenpop, Appelpop, and Royal Park Live at Soestdijk Palace.

On 2 April 2017, the band sold out the Carré Theatre in Amsterdam with a new band member, bassist Mart Jeninga, together with the Red Limo String Quartet. At the end of 2017, the new track "Fortitude" was released and it could be heard in the television series Riverdale.

=== Eyes Closed ===
HAEVN was signed by Warner Music Group in 2018, and they launched that year with two shows at Eurosonic Noorderslag with new guitarist Bram Doreleijers. On 23 February 2018, during their sold-out performance in the Grote Zaal of the Paradiso, a Gold Record for "Finding Out More" was presented to them by Dutch radio DJ Giel Beelen. In May of that year, the single "Back in the Water" was released and followed by the Eyes Closed tour in April, which saw the band playing in the nation's six major music halls.

Due to the band's overseas success, their debut album Eyes Closed was released internationally on 25 May 2018 and entered at number 1 on the iTunes chart. This was followed by international shows in Paris and Göttingen, and the group played two days in a sold-out Carré Theatre in October 2018.

=== Symphonic Tales ===
In 2019, the band announced the release of the live album Symphonic Tales on their website. The album consists of six songs recorded with a 50-piece orchestra. Four of the tracks are taken from the debut album Eyes Closed and two are original compositions. It was released in late April 2019.

=== Unfold Tour, Wide Awake ===
HAEVN conducted a tour of the Netherlands in May and June 2020, during which they revealed new material from their upcoming album. A German/Swiss tour is set to follow starting in September 2020.

In 2024, the band released their second studio album, titled Wide Awake.

== Band members ==
Current

- Marijn van der Meer – vocals, guitar
- Jorrit Kleijnen – keyboards
- Bram Doreleijers – guitar
- Mart Jeninga – bass guitar
- David Broeders – drums

Past

- Tom Veugen – guitar

== Discography ==
=== Albums ===
| Title | Details | Peak chart positions | | |
| Title | Details | NL | BEL (Fl) | BEL (Wa) |
|---|---|---|---|---|
| Eyes Closed | Released: 25 May 2018; Label: Warner Music; Formats: Digital download, CD | 2 | 30 | 141 |
| Wide Awake | Released: 11 October 2024; Label: Nettwerk Music; Formats: Digital download, CD | 14 | — | — |

=== EPs ===
- Back in the Water (The Remix EP) (2018)
- Symphonic Tales (2019)
- Holy Ground (2022)

=== Singles ===
| Year | Title | Peak chart positions | | Album |
| Year | Title | NL Top 40 | NL Single Top 100 | Album |
|---|---|---|---|---|
| 2015 | "Where the Heart Is" | – | – | Eyes Closed |
| 2015 | "Finding Out More" | 25 | 77 | Eyes Closed |
| 2016 | "Bright Lights" | 1* (Tip) | 30* (Tip) | Eyes Closed |
| 2017 | "Bright Lights" (Sam Feldt Remix) | – | 29* (Tip) | Non-album single |
| 2017 | "Fortitude" | 11* (Tip) | 3* (Tip) | Eyes Closed |
| 2018 | "Back in the Water" | 10* (Tip) | 10* (Tip) | Eyes Closed |
| 2018 | "Mind Games" | 8* (Tip) | 16* (Tip) | Eyes Closed |
| 2020 | "No Man's Land (Symphonic Version)" | – | – | Symphonic Tales |
| 2021 | "Throw Me a Line" | – | – | Holy Ground |
| 2021 | "Open Hearts" | – | – | Non-album single |
| 2022 | "Holy Ground" | – | – | Holy Ground |
| 2022 | "Trade It for the Night" | – | – | Holy Ground |
| 2023 | "Where Did You Go" | – | – | Non-album single |
| 2024 | "Promise" | – | – | Wide Awake |
| 2024 | "One Day" | – | – | Wide Awake |
| 2024 | "Beginners" | – | – | Wide Awake |
| 2024 | "Great Mother" (featuring Neco Novellas) | – | – | Wide Awake |
| 2025 | "Caught a Light (Mantra)" with Neco Novellas | – | – | Non-album single |

*Did not appear in the official Dutch main Top 40 and Single Top 100 charts, but rather in the bubbling under Tipparade charts.
