= Carmen Haid =

Austrian fashion industry entrepreneur

Carmen Haid (born 1974) is an Austrian fashion industry and lifestyle entrepreneur and the founder of Atelier-Mayer.com.

== Education ==
Haid received her education at London College of Fashion (BA HONS Fashion Management).

== Career ==
In 1997 - 2008 Carmen was employed as an in-house communications executive at Yves Saint Laurent Céline and Tommy Hilfiger with a stint at British Vogue in 2001.

In 2008 she launched Atelier-Mayer.com, a website for vintage luxury fashion and accessories, in collaboration with designers Rafael Lopez, Jaques Fath and by Walid. The company closed its doors in 2015.

In 2009 she was nominated for the Entrepreneur of the Year, Grazia 02 Awards, for Best Design, Veranda Awards USA, and for Best Vintage Website for the first online Fashion Awards, Handbag.com.

In 2010 she was named as Best Emerging Brand and Retailer for the WGSN Global Fashion Awards.

In 2011 she won the Future 100 Awards, as well as the Wallpaper Design Award for Best Hotel Service.

In 2011 Haid launched a bi-annual limited edition print publication as well as a supplement to Vanity Fair that was stocked in Dover Street Market London, Colette Paris and Ginette Beirut.

In 2022 Haid re-launched Atelier Mayer in a new format, with an online platform focussing on vintage objects, furniture and lifestyle, offering interior services and a by appointment only showroom in Marrakech.

== Books ==
- The Fashion Handbook by Tim Jackson & David Shaw, 2006
- Jackson, Tim and Haid, Carmen (2002) Gucci Group: The New family of Luxury Brands, A Case Study. International Journal of New Product Development and Innovation Management, 4 (2). pp. 161–172. ISSN 1540-5885
- Contemporary Fashion Stylists by Luanne Mclean, Sep 2012
- ’Irma’s World - Stilvoll in allen Lebenslagen’ by Jasmin Kherzi, Callwey, 2023
- ’Narrative Thread - Conversations on Fashion Collections’ by Mark O’Flaherty, Bloomsbury, 2023
