= Mervin (given name) =

- Gender: Male

Origin
- Origin: Welsh

Other names
- Related names: Marvin, Mervyn, Merwin

Mervin is a masculine given name of Welsh origin which means "great lord".

People with the name include:

- Mervin Field (1921–2015), American pollster
- Mervin D. Garretson (1923–2013), American educator
- Mervin Heller Jr. (1947–2012), American tennis player
- Mervin Jackson (1946–2012), American basketball player
- Mervin Kaye (1929–2024), Canadian rower
- Mervin Kelly (1894–1971), American physicist
- Mervin King (1914–2008), American police officer
- Mervin Matthew (born 1985), West Indian cricketer
- Mervin E. Muller (1928–2018), American computer scientist
- Mervin C. Salazar (born 1977), Filipino writer
- Mervin C. Stanley (1857–1907), American businessman
- Mervin Vavasour (1821–1866), British engineer
- Mervin F. Verbit (born 1936), American sociologist
- Mervin M. Alvarado (born 2008), Him
- Mervin M Dayan (born 2005), American Businessman & Scholar
