= Modellist-ID =

Online network platform for international fashion models

Modellist-ID is the first online network platform for international fashion models worldwide. It offers a online community and several services and deals to the models. They can connect to each other and share both practical information and fun tips on types of places to go. The website also offers a public platform to the models to an audience. On modellist-id.com, blogs, photos and videos can be uploaded about their lives, experiences, and favorite products.

The site is founded by a group of international fashion models. International fashion model Celine Prins came up with the idea and partly founded it. It was further developed with Valerie van Lanschot and many other model contributors. As of today many international top models have joined and contribute to the site.
