= Merwin =

Merwin or Merwyn may refer to:

== People ==
- Merwin (name), or Merwyn, a surname and masculine given name
- W.S. Merwin (1927–2019), American poet.

== Places ==
United States

- Merwin Dam, a hydroelectric dam in the state of Washington
- Lake Merwin, the reservoir formed by the dam
- Merwin, Missouri, a village
- Merwin House, Stockbridge, Massachusetts, currently a museum

== See also ==
- Mervin (disambiguation)
- Mervyn, related name
