= Mervin C. Salazar =

Filipino writer (born 1977)

Mervin C. Salazar (born 1977) is a Filipino writer. In 1996, Salazar was awarded the Don Carlos Palanca Memorial Awards for Literature, the Philippines' most prestigious literary award. He finished a Bachelor of Arts degree in creative writing at University of the Philippines.
