= 4 and 6 Wiston Gardens, Double Bay =

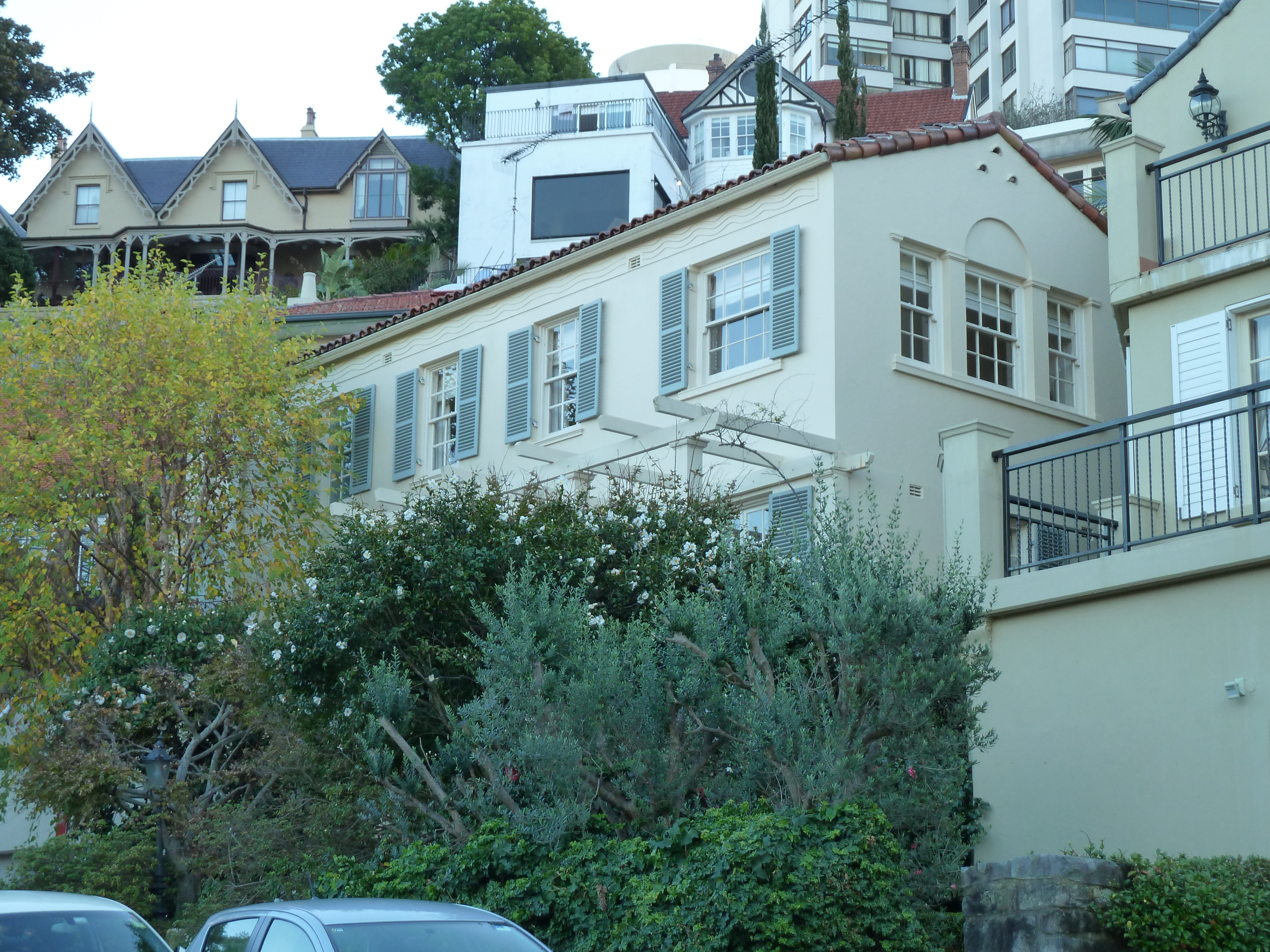
- 6 Wiston Gardens in 2012

- Location within Sydney Location within Australia
- 33°52′22″S 151°14′24″E
- Location: 4 and 6 Wiston Gardens, Double Bay, New South Wales, Australia

History
- Built: 1932–1936

Site notes
- Architect: Professor Leslie Wilkinson

New South Wales Heritage Register
- Official name: Houses; Wiston Gardens; Sweetapple (#4); Parkinson (#6)
- Type: State heritage (complex / group)
- Designated: 2 April 1999
- Reference no.: 209
- Type: House
- Category: Residential buildings (private)

The houses located at 4 and 6 Wiston Gardens, Double Bay are heritage-listed former residences and estate with vineyard and now residences located at 4 and 6 Wiston Gardens, Double Bay, New South Wales, Australia. It was designed by Professor Leslie Wilkinson and built from 1932 to 1936. It is also known as Wiston Gardens; Sweetapple (#4); Parkinson (#6).

== History ==
Originally known by its Aboriginal name Yarranabbee, this suburb on the south side of Sydney harbour was called Mrs Darling's Point in honour of his wife by Ralph Darling, the NSW Colonial Governor of 1825–31. At that time the area was heavily timbered, but after New South Head Road was built in 1831 timber cutters felled many of the trees, and the land was subdivided. Most of the plots, covering 3.6 to 6.1 hectares (9 to 15 acres) in this area, were taken up between 1833 and 1838. The "Mrs" was lost from the name and the suburb and point became Darling Point.

Wiston Gardens is located in the area of Double Bay which originally formed part of the "Mount Adelaide" estate established by William Macdonald in the 1830s. Although Macdonald did not build a house on the site he was responsible for a considerable amount of landscaping including the planting of a vineyard on the site of what is now Wiston Gardens, including No. 4 Wiston Gardens. The vineyard was reputedly designed by Thomas Shepherd, the first nurseryman and landscape designer in the colony. The Mount Adelaide Estate was extensively sub-divided between the time Macdonald departed for England in 1837 and the turn of the century.

In 1833 "Villa allotments" were advertised for sale at 'Mrs Darling's Point'. The land was auctioned on 11 October and the largest allotment No. 10, 13 acres 3 rods won the eastern side of the point was purchased by William Macdonald, an emancipist (transported for life for forgery) turned successful businessman and entrepreneur, dealing in general hardware. Macdonald named his purchase Mount Adelaide and spent considerable amounts of money on it, although no residence had been built by the time he put it up for sale in 1837.

=== Thomas Shepherd, landscape gardener ===
In the 1830s (1833–37) Macdonald was responsible for a considerable amount of landscaping including the planting of a vineyard on the Mount Adelaide estate (part of which is the site of what is now Wiston Gardens, including No.s 4 & 6). The vineyard was reputedly designed by Thomas Shepherd, the first nurseryman and landscape designer in the colony. The Mount Adelaide Estate was extensively sub-divided between the time Macdonald departed for England in 1837 and the turn of the century.

Thomas Shepherd (c. 1779–1835) landscape gardener and nursery proprietor was NSW's first nurseryman, the first early writer and teacher on landscape design in the colony and one of the main proponents of vine cultivation in this period. His father was Principal Gardener to the Earl of Crawford and Lindesay at his property Struthers, where the young Thomas received his earliest horticultural education. He then trained in all aspects of landscape gardening and worked for the practice of Thomas White before setting himself up as a practising landscape gardener in both Scotland and England. In his English work he came in contact with Humphry Repton (noted landscape gardener) and in his writing criticised some of Repton's methods. Shepherd eventually established a nursery at Hackney (London) to support his business. Widowed (c. 1821-2) and then remarried (1823) and faced with an unprofitable landscape and nursery business in the period after 1815 at the end of the Napoleonic Wars, he took a position with the New Zealand Company. As Principal Superintendent he was charged with establishment of a colony on Stewart Island, New Zealand, with the intention of cultivating flax (Phormium tenax).

With a band of colonists, mainly Scots, he sailed in 1825 with his new wife Jane Sarah (née Henderson) and young family for the South Pacific. Unsuccessful in finding a suitable place for a settlement either in Stewart Island or the rest of New Zealand, they arrived in Sydney in early 1827. With encouragement from Governor Darling, he established the first commercial nursery garden in Australia near Grose Farm (1827) (today's suburb of Chippendale/Darlington, and adjacent to what is now the University of Sydney and Victoria Park). He named his nursery the Darling Nursery in honour of his patron. Progress was difficult because of the unprepared nature of the land allocated and he began with a vegetable garden. This was gradually expanded into the Darling Nursery with help of stock from Sydney Botanic Gardens, as well as from Colonial Secretary Alexander Macleay at Elizabeth Bay House and his son William Macarthur at Camden Park. Little is known of his landscaping work but, having established himself in the colony, Shepherd gave two sets of lectures at Sydney Mechanics' School of Arts during 1834–5, for which (in their published form) he is now chiefly remembered.

Shepherd's first published writings were on viticulture (1831) and he was an early supporter of James Busby (viticultural promoter, educator, and patron). Shepherd's "Lectures on the Horticulture of New South Wales" (1835) addressed practical matters, such as the growing of vegetables in a colony with a different climate and soils to those of Britain and complete turnabout of the seasons. The vital need for water in hot Sydney summers was also stressed in this, Australia's first garden book. 'Lectures on Landscape Gardening in Australia (1836) of which only the first was able to be delivered due to Shepherd's death, was the first Australian book to address garden design, and preceded by five years the first major North American text on landscape gardening (by Andrew Jackson Downing). At first sight conservative in their aesthetics, the lectures drew rhetorically on the (Capability) Brownian tradition of the English landscape garden, albeit tempered by local circumstance and contemporary thought. Shepherd deplored the indiscriminate destruction of timber and instead advocated selective thinning and tasteful arrangement and disposition of exotic trees to create "pleasing effects (and) ...improved scenery". He addressed a range of garden styles – Sublime, Picturesque, and Beautiful – an inclusive approach in a colony of only modest population. His advice on education for young gardeners had strong overtones of (publisher and writer) John Claudius Loudon, and many of the later lectures borrowed from his writings.

William McDonald's Mount Adelaide estate (1833–37) is the only known landscape design that can confidently be attributed to Thomas Shepherd – a terraced vineyard overlooking an ornamental fishpond with Sydney Harbour (Double Bay) as a backdrop.

The site has identified archaeological potential for relics associated with the significant 1830s vineyard prior to its subdivision and construction of both Lewis' 1838+ house and subsequent additions, its demolition and construction of Babworth House between 1912 and 1915. The estate (and its subdivisions, such as 4 & 6 Wiston Gardens to the east and downhill) are significant for their association with Shepherd and through hims with contemporary theories of aesthetics in landscaping and picturesque design and to demonstrate aspects of the cultivation of the vine and the design, layout and construction of a vineyard of the 1830s. The potential for substantial remains is limited as a result of the major changes to the site of the vineyard (through subdivision and housing construction). Building and garden making by Lewis and later Hordern family may have removed much of the potential archaeological remains of Mount Adelaide's landscaping (e.g. vineyard terraces and fishpond) from the 1830s.

No. 6 Wiston Gardens was completed by 1934, and won the Sir John Sulman Medal for architecture in that year. The house which is the subject of this proposal (No.4) was built in 1935 or 1936, and was originally built to complement No 6 Wiston Gardens also designed by Leslie Wilkinson, the first professor of architecture at the University of Sydney. However the garden of No 6 has been sub-divided and a new house has been built on this land.

=== Grounds ===
The site has identified archaeological potential for relics associated with the significant 1830s vineyard of the Mount Adelaide Estate located on this site prior to its subdivision and construction of the subject house. These potential relics have been assessed as significant for the following reasons:

- For their association with Thomas Shepherd, the first nurseryman, the first early writer and teacher on landscape design in NSW, first nurseryman and one of the main proponents of vine cultivation in this period.
- For their association with William Macdonald, an ex-convict who became a wealthy entrepreneur.
- For their association with contemporary theories of aesthetics in landscaping and picturesque design.
- For their ability to demonstrate aspects of the cultivation of the vine and the design, layout and construction of a vineyard of the 1830s.

The potential for substantive is remains is limited as a result of the major changes to the site of the vineyard (through subdivision and housing construction).

The site appears to have some remains of the general landforms of the former vineyard from the 1830s.

The existing garden terraces and their stone retaining walls are significant landscape features of the setting of the heritage item, as part of the 1936 Wilkinson design and reflecting the earlier vineyard terraces.

The front garden – All existing plantings and garden layout in the affected part of the site was established approximately 15 years ago by the present owner in order to recreate the original Wilkinson garden layout. Prior to this there was only undeveloped lawn in the affected part of the site.

== Description ==
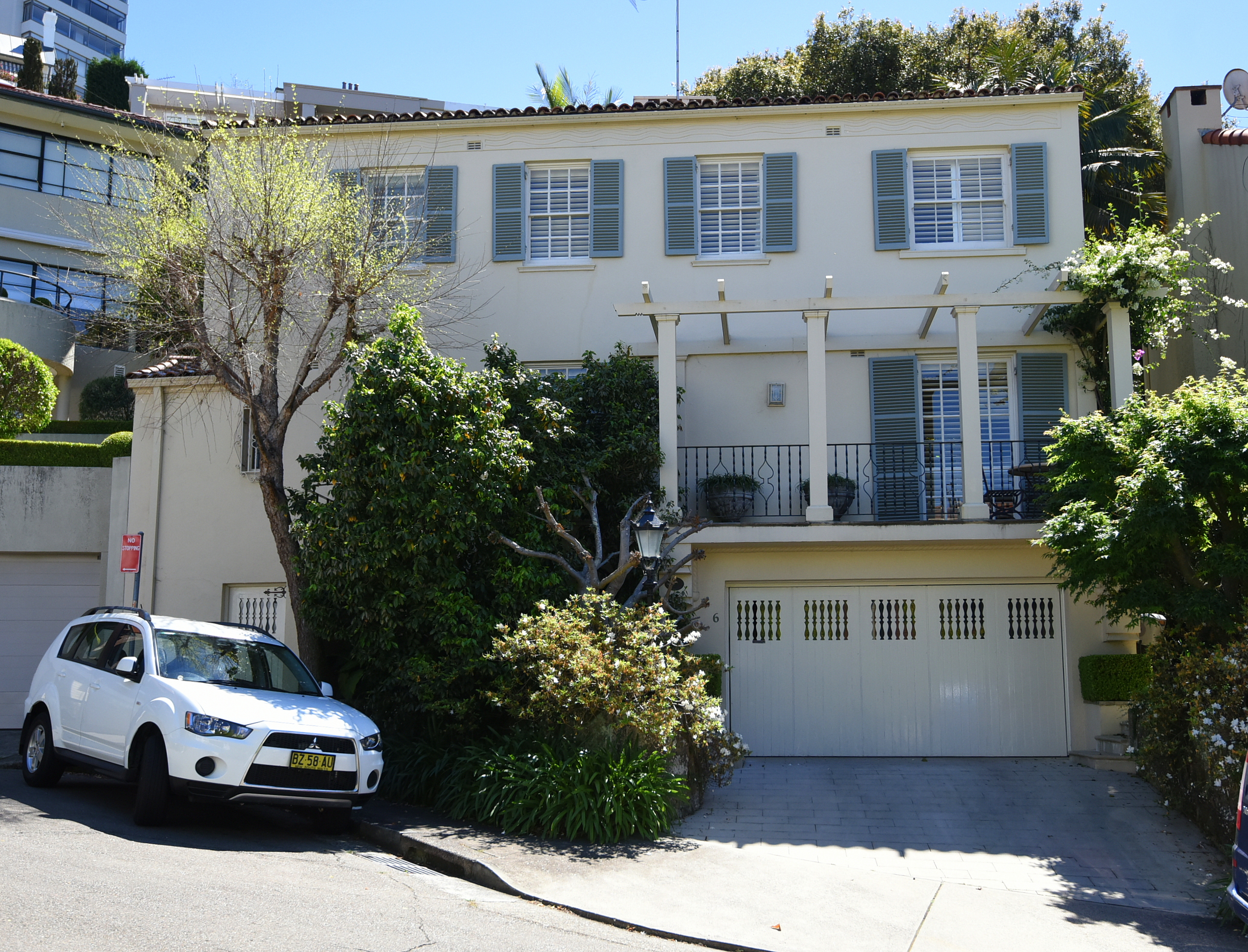
4 Wiston Gardens in 2017

=== Site ===
The site is very steep with a sandstone cliff to the rear of the property. There is a small courtyard behind the house and a larger garden yard on the terrace above the cliff. A lush semi-tropical garden runs parallel to the north side of the house. The site appears to have some remains of the general landforms of the former vineyard from the 1830s. The existing garden terraces and their stone retaining walls are significant landscape features of the setting of the heritage item, as part of the 1932 Wilkinson design and reflecting the earlier vineyard terraces. The garden has evolved in a manner which has continued Wilkinson's original scheme.

The front garden – all existing plantings and garden layout in the affected part of the site was established approximately 15 years ago by the present owner in order to recreate the original Wilkinson garden layout. Prior to this ...there was only undeveloped lawn in the affected part of the site

=== House ===
The house is a two-storey building in the Inter-war Spanish Mediterranean style with Georgian features. The site is very steep with a sandstone cliff to the rear of the property. There is a small courtyard behind the house and a larger garden yard on the terrace above the cliff. A lush semi-tropical garden runs parallel to the north side of the house. The garden has evolved in a manner which has continued Wilkinson's original scheme.

=== Condition ===
As at 10 January 2008, the identified potential is for relics associated with the 1830s vineyard, which had been located on this site prior to its subdivision and construction of the subject house. These potential relics have been assessed as significant for the following reasons:

- For their association with Thomas Shepherd, the first nurseryman, the first early writer on landscape design in NSW, and one of the main proponents of vine cultivation in this period.
- For their association with William Macdonald, an ex-convict who became a wealthy entrepreneur.
- For their association with contemporary theories of aesthetics in landscaping and picturesque design.
- For their ability to demonstrate aspects of the cultivation of the vine and the design, layout and construction of a vineyard of the 1830s.

There is limited potential for substantive remains as a result of major changes to the site of the vineyard (through subdivision and housing construction). The potential relics identified in the submitted Archaeological Assessment appear to include buried dry stone walls that retained the 1830s vineyard terraces, demonstrating the original layout, design and construction of this vineyard, and evidence of the early vine species in the buried topsoil.

The Statement of Heritage Impact submits that all existing plantings and garden layout in the affected part of the site was established approximately 15 years ago by the present owner in order to recreate the original Wilkinson garden layout. Prior to this time, it is submitted that there was only undeveloped lawn in the affected part of the site.

While these recent landscaping works may have disguised potential relics of the 1830s vineyard, they are unlikely to have significantly disturbed these identified potential relics in the area of the proposed excavation.

=== Modifications and dates ===
The garden has evolved in a manner which has continued Wilkinson's original scheme:

- 1987/88: internal and external alterations including the construction of a new library within the cliff face at the rear of the building. A swimming pool was also approved on one of the terraces that the cliff is formed into.
- 2003: alterations to the front fence, existing garage and proposed additional double garage and cellar as follows:
  - Convert garage to a playroom, reinstating the existing garage door materials and design (replacing the recent plywood replica).
  - Create two windows openings in the northern elevation of the existing garage, to match existing adjacent windows.
  - Infill existing opening in the stone front fence of the existing vehicular crossing, to match existing stone fence.
  - Reinstate the Wilkinson gate archway of the front fence.
  - Excavate front garden for construction of double garage and cellar under the garden.
  - Garage will retain over its roof sufficient top soil to retain existing garden layout.
  - Transplant or match existing garden plantings.
  - Create opening in existing stone fence for proposed garage door.
  - Stonework of front fence will be carefully removed during the excavation process and relaid with the same type of bedding, mortar joints, pattern and aged finish.
  - Garage door will be constructed of solid timber vertical slats with routed slots for ventilation.

== Heritage listing ==
As at 14 May 2009, the house is of state significance as part of a group of houses that are representative of the distinct style of architecture by the prominent Sydney architect, Professor Leslie Wilkinson. It has maintained a sound domestic design integrity and is a relatively intact example of Wilkinson's domestic architecture and garden design.

The site is of significance as part of the extensive 1830s Mount Adelaide Estate and as the location of the vineyard of that estate, designed by Thomas Shepherd, the colony's first nurseryman and landscape designer.

Houses was listed on the New South Wales State Heritage Register on 2 April 1999.
