= Céline Louche =

Economist academic based in New Zealand

Academic background
- Education: Erasmus University Rotterdam, Aix-Marseille University
- Thesis: Ethical investment : processes and mechanisms of institutionalisation in the Netherlands, 1990–2002 (2004)
- Academic advisor: Wim Hafkamp

Céline Louche is a New Zealand academic, and is a full professor at the University of Waikato, specialising in interactions between business and society, covering topics such as corporate responsibility, sustainable development, and responsible finance.

== Academic career ==
Louche completed a PhD titled Ethical investment: processes and mechanisms of institutionalisation in the Netherlands, 1990–2002 at the Erasmus University Rotterdam. Louche worked at Triodos Bank in The Netherlands, as a sustainability advisor, before entering academia. Louche was assistant professor of corporate responsibility at the Vlerick Business School in Belgium, and associate professor at the Audencia Nantes School of Management in France.

Louche joined the faculty of the School of Management and Marketing Operations at University of Waikato, rising to full professor. Louche researches topics like corporate responsibility, sustainable development, and responsible finance. Louche co-authored a book on dilemmas in responsible financing, which was published by Routledge in 2011 and reissued as an ebook in 2017.

Louche is on the editorial boards of a number of journals, including Business & Society, Sustainability Accounting, Management and Policy Journal, M@n@gement and Journal of Sustainable Finance & Investment, Organization & Environment. Louche was the jury chairwoman for the Forum pour l'Investissement Responsible (Sustainable Investment Forum) PIR Awards in 2023. Louche has had visiting fellowships at Stanford University and University of California Berkeley.

== Selected works ==
- Nigel Roome; Louche, Céline (2015). "Journeying Toward Business Models for Sustainability". Organization & Environment. 29 (1): 11–35. doi:10.1177/1086026615595084. Wikidata Q60723728.
- Louche, Céline; Arenas, Daniel; Katinka C. van Cranenburgh (2012). "From Preaching to Investing: Attitudes of Religious Organisations Towards Responsible Investment". Journal of Business Ethics. 110 (3): 301–320. doi:10.1007/s10551-011-1155-8. Wikidata Q60723745.
- Louche, Céline; Timo Busch; Crifo, Patricia; Marcus, Alfred (2019). "Financial Markets and the Transition to a Low-Carbon Economy: Challenging the Dominant Logics". Organization & Environment. 32 (1): 3–17. doi:10.1177/1086026619831516. Wikidata Q126282653.
- Marc Orlitzky; Louche, Céline; Jean-Pascal Gond; Chapple, Wendy (2015). "Unpacking the Drivers of Corporate Social Performance: A Multilevel, Multistakeholder, and Multimethod Analysis". Journal of Business Ethics. 144 (1): 21–40. doi:10.1007/s10551-015-2822-y. Wikidata Q58170436.
- Lutgart Van den Berghe; Louche, Céline (2005). "The Link Between Corporate Governance and Corporate Social Responsibility in Insurance". Geneva Papers on Risk and Insurance - Issues and Practice. 30 (3): 425–442. doi:10.1057/palgrave.gpp.2510034. Wikidata Q60723763.
- Samuel O. Idowu; Louche, Céline, eds. (2011), Theory and Practice of Corporate Social Responsibility, Springer Nature, doi:10.1007/978-3-642-16461-3, Wikidata Q60723755
- Jennifer Goodman; Louche, Céline; Katinka C. van Cranenburgh; Arenas, Daniel (2013). "Social Shareholder Engagement: The Dynamics of Voice and Exit". Journal of Business Ethics. 125 (2): 193–210. doi:10.1007/s10551-013-1890-0. Wikidata Q60723739.
