= Celine Axelos =

Egyptian poet

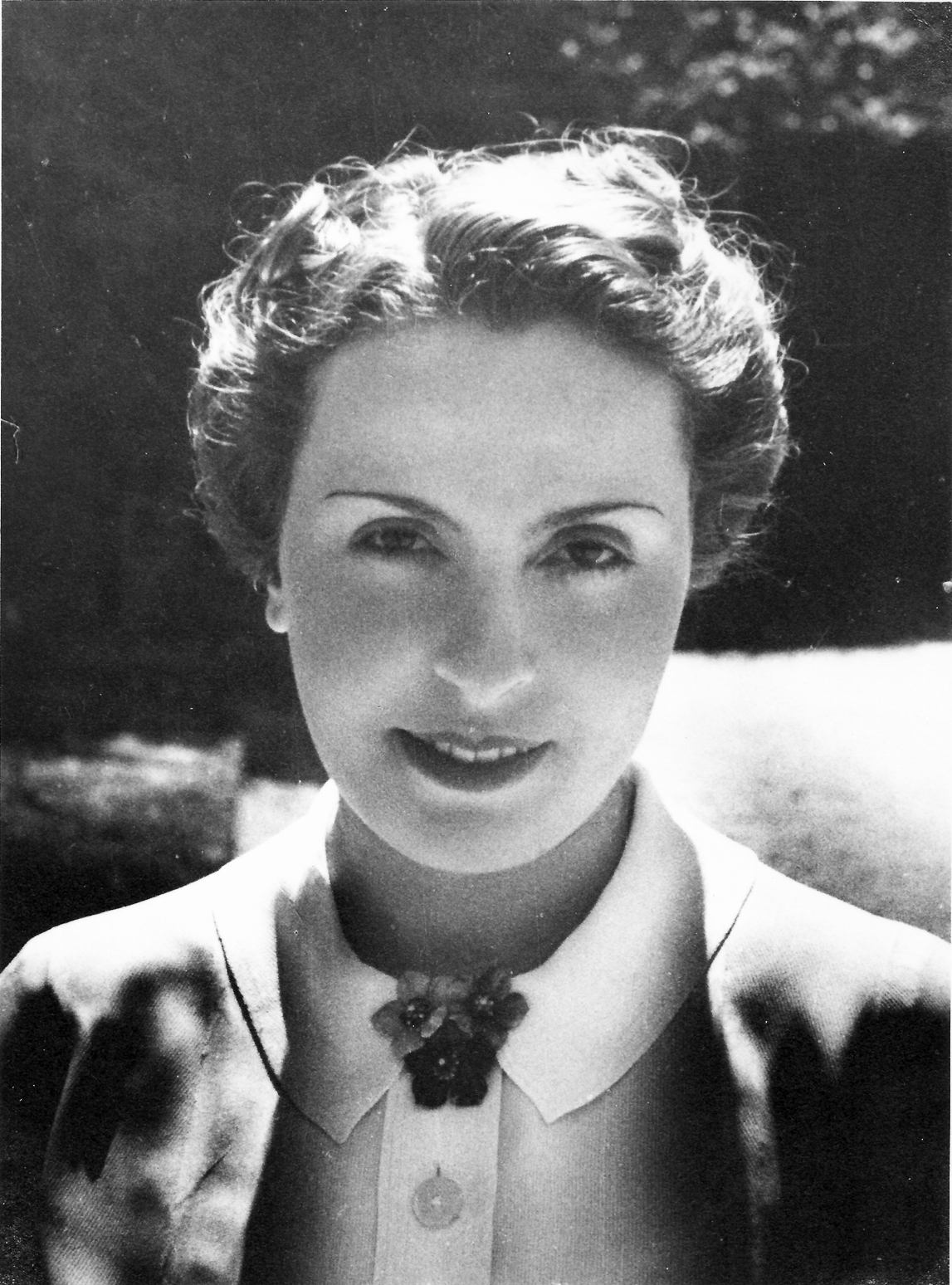
- Born: 1902; Alexandria, Egypt
- Died: 1992 (aged 89–90); Alexandria, Egypt

Celine Axelos (née Tasso; 1902–1992) was an Egyptian poet, public speaker, and woman of letters. Her older brother, René Tasso (1897–1920), was also a poet of distinction who, however, died at the young age of twenty-two from tuberculosis.

Her father was a middle class functionary of Lebanese extraction. Celine was the eldest of four girls, and lived her entire life in Alexandria, Egypt, leaving only for brief trips to the United States (once), Lebanon (generally to visit her son's family), and France.

Three weeks before her eighteenth birthday Celine married George Salm (Salem), a wealthy landowner twice her age. They had one child, Joseph. The marriage was unhappy, and her husband absconded with the three-year-old boy and deposited him in a boarding school in Virginia. A divorce ensued, and the child (who was told his mother had died) was raised in a series of boarding schools and orphanages in America. Fifteen years passed before Celine saw her only child again.

Because Mr. Salm had become an American citizen, the Egyptian government sued to expropriate his extensive landholdings. The American government funded Salm's defense, with the signature of President Herbert Hoover. The case, known as the Salem Claim, went to international arbitration in Vienna, Austria in 1931. The American side lost and Salm was dispossessed of all his Egyptian property.

In the final decades of her life, Celine Axelos retired from society and became increasingly introspective, relying on her deep Christian faith. "The ugliness of the world," she wrote in a letter, "has become odious to me..." She wrote of seeking "a spiritual ascension, the source of all true happiness." For many years the poet lived quietly in a small ninth-floor apartment on a busy Alexandria street, as her faithful maid of forty years, Sophie, brought food daily and did the housecleaning.

== Work ==
Celine Axelos credited the awakening of her interest in poetry to the time when, as a child, she listened to the poems of her elder brother, René Tasso. Her medium was French, the language spoken by the upper classes in pre-World War II Egypt. Two books of Axelos' poems, in alexandrine metre, were published during the poet's lifetime. Les Deux Chapelles ("The Two Chapels," Alexandria, Editions Cosmopolis, 1943), contains sixty-one poems from the years 1938–43. Her 1952 collection, Les Marches d'Ivoire ("The Ivory Steps," Monte Carlo, Regain), contains one hundred and one poems in five sections.

About Axelos' poetry, Parisian literary critic Yves Gandon noted: "Your great gift is that the mystic essence of your nature never borders on the insipid. You are a mystic attached to earthly glories, something rare among women poets.". In 1975, Axelos was awarded the title Chevalier dans l'Ordre des Arts et des Lettres. Leopold Senghor, President of the Republic of Senegal wrote Mme. Axelos in 1966: "In your poems I appreciate the eternal feminine and the melody of its cadence. Reading your work, I am often reminded of Marceline Desbordes-Valmore, whose work greatly affected me during my years in the Latin Quarter [of Paris]."

Axelos was well known as a conferencière . Her lectures on subjects and personalities of general interest were popular social events. Held at the Atelier d'Alexandrie, these lectures often were subsequently published as booklets.

For many years, Axelos contributed a weekly column to the Journal d'Egypte entitled Le Coin de Soleil ("The Corner of Sunlight"). Her column contained comments on current affairs, especially those dealing with arts and letters.

Unpublished are Celine Axelos' fairy tales. A manuscript collection of eight such stories remains in the possession of her heirs.

René Joseph, Celine Axelos' grandson and a composer of music, has set five of his grandmother's poems to music. The collection Chansons d'après Celine Axelos (for soprano and piano) is available from Laureate Music (2008).

A tribute to Celine Axelos appeared in book form in 1987, written by R. Lackany (President of the Atelier d'Alexandrie).
