= Céline Yandza =

Congolese politician

Céline Yandza (28 May 1932 in Brazzaville – 18 October 2013 in Brazzaville) was a Congolese politician. She became the founding president of the Revolutionary Women's Union of Congo (URFC). In 1968, she was included in the National Revolutionary Council.

Yandza was excluded from the CNR when it was reformed on 31 December 1968. On 15 November 1969 she was substituted by Joséphine Bouanga as URFC president at the second extraordinary URFC congress.
