= Abigail Merwin =

Abigail Merwin (1759–1786) was a young woman in colonial era Connecticut who, in an action similar to the celebrated call to arms by Paul Revere, alerted American forces of the approach of British forces.

On August 25, 1777, Merwin was hanging the wash outside of her home in Milford, Connecticut, when she saw rowboats bearing British troops from the warship HMS Swan, which was docked in Milford Harbor. Merwin gathered her 18-month-old child into a horse-drawn wagon and sped into Milford, where she banged a wooden spoon against a metal pot to alert the townspeople of the coming invaders. Her actions enabled the local militia to gather their weapons and successfully repel the invaders, while the local farmers were able to herd their cattle to a safe meadow.

The Captain's log of the “Swan” reads: “At 4 AM came too (sic) Sm. Br. [small bower] in 7 fs. [fathoms] water, Milford Church NWBW 2 Miles, [the steeple of the 1st Congregational church as visible from well off shore] off shore 1 Mile. Sent boats on Shore Mand & Armd [manned and armed (sic)] to bring of[f] some cattle. At 7 the boats Returned got no Cattle.” (punctuation added).

source: Milford Hall of Fame induction of Abigail Merwin, 2011. Joseph B. Barnes, Esq., Chairman of the Hall of Fame writer's committee.
