= Céline Allewaert =

Belgian spongiologist

Céline Allewaert is a Belgian spongiologist who works at Ghent University.

== Publications ==
- Allewaert, C. ; Reveillaud, J. , Pérez, T., Vacelet, J., Banaigs, B. & Vanreusel, A., 2012: Relevance of an integrative approach for taxonomic revision in sponge taxa: case study of the shallow-water Atlanto-Mediterranean Hexadella species (Porifera: Ianthellidae: Verongida). Invertebrate Systematics, 26(3): 230-248. Abstract: doi:10.1071/IS11044
