= Celine Prins =

Dutch-French strategy counsel and community coordinator (born 1984)

- Born: 1 August 1984 (age 42); Amsterdam, Netherlands

Celine Prins (born 1 August 1984) is a Dutch-French strategy counsel and community coordinator. Until 2016, Prins had also been working as entrepreneur, fashion model and actress.

== Early life and education ==
Celine Prins was born on 1 August 1984 in Amsterdam, the Netherlands. With her mother coming from France and her father being Dutch, she has two nationalities. After she graduated from high school accomplishing her VWO, she went to Spain for a gap-year to study the Spanish language. After returning from Spain, Prins studied and obtained her Master of Science degree in International Business Administration at the University of Amsterdam (ranked 2nd best Business School in Europe (2019), Triple Crown Status). In this period, Prins has been living and working abroad in various cities among which are Paris, London, Sydney, Milan and New York City. She is fluent in French, English, Dutch and Spanish.

== Career ==
=== Current career ===
Celine Prins currently works as Strategy Counsel and Community Coordinator for the Institute for Future of Living, a platform focused on needs and solutions for urban societies facing social challenges. Her work includes sustainable initiatives, healthy urban lifestyle programs, and community-based city and ecosystem projects related to entrepreneurship and innovation.

In addition, Prins is chair of the working Group Urban Society at The Alliance for Internet of Things Innovation (AIOTI), which was founded by the European Commission. AIOTI's key aim is to enhance innovation and economic development across the Internet of Things in Europe.

=== Modelling career ===
Being discovered in Barcelona at the age of 18, Prins first signed with Elite Models in Amsterdam. However, only when she signed with IMG models in Paris, Prins pursued a full-time modeling career. She worked for brands such as Tommy Hilfiger, L'Oreal, Björn Borg, Babyliss, Philips, Levi's, Diesel and was published in fashion magazines like Cosmopolitan, Elle, Elle Girl (Dutch cover), Harpers Bazar Australia, Elegance, Avantages (cover) and Marie-Claire. In 2012 she won the Dutch Model Award.

=== Entrepreneurial career ===
Celine Prins' experience as a model combined with her Business degree and entrepreneurial spirit, has led to the creation of Modellist-ID.com in 2012 and thereby Prins was one of the founders and CEO of organization. The concept for this company found its roots in her own experiences as a model and the various difficulties models face when travelling and living abroad by themselves at a very young age. The community offered a variety of services to support their lives on several domains like amongst other; legal, financial, health and network support. Modellist-ID used to be the biggest community in the world. In 2016 the founders decided to hand over the operational role to a new team who then created an influencer agency under a new name.

=== Acting career ===
With a creative spirit, Prins had always been drawn to singing and acting. It was only until she attended The Lee Strasberg Theatre & Film Institute in New York City, that acting became part of her career. Since 2008 she has played in several TV series and movies.
