= Amandine Vaupré =

French rugby union player

- Born: 22 April 1982 (age 44)
- Height: 1.7 m (5 ft 7 in)
- Weight: 65 kg (143 lb)

Rugby union career
- Position: Hooker
International career
Years	Team	Apps	(Points)
- France
National sevens team
Years	Team		Comps
2012	France		

Amandine Vaupré (born 22 April 1982) is a French rugby union player. She represented France at the 2010 Women's Rugby World Cup. Vaupré was a swimmer as a young girl and also participated in Judo.
