= Mervyn =

- Gender: Masculine

Origin
- Origin: Welsh

Other names
- Related names: Mervin, Merfyn, Merwin, Marvin

Mervyn is a masculine given name and occasionally a surname which is of Old Welsh origin, with elements mer, probably meaning "marrow", and myn, meaning "eminent".

Despite the misconception of the letter 'V' being an English spelling, through Roman occupation of Britain, the Welsh language (at least for spelling) was Latinised and through centuries of evolution of the Welsh language, the modern Welsh spelling for Mervyn is Merfyn.

== People with the given name ==
- Mervyn or Merfyn Frych, king of Gwynedd (c. 825 – c. 844)
- Mervyn Archdall (disambiguation), various people
- Mervyn S. Bennion (1887–1941), US Navy captain killed in the attack on Pearl Harbor, posthumously awarded the Medal of Honor
- Mervyn Bishop (born 1945), professional photographer, the first Aboriginal Australian to work on a metropolitan daily newspaper
- Mervyn Carrick (born 1946), Northern Ireland politician
- Mervyn Davies, Baron Davies of Abersoch (born 1952), former banker and UK government minister
- Mervyn Davies (1946–2012), Welsh former rugby union player
- Mervyn Twynam Davis (Miss)(1916–1985), Australian landscape architect
- Mervyn Day (born 1955), English former football goalkeeper
- Mervyn de Silva (1929-1999), Sri Lankan Sinhala journalist
- Mervyn Dillon (born 1974), West Indian cricketer
- Mervyn M. Dymally (1926–2012), American politician, first Trinidadian Lieutenant Governor of California
- Mervyn Fernandez (born 1959), former National Football League and Canadian Football League wide receiver
- Mervyn Fonseka, Solicitor General of Sri Lanka from 1943 to 1945
- Merv Griffin (1925-2007), American singer, television host and media mogul
- Merv Harvey (1918–1995), Australian cricketer
- Mervyn Hill (1902–1948), Welsh cricketer
- Merv Hughes (born 1961), Australian cricketer
- Mervyn Jayasuriya (died 2008), Sri Lankan Sinhala radio announcer
- Mervyn Johns (1899–1992), Welsh film and television actor
- Mervyn King (economist) (born 1948), British economist, Governor of the Bank of England
- Mervyn King (judge), former judge of the Supreme Court of South Africa and chairman of the King Committee on Corporate Governance
- Mervyn King (darts player) (born 1966), British darts player
- Mervyn King (bowls) (born 1966), English bowls player
- Mervyn Kitchen (born 1940), English former first-class cricketer and international umpire
- Mervyn LeRoy (1900–1987), American film director, producer and sometime actor
- Mervyn Maynard (c. 1931-2017), Aboriginal Australian jockey
- Mervyn Middlecoat (1940–1971), Pakistan Air Force wing commander
- Mervyn Peake (1911–1968), English modernist writer, artist, poet and illustrator, best known for his Gormenghast series
- Mervyn Pike, Baroness Pike (1918–2004), British politician
- Mervyn Rose (1930–2017), Australian tennis player
- Mervyn Silva (born 1944), controversial Sri Lankan politician
- Mervyn Spence (born 1958), Northern Irish musician
- Mervyn Stockwood (1913–1995), Anglican Bishop of Southwark
- Mervyn Taylor (1931–2021), Irish former politician
- Mervyn Tuchet, 2nd Earl of Castlehaven (1593–1631), English nobleman convicted of rape and sodomy
- Mervyn Warren (born 1964), American film composer, record producer, songwriter, pianist and vocalist
- Muff Winwood (born 1943), English songwriter and record producer
- Mervyn Wood (1917–2006), Australian rower

== People with the surname ==
- Audley Mervyn (1603?–1675), lawyer and politician in Ireland
- Audley Mervyn (died 1717), Irish MP for Strabane and County Tyrone - see County Tyrone (Parliament of Ireland constituency)
- Audley Mervyn (died 1746), Irish MP for County Tyrone - see County Tyrone (Parliament of Ireland constituency)
- William Mervyn (1912–1976), English actor

== Fictional characters ==
- Mervyn Bunter, a butler in Dorothy Sayers' stories featuring Lord Peter Wimsey
- Mervyn Pumpkinhead, in The Sandman comic book
- Mervyn, Sheriff of Rottingham, in the Mel Brooks film Robin Hood: Men in Tights
- Sir Mervyn, an elderly paladin in the video game Dragon Quest VII
- Mervyn Hogarth, a character in Muriel Spark's debut 1957 novel The Comforters
- the title character of Arthur Mervyn, a 1799 novel written by Charles Brockden Brown

== See also ==
- Mervyn's, a defunct American department store chain
- Mervin (disambiguation)
- Merwin (disambiguation)
