= Celine Tendobi =

Congolese obstetrics and gynecology

Doctor Céline Tendobi
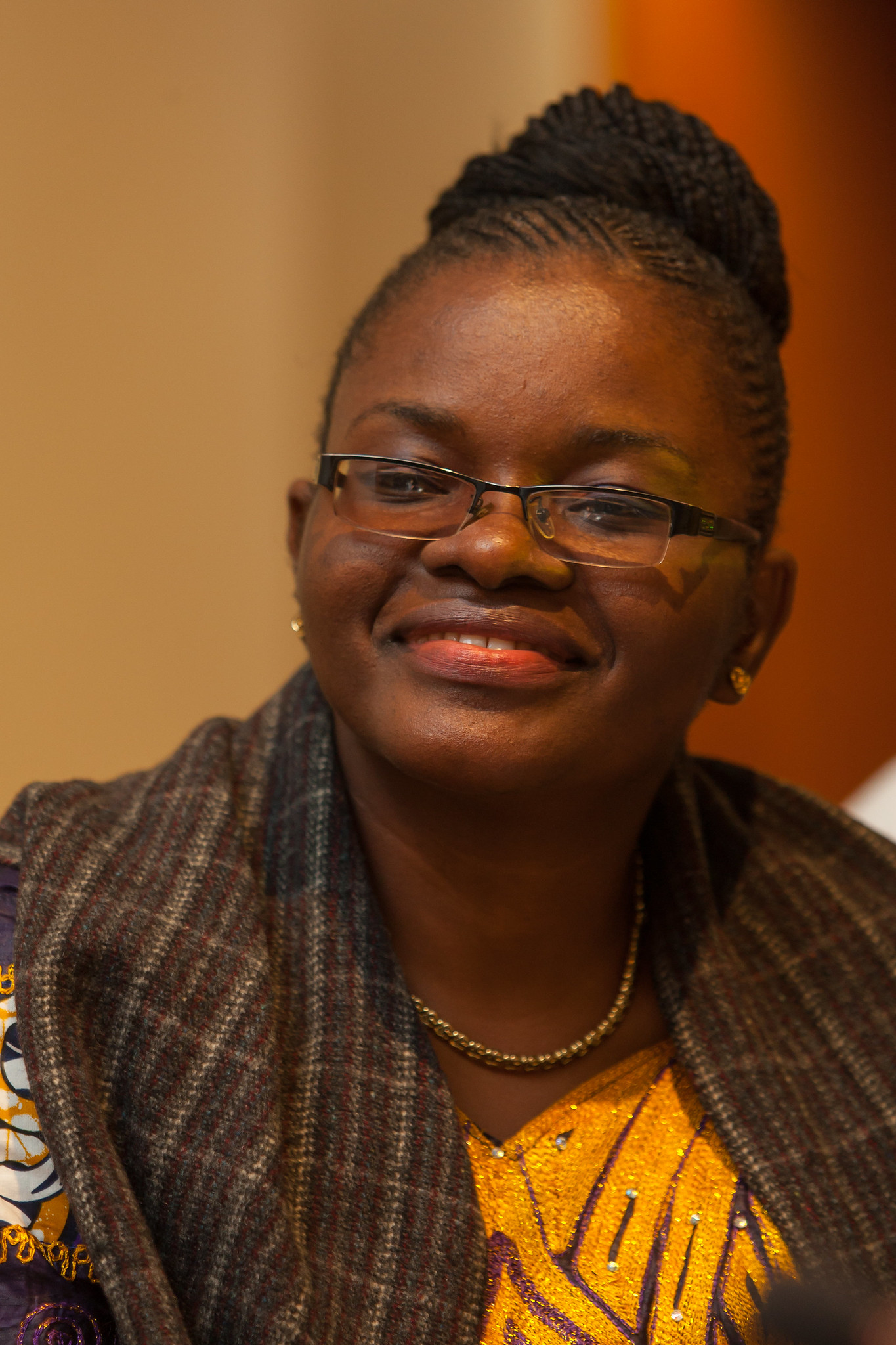
- Born: 1974 (age 51–52); Kinshasa
- Education: University of Kinshasa
- Occupation: Gynecologist
- Employer: Centre Hospitalier Monkole
- Known for: HPV and cervical cancer research

Céline Tendobi (born c. 1974) is a Congolese doctor of obstetrics and gynecology with a specialty in gynaecology and ultrasound. She is known for her work on the human papilloma virus (HPV) and has written extensively on the connection between HPV and cervical cancer in the Democratic Republic of the Congo.

== Early life and education ==
Celine Tendobi was born in 1974 in Kinshasa, Democratic Republic of the Congo. She attended the University of Kinshasa. In 2004, she went to Spain to train as an ultrasound in Obstetrics and Gynecology at the University of Navarra Clinic in Madrid.

== Career ==
Tendobi works with the Monkole Hospital in Kinshasa as the head of the Gynecology Service. She additionally works for the department of gynecology at the University of Kinshasha Hospital.

In 2017, Tendobi helped enact the ELIKIA Project at Monkole Hospital, which offered low-cost cervical cancer screenings for patients. The project, a partnership between Monkole, the University of Navarra and a consortium of international partners, has helped reduce the progression of HPV to cervical cancer in the Monkole patient population.

During the COVID-19 pandemic and the shortage of medical staff in Spain, she volunteered to work for University of Navarra Clinic. She returned to Monkole Hospital where she worked at the Congo's COVID Center during the lockdown. Tendobi has remained in the Congo to combat the brain drain of professionals in the country, despite the opportunity to earn more in the west.

In 2021, Dr. Celine Tendobi was awarded a Guadalupe Scholarship Project for her work to detect human papilloma virus in women before it evolves into cancer.

=== Awards and honors ===
- Harambee Prize 2014
- Guadalupe Scholarship
- Harambee Spain Prize (2013) for the Promotion and Equality of African Women
