= Merwin Sibulkin =

American scientist

Merwin Sibulkin (1926–2006) was an American scientist active in the field of aerodynamics, fluid mechanics, heat transfer and combustion.

== Early life and education ==
A World War II Navy veteran, he earned his PhD at California Institute of Technology in 1956.

== Career ==
Sibulkin worked at General Dynamics in San Diego, California until 1963, and then became professor at the Division of Engineering at Brown University.

Sibulkin was particularly known for his work on investigating drag around air intakes on jet-propelled aircraft.

Sibulkin was also once involved in an experiment trying to investigate if the coriolis force due to the rotation of the Earth could be seen in the form of spiraling water around the outlet when draining a bath tub. He was, however, unsuccessful.

== Selected publications ==
- Transition from Turbulent to Laminar Pipe Flow, Defense Technical Information Center, 1961
- A note on the bathtub vortex, General Dynamics/Astronautics, San Diego, California
- Unsteady, viscous, circular flow Part 3. Application to the Ranque-Hilsch vortex tube, Convair Scientific Research Laboratory, San Diego
- "Boundary-Layer Measurements at Supersonic Nozzle Throats", Journal of the Aeronautical Sciences, Vol. 24, No. 4 (1957), pp. 249–252.

== Personal ==
Sibulkil was married to Lucinda, née Weiss.
