= Céline Narmadji =

Chadian human rights activist

Céline Narmadji (born 1964) is a Chadian human rights activist. A member of the Chadian Human Rights League since 1992, she has headed the Association of Women for Development and a Culture of Peace in Chad since 2004. In 2016, she was arrested for participating in a demonstration against the re-election of President Idriss Déby for a fifth term and held in prison for three weeks. As of mid-2021, she continues to uphold human rights, campaigning against unacceptable conditions for those sent off to work in the country's gold mines.

== Biography ==
Born in Chad's capital N'Djamena (formerly Fort Lamy) on 29 October 1964, Céline Narmadji was brought up in a modest home by a father who worked for the Ministry of Agriculture as a technician and a mother who took care of the family. She has been active in supporting human rights and women's rights since the early 1990s. While participating in the Chadian Human Rights League (Ligue tchadienne des droits de l'Homme) and the Association of Women for Development and a Culture of Peace in Chad (Association des femmes pour le développement et la culture de la paix au Tchad), she arranged training facilities for women and children in various parts of the country and campaigned against the mistreatment of women and child slavery.

In October 2014, she became the spokesperson for Enough is Enough (Trop c'est trop), which brought together some 15 civil rights organizations striving to improve conditions for the local population. She organized demonstrations against human rights violations and the mismanagement of public assets by encouraging the clanging of pots and pans and instigating "dead city days". In 2016, the coalition arranged protests against the re-election of President Déby for a fifth term. In March 2016, a month before the 2016 election, Narmadji was arrested for "opposing a legitimate authority, attempting to disrupt public order and encouraging an unarmed gathering." On 14 April 2016, she was sentenced to four months' suspended imprisonment but was in fact held for three weeks in Amsinéné Prison together with other activists.

Undeterred by her treatment, Narmadji has continued to fight for human rights both nationally and internationally. In her own words, "Our fight is aimed at achieving lasting change so that our children and grandchildren can live in peace in this country." In the summer of 2021, she was focusing on preventing the exploitation of young Chadians who were being sent from their villages to work in the gold mines in the far north of Chad and in the south of Libya. She believed the practice could be discontinued by informing village leaders and local communities of the mistreatment their youths were subjected to while working under slave-like conditions in the mines.

== See also ==
- Human rights in Chad
