= Mervyn Hamilton Rylance =

Merv Rylance
- Born: Mervyn Hamilton Rylance; 20 March 1906 Eagle Junction, Queensland
- Died: c. 1983

Rugby union career
- Position: ?
International career
Years	Team	Apps	(Points)
1926	Wallabies	1	(0)

Mervyn Hamilton Rylance (1906–1983) was a rugby union player and architect in Brisbane, Queensland, Australia. He was represented Australia in rugby union. He is also known for his domestic architecture in the Mediterranean Revival style; a number of his works are now heritage-listed.

== Early life ==
Mervyn Hamilton Rylance was born on 20 March 1906 in Eagle Junction, Brisbane, the son of Percy Douglas and his wife Florence Mary (née Smellie).

Rylance played in the Australian rugby union in the match Australia v New Zealand XV at Sydney on 29 July 1926.

== Career ==
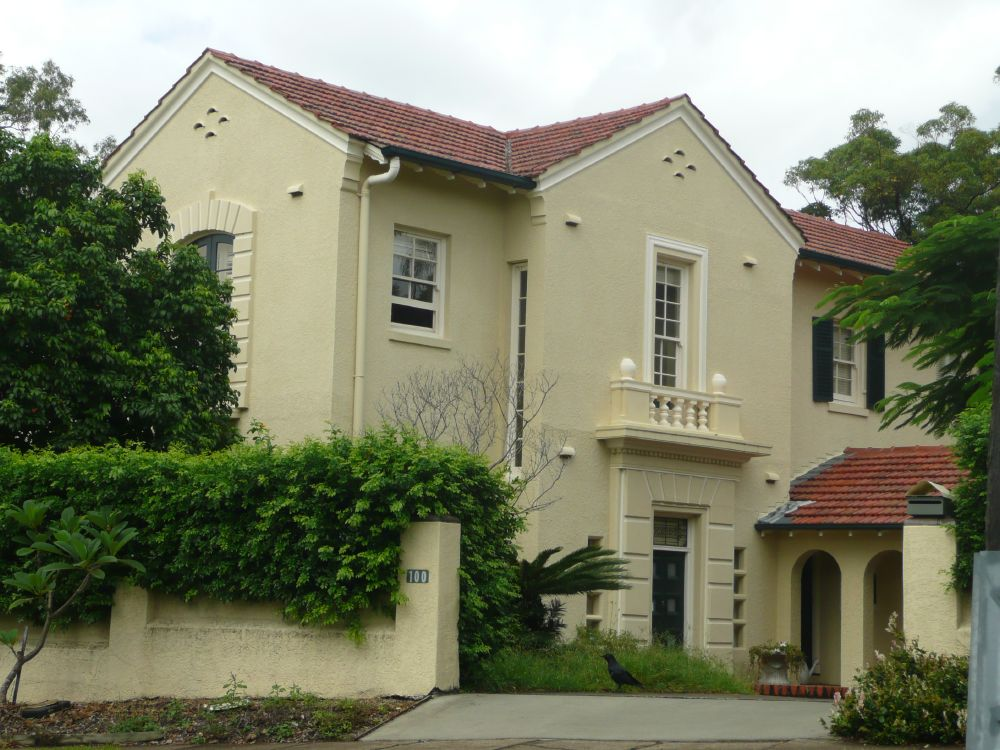
Oorgarding, one of Rylance's works, 2009

Rylance opened his architectural practice in Brisbane in 1933 and domestic commissions formed the basis of his practice. In the period up until World War II, he designed a number of relatively expensive and substantial homes in both the English and Mediterranean styles. The Mediterranean style established itself strongly in the temperate parts of Australia in the interwar period. This was largely due to the efforts of its central proponent, Professor Leslie Wilkinson and through his position as the first chair of architecture at an Australian university. Wilkinson was able to influence many architects with his ideas about the suitability of Mediterranean styled architecture for the Australian climate. In effect, the style was a regionalisation of Georgian domestic architecture and avoided blatant Mediterranean features such as those adopted in Spanish Mission architecture, preferring classical details, smooth render, soft tones and round arches that simply evoked a Mediterranean feeling.

Mervyn Rylance was one of these young architects influenced by Wilkinson's ideas. Although he was born in Brisbane, Rylance was educated in Sydney and England and was an articled pupil with Joseland and Gilling Architects in Sydney. F Glynn Gilling was recognised as a leading practitioner of the Mediterranean Style and his Woolcock Forbes house was to have a lasting influence on Rylance. Very few pure Mediterranean Style houses were built in Brisbane and Rylance was responsible for the design of a number of key examples including the Blanchard House at 43 Maxwell Street, New Farm, the Bartlett House at 390 Swann Road, St. Lucia and Oogarding in Bardon.

== Later life ==
Mervyn Rylance died on 22 December 1983 in Queensland.

== Works ==
His works include:

- Jolly residence, 2 Atthow Avenue, Ashgrove
- Residence "Ravenscraig", 223 Maundrell Terrace, Aspley
- Oogarding, 100 Simpsons Road, Bardon.
- Giles Residence, 147 Dornoch Terrace, Highgate Hill
- Residence "The Moorings", 1 Riverview Court, New Farm
- Thompson Residence, 93 Ryans Road, St Lucia
- The Bartlett Residence "Fairways" – 390 Swann Road, St Lucia

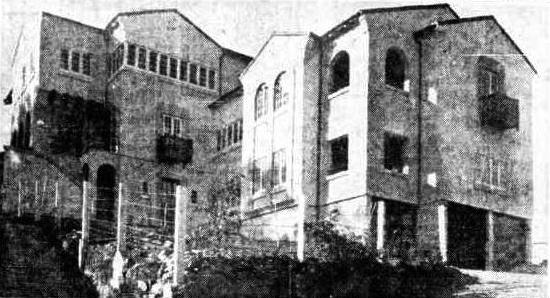
Evesham Flats, Hamilton, 1937

=== Evesham Flats ===
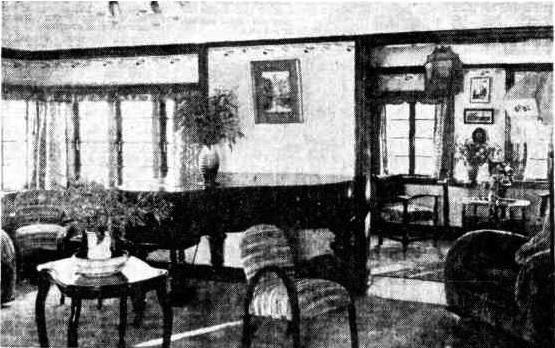
Penthouse living room, Evesham, 1937

Evesham Flats is an art deco block of four flats at 7 Quarry Street, Hamilton in Brisbane. Evesham was built for Evelyn Thomason (nee Horsman), who commissioned Rylance to design Evesham as a block of four flats with the penthouse flat intended to be her personal residence. Completed in June 1937, Evesham's stuccoed walls, Juliette balconies, asymmetrical massing and numerous arched windows reflect the popular inter-War Spanish Mission architectural style. Having regard to the building's prominent location overlooking the Hamilton Reach of the Brisbane River, Rylance designed the top left section of the building, above the exterior staircase, to resemble the bridge of an outgoing steamer. From a distance it was intended to appear like a riverside mansion. Each of the apartments is spacious with its own entrance. The rear two apartments included maids’ quarters. Reflecting a modern style of living of those times, features of the apartments included open plan living areas, built-in wardrobes and cupboards, as well as gas hot water heaters. The building features an abundant use of casement windows to capture cooling river breezes and to maximise the panoramic views over the river and neighbouring suburbs.

Notable residents of Evesham included German soprano Madame Lotte Lehmann, during her May 1939 season at Brisbane City Hall, and Sydney A. Deacon, British Trade Commissioner to Queensland (1946 to 1949).
