= Maria Gallo =

Canadian rugby union player

Maria Eugenia Gallo
- Born: September 21, 1977 (age 49) Argentina
- Height: 168 cm (5 ft 6 in)
- Weight: 72 kg (159 lb)
- University: University of Guelph; University of Alberta
- Occupation(s): Senior Instructor and Director, Masters of High Performance Coaching & Technical Leadership Program at University of British Columbia

Rugby union career
- Position(s): Centre (15s), Wing (15s), Hooker (7s)
Amateur team(s)
Years	Team	Apps	(Points)
–	Burnaby Lake Rugby Club		
–	Leprechaun Tiger Club		
–	Guelph Gryphons		
–	Alberta Pandas		
–	Canada Fergus Highland		
Provincial / State sides
Years	Team	Apps	(Points)
1997?-2000?	Ontario		
International career
Years	Team	Apps	(Points)
1999-2010	Canada	55	
National sevens team
Years	Team		Comps
2008-2010	Canada		2009 RWC7s
Coaching career
- Years: Team
- 2015-: UBC Thunderbirds

Dr. Maria Eugenia Gallo (born 21 September 1977) is a Canadian rugby player with 55 caps including the 2002 and 2006 Women's Rugby World Cup. A multi-talented athlete, Gallo was also a member of Canada's National Bobsleigh Team for two years (2003–04).

She was inducted in the Rugby Canada Hall of Fame in 2018 in the player category. Gallo is the second woman to be inducted into the Rugby Canada Hall of Fame. Gallo is considered one of the top ten North American women rugby union players. Her team nickname is "the Tank".

Gallo represented Ontario winning the 1997, 1998, 1999, and 2000 national championship. In university, she played for the University of Guelph Guelph Gryphons and University of Alberta Alberta Pandas. During this time, she received the Guelph University Female athlete of the year award in 1998, as well as OUA All-Star awards in 1997 and 1998. Gallo has a doctorate in muscle physiology/biochemistry from the University of Alberta.

From 1999 to 2010, she was a member of the Canadian Women's Senior 15's National Team, serving as vice-captain. During her tenure with the national team she earned 55 caps and represented her country at the 2002 and 2006 World Cups. She spent two years with the Canadian Women's National 7's Team (2008-2010) where she was named team captain and led her country to the first Rugby World Cup Sevens in 2009. She played center and wing in 15s, and hooker in 7s.

Since 2015, she is part of the coaching staff for the UBC Thunderbirds women's rugby coach. For the past decade, Gallo has been a Pathway coach to the National 15's and 7's programs.

In 2018, Gallo was inducted in the Ontario Rugby Hall of Fame.

After Gallo completed her post-doc in blood doping at UBC, she is now an instructor at the School of Kinesiology.
