= Aïda Ba =

French rugby union player (1983–2022)

- Born: 27 June 1983
- Died: 3 October 2022 (aged 39)

Rugby union career
- Position: Third line
Senior career
Years	Team	Apps	(Points)
2003–2006	AC Bobigny 93	?	(?)
2006–2007	Lons Section paloise	?	(?)
2007–?	AC Bobigny 93	?	(?)
International career
Years	Team	Apps	(Points)
2007-2012	France	17	(?)

Aïda Ba’s rugby jersey

Aïda Ba (27 June 1983 – 3 October 2022) was a French rugby union player who played at third line.

== Biography ==
Ba discovered rugby in 2001 and formed the team AC Bobigny 93 while at Sorbonne Paris North University, becoming its first captain. She signed with Lons Section paloise in 2006, but missed the season while sidelined with a knee ligament injury, for which she was compensated by her investments in Béarn Rugby Cité. She played for the French national team in the 2007 Women's Six Nations Championship.

Aïda Ba died of breast cancer on 3 October 2022, at the age of 39.
