= 1996 Palanca Awards =

Philippine literary award

46th Palanca Palanca Awards

The 46th Carlos Palanca Memorial Awards for Literature was held to commemorate the memory of Carlos T. Palanca, Sr. through an endeavor that would promote education and culture in the country.

Ma. Luisa A. Igloria was this year's Palanca Hall of Fame awardee. Igloria clinched her fifth first prize for “Translations in the Wilderness: The Politics and Aesthetics of Subduing Colonial Spaces” under the Essay category. The said award is given to writers who have won five first places in any category.

LIST OF WINNERS

The 1996 winners were divided into sixteen categories, open only to English and Filipino [Tagalog] novel, short story, short story for children, poetry, essay, one-act play, and full-length play, plus the Dulang Pantelebisyon and Dulang Pampelikula, open only for the Filipino Division:

== English Division ==
=== Novel ===
- Grand Prize: Cristina Pantoja-Hidalgo, Recuerdo

=== Short Story ===
- First Prize: Carlos Ojeda Aureus, “The Late Comer”
- Second Prize: Antonio Jocson, “Memory of Walking”
- Third Prize: Carmelo Juino, S.J., “The Fairy Prinsoid”

=== Short Story for Children ===
- First Prize: Lakambini A. Sitoy, “Pure Magic”
- Second Prize: Lina B. Diaz de Rivera, “The Gem”
- Third Prize: Angelo Rodriguez Lacuesta, “The Daughter of the Wind”

=== Poetry ===
- First Prize: Ramil Digal Gulle, “Twenty-fifth Fly”
- Second Prize: Ruel S. De Vera, “Something Like Remembrance”
- Third Prize: Conchitina Cruz, “Second Skin”

=== Essay ===
- First Prize: Ma. Luisa A. Igloria, “Translations in the Wilderness: The Politics and Aesthetics of Subduing Colonial Spaces”
- Second Prize: Jose Wendell Capili, “Short Circuit: Expariate Themes in Philippine Poetry in English”
- Third Prize: Joselito Zulueta, “The Irish Bard”

=== One-Act Play ===
- First Prize: No Winner
- Second Prize: No Winner
- Third Prize: Glenn Sevilla Mas, “The Feline Curse”

=== Full-Length Play ===
- First Prize: No Winner
- Second Prize: No Winner
- Third Prize: No Winner

== Filipino Division ==
=== Nobela ===
- Grand Prize: Edmund Coronel, Malaybay

=== Maikling Kwento ===
- First Prize: Levy Balgos Dela Cruz, “Pag-uugat, Pagpapakpak”
- Second Prize: Eli Rueda Guieb III, “Kasal”
- Third Prize: Jimmuel C. Naval, “Miss Jones”

=== Maikling Kwentong Pambata ===
- First Prize: Renato Vibiesca, “Ang Tsinelas ni Inoy”
- Second Prize: Ma. Corazon Paulina Remegio, “Tuldok”
- Third Prize: Rebecca T. Añonuevo, “Ang Mahiyaing Manok”

=== Tula ===
- First Prize: Roberto T. Añonuevo, “Lupain ng Kapangyarihan”
- Second Prize: Rebecca T. Añonuevo, “Bago ang Babae”
- Third Prize: Luna Sicat-Cleto, “Bago Mo Ako Ipalaot”

=== Sanaysay ===
- First Prize: Buenaventura S. Medina Jr., “Tadhana at Talinhaga”
- Second Prize: Ma. Stella Valdez, “Nang Binihag ng Titik ang Bibig”
- Third Prize: Josephine Barrios, “Pagsusuri at Pagkabighani sa mga Nobela ng Pag-ibig”

=== Dulang May Isang Yugto ===
- First Prize: Jose Victor Z. Torres, “Huling Panauhin”
- Second Prize: Jose Jay B. Cruz, “Ang Mahabang Patlang ay Isang Malaking Katanungan”
- Third Prize: Mervin C. Salazar, “Lipad, Narda, Lipad”

=== Dulang Ganap ang Haba ===
- First Prize: No Winner
- Second Prize: Rodolfo C. Vera, “Balanggiga”
- Third Prize: Jose Bernard Capino, “Los Indios Bravos”

=== Dulang Pantelebisyon ===
- First Prize: Rodolfo R. Lana Jr., “Sa Daigdig ng mga Taksil”
- Second Prize: Rolando F. Santos, “Closing Time”
- Third Prize: Ma. Clarissa Estuar, “Sa Bingit ng Bagong Buhay”

=== Dulang Pampelikula ===
- First Prize: Rodolfo R. Lana Jr., "Mga Bangka sa Tag-araw"
- Second Prize: No Winner
- Third Prize: No Winner

== Sources ==
- "The Don Carlos Palanca Memorial Awards for Literature | Winners 1996". Archived from the original on 2009-10-22.
