= Stéphanie Provost =

French rugby union player

- Born: 27 May 1973 (age 53)
- Height: 1.68 m (5 ft 6 in)
- Weight: 60 kg (132 lb)

Rugby union career
- Position: Scrumhalf
Senior career
Years	Team	Apps	(Points)
- Ovalie Caennaise
International career
Years	Team	Apps	(Points)
	France	76	

Stéphanie Provost (born 27 May 1973) is a French female rugby union player, who has played as a scrum-half. She represented France at the 2002 Women's Rugby World Cup, 2006 Women's Rugby World Cup, and 2010 Women's Rugby World Cup. She captained the French national team in 2003 and 2004. She is the third most capped French female rugby player. She is a Physical Education teacher.
