= Mervin D. Garretson =

American educator and advocate for the rights of deaf people

- Born: July 25, 1923; Sheridan, Wyoming
- Died: January 9, 2013 (aged 89); Summerfield, Florida
- Occupation: Educator
- Known for: Deaf rights activism

Mervin "Merv" Donald Garretson (July 25, 1923 – January 9, 2013) was an American educator, leader, and deaf community rights advocate. His works were primarily directed towards changing mainstream opinion about deaf culture and about the deaf community.

== Early life and education ==
Garretson was born on July 25, 1923, in Sheridan, Wyoming. He was his parents' ninth child. His father was a rancher and a general store proprietor alongside being a teacher. Garretson was the only deaf child of his parents among their ten offspring. He was not deaf by birth, instead he lost his hearing ability at the age of five after he was affected by spinal meningitis.

He received his early education from the Colorado School for the Deaf and his bachelor's degree from Gallaudet College, Washington D.C. in 1947. After that, he acquired his master's degree from the University of Wyoming in 1955.

== Personal life ==
Garretson's first marriage with Audrey Watson Garretson with whom he had two daughters, Randee Garretson and Shelley Garretson, ended in divorce in 1953. After that, he was married for 57 years to Carol Jean Kaull Garretson with whom he had three daughters – Kyrie Garretson, Kaja Farnsworth, and Kelsi Oswald. At the time of his death Garretson had seven grandchildren and four great-grandchildren.

He lived in north central Florida during the last years of his life with his second wife, Carol. She was a retired professor of communications at Gallaudet University. She, like her husband, had become deaf at an early age. Carol died on November 28, 2012, in Summerfield, Florida. The cause of death was reported to be complications from diabetes. Garretson died on January 9, 2013 (aged 89 years), of complications of pneumonia at the Leesburg Regional Medical Center in Summerfield, Florida.

== Professional life ==
Garretson began his teaching and administrative career after graduating from Gallaudet University in 1947. He taught at the Maryland School for the Deaf from 1947 to 1949 and at Montana School for the Deaf from 1949 to 1962. Seven years after completing his master's degree, he joined as the associate professor of education at Gallaudet University in 1962.

In 1967, he was appointed at the Council of Organizations Serving the Deaf as its first executive director. He returned to Gallaudet in 1970 to serve as the principal of the newly formed Model Secondary School for the Deaf.

He was a member of the 1956 meeting, named Fulton Tontine, of the national leaders that mapped the structure of the National Association of the Deaf (NAD) and served as the junior national director of the association from 1960 until 1962. He also served on the board of directors of NAD from 1960 to 1967. He then held the secretary-treasurer, vice president, and president roles at NAD between 1974 and 1982. His credentials led him to serve as a member of the board of directors of the World Federation of the Deaf (WFD). From 1971 to 1991, Garretson served as the international president of the Commission on Pedagogy; he was the first deaf person to hold this position.

During his career, he also served as the coordinator of The Deaf Way, which was an international conference that celebrated the deaf culture worldwide. He also served as the interim executive director of the NAD from 1989 until 1990. Moreover, he was also a member of Gallaudet University's board of trustees between 1990 and 2000.

Garretson authored books in both poetry and prose. His notable works include

- Words from a Deaf Child and Other Verses (1984)
- Perspectives on Deafness (A Deaf American Monograph, Vol. 41, Nos. 1 2) (1991)
- Deafness: Life and Culture (1994)
- My Yesterdays: In a Changing World of the Deaf (2010)

=== Contributions to the deaf community ===
Garretson played a vital role in highlighting issues regarding deaf education. He was a special assistant to four Gallaudet presidents to serve deaf education directives and worked to help American Sign Language gain academic recognition. His services to The Deaf Way conference also helped in shaping the deaf culture and setting the precedent for the emerging field of deaf studies. His efforts helped in increasing the employability of deaf teachers in deaf schools and promoting deaf leadership in both national and international educational organizations.

In 1947, Garretson wrote "To You Who Do Not Understand", a piece that rejected the stereotype that people with deafness were somehow inferior to people who could hear. Through this, he argued that people with hearing disabilities are not "handicapped." This was an idea that was widely applauded and set the precedent for his struggles for the deaf community.

=== Awards and recognition ===
- International Solidarity Medal (1975) – World Federation of the Deaf
- Powrie Vaux Doctor Medallion for International Service (1986)
- Frederick C. Schreiber Distinguished Service Award (1988) – NAD
- Honorary Doctor of Law degree in 1974 from Gallaudet College
- Honorary doctorate in 1993 from the Rochester Institute of Technology

To honor his contributions to deaf education, Gallaudet University established the Mervin D. and Carol J. Garretson Scholarship Fund.

== See also ==
- My Yesterdays--In a Changing World of the Deaf, by Merv Garretson, 2010 (self-published).
