= Barbara Mervin =

Canadian rugby union player

- Born: April 1, 1982 (age 44) St. John's, Newfoundland and Labrador
- Height: 1.73 m (5 ft 8 in)
- Weight: 70 kg (154 lb)
- University: University of Western Ontario
- Occupation: Sports fashion entrepreneur

Rugby union career
- Position: Loose forward
Amateur team(s)
Years	Team	Apps	(Points)
–	Western Mustangs		
–	Peterborough Pagans		
–	Velox Valkyries		
Senior career
Years	Team	Apps	(Points)
- British Columbia
International career
Years	Team	Apps	(Points)
2004–present	Canada	25	
National sevens team
Years	Team		Comps
2012	Canada		
Coaching career
- Years: Team
- –: Victoria Vikes
Medal record
Women's rugby union
Representing Canada
World Cup
Silver medal – second place	2014 France	Team competition

Barbara Mervin (born April 1, 1982) is a Canadian rugby union player also known affectionately as Swevin Mervin. She represented Canada at the 2014 Women's Rugby World Cup. She broke a bone in her right hand in Canada's first World Cup match against Spain and missed out on the rest of the World Cup in France. Mervin was a member of the Canadian sevens team that won the 2012 Las Vegas Sevens.

Mervin graduated from the University of Western Ontario with a Bachelor's degree in art history and she also has a diploma in fashion design from the Pacific Design Academy in Victoria, British Columbia.

Mervin coaches the University of Victoria Vikes. She also founded a clothesline company called Aptoella Rugby Apparel.

== Honours ==
- 2005 CIS National Player of the Year
- CIS Rookie of the Year Award
- CIS National Champion x2
