= Céline Allainmat =

French rugby union player

- Born: 7 August 1982 (age 44)
- Height: 1.63 m (5 ft 4 in)

Rugby union career
- Position: Wing
Senior career
Years	Team	Apps	(Points)
- Stade Rennais
International career
Years	Team	Apps	(Points)
2003	France	34	
National sevens team
Years	Team		Comps
- France

Céline Allainmat (born 7 August 1982) is a French female rugby union player. She represented France at the 2006 Women's Rugby World Cup, and 2010 Women's Rugby World Cup.

She has also worked as fitness coach to the France U20 women's team.
