= Leslie Wilkinson =

UK-born Australian architect and academic

Leslie Wilkinson OBE
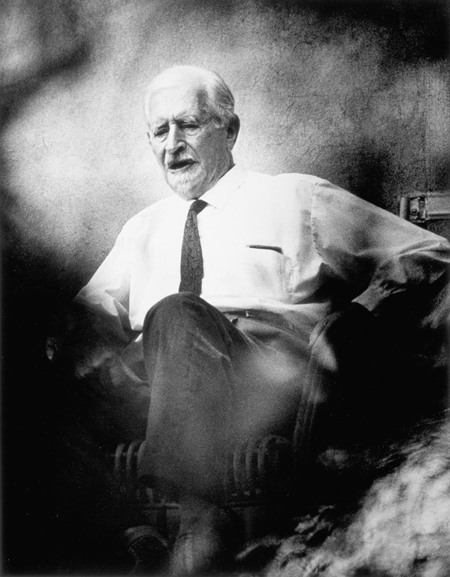
- Professor Leslie Wilkinson by Anthony Browell
- Born: 12 October 1882; New Southgate, Middlesex, England
- Died: 20 September 1973 (aged 90); Vaucluse, New South Wales, Australia
- Other names: Wilkie, Prof
- Education: Royal Academy of Arts
- Occupation: Architect
- Spouse: Bridget Wilkinson
- Children: George Wilkinson
- Awards: Sulman Medal, 1934 & 1942
- Practice: University of Sydney
- Buildings: Quadrangle Building, Ways Terrace, Wiston Gardens
- Projects: University of Sydney masterplan

Leslie Wilkinson OBE, FRAIA, ARIBA (12 October 1882 – 20 September 1973) was a UK-born Australian architect and academic. He was the founding dean of the faculty of architecture at University of Sydney in 1920 to 1947. A traditionalist, he is known for residential and church architecture.

== Early life and education ==
Leslie Wilkinson was born on 12 October 1882 at New Southgate, Middlesex, England, the younger son of commercial clerk Edward Henry Wilkinson.

In his early years, he studied at St Edward's School, Oxford and at the Royal Academy of Arts, London, winning several awards, including the touring scholarship (1904,1905) that allowed him to travel to France, Italy, Spain and England. It was in these early years that his love of Mediterranean and Italian Renaissance architecture developed. In 1903, Wilkinson had become assistant to noted architect James Gibson, while also studying and entering competitions.

== Career ==
Wilkinson was an associate of the Royal Institute of British Architects in 1907. In 1908, he became Professor F. M. Simpson's assistant at University College in London and later became assistant professor. He enlisted in the Territorial Force during World War I.

In 1918, he was appointed to the new chair of architecture (within the faculty of science) at the University of Sydney. Arriving later that year, he threw his energy into the creation of a faculty of architecture; succeeding in 1920, he became the first dean of the school that became known as the University of Sydney School of Architecture, Design and Planning.

Throughout his time in Australia, Wilkinson also continued to practise as an architect. He was appointed architect for the University of Sydney in 1919, where he contributed to the university's master plan (inspired by the Walter Burley Griffin's previous unused 1915 campus masterplan), as well as a number of building projects. He also designed over 30 commissions for houses and flats, and some church designs.

In 1933, he became president of the newly formed New South Wales state chapter of the Royal Australian Institute of Architects (RAIA), and in 1937 was a founding member of Robert Menzies' anti-modernist Australian Academy of Artists.

== Awards and recognition ==
- Royal Academy of Art Silver Medal, 1903
- Royal Academy of Art Gold Medal, 1905
- Sir John Sulman Medal, 1934 and 1942
- Inaugural Royal Australian Institute of Architects Gold Medal, 1960
- Honorary Award, University of Sydney, 1970

In 1961 the RAIA NSW Chapter created a new named annual architecture award, called the Wilkinson Award for residential architecture.

The Wilkinson Building, which houses the University of Sydney School of Architecture, Design and Planning, was named in his honour.

== Death and legacy ==
Wilkinson died on 20 September 1973 in the Sydney suburb of Vaucluse.

His ideals on architecture as a form of art had strongly influenced both the school and its students. The emphasis on the teaching of philosophy and practice of design was at the time a frontier in architecture education. Wilkinson was never a part of the modern architecture movement. His work, both as a teacher and practising architect, was consistently involved only with traditional architecture, which was inspired by Australian's colonial heritage and Mediterranean architecture. This reflected his training at the Royal Academy of Arts and his study tours in France, Italy, Spain and Great Britain. Wilkinson's influential work is seen in residential and church architecture, and the University of Sydney master plan.

== Notable projects ==
=== Academic ===
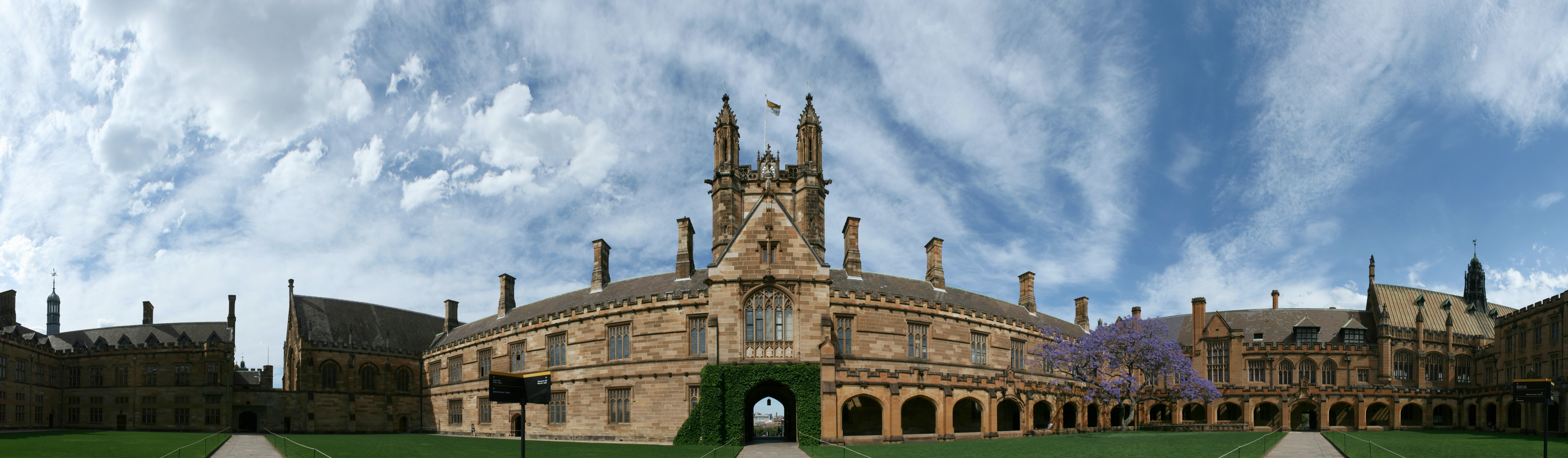
Sydney University Main Quadrangle Panorama by Toby Hudson

- Masterplan for the University of Sydney, 1920—1927
- Completion of Edmund Blacket's Gothic Revival Quadrangle, University of Sydney, 1919
- Chemistry Building, University of Sydney, 1923
- Physics Building, University of Sydney, 1926
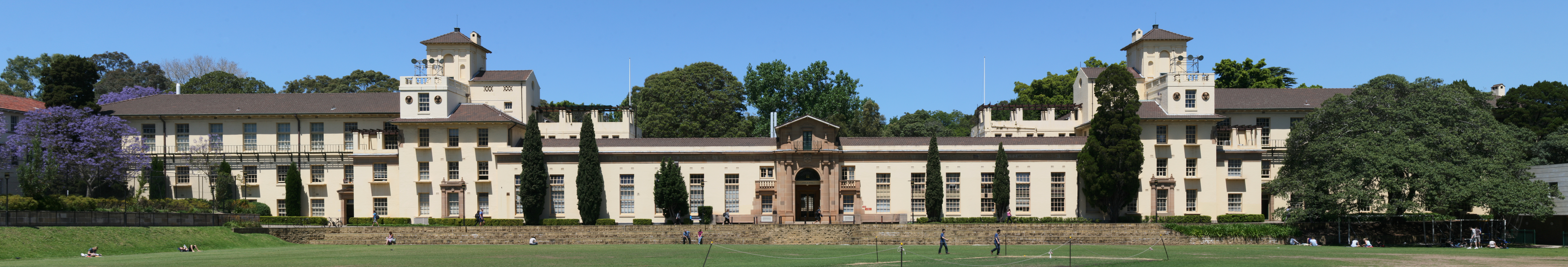
  Sydney University Physics Building by Toby Hudson

=== Residential ===
- Wilkinson Residence, Greenway, 1923
- Verona Residence, Double Bay, 1923
- Silchester, Bellevue Hill, 1930
- Greyleaves, Burradoo, 1934
- Samuel Hordern's Residence, Bellevue Hill, 1936
- Maiala, Warrawee, 1937
- Hazeldean, Cooma, 1937
- Markdale Homestead, Crookwell, 1951

=== Ecclesiastical ===
- St John's Church of England (now Anglican), Penshurst, Sydney
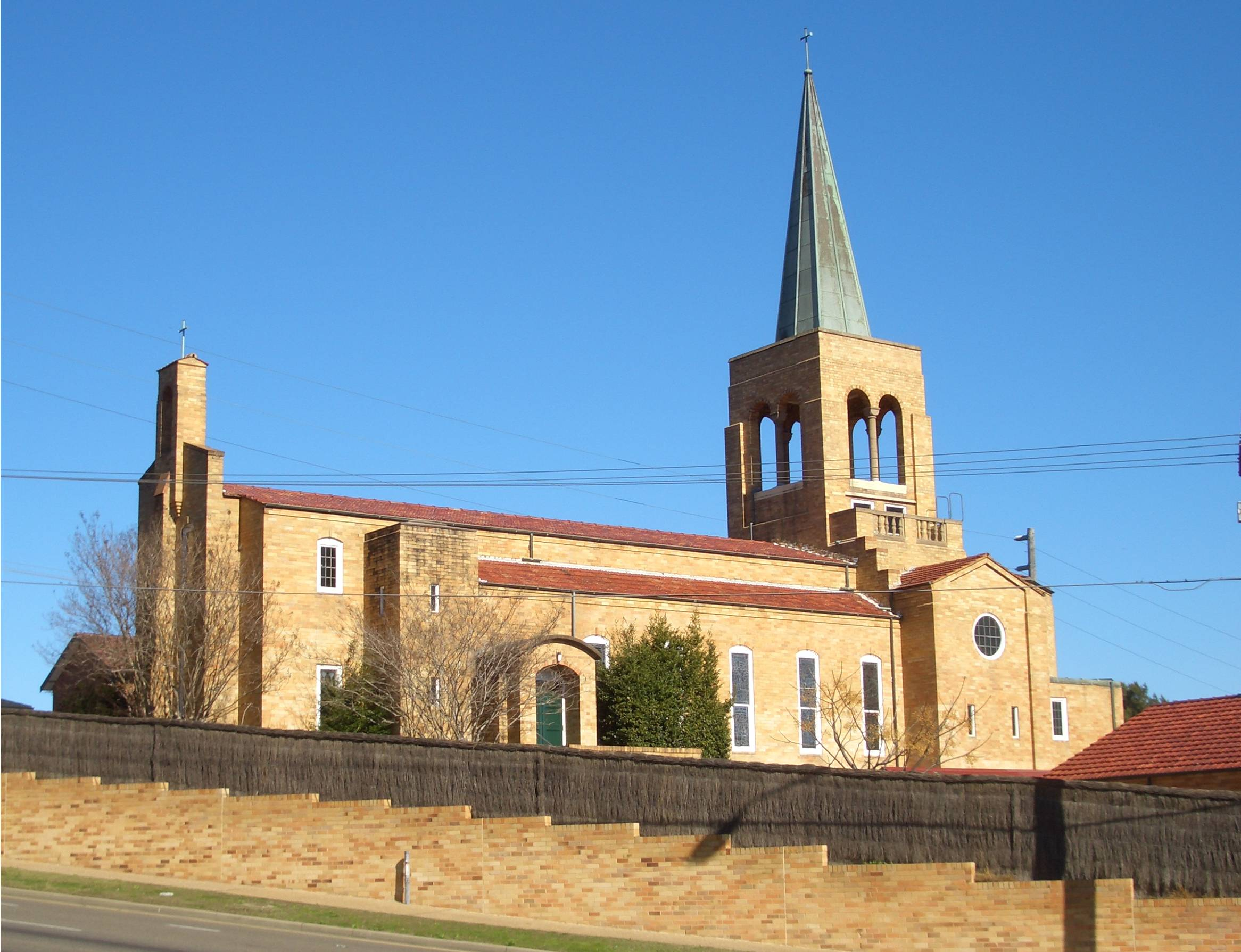
  St John's Church of England, Penshurst
- St John's Church of England (now Anglican), Maroubra, Sydney
- St Paul's Church, Harris Park, Sydney
- Completion of Blacket's St Michael's Anglican Church, Vaucluse
- Original design of Ss Peter and Paul Cathedral, Dogura, Papua New Guinea, 1932, which was much modified by a local lay worker, Robert Jones

== Publications ==
- Falkiner, Suzanne (1982). Leslie Wilkinson, A Practical Idealist. Sydney: Valadon Publishing. ISBN 0-9594202-1-5.

== See also ==
- Australian Institute of Architects Gold Medal
- University of Sydney
- University of Sydney School of Architecture, Design and Planning
- Wilkinson Award

Professional and academic associations
Preceded by Ernest Alfred Scott	President of the Royal Australian Institute of Architects (NSW Chapter); 1933–1934	Succeeded by Arthur William Anderson
Awards
Preceded by Budden & Mackey	Recipient of the Sir John Sulman Medal; 1934	Succeeded by Fowell & McConnel
Preceded by Stephenson and Turner	Recipient of the Sir John Sulman Medal; 1942	Succeeded by Fowell, McConnel & Mansfield
