= Celine Cairo =

Dutch singer-songwriter (born 1990)

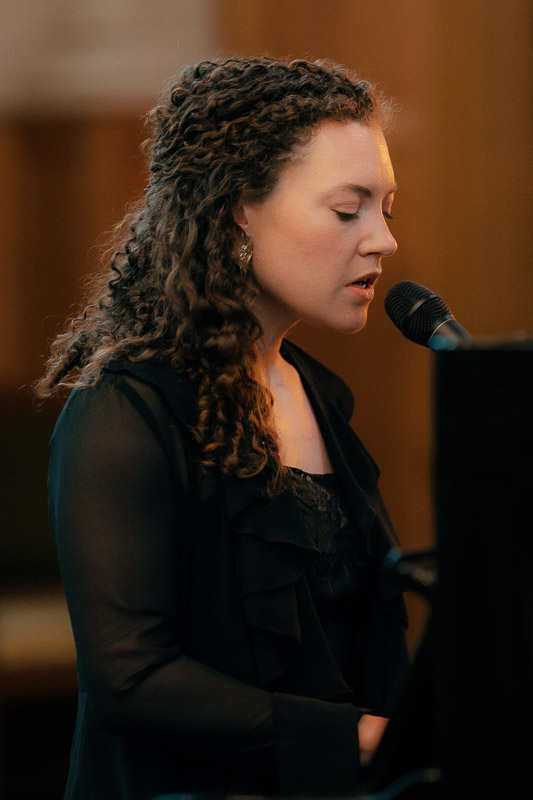
- Cairo performing in 2025

Background information
- Born: 22 May 1990 (age 36); Amsterdam, Netherlands
- Genres: Indie pop
- Occupation: Singer-songwriter
- Instruments: Vocals; guitar
- Years active: 2010–present
- Website: celinecairo.com

Celine Cairo (born 22 May 1990) is a Dutch singer-songwriter. As of 2023, she has released three EPs and five studio albums.

== Career ==
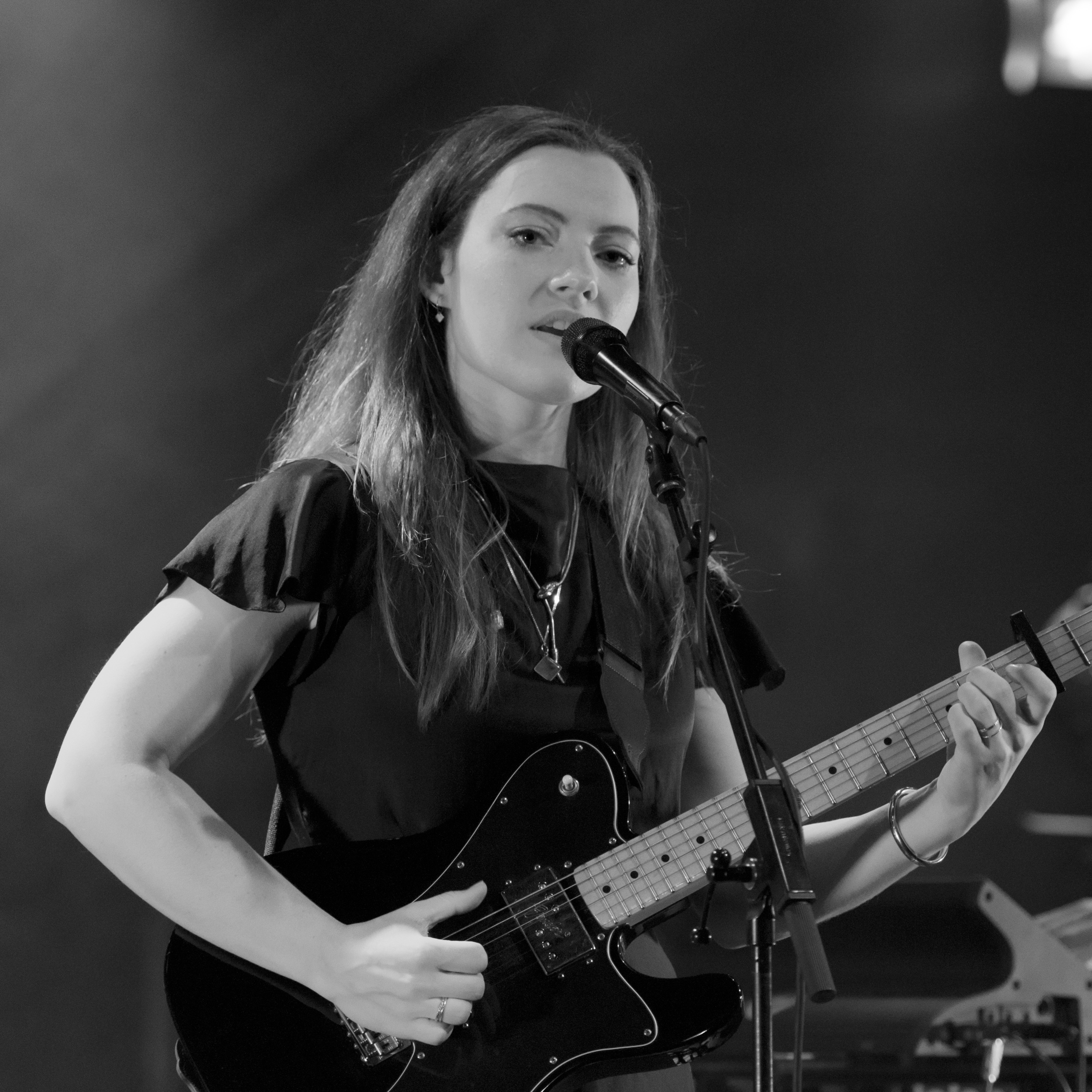
Cairo performing in 2017

Celine Cairo released her first, self-titled EP, in 2010. After meeting English musician Fink, she recorded her second EP, Follow, which he produced.

In the fall of 2015, Cairo travelled to New York and Los Angeles and started writing and co-writing songs for what was to become her debut album, Free Fall. She met producer and multi-instrumentalist Bill Lefler, who had previously worked with Laura Jansen, Ingrid Michaelson, Carey Brothers, and Dotan, and runs his own studio called Death Star Studio, in Koreatown, Los Angeles. recording for the album took place in early 2016, and it was released the same year.

In 2018, Cairo re-recorded all the songs from Free Fall in an acoustic setting at the Helmbreker studio in Haarlem, which resulted in The Hector Sessions album. In 2019, she issued the EP Siren Song and followed it in 2021 with the album Overflow. In 2026, she published the album Panacea.

== Discography ==
EPs

- Celine Cairo (2010)
- Follow (2013)
- Siren Song (2019)

Studio albums

- Free Fall (2016)
- Free Fall – 27 Tapes Session (2017)
- The Hector Sessions (2018)
- Overflow (2021)
- Panacea (2026)

Singles

- "Free Fall" (2016)
- "Hibernate" (2017)
- "Quicksand" (2017)
- "Method in the Madness" (2023)
