= List of Canada women's national rugby union team matches =

The following is a list of Canada women's national rugby union team international matches.

== Overall ==
Canada's overall international match record against all nations, updated to 23 October 2026, is as follows:

	Games Played	Won	Drawn	Lost	Percentage of wins
Total	191	101	5	85	52.88%

== Full internationals ==
Won	Lost	Draw

=== 1980s ===
Test	Date	Opponent	PF	PA	Venue	Event
1	14 November 1987	United States	22	3	Victoria, British Columbia	First international match outside Europe.
2	8 August 1988	United States	26	10	Saranac Lake	
3	3 September 1989	United States	28	3	Edmonton	

=== 1990s ===
Test	Date	Opponent	PF	PA	Venue	Event
4	1991-04-06	New Zealand	8	24	Glamorgan Wanderers	1991 RWC
5	1991-04-08	Wales	9	9	Glamorgan Wanderers	1991 RWC
6	1991-04-11	Soviet Union	38	0	Cardiff	1991 RWC
7	1991-04-12	Italy	6	0	Cardiff	1991 RWC
8	1991-04-13	Spain	19	4	Cardiff	1991 RWC
9	1992-09-13	United States	12	13	Blaine, Minnesota	
10	1993-06-08	Wales	22	8	Brampton, Ontario	1993 Canada Cup
11	1993-06-10	England	8	12	Ajax, Ontario	1993 Canada Cup
12	1993-06-12	United States	3	60	Markham, Ontario	1993 Canada Cup
13	1994-04-11	Wales	5	11	Edinburgh Academicals RFC	1994 RWC
14	1994-04-15	Kazakhstan	28	0	Edinburgh Academicals RFC	1994 RWC
15	1994-04-17	England	10	24	Gala	1994 RWC
16	1994-04-20	Japan	57	0	Melrose	1994 RWC
17	1994-04-23	Scotland	5	11	Boroughmuir	1994 RWC
18	1996-09-08	New Zealand	3	88	St. Albert	1996 Canada Cup
19	1996-09-11	France	34	3	Edmonton	1996 Canada Cup
20	1996-09-14	United States	14	22	Edmonton	1996 Canada Cup
21	1997-07-06	United States	12	21	Ajax, Ontario	
22	1998-05-01	Netherlands	16	7	Amsterdam	1998 RWC
23	1998-05-05	England	6	72	Amsterdam	1998 RWC
24	1998-05-09	France	9	7	Amsterdam	1998 RWC
25	1998-05-12	United States	6	46	Amsterdam	1998 RWC
26	1998-05-16	England	15	31	Amsterdam	1998 RWC
27	1999-08-08	United States	11	16	Saranac Lake, NY	
28	1999-10-13	United States	18	15	Palmerston North, New Zealand	Triangular '99
29	1999-10-16	New Zealand	0	73	Palmerston North, New Zealand	Triangular '99

=== 2000s ===
Test	Date	Opponent	PF	PA	Venue	Event
30	6 June 2000	United States	17	10	New York	
31	23 September 2000	New Zealand	0	41	Winnipeg	2000 Churchill Cup
32	27 September 2000	England	10	34	Winnipeg	2000 Churchill Cup
33	30 September 2000	United States	9	15	Winnipeg	2000 Churchill Cup
34	7 July 2001	United States	23	3	Twin Elm Rugby Park, Ottawa	
35	5 August 2001	United States	21	22	Saranac Lake, New York	
36	18 October 2001	Wales	21	7	Glamorgan Wanderers	
37	21 October 2001	Wales	12	11	Caerphilly	
38	28 October 2001	Wales	13	13	Ebbw Vale	
39	13 May 2002	Ireland	57	0	Barcelona	2002 RWC
40	18 May 2002	Scotland	11	0	Barcelona	2002 RWC
41	21 May 2002	England	10	53	Barcelona	2002 RWC
42	25 May 2002	France	7	41	Barcelona	2002 RWC
43	14 June 2003	England	5	10	Thunderbird Stadium, Vancouver	2003 Churchill Cup
44	20 June 2003	United States	18	13	Thunderbird Stadium, Vancouver	2003 Churchill Cup
45	28 June 2003	England	18	21	Thunderbird Stadium, Vancouver	2003 Churchill Cup
46	8 June 2004	New Zealand	5	32	Thunderbird Stadium, Vancouver	2004 Churchill Cup
47	13 June 2004	England	11	35	Calgary Rugby Park	2004 Churchill Cup
48	19 June 2004	United States	10	29	Edmonton	2004 Churchill Cup
49	14 November 2004	England	5	45	Richmond	
50	17 November 2004	England	3	41	Newbury	
51	2 July 2005	Scotland	22	9	Twin Elm Rugby Park, Ottawa	2005 Canada Cup
52	5 July 2005	New Zealand	3	43	Twin Elm Rugby Park, Ottawa	2005 Canada Cup
53	8 July 2005	New Zealand	5	32	Twin Elm Rugby Park, Ottawa	2005 Canada Cup
54	11 November 2005	France	5	13	Nantes	
55	11 November 2005	France	0	29	Nanterre	
56	29 April 2006	Ireland	8	15	Galway	
57	6 May 2006	Wales	11	16	Glamorgan Wanderers	
58	10 June 2006	United States	10	25	Boulder, Colorado	
59	13 June 2006	United States	20	18	Boulder, Colorado	
60	31 August 2006	New Zealand	7	66	Ellerslie Rugby Park, Edmonton	2006 RWC
61	4 September 2006	Spain	79	0	St. Albert Rugby Park, St. Albert	2006 RWC
62	8 September 2006	Kazakhstan	45	5	Ellerslie Rugby Park, Edmonton	2006 RWC
63	12 September 2006	England	6	10	Ellerslie Rugby Park, Edmonton	2006 RWC
64	17 September 2006	France	8	17	Commonwealth Stadium, Edmonton	2006 RWC
65	27 August 2007	United States	18	5	Blaine, Minnesota	
66	29 August 2007	United States	45	7	Blaine, Minnesota	
67	4 November 2007	Scotland	45	3	Glasgow	
68	9 November 2007	Wales	25	3	Cardiff	
69	24 August 2008	England	9	43	Esher, England	2008 Nations Cup
70	26 August 2008	United States	15	0	Esher, England	2008 Nations Cup
71	29 August 2008	England	0	24	Esher, England	
72	27 June 2009	United States	25	17	Infinity Park, Glendale, Colorado	
73	13 August 2009	South Africa	35	17	Oakville, Ontario	2009 Nations Cup
74	16 August 2009	France	7	12	Oakville, Ontario	2009 Nations Cup
75	19 August 2009	United States	10	15	Oakville, Ontario	2009 Nations Cup
76	22 August 2009	England	0	22	Fletcher's Fields, Toronto	2009 Nations Cup
77	18 November 2009	France	14	5	Dijon	
78	21 November 2009	France	0	22	Stade de France, Saint-Denis	

=== 2010s ===
Test	Date	Opponent	PF	PA	Venue	Event
79	12 January 2010	United States	18	8	Lakeland, Florida	
80	16 January 2010	United States	10	11	Lakeland, Florida	
81	14 June 2010	United States	14	8	Shawnigan Lake School	
82	18 June 2010	United States	34	22	Bear Mountain Stadium, Langford	
83	20 August 2010	Scotland	37	10	Surrey Sports Park, Guildford	2010 RWC
84	24 August 2010	Sweden	40	10	Surrey Sports Park, Guildford	2010 RWC
85	28 August 2010	France	8	23	Surrey Sports Park, Guildford	2010 RWC
86	1 September 2010	Scotland	41	0	Surrey Sports Park, Guildford	2010 RWC
87	5 September 2010	United States	20	23	Surrey Sports Park, Guildford	2010 RWC
88	2 August 2011	South Africa	52	17	Oakville, Ontario	Nations Cup
89	5 August 2011	United States	35	17	Chatham-Kent, Ontario	Nations Cup
90	9 August 2011	England	10	22	Oakville, Ontario	Nations Cup
91	13 August 2011	England	19	41	Oakville, Ontario	Nations Cup
92	30 July 2013	England	29	25	University of Northern Colorado	Nations Cup
93	4 August 2013	United States	17	29	University of Northern Colorado	Nations Cup
94	7 August 2013	South Africa	53	15	University of Northern Colorado	Nations Cup
95	10 August 2013	England	27	13	Infinity Park, Glendale, Colorado	Nations Cup
96	2 November 2013	France	19	27	Pontarlier, France	
97	5 November 2013	France	11	6	Amnéville, France	
98	13 November 2013	England	3	32	Twickenham Stoop, London, England	
99	15 April 2014	United States	51	7	Shawnigan Lake School, British Columbia	
100	19 April 2014	United States	14	10	Westhills Stadium, Langford, British Columbia	
101	6 June 2014	Australia	22	0	Tauranga, New Zealand	
102	10 June 2014	New Zealand	8	16	Tauranga, New Zealand	
103	14 June 2014	New Zealand	21	33	Whakatane, New Zealand	
104	1 August 2014	Spain	31	7	CNR, Marcoussis	2014 RWC
105	5 August 2014	Samoa	42	7	CNR, Marcoussis	2014 RWC
106	9 August 2014	England	13	13	CNR, Marcoussis	2014 RWC
107	13 August 2014	France	18	16	Stade Jean-Bouin, Paris, France	2014 RWC
108	17 August 2014	England	9	21	Stade Jean-Bouin, Paris, France	2014 RWC
109	27 June 2015	New Zealand	22	40	Calgary, Alberta	Super Series
110	1 July 2015	United States	28	36	Red Deer, Alberta	Super Series
111	5 July 2015	England	14	15	Ellerslie Rugby Park, Edmonton	Super Series
112	1 July 2016	England	52	17	Regional Athletic Complex, Salt Lake City, Utah	Super Series
113	5 July 2016	United States	33	5	Regional Athletic Complex, Salt Lake City, Utah	Super Series
114	9 July 2016	France	29	10	Regional Athletic Complex, Salt Lake City, Utah	Super Series
115	19 November 2016	Ireland	48	7	UCD Bowl, Dublin, Ireland	
116	23 November 2016	New Zealand	10	20	Donnybrook, Dublin, Ireland	
117	26 November 2016	England	6	39	Twickenham Stoop, London, England	
118	28 March 2017	United States	39	5	Chula Vista Elite Athlete Training Center, Chula Vista	
119	1 April 2017	United States	37	10	Chula Vista Elite Athlete Training Center, Chula Vista	
120	9 June 2017	New Zealand	16	28	Westpac Stadium, Wellington	
121	13 June 2017	England	20	27	Rugby Park, Christchurch	
122	17 June 2017	Australia	45	5	Smallbone Park, Rotorua	
123	9 August 2017	Hong Kong	98	0	Billings Park UCD, Dublin, Ireland	2017 RWC
124	13 August 2017	Wales	15	0	Billings Park UCD, Dublin, Ireland	2017 RWC
125	17 August 2017	New Zealand	5	48	Billings Park UCD, Dublin, Ireland	2017 RWC
126	22 August 2017	Wales	52	0	Queen's University Belfast, Northern Ireland	2017 RWC
127	26 August 2017	Australia	43	12	Queen's University Belfast, Northern Ireland	2017 RWC
128	17 November 2017	England	5	79	Barnet Copthall, London	
129	21 November 2017	England	12	49	Twickenham Stoop, London	
130	25 November 2017	England	19	69	Twickenham, London	
131	18 November 2018	England	19	27	Doncaster	
132	24 November 2018	Wales	38	21	Cardiff	
133	27 November 2018	Scotland	28	25	Scotstoun	
134	28 June 2019	New Zealand	20	35	Chula Vista, San Diego	Super Series
135	2 July 2019	France	36	19	Chula Vista, San Diego	Super Series
136	6 July 2019	England	17	19	Chula Vista, San Diego	Super Series
137	10 July 2019	United States	18	20	Chula Vista, San Diego	Super Series
138	20 November 2019	United States	19	0	Chula Vista, San Diego	
139	24 November 2019	United States	54	27	Chula Vista, San Diego	

=== 2021–24 ===
Test	Date	Opponent	PF	PA	Venue	Event
140	1 November 2021	United States	15	9	Infinity Park, Glendale	
141	5 November 2021	United States	26	13	Infinity Park, Glendale	
142	14 November 2021	England	12	51	Twickenham Stoop	
143	21 November 2021	Wales	24	7	Cardiff Arms Park	
144	6 June 2022	United States	36	5	Tauranga Domain	2022 PFS
145	12 June 2022	New Zealand	0	28	The Trusts Arena	2022 PFS
146	18 June 2022	Australia	22	10	Semenoff Stadium	2022 PFS
147	24 July 2022	Italy	34	24	Starlight Stadium	
148	27 August 2022	Wales	31	3	Wanderers Grounds	
149	23 September 2022	Fiji	24	7	HFC Bank Stadium	
150	9 October 2022	Japan	41	5	Northland Events Centre	2022 RWC
151	16 October 2022	Italy	22	12	Waitakere Stadium	2022 RWC
152	23 October 2022	United States	29	14	Waitakere Stadium	2022 RWC
153	30 October 2022	United States	32	11	Waitakere Stadium	2022 RWC
154	5 November 2022	England	19	26	Eden Park	2022 RWC
155	12 November 2022	France	0	36	Eden Park	2022 RWC
156	25 March 2023	South Africa	66	7	Estadio Nacional Complutense, Madrid, Spain	
157	1 April 2023	United States	50	17	Estadio Nacional Complutense, Madrid	2023 PFS
158	8 July 2023	New Zealand	21	52	TD Place Stadium, Ottawa	2023 PFS
159	14 July 2023	Australia	45	7	TD Place Stadium, Ottawa	2023 PFS
160	23 September 2023	England	24	50	Sandy Park, Exeter	
161	30 September 2023	England	12	29	Barnet Copthall, London	
162	21 October 2023	Wales	42	22	Wellington Regional Stadium, Wellington	2023 WXV 1
163	27 October 2023	England	12	45	Forsyth Barr Stadium, Dunedin	2023 WXV 1
164	4 November 2023	France	29	20	Mount Smart Stadium, Auckland	2023 WXV 1
165	28 April 2024	United States	50	7	Dignity Health Sports Park, Carson	2024 PFS
166	11 May 2024	Australia	33	14	Allianz Stadium, Sydney	2024 PFS
167	19 May 2024	New Zealand	22	19	Apollo Projects Stadium, Christchurch	2024 PFS
168	29 September 2024	France	46	24	BC Place, Vancouver	2024 WXV 1
169	5 October 2024	Ireland	21	8	Langley Events Centre, Langley	2024 WXV 1
170	12 October 2024	England	12	21	BC Place, Vancouver	2024 WXV 1

=== 2025 ===
Test	Date	Opponent	PF	PA	Venue	Event
171	2 May 2025	United States	26	14	CPKC Stadium, Kansas City	2025 PFS
172	16 May 2025	New Zealand	27	27	Apollo Projects Stadium, Christchurch	2025 PFS
173	23 May 2025	Australia	45	7	Suncorp Stadium, Brisbane	2025 PFS
174	5 July 2025	South Africa	50	20	Loftus Versfeld Stadium, Pretoria	2025 World Cup Warm-Ups
175	12 July 2025	South Africa	33	5	Nelson Mandela Bay Stadium, Gqeberha	2025 World Cup Warm-Ups
176	1 August 2025	United States	42	10	TD Place Stadium, Ottawa	2025 World Cup Warm-Ups
177	9 August 2025	Ireland	47	26	Kingspan Stadium, Belfast	2025 World Cup Warm-Ups
178	23 August 2025	Fiji	65	7	York Community Stadium, York	2025 World Cup
179	30 August 2025	Wales	42	0	Salford Community Stadium, Manchester	2025 World Cup
180	6 September 2025	Scotland	40	19	Sandy Park, Exeter	2025 World Cup
181	13 September 2025	Australia	46	5	Ashton Gate Stadium, Bristol	2025 World Cup
182	19 September 2025	New Zealand	34	19	Ashton Gate Stadium, Bristol	2025 World Cup
183	27 September 2025	England	13	33	Twickenham Stadium, London	2025 World Cup

=== 2026 ===
Test	Date	Opponent	PF	PA	Venue	Event
184	11 April 2026	Australia	24	0	Heart Health Park, Sacramento	2026 PFS
185	17 April 2026	New Zealand	14	36	CPKC Stadium, Kansas City	2026 PFS
186	24 April 2026	United States	50	12	SeatGeek Stadium, Bridgeview	2026 PFS
187	12 September 2026	Scotland	64	26	Scotland	2026 WXV
188	19 September 2026	England	26	26	Sandy Park, Exeter	2026 WXV
189	26 September 2026	France	5	21	Stade Marcel-Deflandre, La Rochelle	2026 WXV
190	16 October 2026	England	24	21	BMO Field, Toronto	2026 WXV
191	23 October 2026	England	31	22	TD Place Stadium, Ottawa	2026 WXV

== Other matches ==
Date	Canada	Score	Opponent	Venue	Event
2005-07-08	Canadian Barbarians	0–35	Scotland	Ottawa (?)	
2006-05-02	Canada	66–7	Wales A	UWIC, Cardiff	
2009-06-23	Canada Development	10–7	USA Development	Infinity Park, Glendale, Colorado	
2010-08-17	Canada U20	62–0	Cayman Islands	Nassau, Bahamas	2010 NACRA
2010-08-20	Canada U20	6–3	United States U20	Nassau, Bahamas	2010 NACRA
2023-07-08	Canada U20	24–40	United States U20	TD Place, Ottawa	
2023-07-13	Canada U20	12–39	Wales U20	Twin Elm Rugby Park, Ottawa	
2023-07-26	Canada U23	24–5	United States U23	Veterans Memorial Stadium	
2023-07-30	Canada U23	55–14	United States U23	Veterans Memorial Stadium	
2024-07-09	Canada Selects	27–12	Spain	Amorós Palao, Elche	
2024-06-15	Canada Selects	27–26	Spain	Campo del Pantano, Villajoyosa	
