= List of United States women's national rugby union team matches =

The following is a list of the United States women's national rugby union team international matches.

== Legend ==
Won	Lost	Draw

== 1987–1992 ==
Test	Date	Opponent	PF	PA	Venue	Event
1	1987-11-14	Canada	22	3	Victoria, British Columbia	First international outside Europe
2	1988-08-08	Canada	26	10	Saranac Lake	
3	1989-09-03	Canada	28	3	Edmonton	
4	1990-08-29	Netherlands	38	0	Christchurch	RugbyFest
5	1990-08-30	New Zealand	3	9	Christchurch	RugbyFest
6	1990-08-31	Soviet Union	32	0	Christchurch	RugbyFest
7	1991-04-06	Netherlands	7	0	Pontypool	1991 RWC
8	1991-04-10	Soviet Union	46	0	Glamorgan Wanderers	1991 RWC
9	1991-04-12	New Zealand	7	0	Cardiff Arms Park	1991 RWC
10	1991-04-14	England	19	6	Cardiff	1991 RWC
11	1992-09-13	Canada	13	12	Blaine, Minnesota	

== 1993–1994 ==
Test	Date	Opponent	PF	PA	Venue	Event
12	1993-06-08	England	6	17	Fletcher's Fields, Toronto	1993 CC
13	1993-06-10	Wales	26	0	Fletcher's Fields, Toronto	1993 CC
14	1993-06-12	Canada	60	3	Markham, Ontario	1993 CC
15	1994-04-11	Sweden	111	0	Melrose	1994 RWC
16	1994-04-15	Japan	121	0	Melrose	1994 RWC
17	1994-04-17	Ireland	76	0	Boroughmuir RFC	1994 RWC
18	1994-04-20	Wales	56	15	Gala RFC	1994 RWC
19	1994-04-24	England	23	38	Edinburgh Academicals RFC	1994 RWC

== 1996–1999 ==
Test	Date	Opponent	PF	PA	Venue	Event
20	1996-09-08	France	39	16	Edmonton	1996 CC
21	1996-09-11	New Zealand	8	88	Edmonton	1996 CC
22	1996-09-14	Canada	22	14	Edmonton	1996 CC
23	1997-07-06	Canada	21	12	Ajax, Ontario	
24	1997-08-02	Australia	28	24	Brisbane	
25	1998-05-02	Russia	84	0	Amsterdam	1998 RWC
26	1998-05-05	Spain	38	16	Amsterdam	1998 RWC
27	1998-05-09	Scotland	25	10	Amsterdam	1998 RWC
28	1998-05-12	Canada	46	6	Amsterdam	1998 RWC
29	1998-05-16	New Zealand	12	44	Amsterdam	1998 RWC
30	1999-08-08	Canada	16	11	Saranac Lake, New York	
31	1999-10-13	Canada	15	18	Palmerston North, NZ	T99
32	1999-10-19	New Zealand	5	65	Palmerston North, NZ	T99

== 2000-2002 ==
Test	Date	Opponent	PF	PA	Venue	Event	Ref
33	2000-06-06	Canada	10	17	New York		
34	2000-09-23	England	7	31	Winnipeg	2000 CC	
35	2000-09-27	New Zealand	0	45	Winnipeg	2000 CC	
36	2000-09-30	Canada	15	9	Winnipeg	2000 CC	
37	2001-07-07	Canada	3	23	Twin Elm Park, Ottawa		
38	2001-08-05	Canada	22	21	Saranac Lake, New York		
39	2001-11-18	Wales	20	17	Ebbw Vale		
40	2001-11-24	Scotland	3	22	Inverleith		
41	2002-05-13	Netherlands	87	0	Barcelona	2002 RWC	
42	2002-05-18	France	9	21	Barcelona	2002 RWC	
43	2002-05-21	Australia	5	17	Barcelona	2002 RWC	
44	2002-05-25	Spain	23	5	Barcelona	2002 RWC	

== 2003–2006 ==
Test	Date	Opponent	PF	PA	Venue	Event
45	2003-06-18	England	8	15	Thunderbird Stadium, Vancouver	2003 CC
46	2003-06-20	Canada	13	18	Thunderbird Stadium, Vancouver	2003 CC
47	2004-06-13	New Zealand	0	35	Calgary Rugby Park	2004 CC
48	2004-06-19	Canada	29	10	Edmonton	2004 CC
49	2004-11-27	Scotland	12	6	Murrayfield, Edinburgh	
50	2006-01-21	Scotland	13	6	Netherdale, Gala RFC	
51	2006-01-25	Ireland	23	5	Thomond Park, Munster Rugby	
52	2006-06-10	Canada	25	10	Boulder, Colorado	
53	2006-06-13	Canada	18	20	Boulder, Colorado	
54	2006-08-31	England	0	18	St. Albert Rugby Park, St. Albert	2006 RWC
55	2006-09-04	Ireland	24	11	Ellerslie Rugby Park, Edmonton	2006 RWC
56	2006-09-08	Australia	10	6	Ellerslie Rugby Park, Edmonton	2006 RWC
57	2006-09-12	Australia	29	12	St. Albert Rugby Park, St. Albert	2006 RWC
58	2006-09-17	Scotland	24	0	Commonwealth Stadium, Edmonton	2006 RWC

== 2007–2009 ==
Test	Date	Opponent	PF	PA	Venue	Event
59	2007-08-27	Canada	5	18	Blaine, Minnesota	
60	2007-08-29	Canada	7	45	Blaine, Minnesota	
61	2007-12-15	England	0	34	London Irish	
62	2008-08-19	England	3	50	Esher, England	
63	2008-08-22	England	14	17	Esher, England	2008 NC
64	2008-07-26	Canada	0	15	Esher, England	2008 NC
65	2009-06-27	Canada	17	25	Infinity Park, Glendale, Colorado	
66	2009-08-10	England	7	36	Oakville, Ontario	2009 NC
67	2009-08-16	South Africa	39	0	Oakville, Ontario	2009 NC
68	2009-08-19	Canada	15	10	Oakville, Ontario	2009 NC
69	2009-08-22	France	15	15	Fletcher's Fields, Toronto	2009 NC

== 2010 ==
Test	Date	Opponent	PF	PA	Venue	Event
70	2010-01-12	Canada	8	18	Lakeland, Florida	
71	2010-01-16	Canada	11	10	Lakeland, Florida	
72	2010-06-14	Canada	8	14	Shawnigan Lake School	
73	2010-06-18	Canada	22	34	Bear Mountain Stadium, Langford	
74	2010-08-20	Kazakhstan	51	0	Surrey Sports Park, Guildford	2010 RWC
75	2010-08-24	Ireland	12	22	Surrey Sports Park, Guildford	2010 RWC
76	2010-08-28	England	10	37	Surrey Sports Park, Guildford	2010 RWC
77	2010-09-01	Ireland	40	3	Surrey Sports Park, Guildford	2010 RWC
78	2010-09-05	Canada	23	20	Surrey Sports Park, Guildford	2010 RWC

== 2011–2012 ==
Test	Date	Opponent	PF	PA	Venue	Event
79	2011-08-02	England	11	15	Oakville, Ontario	2011 NC
80	2011-08-05	Canada	17	35	Chatham-Kent, Ontario	2011 NC
81	2011-08-09	South Africa	23	26	Oakville, Ontario	2011 NC
82	2011-08-13	South Africa	29	9	Oakville, Ontario	2011 NC
83	2012-11-18	Italy	34	20	Centro Sportivo di Roma	
84	2012-11-21	France	0	13	Stade Marcel Garcin, Orléans	
85	2012-11-24	France	3	27	Stade de France, Paris	

== 2013 ==
Test	Date	Opponent	PF	PA	Venue	Event
86	2013-06-07	France	13	10	Oxnard College	
87	2013-06-11	France	25	27	Oxnard College	
88	2013-06-14	France	12	18	StubHub Center, Carson, California	
89	2013-07-30	South Africa	32	22	University of Northern Colorado	2013 NC
90	2013-08-04	Canada	29	17	University of Northern Colorado	2013 NC
91	2013-08-07	England	21	36	University of Northern Colorado	2013 NC
92	2013-08-10	South Africa	61	5	Infinity Park, Glendale	2013 NC

== 2014 ==
Test	Date	Opponent	PF	PA	Venue	Event
93	2014-04-15	Canada	7	51	Shawnigan Lake School, British Columbia	
94	2014-04-19	Canada	10	14	Westhills, British Columbia	
95	2014-06-28	Wales	10	7	Wales	
96	2014-08-01	Ireland	17	23	CNR, Marcoussis Pitch 2	2014 RWC
97	2014-08-05	Kazakhstan	47	7	CNR, Marcoussis Pitch 2	2014 RWC
98	2014-08-09	New Zealand	3	34	CNR, Marcoussis Pitch 1	2014 RWC
99	2014-08-13	Australia	23	20	CNR, Marcoussis Pitch 1	2014 RWC
100	2014-08-17	New Zealand	5	55	CNR, Marcoussis Pitch 1	2014 RWC

== 2015–2016 ==
Test	Date	Opponent	PF	PA	Venue	Event
101	2015-06-27	England	13	39	Calgary, Alberta	2015 SS
102	2015-07-01	Canada	36	28	Red Deer, Alberta	2015 SS
103	2015-07-05	New Zealand	14	47	Ellerslie Park, Edmonton	2015 SS
104	2016-07-01	France	13	19	Salt Lake City, Utah	2016 SS
105	2016-07-05	Canada	5	33	Salt Lake City, Utah	2016 SS
106	2016-07-09	England	13	39	Salt Lake City, Utah	2016 SS
107	2016-11-22	France	10	36	Béziers	
108	2016-11-25	France	6	31	Montpellier	

== 2017 ==
Test	Date	Opponent	PF	PA	Venue	Event
109	2017-03-28	Canada	5	39	Chula Vista, California	
110	2017-04-01	Canada	10	37	Chula Vista, California	
111	2017-08-09	Italy	24	12	UCD Bowl, Dublin	2017 RWC
112	2017-08-13	Spain	43	0	UCD Bowl, Dublin	2017 RWC
113	2017-08-17	England	26	47	Billings Park UCD, Dublin	2017 RWC
114	2017-08-22	New Zealand	12	45	Ravenhill, Belfast	2017 RWC
115	2017-08-26	France	23	31	Ravenhill, Belfast	2017 RWC

== 2018–2019 ==
Test	Date	Opponent	PF	PA	Venue	Event
116	2018-11-03	New Zealand	6	67	Chicago	
117	2018-11-09	England	5	57	London	
118	2018-11-18	Ireland	19	10	Dublin	
119	2019-06-28	England	5	38	Chula Vista, California	2019 SS
120	2019-07-02	New Zealand	0	33	Chula Vista, California	2019 SS
121	2019-07-10	Canada	20	18	Chula Vista, California	2019 SS
122	2019-07-14	France	14	53	Chula Vista, California	2019 SS
123	2019-11-20	Canada	0	19	Chula Vista, California	
124	2019-11-24	Canada	27	54	Chula Vista, California	

== 2021 ==
Test	Date	Opponent	PF	PA	Venue	Event
125	2021-11-01	Canada	9	15	Glendale, Colorado	2021 PFS
126	2021-11-05	Canada	13	26	Glendale, Colorado	2021 PFS
127	2021-11-12	Ireland	10	20	RDS Arena, Dublin	
128	2021-11-21	England	0	89	Sixways Stadium, Worcester	

== 2022 ==
Test	Date	Opponent	PF	PA	Venue	Event
129	2022-06-06	Canada	5	36	Tauranga Domain	2022 PFS
130	2022-06-12	Australia	16	14	The Trusts Arena	2022 PFS
131	2022-06-16	New Zealand	6	50	Semenoff Stadium	2022 PFS
132	2022-08-27	Scotland	21	17	DAM Health Stadium	
133	2022-09-03	England	14	52	Sandy Park, Exeter	
134	2022-10-09	Italy	10	22	Northland Events Centre	2021 RWC
135	2022-10-15	Japan	30	17	Northland Events Centre	2021 RWC
136	2022-10-23	Canada	14	29	Waitakere Stadium	2021 RWC
137	2022-10-30	Canada	11	32	Waitakere Stadium	2021 RWC

== 2023 ==
Test	Date	Opponent	PF	PA	Venue	Event
138	2023-03-25	Spain	20	14	Estadio Nacional Complutense	
139	2023-04-01	Canada	17	50	Estadio Nacional Complutense	2023 PFS
140	2023-07-08	Australia	17	58	TD Place Stadium, Ottawa	2023 PFS
141	2023-07-14	New Zealand	17	39	TD Place Stadium, Ottawa	2023 PFS
142	2023-10-14	Samoa	36	26	Danie Craven Stadium, Stellenbosch	2023 WXV 2
143	2023-10-20	Scotland	14	24	Athlone Stadium, Cape Town	2023 WXV 2
144	2023-10-28	Italy	8	30	Athlone Stadium, Cape Town	2023 WXV 2

== 2024 ==
Test	Date	Opponent	PF	PA	Venue	Event
145	2024-03-30	South Africa	38	17	Trailfinders Sports Ground, London	
146	2024-04-27	Canada	7	50	Dignity Health Sports Park, Carson	2024 PFS
147	2024-05-11	New Zealand	5	57	FMG Stadium Waikato, Hamilton	2024 PFS
148	2024-05-17	Australia	32	25	AAMI Park, Melbourne	2024 PFS
149	2024-08-11	Japan	17	17	Mikuni World Stadium, Kitakyushu	
150	2024-08-17	Japan	11	8	Shizuoka Stadium ECOPA, Fukuroi	
151	2024-09-29	England	21	61	BC Place, Vancouver	2024 WXV 1
152	2024-10-05	France	14	22	Langley Events Centre, Langley	2024 WXV 1
153	2024-10-11	Ireland	14	26	BC Place, Vancouver	2024 WXV 1

== 2025 ==
Test	Date	Opponent	PF	PA	Venue	Event
154	April 27, 2025	Japan	33	39	Wallis Annenberg Stadium, LA	Test
155	May 3, 2025	Canada	14	26	CPKC Stadium, Kansas City	2025 PFS
156	May 17, 2025	Australia	19	27	GIO Stadium, Canberra	2025 PFS
157	May 24, 2025	New Zealand	14	79	North Harbour Stadium, Auckland	2025 PFS
158	July 19, 2025	Fiji	31	24	Audi Field, Washington, D.C.	2025 World Cup Warm-Ups
159	August 1, 2025	Canada	10	42	TD Place Stadium, Ottawa	2025 World Cup Warm-Ups
160	August 22, 2025	England	7	69	Stadium of Light, Sunderland	2025 World Cup
161	August 30, 2025	Australia	31	31	York Community Stadium, York	2025 World Cup
162	September 6, 2025	Samoa	60	0	York Community Stadium, York	2025 World Cup

== 2026 ==
Test	Date	Opponent	PF	PA	Venue	Event
163	April 12, 2026	New Zealand	15	48	Heart Health Park, Sacramento	2026 PFS
164	April 18, 2026	Australia	33	12	CPKC Stadium, Kansas City	2026 PFS
165	April 25, 2026	Canada	12	50	SeatGeek Stadium, Bridgeview	2026 PFS
166	July 4, 2026	South Africa	21	43	Ellis Park, Johannesburg	Test
167	July 11, 2026	South Africa	26	19	Loftus Versfeld, Pretoria	Test

== Other matches ==
Date	United States	Score	Opponent	Venue	Event	Ref
1997-08-04	USA Selects	24–19	Fiji	Suva		
2005-01-29	United States	21–8	England A	Imber Court		
2007-08-12	United States	0–24	Nomads	Clifton, New Jersey		
2009-06-23	USA Selects	7–10	Canada A	Infinity Park, Glendale, Colorado		
2010-08-15	USA U20	85–0	Cayman Islands	Nassau, Bahamas	NACRA	
2010-08-20	USA U20	3–6	Canada U20	Nassau, Bahamas	NACRA	
2023-06-03	USA U23	15–15	Brazil	Estádio Nicolau Alayon, São Paulo	2023 ART	
2023-06-07	USA U23	27–24	Colombia	Estádio Nogueirão, Mogi das Cruzes	2023 ART	
2024-06-11	USA Falcons	12–19	Brazil	São Paulo Athletic Club	2024 South America Tour	
2024-06-14	USA Falcons	12–21	Brazil	São Paulo Athletic Club	2024 South America Tour	
