= History of women's rugby union matches between Canada and New Zealand =

Canada and New Zealand have played 20 games against each other, with New Zealand winning 17, Canada winning 2 and a draw between the two sides. Their first match-up was at the inaugural 1991 Women's Rugby World Cup in Wales, with New Zealand winning (24–8) in their pool game. They met again at three other World Cup's in 2006, 2017 and 2025.

Canada and New Zealand have competed in several competitions other than the World Cup. In 1999, they competed at the Triangular '99 along with the United States. The Canada Cup which they both participated in between 1996 and 2005, and once for the Churchill Cup in 2004. Since 2022, they meet annually in the Pacific Four Series.

Canada created history when they defeated the Black Ferns for the first time (22–19) in the 2024 Pacific Four Series. The only draw between the two sides took place on 17 May in the 2025 Pacific Four Series. The Canadians recorded their second victory over New Zealand at the 2025 Women's Rugby World Cup with a (34–19) win in England when they beat them in the semi-finals.

== Summary ==
=== Overall ===
Details	Played	Won by Canada	Won by New Zealand	Drawn	Canada points	New Zealand points
In Canada	8	0	8	0	66	394
In New Zealand	7	1	5	1	94	224
Neutral venue	5	1	4	0	77	146
Overall	20	2	17	1	237	764

=== Record ===
Note: Date shown in brackets indicates when the record was or last set.

Record	Canada	New Zealand
Longest winning streak	1 (19 May 2024), (19 September 2025)	17 (6 Apr 1991-8 July 2023)
Largest points for
Home	22 (27 June 2015)	79 (16 October 1999)
Away	27 (17 May 2025)	88 (8 September 1996)
Neutral venue	34 (19 September 2025)	48 (17 August 2017)
Largest winning margin
Home	NA	79 (16 October 1999)
Away	3 (19 May 2024)	85 (8 September 1996)
Neutral venue	15 (19 September 2025)	43 (17 August 2017)

== Results ==
No.	Date	Venue	Score	Winner	Competition
1	16 April 1991	Glamorgan Warriors, Cardiff, Wales	24–8	New Zealand	1991 Women's Rugby World Cup
2	8 September 1996	Edmonton	3–88	New Zealand	1996 Canada Cup
3	16 October 1999	Palmerston North	73–0	New Zealand	Triangular '99
4	23 September 2000	Winnipeg	0–41	New Zealand	2000 Canada Cup
5	8 June 2004	Thunderbird Stadium, Vancouver	5–32	New Zealand	2004 Women's Churchill Cup warm-up
6	5 June 2005	Ottawa	3–43	New Zealand	2005 Canada Cup
7	8 June 2005	Ottawa	5–32	New Zealand	2005 Canada Cup Final
8	31 August 2006	Ellerslie Rugby Park, Edmonton	66–7	New Zealand	2006 Women's Rugby World Cup
9	10 June 2014	Tauranga	16–8	New Zealand	2014 Women's Rugby World Cup warm-up
10	16 June 2014	Whakatāne	33–21	New Zealand	2014 Women's Rugby World Cup warm-up
11	27 June 2015	Calgary Rugby Park, Calgary	22–40	New Zealand	2015 Women's Rugby Super Series
12	23 November 2016	Donnybrook Stadium, Dublin, Ireland	10–20	New Zealand	2016 Autumn International
13	9 June 2017	Westpac Stadium, Wellington	28–16	New Zealand	2017 Women's Rugby World Cup warm-up
14	17 August 2017	Billings Park UCD, Dublin, Ireland	5–48	New Zealand	2017 Women's Rugby World Cup
15	28 June 2019	Chula Vista, San Diego, United States	20–35	New Zealand	2019 Women's Rugby Super Series
16	12 June 2022	The Trusts Arena, Auckland	28–0	New Zealand	2022 Pacific Four Series
17	8 July 2023	TD Place Stadium, Ottawa	21–52	New Zealand	2023 Pacific Four Series
18	19 May 2024	Apollo Projects Stadium, Christchurch	19–22	Canada	2024 Pacific Four Series
19	17 May 2025	Apollo Projects Stadium, Christchurch	27–27	Draw	2025 Pacific Four Series
20	19 September 2025	Ashton Gate Stadium, Bristol	34–19	Canada	2025 Rugby World Cup
