= List of New Zealand women's national rugby union team matches =

A list of all international Test Matches played by the Black Ferns.

== Overall ==
New Zealand's overall Test Match record against all nations, updated to 31 October 2026, is as follows:

	Games played	Won	Lost	Drawn	Win Percentage
Total	158	132	25	2	83.54%

== Legend ==
Won	Lost	Draw

== 1990s ==
=== 1991–1995 ===
Test	Date	Opponent	PF	PA	Venue	Event	Ref
1	6 April 1991	Canada	24	8	Glamorgan Wanderers	1991 Rugby World Cup	
2	10 April 1991	Wales	24	6	Llanharan	1991 Rugby World Cup	
3	12 April 1991	United States	0	7	Cardiff Arms Park	1991 Rugby World Cup	
4	2 September 1994	Australia	37	0	Sydney		
5	22 July 1995	Australia	64	0	Auckland	Test	

=== 1996–1997 ===
Test	Date	Opponent	PF	PA	Venue	Event	Ref
6	31 August 1996	Australia	28	5	Sydney	Test	
7	8 September 1996	Canada	88	3	Edmonton	Canada Cup	
8	11 September 1996	United States	88	8	Edmonton	Canada Cup	
9	14 September 1996	France	109	0	Edmonton	Canada Cup	
10	13 August 1997	England	67	0	Burnham, NZ	Test	
11	16 August 1997	Australia	44	0	Dunedin	Test	

=== 1998–1999 ===
Test	Date	Opponent	PF	PA	Venue	Event	Ref
12	2 May 1998	Germany	134	6	Amsterdam	1998 Rugby World Cup	
13	5 May 1998	Scotland	76	0	Amsterdam	1998 Rugby World Cup	
14	9 May 1998	Spain	46	3	Amsterdam	1998 Rugby World Cup	
15	12 May 1998	England	44	11	Amsterdam	1998 Rugby World Cup	
16	16 May 1998	United States	44	12	Amsterdam	1998 Rugby World Cup	
17	29 August 1998	Australia	27	3	Sydney	Test	
18	16 October 1999	Canada	73	0	Palmerston North, NZ	Triangular '99	
19	19 October 1999	United States	65	5	Palmerston North, NZ	Triangular '99	

== 2000s ==
=== 2000–2001 ===
Test	Date	Opponent	PF	PA	Venue	Event	Ref
20	23 September 2000	Canada	41	0	Winnipeg	Canada Cup	
21	27 September 2000	United States	45	0	Winnipeg	Canada Cup	
22	30 September 2000	England	32	13	Winnipeg	Canada Cup	
23	9 June 2001	England	15	10	Rotorua	Test	
24	16 June 2001	England	17	22	North Harbour Stadium, Albany	Test	

=== 2002–2003 ===
Test	Date	Opponent	PF	PA	Venue	Event	Ref
25	13 May 2002	Germany	117	0	Barcelona	2002 RWC	
26	18 May 2002	Australia	36	3	Barcelona	2002 RWC	
27	21 May 2002	France	30	0	Barcelona	2002 RWC	
28	25 May 2002	England	19	9	Barcelona	2002 RWC	
29	4 October 2003	World XV	37	0	Auckland		
30	11 October 2003	World XV	38	19	Whangārei		

=== 2004–2005 ===
Test	Date	Opponent	PF	PA	Venue	Event	Ref
31	8 June 2004	Canada	32	5	Thunderbird Stadium, Vancouver	2004 Churchill Cup	
32	13 June 2004	United States	35	0	Calgary Rugby Park	2004 Churchill Cup	
33	19 June 2004	England	38	0	Commonwealth Stadium, Edmonton	2004 Churchill Cup	
34	29 June 2005	Scotland	30	9	Ottawa	2005 Canada Cup	
35	5 July 2005	Canada	43	3	Ottawa	2005 Canada Cup	
36	8 July 2005	Canada	32	5	Ottawa	2005 Canada Cup	
37	22 October 2005	England	24	15	Eden Park, Auckland	Test	
38	26 October 2005	England	33	8	Waikato Stadium, Hamilton	Test	

=== 2006–2007 ===
Test	Date	Opponent	PF	PA	Venue	Event	Ref
39	31 August 2006	Canada	66	7	Ellerslie Rugby Park, Edmonton	2006 RWC	
40	4 September 2006	Samoa	50	0	St. Albert Rugby Park, St. Albert	2006 RWC	
41	8 September 2006	Scotland	21	0	Ellerslie Rugby Park, Edmonton	2006 RWC	
42	12 September 2006	France	40	10	Ellerslie Rugby Park, Edmonton	2006 RWC	
43	17 September 2006	England	25	17	The Brick Field, Edmonton	2006 RWC	
44	16 October 2007	Australia	21	10	Cooks Gardens, Wanganui	Test	
45	20 October 2007	Australia	29	12	Wellington	Test	

=== 2008–2009 ===
Test	Date	Opponent	PF	PA	Venue	Event	Ref
46	22 July 2008	Australia	37	3	Canberra	Test	
47	26 July 2008	Australia	22	16	Sydney	Test	
48	14 November 2009	England	16	3	Esher	Test	
49	21 November 2009	England	3	10	Twickenham Stadium	Test	

== 2010s ==
=== 2010 ===
Test	Date	Opponent	PF	PA	Venue	Event	Ref
50	20 August 2010	South Africa	55	3	Surrey Sports Park, Guildford	2010 Rugby World Cup	
51	24 August 2010	Australia	32	5	Surrey Sports Park, Guildford	2010 Rugby World Cup	
52	28 August 2010	Wales	41	8	Surrey Sports Park, Guildford	2010 Rugby World Cup	
53	1 September 2010	France	45	7	Stoop	2010 Rugby World Cup	
54	5 September 2010	England	13	10	Twickenham Stoop	2010 Rugby World Cup	

=== 2011–2013 ===
Test	Date	Opponent	PF	PA	Venue	Event	Ref
55	26 November 2011	England	0	10	Twickenham, London	End-of-year Tour	
56	29 November 2011	England	7	21	Molesey Road, Esher	End-of-year Tour	
57	3 December 2011	England	8	8	Molesey Road, Esher	End-of-year Tour	
58	23 November 2012	England	13	16	Molesey Road, Esher	End-of-year Tour	
59	27 November 2012	England	8	17	Aldershot Military Stadium	End-of-year Tour	
60	1 December 2012	England	23	32	Twickenham	End-of-year Tour	
61	13 July 2013	England	29	10	Eden Park	England's NZ Tour	
62	16 July 2013	England	14	9	Waikato Stadium, Hamilton	England's NZ Tour	
63	20 July 2013	England	29	8	ECOlight Stadium, Pukekohe	England's NZ Tour	

=== 2014 ===
Test	Date	Opponent	PF	PA	Venue	Event	Ref
64	1 June 2014	Australia	38	3	Rotorua International Stadium		
65	7 June 2014	Samoa	90	12	Eden Park		
66	10 June 2014	Canada	16	8	Tauranga		
67	14 June 2014	Canada	33	21	Whakatāne		
68	1 August 2014	Kazakhstan	79	5	CNR, Marcoussis Pitch 2	2014 Rugby World Cup	
69	5 August 2014	Ireland	14	17	CNR, Marcoussis Pitch 1	2014 Rugby World Cup	
70	9 August 2014	United States	34	3	CNR, Marcoussis Pitch 1	2014 Rugby World Cup	
71	13 August 2014	Wales	63	7	CNR, Marcoussis Pitch 1	2014 Rugby World Cup	
72	17 August 2014	United States	55	5	CNR, Marcoussis Pitch 1	2014 Rugby World Cup	

=== 2015–2016 ===
Test	Date	Opponent	PF	PA	Venue	Event	Ref
73	27 June 2015	Canada	40	22	Calgary	2015 Super Series	
74	1 July 2015	England	26	7	Calgary	2015 Super Series	
75	5 July 2015	United States	47	14	Ellerslie Rugby Park, Edmonton	2015 Super Series	
76	22 October 2016	Australia	67	3	Eden Park	2016 Laurie O'Reilly Cup	
77	26 October 2016	Australia	29	3	QBE Stadium, North Shore	2016 Laurie O'Reilly Cup	
78	19 November 2016	England	25	20	Twickenham Stoop		
79	23 November 2016	Canada	20	10	Donnybrook, Dublin		
80	27 November 2016	Ireland	38	8	UCD Bowl, Dublin, Ireland		

=== 2017 ===
Test	Date	Opponent	PF	PA	Venue	Event	Ref
81	9 June 2017	Canada	28	16	Westpac Stadium, Wellington		
82	13 June 2017	Australia	44	17	Rugby Park, Christchurch	2017 Laurie O'Reilly Cup	
83	17 June 2017	England	21	29	Rotorua International Stadium		
84	9 August 2017	Wales	44	12	Billings Park UCD, Dublin	2017 Rugby World Cup	
85	13 August 2017	Hong Kong	121	0	Billings Park UCD, Dublin	2017 Rugby World Cup	
86	17 August 2017	Canada	48	5	Billings Park UCD, Dublin	2017 Rugby World Cup	
87	22 August 2017	United States	45	12	Ravenhill Stadium, Belfast	2017 Rugby World Cup	
88	26 August 2017	England	41	32	Ravenhill Stadium, Belfast	2017 Rugby World Cup	

=== 2018–2019 ===
Test	Date	Opponent	PF	PA	Venue	Event	Ref
89	18 August 2018	Australia	31	11	ANZ Stadium	2018 Laurie O'Reilly Cup	
90	25 August 2018	Australia	45	17	Eden Park	2018 Laurie O'Reilly Cup	
91	3 November 2018	United States	67	6	Soldier Field, Chicago		
92	9 November 2018	France	14	0	Stade Mayol, Toulon		
93	17 November 2018	France	27	30	Stade des Alpes, Grenoble		
94	29 June 2019	Canada	35	20	Chula Vista, San Diego	2019 Super Series	
95	3 July 2019	United States	33	0	Chula Vista, San Diego	2019 Super Series	
96	6 July 2019	France	16	25	Chula Vista, San Diego	2019 Super Series	
97	14 July 2019	England	28	13	Chula Vista, San Diego	2019 Super Series	
98	10 August 2019	Australia	47	10	Optus Stadium, Perth	2019 Laurie O'Reilly Cup	
99	17 August 2019	Australia	37	8	Eden Park	2019 Laurie O'Reilly Cup	

== 2020s ==
=== 2021 ===
Test	Date	Opponent	PF	PA	Venue	Event	Ref
100	31 October 2021	England	12	43	Sandy Park, Exeter	Autumn Int.	
101	7 November 2021	England	15	56	Franklin's Gardens	Autumn Int.	
102	13 November 2021	France	13	38	Stade du Hameau, Pau	Autumn Int.	
103	20 November 2021	France	7	29	Stade Pierre-Fabre, Castres	Autumn Int.	

=== 2022 ===
Test	Date	Opponent	PF	PA	Venue	Event	Ref
104	6 June 2022	Australia	23	10	Tauranga Domain, Tauranga	2022 P4S	
105	12 June 2022	Canada	28	0	The Trusts Arena, West Auckland	2022 P4S	
106	18 June 2022	United States	50	6	Semenoff Stadium, Whangārei	2022 P4S	
107	20 August 2022	Australia	52	5	Orangetheory Stadium	2022 O'Reilly Cup	
108	27 August 2022	Australia	22	14	Adelaide Oval	2022 O'Reilly Cup	
109	24 September 2022	Japan	95	12	Eden Park, Auckland	Warm-up match	
110	8 October 2022	Australia	41	17	Eden Park, Auckland	2021 RWC	
111	16 October 2022	Wales	56	12	The Trusts Arena	2021 RWC	
112	22 October 2022	Scotland	57	0	Northland Events Centre	2021 RWC	
113	29 October 2022	Wales	55	3	Northland Events Centre	2021 RWC Quarters	
114	5 November 2022	France	25	24	Eden Park, Auckland	2021 RWC Semi-final	
115	12 November 2022	England	34	31	Eden Park, Auckland	2021 RWC Final	

=== 2023 ===
Test	Date	Opponent	PF	PA	Venue	Event	Ref
116	29 June 2023	Australia	50	0	Kayo Stadium, Brisbane	2023 P4S/O'Reilly Cup	
117	8 July 2023	Canada	52	21	TD Place Stadium, Ottawa	2023 P4S	
118	14 July 2023	United States	39	17	TD Place Stadium, Ottawa	2023 P4S	
119	30 September 2023	Australia	43	3	FMG Stadium, Waikato	2023 O'Reilly Cup	
120	21 October 2023	France	17	18	Sky Stadium, Wellington	WXV 2023	
121	28 October 2023	Wales	70	7	Forsyth Barr Stadium, Dunedin	WXV 2023	
122	4 November 2023	England	12	33	Go Media Stadium Mt Smart	WXV 2023	

=== 2024 ===
Test	Date	Opponent	PF	PA	Venue	Event	Ref
123	11 May 2024	United States	57	5	FMG Stadium Waikato, Hamilton	2024 PFS	
124	19 May 2024	Canada	19	22	Apollo Projects Stadium	2024 PFS	
125	25 May 2024	Australia	67	19	North Harbour Stadium, Albany	2024 PFS/O'Reilly Cup	
126	14 July 2024	Australia	62	0	Ballymore Stadium, Brisbane	2024 O'Reilly Cup	
127	14 September 2024	England	12	24	Twickenham Stadium, London		
128	29 September 2024	Ireland	27	29	BC Place, Vancouver	2024 WXV	
129	5 October 2024	England	31	49	Langley Events Centre, Langley	2024 WXV	
130	12 October 2024	France	39	14	BC Place, Vancouver	2024 WXV	

=== 2025 ===
Test	Date	Opponent	PF	PA	Venue	Event
131	10 May 2025	Australia	38	12	McDonald Jones Stadium	2025 PFS
132	17 May 2025	Canada	27	27	Apollo Projects Stadium	2025 PFS
133	24 May 2025	United States	79	14	North Harbour Stadium, Albany	2025 PFS
134	12 July 2025	Australia	37	12	Sky Stadium, Wellington	2025 O'Reilly Cup
135	24 August 2025	Spain	54	8	York Community Stadium, York	2025 World Cup
136	31 August 2025	Japan	62	19	Sandy Park, Exeter	2025 World Cup
137	7 September 2025	Ireland	40	0	Brighton and Hove Albion Stadium, Brighton	2025 World Cup
138	13 September 2025	South Africa	46	17	Sandy Park, Exeter	2025 World Cup
139	19 September 2025	Canada	19	34	Ashton Gate, Bristol	2025 World Cup
140	27 September 2025	France	42	26	Twickenham Stadium, London	2025 World Cup

=== 2026 ===
Test	Date	Opponent	PF	PA	Venue	Event
141	12 April 2026	United States	48	15	Heart Health Park, Sacramento	2026 Pacific Four Series
142	18 April 2026	Canada	36	14	CPKC Stadium, Kansas City	2026 Pacific Four Series
143	25 April 2026	Australia	40	5	Sunshine Coast Stadium, Kawana Waters	2026 Pacific Four Series
144	22 August 2026	Australia	66	19	Mount Smart Stadium, Auckland	2026 Laurie O'Reilly Cup
145	5 September 2026	South Africa	52	20	FNB Stadium, Johannesburg	Test
146	12 September 2026	France	28	14	Stade de Gerland, Lyon	2026 WXV Global Series
147	19 September 2026	Scotland	66	14	Edinburgh Rugby Stadium, Edinburgh	2026 WXV Global Series
148	26 September 2026	England	19	26	Twickenham Stadium, London	2026 WXV Global Series
149	17 October 2026	France	81	12	Waikato Stadium, Hamilton	Black Ferns Home Series (2026 WXV)
150	24 October 2026	France	31	12	Okara Park, Whangārei	Black Ferns Home Series (2026 WXV)
151	31 October 2026	France	36	7	Te Kaha, Christchurch	Black Ferns Home Series (2026 WXV)

=== 2027 ===
Test	Date	Opponent	PF	PA	Venue	Event
	11 September 2027	British & Irish Lions	TBD	TBD	Mount Smart Stadium, Auckland	2027 British & Irish Lions Women's tour to New Zealand
	18 September 2027	British & Irish Lions	TBD	TBD	Wellington Regional Stadium, Wellington	2027 British & Irish Lions Women's tour to New Zealand
	25 September 2027	British & Irish Lions	TBD	TBD	Te Kaha, Christchurch	2027 British & Irish Lions Women's tour to New Zealand

== Other matches ==
Date	New Zealand	Score	Opponent	Venue	Event	Ref
22 July 1989	New Zealand	13–7	(United States) California Grizzlies	Lancaster Park	First Black Ferns Game	
26 August 1990	New Zealand	56–0	Netherlands	Christchurch	RugbyFest 1990	
28 August 1990	New Zealand	8–0	Soviet Union	Christchurch	RugbyFest 1990	
30 August 1990	New Zealand	9–3	United States	Christchurch	RugbyFest 1990	
1 September 1990	New Zealand	12–4	World XV	Christchurch	RugbyFest 1990	
13 April 1991	New Zealand XV	0–3	France	Cardiff		
19 October 2005	New Zealand Select	8–40	England Select	North Harbour Stadium		
17 November 2009	New Zealand	48–3	England A	Esher		
18 November 2019	Black Ferns Dev. XV	53–0	Fiji	Churchill Park, Lautoka	Oceania Championship	
22 November 2019	Black Ferns Dev. XV	50–0	Australia A	Churchill Park, Lautoka	Oceania Championship	
26 November 2019	Black Ferns Dev. XV	131–0	Papua New Guinea	Churchill Park, Lautoka	Oceania Championship	
14 November 2020	New Zealand	34–15	(New Zealand) NZ Barbarians	The Trusts Arena		
21 November 2020	New Zealand	19–17	(New Zealand) NZ Barbarians	Trafalgar Park		
5 July 2025	New Zealand	45–12	(New Zealand) Black Ferns XV	Semenoff Stadium		
