= History of women's rugby union matches between New Zealand and the United States =

New Zealand and the United States clashed for the first time officially at the inaugural 1991 Rugby World Cup in Wales. Although there was an earlier encounter at RugbyFest 1990, only the USA considers this match to be an official test whereas New Zealand lists the match as an unofficial "New Zealand XV" fixture. Excluding the 1990 encounter, they have faced each other 16 times with New Zealand winning 15, and the USA winning once. The Eagles handed the Black Ferns their first defeat in the semi-final, winning 7–0. They also faced each other in three separate World Cups in 1998, 2014 and 2017. At the 2014 World Cup they met twice, in the pool stages and in the fifth-place playoff.

The Eagles hosted the Black Ferns for the first time at Soldier Field in Chicago, as part of a Rugby Weekend triple header. The United States were trounced 6–67 by the Black Ferns. They met at the 2022 Pacific Four Series in New Zealand where the Black Ferns clinched their first series title after beating the Eagles (50–6) in the final match.

The Black Ferns extended their winning streak to 16 after defeating the Eagles at the 2026 Pacific Four Series in the United States.

== Summary ==
=== Overall ===
Details	Played	Won by New Zealand	Won by United States	Drawn	New Zealand points	United States points
In New Zealand	4	4	0	0	251	30
In the United States	3	3	0	0	100	6
Neutral venue	10	9	1	0	430	78
Overall	17	16	1	0	829	129

=== Record ===
Note: Date shown in brackets indicates when the record was or last set.

Record	New Zealand	United States
Longest winning streak	16 (11 Sep 1996–Present)	1 (12 Apr 1991–11 Sep 1996)
Largest points for
Home	79 (24 May 2025)	6 (3 November 2018)
Away	67 (3 November 2018)	14 (24 May 2025)
Neutral venue	88 (11 September 1996)	14 (5 July 2015)
Largest winning margin
Home	65 (24 May 2025)	NA
Away	61 (3 November 2018)	NA
Neutral venue	80 (11 September 1996)	7 (12 April 1991)

== Results ==
No.	Date	Venue	Score	Winner	Competition
1	12 April 1991	Cardiff Arms Park, Cardiff, Wales	0 – 7	United States	1991 Women's Rugby World Cup Semi-Final
2	11 September 1996	Edmonton, Canada	86 – 8	New Zealand	1996 Canada Cup
3	16 May 1998	Amsterdam, Netherlands	44 – 12	New Zealand	1998 Women's Rugby World Cup Final
4	19 October 1999	Palmerston North	65 – 5	New Zealand	Triangular '99
5	27 September 2000	Winnipeg, Canada	45 – 0	New Zealand	2000 Canada Cup
6	13 June 2004	Edmonton, Canada	35 – 0	New Zealand	2004 Women's Churchill Cup
7	5 August 2014	CNR, Marcoussis, France	34 – 3	New Zealand	2014 Women's Rugby World Cup
8	17 August 2014	Stade Jean-Bouin, Paris, France	5 – 55	New Zealand	2014 Women's Rugby World Cup Play-Off for 5th Place
9	5 July 2015	Ellerslie Rugby Park, Edmonton, Canada	47 – 14	New Zealand	2015 Women's Rugby Super Series
10	22 August 2017	Kingspan Stadium, Belfast, Ireland	45 – 12	New Zealand	2017 Women's Rugby World Cup Semi-Final
11	3 November 2018	Soldier Field, Chicago	6 – 67	New Zealand	2018 Autumn International
12	2 July 2019	Chula Vista, San Diego	33 – 0	New Zealand	2019 Women's Rugby Super Series
13	18 June 2022	Semenoff Stadium, Whangārei	50 – 6	New Zealand	2022 Pacific Four Series
14	14 July 2023	TD Place Stadium, Ottawa, Canada	39 – 17	New Zealand	2023 Pacific Four Series
15	11 May 2024	Waikato Stadium, Hamilton	57 – 5	New Zealand	2024 Pacific Four Series
16	24 May 2025	North Harbour Stadium, Albany	79 – 14	New Zealand	2025 Pacific Four Series
17	11 April 2026	Heart Health Park, Sacramento	15 – 48	New Zealand	2026 Pacific Four Series
