= History of women's rugby union matches between England and the United States =

England women and USA women first competed against each other in the final of the inaugural Women's Rugby World Cup in 1991. It was the only match won by the United States, and all of the games since, including the 1994 World Cup final, have been won by England.

== Summary ==
=== Overall ===
Details	Played	Won by England	Won by United States	Drawn	England points	United States points
In England	8	8	0	0	395	53
In the United States	3	3	0	0	113	39
Neutral venue	11	10	1	0	323	141
Overall	22	21	1	0	841	233

=== Record ===
Note: Date shown in brackets indicates when the record was or last set.

Record	England	United States
Longest winning streak	21 (8 Jun 1993–Present)	1 (14 Apr 1991–8 Jun 1993)
Largest points for
Home	89 (21 November 2021)	21 (7 August 2013)
Away	39 (9 July 2016)	14 (22 August 2008, 3 September 2022)
Neutral venue	61 (17 August 2017)	26 (17 August 2017)
Largest winning margin
Home	89 (21 November 2021)	—
Away	33 (28 June 2019)	—
Neutral venue	40 (29 September 2024)	7 (14 April 1991)

== Results ==
No.	Date	Venue	Score	Winner	Competition	Ref
1	16 April 1991	Cardiff Arms Park, Cardiff, Wales	6 – 19	United States	1991 Women's Rugby World Cup final	
2	8 June 1993	Fletcher's Field, Toronto, Canada	17 – 6	England	1993 Canada Cup	
3	24 April 1994	Edinburgh Academicals RFC, Edinburgh, Scotland	38 – 23	England	1994 Women's Rugby World Cup final	
4	23 September 2000	Winnipeg, Canada	31 – 7	England	2000 Canada Cup	
5	18 June 2003	Thunderbird Stadium, Vancouver, Canada	15 – 8	England	2003 Women's Churchill Cup	
6	31 August 2006	St. Albert Rugby Park, St. Albert, Canada	18 – 0	England	2006 Women's Rugby World Cup pool stage	
7	15 December 2007	London Irish, Reading	34 – 0	England		
8	19 August 2008	Molesey Road, Esher	50 – 3	England		
9	22 August 2008	Molesey Road, Esher	17 – 14	England	2008 Nations Cup	
10	10 August 2009	Appleby College, Oakville, Canada	36 – 7	England	2009 Nations Cup	
11	28 August 2010	Surrey Sports Park, Guildford	37 – 10	England	2010 Women's Rugby World Cup pool stage	
12	2 August 2011	Appleby College, Oakville, Canada	15 – 11	England	2011 Nations Cup	
13	7 August 2013	University of Northern Colorado, Greenley	21 – 36	England	2013 Nations Cup	
14	27 June 2015	Calgary Rugby Park, Calgary, Canada	13 – 39	England	2015 Women's Rugby Super Series	
15	9 July 2016	Regional Athletic Complex, Salt Lake City	39 – 13	England	2016 Women's Rugby Super Series	
16	17 August 2017	Billings Park UCD, Dublin, Ireland	47 – 26	England	2017 Women's Rugby World Cup pool stage	
17	9 November 2018	Barnet Copthall, London	57 – 5	England	2018 Autumn International	
18	28 June 2019	Chula Vista, San Diego	38 – 5	England	2019 Women's Rugby Super Series	
19	21 November 2021	Sixways Stadium, Worcester	89 – 0	England	2021 Autumn International	
20	3 September 2022	Sandy Park, Exeter	52 – 14	England	2021 Women's Rugby World Cup warm-up	
21	29 September 2024	BC Place, Vancouver	61 – 21	England	2024 WXV	
22	22 August 2025	Stadium of Light, Sunderland	69 – 7	England	2025 Women's Rugby World Cup pool stage	
