= History of women's rugby union matches between France and New Zealand =

France and New Zealand first met on 14 September 1996 in the Canada Cup, the Black Ferns trounced the French (109–0) in Edmonton. New Zealand won their next four encounters with three of them occurring in different Rugby World Cups in 2002, 2006 and 2010.

France registered their first win against the Black Ferns on 17 November 2018 at the Stade des Alpes in Grenoble. The Black Ferns then suffered three consecutive losses to the French in the following years, before recording a win in their fourth World Cup encounter in 2022.

== Summary ==
=== Overall ===
| Details | Played | Won by France | Won by New Zealand | Drawn | France points | New Zealand points |
|---|---|---|---|---|---|---|
| In France | 4 | 3 | 1 | 0 | 97 | 61 |
| In New Zealand | 2 | 1 | 1 | 0 | 42 | 42 |
| Neutral venue | 7 | 1 | 6 | 0 | 82 | 301 |
| Overall | 13 | 5 | 8 | 0 | 221 | 404 |

=== Record ===
Note: Date shown in brackets indicates when the record was or last set.

| Record | France | New Zealand |
|---|---|---|
| Longest winning streak | 4 (16 Nov 2018–5 Nov 2022) | 6 (14 Sep 1996–16 Nov 2018) |
Largest points for
| Home | 38 (13 November 2021) | 25 (5 November 2022) |
| Away | 24 (5 November 2022) | 27 (16 November 2018) |
| Neutral venue | 25 (4 July 2019) | 109 (14 September 2014) |
Largest winning margin
| Home | 25 (13 November 2021) | 1 (5 November 2022) |
| Away | 1 (21 October 2023) | 14 (9 November 2018) |
| Neutral venue | 9 (6 July 2019) | 109 (14 September 1996) |

== Results ==
| No. | Date | Venue | Score | Winner | Competition | Ref. |
|---|---|---|---|---|---|---|
| 1 | 14 September 1996 | Ellerslie Rugby Park, Edmonton, Canada | 0 – 109 | New Zealand | 1996 Canada Cup | |
| 2 | 21 May 2002 | Cornellà de Llobregat, Barcelona, Spain | 30 – 0 | New Zealand | 2002 Women's Rugby World Cup Semi-final | |
| 3 | 12 September 2006 | Ellerslie Rugby Park, Edmonton, Canada | 20 – 10 | New Zealand | 2006 Women's Rugby World Cup Semi-final | |
| 4 | 1 September 2010 | Twickenham Stoop, London, England | 45 – 7 | New Zealand | 2010 Women's Rugby World Cup Semi-final | |
| 5 | 9 November 2018 | Stade Mayol, Toulon | 0 – 14 | New Zealand | 2018 New Zealand tour of France | |
| 6 | 17 November 2018 | Stade des Alpes, Grenoble | 30 – 27 | France | 2018 New Zealand tour of France | |
| 7 | 6 July 2019 | Chula Vista, San Diego, United States | 25 – 16 | France | 2019 Women's Rugby Super Series | |
| 8 | 13 November 2021 | Stade du Hameau, Pau | 38 – 13 | France | 2021 New Zealand tour of England and France | |
| 9 | 20 November 2021 | Stade Pierre-Fabre, Castres | 29 – 7 | France | 2021 New Zealand tour of England and France | |
| 10 | 5 November 2022 | Eden Park, Auckland | 25 – 24 | New Zealand | 2021 Rugby World Cup Semi-final | |
| 11 | 21 October 2023 | Wellington Regional Stadium, Wellington | 17 – 18 | France | 2023 WXV 1 | —N/a |
| 12 | 12 October 2024 | BC Place, Vancouver | 39 – 14 | New Zealand | 2024 WXV 1 | |
| 13 | 26 September 2025 | Twickenham Stadium, London | 42 – 26 | New Zealand | 2025 Women's Rugby World Cup | |
