= Darryl Suasua =

Darryl Suasua MNZM
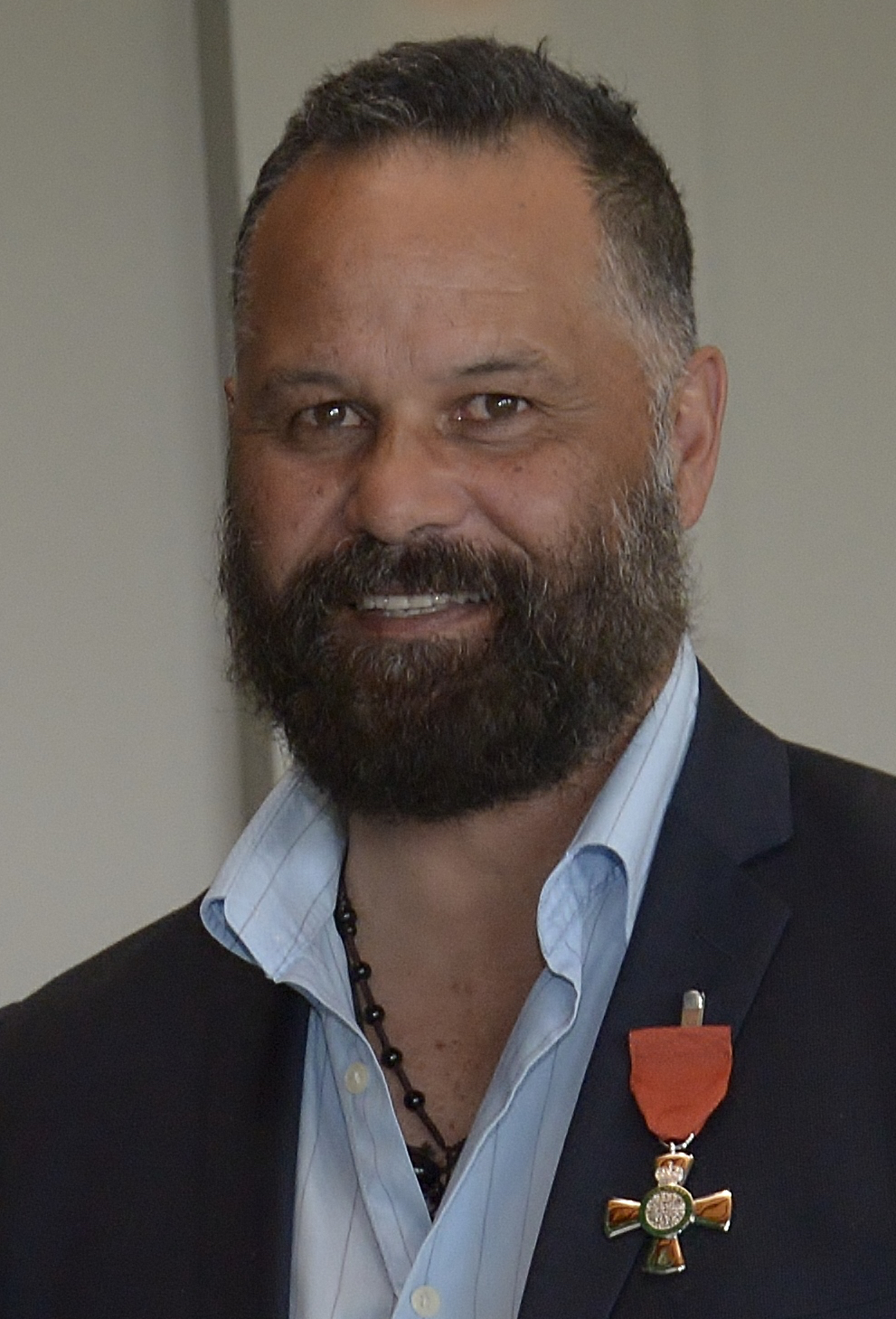
- Suasua in 2018
- Born: Darryl Bill Suasua; 6 May 1965 (age 61) Auckland

Rugby union career
Coaching career
- Years: Team
- 2016–2020: Counties Manukau
- 2012–2015: Samoa (Backs Assistant Coach)
- 2008–2009: New Zealand 7s
- 2000–2002: New Zealand 7s
- 1996–2002: New Zealand

Darryl Bill Suasua MNZM (born 6 May 1965) is a New Zealand rugby union coach. He has coached the New Zealand women's national rugby union team and the New Zealand women's national rugby sevens team.

== Coaching career ==
Suasua was formerly the Head coach of the New Zealand women's national rugby union team, he coached them for seven years in which they won both the 1998 and 2002 Women's Rugby World Cups. They also won the 1996 and 2000 Canada Cups.

He also coached the New Zealand women's sevens side for the 2009 Rugby World Cup Sevens in Dubai. They lost to Australia in the finals 10–15.

Suasua was the Backs Assistant Coach for Samoa under Head Coach Stephen Betham. He was Head coach of Counties Manukau in the Mitre 10 Cup from 2016 to 2020.

In the 2018 Queen's Birthday Honours, Suasua was appointed a Member of the New Zealand Order of Merit, for services to rugby.

Sporting positions
Preceded by Vicky Dombroski	Black Ferns coach 1996–2002	Succeeded by Jed Rowlands
