= History of women's rugby union matches between England and New Zealand =

England women and New Zealand women played against each other for the first time on 13 August 1997 at Burnham, New Zealand. The Black Ferns ran in ten tries against a scoreless England in their (67–0) victory. The Red Roses recorded their first win against the Black Ferns on 16 June 2001 at North Harbour Stadium, Albany, winning (22–17).

They have played each other 34 times, New Zealand winning 19 games, England 14, with one draw between them. New Zealand played their 100th test match on 31 October 2021, and were defeated (12–43) by England at Sandy Park.

England and New Zealand have met at the Rugby World Cup on six occasions. Once in the semi-final, at the 1998 World Cup in Amsterdam, and five times in the final at the 2002, 2006, 2010, 2017 and the recently delayed 2021 Rugby World Cup.

== Summary ==
=== Overall ===
Details	Played	Won by England	Won by New Zealand	Drawn	England points	New Zealand points
In England	14	10	3	1	296	174
In New Zealand	11	3	8	0	175	295
Neutral venue	9	1	8	0	151	284
Overall	34	14	19	1	622	753

=== Record ===
Note: Date shown in brackets indicates when the record was or last set.

Record	England	New Zealand
Longest winning streak	4 (4 November 2023–26 September 2026)	6 (25 May 2002–21 Nov 2009)
Largest points for
Home	56 (7 November 2021)	67 (13 August 1997)
Away	33 (4 November 2023)	25 (29 November 2016)
Neutral venue	49 (6 October 2024)	44 (12 May 1998)
Largest winning margin
Home	41 (7 November 2021)	67 (13 August 1997)
Away	21 (4 November 2023)	13 (14 November 2009)
Neutral venue	18 (6 October 2024)	33 (12 May 1998)

== Results ==
No.	Date	Venue	Score	Winner	Competition
1	13 August 1997	Burnham	67 – 0	New Zealand	
2	12 May 1998	Amsterdam, Netherlands	11 – 44	New Zealand	1998 Women's Rugby World Cup Semi-Final
3	30 September 2000	Winnipeg, Canada	13 – 32	New Zealand	2000 Canada Cup
4	9 July 2001	Rotorua	15 – 10	New Zealand	2001 Summer International
5	16 July 2001	North Harbour Stadium, Albany	17 – 22	England	2001 Summer International
6	25 May 2002	Olympic Stadium, Barcelona, Spain	19 – 9	New Zealand	2002 Women's Rugby World Cup Final
7	19 June 2004	Edmonton, Canada	0 – 38	New Zealand	2004 Women's Churchill Cup Final
8	22 October 2005	Eden Park, Auckland	24 – 15	New Zealand	
9	26 October 2005	Waikato Stadium, Hamilton	33 – 8	New Zealand	
10	17 September 2006	Commonwealth Stadium, Edmonton, Canada	17 – 25	New Zealand	2006 Women's Rugby World Cup Final
11	14 November 2009	Molesey Road, Esher	3 – 16	New Zealand	2009 Autumn International
12	21 November 2009	Twickenham Stadium, London	10 – 3	England	2009 Autumn International
13	5 September 2010	Twickenham Stoop, London	13 – 10	New Zealand	2010 Women's Rugby World Cup Final
14	26 November 2011	Twickenham Stadium, London	10 – 0	England	2011 Autumn International
15	29 November 2011	Molesey Road, Esher	21 – 7	England	2011 Autumn International
16	3 December 2011	Molesey Road, Esher	8 – 8	draw	2011 Autumn International
17	23 November 2012	Molesey Road, Esher	16 – 13	England	2012 Autumn International
18	27 November 2012	Aldershot Military Stadium, Aldershot	17 – 8	England	2012 Autumn International
19	1 December 2012	Twickenham Stadium, London	32 – 23	England	2012 Autumn International
20	13 July 2013	Eden Park, Auckland	29 – 10	New Zealand	2013 Summer International
21	16 July 2013	Waikato Stadium, Hamilton	14 – 9	New Zealand	2013 Summer International
22	20 July 2013	ECOlight Stadium, Pukekohe	29 – 8	New Zealand	2013 Summer International
23	1 July 2015	Red Deer Titans Rugby Park, Red Deer, Canada	26 – 7	New Zealand	2015 Women's Rugby Super Series
24	19 November 2016	Twickenham Stoop, London	20 – 25	New Zealand	2016 Autumn International
25	17 June 2017	Rotorua International Stadium, Rotorua	21 – 29	England	2017 Women's Rugby World Cup Warm-Up
26	26 August 2017	Kingspan Stadium, Belfast, Ireland	32 – 41	New Zealand	2017 Women's Rugby World Cup Final
27	14 July 2019	Torero Stadium, San Diego, United States	28 – 13	New Zealand	2019 Women's Rugby Super Series
28	31 October 2021	Sandy Park, Exeter	43 – 12	England	2021 Autumn International
29	7 November 2021	Franklin's Gardens, Northampton	56 – 15	England	2021 Autumn International
30	12 November 2022	Eden Park, Auckland	31 – 34	New Zealand	2021 Rugby World Cup Final
31	4 November 2023	Mount Smart Stadium, Auckland	33 – 12	England	2023 WXV 1
32	14 September 2024	Twickenham Stadium, London	24 – 12	England	
33	6 October 2024	Langley Events Centre, Langley, Canada	49 – 31	England	2024 WXV 1
34	26 September 2026	Twickenham Stadium, London	26 – 19	England	2026 WXV Global Series
