= History of women's rugby union matches between Australia and the United States =

Australia and the United States first met on 2 August 1997 in Brisbane, Australia. They have played each other ten times in total, with the USA Eagles winning six of those encounters.

The two nations have met at four separate Rugby World Cups — firstly at the 2002 tournament in Spain, followed by further matches in 2006, 2014 and 2025. During the 2006 tournament, they faced each other in the pool stages and the play-offs, with the United States winning on both occasions. At the 2025 tournament, the two countries played out their first ever drawn result.

== Summary ==
=== Overall ===
Details	Played	Won by Australia	Won by United States	Drawn	Australia points	United States points
In Australia	3	1	2	0	76	79
In the United States	0	0	0	0	0	0
Neutral venue	7	2	4	1	158	131
Overall	10	3	6	1	234	210

=== Record ===
Note: The date shown in brackets indicates when the record was, or last set.

Record	Australia	United States
Longest winning streak	1 (2 Aug 1998–21 May 2002, 8 Jul 2023–17 May 2024, 17 May 2025–30 Aug 2025)	4 (8 Sep 2006–8 Jul 2023)
Largest points for
Home	27 (17 May 2025)	N/A
Away	N/A	28 (2 August 1998)
Neutral venue	58 (8 July 2023)	29 (12 September 2006)
Largest winning margin
Home	8 (17 May 2025)	N/A
Away	N/A	4 (2 August 1998)
Neutral venue	41 (8 July 2023)	17 (12 September 2006)

== Results ==
No.	Date	Venue	Score	Winner	Event
1	2 August 1998	Brisbane	24 – 28	United States	Test match
2	21 May 2002	Barcelona, Spain	17 – 5	Australia	2002 Rugby World Cup 5th place play-offs
3	8 September 2006	Ellerslie Rugby Park, Edmonton, Canada	6 – 10	United States	2006 Rugby World Cup pool stages
4	12 September 2006	St. Albert Rugby Park, St. Albert, Canada	12 – 29	United States	2006 Rugby World Cup 5th place play-offs
5	13 August 2014	CNR, Marcoussis, France	20 – 23	United States	2014 Rugby World Cup 5th place play-offs
6	12 June 2022	The Trusts Arena, Auckland, New Zealand	16 – 14	United States	2022 Pacific Four Series
7	8 July 2023	TD Place Stadium, Ottawa, Canada	58 – 17	Australia	2023 Pacific Four Series
8	17 May 2024	Melbourne Rectangular Stadium, Melbourne	25 – 32	United States	2024 Pacific Four Series
9	17 May 2025	Canberra Stadium, Canberra	27 – 19	Australia	2025 Pacific Four Series
10	30 August 2025	York Community Stadium, York, England	31 – 31	Draw	2025 Rugby World Cup pool stages
