= Dale Atkins =

NZ rugby union player

- Born: 29 August 1961 (age 65) Levin, New Zealand

Rugby union career
- Position: No. 8
Provincial / State sides
Years	Team	Apps	(Points)
1980–1988	Canterbury	95	(188)
International career
Years	Team	Apps	(Points)
1980, 1983	Māori All Blacks	4	(8)
Coaching career
- Years: Team
- 2007–2009: New Zealand

Dale Atkins (born 29 August 1961) is a former first class rugby player and coach of the New Zealand women's national rugby union team.

== Rugby career ==
Atkins played as a No 8 forward for Canterbury from 1980 until 1988. He is especially known for his prominent role in the Alex Wyllie coached team which held the Ranfurly Shield from 1982 until 1985. During this Canterbury Ranfurly Shield era he was a key player and scoring a large number of tries, for example 9 in 14 games in 1983 and 10 in 15 games in 1984. His trademark was his strong running of off the back of the scrum.

Atkins also represented:

- New Zealand Colts (U21) in 1980 and 1981
- New Zealand Juniors (U23) in 1984
- New Zealand Maori in 1980 and 1983
- New Zealand Universities from 1983–87
- South Island in 1984 and 1985

With Murray Mexted the incumbent All Black No 8 in the earlier 1980s and later Mike Brewer and Wayne Shelford, Atkins was unable to gain higher honours for the All Blacks. The selectors who also favoured players such as Geoff Old, Alan Whetton and Andy Earl for their greater height for lineouts and versatility across other positions.

== Coaching ==
Atkins replaced Jed Rowlands as coach of the Black Ferns in 2007, after having been Rowlands assistant coach. He was assisted by his former Canterbury teammate and former All Blacks centre Warwick Taylor. He was not reappointed in 2009 despite not losing a single game during his term as coach.

Sporting positions
Preceded by Jed Rowlands	Black Ferns coach 2007–2009	Succeeded by Brian Evans
