= Grant Hansen (rugby union) =

Rugby union career
Coaching career
- Years: Team
- 2009–2010: New Zealand (assistant coach)
- 2011: New Zealand (head coach)
- 2012–2014: New Zealand (assistant coach)

Grant Hansen is a New Zealand rugby union coach.

Hansen was appointed as Assistant Coach to Brian Evans in 2009. When Evans took a break from coaching in 2011, Hansen, who was Assistant Coach then, was appointed as the Black Ferns Head Coach by New Zealand Rugby. His Assistant Coach was John Kyle.

Hansen coached the Black Ferns in three tests against England.

Sporting positions
Preceded by Brian Evans	Black Ferns coach 2011	Succeeded by Brian Evans
