= Jed Rowlands =

New Zealand rugby union coach

Rugby union career
- Position: Coach
Super Rugby
| Years | Team | Apps | (Points) |
| | Auckland Blues | | (0) |
Coaching career
- Years: Team
- 2003–2006: New Zealand Women's
- 1999: (New Zealand) Auckland Blues
- 1997–1998: (New Zealand) Taranaki

Jed Rowlands is a New Zealand rugby union coach. He coached the Black Ferns, the New Zealand women's national rugby team from 2003 to 2006.

Rowlands coached Taranaki in the NPC from 1997 and 1998, he took them to the semifinals in his final year.

In 1999, Rowlands coached the Auckland Blues Super Rugby professional side. After finishing ninth at the end of the Super Rugby season, he was released as Blues head coach and as Auckland's coach without ever leading them into a game.

In November 2002, He was named as the Black Ferns new head coach replacing Darryl Suasua. He coached the Black Ferns to their third Rugby World Cup victory in 2006. He led the Black Ferns to 15 test wins in a row as Head Coach.

Sporting positions
| Preceded by Darryl Suasua | Black Ferns coach 2003–2006 | Succeeded by Dale Atkins |
