= Brian Evans (rugby union) =

New Zealand rugby union coach

Brian Evans ONZM
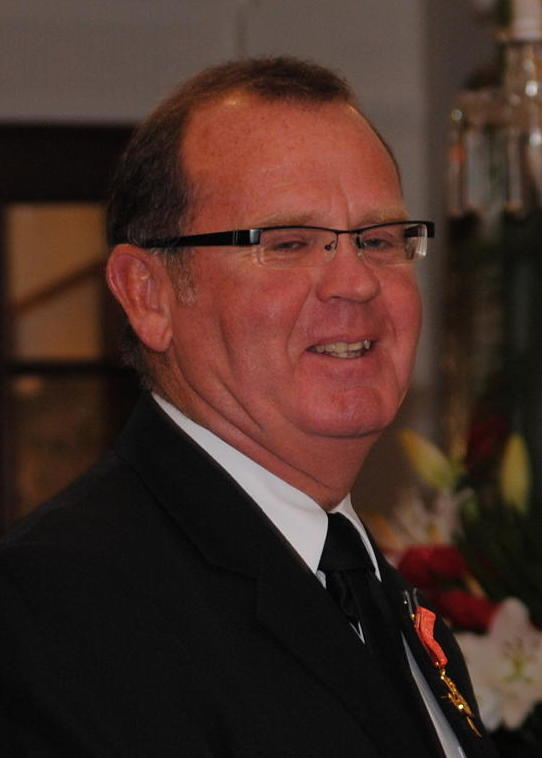
- Evans in 2011
- Born: Brian Francis Evans
- Occupation: School principal

Rugby union career
- Position: Coach
Coaching career
- Years: Team
- 2009–2014: Black Ferns
- 2011: Kelston BHS
- 2008: De La Salle College
- 2007: Auckland Women

Brian Francis Evans ONZM is a New Zealand rugby union coach, and former head coach of the New Zealand women's national team.

== Career ==
Evans coached De La Salle College to victory in 2008 in the National First XV Championship. He is currently the principal of Wesley College, Auckland.

=== Provincial ===
In 2007 he coached the victorious Auckland Women's team.

=== International ===
Evans was appointed Head Coach of the New Zealand women's national team in 2009 with Grant Hansen as Assistant Coach.

Evans coached the Black Fern's to success as they won the 2010 Rugby World Cup. In 2011, He took a short break from coaching before returning as Head Coach in 2012.

Evans stepped down as Black Ferns head coach after a poor performance at the 2014 World Cup.

== Honours ==
In the 2011 New Year Honours, Evans was appointed an Officer of the New Zealand Order of Merit (ONZM) for services to women's rugby.

Sporting positions
Preceded by Dale Atkins	Black Ferns coach 2009–2010	Succeeded by Grant Hansen
Preceded by Grant Hansen	Black Ferns coach 2012–2014	Succeeded by Greg Smith
