= 2005 Canada Cup (rugby union) =

Tournament details
- Host: Canada
- Dates: 29 June 2005– 8 July 2005
- Teams: 3

Final positions
- Champions: New Zealand
- Runner-up: Canada

Tournament statistics
- Matches played: 4

The 2005 Canada Cup was a women's rugby union competition held in Ottawa, Canada, between 29 June and 8 July 2005. It was the fourth Canada Cup tournament held, and the sixth when including the 2003 and 2004 women's Churchill Cup tournaments hosted by Canada. It was the first of the series in which the US did not compete — Canada's opponents were New Zealand and Scotland.

The competition returned to the 2003 format with a three-nation round-robin, followed by a final between the top two.

== Final table ==
Pos	Nation	Pld	W	D	L	PF	PA	PD	Pts
1	New Zealand	2	2	0	0	73	12	+61	4
2	Canada	2	1	0	1	25	52	−27	2
3	Scotland	2	0	0	2	18	52	−34	0

== Results ==
=== Group stage ===
2005-06-29

New Zealand	30–9	Scotland

Ottawa

2005-07-02

Canada	22–9	Scotland

Ottawa

2005-07-05

Canada	3–43	New Zealand

Ottawa

=== Final ===
2005-07-08

Canada	5–32	New Zealand

Ottawa

== See also ==
- Women's international rugby - includes all women's international match results
- Churchill Cup

Preceded by Women's Churchill Cup 2004	Canada Cup; 2005; New Zealand	Succeeded by
