= Canada Cup (rugby union) =

Women's rugby union tournament held in Canada

- Sport: Rugby union
- Founded: 1993
- Folded: 2005
- No. of teams: 3-4
- Country: Canada; England; France; New Zealand; Scotland; United States; Wales
- Last champion: New Zealand

The Canada Cup was an international women's rugby union tournament staged in Canada. The tournament generally features Canada, and two or three other invited nations. So far there have been four tournaments - 1993, 1996, 2000, and 2005. In addition in 2003 and 2004 Canada hosted the Women's version of the "Churchill Cup" - a competition that was in every way identical to the Canada Cup and whose records may reasonably be included with it.

The records for the six Canada and women's Churchill Cup tournaments appear below.

== Appearances ==
Seven nations have taken part in the six Canada and women's Churchill Cup tournaments held to date:

Nations	Appearances	Years
Canada	6	
England	4	1993, 2000, 2003, 2004
France	1	1996
New Zealand	4	1996, 2000, 2004, 2005
Scotland	1	2005
United States	5	1993, 1996, 2000, 2003, 2004
Wales	1	1993

== Winners ==
Winners	Wins	Years
New Zealand	4	1996, 2000, 2004, 2005
England	2	1993, 2003

== See also ==
- Women's international rugby - includes all women's international match results
- Churchill Cup
