= 2003 Women's Churchill Cup =

Tournament details
- Host: Canada
- Dates: 14 June 2003– 28 June 2003
- Teams: 3

Final positions
- Champions: England
- Runner-up: Canada

Tournament statistics
- Matches played: 4

The 2003 Women's Churchill Cup was the fourth edition of the tournament, now rebranded the "Churchill Cup" and played at the same time as the men's event, took place at the Thunderbird Stadium in Vancouver. Only three countries took part - England joining the hosts and the United States.

A slightly different format saw the three nations compete in a round-robin, followed by a final between the top two. The result was the closest result yet with three of the four games being won by less than seven points.

== Final table ==
Pos	Nation	Pld	W	D	L	PF	PA	PD	Pts
1	England	2	2	0	0	25	13	+12	4
2	Canada	2	1	0	1	23	23	0	2
3	United States	2	0	0	2	21	33	−12	0

== Results ==
=== Group stage ===
2003-06-14

Canada	5–10	England

Thunderbird Stadium, Vancouver

2003-06-18

England	15–8	United States

Thunderbird Stadium, Vancouver

2003-06-20

Canada	18–13	United States

Thunderbird Stadium, Vancouver

=== Final ===
2003-06-28

Canada	18–21	England

Thunderbird Stadium, Vancouver

== See also ==
- Women's international rugby - includes all women's international match results
- Churchill Cup

Preceded by Canada Cup 2000	Women's Churchill Cup; 2003; England	Succeeded by Women's Churchill Cup 2004
