= Triangular '99 =

Tournament details
- Host: New Zealand
- Date: 13–19 October 1999
- Teams: 3

Final positions
- Champions: New Zealand
- Runner-up: Canada

Tournament statistics
- Matches played: 3
- Top scorer(s): Tammi Wilson (49 points)

The Triangular 99 was a short international women's rugby tournament held in New Zealand at the end of 1999. It featured the winner and runner up from the previous year's World Cup (New Zealand and the USA), plus Canada. It was won easily by the hosts.

== Final table ==
Rank	Nation	Games				Points		Table points
Rank	Nation	played	won	drawn	lost	for	against	Table points
1	New Zealand	2	2	0	0	138	5	4
2	Canada	2	1	0	1	18	88	2
3	United States	2	0	0	2	20	83	0

== Results ==
Test: 272	13 October	Canada	18–15	United States	Palmerston North, New Zealand

Test: 273	16 October	New Zealand	73–0	Canada	Palmerston North, New Zealand
		Try: Kahura; Martin (2); Richards; Rush; Shelford (4); Shortland; Wall; Wilson (2); Con: Rush (2); Wilson (4)	Report		Referee: (New Zealand) Neville McAlister

Test: 274	19 October	New Zealand	65–5	United States	Palmerston North, New Zealand
		Try: Dawson; Gray; Robinson; Shelford; Shortland; Wilson (6); Con: Wilson (3)	Report		Referee: (New Zealand) Paul Macfie
