= Billings Park UCD =

Sports pitch at the University College Dublin

Coordinates: 53°18′37″N 6°13′41″W

Billings Park
- Location within Dublin
- Location: Dublin, Ireland
- Owner: University College Dublin
- Capacity: 2,000
- Surface: Grass
- Public transit: Sydney Parade railway station Stillorgan Road / Nutley Lane bus stop

Tenant
- UCD GAA Club

Billings Park is a GAA ground in Dún Laoghaire–Rathdown, Ireland. It is one of the sports pitches at University College Dublin and is located on its Belfield campus. The pitch is named after Dave Billings, a former UCD student who spent 18 years as Head of Gaelic Games in UCD.

It was one of the venues for the 2017 Women's Rugby World Cup.
