= 2004 Women's Churchill Cup =

Tournament details
- Host: Canada
- Dates: 8 June 2004– 19 June 2004
- Teams: 4

Final positions
- Champions: New Zealand
- Runner-up: England

Tournament statistics
- Matches played: 5

The 2004 Women's Churchill Cup was the second edition of the women's "Churchill Cup" and the first tournament to be played across two venues, in Calgary and Edmonton. Four countries took part again - New Zealand joining England, the United States, and Canada.

For the first time the group stages were dropped and the tournament became a straight knock-out with semi-finals at the Calgary Rugby Park and the finals at Commonwealth Stadium, Edmonton. New Zealand won the tournament after defeating England 38–0 in the final.

== Results ==
=== Warm-up ===
2004-06-08

Canada	5–32	New Zealand

Thunderbird Stadium, Vancouver

=== Semi-finals ===
2004-06-13

New Zealand	35–0	United States

Calgary Rugby Park

2004-06-13

Canada	11–35	England

Calgary Rugby Park

=== Finals ===
==== Third place ====
2004-06-19

Canada	10–29	United States

Edmonton

==== Final ====
2004-06-19

England	0–38	New Zealand

Edmonton

== See also ==
- Women's international rugby - includes all women's international match results
- Churchill Cup

Preceded by Women's Churchill Cup 2003	Women's Churchill Cup; 2004; New Zealand	Succeeded by Canada Cup 2005
