= 1996 Canada Cup =

Tournament details
- Host: Canada
- Dates: 8 September 1996– 14 September 1996
- Teams: 4

Final positions
- Champions: New Zealand
- Runner-up: United States

Tournament statistics
- Matches played: 6

The 1996 Canada Cup was the second edition to take place and was hosted by Edmonton. It was a women's rugby union competition and featured New Zealand, France, the USA and the hosts, Canada. New Zealand had missed the previous World Cup in 1994 and, aside from a couple of games against an untried Australia, had played no international rugby since 1991, when they had lost to the USA in the World Cup semi-finals. Despite this they won all three games they played and won the tournament.

== Final table ==
Pos	Nation	Pld	W	D	L	PF	PA	PD	Pts
1	New Zealand	3	3	0	0	283	11	+272	6
2	United States	3	2	0	1	69	116	−47	4
3	Canada	3	1	0	2	51	113	−62	2
4	France	3	0	0	3	19	182	−163	0

== Results ==
1996-09-08

Canada	3–88	New Zealand

Edmonton

1996-09-08

France	16–39	United States

Edmonton

1996-09-11

New Zealand	86–8	United States

Edmonton

1996-09-11

Canada	34–3	France

Edmonton

1996-09-14

France	0–109	New Zealand

Edmonton

1996-09-14

Canada	14–22	United States

Edmonton

== See also ==
- Women's international rugby - includes all women's international match results
- Churchill Cup

Preceded by Canada Cup 1993	Canada Cup; 1996; New Zealand	Succeeded by Canada Cup 2000
