= United States Olympic Training Center =

Coordinates: 38.840853°N 104.796288°W

The United States Olympic & Paralympic Training Centers (OPTCs) are two campuses created by the United States Olympic & Paralympic Committee (USOPC) as training facilities for its Olympic and Paralympic athletes. They are located in Colorado Springs, Colorado, and Lake Placid, New York. Formerly, the USOPC also had a third OPTC in Chula Vista, California, which is now the city-owned Chula Vista Elite Athlete Training Center. There is a U.S. Olympic Education Center in Marquette, Michigan, and other official U.S. Olympic/Paralympic training sites are located in Oklahoma City and Edmond, Oklahoma; Carson, California; Lakeshore Foundation in Birmingham, Alabama; the Pettit National Ice Center in West Allis, Wisconsin; a USRowing training center in Oakland, California (previously in Princeton, New Jersey); Huntsville, Texas, the SPIRE Institute and Academy near Geneva, Ohio, and the University of Illinois Urbana-Champaign.

Some athletes preparing for the Olympics, Paralympics, and Pan American Games live at one of the OPTCs for a period of months or years, while others visit periodically with their respective national teams for training camps, coaching (especially in sports science and sports psychology), or physical testing. Foreign national teams are also granted use of the USOPTCs.

The USOPTCs are all open to the general public for tourism.

== Colorado Springs ==
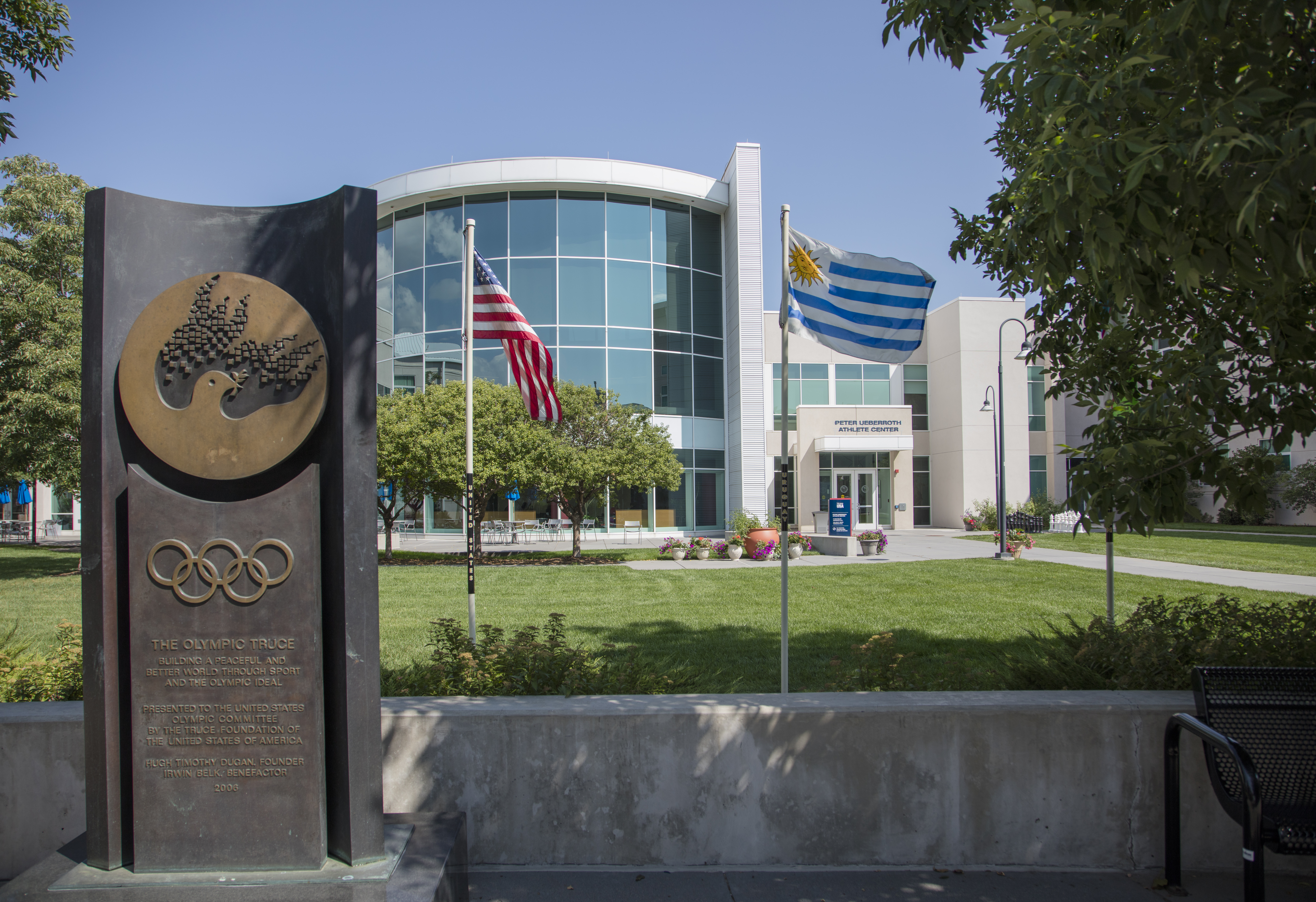
The U.S. Olympic Training Center in Colorado Springs, Colorado.

The Colorado Springs OPTC was the first to be built, and has been the home of the U.S. Olympic & Paralympic Committee since 1978. Its location on the former Ent Air Force Base was selected for its relatively high elevation, which is often thought to improve training effectiveness. Its facilities include an Olympic-size swimming pool, an indoor shooting range, the Olympic Training Center Velodrome, two sports centers housing numerous gymnasiums and weight rooms, and a sports science laboratory, in addition to an athlete center and dining hall, several dormitories, a visitors' center, and the offices of both the USOPC and U.S. Paralympics.

Athletes like LeBron James, Michael Jordan, Simone Biles, Kyle Snyder, Clarissa Shields and Katie Ledecky have trained at the Colorado Springs facility.

== Lake Placid ==
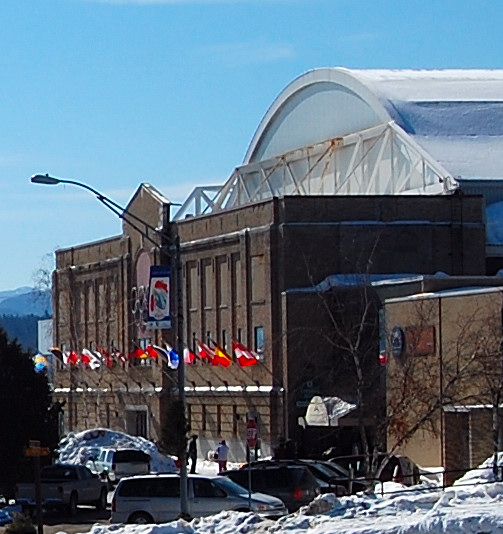
The Jack Shea Arena in Lake Placid, New York.

The Lake Placid OPTC facility opened in November 1982, two years after hosting the 1980 Winter Games. The LPOPTC is home to four resident sports: Bobsled/Skeleton, Luge, Freestyle Ski, and Biathlon. Athletes from boxing, canoe and kayak, judo, rowing, synchronized swimming, taekwondo, team handball, water polo and wrestling also train frequently on site.

== Chula Vista ==
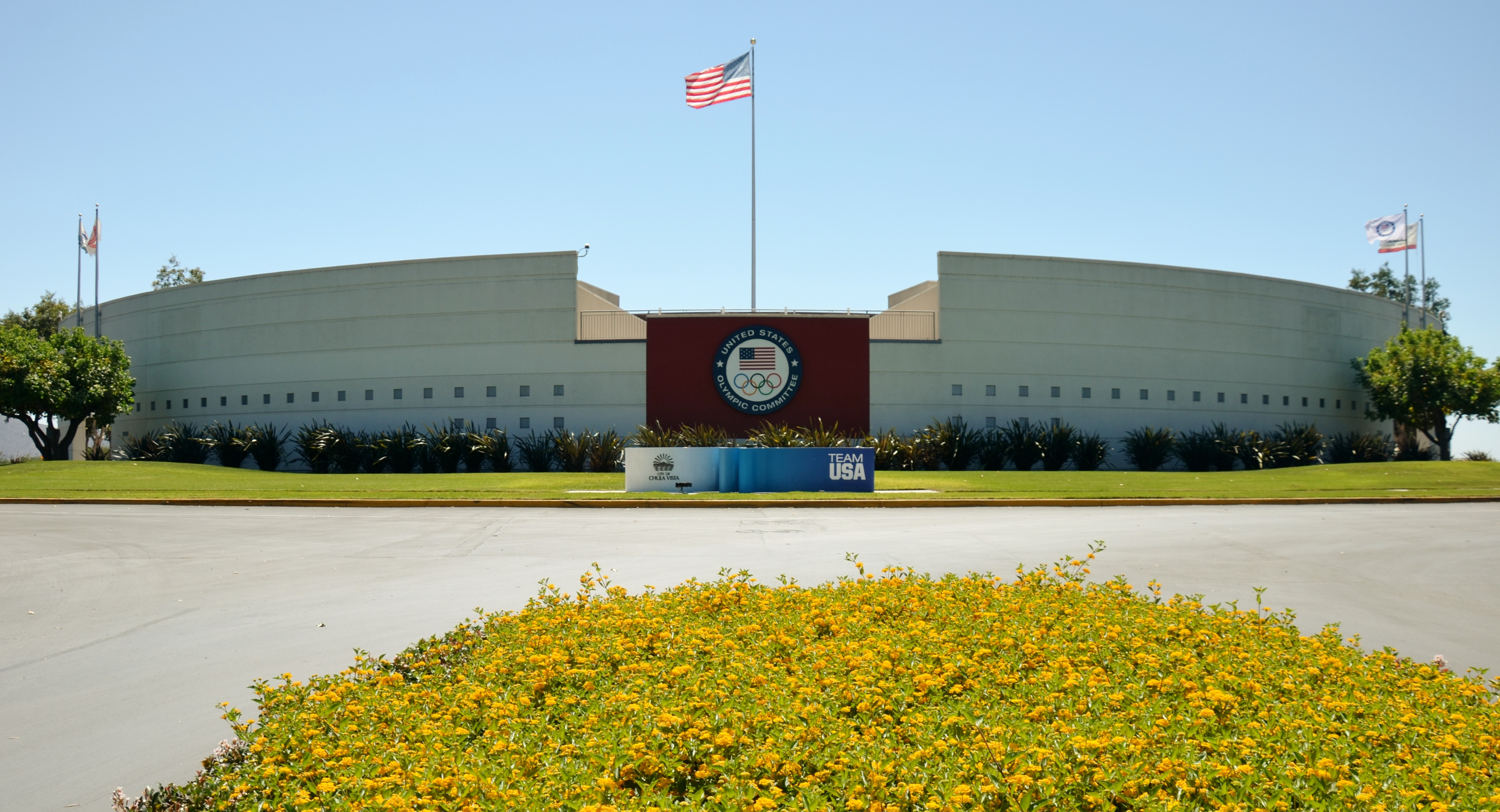
The Olympic Training Center in Chula Vista, California.

A third OPTC opened in June 1995 in Chula Vista, which is located about 7 miles (11 km) south of the city of San Diego, California. The campus was originally named the ARCO Training Center until 2000 for sponsorship reasons. In January 2017, the USOC transferred ownership of the site to the City of Chula Vista, which was renamed the Chula Vista Elite Athlete Training Center. This was done as the USOPC shifts its operations strategy away from directly operating the training facilities. The USOPC continues to fund athlete programming at the Chula Vista center through at least 2024.

The 150-acre campus features sport venues and support facilities for eight Olympic sports: archery, canoe/kayak, cycling, field hockey, rowing, soccer, softball and track & field. Over the years, more facilities such as beach volleyball courts and a BMX track were added. The Chula Vista center is also home to the annual SoCal Showdown, a national-level archery tournament that attracts archers from around the country to compete in a several day competition consisting of qualifications and eliminations. It also serves as a training site for the U.S. men's and women's rugby sevens teams.

Preceded by Rino Mercante Stadium; Bassano del Grappa	UCI Track Cycling World Championships; Venue; 1986	Succeeded by Ferry-Dusika-Hallenstadion; Vienna
