= 2000 Canada Cup =

Tournament details
- Host: Canada
- Dates: 23 September 2000– 30 September 2000
- Teams: 4

Final positions
- Champions: New Zealand
- Runner-up: England

Tournament statistics
- Matches played: 6

Canada Cup 2000 was the third Canada Cup competition in women's rugby hosted in Winnipeg. The hosts, Canada, brought together the new World Champion New Zealand alongside runners-up USA and third placed England. The results were slightly closer than in 1996, but the title was retained by New Zealand.

== Final table ==
Pos	Nation	Pld	W	D	L	PF	PA	PD	Pts
1	New Zealand	3	3	0	0	118	13	+105	6
2	England	3	2	0	1	78	49	+29	4
3	United States	3	1	0	2	22	85	−63	2
4	Canada	3	0	0	3	19	90	−71	0

== Results ==
=== Round 1 ===
2000-09-23

England	31–7	United States

Winnipeg

2000-09-23

Canada	0–41	New Zealand

Winnipeg

=== Round 2 ===
2000-09-27

New Zealand	45–0	United States

Winnipeg

2000-09-27

Canada	10–34	England

Winnipeg

=== Round 3 ===
2000-09-30

England	13–32	New Zealand

Winnipeg

2000-09-30

Canada	9–15	United States

Winnipeg

== See also ==
- Women's international rugby - includes all women's international match results
- Churchill Cup

Preceded by Canada Cup 1996	Canada Cup; 2000; New Zealand	Succeeded by Women's Churchill Cup 2003
