= Ellerslie Rugby Park =

Park in Edmonton, Alberta

Coordinates: 53°25′36″N 113°30′49″W

- Interactive map of Ellerslie Rugby Park
- Location: 10950 Ellerslie Road SW; Edmonton, Alberta
- Owner: ERP Inc (made up of 5 Edmonton Rugby Union clubs plus the Edmonton Rugby Union)
- Surface: Grass

Construction
- Opened: 1984
- Closed: 2022

Tenant
- Edmonton Gold (RCSL) (1998-2008)

Website
- Official website

Ellerslie Rugby Park is a park located in South Edmonton in the neighbourhood of Ellerslie. It was the Edmonton Gold's home field and it also held puts on many private events. There are two buildings on the site, the Banquet Room, and the Clubroom. It was opened in 1984 and closed in 2022 due to a lack of funds and a toxic presence of asbestos exposed due to a major internal flooding.

The park was a major venue for the 2006 Women's Rugby World Cup, hosting nine pool matches, both semifinals, and four classification matches.
