= New Zealand women's national rugby union team =

New Zealand
- Nickname: Black Ferns
- Emblem: Silver-fern frond
- Union: New Zealand
- Head coach: Whitney Hansen
- Captain: Ruahei Demant; Kennedy Tukuafu
- Most caps: Kendra Cocksedge (68)
- Top scorer: Kendra Cocksedge (404)
- Top try scorer: Portia Woodman-Wickliffe (50)
First colours	Second colours

World Rugby ranking
- Current: 3 (as of 30 September 2024)
- Highest: 1 (2003–2012, 2013–2014, 2015–2017, 2017–2020)
- Lowest: 3 (2024–)

First international
- New Zealand 24–8 Canada (Cardiff, Wales; 6 April 1991)

Biggest win
- Germany 6–134 New Zealand (Amsterdam, Netherlands; 2 May 1998)

Biggest defeat
- England 56–15 New Zealand (Northampton, England; 7 November 2021)

World Cup
- Appearances: 9 (First in 1991)
- Best result: Champions (1998, 2002, 2006, 2010, 2017, 2021)
- Website: allblacks.com

Women's World Rugby Rankings Top 20 rankings as of 2 November 2026
Rank	Change*	Team	Points
1	Steady	England	94.20
2	Steady	New Zealand	93.18
3	Steady	Canada	91.68
4	Steady	France	85.00
5	Steady	Ireland	78.29
6	Steady	United States	77.50
7	Steady	Australia	77.18
8	Steady	Italy	71.99
9	Steady	Scotland	71.25
10	Steady	South Africa	70.76
11	Steady	Wales	70.12
12	Steady	Fiji	66.65
13	Steady	Japan	65.00
14	Steady	Spain	63.22
15	Steady	Samoa	58.31
16	Steady	Netherlands	58.29
17	Steady	Hong Kong	55.72
18	Steady	Russia	55.10
19	Steady	Kazakhstan	53.95
20	Steady	Germany	51.12
*Change from the previous ranking update

The New Zealand women's rugby union team, called the Black Ferns (Māori: Rarauhe Pango [ɾaɾaʉhɛ paŋɔ]), represents New Zealand in women's international rugby union, which is the country's national sport. The team has won six out of ten Women's Rugby World Cup tournaments.

As of 27 September 2025, the Black Ferns have an 82 percent winning record in test match rugby. Since their official international debut in 1991, the Black Ferns have lost to only five of the sixteen nations they have played against — Canada, England, France, Ireland and the United States. The team performs a haka before every match; this is a Māori challenge or posture dance. Traditionally the Black Ferns use the haka Ko Uhia Mai.

== History ==
Women's rugby in New Zealand was rising in the late eighties, but recognition and assistance from New Zealand Rugby Football Union (NZRFU) was not available. It was not until 1989 that women's rugby started to get official recognition with the organisation of matches by provinces and clubs. On 22 July that year, New Zealand fielded their first women's rugby union team against a touring United States side, the California Grizzlies.

=== Team's name ===
The team's name refers to the mamaku, the black tree fern, which is a taonga (treasure) of New Zealand. It also aligns with the colour black and the silver fern, which are iconic New Zealand sporting symbols. For example, the All Blacks is New Zealand's men's rugby team, the Black Caps is the men's cricket team, the White Ferns is the women's cricket team, while the Silver Ferns is the women's netball team.

=== World Cup wins ===
The Black Ferns have participated in every Rugby World Cup except for one since its inauguration in 1991, only missing the 1994 World Cup in Scotland. Starting with the inaugural International Rugby Board (IRB)-sponsored tournament in 1998, which was won by New Zealand, the Black Ferns have gone on to win five more titles — including the 2002, 2006, 2010, 2017, and the 2021 tournament which was hosted in New Zealand.

=== Funding ===
While rugby is the most popular spectator game in New Zealand, the Black Ferns have suffered in the past from similar problems to any women's sport: under-funding, lack of support and lack of publicity. While the New Zealand Rugby Union (NZRU) and World Rugby have been criticised to an extent for not doing more to promote women's rugby, support is beginning to improve in those organisations, in large part due to the Ferns' successes.

The NZRU started funding the Black Ferns in 1995, therefore giving a great boost to their game, while the Black Ferns have benefitted from being included in NZRU High Performance initiatives. Along with professional coaches, the team has had access to professional development resources such as analysis. In more recent times, the team's profile has risen greatly at a grassroots level, due in great part to their string of successes, and it is increasingly seen to be a national team on the same basis as any other.

=== Provincial championship ===
In January 2010, the Women's Provincial Championship (WPC) came under severe threat after the NZRU announced that it would be shut down due to budget cuts. As the championship was a prime builder of training, skill and competition for New Zealand women's rugby, the decision was a shock for players and supporters, including former captain Farah Palmer – especially since it was a World Cup year.

While NZRU said women's domestic rugby was one of many victims of the tight financial times, they faced widespread criticism for their decision. After the Black Ferns' 2010 World Cup victory, the NZRU immediately apologised and reinstated the WPC, which was renamed the Farah Palmer Cup in 2016 in honour of the Black Ferns' influential former captain.

=== International competitions ===
The Black Ferns have won the Canada Cup in 1996, 2000, and 2005, and the Churchill Cup in 2004. From 2002 until their last game of 2009, the Black Ferns enjoyed a streak of 24 consecutive test match wins.

In 2018, after the success of the New Zealand women's national rugby sevens team, all Sevens and Black Ferns players have been offered semi-professional contracts. They also played the first test series against the Australian Wallaroos, which was played on the same night as the Men's Bledisloe Cup tests.

The 2018 season finished with a 1–1 drawn series against France, with France becoming only the fourth team in the world to beat the Black Ferns. The Black Ferns loss in the final game of the year ended a 17-month long winning streak and was also the final game for captain Fa’amausili, who retired from international rugby.

In 2019, the Black Ferns won the annual Women's Rugby Super Series for the second time. On 31 October 2021, the Black Ferns played their 100th test match against England in Exeter. They hosted the 2022 Pacific Four Series and won their first title after going undefeated in the series.

In 2022, New Zealand hosted the delayed 2021 Rugby World Cup after beating out neighbour Australia for the rights. New Zealand automatically qualified for the 2021 event as host. The Black Ferns successfully defended their title and claimed their sixth World Championship after beating England (34–31) in the final.

=== 2023 ===
The Black Ferns began 2023 with a new coach and a (50–0) thrashing of the Wallaroos in their first test of the year. The win saw them retain the O'Reilly Cup for another year and top the Pacific Four Series on points difference. Convincing wins against Canada (52–21) and the United States (39–17) in the rest of the series also added a second title to their acclaim.

New Zealand hosted the inaugural WXV 1 competition on 20 October 2023. They hosted Australia, Canada, England, France, and Wales in the top tier. France ended their 16-game winning streak in their opening match with a (17–18) score. A (70–7) drubbing of Wales saw them bounce back from their early defeat in their first test in Dunedin since 1997. A title-decider with England saw a rematch of the 2021 World Cup final. The Red Roses overpowered the Black Ferns (12–33) and went on to claim the inaugural WXV 1 title.

=== 2024 ===
In 2024, the Black Ferns started off their season by competing in the annual Pacific Four Series. They defeated the United States (57–0) and Australia (67–19) but lost to the eventual winners Canada (19–22) to finish the competition in second place. They also retained the O'Reilly Cup after demolishing the Wallaroos (62–0) in their second match. England beat the Black Ferns (12–24) before the start of the WXV 1. The Black ferns finished the WXV 1 competition in 4th place after defeats to Ireland (27–29) and England (31–49). They defeated France in their final match (39–14).

=== 2025 ===
The Black Ferns 2025 season commenced with participation in the 2025 Pacific Four Series. After defeating Australia (38–12) at McDonald Jones Stadium, Newcastle, on 10 May 2025 in their first match of the series, they drew with Canada (27–27) at Apollo Projects Stadium, Christchurch, on 17 May 2025. The Black Ferns' last draw was against England (8–8) in London in 2011.

After Canada defeated both the United States and Australia, the Black Ferns needed to defeat the United States by a 25-point margin to win the Pacific Four Series. They accomplished this in a clinical performance at North Harbour Stadium, Auckland, on 24 May 2025, winning (79–14). Seven of the 14 tries were scored by Portia Woodman. In doing so, Woodman became New Zealand's leading women's fifteen-a-side try scorer of all time with 45 tries from 26 tests, passing Vanessa Cootes record of 43 tries in 16 tests, which had stood since 2002.

On 6 July 2025, the Black Ferns faced the Black Ferns XV in a trial match in preparations for the World Cup and to give players a chance to stake a claim for the World Cup squad. They defeated the Black Ferns XV (45–12) in a dominant display. On 12 July 2025, the Black Ferns secured the Laurie O'Reilly Cup by defeating the Wallaroos (37–12) in their last test before the World Cup and their last game on home soil for the year.

In the 2025 Women's Rugby World Cup in England, the Black Ferns defeated Spain (54–8), Japan (62–19), and Ireland (40–0), to finish atop of their pool and advance to the playoffs. In the quarter-final, they defeated South Africa (46–17), but lost to eventual runners-up Canada in the semi-final (19–34). This was the Black Ferns first loss at the Rugby World Cup since they were defeated by Ireland in the pool stages of the 2014 Women's Rugby World Cup. They defeated France (42–26) in the bronze medal match to finish the tournament in third place.

On 19 December, Whitney Hansen was appointed as the new Black Ferns Head Coach through to the end of 2027.

== Haka ==
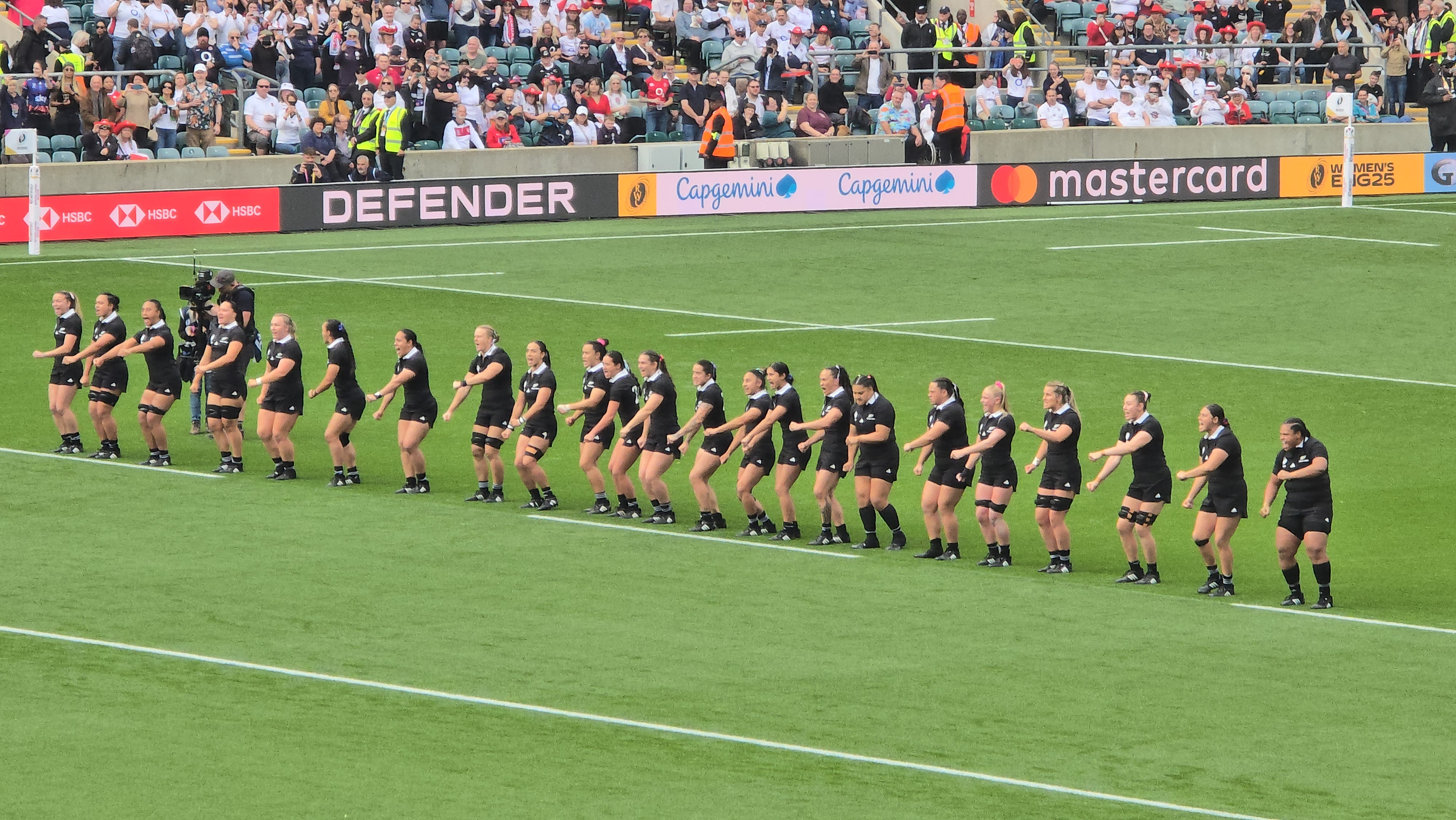
Haka performed by the Black Ferns.

The Black Ferns perform a haka (a Māori challenge) before every international match. The Black Ferns traditionally perform the haka Ko Uhia Mai, specially composed by the Māori rugby leader Te Whetū Tipiwai.

== Record ==
The first four games listed below – played at RugbyFest 1990 – are not generally accepted as being internationals by the New Zealand Rugby Union.

=== Overall ===
(Full internationals only, updated to 18 April 2026)

Rugby: New Zealand Internationals From 1991
Opponent	Played	Won	Lost	Drawn	Win%	For	Aga	Diff
Australia	29	29	0	0	100%	1,146	221	+925
Canada	21	18	2	1	86%	800	251	+549
England	33	19	13	1	57.58%	734	596	+138
France	13	8	5	0	61.54%	404	221	+183
Germany	2	2	0	0	100%	251	6	+245
Hong Kong	1	1	0	0	100%	121	0	+121
Ireland	4	2	2	0	50%	119	54	+65
Japan	2	2	0	0	100%	157	31	+126
Kazakhstan	1	1	0	0	100%	79	5	+74
Samoa	2	2	0	0	100%	140	12	+128
Scotland	4	4	0	0	100%	184	9	+175
South Africa	2	2	0	0	100%	101	20	+81
Spain	2	2	0	0	100%	100	11	+89
United States	16	15	1	0	93.75%	781	114	+667
Wales	7	7	0	0	100%	353	55	+298
World XV	2	2	0	0	100%	75	19	+56
Summary	141	116	23	2	82.26%	5,546	1,625	+3,921

=== Rugby World Cup ===
Rugby World Cup
Year	Round	Pld	W	D	L	PF	PA	Squad
(Wales) 1991	Third place*	3	2	0	1	48	21	Squad
(Scotland) 1994	Did not participate due to late tournament cancellation							
(Netherlands) 1998	Champions†	5	5	0	0	344	32	Squad
(Spain) 2002	Champions†	4	4	0	0	202	12	Squad
(Canada) 2006	Champions†	5	5	0	0	202	34	Squad
(England) 2010	Champions†	5	5	0	0	186	33	Squad
(France) 2014	Fifth place	5	4	0	1	245	37	Squad
(Ireland) 2017	Champions†	5	5	0	0	299	61	Squad
(New Zealand) 2021	Champions†	6	6	0	0	268	87	Squad
(England) 2025	Third place	6	5	0	1	263	104	Squad
(Australia) 2029	Qualified as 2025 Women's Rugby World Cup semi-finalists							
(United States) 2033	TBD							
Total	Champions^{†}	44	41	0	3	2,057	421	Squad
Champion Runner-up Third place Fourth place: * Tied placing ^{†} Best placing / Home venue

New Zealand have won the World Cup six times. They lost to eventual winners the United States in the semi-final of the inaugural competition held in Wales in 1991, but were absent from the following tournament in 1994, due to the late cancellation of the event. They defeated the United States in the final of the 1998 World Cup held in the Netherlands to claim their maiden title. They followed this up with three more consecutive titles, overcoming England in the final of the next three editions; 2002, 2006 and 2010, as well as in their fifth world title in 2017. They won their sixth World Title after defeating England (34–31) in the 2021 Rugby World Cup Grand Final. In the 2025 Women's Rugby World Cup, the Black Ferns were defeated by runners-up Canada in the semi final and finished the tournament in third place after defeating France in the bronze medal match.

In the 2014 Rugby World Cup, they lost a pool game to Ireland, while the top two teams in another pool drew their match. This saw them miss out on the semi-finals by a single table point, before going on to heavily defeat Wales and the United States to finish the tournament in fifth.

== Players ==
=== Current squad ===
Whitney Hansen named the Black Ferns' 31-player squad in August, for their historic end of year tour.

Player	Position	Date of birth (age)	Caps	Club/province
Vici-Rose Green	Hooker	4 August 2002 (aged 24)	12	(New Zealand) Waikato
Atlanta Lolohea	Hooker	16 April 2003 (aged 23)	14	(New Zealand) Canterbury
Georgia Ponsonby (cc)	Hooker	14 December 1999 (aged 26)	48	(New Zealand) Canterbury
Maddison Robinson	Prop	3 June 2001 (aged 25)	10	(New Zealand) Canterbury
Santo Taumata	Prop	5 February 2003 (aged 23)	14	(New Zealand) Bay of Plenty
Chryss Viliko	Prop	25 December 2000 (aged 25)	29	(New Zealand) Auckland
Ngano Tavake	Prop	10 July 2001 (aged 25)	3	(New Zealand) Manawatū
Veisinia Mahutariki-Fakalelu	Prop	24 November 2004 (aged 21)	14	(New Zealand) Waikato
Mo'omo'oga Palu	Prop	23 September 2001 (aged 25)	4	(New Zealand) Hawke's Bay
Laura Bayfield	Lock	5 March 1999 (aged 27)	15	(New Zealand) Canterbury
Amarante Sititi	Lock	24 August 2006 (aged 20)	4	(New Zealand) Auckland
Maia Roos	Lock	27 July 2001 (aged 25)	49	(New Zealand) Auckland
Ma'ama Mo'onia Vaipulu	Lock	26 November 2002 (aged 23)	18	(New Zealand) Auckland
Mia Anderson	Loose forward	4 March 2002 (aged 24)	8	(New Zealand) Waikato
Elinor-Plum King	Loose forward	1 June 2004 (aged 22)	7	(New Zealand) Manawatū
Liana Mikaele-Tu'u	Loose forward	2 March 2002 (aged 24)	46	(New Zealand) Auckland
Kaipo Olsen-Baker	Loose forward	1 May 2002 (aged 24)	23	(New Zealand) Manawatū
Layla Sae	Loose forward	22 October 1999 (aged 27)	24	(New Zealand) Manawatū
Maia Joseph	Half-back	20 May 2002 (aged 24)	27	(New Zealand) Otago
Tara Turner	Half-back	22 December 2003 (aged 22)	9	(New Zealand) Northland
Ruahei Demant (cc)	First five-eighth	21 April 1995 (aged 31)	59	(New Zealand) Auckland
Hannah King	First five-eighth	13 January 2004 (aged 22)	21	(New Zealand) Canterbury
Sylvia Brunt	Centre	1 January 2004 (aged 22)	40	(New Zealand) Auckland
Amy du Plessis	Centre	13 December 1998 (aged 27)	8	(New Zealand) Canterbury
Alena Saili	Centre	7 July 1999 (aged 27)	34	New Zealand 7s
Ayesha Leti-I'iga	Wing	3 January 1999 (aged 27)	39	(New Zealand) Wellington
Justine McGregor	Wing	11 April 2006 (aged 20)	8	New Zealand 7s
Mererangi Paul	Wing	29 October 1998 (aged 28)	24	(New Zealand) Counties Manukau
Shyrah Tuliau-Tua'a	Wing	30 August 2006 (aged 20)	6	(New Zealand) Waikato
Braxton Sorensen-McGee	Fullback	26 October 2006 (aged 20)	17	(New Zealand) Auckland
Maia Davis	Fullback	2 April 2006 (aged 20)	1	(New Zealand) Manawatū

=== Notable players ===
Four former Black Ferns have been inducted into the World Rugby Hall of Fame: Farah Palmer, Anna Richards, Huriana Manuel-Carpenter and Fiao'o Fa'amausili.

- Farah Palmer won three Women's Rugby World Cups, in 1998, 2002 and 2006. During her captaincy from 1997 to 2006, the Black Ferns lost only once. Palmer made her international debut against Australia in August 1996. She earned 35 caps, making her the fifth-most capped Black Ferns player. Palmer was awarded the IRB International Women's Personality of the Year in 2005. For the 5th Women's Rugby World Cup in Canada, Palmer fought her way back into the team and again led them to World Cup victory. After the win, she announced her retirement from the Black Ferns in September 2006. The national provincial women's competition in New Zealand is named in her honour in recognition of her contribution to the game. She was inducted into World Rugby's Hall of Fame in October 2014.
- Anna Richards was inducted into World Rugby's Hall of Fame in October 2014 along with Palmer. She won 49 caps for the Black Ferns in a career that spanned two decades, from 1990 to 2010. She played in the inaugural 1991 World Cup when New Zealand lost in the semi-finals. Richards is also a four-time Women's Rugby World Cup winner – 1998, 2002, 2006 and 2010; she played in every final.
- Huriana Manuel-Carpenter represented New Zealand in both sevens and 15s. In 2013, she captained the Black Ferns sevens side when they won the inaugural Women's Sevens Series title and the Sevens World Cup. She was also captain when the side successfully defended the series title in 2014. She won a silver medal at the Rio Olympic Games. Manuel-Carpenter is also a two-time Rugby World Cup winner – 2006 and 2010. Between 2005 and 2014 she scored 15 tries from 25 test appearances. She is part of the first mother-and-daughter duo to have played for the Black Ferns. She was inducted into World Rugby's Hall of Fame in October 2021.
- Fiao'o Fa'amausili was the most capped Black Fern at the time of her retirement in 2018. She recorded 50 wins from 58 games with 35 tests as captain. She scored 17 tries, the most by a forward, and won four World Cups out of the five that she has attended.

=== Award winners ===
The following New Zealand players have been recognised at the World Rugby Awards since 2001:

World Rugby Women's 15s Player of the Year
Year	Nominees	Winners
2002	Monique Hirovanaa	Monique Hirovanaa
2005	Farah Palmer	Farah Palmer
2006	Anna Richards	—
2010	Carla Hohepa	Carla Hohepa
2015	Kendra Cocksedge	Kendra Cocksedge
2016	Fiao'o Fa'amausili	—
2017	Portia Woodman	Portia Woodman
2019	Kendra Cocksedge (2)	—
2022	Ruahei Demant	Ruahei Demant
2022	Portia Woodman (2)	Ruahei Demant
2023	Ruahei Demant (2)	—
2025	Jorja Miller	—
2026	Kaipo Olsen-Baker	Kaipo Olsen-Baker

World Rugby Women's 15s Breakthrough Player of the Year
Year	Nominees	Winners
2022	Maia Roos	Ruby Tui
2022	Ruby Tui	Ruby Tui
2023	Mererangi Paul	Katelyn Vaha'akolo
2023	Katelyn Vaha'akolo	Katelyn Vaha'akolo
2024	Hannah King	—
2025	Jorja Miller	Braxton Sorensen-McGee
2025	Braxton Sorensen-McGee	Braxton Sorensen-McGee
2026	Elinor-Plum King	Elinor-Plum King

World Rugby Women's 15s Dream Team of the Year
Year	Forwards		Backs		Total
Year	No.	Players	No.	Players	Total
2021	—		13.	Stacey Fluhler	1
2022	—		10.	Ruahei Demant	4
2022	—		11.	Ruby Tui	4
2022	—		12.	Theresa Fitzpatrick	4
2022	—		14.	Portia Woodman	4
2023	1.	Krystal Murray	10.	Ruahei Demant (2)	6
2023	5.	Maia Roos	13.	Amy du Plessis	6
2023	8.	Liana Mikaele-Tu'u	14.	Ruby Tui (2)	6
2024	2.	Georgia Ponsonby	11.	Katelyn Vaha'akolo	3
2024	2.	Georgia Ponsonby	13.	Sylvia Brunt	3
2025	7.	Jorja Miller	12.	Sylvia Brunt (2)	4
2025	8.	Kaipo Olsen-Baker	14.	Braxton Sorensen-McGee	4
2026	5.	Maiakawanakaulani Roos (2)	11.	Ayesha Leti-I'iga	5
2026	8.	Kaipo Olsen-Baker (2)	12.	Sylvia Brunt (2)	5
2026	8.	Kaipo Olsen-Baker (2)	15.	Braxton Sorensen-McGee (2)	5

World Rugby Women's 15s Try of the Year
Year	Date	Nominee	Match	Tournament	Winner
2022	16 October	Sylvia Brunt	vs. Wales	Rugby World Cup	—
2023	8 July	Mererangi Paul	vs. Canada	Pacific Four Series	—
2024	25 May	Georgia Ponsonby	vs. Australia	Pacific Four Series	—
2025	7 September	Maia Joseph	vs. Ireland	Rugby World Cup	Maia Joseph

== Coaches ==
The following table lists every head coach of the Black Ferns, from 1991 to the present day. Every Black Ferns head coach has been a New Zealander.

Whitney Hansen is the most recent head coach, as of December 2025. Wayne Smith is the first and, to date, the only Black Ferns head coach to be named World Rugby Coach of the Year at the World Rugby Awards.

Updated to: 31 October 2026

Name	Years	Tests	Won	Lost	Drew	Win%
Laurie O'Reilly	1991	3	2	1	0	66.67%
Vicky Dombroski	1994–1995	2	2	0	0	100%
Darryl Suasua	1996–2002	23	22	1	0	95.65%
Jed Rowlands	2003–2006	15	15	0	0	100%
Dale Atkins	2007–2008	4	4	0	0	100%
Brian Evans (Note: Brian Evans took a break from coaching in 2011.)	2009–2010	7	6	1	0	85.71%
Grant Hansen	2011	3	0	2	1	66.67%
Brian Evans	2012–2014	15	11	4	0	73.33%
Greg Smith (Note: Greg Smith voluntarily stepped down as Black Ferns head coach without a single game.)	2015	0	0	0	0	0%
Glenn Moore	2015–2021	31	24	7	0	77.42%
Wayne Smith	2022	12	12	0	0	100%
Allan Bunting	2023–2025	25	17	7	1	68%
Whitney Hansen	2026–	11	10	1	0	90.91%
Total	1991–Present	151	125	24	2	82.78%

== See also ==
- List of women's international rugby union test matches – the most complete listing of all women's international results since 1982.
- List of New Zealand women's national rugby union team matches
- List of New Zealand women's national rugby union players
- List of New Zealand women's national rugby union team player records
