= List of New Zealand women's national rugby union players =

As of 23 October 2026, 277 players have played for the Black Ferns, New Zealand's national women's rugby union team. The Black Ferns played their first game in 1989 against a visiting Pacific Coast Grizzlies side from the United States at Christchurch's Lancaster Park. The "first" Black Fern was Jacquileen Apiata, which was decided by alphabetical order. The most recent Black Fern is Ngano Tavake — #277.

== List ==
Number	Name	Year of debut	Test caps	Total matches	Test points	Total points
1	Jacquileen Apiata	1989	5	16	0	18
2	Miriama Baker	1989	0	2	0	0
3	Tangaloa Edwards	1989	0	1	0	0
4	Lili Fa'aope	1989	0	3	0	0
5	Maree Fitzgibbon	1989	3	10	0	4
6	Debbie Ford	1989	0	5	0	4
7	Sue Garden-Bachop	1989	0	8	0	9
8	Nicky Inwood	1989	3	10	0	0
9	Helen Littleworth	1989	8	20	20	30
10	Helen Mahon-Stroud	1989	3	9	12	25
11	Ana Siafa	1989	0	1	0	0
12	Joanne Allan	1989	0	1	0	0
13	Christine Papali'i	1989	0	5	0	0
14	Christine Ross	1989	5	13	52	83
15	Nina Sio	1989	4	11	0	4
16	Carol Hayes	1989	0	6	0	0
17	Lise Baker	1990	0	3	0	0
18	Shona Ballinger	1990	0	3	0	0
19	Lesley Brett	1990	3	7	12	28
20	Florence Broughton	1989	0	1	0	0
21	Debbie Chase	1990	3	11	12	37
22	Donna Ewe	1990	3	10	0	0
23	Amanda Ford	1989	1	7	4	4
24	Seuga Frost	1990	0	3	0	0
25	Sandra Ioane	1990	0	4	0	0
26	Chris John	1990	0	1	0	0
27	Fiona Hunter	1990	0	2	0	0
28	Neroli Matautia	1990	4	6	0	0
29	Elsie Paitai	1990	0	5	0	8
30	Ericka Rere	1990	3	10	0	0
31	Anna Richards	1990	49	59	89	140
32	Jude Broughton	1990	0	1	0	0
33	Christine Rodd	1990	1	7	0	0
34	No'o Taru	1990	0	1	0	0
35	Kimi Tiriamai	1989	2	6	0	0
36	Tenia Vaeteru	1990	0	2	0	0
37	Julie Wharton	1990	0	2	0	0
38	Natasha Wong	1989	3	11	0	23
39	Anna Hopkins	1991	0	1	0	8
40	Tracy Lemon	1990	3	8	0	0
41	Geraldine Paul	1989	4	9	9	18
42	Cherry Blyde	1992	0	1	0	0
43	Mary Davie	1992	0	2	0	5
44	Lauren O'Reilly	1992	1	4	0	0
45	Rhonda Cobley	1992	0	2	0	0
46	Jude Ellis	1993	1	3	0	5
47	Sarah Huxford	1993	0	1	0	0
48	Pauline O'Leary	1993	0	1	0	5
49	Heidi Reader	1993	3	5	38	63
50	Vivian Rees	1993	2	5	20	22
51	Davida White	1993	13	15	10	10
52	Julie Reynolds	1993	0	2	0	0
53	Fiona Richards	1993	14	17	0	0
54	Leanne Atkins	1994	0	1	17	0
55	Eva Epiha	1994	0	1	0	0
56	Monique Hirovanaa	1994	24	26	65	90
57	Rochelle Martin	1994	32	34	70	70
58	Regina Sheck	1994	25	26	25	25
59	Louisa Wall	1994	15	16	95	115
60	Liza Mihinui	1994	0	1	0	0
61	Lenadeen Simpson	1994	8	9	15	20
62	Tasha Williams	1990	1	3	10	15
63	Vanessa Cootes	1995	16	16	215	215
64	Florence Tamihana	1995	1	1	0	0
65	Tracey Waters	1995	10	10	5	5
66	Shannon Rex	1996	2	2	0	0
67	Kellie Kiwi	1996	8	8	15	15
68	Farah Palmer	1996	35	35	25	25
69	Melodie Robinson	1996	18	18	20	20
70	Sayonara Su'a	1996	2	2	5	5
71	Bella Tahu	1996	3	3	0	0
72	Karen Taylor	1996	2	2	5	5
73	Emma Thomas	1996	9	9	0	0
74	Janet Heenan	1996	5	5	0	0
75	Fiona King	1996	18	18	5	5
76	Annaleah Rush	1996	20	20	152	152
77	Riki Hiemer	1997	2	2	0	0
78	Mel Kupa	1997	2	2	0	0
79	Suzy Shortland	1997	18	18	20	20
80	Cheryl Waaka	1997	20	20	35	35
81	Vicki Cunningham	1997	1	1	0	0
82	Jacinta Nielsen	1997	7	7	0	0
83	Monalisa Codling	1998	30	30	25	25
84	Dianne Kahura	1998	12	12	95	95
85	Tammi Wilson	1998	16	16	193	193
86	Maree Edwards	1998	4	4	5	5
87	Toni Konui	1998	4	4	0	0
88	Brigitta Lotu-Iiga	1998	5	5	0	0
89	Exia Shelford	1998	27	27	90	90
90	Mata Piho	1998	3	3	0	0
91	Sarah Persico	1999	2	2	0	0
92	Adrienne Lili'i	1999	12	12	5	5
93	Rebecca Liua'ana	1999	10	10	10	10
94	Suzy Dawson	1999	4	4	5	5
95	Izzy Ford	1999	5	5	5	5
96	Victoria Heighway	2000	32	32	10	10
97	Margaret McKenzie	2000	5	5	5	5
98	Rhonda Kay	2000	1	1	0	0
99	Amiria Rule	2000	33	34	75	75
100	Tala Mulipola	2000	7	7	5	5
101	Hannah Porter	2000	22	22	166	166
102	Tia Paasi	2001	4	4	0	0
103	Tamaku Paul	2001	1	1	0	0
104	Sandy Yates	2001	1	1	0	0
105	Casey Robertson	2002	38	38	10	10
106	Helen Va'aga	2002	11	11	5	5
107	Emma Jensen	2002	49	50	58	58
108	Fiao'o Fa'amausili	2002	58	58	85	85
109	Linda Itunu	2003	38	39	5	5
110	Mere Kingi	2003	5	5	10	10
111	Claire Richardson	2003	24	24	54	54
112	Stacey Lene	2003	7	7	35	35
113	Erin Rush	2003	2	2	0	0
114	Stephanie Mortimer	2003	12	12	50	50
115	Vania Wolfgramm	2003	4	4	0	0
116	Lauren Engebretsen	2004	3	3	0	0
117	Justine Lavea	2004	34	35	20	20
118	Aroha Lam	2004	3	3	0	0
119	Melodie Bosman	2004	17	17	0	0
120	Melissa Ruscoe	2004	22	22	32	32
121	Rebecca Mahoney	2004	19	19	25	25
122	Marina Canterbury	2005	5	5	10	10
123	Kamila Wihongi	2005	1	1	0	0
124	Shannon Willoughby	2005	9	9	0	0
125	Catherine de Jong	2005	2	2	0	0
126	Huriana Manuel	2005	26	27	70	75
127	Karina Stowers	2005	17	18	0	0
128	Joan Sione	2005	6	6	5	5
129	Nicole Borthwick	2005	2	2	7	7
130	Amy Williams	2005	8	8	0	0
131	Diane Maliukaetau	2005	6	6	5	5
132	Kimberly Smith	2005	12	13	0	0
133	Pikihuia Ruffell	2005	2	2	10	10
134	Waimania Teddy	2005	7	7	0	0
135	Victoria Grant	2006	17	18	30	30
136	Rachel Makata	2006	2	2	5	5
137	Beth Mallard	2006	8	9	0	5
138	Carla Hohepa	2007	28	29	95	105
139	Anika Tiplady	2007	2	3	0	18
140	Kathleen Wilton	2007	17	17	0	0
141	Fa'anati Aniseko	2007	2	2	5	5
142	Kendra Cocksedge	2007	68	71	388	404
143	Ruth McKay	2007	26	26	0	0
144	Vita Robinson	2007	14	15	0	0
145	Aimee Sutorius	2007	3	4	0	0
146	Teresa Te Tamaki	2007	10	10	0	0
147	Amy Farr	2007	1	1	0	0
148	Olivia Coady	2008	4	5	5	5
149	Halie Tiplady-Hurring	2008	12	12	15	15
150	Stephanie Te Ohaere-Fox	2008	24	25	0	0
151	Doris Taufateau	2008	5	5	0	0
152	Selica Winiata	2008	40	41	195	195
153	Kelly Brazier	2009	44	45	190	195
154	Barbara Chittock	2009	0	1	0	0
155	Amanda Murphy	2009	2	3	0	0
156	Claire Rowat	2009	0	1	0	0
157	Renee Wickliffe	2009	46	47	120	120
158	Trish Hina	2010	4	4	0	0
159	Aroha Savage	2010	33	35	20	20
160	Shakira Baker	2011	13	13	0	0
161	Eloise Blackwell	2011	46	48	55	55
162	Rawinia Everitt	2011	21	21	25	25
163	Hazel Tubic	2011	22	24	19	21
164	Lydia Crossman	2011	5	5	0	0
165	Kelani Matapo	2011	1	1	0	0
166	Kat Whata-Simpkins	2011	1	1	0	0
167	Muteremoana Aiatu	2011	1	1	0	0
168	Victoria Subritzky-Nafatali	2012	19	19	30	30
169	Aleisha-Pearl Nelson	2012	38	40	10	10
170	Jackie Patea-Fereti	2012	18	18	0	0
171	Zoey Berry	2012	1	1	0	0
172	Portia Woodman	2013	34	34	250	250
173	Chelsea Semple	2013	29	31	27	27
174	Charmaine McMenamin	2013	31	33	20	20
175	Onjeurlina Leiataua	2013	1	1	0	0
176	Honey Hireme	2014	18	18	75	75
177	Sanita Levave	2014	5	5	0	0
178	Te Kura Ngata-Aerengamate	2014	32	34	10	15
179	Phillipa Love	2014	28	29	10	20
180	Charlene Halapua	2015	9	9	5	5
181	Toka Natua	2015	22	24	25	25
182	Charmaine Smith	2015	27	27	20	20
183	Stacey Fluhler	2015	32	32	65	65
184	Janna Vaughan	2015	6	6	10	10
185	Angie Sisifa	2015	7	7	0	0
186	Aldora Itunu	2015	24	26	30	30
187	Kiritapu Demant	2015	2	2	0	0
188	Les Elder	2015	22	22	10	10
189	Sarah Hirini	2016	17	17	20	20
190	Aotearoa Mata'u	2016	8	8	5	5
191	Kristina Sue	2016	14	14	0	0
192	Sharnita Woodman	2016	2	2	0	0
193	Sosoli Talawadua	2016	8	8	5	5
194	Theresa Fitzpatrick	2017	25	25	40	40
195	Becky Wood	2017	8	8	0	0
196	Ruahei Demant	2018	59	59	148	148
197	Alena Saili	2018	8	8	0	0
198	Leilani Perese	2018	12	12	0	0
199	Krysten Cottrell	2018	8	8	0	0
200	Cristo Tofa	2018	2	3	0	0
201	Ayesha Leti-I'iga	2018	39	39	135	135
202	Monica Tagoai	2018	4	4	0	0
203	Marcelle Parkes	2018	5	5	0	0
204	Natahlia Moors	2018	2	3	5	5
205	Pia Tapsell	2019	6	7	5	5
206	Karli Faneva	2019	2	2	0	0
207	Luka Connor	2019	16	18	30	30
208	Arihiana Marino-Tauhinu	2019	15	17	12	12
209	Joanah Ngan-Woo	2019	19	19	20	20
210	Kennedy Simon	2019	16	18	5	5
211	Forne Burkin	2019	2	2	0	0
212	Kilisitina Moata'ane	2019	1	1	0	0
213	Olivia Ward-Duin	2019	2	2	0	0
214	Grace Brooker	2019	4	5	0	5
215	Cheyelle Robins-Reti	2020	5	6	0	5
216	Langi Veainu	2020	0	2	0	10
217	Kelsie Wills	2020	2	4	0	5
218	Chelsea Bremner	2020	24	26	15	15
219	Amy du Plessis	2020	34	34	65	65
220	Kendra Reynolds	2020	12	13	0	0
221	Renee Holmes	2020	32	32	255	255
222	Grace Steinmetz	2020	2	3	0	0
223	Alana Bremner	2021	35	35	25	25
224	Dhys Faleafaga	2021	3	3	0	0
225	Grace Houpapa-Barrett	2021	3	3	0	0
226	Krystal Murray	2021	14	14	15	15
227	Liana Mikaele-Tu'u	2021	46	46	40	40
228	Ariana Bayler	2021	10	10	0	0
229	Patricia Maliepo	2021	3	3	2	2
230	Amy Rule	2021	35	35	10	10
231	Maiakawanakaulani Roos	2021	49	49	20	20
232	Georgia Ponsonby	2021	48	48	30	30
233	Kaipo Olsen-Baker	2022	23	23	50	50
234	Kelsey Teneti	2022	3	3	5	5
235	Ruby Tui	2022	20	20	75	75
236	Angel Mulu	2022	2	2	0	0
237	Tanya Kalounivale	2022	28	28	15	15
238	Tafito Lafaele	2022	3	3	0	0
239	Sylvia Brunt	2022	40	40	65	65
240	Natalie Delamere	2022	3	3	0	0
241	Lucy Anderson	2022	1	1	0	0
242	Tyla Nathan-Wong	2022	1	1	0	0
243	Awhina Tangen-Wainohu	2022	10	10	5	5
244	Santo Taumata	2022	14	14	0	0
245	Kate Henwood	2023	2	2	0	0
246	Mererangi Paul	2023	23	23	115	115
247	Katelyn Vaha'akolo	2023	20	20	125	125
248	Iritana Hohaia	2023	19	19	5	5
249	Rosie Kelly	2023	4	4	2	2
250	Tenika Willison	2023	2	2	2	2
251	Lucy Jenkins	2023	8	8	15	15
252	Esther Faiaoga-Tilo	2023	1	1	0	0
253	Grace Gago	2023	1	1	5	5
254	Chryss Viliko	2023	29	29	25	25
255	Martha Mataele	2023	2	2	5	5
256	Layla Sae	2023	24	24	20	20
257	Sophie Fisher	2023	2	2	0	0
258	Maia Joseph	2024	27	27	25	25
259	Ma'ama Mo'onia Vaipulu	2024	18	18	25	25
260	Hannah King	2024	21	21	31	31
261	Atlanta Lolohea	2024	14	14	10	10
262	Braxton Sorensen-McGee	2025	19	19	185	185
263	Veisinia Mahutariki-Fakalelu	2025	14	14	5	5
264	Jorja Miller	2025	7	7	25	25
265	Risi Pouri-Lane	2025	7	7	5	5
266	Vici-Rose Green	2025	12	12	10	10
267	Laura Bayfield	2025	15	15	10	10
268	Mia Anderson	2026	8	8	5	5
269	Tara Turner	2026	9	9	5	5
270	Justine McGregor	2026	8	8	15	15
271	Maddi Robinson	2026	10	10	5	5
272	Mo'omo'oga Palu	2026	4	4	5	5
273	Elinor-Plum King	2026	7	7	15	15
274	Shyrah Tuliau-Tua'a	2026	6	6	40	40
275	Amarante Sititi	2026	4	4	20	20
276	Maia Davis	2026	1	1	0	0
277	Ngano Tavake	2026	3	3	0	0
