= 2011 end-of-year women's rugby union tests =

The 2011 end of year women's rugby tests was a series of women's rugby union matches. New Zealand toured the Northern Hemisphere, according to a three-year international test agreement signed between RFU and NZRU in August 2011: England would host three tests in the autumn of 2011 and 2012 before heading to New Zealand for three further matches in June 2013, just a year before the 2014 Women's Rugby World Cup.

Before competing with the world champions New Zealand, England played against France twice: the first game wasn't an uncapped match, while the second was a full international test. France also contested a game with Italy.

Scotland travelled to Amsterdam to take on the Netherlands after finishing last at this year's Six Nations.

That was the largest round of autumn women's rugby internationals ever seen in the game at this time of year, especially in Europe.

== France vs Italy ==
29 October 2011

France	37 - 0	Italy
Tries: Chloé Pelle 12'; Marine De Nadaï 28'; Laëtitia Salles 38'; Laure Rodriguez 47'; Marjorie Mayans 72'; Cyrielle Bouisset 80’ Cons: Jessy Trémoulière 28', 38'; Pen: Sandrine Agricole 18'

Stade des Arboras, Nice, Alpes-Maritimes
Referee: Christine Bigaran (France)

FRANCE:
FB	15	Clémence Rousseau
RW	14	Läurelin Fourcade
OC	13	Audrey Annastassiadis	(substituted off) 65'
IC	12	Sandrine Agricole
LW	11	Chloé Pelle
FH	10	Jessy Trémoulière	(substituted off) 60'
SH	9	Marie-Alice Yahé (C)	(substituted off) 50'
N8	8	Sandra Rabier	(substituted off) 55'
OF	7	Amandine Chatelier
BF	6	Laure Rodriguez
RL	5	Marine De Nadaï	(substituted off) 55'
LL	4	Elodie Mert
TP	3	Emeline Dupont	(substituted off) 60'
HK	2	Laëtitia Salles	(substituted off) 65'
LP	1	Lise Arricastre	(substituted off) 26' (substituted in) 40'
Replacements:
HK	16	Gaëlle Mignot	(substituted in) 65'
PR	17	Christelle Chobet	(substituted in) 26' (substituted off) 40' (substituted in) 60'
LK	18	Cyrielle Bouisset	(substituted in) 55'
FL	19	Claire Canal	(substituted in) 55'
CE	20	Marjorie Mayans	(substituted in) 65'
FH	21	Aurélie Bailon	(substituted in) 60'
SH	22	Jennifer Troncy	(substituted in) 50'
Coach:
(France) Christian Galonnier

ITALY:
FB	15	Manuela Furlan
RW	14	Sofia Stefan	(substituted in) 41'
OC	13	Maria Grazia Cioffi
IC	12	Samantha Pagli	(substituted in) 41'
LW	11	Sara Barattin
FH	10	Veronica Schiavon (C)
SH	9	Vanessa Chindamo	(substituted off) 41'
N8	8	Flavia Severin
OF	7	Cecilia Zublena	(substituted off) 41'
BF	6	Elisa Giordano	(substituted off) 41'
RL	5	Valentina Ruzza	(substituted off) 41'
LL	4	Sara Pettinelli
TP	3	Germana Raponi	(substituted off) 41' (substituted in) 75'
HK	2	Debora Ballarini
LP	1	Anita Nespoli	(substituted off) 75'
Replacements:
PR	16	Lucia Gai	(substituted in) 41'
LK	17	Alice Trevisan	(substituted in) 41'
FL	18	Maria Chiara Nespoli	(substituted in) 41'
FL	19	Cristina Molic	(substituted in) 41'
FH	20	Michela Tondinelli	(substituted in) 41'
CE	21	Elisa Rochas	(substituted in) 41'
CE	22	Paola Zangirolami	(substituted in) 41'
Coach:
(Italy) Andrea Di Giandomenico

Assistant referees:
n/a
n/a
Assessor:
n/a

== France vs England (unofficial) ==
2 November 2011

France	14 - 5	England
Tries: Assa Koïta 64'; Penalty try 73'; Cons: Jessy Trémoulière 64', 73'		Try: Lydia Thompson 46'

Stade Jean Bouin, Marseille, Bouches-du-Rhône
Referee: Eric Lavit (France)

FRANCE:
FB	15	Jessy Trémoulière
RW	14	Anaïs Poirot	(substituted off) 55'
OC	13	Laura Di Muzio
IC	12	Audrey Annastassiadis	(substituted off) 41'
LW	11	Dioni Aguerre
FH	10	Aurélie Bailon
SH	9	Jennifer Troncy (C)	(substituted off) 65'
N8	8	Audrey Forlani
OF	7	Manon André
BF	6	Claire Canal	(substituted off) 45'
RL	5	Assa Koïta
LL	4	Elodie Mert	(substituted off) 57'
TP	3	Elodie Portaries	(substituted off) 45'
HK	2	Gaëlle Mignot
LP	1	Hélène Ezanno	(substituted off) 41'
Replacements:
HK	16	Lise Arricastre	(substituted in) 41'
PR	17	Emeline Dupont	(substituted in) 45'
LK	18	Cyrielle Bouisset	(substituted in) 57'
FL	19	Sandra Rabier	(substituted in) 45'
WG	20	Chloé Pelle	(substituted in) 55'
CE	21	Marjorie Mayans	(substituted in) 41'
SH	22	Marie-Alice Yahé	(substituted in) 65'
Coach:
(France) Christian Galonnier

ENGLAND:
FB	15	Kay Wilson
RW	14	Katherine Merchant
OC	13	Michaela Staniford
IC	12	Kimberley Oliver	(substituted off) 41'
LW	11	Lydia Thompson	(yellow card) 65' to 75'
FH	10	Ceri Large
SH	9	Natasha Hunt	(substituted off) 41'
N8	8	Sarah Hunter (C)	(substituted off) 41'
OF	7	Hannah Gallagher
BF	6	Alexandra Matthews	(substituted off) 41'
RL	5	Rowena Burnfiled
LL	4	Harriet Millar-Mills
TP	3	Rosemarie Crowley
HK	2	Amy Turner	(substituted off) 41'
LP	1	Rochelle Clark	(substituted off) 41'
Replacements:
HK	16	Victoria Fleetwood	(substituted in) 41'
PR	17	Laura Keates	(substituted in) 41'
LK	18	Tamara Taylor	(substituted in) 41'
FL	19	Isabelle Noel-Smith	(substituted in) 41'
SH	20	Rose Jay	(substituted in) 41'
FH	21	Sarah McKenna	(substituted in) 41'
CE	22	Emily Scarratt
Coach:
(England) Gary Street

Assistant referees:
Hugo Joly (France)
Frédéric Saunier (France)
Assessor:
n/a

== France vs England ==
5 November 2011

France	16 - 15	England
Try: Läurelin Fourcade 68'; Con: Aurélie Bailon 68'; Pens: Aurélie Bailon 11', 26', 52'		Tries: Alexandra Matthews 4'; Michaela Staniford 45'; Con: Emily Scarratt 4'; Pen: Emily Scarratt 56'

Stade Pierre de Coubertin, Châteaurenard, Bouches-du-Rhône
Referee: n/a

FRANCE:
FB	15	Jessy Trémoulière
RW	14	Läurelin Fourcade
OC	13	Marjorie Mayans
IC	12	Laura Di Muzio	(substituted off) 50'
LW	11	Dioni Aguerre	(substituted off) 72'
FH	10	Aurélie Bailon
SH	9	Marie-Alice Yahé (C)	(substituted off) 65'
N8	8	Claire Canal
OF	7	Laure Rodriguez	(substituted off) 41'
BF	6	Amandine Chatelier
RL	5	Cyrielle Bouisset
LL	4	Marine De Nadaï	(substituted off) 65'
TP	3	Christelle Chobet
HK	2	Laëtitia Salles	(substituted off) 55'
LP	1	Hélène Ezanno	(substituted off) 33'
Replacements:
HK	16	Gaëlle Mignot	(substituted in) 55'
PR	17	Elodie Portaries	(substituted in) 33'
LK	18	Assa Koïta	(substituted in) 65'
FL	19	Audrey Forlani	(substituted in) 41'
SH	20	Jennifer Troncy	(substituted in) 65'
CE	21	Sandrine Agricole	(substituted in) 50'
WG	22	Chloé Pelle	(substituted in) 72'
Coach:
(France) Christian Galonnier

ENGLAND:
FB	15	Kay Wilson
RW	14	Katherine Merchant
OC	13	Georgina Roberts	(substituted off) 72'
IC	12	Emily Scarratt
LW	11	Michaela Staniford
FH	10	Kimberley Oliver
SH	9	La Toya Mason	(substituted off) 41'
N8	8	Sarah Hunter (C)
OF	7	Marlie Packer	(substituted off) 59'
BF	6	Alexandra Matthews	(substituted off) 59'
RL	5	Rowena Burnfield	(substituted off) 72'
LL	4	Tamara Taylor
TP	3	Laura Keates	(substituted off) 55'
HK	2	Victoria Fleetwood	(substituted off) 41'
LP	1	Rochelle Clark
Replacements:
HK	16	Amy Turner	(substituted in) 41'
PR	17	Rosemary Crowley	(substituted in) 55'
LK	18	Harriet Millar-Mills	(substituted in) 72'
FL	19	Hannah Gallagher	(substituted in) 59'
FL	20	Isabelle Noel-Smith	(substituted in) 59'
SH	21	Natasha Hunt	(substituted in) 41'
FH	22	Ceri Large	(substituted in) 72'
Coach:
(England) Gary Street

Assistant referees:
n/a
n/a
Assessor:
n/a

== Netherlands vs Scotland ==
6 November 2011

Netherlands	10 - 33	Scotland
Tries: Yasmin Gunner 14' xandra benthem de grave 80'		Tries: Sarah Dixon 3'; Stephanie Johnston 19', 44'; Lauren Harris 30', 51'; Con: Caroline Collie 30'; Pens: Caroline Collie 14', 36'

Sportpark De Eendracht, Amsterdam
Referee: Clare Daniels (England)

NETHERLANDS:
FB	15	Elisabeth Geertsema
RW	14	Alexia Mavroudis
OC	13	Lyske Vand der Brug
IC	12	Carin Van der Heiden	(substituted off) 41'
LW	11	Fenna Stomps	(substituted off) 41'
FH	10	Anita Clarke
SH	9	Giselle Kleinen
N8	8	Shereza Pool
OF	7	Yasmin Gunner
BF	6	Yael Belder	(substituted off) 64'
RL	5	Asia Udding
LL	4	Selina Tukker	(substituted off) 41'
TP	3	Sylke Haverkorn
HK	2	Eva Van Asseldonk	(substituted off) 41'
LP	1	Xandra Benthem de Grave (C)
Replacements:
HK	16	Hadewijch Van Hilten	(substituted in) 41'
PR	17	Nicole Misseldine
LK	18	Sarah Toll	(substituted in) 41'
FL	19	Maaike Loth	(substituted in) 64'
CE	20	Roos Van Beurden	(substituted in) 41'
WG	21	Mae-Ling Stuyt	(substituted in) 41'
FB	22	Irith Lely
Coach:
(Netherlands) Yvonne Bouman

SCOTLAND:
FB	15	Stephanie Johnston
RW	14	Lauren Harris	(substituted off) 68'
OC	13	Caroline Collie	(substituted off) 58'
IC	12	Laura Steven
LW	11	Sarah Dixon
FH	10	Lisa Scott-Ritchie
SH	9	Sarah Sexton
N8	8	Lindsay Wheeler
OF	7	Ruth Slaven	(substituted off) 72'
BF	6	Charlotte Veale	(substituted off) 52'
RL	5	Anna Swan
LL	4	Katherine Muir	(substituted off) 52'
TP	3	Tracy Balmer (C)
HK	2	Sarah Quick	(substituted off) 68'
LP	1	Heather Lockhart	(substituted off) 60'
Replacements:
HK	16	Alison MacDonald	(substituted in) 68'
PR	17	Suzanne McKerlie-Hex	(substituted in) 60'
LK	18	Jemma Forsyth	(substituted in) 52'
FL	19	Lana Skeldon	(substituted in) 52'
FL	20	Therese Forsberg	(substituted in) 72'
CE	21	Katy Green	(substituted in) 58'
WG	22	Megan Gaffney	(substituted in) 68'
Coach:
(Scotland) Karen Findlay

Assistant referees:
Gert Visser (Netherlands)
Darron Wadey (Netherlands)
Assessor:
Thomas Muldoon (Netherlands)

== England vs New Zealand (1st match) ==
26 November 2011

England	10 - 0	New Zealand
Try: Margaret Alphonsi 30'; Con: Katy McLean 30'; Drop: Katy McLean 58'

Twickenham, London
Referee: Steve Lee (England)

ENGLAND:
FB	15	Danielle Waterman	(substituted off) 47'
RW	14	Katherine Merchant
OC	13	Emily Scarratt
IC	12	Kimberley Oliver	(substituted off) 51'
LW	11	Michaela Staniford
FH	10	Katy McLean (C)
SH	9	La Toya Mason	(substituted off) 55'
N8	8	Sarah Hunter
OF	7	Margaret Alphonsi	(substituted off) 58'
BF	6	Rebecca Essex	(substituted off) 58'
RL	5	Tamara Taylor
LL	4	Rowena Burnfield
TP	3	Sophie Hemming
HK	2	Victoria Fleetwood	(substituted off) 55'
LP	1	Rochelle Clark	(substituted off) 55'
Replacements:
HK	16	Amy Turner	(substituted in) 55'
PR	17	Laura Keates	(substituted in) 55'
FL	18	Marlie Packer	(substituted in) 58'
FL	19	Alexandra Matthews	(substituted in) 78'
SH	20	Natasha Hunt	(substituted in) 55'
CE	21	Rachael Burford	(substituted in) 51'
FB	22	Kay Wilson	(substituted in) 47'
Coach:
(England) Gary Street

NEW ZEALAND:
FB	15	Victoria Grant (C)	(substituted off) ??'
RW	14	Shakira Baker
OC	13	Kelly Brazier
IC	12	Amiria Rule
LW	11	Renee Wickliffe
FH	10	Rebecca Mahoney	(substituted off) ??'
SH	9	Emma Jensen	(substituted off) ??'
N8	8	Casey Robertson
OF	7	Justine Lavea
BF	6	Amanda Murphy	(substituted off) ??'
RL	5	Eloise Blackwell	(substituted off) ??'
LL	4	Vita Robinson
TP	3	Melodie Bosman
HK	2	Fiao'o Fa'amausili
LP	1	Kathleen Wilton	(substituted off) ??'
Replacements:
HK	16	Karina Penetito
PR	17	Doris Taufateau	(substituted in) ??'
LK	18	Rawinia Everitt	(substituted in) ??'
FL	19	Aroha Savage	(substituted in) ??'
SH	20	Kendra Cocksedge	(substituted in) ??'
CE	21	Teresa Te Tamaki	(substituted in) ??'
FB	22	Hazel Tubic	(substituted in) ??'
Coach:
(New Zealand) Grant Hansen

Assistant referees:
Clare Daniels (England)
Darryl Chapman (England)
Assessor:
Bob Ockenden (England)

== England vs New Zealand (2nd match) ==
29 November 2011

England	21 - 7	New Zealand
Tries: Georgina Roberts 9'; Katy McLean 47'; Victoria Fleetwood 68'; Pens: Katy McLean 2', 36'		Try: Justine Lavea 21'; Con: Kelly Brazier 21'

Molesey Road, Esher, Surrey
Referee: Philip Davies (England)

ENGLAND:
FB	15	Kay Wilson
RW	14	Georgina Roberts	(substituted off) 52'
OC	13	Rachael Burford
IC	12	Kimberley Oliver	(yellow card) 57' to 67'
LW	11	Michaela Staniford	(substituted off) 69'
FH	10	Katy McLean (C)
SH	9	Natasha Hunt	(yellow card) 75' to +80'
N8	8	Alexandra Matthews
OF	7	Marlie Packer
BF	6	Hannah Gallagher	(substituted off) 60'
RL	5	Tamara Taylor
LL	4	Rebecca Essex	(substituted off) 57'
TP	3	Laura Keates	(substituted off) 64'
HK	2	Amy Turner	(substituted off) 52'
LP	1	Claire Purdy
Replacements:
HK	16	Victoria Fleetwood	(substituted in) 52'
PR	17	Sophie Hemming	(substituted in) 64'
LK	18	Rowena Burnfield	(substituted in) 57'
FL	19	Margaret Alphonsi	(substituted in) 60'
SH	20	La Toya Mason
CE	21	Emily Scarratt	(substituted in) 69'
WG	22	Katherine Merchant	(substituted in) 52'
Coach:
(England) Gary Street

NEW ZEALAND:
FB	15	Kelly Brazier
RW	14	Katarina Whata-Simpkins
OC	13	Shakira Baker
IC	12	Amiria Rule	(substituted off) 53'
LW	11	Renee Wickliffe
FH	10	Rebecca Mahoney	(substituted off) 56'
SH	9	Kendra Cocksedge	(substituted off) 66'
N8	8	Casey Robertson (C)
OF	7	Justine Lavea
BF	6	Lydia Crossman	(substituted off) 58'
RL	5	Kelani Matapo	(substituted off) 46'
LL	4	Vita Robinson	(yellow card) 35' to 45'
TP	3	Melodie Bosman	(substituted off) 48'
HK	2	Karina Penetito
LP	1	Kathleen Wilton	(substituted off) 60'
Replacements:
HK	16	Stephanie Te Ohaere-Fox	(substituted in) 48'
PR	17	Muteremoana Aiatu	(substituted in) 60'
LK	18	Eloise Blackwell	(substituted in) 46'
FL	19	Aroha Savage	(substituted in) 58'
SH	20	Emma Jensen	(substituted in) 66'
CE	21	Teresa Te Tamaki	(substituted in) 53'
FB	22	Hazel Tubic	(substituted in) 56'
Coach:
(New Zealand) Grant Hansen

Assistant referees:
Paul Kimber (England)
Ken Morgan (England)
Assessor:
David Warren (England)

== England vs New Zealand (3rd match) ==
3 December 2011

England	8 - 8	New Zealand
Try: Natasha Hunt 51'; Pen: Katy McLean 6'		Try: Renee Wickcliffe 12'; Pen: Kelly Brazier 33'

Molesey Road, Esher, Surrey
Referee: Ross Campbell (England)

ENGLAND:
FB	15	Emily Scarratt
RW	14	Katherine Merchant
OC	13	Rachael Burford
IC	12	Alice Richardson	(substituted off) 30'
LW	11	Kay Wilson
FH	10	Katy McLean (C)
SH	9	La Toya Mason	(substituted off) 41'
N8	8	Sarah Hunter
OF	7	Margaret Alphonsi
BF	6	Alexandra Matthews	(substituted off) 41'
RL	5	Tamara Taylor
LL	4	Rebecca Essex	(substituted off) 63'
TP	3	Sophie Hemming
HK	2	Amy Turner	(substituted off) 41'
LP	1	Claire Purdy	(substituted off) 48'
Replacements:
HK	16	Victoria Fleetwood	(substituted in) 41'
PR	17	Laura Keates	(substituted in) 48'
LK	18	Rowena Burnfield	(substituted in) 63'
FL	19	Marlie Packer	(substituted in) 41'
SH	20	Natasha Hunt	(substituted in) 41'
	21	Kimberley Oliver	(substituted in) 30'
	22	Georgina Roberts
Coach:
(England) Gary Street

NEW ZEALAND:
FB	15	Hazel Tubic	(yellow card) 27' to 37'
RW	14	Victoria Grant (C)
OC	13	Shakira Baker	(substituted off) 41'
IC	12	Teresa Te Tamaki
LW	11	Renee Wickliffe
FH	10	Kelly Brazier
SH	9	Kendra Cocksedge	(substituted off) 60'
N8	8	Casey Robertson
OF	7	Justine Lavea
BF	6	Lydia Crossman	(yellow card) 45' to 55' (substituted off) 68'
RL	5	Eloise Blackwell
LL	4	Vita Robinson	(substituted off) 68'
TP	3	Stephanie Te Ohaere-Fox
HK	2	Karina Penetito
LP	1	Kathleen Wilton
Replacements:
PR	16	Doris Taufateau
HK	17	Muteremoana Aiatu
LK	18	Amanda Murphy	(substituted in) 68'
FL	19	Rawinia Everitt	(substituted in) 68'
SH	20	Emma Jensen	(substituted in) 60'
FH	21	Rebecca Mahoney	(substituted in) 41'
WG	22	Katarina Whata-Simpkins
Coach:
(New Zealand) Grant Hansen

Assistant referees:
Ed Turnill (England)
Peter Crouch (England)
Assessor:
Geoff Blackburn (England)
