= 2007 Laurie O'Reilly Cup =

Tournament details
- Date: 16–20 October 2007
- Countries: Australia; New Zealand
- Teams: 2

Final positions
- Champions: New Zealand

Tournament statistics
- Matches played: 2
- Tries scored: 11 (5.5 per match)
- Top scorer(s): Carla Hohepa (25 points)
- Most tries: Carla Hohepa (5 tries)

The 2007 Laurie O'Reilly Cup was the sixth edition of the competition and was held between 16 and 20 October at New Zealand. New Zealand retained the O'Reilly Cup after winning both matches.

The Wallaroos began their New Zealand tour with a warm-up match against the Central Regions Development team in Palmerston North.

== Table ==
Pos	Nation	Pld	W	D	L	PF	PA	PD
1	New Zealand	2	2	0	0	50	22	+28
2	Australia	2	0	0	2	22	50	−28

== Results ==
=== 1st Test ===
16 October 2007
14:30 NZDT (UTC+13)

New Zealand	21–10	Australia
Try: Fa'anati Aniseko; Carla Hohepa (2); Pen: Emma Jensen (2)		Try: Tegan French; Con: Alana Thomas; Pen: Alana Thomas

Cooks Gardens, Wanganui
Referee: Nicky Inwood (NZR)

LP	1	Kathleen Wilton
HK	2	Fiao'o Fa'amausili
TP	3	Beth Mallard
LL	4	Monalisa Codling
RL	5	Victoria Heighway
BF	6	Kimberly Smith
OF	7	Melissa Ruscoe (c)
N8	8	Linda Itunu
SH	9	Emma Jensen
FH	10	Anna Richards
LW	11	Carla Hohepa
IC	12	Anika Tiplady
OC	13	Huriana Manuel
RW	14	Victoria Grant
FB	15	Claire Richardson
Replacements:
	16	Ruth McKay
	17	Tia Paasi
	18	Vita Robinson
	19	Justine Lavea
	20	Kendra Cocksedge
	21	Vania Lavea
	22	Fa'anati Aniseko
Coach:
(New Zealand) Dale Atkins

LP	1	Lindsay Morgan
HK	2	Silei Poluleuligaga
TP	3	Vanessa Bradley
LL	4	Alex Hargreaves
RL	5	Alicia Frost
BF	6	Kim Wilson
OF	7	Chris Ross
N8	8	Tasileta Bethell
SH	9	Cheryl Soon (c)
FH	10	Alana Thomas
LW	11	Tegan French
IC	12	Tui Ormsby
OC	13	Trish Brown
RW	14	Lisa Fiaola
FB	15	Tobie McGann
Replacements:
	16	Louise Morrison
	17	Kylie Pennell
	18	Se'ei Sa'u
	19	Rebecca Trethowan
	20	Iliseva Batibasaga
	21	Megan Valler
	22	Cassandra Nunn
Coach:
(Australia) Steve Hamson

=== 2nd Test ===
20 October 2007
14:30 NZDT (UTC+13)

New Zealand	29–12	Australia
Try: Victoria Grant; Carla Hohepa (3); Linda Itunu; Con: Claire Richardson (2)		Try: Tobie McGann; Silei Poluleuligaga; Con: Alana Thomas

Jerry Collins Stadium, Porirua
Referee: Nicky Inwood (NZR)

LP	1	Kathleen Wilton
HK	2	Fiao'o Fa'amausili
TP	3	Tia Paasi
LL	4	Monalisa Codling
RL	5	Victoria Heighway
BF	6	Melissa Ruscoe (c)
OF	7	Aimee Sutorius
N8	8	Linda Itunu
SH	9	Emma Jensen
FH	10	Anna Richards
LW	11	Carla Hohepa
IC	12	Teresa Te Tamaki
OC	13	Huriana Manuel
RW	14	Victoria Grant
FB	15	Claire Richardson
Replacements:
	16	Ruth McKay
	17	Beth Mallard
	18	Amy Farr
	19	Justine Lavea
	20	Waimania Teddy
	21	Vania Lavea
	22	Fa'anati Aniseko
Coach:
(New Zealand) Dale Atkins

LP	1	Lindsay Morgan
HK	2	Silei Poluleuligaga
TP	3	Vanessa Bradley
LL	4	Alicia Frost
RL	5	Chris Ross
BF	6	Kim Wilson
OF	7	Alex Hargreaves
N8	8	Tasileta Bethell
SH	9	Cheryl Soon (c)
FH	10	Alana Thomas
LW	11	Ruan Sims
IC	12	Tui Ormsby
OC	13	Lisa Fiaola
RW	14	Trish Brown
FB	15	Tobie McGann
Replacements:
	16	Louise Morrison
	17	Kylie Pennell
	18	Se'ei Sa'u
	19	Rebecca Trethowan
	20	Iliseva Batibasaga
	21	Megan Valler
	22	Cassandra Nunn
Coach:
(Australia) Steve Hamson
