= 2002 Women's Rugby World Cup squads =

2002 Rugby World Cup Squads
Tournament details
- Host nation: 2002 Rugby World Cup Squads
- Dates: 13 May – 25 May
- No. of nations: 16

This article lists the official squads for the 2002 Women's Rugby World Cup in Barcelona, Spain.

== Pool A ==
=== New Zealand ===
Coach: Darryl Suasua

Note: Flags indicate national union for the club/province as defined by World Rugby.

Player	Position	Date of birth (age)	Caps	Club/province
Monalisa Codling	Second row	20 April 1977		(New Zealand) Auckland
Vanessa Cootes	Wing	26 July 1969		(New Zealand) Waikato
Susan Dawson	Hooker	20 January 1971		(New Zealand) Northland
Fiao'o Fa'amausili	Hooker	30 September 1980		(New Zealand) Auckland
Isabella Gray	Flanker	19 January 1974		(New Zealand) Wellington
Victoria Heighway	Second row	28 November 1980		(New Zealand) Auckland
Monique Hirovanaa	Scrum-half	25 May 1966		(New Zealand) Auckland
Emma Marie Jensen	Scrum-half	25 November 1977		(New Zealand) Waikato
Fiona King	Second row	1 February 1972		(New Zealand) Otago
Adrienne Lili'i	Flanker	9 November 1970		(New Zealand) Auckland
Rebecca Luia'ana	Prop	21 September 1970		(New Zealand) Wellington
Amiria Marsh	Wing	17 May 1983		(New Zealand) Canterbury
Rochelle Martin	Number 8	28 March 1973		(New Zealand) Auckland
Hannah Myers	Wing	28 September 1979		(New Zealand) Otago
Farah Palmer (c)	Hooker	27 November 1972		(New Zealand) Manawatu
Casey Robertson	Prop	24 February 1981		(New Zealand) Canterbury
Melodie Robinson	Flanker	25 May 1973		(New Zealand) Auckland
Annaleah Rush	Centre	15 April 1976		(New Zealand) Auckland
Regina Sheck	Prop	9 November 1969		(New Zealand) Waikato
Exia Edwards (nee Shelford)	Centre	12 November 1975		(New Zealand) Saracens, Bay of Plenty
Suzy Shortland	Centre	23 January 1974		(New Zealand) Auckland
Helen Va'aga	Prop	11 August 1977		(New Zealand) Auckland
Cheryl Waaka	Number 8	12 May 1970		(New Zealand) Auckland
Tammi Wilson	Fullback	29 September 1973		(New Zealand) Auckland
Dianne Kahura	Wing	1 May 1969		(New Zealand) Auckland
Anna Richards	Fly-half	3 December 1964		(New Zealand) Auckland

=== Australia ===
Coach: Stephen Swan

Note: Flags indicate national union for the club/province as defined by World Rugby.

Player	Position	Date of birth (age)	Caps	Club/province
Penny Anderson	Number 8	19 January 1977		(Australia)
Elizabeth Andrew	??	2 November 1971		(Australia)
Ianthe Astley-Boden	Second row	20 February 1975		(Australia)
Jamie Blazejewski	Wing	29 November 1977		(Australia)
Alyssa Campbell	Fullback	29 April 1975		(Australia)
Louise Cooke	Hooker	11 March 1978		(Australia)
Davina Craft	??	2 October 1973		(Australia)
Genevieve Devles	??	21 September 1978		(Australia)
Jennifer Egan	Prop	7 July 1977		(Australia)
Kerri Louise Ferris	Scrum-half	9 January 1970		(Australia)
Lisa Fiaola	Centre	25 November 1970		(Australia)
Mieke Fortune	Second row	4 January 1977		(Australia)
Alexandra Hargreaves	??	13 November 1980		(Australia)
Debby Hodgkinson	??	22 November 1980		(Australia)
Bronwyn Laidlaw	Fullback	27 December 1974		(Australia)
Melissa Latu	Prop			(Australia)
Bronnie Mackintosh	Flanker	24 June 1970		(Australia)
Sharon O'Kane	Centre	27 September 1976		(Australia)
Tui Ormsby	Fly-half	20 January 1978		(Australia)
Nyree Osieck	Wing	30 December 1976		(Australia)
Pearl Palaalii	Prop	7 January 1970		(Australia)
Charmain Smith	Wing	17 February 1977		(Australia)
Cheryl Soon	??	23 September 1975		(Australia)
Rebecca Wakim	Prop	5 August 1972		(Australia)
Nicole Wickert	Loose forward	13 September 1968		(Australia)
Selena Worsley (c)	Flanker	18 April 1975		(Australia)

=== Wales ===
Coach: Gareth Kear Talmage Hodges

Note: Flags indicate national union for the club/province as defined by World Rugby.

Player	Position	Date of birth (age)	Caps	Club/province
Gemma Allan	??	26 April 1983		(Wales)
Melissa Berry (c)	Centre	16 September 1981		(Wales)
Liza Jane Burgess	Second row	24 March 1964		(Wales)
April Dent	Second row	28 February 1974		(Wales)
Claire Donovan	Second row	13 September 1971		(Wales)
Catrin Ann Edwards	Prop	15 September 1980		(Wales)
Clare Flowers	Wing	20 June 1972		(Wales)
Kath Foale	??			(Wales)
Sue Granger	??	19 November 1972		(Wales)
Kerry Jenkins	Scrum-half	26 May 1983		(Wales)
Kate Jones	??	20 September 1969		(Wales)
Susan Jones	??	1 February 1972		(Wales)
Jamie Kift	Hooker	25 November 1978		(Wales)
Katherine Lenaghan	Hooker	6 October 1981		(Wales)
Dawn Mason	??	22 April 1972		(Wales)
Samantha Mason	Prop	30 November 1982		(Wales)
Karen Mayze	Flanker	19 March 1976		(Wales)
Philippa Minto	Flanker	17 June 1968		(Wales)
Jacqueline Morgan	Flanker	23 March 1964		(Wales)
Rhonwen Owens	Scrum-half	12 December 1970		(Wales)
Angharad Phillips	??	24 October 1983		(Wales)
Louise Rickard	Centre	31 December 1970		(Wales)
Awen Thomas	Fly-half	7 January 1981		(Wales)
Catherine Walkley	??	10 March 1978		(Wales)
Rhian Wilmott	??	12 March 1983		(Wales)
Kylie Wilson	Number 8	18 September 1975		(Wales)

=== Germany ===
Coach: Jens Michau

Note: Flags indicate national union for the club/province as defined by World Rugby.

Player	Position	Date of birth (age)	Caps	Club/province
Doris Albers	Wing	30 April 1974		(Germany)
Simone Borchert	Second row	27 March 1975		(Germany)
Junduca Coffler	??			(Germany)
Sonja Cole	??	19 February 1980		(Germany)
Anke Drexier	Scrum-half	9 July 1977		(Germany)
Ninja Duri	Centre	25 September 1979		(Germany)
Barbara Frauenfeld	Fullback	9 August 1970		(Germany)
Maren Hulverscheidt	Flanker	27 October 1970		(Germany)
Johanna Jahnke	Number 8	27 March 1983		(Germany)
Silke Manben	??	27 March 1973		(Germany)
Undine Mannel	Prop	18 March 1977		(Germany)
Martina Marsch	Scrum-half			(Germany)
Freia Michau	Fly-half	15 September 1983		(Germany)
Elke Mikkelsen	??	24 October 1972		(Germany)
Dagmar Pietzsch	Wing	7 August 1975		(Germany)
Jika Sander	Hooker	27 June 1978		(Germany)
Mariena Sang	Second row	1 November 1974		(Germany)
Katja Scheinemann	Prop	30 April 1971		(Germany)
Sabina Schubert	Prop	13 August 1980		(Germany)
Silvia Schumacher	Fly-half	28 April 1979		(Germany)
Yvonne Schwarzkopf	Hooker	13 January 1973		(Germany)
Veronic Stamos	??	27 March 1975		(Germany)
Susanne Weidemann	??	21 December 1969		(Germany)
Moa Wejle	Centre	19 March 1976		(Germany)
Stefanie Werner	Wing			(Germany)
Manuela Wiedemann	??	13 July 1971		(Germany)

== Pool B ==
=== France ===
Coach: Wanda Noury

Note: Flags indicate national union for the club/province as defined by World Rugby.

Player	Position	Date of birth (age)	Caps	Club/province
Nathalie Amiel (c)	Centre	4 November 1970		(France)
Armeule Auclair	??	10 June 1973		(France)
Corinna Bessellere	??	13 February 1976		(France)
Maylis Bonnin	Second row	20 March 1975		(France)
Maud Camatta	??	18 July 1980		(France)
Catherine Devillers	Wing	18 April 1970		(France)
Annabel Donnadieu	Wing	11 January 1972		(France)
Clotilde Flaugere	Number 8	22 February 1980		(France)
Sandrine Fontaine	??	12 August 1972		(France)
Fanny Gelis	??	10 March 1977		(France)
Marjoire Hans	??	22 September 1981		(France)
Annick Hayraud	??	9 September 1967		(France)
Daniele Irazu	Prop	12 December 1974		(France)
Christelle LeDuff	Wing	21 November 1982		(France)
Corinne Le Mazurier	??	28 March 1972		(France)
Alexia Massacand	Second row	24 February 1972		(France)
Elodie Celine Maybon	??	17 July 1977		(France)
Delphine Plantet	Centre	8 May 1979		(France)
Stephanie Provost	Scrum-half	27 May 1973		(France)
Julie Pujol	??	30 April 1981		(France)
Delphine Roussel	Prop	6 June 1966		(France)
Aline Sagols	Flanker	2 September 1967		(France)
Estelle Sartini	Fullback	1 June 1973		(France)
Sophie Serres	Flanker	7 June 1975		(France)

=== United States ===
- Head Coach: Martin Gallagher
- Forwards Coach: Tim Breckenridge
- Backs Coach: George Metuarau

Note: Flags indicate national union for the club/province as defined by World Rugby.

Player	Position	Date of birth (age)	Caps	Club/province
Hedwig Louise Jan Aerts	Fly-half	3 August 1975		(United States) New York RFC
Ki Marie Baja	Centre	15 December 1979		(United States) Washington Furies RFC
Liberty Caplan	Flanker	13 November 1978		(United States) University of Northern Iowa
Jennifer Elisabeth Crouse	Second row	6 June 1974		(United States) Beantown Women's RFC
Kimberly Cyganik	Scrum-half	2 January 1971		(United States) Maryland Stingers Women's RFC
Shari Dahlberg	Scrum-half	7 December 1971		(United States) Wisconsin Women's RFC
Stacey Davis	Wing	9 September 1977		(United States) East Bay Bulldogs Women's RC
Jill Fenske	Hooker	19 August 1972		(United States) University of California, Los Angeles Women's Rugby
Nancy Fitz (c)	Second row	24 January 1967		(United States) Washington Women's RFC
Stacy Foley	Flanker	14 October 1974		(United States) Keystone Rugby Club
Cynthia Gerhke	Hooker	22 November 1976		(United States) Wisconsin Women's RFC
Heather Helen Hale (vc)	Centre	23 April 1975		(United States) Washington Women's RFC
Patricia Maria Jervey	Wing	29 March 1964		(United States) Atlanta Harlequins Women's RC
Eleanor Karvoski	Wing	19 June 1975		(United States) New York RFC
Elizabeth Kirk	Prop	19 April 1978		(United States) Seattle RFC
Phaidra Knight	Prop	4 July 1974		(United States) Wisconsin Women's RFC
Elizabeth Lake	Prop	1 July 1968		(United States) Minnesota Valkyries RFC
Kerry McCabe	Back	29 August 1967		(United States) Beantown Women's RFC
Rebecca Metzger	Flanker	28 July 1976		(United States) Maryland Stingers Women's RFC
Meredith Ottens	Prop	19 January 1969		(United States) Minnesota Valkyries RFC
Ines Rodriguez	Fly-half	28 May 1975		(United States) Keystone Rugby Club
Myra Sandquist-Reuter	Second row	21 October 1968		(United States) Twin Cities Amazons
Jennifer Sikora	Flanker	5 July 1977		(United States) Keystone Rugby Club
Kathryn Stewart	Fullback	18 October 1978		(United States) New York RFC
Rebecca Wallison	Centre	14 February 1975		(United States) New York RFC
Alexandra Williams	Number 8	2 November 1969		(United States) Berkeley Women's All Blues RC

=== Kazakhstan ===
Coach: Alexander Stalmakhovich

Note: Flags indicate national union for the club/province as defined by World Rugby.

Player	Position	Date of birth (age)	Caps	Club/province
Irina Amossova	??	13 November 1982		(Kazakhstan)
Tatyana Ashikhmina	Hooker	11 August 1974		(Kazakhstan)
Natalya Baibaytrova	??	19 September 1973		(Kazakhstan)
Irina Chernenko	Wing	9 November 1978		(Kazakhstan)
Larissa Chuprikova	??	22 October 1978		(Kazakhstan)
Yelena Dadsheva	Second row	11 April 1970		(Kazakhstan)
Aigerym Daurembayeva	Wing	4 August 1980		(Kazakhstan)
Aigul Dzhartybayeva	??	1 January 1976		(Kazakhstan)
Lyubov Klepikova	Number 8	28 January 1975		(Kazakhstan)
Natalya Kolbina	??			(Kazakhstan)
Olga Kumanikina	Prop	14 August 1974		(Kazakhstan)
Svetlana Mochkovskaya	??			(Kazakhstan)
Alfiya Mustafina	Flanker	14 May 1969		(Kazakhstan)
Anna Nedospassova	Fullback	11 January 1976		(Kazakhstan)
Olga Pavlova	Centre			(Kazakhstan)
Irina Radzevil	Prop	27 October 1979		(Kazakhstan)
Tatyanna Rudnitskaya	??	4 April 1969		(Kazakhstan)
Yuliya Tereshkova	??	7 April 1980		(Kazakhstan)
Makhabbat Tugamekova	Flanker	12 July 1976		(Kazakhstan)
Tatyana Tur	Fly-half	4 December 1974		(Kazakhstan)
Yuliya Turbina	??	12 November 1981		(Kazakhstan)
Nezbudey Valentina	??			(Kazakhstan)
Anna Yakovleva	Second row	10 November 1983		(Kazakhstan)
Svetlana Karatygina	??	11 May 1974		(Kazakhstan)
Olga Zuyeva	??	29 March 1983		(Kazakhstan)

=== Netherlands ===
Coach: Nel Roeleveld

Note: Flags indicate national union for the club/province as defined by World Rugby.

Player	Position	Date of birth (age)	Caps	Club/province
Esther Abels	Second row	31 October 1973		(Netherlands)
Anouschka Adriaens	Fly-half	5 April 1971		(Netherlands)
Dianne Boonstra	??	9 June 1968		(Netherlands)
Linda Franssen	Scrum-half	26 August 1981		(Netherlands)
Frederike Hof	??	24 August 1977		(Netherlands)
Tessa Kocken	Centre	28 September 1975		(Netherlands)
Jolanda Kramer	Prop	{{{age}}}		(Netherlands)
Madelon Lohuis	??	24 September 1971		(Netherlands)
Henriette Luinge	Prop	30 June 1971		(Netherlands)
Klasina Posthumus	??	4 June 1975		(Netherlands)
Jennifer Roth	??	2 February 1983		(Netherlands)
Hilde Schoneville	??	12 January 1979		(Netherlands)
Elliz Slootweg	Second row	17 June 1972		(Netherlands)
Minke Twilnstra	Prop	25 July 1974		(Netherlands)
Simone Van Delft	Flanker	13 April 1975		(Netherlands)
Ingrid Van Der Ven	Wing			(Netherlands)
Annemiek Van Elk	Hooker	1 October 1967		(Netherlands)
Nadia Van Engelen	??	19 February 1978		(Netherlands)
Mieke Van Hove	Flanker	3 November 1979		(Netherlands)
Bianca Van Leeuwen	Number 8	11 August 1974		(Netherlands)
Sarianne Van Rijn	Wing	28 June 1953		(Netherlands)
Sandra Veerman	Second row	15 December 1975		(Netherlands)
Fernke Visser	Fullback	26 April 1978		(Netherlands)
Kitty Vloemans	Centre	17 July 1973		(Netherlands)
Sascha Werlich	??	13 March 1970		(Netherlands)
Ilse Wijbenga	??	26 April 1972		(Netherlands)

== Pool C ==
=== England ===
Coach: Heather Stirrup

Note: Flags indicate national union for the club/province as defined by World Rugby.

Player	Position	Date of birth (age)	Caps	Club/province
Heather Baillie	??	4 January 1977		(England)
Teresa Andrews	Second row	4 January 1977		(England) Richmond
Susie Appleby	Scrum-half	21 December 1970		(England) Clifton
Gillian Ann Burns	Number 8	12 July 1964		(England) Waterloo
Helen Clayton	Flanker	17 June 1971		(England) Saracens
Nicola Coffin	Flanker	29 September 1974		(England)
Nicola Crawford	Wing	20 November 1971		(England) Worcester
Susan Margaret Day	Centre	20 October 1972		(England) Wasps
Assunta de Biase	Centre	27 May 1969		(England) Saracens
Christine Diver	Wing	2 June 1971		(England) Richmond
Maxine Patricia Edwards	Prop	28 July 1966		(England) Richmond
Emily Feltham	Wing	17 August 1977		(England) Richmond
Claire Joanne Frost	Number 8	22 March 1973		(England) Saracens
Amy Garnett	Hooker	31 March 1976		(England) Saracens
Paula George	Fullback	20 October 1968		(England) Wasps
Karen Henderson	Second row	10 July 1967		(England) Clifton
Vanessa Huxford	Prop	13 October 1970		(England) Wasps
Nicola_Jupp	Centre	26 October 1975		(England) Richmond
Louise Latter	Prop	4 August 1973		(England)
Emma Mitchell	Scrum-half	13 April 1966		(England)
Ann O'Flynn	Hooker	20 December 1973		(England) Waterloo
Teresa Jane O'Reilly	Prop	16 September 1964		(England) Saracens
Jennifer Phillips	Flanker	29 May 1972		(England) Saracens
Shelley Rae	Fly-half	1 June 1976		(England) Wasps
Selena Rudge	Centre	5 November 1976		(England) Clifton
Georgia Ruth Stevens	Flanker	13 June 1973		(England) Clifton
Jenny Sutton	Second row	26 February 1969		(England) Richmond
Joanne Yapp	Scrum-half	6 September 1979		(England) Worcester

=== Spain ===
Note: Flags indicate national union for the club/province as defined by World Rugby.

Player	Position	Date of birth (age)	Caps	Club/province
Karitte Alegria	Back row	10 March 1971		Getxo RT
Eider Barrena	Centre	29 January 1976		Elorrio RT
Ioana Barrena	Prop	1 July 1978		Elorrio RT
Mercedes Batidor (c)	Back row	21 July 1972		RC L'Hospitalet
Rosa Calafat	Scrum-half	28 May 1970		RC L'Hospitalet
Anna Isabel de la Parte	Prop	20 February 1976		Universitario Bilbao
Itziar DÍaz	Fly-half	16 December 1973		Majadahonda RC
Paz Estevan	Fly-half	15 December 1970		UE Santboiana
Inés Etxegibel	Centre	7 January 1974		RC L'Hospitalet
Olatz Fernández de Arroyabe	Hooker	18 March 1970		Elorrio RT
Sonia Gallardo	Centre	6 July 1979	0	INEF Barcelona
Olga García	Wing	24 November 1973		Liceo Francés
Marta Gran	Back row	25 November 1968		RC L'Hospitalet
Nerea Lasa	Centre			Durango RT
Christina Lopez	Prop	20 February 1976		Liceo Francés
Pilar López	Second row	26 October 1971		Sanse Scrum
Nerea Martinez	Wing	8 March 1973		Getxo RT
Angelina Masdeu	Second row	20 February 1977		INEF Lleida
Beatriz Muriel	Hooker	20 September 1976		Majadahonda RC
María Isabel Pérez	Wing	13 December 1979		Liceo Francés
Olga Pons	Prop	25 August 1969		INEF Barcelona
Altixiber Porras	Back row	9 May 1978	0	Gaztedi RT
Isabel Rodríguez	Scrum-half	26 March 1975		Getxo RT
Mariola Rus Rufino	Second row	15 May 1969		UCM
Cristina Valdés	Back row	19 April 1973		RC L'Hospitalet
Coral Vila	Fullback	2 July 1972		(France) USA Toulouges

=== Italy ===
Coach: Roberto Esposito

Note: Flags indicate national union for the club/province as defined by World Rugby.

Player	Position	Date of birth (age)	Caps	Club/province
Valentina Avella	??	13 April 1981		(Italy)
Elena Bisetto	Centre	17 November 1969		(Italy)
Samantha Botter	Fullback	6 August 1970		(Italy)
Giola Michela Buratto	Second row	20 January 1973		(Italy)
Giuliana Campanella	Flanker	4 November 1976		(Italy)
Adelina Corbanese	Prop	28 March 1966		(Italy)
Fulvia Corro	??	23 March 1973		(Italy)
Elisa Facchini	??	12 August 1977		(Italy)
Lisa Francesschin	Second row			(Italy)
Francesca Gallina	??			(Italy)
Silvia Gaudino	Second row	14 December 1981		(Italy)
Daniela Gini	Wing	14 August 1977		(Italy)
Caterina Maschera	Prop	14 March 1973		(Italy)
Sabrina Melis	??	5 April 1970		(Italy)
Erika Morri	??	24 April 1971		(Italy)
Paola Nacca	Flanker	20 September 1964		(Italy)
Sonia Pace	??	23 July 1977		(Italy)
Silvia Peron	??	29 December 1983		(Italy)
Silvia Pizzati	Centre	7 November 1975		(Italy)
Maria Sanfilippo	Prop	7 May 1980		(Italy)
Elena Sartorato	Number 8	21 March 1974		(Italy)
Veronica Schiavon	Wing	24 July 1982		(Italy)
Licia Stefan (c)	Hooker	22 September 1976		(Italy)
Michela Tondinelli	Scrum-half	15 January 1972		(Italy)
Elizabetta Toniolo	??	4 April 1972		(Italy)
Monica Zanetti	Fly-half	21 January 1980		(Italy)

=== Japan ===
Head Coach: Noriko Kishida

Note: Flags indicate national union for the club/province as defined by World Rugby.

Player	Position	Date of birth (age)	Caps	Club/province
Mie Adachi	Flanker	17 June 1972		(Japan)
Keiko Asami	Scrum-half	4 March 1977		(Japan)
Angela Elting	Wing	15 April 1973		(Japan)
Tae Enomoto	Centre	4 August 1979		(Japan)
Naoko Hasebe	Wing	7 March 1981		(Japan)
Katsuyo Hirano	Number 8	8 October 1973		(Japan)
Yuka Honma	Centre	17 June 1982		(Japan)
Naoka Kato	Fly-half	22 July 1976		(Japan)
Chihiro Koga	??	9 November 1976		(Japan)
Chika Miyagawa	Second row	30 January 1971		(Japan)
Harve Nagano	Wing	29 August 1976		(Japan)
Saya Nagata	Hooker	19 October 1974		(Japan)
Fujiko Namiki	Prop	27 April 1971		(Japan)
Mamiko Ohtake	??	15 February 1977		(Japan)
Mami Okada	??	5 February 1980		(Japan)
Maya Okada	??	7 September 1978		(Japan)
Natsuko Saki	??	21 July 1977		(Japan)
Chikako Sasaki	Flanker	19 April 1971		(Japan)
Aiko Shikanai	Prop	21 July 1974		(Japan)
Evi Suzuki	??	3 September 1979		(Japan)
Maki Tabata	??	24 August 1972		(Japan)
Chikako Toyama (c)	Second row	5 December 1972		(Japan)
Ryoko Tsuboi	Scrum-half	4 December 1978		(Japan)
Tsukasa Tsujimoto	??	1 March 1982		(Japan)
Miho Udagawa	Fullback	14 October 1976		(Japan)
Mariko Yoshioka	Fly-half	7 December 1972		(Japan)

== Pool D ==
=== Canada ===
Coach: Ric Suggitt

Note: Flags indicate national union for the club/province as defined by World Rugby.

Player	Position	Date of birth (age)	Caps	Club/province
Heather Baillie	Centre			(Canada) Ste Anne de Bellevue
Araba "Roo" Chintoh	Lock	5 September 1978	16	(Ontario) Toronto Scottish
Sommer Christie	Scrum-half	17 August 1979		(Canada) Ste Anne de Bellevue
Leslie Anne Cripps	Prop	24 September 1977		(Canada) James Bay RFC
Erin Dance	Scrum-half	21 October 1974		(Canada) Montreal Barbarians
Raquel Helena Eldridge	Hooker	15 May 1976		(England) Wasps
Gillian Florence	Back row	30 April 1975		(Canada) Ste Anne de Bellevue
Julie Foster	Fly-half	12 January 1969		(Canada) Regina Breakers
Maria Gallo	Centre	21 September 1977		(Canada) Fergus Highland
Danielle Goulet	Lock			(Canada) Ottawa Indians
Dawn Keim	Back row	15 November 1977		(England) Wasps
Josée Lacasse	Prop	9 March 1970		(Canada) Ste Anne de Bellevue
Angela Locke	Lock	8 April 1974		(Canada) Montreal Barbarians
Maureen MacMahon	Number 8	14 December 1970		(Canada) Toronto Scottish
Collete Yvonne Margaret Mcauley	Wing	11 May 1973		(Canada) highland RFC
Kelly Mccallum	Fly-half	6 February 1973		(Canada) Douglas RFC
Erin Murphy	??	21 November 1970		(Canada) Yeoman RFC
Katherine Murray	Back row	10 October 1980		(Canada)
Moira Shiels	Hooker	13 September 1966		(Canada) Tigers RFC
Lauren Smithson	Back row	21 July 1979		(Canada) Ottawa Scottish
Sherri Sparling	Wing	19 March 1969		(Canada) Ottawa Irish
Sherri Tanner	Back row	30 December 1968		(Canada) Ottawa Irish
Christie Thompson	Wing	27 March 1978		(Canada) JBAA RFC (Edmonton)
Kirsten Todd	Prop	24 June 1973		(Canada) NorWesters RFC
Shelia Turner	Prop	25 November 1972		(Canada) Montreal Barbarians
Sarah Ulmer	Centre	24 April 1977		(Canada) Regina Breakers RFC

=== Ireland ===
Coach: Grainne O'Connell

Note: Flags indicate national union for the club/province as defined by World Rugby.

Player	Position	Date of birth (age)	Caps	Club/province
Louise Beamish	Scrum-half	8 April 1980		(Republic of Ireland)
Sarah Jane Belton	Fullback	21 October 1980		(Republic of Ireland) UL Bohemian
Rachel Isobel Rosaleen Boyd	Wing	29 November 1978		(Northern Ireland) Cooke
Lynne Catherine Cantwell	??	27 September 1981		(Republic of Ireland) UL Bohemians
Edel Coen	Prop	3 October 1977		(Republic of Ireland) Highfield
Elaine Collins	??	24 May 1970		(Republic of Ireland) UL Bohemian
Maura Coulter	Hooker	18 January 1970		(Republic of Ireland) Blackrock College
Magali Dolo	??	14 November 1977		(Republic of Ireland)
Karen Eagleson	Scrum-half	13 September 1974		(Northern Ireland) Cooke
Suzanne Marie Flemming (c)	Wing	4 July 1974		(Northern Ireland) Cooke
Rosaleen Jane Foley	??	27 October 1972		(Republic of Ireland) Shannon
Rochelle Howell	Fly-half	12 December 1970		(Republic of Ireland) UL Bohemians
Patrique Kelly	Centre	8 June 1980		(Republic of Ireland) UL Bohemians
Jean Marie Longergan	Prop	30 June 1977		(Republic of Ireland) Shannon
Gillian McAllister	??	29 December 1970		(Republic of Ireland)
Anne-Marie McAllister	??	13 September 1972		(Republic of Ireland) Blackrock College
Nicole Milne	Centre	5 June 1974		(England) Worcester
Bridget Montgomery	Flanker	9 April 1974		(England) Ripon
Fiona Neary	??	18 September 1977		(England) Waterloo
Mary O'Loughlin	Number 8	17 September 1970		(Republic of Ireland)
Maeve Quirke	Second row	12 February 1977		(Republic of Ireland) UL Bohemian
Rachel Reid	Flanker	23 January 1972		(Northern Ireland) Cooke
Joy Sparkes	??	10 December 1975		(Republic of Ireland)
Fiona Steed	Flanker	28 April 1972		(Republic of Ireland) Shannon
Rachel Rucker	Wing	27 March 1983		(Republic of Ireland)
Eryka Wessell	??	12 June 1972		(England) Richmond

=== Samoa ===
Coach: Feturi Elisaia

Note: Flags indicate national union for the club/province as defined by World Rugby.

Player	Position	Date of birth (age)	Caps	Club/province
Oka Autagavaia	Fly-half			(Samoa)
Luisa Avaiki	Centre	19 April 1973		(Samoa)
Alaisalatemaota Bakulich-Leavasa	Hooker	9 October 1979		(Samoa)
Amanda Kara Cahill	Back	26 June 1979		(Samoa)
Sunui Vanessa Chongnee	Lock	28 June 1978		(Samoa)
Christina Hunt	??	21 August 1973		(Samoa)
Loretta Hunt	??	5 November 1981		(Samoa)
Brigitta I'Iga	??	9 February 1969		(Samoa)
Moana Laumatia	Centre	29 March 1981		(Samoa)
Terisa Lealaisalanoa	Scrum-half	11 March 1973		(Samoa)
Poto Maria Nice Lio	Hooker	2 May 1977		(Samoa)
Vanessa Masoe	Lock	8 December 1976		(Samoa)
Leute Mataipule	Back	13 December 1979		(Samoa)
Melesete Natoealofa	Number 8	24 February 1974		(Samoa)
Dawn Lucia Patelesio	Fly-half	23 October 1976		(Samoa)
Judith Perez	Flanker	4 February 1970		(Samoa)
Sosefina Petelo	Fullback	10 December 1975		(Samoa)
Afatia Sa	Prop	2 November 1980		(Samoa)
Ainslie Maxene Sauvao (c)	Lock	5 November 1970		(Samoa)
Diana Maele Sipili	Centre	14 June 1974		(Samoa)
Doris Ta'ala	Forward	16 August 1975		(Samoa)
Barbara Tyrell	Flanker	31 August 1972		(Samoa)
Louena Valu	Prop	3 June 1966		(Samoa)
Denise Puna Tia	Forward	3 January 1979		(Samoa)
Lorina Buckley	Wing	16 January 1977		(Samoa)

=== Scotland ===
Coach: Ruth Cranston

Note: Flags indicate national union for the club/province as defined by World Rugby.

Player	Position	Date of birth (age)	Caps	Club/province
Paula Chalmers	Scrum-half	8 June 1972		(Scotland) Murrayfield Wanderers
Alison Christie	Prop	1 December 1969		(Scotland) Royal High
Lee Cockburn	Second row	17 May 1968		(Scotland) Royal High
Jennifer Dickson	??	24 July 1975		(Scotland) Richmond
Denise Fairbairn	Fly-half	12 May 1972		(Scotland)
Karen Ross Findlay (c)	Prop	27 May 1968		(England) Richmond
Vicky Galbraith	??	11 December 1972		(England) Richmond
Gillian Gibbon	Wing	20 April 1977		(Scotland) Royal High
Fiona Gillanders	Flanker	16 August 1975		(England) Wasps
Jennifer Hanley	??	25 July 1972		(England) Waterloo
Sarah Higgins	Fullback	18 October 1972		(Scotland) Royal High
Angela Hutt	Wing	5 July 1981		(Scotland)
Donna Kennedy	Number 8	16 February 1972		(Scotland) Royal high
Nicola Macdonald	Centre	13 May 1977		(Scotland) Glasgow Southern
Ali Mackenzie	??	22 February 1972		(Scotland) Royal High
Elizabeth Jane Macleod	Flanker	2 May 1975		(Scotland) Murrayfield Wanderers
Alison McGrandles	Fly-half	12 July 1972		(England) Richmond
Clare Muir	Second row	29 September 1975		(Scotland) Murrayfield Wanderers
Alison Newall	??	29 September 1969		(Scotland)
Elaine Nicol	??	13 April 1972		(Scotland)
Lisa Margaret O'Keefe	??	{{{age}}}		(England) Richmond
Rimma Petlevannaya	Centre	30 September 19790		(Scotland) Murrayfield Wanderers
Jennifer Sheerin	Flanker	21 May 1973		(England) Richmond
Rhona Alison Shepherd	Wing	28 August 1976		(Scotland) Murrayfield Wanderers
Mary Tierney	??	1 June 1976		(Scotland) Watsonians
Victoria Wiseman	Hooker	31 March 1975		(England) Richmond
