= Valler =

Valler may refer to:

== People ==
- Megan Valler (born 1981), Australian rugby union player
- Rachel Valler (born c. 1930), Australian pianist

== Other uses ==
- Valler station, metro station in Norway
- Valler Tal, valley in Italy
- Valler Upper Secondary School, school in Norway
