= Anna Hopkins (rugby union) =

New Zealand rugby union player

- Born: 21 October 1970 Wyndham, New Zealand
- Died: 21 July 2014 (aged 43) Australia
- Height: 1.65 m (5 ft 5 in)
- Weight: 55 kg (121 lb)

Rugby union career
- Position: Centre
Amateur team(s)
Years	Team	Apps	(Points)
	Stokes Valley		(0)
Provincial / State sides
Years	Team	Apps	(Points)
1990–1994	Wellington	4	(12)
International career
Years	Team	Apps	(Points)
1991	New Zealand	1	(8)

Anna Hopkins (21 October 1970 – 21 July 2014) was a New Zealand rugby union player.

== Rugby career ==
Hopkins was part of the Black Ferns side that competed at RugbyFest 1990, record keeping of these matches were not accurate but she did make an appearance against the Soviet Union.

Hopkins was selected for New Zealand's squad to the inaugural 1991 Women's Rugby World Cup, she was a non-travelling reserve and did not get to play in the World Cup. She made her Black Ferns debut on 30 March 1991 against a Bromley side at London.
