= Matapo (disambiguation) =

Matapo is the Māori language word for the Stewart Island shag, a species of bird.

Matapo may also refer to:

- Kelani Matapo -New Zealand rugby union and netball player.
- Matapo Matapo - Cook Islands businessman and politician.
- Tekaotiki Matapo - Cook Islands former politician, Cabinet Minister, and diplomat.
- Tetangi Matapo - Cook Islands politician and member of the Cook Islands Parliament.
