= Valser Tal =

Valser Tal (German) is the name for three vallies in Switzerland, Italy, and Austria:

- The German name of Vals Valley, in the canton of the Grisons, Switzerland
- A synonym for Valler Tal in South Tyrol, Italy
- A side valley of the Wipptal in North Tyrol, Austria
