= Amanda Murphy =

Amanda Murphy may refer to:

- Amanda Murphy (politician)
- Amanda Murphy (model)
- Amanda Murphy (rugby union)

== See also ==
- Amanda Landers-Murphy (born 1991), New Zealand squash player
