= Chittock =

Chittock is a surname. Notable people with the surname include:

- Barbara Chittock (born 1985), New Zealand rugby union player
- Derek Chittock (1922–1986), British painter
