= Emma Jensen (disambiguation) =

Emma Jensen is a rugby union player.

Emma Jensen may also refer to:

- Emma Jensen (Big Brother)
- Emma Jensen (screenwriter), writer of Mary Shelley and I am Woman
