= Rebecca Liua'ana =

- Born: September 21, 1970 (age 56) Wellington, New Zealand
- Height: 1.79 m (5 ft 10 in)

Rugby union career
- Position: Prop
Provincial / State sides
Years	Team	Apps	(Points)
	Wellington	79	(125)
International career
Years	Team	Apps	(Points)
1999–2002	New Zealand	10	(10)
Medal record
Representing New Zealand
Women's rugby union
Rugby World Cup
Gold medal – first place	2002 Spain	Team competition

Rebecca Liua'ana (born 21 September 1970) is a former rugby union player. She made her debut for New Zealand against Canada on 16 October 1999 at Palmerston North. She competed at the 2002 Women's Rugby World Cup. Luia'ana was impressive in her teams trouncing of Australia in their quarter-final match. She scored a try in their semifinal victory over France.

Liua'ana featured in two test matches against England in 2001. She was part of the Wellington team that defeated Auckland and won the 2006 NPC final.

Wellington Rugby named their Women's Round 1 Division 1 trophy after her, the Rebecca Liua'ana Trophy.
