= Tia Paasi =

New Zealand rugby union player (1969–2018)

- Born: 29 September 1969 Tonga
- Died: 3 March 2018 (aged 48) Wellington, New Zealand
- Height: 1.72 m (5 ft 8 in)
- Weight: 99 kg (218 lb)

Rugby union career
- Position: Prop
Amateur team(s)
Years	Team	Apps	(Points)
1998–?	Johnsonville		(0)
Provincial / State sides
Years	Team	Apps	(Points)
1998 –2011	Wellington Pride	45	(0)
International career
Years	Team	Apps	(Points)
2001 & 2007	New Zealand	4	(0)

Ponisitia ‘Tia’ Paasi (29 September 1969 – 3 March 2018) was a New Zealand rugby union player.

== Rugby career ==
Paasi made her provincial debut for Wellington Pride in 1998, playing over 50 games at both Loosehead and Tighthead prop.

Paasi played four tests for the Black Ferns in 2001 and 2007. She made her international debut on 9 June 2001 against England at Rotorua. She also featured in the second test against England in Albany, New Zealand.

She announced her retirement in 2004 before making a comeback in 2007, when she was selected to play in the two tests against the Wallaroos for the Laurie O'Reilly Cup.

== Personal life ==
Former New Zealand Warriors forward, Agnatius Paasi, is her nephew.

=== Death ===
Paasi died on 3 March 2018 in Wellington from cancer.
