= Alicia Frost =

- Born: 20 September 1980 (age 46)

Rugby union career
- Position: Lock
International career
Years	Team	Apps	(Points)
2006–2007	Australia	7	(0)

Alicia Frost (born 20 September 1980) is a former Australian rugby union player.

Frost was named in Australia's squad for the 2006 Rugby World Cup in Canada. She made her test debut for the Wallaroos against South Africa in their opening match. She started in their 18–14 victory over Ireland for seventh place.

In 2007, she was a member of the Wallaroos team that played against the Black Ferns for the O'Reilly Cup.
