= Tegan French =

- Born: 21 May 1983 (age 43) Melbourne

Rugby union career
- Position: Wing
International career
Years	Team	Apps	(Points)
2007	Australia	1	(5)

Tegan French (born 21 May 1983) is a former Australian rugby union player.

== Rugby career ==
French was named in Australia's squad for a two-test series against New Zealand at the 2007 Laurie O'Reilly Cup. In her only test appearance for the Wallaroos, she intercepted a pass and scored a try to help her side lead 7–3 in the 25th minute of the first half.
