= Karen Henderson (rugby union) =

England rugby union player

Karen Louise Henderson
- Born: 10 July 1967 (age 59) England

Rugby union career
- Position: Lock
Amateur team(s)
Years	Team	Apps	(Points)
–	Clifton Ladies RFC		
–	Novocastrians		
International career
Years	Team	Apps	(Points)
1994–2002	England	31	
Medal record
Women's rugby union
Representing England
Rugby World Cup
Gold medal – first place	1994 England	Team competition
Silver medal – second place	2002 England	Team competition

Dr Karen Louise Henderson (born 10 July 1967) is an English former rugby union player who played as a lock. She represented the England national team between 1994 and 2002, winning 31 caps, and was part of the squad that won the 1994 Women's Rugby World Cup.

== Early life ==
Henderson was born in 1967 and lived in the south-west of England before relocating to Newcastle at the end of 1992. She was aged 25 at the time of her move to the north-east.

== Rugby career ==
=== Club career ===
Henderson played in the second row and was a member of Clifton Ladies RFC in the early 1990s. In 1992, she was named among the replacements for England in an international against Wales although did not play in that match.

She relocated to Newcastle later that year and by 1993 was playing for Novocastrians. During that season she established herself as a prominent forward and scored a try and kicked a conversion in a match for the club.

Henderson later returned to Clifton Ladies, where she was active throughout the mid-1990s. In 1995 she was selected for a North representative side as a Clifton player. She continued to play for Clifton into the late 1990s and early 2000s, including scoring two tries in a cup match against Lichfield in 1998.

=== International career ===
Henderson was selected for the England women's squad by 1993 and toured Canada with the national side that year. She made her international debut for England against Russia on 11 April 1994 in the opening match of the 1994 Women's Rugby World Cup and was part of the England squad that won that tournament. She went on to become an established international forward, earning 31 caps for England.

Henderson continued to represent England into the early 2000s and played in the 2002 Women's Rugby World Cup, where she started at lock in matches during the tournament. She retired from international rugby following that tournament.

=== Playing style ===
Henderson played as a lock and was noted for her physical presence in the forward pack and effectiveness in close play. At the time of her retirement she was described as providing the "spine" of the England scrum, reflecting her importance to the team’s forward unit.

== Academic career ==
Henderson pursued an academic career alongside her rugby career and holds a PhD. She has worked at the University of the West of England since 1995, where she is a senior lecturer in mathematics. She has also been described as an associate professor in mathematics in later academic material.

Her work has focused on mathematics education and the use of technology to support student learning. She was involved in the development of the DEWIS web-based e-assessment system and research into identifying common student errors in mathematics to provide targeted feedback through digital assessment tools. She is a member of professional mathematical bodies including the Institute of Mathematics and its Applications. and has contributed to work on diagnostic testing and digital learning tools in undergraduate mathematics education. She was appointed a Learning and Teaching Fellow in 2012 and was awarded a National Teaching Fellowship in 2015.
