= Claire Rowat =

New Zealand rugby union player

- Born: 4 January 1983 (age 43)
- Height: 1.7 m (5 ft 7 in)
- Weight: 70 kg (154 lb)

Rugby union career
- Position: Hooker
Provincial / State sides
Years	Team	Apps	(Points)
2007–2012	Wellington	27	(35)
International career
Years	Team	Apps	(Points)
2009	New Zealand	1	(0)

Claire Rowat (born 4 January 1983) is a former New Zealand rugby union player. She played for Wellington at a provincial level.

== Career ==
Rowat grew up in Stratford and has always enjoyed sports, she started out playing netball and swimming before trying different sports including rhythmic gymnastics and basketball at New Plymouth Girls' High School; she only started playing rugby at the age of 15.

She taught at Houghton Valley School in Wellington.

=== Rugby career ===
Rowat played provincially for Wellington.

Rowat was named in the Black Ferns squad that toured England in 2009. She was named on the bench in both tests against England, but did not get to run onto the field. She made her only appearance for the Black Ferns in a non-international match against an England A side on 14 November 2009 at Esher.
