= Läurelin Fourcade =

- Born: 4 September 1988 (age 38)
- Height: 1.52 m (5 ft 0 in)
- Weight: 60 kg (132 lb)

Rugby union career
- Position: Winger
International career
Years	Team	Apps	(Points)
2011–	France	14	(0)
National sevens team
Years	Team		Comps
	France		44 (45 pts)

Läurelin Fourcade (born September 4, 1988) is a French rugby union and rugby sevens player. She played for Les Pink Rockets.

== Rugby career ==
Fourcade competed for France at the 2011 and 2013 Women's Six Nations Championship's. She also featured in their 2011 end-of-year tests and in the 2013 mid-year tests.

Fourcade was part of France's sevens team that competed in the 2018 Rugby World Cup Sevens in San Francisco.

== Personal life ==
Accompanied by Anaïs Lagougine, Fourcade has made trips to Togo.
