= Fiona Hunter =

- Born: 4 August 1970 (age 56) Darfield, New Zealand
- Height: 1.75 m (5 ft 9 in)
- Weight: 76 kg (168 lb)

Rugby union career
International career
Years	Team	Apps	(Points)
1990	New Zealand	2	(0)

Fiona Hunter (née Johnson, born 4 August 1970) is a former New Zealand rugby union player. She made her debut for New Zealand on 26 August at RugbyFest 1990 against the Netherlands at Ashburton. She also featured in the match against the Soviet Union, and made appearances for her club Paremata-Plimmerton.
