= Jennifer Sutton =

England international rugby union player

- Born: February 26, 1969 (age 57) Canada
- Height: 1.86 m (6 ft 1 in)
- Weight: 81 kg (179 lb; 12 st 11 lb)

Rugby union career
- Position: Lock
Senior career
Years	Team	Apps	(Points)
- Richmond
International career
Years	Team	Apps	(Points)
2000	England	48	
Medal record
Representing England
Women's rugby union
Rugby World Cup
Silver medal – second place	2006 Canada	Team competition
Silver medal – second place	2002 Spain	Team competition

Jennifer Sutton (born February 26, 1969) is a former Canadian-born female rugby union player. She represented England at the 2002 and 2006 Women's Rugby World Cup. Sutton wanted to play for Canada at the 1998 World Cup but she was rejected so she opted to play for England.
