= Vanessa Huxford =

England international rugby union player

- Born: 13 October 1970 (age 56)
- Height: 1.69 m (5 ft 6 1/2 in)
- Weight: 90 kg (200 lb; 14 st 2 lb)

Rugby union career
- Position: Prop
Senior career
Years	Team	Apps	(Points)
- Alton RFC
–	Wasps Ladies		
International career
Years	Team	Apps	(Points)
1999-	England	67	
Medal record
Representing England
Women's rugby union
Rugby World Cup
Silver medal – second place	2006 Canada	Team competition
Silver medal – second place	2002 Spain	Team competition

Vanessa Huxford (born 13 October 1970) is a former English female rugby union player. She represented England at the 2002 and 2006 Women's Rugby World Cup, winning 2 silver medals. She started her career at Alton RFC before moving to Wasps Ladies.
