= Louise Morrison =

- Born: 26 June 1980 (age 46)

Rugby union career
- Position: Hooker
International career
Years	Team	Apps	(Points)
2007–2008	Australia	3	(0)

Louise Rodman (née Morrison; born 26 June 1980) is a former Australian rugby union player. She was named in Australia's squad for a two-test series against New Zealand in the 2007 Laurie O'Reilly Cup. She made her international debut for the Wallaroos against the Black Ferns at Cooks Gardens in Wanganui.
