= Cassandra Bailey =

Australian rugby union player

- Born: 25 February 1978 (age 48) Cunnamulla, Queensland
- School: Longreach State High School

Rugby union career
- Position: Wing
International career
Years	Team	Apps	(Points)
2007	Australia	2	(0)

Cassandra Rae Bailey (born 25 February 1978) is a former Australian rugby union player. She was named in Australia's squad for a two-test series against New Zealand in the 2007 Laurie O'Reilly Cup. She made her test debut off the bench in the first match and made her last appearance for the Wallaroos in the second game in Porirua.
