= Christine Papali'i =

New Zealand rugby union player

- Born: 30 July 1962 (age 64) Auckland, New Zealand
- Height: 1.7 m (5 ft 7 in)

Rugby union career
Provincial / State sides
Years	Team	Apps	(Points)
- Auckland
International career
Years	Team	Apps	(Points)
1989–1992	New Zealand	5	(0)

Christine Papali'i (born 30 July 1962) is a former New Zealand rugby union player. She played for the Black Ferns and Auckland. She made her debut for New Zealand against the California Grizzlies at Christchurch on 22 July 1989.

Papali'i featured at RugbyFest 1990 against the Netherlands, the United States and a World XV. She also played club rugby for Ponsonby.

== Personal life ==
Papali'i is the mother of Phoenix Karaka who plays for the Silver Ferns.
