= Rhonda Kay =

New Zealand rugby union player

- Born: 31 August 1976 (age 50) Dargaville, New Zealand
- Height: 1.80 m (5 ft 11 in)
- Weight: 77 kg (170 lb)

Rugby union career
- Position: Lock
Provincial / State sides
Years	Team	Apps	(Points)
	Waikato		(0)
International career
Years	Team	Apps	(Points)
2000	New Zealand	1	(0)

Rhonda Kay (born 31 August 1976) is a former New Zealand rugby union player.

== Rugby career ==
Kay played for Waikato at provincial level. She was part of the Black Ferns squad that participated at the 2000 Canada Cup at Winnipeg. She made her international debut on 23 September 2000 against hosts, Canada.

In 2001, she was selected for the Black Ferns side to play England in two June tests in New Zealand. She was named as a reserve in both matches but did not run onto the field.
