= Jude Broughton =

New Zealand rugby player

- Born: 3 August 1963 (age 63) Pātea, New Zealand
- Height: 1.63 m (5 ft 4 in)
- Weight: 66 kg (146 lb)

Rugby union career
- Position: Loose forward
International career
Years	Team	Apps	(Points)
1990	New Zealand	1	(0)

Jude Broughton (born 3 August 1963) is a former New Zealand rugby union and touch football player. She debuted for the Black Ferns against the Netherlands on 26 August at Ashburton at RugbyFest 1990. Her sister is fellow Black Fern Florence Broughton.

In 2019 Broughton won the Masters League Crossfit Games in the 55 to 59 age group in Melbourne.
