= Sandy Yates =

- Born: 17 January 1979 (age 47) Auckland, New Zealand
- Height: 1.82 m (6 ft 0 in)

Rugby union career
- Position(s): Wing, Centre
Amateur team(s)
Years	Team	Apps	(Points)
	Manurewa		(0)
–	Ponsonby		
Provincial / State sides
Years	Team	Apps	(Points)
	Counties Manukau		(0)
International career
Years	Team	Apps	(Points)
2001	New Zealand	1	(0)

Sandy Yates (born 17 January 1979) is a former New Zealand rugby union player.

== Rugby career ==
Yates made her debut, and only appearance, for New Zealand on 16 June 2001 against England at Albany, New Zealand.

Yates played club rugby for Manurewa and briefly for Ponsonby. She played provincially for Counties Manukau.
