= Lili Fa'aope =

- Born: 14 September 1964 (age 62)
- Height: 1.65 m (5 ft 5 in)
- Weight: 85 kg (187 lb)

Rugby union career
- Position: Prop
International career
Years	Team	Apps	(Points)
1989–1990	New Zealand	3	(0)

Lili Fa'aope (born 14 September 1964) is a former New Zealand rugby union player.

== Rugby career ==
Fa'aope debuted for New Zealand in their first-ever match against a visiting California Grizzlies team at Christchurch. She featured at RugbyFest 1990 against the Netherlands and a World XV's team. She also made appearances for her Canterbury side at the festival.

== Personal life ==
On her maternal side Fa'aope is related to former All Black Olo Brown, Manu Samoa great Peter Fatialofa and New Zealand league internationals Jeremy Smith and Joe Vagana.
