= Fanny Gelis =

French rugby union player

- Born: 22 March 1977 (age 49)
- Height: 1.56 m (5 ft 1 1/2 in)
- Weight: 60 kg (130 lb; 9 st 6 lb)

Rugby union career
- Position: Hooker
International career
Years	Team	Apps	(Points)
2000-2006	France	48	(-)

Fanny Gelis (born 10 March 1977) is a French female rugby union player. She represented France at the 2002 Women's Rugby World Cup, and 2006 Women's Rugby World Cup, finishing third on both occasions.
