= Lauren Engebretsen =

New Zealand rugby union player

- Born: 12 March 1983 (age 43)

Rugby union career
- Position: Hooker
Amateur team(s)
Years	Team	Apps	(Points)
	Waikato University		(0)
Provincial / State sides
Years	Team	Apps	(Points)
2001–2005	Waikato	16	(25)
International career
Years	Team	Apps	(Points)
2004	New Zealand	3	(0)

Lauren Engebretsen (born 12 March 1983) is a former New Zealand rugby union player.

== Rugby career ==
Engebretsen was one of six new caps in the Black Ferns side that was named for the 2004 Churchill Cup tournament in Canada. She made her test debut on 8 June against Canada at Vancouver. She also featured in the games against the United States and England.

She captained Waikato in the women's Provincial Championship.
