= Margaret McKenzie (rugby union) =

New Zealand rugby player

- Born: 13 February 1970 (age 56) Mosgiel, New Zealand
- Height: 1.82 m (6 ft 0 in)
- Weight: 95 kg (209 lb)

Rugby union career
- Position: Prop
Amateur team(s)
Years	Team	Apps	(Points)
1990–?	Dunedin Pirates	205	(0)
Provincial / State sides
Years	Team	Apps	(Points)
1990–?	Otago	89	(0)
International career
Years	Team	Apps	(Points)
2000, 2005	New Zealand	5	(5)

Margaret McKenzie (born 13 February 1970) is a former New Zealand rugby union player.

== Rugby career ==
=== Playing career ===
McKenzie played club rugby for the Dunedin Pirates and was part of the team that won the inaugural women's banner in 1990.

McKenzie scored a try in her test debut for the Black Ferns against Canada, in Winnipeg on 23 September at the 2000 Canada Cup. She also played against the United States and England.

She played her final games for the Black Ferns at the 2005 Canada Cup in Ottawa. She faced Canada in the group stage before meeting them again in the final, with her side winning the tournament.

=== Coaching career ===
She coached the Dunedin Pirates when they met Alhambra-Union in the Otago and Southland women's final at the University Oval on 1 August 2009.
