= No'o Taru =

- Born: 25 April 1960 Aitutaki, Cook Islands
- Died: 2011 (aged 51)
- Height: 1.55 m (5 ft 1 in)
- Weight: 65 kg (143 lb)

Rugby union career
International career
Years	Team	Apps	(Points)
1990	New Zealand	1	(0)

No'o Taru (née Tekeu, 25 April 1960 – 2011) is a former New Zealand rugby union player. She made her debut for the Black Ferns on 1 September 1990 against a World XV's team at RugbyFest 1990. However, due to incorrect record keeping and lack of official endorsement then, it is unclear how many games she played for the New Zealand XV.

== Personal life and death ==
Taru was married and had five children. She died in 2011 due to cancer.
