= Fa'anati Aniseko =

New Zealand rugby union and sevens player

- Born: 31 March 1989 (age 37)
- Height: 1.65 m (5 ft 5 in)
- Weight: 68 kg (150 lb)

Rugby union career
- Position: Outside Back
Amateur team(s)
Years	Team	Apps	(Points)
	Ponsonby		(0)
	Ardmore Marist		(0)
Provincial / State sides
Years	Team	Apps	(Points)
2005–2008	Auckland	13	(55)
2013–2014	Counties Manukau	17	(55)
International career
Years	Team	Apps	(Points)
2007	New Zealand	2	(5)

Fa'anati Aniseko (born 31 March 1989) is a former New Zealand rugby union and sevens player.

== Rugby career ==
=== XVs ===
Aniseko played club rugby for Ponsonby and Ardmore Marist.

Aniseko was selected for the Black Ferns squad for the 2007 Laurie O'Reilly Cup. She made her Black Ferns test debut as an 18-year-old against Australia on 16 October 2007 at Wanganui. She scored a try on debut 20 seconds after coming off the bench to help her side win 21–10. She made her last international appearance in the second test against the Wallaroos at Porirua.

Aniseko played for Auckland before going on hiatus for six years and reappearing for Counties Manukau. She moved to Australia in 2016.

=== Sevens ===
Aniseko also competed for the Black Ferns sevens team. In 2008, she attended a Black Ferns sevens three-day trial camp that was held in Auckland. She made selection for the sevens side that competed at the 2008 Oceania Sevens Championship in Apia, Samoa. It was a qualifying tournament for the 2009 Rugby World Cup Sevens.
