= Tangaloa Edwards =

New Zealand rugby union player

- Height: 1.63 m (5 ft 4 in)
- Weight: 67 kg (148 lb)

Rugby union career
- Position: Centre
International career
Years	Team	Apps	(Points)
1989	New Zealand	1	(0)

Bridgette Nawina Tangaloa Edwards is a former New Zealand rugby union player.

She made her only appearance for New Zealand when she featured in their first-ever match against the California Grizzlies in 1989. She also played for Ponsonby.
