= Catherine de Jong (rugby union) =

New Zealand rugby union player

- Born: 31 July 1984 (age 42) Rotorua, New Zealand
- Height: 1.64 m (5 ft 5 in)
- Weight: 62 kg (137 lb)

Rugby union career
- Position: Halfback
Provincial / State sides
Years	Team	Apps	(Points)
2003–?	Otago	16	(0)
International career
Years	Team	Apps	(Points)
2005	New Zealand	2	(0)

Catherine de Jong (born 31 July 1984) is a former New Zealand rugby union player.

== Rugby career ==
De Jong was selected for the Black Ferns tour of North America in 2005. She made her international debut against Scotland in their Canada Cup match in Ottawa.

Her last test appearance for the Black Ferns, was against Canada a week later in their 43–3 win. She was not considered for the Canada Cup final against hosts, Canada, due to a shoulder injury she sustained during training.
