= Amy Farr =

New Zealand rugby union player

- Born: 31 May 1982 (age 44) Warkworth, New Zealand
- Height: 1.83 m (6 ft 0 in)
- Weight: 75 kg (165 lb)

Rugby union career
- Position: Lock
Amateur team(s)
Years	Team	Apps	(Points)
	Old Boys University		(0)
Provincial / State sides
Years	Team	Apps	(Points)
2000–2002	North Harbour	9	(0)
2003	Manawatu	4	(0)
2004–2007	Wellington	22	(0)
International career
Years	Team	Apps	(Points)
2007	New Zealand	1	(0)

Amy Farr (née Berthaut; born 31 May 1982) is a former New Zealand rugby union player.

== Rugby career ==
Farr was part of the Wellington Pride squad for the 2006 Women's Provincial Championship season. She is Black Fern Number 147. She was selected in the Black Ferns 26-member squad for their two tests against Australia. Farr made her only appearance for the Black Ferns against the Wallaroos on 20 October 2007 at Porirua. She moved to Switzerland at the end of 2007.

Farr coached the CERN Wildcats women's side. She worked for the European Respiratory Society, helping distribute ventilators for the COVID-19 pandemic.
