= Kamila Wihongi =

New Zealand rugby union player

- Born: 13 March 1982 (age 44)
- Height: 1.7 m (5 ft 7 in)
- Weight: 80 kg (176 lb)

Rugby union career
- Position: Prop
Provincial / State sides
| Years | Team | Apps | (Points) |
| 2000–2008 | Otago | 34 | (10) |
| 2019–2021 | Northland | 18 | (0) |
International career
| Years | Team | Apps | (Points) |
| 2005 | New Zealand | 1 | (0) |

Kamila Wihongi (born 13 March 1982) is a former New Zealand rugby union player.

== Rugby career ==
Wihongi started in her only international appearance for the Black Ferns against Scotland in their Canada Cup match in Ottawa.

Wihongi played club rugby for Kaikohe. She played for Otago from 2000 to 2008. She missed the 2007 provincial season because she underwent a reconstruction surgery on both her knees.

== Personal life ==
Wihongi studied at the Sports Institute of Otago in 2000 and later completed a physical education degree at the University of Otago.

Her sister, Verina, became the first New Zealand woman to compete in taekwondo at the 2004 Summer Olympics in Athens.
