= Nicole Borthwick =

New Zealand rugby union player

- Born: 24 October 1980 (age 46) Rotorua, New Zealand
- Height: 1.6 m (5 ft 3 in)
- Weight: 68 kg (150 lb)

Rugby union career
- Position: Inside Back
Amateur team(s)
| Years | Team | Apps | (Points) |
| | Ponsonby | | (0) |
Provincial / State sides
| Years | Team | Apps | (Points) |
| 1996–1998 | Bay of Plenty | | (0) |
| 1999–2000 | Otago | 18 | (0) |
| 2002–2003 | North Harbour | | (0) |
| 2004–2005 | Auckland | 25 | (76) |
International career
| Years | Team | Apps | (Points) |
| 2005 | New Zealand | 2 | (7) |

Nicole Borthwick (born 24 October 1980) is a former New Zealand rugby union player.

== Rugby career ==
Borthwick played provincial rugby for Bay of Plenty, Otago, North Harbour and Auckland. She also played club rugby for Ponsonby. In 2001, she was a trialist for the Black Ferns and attended a training camp at Takapuna, Auckland.

Borthwick made her international debut for New Zealand on 5 July 2005 against Canada at Ottawa, she kicked a conversion and penalty in her sides 43–3 win. She came off the bench in her final appearance for the side in the Canada Cup final against Canada.

In November 2005, she was named in the Black Ferns wider training squad in preparation for the Rugby World Cup the next year. She was on hiatus from first-class rugby for seven years before making a brief reappearance in 2013.
