= Stacey Lene =

New Zealand rugby union player

- Born: 10 May 1980 (age 46) Burwood, New Zealand
- Height: 1.68 m (5 ft 6 in)
- Weight: 72 kg (159 lb)

Rugby union career
- Position: Utility Back
Amateur team(s)
Years	Team	Apps	(Points)
	Belfast		(0)
Provincial / State sides
Years	Team	Apps	(Points)
2008	Canterbury	7	(5)
International career
Years	Team	Apps	(Points)
2003–2005	New Zealand	7	(35)

Stacey Lene (born 10 May 1980) is a former New Zealand rugby union player.

== Rugby career ==
Lene made her Black Ferns test debut against a World XVs side on 4 October 2003 at Auckland. She played in the second test and made her first test try.

Lene was selected in the Black Ferns team for the 2004 Women's Churchill Cup in Canada. In a warm-up match against Canada, she scored two tries in the first half in her sides 32–5 win. She featured in the 35–0 trouncing of the United States at Calgary. She helped the Black Ferns win the tournament with their victory over England, she scored two tries; her third try was illegally stopped and was awarded as a penalty try.

She made her last two appearances for the Black Ferns at the 2005 Canada Cup in Ottawa. She played the match against Scotland and scored her final try against hosts, Canada. She was not considered for the final against Canada because she had to return home for family reasons.
