= Helen Va'aga =

- Born: 11 August 1977 (age 49)
- Height: 1.69 m (5 ft 7 in)

Rugby union career
- Position: Prop
Provincial / State sides
| Years | Team | Apps | (Points) |
| 2007, 2009 | Auckland | 7 | (0) |
International career
| Years | Team | Apps | (Points) |
| 2002–2006 | New Zealand | 11 | (5) |
Coaching career
- Years: Team
- 2009: Iran women
Medal record
Women's rugby union
Representing New Zealand
Rugby World Cup
| Gold medal – first place | 2002 Spain | Team competition |
| Gold medal – first place | 2006 Canada | Team competition |

Helen Va'aga (born 11 August 1977) is a former New Zealand rugby union player. She competed for New Zealand at the 2002 and 2006 Rugby World Cups.

== Rugby career ==
Va'aga made her international debut for the Black Ferns against Germany at the 2002 Rugby World Cup in Spain. She featured for the Black Ferns against a World XV's team in 2003.

In 2005, she played in a test against England at Eden Park. She was part of the Black Ferns squad that won the 2006 Rugby World Cup.

=== Coaching ===
In 2009, Va'aga coached the Iranian women's team.
