= Florence Broughton =

New Zealand rugby player

- Born: 13 May 1962 (age 64) Hāwera, New Zealand
- Height: 1.68 m (5 ft 6 in)
- Weight: 72 kg (159 lb)

Rugby union career
- Position: Wing
International career
| Years | Team | Apps | (Points) |
| 1990 | New Zealand | 1 | (0) |

Florence Broughton (born 13 May 1962) is a former New Zealand rugby union player. She was a reserve in the Black Ferns first-ever match against the California Grizzlies at Christchurch in 1989 and featured against the Netherlands in RugbyFest 1990.

Her sister is fellow Black Fern Jude Broughton.
