= Paremata-Plimmerton RFC =

Paremata-Plimmerton Rugby Football Club is a rugby union club based in Paremata, a northern suburb of Porirua, New Zealand.

The club was formed in 1959 as a merger of the Paremata and Plimmerton clubs. The Plimmerton club was formed in 1932 and based at what is now the Plimmerton Domain. Paremata was formed later in 1946, taking over a section of the Army Camp which was being dismantled at Ngatitoa Domain on the shores of Porirua Harbour. The amalgamated club adopted Ngatitoa as its headquarters.

Pare-Plim, as the club is more commonly called, returned to the Premier grade of Wellington club rugby in 2014 after a 20-year absence. In 2021 the Club boasts 6 Senior sides including a Premier Women's side and Colts (U21).

The club does boast however one of the largest junior sections in Wellington with over 400 players from Under 6 to Under 13. The club's teams are all given aquatic nicknames. Notably in 2012 the club fielded an all-girls Under 8's team.

Pare-Plim has seen a number of former juniors achieve notable sporting success including All Blacks Christian Cullen and Gary Knight, and English cricketer Ben Stokes.
