= Marina Canterbury =

New Zealand rugby union player

- Born: 11 December 1984 (age 41) Napier, New Zealand
- Height: 1.76 m (5 ft 9 in)
- Weight: 83 kg (183 lb)

Rugby union career
- Position: Number 8
Amateur team(s)
Years	Team	Apps	(Points)
	Kia Toa		(0)
Provincial / State sides
Years	Team	Apps	(Points)
2003–2007	Hawke's Bay	21	(0)
2008–2016	Manawatu	17	(5)
International career
Years	Team	Apps	(Points)
2005	New Zealand	5	(10)

Marina Canterbury (born 11 December 1984) is a former New Zealand rugby union player.

== Rugby career ==
Canterbury was selected for the Black Ferns squad for the 2005 Canada Cup that was held in Ottawa. She started in her test debut on 29 June against Scotland. In her second appearance she scored two of her sides six tries against Canada. She featured in the final against Canada, her side won 32–5.

In October 2005, she was named in the Black Ferns side for a two-test series against England in New Zealand. She played in both games as New Zealand clean swept the series 2–0.
