= Megan Valler =

- Born: 19 February 1981 (age 45) Rockhampton, Queensland
- School: Townsville Grammar School

Rugby union career
- Position: Wing
International career
Years	Team	Apps	(Points)
2007	Australia	2	(0)

Megan Valler (born 19 February 1981) is a former Australian rugby union player. She was selected in Australia's squad for the 2007 O'Reilly Cup against New Zealand. She made her international debut for the Wallaroos in the first test against the Black Ferns in Whanganui. She also featured in the second test in Porirua, it was her final appearance for the side.
