= Sayonara Su'a =

- Born: September 28, 1969 (age 57) Whanganui, New Zealand
- Height: 1.68 m (5 ft 6 in)

Rugby union career
Provincial / State sides
Years	Team	Apps	(Points)
	Auckland		(0)
International career
Years	Team	Apps	(Points)
1996	New Zealand	2	(5)

Sayonara Su'a (born September 28, 1969) is a former New Zealand rugby union player.

== Rugby career ==
Su'a made her debut for New Zealand on 31 August 1996 against Australia at Sydney. She made her only international try for the Black Ferns in their demolition of France in 1996 at Edmonton. She scored one of 17 tries that day in their 109–0 victory.

She briefly coached Messina in the 2000–2001 Serie A season. In 2003, she played in a World XV's team that took on the Black Ferns in Whangārei.
