= Jacquileen Apiata =

- Born: June 10, 1966 (age 60) Invercargill, New Zealand
- Height: 1.7 m (5 ft 7 in)
- Weight: 64 kg (141 lb)

Rugby union career
- Position(s): Fly-half, Centre
Provincial / State sides
Years	Team	Apps	(Points)
	Canterbury		(0)
International career
Years	Team	Apps	(Points)
1991–1995	New Zealand	5	(0)

Jacqui Stewart (née Apiata, born 10 June 1966) is a former New Zealand rugby union player. She played for New Zealand at the inaugural 1991 Women's Rugby World Cup.

== Early life ==
Apiata grew up in Otautau where she attended Otautau School and Central Southland College. She took up rugby while studying at the University of Canterbury.

== Rugby career ==
Apiata played Centre in the Black Ferns first-ever match in 1989 against the California Grizzlies in Christchurch.

At RugbyFest 1990, She played 16 games in 15 days for the University of Canterbury, Canterbury, and the Black Ferns. She later played in the first home and away tests against Australia in 1994 and 1995.

In 2018, Apiata was among several former Black Ferns who received test caps, she was given the first cap.
