= Jennifer Troncy =

French rugby union player

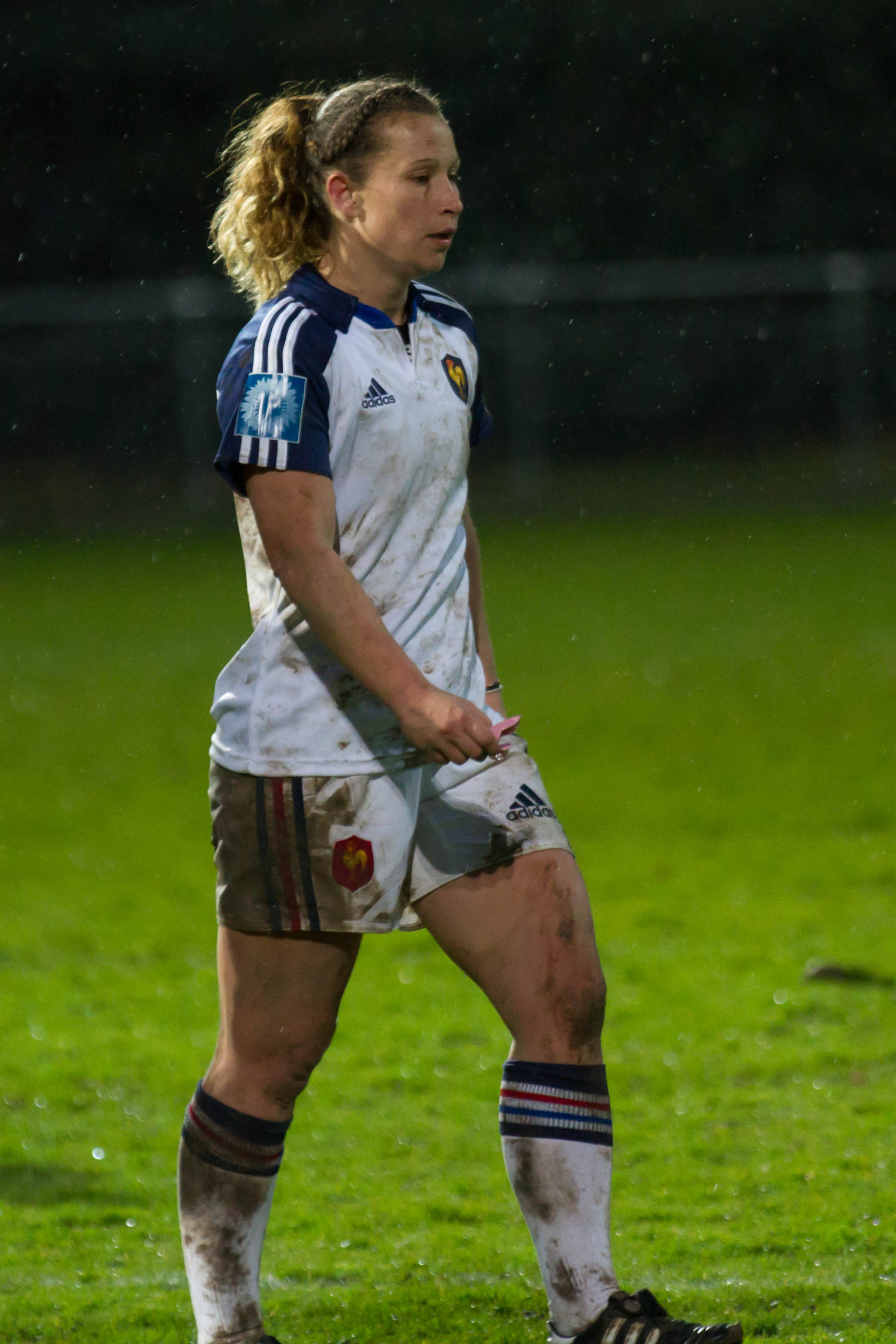
- Born: 26 January 1986 (age 40)
- Height: 1.57 m (5 ft 2 in)
- Weight: 58 kg (128 lb)

Rugby union career
- Position: Scrumhalf
Senior career
Years	Team	Apps	(Points)
- Montpellier
International career
Years	Team	Apps	(Points)
2006–present	France	43	

Jennifer Troncy (born 26 January 1986 in Bagnols-sur-Cèze) is a French rugby union player. She played for France at the 2014 Women's Rugby World Cup. She was a member of the squad that won their fourth Six Nations title in 2014. She was selected as a member of the France women's national rugby sevens team to the 2016 Summer Olympics.
