= Tala Mulipola =

New Zealand rugby player (born 1981)

- Born: 3 June 1981 (age 45)
- Height: 1.79 m (5 ft 10 in)
- Weight: 85 kg (187 lb)

Rugby union career
- Position: Loose forward
Amateur team(s)
Years	Team	Apps	(Points)
1999–2003	Auckland Marist		(0)
Provincial / State sides
Years	Team	Apps	(Points)
1999–?	Auckland	11	(15)
International career
Years	Team	Apps	(Points)
2000–2003	New Zealand	7	(5)

Tala Mulipola (born 3 June 1981) is a former New Zealand rugby union player.

== Rugby career ==
Mulipola played seven tests for the Black Ferns. She made her international debut at the 2000 Canada Cup against hosts, Canada, on 23 September in Winnipeg. She also played in the matches against the United States and England.

In May 2001, Mulipola attended the Black Ferns trials that was held in Auckland. She eventually made the team to play England in two tests in June. She came off the bench when her side narrowly beat the English by five points in the first test at Rotorua. She featured in the Black Ferns dramatic loss to England in the second test at Albany, thus ending her side's ten year unbeaten record.

In 2003, She was part of the Black Ferns team that played two-test matches against the World XV side in New Zealand.
