= Penny Anderson (rugby union) =

Australian rugby player

- Born: 14 January 1977 (age 49) Gunnedah, NSW
- School: Canowindra High School

Rugby union career
- Position: No. 8
International career
Years	Team	Apps	(Points)
2001–2002	Australia	6	(0)

Penny Anderson (born 14 January 1977) is a former Australian rugby union player. She competed for Australia at the 2002 Rugby World Cup in Spain.

Anderson played six test matches for the Wallaroos between 2001 and 2002. She made her international debut for Australia against England in 2001. Her final appearance for the Wallaroos was against Scotland at the 2002 World Cup.
