= Suzy Dawson =

New Zealand rugby union player and coach

- Born: 20 January 1971 (age 55) Te Kōpuru, New Zealand
- Height: 1.67 m (5 ft 6 in)
- Weight: 67 kg (148 lb)
- School: Epsom Girls' Grammar School

Rugby union career
- Position: Hooker
Provincial / State sides
Years	Team	Apps	(Points)
- Northland
International career
Years	Team	Apps	(Points)
1999–2002	New Zealand	4	(5)
Medal record
Representing New Zealand
Women's rugby union
Rugby World Cup
Gold medal – first place	2002 Spain	Team competition

Susan Margaret Dawson (born 20 January 1971) is a New Zealand rugby union coach and former rugby union player. She made her debut for the New Zealand women's national side, the Black Ferns, against Canada on 16 October 1999 at Palmerston North. She was part of the winning New Zealand squad at the 2002 Women's Rugby World Cup.

In 2018, Dawson was appointed coach for the Northland senior women's development team. She has also been the head coach of Pakistan's women's sevens team.
