= Mere Kingi =

New Zealand rugby union player (born 1974)

- Born: 8 May 1974 (age 52) Te Teko, New Zealand
- Height: 1.65 m (5 ft 5 in)
- Weight: 60 kg (132 lb)

Rugby union career
- Position: Wing
Amateur team(s)
Years	Team	Apps	(Points)
1998–?	College Rifles		(0)
Provincial / State sides
Years	Team	Apps	(Points)
1998–2007	Auckland		(0)
International career
Years	Team	Apps	(Points)
2003–2004	New Zealand	5	(10)

Merewaakana (Mere) Kingi (born 8 May 1974) is a former New Zealand rugby union player.

== Rugby career ==
Kingi played five tests for New Zealand. In 2003, she was selected in the Black Ferns team to play a two-test series against a World XVs side. She made her international debut on 4 October against the World XV at Auckland. She scored two tries in the second game to help her side win 38–19.

She was part of the Black Ferns side that won the 2004 Churchill Cup that was held in Canada.

Kingi was named in the Black Ferns wider training group in 2005 as they prepared for the 2006 Rugby World Cup in Canada. She played Sevens for the New Zealand Maori sevens team in 2002 and for the Auckland Sevens team between 1998 and 2002. She was also part of the New Zealand Touch Rugby team from 1996 to 2002.

== Professional career ==
Kingi is a chartered accountant, she was a senior manager at the Bank of New Zealand and also worked for Morgan Stanley, the Royal Bank of Scotland and Barclays. She was elected as an independent member to the New Zealand Maori Rugby Board in 2017.

In 2022, she joined the ASB Bank board as an observer under the Institute of Directors’ Future Director programme. In September 2022, she was appointed as the deputy chief executive finance and support services for the Māori Health Authority.

She was the acting group chief financial officer for Ngāti Awa Group Holdings, and has also served as a director for private and risk advisory with accounting firm Deloitte.
