= Tenia Vaeteru =

- Born: 9 February 1964 (age 62)
- Height: 1.78 m (5 ft 10 in)
- Weight: 75 kg (165 lb)

Rugby union career
- Position: Centre
International career
Years	Team	Apps	(Points)
1990	New Zealand	2	(0)

Tenia Vaeteru (born 9 February 1964) is a former New Zealand rugby union player. She debuted for the Black Ferns against the United States at RugbyFest 1990 at Christchurch, her other appearance was against the World XV's team.
