= Stokes Valley RFC =

NZ rugby union club, based in Stokes Valley

Stokes Valley Rugby Football Club (SVRFC) is a rugby union club based in Stokes Valley, a suburb of the Hutt Valley, New Zealand.

The club was formed in early 1949, during the post-war era of increased settlement in the Hutt Valley. The club started with one team in the Junior 2nd grade, and gained senior status in 1964. The club continued to build in playing numbers until it reached a peak of 11 teams in 1991. In that year, the club's top side defeated University to win promotion to the Senior 1 grade, which was renamed the Premier grade in 1992.

The club held Premier status for four seasons before being relegated during a competition restructure and reduction of the Premier grade from 16 teams to 12. During that time, it played in the 1993 Hardham Cup final, losing to Petone at Athletic Park. Its sole senior success since then has been winning the Senior 1st Ed Chaney Cup in 2008. However, the club's playing numbers have dwindled since the heights of 1991 and it now has only two teams in WRFU competition; the senior side is in the third-tier Senior 2 grade (having been relegated from Senior 1 in 2010) and an Under 85 kg restricted side, plus a Presidents grade team.

The club is based at Delaney Park in Stokes Valley itself, and its playing colours are red and yellow hooped jerseys and socks with black shorts.
