= Pikihuia Ruffell =

New Zealand rugby union player

- Born: 16 February 1983 (age 43) Invercargill, New Zealand
- Height: 1.72 m (5 ft 8 in)
- Weight: 110 kg (243 lb)

Rugby union career
- Position: Wing
Provincial / State sides
Years	Team	Apps	(Points)
2000–2007	Otago	26	(45)
2008	Hawke's Bay	3	(10)
International career
Years	Team	Apps	(Points)
2005	New Zealand	2	(10)

Pikihuia 'Piki' Solomon (born 16 February 1983) is a former New Zealand rugby union player. She is also known as Piki Ruffell.

== Rugby career ==
Solomon scored a try in her test debut for the Black Ferns on 22 October 2005 against England at Auckland. In the second test against England in Hamilton, she scored her last try in her first starting appearance for the side.

Solomon spent seven seasons with Otago before playing for Hawke's Bay. She was regularly compared to Jonah Lomu due to her size and style of play.

In 2008, she bulldozed her way to two first-half tries when she faced her former team, Otago in their Provincial Championship game.
