= Muteremoana Aiatu =

- Born: 11 August 1981 (age 45)
- Height: 1.79 m (5 ft 10 in)

Rugby union career
- Position: Prop
Provincial / State sides
Years	Team	Apps	(Points)
2011–2016	Wellington	39	(55)
International career
Years	Team	Apps	(Points)
2011	New Zealand	1	(0)

Muteremoana Aiatu (born 11 August 1981) is a former New Zealand rugby union player.

Aiatu was named in the Black Ferns squad for their end of year tour of England. She made her debut and only appearance for New Zealand on 29 November 2011 against England at Esher. Aiatu was named in the third and final test but did not play.
