= Valler Tal =

Valley in South Tyrol, Italy

Coordinates: 46°50′33″N 11°37′33″E

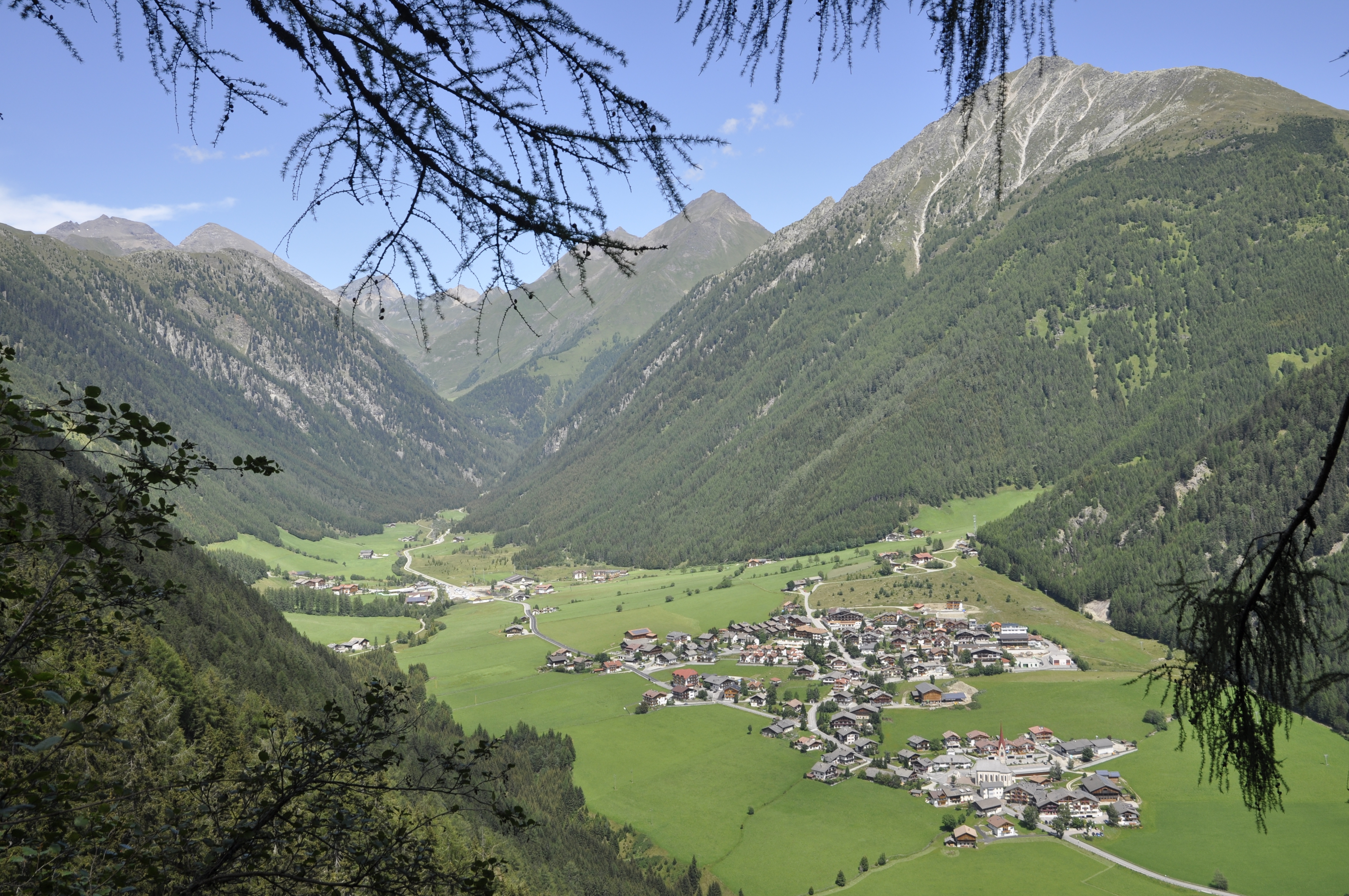

The Valler Tal (also German: Valser Tal; Italian: Val di Valles [ˈval di ˈvalles]) is a valley in the Zillertal Alps in South Tyrol, Italy.
