= Vania Wolfgramm =

New Zealand women's rugby union administrator

Vania Wolfgramm MNZM
- Wolfgramm in 2026
- Born: Vania Nive Hannah Lavea; 26 August 1981 (age 45) Auckland, New Zealand
- Height: 1.73 m (5 ft 8 in)
- School: Onehunga High School
- Notable relative: Justine Lavea (sister)

Rugby union career
- Positions: First five-eighth; Second five-eighth
Provincial / State sides
Years	Team	Apps	(Points)
2007–2009	Auckland	18	(10)
2005	NZ Invitation XV	1	(0)
International career
Years	Team	Apps	(Points)
2003–2007	New Zealand	4	(0)
National sevens team
Years	Team		Comps
2008	New Zealand		

Vania Nive Hannah Wolfgramm MNZM (née Lavea; born 26 August 1981) is a former New Zealand rugby union player. She played for the New Zealand women's national rugby union team between 2003 and 2007. She is now a women's rugby development manager for New Zealand Rugby, the governing body of rugby union in the country, and a television commentator.

== Early life ==
Wolfgramm was born in New Zealand. Her parents came from the villages of Safotu on Savai'i islands and Lauli'i on Upolo island in Samoa. She attended Onehunga High School in Onehunga, a suburb of Auckland. She made her international debut for New Zealand on 11 October 2003 against a World XV at Whangārei. She played for the Black Ferns and the Black Ferns sevens.

== Career ==
Wolfgramm joined New Zealand Rugby in March 2012 as a women's rugby development officer for the Blues region. At that time, she was the sole employee working on women's rugby. By 2020, that had increased to seven. In 2020, she became Game Development Manager – Women's Rugby. She has played a leading role in developing the Pacific Aotearoa Cup tournament, which aims to expand opportunities for women of Samoan, Tongan, Cook Islands and Māori origin to play rugby. In 2019 she organized the New Zealand Women’s Rugby Invitational Tournament (NZWRIT) in Auckland, which attracted approximately 1100 participants of all age groups. She coaches the Auckland Samoa women's team.

Since she joined New Zealand Rugby there has been a marked increase in the number of women and girls playing rugby. In part this is due to increased coverage on television. Wolfgramm is a commentator for Sky Sport. In 2019, she was one of 16 people worldwide chosen to take part in a global sports monitoring programme in the USA, organised by the US Department of State and ESPN. She was mentored by Stacey Allaster, former chair and CEO of the Women's Tennis Association (WTA). In 2020 she initiated the first women-only rugby educator programme, known as Ako Wāhine. This aims to build a confident and competent network of women to develop and deliver female-specific rugby developments and programmes.

In the 2026 King’s Birthday Honours, Wolfgramm was appointed a Member of the New Zealand Order of Merit, for services to rugby.

== Personal life ==
Wolfgramm is married with three children. She is the older sister of fellow Black Fern, Justine Lavea.
