= Barbara Chittock =

New Zealand rugby union player

- Born: 27 February 1985 (age 41) Invercargill, New Zealand
- Height: 1.56 m (5 ft 1 in)
- Weight: 68 kg (150 lb)

Rugby union career
- Position: First Five-Eighths
Provincial / State sides
Years	Team	Apps	(Points)
2005	NZ Invitation XV	1	(0)
2007–2009	Canterbury	18	(25)
International career
Years	Team	Apps	(Points)
2009	New Zealand	1	(0)

Barbara Chittock (born 27 February 1985) is a former New Zealand rugby union player.

== Rugby career ==
Chittock played provincially for Canterbury. She led Canterbury against Otago in their provincial clash, her twin, Rebecca, started at centre for Otago in September 2009. She featured against Hawke's Bay and scored a try in their 55–3 semifinal win at Rugby Park in Christchurch.

In November 2009, she was later named in the Black Ferns 26-member squad for their three-match tour of England. She made her only Black Ferns appearance on 14 November 2009 against an England A side at Esher.

Chittock was selected for the Black Ferns training squad in April 2010 in preparation for the Rugby World Cup in England later that year.
