= Anika Tiplady =

- Born: 21 August 1980 (age 46)
- Height: 1.7 m (5 ft 7 in)

Rugby union career
- Position: Centre
Provincial / State sides
Years	Team	Apps	(Points)
2007	Manawatu	5	(25)
2009, 2012	Canterbury	11	(24)
2013	Otago	4	(53)
International career
Years	Team	Apps	(Points)
2007, 2009	New Zealand	3	(18)

Anika Tiplady (born 21 August 1980) is a former New Zealand rugby union player. She debuted for the Black Ferns on 16 October 2007 against Australia at Wanganui.

== Biography ==
Tiplady was born and raised in Christchurch and is of Māori descent from the Ngāi Tahu iwi. She graduated from the University of Otago with a Bachelor of Medicine, Bachelor of Surgery degree.

In May 2008, Tiplady was part of the NZ Army Women's team that played the British Army as part of their Centenary Tour of New Zealand.

Tiplady was named in the Black Ferns squad to travel to England for a three-match tour in 2012.
