= Justine Lavea =

- Born: 10 July 1984 (age 42)
- Height: 1.75 m (5 ft 9 in)
- Weight: 74 kg (163 lb; 11 st 9 lb)

Rugby union career
- Position: Flanker
Provincial / State sides
| Years | Team | Apps | (Points) |
| 2015 | Counties Manukau | | |
| 2006-? | Auckland | 50 | |
International career
| Years | Team | Apps | (Points) |
| 2004–2015 | New Zealand | 34 | (30) |
National sevens team
| Years | Team | | Comps |
| 2007-Present | New Zealand 7s | | |
Medal record
Representing New Zealand
Women's rugby union
Rugby World Cup
| Gold medal – first place | 2010 England | Team competition |
Sevens World Cup
| Silver medal – second place | 2009 Dubai | Team competition |

Justine Lavea (born 10 July 1984) is a former rugby union player. She represented New Zealand internationally, and Auckland provincially.

== Biography ==
In 2000, Lavea made her provincial debut for Auckland at the age of 16.

Lavea represented New Zealand at the 2009 Rugby World Cup Sevens in Dubai. She was a member of the 2010 Rugby World Cup champion side, she started in the final against England. She was also selected for the squad to the 2014 Rugby World Cup in France.

Lavea was named in the squad to tour Canada for the inaugural 2015 Women's Rugby Super Series. She is the younger sister of fellow Black Fern, Vania Wolfgramm.
