= Amanda Murphy (rugby union) =

- Born: 20 September 1985 (age 41) Invercargill, New Zealand
- Height: 1.8 m (5 ft 11 in)

Rugby union career
- Position: Blindside Flanker
Provincial / State sides
Years	Team	Apps	(Points)
2004–2012	Canterbury	26	(65)
International career
Years	Team	Apps	(Points)
2009–2011	New Zealand	2	(0)

Amanda Murphy (born 20 September 1985) is a former New Zealand rugby union player.

In 2009, Murphy had made an appearance for the Black Ferns against an England A team at Esher. Murphy made her international debut for New Zealand on 26 November 2011 against England at London.

Murphy has a Bachelor of Applied Science and a Bachelor of Sport and Exercise Science degree.

Murphy is the Black Ferns Sevens lead strength and conditioning coach. Prior to this role she was the Assistant Strength and Conditioning Coach for the Black Ferns in 2022. She was the Women's Rugby High Performance Manager for Canterbury Rugby.
