= Teresa Te Tamaki =

- Born: 31 December 1981 (age 44) Rotorua, New Zealand
- Height: 1.67 m (5 ft 6 in)
- Weight: 73 kg (161 lb)

Rugby union career
- Position(s): Inside Back, Hooker
Provincial / State sides
Years	Team	Apps	(Points)
2007–2011	Auckland	23	(5)
2012–2015	Waikato	25	(20)
International career
Years	Team	Apps	(Points)
2007–2015	New Zealand	10	(0)
National sevens team
Years	Team		Comps
2009	New Zealand		

Teresa Te Tamaki (born 31 December 1981) is a former New Zealand rugby union player.

== Biography ==
Te Tamaki became the Director of Lifestyle Physiotherapy in 2015. She represented New Zealand in 15s and sevens before retiring in 2016. Her cousins are New Zealand Sevens players Isaac and Terina Te Tamaki.

Te Tamaki made her Black Ferns debut against Australia in 2007 at Porirua. She represented the Black Ferns sevens at the 2009 Rugby World Cup Sevens in Dubai. She was named in the Black Ferns tour of England in 2011 and featured in all three games. Te Tamaki faced England again in 2012, she came off the bench in the 8–17 and 23–32 losses.

Te Tamaki made her last appearance for the Black Ferns at the 2015 Women's Rugby Super Series in Canada. The series would be her first international tests as a Hooker. She came off the bench in the 40–22 victory over hosts, Canada. Te Tamaki finally recorded a win against world champions England in the 26–7 win in Calgary. Then she helped defeat the United States 47–14 in her last appearance.
