= Kelani Matapo =

- Born: February 3, 1983 (age 43) Cook Islands
- Height: 1.83 m (6 ft 0 in)

Rugby union career
- Position: Lock
Amateur team(s)
Years	Team	Apps	(Points)
- Auckland Marist
Provincial / State sides
Years	Team	Apps	(Points)
- Auckland
International career
Years	Team	Apps	(Points)
2011	New Zealand	1	(0)

Kelani Matapo (born 3 February 1983) is a former rugby union and netball player. She made her debut and only appearance for the Black Ferns on 29 November 2011 against England at Esher, England.

Prior to making the Black Ferns, Matapo represented the Cook Islands in netball at the 2010 Commonwealth Games.

== Personal life ==
Matapo was born and raised in Titikaveka in the Cook Islands. Her father was Cook Islands High Commissioner to New Zealand from 2011 to 2016.
