= Emma Jensen =

NZ international rugby union player

- Born: Emma Marie Jensen; 25 November 1977 (age 48) Masterton, New Zealand
- Height: 1.61 m (5 ft 3 1/2 in)
- Weight: 66 kg (146 lb; 10 st 6 lb)

Rugby union career
- Position: Halfback
Provincial / State sides
Years	Team	Apps	(Points)
1999–2003	Waikato		(0)
2004–2017	Auckland	82	(452)
2018–2022	Hawke's Bay	32	(24)
International career
Years	Team	Apps	(Points)
2002–2015	New Zealand	49	(58)
Medal record
Women's rugby union
Representing New Zealand
Rugby World Cup
Gold medal – first place	2002 Spain	Team competition
Gold medal – first place	2006 Canada	Team competition
Gold medal – first place	2010 England	Team competition

Emma Jensen (born 25 November 1977) is a former rugby union player for New Zealand and Auckland. She was a member of three successful Rugby World Cup campaigns in 2002, 2006, and 2010. She also competed at the 2014 World Cup.

== Rugby career ==
Jensen first started playing rugby as a high school student at Central Hawke's Bay College. Jensen made 49 test appearances for the Black Ferns between 2002 and 2015. She made her international debut against Germany at the 2002 Rugby World Cup in Spain.

In 2003, She featured in two tests against a World XVs side in Auckland and Whangārei. Her side won both games convincingly.

She made the Black Ferns squad again for the 2006 Women's Rugby World Cup that was held in Canada. She scored 20 points in her sides semifinal win against France at the tournament.

In 2007, She played two tests against the Wallaroos. She kicked two penalties in her sides 21–10 victory in the first match. She also made an appearance in the second test.

Jensen was named in the 2014 Women's Rugby World Cup squad. In 2015, she made the squad to tour Canada for the inaugural Women's Rugby Super Series.
