= Wellington Rugby Football Union =

Governing body of rugby union in the province of Wellington

- Sport: Rugby union
- Jurisdiction: Wellington Region
- Abbreviation: WRFU
- Founded: 1879; 147 years ago
- Affiliation: New Zealand Rugby
- Regional affiliation: Wellington Hurricanes
- Headquarters: Wellington

Official website
- www.wrfu.co.nz
- (New Zealand)

The Wellington Rugby Football Union (known as the Wellington Lions for competition reasons) are a New Zealand governing body of rugby union in the New Zealand province of Wellington Region. The main stadium is Hnry Stadium (formerly named Sky Stadium) which is located in Wellington. The union also represents the Wellington Lions, which is professional rugby union team who compete in the National Provincial Championship competition and contest for the Ranfurly Shield. Before 2006 the Lions competed in the original National Provincial Championship.

== Super Rugby ==
Players from Wellington who are eligible to play in the Super Rugby generally play for the Hurricanes, and traditionally contribute the core of the Hurricanes squad. This position is largely due to the Wellington basing of the Hurricanes. Further, Manawatu and Hawke's Bay, two Hurricane provinces and prolific talent producers, had long been mired in the second half of the original National Provincial Championship, allowing Wellington to lure the better players of these provinces with ease (Christian Cullen from Manawatu for example). The reorganisation of provincial rugby in 2006 brought all three provinces into the National Provincial Championship.

== National representative rugby ==
The senior Wellington representative team, the Wellington Lions play in the National Provincial Championship, which replaced the original National Provincial Championship in 2006 as the Air New Zealand Cup. The Lions have won the provincial competition six times since its inception in 1976. The titles came in 1978, 1981, 1986, 2000, 2022, and 2024. They also won the second tier competition, the Championship, in 2017. Their colours are gold and black as shown on the Lions jersey. The Lions play their home games at the Hnry Stadium (formerly named Sky Stadium), previously playing at Athletic Park until 1999. Even with an All-Star backline in the late 1990s including Christian Cullen, Tana Umaga, Jonah Lomu and Alama Ieremia what was a superb team on paper never lived up to expectations and Wellington became known for its inconsistency. The Lions side have made it all the way to the grand final in seven times out of the last ten years (2004–2014), losing to Auckland in 2003, to Canterbury in 2004, to Waikato in 2006, Auckland in 2007, Canterbury in 2008, 2009 and most recently 2013. In 2014 Wellington lost a record nine straight losses and were relegated to the Mitre10 Cup Championship 2015.

== Ranfurly Shield ==
The Ranfurly Shield, colloquially known as the 'Log o' Wood', is perhaps the most prestigious trophy in New Zealand domestic rugby. First played for in 1904, the Ranfurly Shield is based on a challenge system, rather than a league or knockout competition as with most football trophies. The holding union must defend the Shield in home matches, and if a challenger defeats them, they become the new holder of the Shield.

Wellington won the first ever shield challenge winning it from Auckland in 1904 and defended it for 4 matches before losing it back to Auckland in 1905. It wouldn't be until 1914 when Wellington would get the shield back by winning it off Taranaki. This marked the longest time Wellington have held the shield successfully defending it for 15 matches until losing it again to Southland in 1920. They beat Southland a year later to regain the shield before promptly losing to Hawkes Bay after only 2 matches. Wellington held the shield for only one match in 1930 and after losing it to Canterbury they would not regain the shield until 1953. Up until the 1980s Wellington had short stints defending the shield but after losing it to Canterbury in 1982 it was to prove elusive. Wellington suffered 10 unsuccessful challenges for the Ranfurly Shield until they took it off Auckland in 2008, scoring five tries in a 27–0 victory, on the weekend of the Auckland Union's 125th anniversary.

Wellington lost the shield to Canterbury on 29 August, losing 36–14 at the then Westpac Stadium. Canterbury then held the shield for 4 defences (over 8 weeks) before losing to Southland on 22 October. It is currently held by Waikato who defeated Hawke's Bay on 9 October 2015 by 36–30.

== All Blacks ==
- Grant Batty - 1972
- Stu Wilson - 1976
- Bernie Fraser - 1979
- Allan Hewson - 1979
- Scott Crichton – 1983
- Murray Pierce – 1984
- John Gallagher - 1986
- Jon Preston – 1991
- Norm Hewitt – 1993
- Jonah Lomu – 1994
- Alama Ieremia – 1994
- Christian Cullen – 1996
- Tana Umaga – 1997
- Filo Tiatia – 2000
- Jerry Collins – 2001
- Rodney So'oialo – 2002
- Ma'a Nonu – 2003
- Piri Weepu – 2004
- Conrad Smith – 2005
- Neemia Tialata – 2005
- Ross Filipo – 2007
- John Schwalger – 2007
- Cory Jane – 2008
- Hosea Gear – 2008
- Tamati Ellison - 2009
- Victor Vito – 2010
- Julian Savea – 2012
- Dane Coles – 2012
- Jeremy Thrush – 2013
- Jeffrey Toomaga-Allen – 2013
- TJ Perenara – 2014
- Ardie Savea – 2016
- Vaea Fifita - 2017
- Asafo Aumua - 2017
- Matt Proctor - 2018
- Peter Umaga-Jensen - 2020
- Billy Proctor - 2024
- Ruben Love - 2024
- Peter Lakai - 2024
- Du'Plessis Kirifi - 2025

== International matches ==
Wellington has played a number of times against touring international rugby teams. Wellington drew with the British and Irish Lions in 1888 and beat them in 1908, 1930 and 1966 . They have also played other international sides including South Africa, who were beaten in 1965. The Bill Freeman coached Wellington side defeated the Springboks 23–6, arguably the finest moment in Wellington rugby history.

Full results for Wellington against international touring sides: 1882 lost to New South Wales 2–14 1882 lost to New South Wales 0–8 1886 beat New South Wales 7–0 1888 drew with British team 3–3 1894 beat New South Wales 9–5 1896 beat Queensland 49–7 1901 beat New South Wales 17–16 1905 beat Australia 23–7 (combined team with Wairarapa and Horowhenua 1908 beat Anglo-Welsh 19–13 1921 lost to South Africa 3–8 1921 beat New South Wales 16–8 1923 beat New South Wales 29–16 (combined team with Manawatu) 1925 beat New South Wales 20–8 (combined team with Manawatu and Horowhenua) 1930 beat British Lions 12–8 1931 beat Australia 15–8 1937 lost to South Africa 0–29 1946 lost to Australia 15–16 1950 lost to British Isles 6–12 1956 lost to South Africa 6–8 1959 lost to British Isles 6–21 1963 lost to England 9–14 1965 beat South Africa 23–6 1966 beat British Isles 20–6 1969 lost to Wales 6–14 1971 lost to British Isles 9–47 1973 beat England 25–16 1975 lost to Scotland 25–36 1977 lost to British Isles 6–13 1979 lost to France 9–14 1980 beat Fiji 24–8

== Local club rugby ==
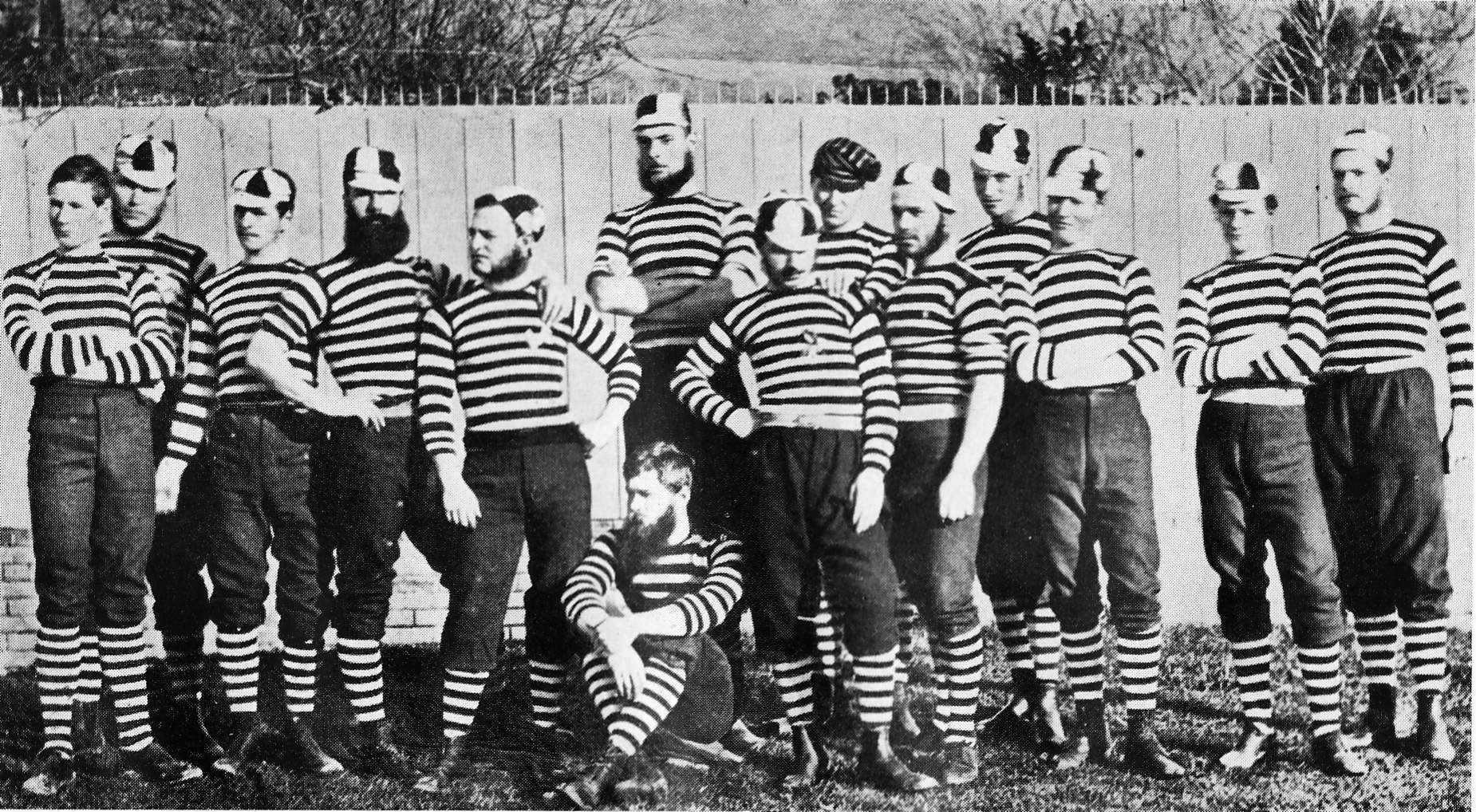
The Wellington RFU team of 1875

Club rugby is a large part of Wellington rugby. 18 clubs currently comprise the Wellington union and all contribute at least one team to the club competitions. The premier trophy in Wellington club rugby is the Jubilee Cup, which was won in 2012 by Marist St Pat's. Petone are the club with the most Jubilee Cup successes having won the title 22 times.

Years in parentheses are when the current club was formed, though many are amalgamations of previously extant clubs. For example, Oriental-Rongotai claim their heritage back to the formation of the Oriental club in 1888 even though the current club was formed in 1969.

Wellington FC is New Zealand's oldest continuous club.

- Avalon RFC (1980) (Lower Hutt)
- Old Boys University (1991) (Wellington)
- Eastbourne RFC (1921) (Lower Hutt)
- Hutt Old Boys-Marist RFC (1992) (Lower Hutt)
- Johnsonville RFC (1900) (Wellington)
- Marist-St Pat's RFC (1971) (Wellington)
- Northern United RFC (1989) (Porirua)
- Oriental-Rongotai FC (1969) (Wellington)
- Paremata-Plimmerton RFC (1959) Porirua)
- Petone Rugby Club (1885) (Lower Hutt)
- Poneke FC (1883) (Wellington)
- Stokes Valley RFC (1949) (Lower Hutt)
- Tawa RFC (1947) (Wellington)
- Upper Hutt Rams RFC (2014) (Upper Hutt)
- Wainuiomata RFC (1946) (Lower Hutt)
- Wellington FC (1871) (Wellington)
- Western Suburbs RFC (1983) (Wellington)

Wellington club rugby is contested over the following grades, following a change to the structure:

- Premier – Criteria based entry into the Swindale Shield with 14 clubs currently competing. The top 8 at the end of the Swindale competition go through to the Jubilee Cup, the remaining six go to the Hardham Cup.
- Premier Reserve – Contested by the 14 'B' teams of the Swindale clubs for the Harper Lock Shield. The top 2 eligible sides at the end of that round go up to the Hardham Cup (eligible in that their Premier sides qualify for the Jubilee Cup), the remaining 12 contest the Ed Chaney and HD Morgan Memorial Cups
- First Grade – Open entry grade. Clubs may enter more than one side in this competition. The first round is played for the Thompson Memorial Trophy, the second round for the Johnsonville Centeniumm Cup.
- Women's Premier – Open entry Women's grade. First round is played for the Fleurs Trophy, the second for the Victoria Tavern Trophy

Remaining grades include age-restricted (Under 21 years), weight-restricted (Under 85 kg), Reserve grade, and the non-competition presidents grade.

High School rugby is organised by College Sport Wellington, with open-age/weight (Premier), weight-restricted (Under 80 kg, 65 kg, and 55 kg), and age-restricted (Under 15 years) for boys, and an open Girls grade. Each grade then comprises several divisions.

== Championship winners ==
=== Wellington senior club championships ===
Wellington senior club championship winners since 1880:

- 1880 Athletic
- 1881 No Club Championship contested
- 1882 Athletic
- 1883 Wellington and Greytown
- 1884 Athletic
- 1885 Wellington
- 1886 Poneke
- 1887 Poneke
- 1888 Poneke
- 1889 Poneke
- 1890 Wellington
- 1891 Athletic
- 1892 Poneke
- 1893 Poneke
- 1894 Poneke
- 1895 Petone
- 1896 Melrose
- 1897 Melrose
- 1898 Melrose
- 1899 Petone
- 1900 Melrose
- 1901 Wellington
- 1902 Melrose
- 1903 Poneke
- 1904 Petone
- 1905 Petone
- 1906 Petone
- 1907 Petone
- 1908 Melrose
- 1909 Poneke
- 1910 Oriental
- 1911 Athletic
- 1912 Athletic
- 1913 Athletic
- 1914 Athletic and Wellington
- 1915 Athletic
- 1916 Petone
- 1917 Petone
- 1918 Poneke
- 1919 Poneke
- 1920 Petone
- 1921 Poneke
- 1922 Petone
- 1923 Petone
- 1924 Petone
- 1925 Poneke
- 1926 Athletic
- 1927 Wellington College Old Boys
- 1928 Victoria University College

=== Jubilee Cup winners ===
The Jubilee Cup has been played for since 1929, with the winners being:

- 1929 Victoria University College
- 1930 Petone
- 1931 Hutt
- 1932 Poneke
- 1933 Wellington College Old Boys
- 1934 Hutt
- 1935 Petone
- 1936 Athletic
- 1937 Athletic
- 1938 Petone
- 1939 Wellington
- 1940 Athletic
- 1941 Athletic
- 1942 Petone
- 1943 Poneke-Oriental
- 1944 Poneke-Oriental
- 1945 Athletic
- 1946 Victoria University College
- 1947 Wellington
- 1948 Marist Bros Old Boys
- 1949 Petone/St Pat’s Old Boys
- 1950 Marist Bros Old Boys
- 1951 Poneke
- 1952 Victoria University College
- 1953 Victoria University College
- 1954 Victoria University College
- 1955 Onslow
- 1956 Petone
- 1957 Petone
- 1958 Victoria University College
- 1959 Petone
- 1960 Marist Bros Old Boys
- 1961 Petone
- 1962 Marist Bros Old Boys/Onslow
- 1963 Marist Bros Old Boys
- 1964 Marist Bros Old Boys/ Victoria University College
- 1965 Athletic
- 1966 Victoria University College
- 1967 Petone
- 1968 Petone
- 1969 Petone
- 1970 Petone
- 1971 Petone
- 1972 Wellington/Athletic
- 1973 Petone
- 1974 Petone
- 1975 Poneke
- 1976 Petone
- 1977 Athletic
- 1978 Marist St Pat’s/Wellington
- 1979 Marist St Pat’s
- 1980 Petone
- 1981 Marist St Pat’s
- 1982 Wellington/Petone
- 1983 Wellington
- 1984 Marist St Pat’s
- 1985 Wellington
- 1986 Petone
- 1987 Wellington
- 1988 Marist St Pat’s
- 1989 Petone
- 1990 Petone
- 1991 Hutt Old Boys
- 1992 Petone
- 1993 Petone
- 1994 Marist St Pat’s
- 1995 Marist St Pat’s
- 1996 Poneke
- 1997 Marist St Pat’s
- 1998 Western Suburbs
- 1999 Marist St Pat’s
- 2000 Petone
- 2001 Marist St Pat’s
- 2002 Marist St Pat’s
- 2003 Poneke
- 2004 Northern United
- 2005 Petone
- 2006 Northern United
- 2007 Hutt Old Boys Marist
- 2008 Marist St Pat's/Northern United
- 2009 Marist St Pat’s
- 2010 Northern United
- 2011 Oriental-Rongotai
- 2012 Marist St Pat's
- 2013 Tawa
- 2014 Hutt Old Boys Marist
- 2015 Old Boys University
- 2016 Tawa
- 2017 Old Boys University
- 2018 Old Boys University
- 2019 Northern United
- 2020 Old Boys University
- 2021 Tawa
- 2022 Northern United
- 2023 Oriental-Rongotai
- 2024 Old Boys University
- 2025 Hutt Old Boys Marist

=== Recent Jubilee Cup finals ===
- 2026 - Petone 18-10 Hutt Old Boys-Marist
- 2025 - Hutt Old Boys-Marist 29-22 Tawa
- 2024 - Old Boys University 27-21 Tawa
- 2023 - Oriental-Rongotai 34-21 Paramata Plimmerton
- 2022 - Northern United 23-20 Petone
- 2021 - Tawa 36-7 Marist St Pat's

== Jersey ==
Main sponsor is Stonewood Homes. Apparel is supplied by Paladin. Other major sponsors include:

- Rutherford & Bond Toyota, Ricoh, Tui, Burger King

== Women's rugby ==
Wellington has a women's team that are part of the Women's Provincial Championship, called the Wellington Pride. Wellington Pride is the only team aside from Auckland to have won the women's championship.
