= List of England women's national rugby union players =

This article represents a list of people who have played for the England women's national rugby union team, in the order that they received their first cap. The list only includes players who have played in an official test match.

== 1987–1989 ==
England's international rugby capped players
No.	Name	Position	Date of first cap	Opposition
1	Karen Almond	Fly-half	5 April 1987	vs. Wales at Pontypool
2	Pip Atkinson	Wing	5 April 1987	vs. Wales at Pontypool
3	Sally Cockerill	Flanker	5 April 1987	vs. Wales at Pontypool
4	Debbie Francis	Wing	5 April 1987	vs. Wales at Pontypool
5	Chris Gurney	Centre	5 April 1987	vs. Wales at Pontypool
6	Carol Isherwood	Number 8	5 April 1987	vs. Wales at Pontypool
7	Tricia King	Lock	5 April 1987	vs. Wales at Pontypool
8	Suzy Hill	Scrum-half	5 April 1987	vs. Wales at Pontypool
9	Jane Pauley	Prop	5 April 1987	vs. Wales at Pontypool
10	Nicky Ponsford	Hooker	5 April 1987	vs. Wales at Pontypool
11	Sam Robson	Centre	5 April 1987	vs. Wales at Pontypool
12	Sally Treadwell	Prop	5 April 1987	vs. Wales at Pontypool
13	Claire Vyvyan	Centre	5 April 1987	vs. Wales at Pontypool
14	Jayne Watts	Prop	5 April 1987	vs. Wales at Pontypool
15	Liz Whalley	Lock	5 April 1987	vs. Wales at Pontypool
16	Pat O'Brian	Centre	5 April 1987	vs. Wales at Pontypool
17	Deirdre Mills	Wing	5 April 1987	vs. Wales at Pontypool
18	Alice Jenkinson	Lock	24 April 1988	vs. Wales at Newport
19	Emma Mitchell	Scrum-half	24 April 1988	vs. Wales at Newport
20	Janis Ross	Flanker	24 April 1988	vs. Wales at Newport
21	Cheryl Stennett	Wing	24 April 1988	vs. Wales at Newport
22	Heather Sykes	Centre	24 April 1988	vs. Wales at Newport
23	Gill Burns	Number 8	16 October 1988	vs. Sweden at Waterloo
24	Mary Forsyth	Number 8	16 October 1988	vs. Sweden at Waterloo
25	Jane Mitchell	Full-back	16 October 1988	vs. Sweden at Waterloo
26	Fiona Reynolds	Prop	16 October 1988	vs. Sweden at Waterloo
27	Helen Thompson	Hooker	16 October 1988	vs. Sweden at Waterloo
28	Jill Shapland	Prop	12 February 1989	vs. Wales at Molesey
29	Heather Stirrup	Lock	12 February 1989	vs. Wales at Molesey
30	Sarah Wenn	Lock	12 February 1989	vs. Wales at Molesey

== 1990–1999 ==
England's international rugby capped players
No.	Name	Position	Date of first cap	Opposition
31	Jane Coats	Prop	11 February 1990	vs. Wales at Neath
32	Sue Wachholz-Dorrington	Hooker	11 February 1990	vs. Wales at Neath
33	Sandy Ewing	Prop	21 October 1990	vs. Netherlands at Utrecht
34	Fiona Hackett	Hooker	21 October 1990	vs. Netherlands at Utrecht
35	Giselle Mather (née Prangnell)	Fly-half	21 October 1990	vs. Netherlands at Utrecht
36	Maxine Edwards	Prop	24 March 1991	vs. Wales at Waterloo
37	Jacquie Edwards	Lock	9 February 1992	vs. Wales at Cardiff
38	Val Blackett	Wing	11 April 1992	vs. Netherlands
39	Annie Cole	Wing	11 April 1992	vs. Netherlands
40	Jenny Chambers	Number 8	14 February 1993	vs. Wales at Northampton
41	Genevieve Shore	Number 8	14 February 1993	vs. Wales at Northampton
42	Emma Scourfield	Prop	8 June 1993	vs. United States at Toronto
43	Janice Byford	Prop	10 June 1993	vs. Canada at Ajax
44	Helen Harding	Scrum-half	12 June 1993	vs. Wales at Toronto
45	Ailish O'Kelly	Wing	12 June 1993	vs. Wales at Toronto
46	Caroline Cox		19 December 1993	vs. Italy
47	Jane Gregory	Prop	19 December 1993	vs. Italy
48	Julie Potter	Hooker	19 December 1993	vs. Italy
49	Paula George	Full-back	13 February 1994	vs. Wales at Bridgend
50	Charlie Bronks	Prop	11 April 1994	vs. Russia at Boroughmuir
51	Kathy Jenn	Number 8	11 April 1994	vs. Russia at Boroughmuir
52	Karen Henderson	Lock	11 April 1994	vs. Russia at Boroughmuir
53	Susie Appleby	Scrum-half	18 December 1994	vs. Netherlands at Loftus Road
54	Helen Clayton	Flanker	18 December 1994	vs. Netherlands at Loftus Road
55	Helen Hulme	Full-back	18 December 1994	vs. Netherlands at Loftus Road
56	Jayne Molyneux	Wing	18 December 1994	vs. Netherlands at Loftus Road
57	Andrea Wallace	Centre	18 December 1994	vs. Netherlands at Loftus Road
58	Sam Dale	Hooker	18 December 1994	vs. Netherlands at Loftus Road
59	Terri Siwek	Lock	18 December 1994	vs. Netherlands at Loftus Road
60	Lisette Mayhew	Wing	12 February 1995	vs. Wales at Sale
61	Julie Twigg	Centre	4 February 1996	vs. Wales at Leicester
62	Gillian Jew	Lock	18 February 1996	vs. France at Villard-Bonnot
63	Sonya Thomas	Hooker	3 March 1996	vs. Scotland at Meggetland
64	Claire Green	Lock	5 January 1997	vs. Spain at Leeds
65	Jenny Smith	Prop	5 January 1997	vs. Spain at Leeds
66	Sarah Robertson	Flanker	5 January 1997	vs. Spain at Leeds
67	Nicky Coffin	Flanker	9 February 1997	vs. Ireland at Limerick
68	Chris Diver	Full-back	9 February 1997	vs. Ireland at Limerick
69	Kate Knight	Centre	9 March 1997	vs. Wales at Worcester
70	Ann O'Flynn	Hooker	2 April 1997	vs. Netherlands at Nice
72	Nicky Crawford	Wing	7 December 1997	vs. Spain
73	Sue Day	Wing	7 December 1997	vs. Spain
74	Assunta de Biase	Centre	7 December 1997	vs. Spain
75	Claire Frost	Number 8	7 December 1997	vs. Spain
76	Jo Poore	Hooker	7 December 1997	vs. Spain
77	Claire Antcliffe		7 December 1997	vs. Spain
78	Sonia Harris	Centre	7 December 1997	vs. Spain
79	Teresa O'Reilly	Prop	21 March 1998	vs. Scotland at Stewart's Melville
80	Georgia Stevens	Flanker	21 March 1998	vs. Scotland at Stewart's Melville
81	Linda Uttley	Lock	21 March 1998	vs. Scotland at Stewart's Melville
82	Trudi Collins	Centre	5 May 1998	vs. Ireland at Worcester
83	Jo Yapp	Scrum-half	5 May 1998	vs. Ireland at Worcester
84	Teresa Andrews (née Bowden)	Lock	28 February 1999	vs. Scotland at Richmond
85	Nessa Huxford	Prop	28 February 1999	vs. Scotland at Richmond
86	Emily Cooke	Wing	10 April 1999	vs. Wales at Swansea
87	Jenny Lyne	Flanker	10 April 1999	vs. Wales at Swansea

== 2000–2009 ==
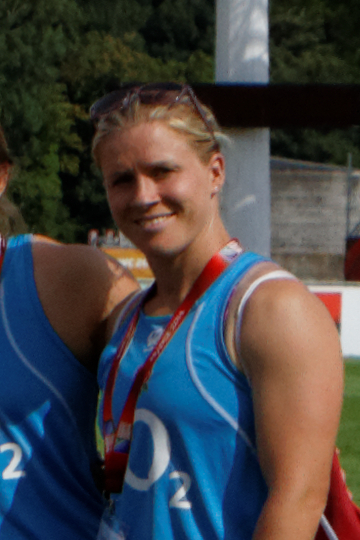
Danielle "Nolli" Waterman #109

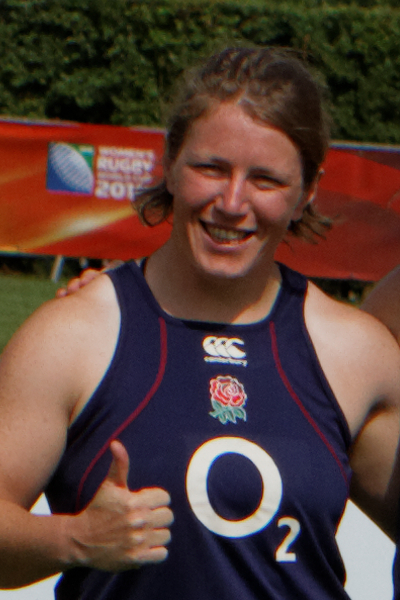
Rochelle "Rocky" Clark #110

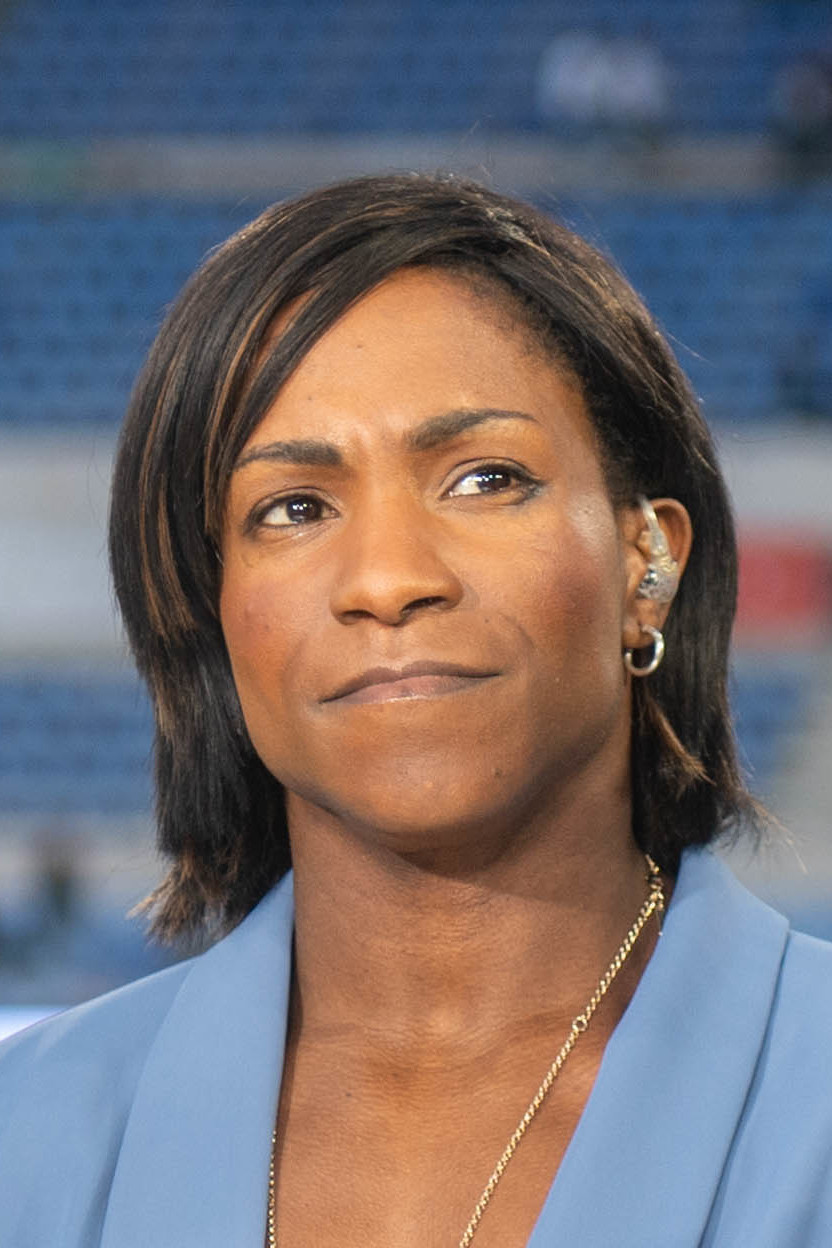
Maggie Alphonsi #111

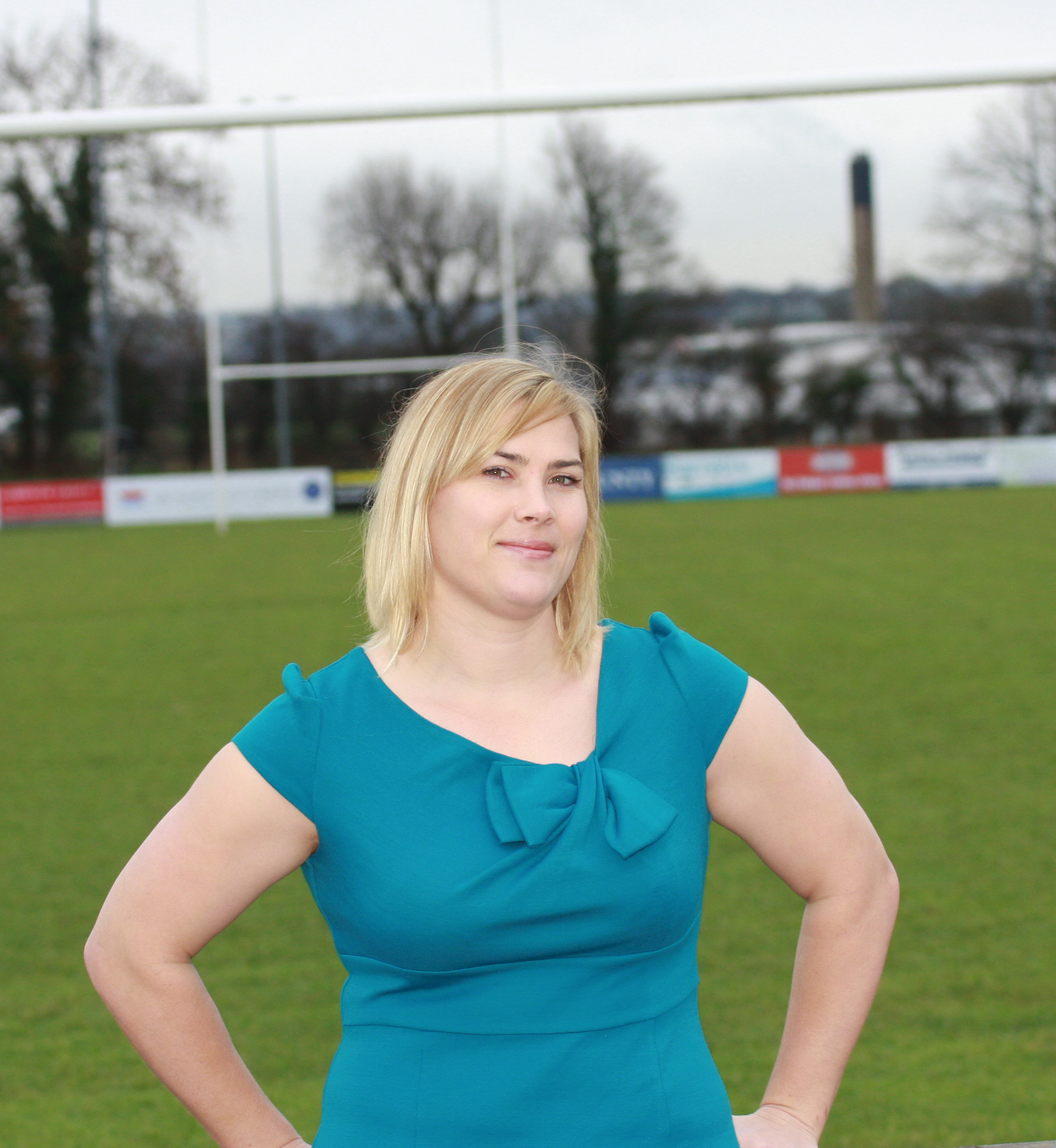
Catherine Spencer #114

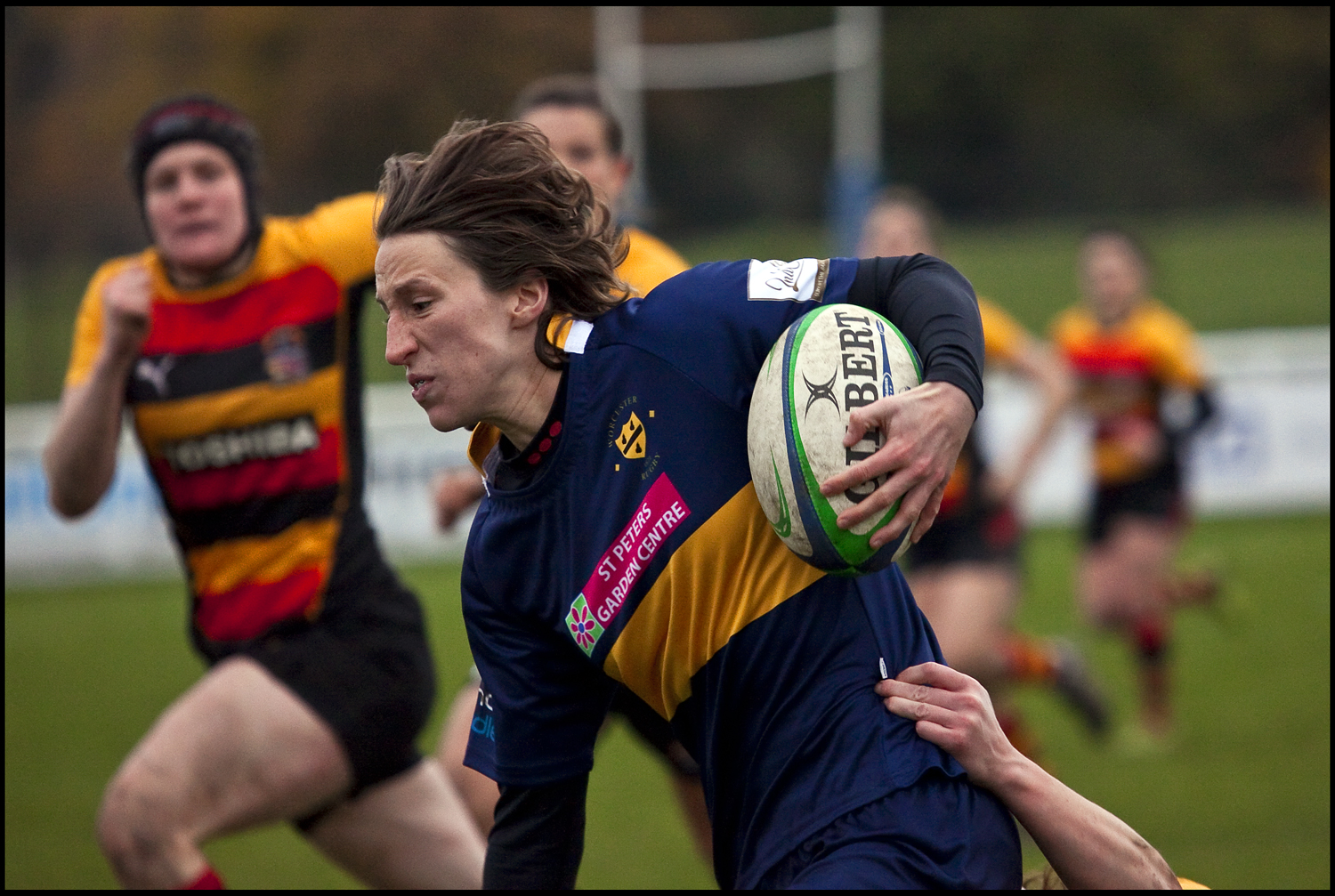
Katherine Merchant #123

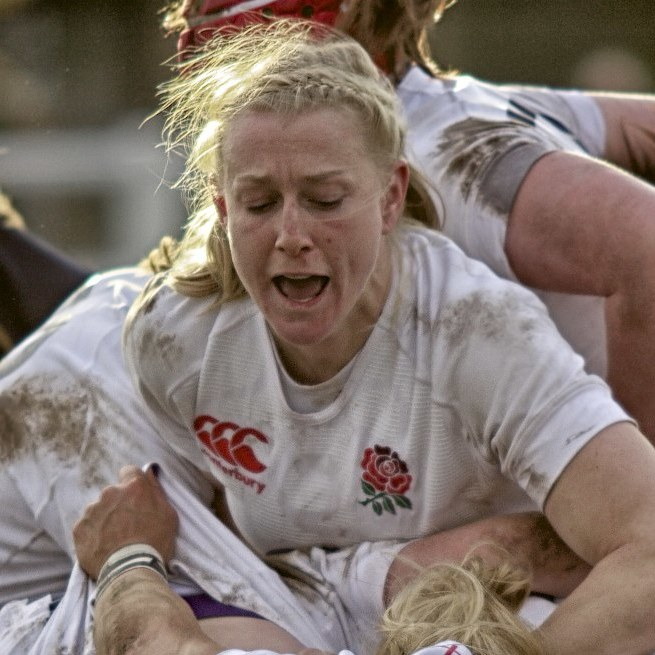
Tamara Taylor #128

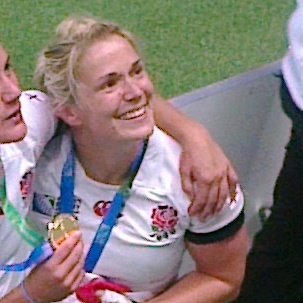
Rachael Burford #131

England's international rugby capped players
No.	Name	Position	Date of first cap	Opposition
88	Nicki Jupp	Centre	9 January 2000	vs. Spain at Barcelona
89	Selena Rudge	Hooker	9 January 2000	vs. Spain at Barcelona
90	Jenny Sutton	Lock	9 January 2000	vs. Spain at Barcelona
91	Amy Garnett	Hooker	9 January 2000	vs. Spain at Barcelona
92	Nicky Meston	Fly-half	9 January 2000	vs. Spain at Barcelona
93	Paula Ramsey	Prop	9 January 2000	vs. Spain at Barcelona
94	Jenny Foster	Lock	18 February 2000	vs. France at Massy
95	Fiona Britten	Wing	8 May 2000	vs. Kazakhstan at Vera
96	Sam Buckingham	Back row	13 May 2000	vs. Scotland at Almería
97	Sarah Marsh	Wing	23 September 2000	vs. United States at Winnipeg
98	Amanda Palmer-Norrie		23 September 2000	vs. United States at Winnipeg
99	Shelley Rae	Fly-half	23 September 2000	vs. United States at Winnipeg
100	Karen Andrew	Fly-half	27 September 2000	vs. Canada at Winnipeg
101	Audrey Rowley	Lock	27 September 2000	vs. Canada at Winnipeg
102	Nicky Goodwin	Hooker	8 April 2001	vs. France at Northampton
103	Eilidh Smith	Full-back	2 June 2001	vs. Australia at Newcastle
104	Sharon Whitehead	Prop	3 February 2002	vs. Scotland at Dunbar
105	Lizzie Knowles	Wing	7 April 2002	vs. Spain at Madrid
106	Helen Durman	Lock	15 February 2003	vs. France at Twickenham
107	Alex Pilkington	Flanker	15 February 2003	vs. France at Twickenham
108	Helen Flippance	Flanker	9 March 2003	vs. Spain at Twickenham
109	Danielle Waterman	Full-back	28 March 2003	vs. Ireland at Limerick
110	Rocky Clark	Prop	14 June 2003	vs. Canada at Vancouver
111	Maggie Alphonsi	Flanker	18 June 2003	vs. United States at Vancouver
112	Kimberley Shaylor	Wing	14 February 2004	vs. Spain at Zaragoza
113	Vanessa Gray	Prop	20 March 2004	vs. Wales at Twickenham
114	Catherine Spencer	Number 8	20 March 2004	vs. Wales at Twickenham
115	Karen Jones	Flanker	12 June 2004	vs. Canada at Calgary
116	Rachel Vickers	Lock	12 June 2004	vs. Canada at Calgary
117	Shannon Baker	Flanker	12 June 2004	vs. Canada at Calgary
118	Charlotte Barras	Centre	4 February 1996	vs. Wales at Leicester
119	Vicky Macqueen	Full-back	14 November 2004	vs. Canada at Richmond
120	Michaela Staniford	Wing/Centre	4 February 2005	vs. Wales at Cardiff
121	Lois Moulding	Flanker	4 February 2005	vs. Wales at Cardiff
122	Amy Turner	Scrum-half	4 February 2005	vs. Wales at Cardiff
123	Katherine Merchant	Wing	26 February 2005	vs. Ireland at Dublin
124	Claire Cripps	Prop	12 March 2005	vs. Spain at Imber Court
125	Kim Oliver	Fly-half	15 October 2005	vs. Samoa at Auckland
126	Alice Richardson	Fly-half	22 October 2005	vs. New Zealand at Auckland
127	Hannah Dawson	Prop	26 October 2005	vs. New Zealand at Hamilton
128	Tamara Taylor	Lock	26 October 2005	vs. New Zealand at Hamilton
129	Shauna Vetch	Centre	11 March 2006	vs. France at Bondoufle
130	Katy Storie	Prop	31 August 2006	vs. United States at St Albert
131	Rachael Burford	Centre	4 September 2006	vs. South Africa at Edmonton
132	Claire Allan	Centre/Full-back	3 February 2007	vs. Scotland at St Albans
133	Sophie Hemming	Prop	3 February 2007	vs. Scotland at St Albans
134	Joanna McGilchrist	Lock/Number 8	3 February 2007	vs. Scotland at St Albans
135	Sarah Beale	Lock/Number 8	3 February 2007	vs. Scotland at St Albans
136	Emma Croker	Hooker	3 February 2007	vs. Scotland at St Albans
137	Sarah Hunter	Number 8	3 February 2007	vs. Scotland at St Albans
138	Katy Daley-McLean	Fly-half	3 February 2007	vs. Scotland at St Albans
139	Amber Penrith	Wing	3 February 2007	vs. Scotland at St Albans
140	Jane Leonard	Flanker	15 December 2007	vs. United States at London Irish
141	Georgina Gulliver	Scrum-half	15 December 2007	vs. United States at London Irish
142	Gemma Sharples	Flanker	15 December 2007	vs. United States at London Irish
144	Sam Reeve	Hooker	9 February 2008	vs. Italy at Rome
145	Georgina Roberts	Centre/Full-back	8 March 2008	vs. Scotland at Meggetland
146	Natalie Binstead	Lock	8 March 2008	vs. Scotland at Meggetland
147	Roz Jermine (née Crowley)	Prop	17 May 2008	vs. Sweden at Amsterdam
148	Vicki Jackson	Centre	17 May 2008	vs. Sweden at Amsterdam
149	Fran Matthews	Centre	17 May 2008	vs. Sweden at Amsterdam
150	Marlie Packer	Flanker	17 May 2008	vs. Sweden at Amsterdam
151	Fiona Pocock	Wing/Full-back	17 May 2008	vs. Sweden at Amsterdam
152	Emily Scarratt	Centre	19 August 2008	vs. United States at Esher
153	Rowena Burnfield	Lock	20 December 2008	vs. Ireland
154	Becky Essex	Lock	20 December 2008	vs. Ireland
155	Tina Veale (née Lee)	Fly-half	20 December 2008	vs. Ireland
156	Olivia Poore	Hooker	27 February 2009	vs. Ireland at Dublin
157	Heather Fisher	Flanker	10 August 2009	vs. United States at Oakville
158	La Toya Mason	Scrum-half	14 November 2009	vs. New Zealand at Esher

== 2010–2019 ==
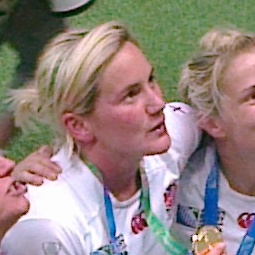
Claire Allan #132

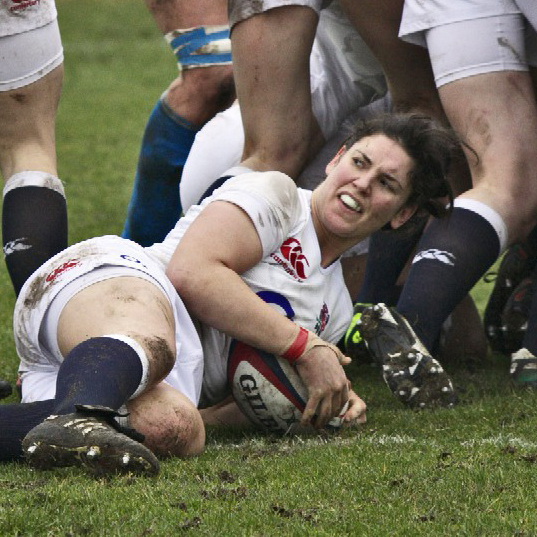
Sarah Hunter #137

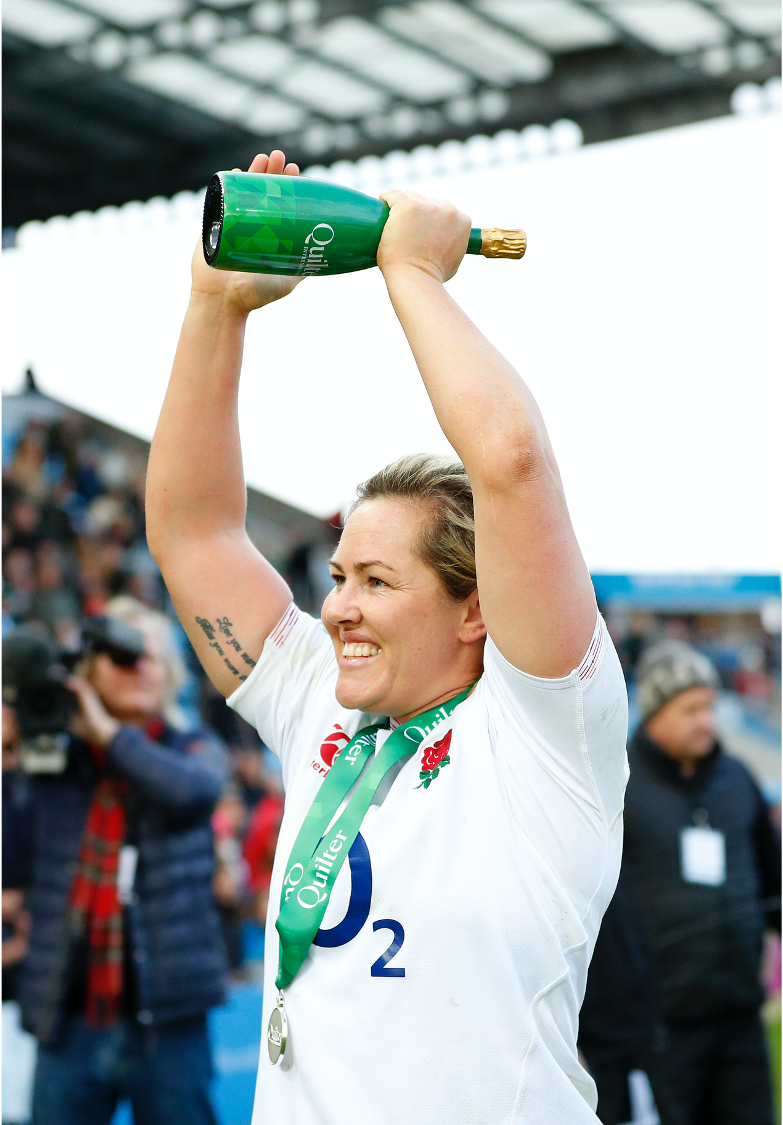
Marlie Packer #150

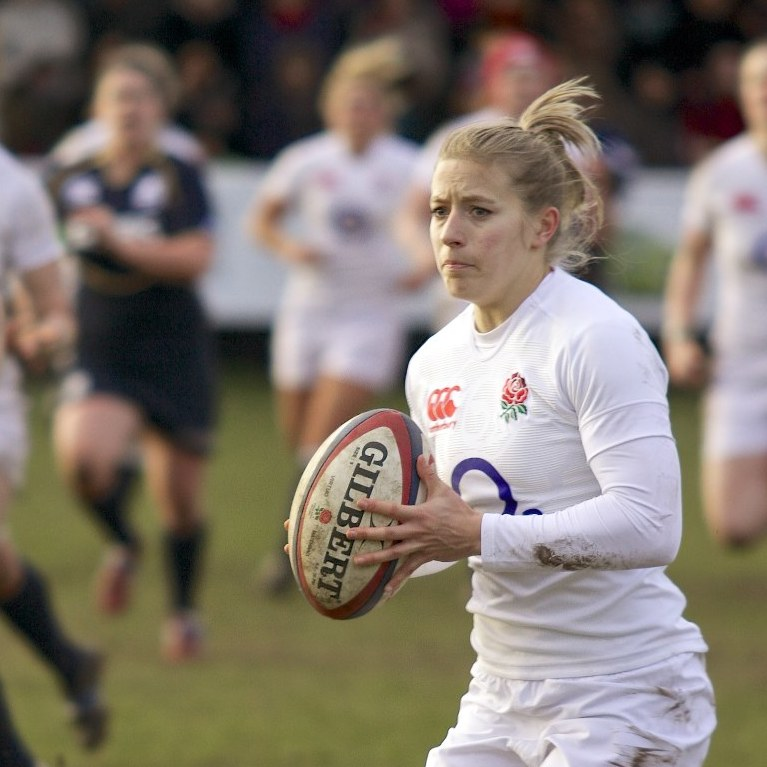
Fiona "Feepo" Pocock #151

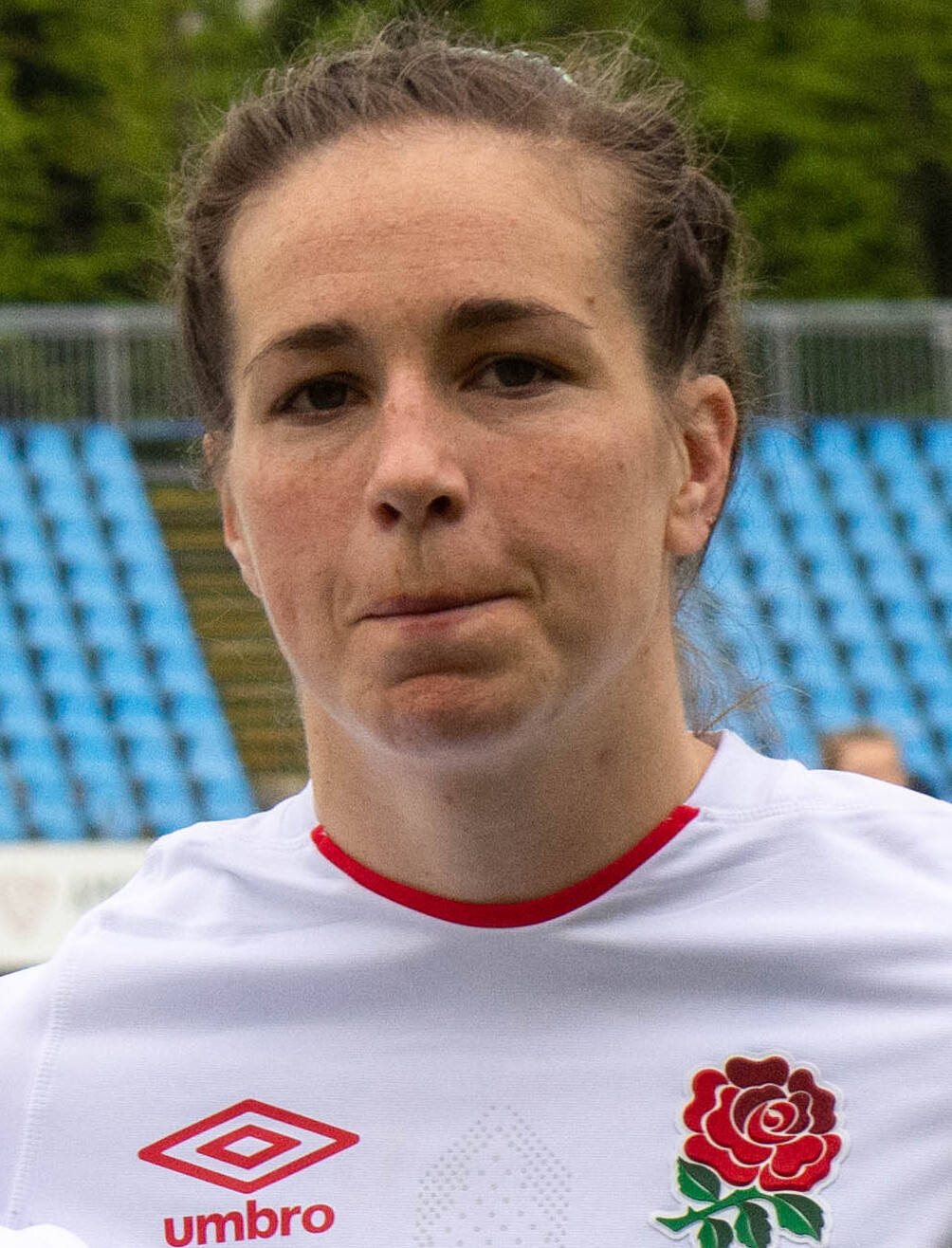
Emily Scarratt #152

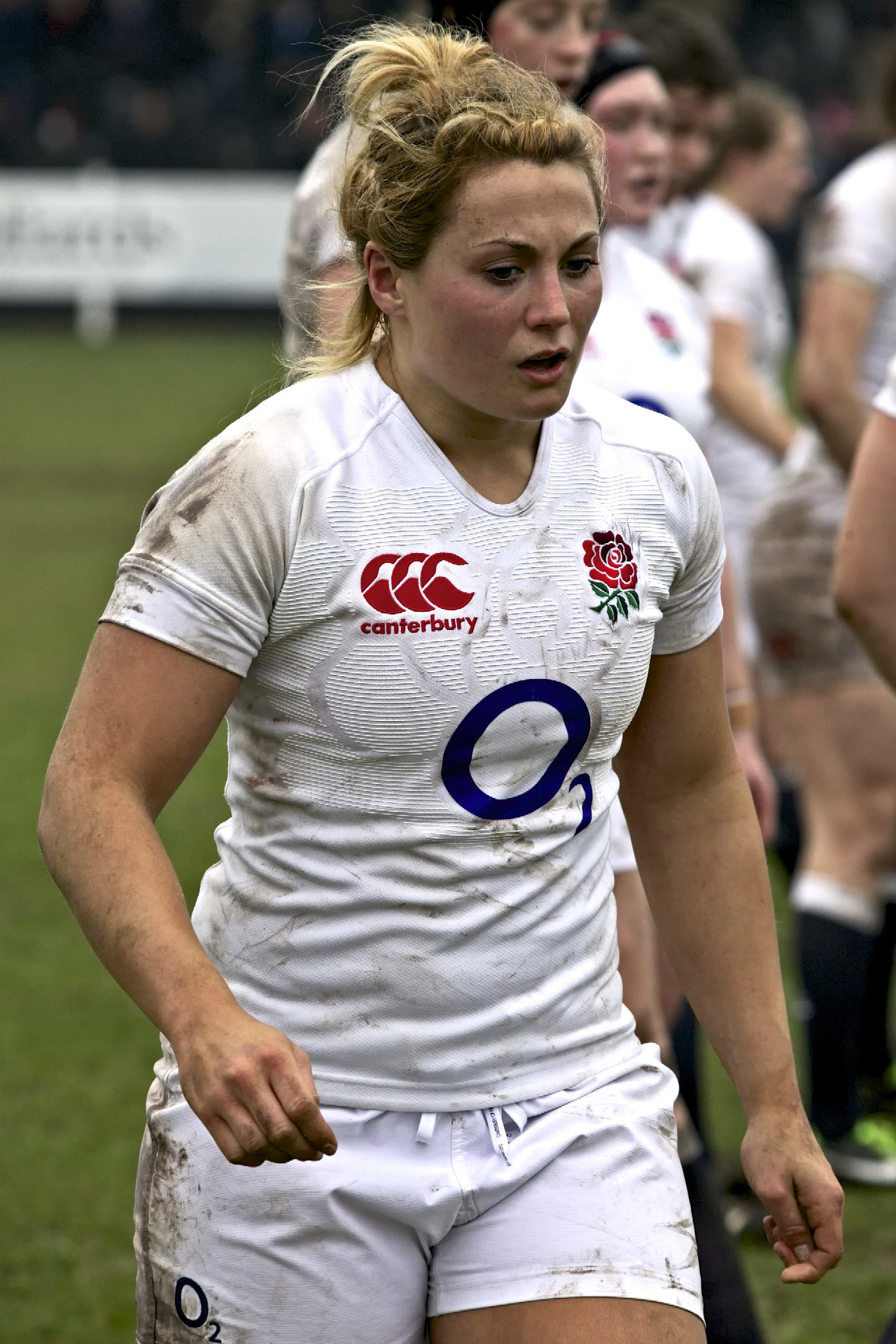
Victoria Fleetwood #160

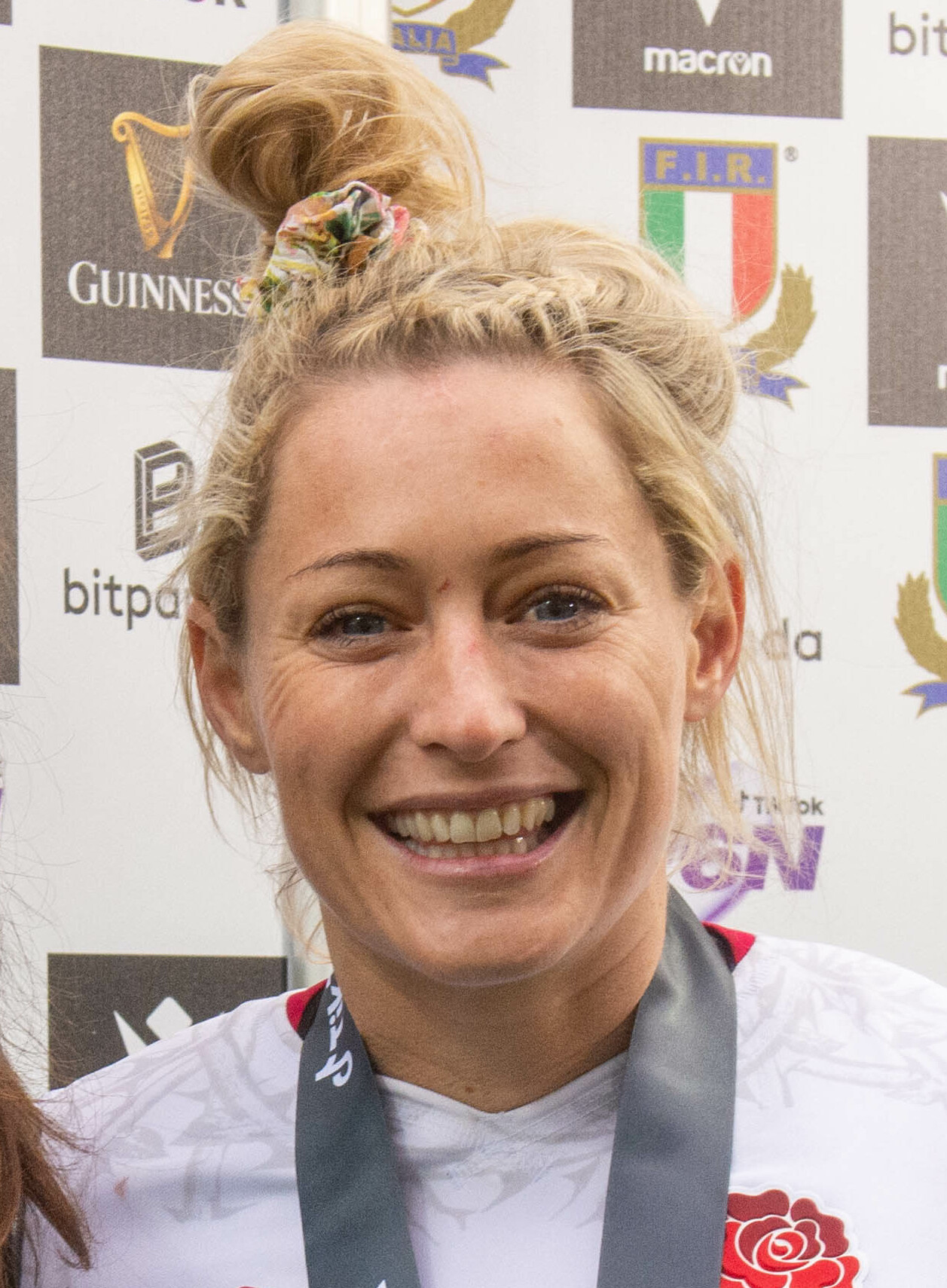
Natasha "Mo" Hunt #161

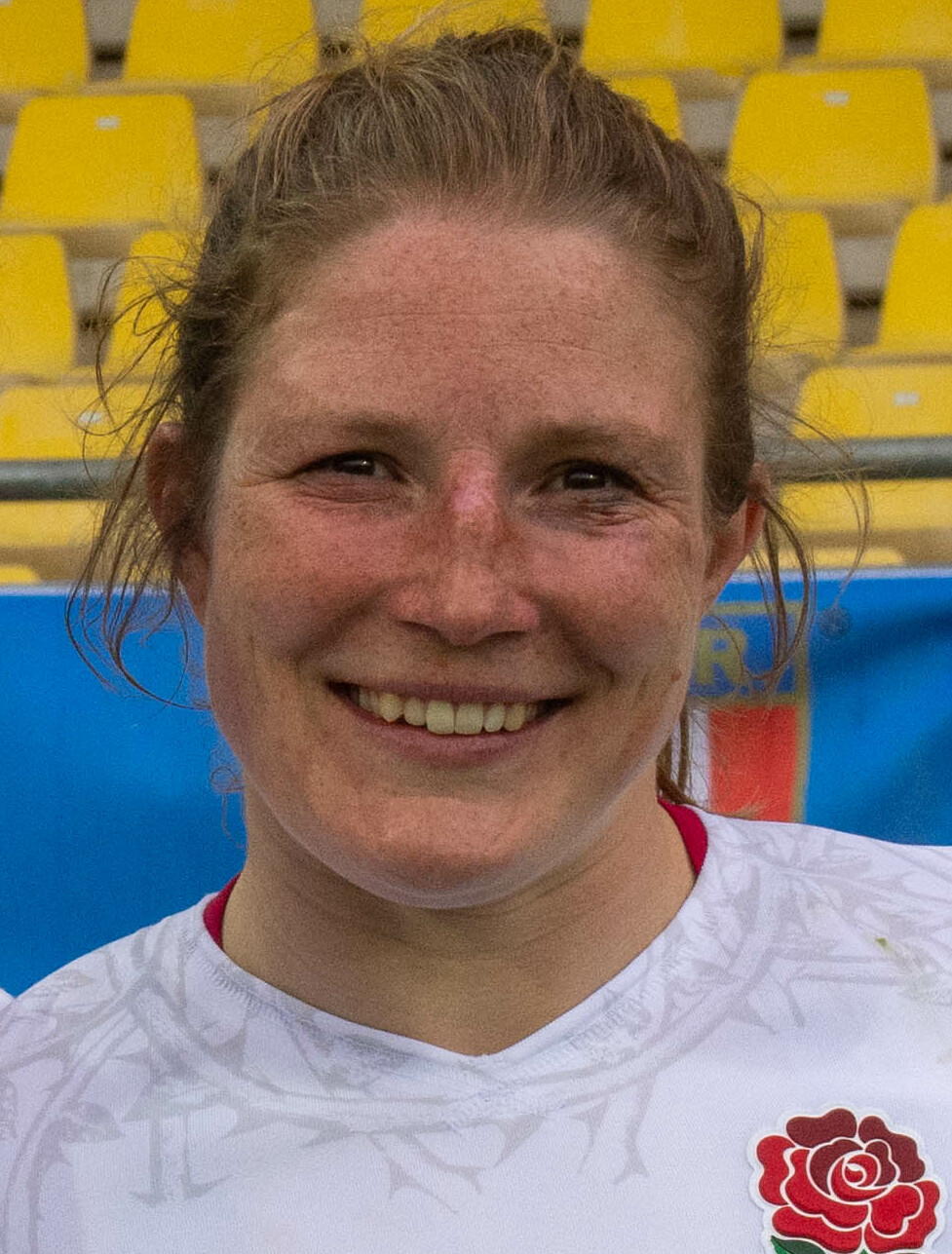
Lydia Thompson #173

England's international rugby capped players
No.	Name	Position	Date of first cap	Opposition
159	Jenny Brightmore	Centre	2 August 2011	vs. United States at Oakville
160	Vicky Fleetwood	Flanker/Hooker	2 August 2011	vs. United States at Oakville
161	Natasha Hunt	Scrum-half	2 August 2011	vs. United States at Oakville
162	Laura Keates	Prop	2 August 2011	vs. United States at Oakville
163	Kay Wilson	Wing	2 August 2011	vs. United States at Oakville
164	Sarah McKenna	Full-back	2 August 2011	vs. United States at Oakville
165	Alex Matthews	Flanker	5 November 2011	vs. France at Châteaurenard
166	Hannah Gallagher	Flanker	5 November 2011	vs. France at Châteaurenard
167	Izzy Noel-Smith	Flanker	5 November 2011	vs. France at Châteaurenard
168	Ceri Large	Fly-half	5 November 2011	vs. France at Châteaurenard
169	Harriet Millar-Mills	Lock	5 November 2011	vs. France at Châteaurenard
170	Emily Braund	Lock	5 February 2012	vs. Scotland at Lasswade
171	Ruth Laybourn	Wing	12 May 2012	vs. Spain at Rovereto
172	Kate Newton	Prop	12 May 2012	vs. Spain at Rovereto
173	Lydia Thompson	Wing	12 May 2012	vs. Spain at Rovereto
174	Sally Tuson	Wing	12 May 2012	vs. Spain at Rovereto
175	Lauren Cattell	Wing	12 May 2012	vs. Spain at Rovereto
176	Fiona Davidson	Scrum-half	12 May 2012	vs. Spain at Rovereto
177	Fiona Fletcher	Lock	15 May 2012	vs. Italy at Rovereto
178	Amber Reed	Fly-half/Centre	3 November 2012	vs. France at Esher
179	Joanne Watmore	Centre	3 November 2012	vs. France at Esher
180	Abi Chamberlain	Centre	2 February 2013	vs. Scotland at Esher
181	Emily Scott	Fly-half/Full-back	23 February 2013	vs. France at Twickenham
182	Megan Goddard	Centre	30 July 2013	vs. Canada at Greeley
183	Julie Hope	Wing	30 July 2013	vs. Canada at Greeley
184	Mercedes Foy	Hooker	30 July 2013	vs. Canada at Greeley
185	Justine Lucas	Prop	30 July 2013	vs. Canada at Greeley
186	Zoe Saynor	Lock	30 July 2013	vs. Canada at Greeley
187	Charlotte Keane	Scrum-half	30 July 2013	vs. Canada at Greeley
188	Kate Hancock	Full-back	4 August 2013	vs. South Africa at Greeley
189	Leanne Infante (née Riley)	Scrum-half	4 August 2013	vs. South Africa at Greeley
190	Amy Wilson-Hardy	Wing	4 August 2013	vs. South Africa at Greeley
191	Sacha Acheson	Prop	9 November 2013	vs. France at Twickenham
192	Natasha Brennan	Wing	7 March 2014	vs. Wales at Twickenham
193	Abbie Brown	Centre	8 February 2015	vs. Wales at Swansea
194	Hannah Field	Flanker	8 February 2015	vs. Wales at Swansea
195	Sydney Gregson	Wing	8 February 2015	vs. Wales at Swansea
196	Abbie Ward (née Scott)	Lock	8 February 2015	vs. Wales at Swansea
197	Bianca Blackburn	Scrum-half	8 February 2015	vs. Wales at Swansea
198	Vickii Cornborough	Prop	8 February 2015	vs. Wales at Swansea
199	Katie Mason	Full-back	8 February 2015	vs. Wales at Swansea
200	Amy Cokayne	Hooker	15 February 2015	vs. Italy at Twickenham
201	Heather Kerr	Hooker/Prop	13 March 2013	vs. Scotland at Cumbernauld
202	Lark Atkin-Davies	Hooker	27 June 2015	vs. United States at Calgary
203	Rachel Lund	Centre	27 June 2015	vs. United States at Calgary
204	Megan Jones	Centre	1 July 2015	vs. New Zealand at Red Deer
205	Lotte Sharp (née Clapp)	Wing	7 November 2015	vs. France at Martigues
206	Bee Dawson		5 February 2016	vs. Scotland at Cumbernauld
207	Courtney Gill	Lock	5 February 2016	vs. Scotland at Cumbernauld
208	Poppy Cleall	Back row/Lock	5 February 2016	vs. Scotland at Cumbernauld
209	Lucy Demaine	Centre	5 February 2016	vs. Scotland at Cumbernauld
210	Poppy Leitch	Flanker	13 December 2016	vs. Italy at Ivs.rea
211	Emily Wood	Centre	1 July 2016	vs. Canada at Salt Lake City
212	Sarah Bern	Prop	5 July 2016	vs. France at Salt Lake City
213	Zoe Stratford (née Aldcroft)	Lock/Back row	5 July 2016	vs. France at Salt Lake City
214	Jess Breach	Wing	17 November 2017	vs. Canada at Barnet Copthall
215	Abby Dow	Wing	17 November 2017	vs. Canada at Barnet Copthall
216	Shaunagh Brown	Prop	17 November 2017	vs. Canada at Barnet Copthall
217	Ellie Kildunne	Centre/Full-back	17 November 2017	vs. Canada at Barnet Copthall
218	Zoe Harrison	Fly-half/Centre	17 November 2017	vs. Canada at Barnet Copthall
219	Hannah Botterman	Prop	17 November 2017	vs. Canada at Barnet Copthall
220	Caity Mattinson	Scrum-half	17 November 2017	vs. Canada at Barnet Copthall
221	Jo Brown	Flanker	21 November 2017	vs. Canada at Twickenham
222	Cath O'Donnell	Lock	21 November 2017	vs. Canada at Twickenham
223	Lagi Tuima	Centre	21 November 2017	vs. Canada at Twickenham
224	Charlotte Pearce	Centre	4 February 2018	vs. Italy at Reggio Emilia
225	Kelly Taylor (née Smith)	Wing	23 February 2018	vs. Scotland at Glasgow
226	El Perry	Prop	9 November 2018	vs. United States at Barnet Copthall
227	Sarah Beckett	Back row	9 November 2018	vs. United States at Barnet Copthall
228	Tatyana Heard	Centre	9 November 2018	vs. United States at Barnet Copthall
229	Carys Williams-Morris	Wing	9 November 2018	vs. United States at Barnet Copthall
230	Lucy Attwood	Centre	9 November 2018	vs. United States at Barnet Copthall
231	Claudia Moloney-MacDonald	Scrum-half/Wing	9 November 2018	vs. United States at Barnet Copthall
232	Bryony Cleall	Prop	1 February 2019	vs. Ireland at Dublin
233	Rosie Galligan	Lock	1 February 2019	vs. Ireland at Dublin
234	Clara Nielson	Hooker	28 June 2019	vs. United States at San Diego
235	Chloe Edwards	Prop	28 June 2019	vs. United States at San Diego
236	Rownita Marston-Mulhearn	Number 8	16 November 2019	vs. France at Exeter

== 2020–present ==
England's international rugby capped players
No.	Name	Position	Date of first cap	Opposition
237	Amelia Harper	Flanker	2 February 2020	vs. France at Pau
238	Detysha Harper	Prop	23 February 2020	vs. Ireland at Doncaster
239	Mia Venner	Full-back/Wing	7 March 2020	vs. Wales at Twickenham
240	Morwenna Talling	Lock/Back row	1 November 2020	vs. Italy at Parma
241	Helena Rowland	Fly-half/Centre	1 November 2020	vs. Italy at Parma
242	Holly Aitchison	Fly-half/Centre	31 October 2021	vs. New Zealand at Exeter
243	Maud Muir	Prop	31 October 2021	vs. New Zealand at Exeter
244	Heather Cowell	Wing	14 November 2021	vs. Canada at Twickenham
245	Sadia Kabeya	Flanker	14 November 2021	vs. Canada at Twickenham
246	Connie Powell	Hooker	21 November 2021	vs. United States at Worcester
247	Lucy Packer	Scrum-half	21 November 2021	vs. United States at Worcester
248	Emma Sing	Full-back	26 March 2022	vs. Scotland at ERS
249	Mackenzie Carson	Prop	25 March 2023	vs. Scotland at Newcastle
250	Kelsey Clifford	Prop	25 March 2023	vs. Scotland at Newcastle
251	Liz Crake	Prop	25 March 2023	vs. Scotland at Newcastle
252	Ella Wyrwas	Scrum-half	25 March 2023	vs. Scotland at Newcastle
253	Delaney Burns	Lock	4 April 2023	vs. Italy at Northampton
254	Emily Robinson	Flanker	4 April 2023	vs. Italy at Northampton
255	May Campbell	Hooker	15 April 2023	vs. Wales at Cardiff
256	Maisy Allen	Flanker	23 September 2023	vs. Canada at Exeter
257	Sophie Bridger	Centre	30 September 2023	vs. Canada at Barnet Copthall
258	Daisy Hibbert-Jones	Lock	20 October 2023	vs. Australia at Wellington
259	Maddie Feaunati	Back row	24 March 2024	vs. Italy at Parma
260	Lizzie Hanlon	Prop	21 April 2024	vs. Ireland at Twickenham
261	Lilli Ives Campion	Lock	7 September 2024	vs. France at Gloucester
262	Georgia Brock	Flanker	14 September 2024	vs. New Zealand at Twickenham
263	Phoebe Murray	Centre	29 September 2024	vs. United States at Vancouver
264	Bo Westcombe-Evans	Wing	29 September 2024	vs. United States at Vancouver
265	Flo Robinson	Scrum-half	23 March 2025	vs. Italy at York
266	Jade Shekells	Centre/Wing	23 March 2025	vs. Italy at York
267	Abi Burton	Back row	29 March 2025	vs. Wales at Cardiff
268	Haineala Lutui	Lock/Back row	11 April 2026	vs. Ireland at Twickenham
269	Demelza Short	Lock/Back row	18 April 2026	vs. Scotland at Edinburgh
270	Millie David	Wing	25 April 2026	vs. Wales at Bristol
271	Haidee Head	Back row	9 May 2026	vs. Italy at Parma
272	Christiana Balogun	Lock/Back row	9 May 2026	vs. Italy at Parma
273	Bryony Field	Hooker	12 September 2026	vs. Australia at Salford
