= 2006 Women's Rugby World Cup final =

2006 Women's Rugby World Cup Final
- Event: 2006 Women's Rugby World Cup
New Zealand	England
(New Zealand)	(England)
25	17
- Date: 17 September 2006
- Venue: Commonwealth Stadium, Edmonton
- Referee: Simon McDowell (Ireland)
- Attendance: 5500
- Weather: Fine

The 2006 Women's Rugby World Cup Final was a rugby union match that determined the 2006 Women's Rugby World Cup winner. The match took place on 17 September 2006 at the Commonwealth Stadium in Edmonton, Canada. It was contested between New Zealand and England for the second time in a row. It was England's fourth appearance in a Final and New Zealand's third. New Zealand won their third consecutive title after beating England 25–17.

== Route to the final ==
New Zealand
Round
England
Opponent
Result
Pool stage
Opponent
Result
Canada
66–7
Match 1
United States
18–0
Samoa
50–0
Match 2
South Africa
74–8
Scotland
21–0
Match 3
France
27–8
Pool A ⇔ Pool D

Pool	Team	Won	Drawn	Lost	For	Against	Points
A	New Zealand	3	0	0	137	7	14
D	Canada	2	0	1	131	71	10
D	Scotland	2	0	1	56	38	10
D	Samoa	1	0	2	32	69	5
A	Spain	1	0	2	14	115	4
A	Kazakhstan	0	0	3	22	97	0

(Note: See: 2006 Women's Rugby World Cup Format for information about Pool stage)

Final standing
Pool B ⇔ Pool C

Pool	Team	Won	Drawn	Lost	For	Against	Points
B	England	3	0	0	119	16	14
C	France	2	0	1	75	37	10
C	United States	2	0	1	34	35	9
B	Australia	1	0	2	88	42	6
B	Ireland	1	0	2	48	67	5
C	South Africa	0	0	3	20	179	0

Opponent
Result
Knockout stage
Opponent
Result
France
40–10
Semi-finals
Canada
10–6

The pool stage of the 2006 World Cup was played in a cross-pool league system. Teams in Pool A competed against teams in Pool D, and Pool B teams competed against those in Pool C. New Zealand was in Pool A and played against Canada, Scotland and Samoa who were in Pool D. England was in Pool B and played France, the United States and South Africa from Pool C.

New Zealand played hosts, Canada, as they scored ten tries to begin their title defence. Canada only managed a converted try and couldn't stop the Black Ferns trouncing them 66–7. Samoa with their New Zealand based players were unsuccessful in scoring any points. Amiria Rule scored a hat-trick in the match as New Zealand scored 50 unanswered points. Scotland proved to be more resilient than Canada and Samoa as the Black Ferns were only able to score three tries. France were New Zealand's semifinal opponents and were defeated 40–10.

England beat inaugural champions, the United States, in the opening round of the World Cup 18–0 and then overwhelmed the South Africans 74–8. England's last pool game was against France, they won 27–8. England came too close for comfort in their semifinal against Canada, they barely scrapped by with a 10–6 win.

== Match ==
17 September 2006

New Zealand	25–17	England
Try: Codling; Mortimer; Heighway; Marsh; Con: Jensen; Pen: Jensen	Report	Try: Penalty Try; Clayton; Con: Andrew; Rae; Pen: Andrew

Commonwealth Stadium
Attendance: 5500
Referee: (Republic of Ireland) S. McDowell

FB	15	Amiria Marsh
RW	14	Claire Richardson
OC	13	Huriana Manuel
IC	12	Exia Edwards
LW	11	Stephanie Mortimer
FH	10	Anna Richards
SH	9	Emma Jensen
N8	8	Linda Itunu
OF	7	Rochelle Martin
BF	6	Melissa Ruscoe
RL	5	Victoria Heighway
LL	4	Monalisa Codling
TP	3	Casey Robertson
HK	2	Farah Palmer
LP	1	Diane Maliukaetau
Replacements:
HK	16	Fiao’o Fa’amausili
PR	17	Helen Va'aga
LK	18	Kimberley Smith
FL	19	Shannon Willoughby
SH	20	Waimania Teddy
FH	21	Rebecca Hull
CE	22	Hannah Myers
Coach:
(New Zealand) Jed Rowlands

FB	15	Charlotte Barras
RW	14	Danielle Waterman
OC	13	Susan Day
IC	12	Kimberley Oliver
LW	11	Kimberley Shaylor
FH	10	Karen Andrew
SH	9	Joanne Yapp
N8	8	Catherine Spencer
OF	7	Margaret Alphonsi
BF	6	Georgia Stevens
RL	5	Jennifer Lyne
LL	4	Jennifer Sutton
TP	3	Vanessa Gray
HK	2	Amy Garnett
LP	1	Rochelle Clark
Replacements:
HK	16	Selena Rudge
PR	17	Vanessa Huxford
PR	18	Tamara Taylor
LK	19	Helen Clayton
SH	20	Amy Turner
FH	21	Shelley Rae
CE	22	Nicola Crawford
Coach:
(England) Geoff Richards

=== Summary ===
England dominated the first half of a tough match. English fly-half Karen Andrew scored the first points of the game after she successfully kicked a penalty in the third minute. New Zealand later equalized just before the 30th minute after a missed penalty earlier in the ninth. Two minutes before halftime Black Ferns Lock Monalisa Codling scored a try that put them in the lead 10–3 with a successful conversion from Scrum-half Emma Jensen. Stephanie Mortimer increased the Black Ferns lead to 15–3 with a try at the start of the second half. In the 49th minute England was awarded a penalty try and Karen Andrew's conversion brought them within five points of New Zealand, the score now 15–10. Victoria Heighway scored another try for the Black Ferns to make it 20–10. Helen Clayton scored England's last try and Shelley Rae converted it to bring the points to 20–17. Amiria Marsh's try sealed the deal for New Zealand as they celebrated their 25–17 victory and third World Cup title.
