= 2006 Women's Rugby World Cup squads =

2006 Rugby World Cup Squads
Tournament details
- Host nation: 2006 Rugby World Cup Squads
- Dates: 31 August – 17 September
- No. of nations: 12

This article lists the official squads for the 2006 Women's Rugby World Cup.

== Pool A ==
=== New Zealand ===
- Coach: Jed Rowlands
- Assistant coach: Dale Atkins

Note: Flags indicate national union for the club/province as defined by World Rugby.

| Player | Position | Date of birth (age) | Caps | Club/province |
|---|---|---|---|---|
| Victoria Blackledge | Wing | 26 August 1982 | | (New Zealand) Auckland |
| Monalisa Codling | Second row | 20 April 1977 | | (New Zealand) Auckland |
| Exia Edwards | Centre | 12 November 1975 | | (New Zealand) Bay of Plenty |
| Fiao’o Fa’amausili | Hooker | 30 September 1980 | | (New Zealand) Auckland |
| Victoria Heighway | Second row | 28 November 1980 | | (New Zealand) Auckland |
| Rebecca Hull | Fly-half | 25 August 1983 | | (New Zealand) Hawke’s Bay |
| Linda Itunu | Number 8 | 21 November 1984 | | (New Zealand) Auckland |
| Emma Jensen | Scrum-half | 25 November 1977 | | (New Zealand) Auckland |
| Rachel Makata | Second row | 10 July 1974 | | (New Zealand) Auckland |
| Beth Mallard | Prop | 5 August 1981 | | (New Zealand) Otago |
| Diane Maliukaetau | Prop | 12 September 1986 | | (New Zealand) Auckland |
| Rochelle Martin | Number 8 | 28 March 1973 | | (New Zealand) Auckland |
| Huriana Manuel | Centre | 8 August 1986 | | (New Zealand) Auckland |
| Amiria Marsh | Wing | 17 May 1983 | | (New Zealand) Canterbury |
| Stephanie Mortimer | Wing | 2 October 1981 | | (New Zealand) Canterbury |
| Hannah Myers | Centre | 28 September 1979 | | (New Zealand) Auckland |
| Mel Ngatai | Prop | 26 June 1976 | | (New Zealand) Hawke’s Bay |
| Farah Palmer (c) | Hooker | 27 November 1972 | | (New Zealand) Manawatu (c) |
| Anna Richards | Fly-half | 3 December 1964 | | (New Zealand) Auckland |
| Claire Richardson | Wing | 2 April 1984 | | (New Zealand) Otago |
| Casey Robertson | Prop | 24 February 1981 | | (New Zealand) Canterbury |
| Melissa Ruscoe | Second row | 15 December 1976 | | (New Zealand) Canterbury |
| Kimberley Smith | Second row | 21 August 1985 | | (New Zealand) Canterbury |
| Waimania Teddy | Scrum-half | 13 February 1979 | | (New Zealand) Auckland |
| Amy Williams | Wing | 15 December 1986 | | (New Zealand) Hawke’s Bay |
| Shannon Willoughby | Second row | 15 January 1982 | | (New Zealand) Otago |

=== Spain ===
Note: Flags indicate national union for the club/province as defined by World Rugby.

| Player | Position | Date of birth (age) | Caps | Club/province |
|---|---|---|---|---|
| Aroa González (vc) | Hooker | 27 | 26 | RC L'Hospitale |
| Olatz Fernández de Arroyabe | Hooker | 36 | 36 | Getxo RT |
| Marta Carreras | Prop | 31 | 8 | INEF Barcelona |
| Rocío García | Prop | 25 | 23 | ARV Ourense |
| Nerea Otxoa de Aspuru | Prop | 29 | 24 | Gaztedi RT |
| María Sequedo | Prop | 26 | 4 | UE Santboiana |
| Lía Bailan | Second row | 38 | 5 | Olímpico RC |
| María Teresa Delgado | Second row | 29 | 16 | INEF Barcelona |
| María Isabel Pérez | Second row | 30 | 21 | Universidad de Granada |
| Aitziber Porras | Second row | 28 | 17 | Gaztedi RT |
| Rosanna Estanyol | Flanker | 35 | 22 | Getxo RT |
| Angelina Masdeu | Flanker | 29 | 34 | Gaztedi RT |
| Bárbara Plà | Flanker | 23 | 8 | INEF Barcelona |
| Ana María Aigneren | Number 8 | 28 | 6 | Olímpico RC |
| Concepción Ramos | Scrum-half | 30 | 13 | INEF Barcelona |
| Isabel Rodríguez (c) | Scrum-half | 31 | 28 | Getxo RT |
| Inés Etxegibel | Fly-half | 32 | 57 | INEF Barcelona |
| Francisca Moreno | Fly-half | 28 | 3 | Universidad de Granada |
| Nerea Lasa | Centre | 29 | 14 | Durango RT |
| Helena Roca | Centre | 30 | 33 | CRAT |
| Raquel Socías | Centre | 30 | 24 | Olímpico RC |
| Gina De Swert | Wing | 23 | 1 | INEF Barcelona |
| Berta García | Wing | 24 | 4 | CRAT |
| María Victoria Hernández | Wing | 22 | 0 | Olímpico RC |
| Agurtzane Obregozo | Wing | 26 | 7 | La Única RT |
| Montserrat Poza | Fullback | 29 | 27 | UE Santboiana |

=== Kazakhstan ===
Note: Flags indicate national union for the club/province as defined by World Rugby.

| Player | Position | Date of birth (age) | Caps | Club/province |
|---|---|---|---|---|
| Radzevil | Prop | | | (Kazakhstan) |
| Sarsenbayeva | Hooker | | | (Kazakhstan) |
| Chuprikova | Prop | | | (Kazakhstan) |
| Rudoy | Second row | | | (Kazakhstan) |
| Karatygina | Second row | | | (Kazakhstan) |
| Mustafina | Flanker | | | (Kazakhstan) |
| Tugambeokva | Flanker | | | (Kazakhstan) |
| Yakovleva | Number 8 | | | (Kazakhstan) |
| Khamova | Scrum-half | | | (Kazakhstan) |
| Tur | Fly-half | | | (Kazakhstan) |
| Amossova | Wing | | | (Kazakhstan) |
| Amrayeva | Centre | | | (Kazakhstan) |
| Nezbudey | Centre | | | (Kazakhstan) |
| Essembekova | Wing | | | (Kazakhstan) |
| Svetlana Klyuchnikova (c) | Fullback | | | (Kazakhstan) (c) |
| Mussabayeva | ?? | | | (Kazakhstan) |
| Nikulich | ?? | | | (Kazakhstan) |
| Kalen | ?? | | | (Kazakhstan) |
| Amandossova | ?? | | | (Kazakhstan) |
| Balashova | ?? | | | (Kazakhstan) |
| Duzelbayeva | ?? | | | (Kazakhstan) |
| Vagapova | ?? | | | (Kazakhstan) |

== Pool B ==
=== England ===
Note: Flags indicate national union for the club/province as defined by World Rugby.

| Player | Position | Date of birth (age) | Caps | Club/province |
|---|---|---|---|---|
| Margaret Alphonsi | Flanker | 20 December 1983 | | (England) Saracens |
| Karen Andrew | Fly-half | 14 April 1976 | | (England) Saracens |
| Charlotte Barras | Fullback | 26 January 1982 | | (England) Lichfield |
| Shannon Baker | Flanker | 30 January 1980 | | (England) Richmond |
| Rachael Burford | Centre | 19 August 1986 | | (England) Henle |
| Rochelle Clark | Prop | 29 May 1981 | | (England) Henley |
| Helen Clayton | Flanker | 17 June 1971 | | (England) Saracens |
| Nicola Crawford | Wing | 20 November 1971 | | (England) Worcester |
| Susan Day | Centre | 29 October 1972 | | (England) Wasps |
| Amy Garnett | Hooker | 31 March 1976 | | (England) Saracens |
| Vanessa Gray | Prop | 13 October 1970 | | (England) Wasps |
| Vanessa Huxford | Prop | 13 October 1970 | | (England) Wasps |
| Jennifer Lyne | Flanker | 29 May 1972 | | (England) Richmond |
| Kimberley Oliver | Centre | 1 September 1983 | | (England) Clifton |
| Shelley Rae | Fly-half | 1 June 1976 | | (England) Wasps |
| Selena Rudge | Hooker | 5 November 1975 | | (England) Wasps |
| Kimberley Shaylor | Wing | 15 June 1981 | | (England) Worcester |
| Catherine Spencer | Number 8 | 25 May 1979 | | (England) Folkestone |
| Michaela Staniford | Wing | 11 January 1987 | | (England) Henley |
| Georgia Stevens | Flanker | 13 June 1973 | | (England) Clifton |
| Katy Storie | Prop | 7 August 1979 | | (England) Clifton |
| Jennifer Sutton | Second row | 26 February 1969 | | (England) Richmond |
| Tamara Taylor | Second row | 8 October 1981 | | (England) Thirsk |
| Amy Turner | Prop | 31 July 1984 | | (England) Wasps |
| Danielle Waterman | Fullback | 20 January 1985 | | (England) Henley |
| Joanne Yapp (c) | Scrum-half | 26 September 1979 | | (England) Worcester (c) |

=== Australia ===
- Coach: Steve Hamson

Note: Flags indicate national union for the club/province as defined by World Rugby.

| Player | Position | Date of birth (age) | Caps | Club/province |
|---|---|---|---|---|
| Louise Burrows | Hooker | 11 March 1978 (aged 28) | | (Australia) |
| Annette Finch | Hooker | 23 April 1980 (aged 26) | | (Australia) |
| Louise Morrison | Hooker | 26 June 1980 (aged 26) | | (Australia) |
| Silei Poluleuligaga | Hooker | 8 March 1981 (aged 25) | | (Australia) |
| Vanessa Bradley | Prop | 18 October 1976 (aged 29) | | (Australia) |
| Lito Fata | Prop | 21 September 1974 (aged 31) | | (Australia) |
| Lindsay Morgan | Prop | 18 October 1979 (aged 26) | | (Australia) |
| Paige Butcher | Lock | 18 June 1974 (aged 32) | | (Australia) |
| Jacqueline Cutts | Lock | | | (Australia) |
| Alicia Frost | Lock | 20 September 1980 (aged 25) | | (Australia) |
| Alexandra Hargreaves | Lock | 13 November 1980 (aged 25) | | (Australia) |
| Kate Porter | Lock | 19 April 1983 (aged 23) | | (Australia) |
| Chris Ross | Lock | 10 February 1979 (aged 27) | | (Australia) |
| Tasileta Bethell | Back row | 3 July 1983 (aged 23) | | (Australia) |
| Se'ei Sa'u | Back row | 3 November 1974 (aged 31) | | (Australia) |
| Selena Worsely | Back row | 18 April 1975 (aged 31) | | (Australia) |
| Rebecca Trethowan | Back row | 8 February 1985 (aged 21) | | (Australia) |
| Kim Wilson | Back row | 27 September 1983 (aged 22) | | (Australia) |
| Iliseva Batibasaga | Scrum-half | 23 March 1985 (aged 21) | | (Australia) |
| Cheryl Soon | Scrum-half | 23 September 1975 (aged 30) | | (Australia) |
| Rachelle Pirie | Fly-half | 12 January 1977 (aged 29) | | (Australia) |
| Alana Thomas | Fly-half | 18 March 1982 (aged 24) | | (Australia) |
| Rebecca Anderson | Centre | 27 December 1981 (aged 24) | | (Australia) |
| Lisa Fiaola | Centre | 25 November 1970 (aged 35) | | (Australia) |
| Ruan Sims | Centre | 4 February 1982 (aged 24) | | (Australia) |
| Tricia Brown | Wing | 14 March 1979 (aged 27) | | (Australia) |
| Kristy Frogley | Wing | 12 February 1979 (aged 27) | | (Australia) |
| Bronwyn Laidlaw | Fullback | 27 December 1974 (aged 31) | | (Australia) |
| Tobie McGann | Fullback | 4 August 1982 (aged 24) | | (Australia) |

=== Ireland ===
Note: Flags indicate national union for the club/province as defined by World Rugby.

| Player | Position | Date of birth (age) | Caps | Club/province |
|---|---|---|---|---|
| Marie Barrett | ?? | | | (Republic of Ireland) Highfield |
| Rache Boydl | ?? | | | (Northern Ireland) Cooke |
| Orla Brennan | ?? | | | (Republic of Ireland) Blackrock |
| Fiona Coghlan | Prop | 3 March 1981 | | (Republic of Ireland) UL Bohemian |
| Rosie Foley | Lock | 27 October 1982 | | (Republic of Ireland) Shannon |
| Laura Guest | Prop | 24 April 1985 | | (Republic of Ireland) Clonakilty |
| Germaine Healy | ?? | | | (Republic of Ireland) Blackrock |
| Jean Lonergan | ?? | | | (Republic of Ireland) Shannon |
| Caroline Mahon | ?? | | | (Republic of Ireland) UL Bohemian |
| Gillian McAllister | ?? | | | (Republic of Ireland) Cooke |
| Joy Neville | Number 8 | 24 July 1983 | | (Republic of Ireland) Shannon |
| Yvonne Nolan | ?? | | | (Republic of Ireland) Blackrock |
| Eimear O'Sullivan | ?? | | | (Republic of Ireland) Clonakilty |
| Sinead Ryan | ?? | | | (Republic of Ireland) Navan |
| Louise Beamish | ?? | | | (Republic of Ireland) UL Bohemian |
| Sarah Jane Belton | ?? | | | (Republic of Ireland) UL Bohemian |
| Lynne Cantwell | Centre | 27 September 1981 | | (England) Trojans |
| Grace Davitt | Centre | 25 December 1982 | | (Republic of Ireland) Blackrock |
| Jeannette Feighery | ?? | | | (Republic of Ireland) UL Bohemian |
| Suzanne Fleming | ?? | | | (Northern Ireland) Cooke |
| Amanda Greensmith | ?? | | | (Republic of Ireland) Shannon |
| Shannon Houston | ?? | | | (Republic of Ireland) Blackrock |
| Patrique Kelly | ?? | | | (Republic of Ireland) UL Bohemian |
| Nuala Ni Chadhain | ?? | | | (Republic of Ireland) Galwegians |
| Joanne O'Sullivan | ?? | | | (England) Lichfield |
| Tania Rosser | Scrum-half | 15 April 1978 | | (Republic of Ireland) Blackrock |

== Pool C ==
=== France ===
Note: Flags indicate national union for the club/province as defined by World Rugby.

| Player | Position | Date of birth (age) | Caps | Club/province |
|---|---|---|---|---|
| Danièle Irazu | ?? | | | (France) |
| Laetitia Salles | ?? | | | (France) |
| Fanny Gelis | ?? | | | (France) |
| Maylis Bonnin | ?? | | | (France) |
| Marie-Charlotte Hebel | ?? | | | (France) |
| Aline Sagols | ?? | | | (France) |
| Delphine Plantet | ?? | | | (France) |
| Lucie Canal | ?? | | | (France) |
| Julie Pujol | ?? | | | (France) |
| Christelle Le Duff | ?? | | | (France) |
| Estelle Sartini (c) | ?? | | | (France) (c) |
| Dalila Boukerma | ?? | | | (France) |
| Lucie Élodie | ?? | | | (France) |
| Catherine Devillers | ?? | | | (France) |
| Céline Allainmat | ?? | | | (France) |
| Anne-Sophie Canizares | ?? | | | (France) |
| Rosa Marcé | ?? | | | (France) |
| Clotilde Flaugère | ?? | | | (France) |
| Violaine Aubrée | ?? | | | (France) |
| Stéphanie Provost | ?? | | | (France) |
| Fanny Horta | ?? | | | (France) |
| Aurélie Cousseau | ?? | | | (France) |
| Corinne Devroute | ?? | | | (France) |
| Clémence Ollivier | ?? | | | (France) |
| Sandrine Jauréguiberry | ?? | | | (France) |
| Marion Talayrach | ?? | | | (France) |

=== United States ===
- Head coach: Kathy Flores
- Assistant coach: Candi Orsini
- Assistant Backs Coach: Krista McFarren

Note: Flags indicate national union for the club/province as defined by World Rugby.

| Player | Position | Date of birth (age) | Caps | Club/province |
|---|---|---|---|---|
| Hedwig Aerts | Fly-half | | | (United States) |
| Kristin Baja | Centre | | | (United States) |
| Claudia Braymer | ?? | | | (United States) |
| Jamie Burke | Prop | 15 October 1980 | | (United States) |
| Laura Cabrera | ?? | | | (United States) |
| Erin Carter | ?? | | | (United States) |
| Kate Cox | ?? | | | (United States) |
| Jen Crouse | ?? | | | (United States) |
| Carrie Dubray | ?? | | | (United States) |
| Ashley English | ?? | | | (United States) |
| Heather Hale | Centre | | | (United States) |
| Patty Jervey | Flanker | 29 March 1964 | | (United States) |
| Ellie Karvoski | ?? | | | (United States) |
| Lee Knight | ?? | | | (United States) |
| Phaidra Knight | Flanker | 4 July 1974 | | (United States) |
| Pam Kosanke | ?? | | | (United States) |
| Laura McDonald | ?? | | | (United States) |
| Kelly McMahon | ?? | | | (United States) |
| Danielle Miller | ?? | | | (United States) |
| Pat Neder | ?? | | | (United States) |
| Tina Nesberg | ?? | | | (United States) |
| Meredith Ottens | ?? | | | (United States) |
| Kate Pope | ?? | | | (United States) |
| Mari Wallace | ?? | | | (United States) |
| Keenya Warner | ?? | | | (United States) |
| Kristin Zdanczewicz | ?? | | | (United States) |

=== South Africa ===
- Head coach: Thobile Dunjwa
- Assistant coach: Jan Hanekom, Christie Noble

Note: Flags indicate national union for the club/province as defined by World Rugby.

| Player | Position | Date of birth (age) | Caps | Club/province |
|---|---|---|---|---|
| Zandile Nojoko | Fullback | | | (South Africa) Eastern Province |
| Yolanda Miering | Wing | | | (South Africa) Blue Bulls |
| Nomsa Tendekwana | Wing | | | (South Africa) Western Province |
| Ingrid Botha (c) | Centre | | | (South Africa) Blue Bulls (c) |
| Zolisa Noxeke | Centre | | | (South Africa) Border |
| Natasha Hofmeester | Wing | | | (South Africa) Boland |
| Marie-Lee Erasmus | Fly-half | | | (South Africa) Eastern Province |
| Magdalena Pylman | Fly-half | | | (South Africa) Blue Bulls |
| Saloma Booysen | Scrum-half | | | (South Africa) Eastern Province |
| Louise du Pisanie | Prop | | | (South Africa) Free State |
| Babalwa Vena | Hooker | | | (South Africa) Border |
| Cebisa Kula | Prop | | | (South Africa) Border |
| Dolly Mavumengwana | Lock | | | (South Africa) Border |
| Wendy Adlem | Lock | | | (South Africa) Eastern Province |
| Wendy Khumalo | Flanker | | | (South Africa) KwaZulu-Natal |
| Nadine Barnard | Flanker | | | (South Africa) Western Province |
| Mandisa Williams | Number 8 | 8 November 1984 (aged 21) | | (South Africa) Border |
| Yolanda Marais | ?? | | | (South Africa) Blue Bulls |
| Marijke Nel | Fullback | 17 December 1967 (aged 38) | | (South Africa) KwaZulu-Natal |
| Ramona Brown | Prop | | | (South Africa) Eastern Province |
| Noms Tsotsobe-Calata | Flanker | | | (South Africa) Eastern Province |
| Sipokazi Jonga | ?? | | | (South Africa) Border |
| Marie Schoeman | ?? | | | (South Africa) Blue Bulls |
| Lamla Momoti | ?? | | | (South Africa) Eastern Province |
| Fundiswa Plaatjie | ?? | | | (South Africa) Border |
| Namhla Siyolo | ?? | | | (South Africa) |

== Pool D ==
=== Canada ===
- Coach: Neil Langevin
- Assistant coach: Matthew Stephens

Note: Flags indicate national union for the club/province as defined by World Rugby.

| Player | Position | Date of birth (age) | Caps | Club/province |
|---|---|---|---|---|
| Ranie Burns | Second row | | | (Canada) Edmonton ep/Tigers |
| Leslie Cripps | Prop | | | (England) Saracens |
| Raquel Eldridge | Hooker | | | (England) London Wasps |
| Gillian Florence | Second row | | | (Canada) Ste. Anne de Bellevue |
| Megan Gibbs | Second row | | | (Canada) Irish Canadians/University of Western Ontario |
| Heather Jaques | Flanker | | | (Canada) Capilanos/Wild Oats |
| Allison Lamoureux | ?? | | | (Canada) Assassins RFC/University of Western Ontario |
| Maureen MacMahon | ?? | | | (Canada) Toronto Scottish |
| Dawn McDonald | ?? | | | (Canada) Velox Valkyries |
| Heather McDonald | ?? | | | (Canada) Edmonton Rockers |
| Lesley McKenzie | ?? | | | (Canada) Ravens |
| Katie Murray | ?? | | | (Canada) Edmonton Lep/Tigers |
| Erika Smortchevsky | ?? | | | (Canada) Capilanos |
| Summer Yeo | ?? | | | (Canada) Edmonton Rockers |
| Paige Burdett | ?? | | | (Canada) Lethbridge RFC/University of Lethbridge |
| Kim Donaldson | Hooker | 24 August 1983 | | (Canada) Aurora Barbarians/UBC |
| Jen Kryszak | ?? | | | (Canada) Irish Canadians/University of Western Ontario |
| Barbara Mervin | Back row | 1 April 1982 | | (Canada) Peterborough Pagan/sUniversity of Western Ontario |
| Sommer Christie | ?? | | | (Canada) Ste Anne de Bellevue |
| Erin Dance | ?? | | | (Canada) Montreal Barbarians |
| Julie Foster | Wing | | | (Canada) Regina Breakers |
| Maria Gallo | Wing | 21 September 1977 | | (Canada) Edmonton Lep/Tigers |
| Kristy Heemskerk | Centre | | | (Canada) Waterloo County/Sydney University |
| Mandy Marchak | Fullback | 24 November 1984 | | (Canada) Capilanos |
| Kelly McCallum (c) | Fly-half | | | (Australia) Sydney University (c) |
| Heather Moyse | Fullback | 23 July 1978 | | (Canada) Toronto Scottish |
| Anna Schnell | ?? | | | (Canada) Burnaby Lake |
| Kary Steele | ?? | | | (Canada) Burnaby Lake |
| Julia Sugawara | Scrum-half | 27 November 1982 | | (Canada) Burnaby Lake |
| Sarah Ulmer | Centre | | | (Canada) Burnaby Lake |
| Jayne Cation | Centre | | | (Canada) Brampton Beaves/University of Western Ontario |
| Colette McAuley | ?? | | | (Canada) Highland |

=== Scotland ===
Note: Flags indicate national union for the club/province as defined by World Rugby.

| Player | Position | Date of birth (age) | Caps | Club/province |
|---|---|---|---|---|
| Susie Brown | ?? | | | (Scotland) Hillhead/Jordanhill |
| Karen Findlay | ?? | 1968 | | (England) Richmond |
| Iona Frickleton | ?? | | | (Scotland) Watsonians |
| Donna Kennedy | Back row | 16 February 1972 | | (England) Worcester |
| Heather Lockhart | ?? | | | (Scotland) Hillhead/Jordanhill |
| Beth Macleod | ?? | | | (Scotland) Murrayfield Wanderers |
| Gillian McCord | ?? | | | (Scotland) Watsonians |
| Sarah Mee | ?? | | | (Scotland) Watsonians |
| Clare Muir | ?? | | | (England) Richmond |
| Lisa O'Keefe | ?? | | | (England) Richmond |
| Lynne Reid | ?? | | | (Scotland) RHC |
| Gail Russell | ?? | | | (Scotland) Hillhead/Jordanhill |
| Shona Watt | Flanker | 1975 | | (Scotland) Supermarine |
| Lindsay Wheeler | ?? | | | (Scotland) Watsonians |
| Paula Chalmers (c) | ?? | | | (Scotland) Murrayfield Wanderers (c) |
| Claire Cruickshank | ?? | | | (Scotland) Murrayfield Wanderers |
| Louise Dalgliesh | ?? | | | (Scotland) RHC |
| Lynsey Douglas | ?? | | | (Scotland) Murrayfield Wanderers/Worcester |
| Veronica Fitzpatrick | ?? | | | (Scotland) RHC |
| Erin Kerr | ?? | | | (England) Richmond |
| Sara Mears | ?? | | | (Scotland) Watsonians |
| Lucy Millard | ?? | | | (Scotland) Murrayfield Wanderers |
| Rachael Nicholson | ?? | | | (Scotland) Hillhead/Jordanhill |
| Chris Ovenden | ?? | | | (England) Richmond |
| Rimma Petlevannaya | ?? | | | (Scotland) Murrayfield Wanderers |
| Rhona Shepherd | ?? | | | (Scotland) Murrayfield Wanderers |

=== Samoa ===
Note: Flags indicate national union for the club/province as defined by World Rugby.

| Player | Position | Date of birth (age) | Caps | Club/province |
|---|---|---|---|---|
| Serena Curtis-Lemuelu | Prop | | | (Samoa) |
| Alaisalatemaota Bakulich-Leavasa | Hooker | 9 October 1979 | | (Samoa) |
| Denise Puna Tia | Prop | 3 January 1979 | | (Samoa) |
| Ainslie Maxene Sauvao (c) | Lock | | | (Samoa) (c) |
| Sunui Vanessa Chongnee | Lock | | | (Samoa) |
| Terisa Lealaisalanoa | Flanker | | | (Samoa) |
| E. Beets | Flanker | | | (Samoa) |
| Doris Ta'ala | Number 8 | | | (Samoa) |
| Tulua Leuluaiali'i | Scrum-half | | | (Samoa) |
| Bella Milo | Fly-half | | | (Samoa) |
| Amanda Kara Cahill | Wing | | | (Samoa) |
| Anita Kerrigan | Centre | | | (Samoa) |
| Rosalia Ioane | Centre | | | (Samoa) |
| Sosefina Petelo | Wing | | | (Samoa) |
| Valuese Sao Taliu | Fullback | | | (Samoa) |
| F. Leilua | Hooker | | | (Samoa) |
| F. Timoteo | Prop | | | (Samoa) |
| T. Waterhouse | Flanker | | | (Samoa) |
| Sharlene Fagalilo | Flanker | | | (Samoa) |
| S. Tiatia | Loose forward | | | (Samoa) |
| Lorina Papali'i | Wing | | | (Samoa) |
| Jessica Saolele | Wing | | | (Samoa) |
| Luisa Avaiki | Centre | 19 April 1973 | | (Samoa) |
| Diana Maele Sipili | Fly-half | | | (Samoa) |
