= 2006 Women's Six Nations Championship =

2006 rugby tournament

- Date: 4 February 2006 - 18 March 2006
- Countries: England; France; Ireland; Scotland; Spain; Wales

Tournament statistics
- Champions: England (7th title)
- Grand Slam: England (7th title)
- Triple Crown: England (10th title)
- Matches played: 15
- Top point scorer: (France) Estelle Sartini (33)
- Top try scorer: (England) Nicola Crawford (5)

The 2006 Women's Six Nations Championship, also known as the 2006 RBS Women's 6 Nations due to the tournament's sponsorship by the Royal Bank of Scotland, was the fifth series of the rugby union Women's Six Nations Championship and was won by England, who achieved the Grand Slam. This was the last Six Nations in which Spain took part - Italy were to replace them in 2007.

== Final table ==
| Position | Nation | Games | | | | Points | | | Table points |
| Position | Nation | Played | Won | Drawn | Lost | For | Against | Diff | Table points |
|---|---|---|---|---|---|---|---|---|---|
| 1 | England | 5 | 5 | 0 | 0 | 203 | 33 | +170 | 10 |
| 2 | Wales | 5 | 4 | 0 | 1 | 55 | 55 | 0 | 8 |
| 3 | France | 5 | 3 | 0 | 2 | 103 | 42 | +61 | 6 |
| 4 | Scotland | 5 | 2 | 0 | 3 | 33 | 62 | –29 | 4 |
| 5 | Ireland | 5 | 1 | 0 | 4 | 42 | 94 | –52 | 2 |
| 6 | Spain | 5 | 0 | 0 | 5 | 25 | 175 | –150 | 0 |

== Results ==
4 February 2006

| Ireland | 25–10 | Spain |

Donnybrook Stadium, Dublin

4 February 2006

| England | 38–15 | Wales |

Old Albanians, St Albans

5 February 2006

| Scotland | 3–23 | France |

Murrayfield Stadium, Edinburgh

10 February 2006

| France | 32–0 | Ireland |

Montauban, Toulouse

11 February 2006

| Spain | 3–86 | England |

La Ciudad Universitaria, Madrid

11 February 2006

| Wales | 5–0 | Scotland |

Sardis Road, Pontypridd

25 February 2006

| Ireland | 7–14 | Wales |

Donnybrook Stadium, Dublin

25 February 2006

| Scotland | 5–22 | England |

Murrayfield Stadium, Edinburgh

25 February 2006

| France | 38–0 | Spain |

Saint Jean De Luz, Biarritz

10 March 2006

| Wales | 10–0 | Spain |

Sardis Road, Pontypridd

10 March 2006

| Ireland | 0–9 | Scotland |

Navan

11 March 2006

| France | 0–28 | England |

Bondoufle, Paris

17 March 2006

| Wales | 11–10 | France |

Sardis Road, Pontypridd

17 March 2006

| England | 29–10 | Ireland |

Old Albanians, St Albans

18 March 2006

| Spain | 12–16 | Scotland |

La Ciudad Universitaria, Madrid

== Leading points scorers ==
| | Name | Nation | Points | Games | Pts/game |
|---|---|---|---|---|---|
| 1 | Estelle Sartini | France | 33 | 5 | 6.6 |
| 2 | Karen Andrew | England | 31 | 5 | 6.2 |
| 3 | Non Evans | Wales | 29 | 5 | 5.8 |
| 4 | Nicola Crawford | England | 25 | 5 | 5 |
| 5 | Susan Day | England | 20 | 5 | 4 |
| 6 | Helen Clayton | England | 20 | 5 | 4 |
| 7 | Daniella Waterman | England | 20 | 5 | 4 |
| 8 | Lucie Elodie | France | 20 | 5 | 4 |
| 9 | Paula Chalmers | Scotland | 18 | 5 | 3.6 |
| 10 | Michaela Staniford | England | 15 | 5 | 3 |
| 11 | Shelley Rae | England | 12 | 4 | 3 |
| 12 | Georgia Stevens | England | 10 | 5 | 2 |
| 13 | Delphine Plantet | France | 10 | 5 | 2 |
| 14 | Joy Neville | Ireland | 10 | 5 | 2 |
| 15 | Ines Etxeguibel | Spain | 10 | 5 | 2 |
| 16 | Amy Turner | England | 10 | 2 | 5 |
| 17 | Fanny Horta | France | 10 | 6 | 1.67 |
| 18 | Rachel Poolman | Wales | 10 | 5 | 2 |
| 19 | Sara Jane Belton | Ireland | 7 | 5 | 1.4 |
| 20 | Philippa Tuttiett | France | 6 | 1 | 6 |

== See also ==
- Women's Six Nations Championship
- Women's international rugby
