= Amy Williams (rugby union) =

New Zealand rugby player

- Born: 15 December 1986 (age 39)
- Height: 1.65 m (5 ft 5 in)
- Weight: 59 kg (130 lb)

Rugby union career
- Position: Wing
Senior career
Years	Team	Apps	(Points)
2015–2016	Bologna Women's		(0)
Provincial / State sides
Years	Team	Apps	(Points)
2003–2006	Hawke's Bay		(0)
International career
Years	Team	Apps	(Points)
2005–2006	New Zealand	8	(0)
Medal record
Representing New Zealand
Women's rugby union
Rugby World Cup
Gold medal – first place	2006 Canada	Team competition

Amy Williams (born 15 December 1986) is a female rugby union player. She represented New Zealand and Hawke's Bay.

Williams made her provincial debut for Hawke's Bay in 2003 while attending Karamu High School. In 2004, she played touch rugby for New Zealand's under 19 team. She has played for the Aotearoa Māori Sevens team.

Williams made her international debut as an 18 year old for the Black Ferns on 29 June 2005 against Scotland at Ottawa. She was in the squad that won their third Rugby World Cup title at the 2006 tournament in Canada.

In 2015, Williams began a 10-month stint with Bologna in Italy's Serie A competition and coached their under-16 girls team as well.
