= Shayler =

Shayler is an Anglo-Saxon surname originating in the Gloucestershire/Oxfordshire region of England. Alternative common spellings are Shaylor.

The name originates from the early medieval period and is of uncertain meaning, though it's thought to be a nickname for someone who 'shails', that is walks with a limp or crookedly.

== Notable people ==
Notable people with the surname include:

- David Shayler (born 1965), former British MI5 spy and conspiracy theorist
- Ernest Vincent Shayler (1868–1947), American Episcopal bishop
- Frank Shayler (1867–1954), British architect and conservator
- Francis & Catherine Shailer (19th century), pioneer farmers, namesake of the Shailer Park suburb of Queensland, Australia
- Kimberley Shaylor (born 1981), British rugby union player
