= Rachel Makata =

- Born: 10 July 1974 (age 52)
- Height: 1.7 m (5 ft 7 in)
- Weight: 77 kg (170 lb; 12 st 2 lb)

Rugby union career
- Position: Loose forward
Provincial / State sides
Years	Team	Apps	(Points)
2005	Auckland		
International career
Years	Team	Apps	(Points)
2006	New Zealand	2	(5)
Medal record
Representing New Zealand
Women's rugby union
Rugby World Cup
Gold medal – first place	2006 Canada	Team competition

Rachel Makata (nee Dolheguy; born 10 July 1974) is a former female rugby union player. She played for New Zealand internationally and for Auckland. She was in the squad that won the 2006 Rugby World Cup in Canada. Makata also represented Auckland's under 21 netball team.

Makata made only two appearances for the Black Ferns, she scored a try in her international debut at the 2006 Rugby World Cup on 4 September against Samoa. Her last appearance was against Scotland in the pool stages.
