= Paige Butcher =

Paige Butcher may refer to:

- Paige Butcher (model)
- Paige Butcher (rugby union)
