= Diane Maliukaetau =

- Born: 12 September 1986 (age 40)
- Height: 1.76 m (5 ft 9 1/2 in)
- Weight: 95 kg (209 lb; 14 st 13 lb)

Rugby union career
- Position: Prop
Provincial / State sides
Years	Team	Apps	(Points)
- Auckland
International career
Years	Team	Apps	(Points)
2005–2006	New Zealand	6	(5)
Medal record
Representing New Zealand
Women's rugby union
Rugby World Cup
Gold medal – first place	2006 Canada	Team competition

Diane Maliukaetau (born 12 September 1986) is a former female rugby union player. She played for New Zealand and Auckland. She was in the squad that won the 2006 Women's Rugby World Cup.

Maliukaetau was born in Tonga and moved to New Zealand in 1999 where she attended Tangaroa College.

Maliukaetau played six tests for the Black Ferns, including four at the 2006 Rugby World Cup when she was only 19. She scored a try in the opening match against Canada. She started in the final against England when they won their third title.

In 2010, She was named in the Black Ferns training squad ahead of the Rugby World Cup, but missed out on the final selection.
