= Monalisa Codling =

New Zealand rugby player

- Born: 20 April 1977 (age 49)
- Height: 1.78 m (5 ft 10 in)
- Weight: 82 kg (181 lb; 12 st 13 lb)

Rugby union career
- Position: Lock
Provincial / State sides
Years	Team	Apps	(Points)
1999–2008	Auckland		
1996–1998	Otago		
International career
Years	Team	Apps	(Points)
1998–2010	New Zealand	30	(25)
National sevens team
Years	Team		Comps
2000	Manu Sina Samoa 7s		
Medal record
Women's rugby union
Representing New Zealand
Rugby World Cup
Gold medal – first place	1998 Netherlands	Team competition
Gold medal – first place	2002 Spain	Team competition
Gold medal – first place	2006 Canada	Team competition
Gold medal – first place	2010 England	Team competition

Monalisa Codling (Urquhart; born 20 April 1977) is a former rugby union player for New Zealand and Auckland. She previously played for Otago. She also captained the Manu Sina Samoan 7s team to the Hong Kong 7s tournament in 2000.

Codling attended Kelston Girls' College and Waiheke High School and played for the Black Ferns from 1998 to 2010. The 2010 Rugby World Cup was her fourth successful World Cup. She was also a part of three other successful Rugby World Cup campaigns — 1998, 2002, and 2006.

Codling almost missed the 2002 Rugby World Cup because she had a serious case of chickenpox. She scored a try in the final just before halftime after running 40 metres.

Codling spent some time in the UK, working for the British Council as a Finance and Operations Manager.
