= Lito Fata =

Australian rugby player (born 1974)

- Born: 21 September 1974 (age 52) Kawakawa, New Zealand
- School: Bay of Islands College

Rugby union career
- Position: Wing
International career
Years	Team	Apps	(Points)
2006	Australia	2	(0)

Lito Fata (born 21 September 1974) is a former Australian rugby union player. She competed for Australia at the 2006 Rugby World Cup in Canada. She made only two appearances for the Wallaroos, both against the United States at the 2006 tournament.
