= Rachelle Pirie =

- Born: 12 January 1977 (age 49) Goulburn, NSW
- School: Marian College, Goulburn

Rugby union career
- Position: Fly Half
International career
Years	Team	Apps	(Points)
2006	Australia	2	(0)

Rachelle Pirie (born 12 January 1977) is a former Australian rugby union player.

Pirie competed for Australia in the 2006 Rugby World Cup in Canada. She made two test appearances for Australia at the tournament; she played against South Africa and the United States in the pool games. She was named as a replacement in the match against Ireland for seventh place, but did not get to run onto the field.
