= Waimania Teddy =

- Born: 13 February 1979 (age 47)
- Height: 1.67 m (5 ft 5 1/2 in)
- Weight: 70 kg (150 lb; 11 st 0 lb)

Rugby union career
- Position: Halfback
Provincial / State sides
Years	Team	Apps	(Points)
2005	Auckland		
International career
Years	Team	Apps	(Points)
2005–2007	New Zealand	7	(0)
Medal record
Representing New Zealand
Women's rugby union
Rugby World Cup
Gold medal – first place	2006 Canada	Team competition

Waimania Teddy (born 13 February 1979) is a former female rugby union player. She played for New Zealand and Auckland. She was in the Black Ferns squad that won the 2006 Women's Rugby World Cup.

In 2000, Teddy was part of the Auckland Storm team that defeated the Lady Waratahs 35–5 in a Super 12 curtain raiser at Eden Park. She played in the Black Ferns 33–8 win over England at Eden Park in 2005.

Teddy was also named in the Black Ferns side that faced the Wallaroos in the second of two tests in 2009.
