= Annette Finch =

- Born: 23 April 1980 (age 46) Nowra, NSW
- School: Canterbury College

Rugby union career
- Position: Prop
International career
Years	Team	Apps	(Points)
2006	Australia	1	(0)

Annette Jean Finch (née Crawford; born 23 April 1980) is a former Australian rugby union player. She competed for Australia at the 2006 Rugby World Cup in Canada. She made her sole appearance for the Wallaroos against the United States at the tournament, it was in the semi-finals of the 5th–8th place play-offs.

In 2019, Finch was part of the Classic Wallaroos team that played the Central North Women’s side in a ten-a-side match. She was one of three, newly appointed, members of the Classic Wallabies Board in July 2021.
