= Shannon Baker =

England international rugby union and rugby league footballer

- Born: 30 January 1980 (age 46)
- Height: 1.74 m (5 ft 9 in)
- Weight: 79 kg (174 lb; 12 st 6 lb)

Rugby union career
- Position: Flanker
Senior career
Years	Team	Apps	(Points)
- Richmond
International career
Years	Team	Apps	(Points)
2004-	England	9	
Medal record
Representing England
Women's rugby union
Rugby World Cup
Silver medal – second place	2006 Canada	Team competition

Shannon Baker (born 30 January 1980) is a New Zealand-born English rugby union player. She played for England at the 2006 Women's Rugby World Cup.
