= ASD Neapolis Rugby =

- Full name: ASD Neapolis Women's Rugby Team Campania Felix
- Founded: 2023; 3 years ago
- Ground: Villaggio del Rugby
- Coach: Luca Stornaiuolo
- League: Serie A Elite
- 2024–25: Serie A, Champions
1st kit	2nd kit

Official website
- www.neapolisrugbyfemminile.com

ASD Neapolis Rugby is an Italian women's rugby union club, based in Naples. They compete in the Serie A Elite competition, which is the top division of women's rugby in Italy.

== History ==
The team was established in 2023 after the merger of the women's teams of Amatori Napoli and Amatori Torre del Greco.

In their debut championship, Neapolis topped their group and entered the promotion play-offs as the second best placed team. They were beaten in the semifinal by Puma Bisenzio, although they drew on points in aggregate, they lost in terms of tries scored in the double-header.

The following season, they reached the play-offs once again having topped their group again. They defeated Riviera in the semi-final, an experienced club with six championship titles in Serie A Élite. They narrowly beat Parabiago 13–10 in the final to win their first championship title and earn a promotion to Serie A Élite, the top division.

== Honours ==
- Serie A:
  - Champion: 2024–25.
