= Katy Storie =

England international rugby union player

- Born: 7 August 1979 (age 47)
- Height: 1.72 m (5 ft 7 1/2 in)
- Weight: 90 kg (200 lb; 14 st 2 lb)

Rugby union career
- Position: Prop
Senior career
Years	Team	Apps	(Points)
- Clifton
International career
Years	Team	Apps	(Points)
2006-	England	24	(5)
–	England A		
Medal record
Representing England
Women's rugby union
Rugby World Cup
Silver medal – second place	2006 Canada	Team competition

Katy Elizabeth Storie (born 7 August 1979) is an English female rugby union player. She represented England at the 2006 Women's Rugby World Cup.

Storie was a weightlifter representing Great Britain before she discovered rugby while attending Newcastle University.
