= Vanessa Gray =

England international rugby union player

- Born: 16 May 1971 (age 55)
- Weight: 106 kg (16 st 10 lb)

Rugby union career
- Position: Prop Openside Flanker Number 8
Amateur team(s)
Years	Team	Apps	(Points)
3	Chichester RFC		
Senior career
Years	Team	Apps	(Points)
12	Wasps FC Richmond FC		(Unknown)
International career
Years	Team	Apps	(Points)
2004–2007	England	28	(5)
Medal record
Representing England
Women's rugby union
Rugby World Cup
Silver medal – second place	2006 Canada	Team competition

Vanessa Gray (born 16 May 1971) is a former English Rugby Union player. She represented England at the 2006 Women's Rugby World Cup. She started ahead of Sophie Hemming in the 2007 Six Nations clash against Ireland which they won 32–0.
