= Kimberley Shaylor =

England international rugby union player

- Born: 15 June 1981 (age 45)
- Height: 1.68 m (5 ft 6 in)
- Weight: 63 kg (139 lb; 9 st 13 lb)

Rugby union career
- Position: Wing
Senior career
| Years | Team | Apps | (Points) |
- Worcester
International career
| Years | Team | Apps | (Points) |
| | England | 20 | |
Medal record
Representing England
Women's rugby union
Rugby World Cup
| Silver medal – second place | 2006 Canada | Team competition |

Kimberley Shaylor (born 15 June 1981) is a former English female rugby union player. She represented England at the 2006 Women's Rugby World Cup. She and Nicola Crawford retired from international rugby after the 2006 World Cup. She retired so that she could study medicine at Birmingham University.

Kimberley is married to Jason and they have 3 children
