= Marijke Nel =

- Born: 17 December 1967 (age 58) Richards Bay, South Africa
- Notable relative: Philip J. Nel (grandfather)
- Occupation: Technical Director

Rugby union career
- Position: fly-half
Senior career
Years	Team	Apps	(Points)
.	Wasps Ladies		
Provincial / State sides
Years	Team	Apps	(Points)
.	Blue Bulls		
International career
Years	Team	Apps	(Points)
2005–06	South Africa		

Marijke Nel (born 17 December 1967) is a South African-born Canadian tennis player and former women's international rugby union fly-half from Richards Bay, KwaZulu-Natal, South Africa. She played rugby until 2006 when she moved to Canada to coach tennis. She is the granddaughter of the former South Africa national rugby union team captain, Philip J. Nel.

== Rugby ==
After time at Kansas State University in the United States, Nel started playing rugby for Wasps Ladies in England as a fly-half. She then moved back to South Africa to play for Blue Bulls when competitive women's rugby started in South Africa. She made her international debut for the South Africa women's national rugby union team in 2005 during a tour to England. When South Africa travelled to Canada to take part in the 2006 Women's Rugby World Cup, Nel liked Canada so much she decided to settle there.

== Tennis ==
Nel started her time in Canada as a tennis coach in Bayers Lake, Nova Scotia before becoming the technical director for Tennis Nova Scotia. She continued to play tennis and in 2016 won the doubles at the Senior National Championships. This would have meant that she was eligible to represent Canada at the 2017 ITF Young Seniors World Championships; however she was not a Canadian citizen. Following a request to her local Member of Parliament to fast track her citizenship application, her Canadian citizenship was granted in time to allow Nel to compete at the tournament in South Africa. During the tournament, she lost both her women's and mixed doubles matches as well as her singles tournament match in the first round however she did reach the final of the consolation bracket.
