= Kim Oliver (rugby union) =

England international rugby union player

- Born: 1 September 1983 (age 43) Bath, England
- Height: 1.74 m (5 ft 9 in)
- Weight: 77 kg (170 lb)

Rugby union career
- Position(s): Flyhalf, Centre
Senior career
Years	Team	Apps	(Points)
- Bristol
International career
Years	Team	Apps	(Points)
2005–2013	England	43	
–	England Academy		
–	England U-18		
–	England A		
Medal record
Representing England
Women's rugby union
Rugby World Cup
Silver medal – second place	2010 England	Team competition
Silver medal – second place	2006 Canada	Team competition

Kimberley Oliver (born 1 September 1983) is a former English rugby union player. She represented England at the 2006 and 2010 Women's Rugby World Cups. She retired from international rugby in 2013.

Oliver is Head Coach for Bristol Bears Women. She has a black belt in Judo.
