= Serie A (women's rugby union) =

- Sport: Rugby union
- Founded: 2022; 4 years ago
- First season: 2022
- No. of teams: 18
- Country: Italy
- Most recent champion: Neapolis (1st title) (Serie A 2024–25)
- Most titles: Calvisano; Volvera; Neapolis (1 title each)
- Level on pyramid: Level 2
- Promotion to: Serie A Elite
- Website: federugby.it

Serie A is the second division of the national women's rugby union competition in Italy. It was established by the Italian Rugby Federation in 2022, it took over the name from the first division championship, which adopted it for the previous 31 editions before being renamed Eccellenza and then Serie A Elite in 2023.

Calvisano won the inaugural Serie A 2022–23 season.

== Teams ==
Teams competing in the 2025–26 Serie A season:

| Group A | Group B | Group C |
|---|---|---|
| CUS Genova | Calvisano | Amatori Catania |
| CUS Milano (Reserve team) | CUS Piemonte Orientale | Anconitana |
| Riviera (Mira) | Highlanders Formigine | Bisceglie |
| Romagna | Forum Iulii (Udine) | Le Brigantesse (Catania) |
| Roma Women | Ivrea | CUS L’Aquila |
| Volvera | Linci (Milano) | Scandicci |

== Champions ==
| Season | Winner | Runner-up |
|---|---|---|
| 2022–23 | Calvisano | Volvera |
| 2023–24 | Volvera | Puma Bisenzio |
| 2024–25 | Neapolis | Parabiago |
| 2025–26 | TBD | TBD |
