= Paige Butcher (rugby union) =

- Born: 18 June 1974 (age 52) Wollongong, NSW
- School: Oak Flats High School

Rugby union career
- Position: Lock
International career
Years	Team	Apps	(Points)
2001–2006	Australia	5	(0)

Paige Erin Butcher (born 18 June 1974) is a former Australian rugby union player. She was named in Australia's squad for the 2006 Rugby World Cup in Canada.Wallaroos 10–24 loss to France in their second pool game. She started in the seventh place playoff against Ireland, Australia won 18–14.

Butcher made her test debut for Australia in 2001 against England at Sydney. Her final appearance for the Wallaroos was against Ireland at the 2006 World Cup.
