= Tobie McGann =

- Born: 4 August 1982 (age 44)
- Height: 1.75 m (5 ft 9 in)
- Weight: 69 kg (152 lb)

Rugby union career
- Position: Flyhalf
International career
Years	Team	Apps	(Points)
2006–2010	Australia	12	(0)
National sevens team
Years	Team		Comps
- Australia

Tobie McGann (born 4 August 1982) is a former Australian rugby union player. She competed for Australia in the 2006 and 2010 Women's Rugby World Cups. She also represented the Australian sevens team that won the 2009 Rugby World Cup Sevens.

== Career ==
McGann represented Australia from 2006 to 2010. She was a member of the Wallaroos squad to the 2006 and 2010 Rugby World Cup that finished in third place.

In 2007, she was named in a 22-player squad that toured New Zealand in October. She was part of the 2009 Rugby World Cup Sevens champion team.

She was inducted into the NSW Waratahs inaugural Hall of Fame in June 2024.
