= Jennifer Lyne =

England international rugby union player (born 1972)

- Born: 29 May 1972 (age 54) Chichester, West Sussex, England
- Height: 1.78 m (5 ft 10 in)
- Weight: 74 kg (11 st 9 lb)

Rugby union career
- Position: Blindside Flanker / Lock
Senior career
Years	Team	Apps	(Points)
- Richmond, Saracens
International career
Years	Team	Apps	(Points)
15	England	38	
Medal record
Representing England
Women's rugby union
Rugby World Cup
Silver medal – second place	2006 Canada	Team competition
Silver medal – second place	2002 Spain	Team competition

Jennifer Lyne (née Philips, Richardson) (born 29 May 1972) is a British former rugby union player who played at both Blindside Flanker and Lock for England.

Lyne started her career at the Chichester RFC, before playing for Crawley, Richmond and Saracens first teams. She was selected for her first England match against Wales, where she came on as a replacement to score her first international try. She was part of the England squad that beat New Zealand Black Ferns at home during an international tour in June 2001, ending a 10-year unbeaten track record for the Black Ferns.

Lyne was part of the Five and then Six Nations Grand Slam winning squad in 1999, 2000, 2001, 2003 and 2006. She played at the 2002 Women's Rugby World Cup in Barcelona, starting at Blindside Flanker in the final and again in the 2006 Women's Rugby World Cup in Edmonton, Canada, starting at Lock (5) in the final.

Lyne retired from rugby after 2006 along with a few members of the 2006 squad. She remains the only woman to have started 2 consecutive World Cup Finals having given birth to two children between the two World Cups.
