= Stephanie Mortimer =

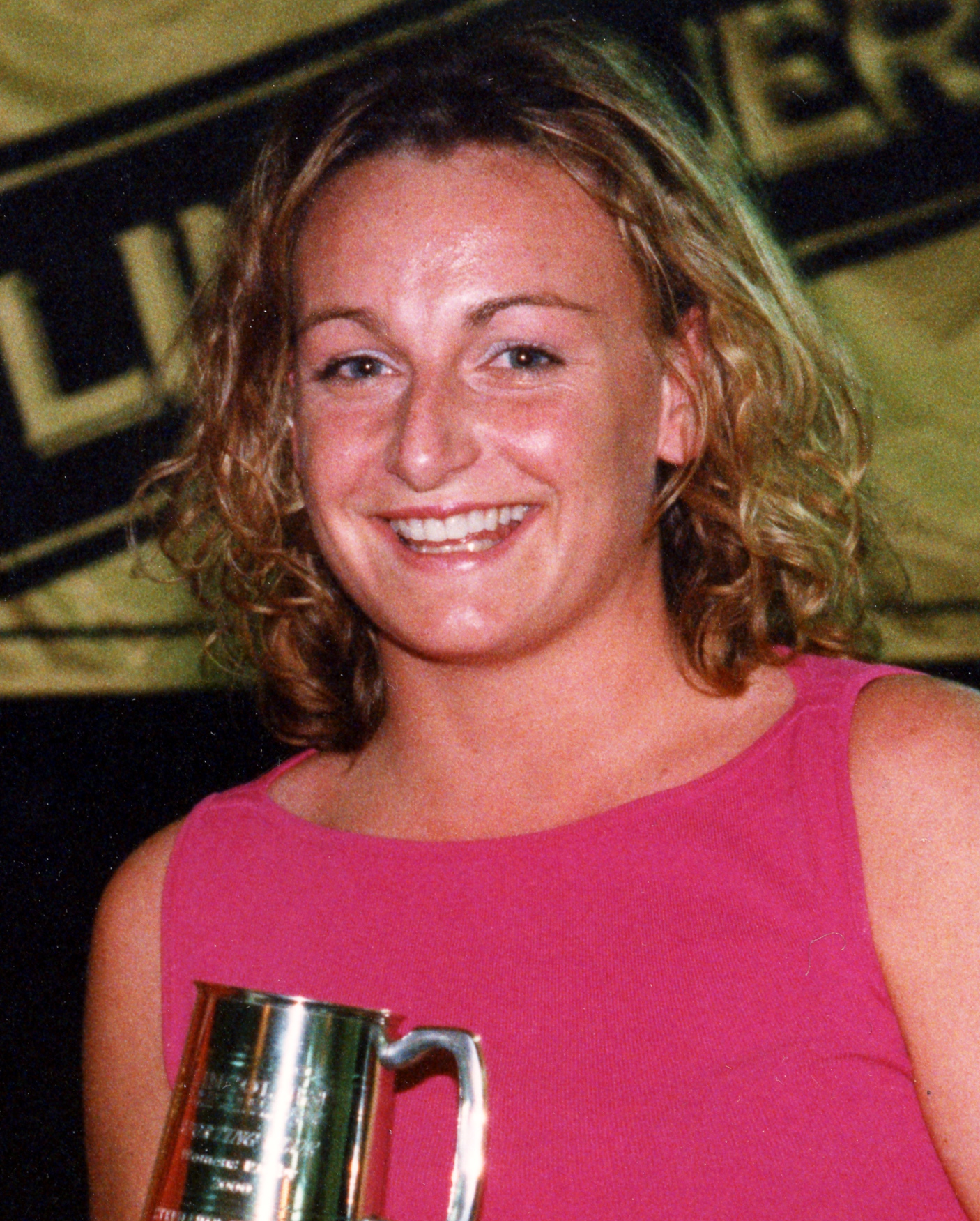
- Mortimer in 2000
- Born: 2 October 1981 (age 45)
- Height: 1.67 m (5 ft 5 1/2 in)
- Weight: 68 kg (150 lb; 10 st 10 lb)

Rugby union career
- Position: Wing
Provincial / State sides
Years	Team	Apps	(Points)
1999	Canterbury		(0)
International career
Years	Team	Apps	(Points)
2003–2006	New Zealand	12	(50)
Medal record
Representing New Zealand
Women's rugby union
Rugby World Cup
Gold medal – first place	2006 Canada	Team competition

Stephanie Broomhall (née Mortimer; born 2 October 1981) is a former New Zealand rugby union player. She played for New Zealand and Canterbury. She was part of the squad that won the 2006 Rugby World Cup.

== Rugby career ==
Broomhall made her international debut on 4 October 2003 against a World XV's team at Auckland. She was named NZ Woman's player of the year in 2004.

Broomhall featured for the Black Ferns at the 2005 Canada Cup. She scored a brace of tries in their 32–5 victory against Canada.

In 2006, She busted her knee playing for her Christchurch club. She was a member of the Black Ferns squad that won the 2006 Rugby World Cup.

In 2022, she joined Canterbury's Farah Palmer Cup coaching team.

== Personal life ==
Broomhall has four children and a stepson. Her brother-in-law is former All Black, Sam Broomhall.
