= Catherine Spencer (rugby union) =

England international rugby union player

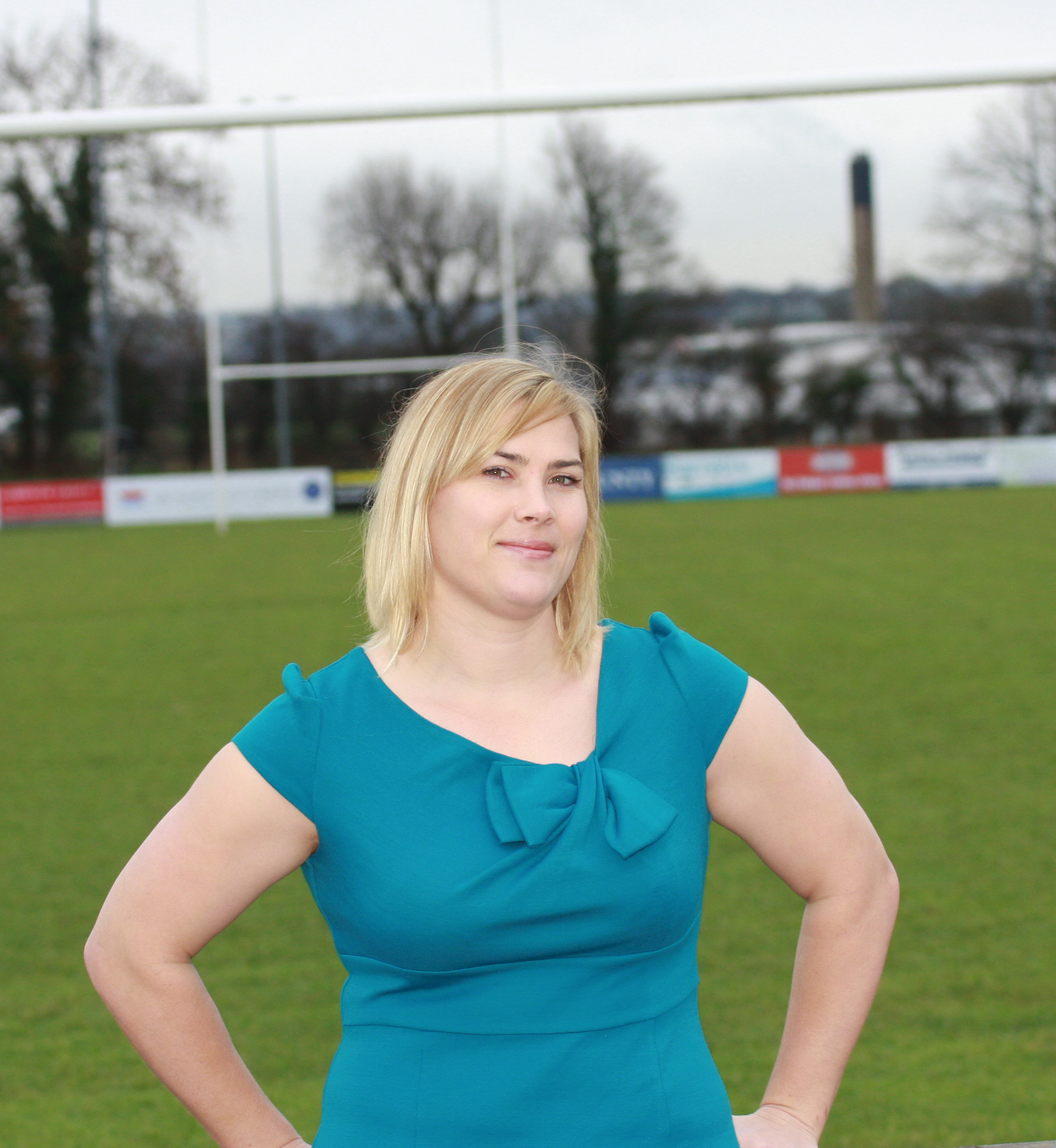
- Born: May 25, 1979 (age 47) Ashford, Kent
- Height: 1.79 m (5 ft 10 1/2 in)
- Weight: 90 kg (200 lb; 14 st 2 lb)

Rugby union career
- Position: No. 8
Senior career
Years	Team	Apps	(Points)
1994–2006	Folkestones		
2006–2008	Worcester Valkyries		
2008	Bath		
2009–2011	Bristol Ladies		
- Cardiff University
2011–2016	Aylesford Bulls Ladies		
International career
Years	Team	Apps	(Points)
2004–2011	England	63	(90)
Medal record
Representing England
Women's rugby union
Rugby World Cup
Silver medal – second place	2010 England	Team competition
Silver medal – second place	2006 Canada	Team competition

Catherine Spencer (born 25 May 1979) is a former English female rugby union player. She was selected as captain in 2007. She captained England at the 2010 Women's Rugby World Cup and was also a member of the squad to the 2006 World Cup.

Spencer retired from international rugby in 2011. Spencer scored 18 tries for England, played in 8 six nations 04, 05, 06, 07, 08, 09, 10, 11 won 6 as well as 5 grand slams. Her awards have included England Player of the Year in 2006, the Rugby Union Writers Club Award in 2010, and the Linda Uttley Award in 2011.

Spencer played for Worcester, Bristol and Aylesford Bulls Ladies and has now completely retired from playing rugby.

Spencer ran her own successful women's speaker agency Inspiring women until the global pandemic put a stop to in person speaking events. Because of the pandemic, she made the decision to become a teacher and now teaches at a school not far from where she grew up.

Spencer was awarded an honorary doctorate from Canterbury Christ Church University in September 2018 for significantly raising the profile of women's rugby through her leadership and continuing to inspire girls and women.

In 2022, Spencer commentated on matches for ITV for the 2021 Rugby World Cup.
