= Ellie Karvoski =

American rugby union player

- University: Northwestern University

Rugby union career
- Position: wing
Amateur team(s)
Years	Team	Apps	(Points)
- New York RFC
International career
Years	Team	Apps	(Points)
2002-	United States		
National sevens team
Years	Team		Comps
- United States

Ellie Karvoski is an American former national field hockey and rugby union fifteens and sevens player. She participated in the 2002 and 2006 Rugby World Cup's, and the 2009 Rugby Sevens World Cup. Karvoski is considered one of the top ten North American women rugby players.

Karvoski played for several years as a national field hockey player after graduating university. She started playing rugby at the age of twenty seven. Recognized for her talent on the pitch, Karvoski was twice named to the World Rugby Cup All-World team.
