= Linda Uttley =

English rugby union footballer (1966–2009)

- Born: 26 October 1966 Barnes, London, England
- Died: 27 November 2009 (aged 43) Esher, Surrey, England

Rugby union career
Amateur team(s)
Years	Team	Apps	(Points)
1989-1995	Teddington Rugby Club		
Senior career
Years	Team	Apps	(Points)
1995-2007	Wasps		
International career
Years	Team	Apps	(Points)
1997-2007	England		
Medal record
Representing England
Women's rugby union
Rugby World Cup
Bronze medal – third place	1998 Netherlands	Team competition

Linda Pauline Uttley (26 October 1966 – 27 November 2009) was an English rugby union footballer.

She was born in Barnes, London and was the youngest of eight siblings. Her rugby career began in 1989 at Teddington Rugby Club. She moved to Wasps Rugby Club in 1995 and won her first international cap in 1997, the start of her career with the Women's England Team. She won a total of thirteen caps, playing in every position except full-back, hooker and prop, and was a member of the squads in the Five Nations and World Cup in 1998. She went on to play for the Classic Lionesses in Bermuda in 2000.

In November 2007 she was diagnosed with 'end-stage' leiomyosarcoma, a rare and aggressive cancer. Despite her illness, she continued to work for the Rugby Football Union and toured with the England Lionesses. She died on 27 November 2009 at Princess Alice Hospice in Esher at the age of 43. She remains the only deceased capped Englishwoman.

Since then, winners of the RFU Linda Uttley Award, in recognition of the commitment and dedication of an individual, have included Sophie Hemming and Catherine Spencer.
