= Georgia Stevens =

England international rugby union player

- Born: Georgia Ruth Stevens; 13 June 1973 (age 53)
- Height: 1.71 m (5 ft 7 1/2 in)
- Weight: 79 kg (174 lb; 12 st 6 lb)

Rugby union career
- Position: Flanker
Senior career
Years	Team	Apps	(Points)
- Clifton
International career
Years	Team	Apps	(Points)
1998–????	England	71	(45)
Medal record
Representing England
Women's rugby union
Rugby World Cup
Silver medal – second place	2006 Canada	Team competition
Silver medal – second place	2002 Spain	Team competition
Bronze medal – third place	1998 Netherlands	Team competition

Georgia Ruth Stevens (born 13 June 1973) is a former English female rugby union player. She represented England at the 1998, 2002 and 2006 Women's Rugby World Cup. She scored two tries in England's 69-7 win over Wales in the 2003 Women's Six Nations.
