= Helen Clayton =

England international rugby union player

- Born: 17 June 1971 (age 55) Billinge Higher End, Greater Manchester
- Height: 1.67 m (5 ft 5 1/2 in)
- Weight: 71 kg (157 lb; 11 st 3 lb)

Rugby union career
- Position: Flanker
Senior career
| Years | Team | Apps | (Points) |
- Saracens
International career
| Years | Team | Apps | (Points) |
| 1994-2006 | England | 87 | (90) |
Medal record
Representing England
Women's rugby union
Rugby World Cup
| Silver medal – second place | 2006 Canada | Team competition |
| Silver medal – second place | 2002 Spain | Team competition |
| Bronze medal – third place | 1998 Netherlands | Team competition |

Helen Victoria Clayton (born 17 June 1971) is a former English female rugby union player born in Billinge Higher End near Wigan. She represented England at the 1998, 2002 and 2006 Women's Rugby World Cup. She retired after the 2006 World Cup. She is currently the manager of HITZ Rugby, a community programme run by Premiership Rugby.
