= Selena Rudge =

England international rugby union player

- Born: 5 November 1975 (age 51) Auckland, New Zealand
- Height: 1.62 m (5 ft 4 in)
- Weight: 76 kg (168 lb; 12 st 0 lb)

Rugby union career
- Position: Hooker
Senior career
Years	Team	Apps	(Points)
- Wasps
International career
Years	Team	Apps	(Points)
2000–????	England	47	(50)
Medal record
Representing England
Women's rugby union
Rugby World Cup
Silver medal – second place	2006 Canada	Team competition
Silver medal – second place	2002 Spain	Team competition

Selena Helen Rudge (born 5 November 1975) is a New Zealand-born English rugby union player. She represented England at the 2002 and 2006 Women's Rugby World Cup.
