= Estelle Sartini =

French rugby union player

- Born: 1 June 1973 (age 53)
- Height: 1.56 m (5 ft 1 in)
- Weight: 63 kg (139 lb)

Rugby union career
- Position: Winger
Senior career
Years	Team	Apps	(Points)
?–2008	Caen Rugby Club		
- Correct as of 12 January 2021
International career
Years	Team	Apps	(Points)
1998–2008	France	89	
- Correct as of 12 January 2021

Estelle Sartini (born 1 June 1973) is a French former rugby union player, who captained the France women's national rugby union team. She made 89 appearances for France between 1998 and 2008.

== Personal life ==
Aside from rugby, Sartini has worked as a physical education teacher, in Caen and later Versailles.

== Career ==
Sartini originally played association football, before switching to rugby union at the age of 16. Sartini was a winger. At club level, Sartini played for Caen Rugby Club. Between 1998 and 2008, she played in 11 consecutive semi-finals of the French women's Premier Division, and was part of the Caen team that lost four finals between 2003 and 2007.

At international level, Sartini made 89 appearances for the France women's national rugby union team. In the 2001 Women's Five Nations Championship, she scored a try against Ireland. France scored 9 tries in the match. She was part of the French team that won the Grand Slam in the 2002 Women's Six Nations Championship, and was in their squad for the 2002 Women's Rugby World Cup. In 2005, Sartini was captain of the France team, and she also captained the side at the 2006 Women's Rugby World Cup.

Sartini retired from rugby in 2008, to move from Caen to Versailles. Between 2012 and 2017, she worked as a commentator for France Télévisions channel France4, and she was also a reporter for Yahoo Sports during the 2014 Women's Rugby World Cup in France.
