= Sophie Hemming =

England international rugby union player

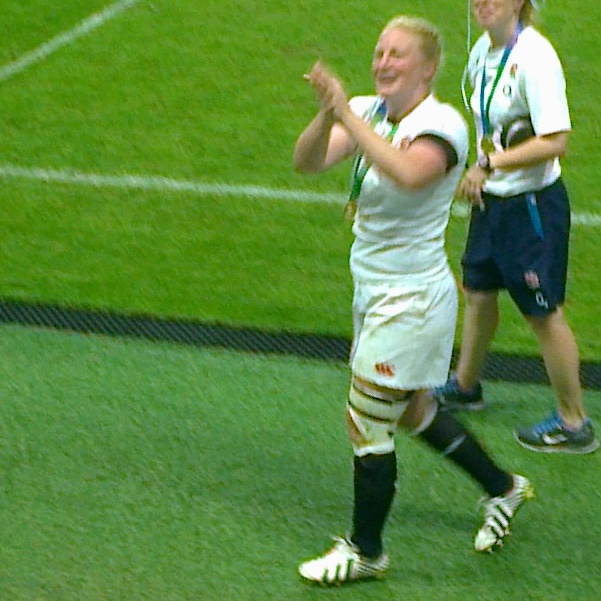
- Hemming in 2014
- Born: 20 June 1980 (age 46) Norwich, Norfolk, England
- Height: 1.7 m (5 ft 7 in)
- Weight: 83 kg (183 lb; 13 st 1 lb)

Rugby union career
- Position: Prop
International career
Years	Team	Apps	(Points)
	England	71	
Medal record
Representing England
Women's rugby union
Rugby World Cup
Gold medal – first place	2014 France	Team competition
Silver medal – second place	2010 England	Team competition

Sophie Alexandra Hemming (born 20 June 1980) is an English former rugby union player with 71 caps. She represented England at the 2010 Women's Rugby World Cup and was also named in the squad to the 2014 Women's Rugby World Cup. She also won the RFU Linda Uttley Award in recognition of her dedication and commitment.

Hemming attended Norwich High School for Girls. Outside rugby, Hemming is a veterinarian. Her rugby career required for her to make significant adjustments to her profession, transitioning from a farmyard to a domestic vet. She said that this change helped her plan her training and reduced the physical exhaustion that came with her demanding job of treating farm animals.

Currently, she is a national Elite XC bike racer for BW Cycling.
