= Karen Andrew =

England international rugby union player

- Born: 14 April 1976 (age 50)
- Height: 1.73 m (5 ft 8 in)
- Weight: 70 kg (154 lb)

Rugby union career
- Position: Flyhalf
Senior career
Years	Team	Apps	(Points)
- Saracens
International career
Years	Team	Apps	(Points)
2000–????	England	42	(221)
Medal record
Representing England
Women's rugby union
Rugby World Cup
Silver medal – second place	2006 Canada	Team competition

Karen Elizabeth Andrew (born 14 April 1976) is a former English female rugby union player. She represented England at the 2006 Women's Rugby World Cup. She played in the final against the Black Ferns in the 2006 World Cup and she kicked a penalty and a conversion but could not help her side win.
