= Nicola Crawford =

England international rugby union player

- Born: 20 November 1971 (age 54)
- Height: 1.7 m (5 ft 7 in)
- Weight: 67 kg (148 lb; 10 st 8 lb)

Rugby union career
- Position: Wing
Senior career
Years	Team	Apps	(Points)
	Worcester		(0)
International career
Years	Team	Apps	(Points)
1997–2006	England	65	(300)
Medal record
Representing England
Women's rugby union
Rugby World Cup
Silver medal – second place	2006 Canada	Team competition
Silver medal – second place	2002 Spain	Team competition
Bronze medal – third place	1998 Netherlands	Team competition

Nicola Crawford (née Brown; born 20 November 1971) is a former English rugby union player. She competed for England at the 1998, 2002 and 2006 Rugby World Cups.

== Rugby career ==
Crawford discovered rugby while attending the University Officer Training Corps in Bristol. She began her rugby career with Pershore before moving to Worcester. She played in the 1998 and 2002 Rugby World Cups.

In 2001, she starred on the wing for England in their opening match victory over Wales in the Five Nations Championship. She was named England player of the year by the RFU at their awards ceremony at Twickenham in 2002.

In the 2004 Six Nations Championship, she scored a hat-trick in her 51st test appearance for England against Ireland at Twickenham. She also crossed the try-line in her sides 53–3 thrashing of Wales at The Stoop.

Crawford noted a try in their opening match against Wales at the 2006 Six Nations Championship. She later recorded a hat-trick in her sides 86–3 victory against Spain in Madrid. She represented England at the 2006 Women's Rugby World Cup. She ran in two tries against South Africa in their pool game at the 2006 Rugby World Cup.

Crawford retired from international rugby after 65 appearances and the 2006 World Cup. She also became the first women's player to score 60 international tries.
