= 2006 Women's Rugby World Cup =

Rugby union event held in Canada

Coupe du monde de rugby féminin 2006

Tournament details
- Host nation: Canada
- Dates: 31 August – 17 September 2006
- No. of nations: 12

Final positions
- Champions: New Zealand (3rd title)
- Runner-up: England

Tournament statistics
- Matches played: 30
- Tries scored: 179 (average 5.97 per match)
- Top scorer(s): (Canada) Heather Moyse (35)
- Most tries: (Canada) Heather Moyse (7)
- Points scored: 1,156 (average 38.53 per match)

The 2006 Women's Rugby World Cup (officially IRB Rugby World Cup 2006 Canada) took place in Edmonton, Alberta, Canada. The tournament began on 31 August and ended on 17 September 2006. The 2006 tournament was the third World Cup approved by the International Rugby Board (IRB), the previous two being held 2002 in Spain and in the Netherlands, in 1998. The Black Ferns of New Zealand won the 2006 World Cup, defeating England in the final, as they had in 2002. It was New Zealand's third successive title.

The semi-finals were also direct repeats of the 2002 tournament – in fact five of the top six places in the final rankings were unchanged. Elsewhere the USA advanced from 7th in 2002 to 5th, and Ireland climbed from 14th to 8th while Australia (5th to 7th), Spain (8th to 9th), and Samoa (9th to 10th) slipped down.

The period prior to the competition had not been without controversy. The decision to award the hosting of the competition to Canada ahead of a strong bid from England surprised many.

In addition – apart from in Asia – there were no qualifying tournaments for the 2006 World Cup. Instead teams were invited to take part by the IRB with selection based on performances at the World Cup in 2002 and in international matches between 2002 and 2005. This resulted in accusations of a lack of clarity in regard to some selection decisions. In particular the awarding of the final place in the tournament to Samoa instead of Wales (following a poor performance by Wales in the 2005 Six Nations) was the cause of some controversy and comment prior to the event.

== Qualifiers ==
=== Asia ===
3 June 2005

Hong Kong	0–78	Japan

Bangkok

3 June 2005

Thailand	0–67	Kazakhstan

Bangkok

5 June 2005

Thailand	20–18	Hong Kong

Bangkok

5 June 2005

Kazakhstan	19–3	Japan

Bangkok

Kazakhstan qualify

== Tickets and sponsorship ==
Tickets had been available since July 2006 and they could be purchased online at Ticketmaster or by phone. There were individual and student tickets (for each of six match days), tickets for youth teams and clubs, corporate packages and a special "World Cup Pack" of $125 allowing access to all matches including the finals.
The partners of this tournament were Toyota "Never Quit" Awards Program, Molson, Tait Radio Communications, Glentel, Budget, University of Alberta, Edmonton Airports and Clubfit. The event was covered by English language network Global TV, daily newspaper Edmonton Journal and radio stations CFRN 1260, CFBR 100.3 and CFMG 104.9.
All matches were filmed and for the first time were available via streamed media. The final was also broadcast live on TV in a number of countries, including the United Kingdom, and a one-hour TV highlights programme was produced by IMG for wider distribution, while these recordings are held as part of the IRB's World Cup archive.

== Match officials ==
On 6 July 2006, the IRB Referee Selection Committee announced the appointment of match officials, with twelve women officials selected for the tournament consisting of eight referees and four touch judges. This panel was assisted by experienced international referees George Ayoub, Lyndon Bray, Malcolm Changleng and Simon McDowell, who were appointed in April. Other three touch judges from Canada Rugby Union were included in the final list.

REFEREES
George Ayoub (Australia)
Jenny Bental (South Africa)
Rachel Boyland (Switzerland)
Lyndon Bray (New Zealand)
Malcolm Changleng (Scotland)
Sarah Corrigan (Australia)
Clare Daniels (England)
Christine Hanizet (France)
Joyce Henry (Canada)
Nicky Inwood (New Zealand)
Kerstin Ljungdahl (Germany)
Simon McDowell (Ireland)

TOUCH JUDGES
Debbie Innes (England)
Kristina Mellor (New Zealand)
Kristi Moorman (Canada)
Sandy Nesbitt (Canada)
Kim Smit (South Africa)
Dana Teagarden (United States)
Todd Van Vliet (Canada)

== Format ==
The competition was contested over 18 days between 12 teams, allocated to four pools of three and structured into two parts:

- a pool stage, with 18 matches played from 31 August to 8 September;
- a knockout stage, divided in semifinals and finals, played from 12 to 17 September.

=== Pool stage ===
The first three match days saw a cross-pool league system in operation, with Pool A playing Pool D and Pool B playing Pool C, with points going towards one single division table for all four pools. Classification within each pool was based on the following scoring system:

- four points for a win;
- two points for a draw;
- zero points for a loss of 8 points or more.

Bonus points were awarded for teams scoring 4 tries or more and losing by 7 points or less. No extra time were played.
Teams were ranked 1–12 on the basis of the most match points. If two teams were equal on match points for any position, then the following criteria would be used in this order until one of the teams could be determined as the higher ranked:

- the winner of the match between the two teams;
- the best differential between points scored for and points scored against;
- the best differential between tries scored for and against;
- the most points scored;
- the most tries scored;
- the toss of a coin.

=== Knockout stage ===
After three match days, with each team having played three pool matches, positional semifinals were played with the top four-positioned sides vying to make the Women's Rugby World Cup final and all other sides playing matches in the final two rounds to decide tournament rankings.

If no winner could be determined within the time allowed, two teams should have played an extra time of 10 minutes each way with an interval of 5 and then eventually a kicking competition.

== Pools ==
=== Pool A ===
Team	Pld	W	D	L	PF	PA	PD	Pts
New Zealand	3	3	0	0	137	7	+130	14
Spain	3	1	0	2	14	115	−101	4
Kazakhstan	3	0	0	3	22	97	−75	0

=== Pool B ===
Team	Pld	W	D	L	PF	PA	PD	Pts
England	3	3	0	0	119	16	+103	14
Australia	3	1	0	2	84	46	+38	6
Ireland	3	1	0	2	48	67	−19	5

=== Pool C ===
Team	Pld	W	D	L	PF	PA	PD	Pts
France	3	2	0	1	75	37	+38	10
United States	3	2	0	1	34	35	−1	9
South Africa	3	0	0	3	20	179	−159	0

=== Pool D ===
Team	Pld	W	D	L	PF	PA	PD	Pts
Canada	3	2	0	1	131	71	+60	10
Scotland	3	2	0	1	56	38	+18	10
Samoa	3	1	0	2	32	64	−32	5

== Pool matches ==
=== Round one ===
31 August 2006	New Zealand	66–7	Canada	Ellerslie Rugby Park, Edmonton

31 August 2006	Spain	0–24	Scotland	St. Albert Rugby Park, St. Albert

31 August 2006	Kazakhstan	0–20	Samoa	Ellerslie Rugby Park, Edmonton

31 August 2006	England	18–0	United States	St. Albert Rugby Park, St. Albert

31 August 2006	Australia	68–12	South Africa	Ellerslie Rugby Park, Edmonton
	Try: Tobie McGann (7', 21'); Ruan Sims (12', 39', 54', 79'); Tricia Brown (16', 43', 64'); Kate Porter (76'); Con: Tobie McGann (8', 13', 39'); Kelli Donnelly (65', 77', 80'); Pen: Tobie McGann (48'), Kelli Donnelly (58')	Report	Try: Zolisa Noxeke (26'); Mandisa Williams (69'); Con: Marijke Nel (70')	Referee: Nicky Inwood (New Zealand)

31 August 2006	Ireland	0–43	France	St. Albert Rugby Park, St. Albert

=== Round two ===
4 September 2006	New Zealand	50–0	Samoa	St. Albert Rugby Park, St. Albert

4 September 2006	England	74–8	South Africa	Ellerslie Rugby Park, Edmonton
	Try: Nicola Crawford (4', 20'); Sue Day (35', 42', 55', 68'); Shelley Rae (39'); Rochelle Clark (49'); Rachael Burford (61'); Selena Rudge (70'); Joanne Yapp (73'); Charlotte Barras (79') Tries; Con: Shelley Rae (5', 21', 36', 50', 69', 71', 80')	Report	Try: Wendy Khumalo (62'); Pen: Marijke Nel (52')	Referee: Sarah Corrigan (Australia)

4 September 2006	Canada	79–0	Spain	St. Albert Rugby Park, St. Albert

4 September 2006	Australia	10–24	France	Ellerslie Rugby Park, Edmonton

4 September 2006	Kazakhstan	17–32	Scotland	St. Albert Rugby Park, St. Albert

4 September 2006	Ireland	11–24	United States	Ellerslie Rugby Park, Edmonton

=== Round three ===
8 September 2006	New Zealand	21–0	Scotland	Ellerslie Rugby Park, Edmonton

8 September 2006	Spain	14–12	Samoa	St. Albert Rugby Park, St. Albert

8 September 2006	Canada	45–5	Kazakhstan	Ellerslie Rugby Park, Edmonton

8 September 2006	England	27–8	France	St. Albert Rugby Park, St. Albert

8 September 2006	Australia	6–10	United States	Ellerslie Rugby Park, Edmonton

8 September 2006	Ireland	37–0	South Africa	St. Albert Rugby Park, St. Albert
	Try: Joy Neville (8'); Tania Rosser (19'); Fiona Coghlan (26'); Jeannette Feighery (39', 58'); Mairead Kelly (74'); Con: Grace Davitt (9'), Jo O'Sullivan (75'); Pen: Grace Davitt (2')	Report		Referee: Clare Daniels (England)

== Knock-out stages ==
=== 9th-12th place classification play-offs ===
Semi-finals
12 September - St. Albert
Samoa	43
South Africa	10
12 September - Edmonton (Ellerslie)
Spain	17
Kazakhstan	12

Final
16 September - Edmonton (Ellerslie)
Samoa	5
Spain	10
Third place
16 September - Edmonton (Ellerslie)
South Africa	0
Kazakhstan	36

==== Semi-finals ====
12 September 2006

Samoa	43–10	South Africa
	Report

St. Albert Rugby Park, St. Albert

12 September 2006

Spain	17–12	Kazakhstan

Ellerslie Rugby Park, Edmonton

==== 11th/12th place play-off ====
16 September 2006

Kazakhstan	36–0	South Africa
	Report

Ellerslie Rugby Park, Edmonton

==== 9th/10th place play-off ====
16 September 2006

Samoa	5–10	Spain

Ellerslie Rugby Park, Edmonton

=== 5th-8th classification play-offs ===
Semi-finals
12 September - St. Albert
Ireland	10
Scotland	11
12 September - St. Albert
United States	29
Australia	12

Final
16 September - Edmonton (Ellerslie)
Scotland	0
United States	24
Third place
16 September - Edmonton (Commonwealth)
Ireland	14
Australia	18

==== Semi-finals ====
12 September 2006

Ireland	10–11	Scotland

St. Albert Rugby Park, St. Albert

12 September 2006

United States	29–12	Australia

St. Albert Rugby Park, St. Albert

==== 7th/8th place play-off ====
16 September 2006

Ireland	14–18	Australia

Ellerslie Rugby Park, Edmonton

==== 5th/6th place play-off ====
17 September 2006

Scotland	0–24	United States

Commonwealth Stadium, Edmonton

=== Finals ===
Semi-finals
12 September - Edmonton (Ellerslie)
New Zealand	40
France	10
12 September - Edmonton (Ellerslie)
England	20
Canada	14

Final
17 September - Edmonton (Commonwealth)
New Zealand	25
England	17
Third place
17 September - Edmonton (Commonwealth)
France	17
Canada	8

==== Semi-finals ====
12 September 2006

New Zealand	40–10	France

Ellerslie Rugby Park, Edmonton

12 September 2006

Canada	14–20	England

Ellerslie Rugby Park, Edmonton

==== 3rd/4th place play-off ====
17 September 2006

Canada	8–17	France

Commonwealth Stadium, Edmonton

==== World Cup Final ====
17 September 2006

England	17–25	New Zealand

Commonwealth Stadium, Edmonton

2006 Women's Rugby World Cup winners

New Zealand
Third title

== Statistics ==
=== Teams ===
Points	Team	Matches	Tries	Conversions	Penalties	Drops	Yellow card	Red card
202	New Zealand	5	31	16	5	0	0	0
156	England	5	23	13	5	0	0	0
153	Canada	5	24	15	1	0	0	0
114	Australia	5	15	9	7	0	2	0
102	France	5	16	8	2	0	1	0
87	United States	5	14	7	1	0	2	0
80	Samoa	5	13	6	1	0	3	0
75	Kazakhstan	5	13	5	0	0	2	0
72	Ireland	5	11	4	3	0	1	0
67	Scotland	5	9	5	3	1	1	0
41	Spain	5	5	5	2	0	3	0
30	South Africa	5	5	1	1	0	3	0

=== Individual records ===
==== Top point scorers ====
Points	Name	Team	Position	Apps	Tries	Conv	Penalties	Drops
35	Heather Moyse	Canada	Fullback	5	7	0	0	0
34	Emma Jensen	New Zealand	Scrum-half	5	1	10	3	0
33	Valuese Sao Taliu	Samoa	Fullback	5	5	4	0	0
31	Shelley Rae	England	Fly-half	5	1	10	2	0
30	Sue Day	England	Centre/Wing	5	6	0	0	0
30	Maria Gallo	Canada	Centre/Wing	5	6	0	0	0
30	Amiria Marsh	New Zealand	Fullback	5	6	0	0	0
30	Tobie McGann	Australia	Fullback/Fly-half	5	2	4	4	0
29	Kelly McCallum	Canada	Fly-half	5	0	13	1	0
27	Paula Chalmers	Scotland	Scrum-half	5	1	5	3	1
25	Tricia Brown	Australia	Wing	5	5	0	0	0
25	Catherine Devillers	France	Wing	5	5	0	0	0
23	Pam Kosanke	United States	Centre	4	2	5	1	0
21	Estelle Sartini	France	Fly-half/Wing	5	2	4	1	0

==== Top try scorers ====
Tries	Name	Team	Position	Appearances
7	Heather Moyse	Canada	Fullback	5
6	Sue Day	England	Centre/Wing	5
6	Maria Gallo	Canada	Centre/Wing	5
6	Amiria Marsh	New Zealand	Fullback	5
5	Valuese Sao Taliu	Samoa	Fullback	5
5	Catherine Devillers	France	Wing	5
5	Tricia Brown	Australia	Wing	5
4	Ellie Karvoski	United States	Wing	5
4	Ruan Sims	Australia	Centre/Wing	5
3	Stephanie Mortimer	New Zealand	Wing	3
3	Claire Richardson	New Zealand	Wing	4
3	Isabel Rodríguez	Spain	Scrum-half	5
3	Jeannette Feighery	Ireland	Wing	5
3	Delphine Plantet	France	Number 8	5
3	Charlotte Barras	England	Wing	5
3	Rochelle Martin	New Zealand	Flanker	5
3	Melissa Ruscoe	New Zealand	Flanker	5

== Sources ==
- Rugby World Cup Women’s Stats Archive
- Women's Rugby Data
