= 1998 Women's Rugby World Cup squads =

1998 Rugby World Cup Squads
Tournament details
- Host nation: 1998 Rugby World Cup Squads
- Dates: 1 May – 16 May
- No. of nations: 16

This article lists the official squads for the 1998 Women's Rugby World Cup in the Netherlands.

== Pool A ==
=== England ===
Note: Flags indicate national union for the club/province as defined by World Rugby.

Player	Position	Date of birth (age)	Caps	Club/province
Susan Kathryn Appleby	Half-back	21 December 1970		(England) Saracens
Nicola Brown	??	20 November 1971		(England) Worcester
Gillian Ann Burns	??	12 July 1964		(England) Waterloo
Janice Jones	??	20 August 1963		(England)
Helen Clayton	Flanker	17 June 1971		(England) Saracens
Trudi Collins	??	1 May 1971		(England) Saracens
Susan Margaret Day	Wing	29 October 1972		(England) Wasps
Maxine Edwards	??	28 July 1966		(England) Saracens
Claire Frost	??	22 March 1973		(England) Saracens
Paula George (c)	??	20 October 1968		(England) Wasps (c)
Claire Green	??	23 July 1972		(England) Saracens
Katherine Knight	CE	18 December 1974		(England) Old Leamingtonians
Emma Mitchell	??	13 April 1966		(England) Saracens
Jayne Molyneux	??	21 October 1968		(England) Waterloo
Teresa Jane O'Reilly	??	16 September 1964		(England) Saracens
Nicola Jane Ponsford	??	6 October 1967		(England) Saracens
Joanna Poore	??	4 August 1972		(England) Richmond
Giselle Prangnell	??	19 April 1966		(England)
Sarah Robertson	??	21 January 1969		(England) Leeds
Janis Ross	??	7 June 1962		(England) Saracens
Terri Siwek	??	27 April 1966		(England) Richmond
Jennifer Watkinson	??	30 October 1972		(England)
Pip Atkinson	Wing	13 December 1964		(England) Clifton
Georgia Ruth Stevens	??	13 June 1973		(England) Clifton
Linda Uttley	??	26 October 1966		(England) Wasps
Joanne Yapp	Scrum-half	6 September 1979		(England) Worcester

=== Canada ===
Note: Flags indicate national union for the club/province as defined by World Rugby.

Player	Position	Date of birth (age)	Caps	Club/province
Kirsten Todd	??	24 June 1973		(Canada)
Gillian Florence	??	30 April 1975		(Canada)
Josée Lacasse	Prop	9 March 1970		(Canada)
Julie Hickie	??	7 April 1974		(Canada)
Lee Fairclough	??	2 June 1973		(Ontario) Ajax Wanderers
Terry Denike	??	18 August 1959		(Canada)
Joanne Gardner	??	18 April 1969		(Canada)
Maureen MacMahon	??	14 December 1970		(Canada) Toronto Scottish
Natascha Wesch	??	9 December 1970		(Canada)
Lynne Leclair (c)	??	12 January 1964		(Canada) (c)
Gina Minutillo	??	18 July 1963		(Ontario) Ajax Wanderners
Sherri Sparling	??	19 March 1969		(Canada)
Julie Foster	??	12 January 1969		(Canada)
Bethany Johnston	??	14 August 1968		(Canada)
Sue Asprey	??	27 July 1971		(Ontario) Ajax Wanderers
Judith Begin	??	12 August 1964		(Canada)
Janet Burrell	??	6 June 1961		(Canada)
Annette Darby	??	30 April 1969		(Canada)
Anne Marie Fleming	??	11 February 1971		(Canada) Ajax Wanderers
Sarah Hall	??	13 June 1973		(Ontario) Ajax Wanderers
Heather Hunt	Centre	16 October 1973	13	(Ontario) Toronto Scottish
Moira Shiels	??	13 September 1966		(Canada) Ajax Wanderers
Rhea Stocki	??	8 November 1975		(Canada)
Tara Trussell	??	9 October 1975		(Ontario) Ajax Wanderers
Christy Walsh	??	29 May 1971		(Canada)
Heather Wilson	??	29 January 1971		(Canada)

=== Netherlands ===
Note: Flags indicate national union for the club/province as defined by World Rugby.

Player	Position	Date of birth (age)	Caps	Club/province
Katinka Abbenbroek	Scrum-half	30 June 1970		(Netherlands)
Helma Born	??	11 July 1972		(Netherlands)
Hagar Cappers	Prop	21 June 1973		(Netherlands)
Susan Dammers	Flanker	23 February 1970		(Netherlands)
Odile De Bruijn	??	26 November 1968		(Netherlands)
Louise De Jong	??	26 April 1969		(Netherlands)
Minke Docter	??	9 September 1975		(Netherlands)
Ginny Hamilton	??	24 November 1971		(Netherlands)
Sabine Hoefsloot	??	15 September 1972		(Netherlands)
Tessa Kocken	??	28 September 1975		(Netherlands)
Claudia Meppelink	??	1 November 1966		(Netherlands)
Judith Morrien	??	20 February 1969		(Netherlands)
Mariette Schmutzer	??	25 February 1966		(Netherlands)
Beatrice Terostra	??	30 August 1965		(Netherlands)
Wieneke Tielen	??	4 September 1971		(Netherlands)
Simone Torremans	??	7 March 1963		(Netherlands)
Sacha Van Baar	??	15 June 1976		(Netherlands)
Yvonne Van Delft	??	21 August 1971		(Netherlands)
Marion Van Den Hoogen	??	5 May 1973		(Netherlands)
IIse Van Der Vorst	??	26 May 1972		(Netherlands)
Annemiek Van Elk	??	1 October 1967		(Netherlands)
Luise Van Luix	??	21 October 1964		(Netherlands)
Felicie Van Vree	??	8 February 1967		(Netherlands)
Ann-Mieke Van Waweren	??	9 November 1964		(Netherlands)
Margret Veldscholten	??	28 March 1967		(Netherlands)
Kitty Vloemans	??	17 July 1973		(Netherlands)

=== Sweden ===
Note: Flags indicate national union for the club/province as defined by World Rugby.

Player	Position	Date of birth (age)	Caps	Club/province
Ulrika Anderson-Hall	??	1 July 1973		(Sweden)
Hanna Bagenholm	??			(Sweden)
Hanna Bengtsson	??			(Sweden)
Sussanne Bengtsson	??			(Sweden)
Jennie Bohlin	??	29 July 1970		(Sweden)
Katarina Boman	??	12 December 1973		(Sweden)
Jane Hodson	??			(Sweden)
Asa Jarl	??			(Sweden)
Christina Johansson	??			(Sweden)
Patrice Birgitta Johansson	??	14 March 1968		(Sweden)
Joanna Kristrom	??			(Sweden)
Anna Maria Larsson	??			(Sweden)
Ylva Larsson	??			(Sweden)
Ingrid Leijonhufund	??			(Sweden)
Cecilia Ljungquist	??			(Sweden)
Karin Ljungquist	??			(Sweden)
Karin Mannerstedt	??			(Sweden)
Veronica Mentzer	??			(Sweden)
Sara Nordgren	??			(Sweden)
Annika Petterson	??			(Sweden)
Maria Robertsson	??			(Sweden)
Anna Frida Ryberg	??	14 July 1978		(Sweden)
Johanna Saveros	??			(Sweden)
Camilla Sawar	??			(Sweden)
Louise Vaerlin	??			(Sweden)
Emma Zingmark	??			(Sweden)

== Pool B ==
=== United States ===
Note: Flags indicate national union for the club/province as defined by World Rugby.

Player	Position	Date of birth (age)	Caps	Club/province
Shalanda Baker	Fullback	24 December 1976 (aged 21)	1	(United States) U.S. Air Force Academy
Jos Bergman	Fly-half	20 February 1969		(United States)
Barbara Bond	Number 8	9 August 1962		(United States)
Stacy Boyle	??	14 October 1974		(United States)
Carol Burdick	??			(United States)
Jennifer Crawford	Centre	25 July 1964		(United States)
Tammy Eckert	??			(United States)
Nancy Fitz	??			(United States)
Sheri Hunt	??			(United States)
Pamela Irby	??			(United States)
Patricia Marie Jervey	Centre	29 March 1964		(United States)
Michelle Johnson	??			(United States)
Kim Kaleiwahine	??			(United States)
Elizabeth Kirk	??			(United States)
Keirsten Lawton	??			(United States)
Krista McFarren	??			(United States)
Candice Maria Orsini	??			(United States)
Meredith Ottens	??			(United States)
Erina Queen	??			(United States)
Jennifer Renne	??			(United States)
Lisa Rowe	??			(United States)
Diane Schnapp	??			(United States)
May Sorensen	??			(United States)
Terese Taylor	??			(United States)
Tricia Turton	??			(United States)
Amy Westerman	??			(United States)
Alexandra Williams	??			(United States)

=== Spain ===
Note: Flags indicate national union for the club/province as defined by World Rugby.

Player	Position	Date of birth (age)	Caps	Club/province
Olatz Fernández de Arroyabe	Hooker	18 March 1970		(Spain)
Beatriz Muriel	Hooker	20 September 1976		(Spain)
Cristina López	Prop	20 February 1976		(Spain)
Olga Pons	Prop	25 August 1969		(Spain)
Cristina Valdés	Prop	19 April 1973		(Spain)
Nancy Rebecca Villarroya	Prop	15 February 1969		(Spain)
Elena Díez	Second row	10 February 1972		(Spain)
Marta Gran	Second row	25 November 1968		(Spain)
Lourdes López	Second row	30 October 1969		(Spain)
Pilar López	Second row	26 October 1971		(Spain)
Karitte Alegría	Back row	10 March 1971		(Spain)
Meritxell Basté	Back row	20 December 1970		(Spain)
Mercedes Batidor	Back row	21 July 1972		(Spain)
Teresa Fuster	Back row	28 October 1974		(Spain)
Rosa Calafat (c)	Scrum-half	28 May 1970		(Spain)
Inés Etxegibel	Scrum-half	7 January 1974		(Spain)
Paz Estevan	Fly-half	15 September 1970		(Spain)
Coral Vila	Fly-half	2 July 1972		(Spain)
Rocío Ramírez	Centre	3 November 1969		(Spain)
Rosanna Ros	Centre	28 April 1965		(Spain)
Raquel Socías	Centre	7 October 1975		(Spain)
Maria Isabel Pérez	Wing	13 December 1979		(Spain)
Otilia Roca	Wing	14 September 1968		(Spain)
Ariadna Selga	Wing	28 March 1974		(Spain)
Susana Monclús (vc)	Fullback	4 July 1967		(Spain)
Montserrat Poza	Fullback	17 August 1977		(Spain)

The following players are on reserve in case of withdrawals from the squad:

Note: Flags indicate national union for the club/province as defined by World Rugby.

Player	Position	Date of birth (age)	Caps	Club/province
Aroa González	Hooker	19 April 1979		(Spain)
Elena Saura	Second row	25 February 1973		(Spain)
Iraide Manzano	Back row	2 June 1966		(Spain)
Beltxa Villalobos	Centre	11 June 1973		(Spain)
Beatriz Jiménez	Wing	20 July 1970		(Spain)
Paloma Loza	Fullback	11 May 1965		(Spain)

=== Wales ===
Note: Flags indicate national union for the club/province as defined by World Rugby.

Player	Position	Date of birth (age)	Caps	Club/province
Antonia Antoniazzi	??	5 October 1971		(England) Waterloo
Geraldine Baylis	??	14 May 1968		(England) Saracens
Liza Jane Burgess	??	24 March 1964		(England) Saracens
Sue Calnan	??	20 May 1963		(England) Cheltenham
Tracey Comley	??	22 April 1974		(Wales) Ty-Croes
April Dent	??	28 February 1974		(England) Waterloo
Claire Donovan	??	13 September 1971		(England) Saracens
Sue Ellis	??	10 June 1962		(England) Richmond
Bess Evans	??	3 September 1966		(Wales) Cardiff Harlequins
Non Evans	??	20 June 1974		(Wales) Cardiff Harlequins
Philippa Evans	??	23 July 1968		(Wales) Swansea Uplands
Eleanor Green	??	23 June 1973		(England) Saracens
Nadine Griffiths	??	19 July 1974		(Wales) Cardiff Harlequins
Jamie Kifi	??	25 November 1978		(Wales) Cardiff Harlequins
Dawn Mason	??	22 April 1972		(England) Waterloo
Jacqueline Morgan	??	23 March 1964		(Wales) Cardiff Harlequins
Rhonwen Owens	??	12 December 1970		(Wales) Swansea Uplands
Sandra Phillips	??	4 May 1975		(Wales) Aberystwyth
Lisa Pritchard	??	3 October 1975		(Wales) Cardiff Harlequins
Louise Rickard	??	31 December 1970		(Wales) Aberystwyth
Julia Robinson	??	13 February 1975		(Wales) Aberystwyth
Emily Steer	??	2 July 1974		(Wales) Swansea Uplands
Jenna Studley	??	17 January 1979		(Wales) Blaenau Gwent
Sarah Thomas	??	20 July 1973		(England) Waterloo

=== Russia ===
Note: Flags indicate national union for the club/province as defined by World Rugby.

Player	Position	Date of birth (age)	Caps	Club/province
Larisa Aksyonova	??	26 July 1968		(Russia)
Oksana Aksyonova	??	5 April 1978		(Russia)
Maria Bakhtyzina	??	18 July 1981		(Russia)
Oksana Bogatch	??	24 April 1973		(Russia)
Anna Braznikova	??	29 January 1976		(Russia)
Yanina Erokhina	??	14 May 1977		(Russia)
Ira Fomina	??	16 September 1979		(Russia)
Galina Ghasovnikova	??	6 December 1970		(Russia)
Sveta Golovko	??	17 December 1968		(Russia)
Elena Kalinina	??	26 September 1975		(Russia)
Olga Kaplunova	??	2 July 1973		(Russia)
Anatoly Khodakovsky	??	29 June 1964		(Russia)
Sveta Krivoshapova	??	17 November 1966		(Russia)
Elena Lebedenko	??			(Russia)
Fyodor Levashoff	??			(Russia)
Sveta Moziarkina	??	1 November 1977		(Russia)
Natalia Puzina	??	13 September 1974		(Russia)
Ksenia Shchuckina	??	22 May 1976		(Russia)
Evgenia Solovyova	??	10 May 1970		(Russia)
Maria Tereschchenko	??	10 October 1970		(Russia)
Olga Trushkova	??	26 April 1973		(Russia)
Elena Vasilyeva	??			(Russia)
Elena Vasko	??	25 December 1979		(Russia)
Natalia Zagaderchuk	??	21 December 1975		(Russia)
Elena Zaikina	??	30 June 1969		(Russia)

== Pool C ==
=== New Zealand ===
Coach: Darryl Suasua

Note: Flags indicate national union for the club/province as defined by World Rugby.

Player	Position	Date of birth (age)	Caps	Club/province
Monalisa Codling	Lock	20 April 1977		(New Zealand)
Vanessa Cootes	Wing	26 July 1969		(New Zealand)
Maree Edwards	Scrum-half	8 February 1975		(New Zealand)
Janet Heenan	Flanker	29 July 1969		(New Zealand)
Monique Hirovanaa	Scrum-half	25 May 1966		(New Zealand)
Fiona King	Lock	1 February 1972		(New Zealand)
Kellie Kiwi	Scrum-half	31 January 1972		(New Zealand)
Dianne Kahura	Wing	1 May 1969		(New Zealand)
Toni Konui	Hooker	6 November 1966		(New Zealand)
Brigitta Lotu-Iiga	Flanker	9 February 1968		(New Zealand)
Rochelle Martin	Number 8	28 March 1975		(New Zealand)
Jacinta Nielsen	Flanker	30 May 1972		(New Zealand)
Farah Palmer	Hooker	27 November 1972		(New Zealand)
Anna Richards	Fly-half	3 December 1964		(New Zealand)
Fiona Richards	Lock	23 December 1970		(New Zealand)
Melodie Robinson	Flanker	25 May 1973		(New Zealand)
Annaleah Rush	Fullback	15 April 1976		(New Zealand)
Regina Sheck	Prop	9 November 1969		(New Zealand)
Exia Edwards	Wing	12 November 1975		(New Zealand)
Suzy Shortland	Centre	23 January 1974		(New Zealand)
Emma Thomas	Prop	6 November 1958		(New Zealand)
Cheryl Waaka	Loose forward	12 May 1970		(New Zealand)
Louisa Wall	Wing	17 February 1972		(New Zealand)
Tracey Waters	Prop	28 August 1973		(New Zealand)
Davida White	Flanker	26 March 1967		(New Zealand)
Tammy Wilson	Fullback	29 September 1973		(New Zealand)

=== Scotland ===
Note: Flags indicate national union for the club/province as defined by World Rugby.

Player	Position	Date of birth (age)	Caps	Club/province
Janyne Apseth	Flanker	3 November 1969		(Scotland) Edinburgh Academicals
Elizabeth Allsopp	Prop	24 March 1970		(Scotland) Edinburgh Wanderers
Louise Blamire	Scrum-half	20 December 1969		(Scotland) Edinburgh Academicals
Sue Brodie	Wing	6 December 1962		(Scotland) Edinburgh Academicals
Gill Cameron	Second row	22 February 1975		(Scotland) Edinburgh Wanderers
Michelle Cave	Fullback			(England) Saracens
Paula Chalmens	Scrum-half	8 June 1972		(Scotland) Edinburgh Wanderers
Alison Christie	Prop	1 December 1969		(England) Richmond
Lee Cockburn	Second row	17 May 1968		(Scotland) Edinburgh Academicals
Kim Craigie	Centre	28 December 1975		(Scotland) Edinburgh Wanderers
Denise Fairbairn	Wing	12 May 1972		(Scotland) Edinburgh Wanderers
Karen Ross Findlay	Prop	27 May 1968		(England) Richmond
Claire Herriot	Wing	14 October 1973		(Scotland) Edinburgh Academicals
Sarah Higgins	Fly-half	18 October 1972		(Scotland) Edinburgh Academicals
Donna Kennedy	Back row	16 February 1972		(Scotland) Edinburgh Wanderers
Rimma Lewis	Fly-half	30 September 1970		(Scotland) Edinburgh Wanderers
Kim Littlejohn (c)	Centre	22 November 1970		(England) Leeds
Ali Mackenzie	Hooker	22 February 1972		(Scotland) Glasgow Southern
Alison McGrandles	Fly-half	12 July 1972		(England) Leeds
Mags McHardy	Second row	10 April 1974		(Scotland) Edinburgh Academicals
Pogo Paterson	Centre	1 December 1969		(England) Richmond
Sheila Scott	Hooker	20 December 1967		(Scotland) Edinburgh Wanderers
Jennifer Sheerin	Flanker	21 May 1973		(England) Richmond
Julie Taylor	Prop	30 January 1970		(Scotland) Edinburgh Academicals
Irene Wilson	Flanker	30 January 1967		(England) Alton

=== Italy ===
Note: Flags indicate national union for the club/province as defined by World Rugby.

Player	Position	Date of birth (age)	Caps	Club/province
Paola Agostonelli	??	3 June 1977		(Italy)
Elena Bisetto	??	17 November 1969		(Italy)
Federica Bortolato	??	6 October 1966		(Italy)
Samantha Botter	??	6 August 1970		(Italy)
Marta Breda	??	25 May 1962		(Italy)
Giuliana Campanella	??	4 November 1976		(Italy)
Bruna Collodo	??	14 October 1962		(Italy)
Adelina Corbanese	??	28 March 1966		(Italy)
Patrizia Costa Pisani	??	13 December 1968		(Italy)
Lara Fabbri	??	8 April 1970		(Italy)
Daniela Gini	??	14 August 1977		(Italy)
Annonziata Longobardo	??	16 July 1976		(Italy)
Caterina Maschera	??	14 March 1973		(Italy)
Sabrina Melis	??	5 April 1970		(Italy)
Lorena Nave	??	5 December 1963		(Italy)
Carla Negri	??	10 November 1964		(Italy)
Chiara Peguiron	??	3 November 1977		(Italy)
Silvia Pizzati	??	7 November 1975		(Italy)
Anna Posceddo	??	2 October 1967		(Italy)
Enrica Quaglio	??	10 March 1972		(Italy)
Antonella Rossetti	??	30 June 1962		(Italy)
Adriana Sferragatta	??	19 February 1972		(Italy)
Licia Stefan	??	22 September 1976		(Italy)
Sedra Tartagni	??	22 August 1964		(Italy)
Michela Tondinello	??	15 January 1972		(Italy)
Maria Cristina Tonna	??	12 July 1969		(Italy)
Monica Zanetti	??	21 January 1980		(Italy)

=== Germany ===
Note: Flags indicate national union for the club/province as defined by World Rugby.

Player	Position	Date of birth (age)	Caps	Club/province
Doris Albers	??	30 April 1974		(Germany)
Renee Brendel-Konrad	??			(Germany)
Petra Drachenberg	??	30 April 1970		(Germany)
Barbara Frauenfeld	??	9 August 1970		(Germany)
Cornelia Golka	??	19 April 1963		(Germany)
Anja Henning	??	12 May 1969		(Germany)
Monika Hezinger	??	10 June 1974		(Germany)
Maren Hulverscheidt	??	27 October 1970		(Germany)
Petra Jordan-Bader	??	12 February 1970		(Germany)
Nicola Jorn	??	12 April 1970		(Germany)
Claudia Kleinert	??	7 July 1968		(Germany)
Andrea Kunkel	??	2 April 1969		(Germany)
Stefanie Lutge	??	6 June 1973		(Germany)
Nanette Mathes	??	25 April 1967		(Germany)
Susanne Meurer	??	11 June 1970		(Germany)
Franziska Ruter	??	21 February 1969		(Germany)
Antje Sanna	??	6 October 1966		(Germany)
Anke Schmette	??	22 April 1963		(Germany)
Susanne Schneider	??	5 May 1967		(Germany)
Olga Schneidewind	??	8 December 1973		(Germany)
Kerstin Uphoff	??	19 January 1974		(Germany)
Susanne Weidemann	??	21 December 1969		(Germany)
Petra Wenner	??	1 September 1969		(Germany)
Manuela Wiedemann	??	13 July 1971		(Germany)
Meike Zimmer	??	31 May 1976		(Germany)
Susanne Zubrod	??	24 August 1967		(Germany)

== Pool D ==
=== Australia ===
Note: Flags indicate national union for the club/province as defined by World Rugby.

Player	Position	Date of birth (age)	Caps	Club/province
Elizabeth Andrew	??	2 November 1971		(Australia)
Holly Birch	??	11 February 1972		(Australia)
Karen Bucholz	??	17 January 1964		(Australia)
Bronwyn Calvert	??	29 May 1969		(Australia)
Lisa-Jane Dwan	??	24 September 1969		(Australia)
Kerri Louise Ferris	??	9 January 1970		(Australia)
Mieke Fortune	??	4 January 1977		(Australia)
Bronwyn Hart	??	17 September 1973		(Australia)
Christine Henson	??	29 February 1964		(Australia)
Bronwyn Laidlaw (c)	??	27 December 1974		(Australia) (c)
Melissa Latu	??	31 July 1973		(Australia)
Perise Ili	??	7 November 1972		(Australia)
Bronwyn Mackintosh	??	24 June 1970		(Australia)
Ronnie May	??	21 October 1972		(Australia)
Sherilee Moulds	??	29 May 1972		(Australia)
Sharon O'Kane	??	27 September 1976		(Australia)
Tui Ormsby	??	20 January 1978		(Australia)
Tanya Osborne	??	2 April 1971		(Australia)
Pearl Palaiali'i	??	7 January 1970		(Australia)
Naomi Roberts	??	20 March 1970		(Australia)
Shirley Russell	??	31 December 1967		(Australia)
Helen Taylor	??	20 August 1964		(Australia)
Helen Theunissen	??	14 June 1966		(Australia)
Rebecca Wakim	??	5 August 1972		(Australia)
Nicole Wickert	??	13 September 1968		(Australia)
Selena Worsley	??	18 April 1975		(Australia)

=== France ===
Note: Flags indicate national union for the club/province as defined by World Rugby.

Player	Position	Date of birth (age)	Caps	Club/province
Anne Alaphilippe	??	28 December 1965		(France)
Nelly Barsacq	??	25 May 1979		(France)
Nathalie Bertrank	??	5 May 1968		(France)
Nathalie Bie	??	29 August 1969		(France)
Valerie Bouillon	??	7 August 1968		(France)
Sabine D'Andrea	??	5 February 1968		(France)
Aline Decayeux	??	2 September 1967		(France)
Carole Durand-Laurier	??	27 June 1966		(France)
Juliette Esclavard	??	27 October 1970		(France)
Anne Etien (c)	??	9 September 1967		(France) (c)
Laurence Gagliardini	??	30 May 1974		(France)
Annick Hayraud	??	9 September 1967		(France)
Danièle Irazu	??	12 December 1974		(France)
Pascale Laclau	??	31 January 1972		(France)
Elodie Lafitte	??	16 February 1975		(France)
Sonia Mas	??	13 April 1974		(France)
Elodie Celine Maybon	??	17 July 1977		(France)
Nathalie Paquet	??	31 October 1971		(France)
Magvenn Poupart	??	4 October 1970		(France)
Stéphanie Provost	Scrum-half	27 May 1973		(France)
Karine Quesada	??	10 November 1974		(France)
Chloe Rouanet	??	2 October 1973		(France)
Delphine Rousssel	??	6 June 1966		(France)
Odile Autret-Sorel	??	6 May 1973		(France)

=== Ireland ===
Note: Flags indicate national union for the club/province as defined by World Rugby.

Player	Position	Date of birth (age)	Caps	Club/province
Olivia Brown	??	14 December 1977		(Republic of Ireland)
Ruth Burn	??	24 March 1972		(Republic of Ireland)
Carole Byrne	??	27 December 1969		(Republic of Ireland)
Deborah Campbell	??	5 October 1974		(Republic of Ireland)
Niamh Collins	??	1 February 1971		(Republic of Ireland)
Sinead Cosgrave	??	29 March 1968		(Republic of Ireland)
Maura Coulter	??	18 January 1970		(Republic of Ireland)
Rachel Currie	??	14 April 1974		(Republic of Ireland)
Fiona Devaney	??	14 April 1976		(Republic of Ireland)
Aisling Dillon	??	10 April 1968		(Republic of Ireland)
Karen Eagleson	??	13 September 1974		(Republic of Ireland)
Cath Evans	??	27 April 1965		(Republic of Ireland)
Joss Hanrahan	??	28 March 1973		(Republic of Ireland)
Katheryn Hennessy	??	21 December 1963		(Republic of Ireland)
Jacqui Horan	??	15 May 1975		(Republic of Ireland)
Theresa Kennedy	??	14 February 1969		(Republic of Ireland)
Marie Kerrin	??	6 August 1969		(Republic of Ireland)
Marie Myles	??	28 November 1966		(Republic of Ireland)
Melanie Nash	??	16 April 1965		(Republic of Ireland)
Fiona Neary	??	18 September 1977		(Republic of Ireland)
Laura Nicholl	??	27 November 1979		(Republic of Ireland)
Diane Nixon	??	19 October 1972		(Republic of Ireland)
Lorraine Noade	??	8 June 1967		(Republic of Ireland)
Jackie O'Brian	??	29 September 1961		(Republic of Ireland)
Ciara O'Connell	??	15 June 1973		(Republic of Ireland)
Jean O'Gorman	??	21 February 1975		(Republic of Ireland)
Annie Parsons	??	27 October 1965		(Republic of Ireland)
Sue Ramsbottom	??	11 July 1973		(Republic of Ireland) Galwegians
Caroline Reid	??	7 August 1978		(Republic of Ireland)
Rachel Reid	??	23 January 1972		(Republic of Ireland)
Realtine Shrieves	??	16 March 1967		(Republic of Ireland)
Helen Siwek	??	27 January 1963		(Republic of Ireland)
Fiona Steed	??	28 April 1972		(Republic of Ireland)
Joan Whiteside	??	21 May 1969		(Republic of Ireland)
Elaine Witt	??	24 May 1970		(Republic of Ireland)

=== Kazakhstan ===
Note: Flags indicate national union for the club/province as defined by World Rugby.

Player	Position	Date of birth (age)	Caps	Club/province
Rimma Aivpova	??	26 October 1964		(Kazakhstan)
Tatyana Ashikhmina	??	11 August 1974		(Kazakhstan)
Natalya Baibaytrova	??	19 September 1973		(Kazakhstan)
Irina Chernenko	??	9 November 1978		(Kazakhstan)
Olga Chukreeva	??	24 November 1975		(Kazakhstan)
Larissa Chuprikova	??	22 October 1978		(Kazakhstan)
Yelena Dadasheva	??	11 April 1970		(Kazakhstan)
Akkumys Duzelbayeva	??	5 September 1973		(Kazakhstan)
Larisa Kalinichenko	??	12 December 1956		(Kazakhstan)
Svetlana Khokhlova	??	24 February 1971		(Kazakhstan)
Nataliya Kiseleva	??	20 May 1973		(Kazakhstan)
Lyubov Klepikova	??	28 January 1975		(Kazakhstan)
Nataliya Kovalevskya	??	12 January 1970		(Kazakhstan)
Olga Kumanikina	??	14 August 1974		(Kazakhstan)
Elena Milovanova	??	6 November 1978		(Kazakhstan)
Ulzhan Mussabayeva	??	25 November 1966		(Kazakhstan)
Alfiya Mustafina	??	14 May 1969		(Kazakhstan)
Anna Nedospassova	??	11 January 1976		(Kazakhstan)
Valentina Nezbudey	??	30 January 1970		(Kazakhstan)
Elena Nicolaenko	??	30 March 1973		(Kazakhstan)
Elena Onischenko	??	24 March 1966		(Kazakhstan)
Irina Pupkova	??	24 February 1971		(Kazakhstan)
Olga Rudoy	??	7 January 1963		(Kazakhstan)
Nataliya Shatskikh	??	10 May 1978		(Kazakhstan)
Luymila Shitenko	??	19 November 1977		(Kazakhstan)
Alfiya Tamaeva	??	9 October 1975		(Kazakhstan)
Svetlana Karatygina	??	11 May 1974		(Kazakhstan)
