= List of New Zealand women's national rugby union team player records =

The New Zealand women's national rugby union team have officially competed since 1991, this is a list of individual records achieved since then. The team is also known as the Black Ferns, and have competed in Test rugby since their first officially recognised match against Canada at the 1991 Women's Rugby World Cup in Wales. The Black Ferns record for Test appearances is held by Kendra Cocksedge, who played 68 Test matches for the team between 2007 and 2022. She also holds the record for most Test points with 388. Maia Roos captained the Black Ferns for their final Pacific Four match against the United States in 2023 and became the youngest-ever to captain the side, which was previously held by Farah Palmer by three years.

In 2025, Portia Woodman-Wickliffe scored her 50th try and now holds the record for the most test tries in New Zealand rugby's history, men’s or women’s.

== Most caps ==
#	Player	Position	Span	Tests	Won	Draw	Lost	Win %
1	Kendra Cocksedge	Scrum-half	2007–2022	68	54	1	14	79.41%
2	**Ruahei Demant**	Fly-half	2018–present	59	47	1	13	79.66%
3	Fiao'o Fa'amausili	Hooker	2002–2018	57	49	0	8	85.96%
4	Emma Jensen	Half-back	2002–2015	49	41	1	7	83.67%
4	Anna Richards	First five-eighth	1990–2010	49	47	0	2	95.92%
4	**Maiakawanakaulani Roos**	Lock	2021-present	49	37	1	11	75.51%
5	**Georgia Ponsonby**	Hooker	2021-present	48	38	1	9	79.17%
6	Eloise Blackwell	Lock	2011–2021	46	33	1	12	71.74%
6	Renee Wickliffe	Wing	2009–2022	46	36	1	9	78.26%
6	**Liana Mikaele-Tu'u**	Flanker	2021-present	46	34	0	12	73.91%
7	Kelly Brazier	Utility back	2009–present	44	31	1	12	70.45%
8	Selica Winiata	Fullback	2008–2019	40	33	0	7	82.5%
8	**Sylvia Brunt**	Centre	2022-present	40	32	1	7	80%
9	**Ayesha Leti-I'iga**	Wing	2018-present	39	29	1	9	74.36%
10	Linda Itunu	Number 8	2003–2018	38	34	0	4	89.47%
10	Aleisha-Pearl Nelson	Prop	2012–2021	38	28	0	10	73.68%
10	Casey Robertson	Prop	2002–2014	38	30	1	7	78.95%

Current as of France vs New Zealand, 31 October 2026. Statistics include officially capped matches only. Current Black Ferns are indicated in bold.

== Most tries ==
#	Player	Position	Career span	Tests	Points	Tries	Tries/tests
1	**Portia Woodman**	Wing	2013–present	34	250	50	1.47
2	Vanessa Cootes	Wing	1995–2002	16	215	43	2.69
3	Selica Winiata	Fullback	2008–2019	40	195	39	0.98
4	Anna Richards	Fly-half	1990–2010	49	140	29	0.59
5	**Ayesha Leti-I'iga**	Wing	2018–present	39	145	27	0.73
6	**Katelyn Vaha'akolo**	Wing	2023–present	20	125	25	1.25
7	**Mererangi Paul**	Wing	2023-present	24	115	23	0.96
8	Renee Wickliffe	Wing	2009–2022	46	120	24	0.52
9	Tammi Wilson	Fullback	1998–2002	16	193	21	1.31
10	**Braxton Sorensen-McGee**	Fullback	2025-present	17	185	19	1.12
10	Louisa Wall	Wing	1994–1999	15	95	19	1.27
10	Carla Hohepa	Wing	2007–2021	28	95	19	0.68
10	Kendra Cocksedge	Scrum-half	2007–2022	68	388	19	0.28
10	Dianne Kahura	Wing	1998–2002	12	95	19	1.58

Current as of France vs New Zealand, 31 October 2026. Statistics include officially capped matches only. Current Black Ferns are indicated in bold.

== Most points ==
#	Player	Career span	Points	Tests	Tries	Conv	Pens	Drop	Avg
1	Kendra Cocksedge	2007–2022	388	68	19	102	33	0	5.71
2	**Renee Holmes**	2021–present	255	32	11	88	8	0	7.97
3	**Portia Woodman**	2013–present	250	34	50	0	0	0	7.35
4	Vanessa Cootes	1995–2002	215	16	43	0	0	0	13.44
5	Selica Winiata	2008–2020	195	40	39	0	0	0	4.88
5	Kelly Brazier	2009–2021	195	44	12	45	15	0	4.43
6	Tammi Wilson	1998–2002	193	16	21	29	11	0	12.06
7	**Braxton Sorensen-McGee**	2025–present	185	17	19	46	0	0	10.88
8	Hannah Porter	2000–2008	166	22	5	42	20	0	7.55
9	Annaleah Rush	1996–2002	152	20	14	32	6	0	7.6
10	**Ruahei Demant**	2018-present	148	61	14	33	4	0	2.43
11	Anna Richards	1990–2010	140	49	29	0	0	0	2.86

Current as of France vs New Zealand, 31 October 2026. Statistics include officially capped matches only. Current Black Ferns are indicated in bold.

== Most points in a match ==
#	Player	Position	Points	Tries	Conv	Pens	Drop	Result	Opposition	Date
1	Vanessa Cootes	Wing	45	9	0	0	0	109–0	France	1996
2	**Portia Woodman**	Wing	40	8	0	0	0	121–0	Hong Kong	2017
3	Tammi Wilson	Fullback	36	6	4	0	0	65–5	United States	1999
4	**Portia Woodman**	Wing	35	7	0	0	0	79-14	United States	2025
5	Christine Ross	Fullback	34	2	12	0	0	109–0	France	1996
6	Kendra Cocksedge	Scrum-half	31	1	13	0	0	121–0	Hong Kong	2017
7	Selica Winiata	Fullback	25	5	0	0	0	90–12	Samoa	2014
8	Annaleah Rush	Centre	24	2	4	2	0	44–11	England	1998
9	**Braxton Sorensen-McGee**	Wing	23	3	4	0	0	62–19	Japan	2025
9	**Renee Holmes**	Fullback	23	2	5	1	0	48-15	United States	2026
10	**Renee Holmes**	Fullback	22	2	6	0	0	57–0	Scotland	2022
11	Heidi Reader	Fullback	21	1	8	0	0	86–8	United States	1996
11	**Braxton Sorensen-McGee**	Fullback	21	1	8	0	0	66–19	Australia	2026
12	Louisa Wall	Wing	20	4	0	0	0	88–3	Canada	1996
12	Dianne Kahura	Wing	20	4	0	0	0	134–6	Germany	1998
12	Exia Shelford	Centre	20	4	0	0	0	73–0	Canada	1999
12	Kelly Brazier	Fly-half	20	2	5	0	0	79–5	Kazakhstan	2014
12	Honey Hireme	Wing	20	4	0	0	0	55–5	United States	2014
12	**Ruby Tui**	Wing	20	4	0	0	0	70–7	Wales	2023
12	**Katelyn Vaha'akolo**	Wing	20	4	0	0	0	62–0	Australia	2024
12	**Braxton Sorensen-McGee**	Fullback	20	2	5	0	0	52–20	South Africa	2026
12	**Shyrah Tuliau-Tua'a**	Wing	20	4	0	0	0	81–12	France	2026

Current as of France vs New Zealand, 31 October 2026. Statistics include officially capped matches only. Current Black Ferns are indicated in bold.

== Most tries in a match ==
#	Player	Position	Tries	Result	Opposition	Date
1	Vanessa Cootes	Wing	9	109–0	France	1996
2	**Portia Woodman**	Wing	8	121–0	Hong Kong	2017
3	**Portia Woodman**	Wing	7	79-14	United States	2025
4	Tammi Wilson	Fullback	6	65–5	United States	1999
5	Selica Winiata	Fullback	5	90–12	Samoa	2014
6	Dianne Kahura	Wing	4	134–6	Germany	1998
6	Exia Shelford	Centre	4	73–0	Canada	1999
6	Louisa Wall	Wing	4	88–3	Canada	1996
6	Honey Hireme	Wing	4	55–5	United States	2014
6	**Ruby Tui**	Wing	4	70–7	Wales	2023
6	**Katelyn Vaha'akolo**	Wing	4	62–0	Australia	2024
6	**Shyrah Tuliau-Tua'a**	Wing	4	81–12	France	2026
11	13 players have scored hat-tricks (3 tries).					

Current as of France vs New Zealand, 31 October 2026. Statistics include officially capped matches only. Current Black Ferns are indicated in bold.

== Most matches as captain ==
#	Player	Span	Caps	Won	Draw	Loss	Total caps	Win % (as captain)
1	**Ruahei Demant**	2018–present	41	34	1	6	59	82.93%
2	Fiao'o Fa'amausili	2002–2018	33	27	0	6	58	81.82%
3	Farah Palmer	1996–2006	30	29	0	1	35	96.67%
4	**Kennedy Tukuafu**	2019–present	19	11	1	7	34	57.89%
5	Les Elder	2015–2021	9	5	0	4	22	55.56%
6	Melissa Ruscoe	2004–2010	8	8	0	0	22	100%
7	Lenadeen Simpson	1994–1997	7	7	0	0	8	100%
7	**Georgia Ponsonby**	2021-present	7	6	0	1	48	85.71%
9	Helen Littleworth	1991–1996	3	2	0	1	8	66.67%
9	Victoria Blackledge	2006–2013	3	1	1	1	17	33.33%
9	**Alana Bremner**	2021–present	3	3	0	0	35	100%
11	Rochelle Martin	1994–2006	2	2	0	0	32	100%
11	Victoria Heighway	2000–2010	2	1	0	1	32	50%

Current as of France vs New Zealand, 27 September 2025. Statistics include officially capped matches only. Current Black Ferns are indicated in bold.

== Youngest players ==
#	Player	Age	DOB	Debut	Opposition
1	Amiria Marsh	17 years, 129 days	17 May 1983	23 September 2000	Canada
2	Onjeurlina Leiataua	17 years, 231 days	1 December 1995	20 July 2013	England
3	Olivia Coady	18 years, 66 days	9 August 1990	14 October 2008	Australia
4	**Sylvia Brunt**	18 years, 162 days	1 January 2004	12 June 2022	Canada
5	Amy Williams	18 years, 196 days	15 December 1986	29 June 2005	Scotland
6	**Braxton Sorensen-McGee**	18 years, 197 days	26 October 2006	10 May 2025	Australia
7	Fa'anati Aniseko	18 years, 199 days	31 March 1989	16 October 2007	Australia
8	Patricia Maliepo	18 years, 232 days	13 March 2003	31 October 2021	England
9	Kiritapu Demant	18 years, 262 days	8 October 1996	27 June 2015	Canada
10	Linda Itunu	18 years, 317 days	21 November 1984	4 October 2003	World XV

Current as of France vs New Zealand, 27 September 2025. Statistics include officially capped matches only. Current Black Ferns are indicated in bold.

== Oldest players ==
#	Player	Age	DOB	Last match	Opposition
1	Anna Richards	45 years, 306 days	3 December 1964	5 October 2010	England
2	Emma Thomas	39 years, 296 days	6 November 1958	29 August 1998	Australia
3	Fiao'o Fa'amausili	38 years, 48 days	30 September 1980	17 November 2018	France
4	Tia Paasi	38 years, 21 days	29 September 1969	20 October 2007	Australia
5	Emma Jensen	37 years, 222 days	25 November 1977	5 July 2015	United States
6	Melodie Ngatai	37 years, 24 days	26 June 1976	20 July 2013	England
7	Vicky Cunningham	36 years, 198 days	30 January 1961	16 August 1997	Australia
8	Carla Hohepa	36 years, 116 days	27 July 1985	20 November 2021	France
9	Honey Hireme	36 years, 45 days	3 May 1981	17 June 2017	England
10	Monique Hirovanaa	36 years, 0 days	25 May 1966	25 May 2002	England

Current as of France vs New Zealand, 27 September 2025. Statistics include officially capped matches only. Current Black Ferns are indicated in bold.
