= 2002 Women's Rugby World Cup final =

2002 Women's Rugby World Cup Final
- Event: 2002 Women's Rugby World Cup
New Zealand	England
(New Zealand)	(England)
19	9
- Date: 25 May 2002
- Venue: Olympic Stadium, Barcelona
- Referee: Giulio De Santis (Italy)
- Attendance: 8,000

The 2002 Women's Rugby World Cup Final was a rugby union match that determined the winner of the 2002 Women's Rugby World Cup. The event occurred on 25 May 2002 at the Olympic Stadium in Barcelona, the match was between New Zealand and England. New Zealand were crowned champions for a second time after beating England 19–9.

== Route to the final ==
New Zealand
Round
England
Opponent
Result
Pool stage
Opponent
Result
Germany
117–0
Match 1
Italy
63–9
Australia
36–3
Match 2
Spain
13–5

Position	Nation	P	W	D	L	PF	PA	TP	Overall ranking
1	New Zealand	2	2	0	0	153	3	6	1st
2	Australia	2	1	0	1	33	36	4	8th
3	Wales	2	1	0	1	77	30	4	9th
4	Germany	2	0	0	2	0	194	2	16th

Final standing

Position	Nation	P	W	D	L	PF	PA	TP	Overall ranking
1	England	2	2	0	0	76	14	6	3rd
2	Spain	2	1	0	1	67	13	4	6th
3	Italy	2	1	0	1	39	66	4	12th
4	Japan	2	0	0	2	3	92	2	15th

Opponent
Result
Knockout stage
Opponent
Result
France
30–0
Semi-finals
Canada
53–10

The Black Ferns were pooled in Pool A with Australia, Wales and for a second time, Germany. England had Spain, Italy and Japan in their pool, which was Pool C.

New Zealand ran in a staggering 19 unanswered tries against Germany. Their wingers contributed the most points, Vanessa Cootes scored 25 points with five tries and Dianne Kahura scored 20 points with four tries. Fullback Tammi Wilson scored two tries and converted four goals, while centre Hannah Myers made 14 points from seven conversions. Eight other try scorers crossed the try line giving the Black Ferns a 117–0 win over Germany. New Zealand played their last pool game against Australia. The match was locked at nil all at halftime but New Zealand eventually won 36–3 at fulltime. They met France in the semifinal and defeated them 30–0 despite receiving two yellow cards.

England thrashed Italy 63–9 in their first pool game and then narrowly beat Spain 13–5. The second semifinal saw England defeat Canada 53–10, which ensured a final between them and New Zealand.

== Match ==
25 May 2002

New Zealand	19–9	England
Try: Hirovanaa; Waaka; Pen: Wilson (2); Myers		Pen: Rae (2); Drop: Rae

Olympic Stadium, Barcelona
Attendance: 8,000

=== Summary ===
England's points came from the boot of their flyhalf Shelley Rae who kicked in two penalties and a drop goal all in the first half. New Zealand's Tammi Wilson kicked two penalties and Monique Hirovanaa scored a try to give them an 11–9 lead at halftime. New Zealand Lock Victoria Heighway was sin-binned in the second half but the English were unable to capitalize on it. England were kept in their half for most of the second half. Loose forward Cheryl Waaka scored New Zealand's last try that put them 16–9 before a final penalty goal from Hannah Myers sealed the game at 19–9 at fulltime. New Zealand won their second World Cup title.
