= New Zealand women at the Rugby World Cup =

Sporting event results

The New Zealand women's national rugby union team, also known as the Black Ferns, have played 38 matches so far in eight of nine Women's Rugby World Cup tournaments in 1991, and from 1998 to 2021. They did not participate in the 1994 World Cup in Scotland due to a late cancellation.

They have won the 1998, 2002, 2006, 2010, 2017, and the 2021 tournaments. They are the only team to have won four back-to-back World Cup's — 1998 to 2010. Their worst performance was in 2014 when they lost their only match in the pool stage to Ireland and missed out on the semi-finals for the first time. They have made it to at least the semi-finals at all the other tournaments.

New Zealand hosted their first Women's Rugby World Cup which washeld from 8 October to 12 November 2022 in Auckland and Whangārei. The tournament was originally scheduled to be held in 2021, but was postponed due to the COVID-19 pandemic. It was the first time that a country in the Southern Hemisphere has ever hosted a Rugby World Cup. The Black Ferns won their sixth title after defeating England in the final.

== By position ==
Rugby World Cup
Year	Round	Pld	W	D	L	PF	PA	Squad
(Wales) 1991	Third place*	3	2	0	1	48	21	Squad
(Scotland) 1994	Did not participate due to late tournament cancellation							
(Netherlands) 1998	Champions†	5	5	0	0	344	32	Squad
(Spain) 2002	Champions†	4	4	0	0	202	12	Squad
(Canada) 2006	Champions†	5	5	0	0	202	34	Squad
(England) 2010	Champions†	5	5	0	0	186	33	Squad
(France) 2014	Fifth place	5	4	0	1	245	37	Squad
(Ireland) 2017	Champions†	5	5	0	0	299	61	Squad
(New Zealand) 2021	Champions†	6	6	0	0	268	87	Squad
(England) 2025	Third place	6	5	0	1	263	104	Squad
(Australia) 2029	Qualified as 2025 Women's Rugby World Cup semi-finalists							
(United States) 2033	TBD							
Total	Champions^{†}	44	41	0	3	2,057	421	Squad
Champion Runner-up Third place Fourth place: * Tied placing ^{†} Best placing / Home venue

== 1991 Rugby World Cup ==
=== Pool Stage ===
Team	Won	Drawn	Lost	For	Against
New Zealand	2	0	0	48	14
Canada	0	1	1	17	33
Wales	0	1	1	15	33

6 April 1991

New Zealand	24–8	Canada

Glamorgan Wanderers

10 April 1991

New Zealand	24–6	Wales

Llanharan

=== Cup Semi-final ===
12 April 1991

New Zealand	0–7	United States

Cardiff Arms Park

== 1998 Rugby World Cup ==
=== Pool Stage ===
Team	Won	Drawn	Lost	For	Against	Ladder
New Zealand	2	0	0	210	6	1st
Scotland	1	0	1	37	84	7th
Italy	1	0	1	42	42	11th
Germany	0	0	2	11	168	15th

2 May 1998

New Zealand	134–6	Germany

Amsterdam

5 May 1998

New Zealand	76–0	Scotland

Amsterdam

=== Knockout stage ===
Quarter-final

9 May 1998

New Zealand	46–3	Spain

Amsterdam

Semi-final

12 May 1998

New Zealand	44–11	England

Amsterdam

Final

16 May 1998

New Zealand	44–12	United States

Amsterdam

== 2002 Rugby World Cup ==
=== Pool Stage ===
Position	Nation	Games				Points		Table points	Overall ranking
Position	Nation	played	won	drawn	lost	for	against	Table points	Overall ranking
1	New Zealand	2	2	0	0	153	3	6	1st
2	Australia	2	1	0	1	33	36	4	8th
3	Wales	2	1	0	1	77	30	4	9th
4	Germany	2	0	0	2	0	194	2	16th

13 May 2002

New Zealand	117–0	Germany

Cornellà de Llobregat, Barcelona

18 May 2002

New Zealand	36–3	Australia

Cornellà de Llobregat, Barcelona

=== Knockout stage ===
Semi-final

21 May 2002

New Zealand	30–0	France

Cornellà de Llobregat, Barcelona

Final

25 May 2002

New Zealand	19–9	England

Olympic Stadium, Barcelona

== 2006 Rugby World Cup ==
=== Pool Stage ===
Pool A ⇔ Pool D
Pool	Team	Won	Drawn	Lost	For	Against	Points
A	New Zealand	3	0	0	137	7	14
D	Canada	2	0	1	131	71	10
D	Scotland	2	0	1	56	38	10
D	Samoa	1	0	2	32	69	5
A	Spain	1	0	2	14	115	4
A	Kazakhstan	0	0	3	22	97	0

31 August 2006

New Zealand	66–7	Canada

Ellerslie Rugby Park, Edmonton

4 September 2006

New Zealand	50–0	Samoa

St. Albert Rugby Park, St. Albert

8 September 2006

New Zealand	21–0	Scotland

Ellerslie Rugby Park, Edmonton

=== Knockout stage ===
Semi-final

12 September 2006

New Zealand	40–10	France

Ellerslie Rugby Park, Edmonton

Final

17 September 2006

New Zealand	25–17	England

Commonwealth Stadium, Edmonton

== 2010 Rugby World Cup ==
=== Pool Stage ===
Po	Nation	Pl	Wo	Dr	Lo	Pf	Pa	Pd	Tf	Ta	Bp	Tp
1	New Zealand	3	3	0	0	128	16	+112	22	2	3	15
2	Australia	3	2	0	1	93	44	+49	14	8	2	10
3	South Africa	3	1	0	2	18	127	−109	3	19	0	4
4	Wales	3	0	0	3	30	82	−52	4	14	1	1

20 August 2010

New Zealand	55–3	South Africa

Surrey Sports Park, Guildford, S.E. England
Referee: Andrew McMenemy (Scotland)

24 August 2010

New Zealand	32–5	Australia

Surrey Sports Park
Referee: Dana Teagarden (USA)

28 August 2010

New Zealand	41–8	Wales

Surrey Sports Park
Referee: Clare Daniels (England)

=== Knockout stage ===
Semi-final

1 September 2010

New Zealand	45–7	France

Twickenham Stoop
Referee: Claire Daniels (England)

Final

5 September 2010

New Zealand	13–10	England

Twickenham Stoop
Referee: Sarah Corrigan (Australia)

== 2014 Rugby World Cup ==
=== Pool Stage ===
Team	Pld	W	D	L	TF	PF	PA	+/−	BP	Pts
Ireland	3	3	0	0	10	80	36	+44	1	13
New Zealand	3	2	0	1	20	127	25	+102	3	11
United States	3	1	0	2	10	67	64	+3	2	6
Kazakhstan	3	0	0	3	2	17	166	−149	0	0

1 August 2014

New Zealand	79–5	Kazakhstan

CNR, Marcoussis Pitch 2
Referee: (England) Claire Hodnett

5 August 2014

New Zealand	14–17	Ireland

CNR, Marcoussis Pitch 1
Referee: (United States) Leah Berard

9 August 2014

New Zealand	34–3	United States

CNR, Marcoussis Pitch 1
Referee: (Canada) Sherry Turnbull

=== Knockout stage ===
5th–8th Place Playoff (Semi-final)

13 August 2014
15:45

New Zealand	63–7	Wales

Stade Jean-Bouin, Paris, France
Referee: (England) Claire Hodnett

5th Place Playoff

17 August 2014
14:15

New Zealand	55–5	United States

Stade Jean-Bouin, Paris, France
Referee: (Ireland) Helen O'Reilly

== 2017 Rugby World Cup ==
=== Pool Stage ===
Team	Pld	W	D	L	TF	PF	PA	+/−	BP	Pts
New Zealand	3	3	0	0	35	213	17	+196	3	15
Canada	3	2	0	1	19	118	48	+70	1	9
Wales	3	1	0	2	9	51	74	−23	1	5
Hong Kong	3	0	0	3	2	15	258	−243	0	0

9 August 2017

New Zealand	44–12	Wales

Billings Park UCD, Dublin

13 August 2017

New Zealand	121–0	Hong Kong

Billings Park UCD, Dublin

17 August 2017

New Zealand	48–5	Canada

Billings Park UCD, Dublin

=== Knockout stage ===
Semi-final

22 August 2017

New Zealand	45–12	United States

Kingspan Stadium, Belfast

Final

26 August 2017

New Zealand	41–32	England

Kingspan Stadium, Belfast
Referee: Joy Neville

== 2021 Rugby World Cup ==
=== Pool Stage ===
Pos	Team	Pld	W	D	L	PF	PA	PD	T	B	Pts
1	New Zealand	3	3	0	0	154	29	+125	26	3	15
2	Australia	3	2	0	1	44	60	−16	6	0	8
3	Wales	3	1	0	2	37	84	−47	5	1	5
4	Scotland	3	0	0	3	27	89	−62	5	2	2

8 October 2022

New Zealand	41–17	Australia

Eden Park, Auckland

16 October 2022

New Zealand	56–12	Wales

Waitakere Stadium, Auckland

22 October 2022

New Zealand	57–0	Scotland

Northland Events Centre, Whangārei

=== Knockout stage ===
Quarter-final

29 October 2022

New Zealand	55–3	Wales

Northland Events Centre, Whangārei
Referee: Aimee Barrett-Theron (South Africa)

Semi-final

5 November 2022

New Zealand	25–24	France

Eden Park, Auckland

=== Final ===
12 November 2022

New Zealand	34–31	England

Eden Park, Auckland
Referee: Hollie Davidson (Scotland)

== 2025 Rugby World Cup ==
=== Pool Stage ===
Pos	Team	Pld	W	D	L	PF	PA	PD	TF	TA	TB	LB	Pts	
1	New Zealand	3	3	0	0	156	27	+129	24	4	3	0	15	Advance to knockout stage
2	Ireland	3	2	0	1	85	81	+4	13	13	2	0	10	Advance to knockout stage
3	Japan	3	1	0	2	62	125	−63	10	19	1	0	5	
4	Spain	3	0	0	3	56	126	−70	9	20	1	0	1	

Source: World Rugby

24 August 2025

(1 BP) New Zealand	54–8	Spain

York Community Stadium, York

31 August 2025

(1 BP) New Zealand	62–19	Japan

Sandy Park, Exeter

7 September 2025

(1 BP) New Zealand	40–0	Ireland

Brighton & Hove Albion Stadium, Brighton

=== Knockout stage ===
Quarter-final

13 September 2025

New Zealand	46–17	South Africa

Sandy Park, Exeter

Semi-final

19 September 2025

New Zealand	19–34	Canada

Ashton Gate, Bristol

=== Bronze final ===
27 September 2025

New Zealand	42–26	France

Twickenham Stadium, London

== Overall record ==
Overall record against all nations in the World Cup:

Country	P	W	D	L	PF	PA	+/-	Win %
Australia	3	3	0	0	109	25	+84	100%
Canada	4	3	0	1	157	54	+103	75%
England	6	6	0	0	176	110	+66	100%
France	5	5	0	0	182	67	+99	100%
Germany	2	2	0	0	251	6	+245	100%
Hong Kong	1	1	0	0	121	0	+120	100%
Ireland	2	1	0	1	54	17	+37	50%
Japan	1	1	0	0	62	19	+43	100%
Kazakhstan	1	1	0	0	79	5	+74	100%
Samoa	1	1	0	0	50	0	+50	100%
Scotland	3	3	0	0	154	0	+154	100%
South Africa	2	2	0	0	101	20	+52	100%
Spain	2	2	0	0	100	11	+89	100%
United States	5	4	0	1	178	39	+139	80%
Wales	6	6	0	0	283	48	+235	100%
Total	44	41	0	3	2,057	421	+1,636	93.18%
