= List of Women's Rugby World Cup finals =

- Sport: Rugby union
- Instituted: 1991
- Number of teams: 12-16
- Country: International (World Rugby)
- Holders: England (2025)
- Most titles: New Zealand (6 titles)

The Women's Rugby World Cup is an international rugby union competition for women's national teams. The competition was first established in 1991, but the 1991 and 1994 competitions were not sanctioned at the time by the International Rugby Board (IRB, now World Rugby) and were not recognized by them until 2009. The 1998 World Cup was the first tournament sanctioned by the IRB.

New Zealand is the most successful team in the tournament by far. They have won six titles with four back-to-back victories from 1998 to 2010, only missing out in 2014, and resuming again from 2017 to 2021. England follow with three titles, and the United States with one. Canada has appeared in finals in both 2014 and 2025.

== History ==
The United States and England contested the first women's final in April 1991. England was in the lead 6–3 at halftime with a converted penalty try by Gill Burns. However, a resurgent US team ran in 16 unanswered points to claim the inaugural title.

The 1994 Women's Rugby World Cup was held three years later to avoid coinciding with the men's World Cup. The two finalists of the 1991 World Cup seemed destined to repeat their earlier encounter. After a very entertaining match England were the second team to win the trophy.

1998 saw a new champion in New Zealand as they dominated the United States in the final with eight tries. It was the first of four consecutive titles that New Zealand would win, but not without a fight from the English.

England eventually won their second title in 2014 with a shocking exit of New Zealand in the pool stage. Canada made their first appearance in a final before succumbing to England.

The 2017 Women's Rugby World Cup was held in the odd-numbered year for the first time since the inaugural tournament in 1991 which avoided the clash with the rugby 7s-based tournaments, both played in the Summer Olympics and the Commonwealth Games. New Zealand returned to the final for the first time since 2010, playing defending champions England, it was a closely contested match with an aggregate of 73 points by the two teams. New Zealand won their fifth title.

The 2021 competition was postponed to 2022 due to the COVID-19 pandemic and produced a repeat of the 2017 final as hosts and reigning champions New Zealand faced England. England came into the match on a winning streak of 30 matches and took an early lead before Lydia Thompson was sent off for a high tackle. England preserved their lead at 26–19 at half-time but their 14 players were ultimately unable to contain New Zealand, who finally took the lead with a 71st minute try by Ayesha Leti-I'iga. The game at Eden Park was watched by a record crowd for a women's rugby union match of 42,579.

The 2025 competition took place from 22 August to 27 September and it was held in England. For the first time since 2014, New Zealand was knocked out of the semi-final stage and failed to reach a major final. England won their third title and the first since 2014.

The 2029 competition will be held in Australia, two years after the men’s counterpart.

== Finals ==
List of final matches, and respective venues, finalists and scores
Year	Winners	Final score	Runners-up	Venue	Location	Attendance	Ref(s)
1991	United States	19–6	England	Cardiff Arms Park	Cardiff, Wales	c. 3,000	
1994	England	38–23	United States	Raeburn Place	Edinburgh, Scotland	5,000	
1998	New Zealand	44–12	United States	NRCA Stadium	Amsterdam, Netherlands	4,000	
2002	New Zealand	19–9	England	Olympic Stadium	Barcelona, Spain	8,000	
2006	New Zealand	25–17	England	Commonwealth Stadium	Edmonton, Canada	5,500	
2010	New Zealand	13–10	England	Twickenham Stoop	England	13,253	
2014	England	21–9	Canada	Stade Jean-Bouin	France	20,000	
2017	New Zealand	41–32	England	Kingspan Stadium	Belfast, Northern Ireland	17,115	
2021 (Note: The 2021 competition was postponed to 2022 due to the COVID19 pandemic.)	New Zealand	34–31	England	Eden Park	Auckland, New Zealand	42,579	
2025	England	33–13	Canada	Twickenham Stadium, London	England	81,885	

== Results by nation ==
List of total final results, and respective runners-up, years won and years runners-up
National team	Wins	Runners-up	Total finals	Years won	Years runners-up
New Zealand	6	0	6	1998, 2002, 2006, 2010, 2017, 2021	
England	3	6	9	1994, 2014, 2025	1991, 2002, 2006, 2010, 2017, 2021
United States	1	2	3	1991	1994, 1998
Canada	0	2	2		2014, 2025

== See also ==
- Rugby World Cup
