= Fiona Richards =

- Born: 23 December 1970 (age 55)
- Height: 1.74 m (5 ft 8 1/2 in)
- Weight: 73 kg (161 lb; 11 st 7 lb)

Rugby union career
- Position: Lock
Provincial / State sides
Years	Team	Apps	(Points)
- Auckland
International career
Years	Team	Apps	(Points)
1997-1999	New Zealand	14	
Medal record
Representing New Zealand
Women's rugby union
Rugby World Cup
Gold medal – first place	1998 Netherlands	Team competition

Fiona Richards (born 23 December 1970) is a former female rugby union player.

Richards made her Black Ferns debut on 4 October 1993 against a NZRFU President's XV at Wellington. She made her international debut a year later on 2 September against Australia at Sydney.

Richards played in the 1998 World Cup along with her older sister and fellow Black Fern Anna Richards. She represented Auckland provincially and the College Rifles Thunderbirds in the Auckland Club Championship with her sister. She retired from rugby in 2000 due to a knee injury.

Richards now coaches the Thunderbirds with another former Black Fern Rochelle Martin.
