= Khokhlov =

Khokhlov or Hohlov (Russian: Хохлов), feminine: Khokhlova or Hohlova, is a Russian surname derived from the word khokhol.

It may refer to:

- Aleksandr Khokhlov, Russian football player
- Aleksandra Khokhlova, Russian actress
- Dmitri Khokhlov (born 1975), Russian football player
- Iryna Khokhlova (born 1990), Ukrainian-born Argentine modern pentathlete
- Ivan Khokhlov (1895–1973), Russian politician
- Jana Khokhlova (born 1985), Russian ice dancer
- Leonid Khokhlov (born 1980), Russian swimmer
- Nikita Khokhlov (disambiguation)
- Nikolai Khokhlov (1922–2007), Soviet military officer
- Olga Khokhlova (1891–1955), Russian ballet dancer
- Svetlana Khokhlova (born 1984), Belarusian swimmer
