= 1998 Women's Rugby World Cup final =

1998 Women's Rugby World Cup Final
- Event: 1998 Women's Rugby World Cup
New Zealand	United States
(New Zealand)	(United States)
44	12
- Date: 16 May 1998
- Venue: NRCA Stadium, Amsterdam
- Referee: Ed Morrison (England)
- Attendance: 4,000

The 1998 Women's Rugby World Cup Final was a rugby union match to determine the winner of the 1998 Women's Rugby World Cup. The match took place on 16 May 1998 in Amsterdam and was between New Zealand and the United States. New Zealand beat the United States 44–12 to claim their first World Cup title.

== Route to the final ==
New Zealand
Round
United States
Opponent
Result
Pool stage
Opponent
Result
Germany
134–6
Match 1
Russia
84–0
Scotland
76–0
Match 2
Spain
38–16

Team	Won	Drawn	Lost	For	Against	Ladder
New Zealand	2	0	0	210	6	1st
Scotland	1	0	1	37	84	7th
Italy	1	0	1	42	42	11th
Germany	0	0	2	11	168	15th

Final standing

Team	Won	Drawn	Lost	For	Against	Ladder
United States	2	0	0	117	16	3rd
Spain	1	0	1	44	56	6th
Wales	1	0	1	101	35	9th
Russia	0	0	2	7	167	16th

Opponent
Result
Knockout stage
Opponent
Result
Spain
46–3
Quarter-finals
Scotland
25–10
England
44–11
Semi-finals
Canada
46–6

New Zealand was pooled with Scotland, Italy and World Cup debutantes, Germany. The United States were pooled with Spain, who missed the 1994 World Cup, along with Wales and Russia. New Zealand thrashed Germany 134–6 to record their first 100 points in a World Cup. They kept Scotland scoreless with 76–0 in their last pool game. The Black Ferns met Spain in their quarterfinal, they won 46–3 and went on to beat 1994 Champions, England, 44–11 to book their place in the Final.

The United States beat Russia in their first pool match 84–0, and then beat Spain 38–16. In their quarterfinal, they defeated Scotland in a closely contested match 25–10. Canada only managed 6 points against the United States 46 points in their semifinal game.

== Match ==
16 May 1998

New Zealand	44–12	United States
Try: Cootes (5); Palmer; Sheck; Wall

Referee: (England) E. F. Morrison

=== Summary ===
Vanessa Cootes scored five of the Black Ferns eight tries in the Final. (Note: The Black Ferns vs USA teamsheet on stats.allblacks.com and Cootes Black Ferns profile credits her as scoring five tries.) Farah Palmer, Regina Sheck and Louisa Wall scored a try each with Annaleah Rush making two successful conversions to give New Zealand their first World Cup title.
