= Elizabeth Andrew =

Elizabeth Andrew may refer to:

- Liz Andrew, Australian politician
- Elizabeth Andrew (rugby union), Australian rugby union player

== See also ==
- Elizabeth Andrews (disambiguation)
