= Suzy Shortland =

- Born: 23 January 1974 (age 52)
- Height: 1.6 m (5 ft 3 in)
- Weight: 63 kg (139 lb; 9 st 13 lb)

Rugby union career
- Position: Centre
Provincial / State sides
Years	Team	Apps	(Points)
- Auckland
International career
Years	Team	Apps	(Points)
1997–2002	New Zealand	18	
National sevens team
Years	Team		Comps
2000	New Zealand		
Medal record
Representing New Zealand
Women's rugby union
Rugby World Cup
Gold medal – first place	1998 Netherlands	Team competition
Gold medal – first place	2002 Spain	Team competition

Suzy Shortland (born 23 January 1974) is a former New Zealand female rugby union and sevens representative. She played at the 1998 and 2002 Women's Rugby World Cup.

Shortland was a member of the first official New Zealand women's sevens team, who took part in the 2000 Hong Kong Sevens. She also played at the 2001 Hong Kong Women's Sevens.
