= Fiona King =

- Born: 1 February 1972 (age 54) Auckland
- Height: 1.82 m (5 ft 11 1/2 in)
- Weight: 82 kg (181 lb; 12 st 13 lb)
- Occupation: Physiotherapist

Rugby union career
- Position: Lock
Provincial / State sides
Years	Team	Apps	(Points)
- Otago
-	North Harbour		
International career
Years	Team	Apps	(Points)
1996–2002	New Zealand	18	(5)
Medal record
Representing New Zealand
Women's rugby union
Rugby World Cup
Gold medal – first place	1998 Netherlands	Team competition
Gold medal – first place	2002 Spain	Team competition

Fiona King (née Barclay, born 1 February 1972 ) is a New Zealand former rugby union player. She represented New Zealand internationally and played provincially for Otago and North Harbour. She was a member of the 1998 and 2002 winning squads.

She has spoken at TEDxWellington.
