= Stacy Boyle =

American rugby union player

- Born: October 14, 1974 (age 52)
- Height: 170 cm (5 ft 7 in)
- Weight: 70 kg (154 lb)
- University: Pennsylvania State University

Rugby union career
Amateur team(s)
Years	Team	Apps	(Points)
- Keystone Rugby
International career
Years	Team	Apps	(Points)
1998–2002	United States	11	(-)

Stacy Boyle (born October 14, 1974) is an American former rugby union player. She played for the United States at the Women's Rugby World Cup in 1998 and in 2002.

== Life ==
Boyle played for Pennsylvania State University.
