= Mieke Fortune =

- Born: 4 January 1977 Adelaide
- Died: 18 August 2018 (aged 41)
- School: Sunshine Coast Grammar School

Rugby union career
- Position: Lock
International career
Years	Team	Apps	(Points)
1996–2002	Australia	10	(0)

Mieke Jane Fortune (née Gladwin; 4 January 1977 – 18 August 2018) was an Australian former rugby union player. She made her test debut as a Lock for Australia in 1996 against the Black Ferns in Sydney.

Fortune played ten tests for Australia between 1996 and 2002. She played club rugby for the University of Queensland and also represented Queensland. She competed for the Wallaroos at the 1998 and 2002 Rugby World Cup's.

After retiring from rugby, Fortune and her husband, Graham, moved to the Sunshine Coast and started a wholesale production nursery.

On 18 August 2018, Fortune died from breast cancer, she was honoured with a moment’s silence before the Wallaroos and Black Ferns first match for the O'Reilly Cup.
