= Maree Edwards (rugby union) =

New Zealand rugby union player

- Born: 8 February 1975 (age 51) Wairoa, New Zealand
- Height: 1.65 m (5 ft 5 in)
- Weight: 72 kg (159 lb)

Rugby union career
- Position: Halfback
Provincial / State sides
Years	Team	Apps	(Points)
	Canterbury	0	(0)
1993–2004	Otago	47	(0)
International career
Years	Team	Apps	(Points)
1998–2003	New Zealand	4	(5)
Medal record
Representing New Zealand
Women's rugby union
Rugby World Cup
Gold medal – first place	1998 Netherlands	Team competition

Maree Edwards (born 8 February 1975) is a former New Zealand rugby union player. She was a member of the New Zealand squad that won their first Rugby World Cup title at the 1998 tournament in the Netherlands.

== Rugby career ==
Edwards was part of the Black Ferns champion side that won the 1998 Rugby World Cup in Netherlands. She made her international debut at the tournament on 2 May against Germany.

In 2003, she was named in the Black Ferns squad to play a two-test series against a World XVs side in October that year. She played provincial rugby for Canterbury and Otago; and club rugby for Alhambra-Union.

In 2019 she received her Black Ferns cap in an official ceremony in Christchurch.
