= Josée Lacasse (rugby union) =

Canadian rugby union player (born 1970)

- Born: 9 March 1970 (age 56) Montreal, Quebec, Canada
- Height: 1.66 m (5 ft 5 1/2 in)
- Weight: 75 kg (165 lb; 11 st 11 lb)
- University: Concordia University
- Occupation: Financial advisor

Rugby union career
- Position: Prop
Amateur team(s)
| Years | Team | Apps | (Points) |
| ? | Concordia Stingers | | |
| – | Ste Anne de Bellevue RFC | | |
International career
| Years | Team | Apps | (Points) |
| 1992-2002 | Canada | 29 | |
Coaching career
- Years: Team
- Concordia Stingers

Josée Lacasse (born 9 March 1970) is a Canadian female rugby union player from Montreal, Quebec representing Canada at the 1994, 1998, and 2002 Women's Rugby World Cup.

She played for Concordia University where she completed a Bachelor's of Science in 1993. She was named as the fittest athlete in 1992-1993 and received the Academic Athlete of the Year award in 1991–1992.

In 1992, Lacasse made her first appearance on the national squad. In 2004, she was the most capped player of the Canadian senior women's team. Lacasse was also an honorable mention for the list of the ten greatest North American rugby players. She retired after the 2002 world cup with 29 caps.
