= Julie Taylor =

Julie Taylor may refer to:

- Julie Taylor (rugby union) (born 1970), rugby player
- Julie Taylor, a character from the TV show Friday Night Lights
- Julie Ann Taylor (born 1966), American voice actress
- Julie S. Taylor, British nurse scientist and academic
