= Sue Day =

England international rugby union player

Sue Day MBE
- Born: 29 October 1972 (age 54) England
- Height: 1.66 m (5 ft 5 in)
- Weight: 70 kg (150 lb)

Rugby union career
- Position: Wing/Centre/Fullback
Senior career
Years	Team	Apps	(Points)
1996-2010	Wasps RFC		
International career
Years	Team	Apps	(Points)
1997-?	England	59	(305)
National sevens team
Years	Team		Comps
2009	England		RWC 7s
Medal record
Representing England
Women's rugby union
Rugby World Cup
Silver medal – second place	2006 Canada	Team competition
Silver medal – second place	2002 Spain	Team competition
Bronze medal – third place	1998 Netherlands	Team competition

Susan Margaret Day MBE (born 29 October 1972) is an English female rugby union footballer who played fullback for London Wasps Ladies and for England.

== Career ==
Day made her England debut versus Spain in 1997. She was selected for the 2006 Six Nations Squad. She appeared again for the 2007 Six Nations opener. She can play on the wing, in the centre or at fullback. Day played in three Rugby World Cups and is England's top try scorer with 61 tries in 59 caps. 'Daisy', as she is known to her team mates, is the top try scorer in IRB world cups, with 19 tries. After retiring from 15s, Day returned to the international game, captaining Simon Amor and Mike Friday's 7's squad to the 7's world cup in March 2009.

In 2013 Day became the first female president of Wasps FC in their 146-year history.

She was appointed Member of the Order of the British Empire (MBE) in the 2020 Birthday Honours for services to gender equality in sport.

== Honours ==
International Rugby Board awards

- World Rugby Hall of Fame Inductee Number 178: 2026
