= Jacinta Nielsen =

- Born: May 30, 1972 (age 54) Dunedin, New Zealand
- Height: 1.7 m (5 ft 7 in)

Rugby union career
Provincial / State sides
Years	Team	Apps	(Points)
- Otago
International career
Years	Team	Apps	(Points)
1997–2000	New Zealand	7	(0)
Medal record
Representing New Zealand
Women's rugby union
Rugby World Cup
Gold medal – first place	1998 Netherlands	Team competition

Jacinta Nielsen (born May 30, 1972) is a former New Zealand rugby union player. She debuted for the Black Ferns on 16 August 1997 against Australia at Dunedin. She was selected for the 1998 Women's Rugby World Cup squad.

She played club rugby for Alhambra-Union.
