= Regina Sheck =

- Born: 9 November 1969 (age 57)
- Height: 1.68 m (5 ft 6 in)
- Weight: 87 kg (192 lb; 13 st 10 lb)

Rugby union career
- Position: Prop
Provincial / State sides
Years	Team	Apps	(Points)
- Waikato
-	Auckland		
International career
Years	Team	Apps	(Points)
1994–2004	New Zealand	26	(25)
Medal record
Representing New Zealand
Women's rugby union
Rugby World Cup
Gold medal – first place	1998 Netherlands	Team competition
Gold medal – first place	2002 Spain	Team competition

Regina Sheck (born 9 November 1969) is a former New Zealand rugby union player. She played for the Black Ferns and was a member of the 1998 and 2002 Women's Rugby World Cup squad.

In 2012, she was a member of the re-established Waikato women's rugby team that was absent for six years. She is a Police Officer of Samoan descent.

Sheck played in the two test series against England in 2001.
