= Cheryl Smith =

Cheryl Smith may refer to:

- Cheryl Smith (actress) (1955–2002), American actress and musician
- Cheryl Smith (rugby union) (1970–2026), New Zealand rugby union player, coach and administrator
