= Janet Heenan =

- Born: July 29, 1969 (age 57) Whangārei, New Zealand
- Height: 1.67 m (5 ft 6 in)

Rugby union career
- Position: Flanker
Provincial / State sides
Years	Team	Apps	(Points)
- Northland
International career
Years	Team	Apps	(Points)
1996–1998	New Zealand	5	(0)
Medal record
Representing New Zealand
Women's rugby union
Rugby World Cup
Gold medal – first place	1998 Netherlands	Team competition

Janet Heenan (born July 29, 1969) is a former New Zealand rugby union player. She played for the Black Ferns and Northland. She made her debut for New Zealand on 31 August 1996 against Australia at Sydney. She was selected for the 1998 Women's Rugby World Cup squad.
