= Tracey Waters =

- Born: 28 August 1973 (age 53) Timaru, Canterbury
- Height: 1.72 m (5 ft 7 1/2 in)
- Weight: 85 kg (187 lb; 13 st 5 lb)

Rugby union career
- Position: Loosehead Prop
Amateur team(s)
Years	Team	Apps	(Points)
- Lincoln
–	Renwick		
–	Moutere		
Provincial / State sides
Years	Team	Apps	(Points)
- Canterbury
-	Wellington		
-	Marlborough		
International career
Years	Team	Apps	(Points)
1995–1998	New Zealand	10	(5)
Medal record
Representing New Zealand
Women's rugby union
Rugby World Cup
Gold medal – first place	1998 Netherlands	Team competition

Tracey Marshall (née Waters; born 28 August 1973) is a former female rugby union player. She represented New Zealand and Canterbury. She was a member of the 1998 Women's Rugby World Cup winning squad.
