= Kerri Louise Ferris =

- Born: 9 January 1970 (age 56) Gisborne, New Zealand
- School: Woden Valley High School, Narrabundah College

Rugby union career
- Position: Halfback
International career
Years	Team	Apps	(Points)
1994–2002	Australia	13	(0)

Kerri Louise Ferris (born 9 January 1970) is a former Australian rugby union player. She made her test debut for Australia in 1994 against the Black Ferns in Sydney. She competed at the 1998 and 2002 Rugby World Cup's.

Ferris was born in Gisborne, New Zealand. Her family moved to Australia when she was ten. She made 13 test appearances for the Wallaroos between 1994 and 2002. Her last test match was in the 2002 World Cup in Spain, it was against Scotland in Girona.

In 2022, Ferris was appointed as the Kariong Wanderers head coach, making her the first female rugby union head coach in the region. She was inducted into the NSW Waratahs inaugural Hall of Fame in June 2024.
