= Farah Palmer =

New Zealand academic and former rugby player

Dame Farah Palmer DNZM
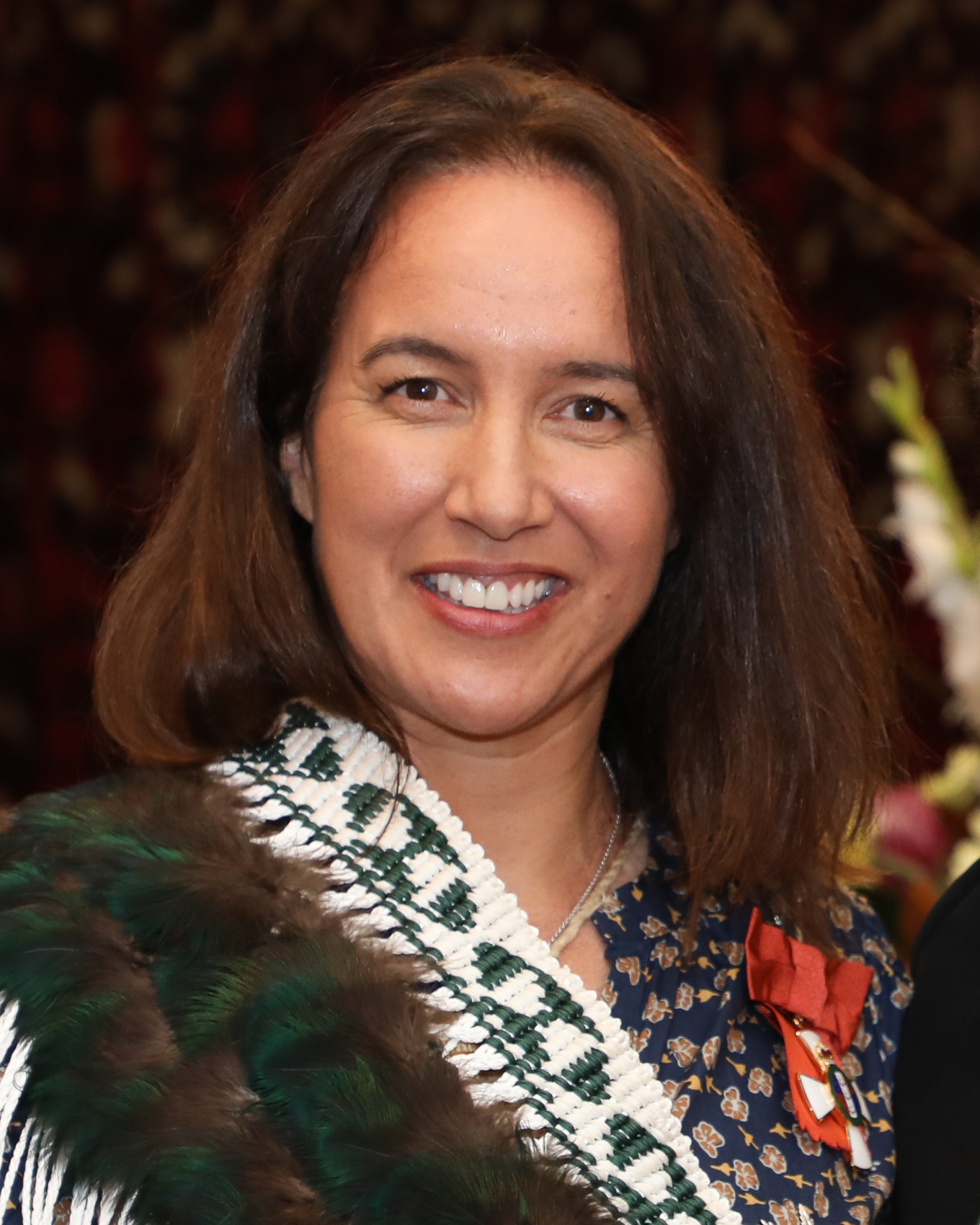
- Palmer in 2023
- Born: Farah Rangikoepa Palmer; 27 November 1972 (age 53); Te Kūiti, New Zealand

Academic background
- Education: Piopio College
- Alma mater: University of Otago
- Thesis: Maori girls, power, physical education, sport, and play: "being hungus, hori, and hoha" (2000)

Academic work
- Discipline: Sport management
- Institutions: Massey University
- Height: 1.64 m (5 ft 5 in)
- Weight: 69 kg (152 lb)

Rugby union career
- Position: Hooker
Amateur team(s)
| Years | Team | Apps | (Points) |
| – | Otago University | | |
| – | Waikato University | | |
| – | Alhambra Union RFC | | |
| – | Kia Toa RFC | | |
Provincial / State sides
| Years | Team | Apps | (Points) |
| 1992–96, 1998–2000 | Otago | | |
| 1997 | Waikato | | |
| 2001–2006 | Manawatu | | |
International career
| Years | Team | Apps | (Points) |
| 1996–2006 | New Zealand | 35 | (25) |
Medal record
Representing New Zealand
Women's rugby union
Rugby World Cup
| Gold medal – first place | 1998 Netherlands | Team competition |
| Gold medal – first place | 2002 Spain | Team competition |
| Gold medal – first place | 2006 Canada | Team competition |

Dame Farah Rangikoepa Palmer DNZM (born 27 November 1972) is a professor at Massey University and a former captain of New Zealand's women's rugby union team, the Black Ferns.

== Youth and early career ==
Palmer was born in Te Kūiti, New Zealand, and raised in Piopio. While at primary and secondary school, Palmer played netball competitively, and also participated in athletics, swimming, tennis, and cross-country. Although she had played rugby socially before, Palmer started playing regularly after she moved to Otago University to study physical education. She joined the University club in 1992 and that year played her first match for Otago. By 1994 she was playing regularly for Otago. Originally a prop, she changed to hooker.

== National team ==
Palmer first played for New Zealand on 31 August 1996 against Australia in Sydney—a match won 28–5. That year she was also appointed Otago captain and became the captain of the Black Ferns in 1997 with a 67–0 win over England.

In 1997, Palmer moved temporarily to Hamilton and played for Waikato University club as well as representing Waikato. She moved back to Dunedin in 1998 where she played for Alhambra Union. That year she captained the Black Ferns to victory in the 1998 Women's Rugby World Cup. That year she was awarded Women's Player of the Year by the New Zealand Rugby Union. She completed her PhD in 2000, and in 2001 moved to Palmerston North to take up a position in sports management at Massey University. There she joined the Kia Toa rugby club. Palmer continued to captain the Black Ferns and led them to a second World Championship in 2002.

In 2005, she missed her first match for the Black Ferns since 1996 due to injury. That year she was awarded International Women's Personality of the Year by the International Rugby Board (IRB). Representing Manawatu, she helped them earn promotion to the national women's championship in 2006, and that year captained the Black Ferns in her third World Cup. After defeating England 25–17 in the final of the 2006 World Cup Palmer announced her retirement from playing. During her time as captain the Black Ferns lost only once, and her 35 Tests for the Black Ferns is the second only to Anna Richards' 49.

=== Recognition ===
Palmer was one of six women inducted into the IRB Hall of Fame on 17 November 2014. In 2016, the Women's Provincial Championship was renamed the Farah Palmer Cup in her honour.

In 2016, she was awarded the Manawatu Standard Person of the Year award and was the first woman to win the award. Also in 2016, she was the first woman to be appointed to the board of New Zealand Rugby.

In 2018, Palmer won the Board and Management Award of the 2018 Women of Influence Awards. In 2022, she was awarded the Vernon Pugh Award for Distinguished Service.

Palmer has served on the New Zealand Māori Rugby Board since 2007, and has been a member of the NZ Rugby Board since 2016.

In the 2023 New Year Honours, Palmer was promoted to Dame Companion of the New Zealand Order of Merit, for services to sport, particularly rugby.

== Academic career ==
Farah Palmer graduated from Otago University with a BPhEd(Hons) in 1994 and a PhD in 2000. In 2014, she conducted research to examine how leadership and culture affect success at rugby.

== Personal life ==
Palmer is a New Zealander of Māori descent (Ngāti Maniapoto and Waikato Tainui descent).
