= Melissa Latu =

- Born: 31 July 1973 (age 53) Melbourne
- School: Heidelberg High School; Balwyn High School; Box Hill Technical School

Rugby union career
- Position: Prop
International career
Years	Team	Apps	(Points)
1997–2002	Australia	12	(0)

Melissa Akanesi Latu (born 31 July 1973) is a former Australian rugby union player. She made her test debut for Australia in 1997 against the United States in Brisbane. She represented the Wallaroos at the 1998 Rugby World Cup in the Netherlands.

Latu joined the Wallaroos for the 2002 Rugby World Cup in Spain just 12 weeks after giving birth to her first child. She was named in the starting line-up that faced the Black Ferns in the Wallaroos last pool game.

Latu's uncle, Samuel Latu, played for the Tongan team that beat the Wallabies in 1972. She played for the Box Hill Fillies in Victoria. She is the owner of Muscle Action Therapies.
