= Sharon O'Kane =

- Born: 27 September 1976 (age 50) Canberra
- School: Charnwood High School, ACT

Rugby union career
- Position: Wing
International career
Years	Team	Apps	(Points)
1996–2002	Australia	15	(40)

Sharon Carson (née O'Kane; born 27 September 1976) is a former Australian rugby union player. She made her test debut and scored the first test try for Australia in 1996 against New Zealand in Sydney. She was part of the Wallaroos 1998 and 2002 Rugby World Cup squads.
