= Sherri Sparling =

Canadian rugby union footballer (born 1969)

- Born: 19 March 1969 (age 57) Ottawa

Rugby union career
- Position(s): Centre, Fullback, Wing
Amateur team(s)
Years	Team	Apps	(Points)
–	Ottawa Irish		
International career
Years	Team	Apps	(Points)
5	Canada		

Sherri Sparling (born 19 March 1969) is a Canadian former rugby union player.

A long serving captain of the Canada women's national rugby union team, she also participated at the 1998 Women's Rugby World Cup and 2002 Women's Rugby World Cup. She was an honorable mention for the list of the ten greatest North American rugby players.
