= Lotu =

Lotu may refer to:

== People ==
- Brigitta Lotu-Iiga (born 1968), New Zealand rugby union player
- Lotu Filipine (born 1980), rugby union football player
- Lotu Fuli, politician
- Lotu Inisi (born 1999), Tongan rugby union player
- Sam Lotu-Iiga, politician

== Places ==
- Loțu, Romania

== Other ==
- "Lotu", the Tongan and Fijian word for religion and prayer (Religion in Tonga, in Fiji)
