= Alexandra Williams =

Rugby union career
- Position: Number 8
International career
Years	Team	Apps	(Points)
1993	United States	25	

Alexandra Williams is an American former rugby union player. She represented the United States at the 1994, 1998 and 2002 Rugby World Cup's.

Williams helped set up the Women's Premier League. She played for Harvard-Radcliffe RFC, Beantown RFC and for Berkeley All Blues. Williams made her first appearance for the Eagles at the 1993 Canada Cup. She also played at the 1996 and 2000 Canada Cup's.

In 2018 Williams was inducted into the U.S. Rugby Hall of Fame.
