= Toni Konui =

- Born: 6 November 1966 (age 60)
- Height: 1.62 m (5 ft 4 in)
- Weight: 78 kg (172 lb; 12 st 4 lb)

Rugby union career
- Position: Hooker
Amateur team(s)
| Years | Team | Apps | (Points) |
- College Rifles
Provincial / State sides
| Years | Team | Apps | (Points) |
- Auckland
International career
| Years | Team | Apps | (Points) |
| 1998 | New Zealand | 4 | |
Medal record
Representing New Zealand
Women's rugby union
Rugby World Cup
| Gold medal – first place | 1998 Netherlands | Team competition |

Toni Konui (born 6 November 1966) is a former rugby union player. She represented New Zealand at the 1998 Women's Rugby World Cup. She played for College Rifles and Auckland.
