= Bronwyn Laidlaw =

- Born: 27 December 1974 (age 51) Nambour, Queensland
- School: Immanuel Lutheran College

Rugby union career
- Position: Fullback
International career
Years	Team	Apps	(Points)
1997–2006	Australia	10	(0)

Bronwyn Laidlaw (born 27 December 1974) is an Australian former rugby union player.

Laidlaw made her Wallaroos test debut in 1997 against the United States in Brisbane. She was part of Australia's first Rugby World Cup squad that competed at the 1998 tournament in the Netherlands. She had dislocated her collarbone in the Wallaroos quarter-final loss to England in 1998 but continued playing. She was also named in the 2002 and 2006 Rugby World Cup squads.

In April 2022, Laidlaw was one of more than 100 former Queensland women's players who were honoured with caps at the Reds and Melbourne Rebels Super W match at Suncorp Stadium.
