= Nancy Fitz =

American rugby player

- Born: January 24, 1967 (age 59)

Rugby union career
- Position: Lock
International career
Years	Team	Apps	(Points)
1996 - 2002	United States		
National sevens team
Years	Team		Comps
1997 - 1999	United States		

Nancy Fitz (born January 24, 1967) is an American former rugby union player. She appeared in the 1998 Women's Rugby World Cup and 2002 Women's Rugby World Cup for the United States. She will be inducted into the USA Rugby Hall of Fame on July 13, 2024.

She was captain and coach for the D.C. Furies.
