= Pearl Palaiali'i =

- Born: 7 January 1970 (age 56) Auckland, New Zealand
- School: Tamaki College, Auckland

Rugby union career
- Position: Prop
International career
| Years | Team | Apps | (Points) |
| 1994–2002 | Australia | 14 | (0) |

Pearl Urima Kaleopa-Palaiali'i (born 7 January 1970) is a former Australian rugby union player. She made her test debut for Australia in 1994 against New Zealand in Sydney. She competed for the Wallaroos at the 1998 and 2002 Rugby World Cup's.

In 2019, Palaiali'i played for the Classic Wallaroos team in a ten-a-side match against a Central North women's side.

She was inducted into the NSW Waratahs inaugural Hall of Fame in June 2024.
