= Nikita Khokhlov =

Nikita Khokhlov may refer to:

- Nikita Khokhlov (footballer, born 1983), Kazakhstani football player
- Nikita Khokhlov (footballer, born 1996), Russian football player
