= Monique Hirovanaa =

- Born: 25 May 1966 (age 60) Ōtāhuhu, New Zaealand
- Height: 1.55 m (5 ft 1 in)
- Weight: 70 kg (150 lb; 11 st 0 lb)

Rugby union career
- Position: Halfback
Provincial / State sides
Years	Team	Apps	(Points)
- Auckland
International career
Years	Team	Apps	(Points)
1994–2002	New Zealand	26	(90)
Medal record
Representing New Zealand
Women's rugby union
Rugby World Cup
Gold medal – first place	1998 Netherlands	Team competition
Gold medal – first place	2002 Spain	Team competition

Monique Hirovanaa (born 25 May 1966) is a former New Zealand rugby union player. She played for New Zealand and Auckland. She was in the squad that won the 1998 Women's Rugby World Cup and the 2002 Women's Rugby World Cup.

In 2018, Hirovanaa was inducted into the Ōtara Sports Hall of Fame at the Ōtara Sports Awards on 1 December at Kia Aroha College. In 2025, she was inducted into the Pasifika Rugby Hall of Fame.
