= Diane Schnapp =

- Born: June 29, 1968 (age 58)
- Height: 167 cm (5 ft 6 in)
- Weight: 69 kg (152 lb)
- Occupation: firefighter

Rugby union career
Amateur team(s)
Years	Team	Apps	(Points)
- Berkley All-Blues
International career
Years	Team	Apps	(Points)
1998-2004?	United States		
National sevens team
Years	Team		Comps
1999-?	United States		

Diane Schnapp (born 29 June 1968) is a former American rugby union player. She participated in the 1998 Women's Rugby World Cup and the 1999 Hong Kong Women's Sevens. Schnapp played at openside flank.

Though small in size, Schnapp's strength, courage, and character as a monster on the field made her one of ten greatest North American players. She is also considered the nation's best defensive player and was thus named to the 2000-2009 Women's Rugby Team and Players of the Decade from Rugbymag.com.
