= Candi Orsini =

American rugby union player

- Born: 9 December 1956 (age 69)
- Height: 1.68 m (5 ft 6 in)

Rugby union career
- Position: Centre
International career
Years	Team	Apps	(Points)
1987–1998?	United States		
Coaching career
- Years: Team
- –: United States

Candi Orsini (born 9 December 1956) is a former American rugby union player. She participated in the 1991, 1994, and 1998 Women's Rugby World Cup. After retiring, Orsini served as an assistant coach of the United States women's national rugby union team. She received an honourable mention to the list of the ten greatest North American Women rugby union players.

== Biography ==
A native of St. Petersburg Orsini attended Boca Ciega High School in Gulfport, Florida. She participated in swimming, bowling, golf and track during her High School years. She graduated from Boca Ciega High School in 1974 and then attended St. Petersburg College before she went to Florida State University. While at Florida State she competed in volleyball, softball and rugby union.

Outside of rugby Orsini is an accomplished stuntwoman.

Orsini made her debut for the Eagles on 14 November 1987 against Canada. It was a historic game in that it was the first women's test match played outside of Europe.

In 2017 Orsini and the 1991 World Cup squad were inducted into the United States Rugby Hall of Fame.
