= Pamela Irby =

- Born: September 8, 1964 (age 62)
- Height: 1.65 m (5 ft 5 in)

Rugby union career
- Position: Wing
International career
Years	Team	Apps	(Points)
1994, 1998	United States		
National sevens team
Years	Team		Comps
2002	United States		

Pamela Irby (born September 8, 1964) is an American former rugby union player. She represented the United States at the 1994 and 1998 Rugby World Cup's.

Irby also played for the Eagles sevens team and competed at the 2002 Hong Kong Women's Sevens.
