= Pasifika Rugby Hall of Fame =

- Awarded for: Rugby union players of Pasifika heritage who have shaped the sport
- First award: 28 March 2024
- Latest award: 26 March 2026
- Website: www.prhof.org.nz

The Pasifika Rugby Hall of Fame is a figurative hall of fame dedicated to rugby union players of Pasifika heritage who have shaped the sport of rugby. The hall was established in 2024, with the first inductions made at a gala dinner at Eden Park, Auckland, New Zealand, on 28 March 2024.

== Laureates ==
The following is a complete list of laureates of the Pasifika Rugby Hall of Fame.

Year	Laureate	Notes
2024	Fiao'o Fa'amausili	
2024	Peter Fatialofa	
2024	Brian Lima	
2024	Jonah Lomu	
2024	Waisale Serevi	
2024	George Smith	
2024	Bryan Williams	
2025	Malakai Alatini	
2025	Seremaia Bai	
2025	Monique Hirovanaa	
2025	Michael Jones	
2025	Viliami Ofahengaue	
2025	Va'aiga Tuigamala	
2025	Tana Umaga	
2026	Alaisalatemaota Bakulich-Leavasa	
2026	Jerry Collins	
2026	DJ Forbes	
2026	Keven Mealamu	
2026	Taufusi Salesa	
2026	Pio Bosco Tikoisuva	
2026	Feʻao Vunipola	
