= Shelley Rae =

England international rugby union player

- Born: 1 June 1976 (age 50) Cambridge
- Height: 5 ft 8 in (1.73 m)
- Weight: 70 kg (154 lb)

Rugby union career
- Position: Flyhalf
Amateur team(s)
Years	Team	Apps	(Points)
- Shelford
Senior career
Years	Team	Apps	(Points)
- Wasps
International career
Years	Team	Apps	(Points)
1997–2008	England	44	(258)
National sevens team
Years	Team		Comps
- England
Medal record
Representing England
Women's rugby union
Rugby World Cup
Silver medal – second place	2006 Canada	Team competition
Silver medal – second place	2002 Spain	Team competition

Shelley Rae (born 1 June 1976) is a former English female rugby union player. She represented England at the 2002 and 2006 Women's Rugby World Cup. Rae retired from international rugby in 2008. She scored her first try in 2001 when England beat New Zealand 22–17 in Auckland, a side that previously went undefeated for 10 years. She also won the IRB Female Player of the Year Award in 2001.
