= Rochelle Martin =

Rochelle Martin MNZM
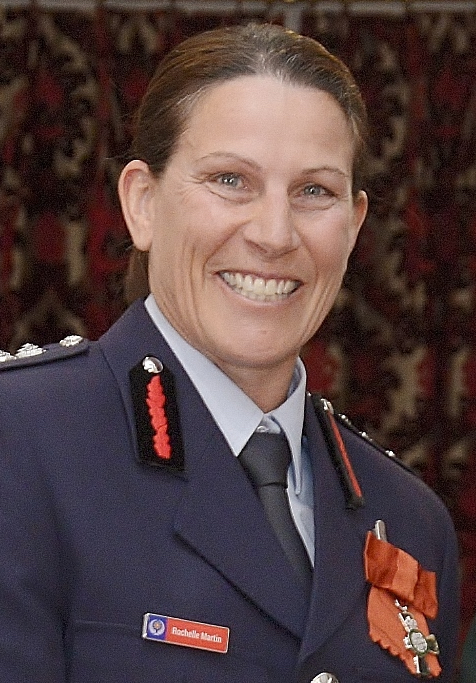
- Martin in 2018
- Born: 28 March 1973 (age 53)
- Height: 1.73 m (5 ft 8 in)
- Weight: 70 kg (150 lb; 11 st 0 lb)
- Occupation: Firefighter

Rugby union career
- Position: Number eight
Provincial / State sides
Years	Team	Apps	(Points)
	Auckland		(0)
International career
Years	Team	Apps	(Points)
1994–2006	New Zealand	34	(70)
Medal record
Women's rugby union
Representing New Zealand
Rugby World Cup
Gold medal – first place	1998 Netherlands	Team competition
Gold medal – first place	2002 Spain	Team competition
Gold medal – first place	2006 Canada	Team competition

Rochelle Lisa Martin MNZM (born 28 March 1973) is a former New Zealand rugby union player. She represented New Zealand and Auckland. She was a member of the 1998, 2002 and 2006 champion sides.

Martin made her international debut for the Black Ferns on 2 September 1994 against Australia at Sydney. She was also part of the squads that won the Canada Cup in 1996 and 2005, and the 2004 Churchill Cup. At the 1998 Rugby World Cup, she scored two tries against Germany in the Black Ferns record 134–6 victory.

Martin works as a firefighter in Auckland. Earlier in 2014 her home was burglarized and several of her rugby mementos were stolen.

== Honours ==
In the 2018 Queen's Birthday Honours, Martin was appointed a Member of the New Zealand Order of Merit, for services to rugby and Fire and Emergency New Zealand.

International Rugby Board awards

- World Rugby Hall of Fame Inductee Number 180: 2026
