= Cheryl Smith (rugby union) =

New Zealand rugby union player, coach and administrator (1970–2026)

Cheryl Smith MNZM
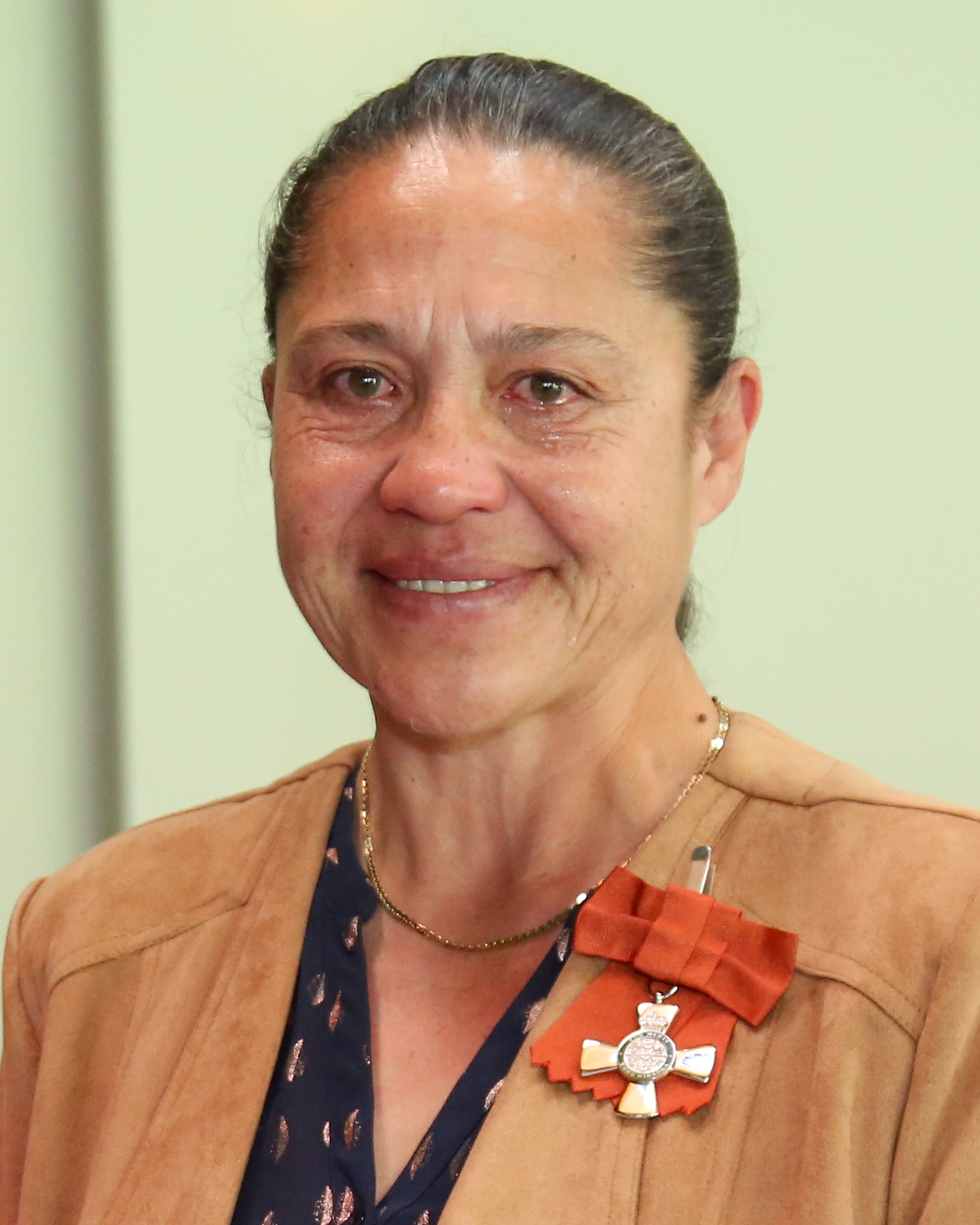
- Smith in 2023
- Born: Cheryl Moana Waaka; 12 May 1970 Rawene, New Zealand
- Died: 11 October 2026 (aged 56)
- Height: 1.75 m (5 ft 9 in)
- Weight: 80 kg (176 lb)
- School: Northland College

Rugby union career
- Position: Loose forward
Provincial / State sides
Years	Team	Apps	(Points)
- Auckland
International career
Years	Team	Apps	(Points)
1997	New Zealand	20	(35)
Medal record
Representing New Zealand
Women's rugby union
Rugby World Cup
Gold medal – first place	1998 Netherlands	Team competition
Gold medal – first place	2002 Spain	Team competition

Cheryl Moana Smith MNZM (née Waaka; 12 May 1970 – 11 October 2026) was a New Zealand rugby union player, coach and administrator. She represented New Zealand and Auckland as a flanker or number 8.

== Biography ==
Cheryl Moana Waaka was born at Rawene on 12 May 1970. Her father, Wattie Waaka, played rugby for New Zealand Māori.

She was educated at Northland College, and represented Northland in netball, not playing senior rugby until she was in her mid 20s. After moving to Auckland, she gained selection to the national women's rugby union team, the Black Ferns. Waaka made her international debut on 13 August 1997 against England at Burnham. She was part of the team that won the 1998 and 2002 Rugby World Cups.

In 2005, Waaka became the first woman in Northland to coach a senior men's club rugby team.

In the 2023 New Year Honours, Smith was appointed a Member of the New Zealand Order of Merit (MNZM), for services to rugby.

Smith died on 11 October 2026, at the age of 56, having been diagnosed with bowel cancer the previous year.
