= Brigitta Lotu-Iiga =

New Zealand rugby union player

- Born: 9 February 1968 (age 58) Apia, Samoa
- Height: 1.73 m (5 ft 8 in)
- Weight: 70 kg (154 lb)
- School: Epsom Girls' Grammar School
- Notable relative: Sam Lotu-Iiga (brother)
- Occupation: Flight attendant

Rugby union career
- Position: Flanker
Provincial / State sides
Years	Team	Apps	(Points)
- Auckland
-	North Harbour		
-	Counties Manukau		
International career
Years	Team	Apps	(Points)
1998	New Zealand	5	(0)
Medal record
Representing New Zealand
Women's rugby union
Rugby World Cup
Gold medal – first place	1998 Netherlands	Team competition

Brigitta B. Lotu-Iiga (born 9 February 1968) is a former New Zealand rugby union player. She made her debut for the New Zealand women's national side, the Black Ferns, on 2 May against Germany at the 1998 Women's Rugby World Cup. She made her final appearance at a Bledisloe Cup curtain raiser match against Australia in Sydney; the Black Ferns won 27–3.

Her younger brother is former New Zealand MP, Sam Lotu-Iiga.
