= Heather Hunt =

- Born: 16 October 1973 (age 53)
- Height: 1.73 m (5 ft 8 in)
- Weight: 68 kg (150 lb; 10 st 10 lb)
- Occupation: Financial assistant

Rugby union career
Amateur team(s)
| Years | Team | Apps | (Points) |
| ? | Toronto Scottish | | |
International career
| Years | Team | Apps | (Points) |
| 1995-2000 | Canada | 13 | |

Heather Hunt (born 16 October 1973) is a Canadian rugby union player. She represents Canada and was a member of the squad to the 1998 Women's Rugby World Cup. Hunt was known as a strong runner who created gaps and had a devastating straight arm.

Selected to the national squad in 1995. Her first cap was at the test match against France on 11 September 1996 at the Canada Cup in Edmonton. She played for the Toronto Scottish for nine years. Hunt also refereed for rugby and lives in Toronto with her partner, Mingo.
