= Sheri Hunt =

- University: University of Florida (B.Sc.); UC San Diego (M.Sc., Ph.D.)

Rugby union career
- Position: Flanker
International career
Years	Team	Apps	(Points)
- United States

Sheri Hunt is an American researcher and former rugby union player. She was a member of the United States squad that won the inaugural 1991 Women's Rugby World Cup in Wales. She also featured at the 1994 and 1998 Rugby World Cups.

Hunt earned a Bachelor of Science degree in Chemistry and Mathematics from the University of Florida. She then attained a Master of Science degree in Physical Chemistry and a Ph.D. in Biophysical Inorganic Chemistry from the University of California, San Diego.

Hunt and the 1991 World Cup squad were inducted into the United States Rugby Hall of Fame in 2017.
