= Elizabeth Andrews (disambiguation) =

Elizabeth Andrews may refer to:

- Elizabeth Andrews (1882–1960), first woman organiser of the Labour Party in Wales
- Elizabeth B. Andrews (1911–2002), U.S. Representative from Alabama
- Elizabeth Kay Andrews, Baroness Andrews (born 1943), British politician
- Elizabeth Marie Andrews (Born 2003), Medical Student in Houston, Texas

== See also ==
- Liz Andrew (1948–1993), Australian politician
- Elizabeth Andrew (rugby union) (born 1971), Australian rugby player
