= Emma Thomas (rugby union) =

New Zealand rugby union player

- Born: November 6, 1958 (age 68) Te Kūiti, New Zealand
- Height: 1.55 m (5 ft 1 in)

Rugby union career
- Position: Prop
Provincial / State sides
Years	Team	Apps	(Points)
- Bay of Plenty
International career
Years	Team	Apps	(Points)
1996–1998	New Zealand	9	(0)
Medal record
Representing New Zealand
Women's rugby union
Rugby World Cup
Gold medal – first place	1998 Netherlands	Team competition

Emma Thomas (born November 6, 1958) is a former rugby union player. She represented New Zealand and Bay of Plenty. She made her international debut on 31 August 1996 against Australia at Sydney. She competed at the 1998 Women's Rugby World Cup.

Thomas made her last appearance for the Black Ferns on 29 August 1998 against Australia at Sydney.
