= Maryanne Sorenson =

American rugby player (born 1956)

- Born: October 11, 1956 (age 70)
- Height: 167 cm (5 ft 6 in)
- Weight: 75 kg (165 lb)
- University: College of William and Mary

Rugby union career
- Position: Prop
International career
Years	Team	Apps	(Points)
1990-2000	United States	25	

Maryanne Sorenson (born 11 October 1956) is a former American rugby union player. She debuted for the Eagles in 1990. She was a member of the United States squad that won the 1991 Women's Rugby World Cup. She also played at the 1994 and 1998 World Cup's.

Sorenson began her rugby career in 1975 at the College of William and Mary. After graduating she moved to Philadelphia for medical school and played with the Philadelphia Women's Rugby Football Club from 1978 to 2000. From 1984 to 1986, she also played with the Bethlehem Maulie Maguires. She is an Anesthesiologist.

== Test match appearances ==
- 1993 – Canada Cup (vs. England & Canada)
- 1996 – Canada Cup (vs. France, NZ & Canada)
- 1997 – Australia Tour (vs. Australia & Fiji)
- 1999 – New Zealand Tour (vs. Canada, NZ)
