= Dianne Kahura =

NZ international rugby union player

- Born: 1 May 1969 (age 57)
- Height: 1.65 m (5 ft 5 in)
- Weight: 60 kg (9 st 6 lb)

Rugby union career
- Position: Wing
Provincial / State sides
Years	Team	Apps	(Points)
- Auckland
International career
Years	Team	Apps	(Points)
1998–2002	New Zealand	12	
National sevens team
Years	Team		Comps
- New Zealand
Medal record
Representing New Zealand
Women's rugby union
Rugby World Cup
Gold medal – first place	1998 Netherlands	Team competition
Gold medal – first place	2002 Spain	Team competition

Dianne Kahura (born 1 May 1969) is a former rugby union player for the Black Ferns. She debuted in 1998 and played 12 tests for New Zealand. She played in the 1998 and 2002 Women's Rugby World Cup.

Kahura was a member of the first official New Zealand women's sevens team, who took part in the 2000 Hong Kong Sevens. She was also in the squad that won the 2001 Hong Kong Women's Sevens.
