= Tanya Osborne =

Australian female rugby union player

- Born: 2 April 1971 (age 55)
- Height: 1.67 m (5 ft 6 in)
- Weight: 72 kg (159 lb)

Rugby union career
- Position: Scrumhalf / Fly-half
International career
Years	Team	Apps	(Points)
1996–2001	Australia	10	(0)

Tanya Lesley Osborne (born 2 April 1971) is a former Australian rugby union player. She represented Australia and was a member of the squad to the 1998 Rugby World Cup.

Osborne was born and raised in Cunnamulla, Queensland. She was working for Australia Post when she was selected to play for the Wallaroos.

Osborne made her international debut for Australia in the 1996 Laurie O'Reilly Cup test match against the Black Ferns. She made her final appearance for the Wallaroos in 2001 against England at Sydney.

Osborne joined the Australian Army in 2018 and served with A Battery, 1st Regiment, Royal Australian Artillery which is based at Gallipoli Barracks in Brisbane.
