= Julie Taylor (rugby union) =

Scotland women's international rugby union player

- Full name: Julie Taylor
- Born: 30 January 1970 (age 56)
- Height: 5 ft 8 in (173 cm)
- Weight: 11 st 3 lb (71 kg)

Rugby union career
- Position: Prop
Senior career
Years	Team	Apps	(Points)
1988–1992	Aberdeen University		
1992–1998	Edinburgh Academicals		
International career
Years	Team	Apps	(Points)
1993–1998	Scotland		

Julie Taylor (born 30 January 1970) is a Scottish rugby Union player. She played in Scotland's first international match against Ireland in 1993. She also played in the 1994 Women's Rugby World Cup and the 1998 Women's Rugby World Cup. She played her club rugby for Edinburgh Academicals.
