= Danièle Irazu =

French rugby union player

- Born: 12 December 1974 (age 51)
- Height: 1.62 m (5 ft 4 in)
- Weight: 75 kg (165 lb)

Rugby union career
- Position: Prop
International career
Years	Team	Apps	(Points)
1995–2007	France	76	(0)

Danièle Irazu (born 12 December 1974) is a former French international rugby player, native of the Basque country, and player for the France women's national rugby union team. She was part of France's women's rugby team, at the 2006 Women's Rugby World Cup.

== Rugby career ==
Irazu was an accountant in her region of origin until 2004, but managed her sports career thanks to a high-level athlete job at SNCF where she joined the "World Cup" project group in March 2007, at the Direction de la Communication, since SNCF was a first-rank partner of the 2007 Rugby World Cup.

Irazu is in charge of an initiative to encourage rugby. From 2008 to 2016, she was a member of the steering committee of the French Rugby Federation. In 2017, she was manager of the France Under-20 Women's Team. She was replaced by Hélène Ezanno in 2018.

On December 9, 2017, she was elected to the steering committee of the Ligue Régional Nouvelle-Aquitaine rugby in a list led by Michel Macary and supported by the president of the French rugby federation Bernard Laporte.

== Clubs ==
Years	Club
1992–1995	Stade Hendayais
1995–2005	Pachys d'Herm
2005–2006	Ovalie Caen
