= Annaleah Rush =

NZ international rugby union player

- Born: 15 April 1976 (age 50)
- Height: 1.71 m (5 ft 7 1/2 in)
- Weight: 72 kg (159 lb; 11 st 5 lb)

Rugby union career
- Position(s): Centre, Fullback
Amateur team(s)
Years	Team	Apps	(Points)
	Marist		(0)
Provincial / State sides
Years	Team	Apps	(Points)
1995–1999	Otago	22	(0)
2000–2001	Auckland	14	(0)
International career
Years	Team	Apps	(Points)
1996–2002	New Zealand	20	(152)
National sevens team
Years	Team		Comps
2000–2001	New Zealand		
Medal record
Representing New Zealand
Women's rugby union
Rugby World Cup
Gold medal – first place	1998 Netherlands	Team competition
Gold medal – first place	2002 Spain	Team competition

Annaleah Bodle (née Rush; born 15 April 1976) is a former New Zealand rugby union player. She was a member of New Zealand's Champion 1998 and 2002 Rugby World Cup squads.

== Rugby career ==
=== XVs ===
Rush played for the Black Ferns from 1996 to 2002. She made her test debut on 8 September 1996 against Canada at St Albert. She also competed against the United States and France who were also participants of the Canada Cup. In 1997, She played against England and, the Wallaroos.

She was part of the New Zealand side that won their first Rugby World Cup title in 1998 in the Netherlands. She scored two tries in the semi-final against England to help her side reach the final. She was the tournament's topscorer.

Rush appeared in the Triangular '99 tournament that was hosted by New Zealand which featured Canada and the United States. She also played Canada and England in the 2000 Canada Cup.

In 2001, She was selected in the Black Ferns squad that played England in two test matches in June. Her side won the first test with a narrow margin of five points. After ten years of being undefeated, they lost the second game 22–17 at Albany.

She won a second title with the Black Ferns in Spain at the 2002 Women's Rugby World Cup. The final against England was her last international appearance for New Zealand.

=== Sevens ===
She was a member of the first official New Zealand women's sevens team, who took part in the 2000 Hong Kong Sevens. She also played in the 2001 Hong Kong Women's Sevens tournament which New Zealand eventually won.

=== Coaching ===
In 2023, She coached the Cambridge High School’s 1st XV girls’ rugby team to win their Under-17 grade and claim the Vanessa Cootes Cup. She had been coaching the school's rugby for seven years.

== Personal life ==
She is the sister of former All Black and Blues Number Eight Xavier Rush. She also won the Women's Player of the Year award in 2001.
