= Vanessa Cootes =

New Zealand rugby player

- Born: 26 July 1969 (age 57)
- Height: 1.63 m (5 ft 4 in)
- Weight: 76 kg (168 lb; 12 st 0 lb)

Rugby union career
- Position: Wing
Provincial / State sides
Years	Team	Apps	(Points)
- Waikato
International career
Years	Team	Apps	(Points)
1995–2002	New Zealand	16	(215)
Medal record
Representing New Zealand
Women's rugby union
Rugby World Cup
Gold medal – first place	1998 Netherlands	Team competition
Gold medal – first place	2002 Spain	Team competition

Vanessa Cootes (born 26 July 1969) is a former New Zealand rugby union player. She played for New Zealand at an international level and for Waikato provincially. She was a member of the Black Ferns 1998 and 2002 Rugby World Cup Champion squads.

== Rugby career ==
Cootes was part of the 1998 Rugby World Cup champion squad, she scored five of the Black Ferns eight tries in the final. She also competed at the 2002 Rugby World Cup in Spain.

Cootes held the Black Ferns record for the most tries scored, with 43 tries in 16 tests, and for the most points and tries scored in a match, until Portia Woodman-Wickliffe scored her 44th test try against the USA in May 2025. She scored a record nine tries against France in 1996.

She received her Black Ferns cap in 2018.
