= Anna Richards =

New Zealand international rugby union player

Anna Richards MNZM
- Born: 3 December 1964 (age 61) Timaru, New Zealand
- Height: 1.68 m (5 ft 6 in)
- Weight: 67 kg (148 lb)

Rugby union career
- Position: First five-eighth
Provincial / State sides
Years	Team	Apps	(Points)
1989–2008	Auckland	13	(22)
1986–1988	Canterbury		
International career
Years	Team	Apps	(Points)
1990–2010	New Zealand	49	(64)
Coaching career
- Years: Team
- 2013–17: Hong Kong Women's 7s
Medal record
Representing New Zealand
Women's rugby union
Rugby World Cup
Gold medal – first place	1998 Netherlands	Team competition
Gold medal – first place	2002 Spain	Team competition
Gold medal – first place	2006 Canada	Team competition
Gold medal – first place	2010 England	Team competition

Anna Mary Richards MNZM (born 3 December 1964) is a former New Zealand rugby union player. She represented New Zealand and won four Rugby World Cups — 1998, 2002, 2006, and 2010.

== Rugby career ==
=== XVs ===
After being dropped from the Canterbury netball team an invitation from her family law lecturer, Laurie O’Reilly, who was married to then Canterbury netball coach, Kay O’Reilly, to come watch a game kickstarted her rugby career. She eventually played for the University of Canterbury side and toured America and Europe.

Richards debuted for the Black Ferns on 26 August 1990. Her test debut at the 1991 Rugby World Cup came against Canada on 6 April at Glamorgan.

In 1992, when the Black Ferns was formally recognised. She was a member of the squad that defeated Auckland 36–0 at Eden Park. She scored a try in the game.

She played 54 matches for the Black Ferns of which 49 were full internationals, she has won four Women’s Rugby World Cups before she retired in 2010.

=== Sevens ===
She was a member of the first official New Zealand women's sevens team, who took part in the 2000 Hong Kong Sevens. She captained the side again at the 2001 tournament.

=== Coaching career ===
Richards was appointed as head coach of the Hong Kong women's sevens team in 2013. She completed her coaching role at the end of 2017.

As at January 2023 she is the women's player development manager at Auckland Rugby.

== Personal life ==
Richards has a law degree and a BA. She played representative tennis and netball. In the 2005 Queen's Birthday Honours, She was appointed a Member of the New Zealand Order of Merit, for services to women's rugby.

== Hall of Fame ==
Richards was inducted into the IRB Hall of Fame on 17 November 2014.
