= Victoria Heighway =

- Born: 28 November 1980 (age 45)
- Height: 1.82 m (5 ft 11 1/2 in)
- Weight: 76 kg (168 lb; 12 st 0 lb)

Rugby union career
- Position: Lock
Provincial / State sides
| Years | Team | Apps | (Points) |
| 1997–2009 | Auckland | 19 | (5) |
International career
| Years | Team | Apps | (Points) |
| 2000–2010 | New Zealand | 32 | (10) |
Medal record
Representing New Zealand
Women's rugby union
Rugby World Cup
| Gold medal – first place | 2002 Spain | Team competition |
| Gold medal – first place | 2006 Canada | Team competition |
| Gold medal – first place | 2010 England | Team competition |

Victoria Heighway (born 28 November 1980) is a New Zealand female rugby union player. She played Lock for New Zealand internationally and represented Auckland at the provincial level.

Heighway made her Black Ferns test debut, aged 19, on 23 September 2000 against Canada at Winnipeg.

Heighway was a member of the champion 2002, 2006, and 2010 Rugby World Cup sides. She captained the Black Ferns in their tour of England in 2009. She was named New Zealand Women’s Player of the Year twice, in 2007 and 2009.
