= Jos Bergman =

- Born: 20 February 1969 (age 57)

Rugby union career
- Position: Fly-half
International career
Years	Team	Apps	(Points)
- United States

Jos Bergmann (born 20 February 1969) is a former American rugby union player. She represented the United States at the 1994 and 1998 Rugby World Cups.
