= Hannah Porter =

NZ international rugby union player

- Born: Hannah Myers; 28 September 1979 (age 47)
- Height: 1.75 m (5 ft 9 in)
- Weight: 73 kg (161 lb; 11 st 7 lb)

Rugby union career
- Position: Centre
Provincial / State sides
Years	Team	Apps	(Points)
2003	Auckland		
2000-2002	Otago		
International career
Years	Team	Apps	(Points)
2000–2008	New Zealand	22	(134)
Medal record
Women's rugby union
Representing New Zealand
Rugby World Cup
Gold medal – first place	2002 Spain	Team competition
Gold medal – first place	2006 Canada	Team competition
Sevens World Cup
Silver medal – second place	2009 Dubai	Team competition

Hannah Porter (née Myers; b. 28 September 1979) is a former female rugby union player. She represented New Zealand in fifteens and sevens rugby, and played for Auckland and Otago provincially. She was in the squad that won the 2002 and 2006 Rugby World Cups.

Porter was a member of the first official New Zealand women's sevens team who competed in the 2000 Hong Kong Sevens. She later captained the Black Ferns sevens at the 2009 Rugby World Cup Sevens in Dubai.

Porter was appointed as the Black Ferns manager at the 2010 Rugby World Cup. In 2017, She was later appointed as their campaign manager at the Rugby World Cup in Ireland.

In September 2022, Porter was confirmed as the Head of Women’s High Performance at New Zealand Rugby.
