= Svetlana Khokhlova =

- Born: 24 February 1971 (age 55)
- Height: 1.72 m (5 ft 7 1/2 in)
- Weight: 68 kg (150 lb; 10 st 10 lb)

Rugby union career
International career
Years	Team	Apps	(Points)
1994–?	Kazakhstan		(0)

Svetlana Khokhlova (born 24 February 1971) is a former Kazakh rugby union player. She competed for Kazakhstan at the 1994 and 1998 Women's Rugby World Cup's.
