= Nikita Khokhlov (footballer, born 1996) =

Russian footballer

Personal information
- Full name: Nikita Sergeyevich Khokhlov
- Date of birth: 25 April 1996 (age 30)
- Height: 1.86 m (6 ft 1 in)
- Position: Defender

Senior career*
Years	Team	Apps	(Gls)
2013–2018	FC Sokol Saratov	17	(0)
2016–2017	→ FC Dynamo Kirov (loan)	21	(2)
- * Club domestic league appearances and goals

Nikita Sergeyevich Khokhlov (Russian: Никита Сергеевич Хохлов; born 25 April 1996) is a Russian former football player.

== Club career ==
He made his debut in the Russian Professional Football League for FC Sokol Saratov on 9 September 2013 in a game against FC Tambov. He made his Russian Football National League debut for Sokol on 29 November 2015 in a game against FC Sibir Novosibirsk.
