= Elizabeth Andrew (rugby union) =

- Born: 2 November 1971 (age 55) Newcastle, New South Wales
- School: St Clare's College, Canberra

Rugby union career
- Position: Flanker
International career
Years	Team	Apps	(Points)
1994–2002	Australia	12	(0)
National sevens team
Years	Team		Comps
	Australia		4

Elizabeth Andrew (born 2 November 1971) is an Australian former rugby union player. She competed for the Wallaroos in the 1998 and 2002 Rugby World Cups.

== Rugby career ==
Andrew made her international debut for Australia in 1994 against New Zealand in Sydney. She was a member of the Wallaroos first Rugby World Cup squad in 1998 in the Netherlands.

Andrew was also named in the 2002 Rugby World Cup squad that competed in Spain. Her last appearance for the Wallaroos was in the match against Scotland, in Girona.

In 2024, She released a book titled, Wallaroo 19, it details her plight and the Wallaroos fight for recognition.
