= Tammi Wilson =

NZ dual-code rugby international player

- Born: 29 September 1973 (age 53) Christchurch, New Zealand
- Height: 1.75 m (5 ft 9 in)
- Weight: 65 kg (10 st 3 lb)

Rugby union career
- Position: Fullback
Provincial / State sides
| Years | Team | Apps | (Points) |
| | Auckland | | (0) |
International career
| Years | Team | Apps | (Points) |
| 1998–2002 | New Zealand | 16 | (193) |
National sevens team
| Years | Team | | Comps |
| 2000 | New Zealand | | |
- Rugby league career

Playing information
Representative
| Years | Team | Pld | T | G | FG | P |
|---|---|---|---|---|---|---|
| 1995 | New Zealand |
Medal record
Representing New Zealand
Women's rugby union
Rugby World Cup
| Gold medal – first place | 1998 Netherlands | Team competition |
| Gold medal – first place | 2002 Spain | Team competition |

Tammi Wilson Uluinayau (born 29 September 1973) is a New Zealand former rugby union player. She represented the New Zealand women's national rugby union team, the Black Ferns, at the 1998 and 2002 Women's Rugby World Cup.

Wilson was born in Christchurch and was the only girl in a family of two. She attended Hato Hohepa Maori Girls College and Auckland Girls' Grammar School. She has a master's degree from Auckland University of Technology. She had previously represented New Zealand in touch and Sevens and rugby league before making the Black Ferns.

Wilson was a member of the first official New Zealand women's sevens team, who took part in the 2000 Hong Kong Sevens. In 2001, she played in the two test series for the Black Ferns against England.

Wilson also played Rugby League for New Zealand in 1995, playing in the inaugural Test Match series against Australia.
