= 2002 Women's Rugby World Cup =

Rugby union event held in Spain

Spanish: Copa Mundial de Rugby Femenina 2002

Tournament details
- Host nation: Spain
- Dates: 13 – 25 May 2002
- No. of nations: 16

Final positions
- Champions: New Zealand (2nd title)
- Runner-up: England

Tournament statistics
- Matches played: 32
- Tries scored: 170 (average 5.31 per match)
- Top scorer(s): (New Zealand) Tammi Wilson (48)
- Most tries: (England) Sue Day (9)
- Points scored: 1,276 (average 39.88 per match)

The 2002 Women's Rugby World Cup was the second World Cup fully sanctioned by the sports governing body the International Rugby Board (IRB). The tournament was held in Barcelona, Spain. The format (Note: There are 16 teams at the IRB Women's World Cup 2002. They are divided into four Pools of four teams each, according to each team's seeding. For the first set of matches the highest seeded team plays the lowest seeded team whilst the two mid-seeded teams play each other. After the first round of matches the positions in each Pool are recalculated with the winners of the first matches in first and second places, and the losers in third and fourth places. In the second set of matches, the top two teams and the bottom two teams from each Pool play each other. The final Pool standings are calculated from the results of these matches to give the final four positions in each Pool. The four top teams in each of the Pools go forward to contest the World Cup title. The second placed teams from each Pool play for 5th position (the Plate), the third place teams for 9th (the Bowl), and the fourth placed teams for 13th (the Shield). The four teams in each of these groups are reseeded to decide who plays who at this stage of the tournament. The two winning teams from each of these 'semi-finals' then face each other in the 'final' whilst the losing teams play each other.From the IRB tournament guide) was the same as the previous tournament and again 16 nations competed.

For the first time a pre-tournament qualification match took place to decide Asia's second representative but other than that all competitors took part by invitation. 14 of the 16 teams taking part were the same as in 1998 but two lowest ranked European teams (Sweden and Russia) were replaced by teams from Asia (Japan) and Oceania (Samoa).

The competition was won by defending champions, New Zealand.

== Match Officials ==
In 2002 women's rugby World Cup featured five female referees including s.cortabarria from Spain,G De santis from Italy ,Nicky Inwood from new Zealand.the tournament also featured female assistant referees , including Debbie innes and Georgina perrott of England and Rachel allan of Switzerland .

Referees:

- S Cortabarria (Spain)
- G De Santis (Italy)
- Nicky Inwood (New Zealand)

== Qualifier ==
15 December 2000

Hong Kong	0–62	Japan

Aberdeen Sports Ground, Hong Kong

== Competition format ==
The format was the same as the previous tournament and again 16 nations competed. The teams were divided into four pools of four teams each, according to each team's seeding.

For the first set of matches the highest seeded team played the lowest seeded team while the two mid-seeded teams played each other.After the first round of matches the positions in each pool were recalculated with the winners of the first matches in first and second places, and the losers in third and fourth places. In the second set of matches, the top two teams and the bottom two teams from each pool played each other. The final pool standings were calculated from the results of these matches to give the final four positions in each pool.

The four top teams in each of the pools went forward to contest the World Cup title. The second placed teams from each pool play for 5th position (the Plate), the third place teams for 9th (the Bowl), and the fourth placed teams for 13th (the Shield). The four teams in each of these groups are reseeded to decide who plays who at this stage of the tournament.

The two winning teams from each of these 'semi-finals' then faced each other in the 'final', whilst the losing teams played each other. (Note: From the IRB tournament guide)

== World Cup Tournament ==
Although not strictly speaking a knock-out as – in theory – a team losing a game on Day 1 could still qualify dependent on results on Day 2, in practice this was a complex tournament that is best understood by means of the following graphics. Note that this should not be taken to imply that the draw for any round of games was predetermined – each successive round was drawn using seedings and rankings based on previous matches:

=== Cup (positions 1–4) ===
Round of 16
13 May 2002 – Pool A
Germany	0
New Zealand	117
13 May 2002 – Pool A
Australia	30
Wales	0
13 May 2002 – Pool B
United States	87
Netherlands	0
13 May 2002 – Pool B
France	31
Kazakhstan	12
13 May 2002 – Pool C
England	63
Italy	9
13 May 2002 – Pool C
Spain	62
Japan	0
13 May 2002 – Pool D
Canada	57
Ireland	0
13 May 2002 – Pool D
Scotland	13
Samoa	3

Quarter-finals
17 May 2002 – Pool A
New Zealand	36
Australia	3
17 May 2002 – Pool B
United States	9
France	21
17 May 2002 – Pool C
England	13
Spain	5
17 May 2002 – Pool D
Canada	11
Scotland	0

Semi-finals
20 May 2002 – Semi-final
New Zealand	30
France	0
20 May 2002 – Semi-final
England	53
Canada	10

Final
25 May 2002 – Final
New Zealand	19
England	9
3rd Place final
25 May 2002 – 3rd Place Final
France	41
Canada	7

=== Ranking matches 5–8 ===
Teams knocked out in the Cup quarter-finals

Semi-finals
20 May 2002
Australia	17
United States	5
20 May 2002
Spain	16
Scotland	23

Final
25 May 2002 – 5th Place Final
Australia	30
Scotland	0
7th Place Final
25 May 2002 – 7th Place Final
United States	23
Spain	5

=== Ranking matches 9–16 ===
Teams defeated in the first round of pool matches

Quarter-finals
18 May 2002 – Pool A
Germany	0
Wales	77
18 May 2002 – Pool C
Italy	30
Japan	3
18 May 2002 – Pool D
Ireland	0
Samoa	22
18 May 2002 – Pool B
Netherlands	10
Kazakhstan	37

Semi-finals
20 May 2002
Wales	35
Italy	3
20 May 2002
Samoa	14
Kazakhstan	3

Final
24 May 2002 – 9th Place Final
Wales	14
Samoa	17
11th Place Final
24 May 2002 – 11th Place Final
Italy	3
Kazakhstan	20

=== Ranking matches 13–16 ===
Teams defeated in the first round of the ranking matches for 9–16

Semi-finals
20 May 2002
Germany	0
Ireland	18
20 May 2002
Japan	37
Netherlands	3

Final
24 May 2002 – 13th Place Final
Ireland	0
Japan	18
15th Place Final
24 May 2002 – 15th Place Final
Germany	19
Netherlands	20

== Match details ==
=== Pool A ===
Pos	Team	Pld	W	D	L	PF	PA	PD	Pts	Overall ranking
1	New Zealand	2	2	0	0	153	3	+150	6	1st
2	Australia	2	1	0	1	33	36	−3	4	8th
3	Wales	2	1	0	1	77	30	+47	4	9th
4	Germany	2	0	0	2	0	194	−194	2	16th

Rules for classification: Position in each pool based on a) tournament points, b) result between sides on equal points, and c) match points difference

13 May 2002

Germany	0–117	New Zealand

Cornellà de Llobregat, Barcelona

13 May 2002

Australia	30–0	Wales

Sant Boi de Llobregat, Barcelona

17 May 2002

Germany	0–77	Wales

Girona, Barcelona

18 May 2002

Australia	3–36	New Zealand

Cornellà de Llobregat, Barcelona

=== Pool B ===
Pos	Team	Pld	W	D	L	PF	PA	PD	Pts	Overall ranking
1	France	2	2	0	0	52	21	+31	6	4th
2	United States	2	1	0	1	96	21	+75	4	5th
3	Kazakhstan	2	1	0	1	49	41	+8	4	11th
4	Netherlands	2	0	0	2	10	124	−114	2	14th

Rules for classification: Position in each pool based on a) tournament points, b) result between sides on equal points, and c) match points difference

13 May 2002

United States	87–0	Netherlands

Sant Boi de Llobregat, Barcelona

13 May 2002

France	31–12	Kazakhstan

Sant Boi de Llobregat, Barcelona

17 May 2002

Netherlands	10–37	Kazakhstan

Girona, Barcelona

18 May 2002

France	21–9	United States

Girona, Barcelona

=== Pool C ===
Pos	Team	Pld	W	D	L	PF	PA	PD	Pts	Overall ranking
1	England	2	2	0	0	76	14	+62	6	3rd
2	Spain	2	1	0	1	67	13	+54	4	6th
3	Italy	2	1	0	1	39	66	−27	4	12th
4	Japan	2	0	0	2	3	92	−89	2	15th

Rules for classification: Position in each pool based on a) tournament points, b) result between sides on equal points, and c) match points difference

13 May 2002

England	63–9	Italy

Cornellà de Llobregat, Barcelona

13 May 2002

Spain	62–0	Japan

Cornellà de Llobregat, Barcelona

17 May 2002

Italy	30–3	Japan

Sant Boi de Llobregat, Barcelona

18 May 2002

Spain	5–13	England

Cornellà de Llobregat, Barcelona

=== Pool D ===
Pos	Team	Pld	W	D	L	PF	PA	PD	Pts	Overall ranking
1	Canada	2	2	0	0	68	0	+68	6	2nd
2	Scotland	2	1	0	1	13	14	−1	4	7th
3	Samoa	2	1	0	1	25	13	+12	4	10th
4	Ireland	2	0	0	2	0	79	−79	2	13th

Rules for classification: Position in each pool based on a) tournament points, b) result between sides on equal points, and c) match points difference

13 May 2002

Canada	57–0	Ireland

Girona, Barcelona

13 May 2002

Scotland	13–3	Samoa

Girona, Barcelona

17 May 2002

Ireland	0–22	Samoa

Sant Boi de Llobregat, Barcelona

18 May 2002

Canada	11–0	Scotland

Girona, Barcelona

=== Overall ranking ===
Teams were ranked according to the following criteria:

- Most match points
- Best points difference (points scored for minus points scored against)
- Best tries difference (tries scored for minus tries scored against)
- Best penalty kick difference (penalty kicks scored for minus penalty kicks scored against)
- Most points scored for
- Most tries scored for
- Most penalty kicks scored for
- Original Tournament seeding.

This resulted in the following ranking:

Semi-finals
Pos	Team	Pld	W	D	L	PF	PA	PD	Ranking
1	New Zealand	2	2	0	0	153	3	+150	Semi-finals
2	Canada	2	2	0	0	68	0	+68	Semi-finals
3	England	2	2	0	0	76	14	+62	Semi-finals
4	France	2	2	0	0	52	21	+31	Semi-finals
5	United States	2	1	0	1	96	21	+75	5th–8th
6	Spain	2	1	0	1	67	13	+54	5th–8th
7	Scotland	2	1	0	1	13	14	−1	5th–8th
8	Australia	2	1	0	1	33	36	−3	5th–8th
9	Wales	2	1	0	1	77	30	+47	9th–12th
10	Samoa	2	1	0	1	25	13	+12	9th–12th
11	Kazakhstan	2	1	0	1	49	41	+8	9th–12th
12	Italy	2	1	0	1	39	66	−27	9th–12th
13	Ireland	2	0	0	2	0	79	−79	13th–16th
14	Japan	2	0	0	2	3	92	−89	13th–16th
15	Netherlands	2	0	0	2	10	124	−114	13th–16th
16	Germany	2	0	0	2	0	194	−194	13th–16th

== Play-offs ==
=== 13th–16th ===
20 May 2002

Germany	0–18	Ireland

Girona, Barcelona

20 May 2002

Japan	37–3	Netherlands

Girona, Barcelona

=== 9th–12th ===
20 May 2002

Wales	35–3	Italy

Sant Boi de Llobregat, Barcelona

20 May 2002

Samoa	9–3	Kazakhstan

Girona, Barcelona

=== 5th–8th ===
21 May 2002

Australia	17–5	United States
	http://www.worldrugby.org/match/11737

Girona, Barcelona

21 May 2002

Spain	16–23	Scotland

Cornellà de Llobregat, Barcelona

=== Semi-finals ===
21 May 2002

New Zealand	30–0	France

Cornellà de Llobregat, Barcelona

21 May 2002

Canada	10–53	England

Girona, Barcelona

== Finals ==
=== 15th/16th ===
24 May 2002

Germany	19–20	Netherlands

Zaragoza

=== 13th/14th ===
24 May 2002

Ireland	23–3	Japan

Girona, Barcelona

=== 11th/12th ===
24 May 2002

Italy	3–20	Kazakhstan

Sant Boi de Llobregat, Barcelona

=== 9th/10th ===
24 May 2002

Wales	14–17	Samoa

Sant Boi de Llobregat, Barcelona

=== 7th/8th ===
25 May 2002

Spain	5–23	United States

Sant Boi de Llobregat, Barcelona

=== 5th/6th ===
25 May 2002

Australia	30–0	Scotland

Girona, Barcelona

=== 3rd/4th ===
25 May 2002

France	41–7	Canada
Tries: Nathalie Amiel (2) Dalphine Plantet (2), Annabel Donnadieu, Clotilde Flaugère; Con: Estelle Sartini (2); Pen: Estelle Sartini		Try: Julie Foster; Con: Kelly McCallum

Olympic Stadium, Barcelona

=== Final ===
25 May 2002

England	9–19	New Zealand
Pen: Shelley Rae (2); Drop: Shelley Rae		Tries: Monique Hirovanaa, Cheryl Waaka; Pen: Tammi Wilson (3)

Olympic Stadium, Barcelona

2002 Women's Rugby World Cup winners

New Zealand
Second title

== Final table ==
Pos	Team	Pld	W	D	L	PF	PA	PD
1	New Zealand	4	4	0	0	202	12	+190
2	England	4	3	0	1	138	43	+95
3	France	4	3	0	1	93	58	+35
4	Canada	4	2	0	2	85	94	−9
5	Australia	4	2	0	2	63	54	+9
6	Scotland	4	2	0	2	41	53	−12
7	United States	4	3	0	1	137	26	+111
8	Spain	4	1	0	3	83	66	+17
9	Samoa	4	3	0	1	56	30	+26
10	Wales	4	2	0	2	126	50	+76
11	Kazakhstan	4	2	0	2	72	58	+14
12	Italy	4	1	0	3	45	121	−76
13	Japan	4	2	0	2	58	95	−37
14	Ireland	4	1	0	3	18	97	−79
15	Netherlands	4	1	0	3	33	180	−147
16	Germany	4	0	0	4	19	232	−213

== Sources ==
- Rugby World Cup Women’s Stats Archive
- Women's Rugby Data
