= 1998 Women's Rugby World Cup =

3rd Women's Rugby World Cup

Tournament details
- Host nation: Netherlands
- Dates: 1 – 16 May 1998
- No. of nations: 16

Final positions
- Champions: New Zealand (1st title)
- Runner-up: United States

Tournament statistics
- Matches played: 40
- Tries scored: 283 (average 7.08 per match)
- Top scorer(s): (New Zealand) Annaleah Rush (68) (Note: There is conflicting data from World Rugby and the tournament website which posted the results over the points scored by Annaleah Rush, likely over whether a try was granted to her, or given as a penalty try. This infobox defaults to the record given by the World Rugby scores.)
- Most tries: (Netherlands) Minke Docter (9)
- Points scored: 1,894 (average 47.35 per match)

The 1998 Women's Rugby World Cup was the first world cup fully sanctioned by the International Rugby Board (IRB) and the third Women's Rugby World Cup in history. The tournament took place in Amsterdam, in the Netherlands and was the first women's world cup held outside of the United Kingdom.

The tournament saw a record 16 teams compete and heightened media attention. There was no qualification process, teams taking part by invitation from the IRB. New Zealand defeated the United States 44–12 in the final.

Several matches in the tournament were filmed for television and a one-hour TV highlights programme was produced by IMG. These recordings are held as part of the IRB's World Cup Archive.

== Pool stages ==
=== Pool A ===
Team	Pld	W	D	L	PF	PA	PD	Ladder
England	2	2	0	0	147	6	+141	2nd
Canada	2	1	0	1	22	79	−57	8th
Netherlands	2	1	0	1	51	16	+35	10th
Sweden	2	0	0	2	0	119	−119	15th

1 May 1998

Netherlands	7–16	Canada

Amsterdam

2 May 1998

England	75–0	Sweden

Amsterdam

5 May 1998

Canada	6–72	England

Amsterdam

5 May 1998

Netherlands	44–0	Sweden

Amsterdam

=== Pool B ===
Team	Pld	W	D	L	PF	PA	PD	Ladder
United States	2	2	0	0	122	16	+106	3rd
Spain	2	1	0	1	44	56	−12	6th
Wales	2	1	0	1	101	35	+66	9th
Russia	2	0	0	2	7	167	−160	16th

2 May 1998

Spain	28–18	Wales

Amsterdam

2 May 1998

Russia	0–84	United States

Amsterdam

5 May 1998

Spain	16–38	United States

Amsterdam

5 May 1998

Russia	7–83	Wales

Amsterdam

=== Pool C ===
Team	Pld	W	D	L	PF	PA	PD	Ladder
New Zealand	2	2	0	0	210	6	+204	1st
Scotland	2	1	0	1	37	84	−47	7th
Italy	2	1	0	1	42	42	0	11th
Germany	2	0	0	2	11	168	−157	14th

2 May 1998

Germany	6–134	New Zealand

Amsterdam

2 May 1998

Italy	8–37	Scotland

Amsterdam

5 May 1998

New Zealand	76–0	Scotland

Amsterdam

5 May 1998

Germany	5–34	Italy

Amsterdam

=== Pool D ===
Team	Pld	W	D	L	PF	PA	PD	Ladder
France	2	2	0	0	33	14	+19	4th
Australia	2	1	0	1	29	10	+19	5th
Kazakhstan	2	1	0	1	18	29	−11	12th
Ireland	2	0	0	2	6	33	−27	13th

2 May 1998

France	23–6	Kazakhstan

Amsterdam

2 May 1998

Australia	21–0	Ireland

Amsterdam

5 May 1998

Australia	8–10	France

Amsterdam

5 May 1998

Ireland	6–12	Kazakhstan

Amsterdam

== Bowl ==
Quarter-finals
9 May – Amsterdam
Netherlands	18
Ireland	21
9 May – Amsterdam
Italy	51
Russia	7
9 May – Amsterdam
Kazakhstan	47
Sweden	5
9 May – Amsterdam
Wales	55
Germany	12

Semi-finals
12 May – Amsterdam
Ireland	20
Italy	5
12 May – Amsterdam
Kazakhstan	18
Wales	13

Final
15 May – Amsterdam
Ireland	10
Kazakhstan	26
Third place
15 May – Amsterdam
Italy	10
Wales	12

=== Quarter-finals ===
9 May 1998

Netherlands	18–21	Ireland

Amsterdam

9 May 1998

Germany	12–55	Wales

Amsterdam

9 May 1998

Kazakhstan	47–5	Sweden

Amsterdam

9 May 1998

Italy	51–7	Russia

Amsterdam

=== Semi-finals ===
12 May 1998

Ireland	20–5	Italy

Amsterdam

12 May 1998

Kazakhstan	18–13	Wales

Amsterdam

=== 11th/12th place ===
15 May 1998

Italy	10–12	Wales

Amsterdam

=== Final (9th place) ===
15 May 1998

Ireland	10–26	Kazakhstan

Amsterdam

== Shield ==
Semi-finals
12 May – Amsterdam
Netherlands	61
Russia	0
12 May – Amsterdam
Sweden	18
Germany	20

Final
15 May – Amsterdam
Netherlands	67
Germany	3
Third place
15 May – Amsterdam
Russia	3
Sweden	23

=== Semi-finals ===
12 May 1998

Netherlands	61–0	Russia

Amsterdam

12 May 1998

Germany	20–18	Sweden

Amsterdam

=== 15th/16th place ===
15 May 1998

Russia	3–23	Sweden

Amsterdam

=== Final (13th place) ===
15 May 1998

Netherlands	67–3	Germany

Amsterdam

== Cup ==
Quarter-finals
9 May – Amsterdam
England	30
Australia	13
9 May – Amsterdam
New Zealand	46
Spain	3
9 May – Amsterdam
France	7
Canada	9
9 May – Amsterdam
United States	25
Scotland	10

Semi-finals
12 May – Amsterdam
England	11
New Zealand	44
12 May – Amsterdam
Canada	6
United States	46

Final
15 May – Amsterdam
New Zealand	44
United States	12
Third place
15 May – Amsterdam
England	31
Canada	15

=== Quarter-finals ===
9 May 1998

Australia	13–30	England

Amsterdam

9 May 1998

Scotland	10–25	United States

Amsterdam

9 May 1998

Canada	9–7	France

Amsterdam

9 May 1998

New Zealand	46–3	Spain

Amsterdam

=== Semi-finals ===
12 May 1998

England	11–44	New Zealand

Amsterdam

12 May 1998

Canada	6–46	United States

Amsterdam

=== 3rd/4th place ===
16 May 1998

Canada	15–31	England

Amsterdam

=== Final ===
16 May 1998

New Zealand	44–12	United States

Amsterdam

== Plate ==
Semi-finals
12 May – Amsterdam
Australia	17
Spain	15
12 May – Amsterdam
France	7
Scotland	27

Final
15 May – Amsterdam
Australia	25
Scotland	15
Third place
15 May – Amsterdam
Spain	22
France	9

=== Semi-finals ===
12 May 1998

Australia	17–15	Spain

Amsterdam

12 May 1998

France	7–27	Scotland

Amsterdam

=== 7th/8th place ===
16 May 1998

France	9–22	Spain

Amsterdam

=== Final (5th place) ===
16 May 1998

Australia	25–15	Scotland

Amsterdam

1998 Women's Rugby World Cup winners

New Zealand
First title

== 1998 Top scorers ==
Pos.	Name	Team	Tries	Conv	Pen	Points
1	Annaleah Rush	New Zealand	5	21	2	73
2	Anne-Mieke van Waveren	Netherlands	6	13	3	65
3	Jos Bergman	United States	3	8	8	55
4	Tracey Comley	Wales	4	15	1	53
5	Tammi Wilson	New Zealand	7	8	0	51
6	Minke Docter	Netherlands	9	0	0	45
7	Nicky Brown	England	8	0	0	40
8	Realtine Shrieves	Ireland	0	2	11	38
9	Louisa Wall	New Zealand	7	0	0	35
9	Vanessa Cootes	New Zealand	7	0	0	35
11	Alfiya Tamayeva	Kazakhstan	1	11	2	33

== Sources ==
- Rugby World Cup Women’s Stats Archive
- Women's Rugby Data

== See also ==
- Women's Rugby World Cup
- Rugby World Cup Sevens
- Rugby World Cup
