= WPL All-Stars 2019 Roster =

The 2019 WPL All-Stars composed of top players from the Women's Premier League. They competed against the Collegiate All-Americans and a D1/D2 All Star team.

== Coaching staff ==
- Eastern Conference: Rosalind Chou
- Western Conference: Parisa Asgharzadeh

== WPL All-Star Staff ==
- Kitt Wagner Ruiz - Co-Program Director
- Rachel Sachs - Team Doctor
- Britney Simpson - Team Manager
- Annemarie Farrell - Team Management Director
- Kyliana Ruiz - Future WPL All-Star

== Players ==
Eastern Conference
Player	Home team	Position	Years in WPL All-Stars
Sarah Levy	New York Rugby Club	Wing, Fullback	First Year
Shamira Robles	New York Rugby Club	Fullback, Outside Center	First Year
Carly Waters	New York Rugby Club	Scrumhalf	First Year
Amber Chandu	New York Rugby Club	Prop	First Year
Andrea Villanova	New York Rugby Club	Hooker, Utility	Second year
Misha Green	New York Rugby Club	Back Row	Second year
Tahlia Brody	New York Rugby Club	Loose forward	Second year
Emilee Jalosuo	Twin Cities Amazons	Flanker	First Year
Ali Gillberg	Twin Cities Amazons	Prop, Lock	Third Year
Rachel Lentsch	Twin Cities Amazons	Scrumhalf	First Year
Chloe Jex	DC Furies	Prop, 8	First Year
Claire Stingley	Beantown RFC	Flanker, Hooker	First Year
Olivia Benzan-Daniel	Beantown RFC	Prop, Utility	First Year
Amanda Schweitzer	Beantown RFC	Flanker, Outside Center	First Year
Kathryn Treder	Beantown RFC	Hooker, Flanker	First Year
Kelli Smith	Beantown RFC	Fullback, Wing	First Year
Christina Swift	Atlanta Harlequins	Wing, Fullback	First Year
Cortney Kuehl	Atlanta Harlequins	Center, Wing	First Year
Megan Rom	Atlanta Harlequins	Prop, Hooker	Second year
Cynthia Campbell	Atlanta Harlequins	Inside Center	First Year
Corinne Heavner	Atlanta Harlequins	Flyhalf	First Year
Chi Chi Chukwueke	Atlanta Harlequins	Back Row	First Year
KB Broughton	Atlanta Harlequins	Back 3	First Year

Western Conference
Player	Home team	Position	Years in WPL All-Stars
Tiffany Tate	San Diego Surfers	Wing, Center	First Year
Julie Buescher	San Diego Surfers	8, Lock	First Year
Megan Foster	San Diego Surfers	Flyhalf, Center	Second year
Adrienne Acosta	Oregon Rugby Sports Union	Prop	Third Year
Te Awhina Ho Chee	Oregon Rugby Sports Union	8, Lock	First Year
Adriana Mendoza	Oregon Rugby Sports Union	Fullback, Wing	First Year
Melissa Polheber Finkelstein	Glendale Merlins	Prop, Lock	Second year
Jeanna Beard	Glendale Merlins	Hooker	First Year
Sam Luther	Glendale Merlins	Lock, Prop	Second year
Nichole Wanamaker	Glendale Merlins	Back 3	First Year
Amandine Chatelier	Glendale Merlins	Loose forward	First Year
Juliann Tordonato	Glendale Merlins	Center	Second year
Rachel Ehrecke	Glendale Merlins	Back row, Center	First Year
Kadie Sanford	Chicago North Shore Rugby	Prop, Flanker	First Year
Kaitlyn Kasper	Chicago North Shore Rugby	Flanker, Hooker	First Year
Kathleen Stanley	Chicago North Shore Rugby	Flyhalf, Center	First Year
Rose DiBalsamo	Chicago North Shore Rugby	Scrumhalf	First Year
Kedra Davis	Berkeley All Blues	8, Lock	First Year
Shelby Lin	Berkeley All Blues	Scrumhalf	Second year
Ceara Lafferty	Berkeley All Blues	Lock, 8	First Year
Evan Hoese	Berkeley All Blues	Wing, Center	First Year
Tyra Norlander	Berkeley All Blues	Lock, Loose forward	First Year
Serena Liu	Berkeley All Blues	Fullback, Wing	First Year
