= WPL All-Stars 2018 Roster =

In 2018, the Women's Premier League decided to split the All-Stars by conference, allowing for one Eastern Conference Team and one Western Conference Team.

== Coaching staff ==
- Eastern Conference: Rosalind Chou
- Western Conference: Kittery Wagner-Ruiz

== Players ==
Eastern Conference
Player	Home team	Years in WPL All-Stars
Shelby Lin	New York Rugby Club	First Year
Kristen Siano	New York Rugby Club	First Year
Yeja Dunn	Beantown RFC	First Year
Darian Lovelace	Atlanta Harlequins	First Year
Maggie Olney	DC Furies	Second Year
Tahlia Brody	New York Rugby Club	First Year
Gio Cruz	New York Rugby Club	First Year
Bailey Johnson	Twin Cities Amazons	First Year
Monique Compito	Atlanta Harlequins	First Year
Lauran Glover	DC Furies	First Year
Emily Jones	Beantown RFC	First Year
Alexa Scott	New York Rugby Club	First Year
Sam Luther	Beantown RFC	First Year
Misha Green	New York Rugby Club	First Year
Alycia Washington	New York Rugby Club	First Year
Megan Rom	Atlanta Harlequins	First Year
Jess Davis	Beantown RFC	First Year
Ali Gillberg	Twin Cities Amazons	Second Year
Andrea Villanova	New York Rugby Club	First Year
Kaelene Lundstrom	Twin Cities Amazons	First Year
Jenn Salomon	New York Rugby Club	First Year

Western Conference
Player	Home team	Years in WPL All-Stars
Sarah Chobot	Glendale Merlins	Second Year
Denali Graham	Glendale Merlins	First Year
Alli Hale	Glendale Merlins	First Year
Joanna Kitlinski	Glendale Merlins	First Year
Jenny Lui	Glendale Merlins	First Year
Joanna McElroy	Glendale Merlins	First Year
Kelsie O’Brien	Glendale Merlins	First Year
Kristen Shalosky	Glendale Merlins	Second Year
Hannah Stolba	Glendale Merlins	First Year
Juliann Tordonato	Glendale Merlins	First Year
Charli Jacoby	Chicago North Shore Rugby	First Year
Christiane Pheil	Chicago North Shore Rugby	First Year
Kadie Sanford	Chicago North Shore Rugby	First Year
Brittany Simunac	Chicago North Shore Rugby	First Year
Adrienne Acosta	Oregon Sports Union	Second Year
Tia Blythe	San Diego Surfers	Second Year
Megan Foster	San Diego Surfers	First Year
Matelina Maluia	San Diego Surfers	First Year
Dana Meschisi	San Diego Surfers	First Year
Kimdinh Tran	San Diego Surfers	First Year
Brittany O’Dell	Chicago North Shore Rugby	First Year
