= 2015 Women's Premier League Rugby season =

2015 Women's Premier League
- Countries: United States
- Number of teams: 8
- Champions: Glendale Raptors
- Runners-up: Berkeley All Blues
- Promoted: n/a
- Relegated: n/a
- Matches played: 32

The 2015 Women's Premier League Rugby season was the seventh season of the Women's Premier League in the United States. It began on September 12 and involved eight teams.

== Format ==
This was the first year the WPL went without promotion or relegation. The eight teams were divided into two conferences, Red and Blue, comprising four teams. They each played six conference games, one home and one away. The WPL season occurred in the fall, concurrently with the regular women's club season, with the National Championship being held in November 13–15.

For the Finals, teams were seeded based on the results of their conference during the regular season. The top four teams competed for the Cup and the bottom teams for the Bowl.

== Conference standings ==
Advanced to the Cup Semi-finals
Advanced to the Bowl Semi-finals

=== Blue Conference ===
Pos.	Team	P	W	D	L	PF	PA	Diff	Pts
1	Glendale Raptors	6	5	0	1	192	141	51	25
2	Berkeley All Blues	6	4	0	2	196	156	40	22
3	Oregon Sports Union	6	3	0	3	185	152	33	20
4	San Diego Surfers	6	0	0	6	129	253	−124	7

=== Red Conference ===
Pos.	Team	P	W	D	L	PF	PA	Diff	Pts
1	Twin Cities Amazons	6	5	1	0	255	67	188	28
2	New York Rugby Club	6	2	1	3	126	121	5	13
3	Atlanta Harlequins	6	2	1	3	67	138	−71	11
4	DC Furies	6	1	1	4	36	158	−122	7

== Matches ==
=== Week 1 ===
September 12, 2015

Glendale Raptors	58–22	San Diego Surfers

September 12, 2015

Oregon Sports Union	48–12	Berkeley All Blues

September 13, 2015

DC Furies	0–35	New York Rugby Club

September 13, 2015

Twin Cities Amazons	65–0	Atlanta Harlequins

=== Week 2 ===
September 20, 2015

Twin Cities Amazons	56–5	DC Furies

September 20, 2015

Atlanta Harlequins	10–21	New York Rugby Club

September 20, 2015

Berkeley All Blues	49–12	San Diego Surfers

September 20, 2015

Oregon Sports Union	24–27	Glendale Raptors

=== Week 3 ===
October 3, 2015

Berkeley All Blues	22–19	Glendale Raptors

October 4, 2015

New York Rugby Club	20–38	Twin Cities Amazons

October 4, 2015

Atlanta Harlequins	19–14	DC Furies

October 4, 2015

San Diego Surfers	24–27	Oregon Sports Union

=== Week 4 ===
October 10, 2015

San Diego Surfers	24–55	Berkeley All Blues

October 10, 2015

Glendale Raptors	31–26	Oregon Sports Union

October 11, 2015

New York Rugby Club	10–26	Atlanta Harlequins

October 11, 2015

DC Furies	0–38	Twin Cities Amazons

=== Week 5 ===
October 24, 2015

Glendale Raptors	28–24	Berkeley All Blues

October 24, 2015

Oregon Sports Union	35–24	San Diego Surfers

October 25, 2015

DC Furies	0–0	Atlanta Harlequins

October 25, 2015

Twin Cities Amazons	30–30	New York Rugby Club

=== Week 6 ===
October 31, 2015

Berkeley All Blues	34–25	Oregon Sports Union

October 31, 2015

San Diego Surfers	23–29	Glendale Raptors

November 1, 2015

New York Rugby Club	10–17	DC Furies

November 1, 2015

Atlanta Harlequins	12–28	Twin Cities Amazons

== Playoffs ==
=== Bowl Semi-finals ===
November 13, 2015

Atlanta Harlequins	22–54	San Diego Surfers

-

November 13, 2015

Oregon Sports Union	51–13	DC Furies

-

=== Cup Semi-finals ===
November 13, 2015

Twin Cities Amazons	23–29	Berkeley All Blues

-

November 13, 2015

Glendale Raptors	44–20	New York Rugby Club

-

=== Bowl Finals ===
==== 7th place Final ====
November 15, 2015

Atlanta Harlequins	18–5	DC Furies

==== 5th place Final ====
November 15, 2015

San Diego Surfers	29–22	Oregon Sports Union

=== Cup Finals ===
==== 3rd place Final ====
November 15, 2015

Twin Cities Amazons	24–12	New York Rugby Club

==== Grand Final ====
November 15, 2015

Glendale Raptors	26–17	Berkeley All Blues
