= 2014 Women's Premier League Rugby season =

2014 Women's Premier League
- Countries: United States
- Number of teams: 8
- Champions: Glendale Raptors
- Runners-up: Twin Cities Amazons
- Promoted: Oregon Sports Union
- Relegated: Beantown RFC
- Matches played: 32

The 2014 Women's Premier League Rugby season was the sixth season of the Women's Premier League in the United States. It began on September 13 and involved eight teams.

== Format ==
Beantown RFC were relegated in the off-season and the Oregon Sports Union became the first team to return as a member of the WPL. The eight teams were divided into two conferences, Red and Blue, comprising four teams. They each played six conference games, one home and one away. The WPL season occurred in the fall, concurrently with the regular women's club season, with the National Championship being held in November 7–9.

For the Finals, teams were seeded based on the results of their conference during the regular season. The top four teams competed for the Cup and the bottom teams for the Bowl.

== Conference standings ==
Advanced to the Cup Semifinals
Advanced to the Bowl Semifinals

=== Blue Conference ===
Pos.	Team	P	W	D	L	PF	PA	Diff	Pts
1	Glendale Raptors	6	4	0	2	243	155	88	21
2	Berkeley All Blues	6	3	0	3	131	137	-6	17
3	Oregon Sports Union	6	3	0	3	133	176	-43	17
4	San Diego Surfers	6	2	0	4	177	216	-39	13

=== Red Conference ===
Pos.	Team	P	W	D	L	PF	PA	Diff	Pts
1	Twin Cities Amazons	6	6	0	0	313	56	257	30
2	Atlanta Harlequins	6	3	0	3	152	115	37	16
3	DC Furies	6	3	0	3	99	183	-84	13
4	New York Rugby Club	6	0	0	6	44	254	-210	0

== Matches ==
=== Week 1 ===
13 September 2014

Glendale Raptors	52-14	San Diego Surfers

13 September 2014

Oregon Sports Union	17-12	Berkeley All Blues

14 September 2014

Twin Cities Amazons	38-12	Atlanta Harlequins

14 September 2014

DC Furies	25-10	New York Rugby Club

=== Week 2 ===
20 September 2014

Berkeley All Blues	22-26	San Diego Surfers

20 September 2014

Oregon Sports Union	7-64	Glendale Raptors

21 September 2014

Twin Cities Amazons	62-14	DC Furies

21 September 2014

Atlanta Harlequins	41-5	New York Rugby Club

=== Week 3 ===
27 September 2014

Berkeley All Blues	33-22	Glendale Raptors

27 September 2014

San Diego Surfers	36-39	Oregon Sports Union

28 September 2014

New York Rugby Club	17-59	Twin Cities Amazons

28 September 2014

Atlanta Harlequins	19-24	DC Furies

=== Week 4 ===
4 October 2014

Glendale Raptors	28-24	Oregon Sports Union

11 October 2014

San Diego Surfers	17-35	Berkeley All Blues

12 October 2014

DC Furies	3-63	Twin Cities Amazons

12 October 2014

New York Rugby Club	5-48	Atlanta Harlequins

=== Week 5 ===
18 October 2014

Glendale Raptors	50-17	Berkeley All Blues

18 October 2014

Oregon Sports Union	41-24	San Diego Surfers

19 October 2014

DC Furies	7-22	Atlanta Harlequins

19 October 2014

Twin Cities Amazons	55-0	New York Rugby Club

=== Week 6 ===
25 October 2014

Berkeley All Blues	12-5	Oregon Sports Union

26 October 2014

Atlanta Harlequins	10-36	Twin Cities Amazons

26 October 2014

New York Rugby Club	7-26	DC Furies

26 October 2014

Glendale Raptors	60-27	San Diego Surfers

== Playoffs ==
=== Bowl Semifinals ===
7 November 2014

San Diego Surfers	32-3	DC Furies

-

7 November 2014

New York Rugby Club	22-37	Oregon Sports Union

-

=== Cup Semifinals ===
7 November 2014

Berkeley All Blues	19-22	Twin Cities Amazons

-

7 November 2014

Glendale Raptors	FORFEIT BY ATLANTA	Atlanta Harlequins

-

=== Bowl Finals ===
==== 7th Place Final ====
9 November 2014

DC Furies	27-13	New York Rugby Club

==== 5th Place Final ====
9 November 2014

San Diego Surfers	29-14	Oregon Sports Union

=== Cup Finals ===
==== 3rd Place Final ====
9 November 2014

Berkeley All Blues	20-15	Atlanta Harlequins

==== Grand Final ====
9 November 2014

Twin Cities Amazons	15-16	Glendale Raptors
