= 2012 Women's Premier League Rugby season =

2012 Women's Premier League
- Countries: United States
- Number of teams: 8
- Champions: Berkeley All Blues
- Runners-up: Glendale Raptors
- Promoted: Glendale Raptors
- Relegated: Minnesota Valkyries
- Matches played: 32

The 2012 Women's Premier League Rugby season was the fourth season of the Women's Premier League in the United States. It began on September 8 and involved eight teams.

== Format ==
The Minnesota Valkyries were relegated in the off-season and the Glendale Raptors had their first year as a part of the WPL. The eight teams were divided into two conferences, Red and Blue, comprising four teams. They each played six conference games, one home and one away. The WPL season occurred in the fall, concurrently with the regular women's club season, with the National Championship being held in November 9–11.

For the Finals, teams were seeded based on the results of their conference during the regular season. The top four teams competed for the Cup and the bottom teams for the Bowl.

== Conference standings ==
Advanced to the Cup Semifinals
Advanced to the Bowl Semifinals

=== Blue Conference ===
Pos.	Team	P	W	D	L	PF	PA	Diff	Pts
1	Twin Cities Amazons	6	6	0	0	397	52	345	30
2	Beantown RFC	6	4	0	2	207	98	109	21
3	DC Furies	6	1	0	5	118	289	-171	7
4	Keystone Rugby Club	6	1	0	5	72	355	-283	5

=== Red Conference ===
Pos.	Team	P	W	D	L	PF	PA	Diff	Pts
1	Glendale Raptors	6	5	0	1	161	119	42	23
2	Berkeley All Blues	6	4	0	2	136	93	43	19
3	San Diego Surfers	6	2	0	4	134	102	32	12
4	New York Rugby Club	6	1	0	5	85	202	-117	6

== Matches ==
=== Week 1 ===
8 September 2012

Twin Cities Amazons	38-14	Beantown RFC

8 September 2012

DC Furies	82-0	Keystone Rugby Club

8 September 2012

Berkeley All Blues	20-17	San Diego Surfers

9 September 2012

Glendale Raptors	29-22	New York Rugby Club

=== Week 2 ===
15 September 2012

San Diego Surfers	20-21	Glendale Raptors

16 September 2012

Keystone Rugby Club	12-75	Twin Cities Amazons

16 September 2012

Beantown RFC	57-0	DC Furies

16 September 2012

New York Rugby Club	25-5	Berkeley All Blues

=== Week 3 ===
29 September 2012

Keystone Rugby Club	0-47	Beantown RFC

29 September 2012

Glendale Raptors	27-32	Berkeley All Blues

30 September 2012

DC Furies	0-65	Twin Cities Amazons

30 September 2012

New York Rugby Club	19-45	San Diego Surfers

=== Week 4 ===
6 October 2012

Berkeley All Blues	48-0	New York Rugby Club

6 October 2012

Glendale Raptors	24-13	San Diego Surfers

7 October 2012

Twin Cities Amazons	93-0	Keystone Rugby Club

7 October 2012

DC Furies	7-34	Beantown RFC

=== Week 5 ===
20 October 2012

Keystone Rugby Club	31-29	DC Furies

20 October 2012

San Diego Surfers	7-17	Berkeley All Blues

21 October 2012

Beantown RFC	26-36	Twin Cities Amazons

21 October 2012

New York Rugby Club	18-43	Glendale Raptors

=== Week 6 ===
27 October 2012

Berkeley All Blues	14-17	Glendale Raptors

28 October 2012

Twin Cities Amazons	85-0	DC Furies

28 October 2012

Beantown RFC	29-17	Keystone Rugby Club

28 October 2012

San Diego Surfers	31-5	New York Rugby Club

== Playoffs ==
=== Bowl Semifinals ===
9 November 2012

DC Furies	17-22	New York Rugby Club

-

9 November 2012

San Diego Surfers	47-0	Keystone Rugby Club

-

=== Cup Semifinals ===
9 November 2012

Twin Cities Amazons	26-46	Berkeley All Blues

-

9 November 2012

Glendale Raptors	21-15	Beantown RFC

-

=== Bowl Finals ===
==== 7th Place Final ====
11 November 2012

DC Furies	46-18	Keystone Rugby Club

==== 5th Place Final ====
11 November 2012

New York Rugby Club	7-22	San Diego Surfers

=== Cup Finals ===
==== 3rd Place Final ====
11 November 2012

Twin Cities Amazons	19-34	Beantown RFC

==== Grand Final ====
11 November 2012

Berkeley All Blues	39-5	Glendale Raptors
