= 2013 Women's Premier League Rugby season =

2013 Women's Premier League
- Countries: United States
- Number of teams: 8
- Champions: Twin Cities Amazons
- Runners-up: Berkeley All Blues
- Promoted: Atlanta Harlequins
- Relegated: Keystone Rugby Club
- Matches played: 32

The 2013 Women's Premier League Rugby season was the fifth season of the Women's Premier League in the United States. It began on September 8 and involved eight teams.

== Format ==
The Keystone Rugby Club were relegated in the off-season and the Atlanta Harlequins had their first year as a part of the WPL. The eight teams were divided into two conferences, Red and Blue, comprising four teams. They each played six conference games, one home and one away. The WPL season occurred in the fall, concurrently with the regular women's club season, with the National Championship being held in November 8–10.

For the Finals, teams were seeded based on the results of their conference during the regular season. The top four teams competed for the Cup and the bottom teams for the Bowl.

== Conference standings ==
Advanced to the Cup Semifinals
Advanced to the Bowl Semifinals

=== Blue Conference ===
Pos.	Team	P	W	D	L	PF	PA	Diff	Pts
1	Glendale Raptors	6	6	0	0	294	106	188	30
2	Beantown RFC	6	3	0	3	178	123	55	17
3	New York Rugby Club	6	3	0	3	89	163	-74	14
4	DC Furies	6	0	0	6	56	225	-169	0

=== Red Conference ===
Pos.	Team	P	W	D	L	PF	PA	Diff	Pts
1	Berkeley All Blues	6	6	0	0	303	53	250	29
2	Twin Cities Amazons	6	4	0	2	221	114	107	21
3	San Diego Surfers	6	1	0	5	79	229	-150	5
4	Atlanta Harlequins	6	1	0	5	80	267	-187	5

== Matches ==
=== Week 1 ===
8 September 2013

Twin Cities Amazons	62-0	San Diego Surfers

8 September 2013

New York Rugby Club	15-27	DC Furies

8 September 2013

Atlanta Harlequins	10-29	Berkeley All Blues

8 September 2013

Beantown RFC	36-48	Glendale Raptors

=== Week 2 ===
14 September 2013

Glendale Raptors	29-5	DC Furies

15 September 2013

San Diego Surfers	27-5	Atlanta Harlequins

15 September 2013

Berkeley All Blues	21-22	Twin Cities Amazons

15 September 2013

New York Rugby Club	8-37	Beantown RFC

=== Week 3 ===
28 September 2013

Berkeley All Blues	63-5	San Diego Surfers

29 September 2013

Atlanta Harlequins	5-47	Twin Cities Amazons

29 September 2013

Glendale Raptors	52-5	New York Rugby Club

29 September 2013

DC Furies	19-12	Beantown RFC

=== Week 4 ===
5 October 2013

DC Furies	19-61	Glendale Raptors

6 October 2013

Atlanta Harlequins	45-12	San Diego Surfers

6 October 2013

Twin Cities Amazons	46-8	Berkeley All Blues

6 October 2013

Beantown RFC	34-0	New York Rugby Club

=== Week 5 ===
19 October 2013

Berkeley All Blues	44-14	Atlanta Harlequins

20 October 2013

San Diego Surfers	19-56	Twin Cities Amazons

20 October 2013

New York Rugby Club	21-56	Glendale Raptors

21 October 2013

Beantown RFC	39-0	DC Furies

=== Week 6 ===
26 October 2013

Glendale Raptors	48-20	Beantown RFC

27 October 2013

Twin Cities Amazons	70-0	Atlanta Harlequins

27 October 2013

San Diego Surfers	15-56	Berkeley All Blues

27 October 2013

DC Furies	19-7	New York Rugby Club

== Playoffs ==
=== Bowl Semifinals ===
8 November 2013

Atlanta Harlequins	22-14	New York Rugby Club

-

8 November 2013

San Diego Surfers	20-17	DC Furies

-

=== Cup Semifinals ===
8 November 2013

Twin Cities Amazons	46-10	Beantown RFC

-

8 November 2013

Glendale Raptors	10-27	Berkeley All Blues

-

=== Bowl Finals ===
==== 7th Place Final ====
10 November 2013

New York Rugby Club	32-10	DC Furies

==== 5th Place Final ====
10 November 2013

Atlanta Harlequins	24-12	San Diego Surfers

=== Cup Finals ===
==== 3rd Place Final ====
10 November 2013

Beantown RFC	12-17	Glendale Raptors

==== Grand Final ====
10 November 2013

Twin Cities Amazons	25-12	Berkeley All Blues
