= WPL All-Stars 2017 Roster =

The 2017 WPL All-Stars were the inaugural All-Star team for the Women's Premier League. There were no players from the Berkeley All Blues on the roster in 2017.

== Coaching staff ==
- James English - New York Rugby Club
- Beckett Royce - Oregon Rugby Sports Union

== Players ==
| Player | Home team |
|---|---|
| Evi Ashenbrucker | New York Rugby Club |
| Ayden Bain | New York Rugby Club |
| Tia Blythe | San Diego Surfers |
| Sarah Chobot | Glendale Raptors |
| Maggie Craig | Atlanta Harlequins |
| San Juanita Fetuuaho | Oregon Rugby Sports Union |
| Ali Gillberg | Twin Cities Amazons |
| Paris Hart | Oregon Rugby Sports Union |
| Rachel Johnson | Oregon Rugby Sports Union |
| Phaidra Knight | New York Rugby Club |
| Molly Luft | Oregon Rugby Sports Union |
| Claire Lundy | Oregon Rugby Sports Union |
| Emily Magee | New York Rugby Club |
| Candace Mahoney-Watson | Oregon Rugby Sports Union |
| Dana Meschisi | San Diego Surfers |
| Maggie Olney | DC Furies |
| Melissa Polheber | Glendale Raptors |
| Kyla Roth | San Diego Surfers |
| Beckett Royce (Reserve) | Oregon Rugby Sports Union |
| Brooke Saunders | New York Rugby Club |
| Kristen Shalosky | Glendale Raptors |
| Christen Suda | Glendale Raptors |
