= Records and statistics of the Women's Rugby World Cup =

Rugby World Cup records have been accumulating since the first Women's Rugby World Cup tournament was held in 1991, though these have only been officially sanctioned since 1998, with retroactive acknowledgement given to the two prior tournaments in 2009.

== Tournaments ==
Ed.	Year	Host	First place game			Third place game			Num. teams
Ed.	Year	Host	(gold) Champion	Score	(silver) Runner-up	(bronze) Third	Score	Fourth	Num. teams
1	1991	Wales	United States	19–6; Cardiff Arms Park, Cardiff	England	France	Shared	New Zealand	12
2	1994	Scotland	England	38–23; Edinburgh Academicals, Edinburgh	United States	France	27–0; Edinburgh Academicals, Edinburgh	Wales	12
3	1998	Netherlands	New Zealand	44–12; NRCA Stadium, Amsterdam	United States	England	31–15; NRCA Stadium, Amsterdam	Canada	16
4	2002	Spain	New Zealand	19–9; Olympic Stadium, Barcelona	England	France	41–7; Olympic Stadium, Barcelona	Canada	16
5	2006	Canada	New Zealand	25–17; Commonwealth Stadium, Edmonton	England	France	17–8; Commonwealth Stadium, Edmonton	Canada	12
6	2010	England	New Zealand	13–10; Twickenham Stoop, London	England	Australia	22–8; Twickenham Stoop, London	France	12
7	2014	France	England	21–9; Stade Jean-Bouin, Paris	Canada	France	25–18; Stade Jean-Bouin, Paris	Ireland	12
8	2017	Ireland	New Zealand	41–32; Ravenhill Stadium, Belfast	England	France	31–23; Ravenhill Stadium, Belfast	United States	12
9	2021	New Zealand	New Zealand	34–31; Eden Park, Auckland	England	France	36–0; Eden Park, Auckland	Canada	12
10	2025	England	England	33–13; Twickenham Stadium, London	Canada	New Zealand	42–26; Twickenham Stadium, London	France	16
11	2029	Australia	To be determined			To be determined			16
12	2033	United States	To be determined			To be determined			16

== Team records ==
=== Team summaries ===
Team	Champions	Runners-up	Third place	Fourth place	Total top 4
New Zealand	6 (1998, 2002, 2006, 2010, 2017, 2021)	–	1 (2025)	1 (1991)	8
England	3 (1994, 2014, 2025)	6 (1991, 2002, 2006, 2010, 2017, 2021)	1 (1998)	–	10
United States	1 (1991)	2 (1994, 1998)	–	1 (2017)	4
Canada	–	2 (2014, 2025)	–	4 (1998, 2002, 2006, 2021)	6
France	–	–	7 (1991, 1994, 2002, 2006, 2014, 2017, 2021)	2 (2010, 2025)	9
Australia			1 (2010)		1
Wales	–	–	–	1 (1994)	1
Ireland	–	–	–	1 (2014)	1

=== Titles ===
Most titles won
Titles	Team	Tournaments
6	New Zealand	1998, 2002, 2006, 2010, 2017, 2021
3	England	1994, 2014, 2025
1	United States	1991

=== Tournament win rate ===
Win rate	Team
60%	New Zealand
30%	England
10%	United States

=== Most semi-finals ===
App	Team	Tournaments
10	England	1991, 1994, 1998, 2002, 2006, 2010, 2014, 2017, 2021, 2025
9	France	1991, 1994, 2002, 2006, 2010, 2014, 2017, 2021, 2025
8	New Zealand	1991, 1998, 2002, 2006, 2010, 2017, 2021, 2025
6	Canada	1998, 2002, 2006, 2014, 2021, 2025
4	United States	1991, 1994, 1998, 2017

=== Participating nations ===
Team	1991 (Wales)	1994 (Scotland)	1998 (Netherlands)	2002 (Spain)	2006 (Canada)	2010 (England)	2014 (France)	2017 (Ireland)	2021 (New Zealand)	2025 (England)	2029 (Australia)	2033 (United States)
Australia	–	–	5th	7th	7th	3rd	7th	6th	6th	8th	Q	
Brazil	–	–	–	–	–	–	–	–	e	15th		
Canada	5th	6th	4th	4th	4th	6th	2nd	5th	4th	2nd	Q	
England	2nd	1st	3rd	2nd	2nd	2nd	1st	2nd	2nd	1st	Q	
Fiji	–	–	–	–	–	w	–	e	9th	12th		
France	3rd	3rd	8th	3rd	3rd	4th	3rd	3rd	3rd	4th	Q	
Germany	–	w	14th	16th	–	e	–	–	–	–		
Hong Kong	–	–	–	e	e	e	e	12th	w	e		
Ireland	–	7th	10th	14th	8th	7th	4th	8th	e	5th		
Italy	8th	w	12th	12th	–	e	e	9th	5th	10th		
Japan	11th	8th	–	13th	e	e	e	11th	12th	11th		
Kazakhstan	–	9th	9th	11th	11th	11th	12th	–	e	e		
Netherlands	7th	w	13th	15th	–	e	e	e	e	e		
New Zealand	3rd	w	1st	1st	1st	1st	5th	1st	1st	3rd	Q	
Russia	11th (Note: as Soviet Union)	11th	16th	–	–	e	e	e	e	–		
Samoa	–	–	–	9th	10th	e	11th	–	w	16th		
Scotland	–	5th	6th	6th	6th	8th	e	e	10th	7th		
South Africa	–	–	–	–	12th	10th	10th	–	11th	6th		
Spain	6th	w (Note: replaced by Scottish Students)	7th	8th	9th	e	9th	10th	e	14th		
Sweden	10th	10th	15th	–	–	12th	e	–	–	–		
United States	1st	2nd	2nd	5th	5th	5th	6th	4th	7th	9th		Q
Wales	9th	4th	11th	10th	–	9th	8th	7th	8th	13th		

Q = nation qualified for final tournament not yet played
w = nation withdrew from (final) tournament
e = nation eliminated in qualifying stage and did not reach final tournament
– = nation did not enter competition

=== Most appearances ===
App	Team(s)
10	Canada, United States, England, France
9	Wales, New Zealand
8	Ireland, Australia
7	Spain, Scotland

- 4 teams have appeared in every World Cup: Canada, England, France and the United States.
- A number of teams withdrew from the 1994 competition after the IRB (now World Rugby) withdrew support, including hosts Netherlands, New Zealand, Spain, Italy, and Germany. Further, the dissolution of the USSR led to separate Kazakhstan and Russian sides participating.

=== Points ===
Most overall points by teams using pool scoring system
Pool points	Team	Pld	W	D	L	PF	PA	PD	W%	TB	LB
204	England	50	42	1	7	1,883	522	+1,361	84.00	32	2
203	New Zealand	45	41	0	4	2,057	424	+1,633	91.11	37	2
163	France	50	34	0	16	1,393	600	+793	68.00	23	4
152	Canada	51	30	2	19	1,322	813	+509	58.82	24	4
132	United States	45	27	1	17	1,404	781	+623	60.00	21	1

Last updated: 11 November 2026

Most points by a team in a single match, and winning margin
Points	Team	Opponent	Score	Winning Margin	Tournament
134	New Zealand	Germany	134–6	128	1998
121	United States	Japan	121-0	121	1994
121	New Zealand	Hong Kong	121-0	121	2017
117	New Zealand	Germany	117-0	117	2002
111	United States	Sweden	111-0	111	1994

== Player records ==
=== Points ===
Most overall points
Rank	Name	Team	Points	Tries	Con.	Pen.	Drop	Tournaments
1	Emily Scarratt	England	175	8	39	19	0	2010, 2014, 2017, 2021,2025
2	Kelly Brazier	New Zealand	115	10	25	5	0	2010, 2014, 2017,
3	Magali Harvey	Canada	112	10	19	8	0	2014, 2017
4	Portia Woodman-Wickliffe	New Zealand	110	22	0	0	0	2017, 2021, 2025
5	Tammi Wilson	New Zealand	99	10	14	7	0	1998, 2002

Key: Con = Conversions. Pen = Penalties. Drop = Drop goals.

Most points in one tournament
Rank	Name	Team	Points	Tournament
1	Emily Scarratt	England	70	2014
2	Braxton Sorensen-McGee	New Zealand	69	2025
3	Annaleah Rush*	New Zealand	68	1998
4	Anne-Mieke van Waveren	Netherlands	65	1998
4	Portia Woodman	New Zealand	65	2017

* There exists a conflict in World Rugby points totals for the 1998 tournament and the tournament website suggesting 73 points for Annaleah Rush. This table defers to the World Rugby total.

Most points in a match by a player
Rank	Name	Team	Opponent	Points	Tournament
1	Magali Harvey	Canada	Hong Kong	41	2017
2	Portia Woodman	New Zealand	Hong Kong	40	2017
3	Kendra Cocksedge	New Zealand	Hong Kong	31	2017
3	Amy Westerman	United States	Japan	31	1994
5	Krista McFarren	United States	Sweden	30	1994
5	Tammi Wilson	New Zealand	Germany	30	1998
5	Julia Schell	Canada	Fiji	30	2025

=== Appearances ===
Most appearances
Rank	Name	Team	Appearances	Tournaments
1	Gillian Florence	Canada	23	1994–2010
2	Donna Kennedy	Scotland	22	1994–2010
2	Anna Richards	New Zealand	22	1998–2010
2	Svetlana Karatygina	Kazakhstan	22	1998–2014
2	Karen Paquin	Canada	22	2010-2025

=== Tries ===
Most overall tries
Rank	Name	Team	Tries	Tournaments
1	Portia Woodman-Wickliffe	New Zealand	22	2017–2025
2	Sue Day	England	19	1998–2006
3	Patty Jervey	United States	16	1991–2002
3	Jennifer Crawford	United States	16	1991–1998
5	Nicola Crawford	England	15	1998–2006

Most tries in one tournament
Rank	Name	Team	Points	Tournament
1	Portia Woodman	New Zealand	13	2017
2	Braxton Sorensen-McGee	New Zealand	11	2025
3	Jennifer Crawford	United States	10	1994
4	Sue Day	England	9	2002
4	Minke Docter	Netherlands	9	1998

Most tries in a match by a player
Rank	Name	Team	Opponent	Tries	Tournament
1	Portia Woodman	New Zealand	Hong Kong	8	2017
2	Julia Schell	Canada	Fiji	6	2025
2	Krista McFarren	United States	Sweden	6	1994
3	Magali Harvey	Canada	Hong Kong	5	2017
3	Maria Gallo	Canada	Spain	5	2006
3	Vanessa Cootes	New Zealand	Germany	5	2002
3	Patty Jervey	United States	Netherlands	5	2002
3	Sue Day	England	Italy	5	2002
3	Vanessa Cootes	New Zealand	United States	5	1998
3	Nicola Crawford	England	Sweden	5	1998
3	Pamela Irby	United States	Sweden	5	1994
3	Amy Westerman	United States	Japan	5	1994
3	Patty Jervey	United States	Japan	5	1994

=== Conversions ===
Most overall conversions
Rank	Name	Team	Conversions	Tournaments
1	Emily Scarratt	England	39	2010–2021
2	Renee Holmes	New Zealand	30	2021-2025
3	Sophie de Goede	Canada	29	2021-2025
4	Kendra Cocksedge	New Zealand	28	2010–2021
5	Zoe Harrison	England	27	2021-2025

Most conversions in one tournament
Rank	Name	Team	Conversions	Tournaments
1	Kendra Cocksedge	New Zealand	23	2017
2	Annaleah Rush	New Zealand	21	1998
2	Zoe Harrison	England	21	2025
4	Sophie de Goede	Canada	20	2025
5	Renee Holmes	New Zealand	19	2025

=== Penalty goals ===
Most overall penalties
Rank	Name	Team	Penalties	Tournaments
1	Emily Scarratt	England	19	2010–2021
2	Realtine Shrieves	Ireland	14	1994–1998
3	Jos Bergman	United States	11	1994–1998
4	Moira Shiels	Canada	10	1998–2002
5	Ashleigh Hewson	Australia	9	2010–2017
5	Paula Chalmers	Scotland	9	1998–2006

Most penalties in one tournament
Rank	Name	Team	Penalties	Tournament
1	Realtine Shrieves	Ireland	11	1998
2	Emily Scarratt	England	10	2014
3	Jos Bergman	United States	8	1998
3	Moira Shiels	Canada	8	1998
3	Ashleigh Hewson	Australia	8	2014

=== Drop goals ===
Only 5 drop goals have been recorded at Women's Rugby World Cups:

Most overall drop goals
Rank	Name	Team	Drop goals	Tournament
1	Carla Negri	Italy	1	1991
1	Amanda Bennett	Wales	1	1991
1	Shelley Rae	England	1	2002
1	Paula Chalmers	Scotland	1	2006
1	Elinor Snowsill	Wales	1	2014

== See also ==
- List of rugby union playing countries
- List of Women's Rugby World Cup finals
- Women's Rugby World Cup

== Sources ==
- Rugby World Cup Women's Stats Archive
