= 2016 Women's Premier League Rugby season =

2016 Women's Premier League
- Countries: United States
- Number of teams: 8
- Champions: San Diego Surfers
- Runners-up: Glendale Raptors
- Promoted: n/a
- Relegated: n/a
- Matches played: 32

The 2016 Women's Premier League Rugby season was the eighth season of the Women's Premier League in the United States. It began on September 10 and involved eight teams.

== Format ==
This was the second year that the WPL went without promotion or relegation. The eight teams were divided into two conferences, Red and Blue, comprising four teams. They each played six conference games, one home and one away. The WPL season occurred in the fall, concurrently with the regular women's club season, with the national championship being held in November 11–13.

For the finals, teams were seeded based on the results of their conference during the regular season. The top four teams competed for the cup and the bottom teams for the bowl.

== Conference standings ==
Advanced to the cup semi-finals
Advanced to the bowl semi-finals

=== Blue Conference ===
Pos.	Team	P	W	D	L	PF	PA	Diff	Pts
1	San Diego Surfers	6	5	0	1	320	74	246	27
2	Glendale Raptors	6	5	0	1	232	103	129	25
3	Oregon Sports Union	6	2	0	4	102	186	−84	10
4	Berkeley All Blues	6	0	0	6	43	334	−291	0

=== Red Conference ===
Pos.	Team	P	W	D	L	PF	PA	Diff	Pts
1	New York Rugby Club	6	6	0	0	274	60	214	30
2	Twin Cities Amazons	6	4	0	2	220	157	63	20
3	Atlanta Harlequins	6	2	0	4	126	130	−4	10
4	DC Furies	6	0	0	6	38	311	−273	0

== Matches ==
=== Week 1 ===
September 10, 2016

DC Furies	0–48	New York Rugby Club

September 10, 2016

Oregon Sports Union	34–12	Berkeley All Blues

September 10, 2016

Glendale Raptors	28–26	San Diego Surfers

September 11, 2016

Twin Cities Amazons	38–17	Atlanta Harlequins

=== Week 2 ===
September 17, 2016

Berkeley All Blues	7–69	San Diego Surfers

September 18, 2016

Twin Cities Amazons	50–12	DC Furies

September 18, 2016

New York Rugby Club	24–16	Atlanta Harlequins

September 18, 2016

Oregon Sports Union	10–22	Glendale Raptors

=== Week 3 ===
September 24, 2016

Berkeley All Blues	0–44	Glendale Raptors

September 24, 2016

San Diego Surfers	49–17	Oregon Sports Union

September 24, 2016

Atlanta Harlequins	52–19	DC Furies

September 25, 2016

Twin Cities Amazons	15–42	New York Rugby Club

=== Week 4 ===
October 8, 2016

San Diego Surfers	86–7	Berkeley All Blues

October 8, 2016

Glendale Raptors	46–17	Oregon Sports Union

October 9, 2016

DC Furies	7–75	Twin Cities Amazons

October 9, 2016

Atlanta Harlequins	5–31	New York Rugby Club

=== Week 5 ===
October 15, 2016

Glendale Raptors	77–5	Berkeley All Blues

October 16, 2016

DC Furies	0–19	Atlanta Harlequins

October 16, 2016

New York Rugby Club	62–24	Twin Cities Amazons

October 22, 2016

Oregon Sports Union	0–45	San Diego Surfers

=== Week 6 ===
October 29, 2016

San Diego Surfers	45–15	Glendale Raptors

October 29, 2016

Berkeley All Blues	12–24	Oregon Sports Union

October 30, 2016

Atlanta Harlequins	17–18	Twin Cities Amazons

October 30, 2016

New York Rugby Club	67–0	DC Furies

== Playoffs ==
=== Bowl Semi-finals ===
November 11, 2016

Berkeley All Blues	17–26	Atlanta Harlequins

-

November 11, 2016

Oregon Sports Union	37–5	DC Furies

-

=== Cup Semi-finals ===
November 11, 2016

Glendale Raptors	37–13	New York Rugby Club

-

November 11, 2016

San Diego Surfers	36–8	Twin Cities Amazons

-

=== Bowl Finals ===
==== 7th place Final ====
November 13, 2016

Berkeley All Blues	48–5	DC Furies

==== 5th place Final ====
November 13, 2016

Atlanta Harlequins	10–15	Oregon Sports Union

=== Cup Finals ===
==== 3rd place Final ====
November 13, 2016

New York Rugby Club	29–10	Twin Cities Amazons

==== Grand Final ====
November 13, 2016

Glendale Raptors	16–26	San Diego Surfers
