= 2017 Women's Premier League Rugby season =

9th season of the Women's Premier League

2017 Women's Premier League
- Countries: United States
- Number of teams: 10
- Champions: New York Rugby Club
- Runners-up: Glendale Merlins
- Promoted: Chicago North Shore Rugby & Beantown RFC
- Relegated: n/a
- Matches played: 50

The 2017 Women's Premier League Rugby season was the ninth season of the Women's Premier League in the United States. It began on September 2 and involved 10 teams.

== Format ==
For the first time, the WPL raised its numbers from eight teams to ten teams with Chicago North Shore Rugby and Beantown RFC joining the league. This was also the first year the Glendale Raptors changed their names to the Glendale Merlins due to the Glendale Raptors name being used by the newly formed Major League Rugby team.

The ten teams were divided into two conferences, Red and Blue, comprising five teams. They each played eight conference games, one home and one away, with two bye weeks. The WPL season occurred in the fall, concurrently with the regular women's club season, with the National Championship being held in November 10–12.

For the Finals, teams were seeded based on the results of their conference during the regular season. The top four teams competed for the Cup and the bottom six teams for the Bowl.

== Conference standings ==
Advanced to the Cup Semi-finals
Advanced to the Bowl Semi-finals

=== Blue Conference ===
Pos.	Team	P	W	D	L	PF	PA	Diff	Pts
1	Glendale Merlins	8	7	1	0	197	133	64	35
2	San Diego Surfers	8	5	0	3	201	139	62	24
3	Berkeley All Blues	8	4	0	4	233	178	55	22
4	Oregon Sports Union	8	2	0	6	162	259	−97	13
5	Chicago North Shore Rugby	8	1	1	6	99	183	−84	10

=== Red Conference ===
Pos.	Team	P	W	D	L	PF	PA	Diff	Pts
1	New York Rugby Club	8	8	0	0	339	105	234	39
2	Beantown RFC	8	6	0	2	186	156	30	28
3	Twin Cities Amazons	8	4	0	4	226	182	44	21
4	Atlanta Harlequins	8	2	0	6	117	174	−57	12
5	DC Furies	8	0	0	8	58	309	−251	0

== Matches ==
=== Week 1 ===
2 September 2017

Beantown RFC	39–22	Atlanta Harlequins

2 September 2017

Berkeley All Blues	26–27	Glendale Merlins

3 September 2017

Twin Cities Amazons	48–19	DC Furies

=== Week 2 ===
9 September 2017

Berkeley All Blues	32–10	Oregon Sports Union

9 September 2017

Glendale Merlins	20–6	Chicago North Shore Rugby

10 September 2017

Twin Cities Amazons	26–12	Atlanta Harlequins

10 September 2017

Beantown RFC	19–43	New York Rugby Club

=== Week 3 ===
16 September 2017

DC Furies	5–17	Beantown RFC

16 September 2017

San Diego Surfers	15–21	Glendale Merlins

16 September 2017

Oregon Sports Union	24–17	Chicago North Shore Rugby

16 September 2017

Atlanta Harlequins	0–21	New York Rugby Club

=== Week 4 ===
23 September 2017

San Diego Surfers	42–27	Oregon Sports Union

24 September 2017

Chicago North Shore Rugby	29–17	Berkeley All Blues

24 September 2017

Atlanta Harlequins	35–7	DC Furies

24 September 2017

Twin Cities Amazons	41–53	New York Rugby Club

=== Week 5 ===
30 September 2017

Berkeley All Blues	34–15	San Diego Surfers

30 September 2017

Glendale Merlins	32–17	Oregon Sports Union

1 October 2017

New York Rugby Club	68–0	DC Furies

1 October 2017

Beantown RFC	27–17	Twin Cities Amazons

=== Week 6 ===
7 October 2017

Chicago North Shore Rugby	0–35	San Diego Surfers

7 October 2017

Glendale Merlins	29–14	Berkeley All Blues

8 October 2017

Atlanta Harlequins	8–15	Beantown RFC

8 October 2017

DC Furies	7–36	Twin Cities Amazons

8 October 2017

Chicago North Shore Rugby	8–12	San Diego Surfers

=== Week 7 ===
14 October 2017

Chicago North Shore Rugby	10–10	Glendale Merlins

15 October 2017

Atlanta Harlequins	3–25	Twin Cities Amazons

15 October 2017

Beantown RFC	8–38	New York Rugby Club

15 October 2017

Oregon Sports Union	28–52	Berkeley All Blues

=== Week 8 ===
21 October 2017

Chicago North Shore Rugby	14–17	Oregon Sports Union

21 October 2017

Glendale Merlins	27–18	San Diego Surfers

22 October 2017

Beantown RFC	32–5	DC Furies

22 October 2017

New York Rugby Club	36–12	Atlanta Harlequins

=== Week 9 ===
28 October 2017

Berkeley All Blues	48–15	Chicago North Shore Rugby

28 October 2017

Oregon Sports Union	12–39	San Diego Surfers

29 October 2017

Twin Cities Amazons	18–29	Beantown RFC

29 October 2017

DC Furies	10–48	New York Rugby Club

=== Week 10 ===
4 November 2017

San Diego Surfers	25–10	Berkeley All Blues

4 November 2017

Oregon Sports Union	27–31	Glendale Merlins

5 November 2017

DC Furies	5–25	Atlanta Harlequins

5 November 2017

New York Rugby Club	32–15	Twin Cities Amazons

== Playoffs ==
=== Bowl Semi-finals ===
10 November 2017

Oregon Sports Union	56–7	DC Furies

-

10 November 2017

Atlanta Harlequins	5–24	Chicago North Shore Rugby

-

10 November 2017

Berkeley All Blues	41–29	Twin Cities Amazons

-

=== Cup Semi-finals ===
10 November 2017

Glendale Merlins	32–0	Beantown RFC

-

10 November 2017

New York Rugby Club	38–32	San Diego Surfers

-

=== Bowl Finals ===
==== 9th place Final ====
12 November 2017

DC Furies	10–34	Atlanta Harlequins

==== 7th place Final ====
12 November 2017

Twin Cities Amazons	34–17	Chicago North Shore Rugby

==== 5th place Finals ====
12 November 2017

Berkeley All Blues	37–10	Oregon Sports Union

=== Cup Finals ===
==== 3rd place Final ====
12 November 2017

San Diego Surfers	47–14	Beantown RFC

==== Grand Final ====
12 November 2017

Glendale Merlins	26–27	New York Rugby Club
