= 2022 Women's Premier League Rugby season =

2022 WPL Rugby
- Countries: USA
- Number of teams: 10
- Champions: Berkeley All Blues
- Runners-up: Beantown RFC
- Matches played: 50

Official website
- wplrugby.org

The 2022 Women's Premier League Rugby season is the twelfth season of the Women's Premier League.

== Season change ==
This season of the WPL will commence in the spring of 2022 unlike previous seasons which were played in the fall. WPL Reps along with the Competitions/Scheduling committee agreed to move the WPL league season to spring to align better with international playing windows and also with Division 1 and 2 Championships. This was initially supposed to start in Spring 2021, but was postponed because of COVID-19.

== Season standings ==
Final standings after the regular season:

Advanced to Cup Competition
Advanced to Bowl Competition

=== Red Conference ===
Pos.	Team	GP	W	D	L	PF	PA	PD	TBP	LBP	FF	Pts
1	New York Rugby Club	8	7	0	1	305	138	+167	5	0	0	33
2	Colorado Gray Wolves	8	6	1	1	355	97	+258	6	0	0	32
3	San Diego Surfers	8	3	1	4	208	215	-7	3	0	0	17
4	Oregon Sports Union	8	2	0	6	118	395	-277	1	0	0	9
5	Twin Cities Amazons	8	0	2	6	107	248	-141	2	2	0	8

=== Blue Conference ===
Pos.	Team	GP	W	D	L	PF	PA	PD	TBP	LBP	FF	Pts
1	Berkeley All Blues	8	6	0	2	344	107	+237	6	2	0	32
2	Beantown RFC	8	5	0	3	248	106	+142	6	3	0	29
3	Life West Gladiatrix	8	6	0	2	322	144	+178	5	0	1	28
4	Atlanta Harlequins	8	2	0	6	117	309	+192	2	0	2	8
5	Chicago North Shore Rugby	8	1	0	7	53	418	+365	1	0	2	3

== Regular season ==
=== Week 1 ===
April 9

Oregon Sports Union	17–34	Colorado Gray Wolves (TBP)
Try: Tiffany Tate 40' m Natayah Bauer 73' m Abby Fearey 79' c Con: Natayah Bauer 80'	Report	Try: Colleen Cribbs 14' c Jeanna Beard 35' m Katherine Lohaus (2) 43' m, 58' c Hannah Long 55' m Deanna Nash 69' m Con: Hannah Tennant 15'; Justine Perl 59'; Cards: Hannah Tennant (yellow card) 51' to 61'

April 17

Atlanta Harlequins	0–51	Berkeley All Blues (TBP)
	Report	Try: Evan Hoese (2) 6' m, 37' m Florence Gomez 10' m Lauren Rhode 13' m Jade-Alexandra McGrath (4) 40' c, 42' m, 62' m, 65' c Naomi Carrillo 68' c Con: Kristen Siano 40'; Lauren Rhode (2) 66', 68'

April 10

San Diego Surfers	12–23	New York Rugby Club
Try: Ashley Torrecillas 11' m Teigan MacDonald 61' c Con: Hunter Griendling 62'	Report	Try: Adriana Castillo 33' m Tiana Granby 47' m Gioanna Cruz 76' c Con: Allysa O'Neill 77'; Pen: Allysa O'Neill (2) 15', 80'

April 10

(TBP) Life West Gladiatrix	28–0	Chicago North Shore Rugby (FF)
	Report

Bye/s: Beantown RFC & Twin Cities Amazons

=== Week 2 ===
April 16

Life West Gladiatrix	17–10	Beantown RFC (LBP)
Try: Juliann Tordonato 3' c Kayla Lawson 34' m Sisileti Hingano 46' m Con: McKenzie Hawkins 4'	Report	Try: Bridget Kahele 8' m Emily Prentice 28' m

April 17

(TBP) New York Rugby Club	52–7	Twin Cities Amazons
Try: Nicole Carroll 15' m Matilda Kocaj 22' c Adriana Castillo 32' m Misha Green 54' c Mia Lancelotti (2) 62' m, 71' m Gioanna Cruz 73' m Marjorie Olney 78' c Con: Allysa O'Neill (2) 23', 55'; Marjorie Olney 78'; Pen: Allysa O'Neill 38'; Marjorie Olney 70'	Report	Try: Maggie Kleyer 80' c Con: Maggie Kleyer 80'

April 9

(TBP) Berkeley All Blues	28–0	Chicago North Shore Rugby (FF)
	Report

April 17

(TBP) San Diego Surfers	61–12	Oregon Sports Union
Try: Hunter Griendling 1' c Kimdinh Tran 9' c Ashley Torrecillas 11' c Evelyn Ashenbrucker (4) 26' c, 47' c, 49' m, 76' c Teigan MacDonald 40' c Julia Buescher 78' c Con: Hunter Griendling (8) 2', 10', 13', 27', 41', 48', 77', 79'	Report	Try: San Juanita Fetuuaho 41' m Te Awhina Ho Chee 54' c Con: Natayah Bauer 54'

Bye/s: Atlanta Harlequins & Colorado Gray Wolves

=== Week 3 ===
April 23

(TBP+LBP) Berkeley All Blues	33–40	Life West Gladiatrix (TBP)
Try: Elena Clark 41' m Abby Vogel 56' c Hope Cooper 60' c Lauren Rhode 66' c Kristen Siano 85' c Con: Lauren Rhode (4) 57', 61', 67', 86'; Cards: Tahlia Brody (yellow card) 40' to 50'	Report	Try: Kayla Lawson (2) 2' m, 32' c Elizabeth Cairns 8' c Juliann Tordonato (2) 46' c, 51' c Angelina Lomu 80' c Con: McKenzie Hawkins (5) 9', 33', 47', 53', 81'; Cards: Cameo Johnson (yellow card) 16' to 26'; Siale Alatini (yellow card) 24' to 34'; Talica Vodo (yellow card) 53' to 63'

April 23

(TBP) Colorado Gray Wolves	76–27	Twin Cities Amazons (TBP)
Try: Rachel Ehrecke 2'm Deanna Nash (2) 9' m, 45' m Samantha Sullivan (2) 17' m, 71' c Katherine Lohaus (2) 19' m, 35' m Carson Hann 28' m Jessica Dombrowski (3) 41' m, 43' m, 80' c Caitlin Weigel 62' m Beatriz Amaral 64' m Nichole Wanamaker 78' c Con: Natalie Norcutt (3) 72', 79', 80'	Report	Try: Emily Johnston 26' c Kelsey Coley (2) 31' c, 51' m Mariah Lundstrum 40' m Con: Kathryn Johnson (2) 26', 32'; Pen: Kathryn Johnson 13'

April 23

Oregon Sports Union	17–44	New York Rugby Club (TBP)
Try: Zoe Wilson 11' m Elizabeth Mastrangelo 30' c Paris Hart 68' m Con: Tiffany Tate 31'	Report	Try: Gioanna Cruz 18' m Matilda Kocaj (2) 25' c, 35' m Jennifer Fremd 33' m Justina DeBruzzi 37' c Tiana Granby (2) 54' m, 77' m Grace Murphy 73' m Con: Gianna Solomon (2) 26', 38'; Cards: Gioanna Cruz (yellow card) 68' to 78'

April 24

(FF) Atlanta Harlequins	0–28	Beantown RFC (TBP)
	Report

Bye/s: Chicago North Shore Rugby & San Diego Surfers

=== Week 4 ===
April 30

(LBP) Twin Cities Amazons	10–15	Oregon Sports Union
Try: Kaelene Lundstrum 3' m Brittany White 27' m Cards: Alicia Gillberg (yellow card) 31' to 41'	Report	Try: Adrienne Acosta 13' m Zoe Wilson 33' m Madison Rathsman 37' m

April 30

(LBP) Beantown RFC	12–15	Berkeley All Blues
Try: Rachael Harkavy 22' c Emily Prentice 42' m Con: Rachael Harkavy 24'	Report	Try: Abby Vogel 36' c Elena Clark 57' m Con: Lauren Rhode 37'; Pen: Lauren Rhode 82'

April 30

(TBP) Colorado Gray Wolves	60–7	San Diego Surfers
Try: Madison Slaught (2) 8' c, 80 c Samantha Sullivan (4) 10' c, 18' c, 40' m, 65' m Beatriz Amaral 31' c Caitlin Weigel 48' c Jessica Dombrowski 55' m Con: Hannah Tennant (6) 8', 10', 18', 32', 49', 80'; Pen: Hannah Tennant 28'	Report	Try: Teigan MacDonald 42' c Con: Hunter Griendling 42'; Cards: Lauren Thunen (yellow card) 17' to 27'

May 1

(TBP) Chicago North Shore Rugby	28–0	Atlanta Harlequins (FF)
	Report

Bye/s: Life West Gladiatrix & New York Rugby Club

=== Week 5 ===
May 7

New York Rugby Club	15–0	Colorado Gray Wolves
Try: Gioanna Cruz 28' c Matilda Kocaj 40' m Con: Allysa O'Neill 29'; Pen: Allysa O'Neill 71'	Report

May 7

(TBP) Beantown RFC	64–5	Chicago North Shore Rugby
Try: Genevieve Quirion (2) 3' m, 60' m Emily Henrich 13' m Amanda Schweitzer (2) 15' m, 51' c Yejadai Dunn 28' m Claire Stingley (2) 30' c, 47' m Nicole McCardle 55' m Rachael Harkavy (2) 68' m, 77'm Claire Collins 80' m Con: Rachael Harkavy (2) 31', 52'	Report	Try: Emma Farnan 73' m Cards: Alecia Eschenbrenner (yellow card) 60' to 70'

May 8

(TBP) San Diego Surfers	23–22	Twin Cities Amazons (TBP+LBP)
Try: Amy Verdonik 12' m Ashley Torrecillas 42' m Kanausha Thompson 51' m Elona Williams 65' m Pen: Hunter Griendling 35'	Report	Try: Maggie Kleyer 3' m Brooke Doerscher 24' m Brittany White 47' m Ashlee Beauchamp 73' c Con: Maggie Kleyer 74'; Cards: Brittany White (yellow card) 9' to 19'

May 8

(TBP) Atlanta Harlequins	28–0	Life West Gladiatrix (FF)
	Report

Bye/s: Berkeley All Blues & Oregon Sports Union

=== Week 6 ===
May 14

Chicago North Shore Rugby	0–105	Life West Gladiatrix (TBP)
	Report	Try: Kaitlyn Broughton (2) 0' c, 46' m McKenzie Hawkins 4' c Sisileti Hingano (3) 9' c, 44' m, 53' c Amy Bonte (2) 12' c, 59' m Siale Alatini (2) 22' c, 35' m Christina Opeti 25' c Elizabeth Cairns (2) 30' c, 55' c Myia Wilkes 49' c Jett Hayward 62' m Angelina Lomu 66' m Juliann Tordonato 75' m Con: McKenzie Hawkins (10) 1', 6', 10', 13', 23', 26', 32', 50', 54', 56'

May 14

(TBP) Colorado Gray Wolves	71–0	Oregon Sports Union
Try: Madison Slaught 3' c Jeanna Beard 9' c Chloe Jex 15' c Samantha Sullivan (3) 19' c, 61' c, 64' c Rachel Ehrecke (2) 24' c, 45' m Deanna Nash 26' m Madison Williams 55' c Beatriz Amaral 67' m Con: Hannah Tennant (8) 4', 10', 16', 20', 24', 56', 62', 64'	Report	Cards: Tiara A'au (yellow card) 48' to 58'

May 15

(TBP) New York Rugby Club	34–19	San Diego Surfers
Try: Matilda Kocaj 39' m Sarah Minahan 42' c Misha Green 55' c Adriana Castillo 64' c Denisse Zambon Regalado 72' m Con: Allysa O'Neill (3) 43', 56', 65'; Pen: Allysa O'Neill 19'	Report	Try: Kimdinh Tran 8' m Julia Buescher 24' c Hunter Griendling 28' c Con: Hunter Griendling (2) 25', 28'

June 11

(TBP) Berkeley All Blues	75–10	Atlanta Harlequins
Try: Naomi Carrillo 1' m Laura Thacker (2) 7' c, 37' m Jade-Alexandra McGrath (4) 25' c, 46' m, 56' m, 78' m Serena Liu 30' c Elena Clark 33' c Tahlia Brody (2) 49' m, 70' m Madison Taylor 62' m Rebecca Graff 72' c Con: Alyssa Collins (3) 8', 26', 73'; Elena Clark (2) 31', 34'	Report	Try: Amanda Watkins 11' m Sierra Watkins 52' m

Bye/s: Beantown RFC & Twin Cities Amazons

=== Week 7 ===
May 21

Twin Cities Amazons	10–34	New York Rugby Club (TBP)
Try: Kelsey Coley 27' c Con: Maggie Kleyer 27'; Pen: Maggie Kleyer 7'	Report	Try: Denisse Zambon Regalado 2' m Kristin Aliberto 8' m Matilda Kocaj (2) 24' m, 70' c Nicole Carroll 31' c Mara Jacobs 51' m Con: Allysa O'Neill 31'; Congetta Owens 70'; Cards: Denisse Zambon Regalado (yellow card) 63' to 73' (red card) 76'

May 21

Oregon Sports Union	8–72	San Diego Surfers (TBP)
Try: Paris Hart 31' m Pen: Natayah Bauer 20'	Report	Try: Srob Oberman-Breindel 4' c Lauren Thunen (4) 13' c, 69' m, 75' m, 77' c Teigan MacDonald 21' c Sheree Collins (3) 38' m, 42' m, 66' m Hunter Griendling 53' c Julia Buescher 60' c Ruby Wyatt 63' m Con: Hunter Griendling (6) 5', 14', 23', 53', 61', 77'

May 21

(TBP+LBP) Beantown RFC	25–30	Life West Gladiatrix (TBP)
Try: Megan Pinson (2) 5' m, 23' c Rachael Harkavy 15' m Yejadai Dunn 61' m Con: Rachael Harkavy 24'; Pen: Rachael Harkavy 51'	Report	Try: Sisileti Hingano 19' m Lauren Kenyon 25' c Christina Opeti 43' m Siale Alatini 70' c Con: McKenzie Hawkins (2) 26', 71'; Pen: McKenzie Hawkins (2) 55', 77'; Cards: Molly Shamieh (yellow card) 60' to 70'

May 22

Chicago North Shore Rugby	0–75	Berkeley All Blues (TBP)
	Report	Try: Hope Cooper (2) 10' c, 74' c Tahlia Brody 13' m Evan Hoese 16' m Allison Byrne 20' m Serena Liu 38' m Alyssa Collins 43' m Tyra Norlander 47' m Jade-Alexandra McGrath (2) 50' c, 64' c Abby Vogel 71' m Laura Thacker 76' c Lauren Rhode 79' m Con: Lauren Rhode (5) 11', 51', 65', 75', 77'

Bye/s: Atlanta Harlequins & Colorado Gray Wolves

=== Week 8 ===
June 18

(TBP) Beantown RFC	34–12	Atlanta Harlequins
Try: Team score 8' c Yejadai Dunn 13' m Erin Wright 20' c Brittany Dykes 34' m Genevieve Quirion 45' c Con: Amanda Schweitzer (3) 9', 21', 46'; Pen: Amanda Schweitzer 70'	Report	Try: Lisa Jackson 29' m Brandalyn Watts 75' c Con: Corinne Heavner 76'

May 28

Twin Cities Amazons	7–7	Colorado Gray Wolves
	Report

May 28

Life West Gladiatrix	21–48	Berkeley All Blues (TBP)
Try: Talica Vodo (2) 6' m, 47' c Kayla Lawson 17' c Con: Aimee Ramos (3) 7', 18', 48'	Report	Try: Evan Hoese 3' m Jade-Alexandra McGrath (2) 11' c, 23' c Kristen Siano (3) 20' m, 38' c, 51' m Elena Edwards 67' m Ceara Lafferty 77' c Con: Lauren Rhode (3) 12', 24', 39'; Kristen Siano 78'

May 29

(TBP) New York Rugby Club	86–15	Oregon Sports Union
Try: Misha Green (2) 5' m, 38' c Mara Jacobs 12' m Matilda Kocaj (2) 18' m, 41' m Sarah Minahan 26' m Shamira Robles 32' c Jennifer Fremd 40' c Ray-Ann Montano (2) 60' m, 66' c Adriana Castillo 62' c Nicole Carroll 70' c Justina DeBruzzi 76' c Jessica Ruiz 80' c Con: Allysa O'Neill (8) 32', 38', 40', 62', 66', 70', 76', 80'	Report	Try: Te Awhina Ho Chee 21' m San Juanita Fetuuaho 54' m Tiara A'au 73' m Cards: Tiara A'au (yellow card) 51' to 61'; Shamarica Scott (yellow card) 58' to 68'

Bye/s: Chicago North Shore Rugby & San Diego Surfers

=== Week 9 ===
June 4

San Diego Surfers	7–49	Colorado Gray Wolves (TBP)
Try: Lauren Thunen 33' c Con: Hunter Griendling 34'	Report	Try: Deanna Nash 5' c Chloe Jex 10' m Hannah Long 13' c Madison Slaught 16' m Kate Herren (2) 29' m, 48' m Caitlin Weigel 57' c Sam Luther 61' m Con: Hannah Tennant (3) 6', 14', 58'; Pen: Hannah Tennant 40'

June 4

(LBP) Berkeley All Blues	19–24	Beantown RFC (TBP)
Try: Tyra Norlander 39' c Elena Edwards 57' m Roseline Okpara 70' c Con: Kristen Siano (2) 39', 71'	Report	Try: Paige Stathopoulos 11' m Amanda Schweitzer 34' m Emily Prentice 50' c Genevieve Quirion 66' c Con: Amanda Schweitzer (2) 51', 67'

June 4

(TBP) Oregon Sports Union	34–17	Twin Cities Amazons
Try: San Juanita Fetuuaho 30' m Mariko Moore (2) 37' m, 52' c Shamarica Scott 59' m Paris Hart 67' m Tiara A'au 79' c Con: Natayah Bauer 53'; Shamarica Scott 79'	Report	Try: Maggie Kleyer 3' c Team score 72' c Con: Maggie Kleyer (2) 3', 72'; Pen: Maggie Kleyer 44'; Cards: Brooke Doerscher (yellow card) 52' to 62'

June 5

(TBP) Atlanta Harlequins	67–12	Chicago North Shore Rugby
Try: Sarah Montembeau 9' c Cynthia Campbell (4) 15' c, 20' c, 24' c, 38' c Saher Hamdan 18' m Ubaida Ahmed 53' c Queenette Toomalatai 63' c Autumn Locicero 67' c Con: Corinne Heavner (8) 10', 16', 22', 25', 39', 53', 64', 68'; Pen: Corinne Heavner 34'; Drop: Corinne Heavner 72'	Report	Try: Lauren Trout 44' m Bridget Kapinus 61' c Con: Lauren Trout 62'

Bye/s: Life West Gladiatrix & New York Rugby Club

=== Week 10 ===
June 11

Twin Cities Amazons	7–7	San Diego Surfers
	Report

June 11

(TBP) Colorado Gray Wolves	58–17	New York Rugby Club
Try: Deanna Nash 13' c Madison Slaught 23' c Nichole Wanamaker (2) 29' m, 57' c Kelsie O'Brien 36' c Hannah Tennant 39' m Kate Herren 44' c Jessica Dombrowski 60' m Charlotte Thompson 71' m Con: Hannah Tennant (5) 14', 24', 37', 45', 58'; Drop: Deanna Nash 49'; Cards: Rachel Ryan (yellow card) 56' to 66'; Olivia Ortiz (yellow card) 76' to 80'	Report	Try: Kristin Aliberto 4' c Gioanna Cruz 51' m Matilda Kocaj 69' m Con: Allysa O'Neill 5'; Cards: Gioanna Cruz (yellow card) 28' to 38'

June 12

Chicago North Shore Rugby	8–51	Beantown RFC (TBP)
Try: Erin Nelsen 51' m Pen: Emma Farnan 39'	Report	Try: Team score 1' m Hannah Mackay (3) 19' m, 69' m, 73' m Amanda Schweitzer 27' c Genevieve Quirion 32' m Yejadai Dunn 36' m Claire Collins 56' c Sarah Romano 77' c Con: Amanda Schweitzer (3) 28', 57', 79'

June 12

(TBP) Life West Gladiatrix	81–0	Atlanta Harlequins
Try: Aimee Ramos 5' c Bailey Johnson 11' c Heidi Tressler (2) 14' m, 39' m Kayla Lawson 19' c Miriama Marawa (3) 23' m, 29' c, 45' c Angelina Lomu 52' c Siale Alatini (3) 58' c, 61' m, 71' m Molly Shamieh 73' c Con: Aimee Ramos (8) 6', 12', 20', 30', 46', 53', 59', 75'	Report	Cards: Brandalyn Watts (yellow card) 37' to 47'; Maxine Fonua (yellow card) 57' to 67'

Bye/s: Berkeley All Blues & Oregon Sports Union

== Play-offs ==
=== Bowl Competition ===
June 24

Oregon Sports Union	12–61	Chicago North Shore Rugby
Try: San Juanita Fetuuaho 60' c Te Awhina Ho Chee 79' m Con: Tiffany Tate 62'	Report	Try: Emma Farnan (4) 3' c, 21' c, 35' c, 40' c Bridget Kapinus 9' c Ellen Chirikos 28' c Jamelia Reed 54' c Erin Nelsen 72' m Kadie Sanford 80' c Con: Emma Farnan (8) 4', 10', 22', 30', 36', 40', 56', 80'

June 24

Twin Cities Amazons	13–26	Atlanta Harlequins
Try: Mariah Lundstrum 49' m Meghan Flanigan 63' m Pen: Maggie Kleyer 20'	Report	Try: Lara Gartner 22' c Amanda Watkins 33' m Cynthia Campbell 59' c Brandalyn Watts 76' c Con: Corinne Heavner (3) 23', 60', 77'; Cards: Monique Compito (yellow card) 17' to 27'

June 24

San Diego Surfers	5–47	Life West Gladiatrix
Try: Lauren Thunen 31' m Cards: Maya Jackson (yellow card) 12' to 23'	Report	Try: Siale Alatini (3) 13' c, 46' c, 73' c Sisileti Hingano 28' m Kayla Lawson 39' c Jett Hayward 48' c Kaitlyn Broughton 67' c Con: McKenzie Hawkins (6) 14', 41', 47', 49', 68', 75'; Cards: Siale Alatini (yellow card) 50' to 60'

==== 9th Place Final ====
June 26

Oregon Sports Union	22–37	Twin Cities Amazons
	Report

==== 7th Place Final ====
June 26

Atlanta Harlequins	24–43	San Diego Surfers
	Report

==== 5th Place Final ====
June 26

Chicago North Shore Rugby	3–48	Life West Gladiatrix
	Report

=== Cup Competition ===
Semi-finals
New York Rugby Club	12
Beantown RFC	46
Colorado Gray Wolves	18
Berkeley All Blues	33

Final
Berkeley All Blues	29
Beantown RFC	7
Third place
Colorado Gray Wolves	44
New York Rugby Club	10

==== Semi-finals ====
June 24

New York Rugby Club	12–46	Beantown RFC
Try: Tess Feury 31' m Denisse Zambon Regalado 52' c Con: Denisse Zambon Regalado 53'; Cards: Allysa O'Neill (yellow card) 62' to 72'	Report	Try: Claire Collins 3' m Emma Santosuosso 10' m Emily Henrich 13' c Yejadai Dunn 35' m Bridget Kahele 39' m Emily Prentice 49' c Team score 62' m Brittany Dykes 78' c Con: Emily Henrich 14'; Amanda Schweitzer 50'; Brittany Dykes 79'

June 24

Colorado Gray Wolves	18–33	Berkeley All Blues
Try: Rachel Ryan 36' m Madison Slaught 39' m Colleen Cribbs 75' m Pen: Hannah Tennant 2'; Cards: Kate Herren (yellow card) 22' to 32'	Report	Try: Kristen Shalosky 6' m Tahlia Brody (2) 13' m, 51' c Serena Liu (2) 61' m, 64' m Con: Kristen Siano 53'; Pen: Kristen Siano (2) 30', 68'

==== 3rd Place Final ====
June 26

Colorado Gray Wolves	44–10	New York Rugby Club
	Report

==== Grand Final ====
June 26

Berkeley All Blues	29–7	Beantown RFC
	Report
