= 2011 Women's Premier League Rugby season =

2011 Women's Premier League
- Countries: United States
- Number of teams: 8
- Champions: Berkeley All Blues
- Runners-up: Twin Cities Amazons
- Promoted: San Diego Surfers
- Relegated: Oregon Sports Union
- Matches played: 32

The 2011 Women's Premier League Rugby season was the third season of the Women's Premier League in the United States. It began on September 10 and involved eight teams.

== Format ==
Oregon Sports Union was relegated in the off-season and the San Diego Surfers had their first year as a part of the WPL. The eight teams were divided into two conferences, Red and Blue, comprising four teams. They each played six conference games, one home and one away. The WPL season occurred in the fall, concurrently with the regular women's club season, with the National Championship being held in November 11–13.For the Finals, teams were seeded based on the results of their conference during the regular season. The top four teams competed for the Cup and the bottom teams for the Bowl.

== Conference standings ==
Conference standings are as follows:

Advanced to the Cup Semifinals
Advanced to the Bowl Semifinals

=== Red Conference ===
Pos.	Team	P	W	D	L	PF	PA	Diff	Pts
1	Twin Cities Amazons	6	5	0	1	246	47	199	26
2	San Diego Surfers	6	5	0	1	233	72	161	25
3	New York Rugby Club	6	2	0	4	118	182	-64	10
4	Minnesota Valkyries	6	0	0	6	49	345	-296	1

=== Blue Conference ===
Pos.	Team	P	W	D	L	PF	PA	Diff	Pts
1	Berkeley All Blues	6	6	0	0	280	53	227	30
2	Beantown RFC	6	3	0	3	133	130	3	14
3	Keystone Rugby Club	6	3	0	3	111	161	-50	14
4	DC Furies	6	0	0	6	68	248	-180	1

== Matches ==
=== Week 1 ===
10 September 2011

Beantown RFC	5-19	Keystone Rugby Club

11 September 2011

DC Furies	10-52	Berkeley All Blues

11 September 2011

New York Rugby Club	3-34	San Diego Surfers

11 September 2011

Minnesota Valkyries	10-64	Twin Cities Amazons

=== Week 2 ===
17 September 2011

Berkeley All Blues	71-10	Keystone Rugby Club

18 September 2011

Beantown RFC	50-0	DC Furies

18 September 2011

Twin Cities Amazons	37-5	New York Rugby Club

18 September 2011

San Diego Surfers	81-7	Minnesota Valkyries

=== Week 3 ===
1 October 2011

Berkeley All Blues	48-10	Beantown RFC

1 October 2011

San Diego Surfers	22-17	Twin Cities Amazons

2 October 2011

DC Furies	RESCHEDULED	Keystone Rugby Club

2 October 2011

New York Rugby Club	56-5	Minnesota Valkyries

=== Week 4 ===
8 October 2011

Keystone Rugby Club	50-5	DC Furies

9 October 2011

Beantown RFC	7-36	Berkeley All Blues

9 October 2011

Keystone Rugby Club	22-19	DC Furies

9 October 2011

Minnesota Valkyries	22-19	New York Rugby Club

9 October 2011

Twin Cities Amazons	35-0	San Diego Surfers

=== Week 5 ===
23 October 2011

DC Furies	15-42	Beantown RFC

23 October 2011

Keystone Rugby Club	0-38	Berkeley All Blues

23 October 2011

New York Rugby Club	10-47	Twin Cities Amazons

23 October 2011

Minnesota Valkyries	5-59	San Diego Surfers

=== Week 6 ===
29 October 2011

Berkeley All Blues	32-14	DC Furies

30 October 2011

Keystone Rugby Club	10-19	Beantown RFC

30 October 2011

San Diego Surfers	37-5	New York Rugby Club

30 October 2011

Twin Cities Amazons	48-0	Minnesota Valkyries

== Playoffs ==
=== Bowl Semifinals ===
11 November 2011

New York Rugby Club	20-5	DC Furies

-

11 November 2011

Keystone Rugby Club	43-38	Minnesota Valkyries

-

=== Cup Semifinals ===
11 November 2011

Twin Cities Amazons	29-25	Beantown RFC

-

11 November 2011

Berkeley All Blues	17-7	San Diego Surfers

-

=== Bowl Finals ===
==== 7th Place Final ====
13 November 2011

DC Furies	22-17	Minnesota Valkyries

==== 5th Place Final ====
13 November 2011

New York Rugby Club	27-5	Keystone Rugby Club

=== Cup Finals ===
==== 3rd Place Final ====
13 November 2011

Beantown RFC	34-7	San Diego Surfers

==== Grand Final ====
13 November 2011

Berkeley All Blues	17-8	Twin Cities Amazons
