= 2010 Women's Premier League Rugby season =

2010 Women's Premier League
- Countries: United States
- Number of teams: 8
- Champions: New York Rugby Club
- Runners-up: Beantown RFC
- Matches played: 32

The 2010 Women's Premier League Rugby season was the second season of the Women's Premier League in the United States. It began on September 11 and involved eight teams.

== Format ==
The teams remained the same from the 2009 season. The eight teams were divided into two conferences comprising four teams. They each played six conference games, one home and one away. The WPL season occurred in the fall, concurrently with the regular women's club season, with the National Championship being held in November 12–14.

For the Finals, teams were seeded based on the results of their conference during the regular season. The top four teams competed for the Cup and the bottom teams for the Bowl. This was the first year where promotions and relegations into the WPL were decided at the end of the season.

== Conference standings ==
Advanced to the Cup Semifinals
Advanced to the Bowl Semifinals

=== Eastern Conference ===
Pos.	Team	P	W	D	L	PF	PA	Diff	Pts
1	New York Rugby Club	6	6	0	0	286	93	193	30
2	Minnesota Valkyries	6	3	0	3	187	158	29	16
3	Keystone Rugby Club	6	2	0	4	174	117	57	10
4	Oregon Sports Union	6	1	0	5	105	236	-131	6

=== Western Conference ===
Pos.	Team	P	W	D	L	PF	PA	Diff	Pts
1	Berkeley All Blues	6	4	0	2	198	117	81	22
2	Beantown RFC	6	4	0	2	179	220	-41	22
3	Twin Cities Amazons	6	2	0	4	153	128	25	21
4	DC Furies	6	0	0	6	72	140	-68	2

== Matches ==
=== Week 1 ===
11 September 2010

Berkeley All Blues	36-29	Twin Cities Amazons

12 September 2010

Minnesota Valkyries	12-32	New York Rugby Club

12 September 2010

Keystone Rugby Club	41-3	Oregon Sports Union

12 September 2010

Beantown RFC	31-8	DC Furies

=== Week 2 ===
19 September 2010

New York Rugby Club	46-17	Keystone Rugby Club

19 September 2010

Oregon Sports Union	41-0	Minnesota Valkyries

19 September 2010

Beantown RFC	30-32	Berkeley All Blues

19 September 2010

DC Furies	7-22	Twin Cities Amazons

=== Week 3 ===
2 October 2010

Minnesota Valkyries	33-0	Keystone Rugby Club

3 October 2010

Oregon Sports Union	18-22	New York Rugby Club

3 October 2010

DC Furies	15-22	Berkeley All Blues

3 October 2010

Twin Cities Amazons	32-21	Beantown RFC

=== Week 4 ===
9 October 2010

Oregon Sports Union	7-15	Keystone Rugby Club

10 October 2010

New York Rugby Club	48-26	Minnesota Valkyries

10 October 2010

DC Furies	12-34	Beantown RFC

10 October 2010

Berkeley All Blues	10-19	Twin Cities Amazons

=== Week 5 ===
23 October 2010

Berkeley All Blues	23-29	Beantown RFC

24 October 2010

Keystone Rugby Club	10-60	New York Rugby Club

24 October 2010

Minnesota Valkyries	92-19	Oregon Sports Union

24 October 2010

Twin Cities Amazons	46-20	DC Furies

=== Week 6 ===
30 October 2010

Berkeley All Blues	75-10	DC Furies

31 October 2010

New York Rugby Club	66-17	Oregon Sports Union

31 October 2010

Keystone Rugby Club	18-24	Minnesota Valkyries

31 October 2010

Beantown RFC	34-5	Twin Cities Amazons

== Playoffs ==
=== Bowl Semifinals ===
12 November 2010

Keystone Rugby Club	10-27	DC Furies

-

12 November 2010

Twin Cities Amazons	54-29	Oregon Sports Union

-

=== Cup Semifinals ===
12 November 2010

New York Rugby Club	24-13	Berkeley All Blues

-

12 November 2010

Beantown RFC	41-38	Minnesota Valkyries

-

=== Bowl Finals ===
==== 7th Place Final ====
14 November 2010

Keystone Rugby Club	32-10	Oregon Sports Union

==== 5th Place Final ====
14 November 2010

Twin Cities Amazons	36-8	DC Furies

=== Cup Finals ===
==== 3rd Place Final ====
14 November 2010

Berkeley All Blues	57-27	Minnesota Valkyries

==== Grand Final ====
14 November 2010

New York Rugby Club	33-8	Beantown RFC
