= 2009 Women's Premier League Rugby final =

- Event: 2009 Women's Premier League Rugby season
| New York RC | Berkeley All Blues |
| 20 | 10 |
- Date: 8 November 2009
- Venue: Gaelic Athletic Association Field, San Francisco, California
- Attendance: 500+

The 2009 Women's Premier League Rugby final was held in San Francisco, California from November 6–8. New York R. C. were the eventual winners with Berkeley All Blues as runners-up in the Cup competition.

== Match ==
| New York Rugby Club | 20 — 10 | Berkeley All Blues |
| | | | Attendance: 500+ |
