= Emilie Bydwell =

US international rugby union player

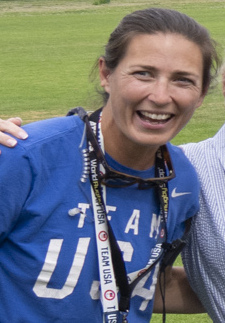
- Bydwell in 2024
- Born: 31 August 1985 (age 41) Toronto, Ontario, Canada
- Height: 5 ft 10 in (1.78 m)
- Weight: 143 lb (65 kg; 10 st 3 lb)

Rugby union career
- Position: Center
Amateur team(s)
Years	Team	Apps	(Points)
2008 - 2011	Beantown RFC		
2012 - 2014	San Diego Surfers		
International career
Years	Team	Apps	(Points)
2008-2014	United States	12	(10)
Coaching career
- Years: Team
- 2016 - 2017: Seattle Atavus
- 2018 - 2019: San Diego Surfers
- 2021 – Present: United States 7s
Medal record
Women's rugby sevens
Representing United States
Olympic Games
Bronze medal – third place	2024 Paris	Team competition

Emilie Bydwell (born 31 August 1985) is a Canadian American rugby union coach and former player. Bydwell was a three-time All-American at Brown University and was also selected as the 2007 Collegiate Player of the Year. While at Brown University she also played ice hockey.

== Rugby career ==
=== Playing career ===
Bydwell began playing rugby at age fourteen.

Bydwell graduated from Brown University in 2008 with a degree in human biology. After college she played senior club rugby with the Beantown Rugby in Boston, MA. She made her USA Eagles debut against England in August 2008.

Bydwell was a member of the 2010 Women's Rugby World Cup roster for the United States, where the US finished in fifth place. In 2011, Bydwell moved from Boston to San Diego, CA to train with the emerging USA Rugby Sevens Residency program. In 2012, Bydwell won a senior club 7s national title with the San Diego Surfers, and was named tournament MVP.

Bydwell appeared in the 2013 Dubai Women's Sevens representing the USA. She was also a member of the 2013 Rugby World Cup Sevens team for the United States, who finished in third place.

Bydwell was named to the 2014 Women's Rugby World Cup roster for the United States, who finished in sixth place.

=== Coaching career ===
Bydwell began her coaching career at Brown University before moving to San Diego to continue her playing career.

Bydwell coached for Atavus and was named USA Rugby Coach of the Year in 2016. She coached three consecutive USA Rugby Club 7s National Championship teams with Atavus Academy in 2017 and the San Diego Surfers in 2018 and 2019.

From 2018-2021, Bydwell served as the USA Rugby Director of Women’s High Performance.

Bydwell was named the head coach of the United States women's national rugby sevens team on November 23, 2021.

At the 2024 Summer Olympics, Bydwell coached the USA women's seven's team to a bronze medal finish, becoming the first USA women's team to win an olympic medal in rugby, and the first female head coach to lead a team to an Olympic medal.

== Personal life ==
Emilie has been married to Michaela Staniford since 2015.
