= 2019 Women's Premier League Rugby final =

- Event: 2019 WPL Rugby season
Glendale Merlins	Life West Gladiatrix
39	31
- Date: 3 November, 2019

The 2019 Women's Premier League Rugby final was held in Glendale, Colorado on November 3. Glendale Merlins were crowned WPL Champions after defeating Life West Gladiatrix.

== Match ==
=== Details ===
Nov 3	Glendale Merlins	39 – 31	Life West Gladiatrix
	Try: Joanna Kitlinski 0'; Kaitlyn Broughton 39', 54'; Nalbandian, Azniv 47', 63'; Con: McKenzie Hawkins 1', 48', 55', 64'; Pen: McKenzie Hawkins 10', 26'; Cards: Rachel Ehrecke 77' (Yellow)	Report	Try: Elona Williams 6', 15'; Amy Naber 58'; Neariah Persinger 72'; Sara Parsons 77'; Con: Sisileti Hingano 7'; Hali Deters 59', 78'

Team details

FB	15	Deanna Nash	(substituted off) 72'
RW	14	Beatriz Amaral	(substituted off) 67'
OC	13	Juliann Tordonato
IC	12	McKenzie Hawkins
LW	11	Kaitlyn Broughton
FH	10	Gabriella Cantorna
SH	9	Carly Waters	(substituted off) 67'
N8	8	Carmen Farmer
OF	7	Rachel Ehrecke
BF	6	Rachel Ryan	(substituted off) 60'
RL	5	Jenny Kronish	(substituted off) 72'
LL	4	Charlotte Thompson
TP	3	Azniv Nalbandian	(substituted off) 72'
HK	2	Joanna Kitlinski	(substituted off) 70'
LP	1	Maya Learned	(substituted off) 72'
Replacements:
HK	16	Jeanna Beard	(substituted in) 60'
PR	17	Akweley Okine	(substituted in) 72'
PR	18	Franciny Alves Amaral	(substituted in) 72'
LK	19	Joanna McElroy	(substituted in) 72'
FL	20	Amandine Chatelier	(substituted in) 70'
FB	21	Kelsie O'Brien	(substituted in) 67'
WG	22	Madison Slaught	(substituted in) 72'
OB	23	Nichole Wanamaker	(substituted in) 67'
Coach:
Kittery Ruiz

FB	15	Sisileti Hingano	(substituted off) 74'
RW	14	Neariah Persinger
OC	13	Allyson Day	(substituted off) 47'
IC	12	Amy Naber
LW	11	Elona Williams
FH	10	Sara Parsons
SH	9	Lauren Kenyon	(substituted off) 64'
N8	8	Jennifer Sever
OF	7	Elizabeth Cairns
BF	6	Frieda Fetu'u	(substituted off) 49' (substituted in) 56'
RL	5	Nicole Strasko
LL	4	Rose Russell	(substituted off) 56'
TP	3	Catherine Benson
HK	2	Jessica Lewis	(substituted off) 72'
LP	1	Aubrey Huey
Replacements:
HK	16	Jessica Mulitalo
PR	17	Jett Hayward	(substituted in) 72'
PR	18	Tiara Littleton
LK	19	Hali Deters	(substituted in) 47'
LF	20	Mele Taumoefolau	(substituted in) 49'
SH	21	Annakaren Pedraza	(substituted in) 64'
OB	22	Karmin Macedo
LF	23	Mirelle Raza	(substituted in) 74'
Coach:
Adriaan Ferris
