= 2009 Women's Premier League Rugby season =

2009 Women's Premier League
- Countries: United States
- Number of teams: 8
- Champions: New York Rugby Club
- Runners-up: Berkeley All Blues
- Matches played: 32

The 2009 Women's Premier League Rugby season was the inaugural season of the Women's Premier League in the United States. It began on September 6 and involved eight teams.

== Format ==
The teams were chosen by their ranks from the previous three National Championships. The eight teams were divided into two conferences comprising four teams. They each played six conference games, one home and one away. The WPL season occurred in the fall, concurrently with the regular women's club season, with the National Championship being held in November 6-8.

For the Finals, teams were seeded based on the results of their conference during the regular season. The top four teams competed for the Cup and the bottom teams for the Bowl.

== Conference standings ==
Advanced to the Cup Semifinals
Advanced to the Bowl Semifinals

=== Eastern Conference ===
| Pos. | Team | P | W | D | L | F | A | Diff | TB | LB | Pts |
|---|---|---|---|---|---|---|---|---|---|---|---|
| 1 | Beantown RFC | 6 | 5 | 0 | 1 | 163 | 56 | 107 | 2 | 1 | 23 |
| 2 | New York Rugby Club | 6 | 4 | 0 | 2 | 196 | 77 | 119 | 4 | 1 | 21 |
| 3 | Keystone Rugby Club | 6 | 3 | 0 | 3 | 101 | 117 | -16 | 2 | 1 | 15 |
| 4 | DC Furies | 6 | 0 | 0 | 6 | 49 | 259 | -210 | 0 | 1 | 1 |

=== Western Conference ===
| Pos. | Team | P | W | D | L | F | A | Diff | TB | LB | Pts |
|---|---|---|---|---|---|---|---|---|---|---|---|
| 1 | Berkeley All Blues | 6 | 6 | 0 | 0 | 330 | 61 | 269 | 6 | 0 | 30 |
| 2 | Minnesota Valkyries | 6 | 4 | 0 | 2 | 213 | 89 | 124 | 4 | 0 | 20 |
| 3 | Twin Cities Amazons | 6 | 2 | 0 | 4 | 86 | 253 | -167 | 2 | 0 | 10 |
| 4 | Oregon Sports Union | 6 | 0 | 0 | 6 | 62 | 288 | -226 | 1 | 1 | 2 |

== Matches ==
=== Week 1 ===
6 September 2009

| Beantown RFC | 26-10 | New York Rugby Club |

6 September 2009

| Keystone Rugby Club | 38-8 | DC Furies |

6 September 2009

| Minnesota Valkyries | 0-38 | Berkeley All Blues |

6 September 2009

| Twin Cities Amazons | 32-27 | Oregon Sports Union |

=== Week 2 ===
13 September 2009

| Beantown RFC | 75-7 | DC Furies |

13 September 2009

| Berkeley All Blues | 100-7 | Twin Cities Amazons |

13 September 2009

| New York Rugby Club | 39-17 | Keystone Rugby Club |

13 September 2009

| Oregon Sports Union | 12-33 | Minnesota Valkyries |

=== Week 3 ===
27 September 2009

| DC Furies | 0-56 | New York Rugby Club |

27 September 2009

| Keystone Rugby Club | 15-13 | Beantown RFC |

27 September 2009

| Minnesota Valkyries | 45-5 | Twin Cities Amazons |

27 September 2009

| Oregon Sports Union | 10-44 | Berkeley All Blues |

=== Week 4 ===
4 October 2009

| Berkeley All Blues | 34-17 | Minnesota Valkyries |

4 October 2009

| DC Furies | 19-24 | Keystone Rugby Club |

4 October 2009

| New York Rugby Club | 17-19 | Beantown RFC |

4 October 2009

| Oregon Sports Union | 3-25 | Twin Cities Amazons |

=== Week 5 ===
18 October 2009

| DC Furies | 0-18 | Beantown RFC |

18 October 2009

| Keystone Rugby Club | 0-26 | New York Rugby Club |

18 October 2009

| Minnesota Valkyries | 72-0 | Oregon Sports Union |

18 October 2009

| Twin Cities Amazons | 17-32 | Berkeley All Blues |

=== Week 6 ===
25 October 2009

| Beantown RFC | 12-7 | Keystone Rugby Club |

25 October 2009

| Berkeley All Blues | 82-10 | Oregon Sports Union |

25 October 2009

| New York Rugby Club | 48-15 | DC Furies |

25 October 2009

| Twin Cities Amazons | 0-46 | Minnesota Valkyries |

== Playoffs ==
=== Bowl Semifinals ===
6 November, 2009

| Keystone Rugby Club | 27-5 | DC Furies |

-

6 November, 2009

| Twin Cities Amazons | 27-20 | Oregon Sports Union |

-

=== Cup Semifinals ===
6 November 2009

| Berkeley All Blues | 19-5 | Minnesota Valkyries |

-

6 November 2009

| New York Rugby Club | 13-10 | Beantown RFC |

-

=== Bowl Finals ===
==== 7th Place Final ====
8 November 2009

| DC Furies | 27-5 | Oregon Sports Union |

==== 5th Place Final ====
8 November 2009

| Keystone Rugby Club | 36-10 | Twin Cities Amazons |

=== Cup Finals ===
==== 3rd Place Final ====
8 November 2009

| Beantown RFC | 27-7 | Minnesota Valkyries |

==== Grand Final ====
8 November 2009

| New York Rugby Club | 20-10 | Berkeley All Blues |
