= 2019 Women's Premier League Rugby season =

2019 WPL Rugby
- Countries: United States
- Number of teams: 10
- Champions: Glendale Merlins
- Runners-up: Life West Gladiatrix
- Matches played: 50
- Top point scorer: Sisileti Hingano (91)
- Top try scorer: Sisileti Hingano (11)

The 2019 WPL Rugby Season was the eleventh season of the Women's Premier League Rugby. Life West Gladiatrix made their WPL debut and joined the West Conference and Chicago North Shore Rugby moved to the East Conference.

== Season standings ==
Final standings after the regular season:

Advanced to Cup Competition
Advanced to Bowl Competition

=== Eastern Conference ===
Pos.	Team	Pld	W	D	L	F	A	Diff	TB	LB	Pts
1	Atlanta Harlequins	8	7	0	1	310	107	203	7	0	35
2	New York Rugby Club	8	5	0	3	198	164	34	5	0	25
3	Beantown RFC	8	4	0	4	142	162	-20	2	0	18
4	Twin Cities Amazons	8	3	0	5	201	245	-44	3	1	16
5	Chicago North Shore Rugby	8	1	0	7	82	255	-173	1	1	6

=== Western Conference ===
Pos.	Team	Pld	W	D	L	F	A	Diff	TB	LB	Pts
1	Life West Gladiatrix	8	7	0	1	332	138	194	7	1	36
2	Glendale Merlins Women	8	7	0	1	334	142	192	6	0	34
3	Berkeley All Blues	8	3	0	5	170	193	-23	5	2	19
4	San Diego Surfers	8	3	0	5	215	217	-2	3	1	16
5	Oregon Sports Union	8	0	0	8	57	418	-361	0	0	0

== Regular season ==
=== Week 1 ===
August 17	Berkeley All Blues	29–5	Oregon Sports Union	Ray Sheeran Field
12:00 pm PDT	Try: Thacker, Laura #14 - 23', 44', 51'; Simpson, Margaret #11 - 35'; Mataitoga, Bulou #23 - 68'; Con: Miller, Samantha #10 - 24', 45'; Pen: Wessman, Tonya #7 - 15' (Y)		Try: Zimmerman, Brett #14 - 74'

August 17	Glendale Merlins	21–43	Life West Gladiatrix
3:00 pm MDT	Try: Nalbandian, Azniv #3 - 24'; Tordonato, Juliann #13 - 36'; Ehrecke, Rachel #7 - 54'; Con: Cantorna, Gabriella #10 - 26', 37', 55'; Pen: Luther, Samantha #5 - 44' (Y)		Try: Naber, Amy #12 - 6', 30'; Rogers, Hope #2 - 11', 71'; Hingano, Sisileti #15 - 28'; Kenyon, Lauren #9 - 41', 47'; Con: Hingano, Sisileti #15 - 11', 31', 42', 72'

August 18	Chicago North Shore Rugby	31–10	Twin Cities Amazons
12:00 pm CDT	Try: Jacoby, Charli #3 - 32'; Kapinus, Bridget #4 - 40'; Ventrillo, Jessica #15 - 44'; Niyibizi, Olga #14 - 54'; Dibalsamo, Rose #21 - 62'; Con: Stanley, Kathleen #10 - 41', 45', 63'		Try: Duhart, Lanoira #1 - 67'; Mooney-Jones, Danica #12 - 77'

August 18	Beantown Rugby	32–22	Atlanta Harlequins	Union Point Sports Complex
2:00 pm EDT	Try: Schweitzer, Amanda #13 - 9', 69'; Dunn, Yejadai #8 - 16'; Phelan, Kathleen #14 - 22'; Dykes, Brittany #11 - 40'; Wright, Rosanna #12 - 48'; Con: Toeldte, Tatjana #10 - 22'		Try: Kuehl, Cortney #8 - 29', 50'; Jackson, Lisa #1 - 60'; Con: Heavner, Corinne #10 - 29', 36' (PK), 60'; Pen: Kahele, Bridget #9 - 31' (Y)

Bye/s: New York Rugby Club & San Diego Surfers

=== Week 2 ===
August 24	Life West Gladiatrix	55–5	Oregon Sports Union	Ray Sheeran Field
1:00 pm PDT	Try: Sever, Jennifer #12 - 2'; Hingano, Sisileti #15 - 6', 54', 76'; Cairns, Elizabeth #7 - 16'; Rogers, Hope #8 - 23'; Strasko, Nicole #5 - 33'; Deters, Hali #13 - 45'; Parsons, Sara #10 - 65'; Con: Macedo, Karmin #11 - 3', 24', 34', 46', 55'; Pen: Sever, Jennifer #12 - 63' (Y)		Try: Yoder, Riley #21 - 71'

August 24	San Diego Surfers	17–29	Glendale Merlins
1:00 pm PDT	Try: Zackary, Kate #7 - 6'; Foster, Megan #10 - 57'; Con: Foster, Megan #10 - 7', 58', 69' (PK)		Try: Slaught, Madison #15 - 14'; Wanamaker, Nichole #11 - 33', 35'; Farmer, Carmen #8 - 46'; Kitlinski, Joanna #2 - 63'; Con: Cantorna, Gabriella #10 - 15', 34'; Pen: Nalbandian, Azniv #3 - 56' (Y)

August 24	Atlanta Harlequins	25–7	New York Rugby Club	Life University Rugby Complex
4:00 pm EDT	Try: Kuehl, Cortney #13 - 1'; Faget, Karen #8 - 20'; Jackson, Lisa #26 - 25'; Kahele, Bridget #9 - 64'; Con: Heavner, Corinne #10 - 64', 80' (PK)		Try: Washington, Alycia #5 - 29'; Con: Solomon, Gianna #12 - 30'

August 25	Beantown Rugby	12–22	Twin Cities Amazons	Union Point Sports Complex
11:00 am EDT	Try: Schweitzer, Amanda #13 - 53', 81'; Con: Toeldte, Tatjana #10 - 53'		Try: Lentsch, Rachel #9 - 9'; Mooney-Jones, Danica #11 - 64'; Lundstrum, Kaelene #14 - 78'; Con: Mooney-Jones, Danica #11 - 7' (PK), 9', 78'

Bye/s: Chicago North Shore Rugby & Berkeley All Blues

=== Week 3 ===
August 31	Life West Gladiatrix	36-20	Berkeley All Blues	-

August 31	Oregon Sports Union	7-48	San Diego Surfers	-

August 31	Twin Cities Amazons	22-45	Atlanta Harlequins	-

September 01	New York Rugby Club	31-5	Chicago North Shore Rugby	-

Bye/s: Beantown RFC & Glendale Merlins

=== Week 4 ===
September 7	Berkeley All Blues	17 - 19	Glendale Merlins	-

September 7	San Diego Surfers	16 - 40	Life West Gladiatrix	-

September 7	Chicago North Shore Rugby	3 - 10	Beantown RFC	-

September 8	Twin Cities Amazon	39 - 20	New York Rugby Club	-

Bye/s: Atlanta Harlequins & Oregon Sports Union

=== Week 5 ===
September 14	Berkeley All Blues	24 - 18	San Diego Surfers	-

September 14	Glendale Merlins	98 - 0	Oregon Sports Union	-

September 14	Beantown RFC	3 - 22	New York Rugby Club	-

September 15	Chicago North Shore Rugby	7 - 22	Atlanta Harlequins	-

Bye/s: Twin Cities Amazons & Life West Gladiatrix

=== Week 6 ===
September 21	Life West Gladiatrix	29 - 31	Glendale Merlins	-

September 21	Oregon Sports Union	7 - 34	Berkeley All Blues	-

September 21	Atlanta Harlequins	34 - 12	Beantown RFC	-

September 22	Twin Cities Amazon	56 - 17	Chicago North Shore Rugby	-

Bye/s: New York Rugby Club & San Diego Surfers

=== Week 7 ===
September 28	Berkeley All Blues	14 - 15	Life West Gladiatrix	-

September 28	San Diego Surfers	58 - 0	Oregon Sports Union	-

September 29	Twin Cities Amazon	20 - 22	Beantown RFC	-

September 29	New York Rugby Club	12 - 51	Atlanta Harlequins	-

Bye/s: Chicago North Shore Rugby & Glendale Merlins

=== Week 8 ===
October 5	Glendale Merlins	57 - 12	Berkeley All Blues	-

October 5	Life West Gladiatrix	59 -10	San Diego Surfers	-

October 5	Atlanta Harlequins	62 - 15	Twin Cities Amazon	-

October 6	Chicago North Shore Rugby	12 - 38	New York Rugby Club	-

Bye/s: Beantown RFC & Oregon Sports Union

=== Week 9 ===
October 19	San Diego Surfers	36 - 20	Berkeley All Blues	-

October 19	Oregon Sports Union	12 - 41	Glendale Merlins	-

October 19	Beantown RFC	39 - 7	Chicago North Shore Rugby	-

October 20	New York Rugby Club	36 - 17	Twin Cities Amazon	-

Bye/s: Atlanta Harlequins & Life West Gladiatrix

=== Week 10 ===
October 26	Glendale Merlins	38 - 12	San Diego Surfers	-

October 26	Oregon Sports Union	21 - 55	Life West Gladiatrix	-

October 26	Atlanta Harlequins	49 - 0	Chicago North Shore Rugby	-

October 27	New York Rugby Club	32 - 12	Beantown RFC	-

Bye/s: Twin Cities Amazons & Berkeley All Blues

== Playoffs ==
=== Bowl Competition ===
November 1	San Diego Surfers	55 - 12	Chicago North Shore Rugby

November 1	Twin Cities Amazons	33 - 46	Oregon Sports Union

November 1	Beantown RFC	0 - 38	Berkeley All Blues

==== 9th Place Final ====
November 3	Twin Cities Amazons	33 - 25	Chicago North Shore Rugby

==== 7th Place Final ====
November 3	Beantown RFC	22 - 33	Oregon Sports Union

==== 5th Place Final ====
November 3	Berkeley All Blues	22 - 31	San Diego Surfers

=== Cup Competition ===
Semi-finals
Atlanta Harlequins	15
Glendale Merlins	35
Life West Gladiatrix	34
New York Rugby Club	31

Final
Glendale Merlins	39
Life West Gladiatrix	31
Third place
Atlanta Harlequins	20
New York Rugby Club	26

==== Semifinals ====
November 1	Atlanta Harlequins	15 - 35	Glendale Merlins

November 1	Life West Gladiatrix	34 - 31	New York Rugby Club

==== 3rd Place Final ====
November 3	Atlanta Harlequins	20 - 26	New York Rugby Club

==== Grand Final ====
November 3

Glendale Merlins	39 - 31	Life West Gladiatrix

== See also ==
- Major League Rugby
- United States women's national rugby sevens team
- United States women's national rugby union team
