= Sarah Levy (rugby union) =

American rugby union player and Olympic rugby medalist

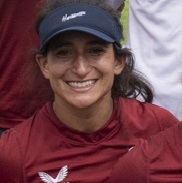
- Levy in 2024
- Born: December 27, 1995 (age 30) Cape Town, South Africa
- Height: 5 ft 8 in (173 cm)

Rugby union career
- Position(s): Hooker, winger, centre, or prop
Senior career
Years	Team	Apps	(Points)
- San Diego Surfers
- New York Rugby Club
- Barbarians F.C
International career
Years	Team	Apps	(Points)
- United States
National sevens team
Years	Team		Comps
- United States
Medal record
Women's rugby sevens
Representing United States
Olympic Games
Bronze medal – third place	2024 Paris	Team competition

Sarah Levy (/ˈliːvi/ LEE-vee; born December 27, 1995) is an American rugby union and rugby sevens player. She plays the wing position in the fifteens, and plays the positions of hooker, winger, centre, or prop in the sevens. At the 2024 Paris Olympics, Levy competed in the women's rugby sevens tournament on the bronze medal–winning United States team.

== Early life ==
Levy was born in Cape Town, South Africa, the daughter of a father from South Africa (Denis Levy) and mother from the United States (Susan), and is Jewish. Her father played rugby, and her great-uncle played rugby for the South African rugby union team Western Province. Her paternal great-grandfather Louis Babrow, who was an opponent of South African apartheid, played for the South Africa national rugby union team (the Springboks) in the 1930s.

Levy and her family moved to Israel when she was two, and a few years later moved to San Diego, California. She went to pre-school at the San Diego JCC, and attended University City High School. She competed in cross-country, track, golf, and soccer.

Levy attended Northeastern University, and graduated in 2018 with a Bachelor of Science in Health Science. She then spent a year working for a Connecticut physical therapy clinic, before applying to the University of Saint Augustine in San Marcos, California to pursue her Doctorate in Physical Therapy. She has continued her education throughout her professional rugby career, at times taking classes on nights and weekends in order to accommodate the team's full-time training schedule. She plans to graduate in August 2025.

== Rugby career ==
Levy first played rugby when she was 18 years of age at Northeastern University, for whom she played rugby union and rugby sevens. She competed for the San Diego Surfers and the New York Rugby Club (the oldest rugby club in the nation) rugby union clubs of the Women's Premier League. She also played for the British-based invitational Barbarian F.C., for which her great-grandfather had also played.

In 2018, Levy was asked to play for USA Rugby's fifteens team, the USA Women's Eagles. She earned her first cap against England.

She switched to rugby sevens after she was asked to play for the U.S. sevens camp. Although she plays the wing position in the fifteens, she plays the positions of hooker, winger, centre, or prop in the sevens. In 2022, she was asked to join the USA Sevens Residency, and she debuted in the 2022 World Rugby Sevens Series in Málaga, Spain. That year she also began working with coach Zack Test, who is a past Olympian and was the national team's assistant coach.

Levy specializes as an aerialist, using her length, timing, and ball-tracking skills to win her team additional possessions during kick-offs and line-outs.

=== 2024 Paris Olympics ===
Levy competed at the 2024 Paris Olympics as part of the United States women's national rugby sevens team in the women's rugby sevens tournament, in July 2024. At the time, Team USA was fourth in the world rankings. The team won its first two matches, defeating Japan and Brazil, and qualified for the quarter-finals, with Levy scoring in her first match. The team went on to win the bronze medal.

== See also ==
- List of select Jewish rugby union footballers
- List of Jewish Olympic medalists
