= Kathy Flores =

US international rugby union player (1955–2021)

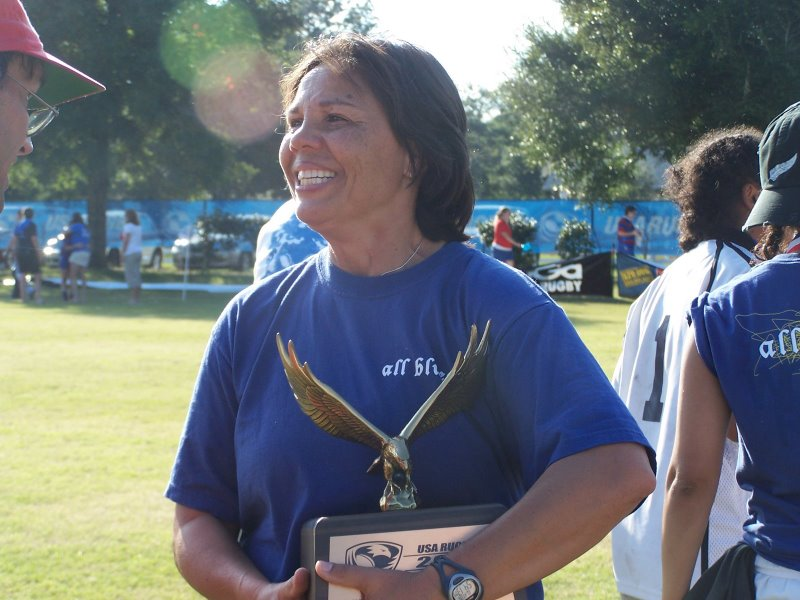
- Flores holding 2007 U.S. Club National Championship trophy, Florida
- Born: February 7, 1955 Philadelphia, Pennsylvania
- Died: October 21, 2021 (aged 66) Providence, Rhode Island
- Height: 5 ft 5 in (165 cm)

Rugby union career
- Position(s): Number eight Scrum-half
Senior career
Years	Team	Apps	(Points)
1994-1998	Berkeley All Blues		
International career
Years	Team	Apps	(Points)
1987-1994	United States		
Coaching career
- Years: Team
- 2002–2011: United States
- 1998–2007: Berkeley All Blues
- 2013-2021: Brown University

Kathleen Flores (February 7, 1955 – October 21, 2021) was an American rugby union player who was the head coach of the U.S. women's national team until January 2011 and the head coach of the Brown women's rugby team. Past coaching tenures include Bay Area Touring Side (BATS) Rugby Club, the SF FOG men and the Berkeley All Blues. She played rugby from 1978 to 1998 for Florida State University, the Berkeley All Blues Women's Rugby Club and U.S. women's national team. She started coaching for the Berkeley All Blues 1998 and had been head coach and administrator for the U.S. women's national team since 2003. She began coaching the women's rugby team at Brown University in the fall of 2013, following the retirement of Kerri Heffernan. During her time in Rhode Island, she also coached the Providence Women's Rugby team. She was able to bring them to several division 2 championships.

== Early life and education ==
Kathleen Theresa Flores was born to Joseph and Catherine Flores on February 7, 1955, in Philadelphia, Pennsylvania. She attended Monmouth Regional High School in New Jersey, where she played field hockey, basketball and ran track. She attended East Stroudsburg University of Pennsylvania and won the javelin throw event at the Eastern Association for Intercollegiate Athletics for Women in 1976 and 1977. She also played guard on the varsity basketball team. Flores graduated with her degree in physical education in 1977. In 1997, Flores was inducted into the ESU hall of fame for her athletic excellence during her undergraduate years.

In 1978, Flores began a master's program in exercise physiology at Florida State University.

== Rugby career ==
=== Club level playing ===
While attending Florida State University, Flores was drawn to the women's rugby team based on her past experience as a basketball and track athlete. She played at number eight and scrum-half for the Seminoles and won five Division 1 national titles while there. Because there was no distinction between the college/club level for women's rugby at the time, FSU competed as a club team, and Flores served as the team's captain and a player/coach up into the early 1990s.

In 1994, Flores moved to the San Francisco Bay Area with Jen Crawford, her National Team teammate and partner at the time, where she started playing and coaching for the Berkeley All Blues.

=== National level playing ===
Beginning in 1985, Flores toured throughout England and France as a captain of the first unofficial U.S. national team, known as WIVERN (Women's International Vagabonds, Emissaries, and Rugby Nomads). The U.S. Women's National Team made its first official international appearance playing Canada in 1987, with Flores at number eight and captain; the Eagles defeated Canada by 22–3, one try scored by Flores.

In 1991, Flores played number eight on the Women's National Team competing in the first Women's Rugby World Cup at Cardiff Arms Park in Wales. The team compiled a 7–1 record and went on to win the championship again England's national team. Flores played as a hooker and flanker in the second Rugby World Cup in 1994.

=== Coaching ===
In 1998, Flores officially retired from playing rugby, and continued as the Berkeley All Blues head coach. She also coached the Pacific Coast Grizzlies, a regional all-star team, from 1995 to 2002. From 1999 to 2003, she coached the University of California, Berkeley women's rugby team, bringing them to their first Sweet 16 appearance in 2001. In 2000, Flores was appointed as the Development Officer for the Women's National Team, and from 2002 to 2010, she served as the head coach. As the first woman and woman of color to coach a national team, she led them to fifth-place finishes in the 2006 and 2010 Rugby World Cup. In 2007, she retired as head coach of the All Blues to focus on the national team, but returned briefly for the 2011 season. The All Blues won a total of eleven national championship titles with Flores as a player and coach.

In 2009, she coached the University of San Francisco women's rugby team. From 2011 to 2013, Flores coached the San Francisco Fog, a gay men's rugby team.

Flores played a key role in the 2009 founding of the Women's Premier League (WPL), a high-level rugby league in the United States.

In 2013, Flores began coaching the Brown University women's rugby team through its infancy as an NCAA Division I team in 2014. She was awarded the Female Coach of the Year Award by USA Rugby after her first varsity season with the team, when they had a 9–1 overall record.

== Death ==
Flores identified as a lesbian. Flores died from colon cancer on October 21, 2021, at the age of 66 in Providence.

== Legacy ==
Flores was inducted into the World Rugby Hall of Fame in a special ceremony during the 2021 Rugby World Cup semi-finals at Eden Park on 5 November 2022. She had previously been inducted into the U.S. Rugby Hall of Fame as an individual in 2016, and as a member of the 1991 World Cup Team in 2017.

In 2022, two awards were established by the U.S. Women's Rugby Foundation and the Women's Premier League: the Kathy Flores Lifetime Achievement Award and the Kathy Flores Heart of the WPL Award.

== Honors and awards ==
- 2001: Coach of the Year, Women's Sports Foundation
- 2003: Personality of the Year Award, International Rugby Board
- 2006: Pioneer of the Women's Game, Rugby Football Union
- She was an honorable mention for the list of the ten greatest North American rugby players.
- 2014: Female Coach of the Year, USA Rugby
- 2016: U.S. Rugby Hall of Fame inductee
- 2016: Woman of Achievement, YWCA Rhode Island
- 2017: U.S. Rugby Hall of Fame inductees: 1991 USA Eagles Women's World Cup squad member
