= Kathryn Augustyn =

American rugby union player

Katy Augustyn
- Born: June 29, 1984 (age 42)
- Education: Northeastern University

Rugby union career
- Position: Hooker
Senior career
Years	Team	Apps	(Points)
-	Berkeley All Blues		
International career
Years	Team	Apps	(Points)
2012-	United States	35	

Kathryn Augustyn (born June 29, 1984) is an American rugby union player. She made her debut for the United States in 2012. She was named in the Eagles 2017 Women's Rugby World Cup squad. She also represented the United States at the 2014 Women's Rugby World Cup.
