= Life West Gladiatrix =

- Founded: 2014
- Location: Hayward, California
- Coach: Adriaan Ferris
- League: Women's Premier League

Official website
- www.lifewestrugby.com

Life West Gladiatrix are a women's rugby union club based in Hayward, California, United States. The Gladiatrix are named after ancient female Gladiators who were fierce and ruthless in combat and were the equivalent of their male counterparts. They were formed in the fall of 2014 and took the field for the first time in January 2015.

They have won several National Championship titles since then, they won the Division 2 championships in 2016 and 2026, while adding Division 1 championships in 2017 and 2018. 2019 saw them entering the Women's Premier League for the first time and reaching the finals.

== History ==
=== Life West Rugby ===
Dr. Brian Kelly (former President of Life Chiropractic College West) and his colleague Dr. Bruce Chester, established Life West Rugby in late 2013. Dr. Kelly grew up in New Zealand and wanted to establish a top-level rugby program which was realized on January 11, 2014, when the Life West Men's team, the Gladiators, played their first ever league match.

Dr. Kelly wanted to develop a program from the beginning that showcased excellence in rugby and chiropractic. He also wanted to enhance college pride and introduce chiropractic to a wider community. The program provided opportunities for students, alumni, chiropractors and the local community to be involved with the team.
