= Amy Westerman =

- Born: May 12 Lancaster, PA
- Height: 5 ft 6 in (168 cm)

Rugby union career
- Position(s): Fullback, Wing, Inside Center, Outside Center, Flyhalf
Senior career
Years	Team	Apps	(Points)
1989-1996	Beantown WRFC		(0)
1996-1997	Old Gold RFC		(0)
1997-1998	Boston WRFC		(0)
1998-1999	Maryland Stingers		(0)
International career
Years	Team	Apps	(Points)
1992-1998	United States	14	(104)

Amy Westerman is an American former rugby union player. She represented the United States at the 1994 and 1998 Rugby World Cup's. She played Inside Center, Outside Center, Wing, Flyhalf, and Fullback for the Eagles; Fullback, Inside Center, and Wing for Old Gold RFC, Boston WRFC, Maryland Stingers and Beantown RFC.

Westerman scored six tries in the Eagles 121–0 trouncing of Japan at the 1994 World Cup. She later scored a hat trick against Ireland in their quarter-final encounter.

At the 1998 World Cup, Westerman scored a hat trick and made two conversions against Russia. She later scored one of six tries in their 46–6 semi-final victory over Canada.

Westerman has scored 14 tries in seven Rugby World Cup appearances.
