= Krista McFarren =

- Born: 15 April 1961 (age 65)
- Height: 1.68 m (5 ft 6 in)

Rugby union career
- Position: Wing
Senior career
| Years | Team | Apps | (Points) |
| 1985–1990 | Maryland Stingers | | |
| 1990–1994 | New Orleans Halfmoons | | |
| 1994–2003 | Maryland Stingers | | |
International career
| Years | Team | Apps | (Points) |
| 1989–1994 | United States | | |
National sevens team
| Years | Team | | Comps |
| 1997, 2001 | United States | | |
Coaching career
- Years: Team
- 2006, 2010: United States Assistant Backs Coach

Krista McFarren (born 15 April 1961) is a former American rugby union player and athlete. She was a radiologist in the United States Air Force and rose to the rank of Lt. Colonel before she retired from active duty in 2001.

== Biography ==
McFarren began her athletic career in field hockey and earned a field hockey scholarship to Indiana State in 1978. She excelled not only in field hockey, but in badminton and softball as well and was named Indiana State Woman Athlete of the Year in 1982. She was a GTE Academic All-American and graduated cum laude in 1983 with a Bachelor of Science degree in medical technology and a minor in mathematics.

After graduating from Indiana State, she was admitted to the Uniformed Services University of the Health Sciences where she earned her Doctor of Medicine degree. McFarren spent 20 years in the Air Force.

=== Rugby career ===
McFarren began her rugby career playing for Maryland Stingers from 1985 to 1990. She then played for the New Orleans Halfmoons from 1990 to 1994 before returning to Maryland Stingers.

McFarren was a member of the United States squad that won the inaugural 1991 Women's Rugby World Cup in Wales. She was also selected for the 1994 and 1998 World Cup Teams.

She featured for the USA Women's Eagles Sevens at the 2001 Hong Kong Women's Sevens. She was a part of the coaching staff for the 2006 and 2010 World Cups.

McFarren and the 1991 World Cup squad were inducted into the United States Rugby Hall of Fame in 2017. In 2019 she was inducted into the Texas Rugby Hall of Fame in Allen, Texas.
