= Patty Jervey =

American rugby union player

- Born: March 29, 1964 (age 62)
- Height: 1.63 m (5 ft 4 in)

Rugby union career
- Position: Loose forward
International career
Years	Team	Apps	(Points)
1989-2006	United States	40	(178)

Patricia "Patty" Marie Jervey (born March 29, 1964) is an American former rugby union player. She appeared in five Women's World Cups for the United States. She was a member of the Eagles squad to win the inaugural 1991 Women's Rugby World Cup. The 2006 Women's Rugby World Cup was her last appearance for the Eagles. Retiring with 178 points and 38 tries, Jervey is considered one of the ten greatest North American women rugby players.

Jervey was inducted into the IRB Hall of Fame on November 18, 2014. She was one of six women to be inducted.
