= Beantown RFC =

- Full name: Beantown Rugby Football Club
- Founded: 1976; 50 years ago
- League: Women's Premier League

Official website
- beantownrugby.com

Beantown RFC are a women's rugby union club based in Boston that competed in the Women's Premier League.

== History ==
The Beantown Rugby Football Club was founded in the fall of 1976. They have placed in the top five in every appearance in the National Championship Tournament since 1980 – except for 1984 where they finished seventh. They have won six National Championship titles.

Women's Premier League

When the Women's Premier League was formed in 2009, Beantown RFC was one of eight teams that kicked-off the inaugural season. In 2010, a Division 3 team was created and they won their inaugural season. The Division 3 side was then promoted to Division 2 in 2011 and competed alongside their WPL side at Nationals in 2012.

From 2014 to 2016, the teams were merged into one team to compete in Division 1 for 2017.
