= Jen Crawford =

American rugby union player

- Born: July 25, 1964 (age 62)
- Height: 170 cm (5 ft 7 in)
- Weight: 66 kg (146 lb)
- University: Stanford University

Rugby union career
- Position: Half
Amateur team(s)
Years	Team	Apps	(Points)
- Berkeley All Blues
International career
Years	Team	Apps	(Points)
1991–1998	United States	20	
National sevens team
Years	Team		Comps
–	United States		
Coaching career
- Years: Team
- –: Berkeley All Blues

Jennifer Crawford (born July 25, 1964) is an American former rugby union fifteens and sevens player. A former all-time leading Eagles tryscorer at the time of her retirement, Crawford is considered the finest female player produced by North America.

Crawford participated at the Women's Rugby World Cup in 1991, 1994, and 1998. At her last world cup, she captained the Eagles and earned her twentieth cap and she was the team's leading try-scorer. Crawford also led the Berkley All-Blues to nine consecutive USA Rugby National Women's Club championships as a player and assistant coach.

== Life ==
Crawford graduated from Stanford University.

== Honours ==
International Rugby Board awards

- World Rugby Hall of Fame Inductee Number 179: 2026
