= Glendale Merlins =

Rugby union club in Glendale, Colorado

(United States) Glendale Merlins
- Founded: 2006
- Location: Glendale, Denver, CO
- Ground: Infinity Park (Capacity: 5,000)
- President: Scott Smith
- Coach(es): Luke Gross & Kittery Wagner
- Captain(s): Zach Fenoglio & Sarah Chobot
- League(s): Pacific Rugby Premiership & Women's Premier League
1st kit	2nd kit

Glendale Merlins is an amateur rugby club based in the municipality of Glendale in Colorado, United States. The club was founded in 2006 and first played in 2007 under the name Glendale Raptors.

In 2017, a Glendale Raptors team was accepted into the professional Major League Rugby competition and the amateur Glendale teams changed their mascot from the Raptor to the Merlin, transitioning to the new brand before the inaugural season of Major League Rugby in 2018. The Glendale teams play at Infinity Park.

== History ==
The men's squad won the 2011 Division I Championship. They were 2014 runners-up in the inaugural season of the Pacific Rugby Premiership losing to the San Francisco Golden Gate RFC 39-38 on the last play. The team won the Pacific Rugby Premiership in 2015, defeating San Francisco Golden Gate by 25-11. They repeated the feat in 2016, winning the Pacific Rugby Premiership title by 44-20 against San Francisco Golden Gate at their home field, Infinity Park.

The women's squad advanced from USA Rugby's Division I into the Women's Premier League in 2012. They placed third in 2013, won back-to-back national championships in 2014 and 2015, and placed second in 2016, 2017, and 2018.

== Players ==
Five of Glendale's women's players - props Jamie Burke, Sarah Chobot, Sarah Wilson, hooker Kittery Wagner, and flyhalf Hannah Stolba - represented the U.S. team for the 2014 Women's Rugby World Cup.

Two of Glendale's men's players — hooker Zach Fenoglio and scrum half Niku Kruger — were named to the U.S. team for the 2015 Rugby World Cup.

Additionally, Iniki Fa'amausili played for the US U-20 national team that won the 2012 IRB Junior World Rugby Trophy held in Salt Lake City, Utah.

Three of Glendale's men's players represented the US national team at the 2011 Rugby World Cup: James Paterson, Nese Malifa, and Nic Johnson.

== See also ==
- Colorado Raptors
