= Berkeley All Blues =

US women's rugby union club, based in Berkeley, CA

- Founded: 1978; 48 years ago
- Location: Berkeley, California
- League: Women's Premier League

Official website
- www.berkeleyallblues.com

The Berkeley All Blues are a women's rugby union club based in Berkeley, California. They were founded in 1978 and are founding members of the Women's Premier League Rugby. They field three teams throughout the year, in the WPL, Division II, and in Sevens. The All Blues have won a total of 16 National Championships, they include the 2011 and 2012 Women's Premier League Championships and the 2011 and 2013 Women's Club 7s National Championships.

== Tournament History ==
=== Women's Premier League Rugby ===
Women's Premier League
Year	Rank
2022	Champions
2019	6th
2018	5th
2017	5th
2016	7th
2015	Runner-up
2014	3rd
2013	Runner-up
2012	Champions
2011	Champions
2010	3rd
2009	Runner-up

=== USA Rugby Club 7s ===
Year	Rank
2016	8th
2015	4th
2014	3rd
2013	Champions
2012	5th - Plate Champions
2011	Champions

== Notable people ==
Player/Coach	Contribution	Ref
Kathy Flores	Former coach and player: Player-coach (1994–1997); Coach (1998–2007)	
Jen Crawford	Former coach and player	
Kathryn Augustyn	Former player	
Erin Overcash	Former player	
