= San Diego Surfers =

- Founded: 1975
- Location: San Diego, California
- Ground: Robb Athletic Field
- League: Women's Premier League

Official website
- www.sdsurfersrugby.com

The San Diego Surfers (officially the San Diego Surfers Women's Rugby Club) are a women's rugby union club based in San Diego, California, that competes in Women's Premier League Rugby (WPL). The club was founded in 1975.

== History ==
The club has been members of the Women's Premier League Rugby (WPL) since 2011, when the team earned promotion from Division I. The Surfers field three teams throughout the year, one each in the WPL, Division I, and Sevens.

The Surfers' won the WPL National Championship in 2016 and 2018, and the USA Rugby Club 7s National Championship in 2012, 2014, 2018 and 2019.

== Notable players ==
- Sarah Levy (born 1995), Olympic bronze medalist, rugby union and rugby sevens player
