= Women's Premier League (rugby) =

Annual American rugby union competition

Women's Premier League Rugby
- Current season or competition: 2022 Women's Premier League Rugby season
- Sport: Rugby union
- Inaugural season: 2009
- Ceased: 2024
- Number of teams: 7
- Country: United States (USA Rugby)
- Champions: Colorado Gray Wolves (2024)
- Most titles: Colorado Gray Wolves (5 titles)
- Website: wplrugby.org
- Broadcast partner: YouTube Page

The Women's Premier League (WPL) was the top annual American women's rugby union competition. It was player-run and operated in partnership with USA Rugby. The league was founded in 2009 and had its last season in 2024.

The League initially began from 8 different Division 1 Women's Sides coming together in 2009. In 2017, the League grew to 10 clubs. In 2023, the League reduced their club numbers to 7.

The 2020 Season was canceled on June 1, 2020 due to the worldwide coronavirus pandemic. The League started up again in 2022.

The League was superseded by the Women's Elite Rugby league, which began in 2025.

== History ==
=== Founding ===
The WPL was founded in 2009 with 8 of the top Division 1 Women's Teams in the US. The organization was created with the leadership of Kathy Flores, USA Eagle and Head Coach of the USA Women's Team, and Alex Williams in order to grow the Women's game and develop more potential players for the Women's National Team.

The League began with 8 clubs: Beantown Rugby, Berkeley All Blues, New York Rugby Club, Washington DC Furies, Twin City Amazons, Keystone Rugby Club, Minnesota Valkyries, and Oregon Sports Union (ORSU).

=== Promotion and relegation ===
In 2010, the league began its promotion/relegation opportunities for Division 1 Teams to join the WPL in 2010, whereby the top-ranked Division 1 Team would challenge the bottom-ranked WPL Team for their position in the WPL. From the end of the 2016 Season until the 2019 season, the WPL stopped its relegation due to their expansion.

=== Expansion and beyond ===
For the 2017 Season, the WPL allowed for the Leagues first expansion, growing the League from 8 to 10 teams, adding Beantown RFC and Chicago North Shore Rugby into the competition.

In 2017, the WPL created their Inaugural All-Stars Team, composed of top players from the season who would compete in preparation for the 2017 Women's Rugby World Cup. In 2018, the WPL decided to create two All-Star Teams, one for the Eastern Conference and one for the Western Conference, allowing more players to compete at the top level of competition.

On June 1, 2020, the 2020 Season was postponed due to the coronavirus pandemic. The season was later cancelled on July 8, 2020 and the WPL has resumed in 2022.

=== Professionalism ===
In 2023, the WPL changed their season schedule outline and moved forward towards a more professional structure. Unfortunately, this led to three teams, the San Diego Surfers, Atlanta Harlequins, and Oregon Sports Union, specifically, to leave the WPL to focus on their club teams. With that, the Conference structure that was in place throughout most of the WPL's timeline was left behind for a cohesive league structure.

The Women's Elite Rugby (WER) league officially began in March of 2025. This launch also brought the closing of the Women's Premier Rugby (WPL) league making the 2024 season the final WPL season.

== Women's Premier League teams ==
=== Map ===
Locations of teams in Women's Premier League
Current Teams

=== Current teams ===
Team	Metro Area	Joined	Stadium	Coach	Website
Beantown RFC	Boston, Massachusetts	2009	Union Point Sports Complex	Kelly Seary	http://beantownrugby.com/
Berkeley All Blues	Berkeley, California	2009	Gabes Field	Theo Bennett	http://berkeleyallblues.com/
Chicago North Shore Rugby	Chicago, Illinois	2017	CIBC Fire Pitch	Noby Takaki, Lauren Trout	http://www.northshorerugby.com/
Colorado Gray Wolves	Denver, Colorado	2012	Infinity Park	Kittery Ruiz	https://www.cograywolves.com/
Life West Gladiatrix	Hayward, California	2019	Ray Sheeran Field	Adriaan Ferris	https://www.lifewestrugby.com/womens/
New York Rugby Club	New York, New York	2009	Randall's Island	James English	http://newyorkrugby.com/
Twin Cities Amazons	Minneapolis-St. Paul, Minnesota	2009	Eagan Community Center	Roger Bruggemeyer	http://www.amazonrugby.org/

=== Timeline ===
Current Members Previous Team Name Past Members

=== Promotion/relegation ===
Year	Relegated Team (Out)	Promoted Team (In)
2011	Oregon Sports Union	San Diego Surfers
2012	Minnesota Valkyries	Glendale Raptors
2013	Keystone Rugby Club	Atlanta Harlequins
2014	Beantown RFC	Oregon Sports Union
2015	–	–
2016	–	–
2017	N/A	+ Chicago North Shore Rugby + Beantown RFC
2018	N/A	N/A
2019	Washington DC Furies	Life West Gladiatrix
2020	(Season Cancelled)	(Season Cancelled)
2021	(Season Cancelled)	(Season Cancelled)
2022	San Diego Surfers; Atlanta Harlequins; Oregon Sports Union	N/A
2023	N/A	N/A
2024	N/A	N/A

=== Former teams ===
Team	Metro Area	Joined	Left	Website
DC Furies	Washington DC	2009	2018	https://dcfuries.com/
Keystone	Philadelphia, Pennsylvania	2009	2012	http://keystonerugby.org/
Minnesota Valkyries	Minneapolis, Minnesota	2009	2011	http://www.valkyriesrugby.org/
San Diego Surfers	San Diego, California	2011	2022	http://sdsurfersrugby.com/
Atlanta Harlequins	Atlanta, Georgia	2013	2022	http://ahwrfc.com
Oregon Sports Union	Portland, Oregon	2014	2022	http://orsu.org/

== League champions ==
Year	Final		
Year	Champion	Score	Runner-up
2009	New York Rugby Club	20–10	Berkeley All Blues
2010	New York Rugby Club	33–8	Beantown RFC
2011	Berkeley All Blues	17–8	Twin Cities Amazons
2012	Berkeley All Blues	39–5	Glendale Raptors
2013	Twin Cities Amazons	25–12	Berkeley All Blues
2014	Glendale Raptors	16–15	Twin Cities Amazons
2015	Glendale Raptors	26–17	Berkeley All Blues
2016	San Diego Surfers	26–16	Glendale Raptors
2017	New York Rugby Club	27–26	Glendale Merlins
2018	San Diego Surfers	34–28	Glendale Merlins
2019	Glendale Merlins	39–31	Life West Gladiatrix
2020	Not held due to COVID-19		
2021	Not held due to COVID-19		
2022	Berkeley All Blues	29–7	Beantown RFC
2023	Colorado Gray Wolves	29–24	Berkeley All Blues
2024	Colorado Gray Wolves	31–27	Berkeley All Blues

== See also ==
- Major League Rugby
- Women's Elite Rugby
- 2011 Women's Premier League Rugby season
- United States women's national rugby sevens team
- United States women's national rugby union team
