= New York Rugby Club =

Rugby union club in New York

- Full name: New York Rugby Club
- Nickname: NYRC
- Founded: 1929
- Location: Manhattan, New York, NY
- Coach: Karameli Tiffany Faʻaeʻe (former)
- League(s): Women's Premier League; Empire Geographical Union

Official website
- www.newyorkrugby.nyc

The New York Rugby Club is a rugby union club in New York. It is the oldest rugby club in the United States, and fields Division I Men's and Women's teams, U-19 Boy's and U-19 Girls teams, two old boy teams, one of which belongs to the non-competitive "Golden Oldies".

== History ==
The NYRC was founded to continue a rugby tradition that dates back to the formation of the NYRFC in 1929. The original club was formed in 1929 as the New York Nomads. They subsequently began competing as the New York Rugby Football Club (New York RFC). The New York RFC played a principal role in the development of the Eastern Rugby Union. It was the only team in the United States to be accepted for membership in the Rugby Union for the 1932-33 international directory and in 1933, hosted the Cambridge University Vandals, the first European club to tour the United States.

The New York RFC continued to compete successfully until the beginning of World War II. It disbanded during the War and resumed activities afterward.

In 1957, the New York RFC created the New York Rugby Football Club, Inc. (NYRFC) under the Membership Corporations Law of New York State. In 1959, the NYRFC organized its first seven-a-side rugby tournament. Since then "New York Sevens" has been conducted annually on the first Saturday following the Thanksgiving Holiday and grown into the largest international sevens tournament in the United States.

During the 1960s and 1970s the NYRFC was a dominant force in the Eastern United States. In 1977, The NYRFC made a Winter-tour contest of matches in the Caribbean and Florida. NYRFC played the Freeport, Bahamas team and the team from Nassau, Bahamas. The Winter tour ended with the NYRFC playing very good Miami RFC team. In 1982, the NYRFC merged with Eastside RFC (formerly Hunter College RFC). The NYRFC was the first United States team to be invited to compete in Scandinavia, touring Denmark in 1986. The team competed in Mexico in 1986, Japan, Thailand, Italy and Philippines in 1989, Bahamas in 1991, Argentina and Brazil in 1992, England, Ireland and Wales in 1994 and Spain in 1997.

=== Women's team ===
In 1997, the NYRFC voted to field a women's team and offered playing membership to former players of the Gotham Women's Rugby Club.

The New York Rugby Club competes as part of the Empire Geographical Union, and USA Rugby. The NYRC Women won the USA Rugby Women's Div I National Championship in 2006. In 2009 the NYRC Women’s Team won the inaugural season of the WPL.

== Notable players ==
- Sarah Levy (born 1995), Olympic bronze medalist, rugby union and rugby sevens player
- Tess Feury (born 1996), United States women's national rugby union team player

== Records ==
=== Men's All Time Points Leaders ===
Player	Caps	Position	Points
Tim Salmon	9	Half-Back	83
Rumi Easter	12	Wing	65
Tim Edmonds	11	Fullback	55
Andy Munro-Lott	10	Half-Back	48
Liam Hawkins	9	Back Row	40
Patrick McLaughlin	8	Scrum-Half	36
Armando Moncayo	6	Scrum-Half	30
Daniel Bamford	13	Back Row	25
Ben Booth	6	Center	25
Nelson Cooper	8	Fullback	25
Craig Sinclair	12	Center	25
