= Diane (given name) =

Alternative spellings include Daiane, Dianne, Dian, Diahann, Dyan, Dyanne, and Dyane. See also Di, Dianna, Deanna, Deeann, and Diana

Diane is a feminine given name. Notable people with the name include:

== Notable people ==
- Diane, Duchess of Württemberg (born 1940), French-German painter, sculptor, writer, and philanthropist
- Diane Abbott (born 1953), British politician
- Diane Ablonczy (born 1949), Canadian politician
- Diane Ackerman (born 1948), American poet, essayist, and naturalist
- Diane Adams, Canadian curler
- Diane Adehm (born 1970), Luxembourgish politician
- Diane Airey (born 1943), Australian politician
- Diane Allahgreen (born 1975), British hurdler
- Diane Allen (born 1948), American politician
- Diane Marie Amann, American law professor
- Diane Andersen (born 1934), Belgian pianist
- Diane Anderson (born 1960), American politician
- Diane Anderson-Minshall (born 1968), American journalist
- Diane Arbus (1923–1971), American photographer
- Diane Archie, Canadian politician
- Diane Arkenstone (born 1960), musical artist
- Diane Armstrong (born 1939), Australian writer
- Diane Asitimbay, American writer
- Diane Atkinson, British historian and writer
- Diane Austin-Broos (born 1946), Australian anthropologist
- Diane Awerbuck (born 1974), South African novelist
- Diane Ayala Goldner (born 1956), American actress
- Diane Bailey, English amateur golfer
- Diane Baker (born 1938), American actress
- Diane Barbeau (1961–2021), Canadian politician
- Diane Barber, American cell physiologist and biologist
- Diane Barnard, English professional golfer
- Diane Barwick (1938–1986), Canadian anthropologist
- Diane Barz (1943–2014), American judge
- Diane Bassham, plant physiologist and researcher
- Diane Beamer (born 1960), Australian politician
- Diane E. Beaver, American lawyer
- Diane M. Becker (1943–2021), American nurse and public health scientist
- Diane Meredith Belcher (born 1960), American concert organist, teacher and church musician
- Diane Bell, several people
- Diane Bellemare (born 1949), Canadian politician
- Diane E. Benson (born 1954), American politician
- Diane Bertrand (born 1951), French film director
- Diane Bilyeu (born 1935), American politician and realtor from Idaho
- Diane F. Birt (born 1949), American nutritionist
- Diane Birch (born 1983), American singer-songwriter
- Diane Bish (born 1941), American organist, composer, conductor, and producer
- Diane Black (born 1951), American politician
- Diane Blair (1938–2000), American political scientist
- Diane Blair-Sherlock, American politician
- Diane Bond (born 1945), American actress
- Diane Borg (born 1990), Maltese sprinter
- Diane Borsato, Canadian visual artist
- Diane Bourgeois (born 1949), Canadian politician
- Diane Bracalente (born 1963), American field hockey player
- Diane Braceland (born 1950), American rower
- Diane Bragg, American pole vaulter
- Diane Brand, New Zealand architecture academic
- Diane Brandt (1938–2010), American politician
- Diane Brentari, American linguist
- Diane Brewster (1931–1991), American actress
- Diane Briars, American mathematics educator
- Diane Mary Bridson (born 1942), British botanist
- Diane Brown, New Zealand novelist and poet
- Diane Brown (curling) (born 1946), American curler and coach
- Diane L. Browne, American author and singer
- Diane Jardine Bruce, Bishop Provisional of the Episcopal Diocese of West Missouri
- Diane Bui Duyet (born 1979), French New Caledonian swimmer
- Diane Burko, American painter
- Diane Burns (1956–2006), Anishinaabe and Chemehuevi artist
- Diane Cailhier (1947–2020), Canadian filmmaker
- Diane Caldwell (born 1988), Irish footballer
- Diane T. Capehart, American Virgin Islander politician
- Diane Cardwell, American journalist
- Diane Carey (born 1954), American writer
- Diane Carlson Evans, American army nurse
- Diane Carr (born 1946), American artist
- Diane Cary, American actress
- Diane Chamberlain (born 1950), American author of adult fiction
- Diane Charlemagne (1964–2015), British musical artist
- Diane Charlie-Puna, Cook Islands public servant
- Diane Chase, Canadian singer
- Diane Zaino Chase, American archaeologist
- Diane Chen (born 1979), American figure skater
- Diane Chenery-Wickens (1959–2008), English makeup artist
- Diane Cilento (1932–2011), Australian actress
- Diane Clare (1938–2013), English actress
- Diane Claridge (born 1963), Bahamian mammalogist
- Diane Cluck, American singer-songwriter
- Diane Coates (1932–2021), British javelin thrower
- Diane Colley-Urquhart, Canadian politician
- Diane Collings (born 1959), New Zealand sport shooter
- Diane Atnally Conlin, American classicist and archaeologist
- Diane Cook, several people
- Diane Corcoran (1946–2023), US army nurse
- Diane Corner (born 1959), British ambassador
- Diane Coyle (born 1961), British economist
- Diane Craig (born 1949), Irish actress
- Diane Crespo, American film producer
- Diane Crump (1948–2026), American jockey
- Diane Cummins (born 1974), Canadian middle-distance runner
- Diane Curry (1938–2016), American operatic mezzo-soprano
- Diane Gabrielle Damas (1656–1715), French aristocrat
- Diane Damiano, American biomedical scientist and physical therapist
- Diane D'Aquila (born 1952), Canadian-American actress
- Diane Davis, American philosopher
- Diane De Courcy, Canadian politician
- Diane Deans (1958–2024), Canadian politician
- Diane Delano (1957–2024), American actress
- Diane Delin, American jazz violinist, composer and educator
- Diane Denish (born 1949), American politician
- Diane Denoir (born 1957), Uruguayan singer
- Diane Desfor (born 1955), American tennis player
- Diane Dezura (born 1958), Canadian curler and Olympic medalist
- Diane DiMassa, American feminist artist
- Diane Dimond (born 1952), American journalist
- Diane Disney Miller (1933–2013), elder child of Walt Disney and his wife Lillian Bounds Disney
- Diane Dixon (sprinter) (born 1964), American athlete
- Diane Dixon (politician), California State Politician
- Diane Dodds (born 1958), Northern Ireland politician
- Diane Donnelly (born 1965), American tennis player
- Diane Douglas, American politician
- Diane Downs (born 1955) American murderer
- Diane Drake, American screenwriter
- Diane Drufenbrock (1929–2013), American politician
- Diane Duane (born 1952), American writer
- Diane Ducret (born 1982), Franco-Belgian writer
- Diane Dufresne (born 1944), Canadian musical artist
- Diane Elam (born 1958), American feminist writer
- Diane Ellis (1909–1930), American actress
- Diane Elson (born 1946), British sociologist
- Diane English (born 1948), American film director
- Diane Erpelding (born 1982), Luxembourgish dressage rider
- Diane van Es (born 1999), Dutch athlete
- Diane Esmond (1910–1981), French painter
- Diane Etiennette (born 1988), Mauritian swimmer
- Diane L. Evans, geo-scientist at NASA's Jet Propulsion Laboratory
- Diane Fahey (born 1945), Australian poet
- Diane Falkenhagen, American artist and metal smith
- Diane Fanning (born 1950), American crime writer and author
- Diane Farr (born 1969), American actress, producer and writer
- Diane Farr (writer), American writer
- Diane Farrell (born 1955), American politician
- Diane Farrell (tennis) (born 1961), American tennis player
- Diane Felix (born 1953), American disc jockey and LGBT activist
- Diane Finegood, Canadian American chemical engineer
- Diane Fingleton (born 1947), Australian magistrate
- Diane Finley (born 1957), Canadian politician
- Diane Flacks, Canadian actress and writer
- Diane Fleri (born 1983), French-born Italian actress
- Diane Fletcher (born 1944), English actress
- Diane Follingstad, American psychologist and author
- Diane Fordney (1940–2022), American physician and sex therapist
- Diane Foster (sprinter) (1928–1999), Canadian sprinter
- Diane Foster (curler), Canadian curler
- Diane de France (1538–1619), daughter of Henry II of France
- Diane Francis (born 1946), American-born Canadian journalist
- Diane Francis (athlete) (born 1968), Saint Kitts and Nevis sprinter
- Diane Franklin (born 1962), American actress
- Diane Franklin (politician) (born 1956), American politician
- Diane Frolov, American television writer and producer
- Diane von Furstenberg (born 1946), Belgian fashion designer
- Diane Gaidry (1964–2019), American actress
- Diane Gamboa, American painter
- Diane Garnick (born 1967), American investment manager
- Diane Gashumba, Rwandan minister of health
- Diane Gaston, American novelist
- Diane Gayer (born 1952), Swiss architect
- Diane Geppi-Aikens (1962–2003), American lacrosse coach
- Diane Gerace (born 1943), Canadian high jumper, long jumper, and pentathlete
- Diane Gerencser (born 1972), Italian-Swiss figure skater
- Diane Ghirardo (born 1950), American architect and art historian
- Diane Giebel (born 1953), American swimmer
- Diane Gifford-Gonzalez, American archaeologist
- Diane Giguère (born 1937), Canadian writer living in Quebec
- Diane Gilbert Sypolt (born 1947), American judge
- Diane Gilliam Fisher, American poet
- Diane Gilman, several people
- Diane Gilpin, British technology shipping chief executive
- Diane Glancy (born 1941), American writer and professor
- D. G. K. Goldberg (1953–2005), American novelist
- Diane Goldman Kemper, American real estate investor
- Diane Goode (born 1949), American children's book author and illustrator
- Diane Gordon, American politician
- Diane Grayson (born 1948), English actress
- Diane Greene (born 1955), American businesswoman
- Diane Grendell (born 1945), American politician
- Diane Griffin, several people
- Diane Gromala (born 1960), Canadian computer scientist
- Diane Guérin (1948–2022), Canadian actress and singer
- Diane Guerrero (born 1986), Colombian-American actress
- Diane Gujarati (born 1969), American judge
- Diane de Guldencrone (1848–1930), French historian
- Diane Gushulak (born 1969), Canadian curler
- Diane Guthrie-Gresham (born 1971), Jamaican long jumper and heptathlete
- Diane Gutierrez-Scaccetti, Commissioner of the New Jersey Department of Transportation
- Diane Haigh (1949–2022), British architect
- Diane F. Halpern, American psychologist
- Diane Hamelin (born 1951), Canadian politician
- Diane Hansen, several people
- Diane Harkey (born 1951), American politician
- Diane Harper, American medical researcher
- Diane Hart (1926–2002), English actress
- Diane Hathaway (born 1954), American judge
- Diane Havlir, US leader of HIV/AIDS work
- Diane Hegarty (1942–2022), American religious leader
- Diane Henderson, American applied mathematician
- Diane Hendricks (born 1947), American billionaire businesswoman and film producer
- Diane Hildebrand (born 1945), American pop singer-songwriter
- Diane Hoh (born 1937), American author of young adult horror
- Diane Holl (born 1964), English motorsports engineer
- Diane Holland (1930–2009), British actress
- Diane Holmes, Canadian politician
- Diane Hoskins, American business executive and architect
- Diane Hubka (born 1957), American jazz guitarist and vocalist
- Diane Hughes, developmental psychologist
- Diane Humetewa (born 1964), American judge
- Diane Ibbotson, English artist
- Diane Itter (1946–1989), American fiber artist
- Diane James (born 1959), Brexit Party politician and former leader of the UK Independence Party
- Diane A. Jenkins (born 1946), American lawyer
- Diane Jergens (1935–2018), American actress
- Diane Jerome (born 1941), American canoeist
- Diane Johnsen, American judge
- Diane Johnson (born 1934), American journalist
- Diane Johnstone, Australian diplomat
- Diane Jones-Konihowski (born 1951), Canadian pentathlete
- Diane Juster (born 1946), Canadian singer-songwriter and composer
- Diane Karusisi, Rwandan economist and banker
- Diane Katsiaficas (born 1947), American visual artist
- Diane Keating (born 1940), Canadian writer
- Diane Keaton (1946–2025), American actress
- Diane Keen (born 1946), English actress
- Diane Kelly, several people
- Diane Kendal, British-born makeup artist
- Diane Kennedy, American CPA, speaker and financial writer
- Diane Kerr, Australian indigenous rights activist
- Diane Kingston (born 1966), English human rights defender
- Diane Kirkby (born 1948), Australian historian
- Diane Kochilas (born 1960), Greek American cookbook author and chef
- Diane Koenker, American historian
- Diane Koken, American politician
- Diané Mariam Koné (born 1953), Malian politician
- Diane Kroupa (born 1955), American attorney
- Diane Kruger (born 1976), German actress
- Diane Kunz (born 1952), American historian
- Diane Kurys (born 1948), French filmmaker and actress
- Diane Lacombe (born 1976), French swimmer
- Diane Ladd (1935–2025), American actress
- Diane Lamarre (born 1955), Canadian pharmacist and politician
- Diane Lambert, American statistician
- Diane Lamein (born 1979), Dutch handball player
- Diane Lamoureux (born 1954), Canadian professor, writer and essayist
- Diane Landry, Canadian kinetic artist
- Diane Lane (born 1965), American actress
- Diane Langley, American politician
- Diane Luby Lane, American writer and nonprofit executive
- Diane Luckey (1960–2022), American singer
- Diane Langmore, Australian historian
- Diane Langton (1944–2025), English actress and singer
- Diane Lanpher (born 1955), American politician
- Diane Lansley, English swimmer
- Diane Larsen-Freeman (born 1946), American linguist
- Diane Larson, American politician
- Diane Latiker, American community activist
- Diane Leather (1933–2018), British runner
- Diane Leblanc (born 1954), Canadian politician
- Diane Lebouthillier (born 1959), Canadian politician
- Diane Lee (born 1959), Taiwanese politician
- Diane Legault (born 1956), Canadian politician and dentist
- Diane Lemaire (1923–2012), Australian aeronautical engineer
- Diane Lemieux (born 1961), Canadian politician
- Diane Levin (born 1947), American author, educator and advocate
- Diane Lewis, several people
- Diane Leyre (born 1997), French beauty pageant contestant
- Diane Lillo-Martin, American linguist
- Diane Lim, economist and writer
- Diane Linkletter (1948–1969), daughter of Art Linkletter
- Diane Lipscombe (born 1960), British neuroscientist
- Diane Litman, American computer scientist
- Diane S. Littler, American phycologist
- Diane Lockward, American poet
- Diane Loeffler (1953–2019), American politician
- Diane Loranger (1920–2004), Canadian geologist and paleobotanist
- Diane Louoba (born 1983), Congolese handball player
- Diane Sher Lutovich (died 2004), American poet
- Diane Macedo (born 1982), American news personality
- Diane M. Mackie, social psychologist
- Diane MacKown, American photographer
- Diane Maclagan (born 1974), mathematician
- Diane Madl (born 1967), American field hockey player
- Diane Maliukaetau (born 1986), New Zealand rugby union player
- Diane Mantzaris (born 1962), Australian artist
- Diane de Margerie (1927–2023), French writer
- Diane Marleau (1943–2013), Canadian politician
- Diane Martel (1962–2025), American music video director
- Diane Martinez (born 1953), American politician
- Diane Massam, Canadian linguist
- Diane Matheson (born 1936), Canadian sprinter
- Diane Mathis, American immunologist
- Diane Mazloum (born 1980), French-Lebanese writer
- Diane McBain (1941–2022), American actress
- Diane McFarlin, American educator and author
- Diane McGifford (born 1945), Canadian politician
- Diane McKinney-Whetstone (born 1953), American novelist
- Diane McNaron (1947–2022), American musical artist
- Diane McWhorter (born 1952), American journalist and author
- Diane E. Meier (born 1952), American geriatrics
- Diane Menzies, New Zealand landscape architect
- Diane Michelle (born 1969), American voice actress
- Diane Middlebrook (1939–2007), American poet
- Diane Mitsch Bush (born 1950), American politician
- Diane Mizota (born 1973), American actress
- Diane Modahl (born 1966), English middle-distance runner
- Diane Mollenkopf, New Zealand academic
- Diane Montagna, American journalist and author
- Diane Morgan (born 1975), British actress, comedian and writer
- Diane Morrison (born 1958), American tennis player
- Diane Mott Davidson (born 1949), American novelist
- Diane Moy Quon, American film producer
- Diane Moyer (born 1958), American field hockey player
- Diane Muldrow, American author and editor
- Diane Munday (1931–2026), British political activist
- Diane Murphy (born 1964), American actress
- Diane Murray (born 1956), American taekwondo practitioner
- Diane Nash (born 1938), American civil rights activist
- Diane Bayegla Ndeme (born 1990), Cameroonian footballer
- Diane Neal (born 1976), American actress
- Diane Dezura (born 1958), Canadian curler
- Diane Nelson (businesswoman), American media executive
- Diane Nelson (businesswoman) (born 1968), American business executive
- Diane Neumaier (born 1946), American photographer
- Diane Ninemire (born 1957), American softball coach
- Diane Noomin (1947–2022), American comics artist
- Diane Nukuri (born 1984), Burundian-American long-distance runner
- Diane Nyland (1944–2014), Canadian actress, director and choreographer
- Diane Obomsawin (born 1959), Canadian author, illustrator and animated filmmaker
- Diane Ogibowski (born 1965), Canadian figure skater
- Diane Ogle (born 1965), Australian luger
- Diane Oliver (1943–1966), African-American writer
- Diane Orentlicher, American international law professor
- Diane Orihel, freshwater ecologist
- Diane Oxner (1928–2025), Canadian soprano and voice teacher
- Diane Papan (born 1963), American politician
- Diane Pappas (born 1970/1971), Democratic member of the Illinois House of Representatives
- Diane Paragas, American film and television director
- Diane Parish (born 1969), English actress
- Diane Parry (born 2002), French tennis player
- Diane Passage (born 1976), American woman from New York City
- Diane E. Pataki, American academic
- Diane Pathieu, American television anchor
- Diane Patrick, several people
- Diane Paul (born 1946), American historian of science
- Diane Paulus (born 1966), American theater and opera director
- Diane Pearson (1931–2017), British novelist and editor
- Diane Pearson (landscape architect), New Zealand landscape architecture
- Diane Pedgrift (born 1988), Scottish cricketer
- Diane Pernet, French journalist
- Diane Pershing (born 1943), American voice actress
- Diane de Poitiers (1500–1566), French noblewoman
- Diane Poitras, Canadian film and video artist
- Diane Pozefsky, American computer scientist
- Diane Pratte (born 1953), Canadian alpine skier
- Diane Prince, several people
- Diane di Prima (1934–2020), American poet
- Diane Purkiss (born 1961), British-Australian historian
- Diane Rakiecki (born 1961), Canadian multi-sport para-athlete
- Diane Ramsay (born 1993), Scottish sprinter
- Diane Raptosh, American writer
- Diane Ratnik (born 1962), Canadian volleyball player
- Diane Ravitch (born 1938), American historian, educational policy analyst, and professor
- Diane Ray (1945–2020), American pop and rock and roll singer
- Diane Redmond, British writer and playwright
- Diane Rehm (born 1936), American journalist and public radio talk show host
- Diane Renay (born 1945), American singer
- Diane Richardson, American basketball coach
- Diane Roark (born 1949), American whistleblower
- Diane Roberts (born 1959), American author, columnist, essayist, radio commentator, reviewer and educator
- Diane Roberts (director), English theatre artist
- Diane Robertson (born 1953), New Zealand community leader
- Diane Rodríguez (born 1982), Ecuadorian activist and politician
- Diane Rodriguez (1951–2020), American actress
- Diane Rosenbaum (born 1949), American politician
- Diane Roter (born 1948), American actress
- Diane Rouxel (born 1993), French actress
- Diane Thiede Rover, American engineer
- Diane Rowe (1933–2023), British table tennis player
- Diane Roy (born 1971), Canadian wheelchair racer
- Diane Ruggiero (born 1970), American television writer and producer
- Diane Russell (born 1976), American politician
- Diane Russet (born 1996), Nigerian actress
- Diane Rwigara, Rwandan businesswoman and presidential candidate
- Diane Sabenacio Nititham, American cultural sociologist
- Diane Sabin (born 1952), American feminist
- Diane Salinger (born 1951), American actress
- Diane Samuels (born 1960), British author and playwright
- Diane Sands (born 1947), American politician
- Diane Saunders, British biologist and academic
- Diane Savereide (born 1954), American chess player
- Diane Savino (born 1963), American politician
- Diane Sawyer (born 1945), American television journalist
- Diane Schanzenbach, American economist
- Diane Grob Schmidt (born 1945), American chemist
- Diane Schnapp (born 1968), American rugby union player
- Diane Schoemperlen (born 1954), Canadian novelist and short story writer
- Diane Schuur (born 1953), American jazz singer and pianist
- Diane Setterfield (born 1964), English author
- Diane Seuss, American poet and educator
- Diane Seward, New Zealand thermochronologist
- Diane Shalet (1935–2006), American actress
- Diane Shaw (born 1962), British singer
- Diane Sherbloom (1942–1961), American ice dancer
- Diane Simmons (born 1948), American author
- Diane Simpson, several people
- Diane Sinclair (1921–2011), American actress
- Diane Smith, several people
- Diane B. Snelling (born 1952), American politician
- Diane Solomon, American singer
- Diane Sommerfield (1949–2001), American actress
- Diane Souvaine, computer scientist
- Diane St-Jacques (born 1953), Canadian businessperson and politician
- Diane St. Onge (born 1956), American politician
- Diane Stanley (born 1943), American children's book writer and illustrator
- Diane Messina Stanley (born 1946), American television writer and producer
- Diane Stevenett (born 1954), Canadian artist, singer, actress and producer
- Diane Stone (born 1964), Australian-British academic
- Diane Stratas (1932–2023), Canadian politician
- Diane Straus (1951–2017), American magazine publisher
- Diane Swanson (born 1944), Canadian children's writer
- Diane Swanton (born 1979), South African sport shooter
- Diane Swonk (born 1962), American economist
- Diane S. Sykes (born 1957), American judge
- Diane Teel (born 1948), American racing driver
- Diane Tell (born 1959), Canadian musician
- Diane Therrien, Canadian politician
- Diane Thomas (1946–1985), American screenwriter
- Diane Thome (1942–2025), American composer
- Diane Thorne, Canadian politician
- Diane Todd (1937–2010), British-born actress and singer
- Diane Torr (1948–2017), Canadian artist and drag king
- Diane Towler (born 1946), English ice dancer
- Diane Tuckman, American artist
- Diane Pierce Tudela, judoka
- Diane Tuft, American photographer
- Diane Urquhart, Canadian financial analyst
- Diane Valkenburg (born 1984), Dutch speed skater
- Diane Van Deren (born 1960), American ultra-runner
- Diane Varsi (1938–1992), American actress
- Diane Vaughan, American sociologist
- Diane Venora (born 1952), American stage, television and film actress
- Diane Vertin, American academic administrator
- Diane Victor (born 1964), South African artist and printmaker
- Diane Virjee (born 1960), Canadian field hockey player
- Diane Von Hoffman (1962–2017), American professional wrestler
- Diane Wakoski (born 1937), American poet
- Diane Wald (born 1948), American poet
- Diane Walker (born 1955), British swimmer
- Diane Wang, Chinese businesswoman
- Diane Ward (born 1956), American poet
- Diane Warren (born 1956), American songwriter
- Diane Watson (born 1933), American politician
- Diane Watson (archer) (born 1964), American archer
- Diane Watt, British medievalist
- Diane Webber (1932–2008), American actress
- Diane Wei Liang, Chinese-born writer
- Diane Weyermann (1955–2021), American film producer
- Diane Wheatley, American politician from North Carolina
- Diane Whitehouse, Canadian painter, professor and art activist
- Diane Wiessinger, American author and researcher
- Diane Wilkins, American film director
- Diane Williams, several people
- Diane Wilson (born 1948), American environmental activist, anti-war activist and author
- Diane Winston (born 1951), American professor of media and religion
- Diane Wittry, American conductor and composer
- Diane R. Wolf (1954–2008), American arts patron
- Diane Wood (born 1950), American judge and attorney
- Diane Yimga (born 1992), Congolese handball player
- Diane Youdale (born 1970), English television personality
- Diane Zamora (born 1978), American midshipman and murderer

Other

- Diahann Carroll (1935–2019), American actress and singer
- Dian Fossey (1932–1985), American primatologist and conservationist
- Dyan Cannon (born 1937), American actress

== Fictional characters ==
- Diane, an unseen and unheard character in the 1990 television show Twin Peaks
- Diane, a character from Pixar's Hoppers
- Diane, an unseen character from the 2008 video game No More Heroes
- Diane (The Seven Deadly Sins), a main character in the 2012 manga series The Seven Deadly Sins
- Diane Butcher, a character from the BBC soap opera EastEnders
- Diane Court, a character in the 1989 film Say Anything...
- Diane Chambers, a character in the TV series Cheers
- Diane Darcy, a race car driver in Herbie Goes to Monte Carlo
- Diane Hutchinson, a character from the British soap opera Hollyoaks
- Diane Jenkins Newman, a character on the American soap opera The Young and the Restless
- Diane Lockhart, a character of CBS television series The Good Wife
- Diane Miller, a character on the American soap opera General Hospital
- Diane Sugden, a character on the British soap opera Emmerdale
- Diane Nguyen, a character on the American adult animated series Bojack Horseman
- Diane Simmons, a character in the TV series Family Guy
- Diane Johnson, a main character in Black-ish
