= Bassham =

Bassham is an English toponymic surname. Notable people with the name include:

- Alan Bassham (1933–1982), English football right back
- Diane Bassham, plant pathologist
- James Bassham (1922–2012), American scientist
- Lanny Bassham (born 1947), American sports shooter
- Rabe Bassham (1900–1985), American baseball player
