= Daiane =

Daiane is a common Portuguese feminine given name (in English Diane).

== People ==
- Daiane Conterato (1990), Brazilian fashion model
- Daiane Limeira (1997), Brazilian footballer
- Daiane Rodrigues (footballer, born 1983), Brazilian footballer sometimes known by the demonym Bagé
- Daiane Rodrigues (footballer, born 1986), Brazilian footballer
- Daiane dos Santos (1983), Brazilian artistic gymnast

== See also ==
- Diane (given name)
