= Ray Basham =

Ray Basham may refer to:

- Raymond E. Basham (born 1945), member of the Michigan Senate
- Ray Basham (baseball) (1900–?), American baseball catcher in the Negro leagues
