= Diane Kelly =

Diane Kelly may refer to:

- Diane Kelly (novelist), author of humorous, romantic mystery novels
- Diane Kelly (microbiologist), professor of microbiology
- Diane Kelly (computer scientist), American computer scientist
