= Poitras =

Poitras is a surname. It may refer to:

- Anique Poitras (1961–2016), Canadian writer
- Audrey Poitras (born 1950), president of the Métis Nation of Alberta, Canada
- Diane Poitras (born 1951), Canadian video and film artist
- George Poitras (1937–2005), chief of the Peepeekisis Cree Nation, Canada
- Gilles Poitras, Canadian-born author of books relating to anime and manga
- Jacques Poitras (born 1967 or 1968), Canadian journalist and writer
- Jane Ash Poitras (born 1951), Canadian artist and printmaker
- Jane Cowell-Poitras (born 1953), Canadian politician
- Jean-Guy Poitras, Canadian badminton referee
- Laura Poitras (born 1964), American director and producer of documentary films
- Lawrence Poitras, Canadian judge
- Marie-Hélène Poitras (born 1975), Canadian writer
- Matthew Poitras (born 2004), Canadian professional ice-hockey player for the Boston Bruins
- Pierre Poitras (1810–1889), Canadian politician
- Serge Poitras (born 1949), Canadian Roman Catholic bishop
- Stacy Poitras American chainsaw carving sculptor
- Tina Poitras (born 1970), Canadian race walker
- Tom Poitras, American soccer coach
- Yvon Poitras (born 1948), Canadian businessman, politician and lobbyist
