= Dian (given name) =

Dian is a unisex given name. Notable people with the name include:

People:

- Dian Agus Prasetyo (born 1985), Indonesian footballer
- Dian Bachar (born 1970), American actor
- Dian Fossey (1932–1985), American zoologist who studied gorillas
- Dian Genchev (born 1975), Bulgarian footballer
- Dian HP (born 1965), Indonesian composer
- Dian Inggrawati (born 1984), deaf Indonesian beauty queen
- Dian Kateliev (born 1980), Bulgarian footballer
- Dian Million, Tanana Athabaskan professor
- Dian Moldovanov (born 1985), Bulgarian footballer
- Dian Nissen, American trampolinist, fitness professional, and daughter of the inventor of the trampoline
- Dian Sastrowardoyo (born 1982), Indonesian actress and model
- Dian Slavens (born 1958), American politician

Mythological or fictional characters:

- Dian Cecht, the god of healing in Irish mythology
- Dian Alberts, on the Dutch soap opera Goede tijden, slechte tijden
- Dian Belmont, a DC Comics character

== See also ==
- Diane (given name)
