= Diane Tuft =

American photographer

- Born: 1947 (age 78–79); East Hartford, CT, United States
- Education: University of Connecticut; Pratt Institute
- Occupation: Photographer
- Years active: 1998–present
- Spouse: Tom Tuft (m. 1971)
- Children: 3
- Website: dianetuft.com

Diane Tuft (born 1947) is an American photographer focusing on nature and landscape photography, documenting the effects of the environment on the Earth's landscape. She is based in New York City.

== Early life and education ==
Tuft was born and raised in East Hartford, Connecticut. She graduated from the University of Connecticut with a degree in mathematics. After graduating, she moved to New York City to work as an actuarial assistant. She later held jobs with the Burroughs Corporation and Computer Design Corporation. During this time, she studied photography at The New School and the International Center of Photography. Tuft married in 1971 and while raising a family studied art at Pratt Institute in Brooklyn from 1981 to 1989.

== Career ==
=== Unseen and other work (1998–2011) ===
Tuft began her work in 1998 with images of snow and ice in Aspen, Colorado. There she first experimented with infrared film, where the photos could capture the infrared light waves that were reflected and refracted on the landscape, which are beyond the human visible spectrum. These photographs would become platinum prints, and resulted in her first solo exhibition, Distillations, at Hollis Taggart Galleries in New York City in 1999. She continued to photograph outside the visible spectrum, focusing on the visual effects of ultraviolet light waves on the Earth's landscape. Tuft began traveling to ozone-depleted areas where larger amounts of ultraviolet light reach the Earth. This led to an interest in climate change and other environmental issues. She began photographing the Arctic landscape in 2001, and has said that an aim of her work is to demonstrate the realities of global warming and its effect on the Earth. She often documents icy landscapes through aerial photography in order to capture "the sculptural qualities of frozen water." She typically zooms in to the landscape to the point of abstraction, framing shots without a sense of scale. In 2008, Tuft published her first monograph, Unseen: Beyond the Visible Spectrum, a retrospective of her photographs between the years 1998 and 2007, featuring the American West, Nepal, North Africa, Iceland and Greenland. The foreword was written by William Fox, director of the Center for Art and Environment at the Nevada Museum of Art.

In 2006, Tuft created a room-size installation, Internal Reflection, which combined sculpture, light, sound and photography. It was exhibited at the Katonah Museum of Art in New York City and at Art LA in Santa Monica, California. Her 2008 series Salt Lake Reconsidered, exhibited at Ameringer & Yohe Fine Art in New York City and the Kimball Art Center in Park City, Utah, featured aerial photographs of the Great Salt Lake. Tuft's photographic series Icelandic Glaciers in 2001 and Icelandic Sagas in 2008 document the change of Iceland's glaciers due to climate change. In 2010, Tuft revisited Iceland, creating her series Aftermath, a collection of aerial photographs of the center of Iceland and Eyjafjallajökull's eruption.

=== Gondwana (2012–14) ===
Tuft received a 2012 National Science Foundation grant to explore the visual effects of ozone depletion on Antarctica's landscape. In October 2012, she traveled to Antarctica, living at McMurdo Station for six weeks. The resulting images collected in her 2014 book Gondwana: Images of an Ancient Land focused on the effects that the harsh environment of Antarctica had on shaping its landscape. These images include the meromictic lakes in the dry valleys of Antarctica, where millions of years of gasses have been trapped in the ice, volcanic gas formations, glacial striations that record millions of years of snow accumulation, and ventifacts formed by ongoing intense winds. The book's foreword was written by Elisabeth Sussman, curator of photography at the Whitney Museum of American Art.

=== The Arctic Melt (2015–present) ===
During the summers of 2015 and 2016, Tuft explored the Arctic to document the severe melt that was occurring throughout the region. Her journey included the mountain glaciers and surrounding waters of Svalbard, Norway, the sea ice in the Arctic Ocean including the North Pole, and the icebergs and ice sheet of Greenland. Tuft's series, The Arctic Melt: Images of a Disappearing Landscape, has resulted in several exhibitions worldwide, as well as a three-minute film and book. Climate scientist Joe Romm wrote the book's introduction. The film was presented on Earth Day at the March for Science at the National Mall in Washington, D.C., and The Arctic Melt exhibition at Marlborough Gallery was nominated for a Global Fine Art Award in the Global Planet category in October 2017.

=== Collections ===
Tuft has work included in the permanent collections of the Whitney Museum of American Art in Manhattan, International Center of Photography in Manhattan, and the Parrish Art Museum in Water Mill, New York.

== Personal life ==
Tuft lives with her husband Tom Tuft in New York City. They have three children.

== Solo exhibitions ==
- Distillations, Hollis Taggart Galleries, New York, NY, 1999
- Truth is in the Eye of the Beholder, Museum of Arts and Science, Daytona, FL, 2004
- Internal Reflection, Art L.A., Santa Monica, CA, 2005; Katonah Museum of Art, New York, NY, 2006
- Salt Lake Reconsidered, Ameringer & Yohe Fine Art, New York, NY, 2008; Kimball Art Center, Park City, UT, 2009; Quogue Gallery, Quogue, NY, 2016
- Unseen Arctic, 2008–2009, Pulse, New York, NY, 2010
- Aftermath, Marlborough Gallery, New York, NY, 2012
- The Arctic: Photographs from Greenland and Iceland 2001-2008, Southampton Center, Southampton, NY, 2013
- Gondwana: Images of an Ancient Land, Marlborough Gallery, New York, NY, 2014
- Antarctic Photography: Selections from Gondwana, Images of an Ancient Land, Bruce Museum of Arts and Science, Greenwich, CT, 2014-15
- East to West, Southampton Art Center, Southampton, NY, 2015
- The Arctic Melt, Marlborough Gallery, New York, NY, 2017; Harpa, Reykjavík, Iceland, 2017; National Academy of Sciences, Washington, DC, 2017-18

== Bibliography ==
- Unseen: Beyond the Visible Spectrum (2009, Ameringer Yohe Fine Art, ISBN 978-0982081013) – foreword by William Fox
- Gondwana: Images of an Ancient Land (2014, Assouline Publishing, ISBN 978-1614281993) – foreword by Elisabeth Sussman
- The Arctic Melt: Images of a Disappearing Landscape (2017, Assouline Publishing, ISBN 978-1614285861) – foreword by Joe Romm
