= Diane Hansen =

Diane Hansen may refer to:

- Diane Hansen (skier), see Freestyle skiing at the 2007 Canada Games
- Diane Hansen in Visions of Cody
- Diane Hansen (pageant contestant), Miss Michigan
- Diane Hansen, character in List of Person of Interest episodes
- Diane Hansen, wife of American writer Neal Cassady
