= Diane Sabenacio Nititham =

American cultural sociologist

Diane Sabenacio Nititham is an American cultural sociologist and co-founder of the diversity, equity, and inclusion (DEI) education company reframe52.

== Education ==
Diane Sabenacio Nithitam completed her BA in communication at DePaul University in Chicago, Illinois in 2002. During her time at DePaul, she worked with a community organization in Thailand. After that, she completed her master's degree in social and cultural foundations in education, also at DePaul University in 2006. Then in 2010, she completed her PhD in sociology at the University College Dublin (UCD) in Dublin, Ireland.

== Academic positions ==
During her PhD program, Nititham began teaching as an adjunct faculty member in the Department of Sociology and Women's Studies at UCD. After returning to the US, she began teaching as a visiting lecturer in the Department of Sociology at the University of Illinois at Chicago (UIC) in Chicago, Illinois. At UIC, she won the Recognition for Exemplary Undergraduate Teaching in 2012. She also worked as an adjunct faculty member in Chicago at DePaul University (in the Department of Educational Policy Studies and Research and Department of Communication) before joining the faculty at National Louis University. At National Louis, she was an assistant professor for social and behavioral sciences, where she served as co-chair of the Graduate Program in Public Policy and Administration and also chair of the BA Program in Social Science. In 2015, she moved to a position at Murray State University (MSU) in Murray, Kentucky. Since 2019, Nititham has served as the Sociology Program Coordinator for Murray State University. In 2021, she won the MSU Board of Regents Teaching Award. At Murray State, she teaches a range of topics including popular culture, social inequality, migration, and education. She also offers courses in Dublin for Murray State's Education Abroad programs. She is part of the Diversity Scholars Network at the National Center for Institutional Diversity (NCID) at the University of Michigan.

== Research ==
Nititham's research focuses on the dynamics of diaspora, transnational social practices, and notions of home and belonging. She is interested in how these dynamics manifest for people amongst asymmetrical power relations, social policies, and community coalition building. She uses qualitative research methodologies, including interviews, group discussions, and visual evidence, in her research. The main focus of her research is the Filipino diaspora in Ireland.

In 2016, Nititham published Making Home in Diasporic Communities: Transnational Belonging Amongst Filipina Migrants. "The book focuses on the social practices and symbolic enactments of “home” for Filipina migrants and how their experiences are shaped by the dynamics of language, religion, and food as practices of home-making. The book looks at the factors that position Filipinas within Irish society and those which affect their relationship to Filipino communities in the Philippines, Ireland, and the United States. She argues that the experience of Filipinas raises larger questions of inclusion and exclusion for diasporic communities as they “make home”."

== Media and creative work ==
As part of her research practice, Nititham uses photography to document spaces that serve as data points for the lived experience of the communities she studies as well as use archival photographs as primary research. One of her first exhibitions was the 2011 exhibition titled Ornamental. Oriental., which "Presented photographic artwork in a joint exhibition with Holly Pereira at independent gallery The Joinery. Utilized self-portraits to explore notions of Asian-ness in contemporary Ireland." The exhibition made the "hot list" at the time, in The Irish Times newspaper. In 2021, she exhibited some of these photographs in a show called "Emergent SocialScapes" at the Murray Art Guild in Murray, Kentucky. A digital version of this exhibition was also produced. These photographs were taken during her research for her book 2016 Making Home in Diasporic Communities: Transnational Belonging Amongst Filipina Migrants.

== DEI work ==
In 2019, Nititham was part of a team (including Maeve McCarthy, Claire Fuller, Robin Zhang, Michael Bordieri, and Paula Waddill) at MSU that received an National Science Foundation ADVANCE Grant to "improve equity for STEM faculty at MSU, which is a regional comprehensive and primarily undergraduate public university in rural western Kentucky." She is currently working with a team on another ADVANCE to "research intersectionality on Murray State’s campus" with Michael Bordieri (associate professor of psychology) and Alexandra Hendley (associate professor of sociology). Nititham continues her DEI work in the private sector with the company reframe52 that she co-founded with Karen Chan and Danielle Mužina.

== Publications ==
=== Books ===
- 2014 - Nititham, D.S. and Boyd, R. eds. Heritage, Diaspora and the Consumption of Culture: Movements in Irish Landscapes. Farnham: Ashgate.
- 2016 - Making Home in Diasporic Communities: Transnational Belonging Amongst Filipina Migrants. London: Routledge.

=== Articles, chapters, and other publications ===
- 2008 - Review of Diaspora: An Introduction by Jana Evans Braziel. Translocations: The Irish Migration, Race and Social Transformation Review, 4 (1), pp. 136–8.
- 2008 - “Locating the self in diaspora space,” Translocations: The Irish Migration, Race and Social Transformation Review, 3(1), pp. 1–17.
- 2011. “Filipinos in Ireland: Articulating and Enacting Community” in Fanning, B. & Munck, R. eds, Immigration & the Irish Experience of European & Global Transformation. Farnham: Ashgate.
- 2011 - “Migration as Cultural Capital: The Ongoing Dependence on Overseas Filipino Workers”, Malaysian Journal of Economic Studies, 48(2).
- 2014 - O'Sullivan, S., McMahon, L., Moore, G., Nititham, D.S. Slevin, A., Kelly, C. and Wixted, L. “‘I Did Not Miss Any, Only When I Had a Valid Reason’: Accounting for Absences from Sociology Classes.” Teaching Sociology OnlineFirst, pp. 1-11.
- 2014 - ‘‘It’s Still Home Home’: Notions of the Homeland for Filipina Dependent Students in Ireland’ in Baas, M. (ed), Transnational Migration and Asia: The Question of Return. Amsterdam: Amsterdam University Press.
- 2014 - “‘We Cannot Gather without Eating’: Food, Authenticity and Socialisation for Filipinos in Ireland” Nititham, D.S. and Boyd, R. eds. Heritage, Diaspora and the Consumption of Culture: Movements in Irish Landscapes. Farnham: Ashgate.
- 2020 - “Navigating Precarities: Agency, Intergenerational Care, and Counter-Narratives among Indigenous Migrant Youth.” Jeunesse: Young People, Texts, Cultures, 12(2): 183–7.
- 2022 - Nielsen, D., Nititham, D.S., Polizzi, M. “Interdisciplinary Team Teaching: Reflections on Praxis and Pedagogy in an Undergraduate Classroom,” College Teaching.
- 2022 - “Positionalities of Precarity: An Autoethnography on ‘Making It’ in the Neoliberal Academy. Journal of Autoethnography.
- 2022 - Nielsen, D., Nititham, D.S., "Celebrity memes, audioshop, and participatory fan culture: a case study on Keanu Reeves memes" in Celebrity Studies, 2022, no. 2, p. 159-170
