= Diane Wald =

American poet

Diane Wald is an American poet and novelist. Her most recent poetry collection is The Warhol Pillows (2021). She has published poems in literary journals and magazines including The American Poetry Review, Fence, The Hat, Verse, and The Paterson Review. She was born in Paterson, New Jersey. She earned a B.A. from Montclair State College and an M.F.A. from the University of Massachusetts Amherst, and has lived in Massachusetts since 1972. She lives near Boston. A sequel to The Bayrose Files, titled A Door in the Floor, from Regal House Publishing, is forthcoming.

== Awards and honors ==
- 2020 International Book Awards Winner in Fiction: Novella
- 2020 Independent Press Award Winner in Paranormal Romance
- 2019 Readers' Favorite Awards Bronze Medal Winner in Fiction (Visionary)
- Winner for Gillyflower in Novella category, Next Generation Indie Book Awards
- Winner for Gillyflower in fiction (Novella), Best Book Awards
- 2021 NYC Big Book Awards Winner in Visionary Fiction for My Famous Brain
- 2021 Winner in Visionary Fiction, new Adult Fiction, and Speculative Fiction from Firebirds Book Awards for My Famous Brain
- Anne Halley Poetry Prize
- Fine Arts Work Center fellowship
- Denny Award
- Open Voice Award
- Massachusetts Artist Grant
- Green Lake Chapbook Award from Owl Creek Press

== Published works ==
=== Full-length poetry collections ===
- Lucid Suitcase (Red Hen Press, 1999)
- 'The Yellow Hotel'. Verse Press. 2002. ISBN 0-9723487-2-7.
- Wonderbender, 2011, 1913 Press
- The Warhol Pillows, 2021, Finishing Line Press

=== Chapbooks ===
- My Hat That Was Dreaming (White Fields Press)
- Double Mirror (Runaway Spoon Press, 1996)
- Improvisations on Titles of Works by Jean Dubuffet (Mudlark, 1998)
- Faustinetta, Gegenschein, Trapunto (Cervena Barva Press, 2008)

=== Novellas ===
- Gillyflower (2019, She Writes Press) https://www.gillyflowernovel.com
- The Bayrose Files, Regal House Publishing,

=== Novels ===
- 2021: My Famous Brain (She Writes Press) https://www.myfamousbrain.com
