= Diane Seward =

New Zealand thermochronologist

- Education: Aberystwyth University; McMaster University
- Alma mater: Victoria University of Wellington
- Scientific career
- Thesis: Some Aspects of Sedimentology of the Wanganui Basin, North Island, New Zealand (1974)

Diane Seward is a low temperature thermochronologist. She is currently a Teaching Fellow at Victoria University of Wellington and affiliated with GNS Science. Seward's work has predominantly focused on thermochronology applied to basin analysis and tectonic evolution. Her research has also been instrumental in developing dating of volcanic deposit through fission track analysis.

== Early life and education ==
Seward is originally from the United Kingdom. She completed her undergraduate degree in geology (BSc Hons) in 1963 at University College Aberystwyth in Wales. Seward then completed an MSc in geology (1965) at McMaster University in Canada, and, in 1974, in New Zealand, earned a PhD from the Victoria University of Wellington titled Some Aspects of Sedimentology of the Wanganui Basin, North Island, New Zealand. She was one of the first researchers to study the sedimentology of the Wanganui basin including early tephrochronology and developing some of the earliest fission track dating in New Zealand, and this work continues.

== Career and impact ==
As a postdoctoral researcher Seward was employed by the New Zealand Institute of Nuclear Sciences, Department of Scientific and Industrial Research (DSIR), where she expanded her work on fission track dating to cover uplift of older rocks.

Seward's international contribution as a researcher includes roles as a visiting scientist in the Max Planck Institut für Kernforschung, Heidelberg from 1976 to 1978; Senior Scientist at the Institute of Nuclear Sciences, DSIR, New Zealand 1979–1990 (with further work on fission track dating) Senior Scientist at ETH, Zurich between 1990 and 2008; Visiting Scientist in the Indian Institute of Technology, Mumbai 1999; Invited Visiting Professor to Tongji University, Shanghai 2008; Blaustein Visiting Professor to Stanford University, California 2009 before returning to New Zealand in 2010 as Professor at Victoria University of Wellington's School of Geography Environment and Earth Science.

Seward is the author of a number of book chapters specifically focusing on fission track analysis including a recent chapter "Tracks in time" 2008. In:- A continent on the move Ed.: Graham, I. New Zealand Government publication.

Seward has a publication record of over 5000 citations with highly cited publications on the Mesozoic and Cenozoic tectonics of the Tibetan plateau, the Neogene kinematics of the central and Western Alps, and fission-track dating of glass shards in New Zealand.
