= Diane Patrick =

Diane Patrick may refer to:

- Diane Patrick (lawyer), First Lady of Massachusetts
- Diane Patrick (Texas politician) (born 1946), member of the Texas House of Representatives
