= Diane A. Jenkins =

American lawyer

Diane Aker Jenkins (born December 1946) is the American co-founder and executive director of Friends of the Americas. In 1985, she received the first annual Ronald Reagan American Ideals Award from U.S. President Ronald Reagan. Jenkins is a former assistant attorney general of Louisiana and an assistant district attorney for East Baton Rouge Parish. In 1986, she was named one of the "Ten Most Valuable People in America" by USA Today.

Jenkins received a Juris Doctor degree from Louisiana State University Law Center in Baton Rouge. She won the LSU Moot Court competition and is an inductee of LSU Law Center Hall of Fame. She is married to Louis E. "Woody" Jenkins, a newspaper publisher in Central in East Baton Rouge Parish and a former member of the Louisiana House of Representatives.
