= Diane Bayegla Ndeme =

Cameroonian footballer

Diane Bayegla Ndeme (born 9 June 1990) is a Cameroonian football player. She played at the 2018 Africa Women Cup of Nations, winning a bronze medal.

She played for Caïman Douala.
