= Diane Montagna =

American journalist and author

- Education: BA in Italian, License in Sacred Theology
- Alma mater: International Theological Institute, Gaming Austria
- Occupations: Journalist, Author, Translator
- Writing career
- Notable works: Christus Vincit: Christ's Triumph Over the Darkness of the Age, Calming the Storm: Navigating the Crises Facing the Catholic Church and Society

Diane Montagnais an American journalist and author known for her in-depth coverage of the Catholic Church, its doctrines, and its politics. She started her career in journalism by translating papal addresses for Zenit News Agency during the pontificate of Pope Benedict XVI. Later, she served as a translator for the English edition of the Vatican newspaper, L’Osservatore Romano.

Her work has also appeared in Catholic publications such as the National Catholic Register and Humanitas Christian Anthropological Review. Prior to her current role as the Rome correspondent for the Catholic Herald, she served in the same capacity for LifeSiteNews and for the English edition of Aleteia for several years. In addition to her journalism career, she has also taught children’s and adult faith formation classes.

Montagna holds a License in Sacred Theology from the International Theological Institute, Gaming, Austria and a B.A. in Italian.

== Bibliography ==
Montagna has co-authored two books, Christus Vincit: Christ's Triumph Over the Darkness of the Age with Athanasius Schneider (Angelico Press, 2019, OCLC 1396124183) and Calming the Storm: Navigating the Crises Facing the Catholic Church and Society with Fr. Gerald E. Murray (Emmaus Road Publishing, 2022. OCLC 1318992077).

== Career ==
In recent years, Montagna has written on a range of church-related topics. She has reported on issues such as synodal reform, declining birth rates in Italy, the endorsement of homosexual unions by German bishops, and restrictions on the Traditional Latin Mass. She has also written about the legacy of Pope Benedict XVI, discussing his impact on priestly vocations and his deep affection for England and its saints.
