= Diane Kerr =

Australian indigenous rights activist

Aunty Diane Kerr (born 1954) is an Indigenous Australian Wurundjeri Elder who identifies with the Ganun Willam Balak clan. She has contributed to Australian society through her work with the Aboriginal and Torres Strait Islander community and government in a range of fields including health, child care, education, native title, Stolen Generation support, and other community work.

Kerr's public contributions were nationally acknowledged by the awarding of the Medal of the Order of Australia (OAM) in the 2019 Australia Day Honours List. She was also acknowledged by the Victorian State Government when she was inducted into the 2017 Victorian Aboriginal Honour Roll.

Kerr conducts Welcome to Country at events in Melbourne (Australia).

She has been appointed to the council and boards of a number of organisations. She is the Chair of the Board of Native Title Services Victoria. In 2016, Kerr was appointed to the Aboriginal Treaty Interim Working Group by the Minister of Aboriginal Affairs, Government of Victoria. Kerr sits on the Community Council of the South Eastern Melbourne Primary Health Network (SEMPHN). Kerr is member of the First 1000 Days Australia council. She is a member and former Director of the Dandenong and District Aboriginal Co-Operative.
