= Diane Gayer =

American architect (born 1952)

Diane Elliott Gayer
- Born: November 27, 1952 (age 73)
- Education: University of Colorado
- Occupations: Architect, Ecological designer, Community planner,

Diane Elliott Gayer (born 27 November 1952) was raised in Geneva, Switzerland. She is an American architect who practiced in the US as well as abroad. She has worked and taught in the fields of architecture, community planning, and environmental design.

== Education ==
In 1975, Gayer obtained an undergraduate degree in German Studies from the University of Colorado, Boulder. Later, from 1976 to 1979, she joined the Master's in Architecture Program at the University of Colorado (MArch - a terminal degree), Denver. Throughout her enrollment in this three-year program, Gayer engaged with the architectural concepts, technologies, graphic presentations, and participated in studio experiences alongside her fellow students. For her thesis, Gayer developed a mixed-use hospital expansion for the National Jewish Hospital-University of Colorado Medical Center.

Gayer's educational journey expanded as she delved into architectural exploration during the same period. Her endeavors included focusing on environmental consciousness, passive solar design, historical preservation, and community involvement. These academic pursuits and practical experiences established the foundational framework for her subsequent achievements in the realm of architecture.

== Career ==
After she graduated from the MArch program, Gayer got a job at Marvin E. Knedler & Associates, which then led to positions at Duff, Reck, Lehman Architects, and Michael Gaviglio & Associates. Upon getting her license in 1983 she and her partner started their own firm Artemis Designs. She has led a team to design many projects, such as The Left Bank Townhouses. In 1988; Gayer moved to Vermont to work as a university architect and later to teach as adjunct at the University of Vermont

Gayer was the director of the Vermont Design Institute (VDI), a non-profit organization focused on design and community development, headquartered in Burlington, Vermont, where she has managed the state-wide collaborative since April 1998.

Between June 1999 and September 2000, she worked as a planner for the state of Vermont. During this time, she was responsible for organizing the Smart Growth conference for the state, also authoring a work on the History of Planning in Vermont.

Diane Gayer participated in a diverse range of projects to show her passion and versatility in the architectural field, one of which is the Masozera House in Rwanda. Additionally, she actively engages in pro bono endeavors in South Africa, lending her expertise to various local initiatives. Beyond this, Gayer commits herself to numerous NGO projects, advocating for architecture as an effective instrument for creating social and communal development.

== The Masozera Family House ==
The Masozera Family House in Rwanda is a prominent testament to her creative prowess of Diane Gayer. Nestled above Lake Kivu and aligned with a fault line connecting Lake Victoria to the Nile Basin, the property's strategic location served as a canvas for Gayer's ingenuity. Drawing inspiration from Rwandan architect Vedaste Ngarambe, who championed the aesthetics of indigenous materials and craftsmanship, Gayer harnessed the geographical alignment and incorporated local elements and techniques into the project. The architectural concept of the house was underpinned by a commitment to sustainable design, aiming to contribute to the country's recovery and address the effects of the 1994 genocide.

Constructed from 2010 to 2017, The Masozera Family House integrates with the hillside terrain, comprising three distinct levels: an inviting entry foyer, expansive public living spaces, and private bedrooms. Gayer conscientiously adhered to local regulations on tree protection, sourcing the primary construction materials from the immediate area. The house was equipped with critical environmental features, including solar panels, water harvesting systems, natural ventilation, and an in-ground septic system. These elements collectively exemplify a harmonious fusion of architectural brilliance, sustainability, and a deep-rooted connection to the local context.
