= Diane Kelly (microbiologist) =

British Microbiologist

- Known for: Research on sterol metabolism and microbial cytochromes P450
- Title: Professor Emeritus of Microbiology
- Awards: Fellow of the Royal Society of Biology; Fellow of the Learned Society of Wales (2017)

Academic background
- Education: Swansea University (PhD)

Academic work
- Discipline: Microbiology

Diane Kelly is Professor Emeritus of Microbiology, Institute of Life Science, Swansea University Medical School, Fellow of the Royal Society of Biology and Fellow of the Learned Society of Wales.

== Career ==
After undergraduate study in London, she undertook a PhD at Swansea University followed by postdoctoral work at the University of Sheffield, researching microbial cytochromes P450. After a position at Aberystwyth University she returned to Swansea University Medical School as Reader and then Professor. She continues to research sterol metabolism and microbial cytochromes P450 as targets for antifungal agents in medicine and agriculture, and has authored over fifty papers on these subjects. She is a member of the BBSRC pool of experts and Natural Products (NPRONET, NIBB) board member. In 2017 she was elected a Fellow of the Learned Society of Wales. She has also chaired Swansea University's Athena SWAN committee, the medical school's Athena SWAN and Equality and Diversity committees, and is a regular member/chair of UK Athena SWAN assessment panels.
