= Diane Williams =

Diane Williams may refer to:

- Diane Williams (author) (born 1946), American author,
- Diane Williams (sprinter) (born 1960), American sprinter
- Williams v. Saxbe (1947–2016), African-American lawyer known for Williams v. Saxbe
- Diane Wray Williams (born 1938), American politician, businesswoman, and teacher
