= Diane Havlir =

US leader of HIV/AIDS work

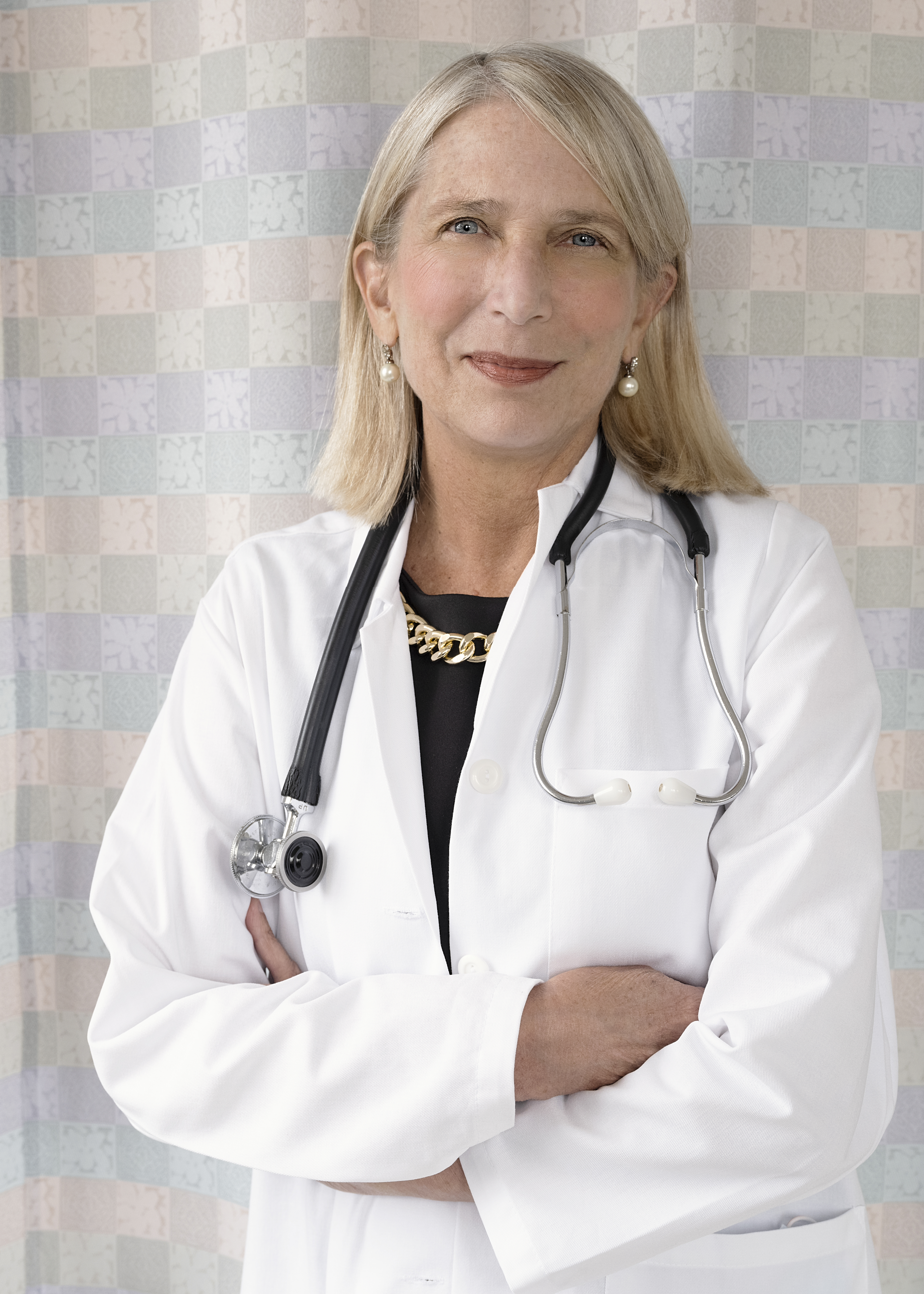
- Diane Havlir in 2021
- Education: Duke University School of Medicine; University of California, San Francisco; St. Olaf College
- Scientific career
- Workplaces: University of California, San Francisco; San Francisco General Hospital

Diane Havlir is an American physician who is a professor of Medicine and Chief of the HIV/AIDS Division at the University of California, San Francisco. Her research considers novel therapeutic strategies to improve the lives of people with HIV and to support public health initiatives in East Africa. She was elected to the National Academy of Medicine in 2019.

== Early life and education ==
Havlir was born in Illinois. As a teenager, Havlir was a speed skater and by 1974 was the United States national short track champion. Havlir studied biology and chemistry at St. Olaf College and graduated in 1980. While there, instead of speed skating, she took part in cross-country running. She briefly considered becoming an environmental lawyer before taking part in an interim course in medicine. During her undergraduate degree, Havlir took part in a study abroad course in Costa Rica on the nutrition habits of the elderly. She moved to the Duke University School of Medicine for her Doctorate of Medicine, which she completed in 1984. Havlir became interested in infectious diseases.

== Academic career ==
Havlir worked as an internal medicine resident at the UCSF Medical Center when AIDS emerged in the 1980s. She worked in the first AIDS ward at San Francisco General Hospital. She completed a fellowship in infectious diseases at Case Western Reserve University. At the time, people didn't know the causes of AIDS, or how to treat it. She demonstrated that the antibiotic azithromycin was an effective way to prevent mycobacterium avium-intracellulare infections. She went on to show that a cocktail of drugs was the most effective way to suppress the virus. Whilst the HIV cocktail was effective, it was complicated and expensive – requiring patients to take nine drugs a day at a cost of $30,000 a year. In the early 1990s, Havlir spearheaded early studies using antiretroviral therapy, which led to its widespread usage. To try to simplify the treatment, Havlir unsuccessfully tried to reduce the number of drugs used in the cocktail after the virus started to decrease.

== Research ==
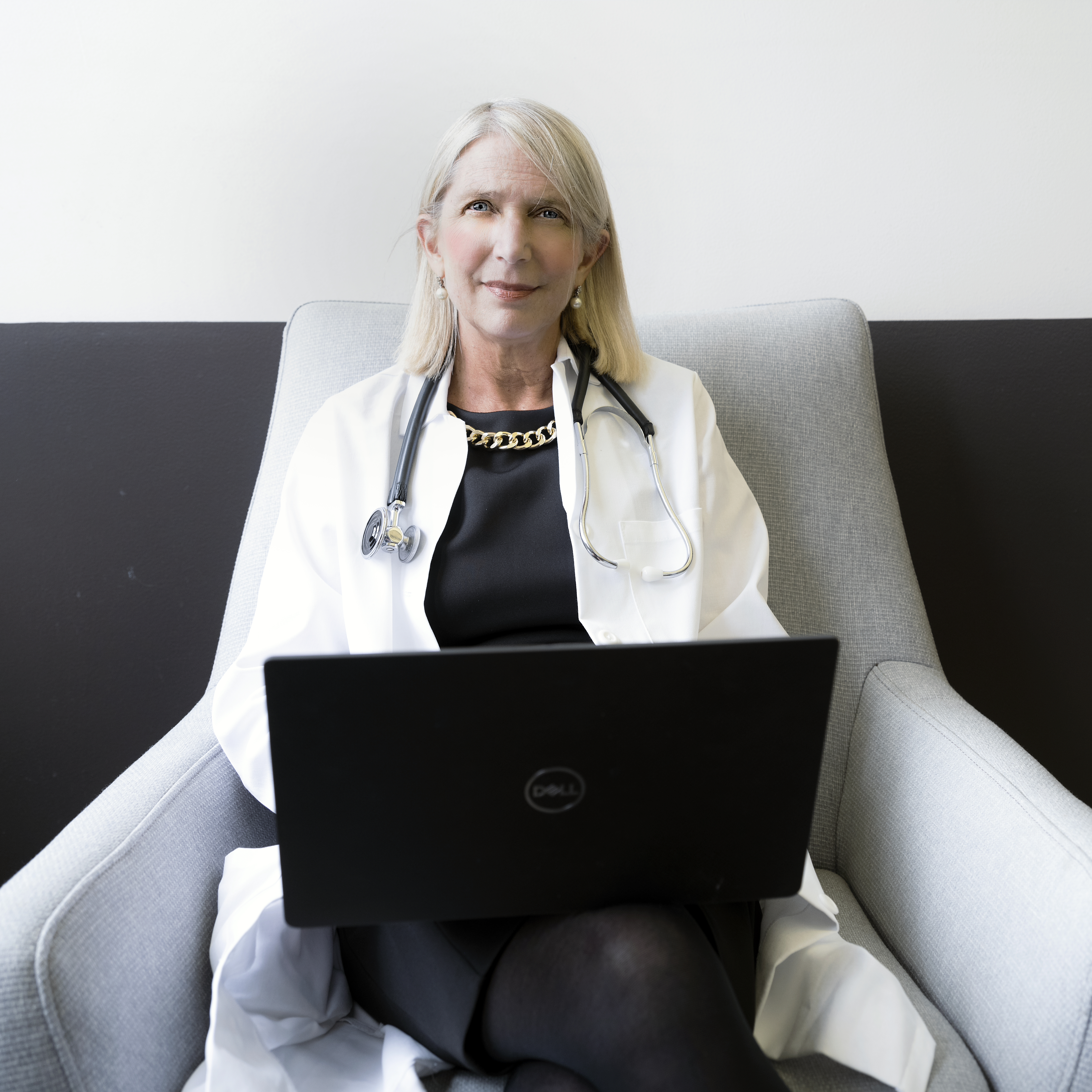
Havlir in 2021 at Zuckerberg San Francisco General Hospital's Ward 86

Havlir has studied new treatments for HIV/AIDS, including Highly Active Anti-Retroviral Therapy (HAART) which can overcome the ability of HIV to mutate and become resistant. Her research has contributed to turning HIV from a fatal disease to a manageable chronic illness. Working with the World Health Organization, Havlir committed to treating three million HIV/AIDS sufferers by 2005. In 2006, Havlir was appointed Chair of the World Health Organization TB/HIV Working Group, and by 2007 she had achieved the goal of treating three million people.

In 2012, Havlir wrote a nine-point plan, the D.C. Declaration, which outlined what was needed to end the HIV/AIDS epidemic. She acted as co-chair of the 2012 International AIDS Conference. She co-founded the San Francisco Getting to Zero coalition, which looks to reduce the number of HIV infections and deaths in San Francisco by 90% by 2020. The coalition formed after a patient enquiry and has established testing sites all over the city, expanded access to Pre-exposure prophylaxis (PrEP), initiated treatment as soon as diagnosis is made and ensured continued care.

Havlir has exported the success of the San Francisco AIDS treatment programs to Sub-Saharan Africa. In this capacity, she established the UCSF Medical Center Sustainable East Africa Research in Community Health (SEARCH) project in 2014, which by 2016 had identified and treated 90% of HIV infections. Havlir has led collaborations between the Makerere University and the AIDS Clinical Trials Group. She is leading a National Institutes of Health study involving 320,000 people in Uganda and Kenya that plans to eliminate HIV through community health based approaches. The program was supported by the National Institutes of Health, the President's Emergency Plan for AIDS Relief and the World Bank. The collaboration has negotiated with pharmaceutical companies to reduce the cost of treatment for patients. She has found that it is beneficial to test for multiple diseases in African clinics, as it reduces stigma and shares the costs.

Havlir is the Chief of the HIV/AIDS Division at UCSF School of Medicine.

== Awards and honors ==
- 2004 Infectious Diseases Society of America and HIV Medicine Association HIV Research Achievement Award
- 2012 Infectious Diseases Society of America Joseph E. Smadel Lecture
- 2012 Vanity Fair Hall of Fame
- 2013 St. Olaf College Hall of Fame
- 2017 Duke University School of Medicine Alumni Award
- 2019 Elected a member of the National Academy of Medicine

== Selected publications ==
- Cohen, Myron S.; Chen, Ying Q.; McCauley, Marybeth; Gamble, Theresa; Hosseinipour, Mina C.; Kumarasamy, Nagalingeswaran; Hakim, James G.; Kumwenda, Johnstone; Grinsztejn, Beatriz; Pilotto, Jose H.S.; Godbole, Sheela V.; Mehendale, Sanjay; Chariyalertsak, Suwat; Santos, Breno R.; Mayer, Kenneth H.; Hoffman, Irving F.; Eshleman, Susan H.; Piwowar-Manning, Estelle; Wang, Lei; Makhema, Joseph; Mills, Lisa A.; De Bruyn, Guy; Sanne, Ian; Eron, Joseph; Gallant, Joel; Havlir, Diane; Swindells, Susan; Ribaudo, Heather; Elharrar, Vanessa; et al. (2011). "Prevention of HIV-1 infection with early antiretroviral therapy". The New England Journal of Medicine. 365 (6): 493–505. doi:10.1056/Nejmoa1105243. PMC 3200068. PMID 21767103.
- Wong, J. K. (1997). "Recovery of Replication-Competent HIV Despite Prolonged Suppression of Plasma Viremia". Science. 278 (5341): 1291–1295. doi:10.1126/science.278.5341.1291. PMID 9360926.
- Gulick, Roy M.; Mellors, John W.; Havlir, Diane; Eron, Joseph J.; Gonzalez, Charles; McMahon, Deborah; Richman, Douglas D.; Valentine, Fred T.; Jonas, Leslie; Meibohm, Anne; Emini, Emilio A.; Chodakewitz, Jeffrey A.; Deutsch, Paul; Holder, Daniel; Schleif, William A.; Condra, Jon H. (September 11, 1997). "Treatment with Indinavir, Zidovudine, and Lamivudine in Adults with Human Immunodeficiency Virus Infection and Prior Antiretroviral Therapy". The New England Journal of Medicine. 337 (11): 734–739. doi:10.1056/NEJM199709113371102. PMID 9287228.

== Personal life ==
Havlir is married to physician Arturo Martinez, whom she met at the University of California, San Francisco, where she did her residency. They have four children.
