= Diane Ibbotson =

English artist

Diane Ibbotson (born 1946) is an English artist born in Lancashire, England. She attended the University of Reading from 1964 to 1968, and taught at Blackpool College of Art, and then the Falmouth School of Arts between 1974 and 1981.

== Artistic life ==
Ibbotson was awarded the annual Newcomer prize from the Royal Academy in 2007. Her method of creating art has been described as "a rule-governed process of painting, based on close observation and meticulous recording. She works slowly, finishing one work before starting another." The catalogue 20 Years of Contemporary Art at the Falmouth Art Gallery, indicated that she had made 35 works, but to this day, rarely exhibits them. Through a short video interview from a studio visit, Ibbotson traces the beginning of her career to when she was eight years old. When she showed a drawing she had done of her cat, everyone she showed it to enjoyed it.

== Works ==
Ibbotson's choice of subject matter and technique are filled with autobiographical meaning, showing her experience of a moment in time, including elaborate detail.

Ibbotson states that the work titled Here I Am took 5 years to complete. She drew the wallpaper flowers in pencil first, in little bunches. The work shows the reflection of Ibbotson in a bathroom mirror. Ibbotson says that she pencil outlined all of the major points in the painting and then "I put the descriptive bits in as I went along, my reflection, the objects, the pattern on the wallpaper."

Regarding the work titled Self Portrait in Best Dress, the cataloger of the online collection containing the work states that Ibbotson created this work in 1970 while exploring the theme of self-portraits between 1970 and 1975. She returned to this theme from 1975–1977, painting a series of self-portraits.
