= Diane Thiede Rover =

American engineer

Diane Thiede Rover is a professor of electrical and computer engineering at Iowa State University. She was named Fellow of the Institute of Electrical and Electronics Engineers (IEEE) in 2016 "for contributions to active learning methods in engineering education".
