= Diane Katsiaficas =

American visual artist of Greek heritage

- Born: November 23, 1947; El Paso, Texas
- Occupation: Artist

Diane Katsiaficas (El Paso, Texas, 23 November 1947) is an American visual artist of Greek heritage. Her work ranges from small journal drawings and paintings to large-scale installations and has been shown throughout the United States and Europe. She is a professor emerita in the Art Department at the University of Minnesota.

== Early life and education ==
Diane Katsiaficas grew up with the dichotomy of being in the stability of a large Greek-American family but constantly moving because of military life. By the time she graduated high school, she had attended more than twenty schools. It is the transiency that informed her to become an artist but not before pursuing a career in chemistry. Katsiaficas received a BA degree in chemistry from Smith College in 1968, then worked in a lab. In 1974, she received an MAT degree in art education from the University of Washington, Seattle, followed by an MFA in Painting in 1976. Even though moving from chemistry to art, chemistry did had an influence on her early work.

== Artwork ==
Katsiaficas is an artist deeply engaged in visual storytelling. Her work has long been inspired by the visual traditions of the Eastern Mediterranean, particularly those rooted in Greek culture, early Christian art, and Byzantine iconography. She creates narratives that span from intricate, small-scale drawings to expansive, immersive installations, employing a diverse range of methods and tools, including digital image laser etching and repurposing tin cans through precise cutting techniques.

Katsiaficas has described herself as a visual storyteller, drawn to narratives and places that resonate with social conscience and responsible practice. For example, her ceramic and wood installation "Neighbors" is in the lobby of East Precinct building of the Seattle Police Department and was part of the discussion around the Capitol Hill Autonomous Zone (CHAZ)'s fate of public art during the Capitol Hill Organized Protest.

== Exhibitions ==
Her exhibitions include:

- "Visualizing the Instincts of Migration": American Center, Alexandria, Egypt, 2001.
- "Migrations": Diana Gallery, Athens, Greece, 2002.
- "Hair Stories": MAEP Gallery, Minneapolis Institute of Art, Minneapolis, Minnesota, 2000.
- "An Allegory of Olives": Terracotta Gallery, Thessaloniki, Greece, January 2004 - February 2004.
- "Migrations": Holter Museum of Art, Helena, Montana, January 2005 - April 2005.

== Selected public collections ==
- Seattle Art Museum, Seattle WA
- Tacoma Art Museum, Tacoma, WA
- Frederick Weisman Art Museum, Minneapolis, MN
- Walker Art Center, Minneapolis, MN

== Awards ==
- Fulbright Scholar Award (two time recipient, 1990-1991)
- McKnight Research Award, 1996–1999
- McKnight Foundation Interdisciplinary Artist Fellowship, 1999
- McKnight Foundation Visual Artist Fellowship, 1995
- Humanities Institute Fellowship, University of Minnesota, 2002

== Selected bibliography ==
- Gleason, Norma Catherine. "Exhibitions. Summer Sets." Artweek vol. 13 nº. 29. September 11, 1982. p. 8, illus.
- Glowen, Ron. "Exhibitions: The Will to Order." Artweek vol. 11 nº 34. October 18, 1980 p. 16, illus.
- Guenther, Bruce. 50 Northwest Artists: A Critical Selection of Painters and Sculptors Working in the Pacific Northwest. San Francisco: Chronicle Books, 1983 p. 62-63.
- Kangas, Matthew. "Exhibitions Down on the Farm: Environmental Sculpture Invitational" Artweek vol. 12 nº 29. September 12, 1981 p. 3, illus.
- Toale, Bernard. The Art of Papermaking. Worcester, Massachusetts: Davis, 1983.
