= Elisabeth Sussman =

American art curator

Elisabeth Sussman is an American art curator. She currently works at the Sondra Gilman Curator of Photography at the Whitney Museum of American Art. In 2013 she was awarded the Audrey Irmas Award for Curatorial Excellence from The Center for Curatorial Studies at Bard College, in recognition of her 40-year career as a groundbreaking curator.
