= Diane Urquhart =

Canadian financial analyst

- Education: McMaster University (BA); University of Toronto (MA)
- Occupation: Financial analyst

Diane Urquhart is a Canadian independent financial analyst and former senior securities industry executive. She is a major critic of the financial system in Canada, a member of the Small Investor Protection Association, and president of the Social Planning Council of Ottawa.

== Early life ==
Urquhart earned a Bachelor of Arts in economics and mathematics from McMaster University and a Master of Arts in econometrics and monetary economics from University of Toronto.

She passed the Partners, Directors and Senior Officers and Registered Representative Examinations for the Canadian Securities Institute, and the Section 16 Supervisory Analyst Examination for the New York Stock Exchange.

== Career ==
Urquhart started her career as a Bay Street research analyst.

=== ABCP ===
In 2008, Urquhart advised the Canadian law firm Juroviesky and Ricci LLP in a case representing 1,800 retail investors that alleged they were defrauded, resulting in "significant financial hardship", by the non-bank asset-backed commercial paper (ABCP). Urquhart appeared before the Parliamentary finance committee's hearings into Canada's frozen ABCP market as one of six witnesses to address the committee where she appeared on behalf of the clients. The witnesses said during their testimony that ABCP had assured the customers that their assets were safe in low-risk investments, but in actuality were in more volatile subprime lending schemes in the United States, resulting in enormous loss during the subprime crisis. She criticized the Ontario Securities Commission (OSC) saying, "[ABCP] have violated provincial securities acts and the Ontario Securities Commission has done nothing and stood by blindly."

In its 2007 financial report, Hamilton, Ontario allowed for a loss of $14.4 Million from the ABCP market, and the city's finance manager at the time, Joe Rinaldo, estimated that on the $97 Million investments into ABCP resulted in a loss that amounted exactly to the loss allowance. In Urquhart's research, she countered that the ABCP was more likely response for a loss of $50 million, and said it would be unlikely that the city would recoup its full principal. She based her estimate on a Superior Court valuation that the loss was at 51 cents on the dollar. In 2009, Canadian securities regulators approved penalties totaling $138.8 million against seven banks involved in the scheme, but Urquhart said that the deal was a "lose-lose" for small retail investors. She further criticized the settlement saying, "Deterrence only comes when the well-paid managers and experts in the banks lose their jobs," referring to the penalties as "minuscule", and warning that they would likely not reform the type of sales practices that led to the ABCP crisis.

Implicated institutions were credit rating agency Dominion Bond Rating Services (DBRS), the Federal Office of the Superintendent of Financial Institutions (OSFI), and the OSC.

=== Nortel ===
Starting in 2009, Urquhart volunteered to assist former Nortel employees, including laid off workers, pensioners, and the disabled in their battle to try and collect their benefits. The company filed for bankruptcy in January that year after an accounting scandal and a slew of mistakes by the company's management.

Typically, banks and other "secured" creditors have access to funds before pensioners, but Urquhart fought for seven years to ensure pensioners were a primary part of a settlement. Urquhart pointed out that Nortel had plenty of reserves for the former employees "There's money. We just think pensioners should get it first." After global liquidation, Nortel raised $7.3 billion. In October 2009, thousands of the affected severed workers gathered at Parliament Hill to protest losing their provincial entitlement to Nortel's creditors.

In 2010, a clause-by-clause review of a bill, C-501, An Act to amend the Bankruptcy and Insolvency Act and other Acts (pension protection), resulted in all mentions of pensions and pension-underfunding to be removed, a huge loss for the victims of Nortel's bankruptcy. Of the changes, Urquhart said she believed they were acting in good faith, but by the end of the year, the disabled employees lost their benefits, and Member of Parliament (MP) John Baird of Ottawa told her that "there would not be legislation to provide help". She remained optimistic that there would eventually be a financial relief package, and wrote a letter to the finance ministers at the federal, Ontario, Quebec, and Alberta levels demanding $80 million be recovered to the Nortel Health and Welfare Trust for the disabled. She contended the money was improperly removed and never replaced. Urquhart testified before a parliamentary committee about the missing money from the trust, and additionally that a $37 million loan to Nortel had not been paid back.

According to Urquhart's data in court filings, lawyers made more than a three billion dollars on Nortel's bankruptcy. The bankruptcy professional fees, drastically reduced the funds available for the former employees. She further noted that $190 Million US in bonuses had been paid out to executives post-bankruptcy.

In 2016, $4.1 billion of a $7.3 billion deal was earmarked for the victims, but Urquhart criticized the deal because United States creditors received 100 cents on the dollar, while the claimants owed funds from their former employment received much less, with disabled receiving only 60 cents on the dollar.

A judge cleared Nortel to end its bankruptcy in January 2017, after eight years and more than $3 billion fees, according to Urquhart's reports, making it the longest and most expensive bankruptcy on record.

== Personal life ==
As of January 2013, Urquhart resided in the Toronto area, specifically in Mississauga, Canada.
