= Diane Van Deren =

American ultra-runner (born 1960)

Diane Van Deren (born February 20, 1960) is an American ultra-runner who won the Yukon Arctic Ultra 300 in 2009. Van Deren had a lobectomy in 1997. She competed in races of attrition measuring 100 miles or more. She was the first woman to complete the 430-mile Yukon Arctic Ultra 300.

A former professional tennis player, she took up running to help stave off epileptic seizures, for which in 1997 she had a lobectomy. This surgery disrupted her ability to judge the passing of time, something which has helped her ultra-running. She was featured in the 2012 CBC documentary The Perfect Runner, directed by documentary filmmaker Niobe Thompson for The Nature of Things.
