= Diane Johnstone =

Australian diplomat

Diane Johnstone was the first resident Australian Ambassador in Kathmandu, Nepal, in 1986. Appointed at age 36, she was one of only seven women ambassadors out of 87 representing Australia at the time.

Johnstone graduated from Sydney University with a degree in economics.
