= Diane Gilman =

Diane Gilman may refer to:

- Diane Gilman (environmentalist)
- Diane Gilman (clothing designer)
