= Diane Wilkins =

American film director

Diane L. Wilkins
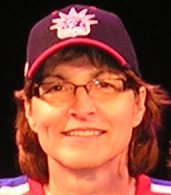
- Born: 1958 (age 67–68)
- Occupation: Filmmaker
- Organization: Diane Wilkins Productions
- Known for: Film shorts
- Website: dianewilkinsproductions.com

Diane Wilkins is an independent award-winning filmmaker from Tallahassee, Florida, best known for high definition corporate and documentary production. Diane also produces gay and disability themed shorts in collaboration with the Mickee Faust Club, a theatre group focused on gay and disability activism. Shorts have screened in film festivals around the world.

== Movies ==
- All Hail Mickee Faust
- Deaf Relay: At Your Service (2009)
- A Gathering Storm (2009)
- Mickee Faust's Gimp Parade (2008) Compilation
- Disability Factor (2008)
- Rats n' Roaches (2008)
- I Know Why the Caged Rats Sing (2008)
- Weimar House (2007)
- Menopausal Gals Gone Wild (2007)
- Dis(aster)abilities: Special Needs for Special Times (2007)
- Boot Scootin' Beauty (2007)
- Just the Funny Bits (2006)
- Taking it Off (2006)
- Cremmate Muffy (2006)
- Excerpts: "A (Movable) Midsummer Night's Dream" (2006)
- The Scary Lewis Yell-A-Thon (2004)
- The Truth (2004)
- Excerpts: "In the House of the Moles" (2004)
- Annie Dearest: The Real Miracle Worker (2002)
- K-Tel: Kurt Weill (2002)
- Martha Steward's Crackhouse Essentials (2002)
- Jake Ratchett (1999)
- Tempted (1999)
- On Becoming a Woman (1999)
- Two Girls in Love (1998)
- The Gay Caballero (1998)
- Hair of the Moon (1994)
