= Diane Prince =

Diane Prince may refer to:

- Diane Prince (rower)
- Diane Prince (artist)

== See also ==
- Diana Prince, a fictional character, the secret identity of the superhero Wonder Woman
