= Freestyle skiing at the 2007 Canada Games =

Freestyle skiiing at the 2007 Canada Games consisted of events in moguls, dual moguls, aerials, slopestyle, big air, and half pipe. Freestyle events were held at the Mount Sima ski hill in Whitehorse.

== Half pipe ==
Medal	Men	Points	Women	Points
Gold	(Alberta) Michael James Henitiuk	41.30	(Alberta) Carly McClelland	30.10
Silver	(British Columbia) Matt Jacob Margetts	40.00	(Ontario) Gillian McIvor (Note: The Cranbrook Daily Townsman reported that silver in women's half-pipe was won by Sarah Hogg.)	28.30
Bronze	(British Columbia) Dean Michael Kappler	37.50	(Alberta) Megan Bilton	25.60

== Moguls ==
Medal	Men	Points	Women	Points
Gold	(Quebec) Cedric Rachon	23.60	(Quebec) Chloé Dufour-Lapointe	23.30
Silver	(Quebec) Marc-Antoine Gagnon	22.86	(Quebec) Alexandra Ann Dufresne	19.64
Bronze	(British Columbia) Tim Scott Crosby	22.17	(British Columbia) Sarah Jane Hogg	18.34

== Dual Moguls ==
Medal	Men	Women
Gold	(Alberta) Michael James Henitiuk	(Quebec) Chloé Dufour-Lapointe
Silver	(Quebec) Marc-Antoine Gagnon	(Ontario) Kylie Ann Sivell
Bronze	(Quebec) Cedric Rochon	(Ontario) Gillian C. Connelly McIver

== Aerials ==
Medal	Men	Points	Women	Points
Gold	(Quebec) Olivier Rochon	87.25	(Alberta) Keltie Diane Hansen	58.67
Silver	(British Columbia) Matt Jacob Margetts	79.78	(Ontario) Gillian Christine Connelly McIver	51.18
Bronze	(British Columbia) Andrew Donovan Pool	66.27	(Ontario) Kylie Ann Sivell	46.81
