= Diane Smith =

Diane Smith may refer to:

- Diane Shader Smith, American writer, publicist, and cystic fibrosis advocate
- Diane Ellingson Smith (1959–2019), American gymnast, teacher, and speaker
- Diane Smith-Gander (born 1957), Australian business executive
- Di Smith, also credited as Diane Smith, Australian actress

== See also ==
- Dianne Smith (born 1965), American abstract painter, sculptor, and installation artist
