= Diane Finegood =

Canadian American chemical engineer

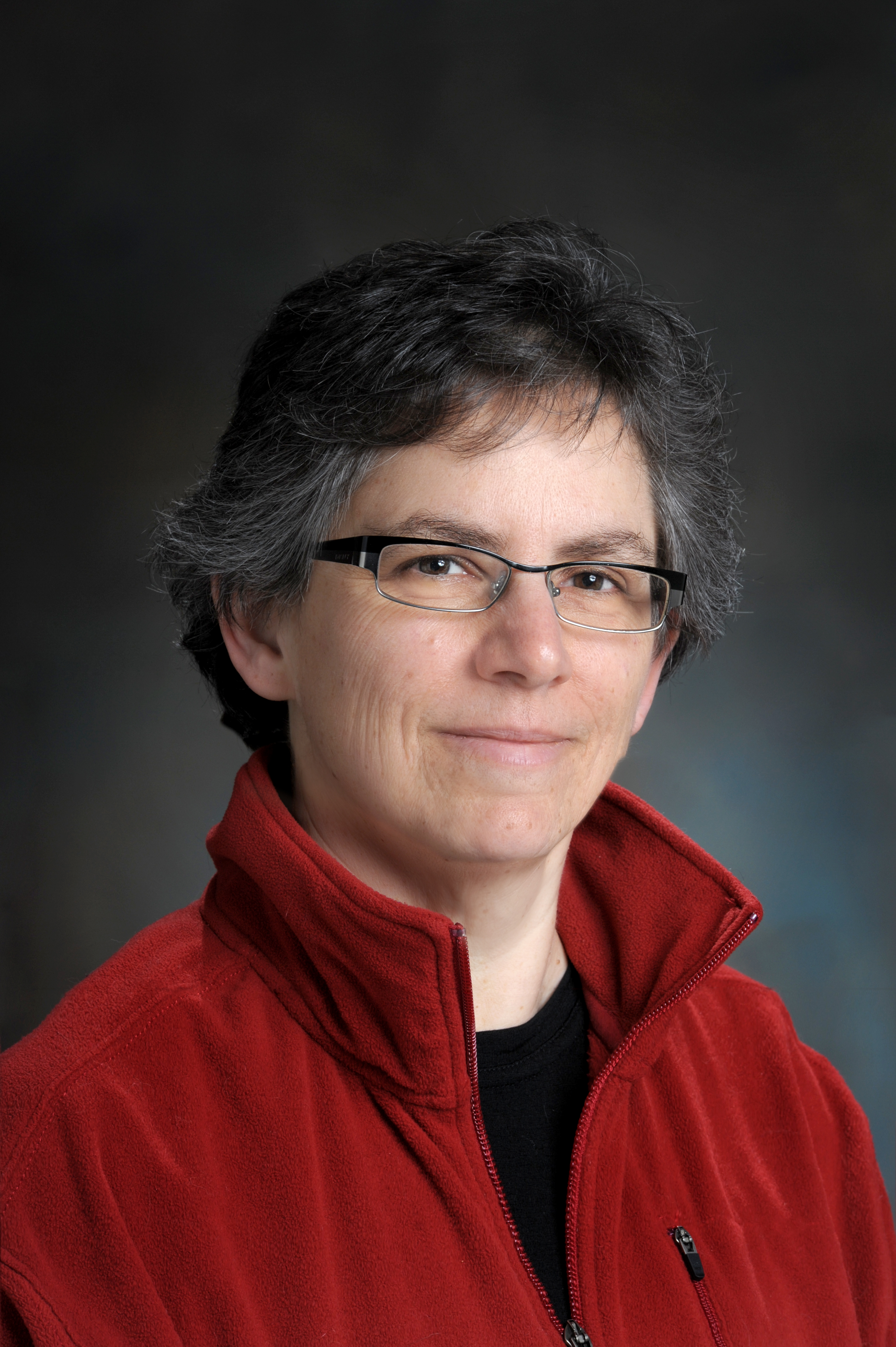
- Finegood in 2011

Academic background
- Education: BSc, Engineering, 1978, University of Michigan; MSc, Engineering, 1979, Northwestern University; PhD, Physiology and Biophysics, 1984, University of Southern California
- Thesis: The minimal model approach to in vivo assessment of metabolic status: a validation and application to growth hormone-induced glucose intolerance (1984)

Diane Terri Finegood is an American–Canadian engineer and physiologist. Finegood was elected a Fellow of the Canadian Academy of Health Sciences in 2007.

== Early life and education ==
Finegood completed her bachelor's degree in chemical engineering from the University of Michigan and her master's degree in biomedical engineering from Northwestern University. Following this, she obtained her PhD in physiology and biophysics from the University of Southern California in 1984.

== Early career ==
From 1984 to 1986, Finegood was a postdoctoral fellow in the laboratory of Mladen Vranic at the University of Toronto. From 1987 to 1996, Finegood was on faculty at the University of Alberta where she continued her basic science research on diabetes and metabolic physiology and began work with the islet transplant group on a basic science research program. In 1996, Finegood moved from the University of Alberta to Simon Fraser University where her research expanded from the pathophysiology of type 2 diabetes to include work on type 1 diabetes. A few years later, her research team received one of two Juvenile Diabetes Research Foundation/Medical Research Council Diabetes Research Partnership grants. With this funding, Finegood began investigating the earliest stages of the immune system's attack on insulin-making beta cells in those with type 1 diabetes.

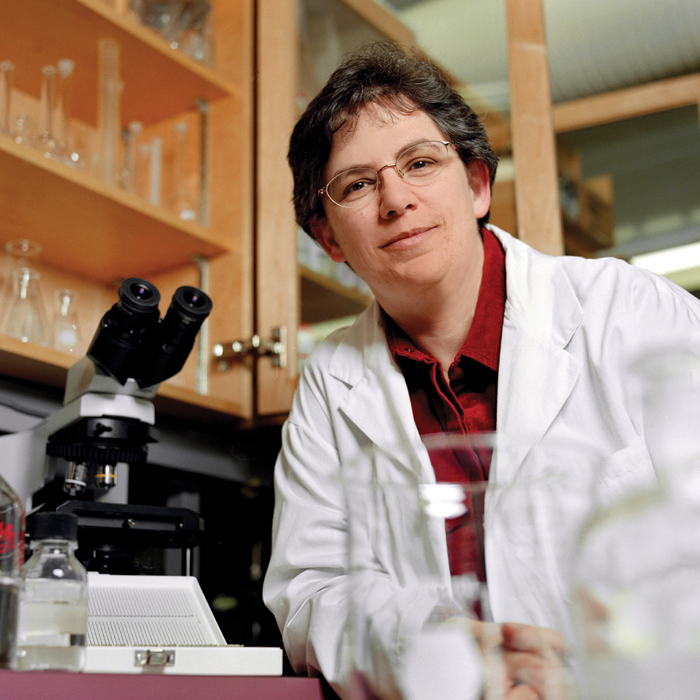
Finegood in 2003

Finegood received many honours and awards during this early part of her career. In 1995, Finegood received Diabetes Canada's Young Scientist Award for the purpose of encouraging "outstanding research conducted in Canada by young scientists in the field of diabetes.". In 2001, she was recognized with the B.C. Sugar Achievement award as someone who has "brought distinction to the university and B.C. by achieving national and international recognition." and in 2002 a Woman of Distinction award "for her ground-breaking diabetes research on the onset of juvenile and adult diabetes."

== Mid career ==
In 2000, Finegood was appointed as the inaugural scientific director of the CIHR Institute if Nutrition, Metabolism and Diabetes. In this role, Finegood began directing research funds towards the obesity epidemic. Her focus on obesity led her to establish a novel public-private collaboration called Canada on the Move with Kellogg Canada. During her time as scientific director, she evolved her academic pursuits towards public-private partnership, systems thinking. and complexity. She stepped down as scientific director in 2008 after serving in the role for eight years.

From 2012 to 2016, Finegood was president and CEO of the Michael Smith Foundation for Health Research where she was responsible for raising $140 million in funding from the provincial government and led the development of a provincial health research strategy.

During this period, Finegood was recognized as a Trailblazer & Trendsetter in the 2006 Top 100 Canada's Most Powerful Women. In 2007, she was elected a Fellow of the Canadian Academy of Health Sciences. She also received the 2008 Frederick G. Banting Award from Diabetes Canada for her contributions to obesity and diabetes.

== Current Activity ==
In 2017, she returned to full time work at Simon Fraser University where she is a professor of Biomedical Physiology & Kinesiology and a fellow in the Morris J. Wosk Centre for Dialogue. She taught the Semester in Dialogue from 2017 to 2023 and received a teaching award for her contributions.

She continues to work on systems approaches to complex challenges. She has written about the importance of systems thinking to public health and to building trust in healthcare. Out of her passion to spread the ideas of systems thinking Finegood launched the Complex Systems Frameworks Collection in May 2024. She has also built a dialogue facilitation practice including national dialogues to inform the Framework for Diabetes in Canada.
