= Diane Austin-Broos =

Australian anthropologist

Professor Diane Austin-Broos FRSN FASSA
- Born: 1946 (age 79–80); Melbourne
- Title: Professor Emeritus

Academic background
- Education: University of Chicago

Academic work
- Discipline: Anthropology
- Sub-discipline: Anthropology of Jamaica and Central Australia
- Institutions: University of Sydney; Monash University

Diane Joyce Austin-Broos (born 1946) is an anthropologist from Australia. She is a Professor Emeritus at the University of Sydney; her major research areas are Jamaica and Central Australia.

== Early life and education ==
Austin-Broos was born in Melbourne in 1946, and attended Hartwell State School and the Methodist Ladies' College in Kew. She won a scholarship to the Australian National University, where she studied philosophy and oriental studies. She also complete a master's degree in philosophy, followed by a short time in a research position for Professor Henry Mayer at the University of Sydney. In 1969 she won a scholarship to the University of Chicago and completed a doctorate in anthropology there in 1974. Austin-Broos returned to Australia the same year.

== Career ==
Austin-Broos lectured in the Department of Anthropology and Sociology at Monash University in Melbourne for over five years; in 1980 moved to a position in anthropology at the University of Sydney. She became an associate professor in 1985 and a professor in 1995, a position she held until her retirement in 2008. She was then appointed professor emerita.

While teaching at the University of Sydney, Austin-Broos introduced two major courses, on social change and the history of anthropological thought, to the anthropology curriculum. She also led a redesign of the first year course and supervised doctoral theses on a wide range of topics.

Austin-Broos is an elected fellow of the Academy of the Social Sciences in Australia (1990) and a past president of the Australian Anthropological Society and the Australian Caribbean Scholars Association. Her 2011 book A Different Inequality was a finalist in the Australian Human Rights Commission’s Human Rights Award for Literature (non-fiction). She is a fellow of the Royal Society of New South Wales (FRSN).

=== Publications ===
- Jamaica Genesis: Religion and the Politics of Moral Orders, (1997) The University of Chicago Press ISBN 978-0226032863
- Arrernte Present, Arrernte Past: Invasion, Violence, and Imagination in Indigenous Central Australia, (2009) The University of Chicago Press ISBN 978-0226032634
- A Different Inequality: The Politics of Debate About Remote Aboriginal Australia (2011) Allen & Unwin ASIN B005DXOPBY
