= Diane M. Mackie =

Social psychologist

Diane Mackie
- Occupation: Professor Emerita of Psychology
- Awards: Gordon Allport Intergroup Relations Prize (1998)

Academic background
- Education: University of Auckland; Princeton University

Diane M. Mackie is a social psychologist known for her research in the fields of intergroup relations and social influence. She is Professor Emerita of Psychological and Brain Sciences at the University of California, Santa Barbara.

Mackie was the honored recipient of the Western Psychological Association Outstanding Researcher Award in 1992. She and her colleague Eliot Smith received the Society for the Psychological Study of Social Issues's Gordon Allport Intergroup Relations Prize in recognition of the theoretical contributions of their 1997 paper, Intergroup relations: Insight from a theoretically integrative approach.

Mackie served as president of the Society for Personality and Social Psychology in 2017.

== Biography ==
Mackie received her BA and MA from the University of Auckland, New Zealand. After completing her BA and MA, she spent a year (1979) working with Willem Doise and Gabriel Mugny as a research assistant at the University of Geneva, Switzerland, which culminated in an edited volume titled The social development of the intellect.

Mackie subsequently attended Princeton University, where she completed her PhD in social psychology in 1984 under the supervision of Joel Cooper. Her dissertation examined effects of social identification on group polarization and was honored as outstanding dissertation research by the Society of Experimental Social Psychology.

Mackie joined the faculty of psychology of UC Santa Barbara in 1984.

Mackie's research program spanned a broad range of topics in social psychology including attitudes and beliefs; social emotions, mood and affect; social influence and persuasion; intergroup relations; stereotyping, prejudice, and discrimination; self-identity and self-cognition. Over her career, Mackie authored many articles and book chapters on social influence and intergroup relations. She and Eliot Smith also co-authored a popular social psychology textbook. Her research was supported by grants from the National Science Foundation.

== Representative publications ==
- Mackie, D. M., Devos, T., & Smith, E. R. (2000). Intergroup emotions: explaining offensive action tendencies in an intergroup context. Journal of Personality and Social Psychology, 79(4), 602–616.
- Mackie, D.M., Maitner, A.T., & Smith, E.R. (2009). Intergroup Emotion Theory. In T.D. Nelson (Ed.) Handbook of Prejudice, Stereotyping, and Discrimination (pp. 285–308). New York: Psychology Press
- Mackie, D.M., & Smith, E.R. (1998). Intergroup Relations: Insights from a theoretically integrative approach. Psychological Review, 105, 499–529.
- Mackie, D.M., Smith, E.R. & Ray, D.G. (2008). Intergroup emotions and intergroup relations. Personality and Social Psychology Compass, 2, 1866–1880.
- Mackie, D. M., & Worth, L. T. (1989). Processing deficits and the mediation of positive affect in persuasion. Journal of Personality and Social Psychology, 57(1), 27–40.
