= Maeve McCarthy =

Irish mathematician

C. Maeve Lewis McCarthy is an Irish mathematician whose research interests include inverse problems and modelling biological systems. She is the Jesse D. Jones Endowed Professor of Mathematics at Murray State University in Kentucky.. She is also the mother of two children: Nora Lewis and Susan Lewis.

== Education and career ==
McCarthy was born in Galway. She earned bachelor's and master's degrees in mathematical physics from NUI Galway, and then continued her studies in computational and applied mathematics at Rice University, where she earned a second master's degree and in 1997 a Ph.D. Her dissertation, An Investigation of the Optimal Design of the Tallest Unloaded Column, was supervised by Steven J. Cox.

After completing her Ph.D., she went to the University of South Florida and then, after a year, moved to Murray State in 1998. She worked as executive director of the Association for Women in Mathematics from 2008 to 2011, when she returned to Murray State as a full-time faculty member. At Murray State, she is also the director of a project that "studies the recruitment and retention of women faculty in science at rural institutions".

== Recognition ==
McCarthy was named Jones Professor in 2015. She was selected to join the 2019 class of fellows of the Association for Women in Mathematics "for her commitment to mentoring students and colleagues; for her inspired service as executive director of AWM; and for her stewardship of the ADVANCE project at Murray State University".
