= Diane Litman =

American computer scientist

Diane Litman is an American professor of computer science at the University of Pittsburgh. She also jointly holds the positions of senior scientist with the Learning Research and Development Center and faculty with the Intelligent Systems department. Litman is noted for her work in the areas of artificial intelligence, computational linguistics, knowledge representation and reasoning, natural language processing, and user modeling.

== Education ==
Litman did her undergraduate studies at the College of William and Mary and her master's and PhD degrees at the University of Rochester.

== Career ==
Before joining the University of Pittsburgh, she was an assistant professor at Columbia University. She additionally held the position of a research scientist in the Artificial Intelligence Principles Research Department Laboratory at AT&T Labs.

Litman has held the position of Chair of the North American Chapter of the Association for Computational Linguistics two times, elected twice for the position, whose tenure lasts four years. She is also a distinguished member of the executive committee of the Association for Computational Linguistics, and a member of the editorial boards of Computational Linguistics and User Modeling and User-Adapted Interaction. She has also held the position of Leverhulme Professor at the University of Edinburgh. Litman was the keynote speaker at the Speech and Language Technology in Education 2013 symposium, the 2006 SIGdial Meeting on Discourse and Dialogue, and at the 2008 Symposium of the Annual Meeting of the Society for the Study of Artificial Intelligence and Simulation of Behaviour. She also sits on the board of the several interest groups, including the International Speech Communication Association's Special Interest Group on Speech and Language Technology in Education. Litman has served as chair, organizer, and a senior member of numerous committees of peer-reviewed scientific journals.

== Awards and recognition ==
She has also co-authored numerous award-winning papers and was awarded senior member status by the Association for the Advancement of Artificial Intelligence in 2011, an award designed to honor those who have "achieved significant accomplishments within the field of artificial intelligence."
