= Daiane Conterato =

Brazilian fashion model

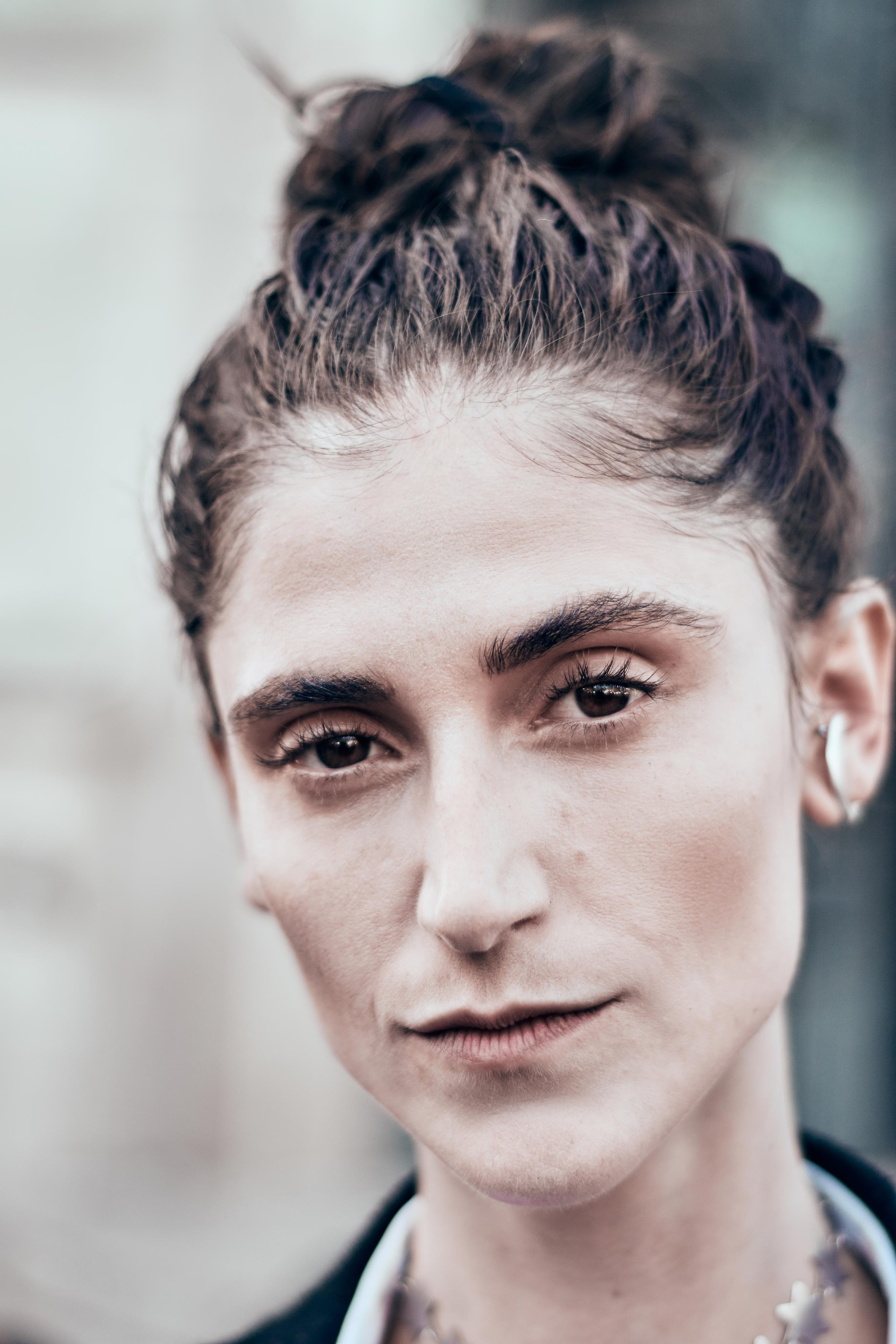
- Conterato in September 2018
- Born: October 17, 1990 (age 34); Porto Alegre, Brazil
- Modeling information
- Height: 5 ft 10 in (1.78 m)
- Hair color: Blonde
- Eye color: Brown
- Agency: Marilyn Agency (New York, Paris); Women Management (Milan); Traffic Models (Barcelona); Elite Model Management (Copenhagen); Stage Tokyo Model Agency (Tokyo)

Daiane Conterato (born October 17, 1990, in Porto Alegre) is a Brazilian fashion model of Italian descent. She is represented by Ford Models Brasil in São Paulo, The Society Management in New York, Elite Milan in Milan, Elite Paris in Paris, Traffic Models in Barcelona, and Bravo Models in Tokyo.

Conterato made her runway debut at the fall 2006 Prada show. During 2006, she appeared on the cover of L'Uomo Vogue and in editorials in V, French Vogue, The New York Times T style magazine, and Vogue Italia. During the Spring 2007 fashion weeks, she opened the Alexander McQueen show and also walked for Chanel. During 2007, she appeared in advertisements for Marc Jacobs, Miss Sixty, Rebecca Taylor and in editorials in Vogue Italia, British Vogue, and Dazed & Confused. In March 2007, she was selected as one of the top ten new models by Marie Claire bookings editor Amy Argento.

During Spring 2008 fashion weeks, Conterato opened the Alexandre Herchcovitch and Christopher Kane shows and closed the Yohji Yamamoto show. She also walked in Spring 2008 couture shows including Armani Privé, Christian Dior, Givenchy, and Jean Paul Gaultier. During Fall 2008 fashion weeks, she opened for Ann Demeulemeester and also walked for Alexander McQueen, Balenciaga, Dries van Noten, Givenchy, and Miu Miu. During 2008, she appeared on the cover of Tank Magazine and in an editorial in Elle. During Spring 2009 fashion weeks, she opened for Alexandre Herchovitch and Proenza Schouler and closed for Ann Demeulemeester. In 2009, she appeared in ads for Akris, on the cover of Brazilian Vogue. and in an editorial in Grey shot by Bruno Aveillan

In Spring 2013, Conterato became one of the campaign models for Christian Dior. She has proved herself as a perennial favorite of both Raf Simons at Jil Sander and now Dior, of Miuccia Prada at Prada and Miu Miu, and Dries van Noten, having walked his show in Paris for seventeen consecutive seasons.
