= Diane Griffin =

Diane Griffin may refer to:

- Diane Griffin (biologist)
- Diane Griffin (conservationist)
