= Diane Kelly (computer scientist) =

American computer scientist

- Education: PhD Information and Library Science, MLS, BA
- Alma mater: Rutgers University, University of Alabama
- Known for: Information seeking behaviors analysis
- Awards: Karen Spärck-Jones Award, 2012
- Scientific career
- Fields: Human-computer interaction; Interactive information search and retrieval; Information search behavior; Research methods
- Institutions: University of North Carolina at Chapel Hill University of Tennessee Knoxville

Diane Kelly is an American information scientist, notable for her work on the analysis of information seeking behaviors and the development of experimental methods to support further research in the field. She holds the Wilson Distinguished Professor chair at the School of Information and Library Science at the University of North Carolina at Chapel Hill. She served as professor and director of The School of Information Sciences and then as Vice Provost of Faculty Affairs at the University of Tennessee-Knoxville.

Kelly's work is strongly user-oriented, with human behavior and interaction at the center of her research. She received a simultaneous PhD in Information and Library Science and Cognitive Science Certificate from Rutgers University in 2004. She graduated with an MLS from Rutgers in 1999 and a BA in Psychology & English from the University of Alabama in 1996.

Other contributions made by Kelly include user modeling using implicit indicators of relevance, interface development and analysis for enhanced user interest and interaction, and new methodologies for designing and evaluating interactive retrieval systems.

She was the recipient of the 2012 Karen Spärck-Jones Award in recognition of her work on information seeking behaviors and analysis.

== See also ==
- Brenda Dervin
- George Kingsley Zipf
