= Diane Grob Schmidt =

American chemist (born 1945)

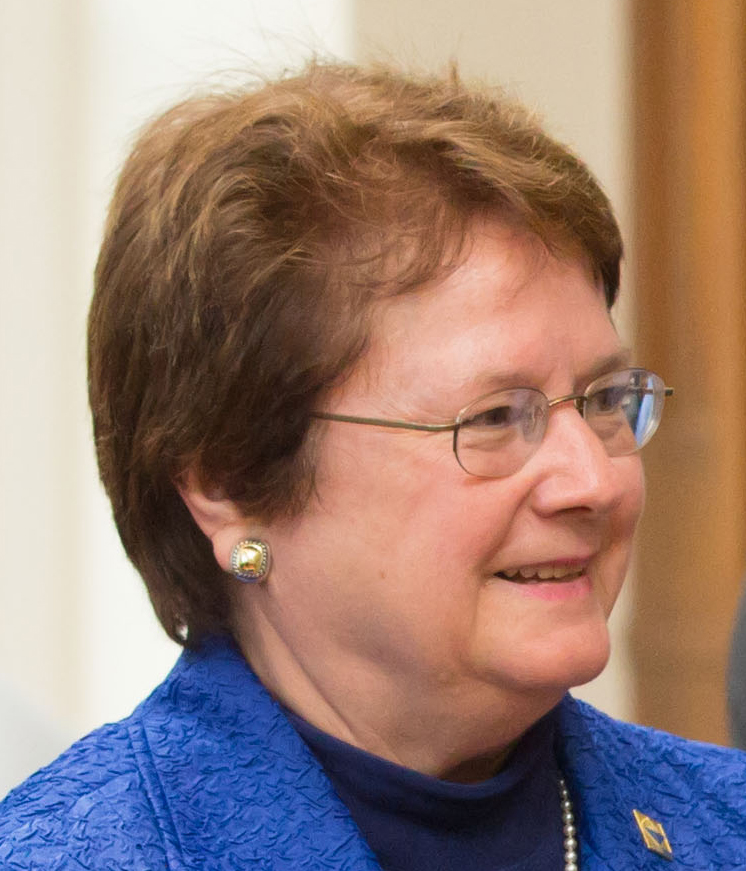
- Education: University of Tennessee at Chattanooga (1967); University of Tennessee Knoxville; University of Cincinnati (1981)
- Scientific career
- Fields: Organic Chemistry, Cosmetic Chemistry
- Workplaces: Procter & Gamble

Diane Grob Schmidt (born November 1945) is an American chemist, who was the executive at Procter & Gamble Co. in Cincinnati, Ohio, from 1981 to 2014. In 2015, she served as president of the American Chemical Society (ACS). As of 2022, she was serving as the chair of the board of visitors for the department of chemistry at the University of Tennessee, Knoxville.

== Education ==
Diane Grob Schmidt grew up in Lorain, Ohio, and Chattanooga, Tennessee. She graduated from Red Bank High School in the class of 1963. She received her A.B. from the University of Tennessee at Chattanooga in 1967, her M.S. from the University of Tennessee, Knoxville, and her Ph.D. in organic chemistry from the University of Cincinnati in 1981.

== Career ==
Diane Grob Schmidt joined Procter & Gamble Co. in Cincinnati, Ohio, in 1981 and retired in 2014. She was appointed as a senior scientist from 1992 to 1997 and as section head beginning in 1997. As a section head, she was responsible for safety and regulatory affairs. She has also been an adjunct professor in the department of chemistry in the University of Cincinnati.

Diane Grob Schmidt holds a number of patents, including a patent for Pert Plus shampoo and conditioner formula. She led the team of scientists at Procter & Gamble who developed Pert Plus, the first combined shampoo and conditioner.

She has served on the editorial boards of the Journal of the Society of Cosmetic Chemists and the Journal of Chemical Health & Safety.

Diane Grob Schmidt is a member of the American Association for the Advancement of Science (AAAS) and of the American Industrial Hygiene Association. She has been a member of the American Chemical Society (ACS) since 1968 and has held a wide variety of positions whose scope has included chemical health and safety, and chemistry & the law. These included three consecutive terms on the board of directors. In 2015, she became president of the American Chemical Society (ACS). Her presidential theme was “Inspiring and Innovating for Tomorrow.” She co-edited 5 books while in the Presidential succession and wrote introductions and chapters in each.

== Awards and honors ==
- 2016, Fellow, National Academy of Inventors
- 2016, Fellow, American Association for the Advancement of Science
- 2014, Distinguished Alumna of the University of Cincinnati
- 2012, Henry A. Hill Award, ACS Division of Professional Relations
- 2011, Fellow, American Chemical Society
- 2004, Fellow, ACS Chemical Health & Safety Division
- 1995, Distinguished Alumna, from the University of Tennessee, Chattanooga
- 1994, Distinguished Scientist of Cincinnati, from the Engineers and Scientists of Cincinnati (first woman so honored)
- Sigma Xi (life member)
- Iota Sigma Pi (life member)
