= Diane Asitimbay =

American writer

Diane M. Asitimbay (pronounced (/ə see´tim bai/)) is an American author, poet, teacher and intercultural trainer.

== Personal life ==
Asitimbay was born on January 26, 1958, and grew up in metropolitan Detroit. Asitimbay's mother was an elementary school teacher and her father was a government employee. Asitimbay has been writing poetry and stories since elementary school. She published her first poem when she was in high school for Pencil Marks, the school's literary magazine. Throughout college, she continued to publish articles, essays, and poems for literary magazines and newspapers.

After graduating in international relations from Michigan State University, she moved to New York City. Before writing her first book, she worked at many jobs, including a copy editor for a legal book publisher, a Spanish court interpreter, a political reporter in Mexico for a daily newspaper, and a history teacher in a New York City public high school.

Asitimbay currently lives in San Diego, where she is an adjunct instructor in the English Language Institute at University of California, San Diego Extension.

== Books ==
Asitimbay's first book on American behavior called "What's Up, America?" (2005), was selected as a finalist for the Fresh Voices Award and the author was praised by reviewers and called "a powerful and important emerging cultural commentator." Following the book's publication, Asitimbay appeared on Fox Tv on the morning "FOX & FRIENDS" show and on KPBS public radio on the "These Days" show. A second and expanded edition of "What's Up, America?" was released in 2009.

This was followed by Asitimbay's second book, a humorous poetry collection for children called "No Perfect People Please!" (2007), which was Silver Recipient for Juvenile Poetry and received an honorable mention by the London Book Festival.

== Themes ==
Asitimbay writes about American behavior and culture, drawing upon her many years of teaching international students as a basis for identifying characteristics unique to the United States. She analyzes American cultural quirks, from the magnets on our refrigerators to the bumper stickers on our cars and then compares American habits to Korean, Japanese, and European customs and describes how cultural practices differ in many parts of the world.

Asitimbay often speaks about the need for Americans to become global citizens and advocates developing genuine relationships with people from other cultures. Her insights have been found useful to a wide array of international organizations and universities including the U.S. Department of State’s Fulbright scholars, the San Diego Consular Corp, the Citizen’s Diplomacy Council, and National Association of Foreign Student Advisors.(NAFSA), California Association of Teachers of the English Language (CATESOL) and the University of California, Irvine.

Asitimbay also examines a wide variety of personalities and experiences from a child's point of view as depicted in her second book. She performs her poetry in local elementary schools in an effort to promote literacy and participates in literary events such as "Read Across America" held every March.

== Bibliography ==
Non-Fiction

- What’s Up America? A Foreigner’s Guide to Understanding Americans. (2005) Second Edition (2009)
  - Fresh Voices” Award, Travel Guide Finalist, Writer's Marketing Association
  - 2010 San Diego Book Awards - Travel Books Finalist

Poetry

- No Perfect People, Please! (Culturelink Press, November 2007)
  - Honorable Mention for Children's Books, London Book Festival 2007
- Silver Award Mom's Choice Awards 2009

Fiction

- My Life as a Cactus, Tales of a Rookie Reporter 2023
- 2017-1018, San Diego Book Awards Finalist - Fiction - Novel
