= Diane Follingstad =

American psychologist and author

Diane R. Follingstad is an American psychologist and author, currently the Women's Circle Endowment professor of Psychology and Director of the Center for Research on Violence Against Women at the University of Kentucky She was previously a Distinguished Professor Emerita at the University of South Carolina.
