= Diane Neumaier =

American photographer

Diane Neumaier (born 1946) is an American photographer. Her work is included in the collections of the Brooklyn Museum, the Pennsylvania Academy of the Fine Arts and the Center for Creative Photography.
