= Diane Gilpin =

British technology shipping chief executive

Diane Gilpin is the founder and CEO of the Smart Green Shipping Alliance that aims to make UK shipping more sustainable through using renewable energy for propulsion. She has previously worked in marketing and technology transfer in telecoms, banking and motor sport.

== Personal life ==
Gilpin grew up in Teignmouth on the coast of SW England. After leaving school at 16 she worked for several years followed by study for a Higher National Diploma at Polytechnic of North London, gaining a distinction. She then undertook postgraduate studies on development economics.

== Career ==
Gilpin has worked within several areas of technology and design, particularly motor racing, yacht racing, renewables and shipping, although her career began on the launch team for Cellnet mobile phones and creating financial information systems for Citibank. In 1985 she was the marketing manager for the launch of Cellnet, one of the UK's first mobile telephone systems, and in the 1990s was involved in the UK launch of 'Horizon', Citibank's first Windows-based dealing system.

She also managed the Benetton Junior Formula Three racing team in the UK for a time in the 1980s and has worked with several Formula One racing teams including Ford and Benetton. Her roles have involved publicity and media relations, pursuing sponsorship but also technology transfer from racing to road cars. In the 1990s and the subsequent decade she moved on to managing racing yacht teams and worked with Logica.

Since around 2009 Gilpin has been involved with making shipping more sustainable since founding and being a director of B9 Shipping while acting as a consultant to B9 Energy. The company designed vessels that were powered by a mixture of sails and biogas engines. Gilpin founded the Smart Green Shipping Alliance in 2013 and continues to be the CEO. The Alliance has brought together experts from 170 countries with the aim for all shipping reaching the UK to be powered by renewable energy by 2030, ahead of the shipping industry's target of 50% by 2050. Ships are typically designed for 30 years of service, so from 2020 new ships must be at least able to be retrofitted to use renewable energy sources. The use of wind power, a traditional means of propelling ships, is being re-examined with new designs as part of this alliance.

Gilpin is a member of the Clean Maritime Council that advises the UK government on strategy to reduce carbon dioxide, particulates and other emissions from the sector.

== Awards ==
- In 2014 B9 Shipping, with Gilpin as Director, was presented with the ‘One to Watch’ award at the Ship Efficiency Awards.
- In November 2020 she was included in the BBC Radio 4 Woman's Hour Power list 2020.
