= Diane Kingston =

English human rights defender

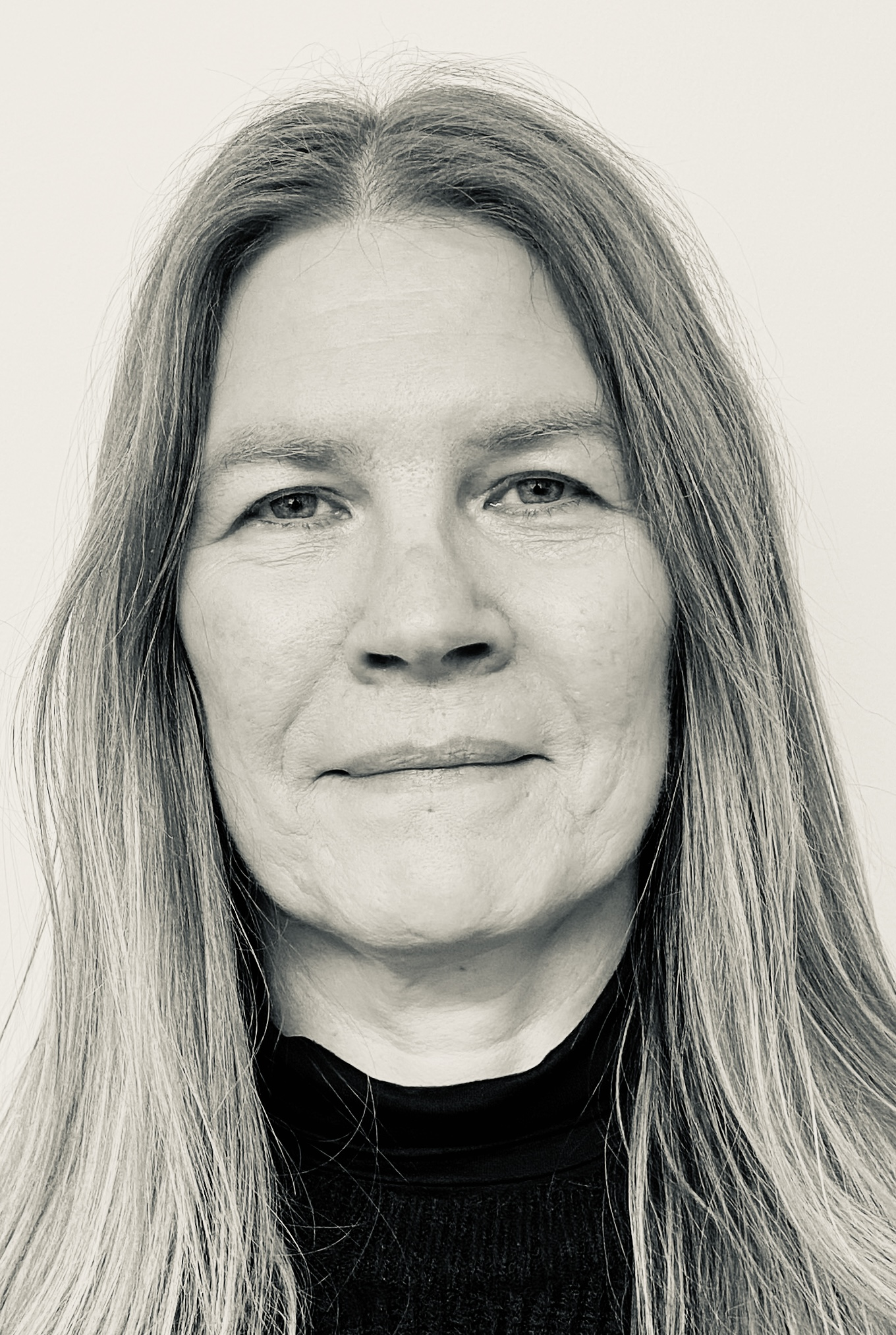
Diane Kingston OBE

Diane Kingston OBE (formerly Diane Mulligan), is a human rights defender and international development specialist. Kingston has spoken publicly about her lifelong commitment to disability rights. From 2019 she was the global technical lead for disability rights and equalities at Sightsavers until she retired from professional life in 2025 due to fibromyalgia. The decision followed a period of managing her fluctuating health while continuing her career promoting disability rights, especially for women and girls with disabilities in low income countries.

== Early life ==
Kingston was born on 4 October 1966 and brought up in Barnstaple, North Devon. She left school with few qualifications, a fact attributed to undiagnosed dyslexia, but was accepted as a mature student at Queen's University, Belfast. She graduated in 1995 with First Class honours in Women's Studies and went on to get a master's degree in Science and Technology Policy from the Science and Policy Research Unit at the University of Sussex.

== International development ==
Kingston has worked on social justice issues all her life, in particular relating to international development and human rights. She worked at the Institute of Development Studies (IDS) as a research officer before becoming the joint Country Director of VSO Indonesia. The loss of a leg in a road traffic accident in Indonesia led to relocation to the UK. Kingston then became the global disability advisor for Sightsavers, where she co-authored policy briefs on the Millennium Development Goals (MDGs) and people with disabilities, and disability and social inclusion. From 2011 to 2017, Kingston was the Deputy Director of Advocacy and Alliances for CBM, a Christian international development organisation. She was the lead author of CBM's position paper on the post-MDG global framework, co-editor of its 2030 development goals publication and author of their infographic showing the relationship between disability rights and the Sustainable Development Goals. From 2017 to 2019, Kingston was the senior advisor for policy and government affairs at Frontline AIDS. In 2019, she authored their publication on linking HIV to the Sustainable Development Goals and human rights. Kingston was a member of the UK’s Department for International Development (DFID) Independent Reference Group on tackling sexual exploitation and abuse and sexual harassment., between 2019-2021 and was a non-executive director of the board of Development Initiatives from 2019-2021.

== Disability rights ==
Kingston became engaged in the national disability arena in the UK from 2006 after her return from Indonesia. Notable achievements in this field have included serving on the Disability Committee of the UK's Equality and Human Rights Commission (EHRC) and membership of Equality 2025, formerly the UK advisory group to Government for disability equality.

She is a former Co-Chair of the United Nations task group for the International Disability and Development Consortium and Chair of the Disability and Development Group of BOND, the UK membership body for organisations working in international development. She supported Go ON Gold, which was a national campaign to raise awareness about the barriers faced by disabled people in accessing computers and the internet. Kingston was appointed an OBE in the 2010 New Year Honours for services to disabled people and to equal opportunities.

In 2012 Kingston became the UK elected member of the Expert Committee for the UN Convention on the Rights of Persons with Disabilities, she served as a UN Expert for a four-year term, including two years as an elected vice-Chairperson. She participated in both the Committee's working group on women and girls with disabilities (Article 6) producing its General Comment, and the communications and inquiries working group. In November 2017, Kingston was a member of an International Review Committee (IRC) invited by the government of Taiwan, to review its initial report on the implementation of the Convention of the Rights of Persons with Disabilities outside of the UN.

From 2021 - 2026 Kingston was a member of the Foreign and Commonwealth and Development Office's External Disability Board

== Work in the health sector ==
From 2007-2011, Kingston was a member of the World Health Organization's Advisory Board for Community-based Rehabilitation (CBR), she was the lead author of that organisation's CBR guidelines component on education. From 2006 to 2007, she served on the British Medical Association's Patient Liaison Group and Equal Opportunities Committee, and had advisory input into two publications: Disability in the Medical Profession (2007) and Disability Equality within Healthcare: the role of healthcare professionals (2007). Kingston has a particular interest in ADHD. From 2006-2008 she was a member of the National Institute for Health and Care Excellence's Guideline Development Group on Attention Deficit Hyperactivity Disorder.

== Other advocacy work ==
Kingston is an official supporter of the Global Initiative to End all Corporal Punishment of Children and has campaigned for a change in the law to allow UK Members of Parliament to job share to enable more people from under-represented groups to stand for Parliament. Since 2017 she has been a Human Rights Advisor to Dementia Alliance International

== Academic work ==
Kingston has been a guest lecturer on disability and international development at University College London. She was a member of the International Disabled People Advisory Committee of PENDA at the London School of Hygiene & Tropical Medicine. and has been a guest lecturer on their Global Disability and Health study unit.

=== Key publications ===
- Kagoya, E., Nakalinzi, J., & Kingston, D. (2025). How women with disabilities determine their gender-based violence priorities. The Lancet Global Health13(1), 1811–1812.
- Eaton, J., Carroll, A., Scherer, N., Daniel, L., Njenga, M., Sunkel, C., Thompson, K., Kingston, D., Khanom, G. A., & Dryer, S. (2021). Accountability for the rights of people with psychosocial disabilities: An assessment of country reports for the Convention on the Rights of Persons with Disabilities. Health and Human Rights Journal 23(1), 175–189.
- Kingston, D. (2017) ‘Can the implementation of the Sustainable Development Goals (SDGs) be achieved without addressing disability rights?’. Disability and the Global South Vol. 4 No. 1.
- Miles, S., Fefoame, G O., Mulligan, D. & Haque, Z. (2012) 'Education for diversity: the role of networking in resisting disabled people's marginalisation in Bangladesh'. Compare: A Journal of Comparative and International Education Routledge.
- Wickenden, M., Mulligan, D., Fefoame, G.O. & Katende, P. (2012) 'Stakeholder consultations on community-based rehabilitation guidelines in Ghana and Uganda', African Journal of Disability 1(1) Article #1.
- Mulligan, D, & Barclay, H. (2009) 'Tackling violence against women – lessons for efforts to tackle other forms of targeted violence', Safer Communities, Pier Professional, Hove, UK.
- Howell, J. & Mulligan, D. (eds.) (2005) Gender and Civil Society: Transcending Boundaries, Routledge, London.
- Mulligan, D. 'The discourse of Dangdut: gender and civil society in Indonesia' in Howell, J. & Mulligan, D.(2005) Gender and Civil Society: Transcending Boundaries, Routledge, London.
