= Diane Lewis =

Diane Lewis may refer to:

- Diane Lewis (architect) (1951–2017), American architect. author and academic
- Diane Lewis (journalist) (c. 1953–2007), American newspaper reporter
- Diane Lewis (Guernsey legislator), British political personality
- Diane Lewis (politician), Utah politician

== See also ==
- Diana Lewis (1919–1997), American movie actress
- Lewis (disambiguation)
