= Diane Mazloum =

French-Lebanese writer

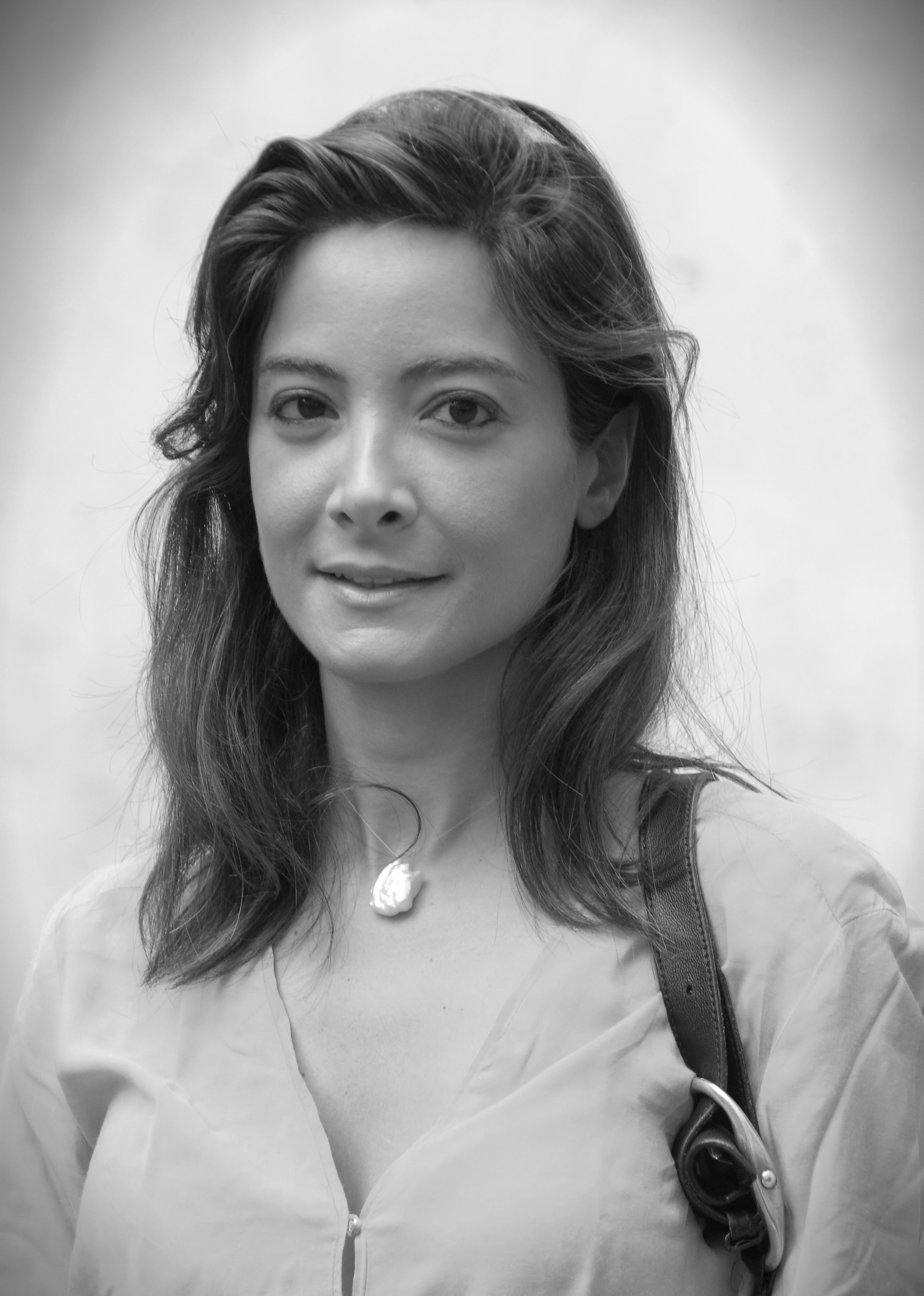
- Diane Mazloum, 2015
- Born: 1980 (age 45–46) Paris, France
- Occupation: writer

Diane Mazloum (born 1980) is a French-Lebanese writer. Her novels are set against the history or present in Lebanon.

== Life and education ==
Diane Mazloum was born in 1980, in Paris, to Lebanese parents who fled from the country because of the Lebanese Civil War. She grew up in Rome and studied astrophysics at Pierre and Marie Curie University in Paris, then moved to Lebanon to study art and design at the American University of Beirut. Later, Mazloum returned to Paris, but she was in Beirut during the 2020 explosion.

== Career ==
Mazloum debuted in 2009 with a graphic novel Nucleus en plein cœur de Beyrouth City. Five years later, she published her first novel Beyrouth, la nuit. Her next novel, L’âge d’or, was awarded the Prix Amic by the Académie Française and the Prix France-Liban, while Une piscine dans le désert (2020) was nominated for Prix Renaudot, Prix Femina and Prix Médicis. Her writing deals with the past and the present of Lebanon.

== Works ==
- Nucleus en plein cœur de Beyrouth City, 2009
- Beyrouth, la nuit, 2014
- L'âge d'or, 2018
- Une piscine dans le désert, 2020
- Le musée national, 2022
