= Diane Atnally Conlin =

American classicist and archaeologist

- Born: 1963
- Alma mater: University of Michigan
- Occupation: University teacher, archaeologist

Diane Atnally Conlin (born 1963) is an American classicist and archaeologist specializing in the art in architecture of ancient Rome. She is an associate professor at the University of Colorado Boulder and directs its excavations at the Villa of Maxentius.

== Career and research ==
Conlin obtained a PhD in art history and classics from the University of Michigan in 1993. She is currently associate professor of art history and classics at the University of Colorado Boulder, where she has received the Boulder Faculty Assembly Excellence in Teaching Award, and was named a President's Teaching Scholar in 2008. She is also a member of the American Academy in Rome.

Conlin specializes in the art, architecture and archaeology of ancient Rome, particularly in the imperial period. Her work includes studies of Roman relief sculpture and marble carving analysis. She is the co-director of the University of Colorado’s excavations at the Villa of Maxentius, on the Via Appia near Rome.

== Selected publications ==
- Conlin, Diane A. (1997). The Artists of the Ara Pacis: The Process of Hellenization in Roman Relief Sculpture. Studies in the History of Greece and Rome. The University of North Carolina Press. ISBN 978-0807823439.
- Political Art in Flavian Rome, 2017
- Jacobs II, Paul W.; Conlin, Diane A. (2014). Campus Martius. The Field of Mars in the Life of Ancient Rome. New York: Cambridge University Press. ISBN 978-1107023208.
- Conlin, Diane Atnally (2013). "Rome, city of: 4. Julio-Claudian". In Bagnall, Roger S.; Brodersen, Kai; Champion, Craige B.; Erskine, Andrew; Huebner, Sabine R. (eds.). The Encyclopedia of Ancient History (First ed.). Blackwell. pp. 5910–5915. doi:10.1002/9781444338386.wbeah16216. ISBN 978-1-4051-7935-5.
- Conlin, Diane Atnally (2013). "Rome, city of: 5. Flavian and Trajanic". In Bagnall, Roger S.; Brodersen, Kai; Champion, Craige B.; Erskine, Andrew; Huebner, Sabine R. (eds.). The Encyclopedia of Ancient History (First ed.). Blackwell. pp. 5910–5915. doi:10.1002/9781444338386.wbeah16120. ISBN 978-1-4051-7935-5.
- Conlin, Diane A.; Heackl, Anne E.; Ponti, Gianni; Gregg, Christopher; Virgili, Paola (2006–2007). "The Villa of Maxentius on the Via Appia: Report on the 2005 Excavations". Memoirs of the American Academy in Rome. 51/52. University of Michigan Press for the American Academy in Rome: 347–370. JSTOR 25609499.
