= Diane Ducret =

Franco-Belgian writer

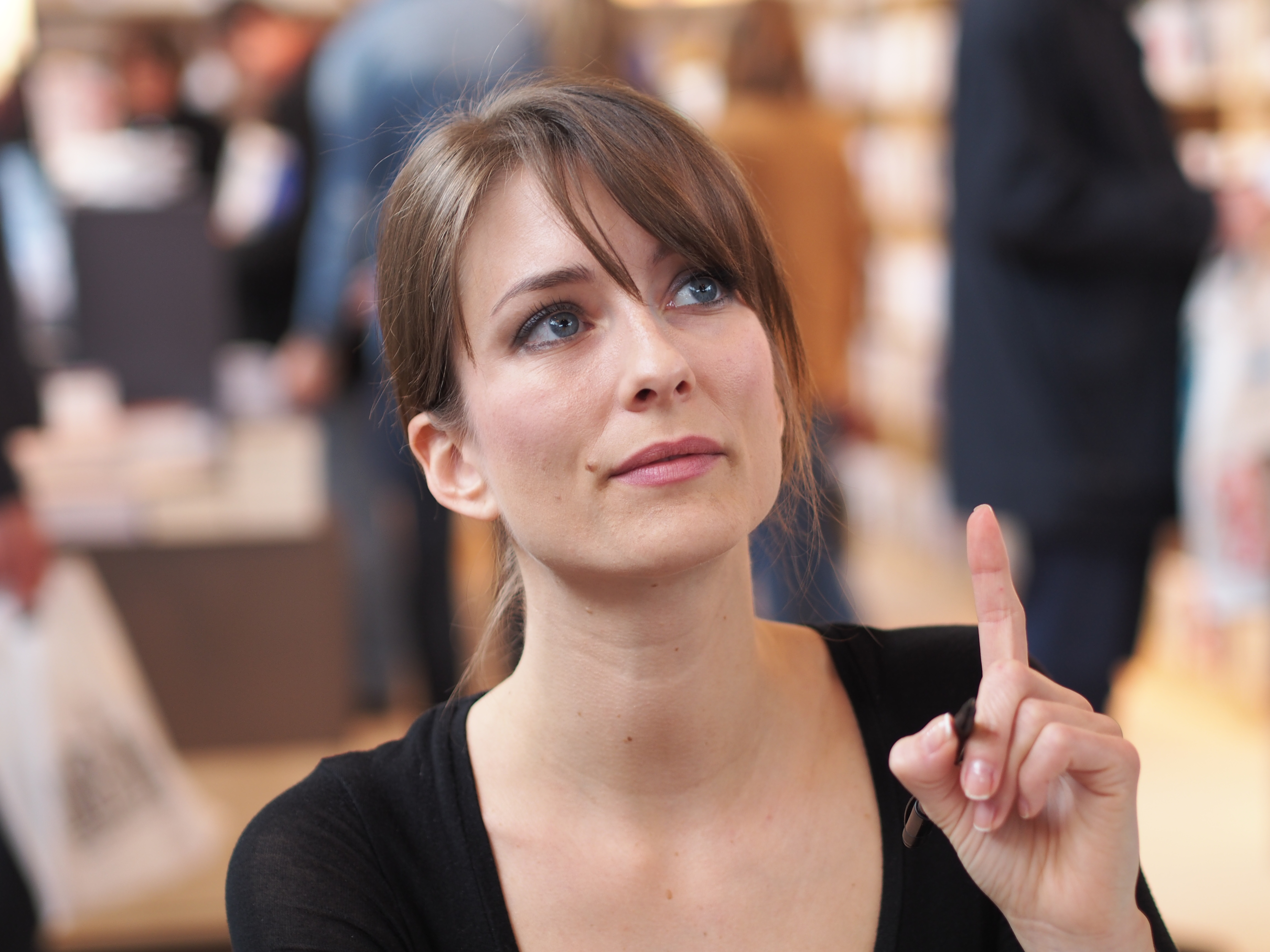
- Diane Ducret at the Salon du livre de Paris in March 2014
- Born: Anderlecht
- Occupation: Author

Diane Ducret is a Franco-Belgian writer. She has published both non-fiction historical books and novels. Much of her writing concerns the historical experiences of women, including studies of women who were closely associated with notorious dictators or gangsters. She has also written comedic fiction, and worked as a writer and host for historical television series.

== Early life and education ==
Ducret was born in Anderlecht, but grew up in The Basque Country.

Ducret studied at the Lycée Molière in Paris (Fr), and then moved to Rome to continue her studies. She then completed a master's degree in philosophy at the Paris-Sorbonne University, with a thesis called La modernité scientifique et la pensée du transcendantal chez Husserl (The scientific modernity and transcendental thought of Husserl). She then obtained a Master of Advanced Studies in philosophy, with the thesis La mort comme critique de la totalité : lecture de L'Étoile de la Rédemption de Franz Rosenzweig (Death as a critique of totality: reading L'Etoile de la Rédemption by Franz Rosenzweig).

== Writing ==
Ducret was a writer for the television series Des racines et des ailes on France 3. She also hosted the program Le Forum de l'Histoire on the television channel Histoire TV.

In 2011, Ducret published her first book, Femmes de Dictateur, a study of the wives and mistresses of 20th century dictators. It was translated into numerous languages and became a best seller.

In 2013, Ducret published her debut novel, Corpus Equi. It won the first place prize for a novel at the La Forêt des Livres festival (the Forest of Books festival). It was also selected as a favourite on the radio literary criticism show Le Masque et la Plume.

Ducret returned to nonfiction writing with the 2015 work La Chair Interdite (The forbidden flesh). The book is an examination of women's circumstances throughout history, studying the methods and effects of misogyny beginning in about 250 BCE. The book ranges from interpersonal relationships, such as the abuses committed by powerful men against women in their personal lives, to violence against women in the form of endemic medical abuse. In 2015, she again published a novel, called L'homme Idéal Existe, il est Québécois (The ideal man exists, he is Québécois), which is a romantic comedy.

In 2016, Ducret published Lady Scarface, about women who were involved in gangster activity, particularly the women who were companions of notorious American gangsters of the 1930s. This work was published in a different format in 2017 as Les Marraines du Crime (The Godmothers of Crime). Also in 2017, Ducret published Les Indésirables (The Undesirables), which is a novel about the mass arrest of refugees by the government of Paul Reynaud in May 1940, and in particular the deportation of single foreign women from the Vélodrome d'Hiver to the Gurs internment camp.
