= Diane Garnick =

American investment manager (born 1967)

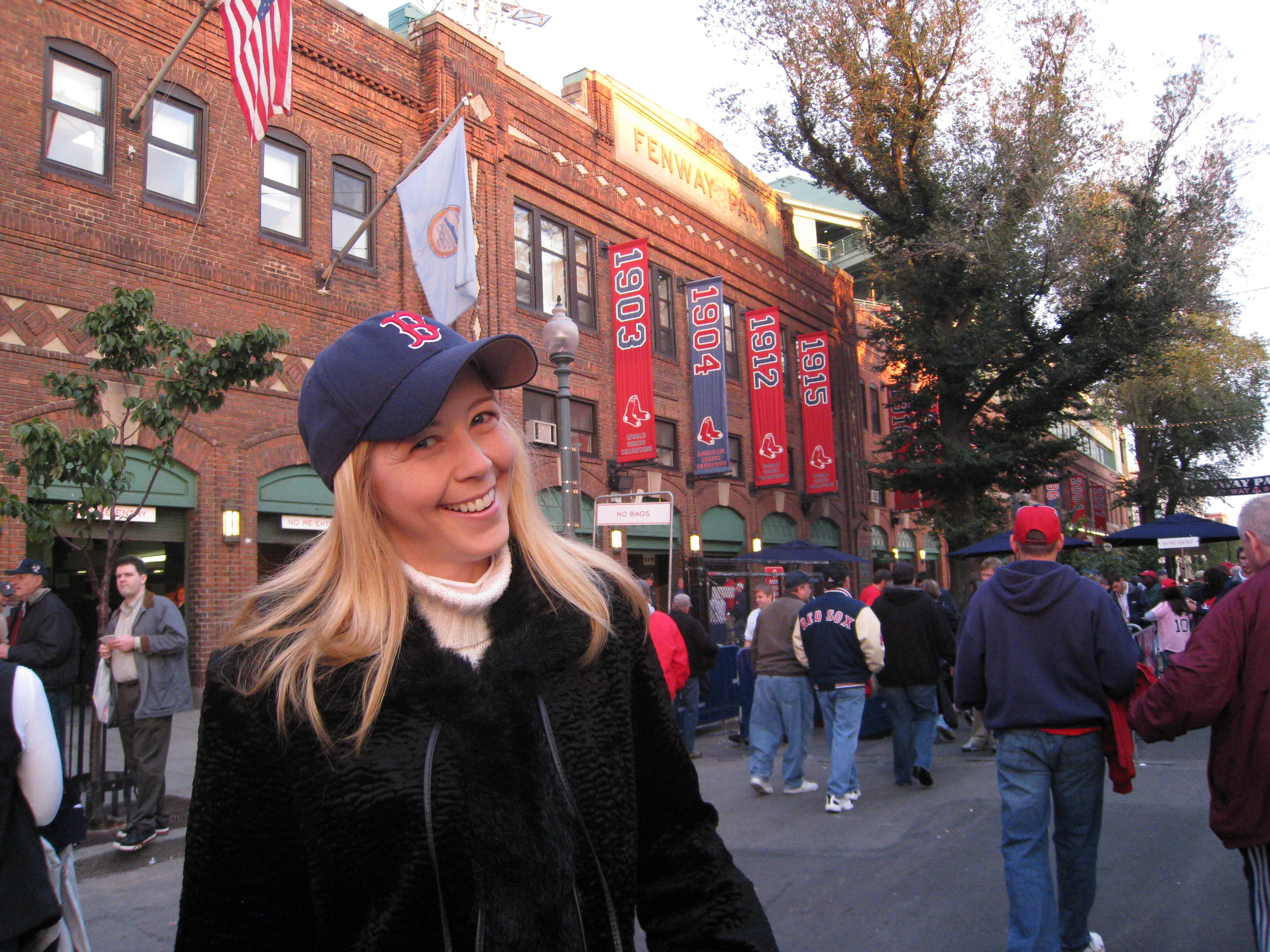
- Born: January 19, 1967 (age 59); New York City, USA
- Occupation: Investment strategist

Diane Garnick (born January 19, 1967) is an American investment manager. She is the chief income strategist at TIAA and serves on the board of the CFA Institute Research Foundation.

== Biography ==
Garnick was born in New York. She was identified as top scholar throughout the United States as a math and science champion in the early 1970s. She was awarded the Presidential Medal in Science in 1980. She has been an investment strategist at several Wall Street firms and three Fortune 100 companies. Her research on retirement strategies have been recognized by academic institutions through Social Science Research Network for original insights into the crisis in retirement income for broad populations including the US and other developed nations.

== Education ==
Garnick initially attended Suffolk Community College in NY. She was named to the USA Today All Star Academics Team. She donated her medal to the community college, which now has that medal and several other awards she received on display. Garnick later went on to earn her bachelor's degree from Hofstra University, and her Master of Business Administration from the University of Chicago Booth School of Business.

Garnick taught a class entitled "The Fine Art of Failure" at Massachusetts Institute of Technology.

== Wall Street career ==
Garnick began her career at Deloitte and Touche LLP. Her projects entailed derivatives product control for clients such as Bear Stearns, Morgan Stanley, and Merrill Lynch. While she was on a project engagement at Merrill Lynch, she was hired to work in Merrill Lynch's Equity Derivatives Research team. In 2001, she joined State Street Global Advisors one of the world's largest passive asset management firms as their Chief Investment Strategist. Garnick later became the Chief Investment Strategist at Invesco, one of the world's largest active asset management firms. Currently she is the Chief Income Strategist at TIAA, one of the largest retirement providers.

Her Wall Street research focuses on all areas of portfolio construction that impact pension plans, foundations, and endowments. She has published reports focusing on equity derivatives, index investing, exchange-traded funds, behavioral economics, taxation, corporate actions, and quantitative investing.

Garnick is a plan sponsor and pension advocate focusing most of her research on issues surrounding how companies and public entities can fulfill the retirement promises made to employees during their work lives and how individuals can plan for their retirement. Her work on hedging risks in the portfolios of plan sponsors is used throughout the world.

== Television ==
Diane makes regular appearances on CNBC, Fox and Bloomberg TV.

== Philanthropy ==
Garnick served on the State University of New York Scholarship Committee. In that role she helps to ensure that the funds she received as a student will be available to help future students.

Garnick served on the Investment Committee of Christus Health, a foundation focused on providing medical care to underinsured patients.

Garnick is supportive of charities that advance the welfare of children, especially direct support to children who are economically challenged. Garnick was named a "Champion for Children" by the Council for Unity.

Garnick was honored for her work with domestic abuse survivors by Take Higher Ground.

== Personal ==
Garnick is married and lives in Greenwich, Connecticut.
