= Diane Pearson (landscape architect) =

New Zealand landscape architecture academic

Diane M. Pearson
- Education: Australian National University
- Scientific career
- Fields: Landscape architecture
- Workplaces: Charles Darwin University, Massey University
- Thesis: The impact of human activity on landscape diversity in space and time : measurement and analysis of spatial structure and change in the Milton-Ulladulla area of NSW (1998)

Diane M. Pearson is a New Zealand landscape architecture academic. As of 2018, she is a full professor at the Massey University.

== Academic career ==
After a 1998 PhD titled 'The impact of human activity on landscape diversity in space and time : measurement and analysis of spatial structure and change in the Milton-Ulladulla area of NSW' at the Australian National University, Peason moved to the Charles Darwin University and then Massey University, rising to full professor.

== Selected works ==
- Aspinall, Richard, and Diane Pearson. "Integrated geographical assessment of environmental condition in water catchments: Linking landscape ecology, environmental modelling and GIS." Journal of Environmental Management 59, no. 4 (2000): 299–319.
- Pearson, Diane M. "The application of local measures of spatial autocorrelation for describing pattern in north Australian landscapes." Journal of Environmental Management 64, no. 1 (2002): 85–95.
- Aspinall, Richard J., and Diane M. Pearson. "Describing and managing uncertainty of categorical maps in GIS." Innovations in GIS 2 (1995): 71–83.
- Davies, Jocelyn, David Campbell, Matthew Campbell, Josie Douglas, Hannah Hueneke, Michael LaFlamme, Diane Pearson, Karissa Preuss, Jane Walker, and Fiona Walsh. "Attention to four key principles can promote health outcomes from desert Aboriginal land management." The Rangeland Journal 33, no. 4 (2011): 417–431.
