= Diane Simpson =

Diane Simpson may refer to:

- Diane Simpson-Bundy (born 1969), American athlete
- Diane Simpson (artist) (born 1935), American artist
