= Diane Bassham =

Plant Physiologist, researcher

Diane C. Bassham is a plant pathologist and professor at Iowa State University.

Bassham earned a bachelor's of science degree in biochemistry at the University of Birmingham, followed by a doctorate in biological sciences from the University of Warwick. She joined the Iowa State University faculty in 2001, where she was promoted from assistant to associate professor. In 2013, Bassham became the first holder of the Walter E. and Helen Parke Loomis Professorship of Plant Physiology. She was invited to join Faculty 1000 in 2017. Bassham was elected a fellow of the American Society of Plant Biologists in 2020, and awarded an equivalent honor from the American Association for the Advancement of Science the following year. In 2022, Bassham was appointed to a distinguished professorship.
