= Rabe Bassham =

American baseball player

- Catcher
- Born: May 31, 1897; Prospect, Tennessee, U.S.
- Died: November 27, 1985 (aged 88); Brecksville, Ohio, U.S.
- Batted: Unknown Threw: Unknown

Negro league baseball debut
- 1932, for the Indianapolis ABCs

Last appearance
- 1932, for the Indianapolis ABCs
- Stats at Baseball Reference

Teams
- Indianapolis ABCs (1932)

Rabe "Ray" Bassham, also listed as Bashum, (May 31, 1897 – November 27, 1985) was an American professional baseball catcher in the Negro leagues. He played with the Indianapolis ABCs in 1932.
