= Diane Poitras =

Canadian video and film artist

Diane Poitras (born 1951) is a Canadian video and film artist.

Her work is included in the collection of the National Gallery of Canada and the Cinematheque quebecoise.
