= Diana (given name) =

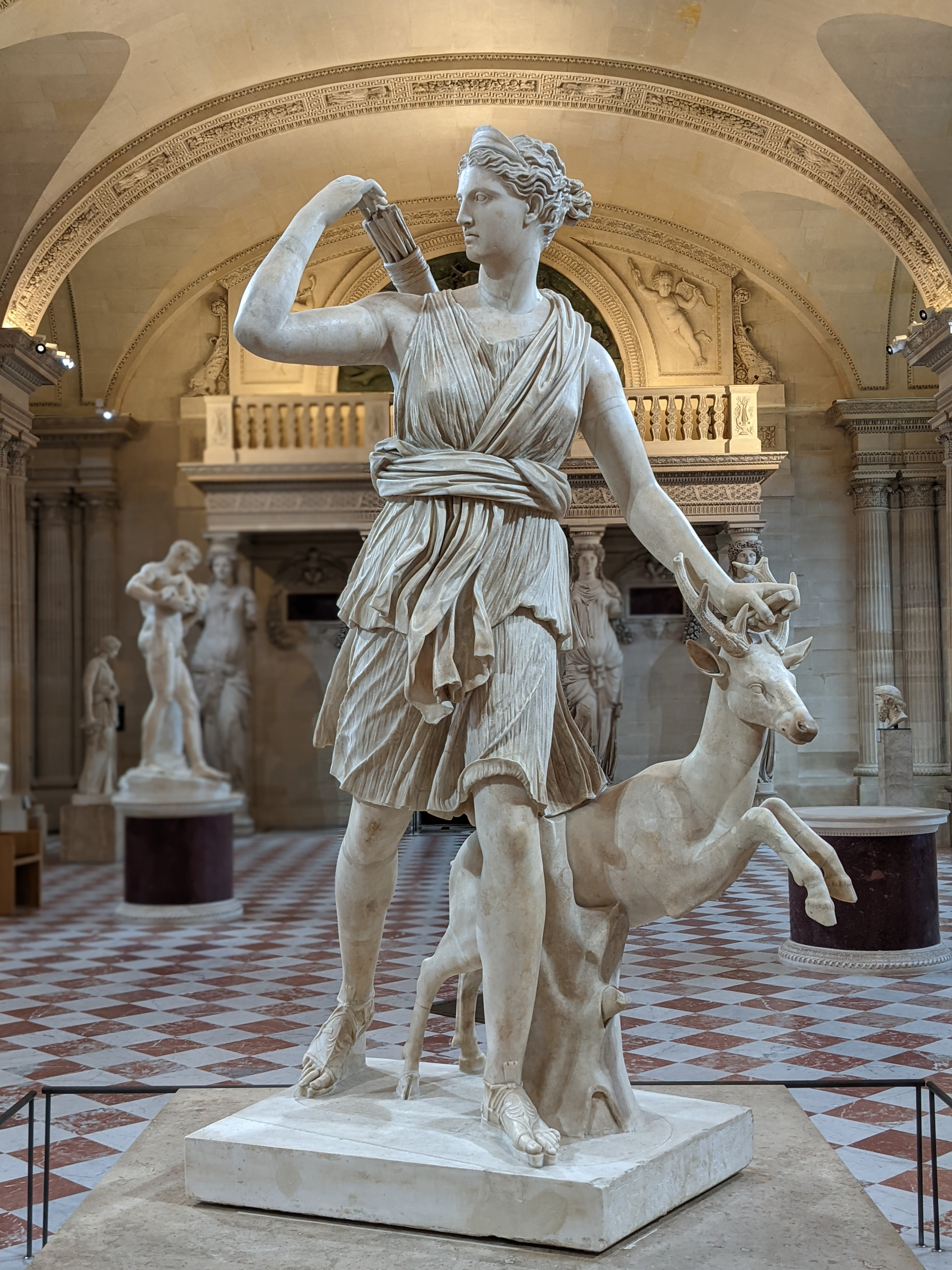
- Diana, the Roman goddess of the hunt.
- Gender: Female

Origin
- Origin: mythological
- Meaning: heavenly, divinity, deity, shine, bright light, like diamond

Other names
- Related names: Deanna, Diane, Dianna, Kiana, Dana

Diana is a feminine given name of Latin and Greek origins, referring to the Roman goddess Diana, goddess of the hunt and the moon.

== Historical development and transmission ==
The name derives from Latin Dīāna (sometimes appearing in older forms as Dīvāna or related to Jana). It is widely understood to mean “divine,” “goddesslike,” “heavenly,” or “shining.”

Diana has been used as a feminine given name since at least the Renaissance, when classical names revived in Europe.

It came into use in the Anglosphere in the 1600s by classically educated parents as an English-language version of the French version of the name, Diane.

== Variants ==
=== Female ===
- Daiane
- Daiana
- Dayana
- Dianella
- Nella
- Nina
- Didi
- Dana
- Di
- Dee
- Dian

=== Male ===
There are no traditional male variants of the name Diana, although there are some names that share the same sound, such as:

- Dion
- Dean
- Dylan
- Dana
- Dian
- Deric
- Derwin
- Dain

=== Unisex ===
- Dana
- Dion
- Dian

=== In other languages ===
- Catalan: Diana
- Croatian: Dijana
- Dutch: Diana, Diantha
- French: Diane
- German: Diana
- Hawaiian: Kiana
- English: Diana, Dianah, Dianna, Dyana, Dyanna, Deanna, Diane
  - Hypochoristic: Di, Dee
- Indonesian: Diana
- Japanese: Daiana (ダイアナ), Diana (ディアナ)
- Latin: Diana
- Portuguese: Diana, Daiana/Dayana, Daiane/Dayane
- Romani: Daiena
- Romanian: Diana
- Russian: Диана (Diana)
- Serbian: Дијана (Dijana)
- Slovenian: Dijana
- Spanish: Diana
- Ukrainian: Діана (Diana)

== Origin and diffusion ==
Diana recalls the Greek and Roman goddess Diana. Diana translates to the Latin form Artemis. The name can be traced back to the Proto-Indo-European root *dyeu or *dyeus and *div- meaning "to shine" (diya-) or "sky", dius, deus and diwio, "deity, god, godlike" and "dium" meaning "universe". The meanings are therefore "heavenly", "holy", "divine", "demonic", "celestial", "cosmic", "nebulous", "chaotic", "abyssal", "void", "luminous", "shining", and in a broader sense "which brings the day", "which has light", "which has divine power", "which belongs to the void/abyss/chaos" and "which comes from the Universe/outer space". The word "Diamond", or "Diamante" in French, is also brought from the Proto-Indo-European word "diya-", which means "bright light".

Diana was already in use as a given name in ancient Rome, but exclusively outside Christian circles, in which it was seen as a pagan name. In Italy, the variant "Daiana", an adaptation based on the English pronunciation, is also common. The French variant "Diane" gained popularity during the 19th century.

== People ==
- Diana, Princess of Wales, British humanitarian and member of the British royal family
- Diana (1948–2024), Brazilian singer

A

- Diana Abu-Jaber, American author and a professor at Portland State University
- Diana Adlienė (born 1954), Lithuanian medical physicist
- Diana Akiyama, American episcopal bishop and academic
- Diana Al-Hadid (born 1981), American contemporary artist
- Diana Álvares Pereira de Melo, 11th Duchess of Cadaval (born 1978), Portuguese noblewoman
- Diana Abgar (1859–1937), Armenian writer, humanitarian and diplomat
- Diana Abla (born 1995), Brazilian water polo player
- Diana Adams (1926–1993), American ballerina and ballet teacher
- Diana Adamyan (born 2000), Armenian violinist
- Diana Aga, Filipino-American chemist
- Diana Agrest, American architect and urban designer
- Dianna Agron (born 1986), American actress
- Diana Aguavil (born 1983), Ecuadorian indigenous leader
- Diana Akhmetova (born 1994), Russian weightlifter
- Diana Al Shaer (born 1987), Russian-born Palestinian dressage rider
- Diana Albers, American comic book letterer
- Diana Alfaro (born 2001), Peruvian footballer
- Diana Allen (1898–1949), American actress
- Diana Amft (born 1975), German film, television actress and children's writer
- Diana Anaid (born 1976), Australian alternative rock singer-songwriter
- Diana Anderson (born 1935), British nurse, midwife and civil servant
- Diana Anderson (scientist), British biomedical scientist
- Diana Andimba, Namibian model
- Diana Andringa (born 1947), Rwandan actress
- Diana Angwech, Ugandan lawyer
- Diana Ankudinova (born 2003), Russian singer
- Diana Arbenina (born 1974), Russian poet, singer, musician and leader of the rock group Nochnye Snaipery
- Diana Archangeli, American linguist
- Diana Arevalo (born 1981), American politician
- Diana Arismendi (born 1962), Venezuelan composer
- Diana Armfield (born 1920), British artist
- Diana Arno (born 1984), Estonian model
- Diana Arón (1950–1975), Chilean journalist
- Diana Arterian, American poet, writer, critic, editor, and translator
- Diana Ashton (born 1955), British swimmer
- Diana Athill (1917–2019), British literary editor, novelist and memoirist
- Diana Atkinson, Canadian writer
- Diana Atwine, medical doctor and civil servant
- Diana Aviv, South African American business executive
- Diana Avsaragova (born 1998), Russian mixed martial artist
- Diana Axinte (born 1996), Romanian handballer
- Diana Ayala (born 1973), American politician
- Diana Aydosova (born 1995), Kazakhstani racewalker

B

- Diana Bacosi (born 1983), Italian sport shooter
- Diana Baig (born 1995), Pakistani cricketer
- Diana Baldwin, American coal miner
- Diana Balmori (1932–2016), American landscape designer
- Diana Bang (born 1981), Canadian actress and writer
- Diana Barnato Walker (1918–2008), British aviator
- Diana Barrett, President and founder of the Fledgling Fund
- Diana Barrington (born 1939), British actress
- Diana Barrows (born 1966), American actress
- Diana Barry (born 1986), Scottish footballer
- Diana Barrymore (1921–1960), American actress
- Diana Basho (born 2000), Albanian swimmer
- Diana Baumrind (1927–2018), American clinical and developmental psychologist
- Diana Bautista, American neuroscientist
- Diana Beaumont (1909–1964), British actress
- Diana Beck (1900–1956), English neurosurgeon
- Diana Becton (born 1951), Contra Costa County District Attorney
- Diana Belbiţă (born 1996), Romanian mixed martial artist, and former kickboxing, judo and kempo practitioner
- Diana Bellamy (1943–2001), American actress
- Diana Bellessi, Argentine poet
- Diana Bendz, American polymer scientist
- Diana Berg (born 1979), Ukrainian activist and graphic designer
- Diana van Berlo (born 1966), Dutch singer
- Diana Bernal (born 1963), Mexican jurist and politician
- Diana Bianchedi (born 1969), Italian fencer
- Diana Bianchi, American medical geneticist and neonatologist
- Diana Bishop (rower) (born 1947), British rower
- Diana Blank (born 1942), American philanthropist
- Diana Bliss (1954–2012), Australian theatre producer
- Diana Block, US author and former militant
- Diana Blok (born 1952), Uruguay-born Dutch photographer
- Diana Blumenfeld (1903–1961), mid 20th-century Polish actor and musician
- Diana Boddington (1921–2002), British stage manager
- Diana Bolocco (born 1977), Chilean journalist
- Diana Bong (born 1985), Malaysian wushu practitioner
- Diana Boulay (born 1946), Canadian artist
- Diana Bourbon (1900–1978), American writer and actress
- Diana Bovio (born 1989), Mexican actress
- Diana Box (born 1971), Spanish handball player
- Diana Bracho (born 1944), Mexican actress
- Diana Braithwaite, Canadian singer-songwriter
- Diana Dilova-Braynova (born 1952), Bulgarian basketball player
- Diana Brebner (1956–2001), Canadian poet
- Diana Brenes (born 1997), Costa Rican judoka
- Diana Bridge, New Zealand poet
- Diana Broce (born 1986), Panamanian model
- Diana Brunel (born 1981), French tennis player
- Diana Bryant (born 1947), Australian judge
- Diana Brydon, Canadian literary scholar
- Diana Budisavljević (1891–1978), Austrian humanitarian
- Diana Buist, American epidemiologist
- Diana Buitron-Oliver (1946–2002), American classical archaeologist and curator
- Diana Bulimar (born 1995), Romanian gymnast
- Diana Burgoyne, Canadian artist
- Diana Burrell (born 1948), English composer
- Diana Butler Bass, American historian
- Diana Buttu, Canadian-Palestinian lawyer

C

- Diana Cabrera (born 1984), Uruguayan-Canadian sports shooter
- Diana Caldwell (1913–1987), English society femme fatale figure
- Diana Canova (born 1953), American actress, director and professor
- Diana Capponi (1953–2014), Canadian mental health activist, psychiatric survivor and community leader
- Diana Carlin (born 1950), American academic
- Diana Carnero (1995–2024), Ecuadorian politician
- Diana Cavallo (1931–2017), American novelist, educator, playwright and performer
- Diana Chalá (born 1982), Ecuadorian judoka
- Diana Chan (born 1988), Malaysian-born Australian cook
- Diana Chang (1924–2009), American novelist and poet
- Diana Chapman Walsh, President of Wellesley College
- Diana Chelaru (born 1993), Romanian gymnast
- Diana Y. Chen (born 1984), Taiwanese figure skater
- Diana Chikotesha (born 1990/1991), Zambian football assistant referee
- Diana Choyleva, Bulgarian analyst and economist
- Diana Christova, Bulgarian sprint canoer
- Diana Churchill (1909–1963), daughter of Sir Winston Churchill
- Diana Churchill (actress) (1913–1994), English actress
- Diana Ciucă (born 2000), Romanian handball player
- Diana Clapham (born 1957), British equestrian
- Diana Coben, adult education academic
- Diana Coloma, Ecuadorian politician
- Diana Conti (1956–2024), Argentine lawyer and politician
- Diana Conyngham Ellis (1813–1851), Northern Irish botanical painter
- Diana Coole, British political theorist
- Diana Coomans (1861–1952), Belgian painter
- Diana Cooper (artist), American visual artist
- Diana Copperwhite, Irish painter
- Diana di Cordona, 16th-century Italian noblewoman
- Diana Coupland (1928–2006), British actress
- Diana Croce (born 1997), Venezuelan model and beauty pageant titleholder
- Diana Crossan, New Zealand public servant
- Diana Çuli (born 1951), Albanian writer, journalist and politician

D

- Diana Damrau (born 1971), German operatic soprano
- Diana Danielle (born 1991), American-born Malaysian actress and singer
- Diana Darrin (born 1933), American film actress and singer
- Diana David (born 1985), Indian cricketer
- Diana Davies (actress) (born 1936), English actress
- Diana Davies (athlete) (born 1961), British high jumper
- Diana Davies (photographer) (born 1938), American photographer
- Diana Davies (swimmer) (born 1940), British swimmer
- Diana Davis (born 2003), Russian-Georgian ice dancer
- Diana Davison, Australian racing driver
- Diana Dean (born 1942), Canadian artist
- Diana Decker (1925–2019), British American actress, singer and TV personality
- Diana DeGarmo (born 1987), American singer and Broadway actress
- Diana DeGette (born 1957), American politician
- Diana degli Andalò, 13th-century Italian Dominican nun and convent superior beatified by the Roman Catholic Church
- Diana Del Bufalo (born 1990), Italian actress, singer and TV presenter
- Diana DeMuth, American singer-songwriter
- Diana Dennis (born 1951), American bodybuilder
- Diána Detre (born 1983), Hungarian windsurfer
- Diana Deutsch (born 1938), British-American psychologist
- DiAna DiAna, American hairdresser and HIV/AIDS activist
- Diana Dierks (born 1944), American politician
- Diana Dimova (born 1984), Bulgarian badminton player
- Diana DiZoglio (born 1983), American politician
- Diana Doherty, Australian oboist
- Diana Doman (born 1998), Estonian-Azeri rhythmic gymnast
- Diana Dors (1931–1984), English actress
- Diana Douglas (1923–2015), American actress
- Diana Dowek (born 1942), Argentine artist
- Diana Dragutinović (born 1958), Serbian politician and economist
- Diana Dumitru (born 1973), Moldovan historian
- Diana Durães (born 1996), Portuguese swimmer
- Diana Durango (born 1988), Ecuadorian sport shooter
- Diana Dymchenko (born 1989), Ukrainian rower

E

- Diana L. Eck (born 1945), American theologian
- Diana Edulji (born 1956), Indian cricketer
- Diana Edwards-Jones (1932–2024), Welsh television director
- Diana Egerton-Warburton (born 1965), Australian medical professional
- Diana Elles, Baroness Elles (1921–2009), English barrister and United Nations representative
- Diana Enache (born 1987), Romanian female tennis player
- Diana Encinas (born 1968), Mexican figure skater
- Diana Eneje (born 2002), Nigerian model
- Diana Eng (born 1983), American fashion designer
- Diana Est (born 1963), Italian musical artist
- Diana Evangelista (born 1994), Mexican football player
- Diana Evans (born 1972), British novelist, journalist and critic
- Diana Ewing (born 1946), American actress

F

- Diana L. Farmer, American pediatric surgeon
- Diana Farrell (born 1965), American government official
- Diana Farrington (born 1965), American politician in Michigan
- Diana M. Fennell (born 1967), American politician
- Diana Ferreira (born 1981), Portuguese psychologist and communist politician
- Diana Ferrus (1953–2026), South African writer, poet and storyteller
- Diana Fessler, American politician
- Diana Filipova (born 1971), Bulgarian badminton player
- Diana Fisher (1931–2023), Australian television personality
- Diana Fleischman (born 1981), American evolutionary psychologist
- Diana Flores (born 1997), Mexican flag football player
- Diana Fortuna (born 1956), American businesswoman
- Diana Fosha, American psychologist
- Diana Fowler LeBlanc (born 1940), Canadian politician
- Diana Francis (peace activist) (born 1944), British peace activist
- Diana Franco (born 1966), Colombian model and actress
- Diana Furchtgott-Roth (born 1958), American economist
- Diana Fuss, American scholar of literature

G

- Diana Galbadon (born 1952), American author
- Diana G. Gallagher (1946–2021), American writer
- Diana Gamage (born 1965), Sri Lankan politician
- Diana Gansky (born 1963), German track and field athlete
- Diana García (cyclist) (born 1982), Colombian track cyclist
- Diana García (footballer) (born 1999), Mexican footballer
- Diana Garcia (poet) (born 1950), American poet
- Diana García (squash player) (born 1992), Mexican squash player
- Diana Gardner (1913–1997), English wood engraver and writer
- Diana Garnet (born 1988), American singer
- Diana Garnham, British science administrator
- Diana Garrigosa (1944–2020), Catalan economist and teacher
- Diana Gaspari (born 1984), Italian curler
- Diana Gee (born 1968), American table tennis player
- Diana Glomb (born 1947), American politician and social worker
- Diana Golden (skier) (1963–2001), American alpine skier
- Diana Gomes (footballer) (born 1998), Portuguese association football player
- Diana Gómez (born 1989), Spanish actress
- Diana Gordon (born 1985), American singer-songwriter
- Diana Gould (dancer) (1912–2003), British ballerina and occasional actress and singer
- Diana Gould (teacher) (1926–2011), British teacher known for an exchange with Margaret Thatcher in 1983
- Diana Gould (writer) (born 1944), screenwriter for television and short story author
- Diana Goustilina (born 1974), Russian basketball player
- Diana Gribbon Motz (born 1943), American judge
- Diana Groó (born 1973), Hungarian film director and screenwriter
- Diana Guardato, Spanish aristocrat
- Diana Guerrero-Maciá, American visual artist
- Diana Gurtskaya (born 1978), Russian pop singer
- Diana Gutjahr (born 1984), Swiss politician

H

- Diana Hacker (1942–2004), American writer and educator
- Diana Haddad (born 1976), Lebanese pop singer
- Diana Hajiyeva (born 1989), Azerbaijani singer-songwriter
- Diana Hall, Australian soccer player
- Diana Hamilton (actress) (1898–1951), British stage actress and playwright
- Diana Hamilton (musician) (born 1978), Ghanaian gospel musician
- Diana Hamilton (writer) (died 2009), British writer
- Diana Hardcastle (born 1949), British actress
- Diana Hargreaves, American biologist
- Diana Harshbarger (born 1960), American politician
- Diana Hart (born 1963), Canadian-American writer and wrestling personality
- Diana Hartog (born 1942), Canadian poet and fiction writer
- Diana Hayden (born 1973), Miss World 1997 from India
- Diana L. Hayes, American Catholic theologian
- Diana Henderson (1946–2019), solicitor, military historian and officer
- Diana B. Henriques, American journalist
- Diana Henry (food writer), British food writer
- Diana Herold (born 1974), German photomodel and actress
- Diana Hill (painter) (c. 1760–1844), British artist
- Diana Hoddinott, British actress
- Diana Holland, British trade unionist
- Diana Hopeson (born 1970), Ghanaian gospel singer
- Diana Huffaker, American physicist
- Diana Hyland (1936–1977), American actress

I

- Diana Ibrahim, Lebanese actress and voice actress
- Diana Ingro (1917–2017), Argentine actress
- Diana Iorgova (born 1971), Bulgarian sport shooter
- Diana Iovanovici Șoșoacă (born 1975), Romanian lawyer and politician
- Diana Isakova (born 1997), Russian activist

J

- Diana Johnson (born 1966), British politician
- Diana Jones, American singer-songwriter
- Diana Josephson (1936–2006), English-American lawyer and public servant
- Diana Jue, American female activist and entrepreneur
- Diana Julianto (born 1984), Indonesian professional tennis player

K

- Diana Kaarina (born 1975), Canadian actress
- Diana Kačanova (born 1993), Lithuanian racewalker
- Diana Kanayeva (born 1997), Russian ice hockey player
- Diana Karazon (born 1983), Jordanian singer
- Diana Kennedy (1923–2022), British food writer
- Diana Kent, English actress
- Diana Keppel, Countess of Albemarle (1909–2013), British noblewoman
- Diana Khoi Nguyen (born 1985), American poet
- Diana King (born 1970), Jamaican singer
- Diana King (actress) (1918–1986), British actress
- Diana Kinnert (born 1991), German author
- Diana Kirkbride (1915–1997), British archaeologist
- Diana Kleiner (1947–2023), American art historian and educator
- Diana Klimova (born 1996), Russian cyclist
- Diana Kobzanová (born 1982), Czech TV host, Miss Czech Republic 2002
- Diana Koltsova (born 2008), Russian para swimmer
- Diana L. Kormos-Buchwald, American university teacher
- Diana Körner (born 1944), German actress
- Diana Korzenik (born 1941), American artist, educator, author, collector, and benefactor
- Diana Kovacheva (born 1975), Bulgarian lawyer and politician
- Diana Krall (born 1964), Canadian jazz pianist and singer
- Diana Kurien (born 1984), Indian actress

L

- Diana La Cazadora (born 1978), Mexican professional wrestler
- Diana Lado (born 1988), Spanish-American actress in Hollywood
- Diana Lebacs (1947–2022), Curaçaoan writer and actress
- Diana Lee (born 1961), American actress and model
- Diana Lee Inosanto (born 1966), American actress, director, stuntwoman, and martial artist
- Diana Lemešová (born 2000), Slovak footballer
- Diana Lennon (1949–2018), New Zealand academic and pediatrician
- Diana Leonard (1941–2010), British sociologist, anthropologist, and activist
- Diana Lewis (1919–1997), American actress
- Diana Lewis Burgin (born 1943), American writer
- Diana Lie, alias of Iranian-Norwegian model Aylar Lie
- Diana Liverman (born 1954), American geographer and science writer
- Diana Lixăndroiu (born 2005), Romanian handball player
- Diana Lobačevskė (born 1980), Lithuanian marathon runner
- Diana Loghin (born 1997), Moldovan footballer
- Diana Loginova (born 2007), Russian singer
- Diana López (taekwondo) (born 1984), American taekwondo practitioner
- Diana López Moyal (born 1962), Cuban musical artist
- Diana Luna (born 1982), Italian professional golfer
- Diana Lynn (1926–1971), American actress

M

- Diana MacManus (born 1986), American backstroke swimmer
- Diana Maddock, Baroness Maddock (1945–2020), British politician
- Diana Maldonado (born 1963), American politician, member of the Texas House of Representatives
- Diana Mara Henry (born 1948), American photographer
- Diana Mashkova (born 1977), Soviet writer
- Diana Mason (doctor) (1922–2007), New Zealand doctor
- Diana Mason (equestrian) (1933–2016), British equestrian
- Diana Matheson (born 1984), Canadian football midfielder
- Diana Maynard, British computational linguist
- Diana Maza (born 1984), Ecuadorian judoka
- Diana McIntosh (born 1937), Canadian musician
- Diana McQueen (born 1961), Canadian politician
- Diana McVeagh (1926–2025), British author on classical music
- Diana Meier, American basketball player and actress
- Diana Meltzer, American music industry executive
- Diana Merry, American computer programmer
- Diana Miglioretti, American biostatistician
- Diana Millay (1934–2021), American actress
- Diana Miller (disambiguation), several people, including
  - Diana Miller (1902–1927), American actress
  - Diana Miller (died 2006), American murder victim
- Diana Miloslavich (born 1953), Peruvian politician
- Diana Mitford (1910–2003), English writer, fascist, one of the Mitford sisters
- Diana Mondino (born 1958), Argentine academic and politician
- Diana Morales (born 1988), Colombian political scientist
- Diana Moran (born 1939), English model, TV presenter and writer
- Diana Morant (born 1980), Spanish politician
- Diana Mordasini (born 1953), Senegalese writer and journalist
- Diana Moreno (born 1987), American politician
- Diana Morgan (actress) (born 1951), American actress
- Diana Morgan (screenwriter) (1908–1996), Welsh playwright and screenwriter
- Ashley Diana Morris (born 1988), Canadian model and actress
- Diana Morrison (born 1969), British singer
- Diana Moukalled, Lebanese journalist
- Diana Msewa (born 2001), Tanzanian footballer
- Diana Muir Appelbaum, American writer
- Diana Mukhametzianova (born 2003), Russian pair skater
- Diana Muldaur (born 1938), American television and film actress
- Diana Munteanu-Druțu (born 1987), Romanian handball player
- Diana E. Murphy (1934–2018), American judge
- Diana Nankunda Mutasingwa, Uganda politician

N

- Diana Natalicio (1939–2021), American academic administrator
- Diana Nausėdienė (born 1964), Lithuanian business manager and lecturer
- Diana Nazarova (born 2000), Kazakhstani swimmer
- Diana Villiers Negroponte (born 1947), American lawyer and academic
- Diana Nekoye Sifuna (born 1987), Kenyan CEO of the Jonathan Jackson Foundation, advocate in public policy and governance
- Diana Nemiroff (born 1946), Canadian curator and art historian
- Diāna Ņikitina (born 2000), Latvian figure skater
- Diana Noel, 2nd Baroness Barham (1762–1823), English peer and evangelical patron
- Diana Noonan (born 1960), New Zealand children's author
- Diana Norman (1933–2011), British author and journalist
- Diana Northup, American biologist
- Diana Nyad (born 1949), American author, journalist, motivational speaker and long-distance swimmer

O

- Diana O'Hehir (1922–2021), American poet
- Diana Ohman (born 1950), American politician
- Diana Olson (born 1969), American rower
- Diana Ordóñez (born 2001), Mexican professional footballer
- Diana Organ (born 1952), British politician
- Diana Orrange (born 1967), American triple jumper
- Diana Ospina (footballer) (born 1989), Colombian footballer
- Diana Ospina (tennis) (born 1979), American tennis player
- Diana Ossana (born 1949), American screenwriter
- Diana Oughton (1942–1970), American student activist

P

- Diana Paliiska (born 1966), Bulgarian sprint canoer
- Diana Palmer (author) (born 1946), American romance novelist
- Diana Panchenko (born 1988), Ukrainian journalist and TV host
- Diana Walsh Pasulka, American writer and professor of religious studies
- Diana Patterson (born c.1951), first woman in charge of an Australian Antarctic Station
- Diana Pavlac Glyer (born 1956), American author, speaker and teacher
- Diana L. Paxson (born 1943), American author
- Diana Penty (born 1985), Indian actress
- Diana Peterfreund (born 1979), American writer
- Diana Petrescu (born 1990), Romanian handball player
- Diana Pharaoh Francis (born c.1967), American writer
- Diana Widmaier Picasso (born 1974), French art historian
- Diana Pickler (born 1983), American heptathlete
- Diana Pineda (born 1984), Colombian diver
- Diana van der Plaats (born 1971), Dutch swimmer
- Diana Plumpton (1911–1973), English amateur golfer
- Diane de Poitiers (1500–1566), French aristocrat
- Diana Popova (born 1976), Bulgarian rhythmic gymnast
- Diána Póth (born 1981), Hungarian figure skater
- Diana Pullein-Thompson (1925–2015), British writer of pony books
- Diana Que (died 2016), Spanish murder victim

Q

- Diana Quick (born 1946), English actress
- Diana Quijano (born 1962), Peruvian actress and model
- Diana Ramírez (born 1990), Colombian karateka

R

- Diana Raznovich (born 1945), Argentinian writer
- Diana Reader Harris (1912–1996), British school principal
- Diana Redhouse (1923–2007), British artist
- Diana Redman (born 1984), Israeli footballer
- Diana Rennik (born 1985), Estonian pair skater
- Diana Reyes (born 1979), Mexican musical artist
- Diana Reyna (born 1974), American politician in New York
- Diana Riba (born 1975), Spanish politician
- Diana Richburg (born 1963), American middle-distance runner
- Diana Rickard (swimmer) (born 1953), Australian swimmer
- Diana Rigg (1938–2020), English actress
- Diana Ross (born 1944), American singer and actress
- Diana Ross (author) (1910–2000), English children's author
- Diana Rouvas (born 1984), Australian musician
- Diana Rowden (1915–1944), British espionage agent
- Diana K. Rowland, American author and skydiver
- Diana Rowntree (1915–2008), British architect and writer
- Diana Russell, Duchess of Bedford (1710–1735), English noblewoman
- Diana E. H. Russell, South African sociologist and activist

S

- Diana Sáenz (born 1989), Costa Rican footballer
- Diana Sands (1934–1973), American actress
- Diana Santos (born 1950), Mexican actress
- Diana Sanz Ginés (born 2005), Spanish gymnast
- Diana Sartor (born 1970), German skeleton racer
- Diana Šatkauskaitė (born 1992), Lithuanian handballer
- Diana Scarwid (born 1955), American actress
- Diana Schmiemann (born 1972), German rhythmic gymnast
- Diana Schuler (born 1981), German snooker player
- Diana Schutz (born 1955), Canadian-born comic book editor
- Diana Scultori (1547–1612), Italian sculptor
- Diana Serra Cary (1918–2020), American child film actress and film historian
- Diana Shaw, American attorney and government official
- Diana Shnaider (born 2004), Russian tennis player
- Diana Shpungin, Latvian American interdisciplinary contemporary artist
- Diana Sierra, Colombian businessperson and industrial designer
- Diana Nekoye Sifuna (born 1987), Kenyan model and public policy CEO
- Diana Silva (footballer) (born 1995), Portuguese footballer
- Diana Silva (model) (born 1997), Venezuelan model and beauty pageant titleholder
- Diana Silvers (born 1997), American actress
- Diana Six, American forest entomologist and academic
- Diana Sorbello (born 1979), German schlager singer
- Diana Soto (born 1980), Peruvian volleyball player
- Diana Souhami (born 1940), British writer
- Diana Soviero (born 1946), American operatic soprano
- Diana Sowle (1930–2018), American actress
- Diana Spearman (1905–1991), British writer and activist
- Diana Spencer (classicist) (born 1969), Irish classical scholar
- Diana Spencer (diver) (born 1934), British diver
- Diana Springall (born 1938), British textile artist
- Diana Staehly (born 1977), German actress
- Diana Starkova (born 1998), French beauty queen, Miss Europe 2016
- Diana Stateczny (born 1980), German snooker and pool player
- Diana Stöcker (born 1970), German politician
- Diana Štrofová (born 1973), Slovak politician
- Diana Sutherland (born 1954), British swimmer
- Diāna Suvitra (born 2002), Latvian footballer
- Diane S. Sykes (born 1957), American judge

T

- Diana Taurasi (born 1982), American basketball player
- Diana Taylor (professor) (born 1950), American academic
- Diana Taylor (superintendent) (born 1955), American business executive
- Diana Terry (born 1956), American judge
- Diana Thorne (1895–1963), American artist
- Diana Tietjens Meyers, American philosopher
- Diana Torrieri (1913–2007), Italian actress
- Diana Trask (born 1940), Australian singer-songwriter
- Diana Trilling (1905–1996), American literary critic
- Diana Turbay (1950–1991), Colombian journalist

U

- Diana Uhlman (1912–1999), English art gallery administrator
- Diana Urban (born 1949), American politician
- Diana Ureche (born 1974), Romanian swimmer
- Diana Ürge-Vorsatz (born 1968), environmental scientist

V

- Diana V (born 2000), Romanian singer and songwriter
- Diana Vaisman (born 1998), Belarusian-born Israeli sprinter
- Diana Valencia (born 1978), Colombian physicist
- Diana Gutiérrez Valtierra (born 1991), Mexican politician
- Diana Varinska (born 2001), Ukrainian artistic gymnast
- Diana Velasco (born 1985), Colombian judoka
- Diana Vicezar (born 2001), Paraguayan entrepreneur
- Diana Vickers (born 1991), English singer-songwriter, actress and fashion designer
- Diana Vico (born 1650), Italian opera singer
- Diana Villavicencio (born 1985), Ecuadorian judoka
- Diana Vincent (born 1958), American jewelry designer and businesswoman
- Diana Vishneva (born 1976), Russian ballet dancer
- Diana Van der Vlis (1935–2001), Canadian-American actress
- Diana Vreeland (1903–1989), American fashion columnist and editor

W

- Diana Walczak, American sculptor
- Diana Walford (born 1944), English physician and academic
- Diana Walker (born 1942), American photographer
- Diana Barnato Walker (1918–2008), English aviator
- Diana Wall (1943–2024), American biologist
- Diana Wallis (born 1954), British politician
- Diana Chapman Walsh, President of Wellesley College
- Diana Wang (born 1990), Dutch Mandopop singer
- Diana Wanza (born 1999), Kenyan long-distance runner
- Diana Warnock (born 1940), Australian politician
- Emily Diana Watts (1867–1968), Jujitsu instructor
- Diana Weavers (born 1975), New Zealand field hockey player
- Diana Weicker (born 1989), Canadian freestyle wrestler
- Diana Wellesley, Duchess of Wellington (1922–2010), British aristocrat and WWII intelligence agent
- Diana Wenman, American television director and editor
- Diana West (born 1961), American journalist
- Diana West (lactation consultant) (born 1965), American lactation consultant
- Diana Weston (born 1953), Canadian-British actress
- Diana Weynand, American film maker
- Diana Whalen (born 1956), Canadian politician
- Diana White (artist) (1868–1950), English painter
- Diana Whitney (born 1948), American author, consultant and educator
- Diana Wichtel (born 1950), New Zealand author, journalist and cultural critic
- Diana Wieler (born 1961), Canadian writer of children's books
- Diana J. Wilkie, American nurse researcher
- Diana Wilkinson (born 1944), British swimmer
- Diana Will (born 1937), Scottish athlete
- Diana Williams (born 1958), American TV journalist
- Diana Willson (born 1934), Irish equestrian
- Diana de Armas Wilson (born 1934), American literary scholar
- Diana Wind (born 1957), Dutch art historian
- Diana Winzenreid (born 1983), American politician
- Diana Gonzales Worthen, American politician from Arkansas
- Diana Kingsmill Wright (1908–1982), Canadian athlete, journalist and activist
- Diana Wynyard (1906–1964), English stage and film actress

Y

- Diana Yakovleva (born 1988), Russian fencer
- Diana Yankey (born 1967), Ghanaian hurdler
- Diana Yeh (born 1975), British Chinese sociologist and social activist
- Diana Yekinni, British Nigerian actress
- Diana Yorgova (born 1942), Bulgarian long jumper
- Diana Yukawa (born 1985), Japanese and British violinist and composer

Z

- Diana Zagainova (born 1997), Lithuanian triple jumper
- Diána Zámbó (born 1978), Hungarian Paralympic swimmer
- Diana Žiliūtė (born 1976), Lithuanian racing cyclist
- Diana Zimmer (born 1998), German politician
- Diana C. Zollicoffer (born 1977), Seychellois actress
- Diana Zubiri (born 1985), Filipina actress
- Diana Zuckerman (born 1950), American health policy analyst

== Fictional characters ==
- Diana A, mecha, Mazinger Z sidekick, after the demise of Aphrodite A
- Diana, a character in the Japanese web manga Centuria
- Diana (Dyosa), a character in Dyosa
- Diana (MÄR), a major antagonist in the manga and anime series MÄR
- Diana (Sailor Moon), a cat character in the Japanese anime and manga series Sailor Moon
- Diana (V TV series), the main antagonist in the 1980s science fiction TV franchise V
- Diana, the main antagonist in the 2016 horror film Lights Out
- Diana Barry, in L. M. Montgomery's Anne of Green Gables
- Diana Lombard, in the French-Canadian animated series Martin Mystery
- Diana Prince, the secret identity of the DC Comics superhero Wonder Woman
- Diana Davis, the main character in series 5 of the television series Sliders
- Diana Cavendish in the Japanese anime Little Witch Academia.
- Diana Wrayburn, a character in the book series The Mortal Instruments.

== See also ==
- Diana (disambiguation)
- Diane (disambiguation)

== Bibliography ==
- Albaigès i Olivart, Josep M. (1993). Diccionario de nombres de personas. Edicions Universitat Barcelona. ISBN 84-475-0264-3.
- Ferrari, Claudio Ermanno (1830). "Vocabolario de' nomi proprj sustantivi tanto d'uomini che di femmine". In Carrer, Luigi; Federici, Fortunato (eds.). Dizionario della lingua italiana (in Italian). Vol. 7. Padua: Tipografia della Minerva. pp. 571–732.
- Galgani, Fabio (2005). Onomastica Maremmana. Centro Studi Storici "A. Gabrielli".
- Sheard, K. M. (2011). Llewellyn's Complete Book of Names. Llewellyn Publications. ISBN 978-0-7387-2368-6.
