= Zollicoffer =

Zollicoffer may refer to:

== People with the surname ==
- Diana C. Zollicoffer (born 1977), American filmmaker and actress
- Felix Zollicoffer (1812–1862), American politician from Tennessee and Confederate general
- Felix Zollicoffer Wilson (1866–1950), American politician from Tennessee
- Octavia Zollicoffer Bond (1846–1941), American writer

== Places ==
- General Felix K. Zollicoffer Monument, monument in Kentucky
- Zollicoffer's Law Office, historic building in North Carolina
