= Diana Frances =

Diana Frances or Diana Francis may refer to:

- Diana Frances Spencer (1961–1997), better known as Diana, Princess of Wales
- Diane de France (1538–1619), daughter of French king Henry II
- Diana Frances (comedian) (fl. 1990s–2020s), Canadian comedian, writer, and business manager
- Diana Francis (peace activist) (born 1944), British peace activist and scholar
- Diana Pharaoh Francis (born c. 1967), American professor and fantasy novelist
- Diane Francis (born 1946), Canadian journalist
- Diane Francis (sprinter) (born 1968), Saint Kitts and Nevis sprinter
