= Diana Henry =

Diana Henry may refer to:

- Diana Henry (food writer) (born 1963), British food writer
- Diana Mara Henry (born 1948), American photographer and photojournalist
- Di Henry, a fictional character in the American TV series All My Children
