= Daiana (given name) =

Female given name

- Gender: Female

Other names
- Alternative spelling: Dayana
- Variant form: Diana

Daiana is a feminine given name.

Notable people with the name include:

== People ==
- Daiana Capdevila (born 1987) – Argentine chemist
- Daiana Cardone (born 1989) – Argentine former footballer
- Daiana Falfán (born 2000) is an Argentine professional footballer
- Daiana Farías (born 1999) – Uruguayan professional footballer
- Daiana Hissa (born 1980) – Argentine politician
- Daiana Alves Menezes (born 1987) – Brazilian actress, singer, and television host
- Daiana Ocampo (born 1991) – Argentine long-distance runner
- Daiana Pacheco (born 2002) – Argentine field hockey player.
- Daiana Santos (born 1982) is a Brazilian politician
- Daiana Serafim da Silva (born 1992), known as Day Silva – Brazilian professional footballer
- Diana Yukawa (ダイアナ湯川, Daiana Yukawa) – Japanese-born British solo violinist and composer
