= Daraj Media =

Media platform covering the Arabic-speaking world

Daraj Media (Arabic: درج ميديا, romanized: Daraj Mīdiyā) is a pan-Arab news platform which launched on 1 November 2017. Daraj was founded by Alia Ibrahim, Hazem al Amin, and Diana Moukalled. Its tagline, "The third story", is a response to their criticism of Arabic media for lacking impartiality.

== ICIJ collaborations ==
The company was among the ICIJ's 95 media partners investigating the Paradise Papers, and Daraj's series on the papers were among its first published articles. Daraj Media was also among the outlets which worked with the ICIJ to publish the Pandora Papers.. Daraj Media is also a menber of the Organized Crime and Corruption Reporting Project
