= Diana Miller (disambiguation) =

Diana Miller may refer to:

- Diana Miller (1902-1927), American actress in silent films
- Diana Miller, Countess of Mértola, eldest daughter of Sackville Pelham
- Diana Miller, American murder victim
