= Diana Buist =

American epidemiologist

- Spouse: Ky Haverkamp

Academic background
- Education: PhD, Epidemiology, 1999, University of Washington; MPH, Epidemiology, 1995, Yale University
- Thesis: Bone mineral density and endogenous hormones and breast cancer risk (1999)

Diana S.M. Buist is an American epidemiologist. She is a senior investigator and director of research and strategic partnerships at Kaiser Permanente Washington Research Institute.

== Early life and education ==
Buist was born to the United Kingdom born physician-researchers Sonia and Neil Buist. She earned her PhD in epidemiology from the University of Washington and her MPH in the same subject from Yale University.

== Career ==
Upon earning her PhD, Buist joined the faculty at the Kaiser Permanente Washington Research Institute (formerly known as the Group Health Research Institute) in 1996. She earned her doctorate degree while working full-time as a research associate in Kaiser Permanente women's health group. In 2003, Buist was appointed the leader of the Breast Cancer Surveillance Consortium registry in Washington. While serving in this role, she received $4 million in federal stimulus funding for her research into improving screening for colorectal and cervical cancer. A few years later, Buist was the senior investigator in a study which found that when women quit hormone therapy, their rates of new breast cancer declined.

In 2015, Buist was named the Group Health Research Institute's director of research and strategic partnerships, while continuing her work as a senior investigator pursuing funded scientific research. During the same year, she co-authored a study with Constance D. Lehman and Diana L. Miglioretti which found that computer-aided detection for breast cancer screening was not as effective as previously conceived. In 2019, Buist was the co-author of another research project which determined a self-collected HPV test provided similar results to those of a physician-collected sample.

== Selected publications ==
- Inhibitors of hydroxymethylglutaryl-coenzyme A reductase and risk of fracture among older women (2000)
- Prospective breast cancer risk prediction model for women undergoing screening mammography (2006)

== Personal life ==
Buist and her husband Ky Haverkamp have two daughters together, Bryn Buist-Haverkamp & Abby Buist-Haverkamp.
