= Diana Spencer (classicist) =

Irish classical scholar (born 1969)

- Born: 1969 (age 56–57)

Academic background
- Education: Trinity College, Dublin (BA (Hons);Royal Holloway, University of London (MA); University of Cambridge( PhD)

Academic work
- Discipline: Classics
- Institutions: University of Birmingham

Diana Jane Spencer (born 1969) is an Irish classical scholar. She is Professor of Classics and dean of liberal arts and natural sciences at the University of Birmingham. Her research focuses on how ancient Romans articulate and explore their own identity.

== Early life and education ==
Spencer was born in 1969. As an undergraduate, she attended Trinity College, Dublin, where she was awarded a BA (Hons) in Modern English and Classical Civilization in 1991. She completed an MA in Late Antique and Early Byzantine Studies at Royal Holloway, University of London in 1992. Her PhD in Classics, awarded by the University of Cambridge in 1997, focused on the Roman historian Quintus Curtius Rufus: her doctoral thesis was titled "The Roman Alexander: studies in Curtius Rufus". During her time at Cambridge, Spencer was a member of St John's College.

== Career ==
Spencer joined the University of Birmingham and was promoted to Senior Lecturer, then to Reader in Roman Intellectual Culture, and finally to Professor. She currently serves as Dean of Liberal Arts and Natural Sciences, and has held the position since the LANS programme was established in 2013. She had previously served as the Director of the University's College of Arts and Law Graduate School.

Spencer was a member of the AHRC's Peer Review College from 2009 to 2013. She is currently a member of the editorial board of the American Journal of Philology and Intertexts, and sits on the Classical Association Journals Board.

She has served as an Ambassador at the British School of Rome (2016–19).

=== Research ===
Spencer's research has focused on a broad range of ways in which the ancient Romans understand and explain their own identities. Her "rich and lively" first book explored the importance of Alexander the Great to Roman notions of self. Her second book, Roman Landscape: Culture and Identity, made "a valuable contribution" to the field of understanding how the Romans understood their engagement with the space around them. She has written extensively on how Roman literature articulates ideas of space, motion and movement, as well as how these patterns of speech help formulate and solidify Roman identity.

== Media ==
Spencer has appeared on In Our Time as an expert on Alexander the Great.

== Selected publications ==
- Spencer, Diana (2002), The Roman Alexander: Reading a Cultural Myth, Exeter Studies in History, University of Exeter Press, ISBN 978-0-85989-678-8
- Spencer, Diana; Theodorakopoulos, Elena (2006), Advice and its Rhetoric in Greece and Rome, Nottingham Classical Literature Studies, v. 9, Levante, ISBN 88-7949-439-2
- Larmour, David H J; Spencer, Diana (2007), The Sites of Rome: Time, Space, Memory, Oxford University Press, ISBN 978-1-281-14963-3
- Spencer, Diana (2010), Roman Landscape: Culture and Identity, Greece & Rome: New Surveys in the Classics, no. 39, Cambridge: Cambridge University Press, ISBN 1-107-40024-4
- Spencer, Diana (2019), Language and Authority in De Lingua Latina: Varro's Guide to Being Roman, University of Wisconsin Press, ISBN 978-0299323202
