= Diana Axinte =

Romanian handballer (born 1996)

Personal information
- Full name: Diana Cristiana Axinte
- Nationality: Romanian
- Born: 16 January 1996 (age 30) Brăila, Romania
- Height: 1.67 m (5 ft 6 in)

Sport
- Sport: Handball
- Position: Centre back
- Current club: HC Dunărea Brăila
- Number: 15

Youth career
- Years: Team
- –2013: LPS Brăila

Senior clubs
- Years: Team
- 2013–: HC Dunărea Brăila

Diana Cristiana Axinte (born 16 January 1996) is a Romanian handballer who plays for HC Dunărea Brăila.
