= Diana Adlienė =

Lithuanian medical physicist

- Born: 2 October 1954 (age 71); Kaunas, Lithuania
- Education: Kaunas University of Technology
- Occupations: Engineer, physicist, professor
- Known for: creating the field of medical physics in Lithuania

Diana Adlienė (born 2 October 1954 in Kaunas) is a Lithuanian engineer, medical physicist and doctor of physical sciences. She is a professor in the Faculty of Mathematics and Natural Sciences at Kaunas University of Technology.

== Life and work ==
After graduating in 1977 from Dresden University of Technology (Germany) with a specialty in physical electronics, she taught in Lithuania at Kaunas University of Technology, 1977–1983 as head of the Laboratory of Ionic Devices at the Department of Physics and became a professor in 2008. She also interned at the King's College London (1999), Malmö University Hospital (Sweden), for three years, and the P. Scherrer Institute in Villigen (Switzerland).

=== Research ===
Adlienė has been called the pioneer of medical physics in Lithuania and has served as a corresponding editor of the international journal Medical Physics in the Baltic States since 2006.

In addition to medical physics, her research includes radiation physics, radiation pollution, nuclear and neutron physics and dosimetry. With her colleagues at Kaunas University of Technology in 2003, she implemented the requirements for the university's medical physics master's study program and helped lay the groundwork for its implementation.

Through her work she has developed and implemented a breast cancer screening database (MAMOLIT) in Lithuania. She has also comprehensively analyzed the effects of ionizing radiation on the environment and the individual and applied the research results to the assessment of the radiation effects of the now-decommissioned Ignalina nuclear power plant in Lithuania.

Currently she is Kaunas University's Principal Researcher of RG "Radiation and Medical Physics."

=== Selected publications ===
Adlienė has participated in five inventions, written educational books on general and nuclear physics and published more than 200 scientific articles.

- Adlienė, Diana, Laurynas Gilys, and Egidijus Griškonis. "Development and characterization of new tungsten and tantalum containing composites for radiation shielding in medicine." Nuclear Instruments and Methods in Physics Research Section B: Beam Interactions with Materials and Atoms 467 (2020): 21-26.
- Jaselskė, Evelina, Diana Adlienė, Viktoras Rudžianskas, Benas Gabrielis Urbonavičius, and Arturas Inčiūra. "In vivo dose verification method in catheter based high dose rate brachytherapy." Physica Medica 44 (2017): 1-10.
- Adlienė, Diana, Karolis Jakštas, and Benas Gabrielis Urbonavičius. "In vivo TLD dose measurements in catheter-based high-dose-rate brachytherapy." Radiation protection dosimetry 165, no. 1-4 (2015): 477-481.
- Puišo, Judita, Diana Adlienė, A. Guobiene, I. Prosycevas, and R. Plaipaite-Nalivaiko. "Modification of Ag–PVP nanocomposites by gamma irradiation." Materials Science and Engineering: B 176, no. 19 (2011): 1562-1567.
