= Diana Meier =

- Modeling information
- Height: 1.88 m (6 ft 2 in)
- Hair color: Blonde
- Eye color: Hazel
- Website: http://www.dianameier.com

Diana Meier is a former professional basketball player and television actress. Diana is known for her hook shot and taught Hakeem Olajuwon his hook shot while attending the University of Houston.

After college, Meier became a professional basketball player overseas in England, Sweden, New Zealand and Spain and spread her enthusiasm for the sport at clinics, promotional activities and with her own radio talk show in New Zealand. Her dream was to come back to the States and advance women's sports.

Since 1989, Meier has hosted and produced W Sportz, a women's sports talk show on Cable; was the first woman to host women's sports on the Fred Wallen Show; and hosted her own radio show, Women's Sports Talk, for 5 years on KPFK. Meier has appeared on over 200 TV shows, usually as an athlete, or detective on shows such as: Strong Medicine, Arli$$, ER (TV series), Coach, and NBC's WNBA Game Patrol. She impersonated Janet Reno on both Safe Harbor (TV series) and Dharma and Greg and was credited as “Inga” on Who's the Boss?

Meier and her identical twin sister Dawn both stand at 6 feet 2 inches. As part of two of the tallest twins in the world, the Meier's have appeared on several national talk shows including: Maury Povich, Montel Williams, Geraldo, and Judge For Yourself. They appeared on Disney's re-make of Escape to Witch Mountain.
