= Nello =

Nello is an Italian masculine given name. Notable people with the name include:

- Nello Altomare (1963–2025), Canadian politician
- Nello Carrara (1900–1993), Italian physicist and founder of the Electromagnetic Wave Research Institute
- Nello Celio (1914–1995), Swiss politician representing Canton Ticino
- Nello Ciaccheri (1893–1971), Italian cyclist competing at the 1924 Summer Olympics
- Nello Cristianini (born 1968), Professor of Artificial Intelligence at the University of Bath, UK
- Nello Di Costanzo (born 1961), Italian football manager and former player
- Nello Falaschi (1913–1986), American football player in the National Football League
- Nello Lauredi (1924–2001), French road bicycle racer
- Nello Musumeci (born 1955), Italian politician and Member of the European Parliament for Islands
- Nello Pagani (1911–2003), Italian Grand Prix motorcycle road racer and Formula One driver
- Nello Pazzafini (1933–1997), Italian actor who appeared in gladiator movies and Spaghetti Westerns
- Nello Rosselli (1900–1937), Italian Socialist leader and historian
- Nello Russo (born 1981), Italian football (soccer) striker
- Nello Santi (1931–2020), Italian conductor
- Nello Sforacchi (1922–2016), Italian racing cyclist
- Nello Matías Sosa, Argentine football player
- Nickname of C. L. R. James, Trinidadian journalist, historian, and socialist
