= Diana Anderson =

British nurse, midwife and civil servant (1935–1995)

- Born: 29 January 1935; Portsmouth, England
- Died: 18 September 1995 (aged 60); St Margaret's at Cliffe, England
- Military career
- Allegiance: United Kingdom
- Branch: British Army
- Service years: 1958–c. 1992
- Rank: Colonel
- Unit: Queen Alexandra's Royal Army Nursing Corps
- Awards: Royal Red Cross; Officer of the Order of St John

Colonel Diana Geraldine Mary Anderson, RRC, OStJ (29 January 1935 – 18 September 1995) was a British nurse, midwife and civil servant.

== Career ==
She began training as a nurse in 1952, aged 17, at the Royal Surrey County Hospital in Guildford. She later trained as a midwife, a trade she practiced in military hospitals after becoming a Nursing Officer for Queen Alexandra's Royal Army Nursing Corps (QARANC) in February 1958. She later began training others in midwifery and became an examiner of the Central Midwives Board.

After being promoted to colonel she was named Matron of the QEMH Woolwich. Other posts followed which included Deputy Medical Nursing at Headquarters BAOR. She was promoted to Colonel Commandant at the QARANC Centre in Aldershot.

Anderson died on 18 September 1995, at the age of 60.

== Awards ==
She has been awarded the Royal Red Cross and, previously, the Associate Royal Red Cross.
