= Diana Munteanu-Druțu =

Romanian handball player (born 1987)

Diana Munteanu Drutu
Personal information
- Full name: Diana Mihaela Munteanu Drutu
- Nationality: Romanian
- Born: 1 May 1987 (age 39) Galați, Romania
- Height: 1.89 m (6 ft 2 in)

Sport
- Sport: Handball
- Position: Left back
- Current club: Gloria Buzău

Youth career
- Years: Team
- –: CSȘ Galați

Senior clubs
- Years: Team
- 2006–2008: CS Tomis Constanța
- 2008–2012: HC Oțelul Galați
- 2012–2014: Corona Brașov
- 2014–2016: HCM Roman
- 2017–2019: Dunărea Brăila
- 2019–: Gloria Buzău
National team
Years	Team	Apps	(Gls)
2012–	Romania	15	(17)

Diana Mihaela Druțu-Munteanu (born 1 May 1987) is a Romanian handballer who plays for Gloria Buzău.

== Individual awards ==
- Liga Națională Top Scorer: 2012
- 3rd Place 2010 Otelul Galati
- Quarters Cup Winners Cup 2011 Otelul Galati
- 3rf Place 2012 Tomis Constanta
