= Daiana Hissa =

Argentine politician

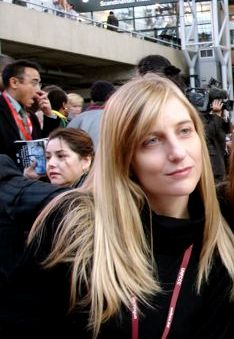
- in Copenhagen
- Born: 2 May 1980 (age 44); San Luis
- Education: National University of Córdoba
- Occupation: politician

Daiana Hissa (born 1980) is an Argentine politician who became a provincial government minister at the age of 29.

== Life ==
Hissa was born in San Luis on 2 May 1980. She was educated at the National University of Córdoba. She was Minister of Environment for the Province of San Luis and she was Vice President of the Federal Council of Environment of Argentina (COFEMA) from September 2009 to December 2015. She was appointed to the post of Minister when she was 29 years old in the second term of the Governor of the Province of San Luis, Alberto Rodríguez Saá. She was then ratified in December 2011 by the subsequent governor of the Province Claudio Poggi.
