= Diana Anderson (scientist) =

British biomedical scientist

Diana Anderson MBE
- Education: University of Manchester; University of Wales
- Scientific career
- Institutions: University of Bradford
- Thesis: Drug resistant variants in mammalian cells in vitro. (1973)

Diana Anderson MBE was a British biomedical scientist who is a professor at the University of Bradford. Her research has focussed on early cancer detection and genome stability. She was appointed an Order of the British Empire in 2022 for her services to cancer detection.

== Early life and education ==
Anderson was an undergraduate student at the University of Wales, where she specialised in biology. She moved to the University of Manchester for graduate studies and completed a master's degree in 1971. She remained at Manchester for doctoral research, and in 1973 completed her PhD in oncology.

== Research and career ==
In 1974, Anderson was appointed Head of Mutagenesis Studies at the Imperial Chemical Industries Central Toxicology Laboratory. She worked with the laboratory to identify the relationship between cancer in employees and the plastic with which they were working. Whilst she did not establish a significant dependence, she did show that there were damaged chromosomes in cancer patients, which informed the future of her research. In 1981, she started working with British Industrial Biological Research Association, where she began to explore cancer in migraine sufferers and women who use health clubs. She developed the "comet assay", which allows for detection of DNA damage with extraordinary sensitivity. Healthy chromosomes do not present Comet-like tails.

Anderson joined the University of Bradford as Chair of Biomedical Research and continued to work on comet assays. She showed that comets were present in the chromosomes of people with colon and lung cancer. She worked with Mojgan Najafzadeh on the development of the comet assay test. She worked with IMSTAR to develop an accurate test for clinical trials. Ultimately, this test may offer a universal test for cancer.

Anderson has worked on genome stability in the umbilical cord blood. She showed that the damaged DNA of smoking fathers can pass to children, and advised fathers to stop smoking for 3 months prior to conception.

Anderson was appointed Member of the Order of the British Empire (MBE) in the 2022 New Year Honours for services to genetics and reproductive toxicology.

== Awards and honours ==
- 2011 Yorkshire Forward Enterprise Fellow
- 2015 University of Bradford Vice Chancellor's Award for Outstanding Achievement
- 2018 The English Women's Awards
- 2022 Member of the British Empire (MBE)

== Selected publications ==
- R R Tice; E Agurell; D Anderson; et al. (2000). "Single cell gel/comet assay: guidelines for in vitro and in vivo genetic toxicology testing". Environmental and Molecular Mutagenesis. 35 (3): 206–21. doi:10.1002/(SICI)1098-2280(2000)35:3<206::AID-EM8>3.0.CO;2-J. ISSN 0893-6692. PMID 10737956. Wikidata Q28140019.
- R J Albertini; Diana Anderson; G R Douglas; et al. (1 August 2000). "IPCS guidelines for the monitoring of genotoxic effects of carcinogens in humans. International Programme on Chemical Safety". Mutation Research. 463 (2): 111–172. doi:10.1016/S1383-5742(00)00049-1. ISSN 1383-5718. PMID 10913908. Wikidata Q63439742.
- Diana Anderson; T W Yu; B J Phillips; P Schmezer (1 May 1994). "The effect of various antioxidants and other modifying agents on oxygen-radical-generated DNA damage in human lymphocytes in the COMET assay". Mutation Research. 307 (1): 261–271. doi:10.1016/0027-5107(94)90300-X. ISSN 1383-5718. PMID 7513806. Wikidata Q63439846.
