= Diana Shpungin =

Latvian multidisciplinary artist

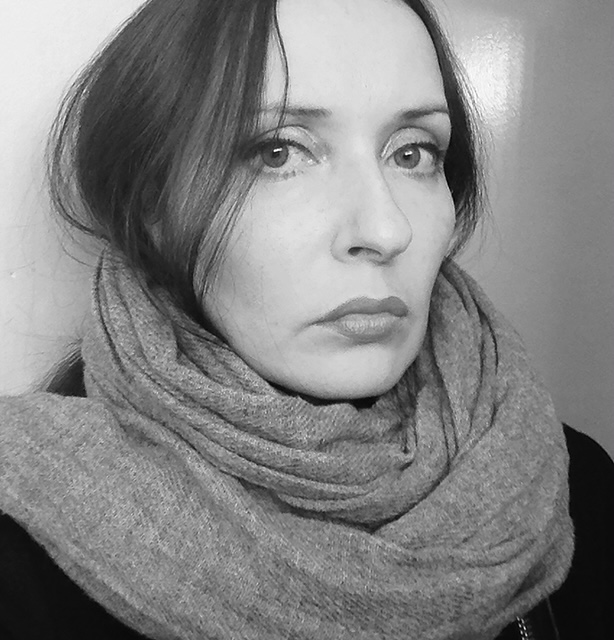
- Diana Shpungin
- Born: Riga, Latvia (former USSR)
- Education: School of Visual Arts (MFA)
- Known for: Sculpture, drawing, installation, hand-drawn pencil animation, performance
- Notable work: "Drawing Of A House (Triptych)" (2016)
- Movement: Contemporary Art Conceptual Art

Diana Shpungin is a Latvian-born American multidisciplinary artist. She is known for her work in drawing, sculpture, installation, performance, video, sound, and hand-drawn pencil animation. Her work explores non-traditional ideas of drawing through sculptural and time-based processes.

== Early life and education ==
Diana Shpungin was born in Riga, Latvia under Soviet rule. As a child she emigrated with her family to the United States, where they settled in New York City. Shpungin earned an MFA from the School of Visual Arts in New York and has taught and lectured at multiple institutions. She is currently an associate professor at Parsons School of Design.

== Career ==
=== Early collaboration ===
Through the early 2000s, Shpungin engaged in a collaborative practice creating stylized, performative videos and installations that explored themes like the intimacy of friendship.

=== Themes and concepts ===
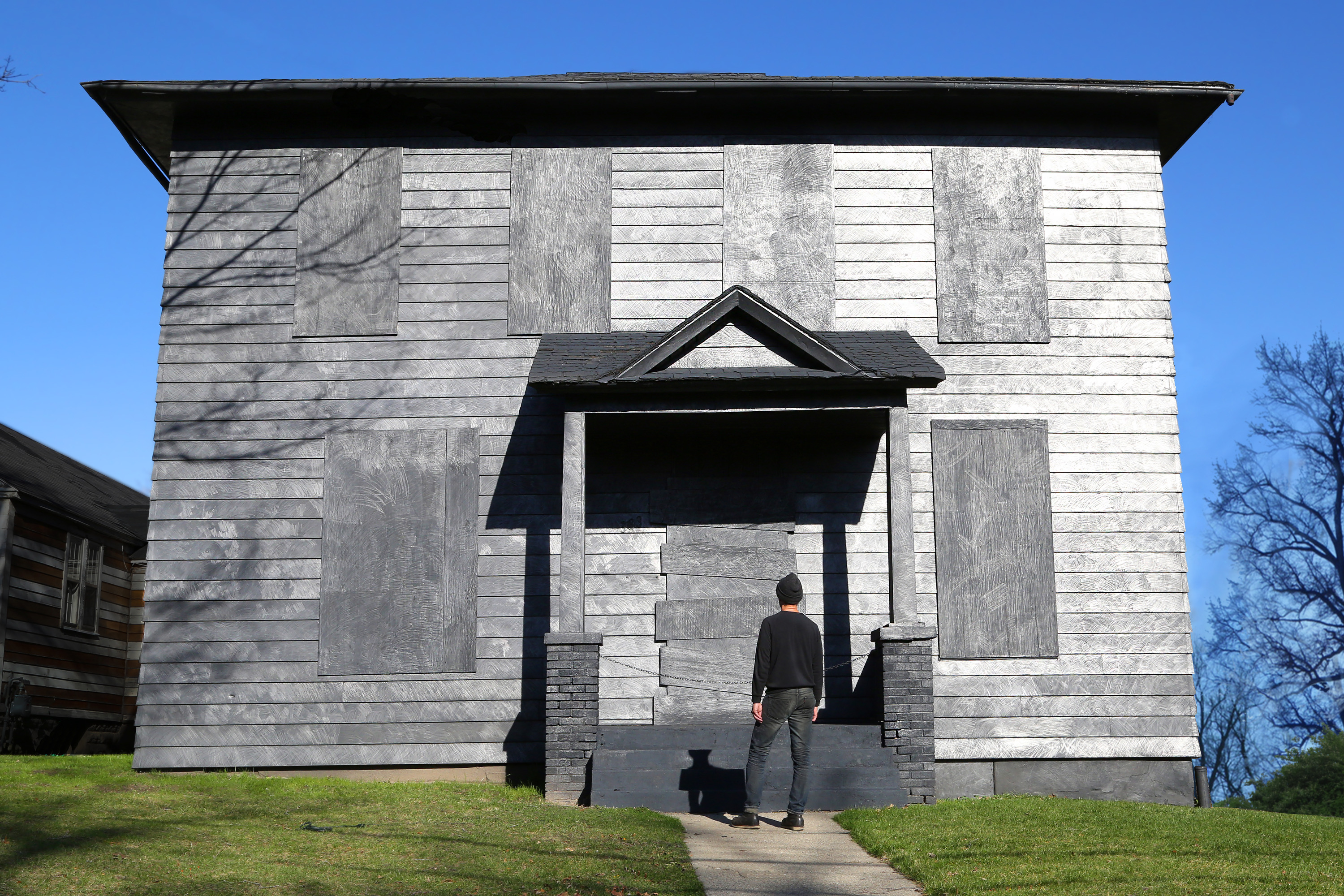
Diana Shpungin's "Drawing Of A House (Triptych)"

Shpungin's work often deals with themes of memory, longing, loss, and empathy. Influenced by artists like Felix Gonzales-Torres, Shpungin uses deeply personal motifs and narratives in her drawings, sculptures, and video works, often combined with found objects to emphasize a concept that she refers to as “object empathy”. In her smaller sculptures and larger installations, Shpungin explores objects and architecture to emphasize contrasting themes such as domestic and communal, light and dark, or interior and exterior.

=== Materiality ===
The use of graphite is a foundational element to Shpungin's work. In addition to drawings and hand-drawn animations, much of her sculptural work involves coating objects and spaces in an all-consuming layer of graphite. Writer Megan Garwood referred to this as “a penumbra, a motif of light and dark”.

== Notable works ==
=== "Drawing Of A House (Triptych)" ===
In 2015, Shpungin partnered with SiTE:LAB for an installation in Grand Rapids Michigan. Shpungin chose an abandoned rectory, slated for redevelopment, and covered it in graphite by hand, employing the help of over one hundred participants. She drew nine hand-drawn animations that were rear-screen projected onto – and out of – the house's windows. The project was both an aesthetic and historical evocation of collective memory. Curator Caryn Coleman wrote:

“Diana Shpungin's Drawing Of A House (Triptych) has re-animated a vacant house into a living space once again. Covering the entire facade in graphite and projecting animations out of the windows, 333 Rumsey Street has become a transformative space that exists within a series of paradoxes: domestic and communal, drawing and sculptural, light and dark, interior and exterior. These opposing characteristics are not an aggressive disjuncture but poetically co-exist. . . Shpungin takes the political and, in this case, spiritual implications associated with 333 Rumsey Street on board to create a multi-media art object that doesn't seal itself off from the audience or acquire an entirely separate existence but, rather, establishes a bonding relationship between viewer and object.”

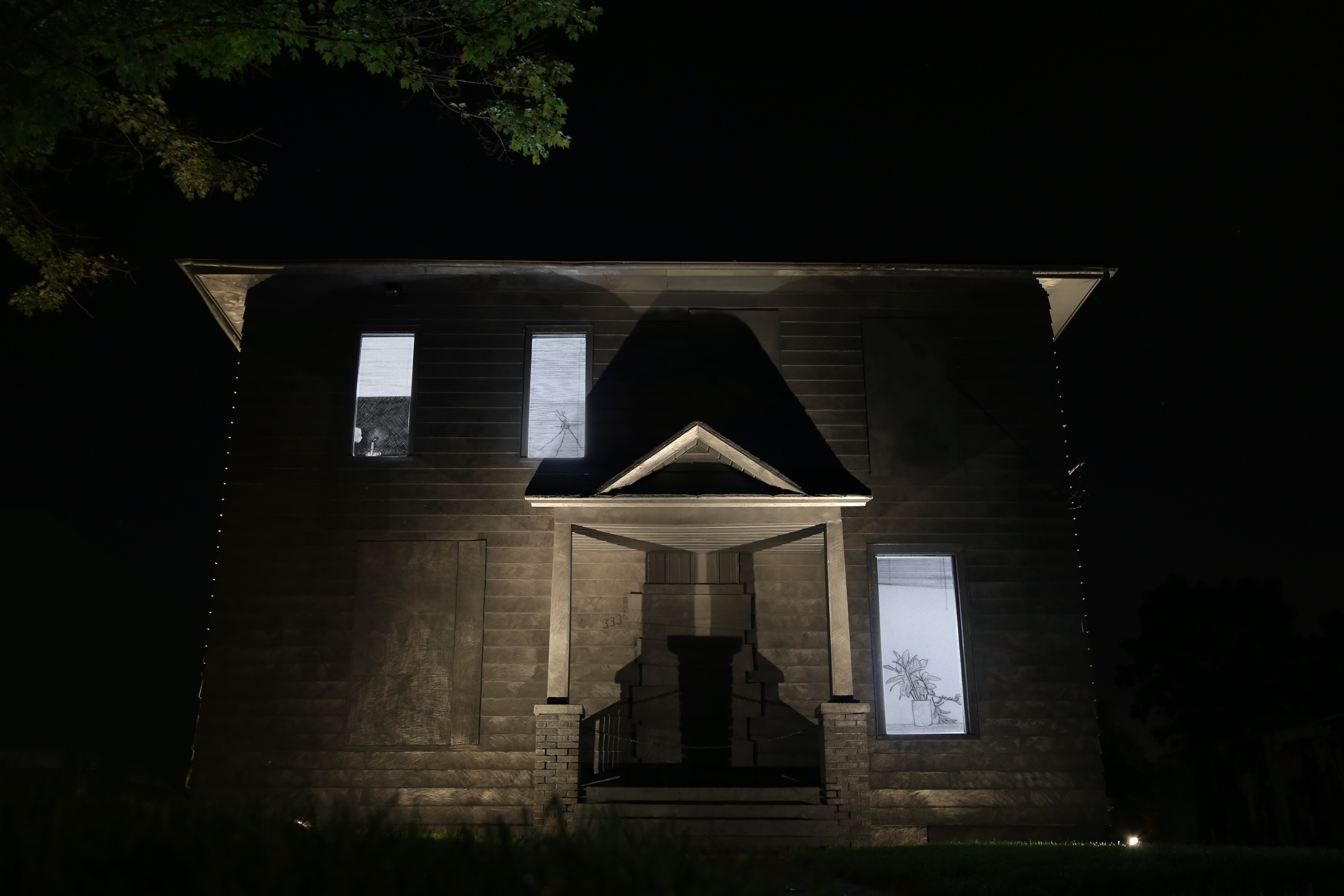
Diana Shpungin's "Drawing Of A House (Triptych)" shown at night

=== "Untitled (Portrait Of Dad)" ===
In 2011 Shpungin showed her first solo work in New York after the end of a nearly decade-long collaboration. The exhibition included over a hundred drawings, hand-drawn animations, and sculptural scenarios including one ton of potatoes for the public to take, a reference to the Félix González-Torres piece from which the show took its name. The exhibition exemplified Shpungin's primary use of graphite through the process of methodically hand-coating objects with the material. Such sculptures include a broken chair in "A Fixed Space Reserved for the Haunting" and a dead citrus sapling – complete with fallen leaves – in "I Especially Love You When You Are Sleeping" (both 2011).

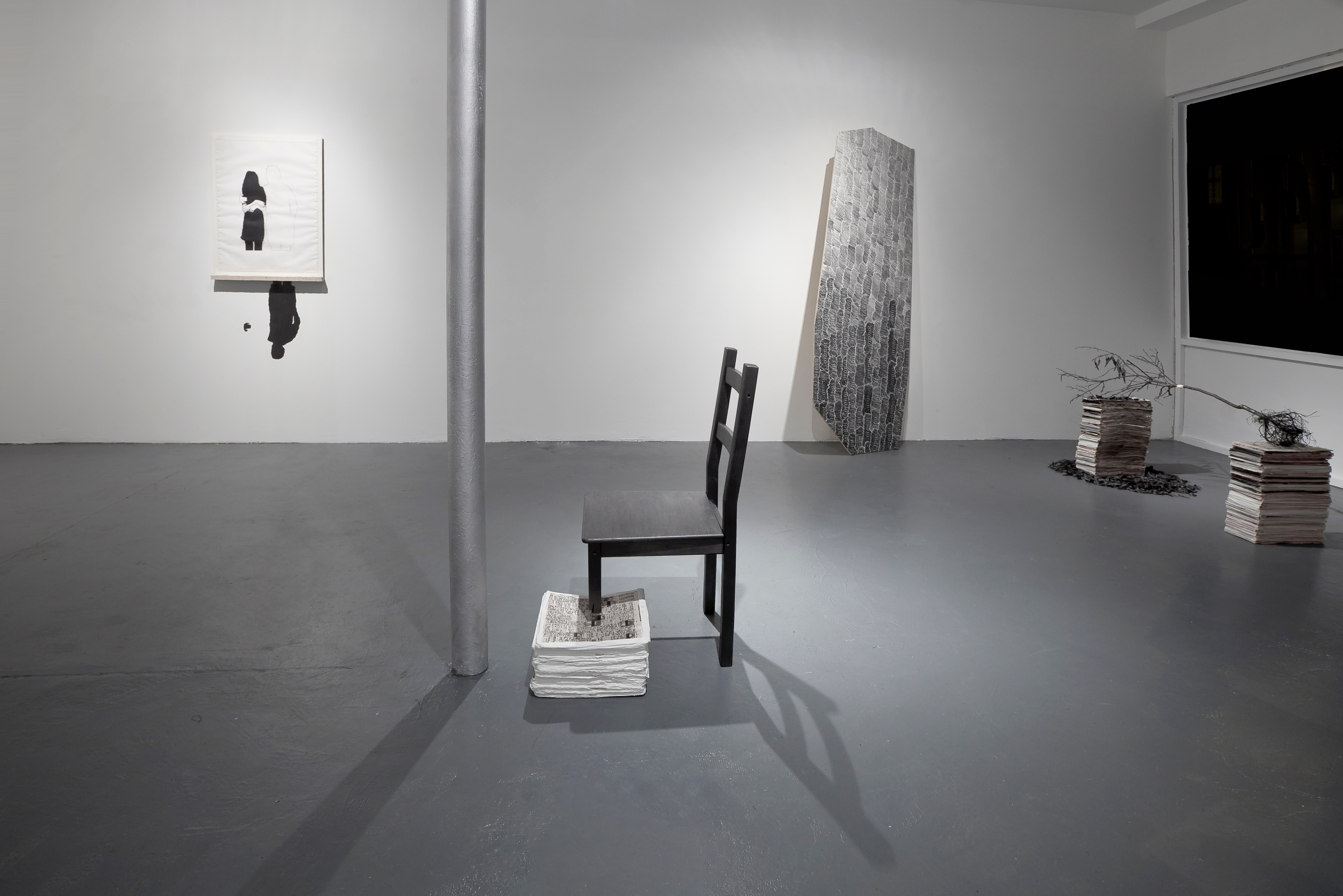
View of "Untitled (Portrait Of Dad)" by Diana Shpungin

Art critic Jerry Saltz said of Shpungin's work in a review in New York Magazine:

“Once upon the millennia, art was used to mourn and also usher the deceased into the afterlife. In “(Untitled) Portrait of Dad” Diana Shpungin delves into the emotions and aesthetics of loss. We see beautiful hand-drawn animations here, one of her father in his casket, another of the world as seen from his grave. A broken chair references an odd family superstition. Nearby, we see a small mountain of spuds for the taking, to be put in bags marked with her father's handwritten potato recipe. It's a moving and poetic experience, and touches on the more mystical things art can still do.”

=== "Bright Light / Darkest Shadow" ===
In early 2020, Shpungin had a solo exhibition at the Museum of Contemporary Art, Tucson titled ‘’Bright Light / Darkest Shadow’’. The show compiled nearly a decade of work, primarily hand-drawn animations. Seventeen animations, as well as source drawings for them, were shown along with animations from ‘’Drawing Of A House (Triptych)’’. Three additional video works were shown in a separate gallery, and two entirely new works were projected onto large sheets of drawing paper. Spanning multiple years, saw Shpungin explore recurring themes in the oeuvre such as memory, family, and loss, as well as showed her continuing exploration of the nature of drawing as a medium.

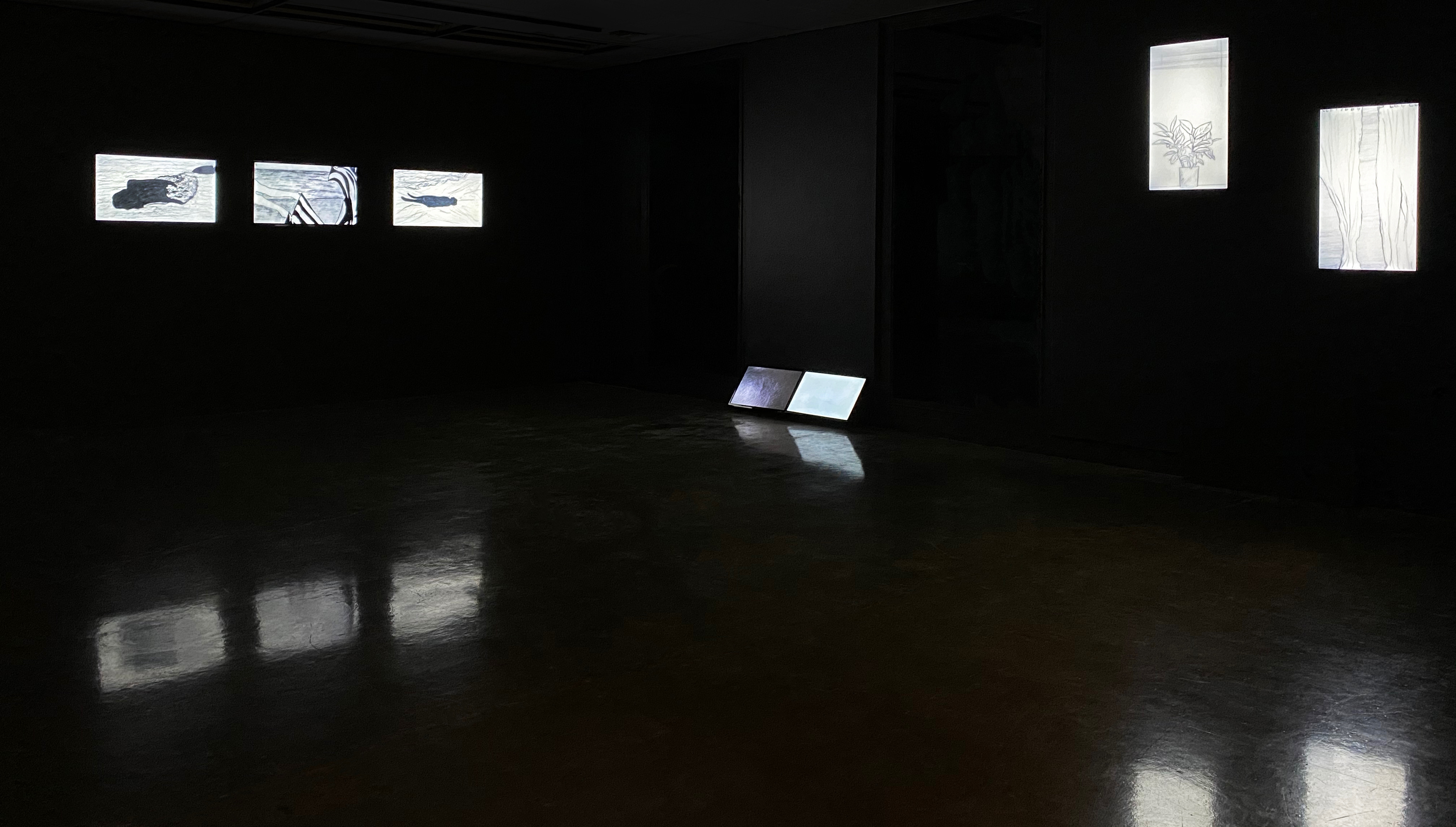
View of Diana Shpungin: "Bright Light / Darkest Shadow" at MoCA Tucson

=== "Drawing For A Reliquary" ===
In 2021 Shpungin collaborated with Paul Amenta of SiTE:LAB on an outdoor sculpture commissioned by Franconia Sculpture Park in Minneapolis, Minnesota. The work, titled Drawing For a Reliquary, is a large-scale mixed-media installation made of various salvaged components and two fabricated steel truss structures, with every surface hand-drawn over with graphite pencil. The surface treatment summoned involvement from dozens of participants, allowing for the communal mark-making to be both a part of the work's present history and as an offering to the past. The adaptive nature of the work reacts specifically to objects/relics found on site in the sculpture park. From the three upright lifeless trees rescued from being burned in a bonfire, to the fallen forty-foot dead tree discovered in the woods, to the monumental forty-foot steel beam buried in a pile of metal at the park. Drawing For A Reliquary is framed by the park's backdrop and offers numerous views lining up the sculpture's sightlines with the distant horizons. The saw cut in the massive laid tree and end of the I-beam are encrusted in silver leaf as a way to elevate them, memorialize them and to denote empathy for one another. The addition of a selection of salvaged boulders act as a defining ritual-like framework and as a place to sit and contemplate.

=== "Always Begin At The End" ===
At the start of 2022 Shpungin had a solo exhibition at Smack Mellon in Brooklyn.

Diana Shpungin's solo exhibition "Always Begin At The End"

The exhibition centered around a marble-tiled arena covering a significant portion of Smack Mellon's 4,000 square foot main gallery floor. The exhibition's title Always Begin At The End, and its acronym ABATE, signal to the way that time can loop, how stories can start in unexpected places, and how a journey's end might be less than its imagined start. A chandelier, a record player, seashells, chairs, chain link fencing, cast body parts, doors, cardboard boxes, a reconfigured American flag, and loose change add to the range of objects that Shpungin installed throughout the space. This exhibition features many objects made from cast paper, alongside combined found objects that the artist alters, construction materials, and a single hand-drawn pencil animation metaphorically smashed by rocks. Much of Shpungin's works can be seen as “drawings” in the sense that they are literally covered in drawing's most ubiquitous medium: graphite pencil. Shpungin painstakingly covers each object but does not obscure it, in a self-reflexive process that results in works which construct, change, and question themselves through the process of their own creation.

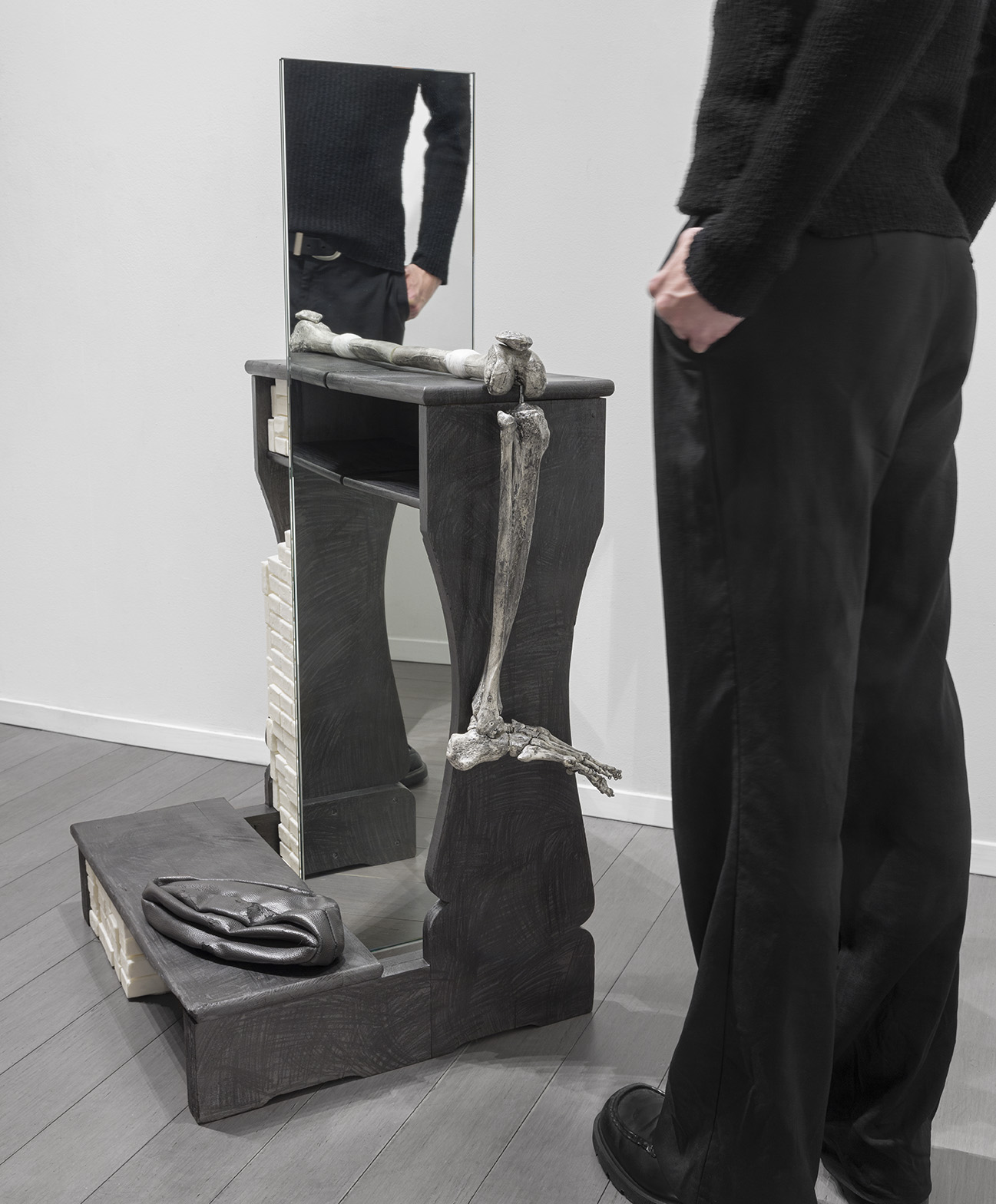
a work from 2022 titled "Pure Clean Power Deflation Rumination"

Upon the exhibition's closing, Diana Shpungin and Smack Mellon published an accompanying catalogue, also titled Always Begin At The End. In addition to documenting the artwork the publication features multiple writings on the content of the show: an introduction by curator Rachel Vera Steinberg, an essay by critic and philosopher Darla Migan, an interview between Shpungin and curator Gabriel de Guzman, and a work of poetry by the artist herself. In Migan's essay, To Make Bare The Shadow: On Diana Shpungin's Always Begin At The End, she writes: "The objects that comprise ABATE performatively rehearse the contradictions between the unstoppable march of time and our capacity to reorient the arrangements of life from whatever remains available for ongoing manipulation. Reeling in or spinning out from various failures of so-called "progress," this teetering between urgent criticism and slowed-down contemplation is felt in Shpungin's buoying acts of repetition." The book was designed by Shpungin and designer Grant Carmichael in a way such that it can be read from front to back or vice versa, keeping true to the theme and title of the show itself.

=== "Day For Night" ===
In conjunction with Always Begin At The End, a performance was held on February 3, 2022. Titled Day For Night, it incorporated a hybrid of experimental dance and ballet, choreographed by Shpungin in collaboration with classically trained ballet dancer Tatiana Nuñez, who performs the piece. An original experimental score by renowned musician Mick Rossi (of the Philip Glass Ensemble) accompanies the performance, into which he incorporated Shpungin's own amateur out-of-tune playing on her childhood piano shipped from Riga, Latvia. Day For Night also features costume design by renowned NYC fashion and costume designer David Quinn, who used the sculptural work from ABATE as inspiration. The title Day For Night, which is also the title of the score, references the eponymous 1973 film by François Truffaut who famously used a filter on the camera lens to turn footage shot during the daytime into night scenes.

Dancer Tati Nuñez performs in Day For Night

== Exhibitions and press ==
Shpungin has exhibited extensively in both national and international venues including: The Bronx Museum of Art in Bronx, New York; SculptureCenter in Long Island City, New York; the Bass Museum of Art in Miami, Florida; Locust Projects in Miami, Florida; Franconia Sculpture Park in Minneapolis, Minnesota; the Futura Center for Contemporary Art in Prague, Czech Republic; Tomio Koyama Gallery in Tokyo, Japan; the Carrousel du Louvre in Paris, France; Invisible-Exports in New York City; Stephan Stoyanov Gallery in New York City; the Marc Straus Gallery in New York City; the Brooklyn Museum of Art in Brooklyn, New York; Site:Lab in Grand Rapids, Michigan; The Aldrich Contemporary Art Museum in Ridgefield, Connecticut, and Smack Mellon in Brooklyn, New York.

Her work has been reviewed in publications such as Artforum, Flash Art, New York Magazine, Art in America, The New York Times, Timeout London, and Le Monde among others. Her work was the subject of an episode of PBS's Art Assignment, “Object Empathy” and was cited in the introduction of Jerry Saltz's book "Seeing Out Louder".

== Accolades ==
Shpungin was awarded the 2019/20 Pollock Krasner Foundation Grant and the 2017 New York Foundation for the Arts Fellowship in Sculpture and has been the recipient of awards, fellowships, and residencies with MacDowell, Art Omi, CEC Artslink, Dieu Donne, The Lower Manhattan Cultural Council, VLA Art and Law, Bronx Museum AIM Program, Guttenberg Arts, Islip Carriage House.
