= Diana Blok =

Uruguay-born Dutch photographer (born 1952)

- Born: 1952 (age 73–74); Montevideo, Uruguay
- Occupation: Photographer
- Website: http://www.dianablok.com/

Diana Blok (born 1952) is a Uruguay-born Dutch photographer.

== Life and work ==
Diana Blok was born in Montevideo, Uruguay. Her father was a Dutch-Jewish diplomat and her mother was a catholic Argentinian woman. She lived with the family in Colombia, Guatemala and Mexico City, where she studied Sociology. She migrated to Amsterdam in 1974. In Amsterdam, she developed herself as a photographer, working as assistant at the studios of fashion photographers Anna Beeke and Billie Glaser. From 1979 to 1981, Blok lived and collaborated with fellow photographer Marlo Broekmans, with whom she would later publish the book Invisible Forces.

Her work is included in the collections of the Stedelijk Museum Amsterdam, the Centre Pompidou, Paris, the Museo Nacional de Bellas Artes, Buenos Aires, and the Museum of Fine Arts Houston.

== Bibliography ==
Publications by Diana Blok:

- See Through Us - Portraits and Stories, author Diana Blok, 2007.
- Time Tells (El Tiempo lo dira), author Diana Blok (Witteveen Visual Art Center, 2012).
- Possible Paradise - A Visit to Surinam - Photography Diana Blok, author Diana Blok
- Invisible Forces, authors Diana Blok and Marlo Broekmans (Bert Bakker)
- Eu Te Desafio a Me Amar, author Diana Blok in collaboration with INESC, UN (Women and Dutch Embassy in Brasília, 2014).
- Details, author Diana Blok
- Blood Ties & Other Bonds, author Diana Blok, introduction by Elena Poniatowska, (Uitgeverij Contact, 1990).
- Ay Dios - Curaçao, Corazon, Curacion, photography Diana Blok, text Jan Brokken (Paradox/ Veenman/ Voetnoot)
- Adventures in Cross-Casting, photography Diana Blok, text Don Bloch
- Living Leaves, author Diana Blok, design Esther Noyons, text Ogutu Muraya (Robstolk, 2024).
