= Diana J. Wilkie =

American nurse researcher

- Born: Colorado, US
- Spouse: Bryan Lynn Cairns (m. 1973)

Academic background
- Education: ADN, University of Hawaiʻi; BSc, nursing, 1982, Mesa College; MSc, PhD, 1990, University of California, San Francisco
- Thesis: Behavioral correlates of lung cancer pain (1990)

Diana Joyce Wilkie is an American nurse researcher. She is the Prairieview Trust-Earl and Margo Powers Endowed Professor at the University of Florida. Wilkie was elected to the National Academy of Medicine in 2012.

== Early life and education ==
Wilkie was born and raised in Colorado to a poor farm family. In 1973, she married Bryan Lynn Cairns whom she met while attending Fruita Monument High School. After completing her Associate Degree in Nursing from the University of Hawaiʻi, Wilkie began working as a nurse at St. Mary's Medical Center. While there, she was encouraged to pursue her bachelor's degree at Mesa College then pursue her master's and doctorate in nursing at the University of California, San Francisco.

== Career ==
After receiving her Ph.D. Wilkie came to the University of Washington in 1990 largely due to the presence of the late Anesthesiology Chair John Bonica. As an associate professor in the University of Washington School of Nursing, she was the inaugural recipient of the National Hospice Foundation Research Award for her "exemplary contributions." Wilkie left University of Washington in 2003 to join the Faculty of Nursing at the University of Illinois at Chicago (UIC).

Upon joining UIC, Wilkie continued her research on end-of-life, palliative care, and informatics research with an emphasis on sickle cell disease and cancer. As the Harriet H. Werley Endowed Chair for Nursing Research, Wilkie also oversaw the establishment of the first National Institutes of Health-funded Center for Excellence for End-of-Life Transition Research. As a result, she was elected to the National Academy of Medicine in 2012.

Wilkie left UIC in 2015 to become the Prairieview Trust-Earl and Margo Powers Endowed Professor at the University of Florida. In this role, she helped establish the Center of Excellence in Palliative Care Research within the College of Nursing and serve as its director. By 2018, she received a grant from the National Cancer Institute to establish a cancer health equity center at UFL and partner institutions. As a result of her work, Wilkie was appointed a University of Florida Research Foundation Professor for 2020.
