= Diana Ibrahim =

Lebanese actress

- ديانا إبراهيم
- Education: Lebanese University
- Occupation: Actress

Diana Ibrahim (Arabic: ديانا إبراهيم) is a Lebanese actress.

== Filmography ==
=== Dubbing roles ===
- La intrusa - Virginia Martínez Roldán de Junquera / Vanessa Martínez Roldán de Islas
- La mujer de Judas - Chichita Agüero del Toro
- Prophet Joseph - Zuleika
