= Diana Aga =

Filipino-American chemist

- Born: Philippines
- Education: B.S. University of the Philippines at Los Baños, Laguna, Philippines (1988) Ph.D. University of Kansas, Lawrence, KS (1995) Postdoctoral fellow Swiss Federal Institute of Environmental Science and Technology (ETH/EAWAG), Zurich, Switzerland, (1996-1998)
- Known for: Environmental analytical chemistry, detecting agricultural & pharmaceutical contaminants in water
- Awards: New York Water Environment Association Kenneth Allen Memorial Award; University at Buffalo Excellence in Graduate Student Mentoring Award
- Scientific career
- Workplaces: University at Buffalo
- Thesis: Analytical applications of immunoassays in environmental and agricultural chemistry : study of the fate and transport of herbicides (1995)
- Website: https://www.buffalo.edu/renew/research/alert--aga-lab-for-environmental-research-and-testing.html

Diana S. Aga is a Filipino-American chemist who is the Henry M. Woodburn Chair in the Chemistry Department at the University at Buffalo. In 2023, she named a SUNY Distinguished Professor. Aga is the director of UB's Research and Education in Energy, Environment and Water (RENEW) Institute. At the University at Buffalo, she named her laboratory in the Chemistry Department at the University - the Aga Laboratory for Environmental Research and Testing (ALERT).

== Education ==
Aga obtained a bachelor's in agricultural chemistry from the University of the Philippines Los Bañosin 1988. She earned a Ph.D from the University of Kansas. For her Ph.D, she researched applications of immunoassays in agricultural chemistry. After graduating, she worked briefly for the United States Geological Survey and then joined ETH Zurich as a postdoctoral scholar for two years.

== Research and career ==
After a brief spell in industry, Aga returned to academia, and was appointed to the faculty at the University at Buffalo in 2002. In 2000, Aga was awarded an National Science Foundation CAREER Award.

Aga does mass spectroscopy analysis to obtain detailed information on chemical composition and information on compounds in materials. She is one of many scientists worldwide who have applied this mass spectroscopy technique to investigate pesticides in crops, contaminants in ground and wastewater, presence of antibiotics in wastewater, chemical compositions of brominated flame retardants(polybrominated diphenyl ethers, BDEs) which are toxic chemicals. Aga has co-authored a paper describing the presence of pharmaceuticals, in particular antidepressants, in Great Lakes fish.

== Awards and honours ==
- 2007 New York Water Environment Association's, Kenneth Allen Memorial Award given annually for papers or presentations describing work of a research or engineering nature including papers with multiple co-authors
- 2013 University at Buffalo Excellence in Graduate Student Mentoring Award given on an annual basis, to a member of the UB Graduate Faculty.
- 2022 American Chemical Society Fellow cited for "Recognized for encouraging women and underrepresented minority students to pursue careers in environmental and agricultural chemistry and for innovative contributions in agrochemical analysis to better understand their ecological and health impacts."
- 2024 Analytical Scientist Power List, Aga is ranked #8 in "Planet Protector" field.

== Selected publications ==
- Batt, Angela L.; Kim, Sungpyo; Aga, Diana S. (2007). "Comparison of the occurrence of antibiotics in four full-scale wastewater treatment plants with varying designs and operations". Chemosphere. 68 (3): 428–435. Bibcode:2007Chmsp..68..428B. doi:10.1016/j.chemosphere.2007.01.008. ISSN 0045-6535. PMID 17316751.
- Farkas, Michael H.; Berry, James O.; Aga, Diana S. (2007-02-01). "Chlortetracycline Detoxification in Maize via Induction of Glutathione S-Transferases after Antibiotic Exposure". Environmental Science & Technology. 41 (4): 1450–1456. Bibcode:2007EnST...41.1450F. doi:10.1021/es061651j. ISSN 0013-936X. PMID 17593756.
- Kim, Sungpyo; Aga, Diana S. (2007-11-23). "Potential Ecological and Human Health Impacts of Antibiotics and Antibiotic-Resistant Bacteria from Wastewater Treatment Plants". Journal of Toxicology and Environmental Health, Part B. 10 (8): 559–573. Bibcode:2007JTEHB..10..559K. doi:10.1080/15287390600975137. ISSN 1093-7404. PMID 18049923. S2CID 25658112.
- Arnnok, Prapha; Singh, Randolph R.; Burakham, Rodjana; Perez-Fuentetaja, Alicia; Aga, Diana S. (2017) "Selective Uptake and Bioaccumulation of Antidepressants in Fish from Effluent-Impacted Niagara River" Environ. Sci Technol. 10652-10662
- Aga, Diana S. (2019). Fate of pharmaceuticals in the environment and in water treatment systems. CRC Press. ISBN 978-0-367-38787-7. OCLC 1105948889.
