= Diana Thorne =

American artist

- Born: 1895; Winnipeg, Manitoba or Odesa, Ukraine
- Died: 1965 (aged 69–70)

Diana Thorne (1895–1963) was an American artist and illustrator known for her drawings of dogs.

== Early life and education ==
While Thorne is believed to have been born in Odesa, Ukraine, she often stated that she had been born in Winnipeg, Manitoba to parents who were Canadian ranchers. She studied at the Technische Hochschulen in Munich (now the Technical University of Munich) and in Charlottenburg (now Technische Universität Berlin).

== Career ==
Her work is included in the collections of the Smithsonian American Art Museum, the American Museum and Gardens, Bath, England, and the McNay Art Museum. The Ingalls Library and Museum Archives at the Cleveland Museum of Art holds an artist file of Thorne's work.

== Selected Books ==
- Diana Thorne's Dog-Basket, A Series of Etchings (1930)
- Your Dogs and Mine (1932)
- ABC of Dogs (1938)
- Around the World with Children and Dogs (1940)
- Drawing Dogs (1940)
- Dogs: An Album of Drawings (1944)
- Cats and More Cats (1945)
- Cats, in Prose and Verse (1947)
- How to Draw the Dog: A Technical Treatise (1950)
