= Diana Moukalled =

Lebanese journalist

Diana Moukalled is a Lebanese journalist and documentary producer/director. She covers hot zones in the Middle East, including wars in Lebanon, Afghanistan (2001), Iraq (2003), and Yemen (2015). Her documentaries cover social issues, including those relating to women and minorities.

Moukalled started her career in 1993 as a general news reporter at Future TV covering news, political and social issues. In 1999, she started working on documentary series, Bil Ain Almujaradah, that covered political issues in conflict zones.

In 2010, Moukalled became head of Future TV website and social media pages.

In 2017, she co-founded Daraj Media, an independent media platform with the goal of covering controversial or underreported stories. Daraj was the only Arab media platform to be part of Paradise Papers by ICIJ. Moukalled has also been regular contributor to several Lebanese and pan-Arab publications.
