= Octavia Zollicoffer Bond =

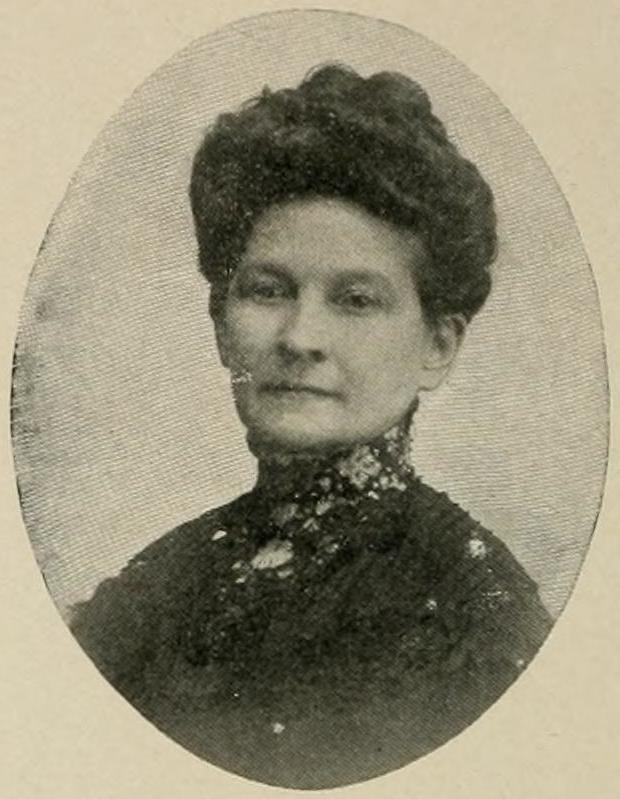
- Born: April 18, 1846; Hickman County
- Died: October 2, 1941 (aged 95); Nashville
- Resting place: Nashville City Cemetery
- Occupation: Writer
- Parent(s): Felix Zollicoffer; Louisa Pocahontas Zollicoffer

Octavia Zollicoffer Bond (April 18, 1846 – October 2, 1941) was an American writer, Tennessee folklorist, and genealogist.

Octavia Zollicoffer Bond was born on April 18, 1846 in Gordon's Ferry, Hickman County, Tennessee, the daughter of Confederate General Felix Kirk Zollicoffer and Louisa Pocahontas Gordon Zollicoffer, daughter of Captain John Gordon. She married John Brien Bond.

She served as editor of Southern Women's Magazine from 1913 to 1916. Her short stories include "The Rule that Worked Both Ways," published in the December 1904 issue of The Black Cat, featuring a scientist who invents a ray that makes ghosts visible and turns people into helium.

Bond died on 2 October 1941 in Nashville.

== Bibliography ==
- Old Tales Retold: Or Perils and Adventures of Tennessee Pioneers. Nashville: Smith & Lamar, Publishing House of the Methodist Episcopal Church, 1914.
- The family chronicle and kinship book of Maclin, Clack, Cocke, Carter, Taylor, Cross, Gordon, and other related American lineages. Nashville: McDaniel Printing Co., 1928.
