= Diana Sierra =

Colombian businessperson and industrial designer

- Education: Columbia University (MS); Universidad de Los Andes (BA)
- Years active: 2012–present
- Title: CEO of Be Girl

Diana Sierra is a Colombian social entrepreneur and industrial designer. She is the co-founder and chief executive officer of Be Girl, a menstrual product design company.

== Biography ==
Sierra graduated with a Master of Science degree in sustainability management from Columbia University and a Bachelor of Arts in industrial design from the Universidad de Los Andes.

She has worked as a consultant for different multinational companies and firms. She has helped design new cooking stoves, agro-processing machines and soil testing devices in South America and East Africa.

In 2020, she joined the Women in the Sanitation Economy Innovation Lab.
