= Diana Coben =

Adult education academic

- Education: University of Kent at Canterbury
- Scientific career
- Thesis: Radical heroes : Gramsci, Freire and the Liberal tradition in adult education (1992)
- Website: www.literacyandnumeracyforadults.com

Diana Coben is an adult education academic, and visiting professor of the University of East Anglia. Between 2011 and 2018 she was Director of New Zealand's National Centre of Literacy and Numeracy for Adults and full professor at University of Waikato.

== Academic career ==
Coben's PhD at the University of Kent at Canterbury (now the University of Kent) was 'Radical heroes: Gramsci, Freire and the Liberal tradition in adult education' studying the critical pedagogy of Paulo Freire and the counterhegemony of Antonio Gramsci.

Coben is being involved many groups and advisory boards related to adult education, including the Irish National Centre for Excellence in Mathematics and Science Teaching and Learning, UK National Research and Development Centre for Adult Literacy and Numeracy and Adults Learning Mathematics. She is a Fellow of the Higher Education Academy, a Fellow of the Royal Society for the Encouragement of Arts, Manufactures and Commerce and an emeritus professor at King's College London

== Selected works ==
- Coben, Diana. Radical Heroes: Gramsci, Freire and the Politics of Adult Education. Routledge, 2013.
- Coben, Diana. "Adult numeracy: review of research and related literature: November 2003." (2003).
- Coben, Diana. "Mathematics or common sense? Researching 'invisible' mathematics through adults' mathematics life histories." In Perspectives on adults learning mathematics, pp. 53–66. Springer Netherlands, 2000.
- Coben, Diana. "Numeracy, mathematics and adult learning." Adult numeracy development: Theory, research, practice (2000): 33–50.
- Coben, Diana. "Revisiting Gramsci." Studies in the Education of Adults 27, no. 1 (1995): 36–51.
- Coben, Diana. "Metaphors for an educative politics: "common sense," "good sense," and educating adults". Gramsci and education (2002): 275–304.
