= Diana Weynand =

== Overview ==
Diana Weynand is a producer, director, editor, and the co-founder of Weynand Training International which is an Apple Authorized Training Center and one of the Apple Certification Programs in southern California. She's authored 13 books in seven languages and several of Apple's Pro Training editions. She has taken Final Cut Pro and various other software classes across the country to places that have never had access to Apple's authorized quality training. Diana began her higher education at the University of Texas in Austin, earning a bachelor's degree in music before moving to Columbia, South Carolina in 1976 for a master's degree in music at the University of South Carolina. She later earned a second master's degree in media arts at the University of South Carolina.

== Work in film ==
Early in her career, after interning at South Carolina Educational Television, she worked as a director/producer for the award-winning PBS series, Cinematic Eye, and then moved to ABC in New York where she was an online post production editor, working on 20/20, soap operas, and Olympic specials. She moved to Los Angeles to become Barbara Walter's Supervising Editor on her entertainment specials. Diana has produced and directed documentaries, including “Endangered Species: The Cable Cars of San Francisco.” Together with partners Shirley Craig and Tina Valinsky, she developed reality television programming through their production company, Dockside Productions.

== Weynand Training International ==
WTI was started in 1984 by Diana and her partner Shirley Craig. The group was established to provide training and consulting for film companies, networks and broadcast stations, production and post-production companies, local unions, and industry manufacturing companies. The list of companies that have utilized Weynand Training's support range from the ABC TV Network to the LA Unified School District. Television shows like “Sixty Minutes,” “The David Letterman Show,” and “The Tonight Show” have all updated and trained their staff with Weynand's support. Other customized on-site training course topics range from non-linear editing to automated master control operations, stereo audio to robotic cameras, and 2D and 3D software programs to DVD Authoring and NT Tech Support. In 2006, Weynand traveled throughout the country offering intensive seminars on Final Cut Pro and Final Cut Studio to filmmakers eager to learn more about their craft.

In the fall of 2009 Weynand Training began to launch a series of iPhone apps called iKeysToGo. The mobile phone applications offer keyboard shortcuts for various photo and film editing software. The first to launch was iKeysToGo: Final Cut Pro 7 covering 840 keyboard shortcuts for the new Final Cut Pro release. The next releases included Adobe Photoshop CS4, IPhoto and Microsoft Word applications.

== Authored by Diana Weynand ==
Diana is the author of five best selling editing books on Final Cut Pro, as well as co-author of “The Secrets of Vlogging” and “How Video Works.” Her editing curriculum is highly recommended for anyone looking to become an Apple certified editors. She also writes on High Definition production. Diana is working on a new book and companion website called “Lipstick Football.”

Diana's Apple Pro Training Series is published by Peachpit press. These books are used as the primary curricula for all the Apple Authorized Training Centers worldwide and include:

- FINAL CUT PRO 4 (in seven languages)
- FINAL CUT PRO HD (in five languages)
- FINAL CUT PRO 5 (in seven languages)
- FINAL CUT PRO 6 (in seven languages)
- FINAL CUT PRO 7 (in seven languages)
- FINAL CUT PRO X
- FINAL CUT PRO FOR AVID EDITORS (versions 1–4)
- FINAL CUT EXPRESS (versions 1–4)
- THE SECRETS OF VIDEO BLOGGING
- HOW VIDEO WORKS
- THE POST PRODUCTION PROCESS, author
- VIDEO: THEORY & OPERATIONS, editor
- AVID SURVIVAL GUIDE, author
- PHOTOSHOP 6.0 SURVIVAL GUIDE, author

Below the Line Magazine Contributing Columnist:

- HD ON THE RISE / monthly column on HD
