= Diana Encinas =

Mexican figure skater (born 1968)

Personal information
- Nationality: Mexican
- Born: 2 April 1968 (age 56)

Sport
- Sport: Figure skating

Diana Encinas (born 2 April 1968) is a Mexican figure skater. She competed in the ladies' singles event at the 1988 Winter Olympics.
