= Diana Huffaker =

American physicist

- Education: The University of Texas at Austin - PhD in Electrical Engineering The University of Texas at Austin - Masters in Materials sciences University of Arizona - Bachelors in Engineering Physics
- Awards: The Optical Society, Fellow[8] SPIE, Nanoengineering Pioneer Award Creative Awards, Most Valuable Patent DoD, National Security Science and Engineering Faculty Fellow (NSSEFF) IEEE, Fellow Alexander Von Humboldt Fellowship
- Scientific career
- Fields: epitaxy, optoelectronic devices, plasmonics, Quantum dot and nanostructured
- Workplaces: Current: University of Texas, Austin Former: Cardiff University University of California, Los Angeles

Diana Huffaker is an American physicist working in compound semiconductors optical devices. She is the current Electrical Engineering Department Chair at the University of Texas at Arlington. Previously, she served as the Sêr Cymru Chair in Advanced Engineering and Materials and as Science Director of the Institute of Compound Semiconductors at Cardiff University. Her work includes compound semiconductor epitaxy, lasers, solar cells, optoelectronic devices, plasmonics, and Quantum dot and nanostructured materials.

== Research and career ==
Prior to moving to Cardiff University in 2015, Huffaker was Professor in Electrical Engineering and Director of the Integrated Nanomaterials Laboratory at the University of California, Los Angeles (UCLA).

=== Highly cited papers ===
- Huffaker, D. L., Deppe, D. G., Kumar, K., & Rogers, T. J. (1994). Native-oxide defined ring contact for low threshold vertical-cavity lasers. Applied Physics Letters, 65(1), 97–99. doi:10.1063/1.113087
- Huffaker, D. L., & Deppe, D. G. (1998). Electroluminescence efficiency of 1.3 μm wavelength InGaAs/GaAs quantum dots. Applied Physics Letters, 73(4), 520–522. doi:10.1063/1.121920
- Huffaker, D. L., Park, G., Zou, Z., Shchekin, O. B., & Deppe, D. G. (1998). 1.3 μm room-temperature GaAs-based quantum-dot laser. Applied Physics Letters, 73(18), 2564–2566. doi:10.1063/1.122534
- Gyoungwon Park, Shchekin, O. B., Huffaker, D. L., & Deppe, D. G. (2000). Low-threshold oxide-confined 1.3-μm quantum-dot laser. IEEE Photonics Technology Letters, 12(3), 230–232. doi:10.1109/68.826897
- Huang, S. H., Balakrishnan, G., Khoshakhlagh, A., Jallipalli, A., Dawson, L. R., & Huffaker, D. L. (2006). Strain relief by periodic misfit arrays for low defect density GaSb on GaAs. Applied Physics Letters, 88(13), 131911. doi:10.1063/1.2172742
- Laghumavarapu, R. B., Moscho, A., Khoshakhlagh, A., El-Emawy, M., Lester, L. F., & Huffaker, D. L. (2007). GaSb/GaAs type II quantum dot solar cells for enhanced infrared spectral response. Applied Physics Letters, 90(17), 173125. doi:10.1063/1.2734492

== Awards and honours ==
- The Optical Society, Fellow, 2014
- SPIE, Nanoengineering Pioneer Award, 2010
- Creative Awards, Most Valuable Patent, 2009
- DoD, National Security Science and Engineering Faculty Fellow (NSSEFF), 2008
- IEEE, Fellow, 2008
- Alexander Von Humboldt Fellowship, 2004
