= Diana Mordasini =

Senegalese writer and journalist

- Citizenship: Senegalese
- Occupations: Writer, Journalist
- Employer: Milan-based publishing house

Diana Mordasini is a writer and journalist born in Saint-Louis, Senegal. She studied classical literature at the Sorbonne and worked for a time in the fashion industry. She later became a columnist for a Milan-based publishing house. She has lived in Switzerland for over 20 years.

== Bibliography ==
- Le Bottillon perdu [The lost ankle boot] . Dakar: Les Nouvelles Editions Africaines du Sénégal, 1990. (101p.). ISBN 2-7236-0437-3. Novel.
- La cage aux déesses volume 1 : De fil en meurtres Paris: Société des écrivains, 2002 (440p.). ISBN 2-7480-0289-X. Novel.
- La cage aux déesses volume 2 Les yeux d'Ilh'a Paris: Société des écrivains, 2002 (510p.). ISBN 2-7480-0290-3. Novel.
