= Diana K. Rowland =

American author and skydiver

Diana K. Rowland is an author, cross-cultural training pioneer, and professional skydiver.

== Biography ==
=== Early travel ===
Diana K. Rowland started her cross-cultural learning by leaving the United States at the age of 17 in 1968, flying to Luxembourg by an Icelandic Airlines turboprop plane. She traveled throughout Europe and North Africa for a year then took a 53-day overland bus from Europe to India in 1969 (later referred to as The Overland or hippie trail). She lived in India for two years before taking an East Germany freighter to Japan. Living in Kyoto, Japan for the next seven years she applied herself to becoming fluent in speaking and reading standard Japanese, as well as in Kyoto and Kansai dialects.

=== Skydiving ===
Rowland began skydiving in Japan in 1976, and has written a Kindle book about that experience. After returning to the U.S. she made 1,200 jumps, organized many world-record skydives including the largest formation at night, professionally taught advanced free fall skills, and organized commercial jumps for advertisements.

Some of her skydiving experiences in Japan and the U.S. have been documented in More Skydivers' Stories: Close Calls & Epic Feats Above Planet Earth.

=== Business life ===
In Japan, Rowland taught Japanese businessmen and worked for a Japanese trading company in the U.S. after her return. Experiencing the conflict between the U.S. business style and the Japanese, led her to write the bestseller, Japanese Business Etiquette: A Practical Guide to Success with the Japanese (Warner Books, 1985, 1993), which sold 100,000 copies and was translated into five languages.

In 1985 she founded the oldest still-existing cross-cultural training firm Rowland & Associates Inc, now IntXel, Inc. Rowland sits on the Board of Directors for the Japan Society of San Diego & Tijuana and was also on the faculty of the University of Southern California's Marshall School of Business’ Executive Programs for 11 years.

== Writing ==
=== Books ===
- Japanese Business Etiquette: A Practical Guide to success with the Japanese
  - German
  - Dutch
  - Swedish
  - British English
  - Japanese
- International Excellence: Seven Critical Strategies for Personal and Professional Success

=== Kindle books ===
- Japanese Business: Rules of Engagement (Amazon.com: Japanese Business: Rules of Engagement eBook: Diana Kathleen Rowland: Kindle Store)
- Japanese Business Communication: Lost in Translation? (Amazon.com: Japanese Business Communication: Lost in Translation? eBook: Diana K. Rowland: Kindle Store)
- Global Competence: A White Paper (Amazon.com: Global Competence: A White Paper eBook: Diana K. Rowland: Kindle Store)
- BANZAI!: Japanese Business Lessons from a Skydiver (Amazon.com: BANZAI!: Japanese Business Lessons from a Skydiver eBook: Diana K. Rowland: Kindle Store)
- Japanese Subsidiaries in Mexico (Amazon.com: Japanese Subsidiaries in Mexico: A Cross-Cultural Audit eBook: Diana K. Rowland: Kindle Store)
