= Diana Jue =

American female activist

Diana Jue-Rajasingh
- Born: USA
- Education: University of Michigan
- Notable work: Promoter of Essmart

Diana Jue-Rajasingh (born Diana Jue) is an American female activist who is promoting life-improving technologies in South India. She has established the Essmart network in association with Jackie Stenson, whom she met while at MIT, to disseminate technology innovations which are largely unknown in the rural areas of India and China. Through this network of community initiatives she and her friend created distribution channels. In 2015, Forbes named Jue-Rajasingh as "one of Forbes' 30 under 30." In 2016, Jue-Rajasingh entered the Strategy doctoral program at the University of Michigan Ross School of Business.

== Biography ==
Jue-Rajasingh initial years were spent in Los Angeles. She did her under graduation and graduation studies at the Massachusetts Institute of Technology with a master's degree in Urban Studies and Planning with specific thesis research work in rural South India. This was done before she worked for Essmart.

After her college studies she toured South Asia and China. This made her realise that most people of rural areas with low income did not use any innovative technologies in their daily life. She and her friend Jackie Stenson who had made a similar tour of Sub-Saharan Africa same to the same conclusion that social-impact technology should be made available to the rural poor. This prompted them to establish, in 2012, the "Essmart Global, ‘a world distribution company for a catalogue of life-improving goods"

Initially shop-owners in South India were skeptical about the products Jue-Rajasingh and her partner wanted to market through their outlets. They convinced them by arguing that no Chinese manufacturer had approached them to sell their product. Essmart now operates from Bangalore and in Tamil Nadu and Karnataka village shops sell Essmart's products in India, which were unknown to the rural people. Some of the products marketed by Essmart art are solar lantern, water filters, rechargeable batteries, cooking stove to minimize smoke, and use of fuel.

Her articles have been featured on blogs of USAID's Frontiers in Development, MIT Entrepreneurship Review, and Stanford Social Innovation Review.

== Awards ==
Jue-Rajasingh is recipient of many awards notable of which are the Fulbright-Nehru Research Fellowship and several awards by MIT to promote her research and Essmart. In 2014 she was awarded the Cartier Women's Initiative for the Asia-Pacific region.
