= Diana Nekoye Sifuna =

Kenyan model and public policy CEO (born 1987)

- Born: 1987 (age 38–39); Kenya
- Citizenship: Kenya
- Education: Kenyatta University (BA); Strathmore University (MA); Chartered Institute of Marketing (Certificate); New York University (Certificate)
- Occupation: Corporate Executive
- Years active: 2017 — present
- Known for: Public Policy, Governance, Advocacy, Diversity
- Title: CEO at Jonathan Jackson Foundation
- Website: simbaress.com

Diana Nekoye Sifuna is a former Kenyan model now turned a public policy and governance champion currently serving as the chief executive officer (CEO) and board secretary at the Jonathan Jackson Foundation.

Diana served in the same capacities at The Youth Agenda and holds several other portfolios including being a director of Uamuzi App, a tool that narrows the gap on leaders and their constituents, and a career advisor at Prosper App, a development Service for Professionals.

She is a board member of Centre for African Affairs and Conflict Research (CAACOR), and is a founder and director of diversity with Diana Podcast, a discussion platform that zeroes in on diversity, governance and innovations in technology, as well as founder and creative director at Simbaress Fashions.

== Early life and education ==
Diana studied at Lugulu Girls then proceeded to Kenyatta University, where she attained a Bachelor of Commerce degree (business administration, marketing). She holds an MBA in public policy and management from Strathmore University.

She holds a certificate in project management from the Project Institute (via Computer Pride), a diploma in marketing communication from Chartered Institute of Marketing and a certificate in global leaders from the New York University.

== Career ==
Diana was an active model and Actress between 2009 and 2013, fashion designer, media producer, mentor and marketeer who now concentrates on public policy and governance.

After modeling and acting, she moved to the Media industry to act as the Africa producer for Australian Broadcasting Corporation for five months from April 2013 before moving to Vivid Features as the general manager and production manager in Nairobi and Lagos for 27 months from August 2013.

From Media she switched to Marketing and for three years, from November 2015, she served as the marketing and public relations manager, then as head of marketing and public relations at Lordship Africa, a firm that concentrates on real estate.

For 18 months, from August 2018, Diana joined the C-suite boat by assuming the role of chief executive officer at The Youth Agenda, then at the Jonathan Jackson Foundation.

== External ==
- Diana Nekoye Sifuna at Yellow Place
- Diana Sifuna at Africa Gender Equality Conference
- Diversity With Diana Podcast
