= Diana Dowek =

Argentine visual artist

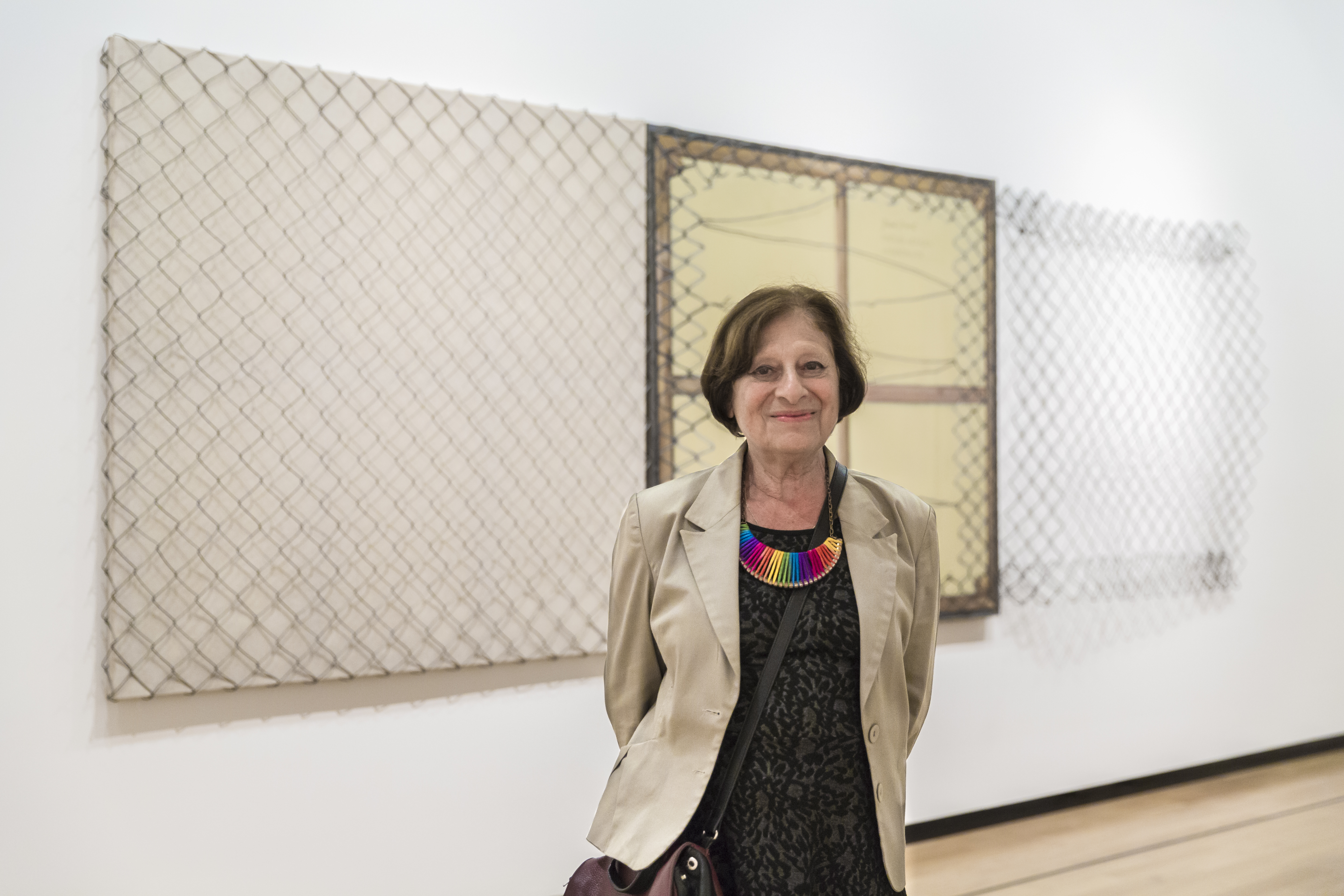
- Born: January 1, 1942 (age 84); Buenos Aires, Argentina
- Education: Escuela Nacional de Bellas Artes Prilidiano Pueyrredón
- Occupation: Visual artist

Diana Dowek (born January 1, 1942) is an Argentine visual artist, known for one of her first series, denoting her engagement in human rights movements. Dowek also was a founder of the Association of Visual Artists of the Argentine Republic (AVARA) and is now a Vice President.

== Biography ==
Diana Dowek was born in Buenos Aires, Argentina on January 1, 1942. She has been labeled a Postwar and Contemporary Artist. It is worth mentioning that in 1975, Dowek experienced a huge change in her life; the coup that overturned the Argentine President. Some sources do, however, note that this event as well as the Vietnam war is what led Diana Dowek to her activist movements, seeing as she experienced so much terrorism.

In 1964, Diana Dowek would settle down and marry her husband before moving to Italy. While they did enjoy the life they lived out in the country, it only took a year before they felt homesick, thus packing up once again and returning to Argentina. From that point on, they have stayed in Argentina ever since.

Diana Dowek would go through some turning point events, such as a coup d'état that was planned in order to overthrow the President Isabel Perón, leaving the government to be led by a military junta. Due to this horrific event, Argentina would mark this time period as "Argentina's Dirty War"; a period that included terrorism and socialistic riots. This event could be compared to the predecessor, French Reign of Terror period, since similar in some events. This "Dirty War" had ended with 30,000 people disappearing by the year 1983.

== Education ==
Sources indicate that Diana Dowek first entered Escuela de Bellas Artes Manuel Belgrano in Buenos Aires (roughly translated to the Manuel Belgrano School of Fine Arts) aged 13, before she later enrolled in a similar school, Escuela Nacional de Bellas Artes Prilidiano Pueyrredón (National Fine Arts). Both schools were within her general vicinity of Buenos Aires. While in attendance at Escuela Nacional de Bellas Artes Prilidiano Pueyrredón, Dowek demanded educational reform alongside other members of the student movement, protesting the active militance opposition that so many of her colleagues were up against. During these years, she would make connections and build what could be described as friendships with other important figures, such as Horacion Safons and Margarita Paska, eventually forming an "active cohort among Buenos Aires' artistic avant-gardes" in other words, they would form a power group.

== Activism ==
During her time in school, Diana Dowek's early work all portrayed her political stance, and most importantly her attempts at raising awareness of social issues and struggles during President Isabel Perón's reign. Dowek was known to have a unique style that led to a number of metaphors being iterated, resulting in over fifty paintings that would document urban uprisings. One of the most known paintings that conveyed these terroristic events would be Paisaje con retrovisor II.

Dowek was engaged in a Post-War movement, promoting human rights and raising awareness. It is known that Ford Falcon cars became a common subject in her painting due to the disappearance of persons in 1983, owed to police often abducting people with unlicensed Falcons.

== Selected artwork ==
=== Paisaje con retrovisor II, 1975 ===
Also known as (Landscape with side view mirror II), this painting is part of a miniseries that became an addition to the Collection of Dr. José Abadi. In an LA Times article, this piece was denoted as one of the most startling works in the exhibit, which can be owed to the still bodies in the car's rearview mirror. The world within this painting seems to be dystopic, and with further investigation, it is revealed that this painting was owed to the coup d'état that had earlier changed the life of Dowek.

== Exhibitions ==
- 1968 Galeria Lirolay, Bueno Aires
- 1985 Pintado en Argentina, Museo Eduardo Sivori, Centro Cultural de Buenos Aires
- 1996 Zana Catástrofe: El poder vulnerable, Fundación Federico Klemm, Buenos Aires
- 2001 Diana Dowek: Exposición retrospectiva, 1972, Museo Nacional de Bellas Artes, Buenos Aires
- 2003 Ansia y Devoción. Imágenes del Presente, Fundación PROA, Buenos Aires
- 2006 Memoria en Construccion, Centro Cultural Recoleta, Buenos Aires
- 2013 La pictura es un campo de batalia, Museo Nacional de Bellas Artes, Neuquén, Argentina
- 2015 Galeria Jacques Martínez, Buenos Aires, Argentina
- 2018 Radical Women Latin American Art, 1960–1985, Brooklyn-New York, New York Brooklyn Museum

== Collections ==
- Pausa, 2003. Mixed Media.
- Pausa En La Larga Marcha, 2003.
- From the Depth of the Earth

== Honors and awards ==
- 2012 Merit Diploma Konex Award for his work in the last decade
- 2011 First prize of painting Central Bank of the Argentine Republic Museum Numismatic BsAs receives the grant Pollock - Krasner Foundation for the edition of a book about his work
- 2010 Margarita Ponce UMA Award for contribution of gender to fine arts
- 2008-09 First Municipal Prize for painting Manuel Belgrano Museum E. Sivori
- 2008 Third prize in painting Banco Nación Centro Cultural Borges Bs. As.
- 2005 First prize Ibero-American painting, Centro Cultural Borges, Buenos Aires
- 2004 Second prize of painting Salon Manuel Belgrano, Museum Sivori Buenos Aires
- 2003 Prize second prize, Ibero-American competition, Museo Nacional de Bellas Artes, Buenos Aires
- 2002 premio Leonardo the artist of the year National Museum of fine arts
- 1999 scholarship to creation, National Endowment for the arts,
- 1997 first prize painting ProArte Museo Provincial de Bellas Artes, Córdoba
- 1995 grant Pollock-Krasner Foundation, New York, USA

Award to the artist of the year 1994, given by the International Association of critics of art, Argentine section

- 1979 special mention of drawing, Premi de Dibuix Joan Miró Barcelona Spain

== Bibliography ==
- https://asuntoimpreso.com/asuntoimpresoediciones/noticias/diana-dowek-la-pintura-es-un-campo-de-batalla-114
- https://hammer.ucla.edu/radical-women/artists/diana-dowek/
- https://art-list.online/diana-dowek/
- https://www.mutualart.com/Exhibition/Radical-Women-Latin-American-Art--1960-1/051FEBB34A3FC96D
- Diana Dowek: La pictura es un campo de batalia; Obras, intervenciones, 1967-2012. Buenos Aires: Asunto Impreso, 2013.
- https://www.pkf-imagecollection.org/artist/Diana_Dowek/works/
- http://www.telam.com.ar/notas/201706/192466-la-artista-diana-dowek-exhibe-pinturas-inspiradas-en-el-conflicto-sirio.html
