= Diana Wind =

Dutch art historian

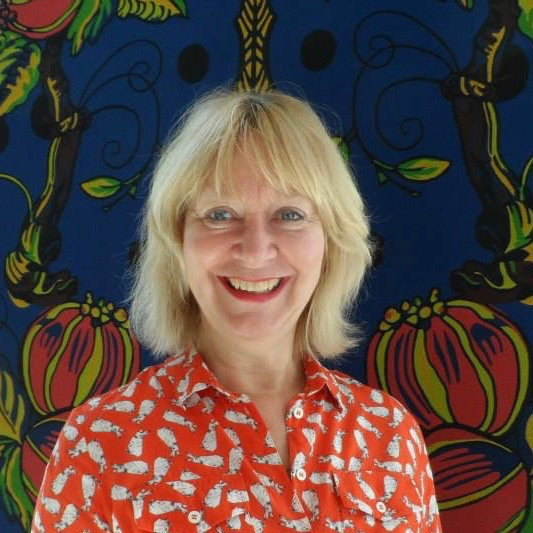
- Born: 22 October 1957 (age 68); Peterborough
- Citizenship: Dutch
- Known for: Museum Director
- Awards: Knight of the Order of Orange-Nassau

Diana A. Wind (born in Peterborough, Ontario, on 22 October 1957) is a Dutch art historian. For nearly two decades she was the director of the Stedelijk Museum Schiedam (1995–2016), which was comprehensively renovated under her management. She is also author of the book All About Drawing: 100 Dutch artists, seen as a leading work on contemporary Dutch drawing.

== Biography ==
Wind studied art history, economics and marketing at the Vrije Universiteit Amsterdam. During her studies she already worked in the Communications division of the Stedelijk Museum Amsterdam (1987–1989). Subsequently, she became Head of Marketing at the Department of Art & Culture in Groningen.

In 1995 Wind became director of the Stedelijk Museum Schiedam (1995–2016). During this time she was responsible for the renovation and privatisation of the museum. In 2011 Wind was awarded the distinction Knight of the Order of Orange-Nassau for her efforts for the museum and her many public functions.

== Selected exhibitions ==
- 1997. De Gouden Eeuw van Schiedam, 1598 – 1795. Stedelijk Museum Schiedam
- 2007. Lucebert. Schilder, Dichter, Fotograaf. Stedelijk Museum Schiedam. Also shown in Museum Danubiana, Bratislava.
- 2008. Verloren Paradijs. Monumentaal Tekenen. Stedelijk Museum Schiedam
- 2009. Virtuoze Zinsbegoochelingen. Stedelijk Museum Schiedam
- 2011. All About Drawing. 100 Nederlandse tekenaars. Stedelijk Museum Schiedam, together with Arno Kramer
- 2016. Ritme & Regelmaat: 70 jaar abstractie in de kunst, 1945 – 2015. Gallerie Witteveen
