= Diana C. Zollicoffer =

Seychellois actress

- Born: Diana C. Zollicoffer; 1977 (age 48–49); Seychelles
- Education: Duke Ellington School of the Arts
- Occupations: Director, producer, actress
- Years active: 1998–present

Diana C. Zollicoffer (born 1977) is a Black filmmaker and actress based out of Los Angeles. A native of the Seychelles, she was raised in Washington, DC and is particularly active in Indie film industry. She is best known as the producer of critically acclaimed productions such as Schmoolie the Deathwatcher, Bridget and Iain and Forgotten Bayou.

== Career ==
She has graduated from Duke Ellington School of the Arts, Washington DC.

== Filmography ==
Year	Film	Role	Genre	Ref.
1998	Celebrity	Actress: Newscaster	Film	
2002	All My Children	Actress: Doctor	TV Series	
2003	What Should You Do?	Actress: Alita BaconPrison Guard	TV Series	
2004	Stop Thief!	Actress: Prison Guard	Stage	
2005	The War at Home	Actress: Keisha	TV Series	
2005	Untold Stories of the ER	Actress: Reenactment / Tonya Jenkins	TV Series	
2006	Doggie Bag	Executive producer, assistant director, makeup artist	Short film	
2008	Single Serving	Co-producer, assistant director	TV series	
2008	Q: Secret Agent	Producer	Short film	
2009	B-Girl	Actress: Eunice	Film	
2010	I Love You Daddy	Actress: Head Nurse	Stage	
2012	Ten Men on the Field	Actress: Executive Assistant 7	Stage	
2013	Bloomers	Associate producer	TV series	
2013	Queen Cake	Co-producer	Short film	
2014	My Way	Producer	Short film	
2014	Fade to Black	Director, producer, writer	Short film	
2015	The Dinner Bash	Director, producer, writer	TV series	
2015	Schmoolie the Deathwatcher	Producer	Short film	
2016	Monster in the Bayou	Producer	Documentary short	
2016	Forgotten Bayou	Producer, writer, writer	Documentary	
2017	Bridget and Iain	Producer	Short film	
2019	Dreamer	Director, producer	Short film	
2019	Annny Minute Now	Director, writer, actress: Mrs. Driver	TV series	
2019	Honey and Clover: A Recipe for Disaster	Producer	Short film	
2019	Throw Like a Girl	Producer	Short film	
2019	Untitled Ben Brown Documentary	Director, producer, writer	Documentary	
TBD	Morning	Director, producer, writer, actress: Sharon	Short film	
TBD	Only the Lonely Sleeps	Director, producer, writer	Film	
TBD	FU: A Love Story in Reverse	Director, producer, writer	Film	
