= Diana Henry (food writer) =

British food writer

- Born: Diana Henry; October 1963 62 years
- Occupation: Food writer
- Writing career
- Genres: Cookbook; cookery column
- Notable awards: James Beard Award; 2016 A Bird in the Hand

Diana Henry (born October, 1963) is a British food writer. Born in Northern Ireland, she is author of nine cookery books on subjects including books on cooking chicken, healthy eating, gastropubs, preserving and Nordic cuisine.

== Life ==
Diana Henry was born in Northern Ireland and grew up there. Interested in food from an early age, cooking meals for her friends at the age of 12 or 13, she has said that she did not fully discover cooking until she went to France aged 15 as an exchange student, staying with a family who introduced her to olive oil and good everyday food.

Henry has said that she "never intended to be a food writer", having planned to be an actress or a lawyer. Her early career was as a TV producer, working on food programmes such as TV Dinners presented by Hugh Fearnley-Whittingstall. During her weekends she started cooking from books by Claudia Roden and Julia Child, going food shopping on London's Edgware Road. She has said of food shopping in London that "you might as well have been going to Cairo or something, it was all there". After the birth of her first child in 1998, she decided to become a food writer.

== Work ==
In 2002, Henry published her first book, Crazy Water Pickled Lemons, a collection of recipes from the Middle East, Mediterranean and North Africa. Chapter headings included Fruits of Longing featuring recipes for figs, quinces, pomegranates and dates, and The Spice Trail using cardamom, chili, cinnamon, cumin, ginger, coriander, pimenton and saffron. Since then, she has published eight further cookery books. She also writes a cookery column in Stella magazine in the Sunday Telegraph, for which she was named the Fortnum and Mason cookery writer of the year (2013) and won the Guild of Food Writers Cookery Book of the Year Award (2015) and the Evelyn Rose Award for Cookery Journalist of the Year (2015). She has also spoken about food on BBC Radio 4 Woman's Hour, and Radio 4's The Food Programme.

== Reception ==
Her work is characterised by exotic ingredients; Melissa Clark wrote in The New York Times that her writing, along with that of Yotam Ottolenghi, has "mastered the art of combining familiar and global flavors in ways that take us just past our collective culinary comfort level".

Sheila Dillon said "Diana Henry is Jane Grigson's real heir" on a two-part episode of the BBC Radio 4 The Food Programme broadcast on 22 Mar 2016. Dillon also said of Henry's writing, "Her enjoyment of cooking, ingredients and eating just comes off the page". Of her 2014 book A Change of Appetite, Melissa Clark wrote in The New York Times that "The thing about Ms. Henry's recipes is that if you didn't know they were supposed to be good for you, it would never cross your mind. In every one I tried, the flavors sparkled, the colors on the plate glowed, the dishes truly satisfied". Reviewing A Bird in the Hand, food writer Lisa Markwell wrote "Her tone is a welcoming mix of efficient and chummy (of fried chicken wings Henry warns of the health hazards of deep-frying, before adding in the next breath, 'I bloody love it')".

== Awards ==
In 2016, she won a James Beard Award for her cookbook of chicken recipes, A Bird in the Hand. Her first book, Crazy Water, Pickled Lemons, was shortlisted for the Glenfiddich award. For her column in "Stella" magazine, she won the Guild of Food Writers "cookery journalist of the year" in 2007, 2009 and 2015. In 2019, she won the Fortnum & Mason Cookery Writer Award, also for her "Stella" column.

== Bibliography ==
- Henry, Diana (2002). Crazy Water, Pickled Lemons. ISBN 978-1845336547.
- Henry, Diana (2003). The Gastropub Cookbook. ISBN 978-1840007428.
- Henry, Diana (2010). Food from Plenty. ISBN 978-1845335076.
- Henry, Diana (2010). Cook Simple. ISBN 978-1845335748.
- Henry, Diana (2012). Salt Sugar Smoke. ISBN 978-1845335649.
- Henry, Diana (2014). Roast Figs, Sugar Snow. ISBN 978-1845339746.
- Henry, Diana (2014). A Change of Appetite. ISBN 978-1845337841.
- Henry, Diana (2015). A Bird in the Hand. ISBN 978-1845338961.
- Henry, Diana (2016). SIMPLE: effortless food, big flavours. ISBN 978-1845338978.
- Henry, Diana (2018). How to Eat a Peach. ISBN 978-1784722647.
- Henry, Diana (2019). From the Oven to the Table. ISBN 978-1784726096.
- Henry, Diana (2025). Around the Table. ISBN 978-1846016004.
