= Diana Miglioretti =

American biostatistician

Diana Lynn Miglioretti is an American biostatistician specializing in the availability and effectiveness of breast cancer screening and in radiation hazards from medical imaging; she has also studied connections between Down syndrome and leukemia. She is Dean's Professor of Public Health Sciences and head of the biostatistics division in the UC Davis School of Medicine. She co-leads the U.S. Breast Cancer Surveillance Consortium.

== Education and career ==
Miglioretti graduated from the University of Maryland, College Park in 1992. She went to the Johns Hopkins Bloomberg School of Public Health for graduate study in biostatistics, earning a master's degree in 1996 and completing her Ph.D. in 2000. Her dissertation, Template Mixture Models for Functional Brain Mapping, was jointly supervised by Scott L. Zeger and Colin Craig McCulloch.

After completing her Ph.D., she became a researcher in the Group Health Cooperative in Seattle, also holding an affiliate faculty position in biostatistics in the University of Washington. She moved to the University of California, Davis as Dean's Professor in 2013, and was named chief of the Division of Biostatistics in 2019. Along with her position at Davis, she continues to hold an affiliation with the Kaiser Permanente Washington Health Research Institute.

== Recognition ==
Miglioretti was elected as a Fellow of the American Statistical Association in 2018. She won the Distinguished Investigator Award of the Association of Clinical and Translational Science in 2000.
