= Murder of Diana Miller =

American murder victim

- Location: The Villages, Florida, U.S.
- Date: July 21, 2006; 20 years ago
- Attack type: Murder, robbery
- Deaths: 1 (Miller)
- Victim: Diana Miller
- Perpetrator: Renaldo Devon McGirth

The murder of Diana Miller took place on July 21, 2006, when she and her husband James were robbed at gunpoint by three men in their family home in The Villages, Florida. Both James and Diana were shot in the back of the head with Diana's shooting being fatal. Sheila Miller, the disabled daughter of the couple, was kidnapped by the three men and taken in the family van to Ocala, Florida. The group entered a mall where the men used Sheila to withdraw cash from the family's personal bank accounts from several ATMs. Officers eventually caught up with the men and chased them down in a high-speed pursuit which resulted in a violent crash. One of the suspects was ejected from the vehicle during the crash and became pinned and trapped under the van. The robber who was identified as the shooter and killer of Diana Miller, Renaldo McGirth, was sentenced to death for the crime two years later, becoming the youngest person on death row in Florida at the time. On July 17, 2024, McGirth's sentence was commuted to life without parole.

== Background ==
Sheila Miller, the daughter of Diana and James Miller, had a long-term problem with alcohol and drug abuse. In 1989, she was arrested for drug possession. Just prior to the July 2006 murder, Sheila had been involved in a car accident, which had caused damage to her knee, pelvis, and toe, resulting in her moving back in with her parents at their family home in The Villages. Her parents were both retired and had rented beds, wheelchairs, and other equipment for her during her stay.

== Murder ==
Renaldo McGirth
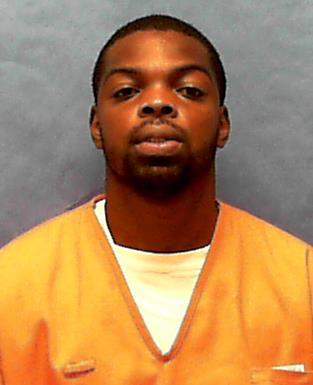
- Born: Renaldo Devon McGirth; April 29, 1988 (age 38); Ocala, Florida, U.S.
- Conviction: First-degree murder
- Penalty: Death (May 5, 2008); commuted to life without parole (July 17, 2024)

Details
- Imprisoned at: Union Correctional Institution

On July 21, 2006, Sheila received a phone call from her former drug dealer, Renaldo Devon McGirth, whom she only knew as "Pooney." She had not heard from him in over two years and had met him through an acquaintance. McGirth told her he had heard of her recent accident and sympathized with her. He told her he felt bad for her situation and had a gift for her, resulting in Sheila giving him directions to the family home. After giving McGirth directions, he and two accomplices, Theodore Houston and Jarrord Marqui Roberts, arrived at the house. Within minutes of their arrival, Sheila wheeled herself into her room to smoke a cigarette. McGirth and Houston followed her, then tied her hands, head, and mouth with duct tape. Sheila then watched McGirth shoot Diana Miller in the chest in her bedroom. Diana fell onto the bed and began coughing up blood. Despite this, Diana insisted she was fine and told Sheila everything would be alright. Afterward, Sheila was abducted by the trio and taken to the Millers' family van. McGirth then returned to the house and shot both Diana and her husband James in the back of the head. James survived, but Diana died later in the hospital. The three men then fled the scene with Sheila held hostage in the back of the stolen van.

== Chase and capture ==
The men drove to Ocala, Florida, where they forced Sheila into a mall and made her withdraw cash from ATMs with bank cards the trio had stolen from the family house. Diana and James were financially well off, influencing the men to carry out the home invasion. The men threatened to kill her if she did not comply with their demands. The Marion County Sheriff's Office had received 911 calls from James Miller informing them his wife had been shot and that his daughter had been kidnapped. Police found the suspects at a store north of Ocala on U.S. 441. A chase resulted after the suspects took off and continued at high speeds. The chase finally ended when deputies used stop sticks, which blew out the tires and eventually caused the van they were in to flip several times. One of the suspects was ejected from the van during the crash and pinned down under the vehicle. He would have been crushed to death had the van not landed on another car during the crash. The other two suspects tried to flee but were captured and arrested. Sheila was then pulled free from the van and rescued.

== Aftermath ==
Both James and Sheila survived the incident, but Diana died in hospital as a result of the gunshot wound to the back of the head inflicted by McGirth. The youngest of the three robbers, Theodore Houston, was seventeen at the time of the robbery. Houston agreed to testify against his two accomplices in exchange for a lighter sentence of twenty-five to forty years in prison as part of a plea agreement. Roberts was sentenced to spend the remainder of his life in jail but was spared the death penalty. After being identified as the shooter and killer of Diana, McGirth was sentenced to death at the age of 20 in 2008 for the murder, becoming the youngest man in Florida at the time to be on death row. His death sentence was overturned in 2017 because the jury did not vote unanimously. On July 17, 2024, McGirth was resentenced to life in prison without the possibility of parole. Houston was ultimately sentenced to 20 years in prison and has since been released. Roberts remains incarcerated.

Footage of the police chase with the van was recorded by the pursuing patrol car's dashboard camera. This footage was featured in an episode of Most Shocking as well as an interview with the pursuing officer, Lieutenant Bill Sowder, who described the chase and its aftermath.

== See also ==
- Capital punishment in Florida
- Capital punishment in the United States
