= Diana Pharaoh Francis =

American fantasy author and professor

- Born: 1966 or 1967 (age 58–59)
- Education: Oakmont High School; University of California, Davis (BA); Iowa State University; Ball State University (PhD)
- Occupations: Author; professor
- Writing career
- Genre: Fantasy
- Website: www.dianapfrancis.com

Diana Pharaoh Francis (born c. 1967) is an American fantasy author and professor, best known for her novels Path of Fate and The Cipher.

== Early life ==
Francis grew up on a cattle ranch in Northern California, near Lincoln. She attended Oakmont High School in Roseville, California, and in 1983, was Honored Queen of Bethel No. 336 in Job's Daughters International at Roseville.

== Education and career ==
Francis graduated with a BA from University of California, Davis in 1989, and then gained an MA from Iowa State University, both in creative writing, and a PhD from Ball State University in literature and literary theory. Her thesis focused on British women novelists (1858–65) and their portrayal of women. She then linked that to British post-colonial theory of controlling native populations in their colonies. She previously taught literature and writing at the University of Montana Western, and now teaches in the MFA program at Southern New Hampshire University. She lives in Oregon with her family.

== Writing ==
Francis' first book, Path of Fate, was favorably reviewed by Victoria Strauss. According to WorldCat, this is her most widely held book; it is held in 247 libraries.

== Bibliography ==
=== Path series ===
- Path of Fate (2003, Roc Books) ISBN 0-451-45950-4
- Path of Honor (2004, Roc Books) ISBN 0-451-45991-1
- Path of Blood (2006, Roc Books) ISBN 0-451-46082-0

=== Crosspointe series ===
- The Cipher (2007, Roc Books) ISBN 0-451-46179-7
- The Black Ship (2008, Roc Books) ISBN 0-451-46242-4
- The Turning Tide (2009, Roc Books) ISBN 0-451-46268-8
- The Hollow Crown (2010, Roc Books) ISBN 0-451-46339-0

=== Horngate Witches series ===
- Bitter Night (2009, Pocket Books) ISBN 1-416-59814-6
- Crimson Wind (2010, Pocket Books) ISBN 1-416-59815-4
- Shadow City (2011, Pocket Books) ISBN 1-451-61385-7
- Blood Winter (2012, Pocket Books) ISBN 1-451-61386-5

=== Diamond City Magic series ===
- Trace of Magic (2014)
- Edge of Dreams (2015)
- Whisper of Shadows (2016)
- Shades of Memory (2017)

=== Mission: Magic series ===
- The Incubus Job (2016)

=== Short Fiction series ===
- "Unexpected Choices," a Horngate Witches story, in Urban Enemies (August 2017) ISBN 9781501155086
- "Ashes and Dust" in Trials, A Rogue Mage Anthology. (November 2016)
- "Grasping Rainbows" in The Weird Wild West (December 2015)
- "Hunger Pains" in Demon Lovers: Succubi
- "Nothing Left to Lose" in Wolf Songs 2
- "In Between the Dark and the Light" in Furry Fantastic (October 2006)
- "All Things Being Not Quite Equal" in The Best of Dreams of Decadence (May 2003) ISBN 0451459180
