= Harry and Meghan (disambiguation) =

Harry & Meghan is a 2022 Netflix docuseries.

Harry and Meghan may also refer to:

- Prince Harry, Duke of Sussex (born 1984), youngest son of Charles III
- Meghan, Duchess of Sussex (born 1981), wife of Prince Harry, Duke of Sussex
- Harry & Meghan: A Royal Romance, a 2018 television film
- Harry & Meghan: Becoming Royal, a 2019 television film
- Harry & Meghan: Escaping the Palace, a 2021 television film

== See also ==
- Charles and Diana (disambiguation)
- Harry (disambiguation)
- Megan (disambiguation)
- Murders of Harry and Megan Tooze, 1993
- Oprah with Meghan and Harry, a 2021 television interview
- Prince Harry (disambiguation)
- Wedding of Prince Harry and Meghan Markle, 2018
- William and Catherine (disambiguation)
