= Melanie Nicholls-King =

Canadian actress

- Occupation: Actress
- Years active: 1992–present
- Children: 1

Melanie Nicholls-King is a Canadian actress, perhaps best known for playing Cheryl in the drama series The Wire, and for her portrayal of Officer Noelle Williams in the drama series Rookie Blue.

== Personal life ==
Nicholls-King is from Toronto. She is married and has a son.

== Filmography ==
=== Film ===
Year	Title	Role	Notes
1993	Guilty as Sin	Rosalie	
1994	The Babymaker: The Dr. Cecil Jacobson Story	Court Clerk	TV movie
1995	A Vow to Kill	Car Rental Agent	TV movie
1995	Rude	Jessica	
1995	Skin Deep	Montana Simpson	
1996	Closer and Closer	Detective Brand	TV movie
1998	The Defenders: Choice of Evils	Sarah Casey	TV movie
1998	A Cool, Dry Place	Dallas Desk Clerk	
1999	Summer's End	Mrs. Blakely	TV movie
1999	Coming Unglued	Stewardess	TV movie
2000	Mercy	Jane	
2000	The Color of Friendship	Flora	TV movie
2000	Catch a Falling Star	Ginger	TV movie
2000	Dear America: When Will This Cruel War Be Over?	Iris	TV movie
2000	One Kill	Angie Carson	TV movie
2001	What Makes a Family	Nora	TV movie
2001	Maple	Maple	Short
2001	Jett Jackson: The Movie	Jules Jackson	TV movie
2002	Society's Child	Monique	TV movie
2003	Deacons for Defense	Rose Clay	TV movie
2004	False Pretenses	Cerise	TV movie
2007	How She Move	Faye Green	
2009	Chains	Munk	Short
2011	In Between Life	Mona	Short
2012	Elijah the Prophet	Officer Walker	Short
2014	St. Vincent	Hospital Supervisor	
2017	The Strange Ones	Detective Reynolds	
2017	Filth City	Detective Mason	
2017	Going in Style	Cary Sachs	
2017	Mary Goes Round	Lou	
2018	The Week Of	Katrina	
2018	Harry & Meghan: A Royal Romance	Doria Ragland	TV movie
2018	Baby Won't You Please Come Home	Cynthia Reynolds	Short
2019	Extraordinary Life & Times of Mr. Ulric Cross	Amy Ashwood Garvey	
2019	Bushwick Beats	Louise	
2019	Harry & Meghan: Becoming Royal	Doria Ragland	TV movie
2020	Minor Premise	Dean Myers	
2021	Cupids	Cheryl	Short
2021	Harry & Meghan: Escaping the Palace	Doria Ragland	TV movie
2021	A Journal for Jordan	Kaleshia/Nanny	
2022	Life After You	Grief Counselor	
2024	Dandelion	Jean	
2024	Little Wing	Ms. Gibbons	
2025	Echo Valley	Joan	

=== Television ===
Year	Title	Role	Notes
1992–93	Street Justice	Adrienne Howell	Guest Cast: Season 2–3
1994	Catwalk	Erica	Episode: "Two-Legged Animals"
1994	Kung Fu: The Legend Continues	Nurse	Episode: "Kundela"
1995	Forever Knight	Dr. Turner	Episode: "Night in Question"
1998	Goosebumps	Teresa Erickson	Episode: "Chillogy: Parts 1–3"
1998	Animorphs	Aisha	Episode: "My Name Is Jake: Part 2"
1998	Highlander: The Raven	Officer Robbins	Recurring Cast
1998–2000	Traders	Justine	Recurring Cast: Season 4-5
1998–2001	The Famous Jett Jackson	Jules Jackson	Recurring Cast: Season 1, Guest: Season 3
1999	Deep in the City	Lori	Recurring Cast: Season 1
2000–04	Little Bill	Miss Murray (voice)	Guest: Season 1–2, Recurring Cast: Season 3–4
2001–04	Doc	Rochelle	Guest Cast: Season 2 & 5
2002	Law & Order	Trina Felton	Episode: "Girl Most Likely"
2002	Law & Order: Criminal Intent	Chesley Barnes	Episode: "Seizure"
2002–08	The Wire	Cheryl	Recurring Cast: Season 1–3, Guest: Season 4–5
2003	Law & Order: Special Victims Unit	Woman #3	Episode: "Desperate"
2004	Third Watch	Roberta Muskos	Episode: "Leap of Faith"
2008	Law & Order: Special Victims Unit	Jill Botas	Episode: "Undercover"
2009	Fear Itself	Anita	Episode: "The Circle"
2009	Cupid	Celia	Episode: "Live and Let Spy"
2009–10	One Life to Live	Judge Avery Hansen	Regular Cast
2010–15	Rookie Blue	Noelle Williams	Main Cast: Season 1–3, Recurring Cast: Season 4 & 6
2013	Orphan Black	Amelia	Recurring Cast: Season 1
2013	Hostages	Dr. Marsh	Episode: "Sister's Keeper"
2015	Eye Candy	Sergeant Catherine Shaw	Recurring Cast
2015	Happyish	Arianna	Episode: "Starring Josey Wales, Jesus Christ and the New York Times"
2015	Veep	Ms. Bennett	Recurring Cast: Season 4
2015	Show Me a Hero	Janet Rowan	Recurring Cast
2015	Saving Hope	Laverne Davis	Episode: "Shine a Light"
2016	Falling Water	Ann Marie Bowen	Recurring Cast: Season 1
2017	Conviction	Elyse Salmon	Episode: "Not Okay"
2017	Channel Zero: No-End House	Brenna Koja	Recurring Cast: Season 2
2017	Filth City	Detective Mason	Recurring Cast
2018	Star Trek: Discovery	Admiral Drake	Episode: "The War Without, The War Within"
2018	Seven Seconds	Marcelle	Recurring Cast
2018	NCIS: New Orleans	Dr. Mangold	Episode: "Empathy"
2018	The Amazing Gayl Pile	Diana	Episode: "The Feelin' It Network"
2018	The Detail	Amelia	Episode: "The Long Walk"
2018	Chicago Med	Ms. Larson	Episode: "The Parent Trap"
2018	Billions	Frances Lynch	Recurring Cast: Season 3
2018	The Sinner	Judge Miriam Cervini	Episode: "Part 2 & 8"
2018	FBI	Keisha Grant	Episode: "Pilot"
2019	Anne with an E	Hazel Lacroix	Recurring Cast: Season 3
2020	Blue Bloods	Judge Cheryl Harvey	Episode: "Careful What You Wish For"
2020	Diggstown	Alice	Recurring Cast: Season 2
2020	Little Fires Everywhere	Regina Wright	Recurring Cast
2020	Your Honor	Female Jones	Recurring Cast: Season 1
2022	Black Bird	Dr. Amelia Hackett	Recurring Cast
2023	The Gilded Age	Sarah J. Garnet	Recurring Cast: Season 2
2024	FBI: Most Wanted	Major Frannie Banks	Recurring Cast: Season 5
2026	American Horror Story: 13	Gwyn	Episode: "13"
