= Meghna (disambiguation) =

The Meghna is a major river in Bangladesh.

Meghna may also refer to:

- BNS Meghna, patrol craft of the Bangladeshi Navy
- Meghna Bank, Bangladeshi bank
- Meghna Group, Bangladeshi business group

People with the given name Meghna:

- Meghna Chakrabarti, Indian-American radio personality
- Meghna Gulzar (born 1973), Indian filmmaker
- Meghna Kothari, Indian actress
- Meghna Malik (born 1971), Indian actress
- Meghna Naidu (born 1982), Indian actress and dancer
- Meghna Nair (born 1989), Indian actress in Tamil and Malayalam films
- Meghna Pant, Indian novelist and journalist
- Meghna Venkat, Indian Bharatanatyam dancer
- Meghna Vincent (born 1990), South Indian television actress and dancer

== See also ==
- Megna (disambiguation)
- Meghana, a village in Rajasthan, India
- Meghana (name), alternative form of the Indian feminine given name
- Megha (disambiguation)
- Megan (disambiguation)
