= Titz =

- Municipality
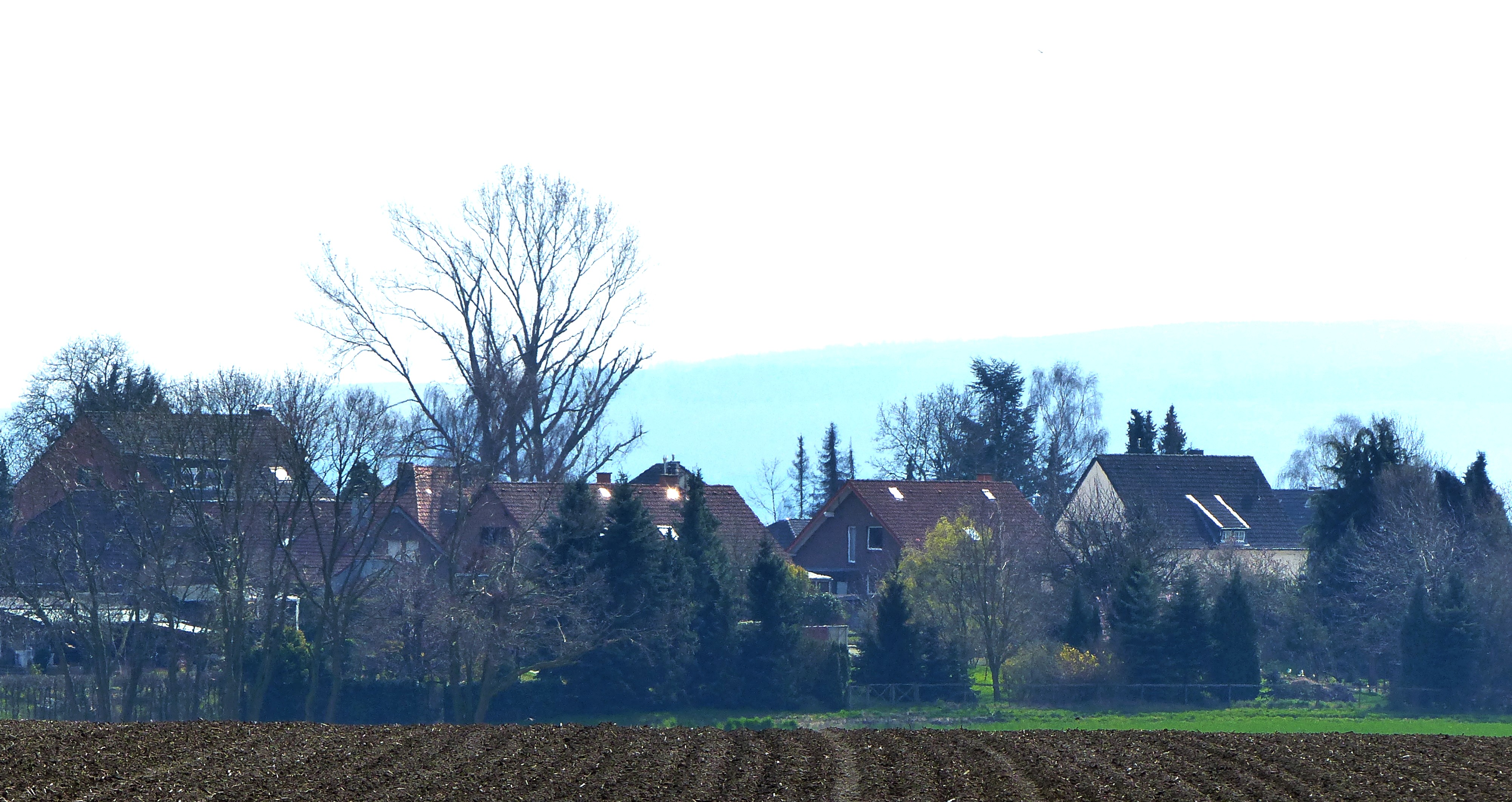

- Coat of arms

- Location of Titz within Düren district
- Interactive map of Titz
- Location within Germany Location within North Rhine-Westphalia
- Coordinates: 51°0′22″N 6°25′27″E
- Country: Germany
- State: North Rhine-Westphalia
- Admin. region: Köln
- District: Düren
- Subdivisions: 16

Government
  - Mayor (2020–25): Jürgen Frantzen (CDU)

Area
  - Total: 68.51 km^{2} (26.45 sq mi)
- Elevation: 95 m (312 ft)

Population (2025-12-31)
  - Total: 9,025
  - Density: 131.7/km^{2} (341.2/sq mi)
- Time zone: UTC+01:00 (CET)
  - Summer (DST): UTC+02:00 (CEST)
- Postal codes: 52445
- Dialling codes: 02463; 02164 (Jackerath)
- Vehicle registration: DN, JÜL, MON, or SLE
- Website: www.gemeinde-titz.de

Titz (German pronunciation: [ˈtɪts]) is a municipality in the district of Düren in the state of North Rhine-Westphalia, Germany. It is located approximately 10 kilometres (6.2 mi) north-east of Jülich and 20 kilometres (12 mi) south of Mönchengladbach.

Since the local government reform of 1975, Titz Municipality consists of 16 districts: Ameln, Bettenhoven, Gevelsdorf, Hasselsweiler, Höllen, Hompesch, Jackerath, Kalrath, Müntz, Mündt, Opherten, Ralshoven, Rödingen, Sevenich, Spiel and Titz.

== Population ==
Historical population

Year	Pop.	±% p.a.
1965	7,808	—
1970	7,571	−0.61%
1975	7,236	−0.90%
1980	7,336	+0.27%
1985	7,485	+0.40%
1990	7,705	+0.58%
1995	8,269	+1.42%

Year	Pop.	±% p.a.
2000	8,373	+0.25%
2005	8,541	+0.40%
2010	8,252	−0.69%
2015	8,277	+0.06%
2020	8,617	+0.81%
2025	9,025	+0.93%

Source: Landesdatabank Nordrhein-Westfalen

== Museum ==
- The LVR-Cultural Centre Village Synagogue Rödingen is dedicated to Jewish Life in rural Rhineland of past and present

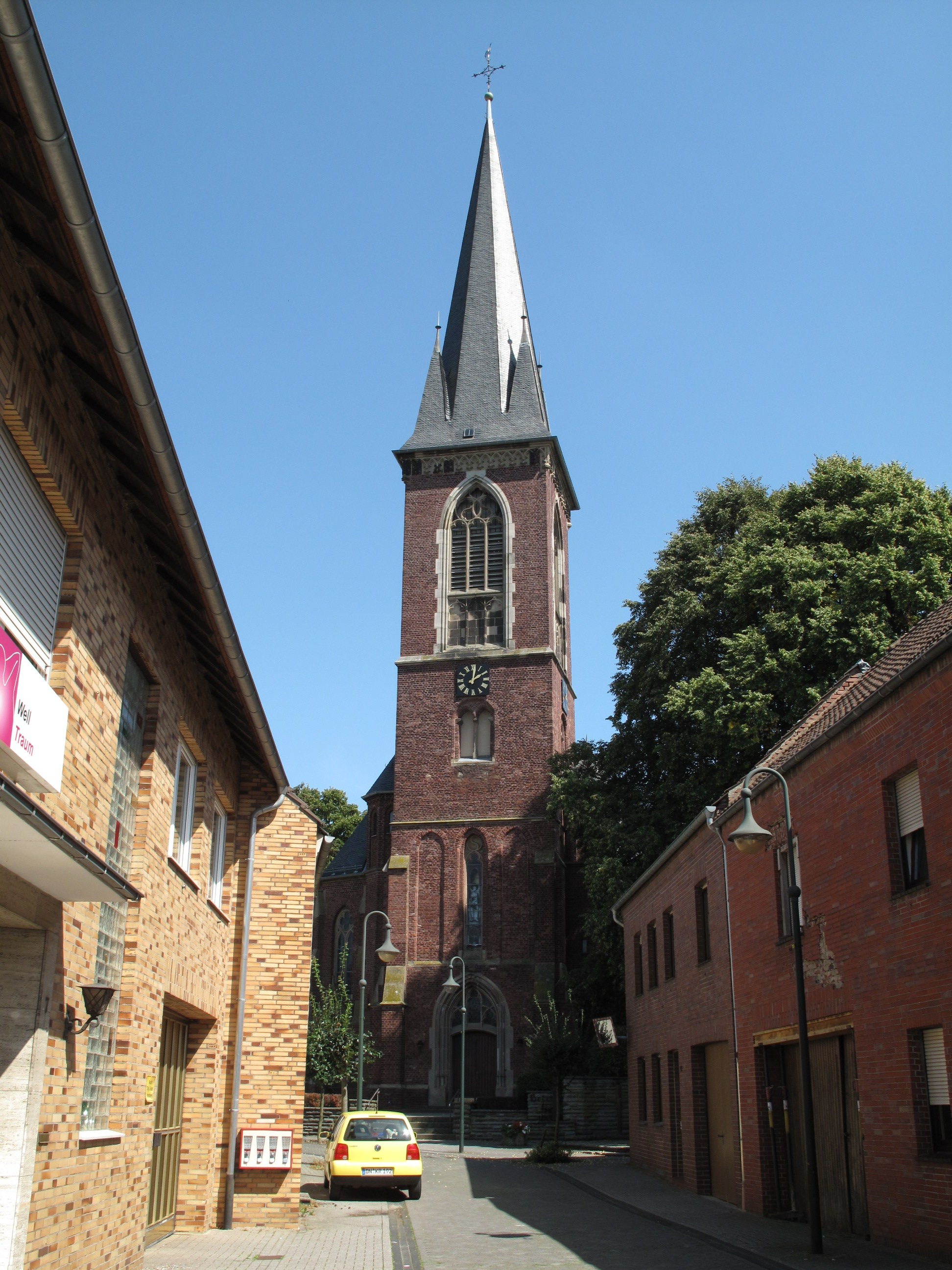

== Notable person ==
- Petra Hammesfahr (b. 1951), bestselling German novelist
