= Henry Prince =

Henry Prince may refer to:

- Henry Prince (politician), member of the New South Wales Legislative Council
- Henry Prince (general) (1811–1892), American general
- Henry Prince (chief) (c. 1819–1899), Saulteaux Indian chief

== See also ==
- Prince Henry (disambiguation)
