= Harry & Meghan: Becoming Royal =

2019 film directed by Menhaj Huda

- Written by: Terrence Coli; Scarlett Lacey
- Directed by: Menhaj Huda
- Starring: Murray Fraser; Parisa Fitz-Henley; Burgess Abernethy; Laura Mitchell; Steve Coulter; Melanie Nicholls-King; Clare Filipow; Deborah Ramsay
- Country of origin: United States
- Original language: English

Production
- Producers: Kyle A. Clark; Jamie Goehring; Lina Wong
- Running time: 87 minutes
- Production companies: Crown Productions; Cue the Dog Productions; Silver Screen Pictures

Original release
- Network: Lifetime
- Release: May 27, 2019

Harry & Meghan: Becoming Royal is a 2019 historical fiction television film about the royal wedding of Prince Harry and Meghan Markle and their first year of marriage. The movie originally aired on the Lifetime Network on May 27, 2019, as a sequel to Harry & Meghan: A Royal Romance. It was succeeded by Harry & Meghan: Escaping the Palace.

== Cast ==
- Charlie Field as Prince Harry, Duke of Sussex
- Tiffany Smith as Meghan, Duchess of Sussex
- Jordan Whalen as Prince William, Duke of Cambridge
- Bonnie Soper as Diana, Princess of Wales
- Charles Shaughnessy as Charles, Prince of Wales
- Deborah Ramsay as Camilla, Duchess of Cornwall
- Clare Filipow as Stella
- Marlie Collins as Annabella
- James Dreyfus as Sir Leonard Briggs
