= Midnight, Texas =

American television series

- Genre: Drama; Supernatural
- Based on: Midnight, Texas by Charlaine Harris
- Developed by: Monica Owusu-Breen
- Starring: François Arnaud; Dylan Bruce; Parisa Fitz-Henley; Arielle Kebbel; Jason Lewis; Peter Mensah; Sarah Ramos; Yul Vazquez; Sean Bridgers
- Composer: Jacob Groth
- Country of origin: United States
- Original language: English
- No. of seasons: 2
- No. of episodes: 19

Production
- Executive producers: Monica Owusu-Breen; David Janollari; Niels Arden Oplev; Nicole Snyder; Eric Carmelo
- Producers: Anne-Marie McGintee; Christopher Markey
- Production locations: Albuquerque, New Mexico; Las Vegas, New Mexico
- Cinematography: Mike Spragg; Eric Kress
- Editors: Timothy Good; John Heath; Arman Tahmizyan; Louis Cioffi
- Running time: 43 minutes
- Production companies: David Janollari Entertainment; Moorish Dignity Productions; Discord and Rhyme; Universal Television

Original release
- Network: NBC
- Release: July 24, 2017 – December 28, 2018

Midnight, Texas is an American supernatural drama television series broadcast on NBC. Midnight, Texas is based on the book series of the same name by author Charlaine Harris, who also wrote The Southern Vampire Mysteries, the novels which were adapted into the True Blood television series. The series premiered on July 24, 2017. On February 14, 2018, NBC renewed the series for a second season, which premiered on October 26, 2018.

On December 21, 2018, NBC canceled the series after two seasons, and the series finale aired on December 28, 2018. Producing studio Universal Television shopped the series to other outlets, without success.

== Synopsis ==
On the run from his past, young psychic Manfred Bernardo is told by the ghost of his grandmother to seek out refuge in the fictional town of Midnight, Texas. There, he will find a community that can help him. Full of diverse characters—including a vampire, a witch, a fallen angel, a half-demon and a werecreature—Midnight faces numerous threats from the outside world as it welcomes the newcomer.

== Cast and characters ==
=== Main ===
- François Arnaud as Manfred Bernardo, a psychic who moves to Midnight trying to outrun trouble that is following him.
- Arielle Kebbel as Olivia Charity, a freelance assassin with as many secrets as guns she owns, and wife of Lemuel.
- Peter Mensah as Lemuel "Lem" Bridger, a vampire with a dark past who first came to Midnight in the 1950s and never left, and Olivia's husband.
- Dylan Bruce as Bobo Winthrop, the human proprietor of Midnight Pawn, landlord to Lemuel, Olivia, and Manfred. Also, the best friend of Fiji, later her boyfriend.
- Parisa Fitz-Henley as Fiji Cavanaugh, a quirky free-spirited witch who owns Midnight's magic shop and struggles to come to terms with how powerful she really is.
- Jason Lewis as Joe Strong, a fallen angel who has prophesied darkness heading towards Midnight and husband of Chuy, who admonishes him for revealing his angelhood to others.
- Sarah Ramos as Creek Lovell (season 1; special guest, season 2), the mortal "girl next door beauty" waitress and gas-station attendant who becomes the love interest of Manfred, much to her father's distaste. Eventually, she reaches her limit with Midnight, and leaves town in "Head Games". She returns in "No More Mr. Nice Kai" but was later killed.
- Yul Vazquez as Reverend Emilio Sheehan (season 1; special guest, season 2), a quiet weretiger who presides over the Wedding Chapel and Pet Cemetery and their Midnighter patrons. He leaves Midnight in "To Witch Hell and Back" after Kai removes his weretiger curse.

=== Recurring ===
- Joanne Camp as Xylda, a former psychic and Manfred's grandmother and con-partner who now appears as a ghost to watch over him. She moves on after her tether to the world is broken.
- Kellee Stewart as Simone Davis/Madonna Reed, a fierce protector of her fellow Midnighters, and waitress and bartender at Midnight's Home Cookin' diner. It is revealed in season two she was operating under a fake name while spying on Olivia and she leaves town.
- Bernardo Saracino as Chuy Strong, a half-demon who, along with his husband, Joe, fears others will find out what they are. He is killed by Joe in season two.
- Bob Jesser as Shawn Lovell (season 1), the owner of Midnight's Gas 'N Go, who is an overly protective father to his children and distrusts Manfred.
- John-Paul Howard as Connor Lovell (season 1), the younger brother of Creek, who is as protective of her as she is of him. He harbors a secret of his own.
- Ryan McCartan as Jeremy (season 1), Fiji‘s boyfriend who she accidentally killed.
- Joe Smith as Mr. Snuggly (real name Jedediah), Fiji's talking familiar cat, who was previously the human lover of her aunt Mildred whom she turned into a cat to protect him.
- Nestor Carbonell as Kai Lucero (season 2), one of the owners of Midnight's new hotel, along with his wife Patience. Their sudden arrival in town causes a stir and has the Midnighters suspicious about what is really going on.
- Jaime Ray Newman as Patience Lucero (season 2), one of the owners of Midnight's new hotel, and Kai's wife.
- Josh Kelly as Walker Chisum (season 2), an openly gay demon hunter who has an intense connection with Joe Strong.

== Episodes ==
Season	Episodes	Originally released	
Season	Episodes	First released	Last released
1	10	July 24, 2017	September 18, 2017
2	9	October 26, 2018	December 28, 2018

=== Season 1 (2017) ===
No. overall	No. in season	Title	Directed by	Written by	Original release date	U.S. viewers (millions)
1	1	"Pilot"	Niels Arden Oplev	Monica Owusu-Breen	July 24, 2017	3.57
Pursued by a mysterious man named Hightower, young psychic Manfred Bernardo flees his life in Dallas and moves to the mysterious town of Midnight, Texas. While there, he meets the locals and forms a bond with a waitress named Creek. However, soon after his arrival the many members of the town begin to show impossible secrets, and a young woman named Aubrey Harrison is found dead. Manfred attempts to connect with Aubrey's spirit to solve her murder, but accidentally floods his house full of ghosts and evil spirits. Manfred uses her tip-off on his Ouija board to locate the murder weapon, which the police link to his landlord and Aubrey's fiancee Bobo. At the end of the episode, Bobo is arrested, much to the disbelief of the local community, especially local "wiccan" Fiji, who attacks the police car with magic. Manfred returns to his house to find it glowing orange and filled with ghosts and evil spirits.
2	2	"Bad Moon Rising"	David Solomon	Monica Owusu-Breen	July 31, 2017	3.29
Manny enlists the help of the other 'Midnighters' to try to get rid of the ghosts and demonic entity haunting his house, and Fiji performs an exorcism to try to encourage the spirits to move. As it is a full moon, the Reverend is locked in the church cellar. Meanwhile, Manny tries to help clear Bobo's name by allowing Aubrey to inhabit his body so that he can see what happened to her, before relaying this to the sheriff at Davey, who still seems skeptical but agrees to look into the matter. The sheriff's deputy locks Bobo up with a group of Sons of Lucifer members, all of whom he beats up, so the sheriff suspends her from duty. The deputy decides to go into town and opens the church cellar, releasing the Reverend who is a Were Tiger. Lemuel renders the Were Tiger unconscious thus saving the Reverend's life (as Olivia was going to shoot him with silver bullets). The demonic entity in Manny's home turns out to be a lot more powerful than it first seems, causing serious problems for Fiji. Bobo is freed after a Sons of Lucifer jacket with Aubrey's hair in its zipper is found downstream of her body. The Sons of Lucifer, led by Aubrey's husband Peter Lowry, then murder the sheriff by blowing up his car.
3	3	"Lemuel, Unchained"	David Solomon	Turi Meyer & Al Septien	August 7, 2017	3.06
An old friend (his sire) of Lemuel's arrives in town with a nest of vampires, claiming to want to stay the night for a catch up, although it's soon revealed that there's more to this visit than a reunion. Joe reveals he is a fallen angel to the Reverend, and shares his fears about what's happening in the town. Lemuel tells Olivia how he became a vampire, while Manny's grandmother reveals her own past with the vampire to her grandson (she was the one who gave Lemuel his power to feed on energy). The vampires incapacitate Lemuel and decide to kill everyone in town. Manny and the others prepare for a fight; with Joe's help, the vampires are destroyed and Olivia saves Lemuel from the sun. Creek and her father clash over her relationship with Manny.
4	4	"Sexy Beast"	Steve Shill	Liz Sagal	August 14, 2017	3.19
Bobo refers a client to Manfred, a woman who's looking for her younger brother, which leads Manfred to uncover a Succubus who seduces and feeds on men. Manfred asks the towns people for help; Fiji makes a potion which will remove the Succubus's glamour (make them unattractive) so she can no longer attract men to kill. Manfred and company end up killing it with fire. Olivia interrogates a man she discovered following her after completing a job; he turns out to be working for her father. She reveals that her father was absent during her life and left her with his drug-addicted wife, who pimped Olivia out to several men for drug money. She sends the man back to her father with a message to leave her alone. Meanwhile, Bobo tries to keep his past a secret, and he and Fiji finally kiss.
5	5	"Unearthed"	Milan Cheylov	Brynn Malone	August 21, 2017	2.85
The Sons of Lucifer bomb Bobo's shop with Lem and Olivia still inside, but this is just a distraction as they use this opportunity to kidnap Fiji. Bobo is told of the kidnapping by Mr. Snuggly, Fiji's talking familiar cat. Meanwhile, Manfred's dark past finally catches up to him when Hightower comes to Midnight. Creek ask Olivia to help Manfred. Olivia comes to Manfred's aid when he goes to meet Hightower, and find a corpse: Hightower's daughter Violet, whom he jilted at the altar. Manfred reveals to Creek and Olivia that he and Xylda conned Hightower by bethrothing Manfred to Violet in exchange for $100,000; they ran away with his money on the day of the wedding, and she committed suicide a few weeks later. Manfred calls on Violet's spirit to make peace with Hightower in order to spare his life. Violet angrily tells her father that she killed herself because of how he treated her throughout her life; the distraught Hightower commits suicide afterward. Lemuel asks Bobo what The Sons of Lucifer want; he shows him the weapons cache he has hidden, and reveals that his parents were rich white supremacists, who he ran away from. With Lemuel's help, Bobo rescues Fiji and they get rid of the Sons. After discovering the truth about Bobo's past, Fiji puts their relationship on hold and tells him that she needs time to think.
6	6	"Blinded by the Light"	Nick Gomez	Mark H. Kruger	August 28, 2017	3.37
Three boys and a girl come to town and vandalise the pet cemetery. The boys flee leaving the girl to walk home. The next morning the girl is reported missing. The Midnighters go looking for her and find the body of Tiffany, the girl from the vampire van (from Lemuel Unchained). Connor is found wandering with a head wound, claiming that he was hit from behind. Manfred and Lem go looking where Connor says that he was attacked and find the missing girl with Creek's father. The Rev reveals part of what he knows about Midnight and the veil in order to calm Fiji and Manfred, saying that he just heard it from a source. The Midnighters assume that Creek's father is the man who murdered Aubrey and Tiffany and kidnapped the girl, but he refuses to talk. Manfred goes to Creek's home and discovers that her father is not the killer, but Connor. Creek's father tells the Midnighters that the family could never have pets as Connor would torture them, and the doctors he consulted wanted to lock Connor away, so he brought the family to Midnight. Creek goes with Connor when he wants to run away, and the Midnighters are desperate to find her. Joe reveals his secret before he goes to search for her and uses his light to save her. Lemuel is forced to kill Connor.
7	7	"Angel Heart"	Mairzee Almas	Larry Caldwell & Liz Sagal	September 4, 2017	2.93
Bowie, an angelic bounty hunter and Joe's former mentor, arrives in Midnight to punish him for leaving the angelic fold. She attacks the Reverend to find out where Joe is. Joe and Chuy ask for their friends' help, disclosing that Chuy is a half demon and the story of how they met. Now also a fallen angel, Bowie wants revenge from Joe's humiliation. Joe's not strong enough to defeat his former mentor, so the Midnighter's plan to send Bowie through a portal. When the plan fails, Chuy transforms into a demon to kill her, and Joe is the only one who can help him turn back into a human. Joe also tells Manny his belief that he is the leader who will close Hell's breach forever. However, after Creek breaks up with him to find herself, Manny leaves Midnight.
8	8	"Last Temptation of Midnight"	Kevin Tancharoen	Monica Owusu-Breen	September 11, 2017	2.52
A faceless being is praying and steals the face (literally) of a priest and a truck driver whilst making its way to Midnight in order to usher in a demon's arrival from the veil to Hell with a human sacrifice. Fiji has a visit from a customer, Janice, who is having dark thoughts. When she goes to get Janice some herbs to make tea, Janice steals a knife from the shop and goes outside and tries to stab herself. Janice tells Fiji that a voice told her to kill herself. Manfred's grandmother Xylda confesses that she had a vision that confirms Joe's words and tries to convince him to return to Midnight, but his van breaks down and he gets lost in the desert. Olivia and Bobo are concerned about the effect of the veil; the Rev is eating meat and Lem is hungrier than usual. Creek asks Lem to leech her pain and Olivia tells her that it is not possible. Xylda finally convinces Manny to go back, and moves on to the afterlife. Manfred hitchhikes in the faceless being's truck, but manages to escape being killed. He returns and assists Fiji in preventing Creek from killing herself and Lemuel from turning Olivia, but the sacrifice is made.
9	9	"Riders on the Storm"	Greg Beeman	Al Septien & Turi Meyer	September 13, 2017	2.45
Fiji remembers her arrival to Midnight 10 years before, when her aunt Mildred told her that they were both witches and taught her about magic. As the veil breaks, an apocalyptic sandstorm engulfs Midnight. The Midnighters get together to protect Fiji. Manny digs up the grave of the shaman who closed the breach the first time around in order to try to raise the spirit but the remains have disintegrated. The Midnighters flee, but the sandstorm follows them, forcing them hide in an abandoned club. Fiji finally confesses that the demon, Colconnar, wants her because she is powerful virgin witch but she omits the fact that she accidentally killed her boyfriend, Jeremy during a passionate moment. Olivia tells Lemuel she is going to leave Midnight once Fiji is safe. Fiji and Manny find a way to get answers, but black magic requires a sacrifice. Mr. Snuggly offers himself, but the spell takes Manny's life instead. In the afterlife, Manny meets the shaman, who tells him how to close the veil. Colconnar's envoy, Jeremy, finds Fiji and tells her that if she comes to Colconnar willingly, he will spare the others. Manny returns to life, but Fiji has left.
10	10	"The Virgin Sacrifice"	David Solomon	Monica Owusu-Breen	September 18, 2017	2.72
With Hell literally about to erupt, Manfred leads the Midnighters back to town. Bobo, Creek and Olivia find Fiji, but Olivia is badly burnt by a wraith, and Creek must take her to a hospital. Manfred goes to the pawnshop as the shaman told him that to destroy evil he has to know evil. Manny allows himself to be possessed by demonic spirits from the shop's cursed artifacts. Bobo and Fiji make love so she will no longer be a virgin witch, and no longer of use to the demon. The enraged Colconnar says that everyone will die, but he's destroyed by the demon-possessed Manny, who then releases the spirits as agreed. At the hospital, Lemuel heals Olivia by giving her some of his blood. Manny and Creek reconcile. Madonna is shown working for Olivia's estranged father. One week later, they all reunite in the church for Olivia and Lemuel's wedding. The next morning, a new company arrives, wanting to renovate the old hotel for tourism, but Manny sees many spirits trapped inside.

=== Season 2 (2018) ===
No. overall	No. in season	Title	Directed by	Written by	Original release date	U.S. viewers (millions)
11	1	"Head Games"	Tim Andrew	Eric Charmelo & Nicole Snyder	October 26, 2018	1.94
Manfred starts bleeding black blood and discovers he's been sleepwalking, a side effect of his previous demonic possession. Taping a phone to his chest, he discovers he's dug eight graves in the Blanco Canyon. There, the ghost of his grandmother, Xylda, reappears. The group goes to the inauguration of the Crystal Spa, though they're suspicious of the owners, holistic healer Kai Lucero and his wife Patience. Kai heals a paraplegic man, but Olivia believes it's a fraud. Manfred hallucinates killing his friends and gets himself arrested for drunkenness but wakes up in his own bed. He sees his grandmother in his house, which is protected against ghosts, and realizes that he's hallucinating and it's already too late. A bunch of demons attack Joe, and he's helped by a demon hunter, Walker. Creek sees black blood-stained towels and warns Fiji. A possessed Manfred attacks her and tricks Olivia into going with him to Blanco Canyon, but Lemuel arrives in time to stop him from killing them. After Fiji is unable to exorcise him, Manfred begs them to kill him, but the Reverend arrives with the Luceros. Despite the others' mistrust, Kai is able to save him by removing the demonic residue from him. But Creek has reached her limit with Midnight and with Manfred, and so she breaks up with him and leaves for Austin. Meanwhile, at the Crystal Spa, Kai Lucero reveals a demonic head in the wall behind a painting, and swears to avenge him.
12	2	"The Monster of the Week Is Patriarchy"	Tim Andrew	Brynn Malone	November 2, 2018	1.98
Manfred spots a ghost murdering a guest at the Crystal Spa and investigates the mystery behind the ghosts. He ends up finding out that the murderous ghost committed a murder-suicide by killing his wife, of whom he was insanely possessive and suspicious, and then himself; their bodies lie underneath the hotel. Olivia and Lem have been having a hard time with their newfound relationship dynamic; Olivia does not like that Lem knows her every thought and feeling. Fiji and Bobo are shocked to find out that every time they touch Bobo is almost killed, meaning that the two and their relationship are cursed. Joe has been dodging calls from Walker. Manfred is able to find the bodies of the dead couple, and along with Fiji, helps them pass on to separate worlds. He confides in Patience, telling her he thinks he and Creek are done, despite still loving her. The Midnighters find out that Kai can turn supernaturals back into humans, but none wish to participate in the act. While Manfred is investigating Kai, whom he and the other Midnighters still do not trust, he finds the demon head hidden in Kai's office, and is knocked out by a strange force.
13	3	"To Witch Hell and Back"	Rob Greenlea	Turi Meyer & Alfredo Septién	November 9, 2018	1.94
Manfred still doesn't trust Kai, and is hesitant to trust Patience even after she tells him that Kai's hidden head is an ancestor of his from whom he gets his powers from. Fiji is horrified to learn that if she or Bobo even think about sex, Bobo gets hurt. Fiji tries to figure out who wants to hurt Bobo, and finds out that she's the one doing so. Manfred is able to deduce that Fiji's aunt Mildred is in a Hexennact (witch hell) and needs to talk to her about what's happening. The Rev is feeling extra apprehensive about the day's coming Devil Moon, and flashes back to a murder he committed ten years back during a transformation and how he took that man's identity. Joe meets up with Walker to take down some demons, but leaves quickly after he almost kisses Walker while showering. Patience offers Manfred a space in the resort to work from, which Manfred accepts as a chance to know more about Kai. Madonna has been in contact with Olivia's dad, who convinced her to get a sample of Olivia's blood. Manfred trades places with Mildred in Hexennacht; she tells Fiji that she is in witch hell for misuse of dark magic. Fiji finds out that their family has been cursed for 800 years for unknown reasons. Mildred tells her that she had to turn her lover Jedediah into Mr. Snuggly to save his life and that the curse is not about sex but about love; as long as Bobo loves her, he will die. Rev tells Lem he had Kai turn him human and leaves Midnight. Fiji tells Bobo that he is cursed because he isn't meant to be with her; she breaks up with him and walks away crying.
14	4	"I Put a Spell on You"	Rob Greenlea	Ken Hanes	November 16, 2018	2.08
A pregnant woman, in pain and bearing captivity injuries, stumbles into the church before her baby tears out of her stomach explosively. Lem finds the woman dead and a note asking for Rev to help the baby girl, Mary, who later turns out to be a weretiger who grows at an accelerated rate, becoming a teenager after one day. Lem tells Olivia he wanted to have kids before he was turned. Bobo still wants to be with Fiji, but she refuses. Mary's mother Sheila is being hunted by two men, after presumably escaping being held captive. Fiji makes Bobo forget who she is and he totally forgets he ever knew her. Mary kills her two hunters. Eventually her grandmother, Grace Barrone comes to town looking for her daughter, Sheila, and finds Mary. However, Olivia doesn't trust her, but is too late to stop her from taking Mary. Manfred talks to one of the hunters’ ghosts who says they wanted the girl for their supernatural fighting ring owned by Grace, which includes Mary's father Mike. The Midnighters infiltrate the ring, rescuing Mary and Mike, and leaving Grace at the mercy of the supernaturals she imprisoned. Mary and her father leave after saying goodbye to Lem and Olivia; the exchange leaves Olivia questioning her relationship with her father. Manfred and Patience almost kiss. After Bobo inadvertently regains his memories of him and Fiji, she turns him into a dog until she can figure out what to do about the curse. Olivia breaks down after Mary leaves, noting it has been such a long time since she had a family. Patience comes back to Manfred and the two have sex.
15	5	"Drown the Sadness in Chardonnay"	Stacey K. Black	Katie Lunskis	November 30, 2018	1.75
Lem sees Olivia dreaming of having a baby, and has Kai turn him human. Patience continues her affair with Manfred. Joe suggests to Fiji to look for other witches to help with the curse, but when she reaches out, she's told she does not belong there. Olivia has doubts about being able to be a mother. At the spa, Sequoia has committed suicide. Manfred allows her to possess him and finds out she was murdered by an invisible force. Olivia discovers that Madonna, whose real name is Simone Davis, has been working for her father, Philip, for ten years spying on her. Olivia tells her to leave town. A witch called Celeste visits Fiji, and tells her she's a dark witch as well, as she is a descendant of Theophilus, the original dark witch, rather than Delilah, the original white witch. Manfred and Joe discover an invisible force is spying on them. Olivia and Lem go to her father's house and find a nine year old version of Olivia with her mom still alive. Her dad has recreated them from his memories using a spell. At the hotel, Manfred discovers Lyric killed Sequoia because she was going to expose Kai. Lyric attacks him, forcing Manfred to kill her. Celeste tells Fiji that, to save Bobo, she has to pledge herself to the darkness. Olivia's dad puts her under the spell, and Lem calls Fiji for help. Philip tells Lem he can't let Olivia go because he'll lose them all. To undo the spell, Fiji allows the darkness to take control. Olivia tells her father that she has held onto her anger and pain to protect her from the loneliness he made her feel, but that it is time for her to move on, as she is no longer alone. Madonna leaves town. Fiji tells Bobo she's going to take control to save him. Manfred spies on Kai, and discovers he's stockpiling the supernatural powers he takes from others.
16	6	"No More Mr. Nice Kai"	PJ Pesce	Deirdre Mangan	December 7, 2018	1.89
Patience tells Manfred that Kai only keeps the powers as precaution. They're interrupted by Creek's return. She says Manfred left her a voicemail, but he denies making the call. Joe confesses to Chuy he's returned to demon hunting, and Chuy supports him. Manfred tells Lem to ask for his powers back to test Kai's intentions. Olivia tells Lem she'll love him as a human or as a vampire, and that she is willing to foster or adopt eventually. Another false voicemail reveals Patience's affair to Kai. Fiji pledges herself to Theophilus, cutting open her chest and pulling a blue butterfly from her heart. Her hair now has a grey streak, and she and Bobo have sex to test the curse. After Joe looks into a bad memory from Walker's childhood at his request, the two kiss and have sex. Kai lies to Lem, saying he can't give his powers back. Creek and Manfred fight over his affair with Patience before confessing they miss each other. Although the curse appears to be broken, Fiji is clearly undergoing an enormous personality change, becoming more self-centered. Manfred tries to get Creek out of town, but the two become stuck in a loop as all phones stop working and the town loses power. The pizza boy, Basil is revealed to be the trickster who's been messing with people, and confides in Fiji, as he knows she no longer cares about the Midnighters. Another fake phone call brings Walker to town to take out Chuy. Manfred and Joe check the head in Kai's office, which awakens at Joe's power. Lem recovers his powers thanks to Patience, who gives him the vial. Chuy finds out about Joe's cheating, and lets his demon half loose, attacking Walker until Joe stops him. After Basil reveals himself and gloats before vanishing, Lem states the only way to keep the trickster from coming back is to live their lives with no secrets. Fiji pretends to control the dark magic to keep Bobo in check. Creek appears to Manfred as a ghost, and she's unable to tell who killed her before disappearing.
17	7	"Resting Witch Face"	Neema Barnette	Kelli Breslin	December 14, 2018	2.42
Manfred believes Kai killed Creek, and vows revenge. The Midnighters hold a funeral for Creek while Joe is still looking for Chuy. Creek's body still cannot be found. To find out what Kai is up to, the group plans to translate the writing on the head. Joe finds that Chuy has been on a rampage murdering innocent people. Patience gives Manfred a stone to protect himself from Kai. Kai confronts Patience about the affair and tells her she needs to pick a side. The group is able to decipher that the head is trapped by a curse, which requires the power of seventy times seven beasts to break it, and Kai is harvesting the supernatural power to free it. Walker and Joe clash when Joe finds that Walker is determined to kill Chuy. Fiji puts Bobo to sleep and throws a monster party in his bar. When Bobo confronts her, Fiji claims she's everything she ever wanted to be now, and tells Bobo she doesn't love him anymore. Manfred learns that the head is that of Theophilus, the father of dark magic. Theophilus has a twin, whom the group believes to be Kai, and the two were the first dark witches and ancestors of Fiji, and if they are reunited, darkness will fall. The group finds that Fiji has been collecting parts of their bodies such as blood and hair, and that she has Creek's phone and keys—-she was the one who covered up Creek's death, and burned her body so she could not say who killed her. The purpose of Fiji's monster party is made clear, as she seduces two vampires and brings them to Kai to take their powers. The group subdues and ties down Fiji, who states that Theophilus led her to Kai's hotel, and Kai has all of the seventy times seven beasts and they can lift the curse with their sacrifice, implied to be Patience. Walker and Joe track down Chuy; Walker can't bring himself to kill Chuy because he loves Joe, and as Chuy is about to kill Walker, Joe is forced to kill him. Joe blames Walker for Chuy's death and tells him he never wants to see him again as he cuts off his wings onto Chuy's grave. Manfred and Lem storm the hotel to save Patience; Lem leeches her and brings her to where Fiji is being held, while Manfred confronts Kai. Kai reveals that Theophilus is not his twin, but Patience's. Kai was led to believe by Patience that the two were good witches cursed by a dark witch named Delilah over 800 years before. Manfred informs him that he has been misled, and that the twins will be the most powerful dark witches to walk the earth if they are reunited. As Patience frees Fiji, Kai tells Manfred the charm Patience gave him will really allow Theophilus to take over his body.
18	8	"Patience Is a Virtue"	Barbara Brown	Alfredo Septién & Turi Meyer	December 21, 2018	2.57
Manfred cannot break free from the necklace, and finds out he also cannot kill Patience. Manfred confronts Patience who tells him that she knew he was the perfect vessel to hold Theophilus. She also reveals that the reason Fiji's intention spell didn't work was because she created it. The group plan to get Fiji back on their side. Fiji and Patience determines they need to take down the Midnighters one by one, and resurrect Chuy to kill Joe. Joe tells Lem he cut off his wings to pay for his sins, to which Lem replies they are all sinners but he will get through it. Manfred transports inside the painting to get help from Delilah, the original white witch who took out Theophilus. While hiding from the monstrous knight inside the painting, Delilah tells Manfred of her history with the twins. 800 years before, she used to be friends with Patience (then known as Hypatia), and she was to wed Theophilus, by whom she became pregnant. However, Hypatia was in love with her brother and wanted more from him; upon the two acting on their twisted desire for each other, dark magic was born. The evil twins became too powerful, and Hypatia also became pregnant. The scorned Delilah beheaded Theophilus and bound the twins from doing magic, and cursed their descendants from ever finding true love; Hypatia retaliated by having her son Everard curse Delilah into the painting and be hunted by the beast for eternity. Bobo and Olivia get help from a Delilah named Addie to save Fiji. They retrieve her butterfly (which is actually her soul) from inside Bobo, but after doing so, Fiji finds them and kills her butterfly. Fiji uses Chuy's ghost to distract and disarm Joe, while Patience puts Lem to sleep. Manfred and Kai summon Everard to extract his supernatural powers in order to free Delilah. Bobo, Olivia, Lem, and Joe are led through the streets by a group of dark witches and forced to bear witness to the impending resurrection of Theophilus. When Manfred tries to end it and free Delilah, he is overpowered and captured. Patience calls upon Theophilus, and as the Midnighters console Manfred, she beheads and kills him.
19	9	"Yasss, Queen"	Nick Gomez	Eric Charmelo & Nicole Snyder & Even Twohy	December 28, 2018	2.42
Patience has seemingly defeated all the Midnighters, and her dark witch minions now control the town. Fiji attaches Theophilus' head onto the body of the slain Manfred on behalf of Patience using a binding spell, and the two incestuous evil siblings rejoice alongside Fiji while Joe, Lem, Olivia, and Bobo helplessly look on. Later, Patience relishes her victory and contemplates taking over the world. She attempts to tempt Joe, then corrupts him using Chuy's remains as a drug. The Midnighters are placed in a pen along with Addie. Olivia manages to get a key from one of their captors, and they escape. Olivia is recaptured by Joe, who is now a dark angel, and tortured by Patience. Manfred is revealed to have stayed with Walker. Kai had switched places with Manfred using a spell that made him appear to be Manfred and had sacrificed his life to ruin the return of Theophilus. Fiji steals and destroys more souls from the good witches to build a witch army for Patience. Theophilus' health quickly deteriorates, and Patience attempts to use Lem's blood to heal him, offering Lem a chance to see Olivia, who is scheduled to be burned at the stake for her defiance. They discuss their plight and their options. The other Midnighters are visited by the trickster demigod Basil, who offers to assist Bobo by bargaining to steal the soul of a stranger to restore Fiji's humanity and possibly turn the tide against the twins. Manfred appears at Olivia's execution disguised as an acolyte of Patience, preventing Patience's minions from joining the fight, and rallying the Midnighters. When Fiji lights Olivia's pyre, she reveals that Lem turned her into a vampire. Manfred and Addie plan to release Delilah from her painting imprisonment, when Bobo contacts Basil and agrees to the terms of restoring Fiji. She returns to herself and the two good witches free Delilah, who wages war against Patience. A desperate and deteriorating Theophilus fights Manfred, who decapitates him once more, causing Patience to fall into the spa pool in grief and despair. She absorbs the powers that she and Kai had collected, becoming even more powerful. A final battle against Patience occurs; Joe combats Walker and kills Addie before coming back to himself. Patience is defeated as the spirit of Kai enables Manfred to take away the powers she had absorbed, and Delilah imprisons Patience and her brother inside the forest hell forever. The Midnighters regroup and celebrate their victory, considering their next moves as Walker joins them. Joe decides to leave and atone for his sins. Fiji tells Bobo she is pregnant, and Bobo realizes that the soul restored to her may have come from their unborn child. Delilah leaves to restore the lost souls of the dark witches. Lem helps Olivia adjust to life as a vampire. Manfred is visited by Xylda who warns him that there is a new crisis coming as the knight from the painting walks into Midnight, much like Manfred did in the premiere.

== Production ==
=== Development ===
In October 2015, it was reported that NBC was developing based on Charlaine Harris' best-selling series Midnight, Texas for the fall of 2016. Monica Owusu-Breenis will pilot and serve as an EP alongside David Janollari. In January 2016, it's announced that NBC ordered the pilot episode of the series, with Niels Arden Oplev aboard to direct the pilot and executive produce.

The series was commissioned on May 13, 2016 which will be composed of 13 episodes.

On February 14, 2018, it was announced that NBC renewed the series for a second season. Along with the announcement it was reported that the showrunner Monica Owusu-Breen will be replaced by Nicole Snyder and Eric Charmelo, who were consulting producers on Season 1.

=== Casting ===
At the end of June 2016, it was announced that Jason Lewis promoted to a series regular which had been written as a guest starring/recurring interpreting to Joe Strong. On January 11, 2017, it was announced that Bob Jesser has booked recurring role in the series as Shawn Lovell, Creek's protective father. On July 26, 2017, it was announced that Breeda Wool will appear in an episode playing Bowie, described as a "regal, formidable angel warrior".

Simultaneously with the announcement of the renewal, it was confirmed that Yul Vazquez and Sarah Ramos would not return as series regulars for the second season.

On July 21, 2018, three new recurring roles were announced. Nestor Carbonell and Jaime Ray Newman were cast as Kai and Patience Lucero, owners of the new Crystal Desert lodge, while Josh Kelly was booked as Walker Chisum, an openly gay demon hunter with an "intense connection" to Joe. Trace Lysette was cast in a guest role as "a dark witch bearing a shocker for the town's resident good witch."

=== Filming ===
The pilot was filmed in April 2016 in Albuquerque and Las Vegas, New Mexico. The rest of the production of the first season also took place in Santa Fe, Bernalillo and Belen, employing over 450 New Mexico crew members and approximately 1,800 New Mexico background talent, and wrapped up in February 2017. Most of the scenes were shot at night and once wrapped at 7 or 8 a.m., five times a week.

== Release ==
=== Marketing ===
The official trailer of the series was released on March 20, 2017.

=== Home media ===
Region 1 DVD releases
DVD title	Episode count	Total running time	Release date(s)
Season One	10	428 minutes	February 20, 2018
Season Two	9	387 minutes	March 26, 2019

== Reception ==
=== Critical response ===
The review aggregation website Rotten Tomatoes reported a 61% approval rating for the first season, with an average rating of 5.34/10 based on 28 reviews. Metacritic, which uses a weighted average, assigned a first-season score of 50 out of 100, based on 16 reviews, indicating "mixed or average reviews".

=== Ratings ===
==== Overall ====
Viewership and ratings per season of Midnight, Texas
Season	Timeslot (ET)	Episodes	First aired		Last aired		TV season	Viewership rank	Avg. viewers (millions)
Season	Timeslot (ET)	Episodes	Date	Viewers (millions)	Date	Viewers (millions)	TV season	Viewership rank	Avg. viewers (millions)
1	Monday 10:00 p.m. (1–8, 10); Wednesday 10:00 p.m. (9)	10	July 24, 2017	3.57	September 18, 2017	2.72	2016–17	TBD	TBD
2	Friday 9:00 p.m. (1–6); Friday 8:00 p.m. (7–9)	9	October 26, 2018	1.94	December 28, 2018	2.42	2018–19	TBD	TBD

==== Season 1 ====
Viewership and ratings per episode of Midnight, Texas
No.	Title	Air date	Rating/share (18–49)	Viewers (millions)	DVR (18–49)	DVR viewers (millions)	Total (18–49)	Total viewers (millions)
1	"Pilot"	July 24, 2017	0.9/4	3.57	0.5	1.35	1.4	4.92
2	"Bad Moon Rising"	July 31, 2017	0.8/4	3.29	0.5	1.62	1.3	4.91
3	"Lemuel, Unchained"	August 7, 2017	0.8/3	3.06	0.5	1.66	1.3	4.72
4	"Sexy Beast"	August 14, 2017	0.7/3	3.19	0.6	1.65	1.3	4.84
5	"Unearthed"	August 21, 2017	0.6/3	2.85	0.2	0.70	0.8	3.46
6	"Blinded by the Light"	August 28, 2017	0.9/4	3.45	0.4	1.72	1.3	4.74
7	"Angel Heart"	September 4, 2017	0.7/3	2.93	—N/a	—N/a	—N/a	—N/a
8	"Last Temptation of Midnight"	September 11, 2017	0.6/2	2.52	0.5	1.53	1.1	4.05
9	"Riders on the Storm"	September 13, 2017	0.6/3	2.45	0.5	1.59	1.1	4.05
10	"The Virgin Sacrifice"	September 18, 2017	0.8/3	2.72	—N/a	—N/a	—N/a	—N/a

==== Season 2 ====
Viewership and ratings per episode of Midnight, Texas
No.	Title	Air date	Rating/share (18–49)	Viewers (millions)	DVR (18–49)	DVR viewers (millions)	Total (18–49)	Total viewers (millions)
1	"Head Games"	October 26, 2018	0.4/2	1.94	0.3	1.27	0.7	3.21
2	"The Monster of the Week Is Patriarchy"	November 2, 2018	0.4/2	1.98	0.3	1.23	0.7	3.21
3	"To Witch Hell and Back"	November 9, 2018	0.4/2	1.94	0.3	1.03	0.7	2.97
4	"I Put a Spell on You"	November 16, 2018	0.4/2	2.08	0.3	0.97	0.7	3.05
5	"Drown the Sadness in Chardonnay"	November 30, 2018	0.4/2	1.75	0.3	1.23	0.7	2.98
6	"No More Mr. Nice Kai"	December 7, 2018	0.4/2	1.89	0.2	1.03	0.6	2.92
7	"Resting Witch Face"	December 14, 2018	0.4/2	2.42	0.3	0.98	0.7	3.40
8	"Patience Is a Virtue"	December 21, 2018	0.4/2	2.57	0.3	0.95	0.7	3.54
9	"Yasss, Queen"	December 28, 2018	0.4/2	2.42	0.3	0.82	0.7	3.24
