= Megane =

Megane (眼鏡) is the Japanese word for eyeglasses. It may refer to:

- Megane (film), a 2007 comedy film by Naoko Ogigami
- Megane (Urusei Yatsura), an anime character
- Megane Bridge, a bridge in Nagasaki, Nagasaki, Japan
- Meganebashi, a bridge in Isahaya Park, Japan
- Leila Megàne (1891–1960), a Welsh opera singer (born Margaret Jones)
- Renault Mégane, a small family car produced by the French automaker Renault

== See also ==
- Megan (disambiguation)
