= LVR-Cultural Centre Village Synagogue Rödingen =

Former synagogue in North Rhine-Westphalia, Germany

- German: LVR-Kulturhaus Landsynagoge Rödingen
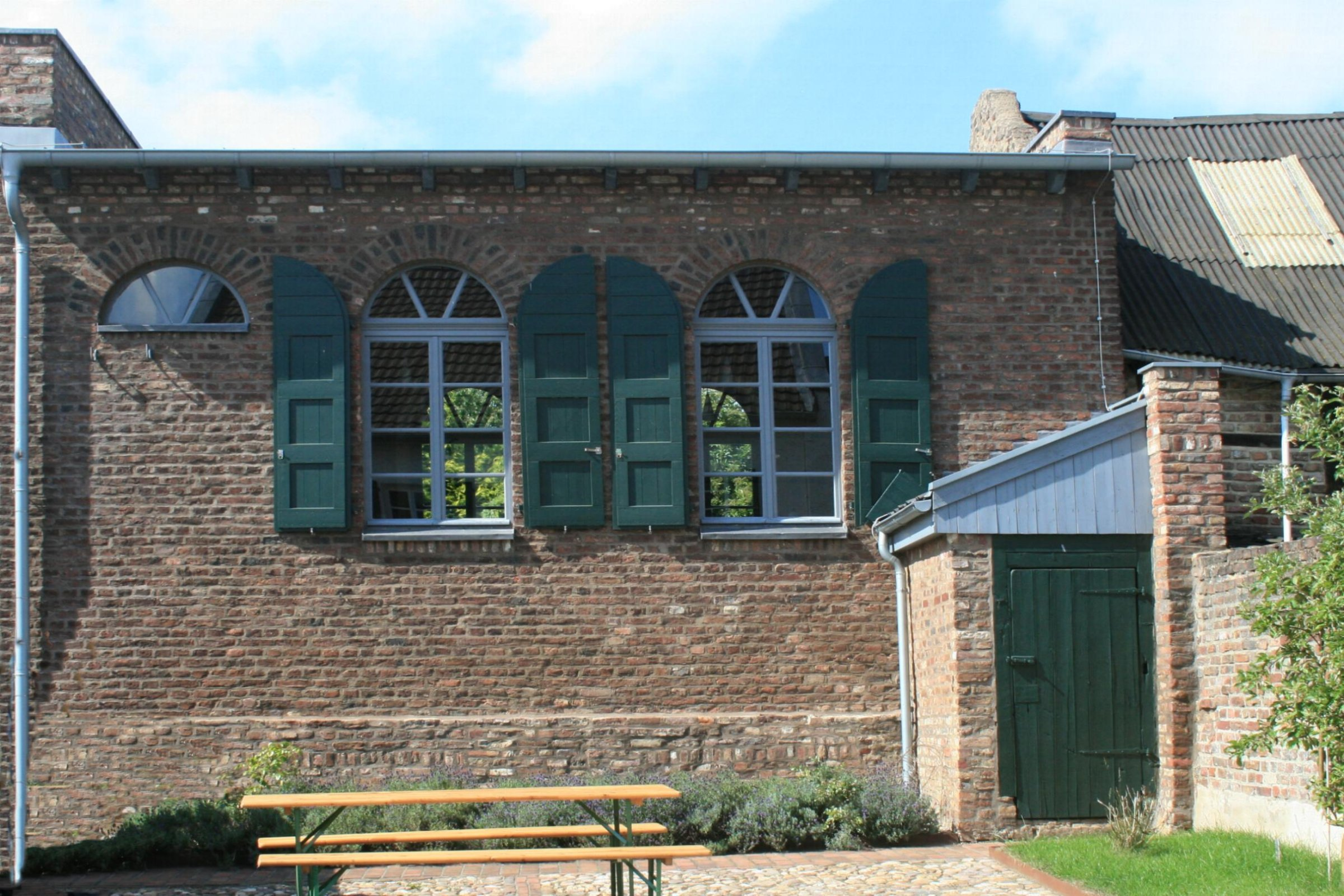
- The former synagogue in 2010

- Location of the former synagogue in North Rhine-Westphalia

Religion
- Affiliation: Judaism (former)
- Rite: Nusach Ashkenaz
- Ecclesiastical or organisational status: House (1789–1934); Synagogue (1841–1934); Jewish museum (since 2009)
- Status: Closed (as a synagogue); Repurposed (as a museum)

Location
- Location: Mühlenend 1, Rödingen, Titz, Düren, North Rhine-Westphalia
- Country: Germany
- Coordinates: 50°57′56″N 6°27′40″E

Architecture
- Type: House
- Completed: 1789 (as a house); 1841 (as a synagogue)
- Materials: Stone

The LVR-Cultural Centre Village Synagogue Rödingen (German: LVR-Kulturhaus Landsynagoge Rödingen) is a former synagogue in Rödingen, a district of Titz in Düren, North Rhine-Westphalia, Germany. The building originated as a house in the 18th century and was converted for use as a synagogue in 1841. Since 2009, it has operated as a Jewish museum and cultural centre.

== The former synagogue ==
In the synagogue is still the Torah niche, located on the eastern wall of the synagogue opposite the entrance. The original Torah ark (Hebrew: Aron Kodesh) with the ornate curtain, the parochet can be seen in a photo. Over the niche is still a long iron nail for the hanging of the Ner Tamid. The women's gallery also exists. The gallery is fronted with plain wood panels and supported on two slender wooden pillars. There are traces of the original decor.

== Museum ==
The museum's permanent exhibition is contained within a former family house of the head (Vorsteher) of the local Jewish community.

The museum is dedicated to past and present Jewish life in rural Rhineland. The former Rödingen synagogue is the only Jewish house of worship in the western Rhineland still largely in its original condition. In 1999 the Landschaftsverband Rheinland (LVR), an assembly of municipalities, bought the entire property with the intention of opening the buildings to the public. The cultural centre opened in September 2009, the European Day of Jewish Culture.

The exhibition is situated in the nine rooms of the family house. On the ground floor is a Media Room with a small library, the Family Room presents the stories of five generations of the Ullmann Family, who lived in this house from 1789 till 1934. In the Kosher kitchen are a number of exhibits. On the upper floor is the House and Synagogue History Room, the Village Sites Room with the theme Jewish cemetery, Judengasse (Jews' Alley) and jewish school. In The Rhineland Judaism Room is the Menorah from the former Synagogue in Vettweiß. In The Religion Room is a Torah Wimpel (Hebrew: mappah) from 1762 and a Sefer Torah fragment with the pointer (Hebrew: Jad).

The museum regularly hosts monthly lectures, workshops, seminars and concerts on Jewish religion and culture. It celebrates the yearly events International Museum Day, European Day of Jewish Culture and Tag des offenen Denkmals (European Heritage Days).

== See also ==
- History of the Jews in Germany
- List of synagogues in Germany (in German)
