= William and Catherine =

William and Catherine, William and Katherine, or William and Kate may refer to:

== People ==
- William I, King of Württemberg (1781–1864; r. 1816–1864)
- Catherine Pavlovna of Russia (1788–1819), first queen consort of William I, King of Württemberg
- William Booth (1829–1912), English Methodist preacher and co-founder of The Salvation Army
- Catherine Booth (1829–1890), English co-founder of The Salvation Army
- William, Prince of Wales (born 1982), heir apparent to Charles III, King of the United Kingdom
- Catherine, Princess of Wales (born 1982), wife of William, Prince of Wales

== Other uses ==
- Rosa 'William and Catherine', a white shrub rose
- William & Catherine: A Royal Romance, a 2011 American film
- William & Catherine: The Intimate Inside Story, a 2026 biography
- William and Catherine Biggs Farm, Detour, Maryland, United States
- William and Catherine Davern Farm House, Saint Paul, Minnesota, United States
- William & Kate: The Movie, a 2011 American film
- William and Katherine Estes Award, a National Academy of Sciences award

== See also ==
- William (disambiguation)
- Catherine (disambiguation)
- Booth University College (William and Catherine Booth College from 1997 to 2010), Winnipeg, Manitoba, Canada
- Charles and Diana (disambiguation)
- Harry and Meghan (disambiguation)
- Portrait of the Duke and Duchess of Cambridge, the first joint portrait of William, Prince of Wales, and Catherine, Princess of Wales
- Prince William (disambiguation)
- Victoria and Albert (disambiguation)
- Wedding of Prince William and Catherine Middleton
- William and Mary (disambiguation)
