= Megan (disambiguation) =

Megan is a feminine given name with variant spellings, including Meghan. A list of people with the name is included in the article.

Megan may also refer to:

== Films ==
- M3GAN, a 2022 horror film
- Megan (2018 film), a fan film based on the Cloverfield franchise

== Other uses ==
- MEGAN, a bioinformatics software for metagenomics
- Megan, a locality north-east of Dorrigo, New South Wales
- Megan (album), 2024 album by Megan Thee Stallion
- Megan (ship), a SpaceX Dragon recovery vessel

== See also ==
- Harry and Meghan (disambiguation)
- Megane (disambiguation)
- Meghna (disambiguation)
- Meggan (character), comics
- Megan's Law, a US law regarding sex offenders
- Mehigan, an Irish language surname that has the variants Megan, Meaghan and Meighan
- Renault Mégane, a car made by French vehicle manufacturer Renault
