= Megna =

Megna is a surname. Notable people with the surname include:

- Jaycob Megna (born 1992), American ice hockey player with the Seattle Kraken
- Jayson Megna (born 1990), American ice hockey player with the Anaheim Ducks
- John Megna (1952–1995), American actor
- Marc Megna (born 1976), American football player
- Robert Megna (born 1958), American politician
- Vince Megna (born 1944), American attorney

== See also ==
- Meghna (disambiguation)
- Magna (disambiguation)
