= Jonathan Caren =

American playwright and TV writer

Jonathan Caren is an American playwright, producer, and TV writer.

He co-executive produced Hulu's We Were the Lucky Ones, Netflix's Boots, and upcoming series The Sticks.

He was a member of the Primary Stages Dorothy Strelsin New American Writers Group, a MacDowell Colony Fellow, a Dramatist Guild Fellow, a winner of New York Stage and Film Founder's Award, a fellowship recipient of SPACE at Ryder Farm, a two-time Lecomte du Nouy award winner, and a recipient of the Theater Publicus Prize for Dramatic Fiction. Additionally, he was a finalist for the Laurents/Hatcher Award and a nominee for the Otis Guerney New American Playwright's Award. He was also a member of Center Theatre Group's L.A. Writer's Workshop.

His play The Morning The Sun Fell Down was adapted into a feature by Choice Films, starring Danny Pudi.

He is a graduate of Juilliard's Lila Acheson Wallace American Playwrights Program and Vassar College, where he studied mythology and religion.

== List of Works ==
=== Theatre ===
- Hit Machine (Soho Theatre 2026)
- Catch the Fish (New York International Fringe Festival 2007)
  - Recipient of the Outstanding Play Award
- The Morning the Sun Fell Down (Manhattan Theatre Club "7@7" Series 2013)
- The Venerable Raman Gupta (New Group 2014 New Works Lab)
  - Sundance Lab 2013 Finalist
- Need to Know (Colt Coeur Play Hotel 2015, Rogue Machine 2015)
  - Los Angeles Times Critic's Pick
- Four Woke Baes (Edinburgh Festival 2019)
- Canyon (Center Theatre Group)
- The Recommendation (IAMA 2014, The Flea 2013, Old Globe 2012)
  - Recipient of Craig Noel Award "Best New Play" 2012
  - Nominated for 2019 Jeff Theatre Award
  - Recipient of 2014 Ovation Award for Outstanding Play
  - Nominated for 23rd Annual NAACP Theatre Awards

=== Television ===
Year	Titles	Role(s)	Notes
2009	Melrose Place	Writer	Episode 1x07: "Windsor" (Written By)
2017	Gypsy	Executive Story Editor	10 episodes; Episode 1x04: "309" (Credited Story By, Teleplay By) Episode 1x08 "Marfa" (Credited Written By)
2018	A Million Little Things	Producer	Episode 1x09: "Perspective" (Written by)
2020-2021	The Sinner	Co-Executive Producer	16 Episodes; Episode 3x04: "Part IV" (Written by) Episode 4x02: "Part II" (Written by)
2024	We Were the Lucky Ones	Co-Executive Producer	8 episodes; Episode 1x05: "Ilha Das Flores" (Written by)
2024-(Present)	Bad Monkey	Co-Executive Producer	10 episodes
2025	Boots	Co-Executive Producer	8 episodes; Episode 1x02: "The Buddy System" (Written by)
2027	The Sticks	Co-Executive Producer	8 episodes
