= Natalie Paul =

American actress

- Education: Yale University (BA); New York University (MFA)
- Occupation: Actress
- Years active: 2012–present
- Known for: The Deuce, Smash, The Sinner, Power
- Awards: 2018 Black Reel Award for Outstanding Actress

Natalie Paul is an American actress. She has acted in several television shows such as The Deuce, Smash, The Sinner, and Power. She is best known for playing Doreen Henderson on Show Me a Hero and for her role as Antoinette in the film Crown Heights.

== Early life ==
Paul graduated with a B.A. from Yale University and a MFA from the New York University Tisch School of the Arts Graduate Acting Program. She is of Haitian descent.

== Career ==
Paul's first series regular was in the Yonkers housing drama Show Me a Hero as the budding community organizer Doreen Henderson. Her first film role was in Crown Heights in which she played the female lead. The film won several accolades, including the Audience Award at the Sundance Film Festival in 2017. Paul earned an NAACP Image Award for her role. Her subsequent series regular role was in the 1970s Times Square drama The Deuce as newspaper reporter Sandra Washington.

In 2018, Paul had a supporting role in the HBO show Random Acts of Flyness. In the same year, Paul starred in the former Lifetime thriller series You as Karen Minty. She also starred in the second season of The Sinner on USA. Paul has written and directed two short films, Everything Absolutely and Sweet Tea.

== Awards and nominations ==
Paul was nominated for a 2018 NAACP Image Award for Outstanding Actress in a Motion Picture and won the 2018 Black Reel Award for Outstanding Actress for her role in Crown Heights.

== Filmography ==
=== Film ===
Year	Title	Role	Notes
2017	Crown Heights	Antoinette	
2023	Shooting Stars	Gloria James	

=== Television ===
Year	Title	Role	Notes
2013	Smash	Actor #5	Episodes: "Musical Chairs", "The Fringe", and "The Read-Through"
2014	Boardwalk Empire	Beatrice Carson	Episodes: "Friendless Child" and "The Good Listener"
2015	Show Me a Hero	Doreen Henderson	Main role
2016	Law & Order: Special Victims Unit	Zahara Letts	Episode: "Intersecting Lives"
2016	Power	Candie	Episodes: "Don't Worry Baby" and "I Got This on Lock"
2016	Luke Cage	Dana Stryker	Episode: "Take It Personal"
2017	The Deuce	Sandra Washington	Main role (season 1)
2018	The Sinner	Heather Novack	Main role (season 2)
2018	You	Karen Minty	Guest role
2019	Mr. Mercedes	A. D. A. Sarah Pace	Recurring role
2019	The Blacklist	Francesca Campbell / Mila LaPorte	Recurring role

== Other work ==
Year	Title	Role	Director	Writer	Producer	Notes
2012	Everything Absolutely	Lady	Yes	Yes		Short film; co-director
2015	Sweet Tea	Nicki	Yes	Yes		Short film
