= Prince Hal (disambiguation) =

Prince Hal is the standard term referring to Shakespeare's portrayal of the then-Prince Henry V of England before his accession to the throne.

Prince Hal may also refer to:

- Hal Chase (1883–1947), an American baseball infielder nicknamed "Prince Hal"
- Hal Newhouser (1921–1998), an American baseball pitcher with the same nickname
- Hal Patterson (1932–2011), an American player of professional Canadian football nicknamed "Prince" Hal

== See also ==
- Hal Prince, an American theatre director
- Prince Harvey, an American rapper
- Prince Henry (disambiguation)
