= Prince Henry =

Prince Henry (or Prince Harry) may refer to:

== People ==
- Henry the Young King (1155–1183), son of Henry II of England, who was crowned king but predeceased his father
- Prince Henry the Navigator of Portugal (1394–1460), son of John I of Portugal
- Henry, Duke of Cornwall (January–February 1511), first-born son of Henry VIII of England and Catherine of Aragon, who died in infancy
- Henry Frederick, Prince of Wales (1593/94–1612), son of James VI and I of Scotland and England
- Prince Henry of Prussia (1726–1802), son of King Frederick William I of Prussia
- Prince Henry, Count of Bardi (1851–1905)
- Prince Henry of Prussia (born 1862) (1862–1929), son of Frederick III, German Emperor
- Prince Henry, Duke of Gloucester (1900–1974), third son of George V of the United Kingdom
- Prince Harry, Duke of Sussex (born 1984), second son of Charles III, and currently fifth in line to the throne of the United Kingdom

== Fictional characters ==
- Prince Hal or Prince Harry, a character in Shakespeare's Henry IV, based on the historical Henry V of England
- Prince Harry (Axis of Time), a character in Axis of Time series of alternative history novels by John Birmingham, published from 2004 onwards
- Prince Harry (Blackadder), a character in the first series of the British TV comedy The Black Adder in 1983
- Prince Henry Hanover-Stuart Fox, a character in the romance novel by American author Casey McQuiston, Red, White & Royal Blue (2019)

== Vehicles ==
- HMCS Prince Henry, a Canadian cruise liner and warship
- Vauxhall Prince Henry, a sports car of the 1910s

== See also ==
- Harry and Meghan (disambiguation)
- Henry, Prince of Wales (disambiguation)
- Henry Prince (disambiguation), people with the name Henry Prince
- Prince Henry of the Netherlands (disambiguation)
- Prince Henry of Prussia (disambiguation)
- Prince Henry's (disambiguation)
- Prince Hal (disambiguation)
