= Charles and Diana =

Charles and Diana most commonly refers to:

- Charles, Prince of Wales (born 1948), later Charles III (r. 2022–present)
- Diana, Princess of Wales (1961–1997), first wife of Charles

Charles and Diana or Charles & Diana may also refer to:

- Charles & Diana: A Royal Love Story, an American television film, 1982
- Charles and Diana: Unhappily Ever After, an American-Canadian television film, 1992

== See also ==
- Charles (disambiguation)
- Diana (disambiguation)
- Harry and Meghan (disambiguation)
- Prince Charles (disambiguation)
- Princess Diana (disambiguation)
- The Royal Romance of Charles and Diana, an American television film, 1982
- Wedding of Prince Charles and Lady Diana Spencer
- William and Catherine (disambiguation)
