= Prince Henry of the Netherlands =

Prince Henry of the Netherlands may refer to:

- Prince William Frederick Henry of the Netherlands (1820–1879), third son of King William II
- Duke Henry of Mecklenburg-Schwerin (1876–1934), spouse of Queen Wilhelmina

== See also ==
- Prince Henry (disambiguation)
