= Henry, Prince of Wales =

Henry, Prince of Wales may refer to:

- Henry V of England (between 1399 and 1413)
- Henry VIII of England (between 1502 and 1509)
- Henry Frederick, Prince of Wales (between 1603 and 1612), heir to James I of England, died before becoming king
- Harry, Prince of Wales (Blackadder), a fictional character in the first series of the British TV comedy Blackadder

Prince Henry of Wales may refer to:

- Prince Henry, Duke of Gloucester (1900–1974), known as Prince Henry of Wales between 1901 and 1910, third son of George V of the United Kingdom
- Prince Harry, Duke of Sussex (b. 1984), known as Prince Henry of Wales, between 1984 and 2022, and second son of Charles III of the United Kingdom

== See also ==
- Prince Henry (disambiguation)
