= Harry & Meghan: A Royal Romance =

2018 film directed by Menhaj Huda

- Poster
- Written by: Terrence Coli; Scarlett Lacey
- Directed by: Menhaj Huda
- Starring: Murray Fraser; Parisa Fitz-Henley; Burgess Abernethy; Laura Mitchell; Steve Coulter; Melanie Nicholls-King; Clare Filipow; Deborah Ramsay
- Country of origin: United States
- Original language: English

Production
- Producers: Kyle A. Clark; Jamie Goehring; Lina Wong
- Running time: 85 minutes
- Production companies: Crown Productions; Cue the Dog Productions; Silver Screen Pictures

Original release
- Network: Lifetime
- Release: May 13, 2018

Harry & Meghan: A Royal Romance is a 2018 historical fiction television film about the meeting and courtship of Prince Harry and Meghan Markle. The movie originally aired on the Lifetime Network on May 13, 2018, as a lead up to the real-life royal wedding six days later. The movie stars Murray Fraser and Parisa Fitz-Henley as the titular Prince Harry and Meghan Markle with Burgess Abernethy and Laura Mitchell co-starring as Prince William, Duke of Cambridge and Catherine, Duchess of Cambridge.

== Plot ==
The film opens with Harry as a young boy on an excursion in Africa with his family after his mother's funeral, where he has a dramatic encounter with a lion. The movie then cuts to Meghan as a young girl, grappling with issues of her biracial heritage and the media's depiction of gender roles. The movie jumps to the present where the couple are set up on a blind date and quickly fall in love. The movie follows their courtship and the intense global media attention surrounding them, as well as the reactions of family and friends to their romancing.

== Cast ==
- Murray Fraser as Prince Harry
- Parisa Fitz-Henley as Meghan Markle
- Burgess Abernethy as Prince William, Duke of Cambridge
- Laura Mitchell as Catherine, Duchess of Cambridge
- Bonnie Soper as Diana, Princess of Wales
- Steve Coulter as Charles, Prince of Wales
- Deborah Ramsay as Camilla, Duchess of Cornwall
- Clare Filipow as Stella
- Marlie Collins as Annabella
- Barbara Wallace as Lady Victoria
- Trevor Lerner as Thomas Markle
- Melanie Nicholls-King as Doria Ragland

== Sequels ==
The sequel, Harry & Meghan: Becoming Royal was broadcast by Lifetime on May 27, 2019, starring Charles Shaughnessy as Prince Charles; Charlie Field and Tiffany Smith in the title roles and covering their wedding and first year of marriage.

A second Lifetime sequel, title Harry & Meghan: Escaping the Palace starring Sydney Morton and covering their withdrawal from the royal family and the birth of their son Archie, premiered on September 6, 2021.
