= Prince Henry's =

Prince Henry's may refer to:

- Prince Henry's Grammar School, Otley, a school in Otley, West Yorkshire, England
- Prince Henry's High School, a school in Evesham, Worcestershire, England

== See also ==
- Prince Henry's Hospital (disambiguation)
- Prince Henry (disambiguation)
