= Terrence Coli =

American TV writer and producer

Terrence Coli is an American TV writer and producer. He is currently the showrunner and executive producer for the ABC series A Million Little Things. Coli has been a writer and producer for numerous shows, including One Tree Hill, Switched at Birth, Sorry For Your Loss, The Village and 90210.

== Career ==
Coli has been a co-executive producer and executive producer on long standing television dramas including One Tree Hill, where he got his start, 90210, and Switched at Birth. Before becoming executive producer of A Million Little Things, he was co-executive producer on the critically acclaimed series Sorry for Your Loss starring Elizabeth Olsen, and served as executive producer on the NBC series The Village. He also co-wrote the TV movie for Lifetime, Harry & Meghan: A Royal Romance.

== Filmography ==
Year	Title	Writer	Producer	Notes
2020-2023	A Million Little Things	Yes	Yes	Showrunner
2020	The Baker and The Beauty	Yes	Yes	Writer and co-executive producer
2019	BH90210	Yes	Yes	Writer and consulting producer
2019	The Village	Yes	Yes	Writer and executive producer
2018	Sorry for Your Loss	Yes	Yes	Writer and co-executive producer
2018	Harry & Meghan: A Royal Romance	Yes	No	Co-writer
2018	The Royals	Yes	No	Writer (1 episode)
2013-2017	Switched at Birth	Yes	Yes	Writer, consulting producer and executive producer
2016	Notorious	Yes	Yes	Writer and co-executive producer
2010-2013	90210	Yes	Yes	Writer, co-executive producer and supervising producer
2004-2010	One Tree Hill	Yes	Yes	Writer, supervising producer and co-producer
2002	Providence	Yes	No	Writer (2 episodes)
