= Meghana (name) =

Meghana is an Indian feminine given name and an occasional surname. It may refer to

- Meghana Erande (born 1981), Indian actress
- Meghana Gaonkar (born 1987), Indian actress
- Meghana Jakkampudi (born 1995), Indian badminton player
- Meghana Narayan (born 1977), Indian swimmer
- Meghana Raj, Indian actress

Surname

- Sabbhineni Meghana (born 1996), Indian cricketer

== See also ==
- Meghna (disambiguation)
- Meghan, Welsh female name
