= Henry Prince (politician) =

Australian politician

Henry Prince was an Australian politician.

He was a merchant, living in Sydney by 1851. He also had squatting interests, and was a partner in a Sydney mercantile firm. From 1858 to 1861 he served on the New South Wales Legislative Council.
