= Harry & Meghan: Escaping the Palace =

2021 film directed by Menhaj Huda

- Written by: Scarlett Lacey
- Directed by: Menhaj Huda
- Starring: Jordan Dean; Sydney Morton; Jordan Whalen; Laura Mitchell; Steve Coulter; Deborah Ramsay; Bonnie Soper; Keegan Connor Tracy; Maggie Sullivan
- Music by: Mario Grigorov
- Country of origin: United States
- Original language: English

Production
- Producers: Merideth Finn; Michele Weiss
- Running time: 87 minutes
- Production companies: Crown Productions; Cue the Dog Productions; Silver Screen Pictures

Original release
- Network: Lifetime
- Release: September 6, 2021

Harry & Meghan: Escaping the Palace is a 2021 historical fiction television film. Set three years after the royal wedding of Prince Harry, Duke of Sussex, and Meghan, Duchess of Sussex, it covers their withdrawal from the royal family and the birth of their son Archie. The movie originally aired on the Lifetime Network on September 6, 2021, and it constitutes a second sequel to Harry & Meghan: A Royal Romance from 2017 and Harry & Meghan: Becoming Royal from 2019.

== Cast ==
- Jordan Dean as Prince Harry, Duke of Sussex
- Sydney Morton as Meghan, Duchess of Sussex
- Jordan Whalen as Prince William, Duke of Cambridge
- Laura Mitchell as Catherine, Duchess of Cambridge
- Steve Coulter as Charles, Prince of Wales
- Deborah Ramsay as Camilla, Duchess of Cornwall
- Bonnie Soper as Diana, Princess of Wales
- Keegan Connor Tracy as Lady Victoria
- Maggie Sullivan as Queen Elizabeth II
