= Petra Hammesfahr =

German crime writer (born 1951)

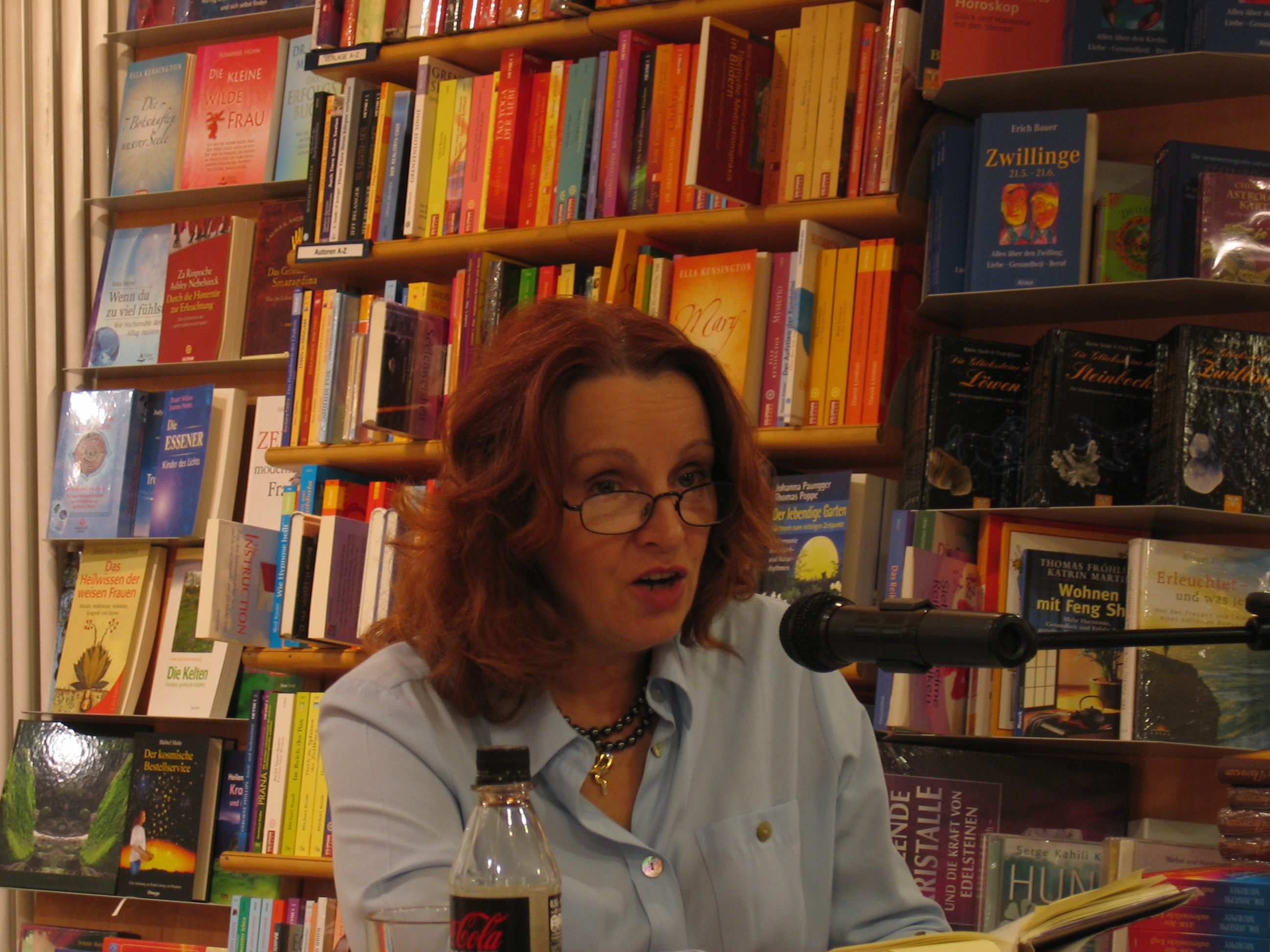
- Hammesfahr in 2008
- Born: 10 May 1951 (age 75); Immerath (Erkelenz), North Rhine-Westphalia, Germany

Petra Hammesfahr (German pronunciation: [ˈpeːtʁa ˈhaməsˌfaːɐ̯]; born 10 May 1951) is a German crime writer. She has won several awards, including the Crime Prize of Wiesbaden and the Rhineland Literary Prize.

Hammesfahr was born in Immerath (Erkelenz), North Rhine-Westphalia. Her first novel was published in 1991, followed by more than a dozen more and significant popular success by the middle of that decade.

She published over 40 novels in German. Her novel The Sinner was published in English by Bitter Lemon Press in 2007 and again in 2017 in the United States by Penguin Books, translated from the original by John Brownjohn. The Sinner has been adapted for television by USA Network as an eight-episode limited series starring Jessica Biel and Bill Pullman, and premiered on 2 August 2017. Despite initially being a limited series, the show would be renewed for three more seasons, finally ending on December 1, 2021.

A second translated novel, The Lie, was published by Bitter Lemon Press in 2010.

== Works ==
- Hammesfahr, Petra; Diana HC (2020). Nach dem Feuer : Roman (in German). München. ISBN 978-3-453-29243-7. OCLC 1197716443.
- Hammesfahr, Petra; Diana HC (2019). Das Mädchen Jannie Roman (in German). München. ISBN 978-3-453-29238-3. OCLC 1121483665.
- Hammesfahr, Petra (2014). Das Geheimnis der Puppe Roman (in German). München. ISBN 978-3-7844-6048-2. OCLC 884571998.
- Hammesfahr, Petra; Diana HC (2018). Als Luca verschwand Roman (in German). München. ISBN 978-3-453-29209-3. OCLC 1013471512.
- Hammesfahr, Petra (2004). Die Freundin : Erzählungen (in German). Reinbel bei Hamburg: Wunderlich. ISBN 3-8052-0726-3. OCLC 56568077.
- Hammesfahr, Petra (2011). Der Frauenjäger Roman (in German). Reinbek bei Hamburg. ISBN 978-3-8052-5014-6. OCLC 711810714.
- Hammesfahr, Petra; Diana HC (2016). Fremdes Leben Roman (in German). München. ISBN 978-3-453-35893-5. OCLC 932020924.
- Hammesfahr, Petra (2006). Am Anfang sind sie noch Kinder Roman (in German). Reinbek bei Hamburg. ISBN 3-8052-0818-9. OCLC 181495251.
- Hammesfahr, Petra (2007). Zum Sterben schön die spannendsten Weihnachtskrimis (in German). [Reinbek bei Hamburg]. ISBN 978-3-8052-0847-5. OCLC 188153292.
- Hammesfahr, Petra (2000). Der stille Herr Genardy Psychothriller (in Danish). Bergisch Gladbach. ISBN 978-3-7857-2023-3. OCLC 76199513.
- Hammesfahr, Petra (2000). Die Mutter : Roman (in German). Reinbeck bei Hamburg: Wunderlich. ISBN 3-8052-0673-9. OCLC 45218262.
- Hammesfahr, Petra (2008). Erinnerung an einen Mörder Roman (in German). [Reinbek bei Hamburg]. ISBN 978-3-8052-0860-4. OCLC 244078823.
- Hammesfahr, Petra (1999). Die Sünderin Roman (in German). [Reinbek bei Hamburg]. ISBN 978-3-8052-0632-7. OCLC 247260947.
- Hammesfahr, Petra (2012). Die Schuldlosen Roman (in German). Reinbek bei Hamburg. ISBN 978-3-8052-5039-9. OCLC 794504782.
- Hammesfahr, Petra (2002). Das letzte Opfer : Roman (in German). Reinbek bei Hamburg: Wunderlich. ISBN 3-8052-0700-X. OCLC 50908923.
- Hammesfahr, Petra (2014). An einem Tag im November Roman (in German). München. ISBN 978-3-453-29155-3. OCLC 890025286.
- Hammesfahr, Petra (1995). Der gläserne Himmel Roman (in Danish). Bergisch Gladbach. ISBN 978-3-7857-0763-0. OCLC 611944060.
- Hammesfahr, Petra (2005). Der Schatten : Roman (in German). [Reinbek bei Hamburg]: Wunderlich. ISBN 3-8052-0803-0. OCLC 65211071.
