= Meghna Venkat =

Indian classical Bharata Natyam dancer, choreographer and teacher

- Born: Meghna
- Citizenship: Indian
- Occupations: Dancer, Choreographer, Teacher
- Known for: Bharatanatyam
- Awards: Nritya Shiromani, Nritya Kowmudhi, Natya Chemmal

Meghna Venkat is an Indian classical Bharata Natyam dancer, choreographer and teacher. She is the disciple of guru shri Adyar K. Lakshman She has performed in many places in India. She is a regular artiste for Nada Neerajanam. She has participated in world dance day celebrations conducted by Sai arts International She is an em-paneled artist of The Ministry of Culture, Govt of India. She is a graded artist of Doordarshan. Selected for lectureship under UGC-NET Central Government examination. She is also a district level Badminton player.

== Awards ==
- 'Nritya Shiromani'
- 'Natya Chemmal'
- Nritya Kowmudhi
