= Parisa Fitz-Henley =

Jamaican-American actress and model

- Born: July 22, 1977 (age 49); Kingston, Jamaica
- Occupation: Actress
- Years active: 2006–present

Parisa Fitz-Henley (born July 22, 1977) is a Jamaican-born American actress, best known for her role as Reva Connors in Jessica Jones and Luke Cage. From 2017 to 2018, Fitz-Henley starred in the NBC drama Midnight, Texas.

== Early life ==
Fitz-Henley was born and raised in Kingston, Jamaica, where she attended St Andrew High School. She won the Fashion Model of the Year award in 1996 from the Pulse modeling agency. Her mother is of English/German/Italian descent and her father's ethnicity is Jamaican.

== Philanthropy ==
Fitz-Henley is on the advisory board of the Mona Foundation which works "to improve the lives of women and children around the world by funding educational initiatives." She and fellow actor Rainn Wilson hosted their 2022 virtual gala and are set to host the 2023 gala as well.

== Filmography ==
=== Film ===
Year	Title	Role	Notes
2006	Even Money	Caribbean Woman	
2006	Fist in the Eye	Megan	
2007	The Jane Austen Book Club	Corinne	
2009	Knuckle Draggers	Syra	
2009	Post Grad	College Friend #3	
2010	The Sorcerer's Apprentice	Bennet's girlfriend	
2012	Lola Versus	Peggy	
2013	Bluebird	Charlotte	
2015	Jack of the Red Hearts	Cynthia	
2015	People	Savannah	Short film
2016	Last Night, Los Angeles	Julea	Short film
2017	Things	Willow	Short film
2018	Congo Cabaret	Congo Rose	
2020	My Spy	Kate	
2020	Fantasy Island	Julia	

=== Television ===
Year	Title	Role	Notes
2006	CSI: NY	Charlene Franklin	Episode: "Super Men"
2006	The Unit	Laurenda George	Episodes: "Non-Permissive Environment", "Eating the Young"
2006	Studio 60 on the Sunset Strip	Celia	Episode: "The Cold Open"
2007	Grey's Anatomy	Cami Davis	Episode: "The Other Side of This Life"
2007	Private Practice	Cami Davis	Episode: "In Which Addison Has a Very Casual Get Together"
2012	Blue Bloods	Lizzy Hughes	Episode: "Greener Grass"
2013	Golden Boy	Andrea Gundersen	Episode: "Just Say No"
2013	The Mysteries of Laura	Bridget Flowers	Episode: "The Mystery of the Art Ace"
2014	House of Cards	Waitress	Episode: "Chapter 19"
2015	Jessica Jones	Reva Connors	3 episodes
2015	Redheads Anonymous	Hostess	Episode: "Two Redheads Walk Into a Bar..."
2016–2018	You're the Pest	Ms. Hernandez	Episodes: "Pilot", "Sick Beats"
2016–2018	Luke Cage	Reva Connors	4 episodes
2017–2018	Midnight, Texas	Fiji Cavanaugh	Series Regular
2017	The Girlfriend Experience	N/A	Episodes: "Living Like a Tornado", "Eggshells"
2018	Falling Water	Christy	Episodes: "Risk Assessment", "Nothing Personal"
2018	Harry & Meghan: A Royal Romance	Meghan, Duchess of Sussex	Television film
2020	The Sinner	Leela Burns	Series Regular (Season 3)
