= The Sinner (TV series) =

American crime drama television series (2017–2021)

- Title card for the first season
- Genre: Anthology; Crime drama; Mystery
- Based on: The Sinner by Petra Hammesfahr
- Developed by: Derek Simonds
- Starring: Bill Pullman; Jessica Hecht Season 1: Jessica Biel; Christopher Abbott; Dohn Norwood; Abby Miller; Season 2: Elisha Henig; Carrie Coon; Hannah Gross; Natalie Paul; Ellen Adair; Tracy Letts; Season 3: Matt Bomer; Parisa Fitz-Henley; Eddie Martinez; Chris Messina; Season 4: Alice Kremelberg; Michael Mosley; Frances Fisher; David Huynh; Cindy Cheung; Ronin Wong; Neal Huff
- Composer: Ronit Kirchman
- Country of origin: United States
- Original language: English
- No. of seasons: 4
- No. of episodes: 32

Production
- Executive producers: Jessica Biel; Michelle Purple; Derek Simonds; Antonio Campos; Charlie Gogolak; Bradford Winters; John David Coles
- Producer: Donna E. Bloom
- Production locations: New York; South Carolina
- Camera setup: Single-camera
- Running time: 40–54 minutes
- Production companies: Midnight Choir Inc.; Zaftig Films; Iron Ocean; Universal Content Productions

Original release
- Network: USA Network
- Release: August 2, 2017 – December 1, 2021

The Sinner is an American police procedural anthology television series developed by Derek Simonds for USA Network. It is named after Petra Hammesfahr's 1999 novel, which served as the basis for the first season. Bill Pullman stars as a police detective who investigates crimes committed by unlikely culprits and attempts to uncover their motivations. Only Pullman appears in every season, while the rest of the cast mostly changes for each season's story.

Intended as an eight-part miniseries, The Sinner premiered to critical acclaim and high ratings. The show's success led to USA Network turning it into an anthology series, which aired for four seasons from August 2, 2017, to December 1, 2021.

The first season of The Sinner received nominations for the Golden Globe Award for Best Miniseries or Television Film and Best Actress – Miniseries or Television Film for Jessica Biel. Biel was also nominated for a Primetime Emmy Award for Outstanding Lead Actress in a Limited Series or Movie.

== Premise ==
In the first season, Detective Harry Ambrose delves into the past of Cora Tannetti, a troubled woman, to determine why she stabbed a man to death.

In the second season, Ambrose returns to his hometown after a young boy named Julian Walker confesses to poisoning a couple and learns secrets that the inhabitants are determined to keep buried.

In the third season, Ambrose investigates a fatal car accident in Upstate New York and uncovers a much larger and disturbing case behind it.

In the fourth and last season, the now-retired Ambrose travels to coastal Maine to recover from the previous case. A tragedy occurs there involving the daughter of a prominent family, and he is recruited to help the investigation.

== Cast ==
=== Main ===
- Bill Pullman as Harry Ambrose, a police detective
  - Brady Jenness portrays the young Harry Ambrose in season 2
- Jessica Hecht as Sonya Barzel (seasons 3–4), an artist Harry begins dating in season 3

==== Season 1 ====
- Jessica Biel as Cora Tannetti
- Christopher Abbott as Mason Tannetti
- Dohn Norwood as Dan Leroy (guest season 2), a police detective
- Abby Miller as Caitlin Sullivan, a police sergeant

==== Season 2 ====
- Elisha Henig as Julian Walker
- Carrie Coon as Vera Walker
- Hannah Gross as Marin Calhoun
- Natalie Paul as Heather Novack, a police detective
- Ellen Adair as Bess McTeer
- Tracy Letts as Jack Novack

==== Season 3 ====
- Matt Bomer as Jamie Burns, an expectant father and Dorchester resident who seeks Harry's support after an accident
- Parisa Fitz-Henley as Leela Burns, Jamie's wife who is expecting their first child
- Eddie Martinez as Vic Soto, a Dorchester police detective who helps Harry on the case
- Chris Messina as Nick Haas, Jamie's friend from college

==== Season 4 ====
- Alice Kremelberg as Percy Muldoon
- Michael Mosley as Colin Muldoon
- Frances Fisher as Meg Muldoon
- David Huynh as CJ Lam
- Cindy Cheung as Stephanie Lam
- Ronin Wong as Mike Lam
- Neal Huff as Sean Muldoon

=== Recurring ===
==== Season 1 ====
- Joanna Adler as Anne Farmer, a police captain
- Danielle Burgess as Maddie Beecham
- Patti D'Arbanville as Lorna Tannetti, Mason's mother
- Kathryn Erbe as Faye Ambrose, Harry's wife
- Enid Graham as Elizabeth Lacey, Cora's mother
- Jacob Pitts as J. D. Lambert
- C. J. Wilson as William Lacey, Cora's father
- Nadia Alexander as Phoebe Lacey, Cora's sister
- Rebecca Wisocky as Margaret Lacey, Cora's aunt
- Eric Todd as Frankie Belmont, a beach-goer stabbed to death by Cora
- Robert Funaro as Ron Tannetti, Mason's father
- Grayson Eddey as Laine Tannetti, Cora's son

==== Season 2 ====
- Adam David Thompson as Adam Lowry, one of Julian's victims
- David Call as Andy "Brick" Brickowski, an officer working with Heather
- Jay O. Sanders as Tom Lidell, the police department's chief
- Allison Case as Rosemary Ambrose, Harry's mother
- Brennan Brown as Lionel Jeffries
- Maceo Oliver as Garrett, the manager of the boys' home where Julian is held in protective custody

==== Season 3 ====
- Layla Felder as Emma Hughes, Jamie's student
- Leslie Fray as Melanie, Harry's daughter
- Luke David Blumm as Eli, Harry's grandson

==== Season 4 ====
- Joe Cobden as Lou Raskin, Hanover Island's chief of police
- Kim Roberts as Greta

== Episodes ==
Season	Episodes	Originally released	
Season	Episodes	First released	Last released
1	8	August 2, 2017	September 20, 2017
2	8	August 1, 2018	September 19, 2018
3	8	February 6, 2020	March 26, 2020
4	8	October 13, 2021	December 1, 2021

=== Season 1 (2017) ===
No. overall	No. in season	Title	Directed by	Written by	Original release date	U.S. viewers (millions)
1	1	"Part I"	Antonio Campos	Derek Simonds	August 2, 2017	1.63
Cora Tannetti, who was raised by religious zealots in upstate New York, is now married to Mason and is the mother of a toddler, Laine. At the lake with her husband and son, she almost drowns herself, but changes her mind. Back on the beach she cuts up a pear for Laine and sees a couple kissing and playing music. She repeatedly stabs one of them, a young doctor named Frankie Belmont, with the paring knife. While killing him, she shouts, "Get off her!" Detectives Harry Ambrose and Dan Leroy are assigned the case. Cora confesses, and Dan views the case as closed, while Harry wishes to learn why she committed a random murder.
2	2	"Part II"	Antonio Campos	Derek Simonds	August 9, 2017	1.41
Cora pleads guilty to second-degree murder to avoid a trial, but the judge orders a competency evaluation after a call from Harry. Cora reflects on her childhood when her little sister, Phoebe, was chronically ill and their mother was obsessed with sin, convincing her that Phoebe's illness was God's punishment for Cora's sins. After learning that Frankie seemed to recognize Cora at the lake, Cora admits that, in 2012, she had sex with Frankie after meeting him in a bar, only he called himself "J. D." She claims it resulted in her getting pregnant and that she walked in front of a car and had a miscarriage. There is no record of a hospital stay, and Cora claims a man found her and took care of her. Frankie's father insists his son was in California in the summer of 2012. Harry, who is separated from his wife but undergoing marital counseling, regularly visits a dominatrix. Harry confronts Cora, forcing her to listen to the music that was playing when she stabbed Frankie, and she violently attacks Harry. Harry realizes the pattern of his bruises from Cora's punches are identical to the stab wounds she inflicted on Frankie Belmont.
3	3	"Part III"	Antonio Campos	Derek Simonds	August 16, 2017	1.64
Harry visits Cora's parents, whom Cora had claimed were dead. They tell him about Cora's late sister, Phoebe, who died of cancer a month after Cora disappeared in 2012. Cora has dreams of a foot crushing a woman's sternum and wakes up screaming. While attempting to sedate Cora, the prison staff expose scars on her arms. When Harry visits Cora, she admits she had a heroin addiction but begs him not to tell Mason, who thinks the scars were from a bacterial infection. Harry visits the detox center Cora was taken to after she reappeared and is surprised to hear she had clean hair and new clothes when she arrived, in contrast to the appearance of homeless addicts typically found at the state-run facility. He finds the man who checked her into rehab, confirming her story of being taken in and cared for after being found in the street. Harry confronts Cora with drug paraphernalia and asks her to show him how she injected herself with heroin, revealing that she doesn't know how. Mason's friend points out the real J. D. at a bar, and the two provoke each other into a fistfight.
4	4	"Part IV"	Brad Anderson	Liz W. Garcia	August 23, 2017	1.76
Mason and J. D. are arrested and questioned. Mason tells Dan that J. D. is a drug dealer. J. D. tells Harry he has never met Cora, even though Harry says Cora remembers meeting him in a bar on July 3, 2012. J. D.'s lawyer, Mr. Herting, whom Dan recognizes as an affluent hedge fund lawyer, ends the interview. Dan and Harry wonder why J. D. has such a high-powered lawyer. Harry questions Cora and realizes she does not remember anything between July 3, 2012, and waking up in an alley in Poughkeepsie two months later. Harry convinces Dr. Chang, one of Cora's competency evaluators, to try memory recovery with Cora. Harry looks for J. D.'s ex-girlfriend, Madeline Beecham, and Mason tries to get J. D. arrested for drug-dealing. Cora begins to remember pieces of the missing two months, including a room with strange wallpaper and a man in a balaclava. Harry reunites with his estranged wife, Faye. They go on a hike to survey the woods he believes Cora was remembering and he discovers an abandoned school bus Cora mentioned in therapy, along with what appears to be a grave.
5	5	"Part V"	Cherien Dabis	Jesse McKeown	August 30, 2017	1.84
The police uncover a body buried in the woods and believe it to be Maddie Beecham, who was last seen in 2012. Harry wanders from the crime scene and discovers an exclusive country club, the Beverwyck Club. He is later reprimanded by his chief, who is friends with the club's lawyer, Mr. Herting, who also represents J. D. State Police Captain Farmer takes the lead on the investigation and unsuccessfully attempts to get Cora to confess to both murders. After Mason's father is beaten with a baseball bat by J. D., Mason goes to J. D.'s house with a gun. Faye tells Harry she wants him out of the house again. In 2012, Cora and Phoebe secretly plot to move to Naples, Florida, and Phoebe pushes Cora to meet men online and steal from them. When one man gets angry when Cora tries to leave, J. D. intervenes. She loses her virginity to J. D. that night, contradicting her previous story about meeting him. She returns home the next day, upsetting Phoebe and their mother, who calls her a whore.
6	6	"Part VI"	Jody Lee Lipes	Tom Pabst	September 6, 2017	1.84
Two men quickly leave J. D.'s house, and Mason enters to find him dead. He anonymously calls 911 from J. D.'s phone and quickly disposes of the gun. Security cameras lead the police to Mason, though they suspect drug dealers. Cora's DNA is found on the blanket wrapped around the body believed to be Maddie. Cora convinces Harry to take her to the Beverwyck Club in an attempt to recall her memories. She is convinced the basement is not the place she remembers. After briefly stopping at her parents' former house, Cora remembers Phoebe celebrating a birthday and asks Harry to return to the Beverwyck Club, where she finds a separate building on the grounds, which she remembers. In 2012, Cora's relationship with J. D. intensifies. Phoebe, jealous of Cora, urges her to share intimate details of their relationship but accuses her of abandoning their plans to move to Florida.
7	7	"Part VII"	Tucker Gates	Liz W. Garcia	September 13, 2017	1.84
Cora remembers the events of the July 4, 2012. On Phoebe's 19th birthday, she convinces Cora to take her out for the night. Maddie attempts to warn Cora about J. D., telling her that he abandoned his previous girlfriend, who then walked into traffic and had a miscarriage – the same story Cora told Harry as her own. Cora later discovers Maddie is the one who had the miscarriage. J. D. offers Phoebe drugs and she takes them before Cora can stop her. Cora confesses to Phoebe that she plans to move in with J. D. and leave home for good. At the Beverwyck Club, they are welcomed by Frankie, who is hiding at the club, and who immediately connects with Phoebe. The group does drugs in the basement, and Cora realizes it was Phoebe in her hallucinations, not Maddie. Phoebe dies while having sex with Frankie, as his song plays. He tries to perform CPR but breaks her sternum. Cora attacks him in the same manner as the murder before J. D. knocks her out.
8	8	"Part VIII"	Tucker Gates	Jesse McKeown & Tom Pabst	September 20, 2017	2.44
Harry tracks the men suspected of killing J. D. to a fake medical clinic. One of the men, Duffy, is killed and the other admits Duffy killed J. D., who was running a major opioid ring. Harry finds Maddie alive, and she tells him J. D. started the ring immediately after the night Phoebe was killed. All of the doctors whose licenses were fraudulently used by J. D. were colleagues of Dr. Patrick Belmont, Frankie's father. The body found in the woods is confirmed as Phoebe, disposed of by J. D. and Dr. Belmont. Harry takes Cora to the Belmont house, where she remembers the remaining events. Dr. Belmont had held her captive for two months in the wallpapered room, drugging her to prevent her from remembering, and hiding his identity with the mask. J. D. blackmailed Dr. Belmont to support his opioid ring. Cora's sentence is reduced due to extreme emotional disturbance. The judge orders her transfer from prison to a psychiatric facility where her case will be reviewed every two years until she is deemed fit to be released.

=== Season 2 (2018) ===
No. overall	No. in season	Title	Directed by	Written by	Original release date	U.S. viewers (millions)
9	1	"Part I"	Antonio Campos	Derek Simonds	August 1, 2018	1.15
Heather Novack is a police detective in Harry Ambrose's home town of Keller in Upstate New York, whose father was friends with Harry. She asks Harry to help investigate a double murder, and Harry returns to Keller after almost 15 years away. A couple was found dead, apparently poisoned, in a motel room—the man is identified as Adam Lowry, but the woman has no ID. Their 13-year-old son, Julian, tells the police they were on their way to Niagara Falls when their car broke down. Harry notices Julian has a rash, and Julian admits he used jimson weed to poison his parents' tea, but will not say why. Harry asks the DA's office for more time before arresting Julian. Police find the car with the mother's wallet, but there is no ID. Harry realizes that there are no children's clothes among the luggage. Julian has been placed in foster care and has flashbacks of a woman, seemingly his therapist. That woman appears in the police station claiming to be Julian's mother.
10	2	"Part II"	Antonio Campos	Ellen Fairey	August 8, 2018	1.10
Vera Walker, who claims to be Julian's mother, says that Adam and Bess (the second victim) lived with her and helped watch Julian and were taking him to Niagara Falls. Heather is shocked to hear that Vera lives at Mosswood Grove, a notorious "utopian" commune near Keller. Flashbacks reveal that Heather and her girlfriend, Marin, snuck onto Mosswood out of curiosity. In the present, Vera visits Julian and whispers intensely in his ear; he changes his story and claims no memory of making the poisoned tea. Vera shows Julian's birth certificate in court, but, with no record of residency, is denied guardianship. After Harry reveals to Julian that he was also in a foster home, Julian shares his nightmares of a hooded figure visiting him. Police search Mosswood, where they learn that Julian was the only child there. Harry deduces that Adam and Bess were actually fleeing from the commune and getting Julian out. Heather spots a ponytailed man she also saw at the motel following the murders. Plagued by memories of Marin going into a large outbuilding on the property, Heather now sneaks into the building and finds a large stone column.
11	3	"Part III"	John David Coles	Bradford Winters	August 15, 2018	1.01
Julian is arrested and sent to a juvenile detention center, awaiting to be tried as an adult for second-degree murder. After Harry tells Vera that Julian will undergo a psychological evaluation, she tells Harry that Adam and Bess abducted Julian and that Julian "defended himself." Julian admits that he liked Bess more but died because she lied, which causes one to be "split in two." Meanwhile, Heather collects a box of Marin's belongings from her mother and finds a book inside with the name "Julian" circled throughout. She deduces that Marin was Julian's biological mother. Heather and Harry talk to Dr. Poole, an obstetrician who signed Julian's birth certificate. Poole tells the Detectives that he needs to retrieve his files. When they go to look for him they find him bleeding from the neck after cutting his own throat. Later, a miniature stone column is found in his attic.
12	4	"Part IV"	Jody Lee Lipes	Jesse McKeown	August 22, 2018	1.09
A journal from Poole's attic bears an emblem, and a passage mentions entering the "labyrinth." Currently institutionalized, a woman is the only connection between Mosswood and Poole through a dropped malpractice lawsuit. She mentions "The Beacon," the founder of Mosswood. Heather's father Jack draws a tattoo that he recalls seeing on Marin's wrist. The tattoo matches the emblem (the labyrinth), which leads Heather to discover "The Beacon" is disgraced psychotherapist Lionel Jeffries and that Marin was present during his group Mosswood meeting. Vera plays Harry a recording of Bess's therapy. He requests a session, and she leads him into the woods but abandons him. He finds her in a cabin that Jeffries once used as an office. Harry's "session" results in him blacking out and waking in the same motel room where the murders occurred.
13	5	"Part V"	Cherien Dabis	Samir Mehta	August 29, 2018	1.14
After learning that he willingly checked himself into the motel, Harry is vague in answering Heather's questions about his visit with Vera. He later breaks into Mosswoodian Glen Fisher's house to find a photo connecting his family to the stone column. At Julian's arraignment, his lawyer enters a not-guilty plea. Julian gets into a fight in jail and is put in isolation, where he tells Harry that his nightmare visitor, two weeks prior, was actually real. Vera later asks Harry to be a material witness for Julian; as a reward, she confirms that she is not Julian's mother. Chief Liddell removes Harry from the seemingly closed case, and Jack later shuns Harry for suspecting a town-wide cover-up. Marin cuts ties with Heather in a flashback, becomes a Mosswood member, and reveals she is pregnant to Vera. Vera tells her that babies cannot be a part of the commune, but Jeffries allows it, just this once.
14	6	"Part VI"	Brad Anderson	Nina Braddock	September 5, 2018	1.13
Harry learns that he is being followed and manages to find the malpractice suit's missing video. He sends a copy to Heather and shows it to Vera, causing her to recall and relate previous Mosswood events. Julian's birth is shown, but he rejects being breastfed by Marin as Vera has also been doing it. Vera realizes the "work" done in the Mosswood sessions are forms of abuse. Jeffries takes Julian from her and retreats to his cabin. In the present, Heather has a dive team to search a lake mentioned in the video; a woman's corpse is found there. Harry forces the DA, who was bribed to bury the malpractice suit, to change Julian's murder charge to manslaughter. Julian is returned to the foster home, and despite Harry's reassurance that the hooded figure is a manifestation of guilt, Julian is later seemingly abducted by it.
15	7	"Part VII"	Tucker Gates	Jesse McKeown	September 12, 2018	1.04
Keller Police raid Mosswood to search for Julian. Concerned for his safety, Vera is confrontational and gets arrested. Harry surmises the cloaked figure has Julian and learns a brown van was parked near the foster home that night. The cloaked figure and van owner is shown to be Marin, who has been living at a convent for the past three years. She had asked Adam and Bess to bring Julian to her at Niagara Falls, but they were murdered. After convincing Julian that she is his mother and armed with a gun, Marin intends to drive him into Canada to meet someone. Harry deduces her crossing point, but he and Heather find her shot dead, and Julian is still missing.
16	8	"Part VIII"	John David Coles	Bradford Winters	September 19, 2018	1.13
Julian is shown in Vera's care in New York City. She tells him of her plan for them to live in Washington State. In Keller, Harry learns of documents of a regular sizeable monthly payment via a shell corporation to Vera at Mosswood over 10 years. Heather finds a motel room key in Jack's laundry at home, the same motel where Marin was shot. Both detectives question Jack, but he refuses to answer with Heather present. He confesses to accidentally shooting Marin with her own gun after she called asking for money and he saw that she was unstable. He also admits to being Julian's father after he raped Marin following her drunken argument with Heather. Julian calls Harry to inform him of Vera's plan; Harry tells him that it is solely his choice to go or stay. Harry traces the call, as Julian tearfully refuses to go with Vera. They are returned to Keller, and Julian's trial resumes. Harry vouches for him, and he is placed in a rehabilitation home for four years. Vera is not charged, and she torches the Mosswood therapy recordings and the barn that houses the stone column. Vera returns Harry's therapy recording to him, wherein Harry admits resentment regarding Vera's close relationship with Julian as he didn't have one with his own mother. Harry and Heather finally take Julian to Niagara Falls.

=== Season 3 (2020) ===
No. overall	No. in season	Title	Directed by	Written by	Original release date	U.S. viewers (millions)
17	1	"Part I"	Adam Bernstein	Derek Simonds	February 6, 2020	0.88
Harry Ambrose is called to the scene of a car accident in which the driver was killed. The driver was Nick Haas, a former college friend of Jamie Burns, a passenger in the car who survived and reported the accident. Nick had unexpectedly visited Jamie and his pregnant wife, Leela, causing discomfort to Jamie. Harry questions Sonya Barzel, who is the only resident on the rural road where the accident occurred. She claims to not know either man, but a flashback reveals Nick was headed to her house and Jamie intentionally caused the accident to prevent it. Nick initially survived, but Jamie delayed calling 9-1-1, hoping their secrets would soon die with Nick.
18	2	"Part II"	Adam Bernstein	Nina Braddock	February 13, 2020	0.70
As Harry and Detective Vic Soto focus on a hand injury that Nick had sustained before the accident, Harry doubts Jamie's statement that Nick's arrival the night of the accident was their first meeting since college. Jamie remembers having dinner with Nick in Manhattan two weeks before and Harry and Vic find video confirming the meeting and of Nick negatively influencing Jamie. The injury occurred when Nick held a knife with Jamie’s hand and stabbed himself. Sonya finds a freshly dug grave on her property and a jacket over the shovel. Harry believes the hole was dug by Jamie, who maintains his clean-cut persona despite having a panic attack and visions of Nick.
19	3	"Part III"	Andrew McCarthy	Hannah Shakespeare	February 20, 2020	0.58
After learning from a former college roommate that Jamie's demeanor changed after befriending Nick, Harry questions those who knew Jamie at the time. A professor states that Jamie and Nick studied Friedrich Nietzsche, in particular his Übermensch concept. Meanwhile, Jamie meets with one of his students, Emma, and tries to dissuade her from continuing her education after high school, in an act of non-conformity. When he has a vision of Nick killing his newborn, Jamie goes to Harry for guidance. Harry takes him in for a psychological evaluation, but Jamie believes it to be a forced confession and escapes.
20	4	"Part IV"	Andrew McCarthy	Jonathan Caren	February 27, 2020	0.55
With Vic tracking Jamie's cell phone, Harry follows Jamie into New York City to monitor his activity. Before reaching him, Jamie meets Sophie, a former student who admits having a crush on him in school and later invites him to a party, with Harry following. She leads him to Kyle, a medium who senses that Nick is still a part of Jamie, who recalls the night of the accident and Nick's intention to bury Sonya alive. More flashbacks show Nick wanting Jamie to kill for sport and live a wild life. After endangering Sophie, Jamie allows Harry to take him home. Harry waits outside for Jamie to tell his wife but falls asleep. The next morning, Harry is called to the scene of Kyle's murder.
21	5	"Part V"	Colin Bucksey	Ahmadu Garba	March 5, 2020	0.66
Jamie had returned to the party to seek out Kyle for a private session. Kyle recited phrases that Nick would use, but refused to elaborate on Jamie's destructive path. Jamie then bludgeoned him to death, went to his school office to clean up and dispose of the bloody evidence, and returned home. Harry later arrives at the crime scene and sees Sophie being questioned by the NYPD. He suggests that Jamie should confess everything and not let anything further be investigated. Jamie refuses and both are questioned. Harry explains to Sonya that she was a random target, but, still fearful, she approaches Leela and relates what Harry has told her about Jamie. Leela kicks Jamie out of the house. Jamie goes to Harry's cabin and provokes an attack in front of Harry's grandson, Eli, seemingly to bring Harry up to the level of disorderly behavior that Nick had instilled in Jamie.
22	6	"Part VI"	Radium Cheung	Julie Siege	March 12, 2020	0.55
After Harry's daughter Melanie restricts him from seeing Eli indefinitely, Harry leaves Jamie an apologetic voicemail. Jamie begins to stalk Harry and Sonya, who have begun dating. Jamie trespasses in and around her home, but, while initially fearful, she takes the opportunity to study him for her art. As Jamie recalls the beginning of his and Nick's friendship, he confesses killing Kyle to Leela, who now doesn't recognize the man she married. He tries to reconnect with her socially, but has another breakdown when shunned in public. He contacts Harry and leads him to the pit that Nick had dug for Sonya. The two men carry wood and a plastic hose, and Harry realizes that this was another test of trust that Jamie and Nick used to do together. Jamie gives a written confession of the two murders to Harry to coax him into participating in the same test, Harry loses a coin toss and goes into the pit. He is buried alive, holding the hose for air; but Jamie removes the hose, leaving Harry gasping for air and hoping he will be unearthed.
23	7	"Part VII"	Rachel Goldberg	Willie Reale	March 19, 2020	0.63
After eight hours, Jamie digs Harry up and takes him to his cabin. As part of the deal, Harry burns the written confession. Jamie believes they are now mentally connected, more than he and Nick were, adding that Nick wanted Jamie to be the one to kill Sonya, forcing Jamie to crash the car and to let his friend die. Jamie leaves, telling Harry to not return to his normal way of life. Harry then retrieves his phone, as he had been secretly recording their conversation. Having Jamie's confession to manslaughter, Harry asks Vic to arrest Jamie for Nick's death. However, Jamie's lawyer persuades a judge to rule the confession inadmissible and releases Jamie, who returns home only to be denied entry. Harry had suggested Leela get a restraining order. Later, she also reports Jamie's confession of Kyle's murder and turns in a sample of his blood that she washed off of Jamie. Now fully unhinged, Jamie stalks and kills Harry's boss.
24	8	"Part VIII"	Derek Simonds	Derek Simonds & Piero S. Iberti	March 26, 2020	0.65
Jamie has become totally unhinged and is planning to kill everyone Harry cares about as a way to bring him to the edge. He fails at killing Sonya, who tries to talk him back to normal. Jamie says a silent goodbye to Leela, both knowing it's the last they'll see each other. At Harry's home, Jamie has kidnapped Eli and threatens to kill him, all while trying to negatively influence Harry. Eli escapes into the woods and Harry follows, having been shot by Jamie with his own gun. Harry is able to hit Jamie with a rock, dazing him, and Harry runs back in the house to get his backup gun out of his safe. Jamie comes back and taunts Harry, saying that he is just like him and always will be. Harry shoots Jamie, who was not attacking him at that moment. Realizing medics are too far away and he is going to die, Jamie suddenly becomes scared of death, wishing he would not die and saying he's not a bad person, while Harry silently regrets what he's done. Harry promises Jamie he is not alone and holds his hand as he dies. Months later, Harry is still traumatized by the events and Sonya asks him what Jamie was like in his final moments, to which Harry replies "scared" and, breaking down into tears, is comforted by Sonya.

=== Season 4 (2021) ===
No. overall	No. in season	Title	Directed by	Written by	Original release date	U.S. viewers (millions)
25	1	"Part I"	Derek Simonds	Derek Simonds & Mia Chung	October 13, 2021	0.38
Still reeling from the Burns case, Harry and Sonya travel to Hanover Island, Maine. Her artist friend, Greta, arranges housing for them in a coastal cabin. Excusing himself from lunch, Harry ventures near a pier and meets Percy Muldoon, who works for her family's fishing company. Percy mentions her connection to nature and that the ocean will soon "speak" to him. Later that night, a restless Harry takes a stroll, hears crying in the woods, and sees a distraught Percy step off a cliff's edge to the ocean below. Police chief Lou Raskin, Percy's grandmother Meg and uncle Colin later arrive on scene; the Muldoons are suspicious of Harry. The next day, Harry returns to the woods, where he previously heard the crying, to find various trinkets, including a piece of knotted rope. He visits the Muldoon fishing company and sees Meg arguing with Mike Lam, an Asian man whom Harry learns owns a rival fishing company. Later, Harry is invited to the Muldoon home, where Meg allows him to search Percy's room. He finds another rope trinket, and Meg says Percy wanted to keep some old rope. Later, while looking at nightly CCTV footage of the pier, Harry sees Percy kneeling before then fleeing a shadowy figure. Harry's fractured mind later shows Percy asking him to find her.
26	2	"Part II"	Adam Bernstein	Jonathan Caren	October 20, 2021	0.43
Percy's car is found, and fingerprints inside lead Harry and Lou to CJ Lam, son of Mike and Stephanie Lam, who initially admits to needing a ride from Percy a few months prior. After seeing a trinket similar to one found with the rope and CJ's car tires with red dirt found only near Percy's car, they make CJ their first suspect. Harry questions the only resident in the vicinity of Percy's car, a drug dealer named Diez, who says CJ was there the night Percy disappeared. This doesn't sit well with Colin Muldoon, who physically intimidates CJ. Admitting to having a wild secret relationship with Percy fueled by drugs, CJ says they struggled the night she disappeared, and she accidentally injured her head, but that they parted ways. Harry and Lou relay this information to Meg, who says she saw Percy's head wound that night. As she drives away, Harry recalls Meg saying she last saw Percy around five that afternoon; Meg is lying.
27	3	"Part III"	Adam Bernstein	Jenny Zhang	October 27, 2021	0.37
Harry secretly follows Meg to the mainland, where he witnesses her receiving an envelope of cash, as well as arguing with a woman outside her home. After Meg leaves, Harry follows up with the woman, who turns out to be Percy's mother. She tells him Percy came to the mainland nine months ago to get away from Meg. Harry later visits Caroline, who was Percy's roommate on the mainland until Percy became spooked one night while clubbing and immediately returned to Meg. Harry and Sonya visit the Muldoon home to ask Meg a few questions and end up staying for dinner. Harry confronts the Muldoons with what he has learned and that he thinks they have been lying to him. After the tense dinner ends, he and Sonya return home separately, where Sean later meets with him and confirms they are lying. Later, a corpse is seen floating facedown close to the beachfront.
28	4	"Part IV"	Radium Cheung	Piero S. Iberti	November 3, 2021	0.41
The corpse is confirmed to be Percy, and the coroner also confirms that there was no foul play. After their home is ransacked, Sonya decides to leave the island, but Harry chooses to stay behind to continue with the investigation. Mike Lam tells Harry that he often saw Colin and Percy going out alone on his boat and suggests that it didn't seem appropriate, but, when Harry confronts Colin about this, he denies it and credibly states that he was trying to instill in her a stronger faith in God. Later, Harry remembers Sonya reading to him about the "Legend of Bazegw," a folktale native to Hanover Island, which Harry now thinks may provide some help in solving the mystery of Percy's death.
29	5	"Part V"	Haifaa Al-Mansour	Kate Roche	November 10, 2021	0.48
Harry discovers Em Castillo's address. He goes to see her, but, when she is not home, he breaks in and finds a notebook with personal details about Percy. Harry returns home to find Em is waiting for him inside his home. Em confides to Harry that Percy asked her for help coping with her life, so Em tried to help her. Percy had told Em about a death that was haunting her, but Percy refused to be specific. Harry later talks to Sonya, who tells him an intruder stole some of her photographs. She has back-ups, and Harry shows some of these photographs to Meg. Meg identifies one of the boats as belonging to Brandon Keyser, one of Percy's ex-boyfriends. When they go to the docks to see Brandon coming in, they find his boat was put on auto-pilot and no one is driving it. Meg and Harry search further and fish out Brandon's body, which has a bullet in his skull.
30	6	"Part VI"	Batán Silva	Gerald Suesta	November 17, 2021	0.46
Because Brandon's murder is so high-profile, the Portland police takes over the investigation. Harry yells at them for focusing on Mike Lam, leading an embarrassed Chief Raskin to boot Harry from the case. Nevertheless, Harry continues the investigation on his own, and finds out that Brandon appeared to be doing some illegal things down by the boatyard. While Harry searches a ship there, two armed men come after him. He hides, knifes one of the men in the leg, and escapes. He is injured, but Meg finds him by the road and takes him to her house. Sean sees them and makes a call, telling the caller that Harry is at their home and asks what should he do next. Meanwhile, the ship is set on fire to destroy evidence.
31	7	"Part VII"	Batán Silva	Mia Chung	November 24, 2021	0.53
Harry visits The Golden Fish restaurant, where Mrs. Lam reveals that one night her husband saw a group of men and women being hurriedly transferred from Brandon's boat to another one. Harry suspects human trafficking, and visits the shop owner who has been making fake ID's for these people. With information from this man and Em, Harry visits the island home of Verne Novak, whom he suspects owns the other boat. A confrontation with Novak ensues, and Harry shoots him. He calls Raskin, but Novak tells Harry that the police can not be trusted on this issue. Harry is arrested and claims Novak murdered Brandon. When the police step away, Harry steals Novak's phone from the evidence area, calls one of the numbers, and realizes policeman Josh is the dirty cop. In a flashback, Percy visits Josh at the police station with her human trafficking theory; but instead of driving her to Chief Raskin, Josh takes her to the Muldoon house, where she is given back to Colin and Sean. Later, Meg cautions Harry about looking into her family.
32	8	"Part VIII"	Monica Raymund	Nina Braddock	December 1, 2021	0.45
Bo Lam, the Lam's oldest son who appears for the first time via flashback, is accidentally shot and killed by Percy, as she tries to break up a fight between Sean and Bo on their boat. In order to keep the Lams quiet, the Muldoons give the Lams one of their fishing permits, as well as a small island where the Lams bury Bo. Harry pieces this all together, and Sean finally admits everything and voluntarily goes to the police to confess. Percy's death is a suicide, as she harbored a deep guilt for what happened to Bo, and he was the mysterious figure she kept "seeing" after his death. Harry is left kneeling at the lip of the cliff from which Percy jumped. He stares seaward after nodding positively to his mind's iteration of Percy's question: "Do you see another way [out of your own grief]?".

== Production ==
=== Development ===
The series, described as a "close-ended series" by the network, was adapted from the novel of the same name by Petra Hammesfahr; however, the book's darker outlook was toned down and the location shifted from Germany to Upstate New York in the United States. It is the first time that Biel has served as an executive producer on a series, a role she said was "gold". Biel stated that she moved into production so that she could develop projects with challenging and interesting roles rather than wait for them to happen.

The series was ordered on January 17, 2017, and the eight episodes were broadcast on USA Network between August 2 and September 20, 2017. Originally, the series was created as a miniseries; however, in March 2018, it was announced that The Sinner would return for a second season. The second season premiered on August 1, 2018, comprised eight episodes and concluded on September 19, 2018. On March 6, 2019, USA Network renewed the series for a third season. which premiered on February 6, 2020. On June 15, 2020, USA renewed the series for a fourth season, which premiered on October 13, 2021. On November 17, 2021, it was reported the fourth season would be its last.

=== Music ===
The main song featured in the first-season storyline is "Huggin and Kissin" by Big Black Delta.

=== Casting ===
In May 2018, Carrie Coon, Natalie Paul and Hannah Gross were cast for the second season as Vera, Heather and Marin respectively. During the third season renewal, it was announced that Matt Bomer would star in the third season. On August 16, 2019, Jessica Hecht, Parisa Fitz-Henley, and Eddie Martinez were cast in starring roles for the third season. On March 17, 2021, Alice Kremelberg was cast for the fourth season as Percy Muldoon, a member of a fishing family who faces a tragedy. On April 21, 2021, Michael Mosley joined the cast as a new series regular for the fourth season. On June 9, 2021, Cindy Cheung, David Huynh, Ronin Wong, and Neal Huff were cast as series regulars for the fourth season.

=== Filming locations ===
The series is primarily filmed in New York state; various towns were used in the first season to depict the fictional Dorchester in New York. The exterior of the Mt. Pleasant Justice Court building in Valhalla, New York, was used for the Dorchester police building.

The fictional Beverwyck Club in the first season was filmed at the Belvedere Estate, a private residence surrounded by forest in Tarrytown, New York. The production used some of the rooms, the basement, the Agora House building, and the wooded area on the property. Some filming for the first season was also completed in Summerville, South Carolina, and in North Charleston, South Carolina. The county jail scenes were filmed at the former county detention center in St. George, South Carolina, 30 miles from Summerville. At that time, the first episode was still considered to be the pilot for the series.

The hamlet of Purchase, New York, was used to film "a sizeable chunk" of the second season; one location is the Cobble Stone Restaurant. The Pier 701 Restaurant & Bar in the village of Piermont, New York, was used for some filming in the first season. Some filming was completed at Prospect Point in Niagara Falls, New York; Bill Pullman was included in those scenes.

In the third season, Dorchester is specified as being "by the Hudson River in Somerset County". The third season was mainly filmed in New York State, especially in the town of Hartsdale, New York, in Westchester County. Some filming for the third season was completed at the Hartsdale train station, rebranded as Dorchester. Crews were also filming in summer 2019 at Hastings-on-Hudson, New York, at the Found Herbal Apothecary Herb shop, and at the Hastings Center Diner. A car chase was shot in Queens, New York, and scenes set at the fictional Briarton school were shot at the Synod of Bishops Russian Church on East 93rd Street. Other New York City locations included the STK Midtown Steakhouse and the City College of New York, both in Manhattan.

The fourth season began filming in late April 2021 in Nova Scotia and wrapped in August 2021. Most of the town and harbor scenes were shot in Lunenburg, Nova Scotia.

== Reception ==
=== Critical response ===
==== Season 1 ====
Critics acclaimed the first season and praised Biel's performance. On the review aggregator website Rotten Tomatoes, the season has an approval rating of 91% based on 41 reviews, with an average rating of 6.6/10. The site's critical consensus reads, "Smartly unpredictable and led by powerful performances from a talented cast, the darkly compelling The Sinner sinks its hooks in fast and doesn't let go." Metacritic, which assigns a rating to reviews, gave the series an average weighted score of 71 out of 100, based on 23 critics, indicating "generally favorable reviews". It was the number one new cable series of 2017, according to Nielsen delayed viewing data.

==== Season 2 ====
A 97% approval rating for the second season was reported by Rotten Tomatoes, with an average rating of 7.54/10 based on 33 reviews, and a critical consensus reading, "In its second season, The Sinner establishes itself as an engrossing why-dunnit thriller series with staying power." Metacritic assigned a score of 75 out of 100 based on 16 critics for the second season, indicating "generally favorable reviews".

Once again praising the writing and performances, several critics noted that the follow-up season surpassed expectations, as star Jessica Biel's character did not return from the first season.

Alex McLevy of The A.V. Club wrote a rave review of the first few episodes, in particular the performance of Carrie Coon as the mysterious Vera Walker. McLevy wrote that the second season could be even better than the first, noting,

"Two things keep it from feeling like a rehash of season one: the excellent choices in new narrative twists made by writer-creator Derek Simonds, and the caliber of talent involved in bringing it to life. Chief among the latter group is Carrie Coon, who ... brings a wonderful fusion of frazzled humanism and sinister duplicity to the part, another magnetic performance by the actor that elevates the material and lends gravitas to some of the more daffily implausible turns."

Ben Travers of indieWire wrote,

"Derek Simonds assembled a helluva team for an intriguing follow-up season. The first three episodes of Season 2 match the tone and intensity of the writer's gripping debut, while new cast members Tracy Letts, Natalie Paul, and Carrie Coon more than make up for any holes left by the original cast. ... Season 2 has enough going on it could spin off the rails, but the mere fact it has so much working for it thus far is a big win for everyone involved. The Sinner is no one-hit wonder."

==== Season 3 ====
On Rotten Tomatoes, the third season has an approval rating of 85% with an average rating of 7.28/10 based on 13 reviews. Metacritic has assigned a score of 81 out of 100 based on five critics for the third season, indicating "universal acclaim".

Season 4

On Rotten Tomatoes, the fourth season has an approval rating of 86% with an average rating of 7.8/10 based on 13 reviews.

=== Ratings ===
Viewership and ratings per season of The Sinner
Season	Timeslot (ET)	Episodes	First aired		Last aired		Avg. viewers (millions)	18–49 rank	Avg. 18–49 rating
Season	Timeslot (ET)	Episodes	Date	Viewers (millions)	Date	Viewers (millions)	Avg. viewers (millions)	18–49 rank	Avg. 18–49 rating
1	Wednesday 10:00 pm	8	August 2, 2017	1.63	September 20, 2017	2.44	1.80	TBD	0.53
2	Wednesday 10:00 pm	8	August 1, 2018	1.15	September 19, 2018	1.13	1.10	TBD	0.28
3	Thursday 9:00 p.m. (1–2); Thursday 10:00 p.m. (3–8)	8	February 6, 2020	0.88	March 26, 2020	0.65	0.65	TBD	0.16
4	Wednesday 10:00 p.m.	8	October 21, 2021	0.38	December 1, 2021	0.45	TBD	TBD	TBD

The Sinner : U.S. viewers per episode (millions)

Season	Episode number								Average
Season	1	2	3	4	5	6	7	8	Average
1	1.63	1.41	1.64	1.76	1.84	1.84	1.84	2.44	1.80
2	1.15	1.10	1.01	1.09	1.14	1.13	1.04	1.13	1.10
3	0.88	0.70	0.58	0.55	0.66	0.55	0.63	0.65	0.65
4	0.38	0.43	0.37	0.41	0.48	0.46	0.53	0.44	TBD

Audience measurement performed by Nielsen Media Research

==== Season 1 ====
Viewership and ratings per episode of The Sinner
No.	Title	Air date	Rating (18–49)	Viewers (millions)	DVR (18–49)	DVR viewers (millions)	Total (18–49)	Total viewers (millions)
1	"Part I"	August 2, 2017	0.4	1.63	0.8	2.35	1.2	3.98
2	"Part II"	August 9, 2017	0.4	1.41	0.9	2.52	1.3	3.93
3	"Part III"	August 16, 2017	0.5	1.64	0.8	2.37	1.3	4.02
4	"Part IV"	August 23, 2017	0.5	1.76	0.9	2.58	1.4	4.34
5	"Part V"	August 30, 2017	0.5	1.84	1.0	2.78	1.5	4.62
6	"Part VI"	September 6, 2017	0.6	1.84	—N/a	—N/a	—N/a	—N/a
7	"Part VII"	September 13, 2017	0.5	1.84	0.8	2.55	1.3	4.39
8	"Part VIII"	September 20, 2017	0.8	2.44	—N/a	—N/a	—N/a	—N/a

==== Season 2 ====
Viewership and ratings per episode of The Sinner
No.	Title	Air date	Rating (18–49)	Viewers (millions)	DVR (18–49)	DVR viewers (millions)	Total (18–49)	Total viewers (millions)
1	"Part I"	August 1, 2018	0.3	1.15	—N/a	—N/a	—N/a	—N/a
2	"Part II"	August 8, 2018	0.3	1.10	—N/a	—N/a	—N/a	—N/a
3	"Part III"	August 15, 2018	0.3	1.01	0.6	1.97	0.9	2.98
4	"Part IV"	August 22, 2018	0.3	1.09	—N/a	—N/a	—N/a	—N/a
5	"Part V"	August 29, 2018	0.3	1.14	0.5	1.75	0.8	2.89
6	"Part VI"	September 5, 2018	0.3	1.13	0.5	1.90	0.8	3.03
7	"Part VII"	September 12, 2018	0.2	1.04	0.5	1.86	0.7	2.91
8	"Part VIII"	September 19, 2018	0.3	1.13	—N/a	—N/a	—N/a	—N/a

==== Season 3 ====
Viewership and ratings per episode of The Sinner
No.	Title	Air date	Rating (18–49)	Viewers (millions)	DVR (18–49)	DVR viewers (millions)	Total (18–49)	Total viewers (millions)
1	"Part I"	February 6, 2020	0.2	0.88	0.3	1.28	0.5	2.16
2	"Part II"	February 13, 2020	0.2	0.70	0.2	1.01	0.4 (Note: Live +7 ratings were not available, so Live +3 ratings have been used instead.)	1.71
3	"Part III"	February 20, 2020	0.2	0.58	0.2	1.13	0.4	1.71
4	"Part IV"	February 27, 2020	0.1	0.55	0.4	1.16	0.5	1.71
5	"Part V"	March 5, 2020	0.2	0.66	0.3	1.18	0.5	1.84
6	"Part VI"	March 12, 2020	0.1	0.55	0.3	1.11	0.4	1.66
7	"Part VII"	March 19, 2020	0.2	0.63	0.2	1.10	0.4	1.72
8	"Part VIII"	March 26, 2020	0.2	0.65	0.2	1.07	0.4	1.72

==== Season 4 ====
Viewership and ratings per episode of The Sinner
No.	Title	Air date	Rating (18–49)	Viewers (millions)	DVR (18–49)	DVR viewers (millions)	Total (18–49)	Total viewers (millions)
1	"Part I"	October 13, 2021	0.1	0.38	0.2	0.86	0.2	1.24
2	"Part II"	October 20, 2021	0.1	0.43	0.2	0.79	0.2	1.22
3	"Part III"	October 27, 2021	0.1	0.37	TBD	TBD	TBD	TBD
4	"Part IV"	November 3, 2021	0.1	0.41	TBD	TBD	TBD	TBD
5	"Part V"	November 10, 2021	0.1	0.48	TBD	TBD	TBD	TBD
6	"Part VI"	November 17, 2021	0.1	0.46	0.1	0.85	0.2	1.31
7	"Part VII"	November 24, 2021	0.1	0.53	0.1	0.86	0.2	1.38
8	"Part VIII"	December 1, 2021	0.1	0.45	0.1	0.81	0.2	1.26

=== Awards and nominations ===
Year	Ceremony	Category	Nominee(s)	Result	Ref.
2018	Critics' Choice Television Awards	Best Actor in a Movie/Miniseries	Bill Pullman	Nominated	
2018	Critics' Choice Television Awards	Best Actress in a Movie/Miniseries	Jessica Biel	Nominated	
2018	Golden Globe Awards	Best Miniseries or Television Film	The Sinner	Nominated	
2018	Golden Globe Awards	Best Actress – Miniseries or Television Film	Jessica Biel	Nominated	
2018	People's Choice Awards	The Bingeworthy Show of 2018	The Sinner	Nominated	
2018	Primetime Emmy Awards	Outstanding Lead Actress in a Limited Series or Movie	Jessica Biel	Nominated	
2018	Saturn Awards	Best Television Presentation	The Sinner	Nominated	
2019	Saturn Awards	Best Action-Thriller Television Series	The Sinner	Nominated	
2019	Saturn Awards	Best Actor on Television	Bill Pullman	Nominated	
2019	Screen Actors Guild Awards	Outstanding Performance by a Male Actor in a Miniseries or Television Movie	Bill Pullman	Nominated	
2022	Hollywood Critics Association TV Awards	Best Actor in a Broadcast Network or Cable Limited or Anthology Series	Bill Pullman	Nominated	
