= Meghana =

- Village
- Location in Rajasthan, India Meghana (India)
- Coordinates: 28°59′08″N 74°50′15″E
- Country: India
- State: Rajasthan
- District: Hanumangarh

Population (2011)
  - Total: 3,246
- Time zone: UTC+5:30 (IST)
- Pincode: 335523
- Vehicle registration: RJ 49

Meghana is a village panchayat in the Nohar tahsil Hanumangarh district of Rajasthan state, India.

== Description ==
Meghana is a panchayat with two villages Durjana, and second Meghana itself is a panchayat. Meghana is named after Megh Singh. Megh Singh was the son of Bagh Singh who was baron of Bikaner king Ganga Singh. Megh Singh colonise a Barton. Later this Barton called Meghana after the name of him. And most of the rajputs of Meghana are called bagawat because they are descendants of Bagh singh.

- Megana has a forest department and land is almost 500 bigha. Meghana is divided in three parts. First and main part is called Meghana. Second part is located on the other hand of the Nohar Sahawa Road and it is called Lakhwali. Third part is located on Meghana Bhanguli road 1 km from main village.
- No railway line in Meghana, but the nearest railway station to Meghana is Nohar about 25 km away.
- There is a govt hospital. PHC Meghana has needful medical facilities including 104 ambulance service.

== Education ==
There is one Government senior school and two private schools in Meghana.

Schools
School	Distance
Govt.Sr.sec.school Meghana	0.0 km
Bhasakar public Mid School Meghana	0.0 km
Ch. Kumbharam arya S.S. S. Meghana	0.0 km
