= Silver Screen Pictures =

Australian film production company

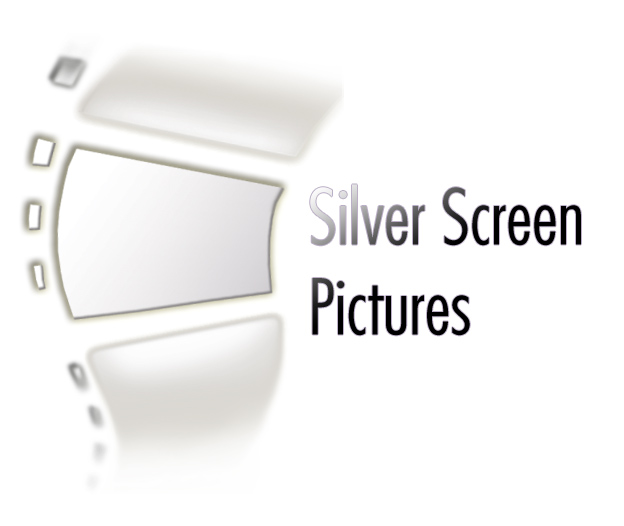
Silver Screen Pictures logo

Silver Screen Pictures is a film, media and production company first established in 2004 under the original name Silver Screen Productions before registering as Australian business Silver Screen Pictures in 2006. The company was first established in Brisbane, Australia by director Alex Barnes, and later partnered with by his producer, Justin Morrissey, in early 2009. The company predominantly produces music videos, and corporate and documentary productions.

== Not A Willing Participant ==
Silver Screen Pictures first major international production was the 27-minute documentary "Not A Willing Participant", 2009, about Australian Indigenous artist Vernon Ah Kee and his journey to represent Australia at the 53rd Venice Biennale of Art. The film premiered in Utah, USA at the Slamdance Film Festival, and later screened on the ABC (Australian Broadcasting Corporation) in 2010. "Not A Willing Participant" has also screened on Qantas inflight entertainment and at the 2010 Dungog Film Festival.
