= Dianne =

Dianne may refer to:

== People ==
- Dianne Alagich (born 1979), Australian soccer player
- Dianne Barnes (born 1958), Australian para-equestrian
- Dianne Barr (born 1972), British swimmer
- Dianne Bates (born 1948), Australian writer and teacher
- Dianne Beevers (born 1946), Australian sculptor and artist
- Dianne Bentley, former First Lady of Alabama
- Dianne Berry, British psychologist and academic
- Dianne Bevelander (1959–2021), South African academic
- Dianne Bos, Canadian photographer
- Dianne Brill, American fashion designer
- Dianne Brooks (1939–2005), American jazz musician
- Dianne Brunton, New Zealand ecology researcher
- Dianne Brushett (1942–2017), Canadian politician
- Dianne Buckner, Canadian television journalist
- Dianne Burge (1953–2024), Australian sprinter
- Dianne Buswell (born 1989), Australian ballroom dancer
- Dianne Byrum (born 1954), American politician
- Dianne Cagen, West Indian cricketer
- Dianne Chai (born 1962), American musician
- Dianne Chambless (1948–2023), American clinical psychologist
- Dianne Chandler (born 1946), Canadian model
- Dianne Cohler-Esses, Syrian rabbi
- Dianne Crittenden (1941–2024), American casting director
- Dianne Cunningham (born 1939), Canadian politician
- Dianne de Leeuw (born 1955), Dutch figure skater and coach
- Dianne dela Fuente (born 1981), Filipino actor and singer
- Dianne DeNecochea (born 1967), American beach volleyball player
- Dianne Doan (born 1990), Canadian actress
- Dianne Dorland, American chemical engineer
- Dianne Durham (1968–2021), American gymnast
- Dianne Edwards (born 1942), Welsh paleobotanist
- Dianne Evers (born 1956), Australian tennis player
- Dianne Feinstein (1933–2023), American politician
- Dianne Foster (1928–2019), Canadian actress
- Dianne Fromholtz (born 1956), Australian tennis player
- Dianne Gaines, American attorney and civic activist
- Dianne Gerace (born 1943), Canadian pentathlete, high and long jumper
- Dianne van Giersbergen (born 1985), Dutch singer
- DiAnne Gove (born 1951), member of the New Jersey General Assembly
- Dianne Guise (born 1952), Australian politician
- Dianne Hadden (born 1951), Australian politician
- Dianne Hamilton (1934–2021), American politician
- Dianne Hansford, American computer scientist
- Dianne F. Harrison, American academic administrator
- Dianne Hart (born 1955), American physician
- Dianne Haskett (born 1955), Canadian politician
- Dianne Hayter (born 1949), British politician and member of the House of Lords
- Dianne Heatherington (1948–1996), Canadian actor and singer
- Dianne Herrin (born 1961), American politician
- Dianne Hesselbein (born 1971), American politician
- Dianne Hiles, Australian politician
- Dianne Hollands (born 1983), New Zealand tennis player
- Dianne Holum (born 1951), American speed skater
- Dianne Houston (born 1954), American screenwriter, director and producer
- Dianne Hull (born 1949), American actress
- Dianne Jackson (1941–1992), British film director
- Dianne Kahura (born 1969), New Zealand rugby union player
- Dianne Kay (born 1954), American actress
- Dianne Kirksey (1950–2020), African-American filmmaker, writer, producer and actress
- Dianne Kohler Barnard (born 1955), South African politician
- Dianne Kornberg (born 1945), American artist
- Dianne L'Ami (born 1976), New Zealand basketball player
- Dianne Lee, British singer and actress
- Dianne Leigh, Canadian singer
- Dianne Macaskill, New Zealand public servant
- Dianne Matias (born 1985), Filipino-American tennis player
- Dianne McIntyre (born 1946), American dancer, choreographer and teacher
- Dianne B. McKay, American immunologist
- Dianne Medina (born 1986), Filipino actress
- Dianne Mirosh, Canadian politician
- Dianne Morales (born 1967), American non-profit executive and political candidate
- Dianne Necio (born 1992), Filipino beauty titleholder
- Dianne Nelmes (born 1951), British former television executive
- Dianne Nelson (born 1954), American short story writer
- Dianne Newman, American microbiologist
- Dianne Norman (born 1971), Canadian basketball player
- Dianne Odell (1947–2008), American polio sufferer
- Dianne P. O'Leary (born 1951), American mathematician
- Dianne Oxberry (1967–2019), English broadcaster and meteorologist
- Dianne Ruth Pettis (1955–2008), New Zealand novelist and journalist
- Dianne H. Pilgrim (1941–2019), American art historian and museum director
- Dianne Pilkington (born 1975), English theatre actress and singer
- Dianne Pinderhughes (born 1947), American political scientist
- Dianne Poole (born 1949), Canadian social worker and law clerk
- Dianne Primavera (born 1950), American politician
- Dianne K. Prinz (1938–2002), American scientist
- Dianne Quander (born 1947), American songwriter
- Dianne Goolkasian Rahbee (born 1938), American classical composer
- Dianne Reeves (born 1956), American jazz singer
- Dianne Reilly (born 1969), Australian politician
- Dianne Renwick (born 1960), American lawyer
- Dianne Marie Bonifacio Romana (born 1984), known as Dimples Romana, Filipina actress and host
- Dianne Saxe (born 1952), Canadian lawyer and politician
- Dianne Schuett, American politician
- Dianne Sika-Paotonu, New Zealand immunologist
- Dianne Smith, American artist
- Dianne Stewart, several people
- Dianne Boardley Suber, American academic administrator
- Dianne Thompson (born 1950), British businesswoman
- Dianne Thorley (born 1949), Australian mayor
- Dianne Tracey, New Zealand marine biologist
- Dianne Van Rensburg (born 1968), South African tennis player
- Dianne Walker (born 1951), American dancer
- Dianne Warren (born 1950), Canadian author
- Dianne Watts (born 1959), Canadian politician
- Dianne Webster, New Zealand pediatrician
- Dianne Welsh, professor of entrepreneurship
- Dianne Whalen (1951–2010), Canadian politician
- Dianne Wiest (born 1948), American actress
- Dianne Wilkerson (born 1955), American politician
- Dianne Wilkinson (1944–2021), American singer-songwriter
- Dianne Willcocks (born 1945), British social scientist
- Dianne Wolfer (born 1961), Australian children's author
- Dianne Woody (died 2016), Washington State politician
- Dianne Yates (born 1943), New Zealand politician
- Dianne Yerbury (born 1941), Australian academic
- Dianne Zorn (born 1956), New Zealand athlete
- Karen Dianne Baldwin (born 1963), Canadian model
- Sandra Dianne (1994–2020), Malaysian singer-songwriter

== Television ==
- Dianne (TV series), a 1971 Canadian television series

== See also ==
- Diane (disambiguation)
- Dian (disambiguation)
- Di (disambiguation)
- Diana (disambiguation)
