= Diana =

Diana most commonly refers to:

- Diana (given name), given name (including a list of people with the name)
- Diana (mythology), ancient Roman goddess of the hunt and wild animals; later associated with the Moon
- Diana, Princess of Wales (1961–1997), formerly Lady Diana Spencer, activist, philanthropist, and member of the British royal family

Diana may also refer to:

== Places and jurisdictions ==
=== Africa ===
- Diana (see), a town and commune in Souk Ahras Province in north-eastern Algeria
- Diana's Peak, the highest point on the island of Saint Helena
- Diana Region, a region in Madagascar
- Diana Veteranorum, an ancient city, former bishopric and present Latin Catholic titular see in Algeria

=== Asia ===
- Diana, Iraq, a town in Iraqi Kurdistan

=== Europe ===
- Diana (Rozvadov), an almost abandoned settlement in the Czech Republic
- Diana, Silesian Voivodeship, a village in south Poland
- Diana Fort, an ancient Roman castrum in Serbia
- Diana Park, a small park in Helsinki, Finland
- Diana Strait, a strait in the Kuril Islands, Russia
- Diana, a Roman fort in the Serbian city of Golubac

=== North America ===
- Diana, New York, a town in Lewis County, New York, United States
- Diana, Saskatchewan, a ghost town in Canada

== Astronomy ==
- 78 Diana, an asteroid
- Diana (crater), a crater on the Moon

== Media ==
=== Books and comics ===
- Diana (pastoral romance), a 1559 text by Jorge de Montemayor
- Diana (Sailor Moon), the future daughter of Artemis and Luna, good friends with Pluto and Chibiusa; named for the goddess
- Wonder Woman's real name, despite having more to do with Greek than Roman mythology
- Diana, a British comics series targeted at young girls, published by DC Thomson from 1963 to 1976

=== Film ===
- 4 Hearts, a 2008 Portuguese film developed under the title Diana
- Diana (2013 film), a British film about Diana, Princess of Wales
- Diana (2018 film), a Spanish psychological thriller
- Diana (Lights Out), a character in the 2013 and 2016 films
- Diana "Dayan", a fictional dayan (Indian witch) in the 2013 Indian film Ek Thi Dayan, Diana being a word play on dayan

=== Television ===
- Diana (American TV series), a 1973–1974 sitcom starring Diana Rigg
- Diana (British TV series), a 1984 drama starring Patsy Kensit and Jenny Seagrove
- "Diana" (Spooks), 2005, final episode of the 4th series of Spooks, concerning the former Princess of Wales

=== Theatre ===
- Diana (musical), a 2019 musical based on the life of Princess Diana

=== Music ===
- Diana (band), a rock group from Toronto, Canada

==== Albums ====
- Diana!, a 1971 Diana Ross TV special, also released as live album
- Diana (album), a 1980 Chic-produced album by Diana Ross

==== Songs ====
- "Diana" (Paul Anka song), 1957
- "Diana", a single by Comus from their 1971 album First Utterance
- "Diana", a song by Wayne Shorter from Herbie Hancock's 1977 album Tempest in the Colosseum
- "Diana" (Bryan Adams song), 1984
- "Diana" (One Direction song), 2013
- "Diana" (Pop Smoke song), 2020
- "What Have You Got Planned Tonight, Diana" or just "Diana", Merle Haggard and The Strangers from the 1976 album The Roots of My Raising

=== Paintings ===
- Diana (Renoir painting), an 1867 painting
- Diana (Vouet), a 1637 painting

=== Sculptures ===
- Diana (Felderhoff), an 1898 bronze sculpture in Berlin, Germany
- Diana (Saint-Gaudens), an 1893 statue, a former New York City landmark
- Diana (Wiken), a public art work in Milwaukee, Wisconsin
- Diana of Versailles

== Technology ==
- Defence Innovation Accelerator for the North Atlantic (DIANA), a NATO organization aiming of facilitate the development of dual-use technologies
- Diana (agricultural machinery), a Greek truck and tractor brand
- Diana (camera), an inexpensive toy box camera popular with art photographers
- DIANA (intermediate language), an IDL-based data structure used in Ada compilers and within the PL/SQL runtime system
- Diana (locomotive), a steam locomotive
- DIANA FEA, a Finite Element Analysis (FEA) solver
- DIANA Mayer & Grammelspacher, a German airgun manufacturer
- Diana Motors Company, a Vintage Era automobile company
- DIANA (DIvisive ANAlysis), a divisive clustering algorithm

== Other uses ==
- Diana (ship), a list of ships with the name
- Diana (swimwear), a swimwear manufacturer
- Diana monkey, a West African member of the Old World monkey superfamily or Cercopithecidae
- Democratic Renewal (DIANA), a political party in Greece

== See also ==
- Charles and Diana (disambiguation)
- Diana Department Store, a chain of department stores in southern Thailand
- Diane (disambiguation)
- Dianism, a form of coitus reservatus which can feature in sex magick
