= James Washington =

James Washington may refer to:

- James Augustus Washington (1831–1911), Confederate colonel during the American Civil War
- James H. Washington (1850–1916), Texas politician
- James W. Washington Jr. (1908–2000), African-American painter and sculptor
- James A. Washington Jr. (1915–1998), judge of the Superior Court for the District of Columbia
- Jim Washington (born 1943), American basketball player
- James Melvin Washington (1948–1997), African-American historian, educator, and minister
- Jim Washington (Canadian football) (1951–2018), Canadian football player
- James Washington (safety) (born 1965), American football player for the UCLA Bruins and in the NFL
- Jim Beanz (James David Washington, born 1980), American music producer
- James Washington (wide receiver) (born 1996), American football player

== See also ==
- James Washington Logue (1863–1925), American politician
- James Washington Lonoikauoalii McGuire (1862–1941), royal courtier of the Hawaiian Kingdom
- James Washington Watts (born 1960), American professor of religion
