= Diann =

Diann is a feminine given name and may refer to:

- Diann Blakely (1957–2014), American poet, essayist, and reviewer
- Diann Burns (born 1956), the first African-American woman to anchor the prime time news in Chicago
- Diann Roffe (born 1967), American alpine skier, Olympic Gold Medallist at the 1994 Lillehammer Olympics
- Diann Shipione, former trustee of the San Diego, California City Employees' Retirement System pension board

== See also ==
- Dian (disambiguation)
- Dianne (disambiguation)
