= Lady Di (disambiguation) =

Lady Di (Diana Frances; 1961–1997) was the first wife of Prince Charles (later Charles III) and mother of Prince William.

Lady Di may also refer to:

== People ==
- Lady Diana Beauclerk (1734–1808), English artist also known as Lady Di
- Dianne Walker (born 1951), American dancer also known as Lady Di

== Fashion ==
- "Lady Di", a pink tricorne hat style made famous by John Boyd in 1981
- Pageboy, a hairstyle that was called "Lady Di" in the United Kingdom in the 1970s and 1980s

== Fictional characters ==
- Lady Di, a character in the film Carandiru, 2003
- Lady Di, a character in the film The Zero Hour, 2010
- Lady Di (EastEnders), a pet bulldog, 2013

== Music ==
- "Lady Di", a composition by Jim Ferguson
- "Lady Di", a Melody Grand Prix entry song by Inger Lise Rypdal, 1982

== See also ==
- Di (disambiguation)
- Diana Spencer (disambiguation)
- Lady Dai (c. 217 BCE – 169 or 168 BCE), Chinese noblewoman
- Lady Di of Ameter, the wife of Sir Cumference in the namesake Sir Cumference book series
- Lady Di Sartoris, the heroine in The Whip (play), 1909
- People's Princess (disambiguation)
- Princess Diana (disambiguation)
