= Princess Diana (disambiguation) =

Princess Diana (Diana Frances; 1961–1997) was the first wife of Prince Charles (later Charles III) and mother of Prince William.

Princess Diana or Princess Diane may also refer to:

== People ==
- Princess Diana of Bourbon-Parma (1932–2020), French aristocrat
- Diane, Duchess of Württemberg (née Princess Diane of Orléans; born 1940), German artist
- Diana Álvares Pereira de Melo, 11th Duchess of Cadaval (born 1978), Portuguese author and French princess by marriage

== Arts and entertainment ==
- "Princess Diana" (song), by Ice Spice and Nicki Minaj, 2023
- Wonder Woman, a DC Comics superheroine also known as Princess Diana of Themyscira

== See also ==
- Charles and Diana (disambiguation)
- Diana (disambiguation)
- Diana Spencer (disambiguation)
- Diane von Fürstenberg (born 1946), Belgian fashion designer and formerly married to Prince Egon von Fürstenberg
- Lady Di (disambiguation)
- People's Princess (disambiguation)
- Princess Diana Memorial, Vienna, Austria
- Princess Diana's Revenge, by Michael de Larrabeiti, 2006
- "Princess Die", a song by Lady Gaga, 2012
