= Di =

Di or DI may refer to:

== Arts and media ==
=== Music ===
- Di, a tone in the solfège ascending chromatic scale existing between Do and Re
- dizi (instrument) or di, a Chinese transverse flute
- D.I. (band), a punk band from Southern California
  - D.I. (EP), a 1983 EP by the same band above

=== Other media ===
- The D.I., 1957 military film by Jack Webb
- Dagens Industri, a Swedish financial newspaper
- DI.FM, an internet radio service

== Businesses and organisations ==
- Defence Intelligence, a UK military intelligence agency
- Defensa Interior, an anti-Franco militant anarchist group in 1960s Spain
- Deseret Industries, an LDS thrift store
- Desert Inn, a former casino in Las Vegas
- Direction Italy, a liberal-conservative political party in Italy
- Dirgantara Indonesia, an Indonesian aircraft company
- Discovery Institute, an intelligent design advocacy group
- Marabu (airline) (IATA code: DI), an Estonian leisure airline
- Norwegian Air UK (former IATA code: DI), a former UK airline
- DBA (airline) (former IATA code: DI), a former German low-cost airline
- DynCorp International, a major United States defense contractor
- Myanmar Directorate of Defence Industries

== Education ==
- Diplomi-insinööri, a Finnish 6-year engineering degree
- Direct instruction, an instructional method focused on a systematic curriculum design

== Natural sciences ==
- Di, a prefix used in organic chemistry nomenclature
- Didymium, a mixture of the elements praseodymium and neodymium once thought to be an element
- Diopside, a clinopyroxene mineral
- Band 3, a protein
- Deionized water, a type of water deprived of the dissolved impurities of ionic nature
- Diabetes insipidus, a disease
- Iodothyronine deiodinase type I, one of a subfamily of enzymes important in the activation and deactivation of thyroid hormones
- Dentinogenesis imperfecta, a genetic disorder of tooth development
- Dī (氐) or Root, a Chinese constellation
- Dì (帝), the Chinese name of the star Kochab

== People ==
=== Ethnic groups ===
- Di (Five Barbarians) (氐), an ethnic group that overran northern China during the Sixteen Kingdoms period
- Beidi or Northern Di (狄), ethnic groups living in northern China during the Zhou Dynasty

=== Individuals ===
- Di (surname) (狄), a Chinese surname sometimes also romanized Dee, particularly:
  - Di Renjie a Tang-dynasty official later fictionalized in a series of Chinese detective stories
- A diminutive form of the names:
  - Diana (given name)
  - Diane (disambiguation)
  - Dianne (disambiguation)
- Diana, Princess of Wales (1961–1997), commonly known as Princess Di or Lady Di

== Technology ==
- Digital intermediate, a filmmaking post-production process
- Dependency injection, a method of decoupling components in software
- DI unit or Direct Input box, an audio device used with PA systems and in sound recording studios
- DI register, or destination index, in x86 computer architecture
- Direction indicator, an instrument in aviation also known as a heading indicator
- Direct ignition, see Distributor § Direct ignition
- Direct injection, a type of fuel injection

== Religion ==
- di (帝), a Chinese word employed in
  - the temple names of deified Chinese emperors
  - Shangdi (Chinese: 上帝, lit. "Lord on High"), the Chinese name for the supreme sky god either in native Chinese beliefs or in translation of monotheistic faiths like Christianity and Islam
- di (Chinese concept) (地), the concept of "earth" in traditional Chinese cosmologies
- di, an irregular Latin masculine plural of deus ("god", "deity")

== Other uses ==
- Detective inspector (DI), a rank in certain police forces
- Di (cuneiform), an ancient written sign
- Diameter, the distance across the middle of a circle
- Di Department, one of the eight departments of the Sourou Province in Burkina Faso
- 501 (number) in Roman numerals
- Disability insurance, a form of insurance that insures the beneficiary's earned income against the risk that a disability will make working uncomfortable
- Hong Kong Document of Identity, issued by the Hong Kong Immigration Department
- Drill instructor, a non-commissioned officer in many military or police forces
- Differentiated integration, a mechanism for the European Union's countries to opt out of EU policies

== See also ==
- Lady Di (disambiguation)
- Die (disambiguation)
