= Dian =

Dian may refer to:

== Places ==
- Dian Kingdom, ancient kingdom in modern Yunnan province, China
- Diān (滇), an official abbreviation for Yunnan province
- Lake Dian, a lake in Yunnan
- Dian, Armenia, a village

== People ==
- Dian (given name), a list
- Dian (surname), a list

== See also ==
- Diane (disambiguation), a given name
- Dianne (disambiguation), a given name
