= Diane =

Diane may refer to:

== People ==
- Diane (given name)

== Film ==
- Diane (1929 film), a German silent film
- Diane (1956 film), a historical drama film starring Lana Turner
- Diane (2017 film), a mystery film directed by Michael Mongillo
- Diane (2018 film), a drama film starring Mary Kay Place

== Music ==
- "Diane" (Golden Gate song), 1970
- Diane (album), by Chet Baker and Paul Bley, 1985
- "Diane" (Cam song), 2017
- "Diane" (Erno Rapee and Lew Pollack song), a 1927 composition covered by many, including a 1964 UK #1 by The Bachelors
- "Diane", a song by Art Pepper from The Art Pepper Quartet
- "Diane" (Hüsker Dü song), 1983
- "Diane", a song by Guster from Keep It Together
- "Diane", a song by Don Patterson with Sonny Stitt and Billy James from The Boss Men

== Other uses ==
- Diana (mythology), a name of the deity Artemis
- The Dianne, a high-rise residential building in Portland, Oregon, US
- Ethinylestradiol/cyproterone acetate, a birth control pill sold under the brand names Diane and Diane-35
- Group Diane, a former special forces unit of the Belgian gendarmerie
- Hurricane Diane, a disastrous Atlantic hurricane during 1955
- Project DIANE, the Diversified Information and Assistance NEtwork, a U.S. videoconferencing based community service network
- Steak Diane, a culinary dish
- Diane, a sin from The Seven Deadly Sins (2014 TV series)

== See also ==
- "Oh Diane", a 1982 song by Fleetwood Mac
- Citroën Dyane, a car
- Daiane, a Portuguese feminine given name
- Dian (disambiguation)
- Diana (disambiguation)
- Dianne (disambiguation)
- Dyane, a town in India
