= Stephen D. Glazier =

American anthropologist

Stephen D. Glazier (born Mystic, Connecticut) is an American anthropologist who specializes in comparative religion. Currently, he is a Senior Research Anthropologist at the Human Relations Area Files at Yale University. Since 1976, Glazier has conducted ethnographic fieldwork on the Caribbean island of Trinidad focusing on the Spiritual Baptists, Orisa, and Rastafari. He also publishes on Caribbean archaeology and prehistory. Glazier cataloged Irving Rouse's St. Joseph (Trinidad) and Mayo (Trinidad) collections for the Peabody Museum of Natural History. In 2017, Glazier retired as professor of Anthropology and Graduate Faculty Fellow at the University of Nebraska–Lincoln, where he taught classes in general (four-field) anthropology, race and minority relations, and a graduate seminar on the anthropology of belief systems.

Glazier began studies in anthropology at Princeton University under Martin G. Silverman, Benjamin Ray, Hildred Geertz, Alfonso Ortiz, and Vincent Crapanzano. He earned his MA (1976) and a Ph.D. (1981) in Anthropology from the University of Connecticut. His dissertation advisors at UConn were Seth Leacock, Dennison J. Nash, and Ronald M. Wintrob.

In 1974, he earned an M.Div. from Princeton Theological Seminary. His M. Div. thesis, "Schizophrenic Speech: A Typology," – directed by James Loder, Vincent Crapanzano, and Hildred Geertz – was based on experiences as an Assistant Chaplain at New Jersey Neuro Psychiatric Institute. In 2021, Glazier was awarded the STM (Master of Sacred Theology) degree from Yale University for a thesis addressing the rhetorical techniques of 18th-century theologians Isaac Backus and Jonathan Edwards.

Glazier was a lecturer in anthropology at the University of Connecticut (Storrs); Visiting associate professor of Intercultural Studies at Trinity College (Hartford); lecturer in anthropology at Connecticut College (New London); Associate Professor of Sociology at Westmont College (Santa Barbara), and Professor of Anthropology at the University of Nebraska–Lincoln. He served as book review editor of the journal Anthropology of Consciousness and was a member of the editorial board of the Journal of the Virgin Island Archaeological Society. Currently, he is a member of the editorial advisory boards of the journals Open Theology and Penteco Studies. He served two terms as president of the Society for the Anthropology of Consciousness. In addition, he served as vice president and secretary of the Society for the Anthropology of Religion and as a council member and as secretary of the Society for the Scientific Study of Religion.

In 1977, Stephen D. Glazier married Rosemary Fitzgerald Custer. The Glaziers have one daughter and four grandchildren.

== Select bibliography ==
=== Books ===
- Stephen D. Glazier and Charles A. Flowerday, editors. 2003. Selected Readings in the Anthropology of Religion: Theoretical and Methodological Essays. Westport, CT: Praeger.
- Andrew S. Buckser and Stephen D. Glazier, editors. 2003. The Anthropology of Religious Conversion. Lanham, MD: Rowman and Littlefield.
- Stephen D. Glazier, general editor. 2001. The Encyclopedia of African and African American Religions New York and London: Routledge.
- Stephen D. Glazier, editor. 1999. Anthropology of Religion: A Handbook. Westport, CT: Praeger.
- Stephen D. Glazier. 1991. Marchin' the Pilgrims Home: A Study of Spiritual Baptists of Trinidad. Salem, WI: Sheffield Publishing
- Stephen D. Glazier, editor. 1985. Caribbean Ethnicity Revisited. New York and London: Gordon and Breach.
- Stephen D. Glazier. 1984. "Organizacion social y economica de los Baptistas Espirituales con atencion especial a sus misiones en Venezuela." Translated by Angelina Pollack-Eltz. Revista Montalban 15: 5–41.
- Stephen D. Glazier, editor. 1980. Perspectives on Pentecostalism: Case Studies from the Caribbean and Latin America. Lanham, MD: University Press of America

=== STM Thesis ===
- Stephen D. Glazier. 2021. "Jonathan Edwards and Isaac Backus on Freedom of the Will." Unpublished STM Thesis, Yale University. Advisors: Kenneth P. Minkema, Harry S. Stout, and Jennifer A. Herdt. This thesis examined the language of Jonathan Edwards and Isaac Backus (1724–1806) and provides a comparison of Edwards's and Backus's ideas concerning Liberty and Freedom from the perspective of Kenneth Burke's A Grammar of Motives.

=== Music recording ===
- Stephen D. Glazier 1980. Spiritual Baptist Music of Trinidad; Recorded in Trinidad by Stephen D. Glazier. FE 4234. New York: Folkways Record and Service Corp. (Re-issued in 1991 by The Smithsonian Institution).

=== Conference Papers ===
- Stephen D. Glazier. 2022. "Barefoot Pilgrims in Cyberspace: Lough Derg Pilgrimage from Cave, to Island, to Internet." <https://cgscholar.com/cg_event/events/N22/proposal/58867> <https://docs.google.com/presentation/d/1GLvL-BatNxn-QHPaPiivCn1tN2TCxilF/edit#slide=id.p1>
- Stephen D. Glazier. 2025. "Disambiguating Babalu-Aye's Efficacy as Healer and Sender of Disease" 24th Annual Austin Africa Conference: Health and Illness in Africa and the African Diaspora. <http://doi:10.20944/preprints202508.1189.v2>

=== Articles, Chapters, Reviews ===
- Stephen D. Glazier. in press. "Review of: "Experiments with Power: Obeah and the Re-Making of Religion in Trinidad, by J. Brent Crosson; Obeah, Orisa & Religious identity in Trinidad, vol. I, by Tracey E. Hucks; Obeah, Orisa & Religious Identity in Trinidad, vol. II, by Dianne M. Stewart." Religion.
- Stephen D. Glazier. 2026. "Review of: How Uruguay Became a ‘Religious Ghetto’: A Deviant Case Study Explains Secularization in Modernity," by Stephen Armet. Religion.
- Stephen D. Glazier. 2026. "Òrìṣà in Diaspora" The Palgrave Handbook of the Yorùbá and Their History. Toyin Falola and Oluwafunminiyi Wasiu Raheem, editors. New York and London: Palgrave. {DOI:10.1007/978-3-032-43715-0}.
- Stephen D. Glazier. 2024. "Making Caribbean Religious Musics." Oxford Handbook of Caribbean Religions. Michelle Gonzalez Maldonado, editor. New York: Oxford University Press, pp. 421–441
- Stephen D. Glazier. 2023. "Vincent Crapanzano" Oxford Bibliographies in Anthropology. John L. Jackson, ed. New York: Oxford University Press. [DOI:10.1093/OBO/9780199766567-0283]
- Stephen D. Glazier. 2021. "Review of: 'Obeah, Race and Racism: Caribbean Witchcraft in the English Imagination,' by Eugenia O'Neal." Choice 58 (6) [choiceconnect.org/review/magprint/220701]
- Stephen D. Glazier. 2021. "Isaac Backus" In Isaac Backus Archives at Special Collections, Yale Divinity School, Box 9, 1771–1774, May 10, 2021. DOI: 10.13140/RG.2.2.24190.92487
- Stephen D. Glazier. 2021. "Passages and Afterworlds: Anthropological Perspectives on Death in the Caribbean, edited by Maarit Forde and Yanique Hume." Religion 51(1):144-47. [doi.org/10.1080/0048721X.2020.1826873]
- Stephen D. Glazier. 2020. "Edith L. B. Turner." In Oxford Bibliographies in Anthropology. John L. Jackson, ed. New York: Oxford University Press.
- Stephen D. Glazier and Carol R. Ember. 2018. "Religion" in C. R. Ember, editor and compiler. Explaining Human Culture. New Haven, CT: Human Relations Area Files
- Stephen D. Glazier. 2018. "From Dissection to Discernment: Edie Turner, Victor Turner and Jonathan Edwards on the Ontological Status of Spirits." The Intellectual Legacy of Victor and Edith Turner. Frank A. Salamone and Marjorie M. Snipes, editors. Lanham, MD: Lexington Books, pp. 35–53.
- Stephen D. Glazier. 2018. "An Ethnography of a Vodu Shrine in Southern Togo: Of Spirit, Slave and Sea," by Eric J. Montgomery and Christian N. Vannier. Religion 48(4): 734–737.
- Stephen D. Glazier. 2018. "Edith L. B. Turner (1921–2016)." American Anthropologist 120 (1): 186–189.
- Stephen D. Glazier. 2017. "World Rastafarianism and Challenges to the Status of the Rasta Woman." Chapter 12. Religious Encounters in Transcultural Society. David W. Kim, editor. Lanham. MD: Lexington Books, pp 223–238.
- Stephen D. Glazier. 2017. "Dreams and Dream Interpretations." Culture and Customs of the Yoruba. edited by Toyin Falola and Akintunder Akinyemi. Austin, TX and Ibadan, Nigeria: Pan-African University Press, pp. 379–387.
- Stephen D. Glazier. 2016. "Foreword to the Chase." Chasing Religion in the Caribbean: Ethnographic Journeys from Antigua to Trinidad, by Peter J. Marina. New York and London: Palgrave, pp. vii-xv
- Stephen D. Glazier. 2016. "Yoruba Color Symbolism" in The Encyclopedia of the Yoruba. Toyin Falola and A. Akinyemi, editors. Bloomington, IN: Indiana University Press, pp. 71–72.
- Stephen D. Glazier. 2015. "Pilgrimages in the Caribbean: A Comparison of Cases from Haiti and Trinidad’. In Religion, Pilgrimage, and Tourism, edited by Alex Norman, Carole M. Cusack. New York and London: Routledge.
- Stephen D. Glazier. 2015. "Conduits, Barriers, and Interaction Spheres: Re-Thinking the Island of Trinidad in the Guiana Cultural Area." Proceedings of the 25th International Congress for Caribbean Archaeology. Laura Del Olmo, editor. San Juan, Puerto Rico: Instituto de Cultura Puertorriguena, pp. 379–394
- Noel Titus and Stephen D. Glazier. 2014. "Grenada" Worldmark Encyclopedia of Religious Practices. Thomas Riggs, editor. Gale Research, vol. 3, pp. 13–18.
- Stephen D. Glazier. 2013. "Sango Healers and Healing in the Caribbean." Chapter 7 in Caribbean Healing Traditions: Implications for Health and Mental Health. Patsy Sutherland. Roy Moodley, and Barry Chavannes editors. New York and London: Routledge. pp. 89–100.
- Stephen D. Glazier. 2013. "Rastafarianism" in Encyclopedia of Race and Racism. 2nd edition. Patrick L. Mason, editor. New York: Macmillan Reference, pp. 472–474.
- Stephen D. Glazier. 2012. "If ‘Old Heads’ Could Talk." Anthropologica 54 (2): 199-209. JSTOR 24467402
- Stephen D. Glazier. 2012. "Religious Developments in the Caribbean Between 1865 and 1945" in The Cambridge History of Religions in America. Vol. II: Religions in America, 1790–1945. Stephen J. Stein, editor. New York and London: Cambridge University Press, pp. 727–748.
- Stephen D. Glazier. 2012. “Mel and Zora's Heroic Adventure: Representing Haitian Voodoo to 20th Century Americans.” in The Heroic Anthropologist Rides Again: The Depiction of the Anthropologist in Popular Culture. Frank A. Salamone, editor. Newcastle upon Tyne, UK: Cambridge Scholars Publishing, pp. 81–92.
- Stephen D. Glazier. 2011. "Anthropology and Religious Belief" in The Anthropology of Religion: Critical Concepts in Religious Studies. Phillips Stevens Jr, and Denice J. Szafran, editors. New York and London: Routledge, volume I, pp. 32–37.
- Stephen D. Glazier and Alfredo Figueredo. 2011. "Review of 'Caciques and cemí idols: the web spun by Taíno rulers between Hispaniola and Puerto Rico – By José R. Oliver'". Journal of the Royal Anthropological Institute 17: 414–415. https://doi.org/10.1111/j.1467-9655.2011.01698_16.x
- Stephen D. Glazier. 2011. "Aruba" (pp. 61–63), "Bahamas" (pp. 107–108), "Barbados" (pp. 117–118), "Jamaica" (pp. 613–614), and "Martinique" (II, pp. 749–750, with C. M. Dietrich) in Encyclopedia of Global Religion. Mark Jurgensmeyer and Wade Clark Roof, editors. Thousand Oaks, CA: Sage Reference.
- Stephen D. Glazier. 2010. "Health and Illness" (with Mary J. Hallin) in 21st Century Anthropology, H. James Birx, editor. Thousand Oaks, CA: Sage Reference, volume 2, pp. 925–935.
- Stephen D. Glazier. 2009. "Understanding Caribbean Religions" (with Leslie G. Desmangles and Joseph M. Murphy). Chapter 10 in Understanding the Contemporary Caribbean. 2nd edition. Richard S. Hillman and Thomas J. D'Agostino, editors. Boulder, CO and London: Lynne Rienner, pp. 289–338.
- Stephen D. Glazier. 2009. "African Diaspora, Bible in the Music of" (pp. 512–516) in Encyclopedia of the Bible and Its Reception, edited by Hermann Spleckemann, Choon Leong Seow, Hans-Josef Klauck, Paul Mendes-Flohr, Bernard McGinn, and Eric Ziolkoeski. Berlin: Walter de Gruyter
- Stephen D. Glazier. 2009. "Wither Sango?: An Inquiry into Sango's 'Authenticity' and Prominence in the Caribbean." in Sango in Africa and the African Diaspora. Joel E. Tishken, Toyin Falola, and A. Akinyemi, editors. Bloomington: Indiana University Press, pp. 233–247.
- Stephen D. Glazier. 2009. "The Anthropological Study of Religion" (pp. 24–39) in The World's Religions: Continuities and Transformations. Peter B. Clarke and Peter Beyer, editors. New York and London: Routledge, pp. 24–39.
- Stephen D. Glazier. 2008."Demanding Spirits and Reluctant Devotees: Belief and Unbelief in the Trinidadian Orisa Movement." Social Analysis 52 (1): 19–38.
- Stephen D. Glazier. 2006. "Being and Becoming a Rastafarian: Notes on the Anthropology of Religious Conversion." in Rastafari: A Universal Philosophy for the Third Millennium. Werner Zips, editor. Kingston, Jamaica: Ian Randle Publishers, pp. 256–281.
- Stephen D. Glazier. 2005. "Mystic, Connecticut" (p. 1486); "Free Will Baptists" (pp. 1305–1306); "Paugussets" (pp. 392–393); and "Camp Meeting Grounds" (p. 1297) in The Encyclopedia of New England. David A. Watters and Burt Feintuch, editors. New Haven, CT: Yale University Press
- Stephen D. Glazier. 2005. "Caribbean Religions: Pre-Columbian" (volume III, pp. 1426–1432) and "Caribbean Religions: History of Study" (volume XV, pp. 10023–10030). in The Encyclopedia of Religion. Second Edition. Lindsay Jones, general editor. New York: Macmillan Reference.
- Stephen D. Glazier. 2004. "Bourguignon, Erika." Biographical Dictionary of Social and Cultural Anthropology. Vered Amit, editor. London and New York: Routledge, pp. 69-70.
- Stephen D. Glazier. 2003. "Limin' wid Jah: Spiritual Baptists Who Become Rastafarians and Then Become Spiritual Baptists Again." The Anthropology of Religious Conversion. Andrew Buckser and Stephen D. Glazier, editors. Lanham, MD: Rowman and Littlefield, pp. 149–170.
- Stephen D. Glazier. 2001.“Adumbrations of Dread: Spiritual Baptists at the Dawn of the Millennium." Journal of Ritual Studies 15, no. 1: 17–26.
- Stephen D. Glazier. 1999. Three entries: "Benjamin W. Arnett;" "John Mifflin Brown", and "William Wallace Fenn." American National Biography. J. A. Garraty and M. C. Carnes, editors. New York: Oxford University Press.
- Stephen D. Glazier. 1998. Review of "Explorations in Anthropology and Theology, edited by Frank A. Salamone and Walter R. Adams." American Anthropologist 100 (2): 547–548.
- Stephen D. Glazier. 1997. "Associate Editor's Foreword." Migrants, Regional Cultures, and Latin American Cities. Edited by Teofilo Altamirano and Lane Ryo Hirabayashi. Society for Latin American Anthropology Publication Series #13. Washington, D. C.: American Anthropological Association.
- Stephen D. Glazier. 1996. "Changes in the Spiritual Baptist Religion, 1976-1990." Ay BoBo: Afro-Caribbean Cults: Identity and Resistance. Teil 1: Kulte. Manfred Kremser, editor. Wien: Institut fur Volkerkunde der Universitat Wien, pp. 107–114.
- Stephen D. Glazier. 1995." New Religions among Afro-Americans (Caribbean and South America)", and "New Religions: Afro-Suriname." HarperCollins Dictionary of Religion. J. Z. Smith, general editor. San Francisco: HarperCollins
- Stephen D. Glazier. 1995. "New Religious Movements in the Caribbean: Identity and Resistance." Born Out of Resistance: Caribbean Cultural Creativity as a Response to European Expansion. Wim Hoogbergen, editor. Utrecht: University of Utrecht/ ISOR Press, pp. 253–262.
- Stephen D. Glazier. 1993. "Responding to the Anthropologist: When the Spiritual Baptists of Trinidad Read What I Write About Them." When They Read What We Write: The Politics of Ethnography. Caroline B. Brettell, editor. New York: Bergin and Garvey, pp. 37–48.
- Stephen D. Glazier. 1992. "Slavery and Social Death by Orlando Patterson;" and "The Content of Our Character, by Shelby Steele." Masterpieces in African-American Literature. Frank N. Magill, editor. New York: HarperCollins.
- Stephen D. Glazier. 1991. "Impressions of Aboriginal Technology: The Case of the Caribbean Canoe." Proceedings of the 13th International Congress of Caribbean Archaeology. E. N. Ayubi and Jay Haviser, editors. Willemstad, Curaçao: Instituto di Arkeologia i Antropologia di Antia Ulandes, pp. 149–161.
- Stephen D. Glazier. 1988. "Worldwide Missions of Trinidad's Spiritual Baptists." The National Geographical Journal of India 34 (1): 75–78
- Stephen D. Glazier. 1988. "The Religious Mosaic: Playful Celebration in Trinidadian Shango." Play and Culture 1: 216–235.
- Stephen D. Glazier. 1988. "Rastafarianism." The World Book Encyclopedia, vol. 16, p. 147.
- Stephen D. Glazier. 1987. "Race and Race Relations in Trinidad." The International Handbook of Race and Race Relations. Jay A. Sigler, editor. Westport, CT: Greenwood, pp. 321–337.
- Stephen D. Glazier. 1987. "Caribbean Religions: Pre-Columbian." The Encyclopedia of Religion, volume III. Mircea Eliade, editor. New York: Free Press/Macmillan, pp. 81–90.
- Stephen D. Glazier. 1986. "Heterodoxy and Heteropraxy in the Spiritual Baptist Faith. Revista/Review Interamericana 16 (Spring-Winter): 47-66.
- Stephen D. Glazier. 1985. "Mourning in the Afro-Baptist Tradition: A Comparative Study of Religion in the American South and Trinidad." Southern Quarterly 23: 141–156.
- Stephen D. Glazier (with Leonard Barrett, Merrill Singer, and George Eaton Simpson). 1985. "Religion and Social Justice: Caribbean Perspectives." Phylon 46 (2): 283–299.
- Stephen D. Glazier. 1985. "Syncretism and Separation: Ritual Change in an Afro-Caribbean Faith." Journal of American Folklore 98 (387): 49–62.
- Stephen D. Glazier. 1984. "Review of: Better Felt Than Said: The Holiness Pentecostal Experience in Southern Appalachia, by Troy Abell." American Anthropologist 86: 457.
- Stephen D. Glazier. 1983. "Caribbean Pilgrimages: A Typology." Journal for the Scientific Study of Religion 22 (4): 316–325.
- Stephen D. Glazier. 1983. "Cultural Pluralism and Respectability in Trinidad." Ethnic and Racial Studies 6 (3): 351–355.
- Stephen D. Glazier. 1983. "Spiritual Baptist Outreach from Trinidad." Cultural Survival Quarterly 7 (3): 38–40.
- Stephen D. Glazier. 1982. "An Annotated Ethnographic Bibliography of Trinidad." Behavior Science Research 17 (1 & 2): 31–58
- Stephen D. Glazier. 1982. "The St. Joseph's and Mayo Collections from Trinidad, West Indies." Florida Anthropologist 35 (2): 208–215.
- Alfredo E. Figueredo and Stephen D. Glazier. 1982. "Spatial Behavior, Ethnicity and Social Organization in the Prehistory of Trinidad." Journal de la Societe des Americanistes(Paris) 68: 33–40.
- Stephen D. Glazier. 1980. "Review of: Satan's Power: A Deviant Psychotherapy Cult, by William S. Bainbridge." American Anthropologist 82: 647–648.
- Stephen D. Glazier.1980. "The Boye in lsland-Carib Culture." La antropologia americanista en al actualidad: Homenaje al Raphael Girard. vol. 2, Mexico City: Editores Mexicanas Unidos, pp. 34–46.
- Stephen D. Glazier. 1979. "Exorcism and Modernization: A Caribbean Case Study" Paper presented at the annual meeting of the American Anthropological Association, Houston, 1977. Transcultural Psychiatric Research Review 16 vol. 1: 82-83. doi:10.1177/136346157901600118
- Stephen D. Glazier. 1977/78. "Bibliografia del Medium Espiritista y la Posesion Parte 1." Boletin del Museo del Hombre Dominicano 8: 125–159; Parte II, 9: 137–159

Committees

- Stephen D. Glazier. 2012. Member/Acting Chair, Ph.D. dissertation defense committee, Mary J. Hallin, Geography and Indigenous Studies, University of Nebraska-Lincoln: "Collaboration between Traditional and Biomedical Practitioners in the Bui Division, Cameroon. "Committee: Patricia Draper, Robert Hitchcock, Stephen D. Glazier, Doug Amedeo.
- Stephen D. Glazier. 2012. Member, Ph. D. dissertation defense committee, Christopher R. H. Garneau, Sociology, University of Nebraska-Lincoln: "Perceived Stigma and Stigma Management of Midwest Seculars."
- Stephen D. Glazier. 2009. Outside member, Ph.D. dissertation committee: Tamasin Ramsay, Monash University, Victoria, Australia: "Custodians of Purity: An Ethnography of the Brahman Kumaris."
- Stephen D. Glazier. 2011. Chair, MA thesis committee, Anthropology, University of Nebraska-Lincoln. Don Arp Jr: "The Aputu: An Examination and Analysis of a War Club Form Distinctive to the Guianas."
- Stephen D. Glazier. 2014. Member, MA thesis committee, Anthropology, University of Nebraska-Lincoln: "Emerging from the Shadows: Civil War, Human Rights, and Peace-building among Peasants and Indigenous Peoples in Colombia and Peru in the Late 20th and Early 21st Centuries," by Charles A. Flowerday. Martha McCollough, chair.
- Stephen D. Glazier. 2005. Member, MA thesis committee, Anthropology, University of Nebraska–Lincoln. Gwendolyn K. Meister: "A Passion for the Work: A Study of Decision-Making and Public Folklorists' Careers." Patricia Draper, chair.
