= Transfinite =

Transfinite may refer to:

- Transfinite number, a number larger than all finite numbers, yet not absolutely infinite
- Transfinite induction, an extension of mathematical induction to well-ordered sets
  - Transfinite recursion
- Transfinite arithmetic, the generalization of elementary arithmetic to infinite quantities
- Transfinite interpolation, a method in numerical analysis to construct functions over a planar domain so that they match a given function on the boundary
