= Hansford =

Hansford is a surname and rare male given name, which originates from the Old English, meaning "'Ford near protected temple'".

== Surname ==
- Alan Hansford (born 1968), English cricketer
- Dianne Hansford (born 1964), American computer scientist
- Edwin Hansford (1895-1959), Canadian politician
- Frank Hansford (1874-1952), American former professional baseball player
- Gregg Hansford (1952-1995), Australian motorcycle and touring car racer
- Shooting of Danny Hansford

== Given name ==
- Hansford Rowe (1924-2017), American character actor
- Hansford Rowe (born 1954), American bass guitarist
- Hansford T. Johnson (born 1936), American General

== See also ==
- Hansford, Nova Scotia
- Hansford, West Virginia
- Hansford County, Texas
- USS Hansford (APA-106), an American attack transport
