= Box Hill Institute =

Educational institution in Melbourne, Australia

Coordinates: 37°48′59″S 145°07′07″E

- Type: Technical and further education (TAFE)
- Established: 25 January 1984
- Affiliations: Centre for Adult Education
- CEO: Grant Radford
- Students: 40,000
- Location: Melbourne, Victoria, Australia
- Campus: Box Hill, Lilydale, Melbourne CBD
- Website: www.boxhill.edu.au

Box Hill Institute is a provider of vocational and higher education, situated in the eastern suburbs of Melbourne, Victoria. The institute operates across multiple campuses, including three in Box Hill (Elgar, Nelson, and Whitehorse), one in Lilydale (Lilydale Lakeside), and a city campus in Melbourne's central business district, where it is co-located with the Centre for Adult Education.

== History ==
Box Hill Institute is the descendant of two Box Hill area technical schools.

"Box Hill Technical School for Girls and Women" was opened on 4 September 1924, having welcomed 65 Junior pupils some six months before. The girls primary studied domestic subjects like housewifery, cookery, millinery and dressmaking. Some girls also took courses like accounting and secretarial work.

On 2 February 1943 the "Box Hill Technical School for Boys" was established because many boys in the eastern suburbs were being turned away from Swinburne Technical School. They studied subjects like sheetmetal work, technical drawing and carpentry.

Throughout the 1960s and 1970s both technical schools added post-secondary options like certificates in business studies and engineering. The Girls' Technical School started the first business certificate course in 1967.

The Girls' Technical School was renamed "Whitehorse Technical School" in 1971. Around this time the Boys' Technical School separated its tertiary technical offerings from the secondary ones, the tertiary section becoming "Box Hill Technical School". Both schools were declared colleges of Technical and Further Education in late 1981.

On 25 January 1984, Whitehorse Technical School and Box Hill Technical School merged to become "Box Hill College of TAFE".

On 12 September 1995, the Governor in Council approved orders to change the name of Box Hill College of TAFE to Box Hill Institute of TAFE. The college was renamed "Box Hill Institute" ten years later.

== Courses ==
=== Higher education ===
Box Hill Institute offers a range of higher education courses at a Masters, Graduate, and Undergraduate level. It covers areas such as biotechnology, animal science, music, music business, fashion, business, IT and more.

=== Vocational education ===
Box Hill Institute offers a large range of vocational courses. It covers areas including hospitality, tourism, health, beauty, automotive, transport, carpentry, electrical, refrigeration, construction, plumbing, engineering, business, commerce, art, graphic design, dance, music, fashion, live production, English, English as an additional language, ELICOS, VPC, VM, VCE and more.

== Awards ==
In 2015 Box Hill Institute won more than 20 awards, including Excellence in International Education at the Victorian Internal Education Awards.

In 2013 Box Hill Institute was declared International Training Provider of the Year. In 2012 Box Hill Institute won Victorian Large Training Provider of the Year. In 2012 they also won the Premier's Sustainability Award – Tertiary Education category

== Notable alumni ==
- G Flip, Australian singer, songwriter, multi-instrumentalist and producer
- George Calombaris, chef/restaurateur, judge on Masterchef Australia
- Chris Cheney, Musician, Guitarist & Lead Vocalist for The Living End
- Helen Croome, Musician, Songwriter & Lead Vocalist for Gossling
- Guy Grossi, owner of famous Melbourne restaurant Grossi Florentino
- Matthew Richardson, Richmond Football Club player
- Herb Sawatzky, Former Richmond Football player
- Curtis Stone, Chef
- Tobie Puttock, Chef (Executive Head-Chef of Melbourne's Fifteen restaurants)
- Kung Tsui-chang, 2nd Sacrificial Official to Confucius in the Republic of China (Taiwan)

== Notable faculty ==
- Ian Gardiner, artist, woodcut print maker
- Dianne Beevers, artist, sculptor, curator

== See also ==
- Technical and Further Education
