= Ian Gardiner (artist) =

Australian artist

Ian Gardiner (1943–2008) was a Melbourne-based artist whose practice ranged from screen printing, linocuts and photographs through to woodblock prints, monoprint, collage and montage. Gardiner also returned to painting late in his career.

Gardiner held seven solo shows throughout his life and participated in group exhibitions both in Australia and abroad. His prints are held in the collections of the Museum of Modern Art, New York, Nantenshi Gallery, Japan, National Gallery of Victoria, Melbourne, National Gallery of Australia, Canberra, Queen Victoria Museum & Art Gallery, Tasmania, and other galleries throughout Australia. Gardiner was a participant in the formative years of the Australian Print Council and a lecturer at Melbourne TAFE Colleges for 20 years.

== Early years: 1961–67 ==
Ian Gardiner spent four years at Swinburne Technical College in Hawthorn, Victoria, graduating in 1964 with a Certificate and Diploma of Art.

His early work consisted of broken, swirling lines and strong colour contrasts. The combined influences of contemporary abstraction, traveling in Asia and a greater exposure to Eastern and Western art impacted upon Gardiner's work and he became interested in how colour could be arranged to set up optical effects independently of subject matter. He experimented with vertical and horizontal formats, surface and depth and worked with irregular linocut blocks that were overlapped to suggest movement and the unfolding of time in space. His works were influenced by the painter Josef Albers and featured broken black, purple, mauve and grey squares within squares; two of these prints were purchased by the Museum of Modern Art, New York, when Ian Gardiner and his wife Judith were resident in Japan.

== Japan 1971–74 ==
From late 1971, Ian and Judith Gardiner lived in Tokyo. Gardiner made contact with Japanese artists and gallery managers and exhibited new works at Nantenshi Gallery and Isetan Gallery. While in Tokyo, he was awarded a teaching certificate in 1973 and he began part-time post-graduate studies specialising in prints. He became friends with a number of the Spanish and American students. Access to a print studio, new and varied resources and the sharing of knowledge turned Gardiner's interest in linocuts to the making of etchings and woodcuts. He learnt about traditional Japanese paper making techniques and began collecting ukiyo-e prints.

American artist Richard J. Flavin was also an important informative influence. A fellow Masters student at Tokyo's Geijutsu Daigaku, Flavin specialised in paper making techniques and eventually settled permanently in Japan. Gardiner's second one-man show of etchings at Gin Gallery in 1974 was well received by Anita Feldman writing in a Tokyo newspaper.

== South Melbourne: 1970s and 80s ==
Ian and Judith Gardiner returned to Australia in the spring of 1974. They staying initially in Surrey Hills and then eventually settled in South Melbourne.

Ian Gardiner was appointed art teacher at the outer Melbourne Ringwood Technical School from October 1974 through to 1979. During this four-year period, he focused on extending the methods and techniques of etching and linocuts that he had picked up and developed in Japan. This work culminated in a solo exhibition at Clive Parry Gallery in Melbourne in 1978.

In 1979 Gardiner changed his focus to making woodcuts and it is for this medium that he ultimately became best known. While the linocuts continued with the coloured gridded formats of earlier etchings, critics such as the Melbourne Herald's Alan McCulloch suggested the woodcuts were more ‘painterly’ with free-form shapes superimposed over the gridded backgrounds.

A comprehensive exhibition of Gardiner's work was held at Stuart Gerstman Galleries, Richmond, in 1983. Having just turned forty, it was the penultimate solo show that he would participate in. According to the art critic, Patrick McCaughey, Night Rift, 1983, a colour woodblock acquired from the exhibition by Griffith University, Brisbane, exemplifies the way Gardiner built up the surface texture of his prints to create a shadowy and mysterious world.

In 1984, Gardiner joined Box Hill TAFE. During this time Gardiner's subject matter, style and techniques took a number of divergent paths. There are a group of woodcuts and drawings that reference things close at hand such as observing rituals involving family pets and dogs walking (or defecating) in local parks, scenes of Pickle Street, South Melbourne, the beach at Albert Park or exploring the wetlands under Melbourne's Westgate Bridge. There is an interest in exercise, dance and acrobatics; activities that Gardiner participated in and believed tested the potentialities and limits of the human body. There is also a body of works that explore his sexuality and state of mind.

Ian and Judith Gardiner returned to Japan as often as circumstances permitted. These experiences, and the many photographs that he took, became a major source for Gardiner's art.

Drawing became a major focus for his work in the 1980s and 90s. Gardiner was inspired by the clear plastic rubbish bags put out each day for collection in Japan. A 1981 series of drawings focused on their contents and the juxtaposition of transparency with solid forms. By 1988 this interest in the detritus of Japanese street culture had developed into a series of unusual viewpoints of the city and construction sites taken from high vantage points such as Thirty-Views, 1989, and in collages of packaging, billboards, magazine stands and ads. The portraits of Japanese street hawkers, people walking dogs and street-wise youth were part of his ongoing fascination with Japanese types that had been influenced by the impact of Western consumerism and individualism.

Visits to Italy in 1989, Chicago, and to Boston, New York and Washington in 1990 provided additional subject matter for Gardiner to record daily rituals, people and events as he surveyed city streets, forms and buildings under construction and in ruin. Like his interest in the human body, Gardiner responded to athletic or muscular frames and the building up of forms as well as their breaking down or decay.

== Master of Arts 1991-91 ==
In 1991, Gardiner commenced study for a Master of Arts (Research), School of Art and Design, at Monash University. The works he produced were based on his experiences and material that he had sourced in Japan, including photographs and extensive visual diaries that he sometimes completed in less than a week. His intended plan of study proposed an ongoing exploration of the physical and cultural environment of Japan juxtaposed with the material environment of the local scene.

The Masters took him over four years to complete. The final exhibition held at Monash University in February 1995 was a large-scale installation of woodblock prints printed from edge to edge. Dark in tone, Gardiner limited the presence of light by drawing on Japanese cinematic traditions to create a shadowy world filled with tension in which the spectator was drawn in.

== You Yangs, Somers and the Mornington Peninsula ==
During the late 1990s and early 2000s Gardiner started to go on regular fortnightly sketching field trips with his Box Hill TAFE colleagues Sue Shaw and Laurel McKenzie. They travelled to the You Yangs, nearby Anakie and the Brisbane Ranges, situated between Melbourne and Geelong. During this time he had stopped making woodcuts altogether as the cutting and printing became physically too demanding. He worked on small panels and, like the Monash University installation, was able to achieve a sense of scale by gridding them into a larger mass.

In 1999, Ian and Judith Gardiner purchased a house at Somers on Westernport Bay. This became a second studio for Ian Gardiner and the catalyst for new work. Gardiner painted the dry hills and surrounding paddocks and farms, and the rock formations and ocean pools from Hastings around to Flinders and Cape Schanck, and became obsessed with trees, water and rocks. Starting with realist depictions, he developed the motifs into brightly painted abstract compositions comprising cubes and stripes. Many of these works were assembled for a posthumous exhibition organised for Judith Gardiner by their friend Kate Bêchet at Brightspace Gallery, St Kilda, in 2009.

Ian Gardiner's aim was to combine his respect for artistic traditions with immediacy, experimentation and chance. Although in the end he believed that figuration had a greater capacity than abstraction to invest meaning in art, the raison d’être of his practice remained constant throughout: rigorous self-examination carried by the aesthetic power of art.

Ian Gardiner died in 2008 from complications arising from cancer.

== Collections ==
Museum of Modern Art, New York
Nantenshi Gallery, Japan
National Gallery of Australia, Canberra
National Gallery of Victoria, Melbourne
Queen Victoria Museum & Art Gallery, Launceston
Australian Print Council Archive, Melbourne
Burnie Regional Art Gallery, Tasmania
City of Whitehorse, Melbourne (Formerly City of Box Hill)
Griffith University, Brisbane
Mornington Peninsula Regional Gallery
Swinburne University of Technology
University of Tasmania, Hobart
Wagga Wagga Regional Art Gallery
Warrnambool Art Gallery, Victoria

== Selected bibliography ==
- Ian Gardiner, Brightspace Gallery, 2009, exhibition catalogue, State Library of Victoria, Melbourne
- Swinburne University Academic Report, Swinburne University Student Records, Hawthorn, Melbourne*Gardiner, Ian, Master of Arts Thesis, Monash University, Melbourne, Caulfield Campus
- James, Rodney, Ian Gardiner: the printmaker's art 2015|Estate of Ian Gardiner|National Library of Australia, Canberra ISBN 9780994358622 pages=74
- McLean, David, 'Ian Gardiner – Printmaker’, Video Interaction, 1998, DVD interview with David McLean, 2008, http://www.worldcat.org/title/print-maker-ian-gardiner/oclc/222365547
- Grant, Kirsty, In Relief: Australian wood engravings, woodcuts and linocuts, National Gallery of Victoria, Melbourne, 2007, p. 55, illus., 2007, ISBN 0-7241-0191-8, State Library of Victoria, Melbourne, A 761.0994 G76I 72pp
- McCulloch, Alan, Susan McCulloch and Emily McCulloch Childs, The new McCulloch's encyclopedia of Australian art, Aus Art Editions in association with The Miegunyah Press, Melbourne 2006, p. 451, 2006, State Library of Victoria, Melbourne, AR 709.9403 M13E (2006), ISBN 0-522-85317-X
- McCulloch, Alan, Herald 20 October 1980, p. 12*Patrick McCaughey, The Age, 7 July 1983, p. 11
- Australian Identities in Printmaking: The Australian Print Collection of the Wagga Wagga Regional Art Gallery, 2001, National Gallery of Australia, Melbourne, ISBN 1-875247-15-7
- McKenzie, Laurel, Water based monoprinting, Expressions Art, Kew, Victoria, 1995, National Gallery of Australia
- Quick, Ron ‘Henri Worland Memorial Print Award 1989, Imprint, Vol. 24, no.4 December 1989, pp. 7-8, State Library of Victoria, Melbourne, A760.61M7
- Germaine, Max, Artists and Galleries of Australia, Boolarong, Brisbane, second edition 1984, State Library of Victoria, Melbourne, AR709.9403 ISBN 0-908175-87-6
- Kemp, Franz, Contemporary Australian Printmakers, Lansdowne, Melbourne 1976, State Library of Victoria, Melbourne, AF 769.994 A48, ISBN 0-7018-0469-6
- Feldman, Anita ‘Art: People and places’, Mainichi Daily News, Tokyo, 8 February 1974
- Kwang-Jong, Suh, ‘Traveller urges easier access to relics of Korean Culture’, Korean News, Seoul, 1972
