= People's Princess (disambiguation) =

The term People's Princess (Diana Frances; 1961–1997) refers to the first wife of Prince Charles (later Charles III) and mother of Prince William.

People's Princess or The People's Princess may also refer to:

- People's princess, the sobriquet used by Tony Blair to describe Diana, Princess of Wales
- The People's Princess (radio play), a British radio drama, 2008

== See also ==
- Diana Spencer (disambiguation)
- Kaiulani: The People's Princess, Hawaii, 1889, a book in The Royal Diaries series by Ellen Emerson White, 2001
- Lady Di (disambiguation)
- Modthryth, the queen consort of King Offa from Beowulf whose title folces cwen means "the people's princess"
- Peoples (disambiguation)
- Princess (disambiguation)
- Princess Diana (disambiguation)
- Tuathflaith, an Irish name whose meaning is "princess of the people"
