= Dianne Stewart =

Dianne Stewart or Diane Stewart may refer to:

- Dianne Stewart (author) (born 1952), South African author
- Dianne M. Stewart, Jamaican-born American professor
- Diane Purdie Stewart (also known as Alexandra Quinn; born 1973), Canadian former pornographic actress
