= Dundee Whaling Expedition =

1892–1893 voyage to Antarctica

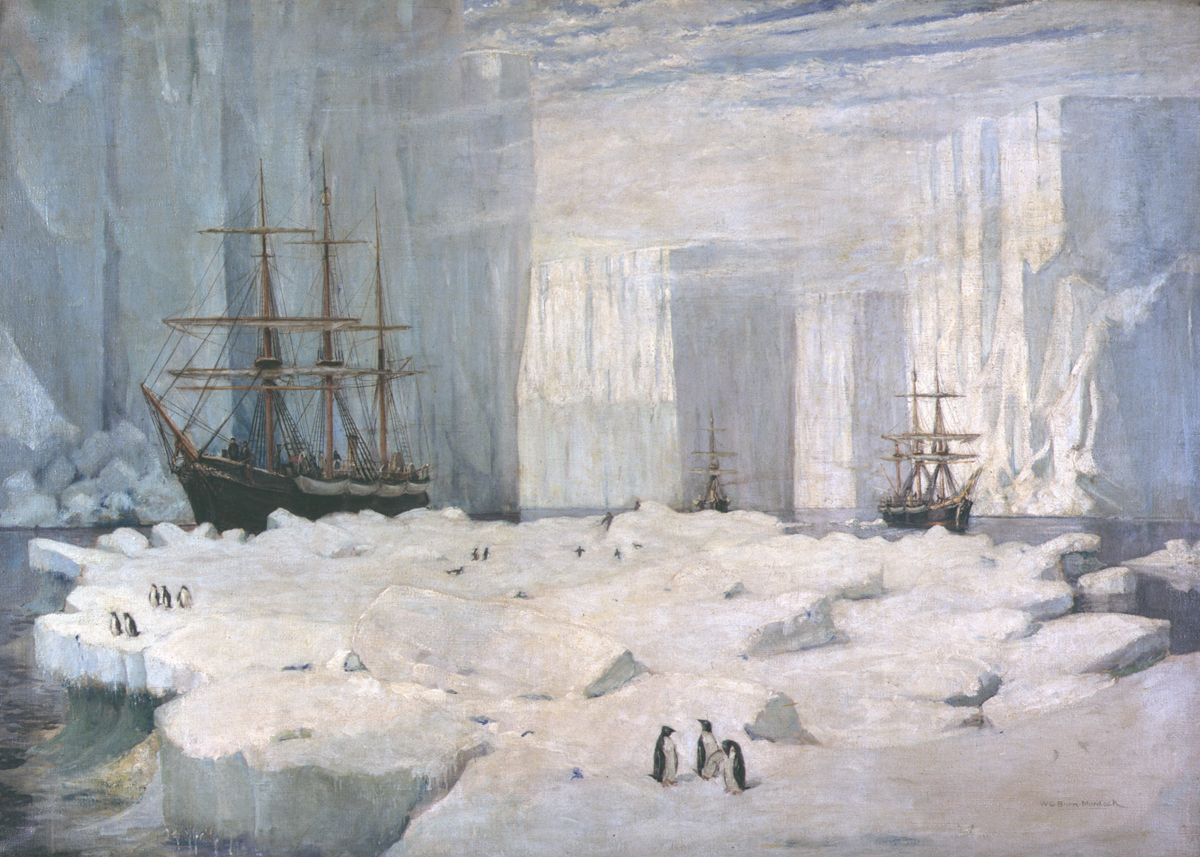
The Dundee Antarctic Whaling Expedition by William Gordon Burn Murdoch.

The Dundee Whaling Expedition (1892–1893) was a commercial voyage from Scotland to Antarctica.

Whaling in the Arctic was in decline from overfishing. The merchants of Dundee decided to equip a fleet to sail all the way to the Weddell Sea in search of right whales. Antarctic whaling was mostly done from shore-based stations.

On 6 September 1892, four steam-powered whaling ships, the Balaena, Active, Diana and Polar Star, set off. In the end they found no whales they could harvest as the blue whales of the Antarctic were too powerful to be captured. However, the expedition managed to make a profit by collecting numerous seal pelts.

The expedition included the polar scientist William Speirs Bruce and William Gordon Burn Murdoch, surgeon and assistant on the Balaena under Captain Alexander Fairweather. On 8 January 1893, Captain Thomas Robertson of Active discovered Dundee Island (63°30′S 055°55′W).

== See also ==
- List of Antarctic expeditions
- Whaling in Scotland
