= Diana Spencer (disambiguation) =

Diana Spencer (1961–1997) was the first wife of Prince Charles (later Charles III) and mother of Prince William and Prince Harry.

Diana Spencer may also refer to:

- Diana Russell, Duchess of Bedford (née Lady Diana Spencer; 1710–1735), wife of John Russell, 4th Duke of Bedford
- Lady Diana Beauclerk (née Lady Diana Spencer; 1734–1808), English artist
- Diana Spencer (diver) (born 1934), British diver
- Diana Spencer (classicist) (born 1969), Irish Classics professor

== See also ==
- Diana Spence, a character in the British soap opera Brookside
- Diana Spencer Churchill (1909–1963), eldest daughter of Winston Churchill
- Lady Di (disambiguation)
- People's Princess (disambiguation)
- Princess Diana (disambiguation)
