= Dian, Armenia =

Dian Դիան
- Location within Armenia Location within Aragatsotn
- Coordinates: 40°21′10″N 44°04′34″E
- Country: Armenia
- Province: Aragatsotn
- Municipality: Talin

Population (2011)
  - Total: 105
- Time zone: UTC+4
  - Summer (DST): UTC+5

Dian (Armenian: Դիան) is a village in the Talin Municipality of the Aragatsotn Province of Armenia.
