= Diana Strait =

Strait in Russia

Coordinates: 47°14′N 152°21′E

Diana Strait (Russian: Proliv Diany; Japanese: Shimushiru Kaikyo) is a deep strait that separates the islands of Ketoy and Simushir in the Kuril Islands, Russia. It is 16.1 km (about 10 mi) wide. The flood tidal current in the strait sets northwest, while the ebb flows to the southeast. These currents may reach up to three knots.

== History ==
American whaleships in the 1840s and 1850s occasionally used the strait to enter and exit the Sea of Okhotsk on their way to and from cruises for bowhead and right whales.
