= Dianne Hansford =

American computer scientist

Dianne Carol Hansford
- Born: 1964 (age 61–62)
- Education: University of Utah (B.S. Mathematics, 1986); Arizona State University (M.S., 1988; Ph.D., 1991, Computer Science)
- Spouse: Gerald E. Farin (m. 1992; died 2016)
- Website: http://www.farinhansford.com/dianne/

Dianne Carol Hansford (born 1964) is an American computer scientist known for her research on Coons patches in computer graphics and for her textbooks on computer-aided geometric design, linear algebra, and the mathematics behind scientific visualization. She is a lecturer at Arizona State University in the School of Computing and Augmented Intelligence, and the cofounder of a startup based on her research, 3D Compression Technologies.

== Education and career ==
Hansford is a 1986 graduate of the University of Utah. She went to Arizona State University for graduate study, earning a master's degree in 1988 and completing her Ph.D. in 1991. Her dissertation, Boundary Curves with Quadric Precision for a Tangent, Continuous Scattered Data Interpolant, was supervised by Robert E. Barnhill.

She became a Fulbright Scholar in German, doing postdoctoral research at the Technical University Darmstadt, and then worked in the computing industry for several years, including co-founding 3D Compression Technologies in 2000, before returning to Arizona State as a research scientist in 2004. She became an associate research professor in 2006 and a lecturer in computing in 2016.

== Selected publications ==
Hansford's books, coauthored with Arizona State University professor Gerald Farin, include:

- The Geometry Toolbox for Graphics and Modeling (A K Peters, 1998); revised as Practical Linear Algebra: A Geometry Toolbox (A K Peters, 2005; 4th ed., CRC Press, 2021)
- The Essentials of CAGD (CRC Press, 2000)
- Mathematical Principles for Scientific Computing and Visualization (A K Peters, 2008)

She is also the author of a highly cited paper on Coons patches:

- Farin, Gerald; Hansford, Dianne (1999), "Discrete Coons patches", Computer Aided Geometric Design, 16 (7): 691–700, doi:10.1016/S0167-8396(99)00031-X, MR 1718057
