= Diana (Vouet) =

Painting of Diana by Simon Vouet

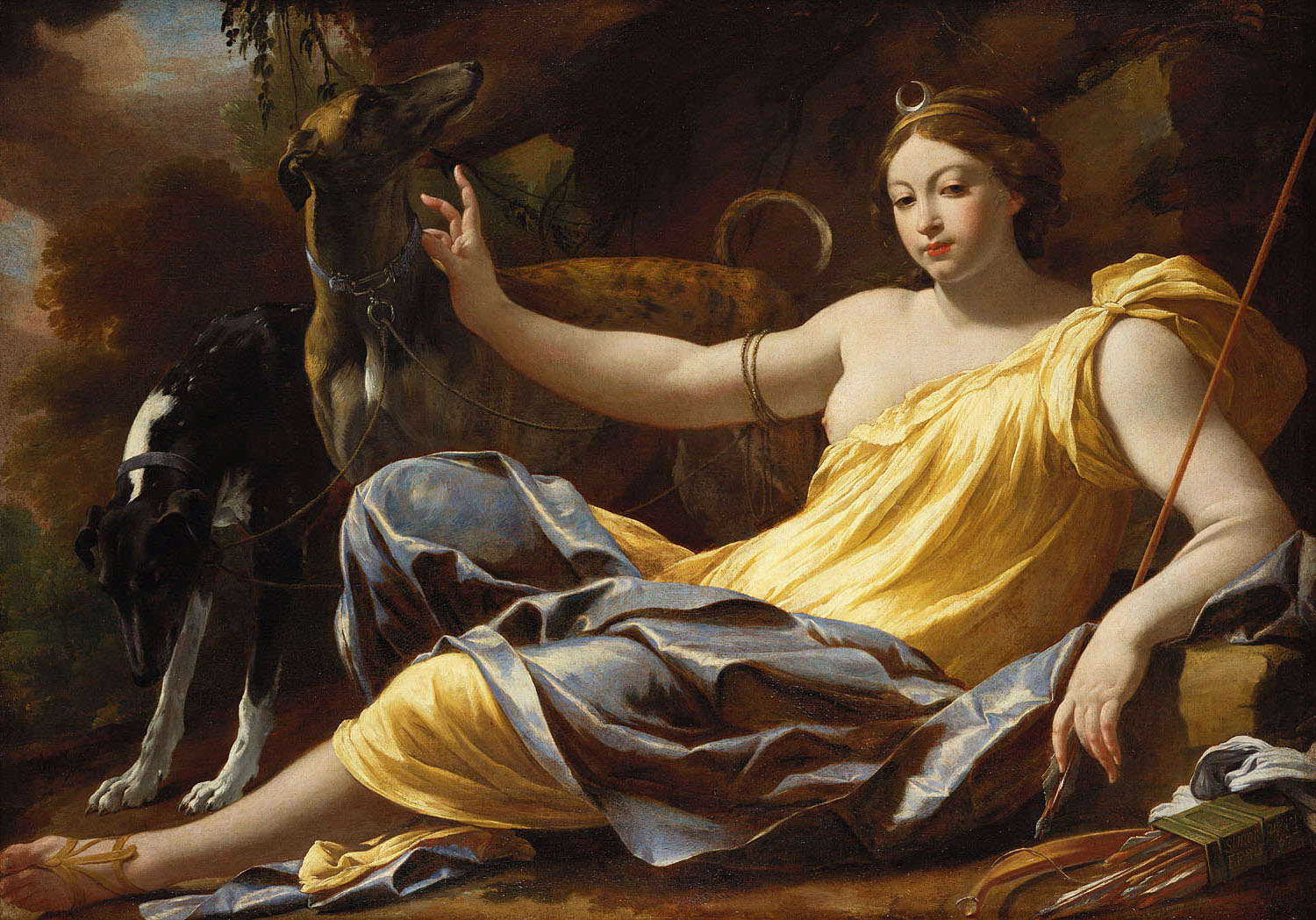
Diana (1637) by Simon Vouet

Diana is a 1637 painting of Diana by Simon Vouet. It was produced in Paris and sent to England as part of the dowry of Louis XIII's sister Henrietta Maria of France on her marriage to Charles I of England. It is still in the Royal Collection and now hangs in the Cumberland Gallery at Hampton Court Palace.

== Sources ==
- https://web.archive.org/web/20120204082319/http://www.artehistoria.jcyl.es/genios/cuadros/5291.htm
- https://www.royalcollection.org.uk/collection/403930/diana
