= The Dianne =

Residential building in Portland, Oregon, U.S.

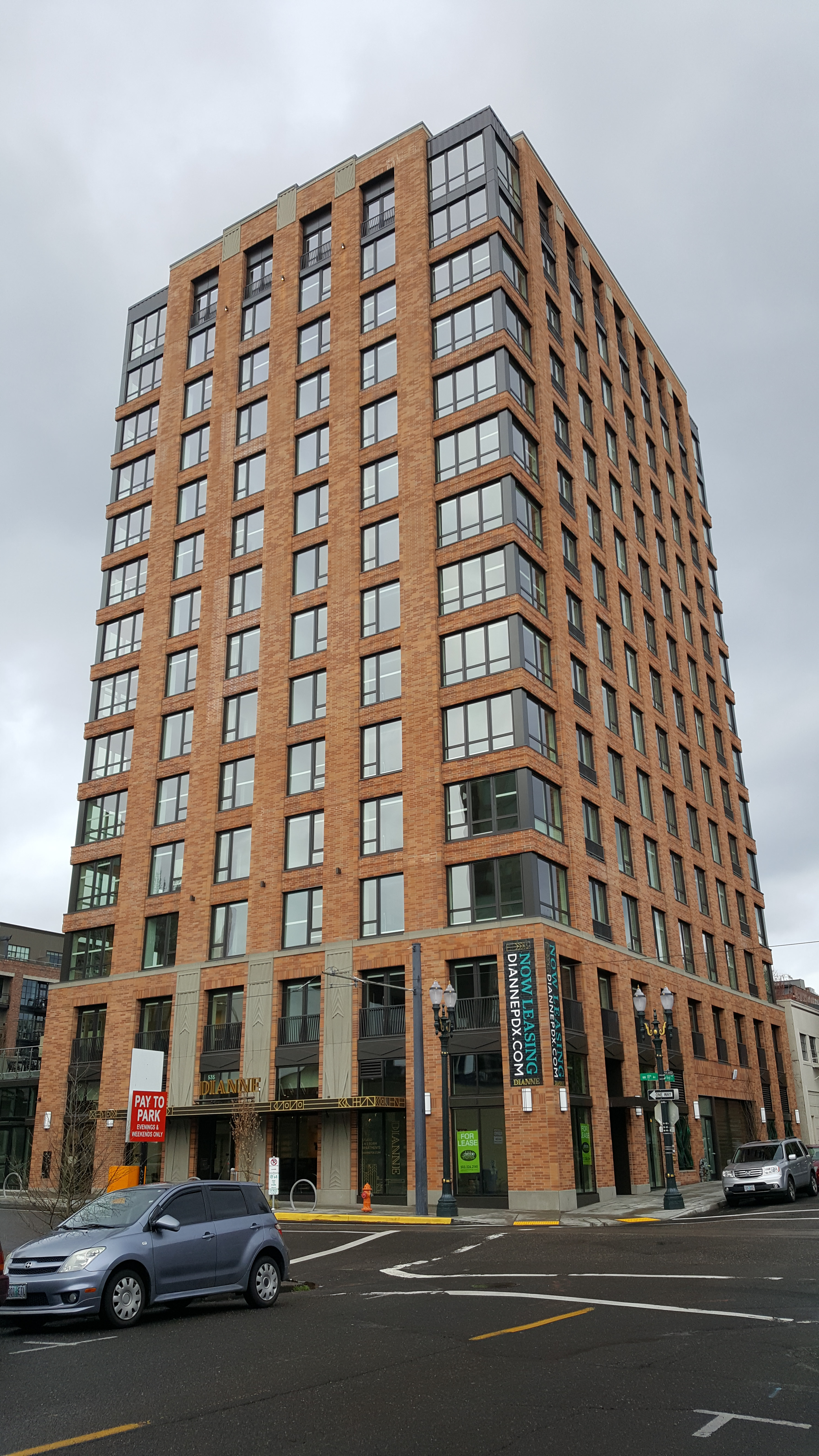
- The building's exterior in 2018
- Interactive map of the The Dianne area

General information
- Location: Portland, Oregon, United States
- Coordinates: 45.527031°N 122.682610°W

The Dianne, also known as NW 11th and Hoyt, is a high-rise residential building in Portland, Oregon's Pearl District, in the United States. Construction began in May 2016 and was completed in April 2018.

The building was a 2018 TopProjects finalist.
