= Dyane =

- Census town
- Location in Maharashtra, India
- Coordinates: 20.5783°N 74.5098°E
- Country: India
- State: Maharashtra
- District: Nashik

Population (2001)
  - Total: 24,837

Languages
  - Official: Marathi
- Time zone: UTC+5:30 (IST)

Dyane is a census town in Nashik district in the state of Maharashtra, India.

== Demographics ==
As of the 2001 India census, Dyane had a population of 24,837. Males constitute 51% of the population and females 49%. Dyane has an average literacy rate of 58%, lower than the national average of 59.5%: male literacy is 64% and, female literacy is 51%. In Dyane, 20% of the population is under 6 years of age.
