= DIANA FEA =

Computer-aided engineering software

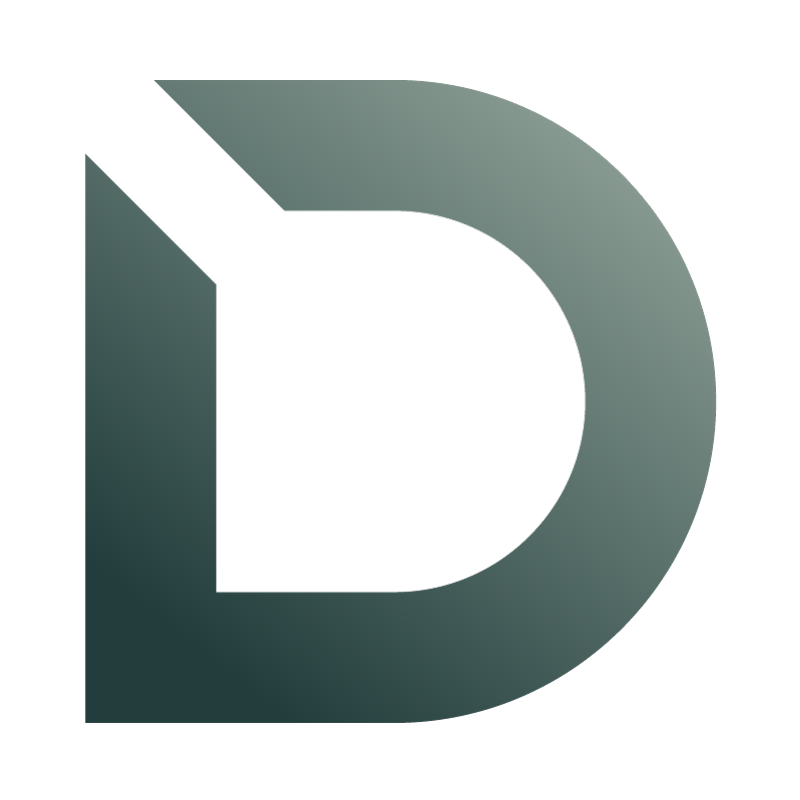
- DIANA Finite Element Analysis Latest Logo
- Original author: TNO
- Developer: DIANA FEA BV
- Release: 1972; 54 years ago
- Stable release: 10.9
- Operating system: Microsoft Windows; Linux
- Platform: Windows/x86-64; Linux x86-64
- Type: Computer-aided engineering, Finite Element Analysis
- License: Proprietary commercial software
- Website: dianafea.com

DIANA (from DIsplacement ANAlyser) is a Finite Element Analysis (FEA) solution that does basic and advanced analysis of various structures. DIANA FEA BV (previously TNO DIANA BV) develops software and with several re-sellers, distributes it worldwide. A selection of material models, element libraries, and analysis procedures within the package gives DIANA flexibility. Engineers have used DIANA to design dams and dikes, tunnels and analyze underground structures, oil and gas, historical constructions, and large reinforced concrete structures. Some specialized analyses available in DIANA for these fields of use include seismic analysis, fire analysis, and young hardening concrete.

== History ==
In 1972, TNO (Netherlands Organisation for Applied Scientific Research) authored the code that would eventually form the basis of the DIANA FEA BV "DIANA" software. The initial idea had been to develop an in-house code for consultancy work on concrete mechanics and civil engineering. This code was based on the displacement method and was called "DIANA", an acronym for DIsplacement ANAlyser.

In October 2002 the Third DIANA World Conference took place in Tokyo.

In 2002, TNO founded TNO DIANA BV to combine commercial and technical activities and to focus on the needs of DIANA users worldwide. Thus, in early 2003, TNO DIANA BV took over technical activities from TNO Building and Construction research, marketing, and sales from DIANA Analysis BV. It also became the owner of Femsys.

In 2023, Rocscience made a strategic investment in DIANA.
