= Dianne (TV program) =

- Genre: Music
- Presented by: Dianne Heatherington
- Country of origin: Canada
- Original language: English
- No. of seasons: 1

Production
- Producer: Ron Kantor
- Production location: Winnipeg
- Running time: 30 minutes

Original release
- Network: CBC Television
- Release: 5 July – 13 September 1971

Dianne is a Canadian music variety show that aired on CBC Television in 1971.

== Premise ==
This Winnipeg-produced program was hosted by singer Dianne Heatherington and focused on rock music performances. Series regulars included the Merry Go Round and the Dave Shaw Orchestra. Bands and artists such as Brave Belt, Chilliwack, Next, North, Tom Northcott, Sweet Honey Mead and Wild Rice appeared.

== Scheduling ==
This half-hour program was broadcast Mondays at 7:30 p.m. from 5 July to 13 September 1971.
