= Dianne Kornberg =

American artist born 1945

Dianne Kornberg (1945) is an American artist.

== Education ==
Kornberg was born in Chicago. She received a BFA degree in painting in 1967 and a Master of Fine Arts in painting in 1970, both from Indiana University.

== Work ==
Kornberg is known for her photographs and prints of bones and archival artifacts. Her work is included in the collections of the Portland Art Museum, the Henry Art Gallery, the Seattle Art Museum, the Princeton University Art Museum and the U.S. Department of State.
