= Transfinite interpolation =

In numerical analysis, transfinite interpolation is a means to construct functions over a planar domain in such a way that they match a given function on the boundary. This method is applied in geometric modelling and in the field of finite element method.

The transfinite interpolation method, first introduced by William J. Gordon and Charles A. Hall, receives its name due to how a function belonging to this class is able to match the primitive function at a nondenumerable number of points. In the authors' words:

We use the term 'transfinite' to describe the general class of interpolation schemes studied herein since, unlike the classical methods of higher dimensional interpolation which match the primitive function F at a finite number of distinct points, these methods match F at a non-denumerable (transfinite) number of points.

Transfinite interpolation is similar to the Coons patch, invented in 1967.

== Formula ==
With parametrized curves $\vec{c}_1(u)$, $\vec{c}_3(u)$ describing one pair of opposite sides of a domain, and $\vec{c}_2(v)$, $\vec{c}_4(v)$ describing the other pair. the position of point (u,v) in the domain is

$\begin{array}{rcl} \vec{S}(u,v)&=&(1-v)\vec{c}_1(u)+v\vec{c}_3(u)+(1-u)\vec{c}_2(v)+u\vec{c}_4(v)\\ && - \left[ (1-u)(1-v)\vec{P}_{1,2}+uv\vec{P}_{3,4}+u(1-v)\vec{P}_{1,4}+(1-u)v\vec{P}_{3,2} \right] \end{array}$

where, e.g., $\vec{P}_{1,2}$ is the point where curves $\vec{c}_1$ and $\vec{c}_2$ meet.
