= Dianne M. Stewart =

Dianne Marie Stewart is Samuel Candler Dobbs Professor of Religion and African American Studies at Emory University. Stewart's work focuses on religion, culture and African heritage in the Caribbean and the Americas as well as womanist religious thought and praxis. Dianne M. Stewart is the author of Three Eyes for the Journey: African Dimensions of the Jamaican Religious Experience (Oxford University Press, 2005), Black Women, Black Love: America’s War on African American Marriage (Seal Press, 2020) and Obeah, Orisa and Religious Identity in Trinidad, Volume II, Orisa: Africana Nations and the Power of Black Sacred Imagination (Duke University Press, 2022).

== Personal life ==
Dianne M. Stewart was born in Kingston, Jamaica, and grew up in Hartford, CT, USA. In 1990, Stewart obtained her B.A. degree from Colgate University in English and African American Studies. In 1993, she obtained her Masters of Divinity in theology and culture, specializing in African American Religious Thought from the Harvard Divinity School. In 1997, she received a Ph.D. in systematic theology, specializing in African Diaspora Religious Thought & Cultures from Union Theological Seminary in New York City.

Stewart studied with scholars including Delores Williams, James Washington and her adviser James Cone.

== Career ==
From 1998 to 2001, Stewart was an assistant professor of religious studies at College of the Holy Cross. From 1997 to 1998, Stewart was a visiting professor at Macalester College. In 2001, she joined Emory's faculty, and is currently Samuel Candler Dobbs Professor of Religion and African American studies. where she teaches undergraduate and graduate courses focused on African American/diaspora, religion, and culture.

=== Publications ===
Stewart's first monograph was titled, "Three Eyes for the Journey: African Dimensions of the Jamaican Religious Experience" and analyzed the motif of liberation in African heritage from the 18th to 21st century.

=== Awards and Fellowships ===
Stewart received the Emory College of Arts and Sciences' Distinguished Advising Award, the Emory University Laney Graduate School's Eleanor Main Graduate Faculty Mentor Award, and a Senior Fellowship at the Bill and Carol Fox Center for Humanistic Inquiry.

=== Committees ===
Stewart is a member of the executive board, ASWAD

=== Fieldwork ===
Stewart uses transdisciplinary methods in her research, including the collection of qualitative data which includes ethnographic field work. The focus of her research is African religions and the practices and religious thought of African-descended people in the regions of Anglophone Caribbean and the United States.
