= Dian (surname) =

Dian is a surname. Notable people with the surname include:

- Diarmait Dian (died 689), an Irish king
- Michal Dian (born 1981), Slovak footballer
- Padmini Dian (born 1986), Indian politician
- Dian Wei (died 197), a general who served the Chinese warlord Cao Cao
