= Dianne Woody =

Washington State politician

Dianne H. Woody

Member of the Washington Senate from the 39th district
- In office September 27, 1977 – January 13, 1985
- Preceded by: Frank Woody
- Succeeded by: Cliff Bailey

Personal details
- Died: July 9, 2016
- Party: Democratic
- Spouse: Frank Woody
- Education: Western Washington University (BA); University of Washington (post-graduate studies)
- Occupation: Social worker; small business proprietor

Dianne H. Woody (died July 9, 2016) was an American politician who served as a member of the Washington State Senate from 1977 to 1985. She represented Washington's 39th legislative district as a Democrat. Her husband, Frank, held the seat before her from 1973 until his death in 1977, about half a year into his second term. Upon Frank's death, Diane was appointed to fill the vacancy and went on to win a special election to serve out the remainder of Frank's unexpired term. She then won reelection in the regular election of 1981 and served out the term, ending in 1985.
