= Dianne Bevelander =

South African academic (1959–2021)

Dianne Lynne Bevelander
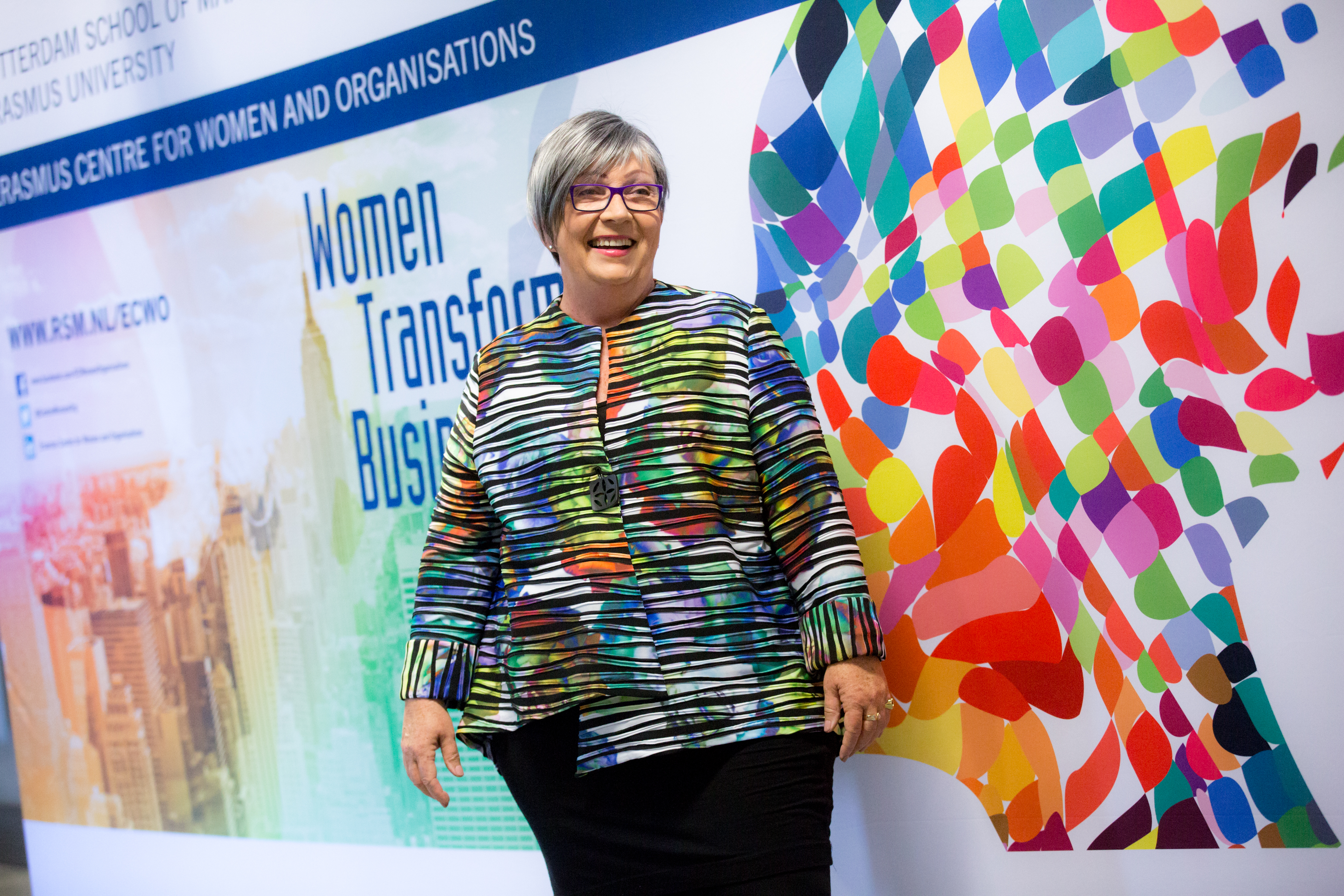
- Born: Dianne Lynne Bevelander; 17 June 1959; Durban, South Africa
- Died: 29 August 2021 (aged 62)
- Education: BA, University of South Africa; MBA, University of Cape Town; PhD, University of Luleå
- Alma mater: University of South Africa; University of Cape Town; University of Luleå
- Occupation: Academic
- Employer(s): Rotterdam School of Management, Erasmus University
- Known for: Founder of the Erasmus Centre for Women and Organisations (ECWO); Gender equality advocacy in management education
- Title: Professor of Management Education (Women in Business)
- Awards: FAME Athena Award (2019)

Dianne Lynne Bevelander (born in Durban, South Africa, 17 June 1959 – 29 August 2021) was a South African academic. She was the founder and executive director of the Erasmus Centre for Women and Organisations (ECWO) and Professor of Management Education with a focus on Women in Business at Rotterdam School of Management, Erasmus University (RSM). She was a pioneer of gender equality there, as she established the first all-women leadership elective as part of RSM's MBA programmes in 2011. She founded ECWO in 2014 as a centre of teaching, research and advocacy, focusing on redressing the gender imbalance in organisations and empowering women to reach their full potential and drive change in society.

== Early life and education ==
Bevelander spent the formative years of her life in the South African coastal city of Durban. She attended Grosvenor Girls High School and worked in administration at Technikon Mangosuthu (renamed the Mangosuthu University of Technology) before earning a BA in Sociology and Philosophy from the University of South Africa (Unisa). She obtained her MBA from the University of Cape Town, South Africa before gaining a Ph.D. from the University of Lulea, Sweden. She was appointed Professor of Management Education with a focus on Women in Business at RSM in 2014. On February 5, 2016, she delivered her inaugural address entitled The 8th Summit: Women’s Ascent of Organisations. In 2014 she founded ECWO.

== Career ==
In 2004, Bevelander was appointed executive director of MBA Programmes at RSM, a position she held until 2007. In 2008, she was appointed Associate Dean of the MBA Programmes. During the nearly seven years in that position, she began her pioneering role in organisational gender equality in society and leading the drive for women empowerment at the RSM and across the broader Erasmus University.

Leading through innovation, Bevelander designed a women's only elective at RSM focusing on the empowerment of women aspiring to leadership roles using the mountain (Mount Kilimanjaro in Tanzania) as an outside classroom, and as a metaphor for business. The first elective ran in September 2011.

Bevelander established ECWO with a mandate to conduct research, offer executive development programmes, and engage in advocacy. In her role as executive director, Bevelander developed and ran Women in Leadership executive courses and masterclasses at RSM and other institutions, including at the Dutch Finance Ministry in March 2021.

Teaching highlights include developing the curricula and serving as the lead faculty for the personal leadership development across the full portfolio of MBA programs and teaching leadership development and managing people for students and executives across five continents.

ECWO's mandate is to conduct research, offer executive development programmes, and engage in advocacy. Bevelander was instrumental in securing a 3 million European Union grant to work on removing barriers to the recruitment, retention, and career progression of female researchers through the EQUAL4EUROPE project.

== Research ==
Bevelander's primary research interests related to management education and diversity with a particular emphasis on the career development of professional women. She was published in Harvard Business Review, among others. In January 2020 Dianne was profiled in Harper's Bazaar in an issue that focused on women leaders, and she was featured in Forbes, The New York Times, Huffington Post and Business Week.

== Awards ==
Bevelander won the Female Academics Moving toward Equity (FAME) Athena Award during Erasmus University's 106th Dies Natalis on Friday, 8 November 2019. The award honours university staff members who have made an exceptional effort to promote female talent – and who have set a fine example for their colleagues in the process. Bevelander was honoured for her “determination and consistency of purpose in changing mindsets in business and management, and in the school. She was instrumental in RSM integrating equality and empowerment as an aspect of leadership into its education and research."
