= Dianne Welsh =

Professor of entrepreneurship

Dianne H.B. Welsh is the Hayes Distinguished Professor at the University of North Carolina at Greensboro. She is known for her work in establishing new programs in training entrepreneurs and developing university curricula on entrepreneurship.

== Education and career ==
Welsh has a B.A. from the University of Iowa (1978), an M.S. Emporia State University (1984), and a Ph.D. from the University of Nebraska–Lincoln (1988). She has worked at multiple universities including Eastern Washington University, where she was promoted to professor in 1997. From 2005 until 2008 she was the Walter Chair in Entrepreneurship at the University of Tampa, and in 2008 she was named the Hayes Distinguished Professor at the University of North Carolina at Greensboro.

Welsh is known for her work in developing university programs on entrepreneurship. To meet this objective she co-authored the fourth edition of Global Entrepreneurship and the accompanying Global Entrepreneurship Case Studies. Welsh has launched three entrepreneurship centers/programs, at John Carroll University, the University of Tampa, and the University of North Carolina Greensboro. From 2013 until 2014 she was the president of the Small Business Institute.

== Selected publications ==
- Global entrepreneurship. Dianne H. B. Welsh, Shawn Carraher (Third ed.). Dubuque, IA. 2018. ISBN 978-1-5249-5048-4. OCLC 1023601087.
- Welsh, Dianne; Carraher, Shawn (2021). Case studies in global entrepreneurship (Third ed.). Dubuque, IA. ISBN 9781792436659.
- Welsh, Dianne H. B.; Alon, Ilan; Falbe, Cecilia M. (2006). "An Examination of International Retail Franchising in Emerging Markets". Journal of Small Business Management. 44 (1): 130–149. doi:10.1111/j.1540-627x.2006.00158.x. ISSN 0047-2778. S2CID 154592685.
- Welsh, Dianne H. B.; Luthans, Fred; Sommer, Steven M. (1993-02-01). "Managing Russian Factory Workers: The Impact of U.S.–Based Behavioral and Participative Techniques". Academy of Management Journal. 36 (1): 58–79. doi:10.5465/256512. ISSN 0001-4273.
- Luthans, Fred; Welsh, Dianne H. B.; Rosenkrantz, Stuart A. (1993). "What Do Russian Managers Really Do? An Observational Study with Comparisons to U.S. Managers". Journal of International Business Studies. 24 (4): 741–761. doi:10.1057/palgrave.jibs.8490253. ISSN 0047-2506. S2CID 2875556.
- Welsh, Dianne H. B.; Memili, Esra; Kaciak, Eugene; Al Sadoon, Aliyah (2014-05-01). "Saudi women entrepreneurs: A growing economic segment". Journal of Business Research. 67 (5): 758–762. doi:10.1016/j.jbusres.2013.11.040. ISSN 0148-2963.

== Honors and awards ==
She was named a Justin Longenecker fellow of the United States' Association for Small Business & Entrepreneurship in 2011, and a fellow of the Small Business Institute in 2017. In 2018, she received the Deshpande Symposium award for Excellence in Curriculum Innovation in Entrepreneurship Award. In 2019 she received the North Carolina Board of Governor award for excellence in teaching, and the Barbara Hollander award for Lifetime Achievement from the Family Firm Institute in 2019. Welsh received the Legacy Award for Lifetime achievement from the Global Consortium of Entrepreneurship Centers in 2020. She won the Outstanding Contributions to Advancing Innovation and Entrepreneurship Award from the Deshpande Foundation in 2021.
