= James Augustus Washington =

James Augustus Washington (8 March 1831, in Goldsboro, North Carolina – 1911), was a Confederate colonel during the American Civil War. He joined the Confederate States Army in April 1861 as a sergeant in the Goldsboro Rifles, which became A company, 27th North Carolina Regiment. He became captain of H company, 2nd North Carolina Regiment 16 May 1861 and Lt. Col. in the 50th North Carolina Regiment on 15 April 1862.

Col. Washington commanded the regiment during Maj. Gen. D. H. Hill's campaign against New Bern and Washington, North Carolina in 1863. He commanded the 50th during Potter's raid in 1863. Col. Washington received a reprimand for his conduct during action around Tarboro during the raid and he resigned his commission.

Before and after the war James Washington worked as a farmer and clerk.
