= Sir Cumference =

Series of educational math books

Sir Cumference is a series of children's educational books about math by Cindy Neuschwander and Wayne Geehan.

The books have been studied for their use in mathematics education.

== Characters ==
Most of the characters of the book are named after math terms, such as Sir Cumference (circumference).

=== Sir Cumference ===
Sir Cumference is a knight in the kingdom of Camelot. He is married to Lady Di of Ameter, with whom he has a son named Radius.

=== Di of Ameter ===
Di of Ameter is married to Sir Cumference. In the first book, she came up with the shapes of the table (parallelogram, square, etc.) and in Sir Cumference and the Dragon of Pi, she stayed with Sir Cumference when he was transformed into a dragon.

=== Radius ===
Radius is the son of Di of Ameter and Sir Cumference. He has a friend named Vertex in Sir Cumference and the Sword in the Cone, and plays an important role in both Sir Cumference and the Dragon of Pi and The Sword in the Cone first by turning his father to a dragon and back, and later assisting Vertex in becoming king. He is the focus of Sir Cumference and the Great Knight of Angleland, in which he becomes a knight after rescuing King Lell and his pair of dragons.

=== Vertex ===
Vertex is the best friend of Radius. Sir Cumference and Radius agree Vertex should be the heir to the throne.

== Series ==
Currently, there are 14 books in the series:

Sir Cumference Classroom Activities (2015)

1. Sir Cumference and the First Round Table (1997)
2. Sir Cumference and the Dragon of Pi (1999)
3. Sir Cumference and the Great Knight of Angleland (2001)
4. Sir Cumference and the Sword in the Cone (2003)
5. Sir Cumference and the Isle of Immeter (2006)
6. Sir Cumference and All the Kings Tens (2009)
7. Sir Cumference and the Viking's Map (2012)
8. Sir Cumference and the Off-the-Charts Dessert (2013)
9. Sir Cumference and the Roundabout Battle (2015)
10. Sir Cumference and the Fracton Faire (2017)
11. Sir Cumference Gets Decima's Point (2020)
12. Sir Cumference and the 100 Percent Goose Chase (2023)
13. Sir Cumference Speaks Volumes (2024)
