= DIANA Mayer & Grammelspacher =

German air gun manufacturer

DIANA Mayer & Grammelspacher GmbH & Co.KG
- Company type: Gesellschaft mit beschränkter Haftung
- Industry: Shooting sports
- Founded: Rastatt, Germany (1890; 136 years ago)
- Founders: Jakob Mayer; Josef Grammelspacher
- Headquarters: Rastatt, Germany
- Key people: Michael Swoboda (CEO); Martin Zedler (MD)
- Products: Air guns
- Owner: German Sport Guns
- Number of employees: 90 (2008)
- Parent: German Sport Guns
- Website: www.diana-airguns.de

DIANA Mayer & Grammelspacher is an air gun manufacturer founded and based in Rastatt, Germany. The company, named after Diana, the mythological goddess of the hunt, is best known for producing quality air rifles.

== History ==
=== Establishment ===
Mayer & Grammelspacher GmbH was founded in Rastatt in 1890 by 24-year old toolmaker Jakob Mayer and financier Josef Grammelspacher, initially focusing on household metal goods. Two years later they introduced their first air gun, a pistol, based on the Haviland & Gunn model of 1872. The first rifle, a break barrel design, followed in 1895. Early products were marked "MGR" (for Mayer, Grammelspacher and Rastatt) before the introduction of the now-famous "Diana" brand name. In 1901 Grammelspacher left the company for reasons unknown, whilst Mayer was awarded his first patent.

=== Initial success ===
A steady stream of improved designs characterized the first decade of the 20th century, culminating in the classic Model 27. This successful model was produced in various forms from 1910 up to 1987. The popularity of shooting as a leisure activity prompted development of a range of children's toy guns (firing arrows tipped with suction cups) under the Eureka brand.

=== WW2 and aftermath ===
The Second World War stymied Diana's early success, with sanctions imposed on the Nazi government severely limiting export opportunities. By 1940 civilian production was halted and the factory was commandeered to produce parts for Mauser, which led to heavy Allied bombing. After the fall of Germany in 1945, the production of arms was outlawed. The occupying forces decommissioned the factory and sold the company lock, stock and barrel to England's Millard Brothers (Milbro), who moved production to Scotland. The sale included all assets, even the trademark "Diana".

=== Not Diana ===
The company formerly known as Diana was allowed to restart production of air guns in 1950, during the reconstruction of Germany. Due to the loss of their trademark, their products were sold under various other names including "Original" in Germany, "Diana Original" in England, Beeman, Hy-Score and Winchester in the US and "GECADO" in the Common Wealth countries. In 1963 they introduced an innovative recoilless air rifle, the Model 60.

=== Restoration ===
In 1984, after almost 40 years, the company finally regained their trademark when Milbro went bust. At the 1988 Summer Olympics a silver medal was won by Silvia Sperber in the Women's 10 metre air rifle event using a Diana rifle. In 1990 the company celebrated their Centenary.

=== Acquisition ===
In 2014 the company was bought by German Sport Guns GmbH.

== Products ==
=== Notable ===
- Diana Model 27 - Classic break barrel spring-piston rifle, sold in various forms from 1910 to 1987
- Diana Model 60 - Early recoilless break barrel spring-piston rifle, sold from 1960 to 1982

=== Earlier ===
Rifles

- Break barrel
  - Diana 24
- Fixed barrel
  - Diana 50
  - Diana 46
  - Diana 430

Diana 35

Pistols

- Break barrel
  - Diana 5
  - Diana SP50

=== Current ===
DRifles

- Break barrel
  - Diana 31
  - Diana 34
- Diana 45
  - Diana 240
  - Diana 250
  - Diana 280
  - Diana 350
- Fixed barrel
  - Side lever
    - Diana 48
    - Diana 56 Th target
    - Diana 54
  - Underlever
    - Diana K98
    - Diana 460 Magnum
    - Diana 470TH Target Hunter
  - Overlever
    - Diana Oktoberfest
- Pre-charged pneumatic
  - Diana P1000 EVO2
  - Diana Outlaw
  - Diana Skyhawk (bullpup)
  - Diana Stormrider

Pistols

- Diana LP8 Magnum
- Diana Bandit

Accessories

- Scopes
- Pellets
- Silhouette targets
- Silencer

== Gallery ==
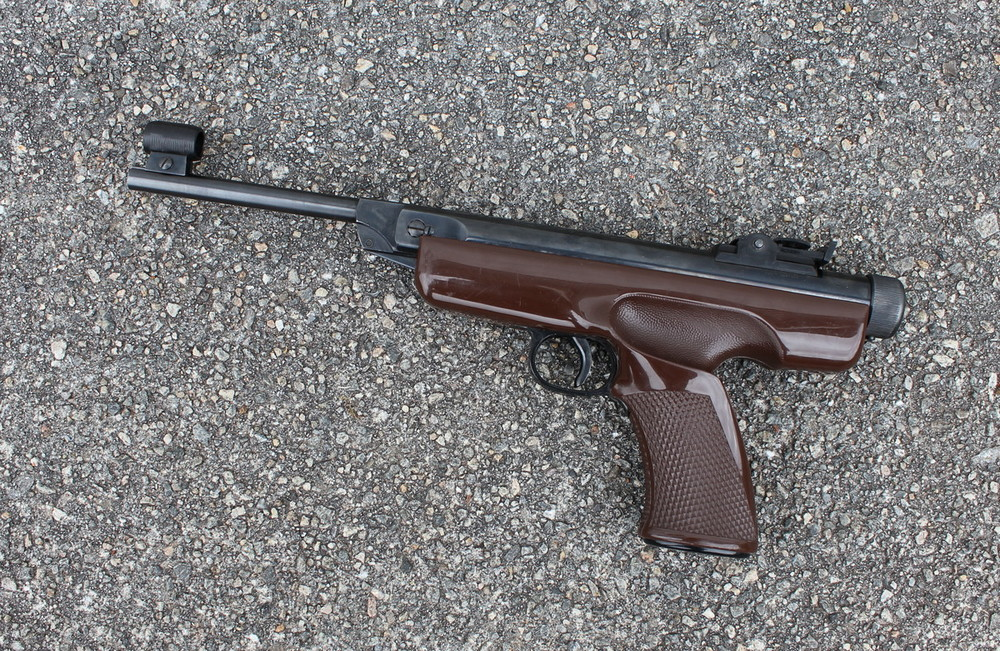
Diana 5 (1978)

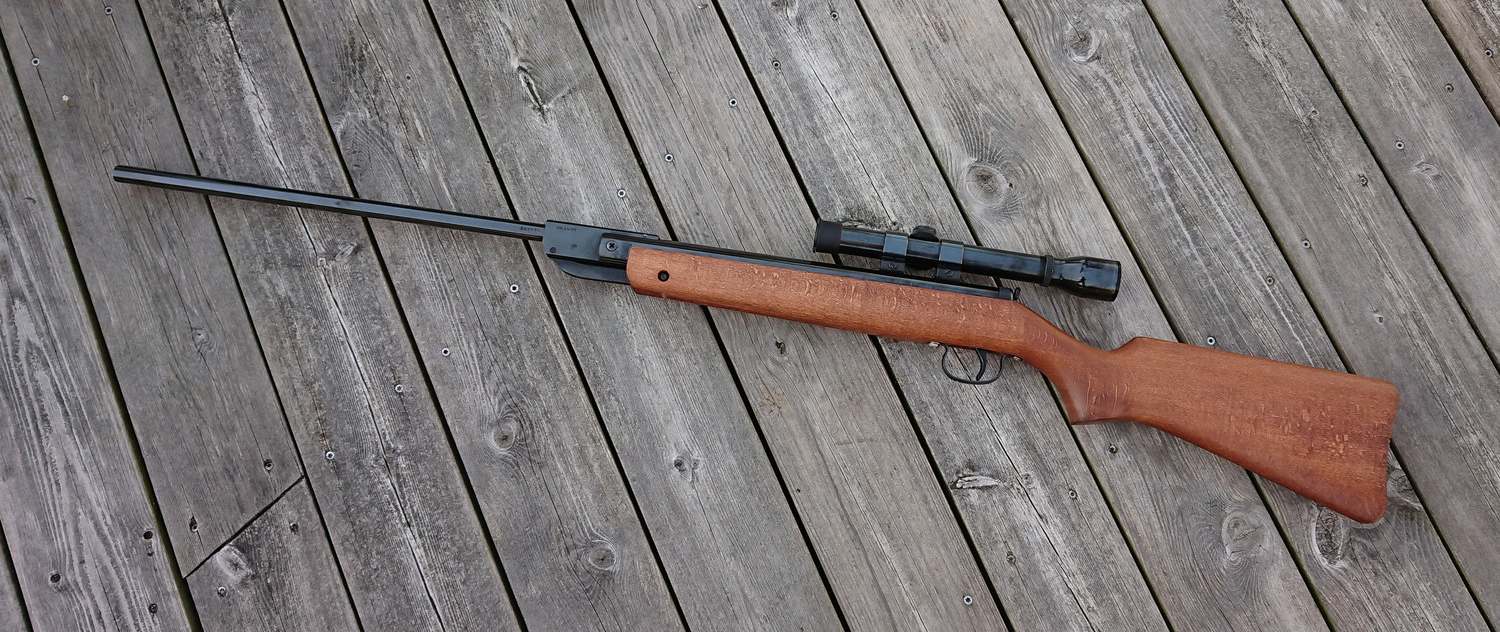
Diana 34 (1988)

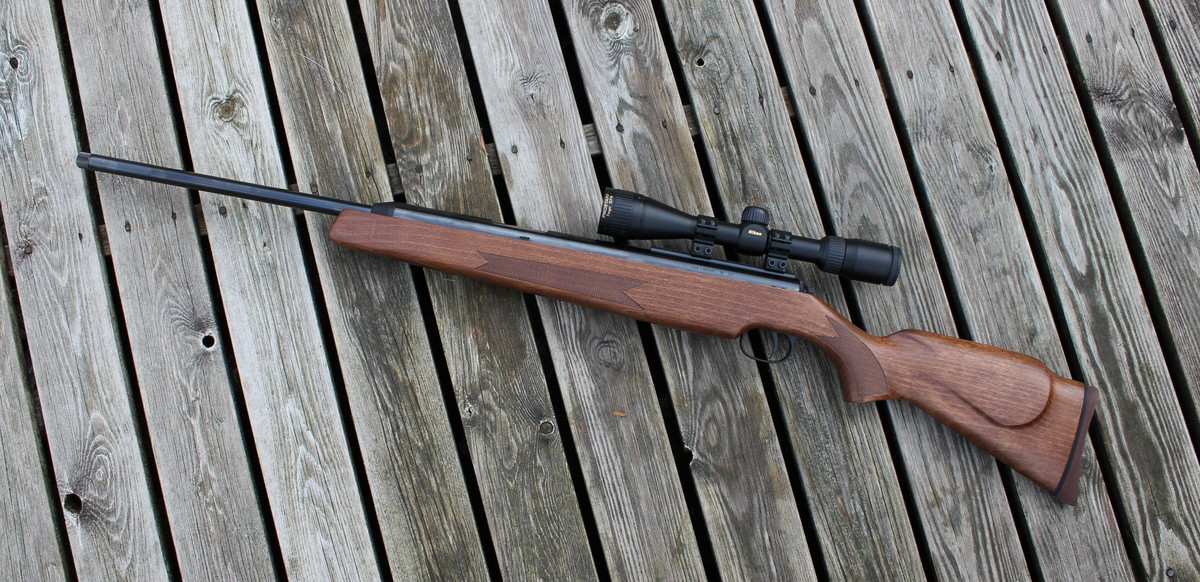
Diana 52

== See also ==
- Feinwerkbau
- Umarex
- Walther
- Weihrauch
