= Dianne Beevers =

Australian sculptor, artist (born 1946)

- Born: 18 December 1946 (age 79); Taree, New South Wales, Australia
- Occupations: Artist, sculptor, jeweller and curator

Dianne Beevers (born 18 December 1946) is an Australian sculptor, artist, jeweller and former lecturer at Box Hill Institute and the Royal Melbourne Institute of Technology, RMIT.

== Early life ==
Dianne Beevers was born in Taree, New South Wales. She studied at the National Art School, Newcastle and the Newcastle Teachers' College between 1964 and 1967. In 1967 she was awarded a Diploma in Art (Education). In 1977 she graduated from the University of Newcastle with a Bachelor of Arts, and obtained a master's degree in Art in Public Space from RMIT in 2006.

== Career ==
During the 1980s Beevers worked in Melbourne as a curator in the Museum of Victoria Children's Museum and in 1988 she worked as a curator on the Royal Exhibition Buildings' presentation of Judy Chicago's Dinner Party in Melbourne. Throughout the 1990s she was on the committee of the Women's Art Register and the Melbourne division of NAVA.

Beevers was part of the "Bad Mothers" group of artists who highlighted the struggles of women who were artists and mothers. This group included other Australian artists such as Charlotte Clemens, Raewyn Rayner, Nicole Newman and Fay Plamka. Exhibitions by the Bad Mothers included one in 1989 at Reconnaissance Galleries Melbourne and one at the Tin Sheds Gallery, University of Sydney in 1990.

Between 2001 and 2003, Beevers worked with local residents, the Pilot Station committee and landscape architect, Rupert Milne Holme, on the Landscape and Heritage Masterplan in Camden, New South Wales.

A major public art installation is her joint work with Andrea Tomaselli Piazza Italia (2006), Lygon Street Carlton sponsored by the City of Milan, "to mark Melbourne’s Sister City Relationship with Milano".

Beevers has an installation in the City of Brimbank titled "Seeds of Hope and Dreams (2011)". This was a collaborative project with Andrea Tomaselli.

In 2019, she won an Australian Design Centre, ADC, Award for "Two Strands of Pearls". The prize for this award was an opportunity to exhibit in the ADC's Object Space, Darlinghurst.

== Notable exhibitions ==
- Rites of passage: a maritime installation, Grand Central Gallery, Melbourne. (1996)
- Archipelago, Space Union Gallery, RMIT. (2000)
- Lend Me Your Ears, Mailbox Art Space. (2011)
- Semi-Precious, The Back Room at Artifice Store. (2013)
- MasterMakers, RMIT Gallery. (2019)

== Publications ==
- Artemis (Journal of the Newcastle Gallery Society), Vol. 9, no.3 Minimal Art: An Introduction Carl Andre – Gallery Installation. (1978)
- Vol 10, no 1., Profile, Summer at Carcoar (Brett Whiteley); Women's Art Directory; Women Artists Represented in the William Bowmore Collection; Rosable Carriera (1675–1757); Marie Laurencin (1885–1956), The Poet's Muse. (1979)
