= Diana (ship) =

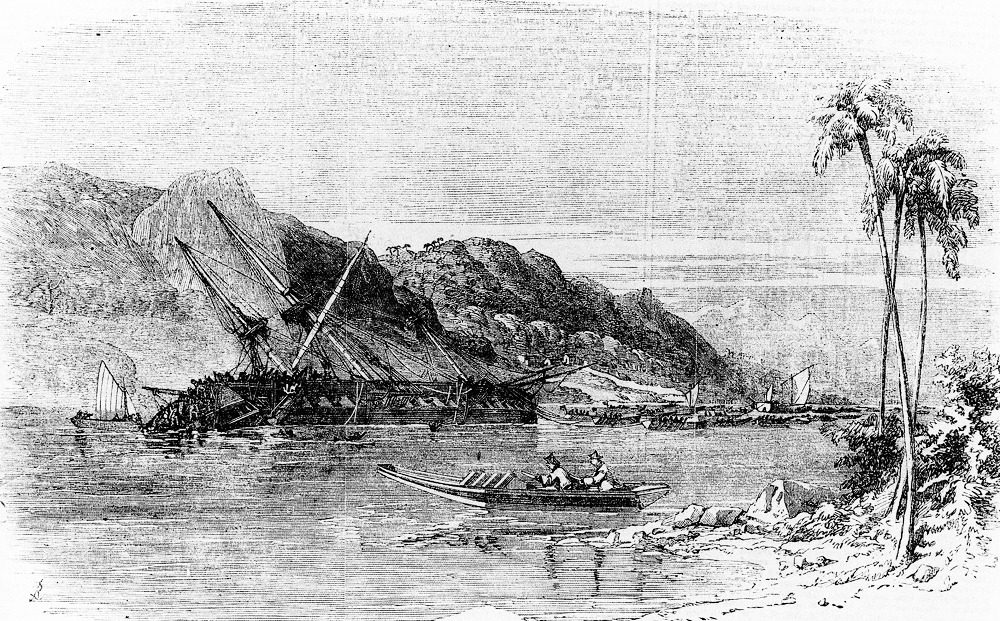
The Russian frigate Diana sinking during the 1854 Ansei-Nankai earthquake in Shimoda harbor

Many vessels have held the name of Diana. They include:

== Merchant vessels ==
- Diana (1774 ship), of 288 tons burthen, was launched at Newbury. Between 1785 and 1794 she was a whaler in the British northern whale fishery, based in Hull. She then became a transport and a Baltic trader, and was last listed in 1801.
- Diana (1799 ship) was launched as a West Indiaman. From 1805 she made four voyages as an East Indiaman under charter to the British East India Company. She made a fifth voyage to India in 1817 under a license from the EIC. She ran into difficulties in the Hooghly River while homeward bound and was condemned in Bengal in June 1818.
- Diana (1799 Topsham ship) was launched as a West Indiaman. In 1802 she wrecked on the Isle of Pines, Cuba.
- Diana (1818 ship), a merchant vessel built at Cochin that wrecked in 1820 while participating in a punitive expedition against pirates at Ras al Khaimah
- Diana (1823) was a steam paddle steamer built as a merchant vessel and purchased by the Bengal Government in 1824. During the First Anglo-Burmese War she became the first steam-powered warship of the Honourable East India Company to see action. She was transferred to the Burmese Government in 1826 and to back to the company for use by Singapore in 1837.
- Diana (1824 ship) was built at Whitby, England. She made a number of voyages between England, India and Quebec with cargo and undertook one voyage transporting convicts to New South Wales. She was last listed in 1848.
- Diana (1840 ship), whaling ship, home port in Hull
- Diana (1871 ship), was a steam screw barque of 341 GRT, built in Drammen. She took part in the 1892 Dundee Whaling Expedition to the Antarctic.
- Diana (HBC vessel), built in 1880, see Hudson's Bay Company vessels

== Naval vessels ==
- HMS Diana - any of 10 ships of the Royal Navy
- Italian aviso Diana, an aviso of the Italian Regia Marina
- Diana (1799) was a frigate of 4 guns the Dutch Navy purchased in 1799. The British Royal Navy captured her in 1804
- Russian frigate Diana, an early 19th-century navy vessel
- Russian cruiser Diana (1899), a cruiser of the Imperial Russian Navy
