= Coons patch =

Type of surface patch used in computer graphics

Sample Coons patch

In mathematics, a Coons patch, is a type of surface patch or manifold parametrization used in computer graphics to smoothly join other surfaces together, and in computational mechanics applications, particularly in finite element method and boundary element method, to mesh problem domains into elements.

Coons patches are named after Steven Anson Coons, and date to 1967.

== Bilinear blending ==
Given four space curves c_{0}(s), c_{1}(s), d_{0}(t), d_{1}(t) which meet at four corners c_{0}(0) = d_{0}(0), c_{0}(1) = d_{1}(0), c_{1}(0) = d_{0}(1), c_{1}(1) = d_{1}(1); linear interpolation can be used to interpolate between c_{0} and c_{1}, that is

$$L_c(s,t)=(1-t) c_0(s)+ t c_1(s)$$

and between d_{0}, d_{1}

$$L_d(s,t)=(1-s) d_0(t)+ s d_1(t)$$

producing two ruled surfaces defined on the unit square.

The bilinear interpolation on the four corner points is another surface

$$B(s,t) = c_0(0) (1-s)(1-t) + c_0(1) s(1-t) + c_1(0) (1-s)t + c_1(1) s t.$$

A bilinearly blended Coons patch is the surface

$$C(s,t)=L_c(s,t)+L_d(s,t)-B(s,t).$$

== Bicubic blending ==
Although the bilinear Coons patch exactly meets its four boundary curves, it does not necessarily have the same tangent plane at those curves as the surfaces to be joined, leading to creases in the joined surface along those curves. To fix this problem, the linear interpolation can be replaced with cubic Hermite splines with the weights chosen to match the partial derivatives at the corners. This forms a bicubically blended Coons patch.

== See also ==
- Surface
- Atlas (topology)
- Interpolation
- Transfinite interpolation
