= James Melvin Washington =

American historian

James Melvin Washington (April 24, 1948 – May 3, 1997) was an African-American historian, educator, and minister.

== Life and career ==
Originally from Knoxville, Tennessee, with two sisters and three brothers, he was the child of a laborer and a housekeeper.

A 1972 graduate of the University of Tennessee, he received a master's degree at the Harvard Divinity School. His doctorate was from Yale Divinity School in 1979. The title of his dissertation: "The Origins and Emergence of Black Baptist Separatism, 1863-1897."

Further development of its themes resulted in his 1991 book Frustrated Fellowship. It starts in the 1780s. The divide in status between slave and free was a stumbling block to mixed-race congregations. This tense friction continually pitted faith against injustice. The book addresses the trend, following the civil war, toward self-sufficient autonomy in the Black church. The failure of Reconstruction dashed Black hopes of social parity and justice, which were met with violence and terror. Black resolve relied instead on inner resources, the spiritual power of prayer.

Washington later remarked on the extraordinary patience of the Black church, as he told a journalist, "Between 1889 and 1920 there were 3,900 black people lynched and burned in this country. That's almost one a week. That's terrorism."

His first book in 1986 was a well-research, 702-page collection of writings and speeches of Martin Luther King Jr. Included were newspaper and magazine pieces from the midst of the struggle, various interviews, and articles from academic and religious journals. Selected passages from King's five books fill the last third of the volume. It was later reissued.

Starting in 1976 professor Washington taught church history at the Union Theological Seminary. He taught as well at neighboring Columbia University. He became in demand as a visiting professor, teaching at Haverford College, Oberlin College, and Princeton University. As a minister he served on the board of the American Baptist Church, and also of the National Council of Churches. He was active at the Riverside Church in New York City, under the Rev. Dr. James A. Forbes Jr. Forbes called his 1994 book "a source of inspiration to many" as it reflected "the dignity and power of the African-American religious heritage."

Conversations with God (1994) surprisingly became a bestseller. The book presented passages from the prayers of 190 Blacks. Among them were Frederick Douglass and poet Paul Lawrence Dunbar, W. E. B. Du Bois, Sojourner Truth, professor Howard Thurman, poet Esther Popel, Martin Luther King Jr. and James Baldwin, writer Alice Walker and James Alexander Forbes Jr. Many of the quotations given were by relatively unknown Christians, from various points along the difficult and painful, yet blessed history of the Black American church.

At the Riverside Church, Washington would join Cornel West for a daily lunch 'seminar'. "Jim was my best friend for twenty years," wrote West following his friend's death. Often James Forbes joined them for the lunch and table talk.

"We intensely debated the meaning of the Cross-the whence and whither of evil, the sources of struggle against suffering, and the mysterious grounds of hope. We favored those existential thinkers of lived experience-those who thought and lived with compassion and concern about death, despair, and injustice without the crutches of dogma or doctrine... . And we always rooted our fierce exchanges in the concrete reality of everyday Black people dealing with the absurdities and indignities of American life."

He died of a stroke suffered at home. Prof. Washington was survived by Patricia his wife of 26 years and Ayanna his daughter. His family had made their home in Morningside Heights.

== Bibliography ==
Books

- Editor: Testament of Hope. The essential writings of Martin Luther King, Jr. (San Francisco: Harper & Row 1986);
  reissued by Harper in 1992 as I Have a Dream: Writings and Speeches That Changed the World.
- Frustrated Fellowship: The Black Baptist Quest for Social Power (Macon: Mercer University 1991, 2004).
- Editor: Conversations with God. Two centuries of African American prayers (Harpercollins 1994).

Articles

- “Black Religion and American Evangelicalism,” Church History 45/1 (1976): 118–19.
- "The origins of Black evangelicalism and the ethical function of evangelical cosmology" in Union Seminary Quarterly Review 52/2 (1977): 104–116.
- “Black Apostles, Afro-American Clergy Confront the Twentieth Century,” Theology Today 36/4 (1980): 603–5.
- “Without Help or Hindrance: Religious Identity in American Culture,” Foundations 24/1 (1981): 87–89.
- “The Difficulty of Going Home: Reflections on Race and Modernity,” The Christian Century 101/25 (1984): 774–77.
- “Jesse Jackson and the Symbolic Politics of Black Christendom,” The Annals of the American Academy of Political and Social Science 480 (1985): 89–105.
- "The Grace of Interruptions: Toward a new vision of Christian history" in Union Seminary Quarterly Review 42/4 (1988): 37–53.
- “Retelling Carter Woodson's Story: Archival Sources for Afro-American Church History,” The Journal of American History 77/1 (1990): 183–99.
- "The crisis in the sanctity of conscience in America jurisprudence" in DePaul Law Review 42/1 (1992): 11–60.
- “John Wesley Edward Bowen, Sr: The Public Theodicy of an African-American Theological Educator, 1887-1915,” Union Seminary Quarterly Review 47.3–4 (1993): 101–36.
- “Prayer in The Midst of Crisis,” The Living Pulpit 2.3 (1993): 8.
- “The Preciousness of Jesus And The Disinherited,” The Living Pulpit 3.1 (1994): 26–27.
- "Craven Images: The eiconics of race in the crisis of American church historiography" in The Agitated Mind of God. The theology of Kosuke Koyama (Maryknoll: Orbis Press 1996), edited by Akinade and Irvin.
- “Baptist Amnesia: Why Is There No Tombstone for the Black Baptist Tradition?,” American Baptist Quarterly 26.1 (2007): 44–62.

Posthumous Festschrift

- Quinton Hosford Dixie and Cornel West, editors,
  The Courage to Hope: From Black Suffering to Human Redemption: Essays in Honor of James Melvin Washington
  (Boston: Beacon Press 1999).
