= Luiz Inácio Lula da Silva =

President of Brazil (2003–2011; since 2023)

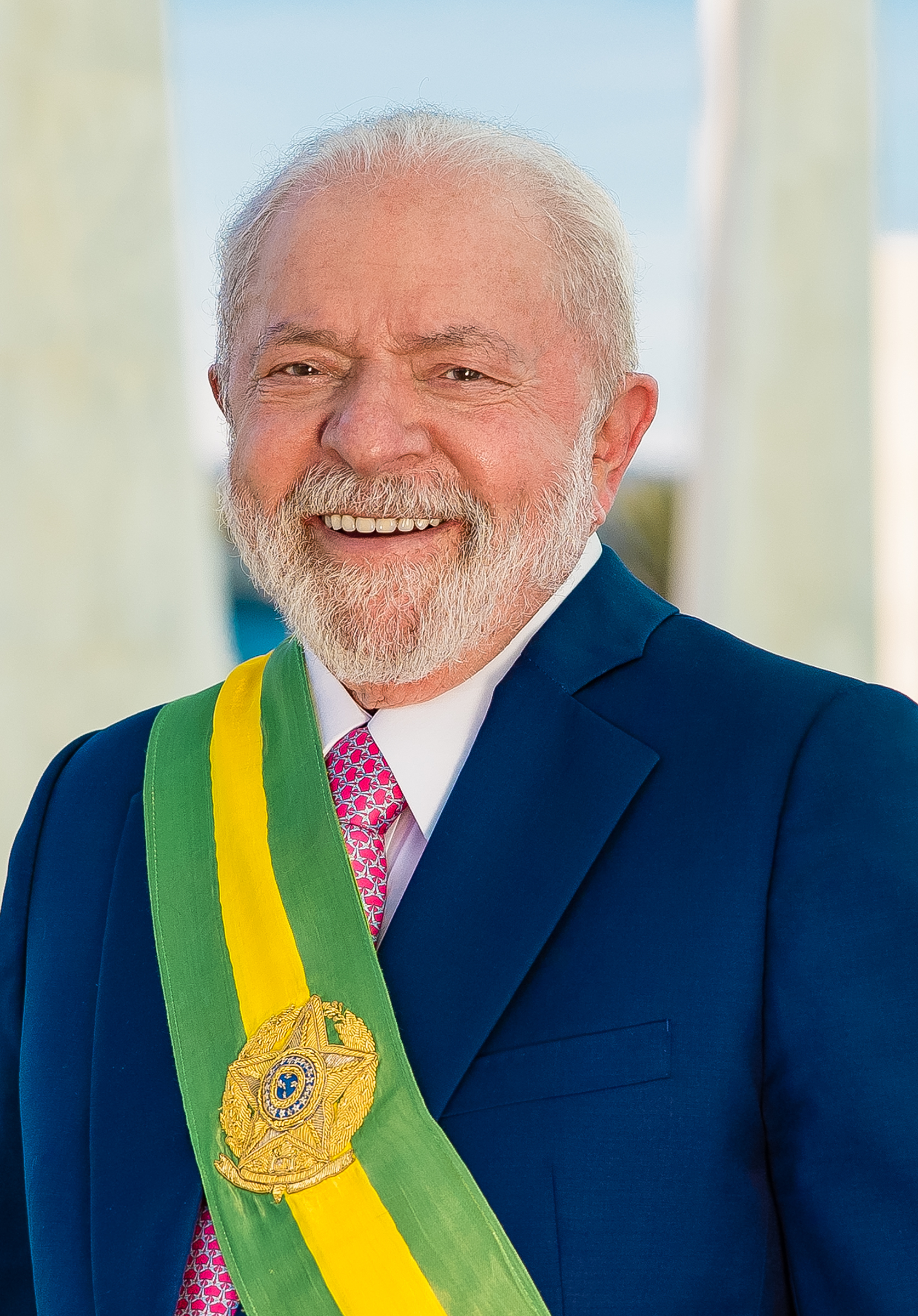
- Official portrait, 2023

35th & 39th President of Brazil
- Incumbent
- Assumed office 1 January 2023
- Vice President: Geraldo Alckmin
- Preceded by: Jair Bolsonaro
- In office 1 January 2003 – 1 January 2011
- Vice President: José Alencar
- Preceded by: Fernando Henrique Cardoso
- Succeeded by: Dilma Rousseff
Legislative and Party offices
National President of the Workers' Party
In office 15 July 1990 – 24 January 1994
Preceded by	Luiz Gushiken
Succeeded by	Rui Falcão
In office 9 August 1980 – 17 January 1988
Preceded by	Office established
Succeeded by	Olívio Dutra
Member of the Chamber of Deputies
In office 1 February 1987 – 1 February 1991 (Note: Lula took a 30-day leave from office on 25 February 1989 to attend to personal affairs.)
Constituency	São Paulo
Union leadership positions
President of the ABC Metalworkers' Union (Note: Until then, the organization was known as the Metalworkers' Union of São Bernardo do Campo and Diadema. In 1993, it merged with the Metalworkers' Union of Santo André, and the resulting organization adopted the name ABC Metalworkers' Union.)
In office 19 April 1975 – 18 April 1981
Preceded by	Paulo Vidal Neto
Succeeded by	Jair Meneguelli
First Secretary of the ABC Metalworkers' Union
In office c. April 1972 – 18 April 1975
President	Paulo Vidal Neto
Preceded by	Unknown
Succeeded by	Paulo Vidal Neto
Alternate Director of the ABC Metalworkers' Union
In office c. April 1969 – c. April 1972
President	Paulo Vidal Neto

Personal details
- Born: Luiz Inácio da Silva; 27 October 1945 (age 81) Garanhuns, Pernambuco, Brazil
- Party: Workers' Party (since 1980)
- Other political affiliations: FE Brasil (since 2022)
- Spouses: Maria de Lourdes Ribeiro (m. 1969; died 1971) Marisa Letícia Casa (m. 1974; died 2017) Rosângela da Silva (m. 2022)
- Children: 5
- Education: National Service for Industrial Training
- Occupation: Politician; metalworker; trade unionist
- Website: lula.com.br
- Lula da Silva's voice Lula da Silva on the taxation of Brazilian products by the United States; Recorded 17 July 2025

Luiz Inácio Lula da Silva (Note: Brazilian Portuguese pronunciation: [luˈiz iˈnasju ˈlulɐ da ˈsiwvɐ].) (born Luiz Inácio da Silva, 27 October 1945), known mononymously as Lula, is a Brazilian politician, trade unionist, and former metalworker who has served as the 39th president of Brazil since 2023. A member of the Workers' Party, he served as the 35th president from 2003 to 2011.

Born in Pernambuco, Lula quit school after second grade to work, and did not learn to read until he was 10 years old. As a teenager, he worked as a metalworker and became a trade unionist. Between 1978 and 1980, he led the ABC workers' strikes during Brazil's military dictatorship, and in 1980, he helped start the Workers' Party during Brazil's redemocratization. Described as left-wing, Lula was one of the leaders of the 1984 Diretas Já movement, which demanded direct elections. In 1986, he was elected a federal deputy in the state of São Paulo. He ran unsuccessfully for president in 1989, in 1994, and 1998. He became president in 2002, in a runoff. In 2006, he was reelected in the second round.

During his first presidency, that coincided with South America's first pink tide, he continued fiscal policies and promoted social welfare programs such as Bolsa Família that led to GDP growth, reduction in external debt and inflation, and helped millions of Brazilians escape poverty. He also played a role in foreign policy, both on a regional level and as part of global trade and environment negotiations. During those terms, Lula was considered one of the most popular politicians in Brazil's history and left office with an 80% approval rating. His first term was also marked by notable corruption scandals, including the Mensalão vote-buying scandal.

After the 2010 election, he was succeeded by his former chief of staff, Dilma Rousseff, and remained active in politics and gave lectures in Brazil and abroad. He attempted to run for president in the 2018 election, but his candidacy was rejected because he was sentenced to prison in connection with Operation Car Wash, in a controversial trial. In 2019, he was released based on a decision by the Supreme Federal Court, which gradually annulled his convictions. With his political rights restored, he ran for president for the sixth time in the 2022 election and defeated the incumbent Jair Bolsonaro in the second round, becoming the first person to defeat a Brazilian president seeking reelection and the first to be elected for a third time. At the age of 77, he became the oldest Brazilian president at time of inauguration. Early in his term, he faced an attempted coup d'état led by Bolsonaro, which failed, and the 8 January 2023 attacks on federal institutions.

During his second presidency, Lula pursued several major institutional and economic reforms, including a landmark tax reform and a new fiscal framework. His government also cut income taxes for the middle class and secured a constitutional amendment reducing the maximum workweek from 44 to 40 hours. The period saw the highest GDP growth in over a decade, along with lower inflation, record-low unemployment and a decline in income inequality. His administration has also prioritized environmental policy, with Amazon deforestation falling to its lowest level in over a decade. It has also renewed international engagement, and led the negotiations that paved the way for the preliminary approval of the Mercosur–European Union trade agreement. In the 2026 election, he defeated Jair's son, Flávio Bolsonaro, becoming the first candidate ever to upset the first-round winner in a presidential election and winning a record-breaking fourth term as president.

== Early life ==
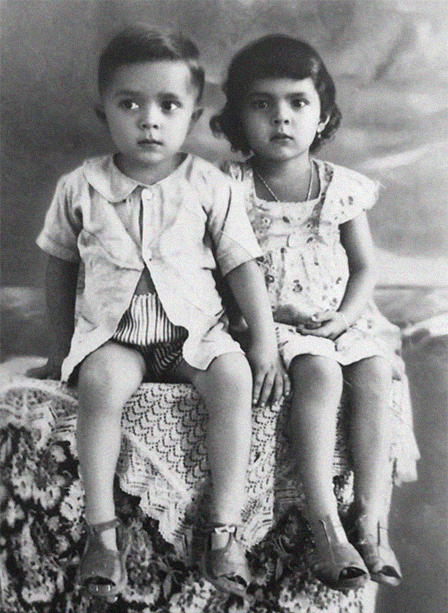
Lula and his sister Maria in 1949

Luiz Inácio da Silva was born on 27 October 1945 (registered with a date of birth of 6 October 1945) in Caetés (then a district of Garanhuns), 250 km (160 mi) from Recife, capital of Pernambuco, a state in the Northeast of Brazil. He was the seventh of eight children of Aristides Inácio da Silva and Eurídice Ferreira de Melo, farmers who had experienced famine in one of the poorest parts of the agreste. He was raised Catholic. Lula's mother was of Portuguese and partial Italian descent. Two weeks after Lula's birth, his father moved to Santos, São Paulo, with – though Eurídice was not aware of it – her younger cousin Valdomira Ferreira de Góis.

In December 1952, when Lula was seven years old, his mother moved the family to São Paulo to rejoin her husband. After a journey of 13 days in a pau-de-arara (open truck bed), they arrived in Guarujá and discovered that Aristides had formed a second family with Valdomira, with whom he had 10 more children. Aristides's two families lived in the same house for some time, but they did not get along very well, and, four years later, his mother moved with Lula and his siblings to a small room behind a bar in São Paulo. After that, Lula rarely saw his father, who died illiterate and an alcoholic in 1978. In 1982, he added the nickname Lula to his legal name.

== Personal life ==
Twice a widower, Lula has been married three times, and has a daughter from a fourth relationship. In 1969, he married Maria de Lourdes Ribeiro. She died of hepatitis in 1971 while pregnant with a child, who also died.

In March 1974, Lula had a daughter, Lurian, with his then-girlfriend, Miriam Cordeiro. The two never married. Lula only began participating in his daughter's life when she was already a young adult.

Two months later, in May 1974, Lula married Marisa Letícia Rocco Casa, a 24-year-old widow whom he had met the prior year. He had three sons with her, and adopted her son from her first marriage. The two remained married for 43 years, until her death on 2 February 2017, after a stroke.

Later that same year, he met and started a relationship with Rosângela da Silva, known as Janja. The relationship only became public in 2019 while he was serving time in jail in Curitiba, Paraná, on corruption charges. Lula and Janja married on 18 May 2022.

Lula is Catholic and supporter of the football club SC Corinthians Paulista.

== Education and work ==
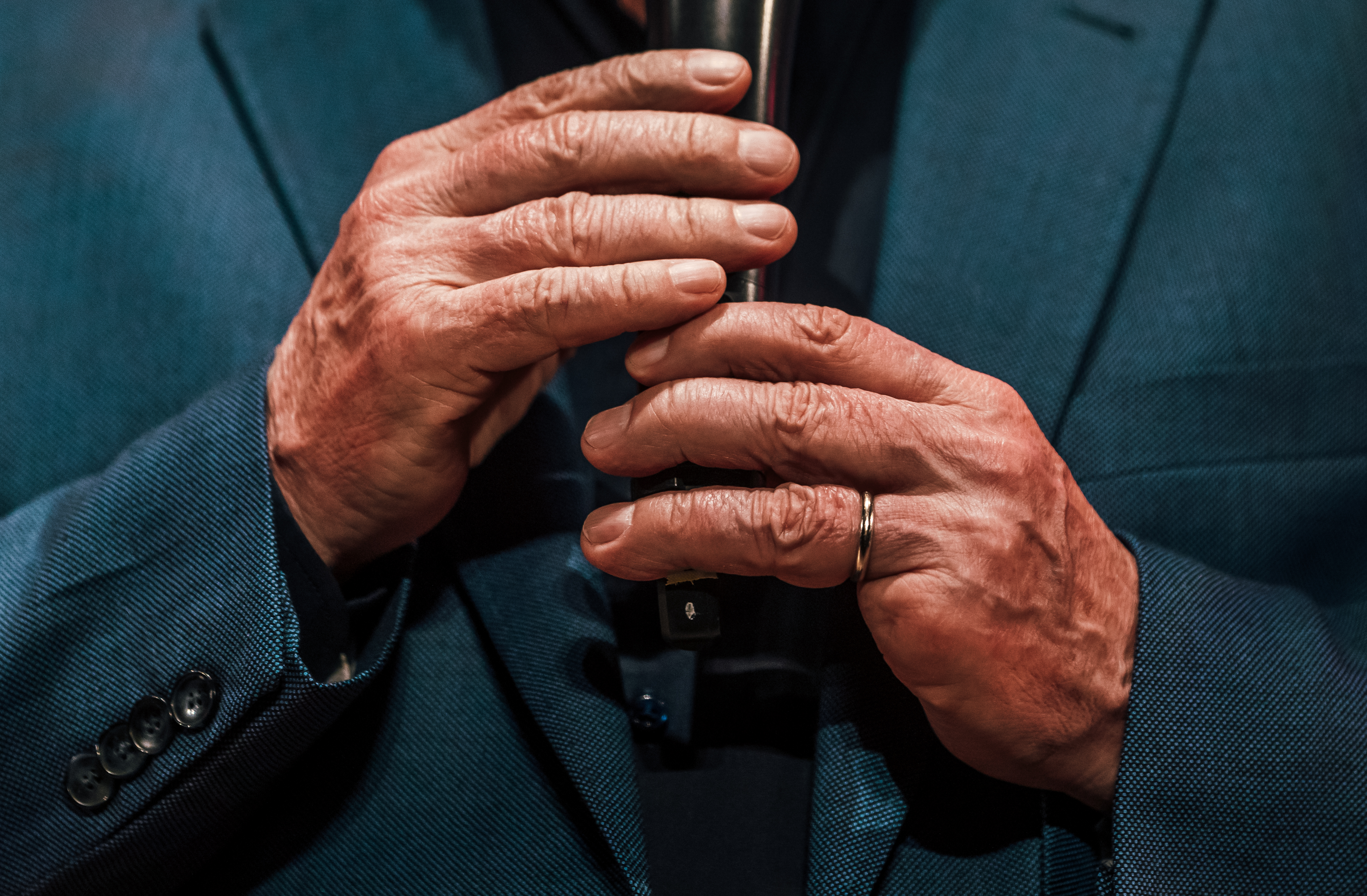
Lula had his left little finger amputated after a work-related accident when he was a metalworker in 1964.

Lula had little formal education. He did not learn to read until he was ten years old. He quit school after the second grade to work. His first job at age eight was as a street vendor. When he was 12, he also worked as a shoeshiner. In 1960, when he was 14, he got his first formal job, in a warehouse.

In 1961, he started working as an apprentice of a press operator in a metallurgical company that produced screws, while studying in a vocational course. There, Lula had his first contact with strike movements. After the movement failed in its negotiations, Lula left the company for another metallurgical company. From 1966 to 1980, he worked at Villares Metals S.A, a new metalworking firm.

There, in 1964, at the age of 19, he lost his left pinky finger in a machinery accident, while working as a press operator in the factory. After the accident, he had to run to several hospitals before he received medical attention. This experience increased his interest in participating in the Workers' Union. Around that time, he became involved in union activities and held several union posts.

== Union career ==
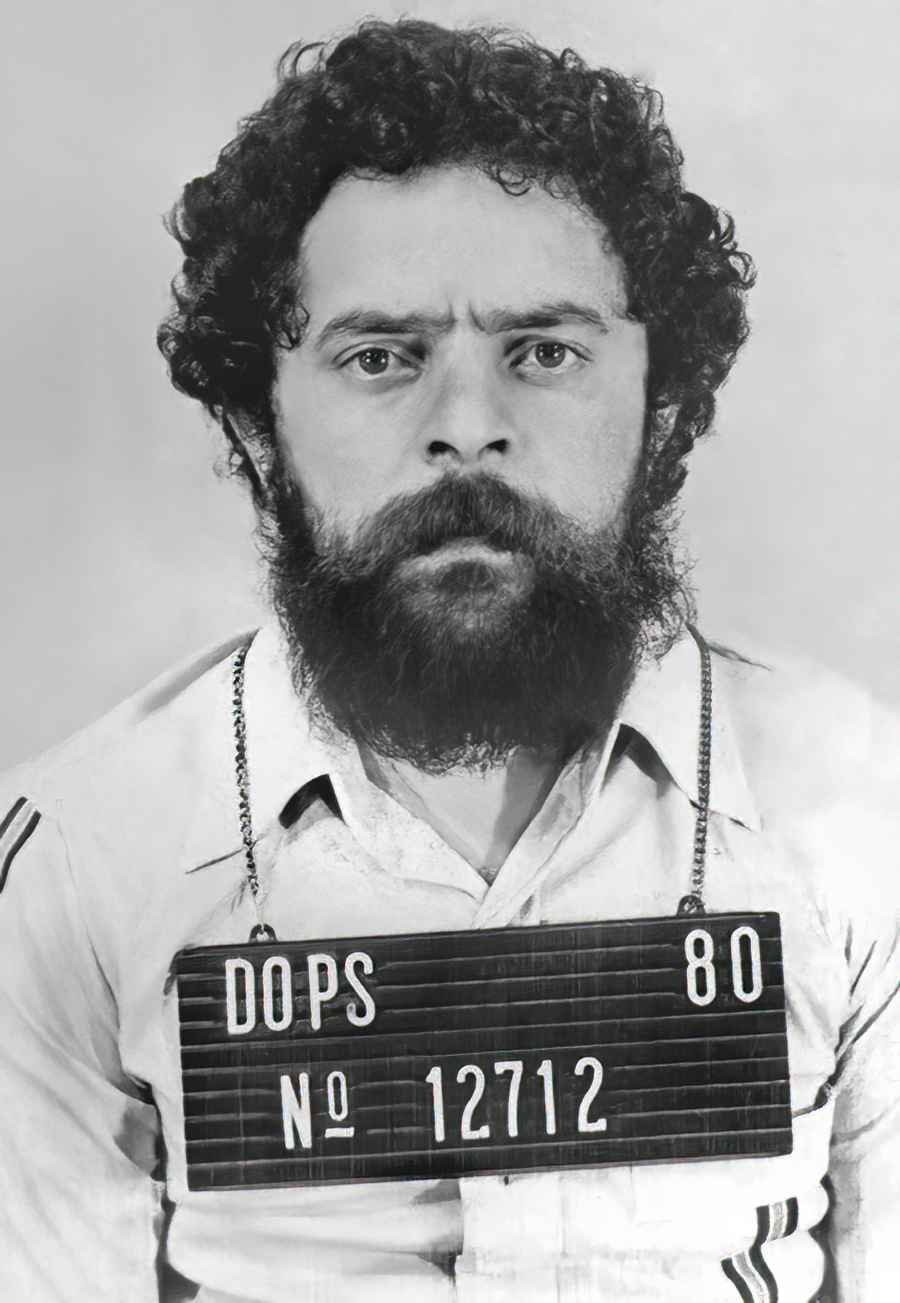
Lula's DOPS mugshot, 1980

Inspired by his brother Frei Chico, a member of the Brazilian Communist Party, Lula joined the labour movement when he worked at Villares Metals, rising through the ranks. He was elected in 1975, and re-elected in 1978, as president of the ABC Metalworkers' Union of São Bernardo do Campo and Diadema. Both cities are located in the ABCD Region, home to most of Brazil's automobile manufacturing facilities, including Ford, Volkswagen, Toyota, and Mercedes-Benz.

In the late 1970s, when Brazil was under military rule, Lula helped organize union activities, including major strikes. Labour courts found the strikes illegal, and in 1980, Lula was jailed for a month. Due to this, and like other people imprisoned for political activities under the military government, Lula was awarded a lifetime pension after the fall of the military regime.

== Political career ==
On 10 February 1980, a group of academics and union leaders, including Lula, founded the Partido dos Trabalhadores (PT) or Workers' Party, a left-wing party with progressive ideas. In 1983, he helped found the Central Única dos Trabalhadores (CUT) trade union association.

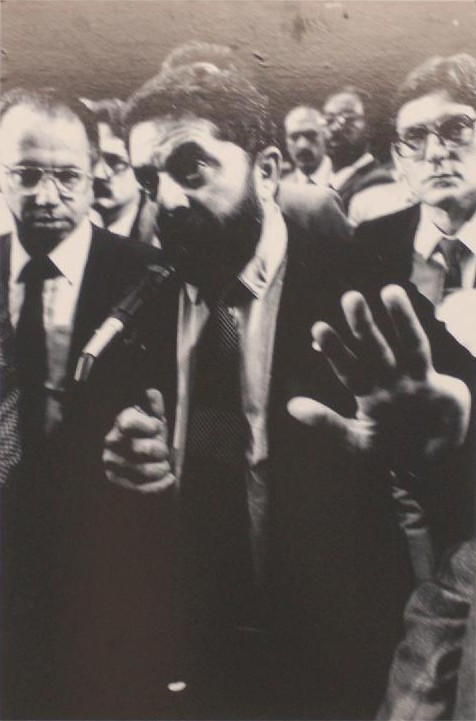
Lula speaking at the plenary of the Chamber of Deputies, 1989

=== Elections ===
Lula first ran for office in 1982 for the state government of São Paulo, but lost with 11% of the vote. Cuban president Fidel Castro urged him to continue on as a politician, during a trip by Lula to Cuba. In the 1986 election, Lula won a seat in the National Congress with the most votes nationwide.

In 1989, Lula ran for president as the PT candidate. Lula advocated immediate land reform and that Brazil default on its external debt. A minor candidate, Fernando Collor de Mello, quickly amassed support with a more business-friendly agenda and by taking emphatic anti-corruption positions. He beat Lula in the second round of the 1989 elections. Lula decided not to run for re-election as a Congressman in 1990.

Lula ran again for president in the next two Brazilian elections. Former PSDB Minister of Finance Fernando Henrique Cardoso defeated Lula in a single round each time. Lula received only 27% of the vote in the presidential elections in 1994, and garnered only 32% of the vote in 1998.

An article in The Washington Post said that before 2002, Lula had been a "strident union organizer known for his bushy beard and Che Guevara T-shirts". In the 2002 campaign, Lula abandoned both his informal clothing style and his platform plank that Brazil should not pay its foreign debt unless it links the payment to a prior thorough audit. This last point had worried economists, businessmen, and banks, who feared that even a partial Brazilian default would have a massive ripple effect through the world economy. In the 2002 election, Lula led his nearest challenger, PSDB candidate José Serra by a nearly 2-to-1 margin in the first round. He soundly defeated Serra in a runoff, to become the country's first leftist president following the fall of the military dictatorship in Brazil. In the 2006 election, Lula won a run-off over the PSDB's Geraldo Alckmin.

In September 2018, Brazil's top electoral court banned Lula from running for president in 2018 due to his corruption conviction, in accordance with Brazil's Lei da Ficha Limpa law. Instead, Fernando Haddad ran for president on the Workers Party ticket, and was defeated by Jair Bolsonaro.

=== Electoral history ===
Year	Election	Party	Office	Coalition	Partners	Party	Votes	Percent	Result
1982	State Elections of São Paulo	PT	Governor	—N/a	Hélio Bicudo	PT	1,144,648	10.77%	Not elected
1986	Parliamentary Elections	PT	Federal Deputy	—N/a			651,763	4.22%	Elected
1989	Presidential election	PT	President	Popular Brazil Front (PT, PSB, PCdoB)	José Paulo Bisol	PSB	11,622,321	17.49%	Runoff
1989	Presidential election	PT	President	Popular Brazil Front (PT, PSB, PCdoB)	José Paulo Bisol	PSB	31,075,803	46.97%	Not elected
1994	Presidential election	PT	President	Brazilian Popular Front for Citizenship (PT, PSB, PPS, PV, PCdoB, PCB, PSTU)	Aloizio Mercadante	PT	17,122,127	27.04%	Not elected
1998	Presidential election	PT	President	Union of the People Change Brazil (PT, PDT, PSB, PCdoB, PCB)	Leonel Brizola	PDT	21,475,211	31.71%	Not elected
2002	Presidential election	PT	President	Lula President (PT, PL, PCdoB, PMN, PCB)	José Alencar	PL	39,455,233	46.44%	Runoff
2002	Presidential election	PT	President	Lula President (PT, PL, PCdoB, PMN, PCB)	José Alencar	PL	52,793,364	61.27%	Elected
2006	Presidential election	PT	President	The Strength of the People (PT, PRB, PCdoB)	José Alencar	Republicanos	46,662,365	48.60%	Runoff
2006	Presidential election	PT	President	The Strength of the People (PT, PRB, PCdoB)	José Alencar	Republicanos	58,295,042	60.83%	Elected
2022	Presidential election	PT	President	Brazil of Hope (PT, PCdoB, PV, PSOL, REDE, PSB, Solidariedade, Avante, Agir, PROS)	Geraldo Alckmin	PSB	57,259,504	48.43%	Runoff
2022	Presidential election	PT	President	Brazil of Hope (PT, PCdoB, PV, PSOL, REDE, PSB, Solidariedade, Avante, Agir, PROS)	Geraldo Alckmin	PSB	60,345,999	50.90%	Elected
2026	Presidential election	PT	President	Brazil Ready for More (PT, PCdoB, PV, PSOL, REDE, PSB, PDT)	Geraldo Alckmin	PSB	53,876,617	45.16%	Runoff
2026	Presidential election	PT	President	Brazil Ready for More (PT, PCdoB, PV, PSOL, REDE, PSB, PDT)	Geraldo Alckmin	PSB	64,256,232	51.79%	Elected

== First presidency (2003–2011) ==
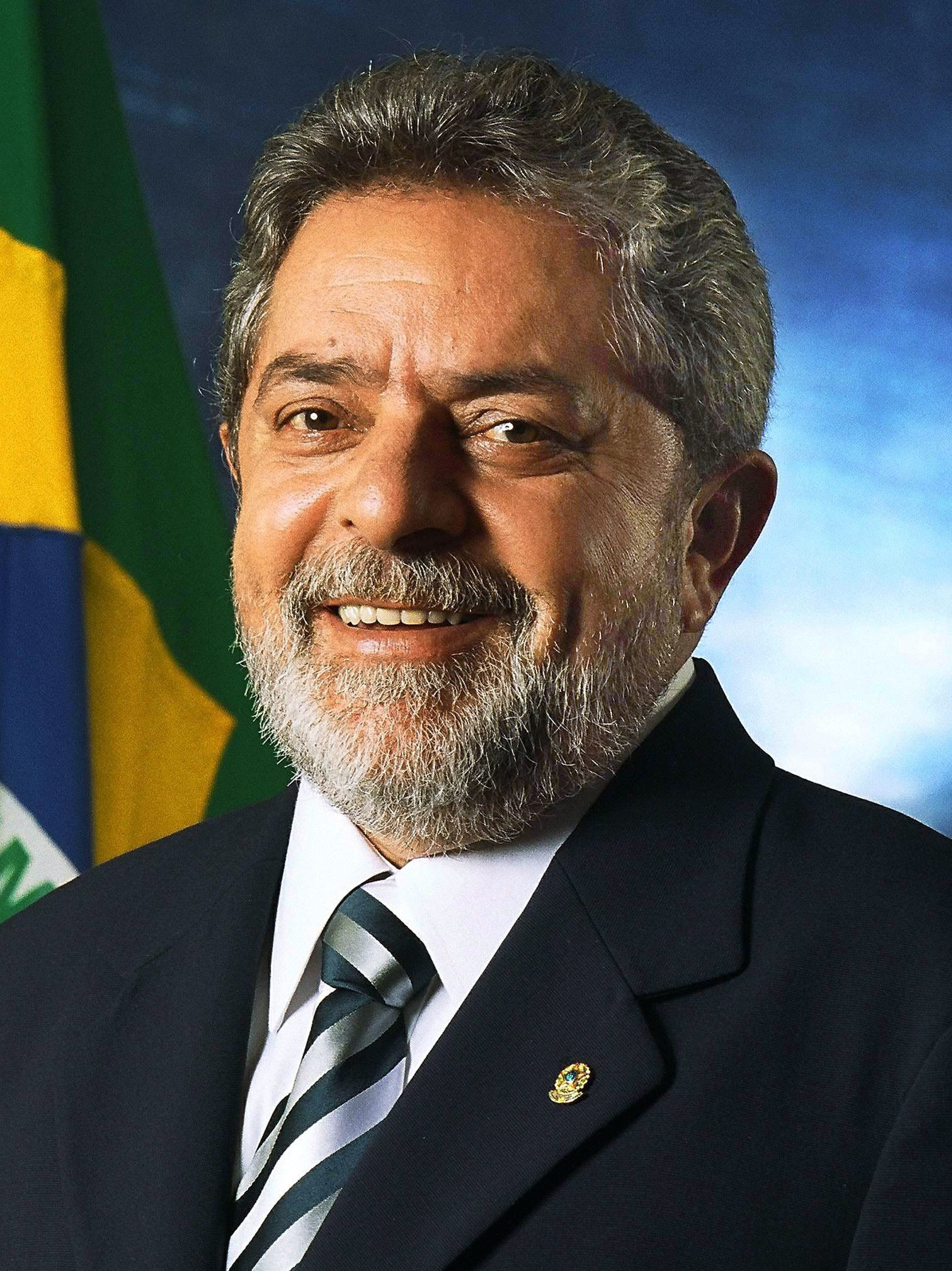
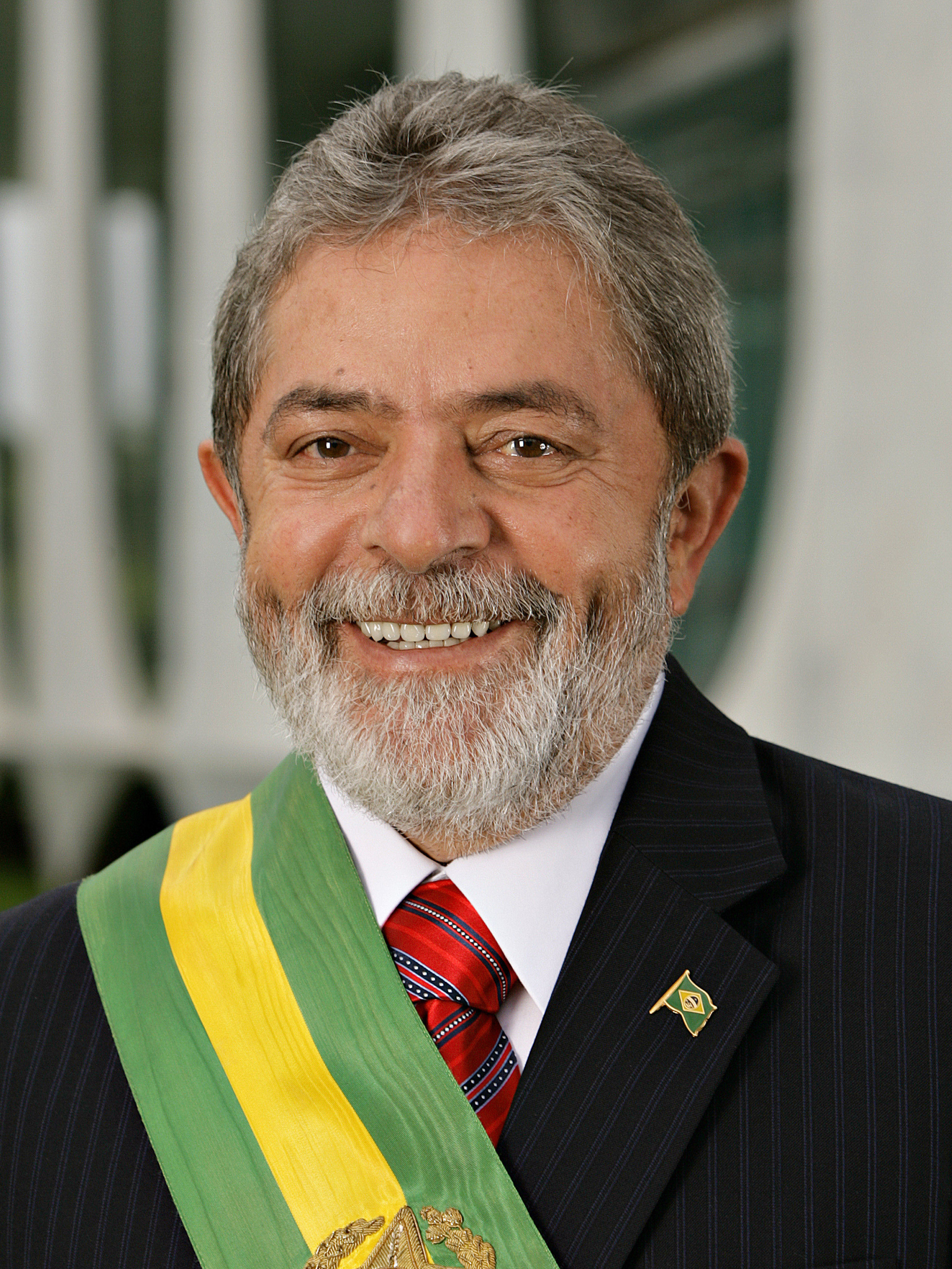
Lula at the beginning of his first (left) and second (right) terms

Lula, described as left-wing, served two terms as president from 2003 through 2010. During his farewell speech, he said he felt a burden to prove that he could handle the presidency despite his humble beginnings. "If I failed, it would be the workers' class which would be failing; it would be this country's poor who would be proving they did not have what it takes to rule".

=== Political orientation ===
Very few of the reforms that Lula proposed were actually implemented during Lula's terms of office. Some wings of the Worker's Party disagreed with the increasing moderation in focus since the late eighties, and left the party to form other parties, such as during Lula's presidency, the Socialism and Liberty Party. Alliances with old, traditional oligarch politicians, like former presidents José Sarney and Fernando Collor, have been a cause of disappointment for some.

=== Education ===
A number of educational initiatives were launched during Lula's first presidency. A free school meals programme was extended to 37 million pupils while a programme was launched which aimed to provide "whole or partial remission of student fees for low-income students". In 2006, primary education was extended from 8 to 9 years. A Fund for the Maintenance and Development of Basic Education was set up to improve the quality of education. The PED (an education development plan) conditioned the disbursement of public funds to state schools on the schools' performance.

Still in 2006, many Brazilians and commentators felt that Lula had not done enough to improve the quality of public education. And in 2010, while education was compulsory for all children in Brazil aged 7 to 14, in practice that requirement was only loosely enforced; 90% of children in rural areas attended school for less than four years, and only 25% of children living in favelas attended school.

=== Social programs ===
Lula's top social programme sought to eradicate hunger. It was financed by an increase in tax revenues, coupled with a decrease in government expenditures on both wages and on benefits paid to public employees, as well as a decrease in government expenditures on infrastructure. The programme followed the lead of a project that had already been put into practice in 1995 by the Fernando Henrique Cardoso administration, which was named Bolsa Escola (School Stipend). It expanded that initiative with the new Fome Zero ("Zero Hunger") programme, which was part of the Bolsa Família (Family Allowance) plan.

Five months after Lula took office, however, the budget for Fome Zero was cut down a third from its original amount, and one year later, about $800 million was budgeted toward the programme, but only $130 million of that was actually disbursed. Lula's programme was accused of having become more bark than bite, inasmuch as of May 2005, two years after the effort began, the programme had fallen far short of expectations.

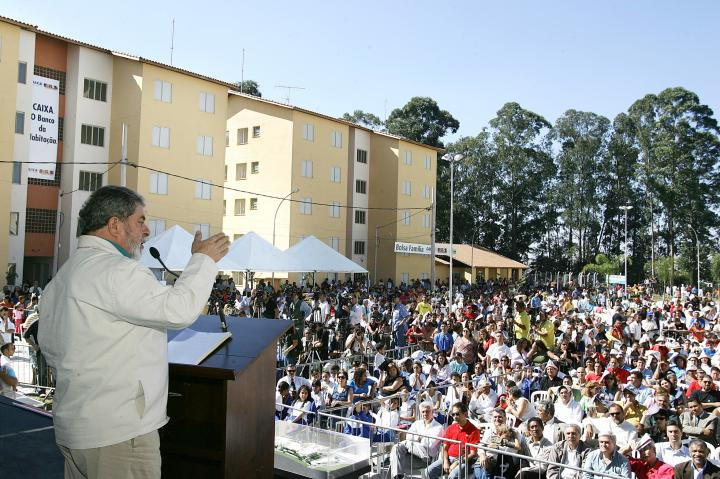
A Lula speech in Diadema launching subsidized housing and Bolsa Família credits, 2005

During Lula's first term, child malnutrition in Brazil decreased by 46%. In May 2010, the UN World Food Programme (WFP) awarded Lula the title of "World Champion in the Fight against Hunger". A number of other social projects were introduced during Lula's first presidency.

Lula launched a housing aid programme that was larger in scope to the policies developed until then. More than 15 billion euros were invested in water purification and the urbanization of favelas, and more than 40 billion in housing. The government proposed to relocate the poor populations that occupied the "risk zones", prone to floods or landslides; at the end of the day, however, at least 212 people died and at least 15,000 people were made homeless by the April 2010 Rio de Janeiro floods and mudslides alone. It proposed to then extend the electricity network, to relocate the streets and to improve the precarious housing. The government undertook to democratize access to real estate credit.

=== Economy ===
Lula's first two terms coincided with a strong boom in commodities prices. This fueled an economic boom in Brazil, which in turn allowed Lula to spend heavily on social programmes and pay off a $15 billion IMF loan a year early.

In the run-up to the 2002 elections, the fear of Lula taking drastic measures, and comparisons of him with Hugo Chávez of Venezuela, increased internal market speculation. This led to a drop in the value of the Brazilian real, and a downgrade of Brazil's credit rating. Lula chose Henrique Meirelles of the Brazilian Social Democracy Party (PSDB), a market-oriented economist, as head of the Brazilian Central Bank. As a former CEO of BankBoston he was well known to the market.

Lula and his cabinet followed, to an extent, the lead of the previous government in economics. It renewed all agreements with the International Monetary Fund (IMF), which were signed by the time Argentina defaulted on its own deals in 2001. His government achieved a satisfactory primary budget surplus in the first two years, as required by the IMF agreement, exceeding the target for the third year. In late 2005, the government paid off its debt to the IMF in full, two years ahead of schedule. The Brazilian economy was generally not affected by the 2005 Mensalão scandal, which related to vote buying in the Brazilian Congress.

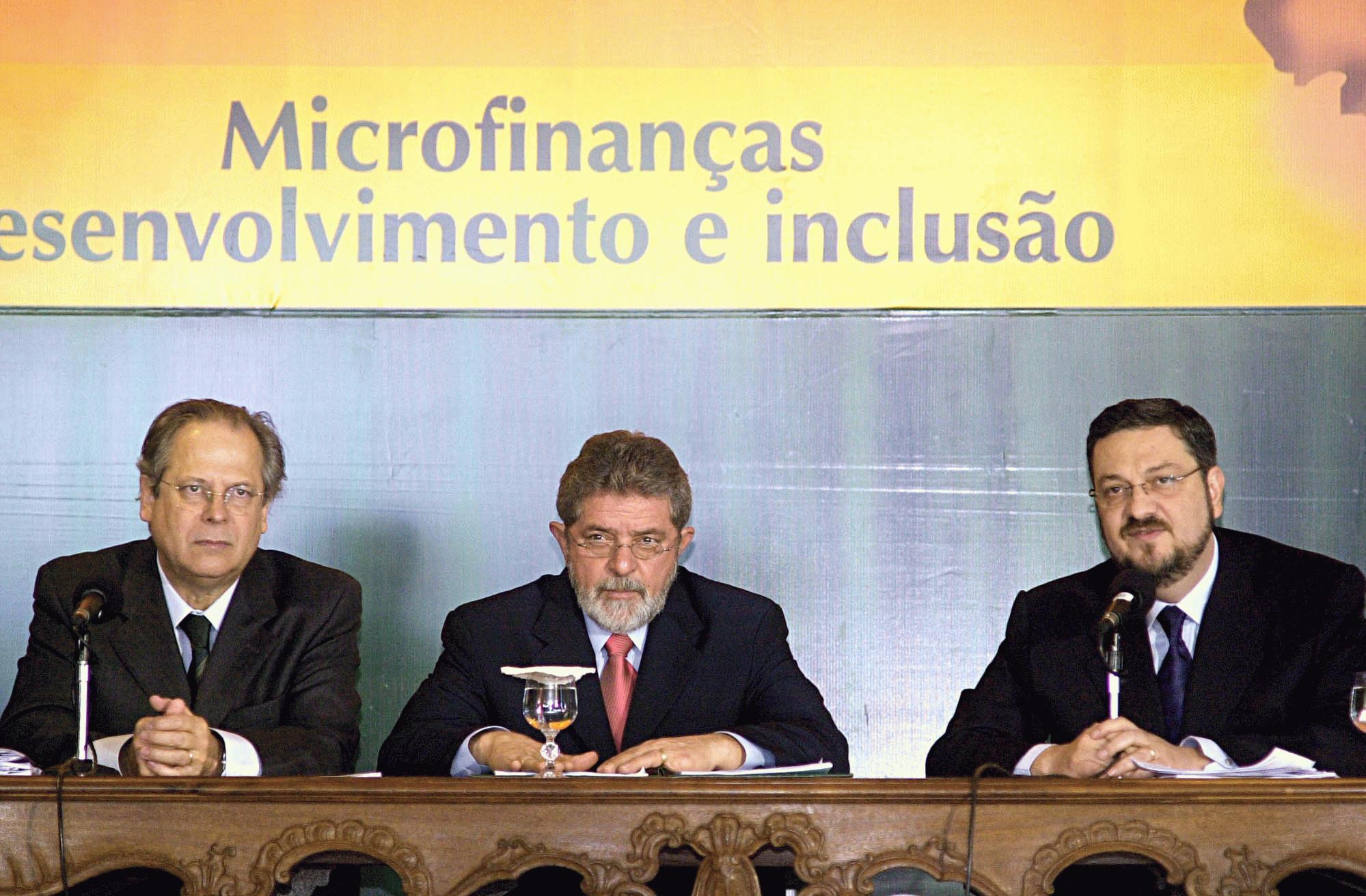
Chief of staff José Dirceu, Lula, and finance minister Antonio Palocci, 2003

In June 2005, economist and attorney José Dirceu, Lula's chief-of-staff since 2003, resigned after he was caught up in a massive corruption scheme in the legislature, the Mensalão corruption scandal. In March 2006, Lula's finance minister Antonio Palocci, who had continued the anti-inflation and pro-market policies of the previous centrist government, resigned due to his involvement in a corruption and abuse of power scandal. Lula then appointed Guido Mantega, a PT economist, as finance minister.

Not long after the start of his second term, in 2007 Lula's government announced the Growth Acceleration Programme (Programa de Aceleração de Crescimento, PAC), an investment programme which sought to solve many of the problems that prevented the Brazilian economy from expanding more rapidly. The measures included investment in the creation and repair of roads and railways, simplification and reduction of taxation, and modernization of the country's energy production to avoid further shortages. The money pledged to be spent on this programme was to be around R$ 500 billion (US $260 billion) over four years. However, by 2010 many projects remained mired in bureaucracy, and only 11% of the projects outlined in the plan had been completed, while just over half had not even been launched.

Prior to taking office, Lula had been a critic of privatization. His administration created public-private partnership concessions for seven federal roadways. After decades with the largest foreign debt among emerging economies, Brazil became a net creditor for the first time in January 2008. By mid-2008, both Fitch Ratings and Standard & Poor's had elevated the classification of Brazilian debt from speculative to investment grade. Banks made record profits under Lula's government.

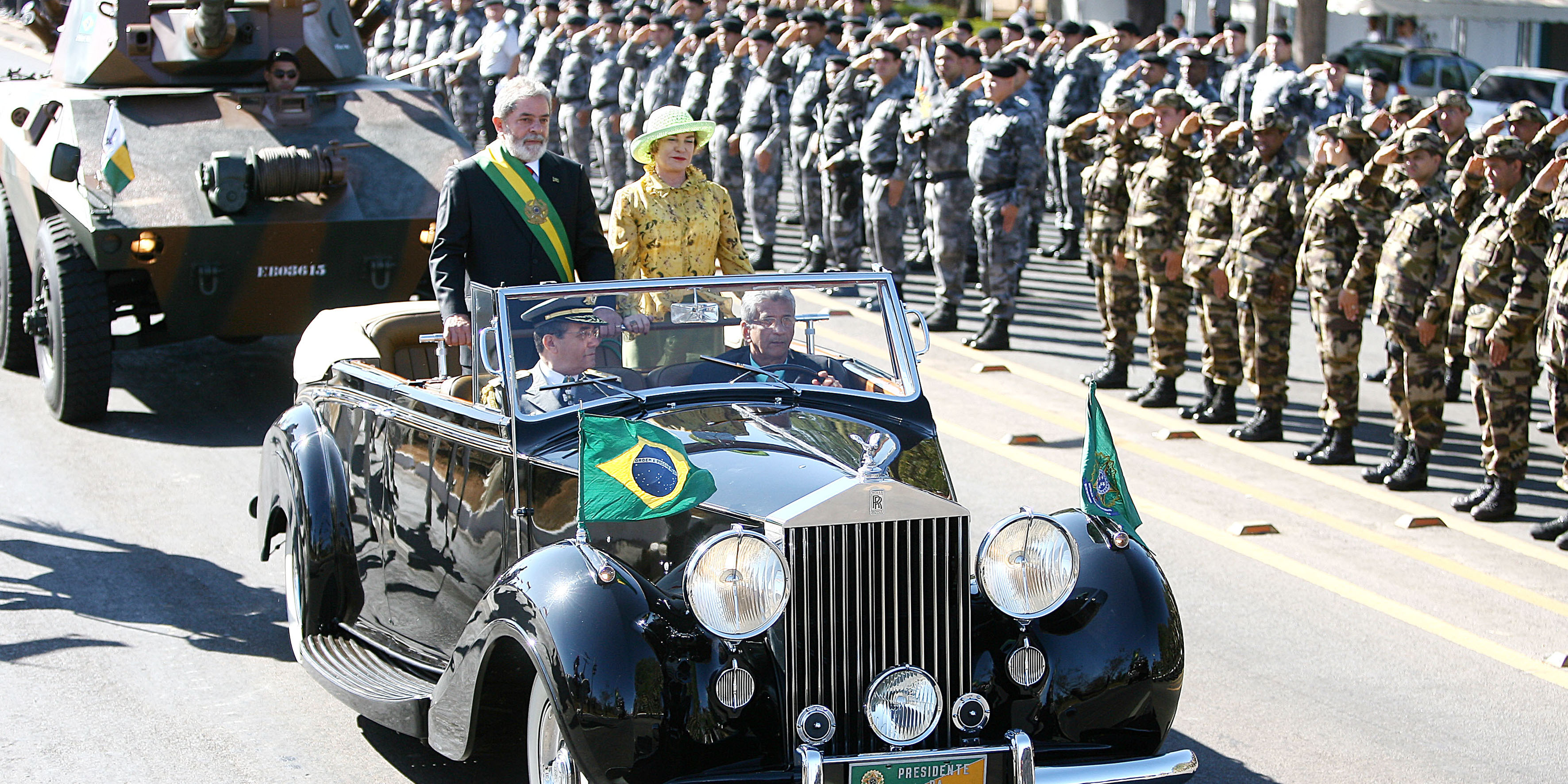
Lula and his wife Marisa Letícia review troops during the 2007 Independence Day military parade

The 2008 financial crisis might have been a tsunami in the US and Europe, Lula declared, but in Brazil it would be no more than a little 'ripple' ("uma marolinha"). The phrase was seized on by the Brazilian press as proof of Lula's reckless economic ignorance and irresponsibility. In 2008, Brazil enjoyed economic good health to mitigate the 2008 financial crisis with a large economic stimulus lasting, at least, until 2014. According to The Washington Post: "Under Lula, Brazil became the world's eighth-largest economy, [and] more than 20 million people rose out of acute poverty ..."

At the same time, in 2010 The Wall Street Journal noted that: "[Brazil's] public sector is bloated and riddled with corruption. Crime is rampant. Its infrastructure is badly in need of repair and expansion. The business environment is restrictive, with a labour code ripped from the pages of Benito Mussolini's economic playbook. Brazil also risks patting itself on the back so much that it fails to see the colossal work that remains to be done."

=== Environment ===
Brazil's deforestation rate declined during Lula's time in office, and reversed under Bolsonaro.

Initially, Lula's administration pushed for progressive policies that significantly curbed deforestation in the Amazon. Despite this, he did not support legislation that would have required the country to phase out its fossil fuels.

In May 2008, environmental minister Marina Silva resigned, blamed "stagnation" in the government, after she lost disagreements with Lula when she opposed approval of new hydroelectric dams in the Amazon and criticized Lula's biofuels programme. Dr. Daniel Nepstad of the Woods Hole Research Centre said the growing demand for biofuels may ultimately result in more Amazon deforestation. In particular, environmentalists warn that while biofuels reduce emissions of greenhouse gases, they may well also trigger a significant expansion of the biofuel crops; that, in turn, may push agriculture deeper into forests, destroying habitat and biodiversity.

The creation of conservation areas and indigenous reserves led to a decrease of around 75% in deforestation starting in 2004. In Lula's first year in office, in 2003–04, 25,000 square kilometers of Brazilian forest were destroyed, the second-worst devastation since 1977. In late 2006, the Instituto Soicioambiental environmental group said that deforestation in Lula's first four years had been worse than in any four-year period since 1988.

By 2009, Brazil's Amazon destruction—though lower—was still about 7,000 square kilometers a year, larger than the US state of Delaware. Critics said that Brazil's lowest rate of deforestation in 2009 was a function of the 2008 financial crisis. Paulo Adario of Greenpeace said that it was a function not of efforts to protect the climate, but of the fact that the "demand for beef, soya and wood ha[d] dramatically fallen".

In 2009, Lula gave a speech in which he said that "gringos" should pay Amazon nations to prevent deforestation.

In February 2010, Lula's government approved the construction of a controversial hydroelectric mega Belo Monte Dam in the middle of the Amazon rain forest in the Brazilian state of Pará. It was to be the third-largest hydroelectric dam in the world. Environmental activists protested the building of the dam. It was expected to cause a significant decline in the water table, resulting in significant losses of aquatic and terrestrial fauna, and adversely impact aquatic mammals. Approximately 20,000-40,000 indigenous people were to be resettled with little or no compensation, and 516 square kilometers (199 square miles) of rain forest were to be flooded for the dam's construction.

=== Foreign policy ===
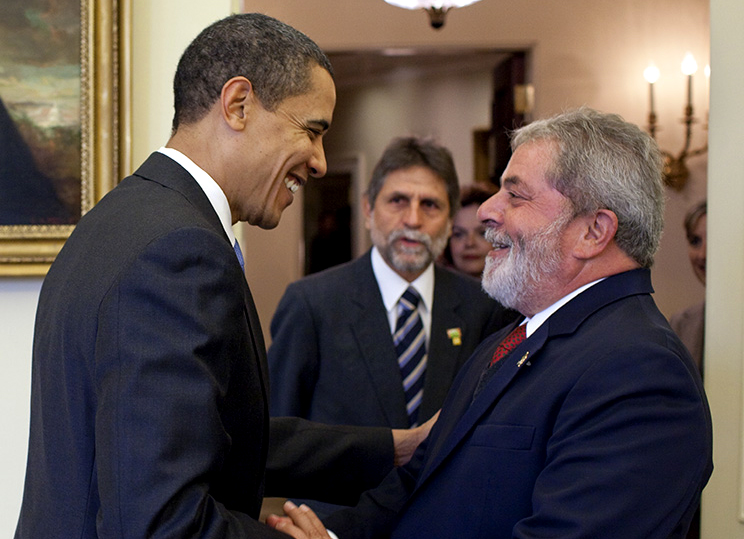
U.S. President Barack Obama greets Lula in the Oval Office, 2009

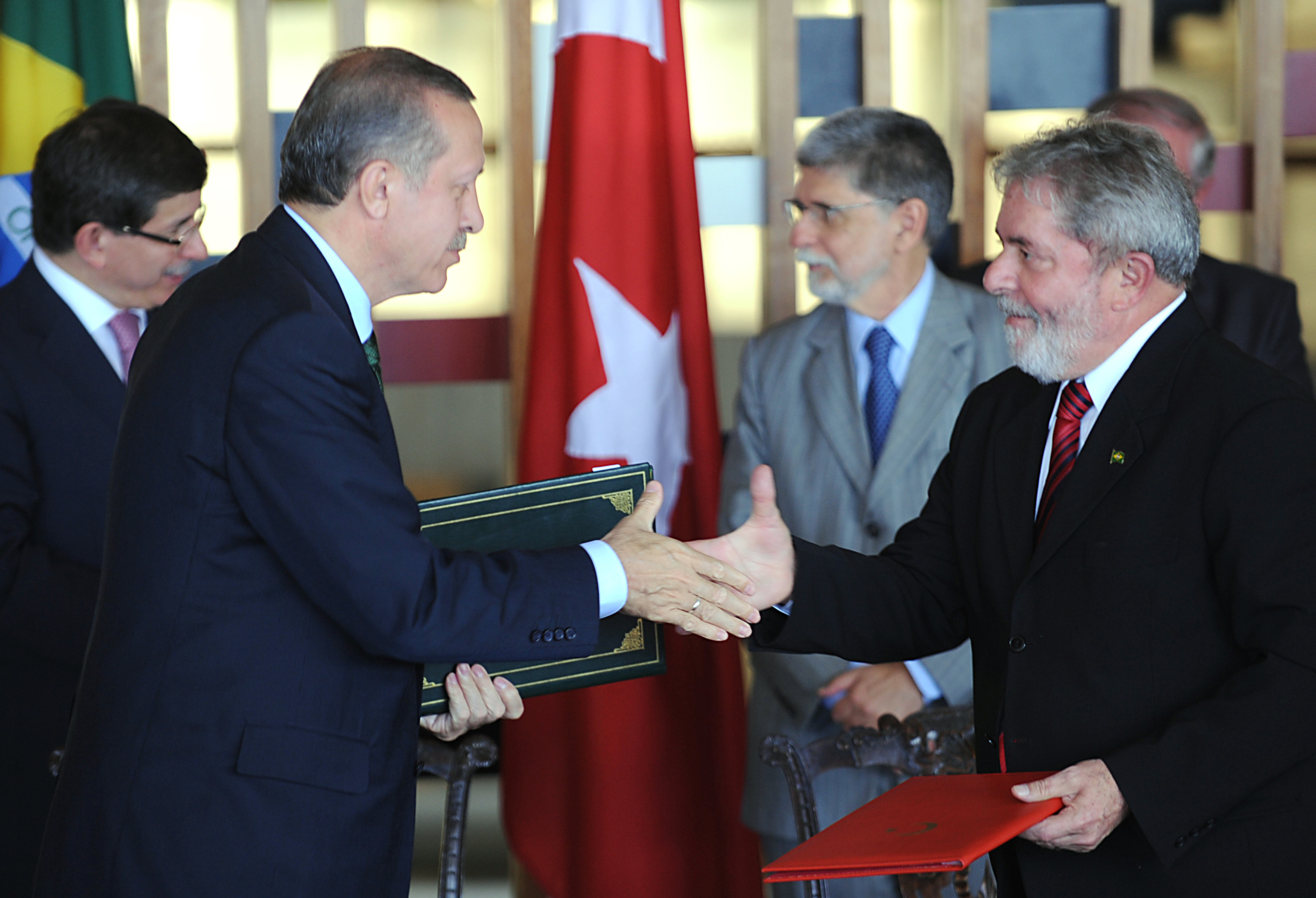
Lula with Turkish Prime Minister Recep Tayyip Erdoğan negotiated a failed 2010 Iran nuclear fuel swap deal

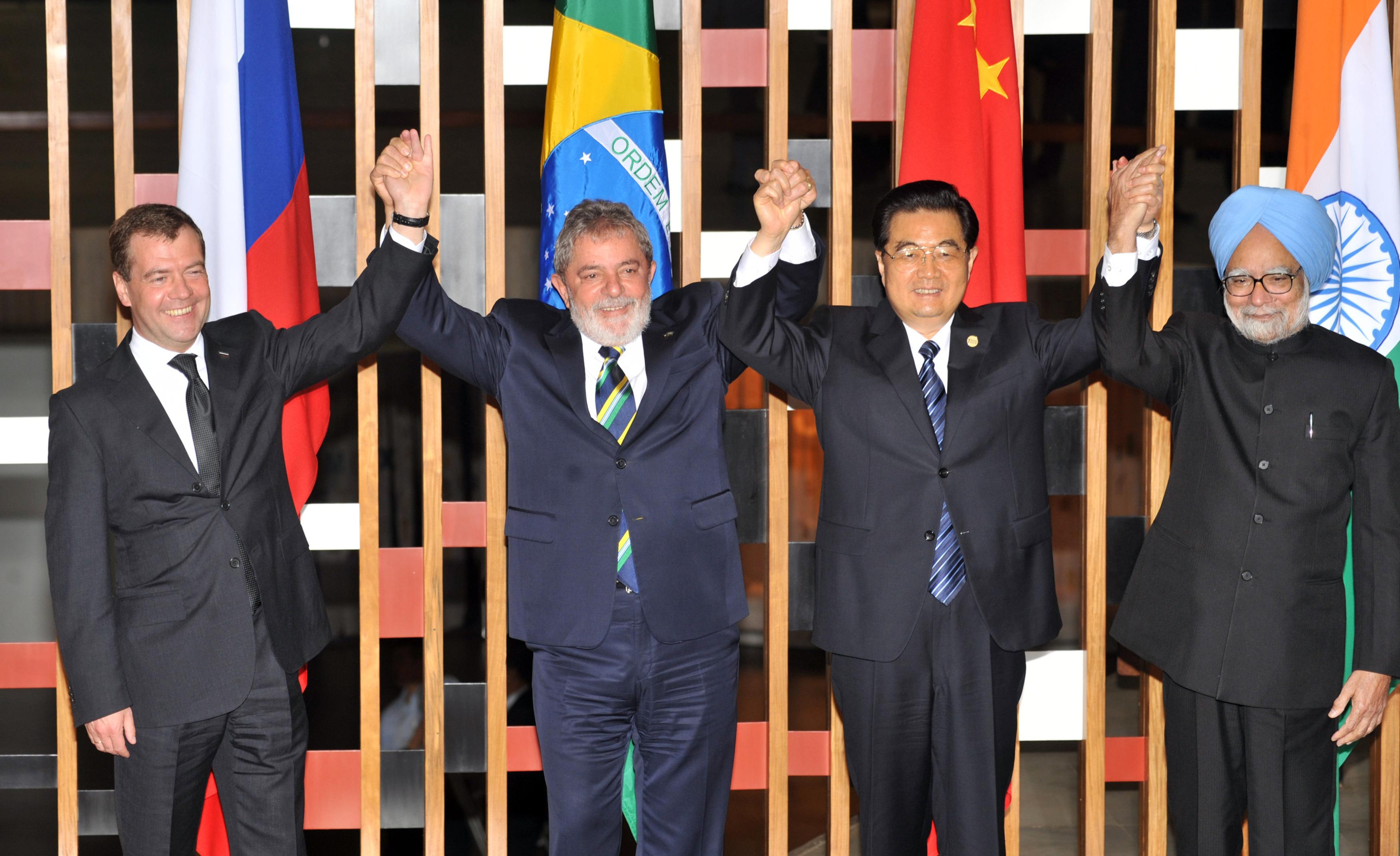
Lula with leaders from Russia, China, and India at the 2nd BRIC summit

In 1979, Lula was asked in an interview which historical figures he admired most. He answered: Gandhi, Che Guevara, and Mao Zedong. Upon being asked to give additional examples, he added Fidel Castro, Ruhollah Khomeini and Adolf Hitler and saying about the latter: "I admire in a man the fire to want to do something, and then his going out to try to do it."

Leading a large agricultural state, Lula generally opposed and criticized farm subsidies, and this position has been seen as one of the reasons for the walkout of developing nations and subsequent collapse of the Cancún World Trade Organization talks in 2003 over G8 agricultural subsidies. Brazil played a role in negotiations regarding internal conflicts in Venezuela and Colombia, and made efforts to strengthen Mercosur. During the Lula administration, Brazilian foreign trade increased dramatically, changing from deficits to several surpluses after 2003. In 2004, the surplus was US$29 billion, due to a substantial increase in global demand for commodities. Brazil also provided UN peacekeeping troops and led a peacekeeping mission in Haiti.

According to The Economist of 2 March 2006, Lula had a pragmatic foreign policy, seeing himself as a negotiator, not an ideologue, a leader adept at reconciling opposites. As a result, he befriended both Venezuelan president Hugo Chávez and U.S. President George W. Bush. Former Finance Minister, and current advisor, Delfim Netto, said: "Lula is the ultimate pragmatist".

He travelled to more than 80 countries during his presidency. A goal of Lula's foreign policy was for the country to gain a seat as a permanent member of the United Nations Security Council. In this he was unsuccessful.

==== China ====
From 2003 to 2010, Lula embraced China as central to reforming what he considered an unjust global order. He intertwined the Chinese and Brazilian economies. Lula stated Brazil's commitment to the One China principle that is the position held by the People's Republic of China and the ruling Chinese Communist Party, saying that the government of the People's Republic of China was the sole legal government representing the whole of China, including Taiwan—as part of China.

==== Cuba ====
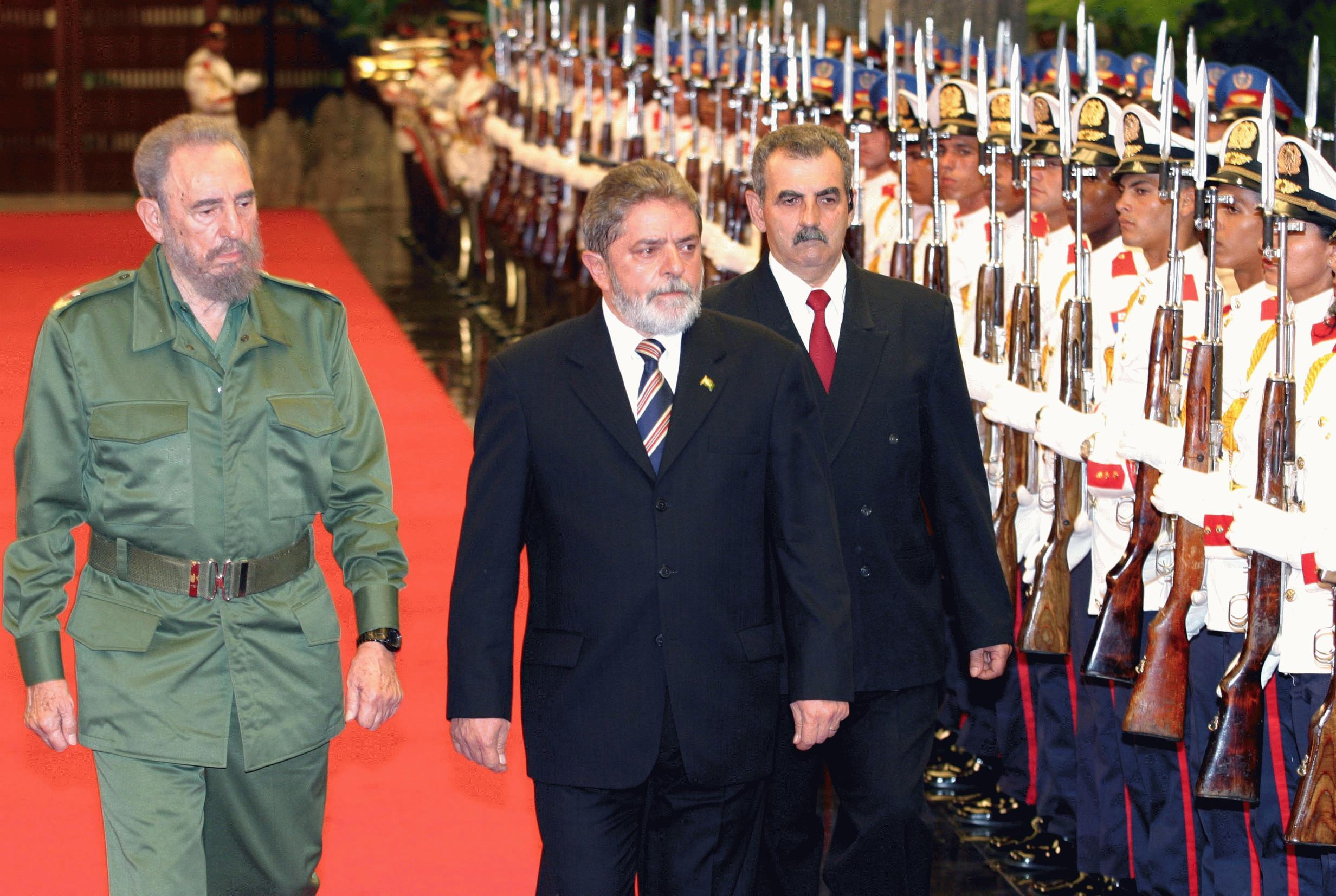
Lula and Cuban leader Fidel Castro, 2003

Lula and Cuban president Fidel Castro were longtime friends. Under Lula, Brazil provided money and corporate support to Cuba. The state-controlled Brazilian oil company Petrobras studied the possibility of drilling for oil off of Cuba, while the Odebrecht construction firm headed a revamp of the Cuban port of Mariel into the island's main commercial port. Brazil's state-run Brazilian Development Bank gave $300 million to Odebrecht to build new roads, rail lines, wharves, and warehouses at Mariel. Brazil also offered Cuba up to $1 billion in credit lines to pay for Brazilian goods and services.

==== Iran ====
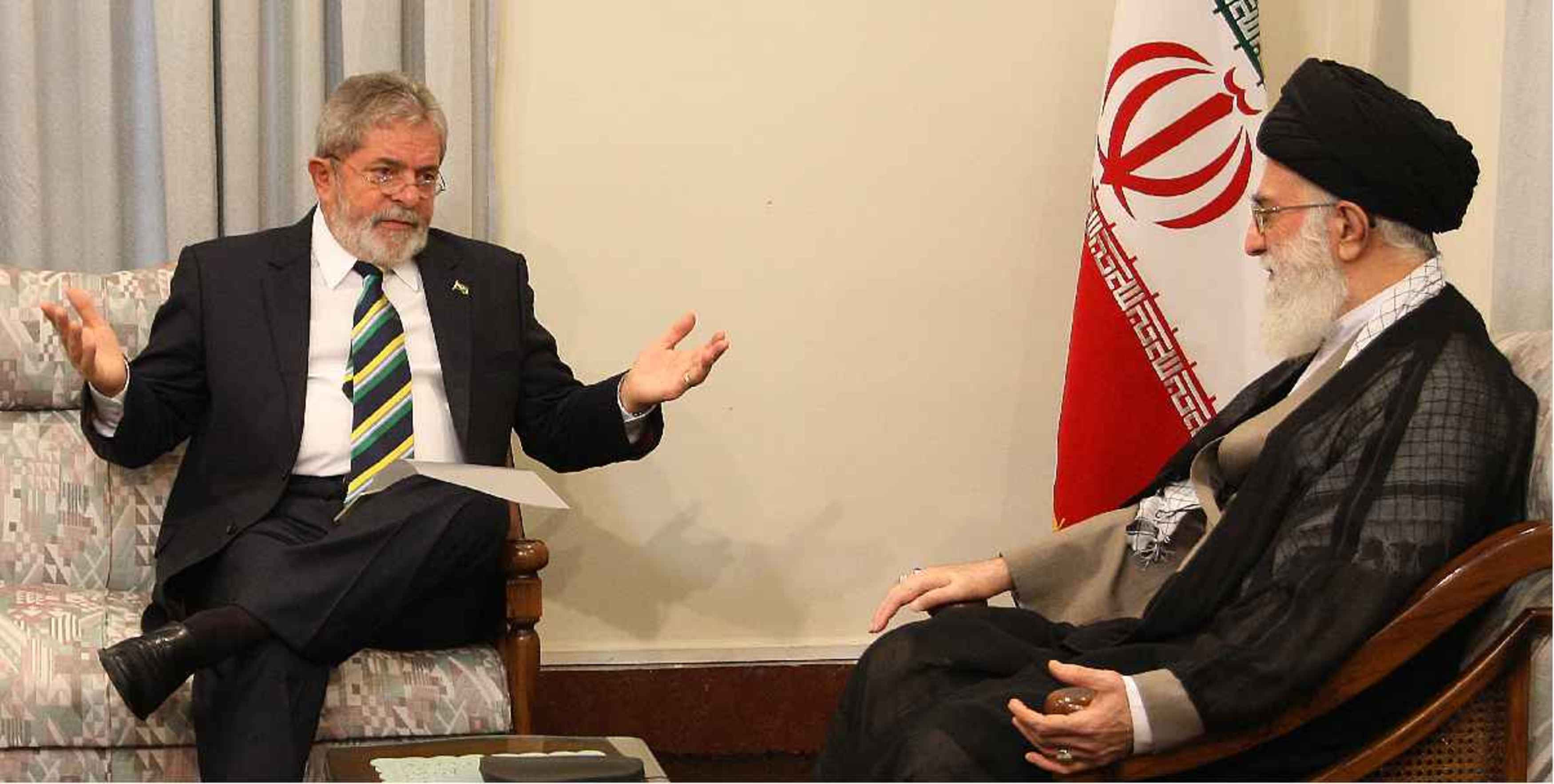
Lula with Supreme Leader of Iran Ali Khamenei, 2010

The conviction by an Iranian court of Iranian Sakineh Mohammadi Ashtiani for the crime of adultery, with a sentence in 2006 of execution by stoning, led to calls for Lula to intercede on her behalf. In July 2010, Lula said "I need to respect the laws of a [foreign] country. If my friendship with the president of Iran and the respect that I have for him is worth something, if this woman has become a nuisance, we will receive her in Brazil". The Iranian government declined his offer.

Mina Ahadi, an Iranian Communist politician, welcomed Lula's offer, but reiterated a call for an end to stoning altogether and requested a cessation of recognition and support for the Iranian government. Jackson Diehl, deputy editorial page editor of The Washington Post, called Lula the "best friend of tyrants in the democratic world," and criticised his actions. Shirin Ebadi, Iranian human rights activist and Nobel Peace Prize laureate called Lula's comments a "powerful message to the Islamic Republic".

In 2009, Lula warmly hosted Iranian president Ahmadinejad, who made a controversial visit to Brazil. Some demonstrators expressed displeasure over Ahmadinejad's positions on human rights and his denial of the Holocaust.

In May 2010, Lula and Turkey's prime minister Recep Tayyip Erdoğan negotiated a preliminary fuel swap agreement with the Iranian government on uranium enrichment, that ultimately failed. The preliminary agreement that they presented to the United Nations was at odds with what the International Atomic Energy Agency and other countries viewed as necessary actions to stop Iran from obtaining weapons grade materials. Within hours of signing the agreement, Iran did an about-face and announced that it would continue to enrich some uranium. U.S. Secretary of State Hillary Clinton said Brazil was being "used" by Tehran.

The UN Security Council ultimately rejected it when permanent member country representatives argued that "the swap proposal negotiated by Brazil and Turkey would leave Iran with enough material to make a nuclear weapon," and that "Iran intends to continue a new programme of enriching uranium to a higher level." Pulitzer Prize winning journalist Thomas Friedman wrote: "Is there anything uglier than watching democrats sell out other democrats to a Holocaust-denying, vote-stealing Iranian thug just to tweak the U.S. and show that they, too, can play at the big power table?"

Moisés Naím, editor in chief of Foreign Policy magazine and former Minister of Trade in Venezuela, said "Lula is a political giant, but morally he has been a deep disappointment." In 2010, in addition, Brazilians largely disagreed with Lula as to how to handle Iran and Iran's nuclear weapons programme. While Lula opposed additional international economic sanctions against Iran, of the 85% of Brazilians who opposed Iran acquiring nuclear weapons, two-thirds approved of tighter international sanctions on Iran to try to prevent it from developing nuclear weapons.

==== Iraq ====
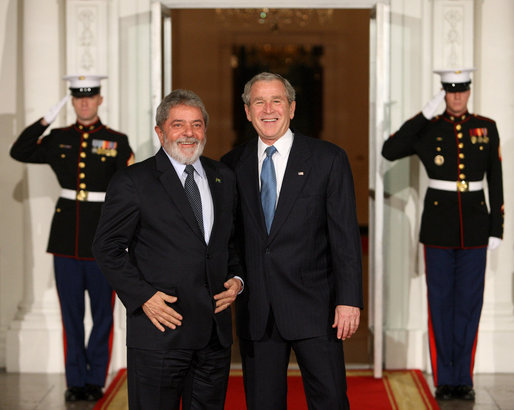
Lula with U.S. President George W. Bush in November 2008

In 2003, Lula condemned the U.S.-led invasion of Iraq, saying that the United States had no right "to decide unilaterally what is good and what is bad for the world". He said that "the behaviour of the United States in relation to Iraq has weakened the United Nations".

==== Libya ====
Brazil, as a non-permanent member of the UN Security Council, abstained from the vote authorising "all necessary measures" against Libya's Muammar Gaddafi. It opposed the bombing in Libya to implement United Nations Security Council Resolution 1973. Lula said: "These invasions only happen because the United Nations is weak."

==== Venezuela ====
Lula was close with Venezuela's president Hugo Chávez, a close ally of Communist Cuba and an antagonist of the United States. In November 2007, Lula defended Chávez as the democratic choice of his people. He said: "There is no risk with Chávez." Expressing his admiration for Chávez, he said "Only thanks to Chávez's leadership, the people [of Venezuela] have had extraordinary achievements," and that in 2008 that Chávez was "the best president the country has had in 100 years." However, in 2010 Brazilians largely had a different view than Lula, as only 13% had at least some confidence in Chávez, while 70% had little or no confidence in him.

=== Freedom of the press ===
After Lula was infuriated by a 9 May 2004, New York Times article that claimed he had a drinking problem, Brazil ordered the New York Times reporter, Larry Rohter, to leave the country and revoked his visa because he had written a story "offensive to the honour of the president." Lula said: "Certainly its author ... must be more worried than I am ... it deserves action." Brazil's presidential palace threatened to take legal action against the New York Times, which stood by the story and said that the expulsion raised serious questions about freedom of expression and freedom of the press in Brazil.

No journalist had been expelled from Brazil since its military dictatorship ended in the mid-1980s. Brazilian opposition senator Tasso Jereissati said: "This is ridiculous. It's more like the immature act of a dictator of a third-rate republic..." Brazil's second largest union, Força Sindical, issued a statement expressing concern that: "it is a reaction typical of authoritarian governments that don't like contrary voices." Despite criticism, on 13 May 2004, Lula said "he would not consider revoking the action." The government subsequently changed its position, and allowed the reporter to remain.

Three months later, Lula introduced legislation to create a Brazil National Journalists' Council that would have the power to "orient, discipline and monitor" journalists and their work. Critics called the draft law the worst affront to press freedom since censorship under the military dictatorship. The government also proposed the establishment of a National Cinema and Audiovisual Agency that would have the power to conduct prior reviews of programming and to veto certain programmes if they believed that they did not to meet standards of "editorial responsibility."

== Corruption scandals and legal challenges ==
Lula's administration was plagued by numerous corruption scandals, notably the Mensalão $50 million vote-buying scandal and Escândalo dos sanguessugas during Lula's first term.

=== Mensalão vote-buying scandal ===
In the 2005 Mensalão $50 million vote-buying scandal, Brazilian attorney general Álvaro Augusto Ribeiro Costa presented charges against 40 politicians and officials involved in the Mensalão affair, including several charges against Lula himself. Lula said that he knew nothing about the scandals.

Among those convicted were Jose Dirceu (who was Lula's chief of staff and right-hand man from 2003 to 2005; he was sentenced to over 10 years in jail), and both the former head of Lula's Workers Party, Jose Genoino, and its treasurer, Delubio Soares. Dirceu and officials Luiz Gushiken and Humberto Costa said that Lula was not involved. Roberto Jefferson said that if Lula didn't "commit a crime by action, he committed it by omission." But one of Lula's own party members, Arlindo Chinaglia, alleged that Lula had been warned about the matter, and businessman Marcos Valério, who was sentenced to more than 40 years in prison for his involvement in the scandal, alleged in testimony after he was convicted that Lula had authorized loans for the scheme and used some of the money to pay for his personal expenses.

=== Politicking ===
His administration was criticized for relying on local, right-of-centre political barons, like José Sarney, Jader Barbalho, Renan Calheiros and Fernando Collor to ensure a majority in Congress. Another frequent reproach was his ambiguous treatment of the left wing of the PT. Analysts felt that he would occasionally give in to left-wing calls for tighter government control on media and increased state intervention: in 2004, he pushed for the creation of a "Federal Council of Journalists" (CFJ) and a "National Cinema Agency" (Ancinav), the latter designed to overhaul funding for electronic communications. Both proposals ultimately failed amid concerns over the effect of state control on free speech.

=== Great Recession caused by white people with blue eyes ===
Before a G-20 summit in London in March 2009, Lula caused an uproar by declaring that the economic crisis was caused by "the irrational behavior of white people with blue eyes, who before seemed to know everything, and now have shown they don't know anything". He added: "I don't know any black or indigenous bankers." He repeated the accusation the following month.

=== Cesare Battisti ===
When Italian far-left militant Cesare Battisti of the Armed Proletarians for Communism, wanted for four murders, was arrested in Rio de Janeiro in March 2007 by Brazilian and French police officers, Brazilian Minister of Justice Tarso Genro granted him status as a political refugee. It was a controversial decision, which divided Italy and the Brazilian and international press. In February 2009, the European Parliament adopted a resolution in support of Italy, and held a minute's silence in memory of Battisti's victims. In November 2009, the Brazilian Supreme Court declared the grant of refugee status illegal and allowed Battisti's extradition, but also stated that the Brazilian constitution gave the president the personal power to deny the extradition if he chose to, effectively putting the final decision in the hands of Lula.

Lula barred Battisti's extradition. On 31 December 2010, Lula's last day in office, his decision not to allow Battisti's extradition was officially announced. Battisti was released on 9 June 2011 from prison, after the Brazilian Constitutional Court denied Italy's request to extradite him. Italy planned to appeal to the International Court of Justice in the Hague, saying Brazil had breached an extradition treaty. President Michel Temer revoked his status as a permanent resident in December 2018 and an arrest warrant was issued; Battisti then entered Bolivia illegally, and was arrested and extradited from Bolivia in January 2019.

=== Operation Zelotes ===
In 2015, Lula, along with his former chief of staff Gilberto Carvalho and five others, was indicted in a corruption probe as part of Operation Zelotes, regarding payment of R$6 million in bribes (US $1.5 million). Prosecutors alleged they helped pass Provisional Measure 471 (which was later converted into Law 12,218/2010) in 2009 in order to benefit the automotive companies Grupo Caoa and MMC. On 21 June 2021, Judge Frederico Botelho de Barros Viana of the 10th Federal Court of Brasilia acquitted all the accused, saying that the prosecution did not convincingly demonstrate that the defendants were involved in a criminal conspiracy.

=== Operation Car Wash: corruption investigation and prosecution ===
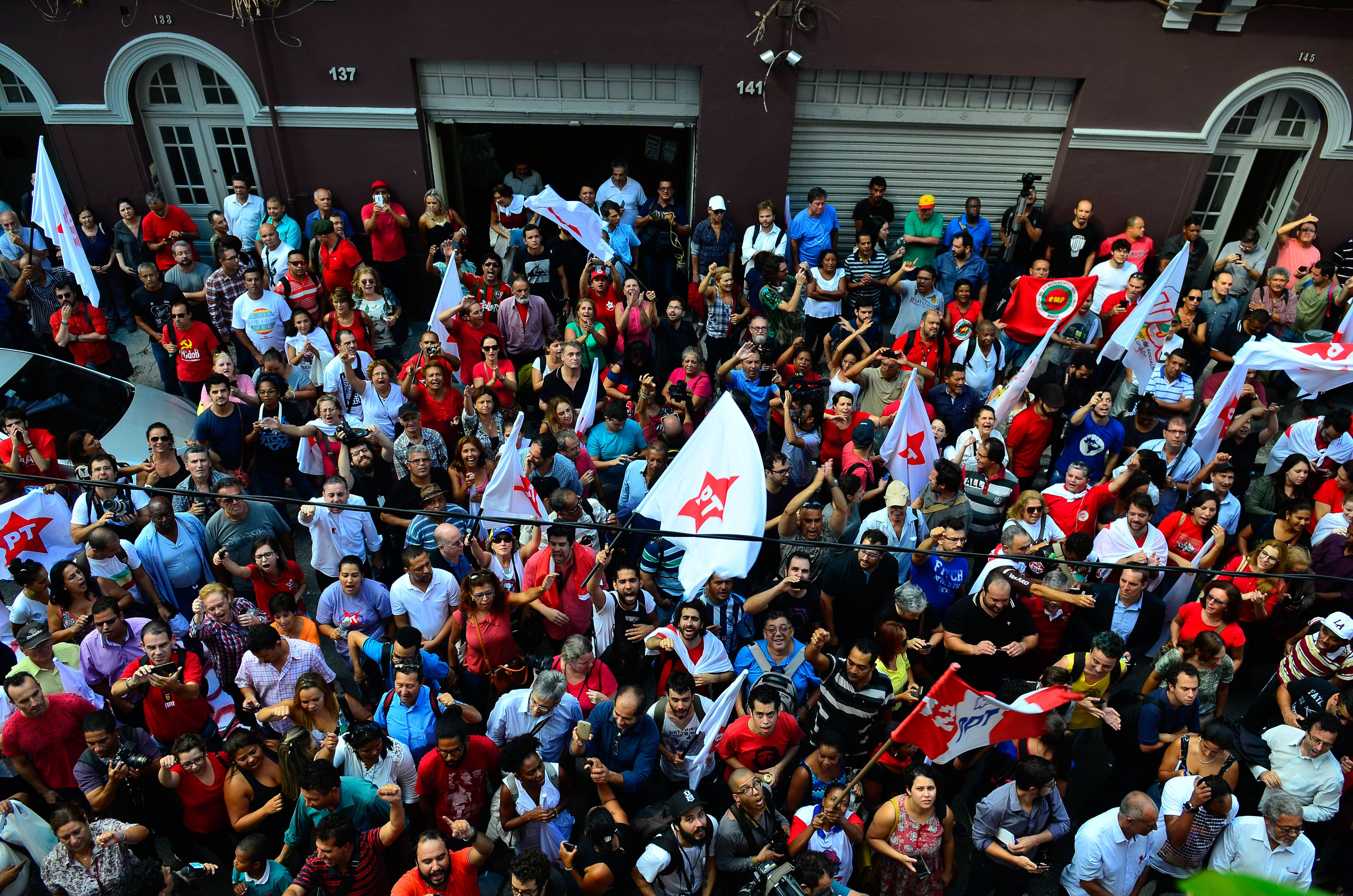
Protests related to Lula's 2016 testimony

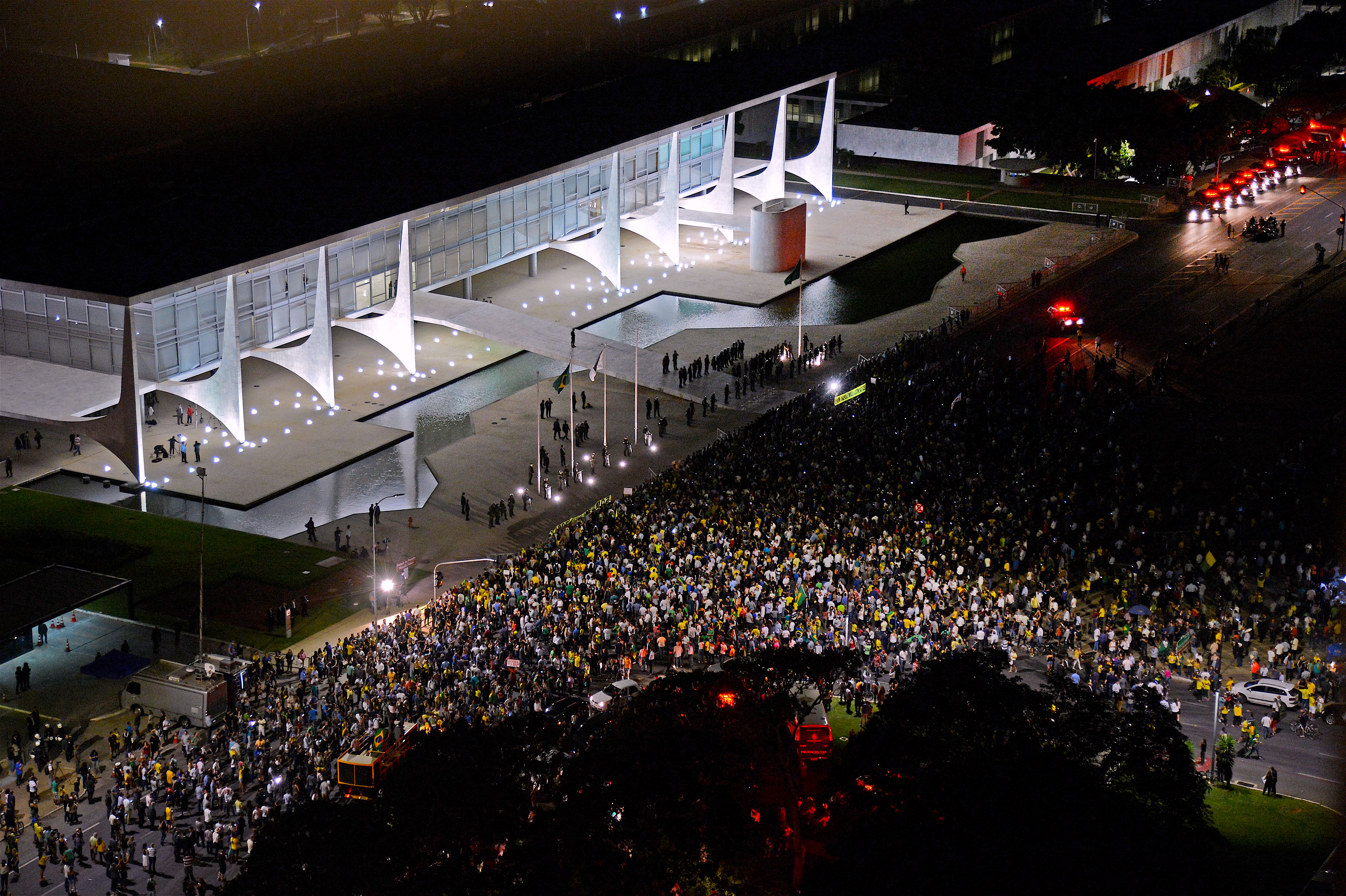
Demonstrators gather in front of the Palácio do Planalto, the presidential palace, to protest against Lula's appointment as Chief of Staff of the Presidency, 16 March 2016

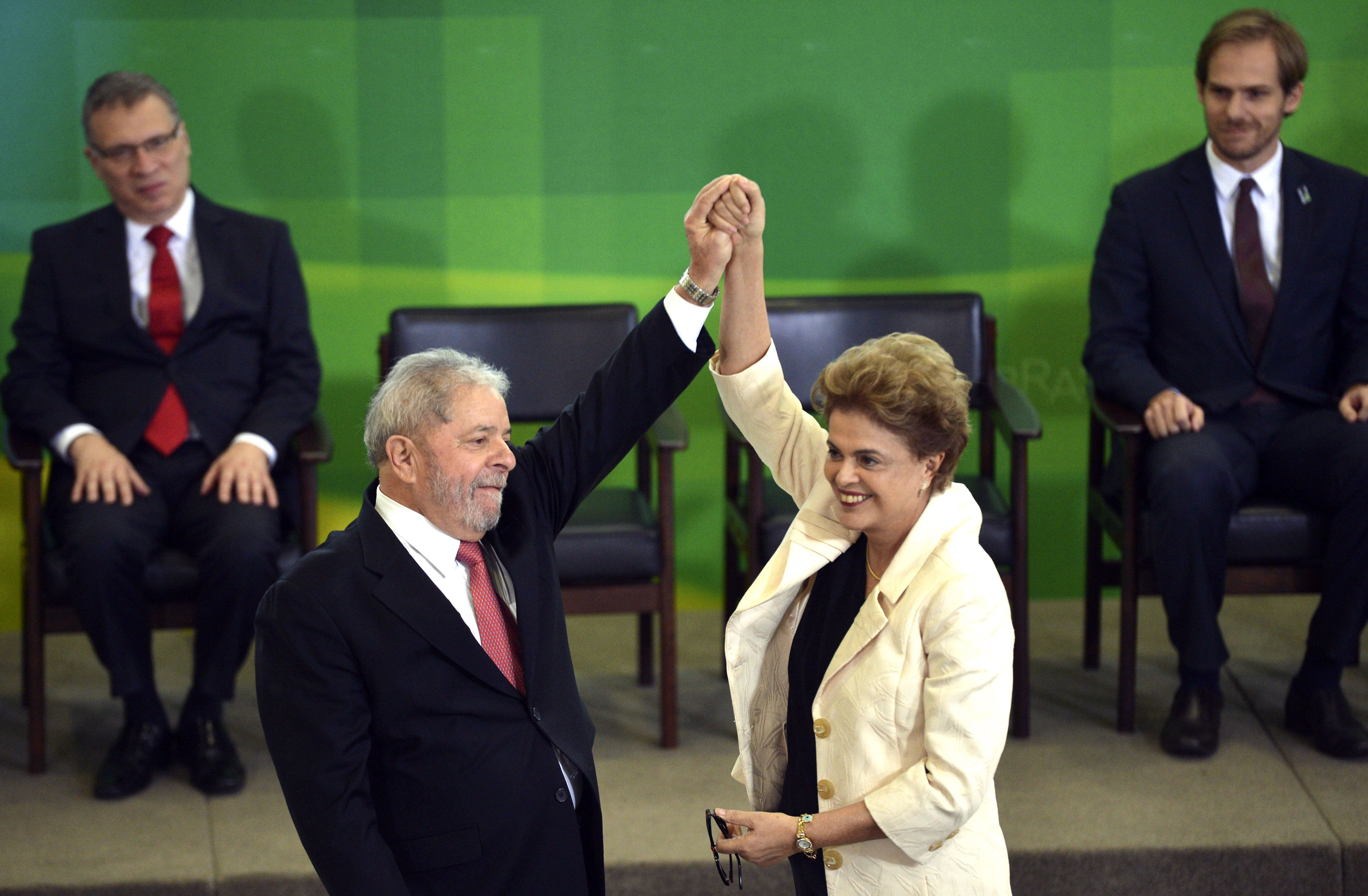
Lula is sworn in as Chief of Staff by President Dilma Rousseff on 17 March 2016.

In 2014, Brazil began Operação Lava Jato (English: Operation Car Wash), resulting in multiple arrests and convictions, including nine suits against Lula.

In April 2015, the Public Ministry of Brazil opened an investigation into allegations of influence peddling by Lula, which alleged that between 2011 and 2014 he had lobbied for government contracts in foreign countries for the Odebrecht company and had also persuaded the Brazilian Development Bank to finance the projects in Ghana, Angola, Cuba, and the Dominican Republic. In June 2015, Marcelo Odebrecht, president of Odebrecht, was arrested on charges that he had paid politicians $230 million in bribes. Three other company executives were also arrested, as well as the chief executive of Andrade Gutierrez, another construction conglomerate.

On 4 March 2016, as part of "Operation Car Wash", Brazilian authorities raided Lula's home. After the raid, the police detained Lula for questioning. A police statement alleged that Lula had collaborated in illegal bribes from the oil company Petrobras to benefit his political party and presidential campaign. Prosecutor Carlos Fernando said, "The favours to Lula from big construction companies involved in the fraud at Petrobras were many and hard to quantify". Lula said that he and his party were being politically persecuted.

On 16 March 2016, Rousseff appointed Lula as her chief of staff, a position comparable to that of prime minister. This would have shielded him from arrest due to the immunity that went with the position. Cabinet ministers in Brazil are among close to seven hundred senior government officials enjoying special judicial standing, which means they can only be tried by Brazil's Supreme Federal Court. Supreme Court Judge Gilmar Mendes suspended Lula's appointment on the grounds that Rousseff was trying to help Lula circumvent prosecution.

On 28 July 2016, Lula filed a petition with the United Nations Human Rights Committee, a panel of experts, requesting that it provide a view on his accusation that Moro had violated his rights. The Committee ultimately accepted the case. The Brazilian ambassador to the UK wrote: "The (Brazilian) judiciary is fully independent and due process of law is faithfully observed. All defendants facing criminal prosecution fully enjoy the guarantee of a fair trial and the right to appeal."

On 14 September 2016, prosecutors filed corruption charges against Lula, accusing him of being the mastermind or 'maximum commander of the scheme'. On 19 September 2016, 13th Circuit (Paraná) federal judge Sergio Moro, who was leading the corruption probe, accepted an indictment for money laundering against Lula and his wife Marisa Letícia Lula da Silva. On 11 May 2017, Lula answered a summons by appearing in Curitiba and was questioned by Moro. The closed-court hearing lasted five hours. Thousands of Lula supporters went to Curitiba, together with Dilma Rousseff. After the hearing, Lula and Rousseff gave speeches to his supporters; Lula attacked what he called bias in the Brazilian media.

==== Guilty verdict and sentencing ====
Lula was found guilty by the lower court of accepting R$3.7 million in bribes ($940,000 US) in the form of improvements to his beachfront house, made by construction company Grupo Metha, which in turn received lucrative contracts from the state-owned oil company Petrobras. Lula also faced other charges, including money laundering, influence peddling and obstruction of justice. On 12 July 2017, Sergio Moro sentenced Lula to nine and a half years in prison. Lula remained free pending his appeal. Lula's lawyer accused the judge of bias and the judge replied that nobody, not even the former president, should be above the rule of law.

On 25 January 2018, the Appeal Court of Porto Alegre found Lula guilty of corruption and money laundering and increased his sentence to 12 years of prison for one of the nine charges, while the other eight were still pending. On 26 March 2018, that same court upheld its own sentence, thus ending the case in that court.

==== Imprisonment ====
On 5 April 2018, Brazil's Supreme Federal Court (STF) voted 6–5 to deny Lula's habeas corpus petition. The court ruled that Lula must begin serving his sentence relating to his 12 July 2017 graft conviction for taking bribes from an engineering firm in return for help to land contracts with state-run oil company Petroleo Brasileiro SA, despite him not having exhausted all of his appeals, but rather only one appeal, at which the appellate court had unanimously upheld his sentence. Brazilian financial markets rallied, as the decision increased the chances a market-friendly candidate winning the election.

Lula and his party vowed to continue his campaign from prison following the court's decision that he must surrender himself by 6 April. The head of Brazil's army, General Eduardo Villas Boas, called for Lula to be placed behind bars. Following Judge Moro's issuance of an arrest warrant for Lula on 6 April 2018, Lula appealed to the UN Human Rights Committee to – in addition to his primary case – take emergency action by asking the government of Brazil to prevent his arrest until he had exhausted all appeals, arguing that the Brazilian Supreme Court had narrowly adopted its ruling with only six votes against five, which "shows the need for an independent court". In June 2018, the Committee denied Lula's request.

Lula failed to turn himself in at the scheduled time, but he did so on the following day on 7 April 2018. After Lula was imprisoned, protesters took to the streets in cities across Brazil. Lula's imprisonment led to the formation of the Free Lula Movement.

On 28 May 2018, the UN Human Rights Committee initiated an investigation into Lula's case. In August, the Committee "requested Brazil to take all necessary measures to ensure that Lula can enjoy and exercise his political rights while in prison, as candidate in the 2018 presidential elections"; Brazil's foreign ministry noted that the recommendation had no legal significance.

On 8 July 2018, on-call weekend duty federal judge for the 4th region Rogério Favreto ordered Lula's release. Moro said that Favreto did not have the authority to release Lula, and Favreto's ruling was overturned the same day by the Judge Pedro Gebran Neto, president of the 4th regional court.

On 2 August 2018, Pope Francis received three former allies of Lula in Rome: Celso Amorim, Alberto Fernández and Carlos Ominami. Later, the pope addressed a handwritten note to Lula (posted on his Twitter account) with the following text: "To Luiz Inacio Lula da Silva with my blessing, asking him to pray for me, Francisco".

On 9 June 2019, The Intercept published leaked Telegram messages between the judge in Lula's case, Sergio Moro, and the Operation Car Wash lead prosecutor, Deltan Dallagnol, in which they allegedly conspired to convict Lula to prevent his candidacy for the 2018 presidential election. Moro was accused of lacking impartiality in Lula's trial. Following the disclosures, the resumption of legal proceedings was determined by the Supreme Court. Moro denied any wrongdoing or judicial misconduct during the course of Operation Car Wash and his investigation of Lula, claiming that the conversations leaked by The Intercept were misrepresented by the press and that conversations between prosecutors and judges are normal. Moro became Minister of Justice and Public Security after the election of president Jair Bolsonaro.

The information published by The Intercept prompted reactions both in Brazil and overseas. A group of 17 lawyers, ministers of Justice, and high court members from eight countries reacted to the leaks by describing former president Lula as a political prisoner and calling for his release. United States Senator Bernie Sanders said Lula should be released and his conviction annulled. American Congressman Ro Khanna asked the Trump administration to investigate Lula's case, saying that "Moro was a bad actor and part of a larger conspiracy to send Lula to jail". A number of international intellectuals, activists and political leaders, including professor Noam Chomsky and 12 US Congressmen, complained that the legal proceedings appeared to be designed to prevent Lula from running for president in 2018. American talk show host Michael Brooks, a vocal advocate for Lula, opined that Lula's imprisonment and Moro's alleged political motives had rendered the results of the 2018 election "fundamentally illegitimate".

==== Release ====
On 8 November 2019, Lula was released from prison after 580 days when the Brazilian Supreme Court ended mandatory imprisonment of convicted criminals after their first appeal failed. His release allowed him to remain out of prison until all of his appeals of his corruption and money laundering convictions were exhausted.

On 27 November, the Federal Regional Tribunal of Region 4 in Porto Alegre increased Lula's sentence to 17 years.

On 8 March 2021, Judge Edson Fachin of the Supreme Federal Court annulled all convictions against Lula, ruling that the court in Curitiba, in Paraná state, which convicted him lacked jurisdiction to do so because the crimes he was accused of did not take place in that state, as at the time Lula resided in the capital, Brasilia. Justice Fachin said the cases against him should therefore be retried by a court in that city. The judge did not rule as to whether Lula was guilty or not of the corruption charges. On 15 April, a full Supreme Court upheld the ruling in an 8–3 decision.

On 23 March 2021, the Supreme Federal Court ruled by a 3–2 decision that Moro, who had overseen Lula's trial in a case, was biased against him. On 23 June it upheld the ruling in a 7–4 decision. On 24 June, Judge Gilmar Mendes of the Supreme Federal Court annulled the two other cases Moro had brought against Lula, reasoning that there was a link between them and the case in which Moro was declared biased. This meant that all evidence Moro had collected against Lula was inadmissible in court, and that fresh trials would be needed.

== Between terms (2011–2023) ==
=== Health ===
On 29 October 2011, it was announced that Lula, a former smoker, had a malignant tumor in his larynx, which was detected after his voice became unusually hoarse. He had chemotherapy to treat the tumor, and was later treated with radiation therapy; his laryngeal cancer went into remission. Lula announced his recovery in March 2012.

On 21 January 2021, Lula tested positive for COVID-19 while participating in the filming of an Oliver Stone documentary in Cuba, five days after arriving on the island. He recovered without needing to be admitted to a hospital. On 13 March 2021, Lula received his first dose of the CoronaVac vaccine.

In October 2023, Lula had hip joint replacement surgery for a hip prosthesis, replacing the top of his right femur with an implant to treat his arthrosis. He also had a blepharoplasty, a cosmetic plastic surgery to remove excess skin from both of his eyelids.

=== 2018 presidential campaign ===
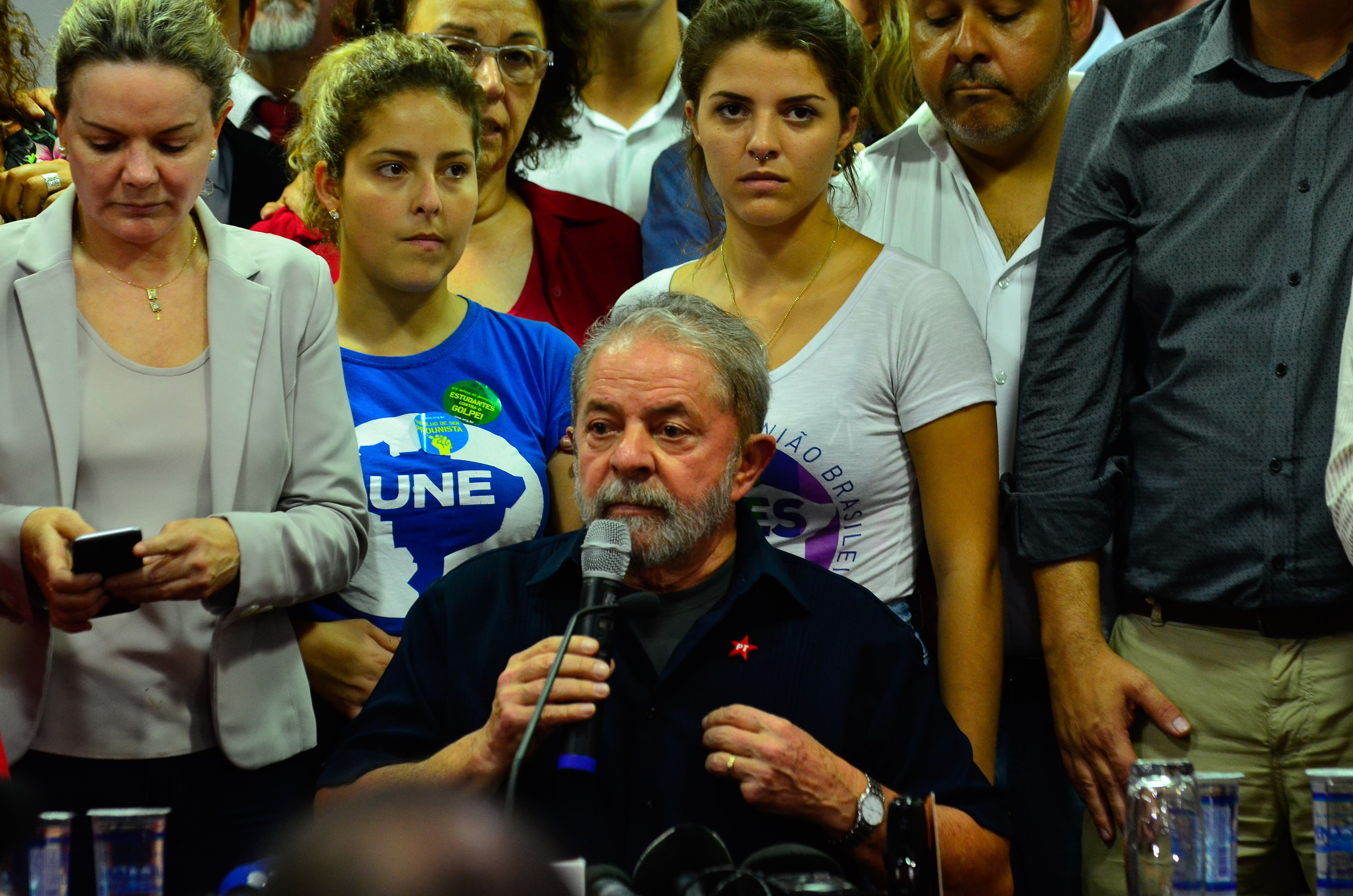
Lula in 2016

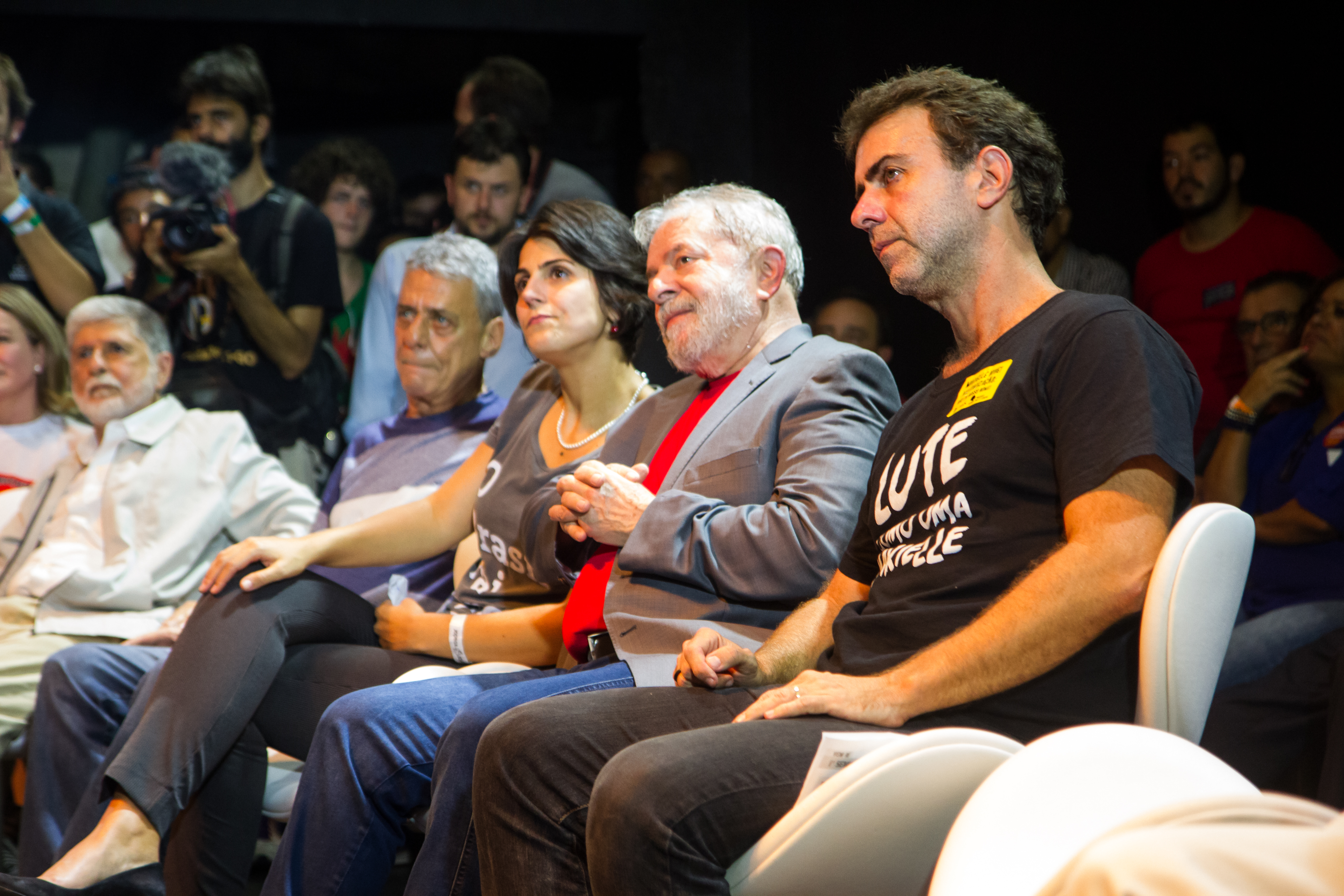
Lula with Brazilian politicians Manuela d'Ávila and Marcelo Freixo, 2018

In 2017, Lula announced he would stand as the Workers' Party candidate for president again in the 2018 election. In September, he led a caravan of supporters which travelled through the states of Brazil, starting with Minas Gerais, whose governor was Lula's political ally Fernando Pimentel. While traveling through the South of Brazil, the caravan became the target of protests. In Paraná, a campaign bus was shot at, and in Rio Grande do Sul, rocks were thrown at pro-Lula militants.

Despite Lula's imprisonment in April 2018, the Workers' Party kept Lula as the party's presidential candidate. In a poll conducted by Ibope in June 2018, Lula led with 33% of vote intentions, with the PSL candidate Jair Bolsonaro polling second with 15%. Lula negotiated a national coalition with the PCdoB and regional alliances with the Socialist Party.

The Workers' Party officially nominated Lula as its candidate on 5 August 2018, in São Paulo. Actor Sérgio Mamberti read a letter written by Lula, who was unable to attend because of his prison sentence. Former São Paulo mayor Fernando Haddad was named as Lula's running mate and intended to represent Lula in events and debates. If Lula was declared ineligible, Haddad would replace Lula as candidate, with Manuela d'Ávila replacing Haddad as the vice-presidential candidate.

In response to a petition from Lula, the UN Human Rights Committee on 17 August 2018 suggested to the Brazilian government that it allow Lula to exercise his political rights.

In a 26 August poll, Lula had 39 percent of vote intentions within one month of the first round. The same opinion polling put Lula ahead of all his challengers in a second round run-off, including the nearest one, PSL candidate Jair Bolsonaro, by 52 to 32.

Lula's candidacy was denied by the Superior Electoral Court on 31 August 2018 by a majority vote of the seven-judge panel. On 11 September 2018, Lula officially withdrew and was replaced by Fernando Haddad, whom Lula endorsed.

== Second presidency (2023–present) ==
=== 2022 presidential election ===
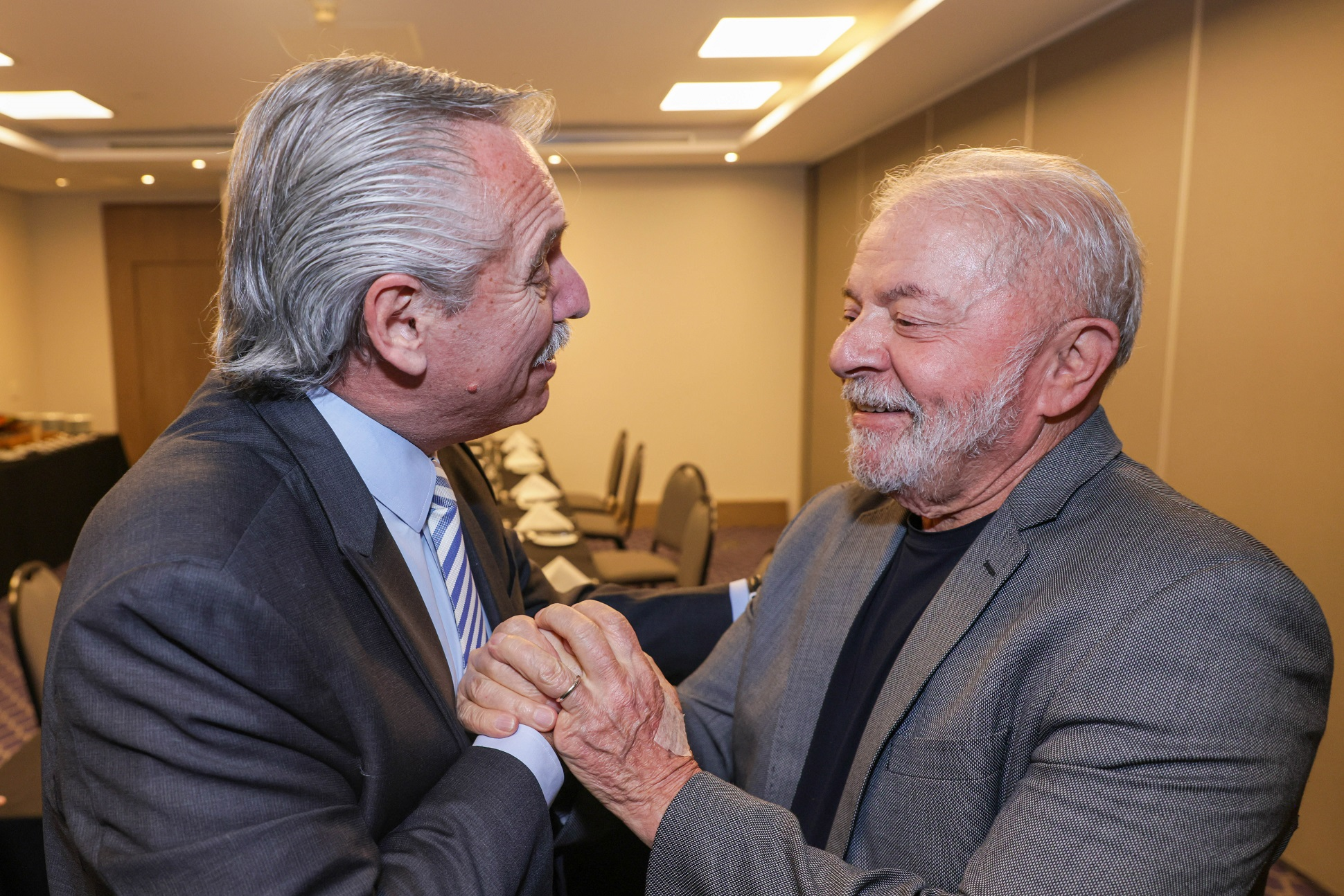
Lula with President of Argentina Alberto Fernández, 2022

In May 2021, Lula said that he would run for a third term in the October 2022 general election, against the incumbent President Jair Bolsonaro. He was 17% ahead of Bolsonaro in a poll in January 2022. In April 2022, Lula announced that his running mate would be Geraldo Alckmin, a three-term governor of São Paulo state who had run against Lula in the 2006 presidential elections.

On 2 October, in the first round vote, Lula was in first place with 48% of the electorate, qualifying for the second round with Bolsonaro, who received 43% of the votes. Lula was elected in the second round on 30 October with 50.89% of the vote, the smallest margin in the history of Brazil's presidential elections, three days after his 77th birthday. He became the first president of Brazil elected to three terms, the first since Getúlio Vargas to serve in non-consecutive terms, and the first to unseat an incumbent president. He was sworn in on 1 January 2023. At age 77, he was the oldest Brazilian president at the time of inauguration.

=== Tenure ===
Lula said that his main commitments were: the reconstruction of the country in the face of the economic crisis; democracy, sovereignty and peace; economic development and stability; fighting poverty; education; implementation of a National System of Culture and the expansion of housing programmes. He held the presidency of the G20 from 2023 (succeeding India) until the 2024 Brazilian G20 Summit, where after this the presidency was handed over to South Africa.

Lula's popularity declined; in September 2023, 38% of those polled considered him to be good or excellent, while 30% considered him to be average, and 31% viewed him as bad or terrible.

On 23 October 2025, Lula announced that he would run for reelection as president in the 2026 Brazilian general election.

==== Foreign policy ====
===== China =====
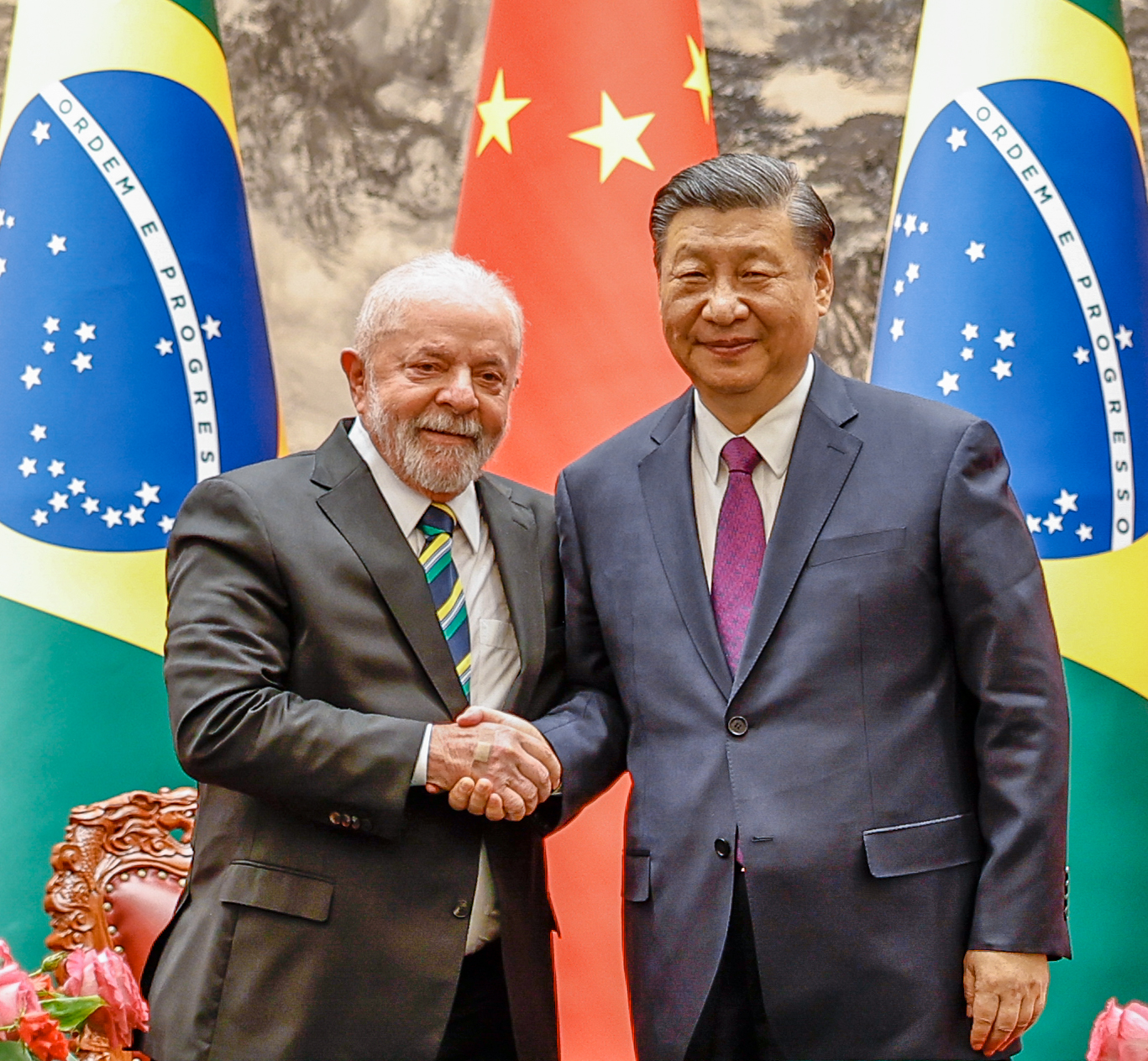
Lula and Chinese leader Xi Jinping, April 2023

In March 2023, Lula met in China with Chinese leader Xi Jinping, and signed 15 memoranda of understanding and 20 agreements on a wide range of issues. Lula gave a speech in which he said that no one would keep Brazil from improving its relationship with China—which was taken as a reference to the United States. In January 2024, Lula reaffirmed to Director of the Office of the Central Foreign Affairs Commission Wang Yi his recognition of China's policy of "one China", under which China claims Taiwan. Human Rights Watch, in the meantime, cautioned Lula against cozying up to China, while remaining silent about China's human rights abuses.

===== Cuba =====
In September 2023, Lula called Cuba a "victim" of an "illegal" United States embargo against Cuba. He also denounced the inclusion of Cuba on the US list of state sponsors of terrorism.

===== Iran =====
In March 2023, Lula's administration allowed two Iranian Navy warships, forward base ship IRIS Makran and frigate IRIS Dena, to dock in Rio de Janeiro. U.S. Ambassador to Brazil Elizabeth Bagley said that in the past the warships had facilitated terrorist activities, and US Senator Ted Cruz said that "the docking of Iranian warships in Brazil is a dangerous development and a direct threat to the safety and security of Americans."

Lula endorsed admitting Iran into the BRICS organization, and in August 2023 met with Iranian president Ebrahim Raeisi. Lula stopped short of condemning Iran's rights abuses.

===== Nicaragua =====
In June 2023, at an Organization of American States (OAS) summit, Lula tried to soften OAS criticism of Nicaragua's government, which was accused of repression and of violations of human rights and property rights. Nicaragua's former ambassador to the OAS, Arturo McFields, said that the proposed softening was "shameful," and that "President Lula is lying and telling another story that never existed in Nicaragua."

===== Russia =====
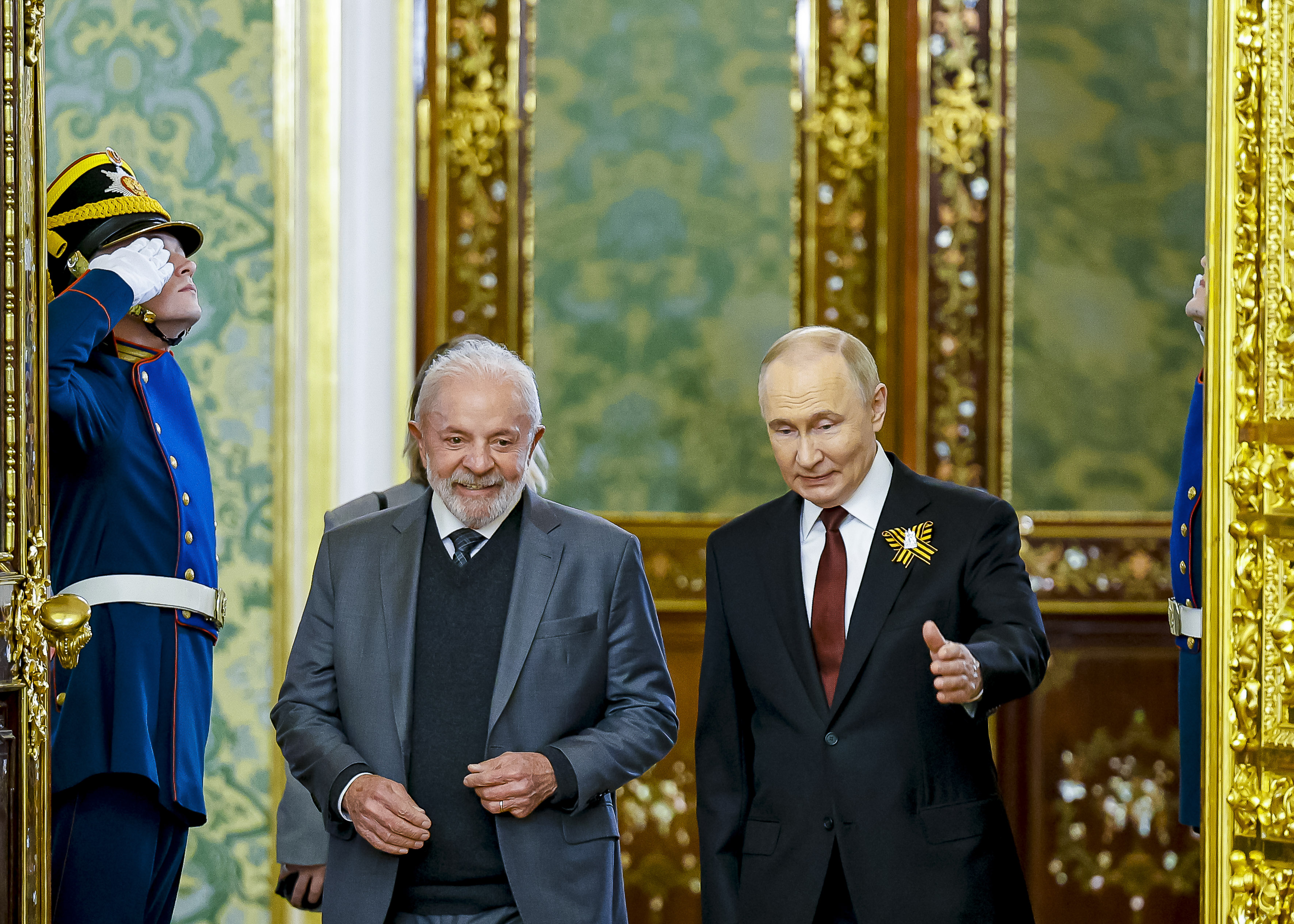
Lula with Russian President Vladimir Putin during the Victory Day celebrations in Moscow on 9 May 2025

In May 2023, he declined an invitation to the Saint Petersburg International Economic Forum, saying that he "can't visit Russia at the moment", while confirming that he had spoken to Putin. In December 2023, Lula said he would invite Vladimir Putin to the BRICS and G20 summits in Brazil. Due to Brazil being a signatory of the Rome Statute of the International Criminal Court, Putin could be placed under arrest by the Brazilian authorities if he sets foot on Brazil's territory. Lula said Putin could be arrested in Brazil, but that would be the decision of Brazil's independent courts, not his government. In February 2024, he was visited by Russian Foreign Minister Sergey Lavrov. In May 2025, he attended the Victory Day parade in Moscow.

===== Russian invasion of Ukraine =====
Lula has commented often on the Russo-Ukrainian War. He condemned the Russian invasion of Ukraine, but Ukraine called some of his comments as "Russian attempts to distort the truth".

In May 2022, Lula blamed both Russian President Vladimir Putin and Ukrainian president Volodymyr Zelenskyy for Russia's invasion of Ukraine, saying that Zelenskyy "is as responsible as Putin for the war". Lula also repeatedly criticized NATO and the European Union for being partially responsible for the war. He accused NATO of "claiming for itself the right to install military bases in the vicinity of another country". In April 2023, Lula declared after a state visit to China that "the United States needs to stop encouraging war and start talking about peace". U.S. National Security Council spokesman John Kirby responded by accusing Lula of "parroting Russian and Chinese propaganda", describing his comments as "simply misguided" and "suggesting the United States and Europe are somehow not interested in peace, or that we share responsibility for the war".

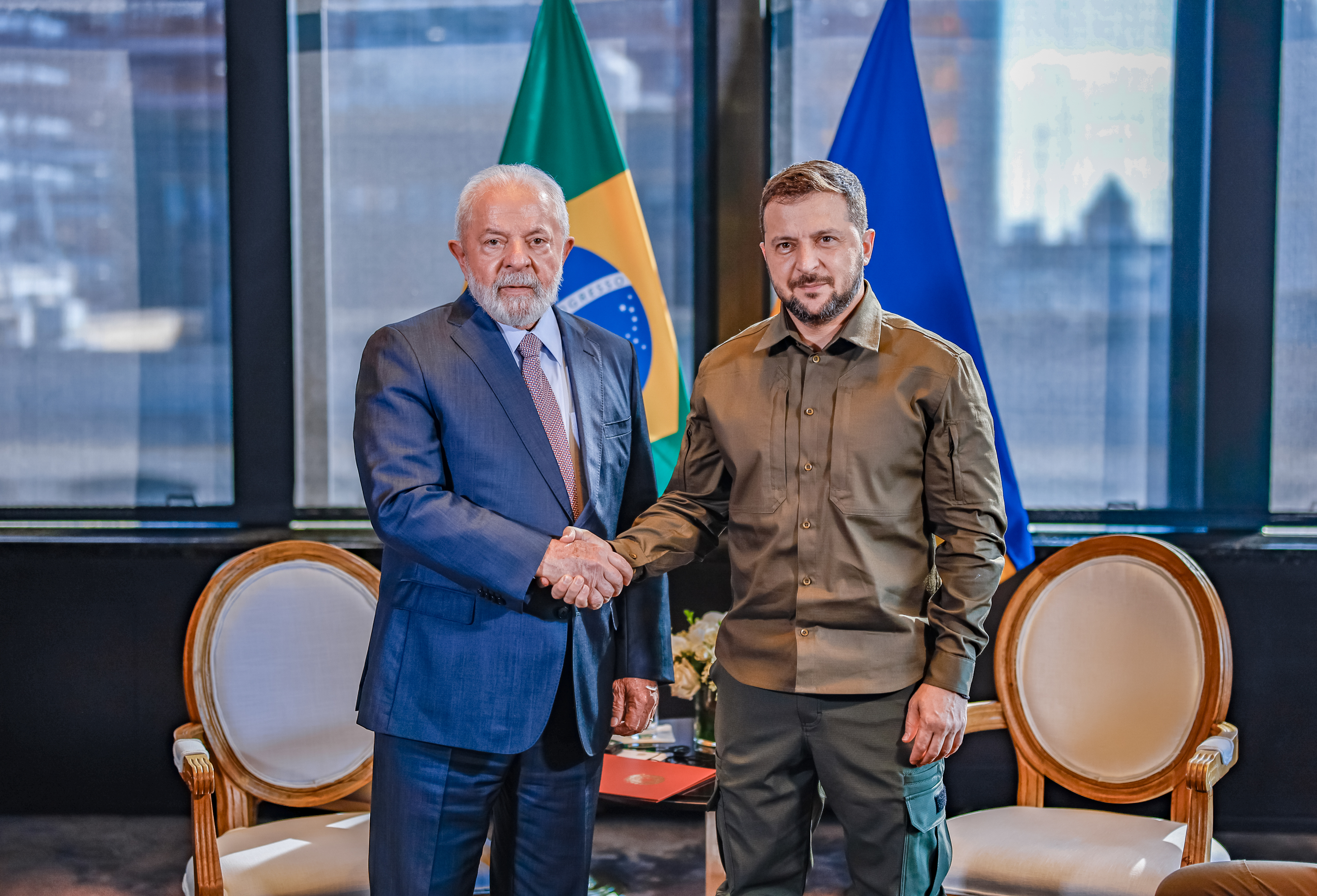
Lula with Ukrainian President Volodymyr Zelenskyy, 20 September 2023

In April 2023, Lula initially condemned Russia's violation of Ukraine's territorial integrity and said Russia should withdraw from Ukrainian territory it has occupied since February 2022. Later, however, that same month, he suggested that Ukraine should "give up Crimea" to Russia in exchange for peace and Russia's withdrawal from Ukrainian territory it occupied after February 2022, saying Zelenskyy "cannot want everything".

After Germany appealed to Lula to provide military aid to Ukraine by selling it arms, Lula refused. On 26 April, in a joint press conference, Spanish prime minister Pedro Sánchez questioned Lula's position, stressing that as the victimized country Ukraine needed to be supported. Lula said that he is seeking peace in accordance with a binding foreign policy principle in the pacifist Brazilian Constitution of 1988. He said that the countries of the Global South, including Brazil, India, Indonesia and China "want peace", but both Putin and Zelenskyy "are convinced that they are going to win the war" and do not want to talk about peace. He noted the human cost of the war, as well as the war's impact on food security, energy costs, and global supply chains.

===== Saudi Arabia =====
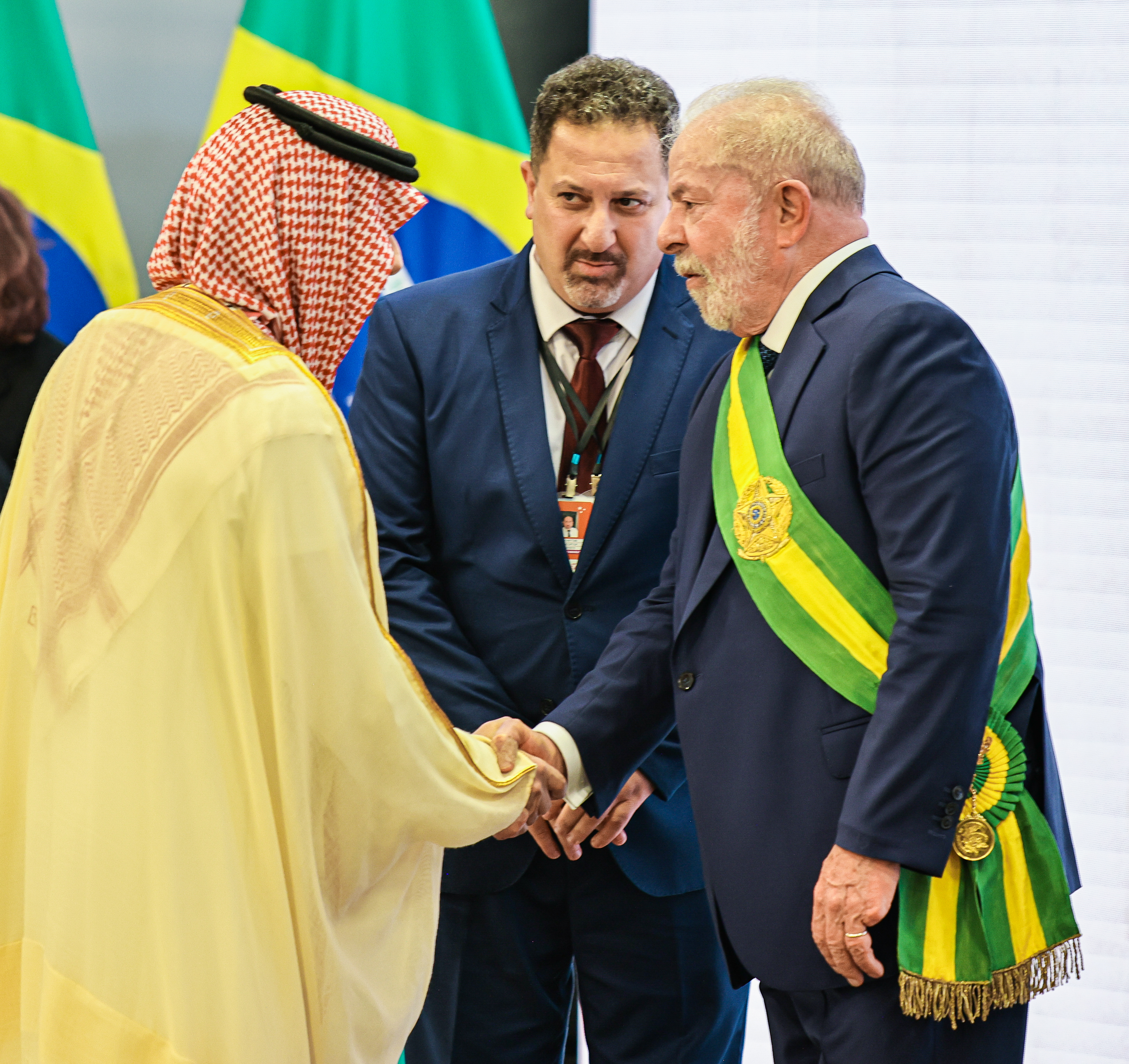
Lula with Saudi foreign minister Faisal bin Farhan Al Saud, 2023

In November 2023, Lula met in Riyadh with the prime minister and crown prince of Saudi Arabia, Mohammed bin Salman. They discussed strengthening bilateral relations, and investments in both countries. Salman said that a more robust strategic partnership between the two countries would benefit both sides. The $10 billion that the sovereign wealth fund of Saudi Arabia pledged to invest in Brazil was one topic of conversation. Lula mentioned Brazil's rapprochement with Arab countries. Salman also discussed Saudi Arabia's entry into BRICS in January 2024. Lula invited Salman to visit Brazil in 2024.

In February 2024, Saudi Ambassador to Brazil Faisal Ghulam participated in a reception held by the ambassadors of Arab and Islamic countries in honour of Lula, and on behalf of the ambassadors of the Arab and Islamic countries, Ghulam delivered a speech in which he reviewed the developing relations between the Arab and Islamic countries and Brazil.

===== Gaza war =====
Lula condemned the October 7 attacks. He subsequently called for a ceasefire in the Gaza war on 11 October, stating, it was "urgently needed in defence of Israeli and Palestinian children". Lula urged Hamas to release kidnapped Israeli children, and Israel to stop bombing the Gaza Strip and allow Palestinian children and their mothers to leave the war zone. On 25 October, Lula condemned the war as a genocide.

In February 2024, Lula drew comparisons of the war to the Holocaust, saying that the only historical equivalent was "when Hitler decided to kill the Jews." His remarks provoked outcry in Israel; he was accused of "blatant antisemitism" by Dani Dayan, the Chairman of Yad Vashem. Brazil's ambassador to Israel Frederico Meyer was recalled after these comments, and President Lula was designated a persona non grata in the State of Israel. Lula declined to apologise and despite having invoked a comparison with Adolf Hitler, he denied having said the word "Holocaust" and said "that was the interpretation of the prime minister of Israel."

===== United States =====
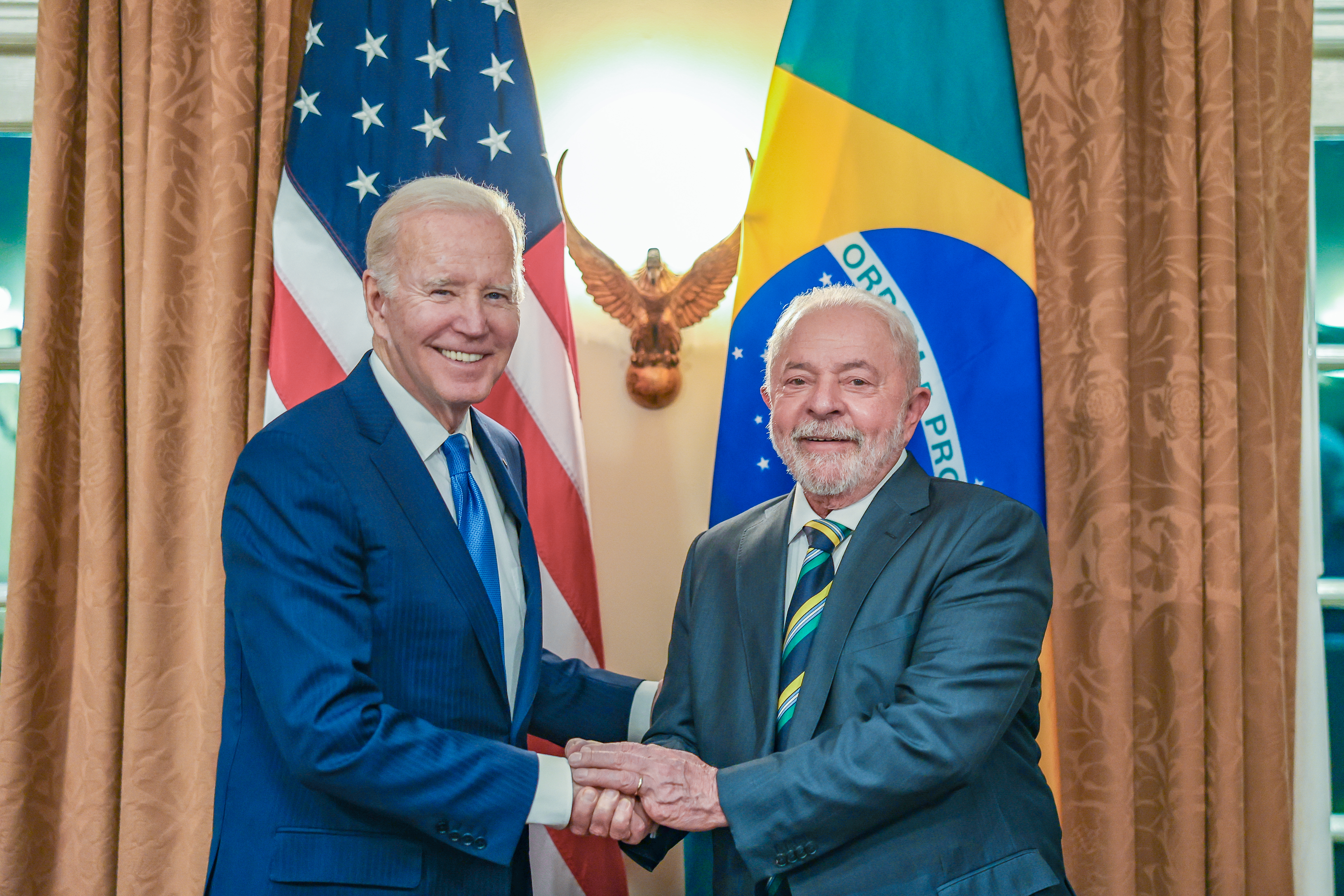
Lula and US President Joe Biden at the White House on 10 February 2023

Lula and US President Donald Trump at the White House on 7 May 2026

In April 2023, alluding to the support of the United States for Ukraine in the wake of the Russian invasion of Ukraine, Lula said that the US needs to "stop encouraging war." In May 2023, he said that US economic sanctions on Venezuela were "worse than a war" and "kill" women and children. In February 2024, University of São Paulo foreign policy expert Feliciano de Sa Guimaraes said Lula only listens to one side in his government, "the left-wing, anti-American voices who very aggressively speak of a radical change in the global order."

Brazilian President Luiz Inácio Lula da Silva has been making international headlines for standing his ground against Washington. After the G7 meeting, Lula reacted to President Trump's vocal support of the Bolsonaro family and how Brazil's judicial system dealt with them. "He is entitled to his electoral and ideological preferences. As far as I'm concerned, he can continue liking Bolsonaro, the father, the son, the grandson... there's no accounting for taste. Now, don't meddle in the Brazilian elections, because the Brazilian elections are a Brazilian problem, just as American elections are their business, not mine. All I want is the same respect for Brazil that I have for the United States. That's it."

He also took direct aim at Trump's reported foreign policy remarks, suggesting the U.S. president does not understand Latin America. He was also critical of the president's desire to take control of Greenland, Panama and Canada. "The world is full of madmen," he said.

===== Venezuela =====
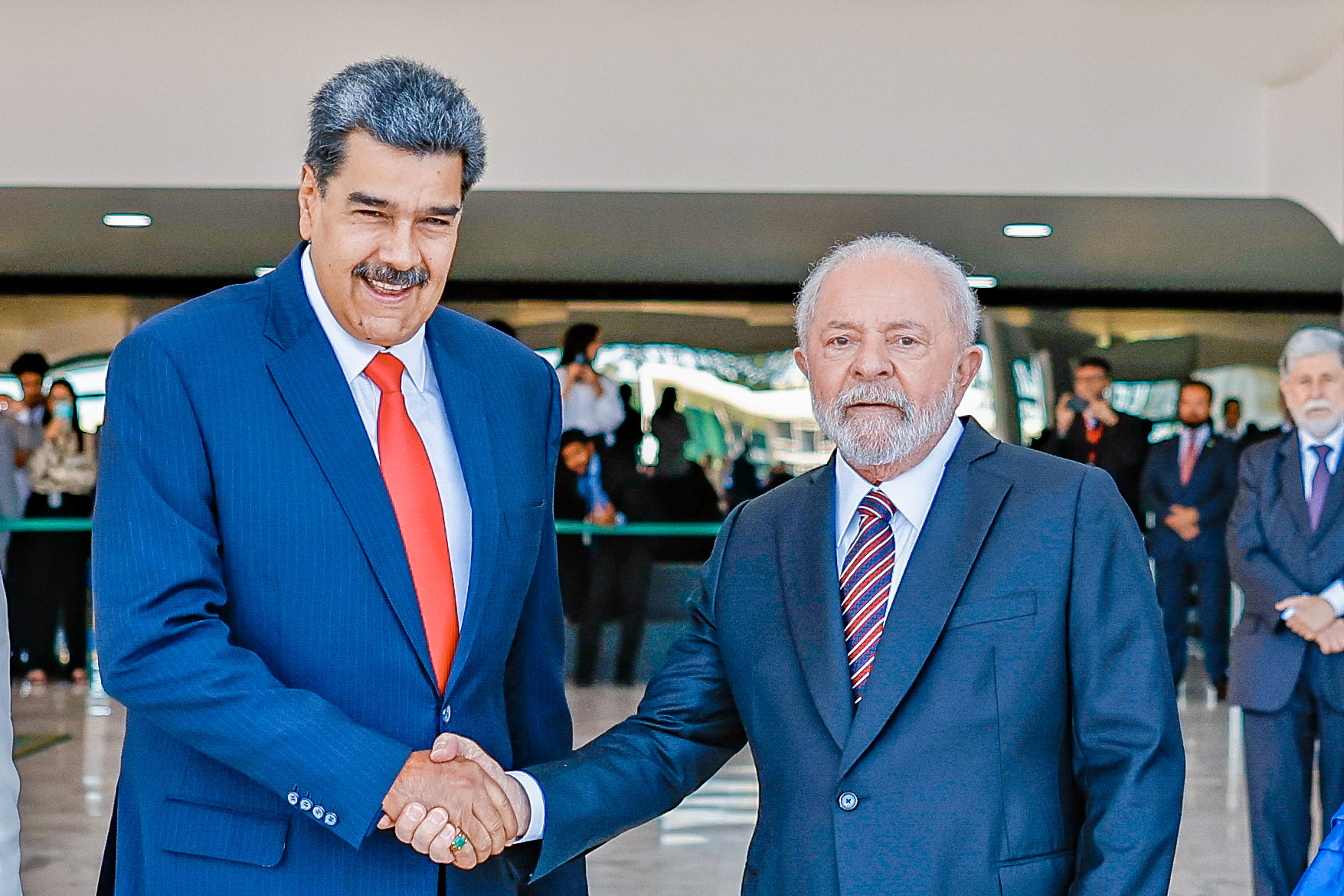
Lula meeting with Venezuelan President Nicolás Maduro, May 2023

Lula restored diplomatic ties that Brazil had cut off with Venezuela's Nicolas Maduro government after 2018 elections that had been condemned by critics as a sham. In March 2023, Lula refused to join 54 other nations and sign a United Nations declaration criticizing Venezuela's human rights abuses. In May 2023 Lula met with Maduro in Brazil.

In May 2023, Lula warmly embraced and fully supported Venezuela's authoritarian leftist President Nicolás Maduro. Lula dismissed charges against Maduro of human rights and civil rights abuses as a political "constructed narrative." Lula was criticized by Uruguay's President Luis Lacalle Pou, who said that the "worst thing we can do" is pretend there are no significant human rights problems in Venezuela, and by Chile's President Gabriel Boric, who said that Lula was making light of human rights violations in Venezuela. Lula also criticized as "unjustified" U.S. sanctions on Venezuela for its alleged human rights abuses, and criticized the United States for denying the legitimacy of Maduro, who the U.S. said had not allowed free elections.

In August 2024, amid Venezuelan protests against Maduro, Lula described Maduro's government as "a very unpleasant regime" with an "authoritarian slant", but not a dictatorship. Regarding Maduro's victory in the 2024 Venezuelan presidential election, which UN election experts said lacked "basic transparency and integrity", Lula said that Maduro should either hold new elections or form a coalition government. Both Maduro and the opposition rejected these suggestions.

==== Economy ====
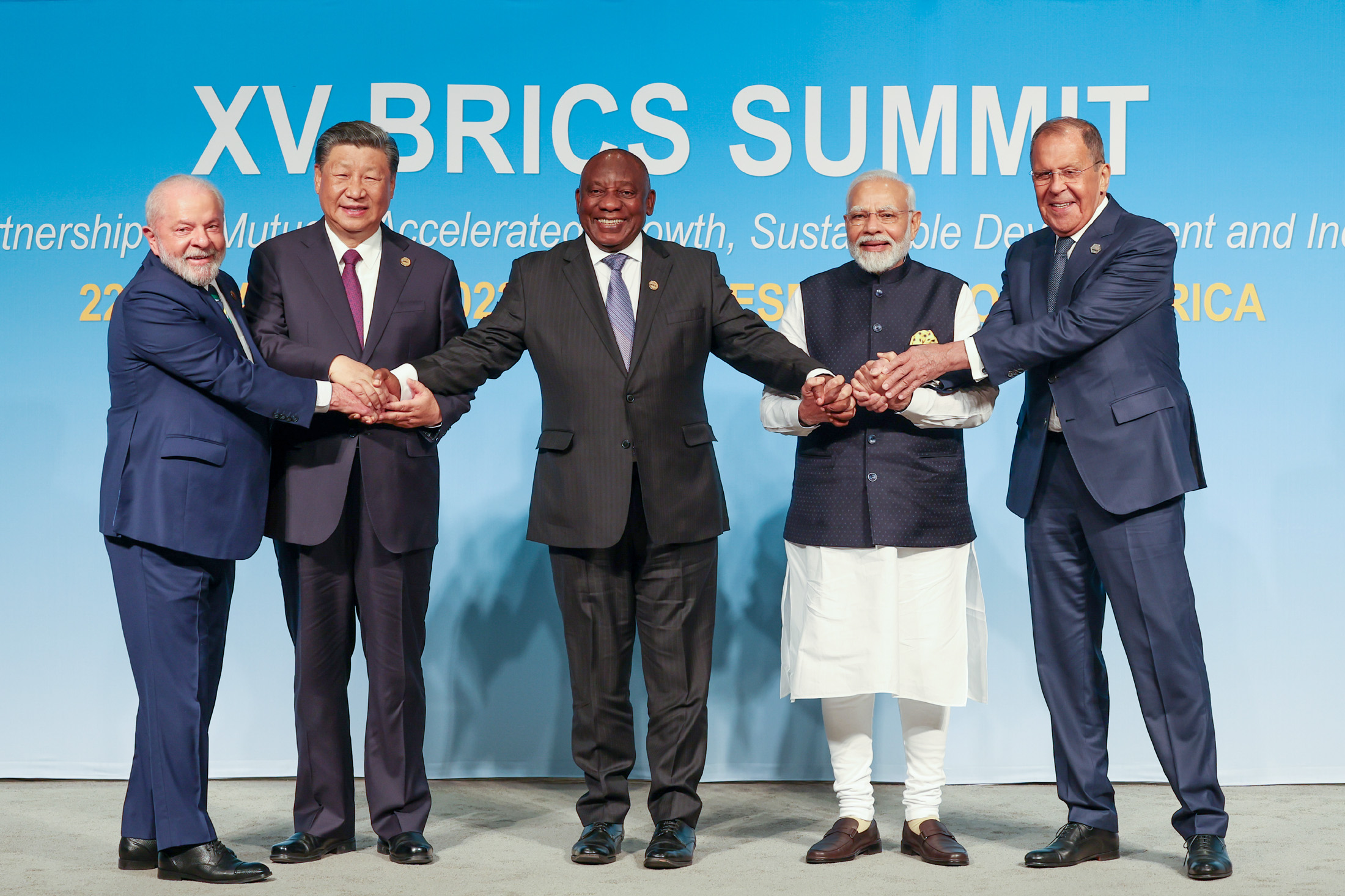
Lula and other BRICS leaders at the 15th BRICS Summit, August 2023, in Johannesburg

In March 2023, Lula reinforced the Bolsa Família program. The programme was created during the first term of Lula and then significantly cut by Jair Bolsonaro, with its goal being help to around 60 million Brazilians suffering from poverty. According to the World Bank estimates, the reinforced programme would reduce the poverty rate in Brazil to 24.3% – the level before the COVID-19 pandemic.

In August 2023, Lula announced a vast infrastructure investment programme of over $350 billion over four years. Part of this sum is earmarked to finance the "My home, my life" social housing project. It also includes 100 billion for energy and 65 billion for transport and roads. Education and health are also concerned, with the construction of schools and hospitals. The project also aims to boost economic growth and develop clean energy.

At the beginning of September 2023, he presented a major plan to eradicate hunger, as 33 million Brazilians do not have enough to eat, and more than half the country is affected to varying degrees by some form of food insecurity. To this end, he set up a national network of food banks to prevent waste, increased the budget allocated to school meals, and increased the purchase of food from family farms to supply public canteens. These measures are part of a broader policy to build social housing and raise the minimum wage and other social benefits. The fight against world hunger is also high on the Brazilian president's international agenda.

In the first quarter of 2023, Brazilian economy grew by 1.9%. In the second quarter, by 0.9%, 3 times more than expected, while many of the neighbors of Brazil saw a shrinkage in their economy. The possible reasons of this phenomenon included reduced inflation, a good harvest, and an improved credit rating. The economic policy of Lula regarding taxation, spending, public ownership of some companies probably played a major role in this. Explaining his economic philosophy Lula once said: "[Brazilians] need to understand that the money that exists in this country needs to circulate in the hands of many people," "We do not want the concentration of wealth. We want more people to have access to credit to make the wheel of the economy turn. The growing economy needs to be distributed."

In 2025, Lula became the first Brazilian president since 1992 to have one of his decrees overturned by Congress following its rejection of a proposal to raise a financial transactions tax.

==== Environment ====
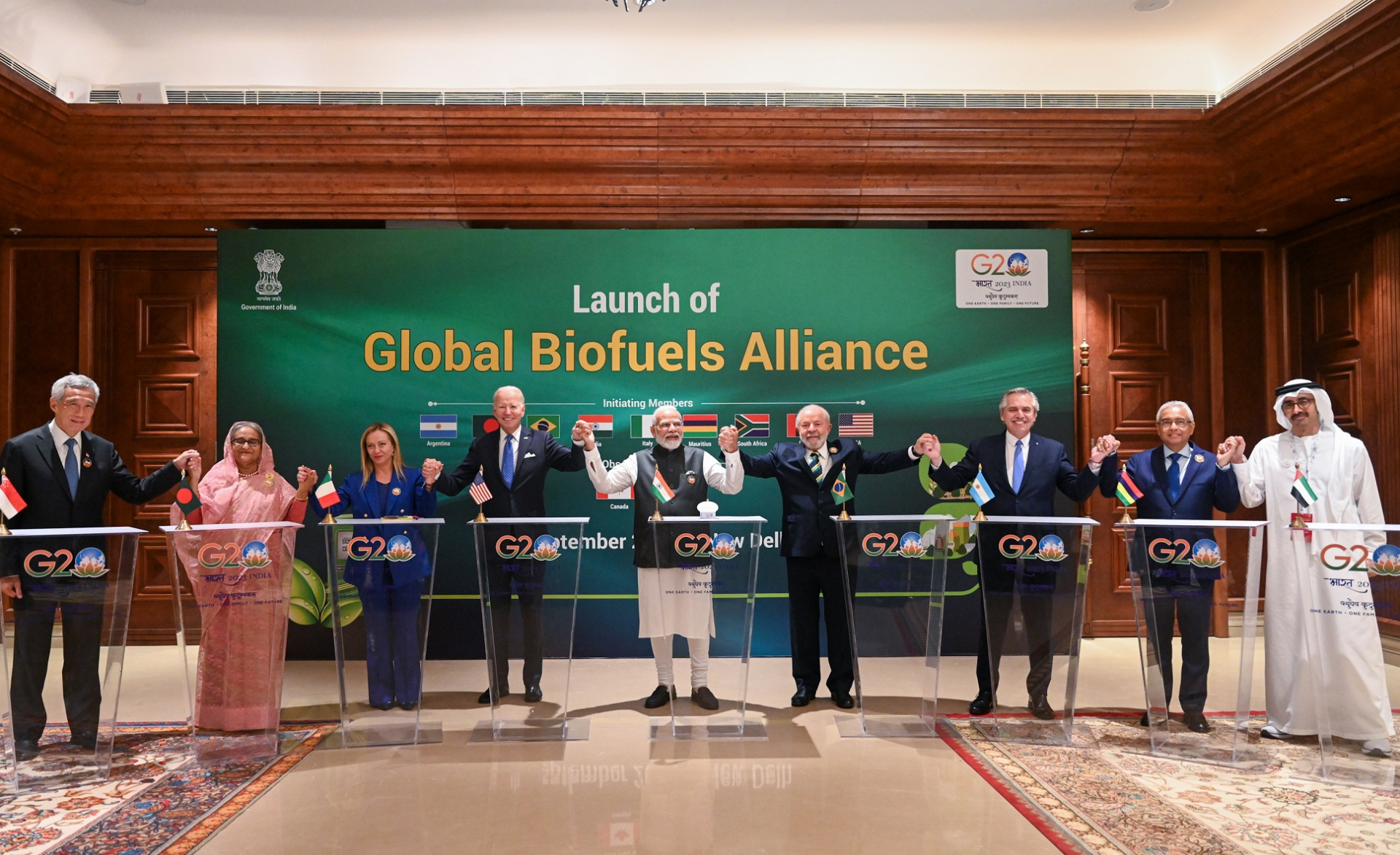
Launch of the Global Biofuel Alliance at the 2023 G20 New Delhi summit

During his campaign, Lula pledged to end illegal logging. In 2004, Lula had presented a road map for curbing deforestation. It was part of "The Action Plan for the Prevention and Control of Deforestation in the Legal Amazon", which sought to decrease deforestation in the Amazon by 80% by 2020. This plan was largely responsible for the 83% decrease in the Amazon deforestation rate in the years 2004 through 2012, but it was suspended during Bolsonaro's presidency. Lula re-affirmed the plan's goals in his third term, with a new target of zero illegal deforestation by the year 2030. The plan includes different measures for creating a sustainable economy in the Amazon region, like bioeconomy, rural credits and managed fishing.

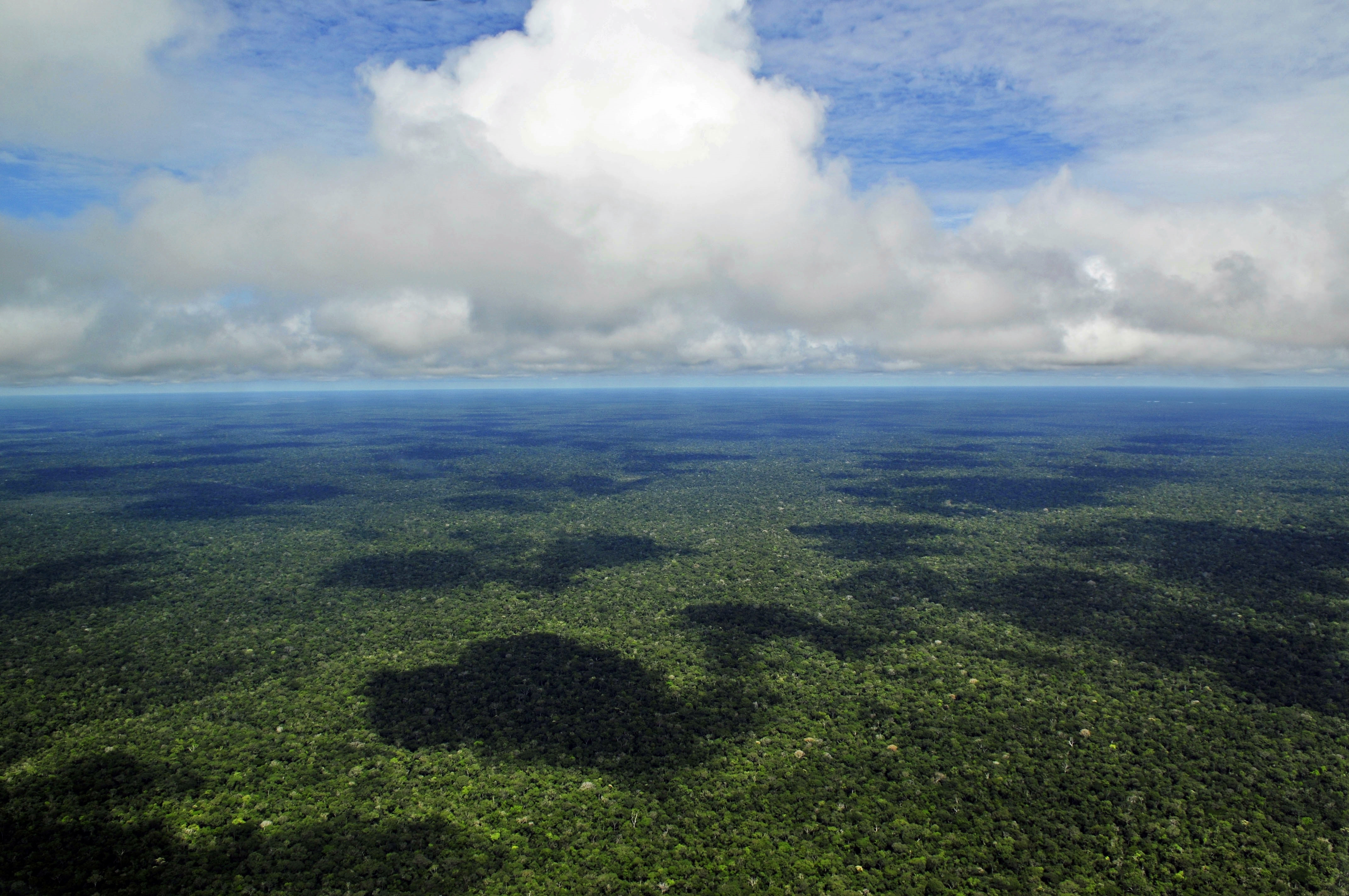
The Amazon rainforest near Manaus, Brazil

According to Amazon Conservation's MAAP forest monitoring programme, the deforestation rate in the Brazilian Amazon from 1 January to 8 November 2023 decreased by 59% in comparison to the same period in 2022. In July 2023 the deforestation rate was 66% lower than in July 2022. In the beginning of August Lula participated in the Belem summit, 8 Amazonian nations renewed the Amazon cooperation treaty. However, there are concerns that illegal loggers have partly moved their action from the Amazon rainforest to Cerrado, where the environmental destruction has increased. As a whole, the rate of primary forest loss declined in Brazil by 36% in 2023.

Bolsonaro had strongly cut spending for security in the Brazilian Amazon, and in 2022, 34 environmental defenders were murdered in this region. When Lula re-assumed office, he sent troops to restore law enforcement in the region. In October 2023, there were still "reports of violence, threats, torture, intimidation, attempts at criminalization and other non-lethal violations".

In April, Biden pledged to give $500 million to the Amazon Fund which was frozen during the rule of Bolsonaro and reactivated when Lula returned to power, to deal with climate change. According to John Kerry, the overall financial help from US to Brazil for stopping deforestation through different channels will be around 2 billion US dollars.

Lula and French president Emmanuel Macron agreed about cooperation between Brazil and France on different environmental issues, including the transmission of 1.1 billion dollars for preserving the Amazon rainforest.

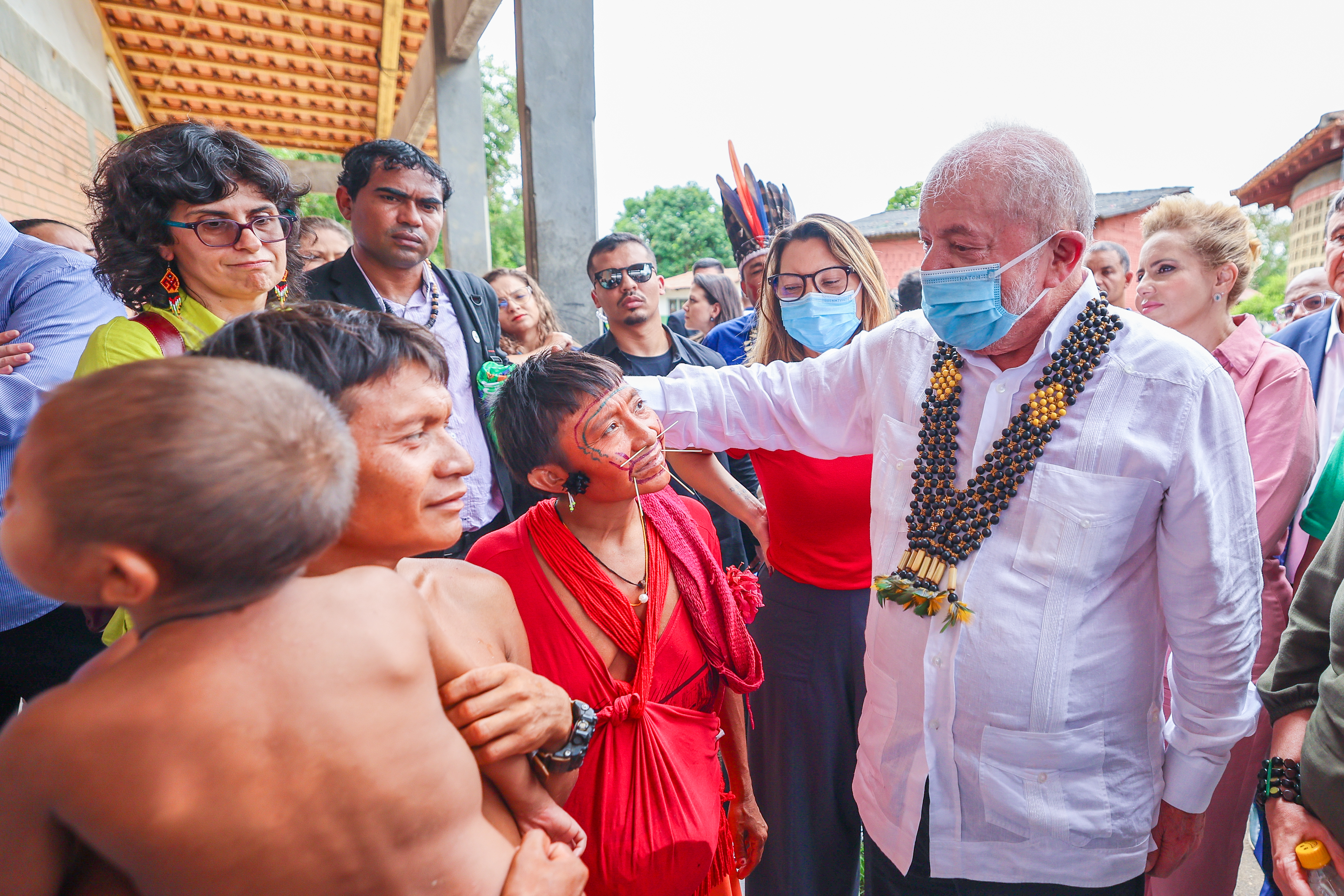
Lula visits the Yanomami people in the Brazilian state of Roraima during the Yanomami humanitarian crisis in January 2023

Lula pledged to recognize 14 new indigenous reserves. Six were recognized as of May 2023. Lula and American president Joe Biden committed to work together on the issue.

Several hours after Lula talked about leaving fossil fuels at the 2023 United Nations Climate Change Conference (also known as COP28), his government held an auction in which it offered 603 territorial blocks for oil extraction. The territories cover 2% of the territory of Brazil, overlap with many protected areas or areas belonging to indigenous people and can result in a release of 1 gigaton of CO_{2}.

Lula has expressed support for the paving of BR-319, a project initiated by the Bolsonaro government. Although he argues that the project can be done sustainably, one study found that the road could enable deforestation on a scale of territory the size of Florida by 2030. A court blocked the project in July 2024, saying that the government lacked a plan to combat the deforestation that would follow the implementation of the project.

In November 2025, Lula took the unusual step for a head of state of personally attending the COP30 conference in Belem in an attempt to smooth over geopolitical rifts preventing a climate deal from being reached.

==== Freedom of the press ====
In March 2023, the Lula government launched a campaign to fight "misinformation". The initiative was viewed by many as a tool for Lula's administration to delegitimize criticism it faces—under the guise of "fact-checking", and raised serious concerns about freedom of expression. In response, the senior programme director of the International Centre for Journalists, Christina Tardáliga, tweeted "There is no such thing as government fact-checking. This appropriation of the term is misguided and offensive. What the government does is propaganda."

==== Health problems ====
In late October 2024, Lula suffered a fall in the official residence, which resulted in trauma to the back of his head and a small brain hemorrhage in the temporal-frontal region, prompting him to cancel, under advice from his doctors, a planned trip to a BRICS summit in Russia. In December of the same year, he was admitted to hospital after complaining of a headache. A brain haemorrhage was discovered after an MRI scan, and an emergency craniotomy was performed. The intracranial haemorrhage was attributed to his fall in October. After the operation he was reported to be recovering in intensive care.

In May 2025, Lula was diagnosed with labyrinthitis after suffering from vertigo. In January 2026, Lula underwent cataract surgery on his left eye at a hospital in Brasilia.

=== 2026 presidential election ===
In September 2026, President Luiz Inácio Lula da Silva campaigned for a fourth, non-consecutive presidential term. His campaign emphasized social and economic policies, while his administration also promoted measures to reduce domestic fuel prices amid higher international oil prices. Lula remained one of the two leading candidates ahead of the first-round vote scheduled for 4 October. He finished with 45% of the vote, trailing Jair Bolsonaro's son Flavio Bolsonaro, who won a plurality of 47%. They both contested a runoff vote on 25 October. He was officially declared the winner on 25 October after winning 51.8% of the vote.

== Political positions and philosophy ==
Lula has advocated "socialism of the 21st century", but Lulism, his ideology, is considered to be substantially similar to social liberalism. Although he showed a moderate centre-left liberal tendency economically, he highlighted his closeness with the Bolivarian Republic of Venezuela and negatively evaluated Juan Guaidó during the Venezuelan crisis. He is "personally against" abortion, but maintains that it should be treated as a public health issue.

=== Palestine ===
Lula criticized the decisions by Western countries to cut funding to UNRWA and in response pledged to the Palestinian government that Brazil would increase its funding to UNRWA. Lula has called for a two-state solution with Palestine "definitively recognised as a full and sovereign state".

On 18 February 2024, Lula told reporters in Addis Ababa, Ethiopia, while attending the African Union Summit, "What's happening in the Gaza Strip isn't a war, it's a genocide. ... It's not a war of soldiers against soldiers. It's a war between a highly prepared army and women and children. ... What's happening in the Gaza Strip with the Palestinian people hasn't happened at any other moment in history. Actually, it has happened: when Hitler decided to kill the Jews".

== Honours and awards ==
The list of Lula's awards since 2003:

- In 2008 he was awarded the UNESCO Félix Houphouët-Boigny Peace Prize.
- In 2012 he received the Four Freedoms Award.
- In 2025, the Brazilian frog species Brachycephalus lulai was named in his honor.

=== National honours ===
Ribbon bar	Honour	Date & Comment	Ref.
	Grand Cross of the Order of the Southern Cross	2003 – automatic upon taking presidential office	
	Grand Cross of the Order of Rio Branco	2003 – automatic upon taking presidential office	
	Grand Cross of the Order of Military Merit	2003 – automatic upon taking presidential office	
	Grand Cross of the Order of Naval Merit	2003 – automatic upon taking presidential office	
	Grand Cross of the Order of Aeronautical Merit	2003 – automatic upon taking presidential office	
	Grand Cross of the Order of Military Judicial Merit	2003 – automatic upon taking presidential office	
	Grand Cross of the National Order of Merit	2013	

==== State honours ====
Ribbon bar	Honour	Date & Comment	Ref.
	Grand Cross of the Aperipê Order of Merit	2008 – Given by Governor of Sergipe	
	Grand Necklace of the Inconfidence Medal	2008 – Given by Governor of Minas Gerais	

=== Foreign honours ===
Ribbon bar	Country	Honour	Date	Ref.
	Algeria	Grand Cross of the National Order of Merit	7 February 2006	
	Benin	Grand Cross of the National Order of Benin	17 March 2013	
	Bolivia	Collar of the Order of the Condor of the Andes	17 December 2007	
	Cape Verde	Grand Cross of Amílcar Cabral Order	29 July 2004	
	Colombia	Grand Collar of the Order of Boyacá	14 December 2005	
	Cuba	Grand Cross of the Order of Carlos Manuel de Céspedes	20 December 2019	
	Denmark	Knight of the Order of the Elephant	12 September 2007	
	Ecuador	Grand Collar of the National Order of San Lorenzo	6 June 2013	
	Gabon	Grand Cross of the Order of the Equatorial Star	28 July 2004	
	Ghana	Companion of the Order of the Star of Ghana	13 April 2005	
Medalha Amílcar Cabral	Guinea-Bissau	Member of the Order of Amílcar Cabral	25 August 2010	
	Guyana	Member of the Order of Excellence of Guyana	25 November 2010	
	Japan	Grand Cordon of the Supreme Order of the Chrysanthemum	18 March 2025	
	Mexico	Collar of the Order of the Aztec Eagle	3 August 2007	
	Norway	Grand Cross of the Order of St. Olav	7 October 2003	
	Norway	Grand Cross of the Royal Norwegian Order of Merit	13 September 2007	
	Palestine	Grand Collar of the State of Palestine	2010	
	Panama	Grand Cross of the Order of Omar Torrijos Herrera	10 August 2007	
	Paraguay	Grand Collar of the Order of Marshal Francisco Solano López	2007	
	Peru	Grand Cross with Diamonds of the Order of the Sun	25 August 2003	
	Portugal	Grand Cross of the Order of the Tower and Sword	5 March 2008	
	Portugal	Grand Collar of the Order of Liberty	23 July 2003	
	Portugal	Grand Collar of the Order of Camões	22 April 2023	
	Spain	Knight of the Collar of the Order of Isabella the Catholic	11 July 2003	
	Saudi Arabia	Chain of the Order of Abdulaziz Al Saud	16 May 2009	
	South Africa	Member of the Order of the Companions of O. R. Tambo	27 April 2011	
	Sweden	Knight of the Royal Order of the Seraphim	11 September 2007	
	Syria	Member First Class of the Order of the Umayyads	2010	
	Ukraine	Member First Class of the Order of Prince Yaroslav the Wise	2003	
	Ukraine	Member of the Order of Liberty	2009	
	United Kingdom	Knight Grand Cross of the Order of the Bath	7 March 2006	
	Zambia	Grand Commander of the Order of the Eagle of Zambia	2010	

=== Foreign awards ===
Country	Award	Date	Ref.
Spain	Princess of Asturias Award for International Cooperation	October 2003	
India	Jawaharlal Nehru Award	June 2007	
Portugal	Honoris Causa Doctor in Economics, University of Coimbra	March 2011	
France	Doctor Honoris Causa, Sciences Po Paris	September 2011	
Poland	Lech Wałęsa Prize	September 2011	
India	Indira Gandhi Prize	November 2012	
United Kingdom	Honorary President of Young Labour (UK)	October 2018	
France	Honorary citizen of Paris	March 2020	
Argentina	Doctor Honoris Causa, Universidad Nacional de Rosario	May 2020	
Uruguay	Más Verde Prize	January 2023	
Bolivia	Key to the City of Santa Cruz de la Sierra	July 2024	
United States	Global Goalkeeper Award	September 2024	
France	Doctor Honoris Causa, Paris 8 University	June 2025	
France	Académie Française Award	June 2025	
Malaysia	Doctor Honoris Causa, National University of Malaysia	October 2025	
Mozambique	Doctor Honoris Causa, Maputo University	November 2025	

== In popular culture ==
Academy Award-nominated Brazilian director Fábio Barreto directed the 2009 Brazilian biographical film Lula, Son of Brazil that depicts the life of Lula up to 35 years of age. Upon its release, it was the most expensive Brazilian film ever. The film was a commercial and critical failure. Critics charged that it was election propaganda, fostering a cult of personality.

The Netflix Brazilian series The Mechanism deals with Operation Car Wash, and has a character inspired by Lula, who is referred to as João Higino in the series.

The 2019 Brazilian documentary, The Edge of Democracy, written and directed by Petra Costa, chronicled the rise and fall of Lula and Dilma Rousseff, and the socio-political upheaval in Brazil during the period. Lula is also featured in the director's 2024 documentary Apocalypse in the Tropics.

== See also ==
- List of current heads of state and government
- List of heads of the executive by approval rating

== Notes ==
Chamber of Deputies (Brazil)
Preceded by Irma Passoni	Leader of the Workers' Party in the Chamber of Deputies; 1987–1988	Succeeded by Plínio de Arruda Sampaio
Political offices
Preceded by Fernando Henrique Cardoso	President of Brazil; 2003–2011	Succeeded by Dilma Rousseff
Preceded by Jaques Wagner	Chief of Staff of the Presidency; 2016 (suspended)	Vacant Title next held by Eliseu Padilha
Preceded by Jair Bolsonaro	President of Brazil; 2023–present	Incumbent
Party political offices
New political party	National President of the Workers' Party; 1980–1988	Succeeded by Olívio Dutra
Preceded by Luiz Gushiken	National President of the Workers' Party; 1990–1994	Succeeded by Rui Falcão
New political party	Workers' Party nominee for President of Brazil; 1989, 1994, 1998, 2002, 2006	Succeeded by Dilma Rousseff
Preceded by Dilma Rousseff	Workers' Party nominee for President of Brazil; 2018 (ineligible)	Succeeded by Fernando Haddad
Preceded by Fernando Haddad	Workers' Party nominee for President of Brazil; 2022	Most recent
Diplomatic posts
Preceded by (India) Narendra Modi	Chairperson of the Group of 20; 2024	Succeeded by (South Africa) Cyril Ramaphosa
Order of precedence
First	Brazilian order of precedence 1st in order as President of Brazil	Followed by Geraldo Alckmin as Vice President of Brazil
