= Antero Greco =

Brazilian journalist and publisher

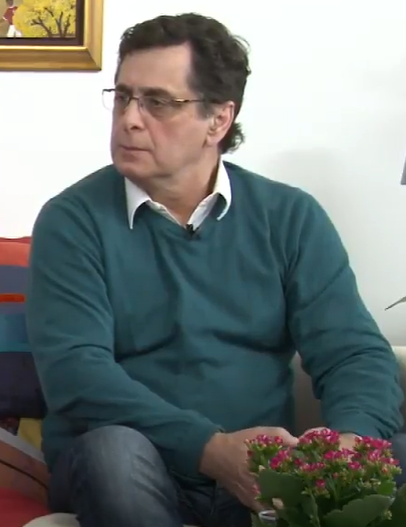
- Born: June 2, 1954; São Paulo, São Paulo, Brazil
- Died: May 16, 2024 (aged 69); São Paulo, São Paulo, Brazil
- Citizenship: Brazilian
- Education: University of São Paulo
- Occupation: Journalist

Antero Greco (June 2, 1954 (Note: Sources differ regarding his year of birth. Some indicate 1955, while others state that Greco was born in 1956. His official birth certificate, however, records his birth date as 2 June 1954.) – May 16, 2024) was a Brazilian journalist. He was a commentator on ESPN Brasil's SportsCenter and also appeared on games broadcast by ESPN channels. He was also a columnist for the newspaper O Estado de S. Paulo and had a blog on the newspaper's website.

== Biography ==
Born in the Bom Retiro neighborhood of São Paulo, the son of Italian immigrants Giovanni Greco and Ernestina Ferraro, Antero attended Liceu Coração de Jesus, a school run by priests from the Catholic Salesians of Don Bosco congregation.

He earned a degree in journalism from the School of Communications and Arts, University of São Paulo (ECA-USP), the institution is affiliated with the University of São Paulo (USP). He began his journalism career in 1974 as a copy editor at O Estado de S. Paulo newspaper. Three years later, he was promoted to sports reporter. In that department, he also served as news editor, special correspondent, and assistant editor. In 1989, he left the newspaper to join Agência Estado (AE), a news agency network affiliated with the same publishing group. In early 1992, he returned to Estadão to serve as sports editor, a position he held until the end of 1993. Between January 1994 and December 2000, he worked at Diário Popular as a news editor, assistant editor, and columnist.

He returned to Estadão in late 2000. Between September 2006 and December 2009, he once again served as the newspaper’s sports editor. On November 14, 2018, Antero left the newspaper.

Antero also had brief stints at the now-defunct newspaper Popular da Tarde, Folha de S.Paulo, and Band. At Band, he took part in the first broadcasts of the Italian Championship, Serie A in 1983, alongside play-by-play announcer Edgard de Mello Filho and commentator Pedro Luiz Paoliello.

=== ESPN ===
His association with ESPN Brasil began in February 1994, when he was invited by journalist José Trajano to join the channel’s first broadcast team (at the time, it was still known as TVA Esportes, from Grupo Abril), alongside play-by-play announcer Nivaldo Pietro and reporters Paulo Calçade and Gilvan Ribeiro. At the network, he helped create the program Futebol no Mundo, for which he also served as a writer until early 2000.

Later that year, he also began appearing on SportsCenter, which replaced Trinta Minutos, a change introduced during the 2000 Summer Olympics. He then teamed up with Paulo Soares, known as Amigão, and before long, the two had established themselves as the show’s official hosts.

The late-night news show is a trademark of ESPN channels, and the duo won over the public with the laid-back style in which they hosted the program. Antero and Amigão’s frequent fits of laughter, triggered mainly by the funny names of athletes mentioned in the segments and occasional verbal gaffes, became internet hits and gave the show its rhythm, while also lending a distinct identity to the Brazilian version of the American-format program.

== Personal life ==
Antero had been married to Leila for decades. The couple had two sons and two grandchildren. For decades, he lived in the Sumaré neighborhood of São Paulo. In his youth, he played right back for amateur soccer teams and even considered pursuing a religious life as a priest before deciding to become a journalist. An avowed SE Palmeiras fan, and because of his family ties, he also had a soft spot for the Italian clubs AS Roma and SSC Napoli. He identified as a Catholic.

In the 2022 presidential election, he announced his support for Luiz Inácio Lula da Silva.

=== Death ===
On May 10, 2024, Paulo Soares, known as Amigão, with whom he had co-hosted the Sportscenter program for several years, announced that Antero had been suffering from a brain tumor since 2022, which was already in an advanced stage. The journalist made the announcement in a letter published in Juca Kfouri’s column on Universo Online (UOL), titled “Antero Lives”.

Previously, during a live broadcast on SporstCenter, Antero fell ill on air and had to leave the show and go to the hospital. His health had been poor ever since.

Antero died from complications related to his tumor on the morning of May 16, 2024, at the age of 69. Several soccer clubs and fellow journalists paid tribute to the journalist; in addition, ESPN Brasil aired a special edition of SportsCenter in his honor, featuring several journalists who have worked for the network, including current and former employees. Coincidentally, Antero Greco passed away on the same day as sports commentator Silvio Luiz and the day after the death of Washington Rodrigues, known as Apolinho, all of them major figures in Brazilian sports, particularly soccer.

Antero was laid to rest at Redentor Cemetery in the Sumaré neighborhood of São Paulo.

== Awards and nominations ==
Year	Award	Category	Result	Ref.
2011	ACEESP Trophy	Print Newspaper Columnist	Nominated	
2014	ACEESP Trophy	Print Newspaper Columnist	Nominated	
2021	Prêmio Comunique-se	Sports: Print Media	Nominated	
