= 2026 WXV =

Women's international rugby union competitions

2026 WXV Global Series & Challenger

Tournament details
- Host: Various (Global Series); Hong Kong (Global Series Challenger)
- Dates: 12 September – 31 October 2026
- Teams: 18 (12 in Global Series, 6 in Global Series Challenger)
- Website: wxvrugby.com

The 2026 WXV Global Series and 2026 WXV Global Series Challenger were the inaugural editions of the two successors to WXV, consisting of fixtures for women's national teams organised by participating national unions and World Rugby. Replacing the original three-tier WXV tournament, this new structure moves the top 12 nations into a home-and-away cross-regional touring model (the WXV Global Series), while six emerging nations compete at a single host venue funded by World Rugby (the WXV Global Series Challenger).

The 2026 editions are the first year of a fixed three-year cycle running from 2026 to 2028, fully aligned with the qualification pathway for the 2029 Women's Rugby World Cup.

== Background ==
The WXV Global Series was announced in September 2025 during the 2025 Women's Rugby World Cup in England. The rankings used to determine positions in the series were set at the end of 2024 WXV, and teams remain fixed in these throughout the 2026–2028 cycle, as agreed with participating unions.

== Format ==
The top 12 teams compete in home-and-away touring fixtures arranged directly between member unions, with each team playing between four and six matches within an eight-week global window from the second week of September to the last week of October. Unions retain domestic commercial rights to their home fixtures.

The six emerging nations compete at Kai Tak Sports Park in Hong Kong from 13 to 26 September, with triple-header matchdays on 13, 19 and 26 September.

World Rugby has also confirmed that the women's-specific size 4.5 ball trial, which began at the 2025–26 SVNS, will be extended to the 15-a-side game through these competitions.

There is no promotion or relegation between the Global Series and the Challenger during the 2026–2028 cycle.

== WXV Global Series ==
2026 WXV Global Series
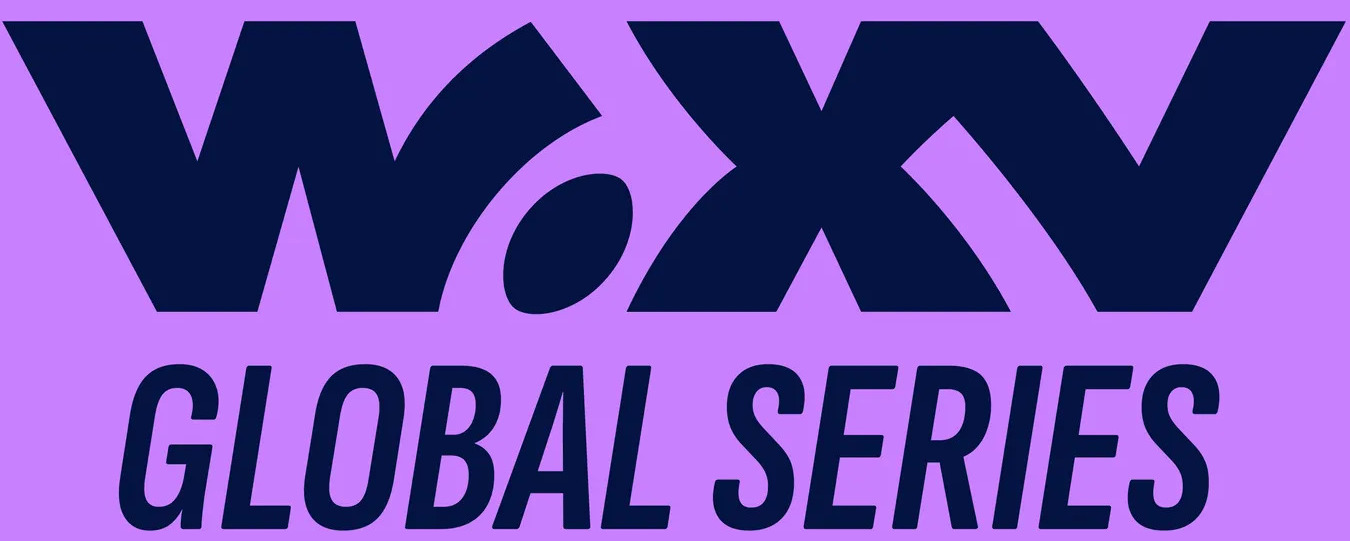

Tournament details
- Host: Various
- Dates: 12 September – 31 October 2026
- Teams: Australia; Canada; England; France; Ireland; Italy; Japan; New Zealand; Scotland; South Africa; United States; Wales

The 2026 WXV Global Series features home-and-away touring fixtures arranged between member unions across the September–October international window. The 12 participating nations remain fixed in the series for the 2026–2028 cycle with no promotion or relegation.

=== Participating nations ===
Nation	Stadium			Competition	Regional association	World Rugby ranking
Nation	Home stadium	Capacity	Location	Competition	Regional association	World Rugby ranking
Australia	Stadium Australia	80,000	Sydney	Pacific Four Series	Oceania	9
Australia	Canberra Stadium	25,011	Canberra	Pacific Four Series	Oceania	9
Canada	BMO Field	28,745	Toronto	Pacific Four Series	North America	3
Canada	TD Place Stadium	25,269	Ottawa	Pacific Four Series	North America	3
England	Twickenham Stadium	82,000	London	Six Nations	Europe	1
England	CorpAcq Stadium	11,404	Sale	Six Nations	Europe	1
England	Sandy Park	15,600	Exeter	Six Nations	Europe	1
France	Stade de Gerland	35,029	Lyon	Six Nations	Europe	4
France	Stade Maurice David	8,787	Aix-en-Provence	Six Nations	Europe	4
France	Stade Marcel-Deflandre	18,000	La Rochelle	Six Nations	Europe	4
Ireland	Tallaght Stadium	10,547	Dublin	Six Nations	Europe	5
Ireland	Dexcom Stadium	10,500	Galway	Six Nations	Europe	5
Italy	Stadio Omero Tognon	5,000	Fontanafredda	Six Nations	Europe	6
Japan	Chichibunomiya Rugby Stadium	24,871	Tokyo	Asia Rugby Women's Championship	Asia	11
Japan	Kumagaya Rugby Ground	25,600	Kumagaya	Asia Rugby Women's Championship	Asia	11
New Zealand	Waikato Stadium	25,800	Hamilton	Pacific Four Series	Oceania	2
New Zealand	Okara Park	18,500	Whangārei	Pacific Four Series	Oceania	2
New Zealand	Te Kaha	25,000	Christchurch	Pacific Four Series	Oceania	2
Scotland	The Hive	7,800	Edinburgh	Six Nations	Europe	7
Spain	Instalaciones deportivas La Cartuja	1,500	Seville	Rugby Europe Women's Championship	Europe	14
South Africa	Athlone Stadium	34,000	Cape Town	Rugby Africa Women's Cup	Africa	10
United States	Texas Health Mansfield Stadium	7,000	Mansfield	Pacific Four Series	North America	8
United States	Geodis Park	30,109	Nashville	Pacific Four Series	North America	8
United States	Sports Illustrated Stadium	25,000	Harrison	Pacific Four Series	North America	8
Wales	Cardiff Arms Park	12,125	Cardiff	Six Nations	Europe	13

=== Fixtures ===
Fixtures are arranged directly between member unions.

Confirmed test series
Home	Away	No.	Dates	Details	Ref.
France	New Zealand	1	12 September	Series details	
France	Australia	1	19 September	Series details	
France	Canada	1	26 September	Series details	
England	Australia	1	12 September	Series details	
England	Canada	1	19 September	Series details	
England	New Zealand	1	26 September	Series details	
Scotland	Canada	1	12 September	Series details	
Scotland	New Zealand	1	19 September	Series details	
Scotland	Australia	1	26 September	Series details	
Wales	South Africa	1	18 September	Series details	
Wales	United States	1	26 September	Series details	
Italy	Japan	1	19 September	Series details	
Italy	South Africa	1	26 September	Series details	
Ireland	United States	1	20 September	Series details	
Ireland	Japan	1	27 September	Series details	
Canada	England	2	16–23 October	Series details	
Spain	South Africa	1	4 October	Series details	
Australia	Scotland	2	17–23 October	Series details	
New Zealand	France	3	17–31 October	Series details	
United States	Italy	2	17–24 October	Series details	
United States	England	1	30 October	Series details	
South Africa	Ireland	2	24–31 October	Series details	
Japan	Wales	2	24 October	Series details	

==== Match week 1 (12 September) ====
12 September 2026	England	48–15	Australia	CorpAcq Stadium, Salford
12 September 2026	Scotland	26–64	Canada	Edinburgh Rugby Stadium, Edinburgh
12 September 2026	France	14–28	New Zealand	Stade de Gerland, Lyon

==== Match week 2 (18–20 September) ====
18 September 2026	Wales	50–19	South Africa	Cardiff Arms Park, Cardiff
19 September 2026	Italy	55–21	Japan	Stadio Omero Tognon, Fontanafredda
19 September 2026	England	26–26	Canada	Sandy Park, Exeter
19 September 2026	France	29–26	Australia	Stade Maurice David, Aix-en-Provence
19 September 2026	Scotland	14–66	New Zealand	Edinburgh Rugby Stadium, Edinburgh
20 September 2026	Ireland	36–40	United States	Tallaght Stadium, Dublin

==== Match week 3 (26–27 September) ====
26 September 2026	Italy	29–41	South Africa	Stadio Omero Tognon, Fontanafredda
26 September 2026	England	26–19	New Zealand	Twickenham Stadium, London
26 September 2026	Wales	24–26	United States	Cardiff Arms Park, Cardiff
26 September 2026	Scotland	10–30	Australia	Edinburgh Rugby Stadium, Edinburgh
26 September 2026	France	21–5	Canada	Stade Marcel-Deflandre, La Rochelle
27 September 2026	Ireland	31–24	Japan	Dexcom Stadium, Galway

==== Match week 4 (4 October) ====
4 October 2026	Spain	0–20	South Africa	Instalaciones deportivas La Cartuja, Seville

==== Match week 5 (16–17 October) ====
16 October 2026	Canada	24–21	England	BMO Field, Toronto
17 October 2026	Australia	56–12	Scotland	Stadium Australia, Sydney
17 October 2026	New Zealand	81–12	France	Waikato Stadium, Hamilton
17 October 2026	United States	36–27	Italy	Texas Health Mansfield Stadium, Mansfield

==== Match week 6 (23–24 October) ====
23 October 2026	Australia	38–31	Scotland	Canberra Stadium, Canberra
23 October 2026	Canada	31–22	England	TD Place Stadium, Ottawa
24 October 2026	New Zealand	31–12	France	Okara Park, Whangārei
24 October 2026	Japan	0–17	Wales	Prince Chichibu Memorial Stadium, Tokyo
24 October 2026	South Africa	27–40	Ireland	Athlone Stadium, Cape Town
24 October 2026	United States	54–24	Italy	Geodis Park, Nashville

==== Match week 7 (30–31 October) ====
30 October 2026	United States	12–55	England	Sports Illustrated Stadium, Harrison
31 October 2026	New Zealand	36–7	France	Te Kaha, Christchurch
31 October 2026	Japan	5–29	Wales	Kumagaya Rugby Ground, Kumagaya
31 October 2026	South Africa	17–38	Ireland	Athlone Stadium, Cape Town

== WXV Global Series Challenger ==
2026 WXV Global Series Challenger
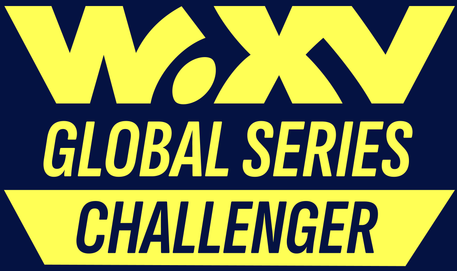

Tournament details
- Host: Hong Kong
- Dates: 13 – 26 September 2026
- Teams: Brazil; Fiji; Hong Kong China; Netherlands; Samoa; Spain

The 2026 WXV Global Series Challenger will take place at Kai Tak Sports Park in Hong Kong from 13 to 26 September 2026, with triple-header matchdays on 13, 19 and 26 September. The competition is fully funded by World Rugby and uses the cross-pool format of the previous WXV system, with two pools of three teams each playing the three teams from the other pool.

=== Participating nations ===
Nation	Competition	Regional association	World Rugby ranking
Brazil	—N/a (Note: South America does not have a competition structure for their national women's XV teams)	South America	25
Fiji	Oceania Rugby Women's Championship	Oceania	12
Hong Kong China	Asia Rugby Women's Championship	Asia	16
Netherlands	Rugby Europe Women's Championship	Europe	17
Samoa	Oceania Rugby Women's Championship	Oceania	15
Spain	Rugby Europe Women's Championship	Europe	14

=== Pools ===
The pools have been arranged as follows:

WXV Global Series Challenger
Team	Competition	Region
Europe and Asia Pool
Hong Kong	Asia Rugby Women's Championship	Asia
Spain	Rugby Europe Women's Championship	Europe
Netherlands	Rugby Europe Championship	Europe
Americas and Pacific Pool
Brazil	No regional Competition	South America
Samoa	Oceania Rugby Women's Championship	Oceania
Fiji	Oceania Rugby Women's Championship	Oceania

=== Fixtures ===
Fixtures are scheduled for 13, 19 and 26 September 2026 at Kai Tak Sports Park, Hong Kong.

==== Match week 1 (13 September) ====
12:00; 13 September 2026	Spain	32–38	Fiji	Kai Tak Youth Sports Ground, Hong Kong
15:30; 13 September 2026	Hong Kong China	29–24	Brazil	Kai Tak Youth Sports Ground, Hong Kong
19:00; 13 September 2026	Netherlands	70–0	Samoa	Kai Tak Youth Sports Ground, Hong Kong

==== Match week 2 (19 September) ====
12:00; 19 September 2026	Samoa	21–59	Spain	Kai Tak Youth Sports Ground, Hong Kong
15:30; 19 September 2026	Fiji	54–26	Hong Kong China	Kai Tak Youth Sports Ground, Hong Kong
19:00; 19 September 2026	Brazil	15–17	Netherlands	Kai Tak Youth Sports Ground, Hong Kong

==== Match week 3 (26 September) ====
17:00 (Note: Delayed due to World Rugby's heat protocols); 26 September 2026	Fiji	20–17	Netherlands	Kai Tak Youth Sports Ground, Hong Kong
20:15; 26 September 2026	Hong Kong China	17–34	Samoa	Kai Tak Youth Sports Ground, Hong Kong
26 September 2026	Spain	Cancelled (Note: Cancelled due to World Rugby's heat protocols)	Brazil	Kai Tak Youth Sports Ground, Hong Kong

== See also ==
- 2026 women's rugby union internationals
- WXV Global Series
- WXV Global Series Challenger
- 2026 Nations Championship
