= José Trajano =

Brazilian journalist and writer

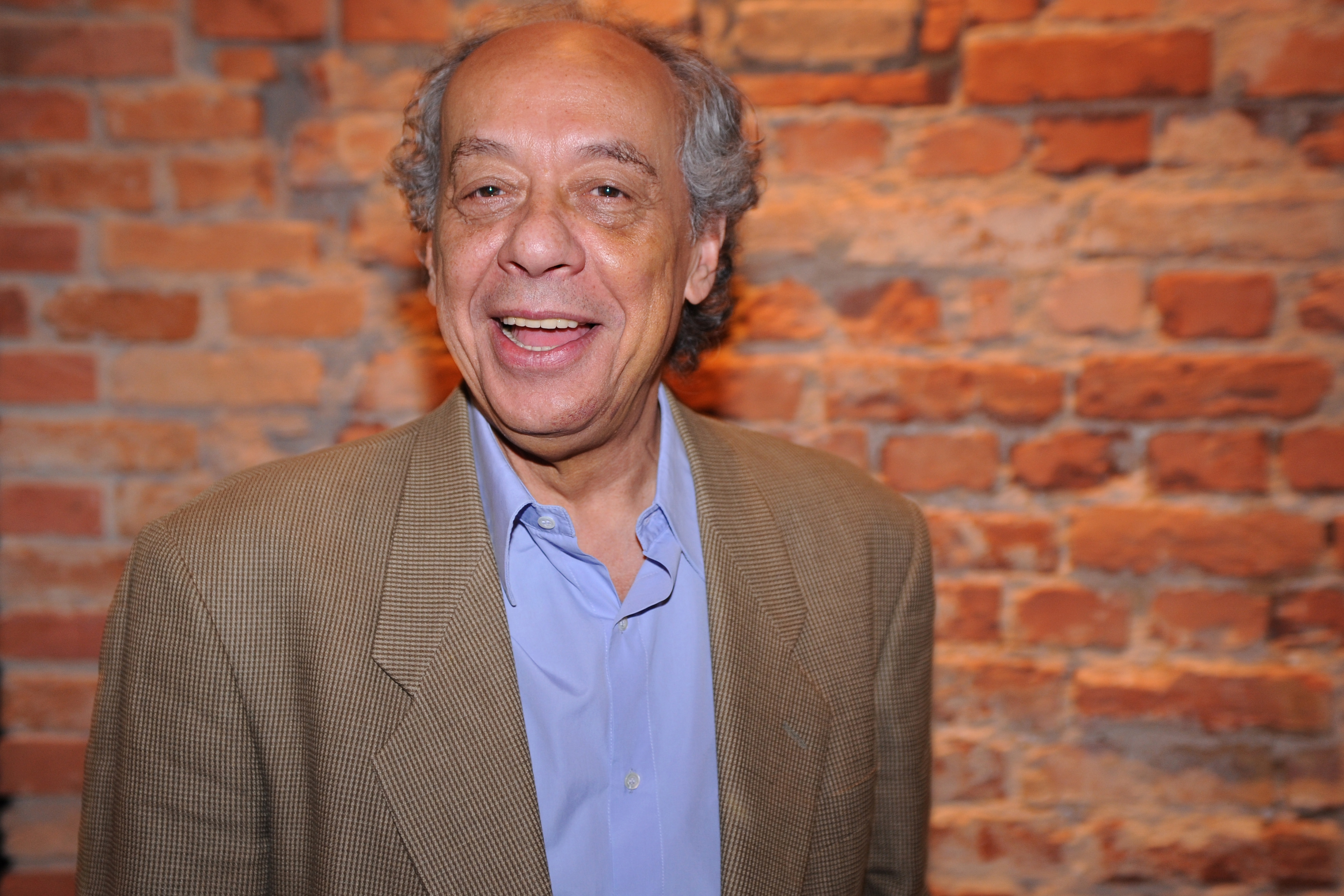
- Trajano in 2013
- Born: José Trajano Reis Quinhões; 21 October 1946 (age 80); Rio de Janeiro, Distrito Federal, Brazil
- Citizenship: Brazilian
- Education: Colégio de São Bento
- Occupation: Journalist
- Employer: ESPN Brasil
- Known for: ESPN Brasil
- Website: http://www.ultrajano.com.br/

José Trajano Reis Quinhões (October 21, 1946) is a Brazilian journalist and writer. He was the director of journalism and one of the founders of ESPN Brasil alongside Laércio Roma and Júlio Bartolo. He is also a small business owner in the communications field, creating exclusive content on his website and social media under the name “Ultrajano,” where he blends sports analysis with political commentary.

== Biography ==
=== First years ===
He was born in Tijuca, a neighborhood in Rio de Janeiro, the son of a history and geography teacher and a homemaker. As a child, he spent a lot of time at a family farm in Rio das Flores, in the interior of Rio de Janeiro. He attended the prestigious Colégio de São Bento in downtown Rio, but dropped out before finishing high school.

His first job was when he was still a teenager, at age 16, in 1963, at the Jornal do Brasil.

=== Career ===
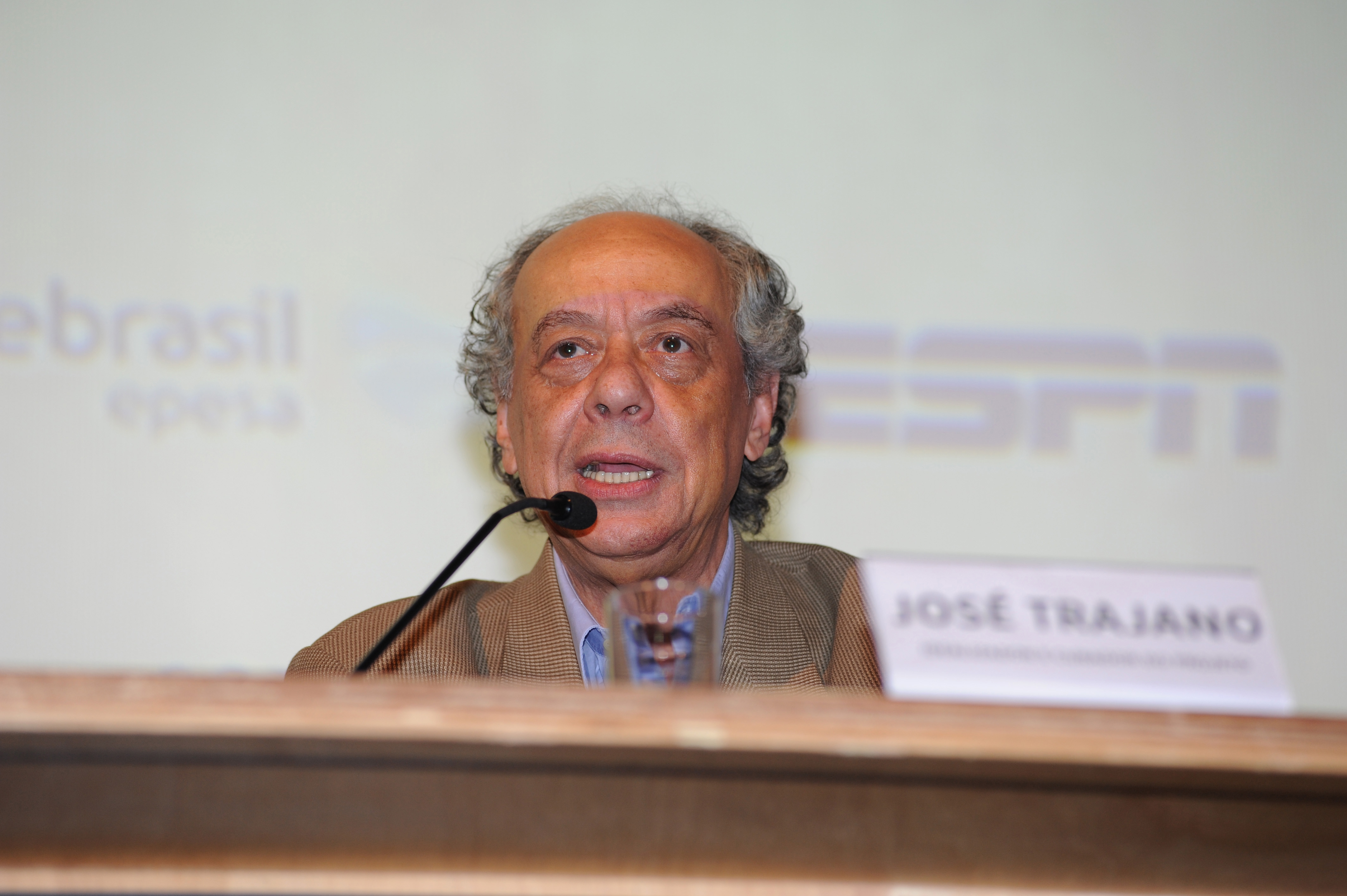
José Trajano in 2013.

He began his career at Jornal do Brasil in 1963, at the age of 16, where he covered the 1970 FIFA World Cup final in Mexico, and has since worked for various media outlets across the country. He held his first management position in 1972 at Jornal dos Sports. During the military dictatorship, he edited an important newspaper from the so-called alternative press,O Ex.

Between 1993 and 2000, he hosted the sports news program Cartão Verde on TV Cultura. In the early 1990s, Julio Bartolo invited him to head Televisão Abril, a sports media company that was a subsidiary of the Grupo Abril. In 1995, the channel was renamed ESPN Brasil. During his time at the station, he appeared on the shows Linha de Passe and Bate-Bola, and was a prominent figure on the former, which he created in 1998. He also appeared on the now-defunct Pontapé Inicial.

On September 30, 2016, he was fired from ESPN Brasil after 21 years with the network. Among other possible reasons for the rift between Trajano and ESPN’s top brass was an incident that occurred in May of that same year, in which Trajano expressed outrage during the opening of Linha de Passe while Danilo Gentili was a guest on Bate-Bola, which later led to the filing of a formal legal complaint against Trajano. Political issues were also cited, as Trajano takes a political stance. He was replaced by João Palomino.

In November 2016, he was hired by Canal Brasil, where he hosted the talk show José Carioca. On May 16, 2024, Trajano returned to ESPN Brasil after nearly eight years to pay tribute to journalist Antero Greco in a special edition of SportsCenter Brasil,a program Antero had hosted for years, dedicated to him.

In December 2016, he launched his YouTube channel, Ultrajano. On the channel, the host presents the show Na Sala do Zé, broadcast from his living room in Vila Madalena, São Paulo. The first episode aired on December 8, 2016, featuring Eduardo Gudin and Pasquale Cipro Neto. In 2017, his original content production expanded to Facebook, Twitter, and his own website, creating his own distribution network. Guests included figures such as Luiz Inácio Lula da Silva, Fernando Haddad, Ciro Gomes, Sâmia Bomfim, Gilberto Gil, Juca Kfouri, Manuela d'Ávila, and Leonardo Sakamoto. On March 20, 2017, the podcast Zé no Rádio premiered on Central3. On January 14, 2019, with the addition of Dudu Monsanto, the show was renamed Pontapé reuniting the duo from their TV days. The podcast released new episodes weekly until January 2022.

In September 2017, he was announced as a new hire at TV dos Trabalhadores, where he hosts the daily show Papo com Zé Trajano, one of the channel’s top-rated programs. In 2021, he joined the cast of Posse de Bola, a podcast and later a television show produced by Universo Online and aired on Canal UOL, in a roundtable format, where he works alongside Juca Kfouri, Arnaldo Ribeiro, Eduardo Tironi, Mauro Cezar Pereira, and Danilo Lavieri.

== Personal life ==
A native of Rio de Janeiro, he is an avowed América Football Club fan. He also became a fan of Arsenal F.C.in England to bond with his son, who was raised in England, and the team became a common topic of conversation between father and son. He was close friends with the soccer player Sócrates, with whom he stayed in Italy and shared many glasses of draft beer.

His first marriage was to fellow journalist Renée Castelo Branco, with whom he had two children, Marina and João, both of whom were raised in England by TV Globo journalist Pedro Bial, since Bial had married Renée shortly thereafter. His second marriage was to fellow journalist Célia Chaim, who passed away in January 2016, with whom he had his youngest son, Pedro.

Trajano is part of the Brazilian left and is an outspoken admirer of the politicians Leonel Brizola and Darcy Ribeiro. In the 2016 Rio de Janeiro mayoral election, he joined the campaign for Marcelo Freixo’s candidacy, volunteering his support without being a member of the Socialism and Liberty Party (PSOL). For TVT, he interviewed Lula alongside Juca Kfouri during Lula’s imprisonment, and Trajano stated that Lula was suffering “political persecution.” In the 2018 Brazilian presidential election, he supported candidate Fernando Haddad (PT). In 2022 election, he endorsed the candidacy of Luiz Inácio Lula da Silva, also of the PT.

== Books ==
A novelist, José Trajano has published the following books:

- Procurando Mônica. São Paulo: Paralela, 2014
- Tijucamérica: Uma chanchada fantasmagórica. Sâo Paulo: Paralela, 2015;
- Os Beneditinos. São Paulo: Companhia das Letras, 2018;
- Aqueles olhos verdes. São Paulo: Companhia das Letras, 2021.

== Prizes ==
Year	Prize	Category	Result	Ref.
2009	Prêmio Comunique-se	Media Executive	Won	
2011	Prêmio Comunique-se	Media Executive	Won	
