= ESPN Caribbean =

- Broadcast area: Caribbean
- Network: ESPN

Programming
- Language: English
- Picture format: 720p HDTV (HD feed downgraded to letterboxed 480i for SDTV sets)

Ownership
- Owner: ESPN, LLC (operated by The Walt Disney Company Latin America through ESPN International)

History
- Launched: 1989 (International); 2007 (Caribbean)

Links
- Website: ESPNCaribbean.com

ESPN Caribbean is the local division of ESPN Inc., that broadcasts in most Caribbean countries (in English). Operated as part of the ESPN International division, the service is composed of ESPN, ESPN2 and ESPN Extra.

== Programming ==
As with its American parent, ESPN offers a selection of events in the world of sport, while also providing a Caribbean focus on sporting events popular in that region. ESPN's Caribbean networks air in 32 countries and territories. Key programming includes America's Cup Yachting, ICC World T20, ICC World Cup and Regional Super 50, La Liga, Italian Serie A, Golf Majors, NFL, NBA, MLB and Grand Slam tennis, as well as popular regionalized studio shows like ESPNFC.

ESPN Caribbean also produces a regional version of ESPN.com, which provide sports news and programming information to Caribbean viewers.

ESPN Caribbean also programs ESPN Play, a specialized broadband network which broadcasts thousands of live games and events online each year. Content features enhanced coverage of events seen on ESPN and ESPN2, as well as some events exclusive to ESPN Play. In addition, ESPN Play also offers an archive of local content including ESPN events and original studio news shows. The service is available through participating service providers as part of the programming tier where ESPN's networks are available, at no additional cost. Sports featured on ESPN Play include Caribbean Regional Super50, ICC World Cup, ICC World T20, MLB, NBA, tennis, golf, among others.

== ESPN Radio ==
ESPN Caribbean is also the regional distributor of ESPN Radio, which is currently heard over two stations: ZSR-FM (103.5) in Nassau, Bahamas (owned by Navetter Broadcasting Company); and KLAS ESPN Sports 89 FM in Jamaica (KLAS Sports Radio Ltd.). ESPN secured agreements with ZSR-FM in 2011 and KLAS in 2013.

== Sport Events ==
Some of the major events seen on ESPN and ESPN2 include:

=== Football ===
- UEFA Women's Champions League
- Premier League
- EFL Championship
- EFL League One
- EFL League Two
- Serie A
- Eredivisie
- Süper Lig
- EFL Cup
- EFL Trophy
- Copa de la Reina de Fútbol
- Supercopa de España Femenina
- Copa Libertadores
- Recopa Sudamericana
- CONCACAF Gold Cup
- CONCACAF W Gold Cup
- CONCACAF W Gold Cup qualification
- CONCACAF W Championship
- CONCACAF W Championship qualification
- CONCACAF Champions Cup
- CONCACAF W Champions Cup
- CONCACAF Central American Cup
- CONCACAF Caribbean Cup
- CONCACAF Under-20 Championship
- CONCACAF Under-17 Championship
- CONCACAF Women's U-20 Championship
- CONCACAF Women's U-17 Championship
- National Women's Soccer League
- USL Championship
- USL Super League
- USL League One
- USL Cup
- Argentine Primera División
- Supercopa Argentina
- Trofeo de Campeones de la Liga Profesional
- AFC Asian Cup
- AFC Women's Asian Cup
- FIFA World Cup qualification (AFC)
- AFC Champions League Elite
- AFC Women's Champions League
- AFC Champions League Two
- AFC U-23 Asian Cup
- AFC U-20 Asian Cup
- AFC U-17 Asian Cup
- AFC U-20 Women's Asian Cup
- AFC U-17 Women's Asian Cup
- AFC Futsal Asian Cup

=== Tennis ===
- Australian Open
- Roland Garros
- Wimbledon
- U.S. Open
- ATP Finals
- ATP 1000
- ATP 500
- ATP 250
- Next Generation ATP Finals
- Laver Cup

=== Badminton ===
- BWF World Tour

=== Basketball ===
- NBA
- WNBA
- NCAA basketball
- NBA Summer League
- NBA G League
- Athletes Unlimited Basketball

=== Baseball ===
- Major League Baseball
- World Baseball Classic
- Little League World Series
- College baseball

=== College Sports ===
- National Collegiate Athletic Association events

=== Cricket ===
- Cricket World Cup
- Women's Cricket World Cup
- ICC World Cup Qualifier
- ICC World Twenty20
- ICC Women's T20 World Cup
- ICC T20 World Cup Qualifier
- ICC Champions Trophy
- ICC Women's Champions Trophy
- ICC World Test Championship Final
- Under 19 Cricket World Cup
- Under-19 Women's T20 World Cup
- West Indies team home matches (Men and Women)
- Super50 Cup
- Women's Super50 Cup
- Major League Cricket

=== Cycling ===
- Tour de France
- Tour de France Femmes
- Vuelta a España
- La Vuelta Femenina
- Tour Down Under
- Paris–Nice
- Critérium du Dauphiné
- Tour of Armenia
- Volta Ciclista a Catalunya Femenina
- Tour of Flanders
- Paris–Roubaix
- Liège–Bastogne–Liège
- Omloop Het Nieuwsblad
- Gent–Wevelgem
- Dwars door Vlaanderen
- Amstel Gold Race
- La Flèche Wallonne
- Scheldeprijs
- Brabantse Pijl
- Brussels Cycling Classic
- Paris–Tours

=== Darts ===
- PDC World Darts Championship
- World Matchplay
- Grand Slam of Darts
- World Grand Prix

=== Golf ===
- The Masters
- PGA Championship
- U.S. Open
- The Open Championship
- PGA Tour
- PGA European Tour
- President's Cup
- Ryder Cup
- U.S. Women's Open
- U.S. Senior Open
- U.S. Senior Women's Open
- Women's British Open
- Senior Open
- Senior PGA Championship
- Walker Cup
- Curtis Cup
- Augusta National Women's Amateur
- The Amateur Championship
- The Women's Amateur Championship
- U.S. Amateur
- U.S. Women's Amateur
- U.S. Junior Amateur Golf Championship
- U.S. Girls' Junior Championship
- U.S. Adaptive Open
- Latin America Amateur Championship
- Asia-Pacific Amateur Championship
- Women's Asia-Pacific Amateur Championship

=== Gridiron Football ===
- National Football League
- Liga de Fútbol Americano Profesional
- College Football

=== Horse Racing ===
- Kentucky Derby
- Preakness Stakes
- Belmont Stakes
- Pegasus World Cup
- Saudi Cup
- Dubai World Cup
- Grand National
- Epsom Derby
- Prix de Diane
- Royal Ascot
- Eclipse Stakes
- Haskell Stakes
- King George VI and Queen Elizabeth Stakes
- Glorious Goodwood
- Whitney Stakes
- Fourstardave Handicap
- International Stakes
- Kentucky Turf Cup
- Kentucky Downs Turf Sprint Stakes
- Irish Champion Stakes
- Woodbine Mile
- Coolmore Turf Mile Stakes
- Prix de l'Arc de Triomphe
- Spinster Stakes
- British Champions Day
- Breeders' Cup
- Melbourne Cup
- Bahrain International
- Hong Kong International Races

=== Ice Hockey ===
- NHL

=== Marathon ===
- Tokyo Marathon
- New York City Half Marathon
- Rotterdam Marathon
- Boston Marathon
- London Marathon
- Madrid Marathon
- Prague Marathon
- Stockholm Marathon
- Sydney Marathon
- Berlin Marathon
- Frankfurt Marathon
- New York City Marathon
- Valencia Marathon

=== Mixed Martial Arts ===
- Legacy Fighting Alliance

=== Motor Sports ===
- Formula One
- FIA Formula 2 Championship
- FIA Formula 3 Championship
- F1 Academy
- MotoGP
- Moto2
- Moto3
- FIM Women's Motorcycling World Championship
- Superbike World Championship
- Supersport World Championship
- Sportbike World Championship
- Red Bull MotoGP Rookies Cup
- Asia Talent Cup
- Harley-Davidson Bagger World Cup
- Porsche Supercup
- AMA Supersport Championship

=== Multi-sport events ===
- Special Olympics World Games

=== Padel ===
- Hexagon Cup

=== Poker ===
- World Series of Poker

=== Rugby ===
- Rugby World Cup
- Women's Rugby World Cup
- Nations Championship
- Nations Cup
- Six Nations Championship
- The Rugby Championship
- World Rugby Pacific Nations Cup
- Super Rugby
- Super Rugby Americas
- Currie Cup
- National Provincial Championship
- WXV Global Series
- Women's Six Nations Championship
- Super Rugby Aupiki
- Farah Palmer Cup
- World Rugby Under 20 Championship
- World Rugby Under 20 Challenger Cup
- Six Nations Under 20s Championship
- Under 20s Rugby Championship
- Test matches

=== Skiing ===
- FIS Alpine World Ski Championships
- FIS Nordic World Ski Championships
- FIS Snowboard World Championships
- FIS Alpine Ski World Cup
- FIS Cross-Country World Cup
- FIS Freestyle Ski World Cup
- FIS Nordic Combined World Cup
- FIS Ski Jumping World Cup
- FIS Snowboard World Cup

=== Triathlon ===
- Ironman World Championship
- Ironman Pro Series

=== Volleyball ===
- Women's European Volleyball Championship
- Men's European Volleyball Championship
- LOVB Pro
- Athletes Unlimited Volleyball

=== Weightlifting ===
- World Weightlifting Championships

=== Yachting ===
- America's Cup
- America's Cup Qualifiers and Challenger Playoffs
- America's Cup World Series
- Women's America's Cup
- Youth America's Cup
