= Paulo Soares =

Paulo Soares may refer to:

- Paulo Soares (footballer) (born 1999), Cape Verde international footballer
- Paulo Soares (journalist) (1962–2025), Brazilian journalist
