= 2026 Oceania Rugby Women's Championship =

Women's rugby union tournament

Tournament details
- Host: Fiji
- Date: 17–25 April 2026
- Countries: Fiji; Samoa; Tonga

Final positions
- Champions: Fiji (6th title)
- Runner-up: Samoa

Tournament statistics
- Matches played: 3
- Tries scored: 33 (11 per match)

The 2026 Oceania Rugby Women's Championship was the eighth edition of the tournament and took place at Churchill Park in Lautoka and Govind Park in Ba (Fiji) from 17 to 25 April 2026. Fiji, Samoa and Tonga competed in the 2026 tournament.

Fiji retained their title after a 60–7 victory over Samoa.

== Table ==
Pos	Team	Pld	W	D	L	PF	PA	PD	TF	TA	TB	LB	Pts	FIJ	SAM	TON
1	Fiji	2	2	0	0	143	12	+131	22	2	2	0	10	—		
2	Samoa	2	1	0	1	57	65	−8	9	10	1	0	5	7–60	—	
3	Tonga	2	0	0	2	10	133	−123	2	21	0	0	0	5–83	5–50	—

Updated to match(es) played on 25 April 2026. Source:
Legend: Blue = home team win; Yellow = draw; Red = away team win.

== Fixtures ==
The full schedule for the tournament was announced on 10 March 2026 by Oceania Rugby. All three games will be played in Fiji.

=== Round 1 ===
17 April 2026
16:30 FJT (UTC+12)

Tonga	5–83	Fiji
Try: Vika Fifita 17' m Con: 'Ofa Napa'a Latu (0/1)	Report	Try: Aqela Raitubu (2) 5' c, 27' c Sulita Waisega 8' m Charlotte Tuicikobia 11' m Vika Nakacia 14' c Merewairita Neivoha 21' c Adi Salaseini Railumu 22' c Karalaini Naisewa 47' c Keleni Marawa 49' c Varanisese Qoro 51' c Ivamere Rokowati (2) 55' m, 62' m Repeka Tove 74' c Con: Ivamere Rokowati (1/3) 6'; Varanisese Qoro (8/10) 15', 22', 23', 28', 48', 50', 52', 75'

Churchill Park, Lautoka
Referee: Erin Doherty (New Zealand)

Team details

LP	1	Vika Fifita
HK	2	Jennifer Vea
TP	3	Fusipala Vivili
LL	4	Vinora Televave	(yellow card) 31'
RL	5	'Eseta Vuki
BF	6	Haufa Halapio
OF	7	Courtney Afeaki
N8	8	Pritney Tuiaki (c)
SH	9	'Ana Ngahe
FH	10	Tonga Tuiaki	(yellow card) 10'
LW	11	Salome Cook
IC	12	Siutiti Ma'ake
OC	13	Salome 'Akolo
RW	14	Allison Elone
FB	15	'Ofa Napa'a Latu
Replacements:
HK	16	Vola 'Ulutaufonua
PR	17	Pelenaise Sandys
PR	18	Lavenita Manase
LK	19	Senitila Tatafu
BR	20	Palolo Fotu
SH	21	Aso Leapai
FH	22	Felila Kolotau
WG	23	Enisolo Fa
Coach:
(Tonga) Fili Sau

LP	1	Karalaini Naisewa
HK	2	Keleni Marawa
TP	3	Adi Keri Lawavou
LL	4	Karavaki Lutumaibau
RL	5	Carletta Yee
BF	6	Adi Salaseini Railumu
OF	7	Alfreda Fisher (c)
N8	8	Sulita Waisega
SH	9	Evivi Senikarivi
FH	10	Varanisese Qoro
LW	11	Aqela Raitubu
IC	12	Merewairita Neivoha
OC	13	Vika Nakacia
RW	14	Charlotte Tuicikobia
FB	15	Ivamere Rokowati
Replacements:
LK	16	Litia Marama
PR	17	Tiana Robanakadavu
PR	18	Elesi Rotabaiwalu
LK	19	Vilisi Tivalele
FL	20	Charlotte Vosakiwaiwai
SH	21	Kolora Lomani
FH	22	Vaiseva Cavuru
WG	23	Repeka Tove
Coach:
(Fiji) Mike Legge

Assistant referees:
Meresiana Savenaca (Fiji)
Poto Brown (Samoa)

=== Round 2 ===
21 April 2026
16:30 FJT (UTC+12)

Tonga	5–50	Samoa
Try: Vika Fifita 21' m Con: Luseane Vivili (0/1)	Report	Try: Maria Eirenei Nikolao 14' m Faith Nonutunu (2) 33' m, 45' c Tyra Boysen-Auimatagi 41' m Iron Talia 52' c Harmony Vatau 62' c Taytana Pati Ah-Cheung 68' m Octavia Nanai Iafeta 72' c Con: Harmony Vatau (2/5) 42', 46'; Iron Talia (3/3) 53', 63', 73'

Churchill Park, Lautoka
Referee: Meresiana Savenaca (Fiji)

Team details

LP	1	Vika Fifita
HK	2	Pelenaise Sandys
TP	3	Luseane Vivili
LL	4	Palolo Fotu
RL	5	'Eseta Vuki
BF	6	Haufa Halapio
OF	7	Courtney Afeaki
N8	8	Pritney Tuiaki (c)
SH	9	'Ana Ngahe
FH	10	Tonga Tuiaki
LW	11	Salome 'Akolo
IC	12	Siutiti Ma'ake
OC	13	Mele Kei
RW	14	Allison Elone
FB	15	'Ofa Napa'a Latu
Replacements:
HK	16	Vola 'Ulutaufonua
PR	17	Kelesi Huhane
PR	18	Lavenita Manase
LK	19	Senitila Tatafu	(yellow card) 61'
BR	20	'Ofa Tuionetoa
SH	21	Avea Leapai
FH	22	Felila Kolotau
WG	23	Lepeka Moimoi
Coach:
(Tonga) Fili Sau

LP	1	Octavia Nanai Iafeta	(yellow card) 75'
HK	2	Faith Nonutunu
TP	3	Maria Eirenei Nikolao
LL	4	Ana-Lise Sio
RL	5	Jorja Fruean
BF	6	Utumalama Atonio (cc)
OF	7	Michelle Ame Curry
N8	8	Nina Foaese
SH	9	Janell Fereti Faanana
FH	10	Harmony Vatau
LW	11	Tyra Boysen-Auimatagi
IC	12	Iron Talia
OC	13	Drenna Falaniko
RW	14	Linda Fiafia
FB	15	Taytana Pati Ah-Cheung
Replacements:
LK	16	Clementine Utumapu
PR	17	Tisera Volkman
PR	18	Latoya Taheela Mariner
LK	19	Marilyn-Rose Ripine Pauaraisa
FL	20	Faaaloalo Christina Luafitu
SH	21	Sui Tauaua-Pauaraisa (cc)
FH	22	Leutu Iefata Suaesi
WG	23	Siluando Lafai
Coach:
(Australia) Silei Etuale

Assistant referees:
Poto Brown (Samoa)
Marita Saafi (Tonga)

=== Round 3 ===
25 April 2026
15:30 FJT (UTC+12)

Samoa	7–60	Fiji
Try: Machiko Fepulea'i 55' c Con: Harmony Vatau (1/1) 56'		Try: Manuqalo Komaitai (2) 9' c, 72' c Merewairita Neivoha 12' m Tiana Robanakadavu 33' c Aqela Raitubu (3) 40' m, 41' c, 70' m Vika Nakacia 46' c Sulita Waisega 66' c Con: Litiana Vueti (6/9) 10', 34', 41', 47', 67', 73'; Pen: Litiana Vueti (1/1) 18'

Govind Park, Ba
Referee: Erin Doherty (New Zealand)

Team details

LP	1	Octavia Nanai Iafeta
HK	2	Clementine Utumapu
TP	3	Ana Mamea
LL	4	Ana-Lise Sio
RL	5	Machiko Fepulea'i
BF	6	Utumalama Atonio (cc)
OF	7	Michelle Ame Curry
N8	8	Nina Foaese
SH	9	Ana Afuie
FH	10	Harmony Vatau
LW	11	Tyra Boysen-Auimatagi
IC	12	Iron Talia
OC	13	Drenna Falaniko
RW	14	Linda Fiafia
FB	15	Taytana Pati Ah-Cheung
Replacements:
HK	16	Faith Nonutunu
PR	17	Celeste Utumapu
PR	18	Tisera Volkman
LK	19	Jorja Fruean
BR	20	Faaaloalo Christina Luafitu
SH	21	Sui Tauaua-Pauaraisa (cc)
FH	22	Leutu Iefata Suaesi
WG	23	Memphis Pati Ah-Cheung
Coach:
(Australia) Silei Etuale

LP	1	Karalaini Naisewa
HK	2	Keleni Marawa
TP	3	Tiana Robanakadavu	(yellow card) 49'
LL	4	Karavaki Lutumaibau
RL	5	Carletta Yee
BF	6	Sulita Waisega
OF	7	Alfreda Fisher (c)
N8	8	Manuqalo Komaitai
SH	9	Kolora Lomani
FH	10	Salanieta Kinita
LW	11	Aqela Raitubu
IC	12	Ivamere Rokowati
OC	13	Merewairita Neivoha
RW	14	Kelera Roqorua
FB	15	Litiana Vueti
Replacements:
LK	16	Litia Marama
PR	17	Zipporah Sorokacika
PR	18	Adi Keri LawavouElesi Rotabaiwalu
LK	19	Vilisi Tivalele
FL	20	Adi Salaseini Railumu
SH	21	Evivi Senikarivi
FH	22	Vika Nakacia
WG	23	Charlotte Tuicikobia
Coach:
(Fiji) Mike Legge

Assistant referees:
Meresiana Savenaca (Fiji)
Marita Saafi (Tonga)
