= WXV Global Series Challenger =

Women's rugby union tournament for emerging national teams

- Upcoming season or competition: 2026 WXV Global Series Challenger
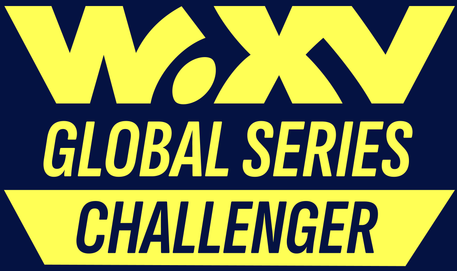
- Sport: Rugby union
- Founded: 2025; 1 year ago
- First season: 2026; 0 years ago
- No. of teams: 6
- Countries: Brazil; Fiji; Hong Kong China; Netherlands; Samoa; Spain
- Website: wxvrugby.com

WXV Global Series Challenger is an international women's rugby union tournament contested by six emerging national teams. It is one of two successors to WXV, alongside the WXV Global Series, and was announced in September 2025. The Challenger is staged at a single centrally hosted venue and funded by World Rugby.

The competition is held in 2026 and 2028. The 2028 edition will serve as the Final Qualification Tournament (FQT) for the 2029 Women's Rugby World Cup, with the top-placed team that has not already qualified earning the final berth.

== Overview ==
The WXV Global Series Challenger is the secondary competition within the WXV Global Series structure, designed to provide emerging nations with more consistent, high-quality international fixtures. Unlike the home-and-away tours of the top 12 nations, the Challenger is centrally hosted at a single venue and fully funded by World Rugby, addressing the financial challenges faced by smaller unions.

The rankings used to determine positions were set at the conclusion of 2024 WXV, and all six teams remain fixed throughout the 2026–2028 cycle. Across both the Challenger and the WXV Global Series, 16 of the 18 participating nations competed at the 2025 Women's Rugby World Cup, they are joined by Hong Kong China and the Netherlands who are included through the ranking-based selection process.

== Teams ==
The six teams fixed for the 2026–2028 cycle are: Brazil, Fiji, Hong Kong China, the Netherlands, Samoa, and Spain.

== Format ==
The tournament features six teams in two pools of three, using the same cross-pool format as the previous WXV system, in which each team plays matches against the three teams in the other pool. In 2026, matches are held over three triple-header days, with three fixtures per day.

== Hosts and editions ==
=== 2026 ===
The inaugural WXV Global Series Challenger is being held at Kai Tak Sports Park in Hong Kong from 13 to 26 September 2026, with triple-header matchdays on 13, 19 and 26 September played in the Youth Sports Ground. All six teams are in residence for the full duration of the event.

=== 2028 ===
The 2028 edition will serve as the Final Qualification Tournament for the 2029 Women's Rugby World Cup, with the top-placed team that has not already qualified for the World Cup earning the final berth. The host city and venue for 2028 are to be confirmed by World Rugby.

== Results ==
Ed.	Year	Host	Champion	Runner-up	3rd	4th	5th	6th
1	2026	Hong Kong	Fiji	Netherlands	Spain	Hong Kong China	Brazil	Samoa
2	2028	TBC						

== See also ==
- World Rugby Nations Cup (2026–)
