= Juca Kfouri =

Brazilian sports journalist

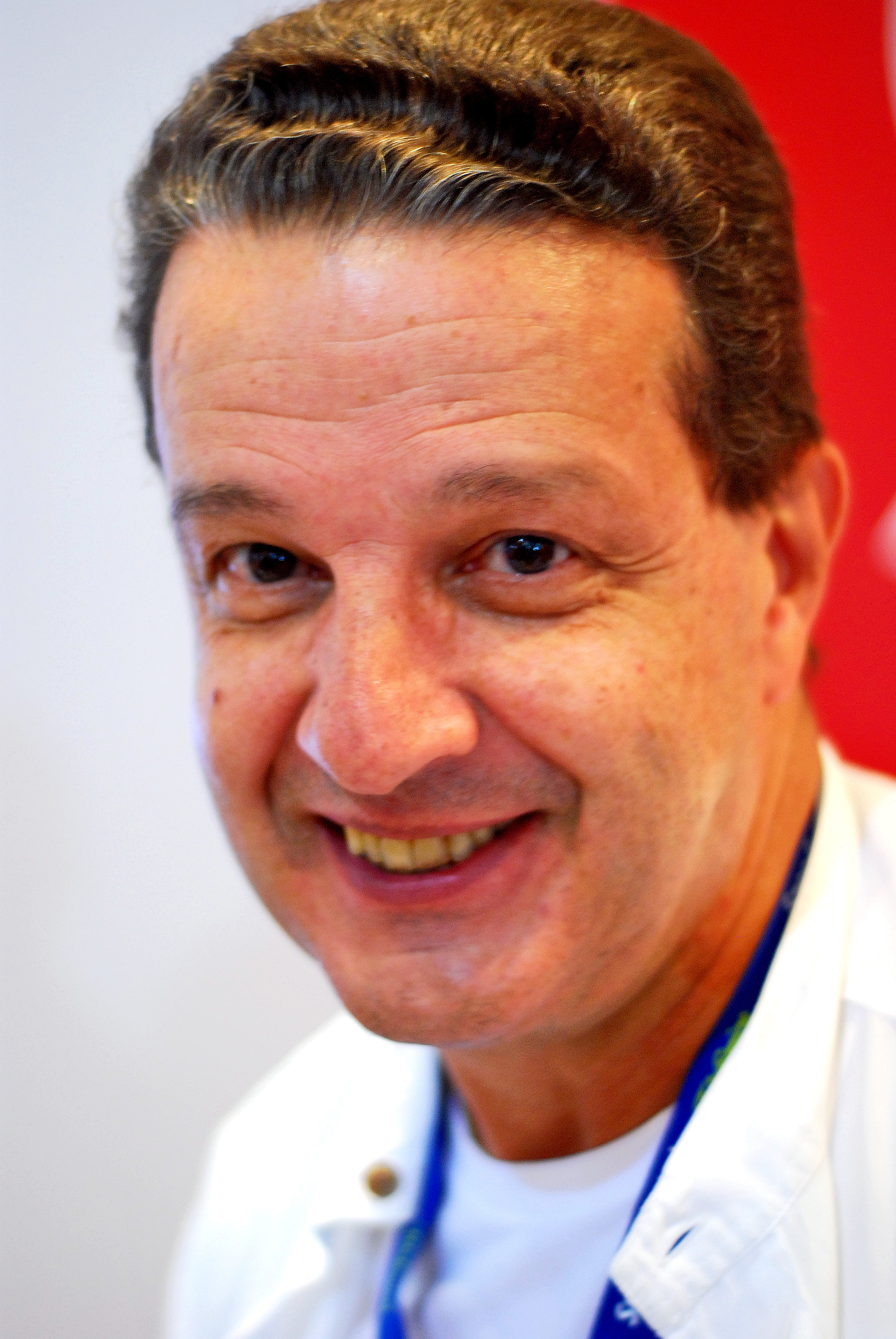
- Juca Kfouri at the 2008 Campus Party Brasil
- Born: José Carlos Amaral Kfouri; March 4, 1950 (age 76); São Paulo, São Paulo
- Education: University of São Paulo
- Occupations: Journalist and TV presenter
- Spouse: Leda Cristina Orosco (married 1977–present)
- Children: 4

José Carlos Amaral Kfouri, more commonly known as Juca Kfouri, (São Paulo, 4 March 1950) is a Brazilian sports journalist.

== Career ==
A descendant of Lebanese immigrants, Juca Kfouri studied Social Sciences at the Faculty of Philosophy, Languages and Human Sciences of the University of São Paulo and was invited to work on the Department of Documentation (DEDOC) of Editora Abril, in 1970. There, he rose to the position of director until 1974, when he was invited to be the chief of reporting at Placar magazine. He stayed there until 1978, when he worked for three months at TV Tupi. Due to delayed salaries, he quit and on the next day he was invited by Jairo Régis to be a special project editor.

In 1982, he gained notability for exposing the a scandal related to the Sports Lottery, which generated several lawsuits against him.

=== Works on television ===
In January 2018, he was hired by TVT to present the interview show Entre Vistas. On 14 August 2019, ESPN Brasil fired Kfouri and many others as part of a restructuring process. In 2024, he guest appeared on ESPN Brasil during a tribute to journalist Antero Greco at the program he used to present, SportsCenter Brasil.

=== Newspapers and internet ===
When he worked at Lance!, he was sued by coach Vanderlei Luxemburgo and ordered to pay him a compensation.

Since May 2022, he works as a pundit at the independent channel ICL Notícias, on YouTube.

=== Controversies ===
On 9 August 2021, during episode 150 of the podcast Posse de Bola at UOL, Juca Kfouri criticized the Brazilian male football players after they won the gold medal at the Tokyo 2020 Olympic Games because they refused to wear the jacket provided by the Brazilian Olympic Committee during the medal ceremony. He called their attitude "scoundrel" and saw it as a display of disregard for fellow athletes from other sports.

On 9 April 2022, in a post-game essay on his blog at UOL, Kfouri called Santos FC "Ninguém FC" (Nobody FC) when analyzing its match against Fluminense FC, which was poorly received by the club and its supporters; Santos announced it would cease communication with all UOL journalists until Kfouri apologized, which he refused to do. About a month later, Santos lifted the ban after concluding that the opinion was exclusive to Kfouri.

=== Radio ===
In 2000, he became a presenter of the program CBN Esporte Clube, which lasted until 2010. Since then, he continued at CBN, but was eventually fired on 7 November 2023 among many other professionals of the station and related companies.

== Personal life ==
Kfouri has been married to Leda Cristina Orosco since 1977 and has four children, including André Kfouri, a reporter at ESPN Brasil, and Daniel Kfouri, a freelance photographer.

His aunt was Nadir Kfouri, rector of PUC-SP between 1976 and 1984 who became notable for publicly refusing to shake São Paulo State Secretary of Public Security Erasmo Dias's hand, calling him a murderer. Kfouri is also the brother of journalist and musicologist Maria Luiza Kfouri. In order to describe his experiences as a grandfather, he kept a column called "Vovô Juca" ("Grandpa Juca") on the Pais&Filhos magazine between 2013 and 2014.

== Awards ==
Year	Award	Category	Outcome	Ref.
1996	Troféu ACEESP (Associação dos Cronistas Esportivos do Estado de São Paulo)	Newspaper/Magazine	Won	
2004	Prêmio Comunique-se	Sports: Written Media	Won	
2004	Prêmio Comunique-se	Sports: Spoken Media	Won	
2006	Prêmio Comunique-se	Sports: Written Media	Won	
2008	Troféu ACEESP (Associação dos Cronistas Esportivos do Estado de São Paulo)	Newspaper Columnist	Won	
2009	Troféu ACEESP (Associação dos Cronistas Esportivos do Estado de São Paulo)	Newspaper Columnist	Won	
2009	Prêmio Comunique-se	Sports: Written Media	Won	
2010	Troféu ACEESP (Associação dos Cronistas Esportivos do Estado de São Paulo)	Newspaper Columnist	Won	
2011	Troféu ACEESP (Associação dos Cronistas Esportivos do Estado de São Paulo)	Newspaper Columnist	Won	
2011	Troféu ACEESP (Associação dos Cronistas Esportivos do Estado de São Paulo)	Sports Blog	Won	
2012	Troféu ACEESP (Associação dos Cronistas Esportivos do Estado de São Paulo)	Newspaper Columnist	Won	
2012	Troféu ACEESP (Associação dos Cronistas Esportivos do Estado de São Paulo)	Sports Blog	Won	
2012	Prêmio Comunique-se	Sports: Written Media	Won	
2013	Troféu ACEESP (Associação dos Cronistas Esportivos do Estado de São Paulo)	Newspaper Columnist	Won	
2013	Troféu ACEESP (Associação dos Cronistas Esportivos do Estado de São Paulo)	Sports Blog	Won	
2014	Prêmio Comunique-se	Sports: Written Media	Won	
2021	Prêmio Comunique-se	Sports: Written Media	Nominated	
