= Colégio de São Bento =

- Colégio de São Bento do Rio de Janeiro
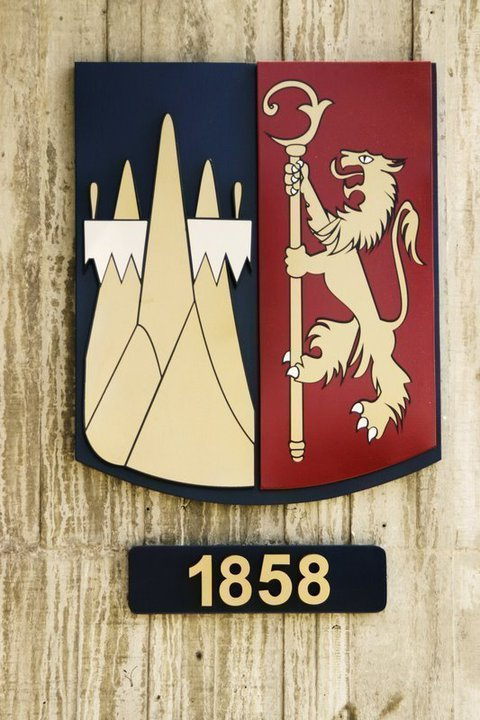
- O Melhor Colégio do Brasil (The Best School of Brazil)

Location
- Rua Dom Gerardo, 68; Rio de Janeiro, Rio de Janeiro; Brazil; 22.89774°S 43.179711°W

Information
- Type: Private All-male
- Motto: Ora et Labora (Pray and Labor)
- Established: February 9, 1858
- Founder: Abade Frei Luís da Conceição Saraiva OSB
- School district: Centro (city centre)
- Rector: Dom Miguel Da Silva Vieira OSB (2010 - now)
- Grades: 1-12
- Colours: Red, Blue and Yellow
- Mascot: Lion
- National ranking: 1st
- ENEM average: 761.7 (2011) - Highest Score in the Country
- Newspaper: http://www.csbrj.org.br/jornal/
- Religion: Roman Catholic

Colégio de São Bento is a Benedictine school for boys in Rio de Janeiro, Brazil with a history that dates back more than 150 years. It was founded in 1858 on the hills overlooking Rio de Janeiro's harbor and the Guanabara Bay, by the adjacent Benedictine monastery (Portuguese: Mosteiro de São Bento). Although the school is still run by the monastery, students who attend it may come from any denomination or religion.

All students follow a broad course of study, which includes Theology, Music, Algebra, Geometry, Physics, Chemistry, Biology, Classical Culture, Brazilian and Portuguese Literature, Geography, History, Portuguese, Spanish, French, and English languages, Philosophy, Sociology, as well the History of Music, Architecture and Fine Arts, among other subjects.

The school has been consistently rated the best Brazilian high school by ENEM (National High School Assessment Test), showing the highest ranking of college admissions in the country. Its graduates, who refer to themselves as Benedictines include Brazilian leaders from government and business, renowned doctors, educators, poets, musicians and writers.

== National High School Exam ==
In the years 2005, 2007, and 2010, it ranked first nationally in the National High School Exam (ENEM), and in the years 2009 and 2011, it held first place at the state level. In 2012, the school achieved 1st place in writing and 4th in objective questions nationwide, once again ranking 1st in the state. These strong results have earned the institution the reputation of being the best school in Brazil. In 2014, the school once again reached first place in the national ranking.

== Coat of Arms ==
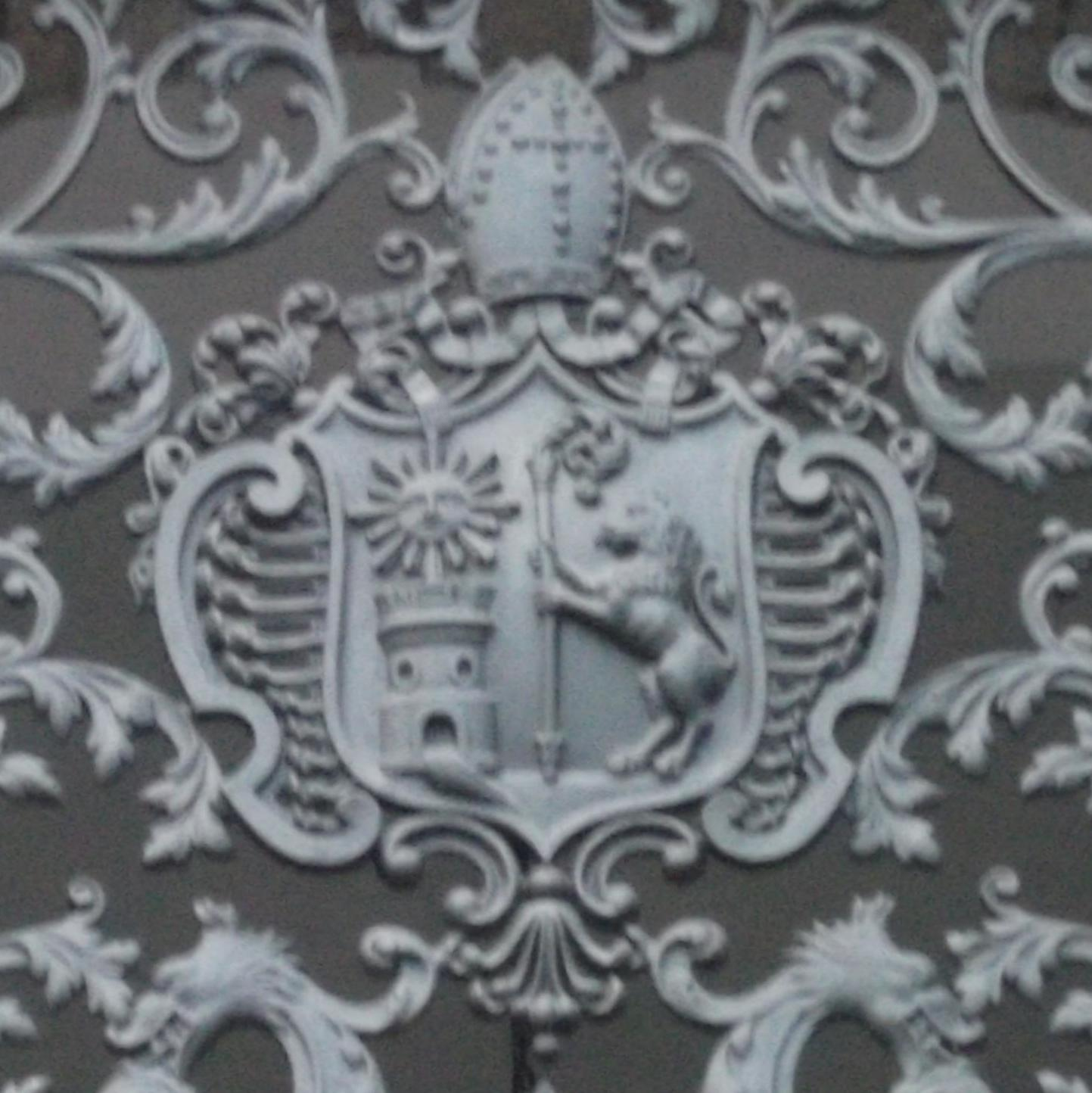
Coat of Arms of the Abbey

The coat of arms of the Colégio de São Bento in Rio de Janeiro is derived from the Abbey's coat of arms. It features two main elements: the serrated mountain, which alludes to the Catalan sanctuary of Montserrat, where the Most Holy Virgin Mother of God is venerated; and the lion with the crosier, symbolizing the virtues of courage, bravery, and magnanimity, which were associated in the Middle Ages with the Order of Saint Benedict. The crosier also refers to abbatial authority, with its pastoral office.

== Honors and awards ==
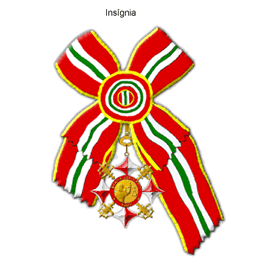
Order of Judicial Merit of the Federal District and the Territories (OMJDFT)

On March 29, 2010, the Colégio de São Bento was awarded the Insignia of the Order of Judicial Merit of the Federal District and the Territories — the highest honorary distinction granted by the Court of Justice of the Federal District and the Territories — in recognition of its outstanding services to legal culture in general, as well as to the Judiciary of the Federal District and the Territories. It was the first educational institution to receive such an award.

== Rectors (until 1903, Directors) ==
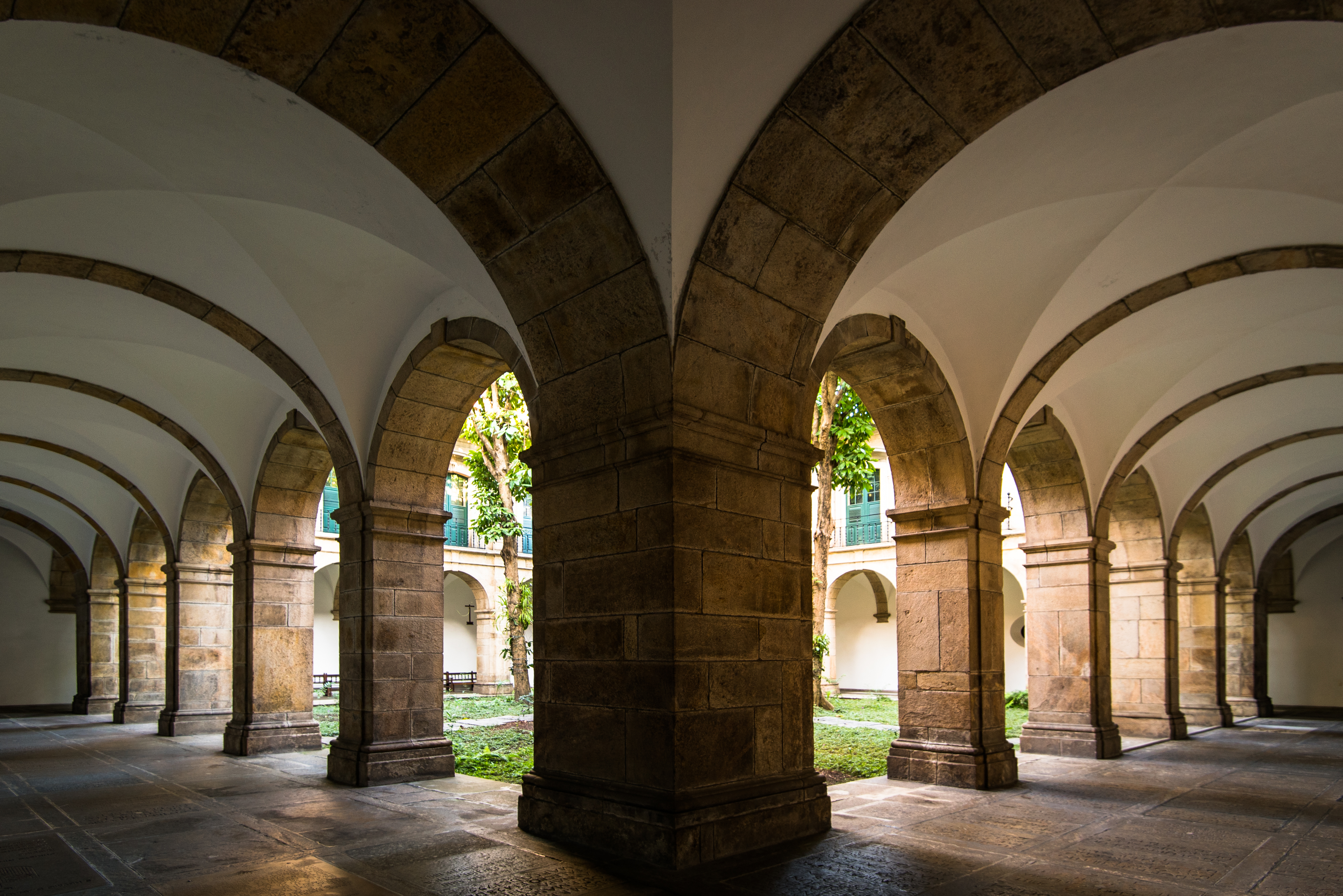
The monastery's internal courtyard, where most of the rectors where buried

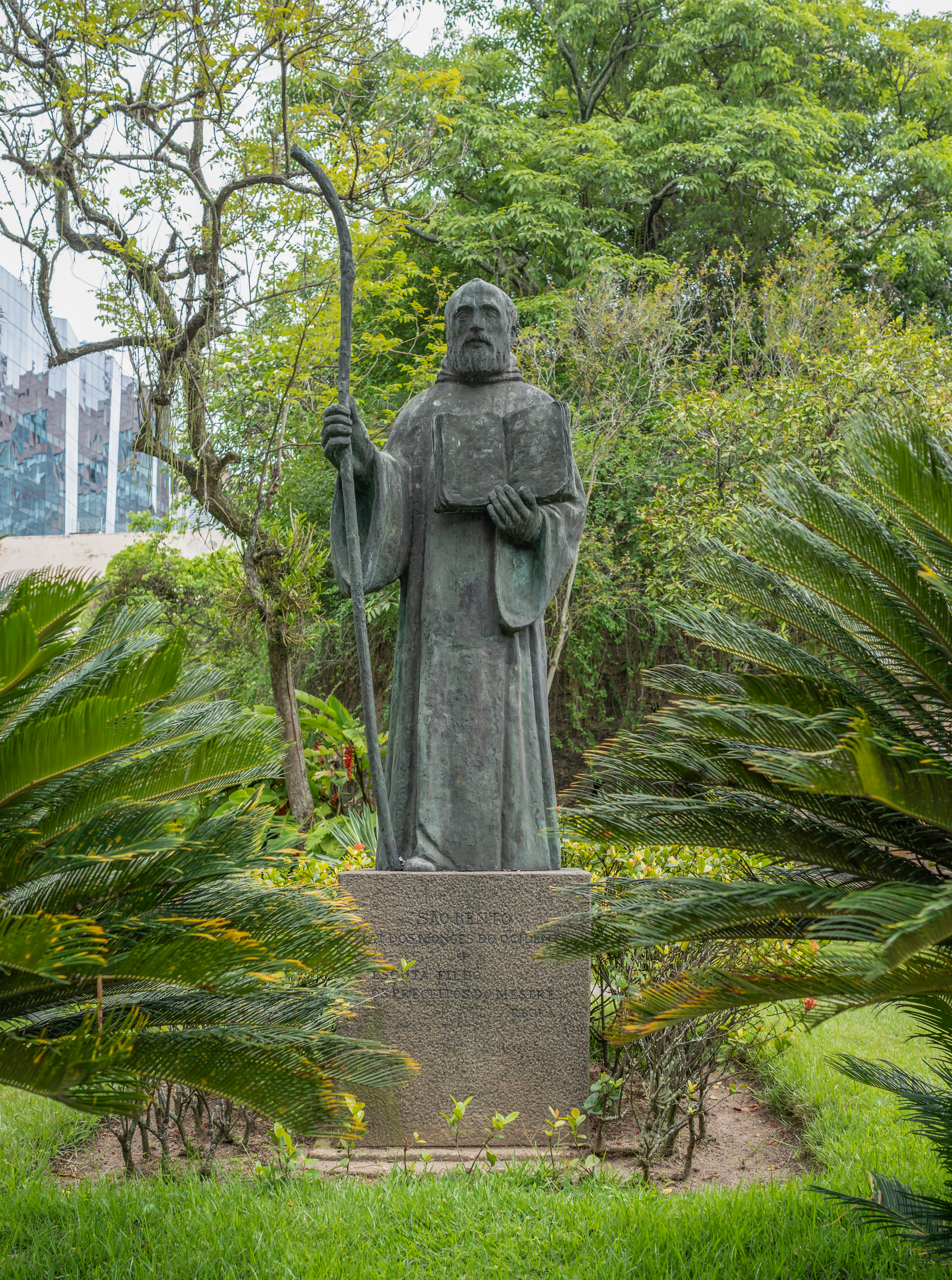
Statue of Saint Benedict at the entry of the Abbey

- Abbot Friar Luís da Conceição Saraiva (founder), 1858 - 1860
- President Friar Antônio de Santa Águeda Carneiro, 1860
- Abbot Friar Saturnino de Santa Clara Antunes de Abreu, 1860 - 1863
- Abbot Friar José da Purificação Franco, 1863 - 1872
- Abbot Friar Manoel de São Caetano Pinto, 1872 - 1881
- Abbot Friar José da Purificação Franco, 1881 - 1884
- Abbot Friar Manoel de Santa Catarina Furtado, 1884 - 1893
- Abbot Friar João das Mercês Ramos, 1893 - 1903
- Dom Marcos Stoker, 1903
- Dom Pio Alpen, 1904 - 1905
- Dom Amaro van Emelen, 1905 - 1906
- Dom Ambrósio Winckier, 1907 - 1908
- Abbot Coadjutor Dom João Crisóstomo De Saegher, 1908
- Dom Amaro van Emelen, 1909 - 1910
- Dom Ildefonso Deigendesch, 1910
- Dom João Evangelista Barbosa, 1911 - 1913
- Dom Ildefonso Deigendesch, 1914 - 1915
- Abbot Dom Pedro Eggerath, 1915 - 1916
- Dom Leandro Marques de Souza, 1917 - 1918
- Dom Meinrado Mattmann, 1918 - 1936
- Abbot Dom Tomás Keller, 1936
- Dom Vicente de Oliveira, 1936 - 1937
- Dom Bonifácio Plum, 1937 - 1941
- Dom Hildebrando Petrola Martins, 1942 - 1946
- Dom Basílio Penido, 1947 - 1954
- Dom Lourenço de Almeida Prado, 1955 - 2001
- Dom Matias Fonseca de Medeiros, 2001 - 2003
- Dom Tadeu de Albuquerque Lopes, 2003 - 2010
- Dom Miguel da Silva Vieira, 2010 - 2014
- Abbot Dom Felipe da Silva, 2014–Present

== Notable alumni ==
Benjamin Constant, the Father of the Republic.

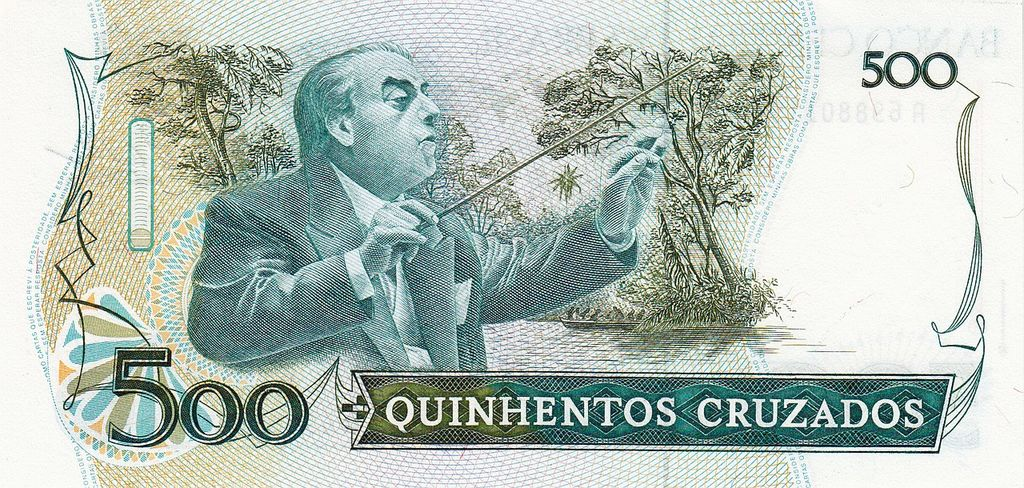
Heitor Villa-Lobos, maestro and musician, featured on the 500 Cruzados banknote

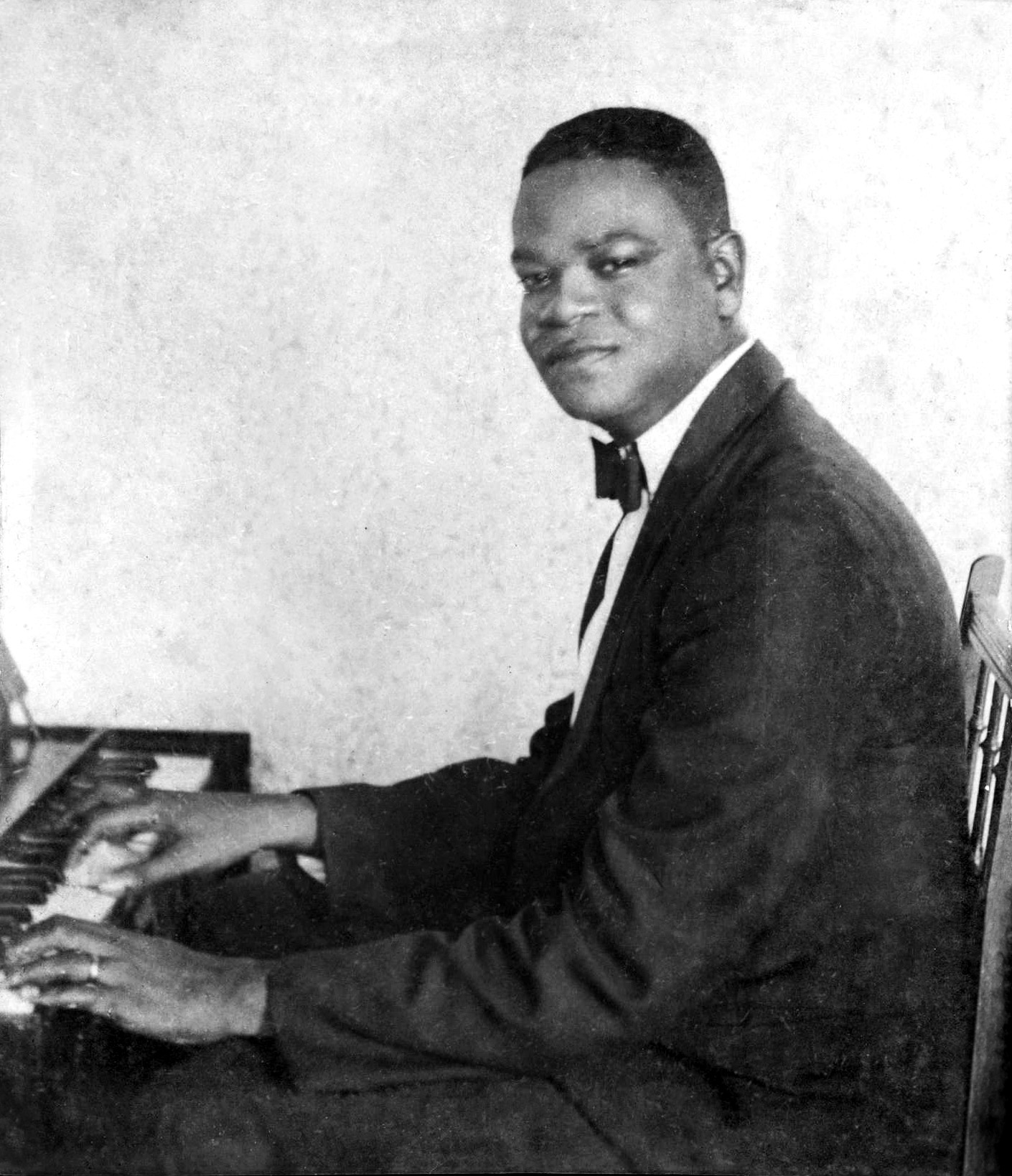
Pixinguinha, Brazilian musician

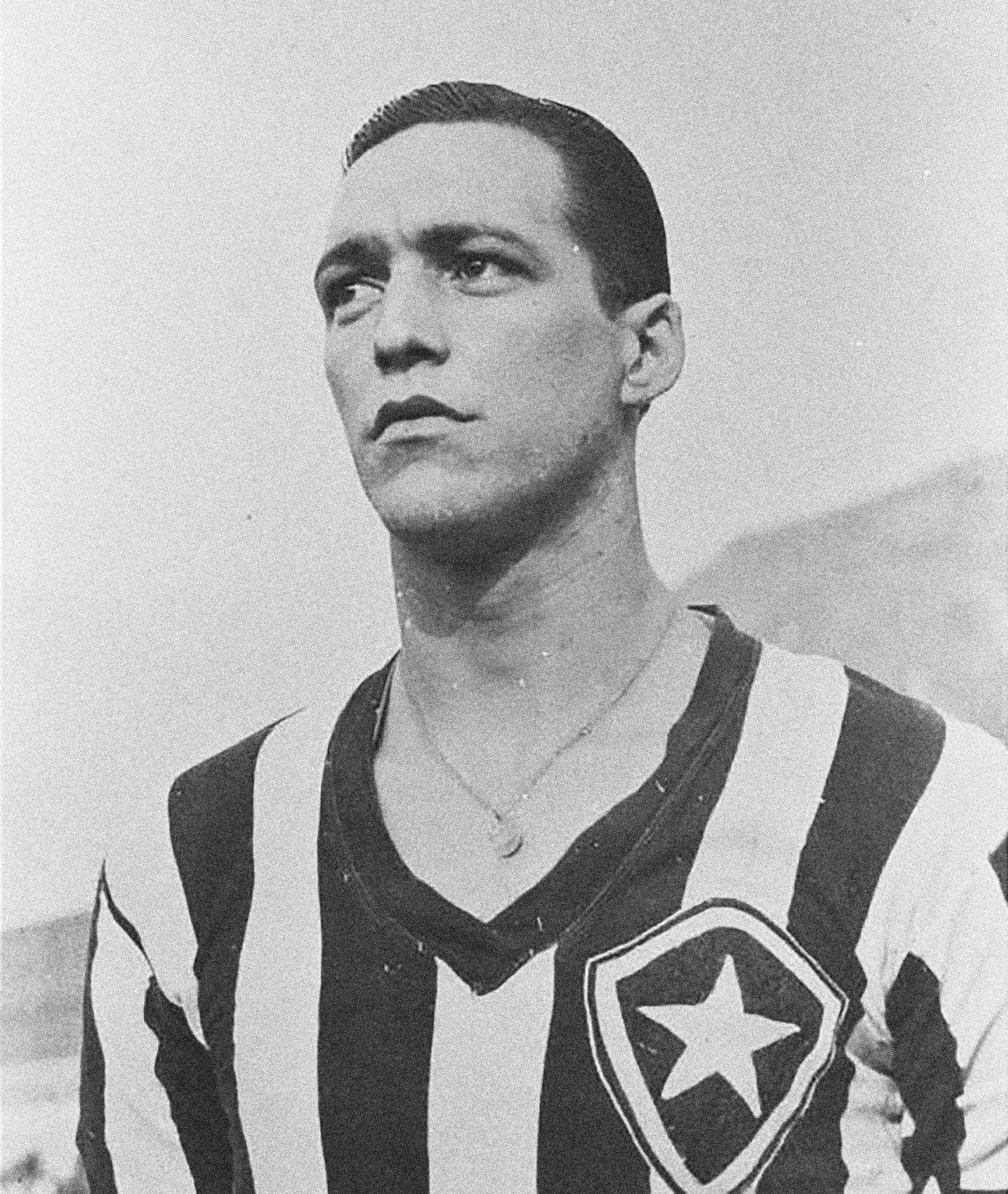
Heleno de Freitas, football player and Botafogo idol

- Alfredo da Rocha Vianna Jr. (Pixinguinha), composer and musician
- Anselmo Vasconcellos, actor
- Antônio Carlos Lemgruber, ex-president of the Central Bank of Brazil
- Antônio Silva Jardim, attorney and journalist
- Arnoldo Camanho de Assis, appellate judge do Tribunal de Justiça do Distrito Federal e dos Territórios, university professor
- Artur Ávila, Fields Medal winner
- Augusto Frederico Schmidt, poet, buisenessman, ex-president of Botafogo Football Club, co-founder of Botafogo de Futebol de Regatas, and Brazilian embassador to the United Nations and to the European Economic Community
- Cândido Barata Ribeiro, senator, first mayor of the Federal District, ex-minister of the Supremo Tribunal Federal
- Benjamin Constant, military officer, Brazilian Army Colonel, Minister of Education in the first republican government, Paraguay War veteran, recognized as a founding father of the Republic by Constitution of 1891.
- Casimiro Miguel, journalist, showman, comedian, YouTuber and Brazilian streamer.
- Clóvis Bevilacqua, jurist, author of the Civil Code of 1916
- Dom Estêvão Tavares Bittencourt, Servant of God, theologian, professor and writer
- Dom Rosalvo Costa Rego, bishop-auxiliar of the Rio de Janeiro Archdiocese
- Eduardo Lopes Pontes, medical doctor (PHD) by the Oxford University, member of the Academia Nacional de Medicina
- Fellipe Gamarano Barbosa, actor, director and screenwriter
- Tenente-brigadeiro do ar Faber Cintra, retired minister of the Superior Tribunal Militar
- Guilherme Fontes, actor and producer
- Heitor Villa-Lobos, maestro and composer
- Heleno de Freitas, football player and Botafogo idol
- Hélio de la Peña, humorist
- Henrique Maximiano Coelho Neto, writer and politician, founder of seat number two of the Academia Brasileira de Letras
- Hildebrando de Góis, mayor of the Distrito Federal
- José Eugênio Soares (Jô Soares), humorist
- João Procópio Ferreira, playwright
- Jorge Ricardo (Ricardinho), jockey
- José Trajano, sports journalist
- Lamartine Babo, músician and composer
- Luis Felipe Couto, author of the best-seller "Eu, Édipo"
- Márcio Gomes, journalist
- Mário Ipiranga dos Guaranys, admiral
- Nascimento Brito, journalista, ex-owner and director of the Jornal do Brasil
- Newton Braga, pioneer of the non-stop aerial crossing of the South Atlantic, aboard the seaplane Jahú
- Newton Moreira e Silva, PhD in political science, administrator, coordinator, and university professor; former president of the Fundação Escola de Serviço Público do Estado do Rio de Janeiro
- Noel Rosa, musician and composer
- Pascoal Carlos Magno, playwright, novelist, poet, theatre critic, and diplomat
- Paulo César Martinez y Alonso, journalist, lawyer, and writer. Rector of the Centro Universitário da Cidade do Rio de Janeiro
- Paulo Fortes, baritone
- Paulo Francis, journalist and writer
- Procópio Ferreira, actor, director, and playwright
- Raphael Montes, writer
- Raul Seixas, singer
- Rogério Marinho, director of O Globo, son of Irineu Marinho
- Thales Cavalcanti, actor
- Victour Antoun, lawyer, YouTuber, political commentator and politician
- Mario Cezar Oliva de Mattos, chemical engineer and entrepreneur

== Sources ==
Frazão, A., Nougué, C. St. Benedict's School of Rio de Janeiro: 150 years of history, 1858–2008. Rio de Janeiro, RJ: Letra Capital Publishing; 2008.

ERMAKOFF, George. Mosteiro de São Bento do Rio de Janeiro: 425 anos. Rio de Janeiro: George Ermakoff, 2016.
