= WXV =

Women's rugby union tournament for national teams (2023–2024)

- Most recent season or competition: 2026 WXV
- Sport: Rugby union
- Founded: 2021; 5 years ago
- First season: 2023; 3 years ago
- Folded: 2025; 1 year ago
- Replaced by: WXV Global Series & WXV Global Series Challenger
- No. of teams: 18
- Country: Worldwide
- Last champions: England (WXV 1); Australia (WXV 2); Spain (WXV 3)
- Website: wxvrugby.com

WXV was an annual international women's rugby union competition contested by national teams. It was staged in 2023 and 2024 as a three-tier tournament with WXV 1, WXV 2 and WXV 3, each containing six teams. Teams were divided into two pools of three and played only against the opposition in the opposite pool.

WXV was replaced after 2024 by the WXV Global Series and the WXV Global Series Challenger, which together form a three-year programme running from 2026 to 2028.

== Background ==
With the expansion of the 2025 Rugby World Cup from 12 to 16 teams, the test calendar was restructured, with WXV serving to revolutionise the women's international landscape. WXV was announced on 16 March 2021 with the inaugural edition intended to begin in September 2022, but due to the coronavirus pandemic it was pushed back to 2023 to accommodate the postponed 2021 Rugby World Cup. World Rugby committed to investing £6.4 million in the tournament. It was played within an international window from September to October, except in Rugby World Cup years.

== Format ==
WXV consisted of three tiers:

- WXV 1
- WXV 2
- WXV 3

Each tier contained six teams, competing over a single tournament window rather than a league season.

In both 2023 and 2024, all tiers used a cross-pool format. Teams were divided into two pools of three, grouped by region where possible, and played only against the opposition in the other pool. WXV 3 was originally announced as a round-robin tournament of four teams; this was later revised to a six-team cross-pool competition.

== Qualification ==
Teams could qualify through various regional competitions and both play-off and play-in fixtures for the three competition tiers. Each tier had designated regional slots allocated before the 2023 edition. From 2023, the allocation of slots in tiers two and three could change based on the region of the champion team and the lowest-ranked team. There was no guarantee that a team would play in the same tier as the previous year.

=== WXV 1 ===
In both the 2023 and 2024 editions, the top three teams from that year's Six Nations Championship and Pacific Four Series qualified for WXV 1. From 2026, the bottom-ranked side's regional place would have been relegated to WXV 2 and the top WXV 2 side's regional place would have been promoted.

=== WXV 2 ===
In 2023, the fourth-placed team from the Six Nations Championship and Pacific Four Series qualified for WXV 2 alongside the champions of the Oceania Rugby Women's Championship, the Asia Rugby Women's Championship, and the Rugby Africa Women's Cup. Additionally, the winner of a playoff between the fifth-placed team in the Six Nations and the champions of the Rugby Europe Women's Championship secured a place.

Starting in 2023, the champion of WXV 3 had their regional place elevated to WXV 2, displacing the sixth-placed team's regional place to WXV 3 for the following tournament. From 2026 onwards, this process would have also applied to the regional places of both the WXV 2 champion and the sixth-placed team in WXV 1.

=== WXV 3 ===
In 2023, the sixth-placed team from the Six Nations Championship, the runner-up in the playoff between the fifth-placed Six Nations team and the champion of the Rugby Europe Women's Championship, the winner of a play-in between Colombia and Brazil, and the runners-up from the respective regional tournaments in Asia, Africa, and Oceania qualified for WXV 3.

Beginning in 2023, the WXV 3 champion had their regional place promoted to tier two, displacing the sixth-placed WXV 2 team's place for the following tournament. The team finishing sixth was required to compete in a playoff with the best non-competing side in the World Rugby Rankings to decide who would take the final place in WXV 3 the following year.

== Results ==
=== WXV 1 ===
Ed.	Year	Host	Champion	Runner-up	3rd	4th	5th	6th
1	2023	New Zealand	England	Canada	Australia	New Zealand	France	Wales
2	2024	Canada	England	Ireland	Canada	New Zealand	France	United States
—N/a	2025	No competition held due to the 2025 Women's Rugby World Cup						

=== WXV 2 ===
Ed.	Year	Host	Champion	Runner-up	3rd	4th	5th	6th
1	2023	South Africa	Scotland	Italy	South Africa	Japan	United States	Samoa
2	2024	South Africa	Australia	Scotland	Italy	South Africa	Wales	Japan
—N/a	2025	No competition held due to the 2025 Women's Rugby World Cup						

=== WXV 3 ===
Ed.	Year	Host	Champion	Runner-up	3rd	4th	5th	6th
1	2023	United Arab Emirates	Ireland	Fiji	Spain	Kenya	Kazakhstan	Colombia
2	2024	United Arab Emirates	Spain	Samoa	Netherlands	Fiji	Hong Kong China	Madagascar
—N/a	2025	No competition held due to the 2025 Women's Rugby World Cup						

== Legacy and restructure ==
The WXV format was discontinued after 2024 as part of wider reforms to the women's international calendar. In September 2025, World Rugby and 18 national unions announced the WXV Global Series, a home-and-away touring programme for the top 12 ranked nations, and the WXV Global Series Challenger, a centrally hosted tournament for six emerging nations. Together they form a three-year cycle from 2026 to 2028 and are fully aligned with the qualification pathway for the 2029 Women's Rugby World Cup.

No competition was held in 2025 across all three tiers, as the year was reserved for the 2025 Women's Rugby World Cup.
