= ESPN (Brazil) =

Brazilian pay television sports network

- Country: Brazil
- Broadcast area: Brazil
- Headquarters: São Paulo, São Paulo

Programming
- Language: Portuguese
- Picture format: 720p (16:9 HDTV) (HD feed downgraded to letterboxed 480i for SDTV sets)

Ownership
- Owner: ESPN, LLC (operated by The Walt Disney Company Brazil through ESPN International)

History
- Launched: ESPN: March 31, 1989; ESPN2: 2005; ESPN3: April 29, 2009; ESPN4: February 5, 2012; ESPN5: January 24, 2014; ESPN6: March 24, 2016
- Former names: ESPN: Canal+ (1989–1991); TVA Esportes (1991–1995); ESPN Brasil (1995–2022); ESPN2: ESPN (2005–2022); ESPN3: ESPN HD (2009–2012); ESPN+ (2012–2018); ESPN2 (2018–2022); ESPN4: Fox Sports (2012–2022); ESPN5: Fox Sports 2 (2014–2024); ESPN6: ESPN Extra (2016–2024)

Links
- Website: https://espn.com.br/

Availability

Streaming media
- ESPN app: Watch live
- Disney+: Watch live

ESPN is the Brazilian division of ESPN, LLC Launched in March 1989 as Canal+, it was the first country-specific version of ESPN outside the United States, launched in June 1995. The channel has covered major sporting events, like the 1996, 2000, 2004, 2008, 2012, and 2016 Summer Olympics; the 1998, 2006, 2010 and 2014 FIFA World Cup and the 1999, 2003 and 2007 Pan-American Games. High ratings and prestige in the segment have been marks of the channel; it also won the APCA award twice, in 1995 for "Best Sports Programming" and in 1998 for "Best Coverage of the 1998 FIFA World Cup".

Despite having a team that is regarded as one of the best in Brazilian sports broadcasting and important broadcasting rights for international competitions like La Liga, Premier League and the Bundesliga, major local series rights have historically not been present; the Campeonato Brasileiro, Copa do Brasil and the states' championships are held by local Grupo Globo and SporTV. ESPN, however, has purchased the rights to broadcast the 2009, 2010 and 2011 editions of the Copa do Brasil for TV and Campeonato Paulista, Copa Libertadores de América, Campeonato Brasileiro Série A and Copa Sudamericana for radio.

In 2007, ESPN Brasil made a partnership with Rádio Eldorado to broadcast sports on radio. The new Rádio Eldorado ESPN used Eldorado's radio assets and the team of commentators from ESPN Brasil. It was renamed Rádio Estadão ESPN in 2007 due to a partnership agreement with the O Estado de S. Paulo newspaper.

In 2005 the company incorporated ESPN International coverage, starting to broadcast in two channels. Before this date, programs such as the SportsCenter International Edition, MLB and the NFL were transmitted directly from Bristol, Connecticut, with Portuguese audio from Andre Adler, Marco Alfaro, Sergio Cesario, Roby Porto, José Inácio Werneck, and Roberto Figueroa. Since 2005, shows and games are recorded and broadcast from its studios in São Paulo, though morning schedules continue to include USA and Latin American programs.

Prior to May 2011, programs produced by ESPN Brasil generally did not use in-game score graphics, though international programs had them. Beginning that month, ESPN Brasil began using the same score and other graphics used by the US channel.

In March 2012, the ESPN'S network in Brazil started with the broadcast 100% in HD with sports events and original programs. This is the same practice of ESPN in USA. The four channels of ESPN in Brazil is broadcast fully in HD.

In October 2013, ESPN launched a second screen app, ESPN Sync, to connect to broadcasts of football matches.

On May 6, 2020, Brazil's antitrust regulator CADE announced that ESPN and Fox Sports could merge their operations in Brazil together as of January 1, 2022, and not before, due to Fox Sports' broadcast rights and structure in the country, with ESPN taking over broadcast rights and structure after the merger.

In November 2021, it was announced that Disney would retire the ESPN Brasil brand after 26 years on air. ESPN Brasil became ESPN, while the current ESPN became ESPN 2, while the current ESPN 2 became ESPN 3, Fox Sports became ESPN 4. The change happened on January 17, 2022, and happened on February 15, 2024, for Fox Sports 2 and ESPN Extra as they became ESPN 5 and ESPN 6.

== ESPN channels in Brazil ==
Five separate channels of ESPN exist in Brazil:

- ESPN (formerly ESPN Brasil), the main channel, more football orientated with live debate, news, interviews and major international football games.
- ESPN2 (formerly ESPN), focused in US-based competitions (NBA, NFL and NHL).
- ESPN3 (formerly ESPN2), focused in extreme sports, MLB, tennis, rugby, cycling, golf and poker.
- ESPN4 (formerly Fox Sports), focused in motorsport, boxing, MMA and international football.
- ESPN5 (formerly Fox Sports 2), focused in football, and WWE.
- ESPN6 (formerly ESPN Extra), focused in extreme sports and wrestling.

== ESPN Brazil significant programming rights ==
=== Football ===
- CONMEBOL Libertadores
- CONMEBOL Sudamericana
- Recopa Sudamericana
- Campeonato Brasileiro Série B
- UEFA Women's Champions League
- Premier League
- EFL Championship
- EFL League One
- EFL League Two
- FA Cup
- EFL Cup
- EFL Trophy
- FA Community Shield
- Women's FA Cup
- Women's FA Community Shield
- FA Youth Cup
- Copa del Rey
- Supercopa de España
- Copa de la Reina de Fútbol
- Supercopa de España Femenina
- Serie A
- DFB-Pokal
- Primeira Liga
- Eredivisie
- Süper Lig
- FIFA World Cup qualification (UEFA)
- FIFA Women's World Cup qualification (UEFA)
- UEFA European Championship qualifying
- UEFA Women's Championship qualifying
- UEFA Nations League
- AFA Liga Profesional de Fútbol
- Supercopa Argentina
- Trofeo de Campeones de la Liga Profesional
- Supercopa Internacional
- Uruguayan Primera División
- Uruguayan Segunda División
- Supercopa Uruguaya
- Serie Rio de la Plata
- CONCACAF Gold Cup
- CONCACAF W Gold Cup
- CONCACAF W Gold Cup Qualifiers
- CONCACAF W Championship
- CONCACAF W Championship qualification
- CONCACAF Champions Cup
- CONCACAF W Champions Cup
- CONCACAF Central American Cup
- CONCACAF Caribbean Cup
- CONCACAF Under-20 Championship
- CONCACAF Under-17 Championship
- CONCACAF Women's U-20 Championship
- CONCACAF Women's U-17 Championship
- National Women's Soccer League
- USL Championship
- USL Super League
- USL Cup
- USL League One
- Liga MX (Atletico San Luis home matches)
- Liga MX Femenil (Atletico San Luis home matches)
- Liga de Expansión MX
- AFC Asian Cup
- AFC Women's Asian Cup
- Asian Qualifiers: Road to 2026
- AFC Champions League Elite
- AFC Women's Champions League
- AFC Champions League Two
- AFC U-23 Asian Cup
- AFC U-20 Asian Cup
- AFC U-17 Asian Cup
- AFC Women's Olympic Qualifying Tournament
- AFC U-20 Women's Asian Cup
- AFC U-17 Women's Asian Cup
- Kings World Cup Nations
- Kings World Cup Clubs
- Américas Kings League
- Américas Queens League

=== American Football ===
- National Football League
- Liga de Fútbol Americano Profesional
- College Football

=== Badminton ===
- BWF World Championships
- Thomas Cup & Uber Cup
- BWF World Tour
- European Men's and Women's Team Badminton Championships

=== Baseball ===
- Major League Baseball
- World Baseball Classic
- Mexican League
- Colombian Professional Baseball League
- Little League World Series
- College baseball

=== Basketball ===
- NBA
- WNBA
- College Basketball
- NBA Summer League
- NBA G League
- NBB
- Liga de Basquete Feminino
- Liga Ouro de Basquete
- Athletes Unlimited Basketball
- Circuito de Baloncesto de la Costa del Pacífico

=== Boxing ===
- ESPN Knockout

=== College Sports ===
- National Collegiate Athletic Association events

=== Cricket ===
- Cricket World Cup
- Women's Cricket World Cup
- ICC World Cup Qualifier
- ICC World Twenty20
- ICC Women's T20 World Cup
- ICC T20 World Cup Qualifier
- ICC Champions Trophy
- ICC Women's Champions Trophy
- ICC World Test Championship Final
- Under 19 Cricket World Cup
- Under-19 Women's T20 World Cup

=== Cycling ===
- Tour de France
- Tour de France Femmes
- Vuelta a España
- La Vuelta Femenina
- Tour Down Under
- Paris–Nice
- Critérium du Dauphiné
- Tour of Armenia
- Tour Colombia
- Vuelta a El Salvador
- Volta Ciclista a Catalunya Femenina
- Tour of Flanders
- Paris–Roubaix
- Liège–Bastogne–Liège
- Omloop Het Nieuwsblad
- Gent–Wevelgem
- Dwars door Vlaanderen
- Amstel Gold Race
- La Flèche Wallonne
- Scheldeprijs
- Brabantse Pijl
- Brussels Cycling Classic
- Paris–Tours

=== Darts ===
- PDC World Darts Championship
- World Matchplay
- Grand Slam of Darts
- World Grand Prix

=== Futsal ===
- AFC Futsal Asian Cup

=== Golf ===
- The Masters
- PGA Championship
- U.S. Open
- The Open Championship
- PGA Tour
- PGA European Tour
- President's Cup
- Ryder Cup
- U.S. Women's Open
- U.S. Senior Open
- U.S. Senior Women's Open
- Women's British Open
- Senior Open
- Senior PGA Championship
- Walker Cup
- Curtis Cup
- Augusta National Women's Amateur
- The Amateur Championship
- The Women's Amateur Championship
- U.S. Amateur
- U.S. Women's Amateur
- U.S. Junior Amateur Golf Championship
- U.S. Girls' Junior Championship
- U.S. Adaptive Open
- Latin America Amateur Championship
- Asia-Pacific Amateur Championship
- Women's Asia-Pacific Amateur Championship

=== Horse Racing ===
- Kentucky Derby
- Preakness Stakes
- Belmont Stakes
- Pegasus World Cup
- Saudi Cup
- Dubai World Cup
- Grand National
- Epsom Derby
- Prix de Diane
- Royal Ascot
- Eclipse Stakes
- Haskell Stakes
- King George VI and Queen Elizabeth Stakes
- Glorious Goodwood
- Whitney Stakes
- Fourstardave Handicap
- International Stakes
- Kentucky Turf Cup
- Kentucky Downs Turf Sprint Stakes
- Irish Champion Stakes
- Woodbine Mile
- Coolmore Turf Mile Stakes
- Prix de l'Arc de Triomphe
- Spinster Stakes
- British Champions Day
- Breeders' Cup
- Melbourne Cup
- Bahrain International
- Hong Kong International Races

=== Ice Hockey ===
- National Hockey League

=== Marathon ===
- Seville Marathon
- Tokyo Marathon
- New York City Half Marathon
- Rotterdam Marathon
- Boston Marathon
- London Marathon
- Madrid Marathon
- Prague Marathon
- Stockholm Marathon
- Sydney Marathon
- Berlin Marathon
- Chicago Marathon
- Frankfurt Marathon
- Venice Marathon
- New York Marathon
- Valencia Marathon

=== Mixed Martial Arts ===
- Professional Fighters League
- Legacy Fighting Alliance

=== Motorsport ===
- MotoGP
- Moto2
- Moto3
- Red Bull MotoGP Rookies Cup
- Asia Talent Cup
- Harley-Davidson Bagger World Cup
- Dakar Rally
- IndyCar Series
- Indy NXT
- NASCAR Cup Series
- NASCAR O'Reilly Auto Parts Series
- NASCAR Truck Series
- NASCAR Brasil Series
- DTM
- ADAC GT Masters
- Extreme H
- AMA Supersport Championship

=== Multi-Sport Events ===
- Special Olympics World Games

=== Padel ===
- Padel World Championship
- Premier Padel
- Hexagon Cup
- Reserve Cup

=== Polo ===
- Campeonato Argentino Abierto de Polo
- Campeonato Abierto de Hurlingham
- Campeonato Abierto del Tortugas Country Club

=== Rugby ===
- Rugby World Cup
- Women's Rugby World Cup
- Nations Championship
- Nations Cup
- Six Nations Championship
- The Rugby Championship
- Rugby World Cup South America qualification
- World Rugby Pacific Nations Cup
- Super Rugby
- Super Rugby Americas
- Currie Cup
- National Provincial Championship
- WXV Global Series
- Women's Six Nations Championship
- Super Rugby Aupiki
- Farah Palmer Cup
- World Rugby Under 20 Championship
- World Rugby Under 20 Challenger Cup
- Six Nations Under 20s Championship
- Under 20s Rugby Championship
- SVNS
- Women's SVNS
- SVNS 2
- Top 14 de la URBA
- Torneo del Interior
- Major League Rugby
- Campeonato Uruguayo de Rugby
- Test-matches

=== Skiing ===
- FIS Alpine World Ski Championships
- FIS Nordic World Ski Championships
- FIS Snowboard World Championships
- FIS Freestyle World Ski Championships
- FIS Alpine Ski World Cup
- FIS Cross-Country World Cup
- FIS Freestyle Ski World Cup
- FIS Nordic Combined World Cup
- FIS Ski Jumping World Cup
- FIS Snowboard World Cup

=== Tennis ===
- Australian Open
- Roland Garros
- Wimbledon
- U.S. Open
- ATP Finals
- ATP 1000
- ATP 500
- ATP 250
- WTA Finals
- WTA 1000
- WTA 500
- WTA 250
- Billie Jean King Cup
- Next Generation ATP Finals
- Laver Cup

=== Triathlon ===
- Ironman World Championship
- Ironman Pro Series

=== Volleyball ===
- Women's European Volleyball Championship
- Men's European Volleyball Championship
- LOVB Pro
- Athletes Unlimited Volleyball

=== Weightlifting ===
- World Weightlifting Championships

=== Yachting ===
- America's Cup
- America's Cup Qualifiers and Challenger Playoffs
- America's Cup World Series
- Women's America's Cup
- Youth America's Cup

== Programs broadcast by ESPN Brazil ==
- Além da Bola
- ATP Tour Uncovered
- Bola da Vez
- Clássicos ESPN
- Compacto NFL
- Destaques da CONMEBOL Libertadores
- Destaques da CONMEBOL Sudamericana
- Destaques dos X Games
- Equipe F
- ESPN Filmes
- ESPN League
- F1: The Inside Line
- FA Cup Highlights
- F Show
- La Liga World
- Linha de Passe
- Mina de Passe
- Momento ESPN
- Mundo F
- Mundo Premier League
- MunDu Menezes
- NBA Action
- Pelas Quadras
- Premier League Stories
- Prévia da FA Cup
- Puxeta
- Resenha
- Resenha da Rodada
- Show da Rodada: La Liga
- Show da Rodada: Premier League
- Show da Rodada: Serie A
- SportsCenter Abre o Jogo
- SportsCenter Brazil
- SportsCenter U.S.
- UEFA Nations League: Match Day Highlights
- UEFA Nations League: Match Night Highlights

== ESPN Brazil staff ==
- Airton Cunha – Tennis commentator
- Alex Tseng – host
- André Donke – soccer commentator
- André Hernan - Presenter
- André Kfouri – Reporter; "Equipe F" and "SportsCenter" host
- Amoroso – soccer commentator
- André Linares – Reporter
- André Plihal – "Resenha" and "Bola da Vez" host
- Antonio Martoni – Rugby commentator
- Ari Aguiar – Play-by-play announcer and "ESPN League" host
- Bruno Andrade - soccer commentator
- Bruno Vicari – "SportsCenter" host
- Caco da Motta - soccer commentator
- Carlos Eugênio Simon – soccer refereeing commentator
- Celso Ardengue - soccer commentator
- Celso Unzelte – soccer commentator
- Christian Fittipaldi – IndyCar Series commentator
- Cícero Mello – Reporter
- Cledi Oliveira – Play-by-play announcer
- Conrado Giulietti - Play-by-play announcer
- Diego Garcia - Reporter and commentator
- Diego Lugano – soccer commentator and "Resenha" co-host
- Edgard Mello Filho – Motorsport commentator
- Eduardo Affonso – Reporter
- Eduardo Agra – NBA and College Basketball commentator
- Eduardo de Menezes – Reporter and "Além da Bola" and "F Show" host
- Eduardo Elias – "SportsCenter" host
- Elton Serra - soccer commentator
- Eugênio Leal – soccer commentator
- Fábio Luciano – soccer commentator
- Fausto Macieira – MotoGP commentator
- Felipe André - Reporter
- Felipe Motta – "SportsCenter" host
- Felipe Silva - soccer commentator
- Fernando Campos – soccer commentator
- Fernando Meligeni - Tennis commentator
- Fernando Nardini – Play-by-play announcer and "SportsCenter" co-host
- Fernando Ribeiro – Play-by-play announcer
- Fernando Saraiva – soccer commentator
- Flávio Pereira - Play-by-play announcer
- Gian Oddi – Soccer commentator
- Gláucia Santiago – "SportsCenter" host
- Guilherme Giovannoni - Basketball commentator
- Gustavo Berton – Reporter
- Gustavo Hofman – Soccer commentator and Reporter
- Gustavo Zupak – Soccer commentator
- Gustavo Santos - Play-by-play announcer
- Hamilton Rodrigues – Play-by-play announcer
- Helen Luz - Basketball commentator
- Hugo Botelho – Play-by-play announcer
- Jaílson Vilas Boas - soccer commentator
- João Castelo Branco – Reporter
- José Roberto Lux "Zé Boquinha" – NBA and College Basketball commentator
- Juliana Tesser – MotoGP commentator
- Leonardo Bertozzi – Soccer commentator
- Leonardo Gaciba – soccer refereeing commentator
- Leonardo Sasso - Basketball commentator
- Lilliany Nascimento - Reporter
- Luan Amaral - Reporter
- Luciana Marianno – Play-by-play announcer and "Mina de Passe" host
- Luciano Amaral – "Mundo F" host
- Luisão - soccer commentator
- Luiz Carlos Largo – Play-by-play announcer
- Marcela Rafael – "SportsCenter" host
- Mariana Becker - Reporter
- Mario Marra – soccer commentator
- Matheus Pinheiro – Play-by-play announcer
- Matheus Suman – Play-by-play announcer
- Maurício Bonato – Play-by-play announcer
- Melbya Rolim - Reporter
- Mendel Bydlowski – Reporter
- Osvaldo Pascoal – soccer commentator
- Paulo Antunes – NFL and NBA commentator; "ESPN League" co-host
- Paulo Calçade – Soccer commentator
- Paulo Soares – Play-by-play announcer and "SportsCenter" host
- Pedro Henrique Torre – Reporter
- Rafael Marques – soccer commentator
- Raphael Prates – soccer commentator
- Renan do Couto – Play-by-play announcer
- Renan Rocha – Play-by-play announcer
- Renata Ruel – soccer refereeing commentator
- Renato Rodrigues – soccer commentator
- Ricardo Melo – golf commentator
- Roberta Barroso – Reporter
- Rodrigo Bueno – soccer commentator
- Rogério Vaughan – Play-by-play announcer
- Rubens Pozzi – Reporter and Sportscenter co-host
- Silas Pereira – soccer commentator
- Teliana Pereira - tennis commentator
- Thiago Alves – Play-by-play announcer and Motorsport commentator
- Thiago Simões – Soccer, cricket and NHL commentator
- Ubiratan Leal – Soccer and MLB commentator
- Vinicius Moura – Play-by-play announcer
- Vinicius Nicoletti – Reporter
- Victoria Leite - Reporter
- Victor Martins – Motorsport commentator
- Vladimir Bianchini - Reporter
- Weinny Eirado – NFL, MLB and College Football commentator
- William Tavares – "Linha de Passe" co-host; play-by-play announcer and "Equipe F" host
- Zé Elias – soccer commentator
- Zinho – soccer commentator

== See also ==
- ESPN
- ESPN (Latin America)
- ESPN International
