= Nations Championship =

International rugby union competition

- Current season, competition or edition: 2026 Nations Championship
- Sport: Rugby union
- Founded: 2023; 3 years ago
- First season: 2026
- No. of teams: 12
- Broadcasters: List of broadcasters

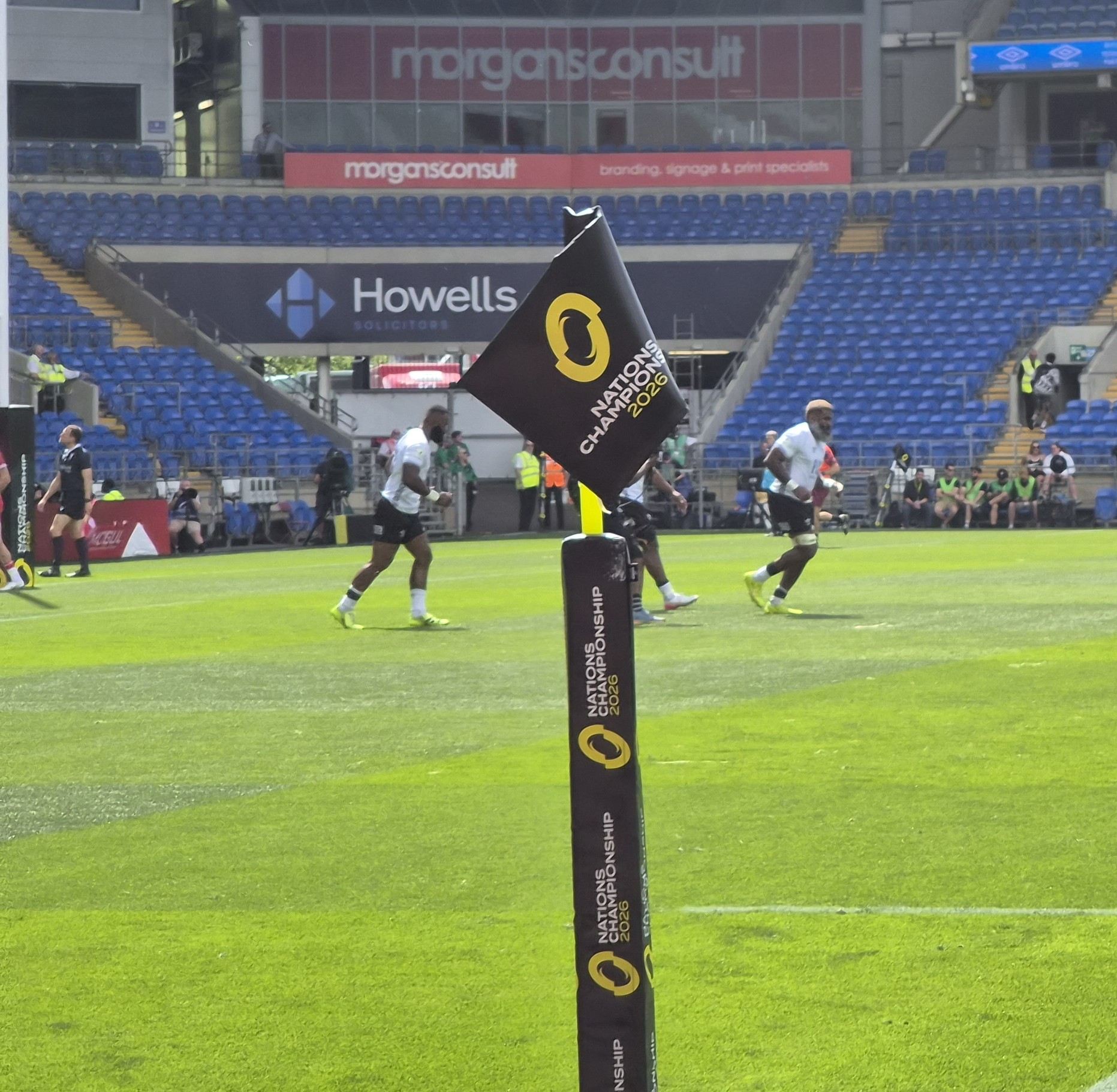
Nations Championship logo displayed on a pitchside flag during the Wales–Fiji match

The Nations Championship is a biennial international men's rugby union competition, which is scheduled to take place in the mid-year and end-of-year international windows in even-numbered years. The inaugural edition began in 2026.

== Format ==
The competition consists of twelve teams, involving the current Six Nations (England, France, Italy, Ireland, Scotland and Wales) and SANZAAR (Argentina, Australia, South Africa and New Zealand) unions, in addition to two invited unions, Fiji and Japan. The competition is scheduled to be held in even-numbered years, as these are the years when there is no British & Irish Lions tour or Rugby World Cup, both of which are prestigious and of commercial importance to the sport.

The format of the competition includes a "European Conference", consisting of the Six Nations unions, and a "SANZAAR and Pacific Conference" comprising the four SANZAAR nations and the two invited unions (Japan and Fiji). Each team will play the six nations in the opposing conference across the July and November test windows, following which each team will play their equivalent-placed finisher in the opposing hemisphere, with a grand final between the top ranked finishers of each conference to be played at the end of the November window to decide the tournament champion.

== World Rugby Nations Cup ==
A second competition, run by World Rugby, is taking place concurrently and consists of twelve further teams, with promotion and relegation between the divisions commencing from the start of the third edition in 2030.

== Teams ==
With no promotion and relegation in the first two editions, the following teams will contest the first three editions.

Nations Championship
Team	Competition	Region
Northern Hemisphere
England	Six Nations Championship	Europe
France	Six Nations Championship	Europe
Ireland	Six Nations Championship	Europe
Italy	Six Nations Championship	Europe
Scotland	Six Nations Championship	Europe
Wales	Six Nations Championship	Europe
Southern Hemisphere
Argentina	The Rugby Championship	South America
Australia	The Rugby Championship	Oceania
Fiji	Pacific Nations Cup	Oceania
Japan (Note: Although Japan is not in the Southern Hemisphere, it is grouped with other Pacific Ocean nations.)	Pacific Nations Cup	Asia
New Zealand	The Rugby Championship	Oceania
South Africa	The Rugby Championship	Africa

== Results ==
Ed.	Year	Finals host	First place final			Third place final			Minor placements							
Ed.	Year	Finals host	Champion	Score	Runner‑up	Third	Score	Fourth	5th	6th	7th	8th	9th	10th	11th	12th
1	2026	England		—			—									

=== Qualification results ===
Team	2026	2028	2030	Years
Argentina	4th	TBD	TBD	3
Australia	3rd	TBD	TBD	3
England	2nd	TBD	TBD	3
Fiji	6th	TBD	TBD	3
France	1st	TBD	TBD	3
Ireland	3rd	TBD	TBD	3
Italy	6th	TBD	TBD	3
Japan	5th	TBD	TBD	3
New Zealand	2nd	TBD	TBD	3
Scotland	4th	TBD	TBD	3
South Africa	1st	TBD	TBD	3
Wales	5th	TBD	TBD	3
Total	12	12	12	3

== Criticism ==
The creation of the Nations Championship has been criticised for "ring-fencing" smaller nations outside elite competition, and narrowing their opportunities to play against top nations. It has also been criticised for potentially devaluing the Rugby World Cup. World Rugby's Chief Executive, Alan Gilpin, countered the complaints by stating: “The suggestions that this just makes the rich richer are misplaced. This creates a better landscape.” He added that there would be “50% guaranteed more crossover fixtures” in non-tournament years.

== Broadcasting rights ==
Broadcasters include:

Territory	Rights holder	Ref.
Andorra	Movistar Plus+	
Asia	Premier Sports	
Canada	Premier Sports	
Australia	Nine (Note: All Australia matches played on Australian soil. (See also § Australian anti-siphoning laws).); Stan Sport	
Austria	ProSiebenSat.1 Media	
Germany	ProSiebenSat.1 Media	
Liechtenstein	ProSiebenSat.1 Media	
Luxembourg	ProSiebenSat.1 Media	
Switzerland	ProSiebenSat.1 Media	
Caribbean	ESPN	
Czech Republic	Nova Sport	
Slovakia	Nova Sport	
Estonia	Go3 Sport	
Latvia	Go3 Sport	
Lithuania	Go3 Sport	
Fiji	FBC	
France	TF1	
Georgia	Rugby TV	
Ireland	Virgin Media	
Italy	Sky	
San Marino	Sky	
Japan	Wowow	
Latin America	ESPN	
MENA	Starzplay	
Netherlands	Ziggo Sport	
New Zealand	Sky Sport	
Pacific Islands	Digicel	
Papua New Guinea	Digicel	
Portugal	Sport TV	
Romania	Digi Sport	
Spain	Movistar Plus+	
Sub-saharan Africa	SuperSport	
United Kingdom	ITV (English) (Note: ITV1 and ITV4 in England, Wales, Southern Scotland, Northern Ireland, the Isle of Man and Channel Islands; STV in Scotland.)	
United Kingdom	S4C (Welsh) (Note: Wales matches only.)	
United States	RugbyPass	

== See also ==
- WXV Global Series
- World Rugby Nations Cup
