= Paulo Soares (journalist) =

Brazilian journalist (1962–2025)

- Born: Paulo Soares; 13 September 1962; São Paulo, Brazil
- Died: 29 September 2025 (aged 63); São Paulo, Brazil
- Other names: Amigão, Amigão da Galera
- Occupations: Journalist; Television presenter; Sports broadcaster
- Years active: 1978–2025
- Known for: Presenting SportsCenter on ESPN Brasil
- Spouse: Marlene

Paulo Soares (September 13, 1962 – September 29, 2025), also known as Amigão da Galera or simply Amigão, was a Brazilian television presenter and sports announcer. He worked for ESPN Brasil, where he became well known for presenting the Brazilian version of the sports program SportsCenter alongside journalist Antero Greco.

The nickname Amigão da Galera (Everyone's Friend) came about in 1990, coined by his colleague and reporter Osvaldo Pascoal, then at Rádio Record.

== Biography ==
Born in São Paulo, Paulo Soares began his career at age 15, in 1978, at Rádio Clube de Araras, in Araras, city in the interior of São Paulo. From there, he moved on to several other radio stations in Brazil until arriving, in 1983, at Rádio Gazeta, in the state capital. Rádio Record, Gazeta again, Rádio Globo, Rádio Bandeirantes São Paulo, and Rádio Estadão followed, in a long period lasting until 2012.

Paulo made his TV debut in 1983 on Gazeta, later moving on to Record and Cultura, and in 1994 to TVA Esportes, which was the embryo of ESPN in Brazil, founded in 1995. On TV, his main work was the Brazilian version of the American program SportsCenter, where he shared the panel with journalist Antero Greco, who died in 2024. "Amigão” and Antero Greco has hosted SportsCenter for over 20 years, since the program's initial phase in 2001 on ESPN, created in 2000 during the coverage of the Sydney Olympics. Still at ESPN, in addition to his work as a narrator, he hosted programs that became references in Brazilian sports journalism, such as Linha de Passe, Bola da Vez, Futebol no Mundo and Dueto.

His last television appearance was in 2024, in an ESPN tribute to Antero Greco. According to journalist Gabriel Vaquer of Folha de S. Paulo newspaper, after his last appearance, he spoke frequently with ESPN colleagues and always stated that his goal was to return to host SportsCenter. The host had a lifetime contract with the network, automatically renewed every two years.

=== Death ===
Paulo Soares died on September 29, 2025. Paulo had been battling several health problems for years, including a spinal problem, and suffered multiple organ failure. He had been hospitalized at the Sírio-Libanês Hospital, in São Paulo, since April 2025, where he died.

His body was laid out at the Funeral Home, in the Bela Vista neighborhood, in São Paulo.

== Personal life ==
He was married to Marlene Soares. The couple had no children. He was a movie buff, having a collection of more than four thousand DVDs. He was a die-hard fan of São Paulo FC. In his honor, the club released a statement and observed a minute of silence before the club's match against Ceará in the 2025 Brasileirão.

== Broadcasts ==
=== Radio ===
- 1978: Rádio Clube - Araras
- 1979–1980: Rádio Clube - Santos
- 1981: Rádio Cacique - Santos
- 1982: Rádio Guarujá - Guarujá
- 1983: Rádio Difusora Oeste - Osasco
- 1983–1985: Rádio Gazeta - São Paulo
- 1985–1992: Rádio Record - São Paulo
- 1992: Rádio Gazeta - São Paulo
- 1992-1998: Rádio Globo- São Paulo
- 1999–2001: Rádio Bandeirantes São Paulo - São Paulo
- 2007–2012: Rádio Estadão - São Paulo

=== Television ===
- 1983–1985: TV Gazeta - São Paulo
- 1985–1991: TV Record - São Paulo
- 1992–1993: TV Cultura - São Paulo
- 1994–1995: TVA - São Paulo
- 1995–2025: ESPN Brasil - São Paulo
- 1998 e 2003: SBT - São Paulo

=== News coverage ===
As a journalist, he has covered 9 FIFA World Cups, as well as the Olympic Games, Copa América and Confederations Cup.

- 1986 FIFA World Cup – Radio and TV Record
- 1990 FIFA World Cup – Radio and TV Record
- 1994 FIFA World Cup – Rádio Globo
- 1998 FIFA World Cup – ESPN Brasil and SBT
- 2002 FIFA World Cup – ESPN Brasil
- 2006 FIFA World Cup – ESPN Brasil
- 2010 FIFA World Cup – ESPN Brasil
- 2014 FIFA World Cup – ESPN Brasil
- 2018 FIFA World Cup – ESPN Brasil

== Prizes ==
Awards and nominations from Paulo Soares
Year	Award	Category	Event location	Result	Ref.
2008	ACEESP Trophy (Associação dos Cronistas Esportivos do Estado de São Paulo)	Pay TV Presenter	São Paulo, Brazil	Won	
2009	ACEESP Trophy (Associação dos Cronistas Esportivos do Estado de São Paulo)	Pay TV Presenter	São Paulo, Brazil	Won	
2010	ACEESP Trophy (Associação dos Cronistas Esportivos do Estado de São Paulo)	Pay TV Presenter	São Paulo, Brazil	Won	
2011	ACEESP Trophy (Associação dos Cronistas Esportivos do Estado de São Paulo)	Pay TV Presenter	São Paulo, Brazil	Won	
2012	ACEESP Trophy (Associação dos Cronistas Esportivos do Estado de São Paulo)	Pay TV Presenter	São Paulo, Brazil	Won	
2013	ACEESP Trophy (Associação dos Cronistas Esportivos do Estado de São Paulo)	Pay TV Presenter	São Paulo, Brazil	Won	
2014	ACEESP Trophy (Associação dos Cronistas Esportivos do Estado de São Paulo)	TV Presenter	São Paulo, Brazil	Nominated	
2015	ACEESP Trophy (Associação dos Cronistas Esportivos do Estado de São Paulo)	Pay TV Presenter	São Paulo, Brazil	Nominated	
2017	ACEESP Trophy (Associação dos Cronistas Esportivos do Estado de São Paulo)	TV Presenter	São Paulo, Brazil	Won	
2019	ACEESP Trophy (Associação dos Cronistas Esportivos do Estado de São Paulo)	TV Presenter	São Paulo, Brazil	Won	
