= Silvio Luiz (commentator) =

Brazilian sports commentator (1934–2024)

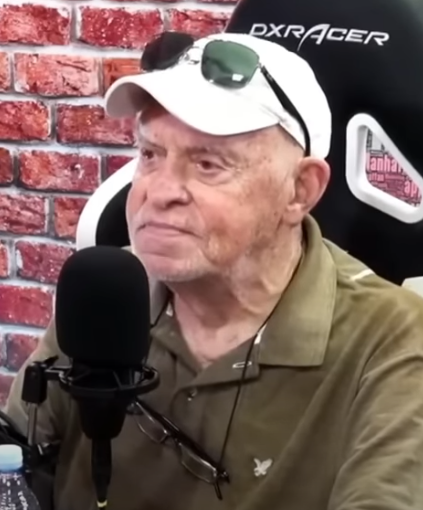
- Silvio Luiz in 2022
- Born: Sylvio Luiz Perez Machado de Souza; 14 July 1934; São Paulo, Brazil
- Died: 16 May 2024 (aged 89); São Paulo, Brazil
- Occupations: Sports commentator and television presenter

Sylvio Luiz Perez Machado de Souza (14 July 1934 – 16 May 2024) was a Brazilian sports commentator and television presenter.

He became famous for his irreverent way of narrating football matches, never saying the word "goal" when a team scored. He was also famous for his catchphrases, such as "Olho no lance!" (Look at the play!), "Pelas barbas do profeta!" (For the prophet's beard!), "Pelo amor dos meus filhinhos!" (For the love of my little children!), among others. He was also the commentator of the Pro Evolution Soccer franchise in the Portuguese language version from 2011 to 2016.

Silvio Luiz died on 16 May 2024 as a result of a stroke suffered while working on the broadcast of the 2024 Campeonato Paulista final on 07 April 2024. He was 89.
