= 2026 WXV Global Series Challenger =

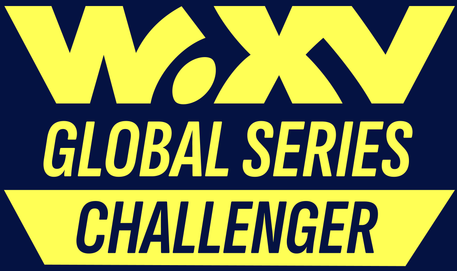

Tournament details
- Host: Hong Kong
- Dates: 13 – 26 September 2026
- Teams: Brazil; Fiji; Hong Kong China; Netherlands; Samoa; Spain
- Champions: Fiji (1st title)

Tournament statistics
- Matches played: 9
- Most tries: (Netherlands) Kika Mulling (5)

The 2026 WXV Global Series Challenger took place at Kai Tak Sports Park in Hong Kong from 13 to 26 September 2026, with triple-header matchdays on 13, 19 and 26 September. The competition is fully funded by World Rugby and uses the cross-pool format of the previous WXV system, with two pools of three teams each playing the three teams from the other pool.

== Participating nations ==
Nation	Competition	Regional association	World Rugby ranking
Brazil	—N/a (Note: South America does not have a competition structure for their national women's XV teams)	South America	25
Fiji	Oceania Rugby Women's Championship	Oceania	12
Hong Kong China	Asia Rugby Women's Championship	Asia	16
Netherlands	Rugby Europe Women's Championship	Europe	17
Samoa	Oceania Rugby Women's Championship	Oceania	15
Spain	Rugby Europe Women's Championship	Europe	14

== Pools ==
The pools have been arranged as follows:

WXV Global Series Challenger
Team	Competition	Region
Europe and Asia Pool
Hong Kong	Asia Rugby Women's Championship	Asia
Spain	Rugby Europe Women's Championship	Europe
Netherlands	Rugby Europe Championship	Europe
Americas and Pacific Pool
Brazil	No regional Competition	South America
Samoa	Oceania Rugby Women's Championship	Oceania
Fiji	Oceania Rugby Women's Championship	Oceania

== Standings ==
2026 WXV Global Series Challenger
Pos	Team	Pld	W	D	L	PF	PA	PD	TF	TA	B	Pts
1	Fiji	3	3	0	0	112	75	+37	17	0	2	14
2	Netherlands	3	2	0	1	104	35	+69	18	0	2	10
3	Spain	3	1	1	1	93	59	+34	13	0	3	9
4	Hong Kong (H)	3	1	0	2	72	112	−40	12	0	2	6
5	Brazil	3	0	1	2	39	46	−7	6	0	3	5
6	Samoa	3	1	0	2	55	148	−93	8	0	1	5

Source: WXV
(H) Host

== Fixtures ==
Fixtures were scheduled for 13, 19 and 26 September 2026 at the 5,000 capacity Kai Tak Youth Sports Ground, Hong Kong.

=== Match week 1 (13 September) ===
13 September 2026
12:00 HKT (UTC+8)

(2 BP) Spain	32–38	Fiji (1 BP)
Try: V. Pérez 28' c, 53' m Cano 41' c Argudo 64' c Con: Argudo (3/4) 29', 42', 65'; Pen: Argudo 9', 24'	Report	Try: Ralivanawa 5' c Neihamu 19' m Fisher 37'c Rokowati 66' c Nailolo 76' c Tove 80' m Con: Qoro (4/6) 6', 38', 67', 77'

Kai Tak Youth Sports Ground, Hong Kong
Referee: Amber Stamp-Dunstan, Wales

13 September 2026
15:30 HKT (UTC+8)

(1 BP) Hong Kong China	29–24	Brazil (2 BP)
Try: Dhar 18' m, 23' c Lee 67' m, 77' m Penalty try 83'; Con: Smith (1/4) 24'	Report	Try: Penalty try 5'; Carvalho 12' c Costa 29' m Dos Santos 56' m Con: Tenorio (1/4) 13'

Kai Tak Youth Sports Ground, Hong Kong
Attendance: 2,900
Referee: Hibiki Ikeda, Japan

13 September 2026
19:00 HKT (UTC+8)

(1 BP) Netherlands	70–0	Samoa
Try: van der Schoot 2' c, 40' m Mulling 6' m, 21' m, 41' m, 81' c van der Velden 10' m, 60' c Prins 15' c Stallmann 30' m Luijken 55' c Boot 74' m Con: Metz (3/9) 3', 16', 56'; Kievit (2/3) 61', 82'	Report

Kai Tak Youth Sports Ground, Hong Kong
Referee: Precious Pazani, Zimbabwe

=== Match week 2 (19 September) ===
19 September 2026
12:00 HKT (UTC+8)

Samoa	21–61	Spain (1 BP)
Try: Savelio 44' c, 53' c Falaniko 66' c Con: Leiataua (2/2) 45', 54'; Ah Cheung (66'); Cards: (yellow card) 2' Afuie; (yellow card) 57' Tafoulua; (yellow card) 79' Fepuleai	Report	Try: C. Pérez 3' m V. Pérez 17' c, 47' c Fernández de Corres 25'c Capell 28' c Martínez 38' c Cortés 49' c Argudo 61' m Gil 81' c Con: Peña (5/7) 18', 26', 29', 39', 48', 50'; Argudo (2/2) 61', 81'

Kai Tak Youth Sports Ground, Hong Kong
Referee: Emma Gallagher, Canada

19 September 2026
15:30 HKT (UTC+8)

(1 BP) Fiji	54–26	Hong Kong China (1 BP)
Try: Nailolo 8' c Qoro 11' m, 29' c Ralivanawa 34' c, 39' m Neivosa 36' c Sorokacika 51' c Duva 68' c Con: Qoro (6/8) 9', 30', 35', 37', 40', 52'; Vueti (1/1) 69'	Report	Try: Dhar 17' c Lynam 26' c Knowler 56'c Bolton 81' m Con: Knowler (3/4) 18', 28', 57'

Kai Tak Youth Sports Ground, Hong Kong
Attendance: 2,700
Referee: Giana Viljoen, South Africa

19 September 2026
19:00 HKT (UTC+8)

Brazil (1 BP)	15–17	Netherlands
Try: Kochhann 5' c Barth 72' m Con: Kochhann (1/2) 5'; Pen: Kochhann 53'; Cards: (yellow card) 44' Costa	Report	Try: Mulling 21' m Jongerius 35' m Muggleton 44' c Con: Touw (1/3) 44'; Cards: (yellow card) 64' Kievit

Kai Tak Youth Sports Ground, Hong Kong
Referee: Sunny Lee, Hong Kong

=== Match week 3 (26 September) ===
26 September 2026
17:00 (Note: Delayed due to World Rugby's heat protocols) HKT (UTC+8)

Fiji	20–17	Netherlands (1 BP)
Try: Neivosa 7' c Rokowati 14' m Naliva 65' m Con: Qoro (1/3) 8'; Pen: Qoro 80'; Cards: (yellow card) 19' Nakesa	Report	Try: Boot 39' c van der Velden 44' m Kievit 56' m Con: Metz (1/3) 39'

Kai Tak Youth Sports Ground, Hong Kong
Attendance: 2,900
Referee: Emma Gallagher, Canada

26 September 2026
19:00 HKT (UTC+8)

Spain	Cancelled (Note: Cancelled due to World Rugby's heat protocols)	Brazil

Kai Tak Youth Sports Ground, Hong Kong
Referee: Amber Stamp-Dunstan, Wales

26 September 2026
20:15 HKT (UTC+8)

Hong Kong China	17–34	Samoa
Try: Dhar 11' m, 36' c Chow 79'm Con: Schats (1/3) 37'	Report	Try: Aumua (2' m Auimatagi 6'; Fiafia 28' c Afuie 53' c Lasini 57' c Con: Afuie (1/3) 29'; Leiataua (2/2) 54', 58'; Pen: Leiataua 73'

Kai Tak Youth Sports Ground, Hong Kong
Referee: Giana Viljoen, South Africa

== See also ==
- 2026 women's rugby union internationals
- 2026 WXV Global Series
- 2026 World Rugby Nations Cup
