= Agência Estado =

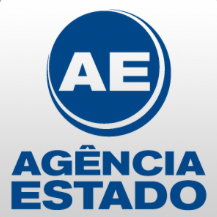
- Industry: News agency
- Founded: 1970
- Headquarters: São Paulo, Brazil
- Website: institucional.ae.com.br

Agência Estado is a Private News Agency in Brazil. It was started by Brazilian media group Grupo Estado.

== History ==
Agência Estado was founded on 4 January 1970, with the main purpose of centralizing the distribution of news and photographs produced by the newspapers O Estado de S. Paulo and Jornal da Tarde in São Paulo, in the interior of the state, and in major capitals around the world.

At the end of the 1980s, Agência Estado underwent a restructuring that involved changes to employees' working hours and investments in technology. During the 1990s, 75 of the country's 100 main publications reproduced the news distributed by the agency.

In 1991, Agência Estado acquired Broadcast Teleinformática, a company responsible for providing stock and commodity quotes to the financial market. In 1995, Agência Estado, through the website World News, began distributing Estadão's news on the internet, making it the first company of its kind in Brazil to use the technology.
