= Ivamere Rokowati =

- Born: 15 April 2001 (age 25)
- Height: 1.74 m (5 ft 9 in)
- Weight: 71 kg (157 lb)

Rugby union career
National sevens team
Years	Team	Comps
- Fiji
Medal record
Representing Fiji
Women's rugby sevens
Commonwealth Games
Silver medal – second place	2022 Birmingham	Team competition

Ivamere Rokowati (born 15 April 2001) is a Fijian rugby sevens player. She was named in the Fijiana sevens team for the 2022 Commonwealth Games in Birmingham. She won a silver medal.
