= Brabantse Pijl =

Brabantse Pijl may refer to:

- Brabantse Pijl (men's race)
- Brabantse Pijl (women's race)
