= WXV Global Series =

Home-and-away women's rugby union series for national teams

- Upcoming season or competition: 2026 WXV Global Series
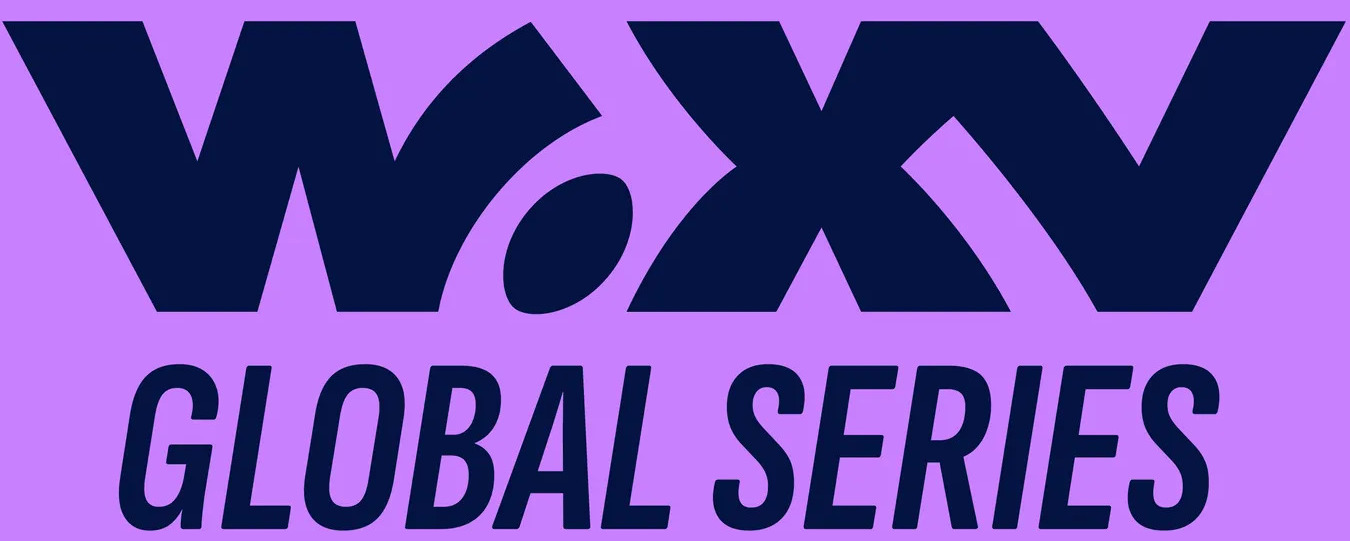
- Sport: Rugby union
- Founded: 2025; 1 year ago
- First season: 2026; 0 years ago
- No. of teams: 12
- Countries: Australia; Canada; England; France; Ireland; Italy; Japan; New Zealand; Scotland; South Africa; United States; Wales
- Website: wxvrugby.com

WXV Global Series is an international women's rugby union programme contested by the top 12 ranked national teams in the world. It was launched in September 2025 as one of two successors to WXV, alongside the WXV Global Series Challenger. The WXV Global Series uses a home-and-away, cross-regional touring model, with fixtures negotiated between member unions across an eight-week international window from September to October.

== History ==
In September 2025, World Rugby, in partnership with 18 national unions, announced a major restructure of WXV, launching the WXV Global Series and the WXV Global Series Challenger. The announcement was made during the 2025 Women's Rugby World Cup. The new format runs from 2026 to 2028 and is designed to provide women's national teams with a larger, more consistent schedule of international rugby, while also forming part of the qualification pathway for the 2029 Women's Rugby World Cup.

The rankings used to determine each team's position were set at the end of 2024 WXV, and teams remain fixed throughout the 2026–2028 cycle, as agreed with participating unions. As of April 2026, the 12 teams competing in the WXV Global Series occupy the top 12 places in the World Rugby Women's World Rankings. The six remaining teams compete in the secondary WXV Global Series Challenger, which uses a cross-pool format at a single centrally hosted venue, funded by World Rugby.

Participating unions retain domestic commercial rights to their home fixtures, allowing them to grow local fanbases and reinvest in player pathways and national programmes.

World Rugby has confirmed that the women's-specific size 4.5 ball trial, which began at the 2025–26 SVNS, will be extended to the 15-a-side game through the WXV Global Series.

=== Teams ===
The 12 teams that take part are: Australia, Canada, England, France, Ireland, Italy, Japan, New Zealand, Scotland, South Africa, the United States, and Wales.

== Format ==
The WXV Global Series is a home-and-away fixture programme in which the 12 teams play cross-regional tours arranged between member unions across an eight-week international window from the second week of September to the last week of October. Teams play between four and six fixtures in each year. Unions retain domestic commercial rights to their home fixtures.

In 2027, the structure will be adjusted to accommodate the 2027 British and Irish Lions Women's tour to New Zealand, with crossover fixtures scheduled between the Global Series and the Global Series Challenger.

The WXV Global Series operates on a fixed-membership basis for the 2026–2028 cycle, with no promotion or relegation between the Global Series and the WXV Global Series Challenger during this period.

== Calendar ==
The series runs in an eight-week international window from September to October in 2026, 2027 and 2028. Fixtures are negotiated directly between the member unions, with World Rugby setting the overall framework, competition rules, and broadcast arrangements.

== See also ==
- Nations Championship
