= ABC Metalworkers' Union =

Brazilian metalworkers' union located in São Bernardo do Campo, São Paulo, Brazil

- Sindicato dos Metalúrgicos do ABC
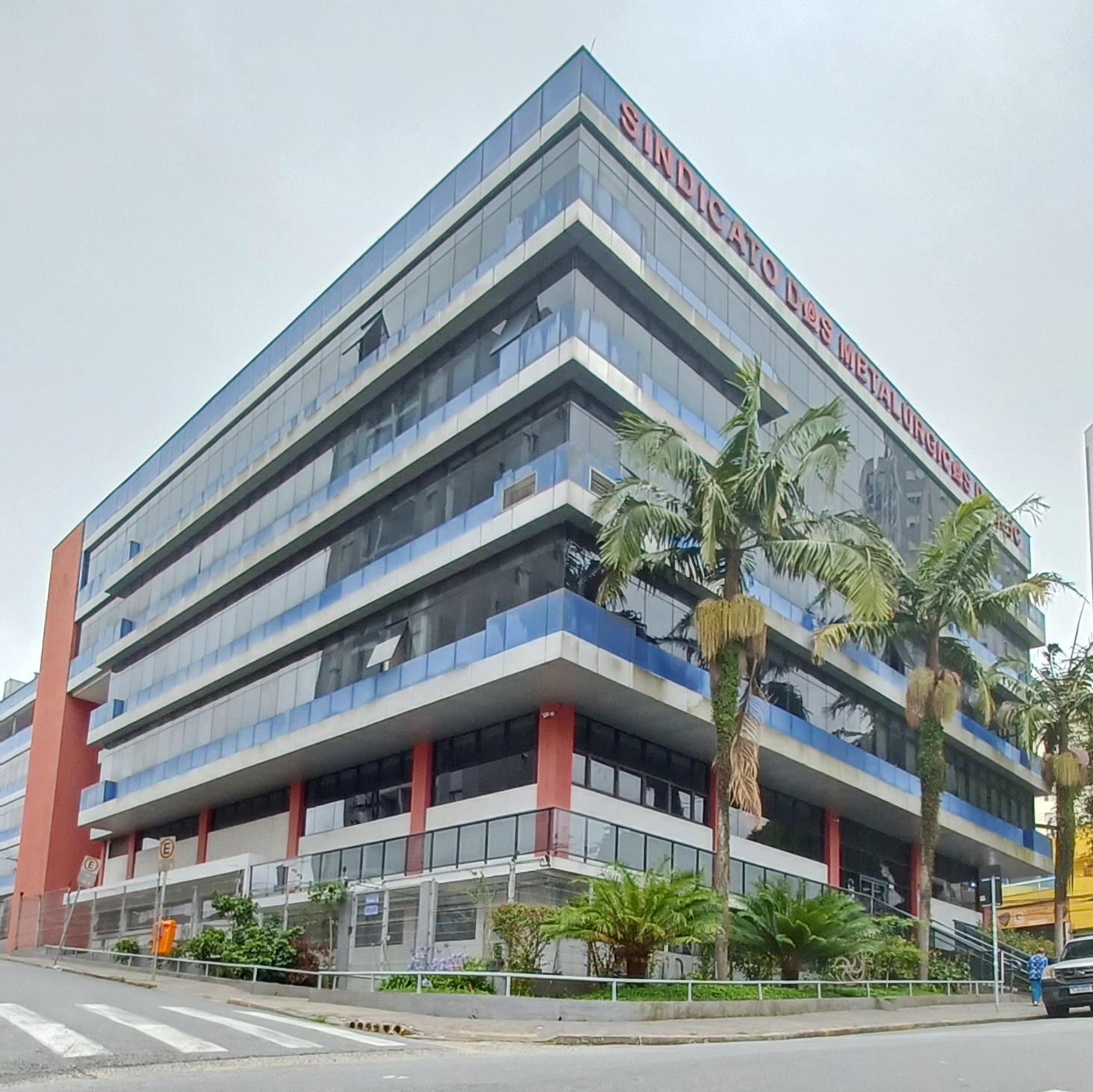
- Abbreviation: SMABC
- Formation: May 12, 1959; 67 years ago
- Founded at: São Bernardo do Campo, São Paulo, Brazil
- Type: Trade union
- Purpose: Representation and defense of metalworkers' rights
- Headquarters: São Bernardo do Campo, São Paulo
- Location: São Bernardo do Campo, Brazil
- Region served: São Bernardo do Campo, Daidema, Ribeirão Pires, and Rio Grande da Serra
- Official language: Portuguese
- President: Moisés Selerges Júnior
- Parent organization: Central Única dos Trabalhadores (CUT)
- Website: smabc.org.br
- Formerly called: Sindicato dos Metalúrgicos de São Bernardo do Campo e Diadema

The ABC Metalworkers' Union is a trade union in São Bernardo do Campo in the Brazilian state of São Paulo.

== History ==
In the region that corresponds to the current ABC region, in the metropolitan region of São Paulo, the first union to be organized under the rules established by the Getúlio Vargas government was the Union of Joiners, Carpenters, and Related Trades of São Bernardo do Campo.

Among the workers who were active in the newly formed union was Armando Mazzo, who would later be elected mayor of Santo André and impeached before taking office. The second union to be officially recognized was the metalworkers' union. Marcos Andreotti, one of the founders of the Workers' Union in São Bernardo in 1928, was elected president. Mazzo and Andreotti were among the main union leaders in the region before the emergence of Luiz Inácio Lula da Silva.

The São Bernardo Metalworkers' Union, founded in 1933, covered the entire region, as there was only the city of São Bernardo do Campo at that time. On May 12, 1959, the union was split into three new institutions, with headquarters in Santo André, São Bernardo do Campo, and São Caetano do Sul. At that time, the current union was named the Metalworkers' Union of São Bernardo do Campo and Diadema. In 1993, it merged with the Metalworkers' Union of Santo André, which gave rise to the union's current name, but this merger lasted only three years. Currently, the union operates in the São Paulo municipalities of São Bernardo do Campo, Diadema, Ribeirão Pires, and Rio Grande da Serra.

The ABC Union led important workers' strikes during the Brazilian military dictatorship. It is known for being the embryo of the Workers' Party (PT) and the Central Única dos Trabalhadores (CUT), and its former presidents include the current president of the Republic, Luiz Inácio Lula da Silva.

In 2010, during Lula's presidency, the union launched its own television station, TV dos Trabalhadores.

In April 2018, the ABC Metalworkers' Union, became the focal point for events related to the arrest of former President Luiz Inácio Lula da Silva. After Judge Sérgio Moro issued a preventive arrest warrant on April 5, Lula went to the union headquarters, where he remained for almost 48 hours, between Thursday night and Saturday. During this period, the site hosted vigils by supporters, political acts, and speeches, including speeches by the former president himself in front of the building. The union, historically linked to Lula's union and political career since the 1970s and 1980s, served as an initial point of resistance to the court order. In the late afternoon of April 7, Lula left the headquarters on foot, walked to a nearby area, and surrendered to the Federal Police (PF). He was later transferred to Curitiba, Paraná, to serve his sentence under Operation Car Wash.

== List of union presidents ==
Presidents of the ABC Metalworkers' Union:

- 1959–1963: Lino Ezelino Carniel
- 1963–1965: Anacleto Potomatti
- 1965–1967: Afonso Monteiro da Cruz
- 1969–1972: Paulo Vidal Neto
- 1972–1975: Paulo Vidal Neto
- 1975–1978: Luiz Inácio Lula da Silva
- 1978–1981: Luiz Inácio Lula da Silva
- 1981–1984: Jair Meneguelli
- 1984–1987: Jair Meneguelli
- 1987–1990: Vicente Paulo da Silva
- 1990–1993: Vicente Paulo da Silva
- 1993–1996: Vicente Paulo da Silva
- 1994–1996: Heiguiberto Guiba Della Bella Navarr
- 1996–1999: Luiz Marinho
- 1999–2002: Luiz Marinho
- 2002–2005: José Lopez Feijóo
- 2005–2008: José Lopez Feijóo
- 2008–2011: Sérgio Nobre
- 2011–2014: Sérgio Nobre
- 2014–2017: Rafael Marques
- 2017–2022: Wagner Santana
- 2022: Moisés Selerges

== See also ==
- 1978–1980 ABC Paulista strikes
- Diretas Já
- TV dos Trabalhadores
