= Imprisonment of Luiz Inácio Lula da Silva =

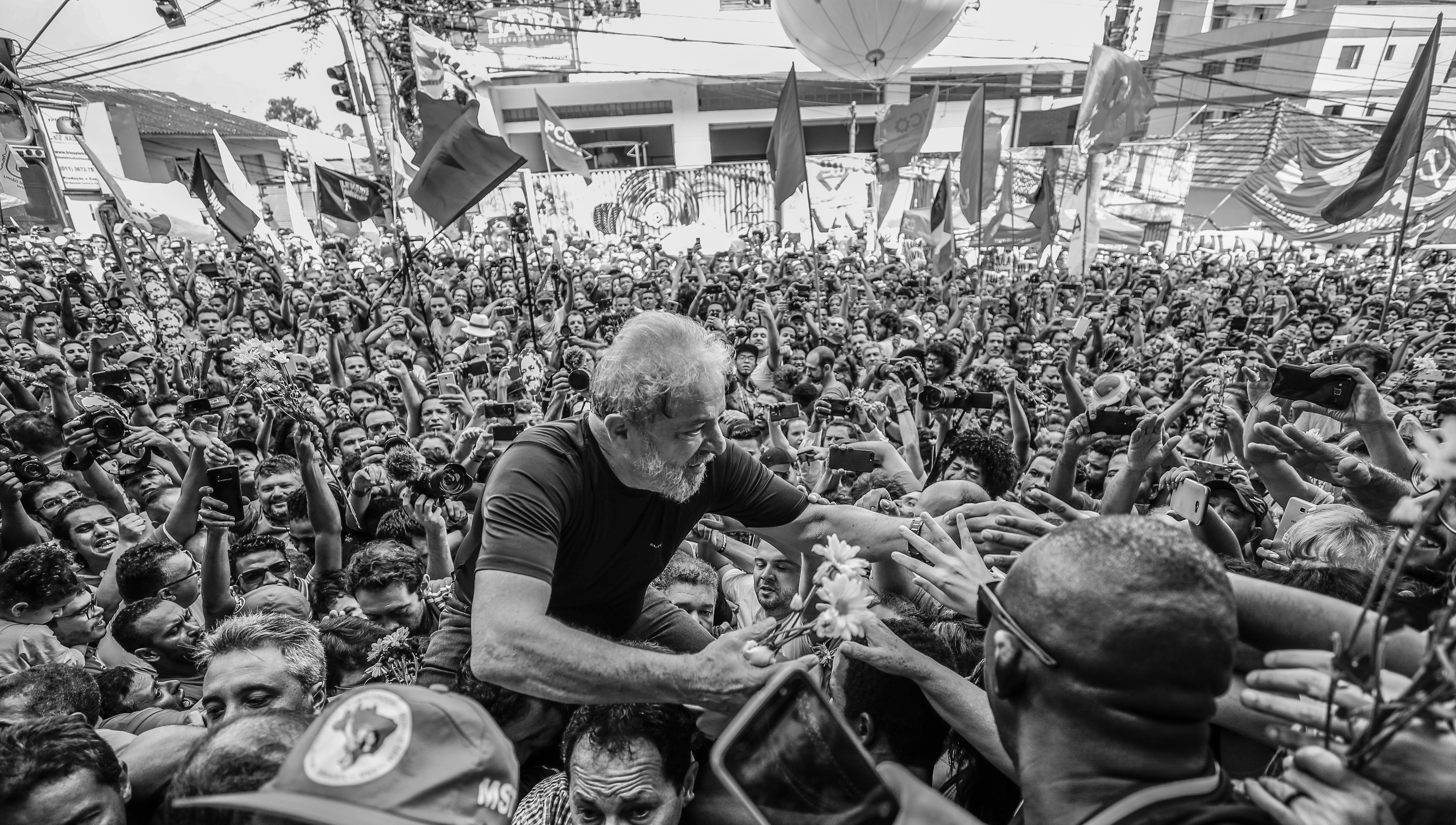
- Lula being carried by a crowd on the day of his arrest, before surrendering to the police
- Native name: Prisão de Luiz Inácio Lula da Silva
- English name: Imprisonment of Luiz Inácio Lula da Silva
- Date: 7 April 2018 – 8 November 2019
- Duration: 1 year, 7 months and 1 day (580 days)
- Venue: Superintendência Regional da Polícia Federal
- Location: Curitiba, Paraná, Brazil; 25°22′34″S 49°13′40″W
- Type: Imprisonment following conviction
- Cause: Convictions in Operation Car Wash corruption cases
- Outcome: Released on 8 November 2019 after Supreme Federal Court ruling against mandatory imprisonment before exhausted appeals; convictions annulled in 2021 due to jurisdictional bias
- Arrests: 1 (Lula surrendered voluntarily on 7 April 2018)
- Convicted: Luiz Inácio Lula da Silva
- Charges: Passive corruption and money laundering
- Sentence: 9 years and 6 months (first instance, 2017) * 12 years and 1 month (second instance, 2018) * 8 years and 10 months (after STJ decision, later annulled)
- Served at Federal Police headquarters in Curitiba; subject of international controversy and "Free Lula" movement

Luiz Inácio Lula da Silva, the 35th and 39th president of Brazil, was imprisoned at the ABC Metalworkers' Union in São Bernardo do Campo, in Greater São Paulo following his surrender to the Federal Police of Brazil (PF) on 7 April 2018 until the Supreme Federal Court (STF) overturned the arrest 8 November 2019.

On 8 March 2021, Justice Edson Fachin overturned Lula's convictions related to Operation Car Wash, ruling that the Federal Regional Court of the 4th Region had tried the case outside its jurisdiction. More than a year later, on 28 April 2022, the United Nations Human Rights Committee published the conclusion of an analysis in which it pointed out that Sergio Moro had been biased in the trial of the cases against Lula.

== Chronology ==
On 12 July 2017, Sergio Moro, then a federal judge of first instance, sentenced Luiz Inácio Lula da Silva to nine years and six months in prison for passive corruption and money laundering in a criminal case involving a triplex apartment in Guarujá, on the coast of the state of São Paulo. In the second instance, the sentence was increased to 12 years and one month, after a unanimous vote. Then, on April 5, Moro issued the arrest warrant. In April 2019, in a unanimous decision, the 5th Panel of the Superior Court of Justice (STJ) upheld Lula's conviction and reduced the sentence for passive corruption and money laundering from 12 years and one month to eight years and ten months in prison. The triplex case was investigated as part of Operation Car Wash. Lula served his sentence in Curitiba, capital of Paraná, in the building of the Regional Superintendency of the Federal Police in Paraná. In August 2018, the United Nations Human Rights Committee requested that Brazil guarantee Lula the right to exercise his political rights while in prison, including access to members of his party and the media and participation in the 2018 presidential election in Brazil. The Brazilian Foreign Ministry questioned the Committee and referred the decision to the Judiciary.

On 8 March 2021, Justice Edson Fachin overturned Lula's convictions related to Operation Car Wash, ruling that the Federal Regional Court of the 4th Region had tried the case outside its jurisdiction, based on a previous decision by the Second Panel of the Supreme Federal Court (STF) in the case of Transpetro, a Brazilian company linked to Petrobras, responsible for fuel transportation and logistics, which operates in the import and export of oil and oil products, gas, and ethanol. It was determined that the case should be tried in Brasília. As a result, Lula regained his political rights and the legal proceedings against him were transferred to the Federal Regional Court of the 1st Region. Subsequently, the Guarujá triplex case, which led to Lula's imprisonment, was dismissed by the court.

On 28 April 2022, the United Nations Human Rights Committee published the conclusion of an analysis in which it pointed out that Sergio Moro had been biased in the trial of the cases against Lula. According to the Committee's decision, Lula's political rights were violated in 2018 after he was prevented from participating in that year's presidential elections. The Committee determined that Brazil must present the measures adopted to repair the damage caused to the former president within 180 days and prevent other people from being targeted by similar proceedings in the future. Lula was the first former president of Brazil to be imprisoned for a conviction for a common crime. Before him, six other former presidents of the country were imprisoned: Hermes da Fonseca, Washington Luís, Artur Bernardes, Café Filho, Jânio Quadros, and Juscelino Kubitschek, all for explicit political reasons.

== Overview ==
=== List of criminal cases involving Lula ===
The triplex case was one of several cases in which Lula was involved. Lula was a defendant in ten criminal cases in total, including some in which he has already been acquitted or convicted. Some of these criminal cases are part of Operation Car Wash.

#	Judge	Reason / Charges	Date	Status / Outcome
1	Ricardo Leite	The judge accepted the complaint filed by the Federal Public Prosecutor's Office (MPF) and charged Lula with obstruction of justice. Also charged were former senator Delcídio do Amaral (independent-MS), Delcídio's former chief of staff Diogo Ferreira, banker André Esteves, lawyer Édson Ribeiro, cattle rancher José Carlos Bumlai, and his son, Maurício Bumlai. The former president was accused of trying to prevent former Petrobras director Nestor Cerveró from signing a plea bargain agreement.	29 July 2016	Acquitted
2	Sergio Moro	Accepted MPF complaint, making Lula a defendant for passive corruption and money laundering. Lula allegedly received over R$3 million in bribes from construction company OAS in the form of renovations to a triplex apartment in Guarujá, plus storage of personal goods.	20 September 2016	Convicted in three instances (initially 9 years and 6 months by Moro), but convictions annulled by the Supreme Federal Court (STF) due to lack of jurisdiction in Curitiba and partiality of Moro; case later archived in Brasília.
3	Vallisney de Souza Oliveira	He fully accepted the Federal Prosecutor's Office's complaint against former President Lula for the crimes of influence peddling, criminal organization, money laundering, and passive corruption in Operation Janus, which investigates suspicious business deals in Angola involving money from the Brazilian Development Bank (BNDES) funds.	13 October 2016	Acquitted on some charges; action later terminated/closed.
4	Vallisney de Souza Oliveira	Accepted MPF complaint in Zelotes operation, making Lula a defendant for influence peddling, money laundering, and criminal organization related to the purchase of 36 Swedish Gripen fighters and extension of tax incentives via Provisional Measure 627.	17 December 2016	Criminal action suspended.
5	Sergio Moro	A new complaint filed by the Car Wash task force against former President Lula has been accepted. With this decision, Lula becomes a defendant for the crimes of passive corruption and money laundering. He was accused of receiving kickbacks from Odebrecht for the purchase of an apartment in São Bernardo do Campo and another property in São Paulo. According to the indictment, this location was intended for the Lula Institute.	19 December 2016	Criminal action suspended.
6	Sergio Moro	He accepted another complaint against Lula, related to the case of a ranch in Atibaia, a city located in the interior of the state of São Paulo. Lula was accused of corruption and money laundering in the ranch case. According to the indictment, the former president benefited from R$1.02 million in renovations to the property, which was frequented by Lula and his family. The renovations were allegedly paid for by the contractors Odebrecht and OAS.	1 August 2017	Convicted in two instances, but the conviction was overturned and the complaint dismissed.
7	Vallisney de Souza Oliveira	Accused of selling provisional measures granting tax incentives to automakers during his presidency. The judge indicted him for passive corruption.	1 September 2017	Acquitted.
8	Vallisney de Souza Oliveira	He accepted a complaint filed by the Attorney General's Office in 2017 against Lula, initiating criminal proceedings and making him a defendant for the eighth time, in a case that became known as “Quadrilhão do PT” (PT Gang). Former President Dilma Rousseff also became a defendant, among others.	23 November 2018	Acquitted.
9	Federal Justice	Lula was accused of receiving one million reais, through a donation to the Lula Institute, to mediate discussions between the government of Equatorial Guinea and the Brazilian group ARG, with the aim of establishing the company in the country.	14 December 2018	Criminal proceedings closed.
10	Federal Court of São Paulo	Lula was accused of international influence peddling on behalf of the construction company OAS. The accusation stated that Lula had given a speech in Costa Rica in 2011 in order to influence the country's leaders to do business with OAS.	13 September 2021	Case archived.
Updated in January 2026. Most of the Car Wash cases involving Lula were overturned by the Supreme Court in 2021 due to jurisdictional issues and judicial bias; subsequent cases in Brasília or elsewhere resulted in acquittals, dismissals, or suspensions due to lack of evidence or procedural reasons.

== Background ==
In March 2010, Rio de Janeiro newspaper O Globo published a report about an apartment in the city of Guarujá, in the state of São Paulo, that allegedly belonged to then-President Lula. There were no suspicions of illegality at the time; the report focused on a multiple year delay in constructing the apartment complex, and its construction being taken over by Construtora OAS.

=== Operation Car Wash ===
In March 2014, an anti-corruption probe nicknamed Operation Car Wash (Operação Lava Jato) began; it would become the largest anti-corruption operation in the history of Brazil, revealing corruption and illegal payments in procurements of public works, many related to Petrobras. Several companies – Odebrecht, Camargo Corrêa, Construtora OAS, among others – were accused of bribing Petrobras employees and higher-ups to only choose their companies for Petrobras procurements; the companies would then decide, among themselves, on an overpriced invoice (Note: See superfaturar.) and pocket the difference. Those bribes were initially made in cash, but would later take the form of offshore transfers or the paying off of properties.

The investigation expanded through plea deals, such that over 200 arrests and 1 thousand search and seizure operations were made, recovering over R$4 billion in total (over US$1 billion).

=== Societal context ===
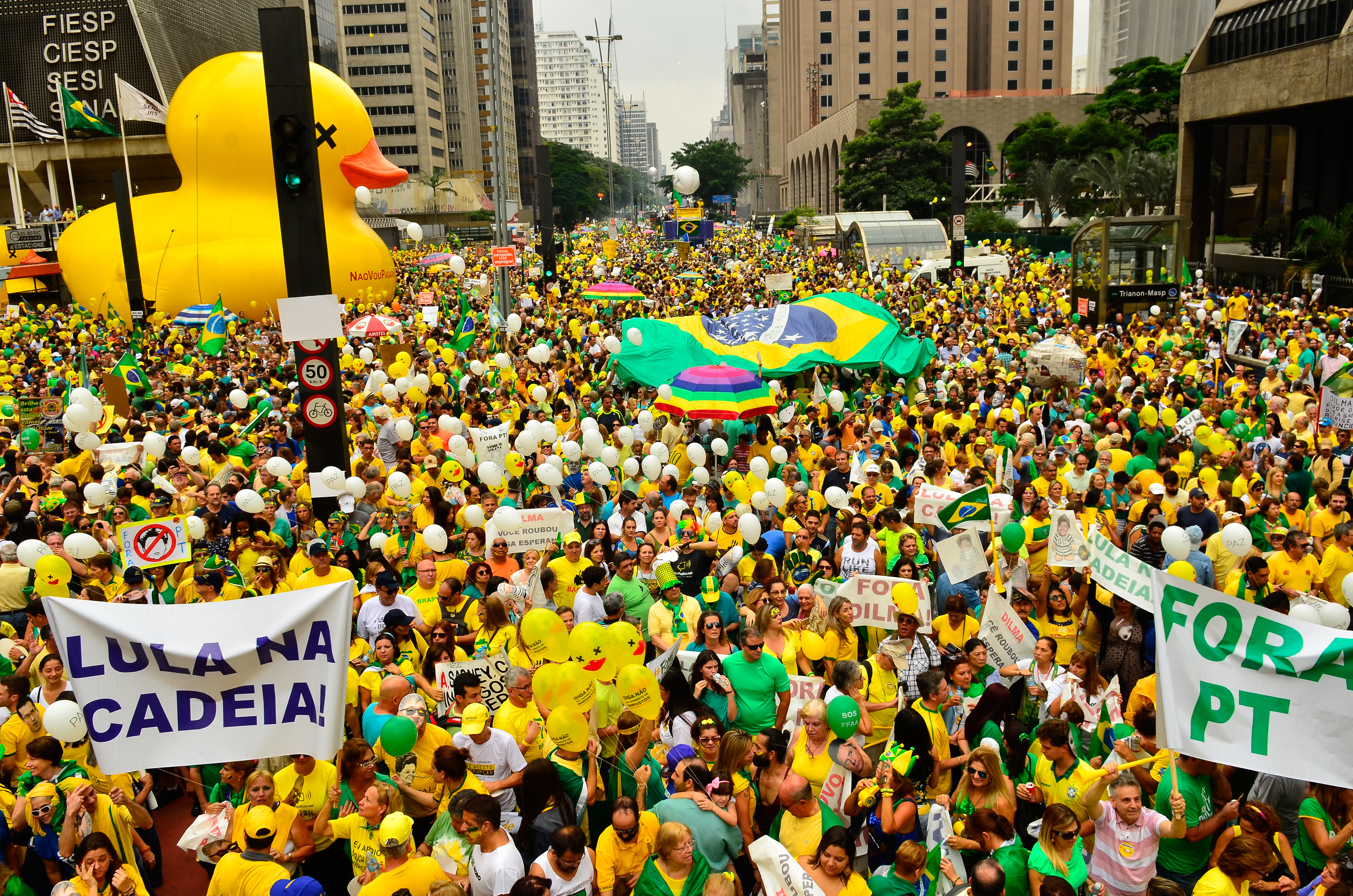
March 2016 protests in support of Sergio Moro, calling for Lula's arrest, the ousting of then-president Dilma Rousseff and the Workers' Party from power, and lower taxes

Operation Car Wash coincided with an explosive growth in what was termed "antipetismo" (an "anti-Workers' Party" sentiment) around 2014. This was motivated in part by a dissatisfaction with the economy: during the latest few years of a Worker's Party government, the Brazilian real had been losing strength in the USD exchange. In March 2015, for example, it hit a decade-long high, at USD$1 = R$3.16.

Protests broke out throughout the country calling for then-president Dilma Rousseff's removal from office, be it through an impeachment or military intervention, as part of a movement called "Vem pra Rua" (lit. 'Come to the Streets'). An April 2015 poll of protestors put over 90%, a majority of which were middle- and upper-class White Brazilians, believing the Workers' Party did a "great harm" to Brazil; and 37% believing minorities such as Afro-Brazilians, women and homosexuals had "too many rights" in Brazil.

=== Lula involvement ===
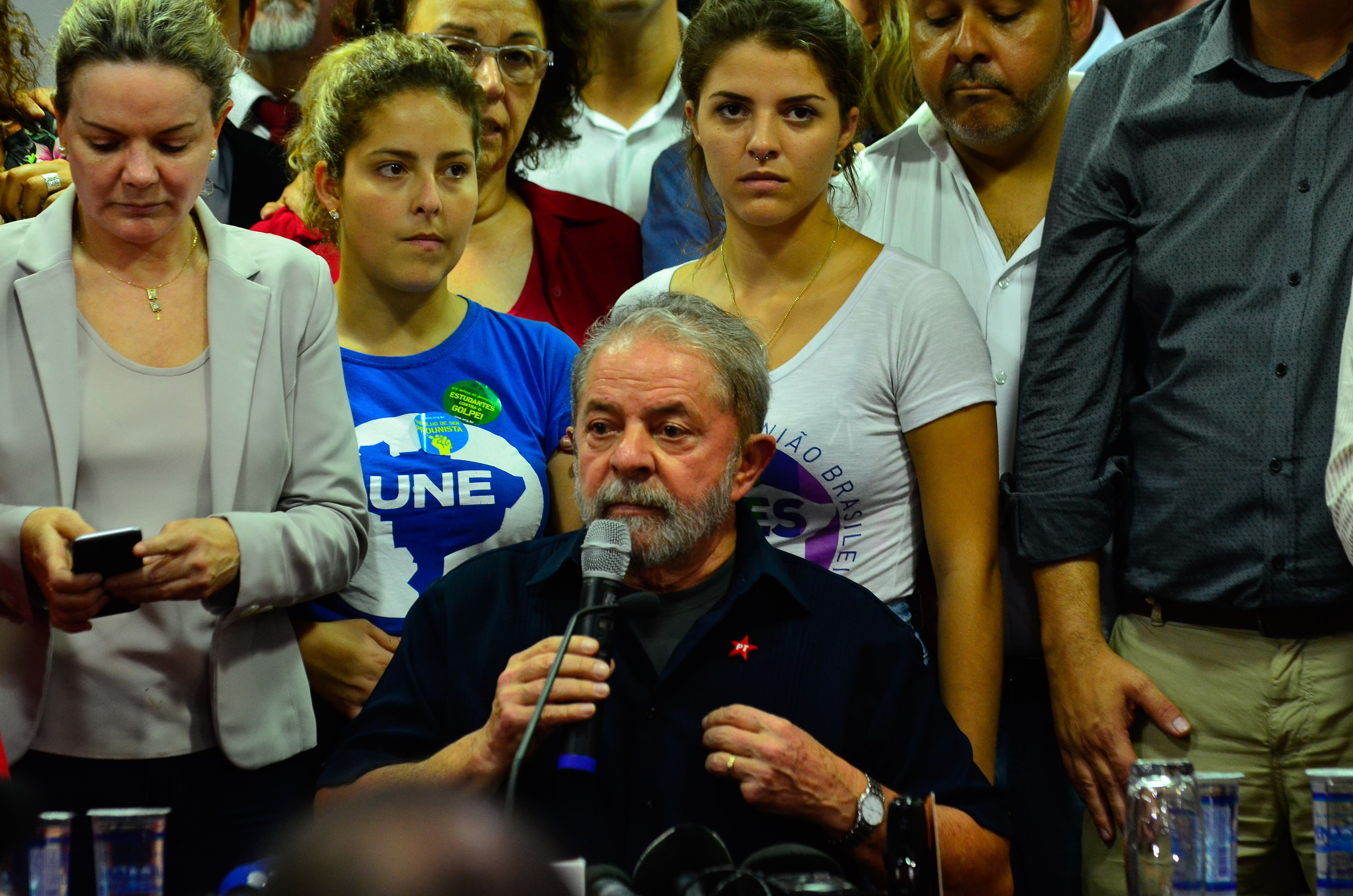
Lula speaking at press conference after returning from his coerced summons

In March 2016, Lula was the target of a coerced summons (condução coercitiva) (Note: Condução coercitiva, while not technically an arrest, is a police force-backed summons to testify.) to testify on suspicions of receiving bribes by Construtora OAS and Odebrecht in the form of renovations of an apartment in Guarujá and a country house (Note: The term in Brazilian Portuguese is sítio, which is something between a small farm, a rural retreat, a countryside estate or a ranch.) in Atibaia, both in the state of São Paulo. Lula was also under investigation for money received as donations and payments for lectures.

At the time, Lula criticized the coercion aspect of the summons, stating he wouldn't have refused to testify if asked. He also stated that were Federal Police to find a single real of his came from embezzlement, he didn't deserve to be a part of the Workers' Party. Lula further criticized that his lawyers were not informed of "anything", while some in the news media had prior knowledge of the intricacies of the investigation: "it's regretful that a portion of the Brazilian Judiciary is working in association with the press".

Lula also justified what was seen as suspiciously high prices for his lectures: "People wanted Lula to speak on the things he did in Brazil. The miracle he did to approve Prouni, Fies, to bring energy to 15 million of the poor in this country. That's why I became the most expensive speaker in the world, alongside Bill Clinton. [...] I don't have a mongrel complex. I know what I did for the country".

=== Accusation ===
A few days after his summons, São Paulo state's Public Prosecutor's Office (MP-SP) formally accused Lula and his wife, Marisa Letícia, of money laundering and concealment of assets. According to the prosecutors, Lula was the de facto owner of the Guarujá apartment (even if it was legally still property of the Construtora OAS company), which they argued constituted money laundering.

Crucially, the São Paulo state courts sent the accusation papers to the federal courts in Curitiba, in the state of Paraná, to be ruled on by Sergio Moro. At the time, there was already an open Supreme Federal Court case asking its deliberation on whether the prosecution would fall under the federal or São Paulo state jurisdictions.

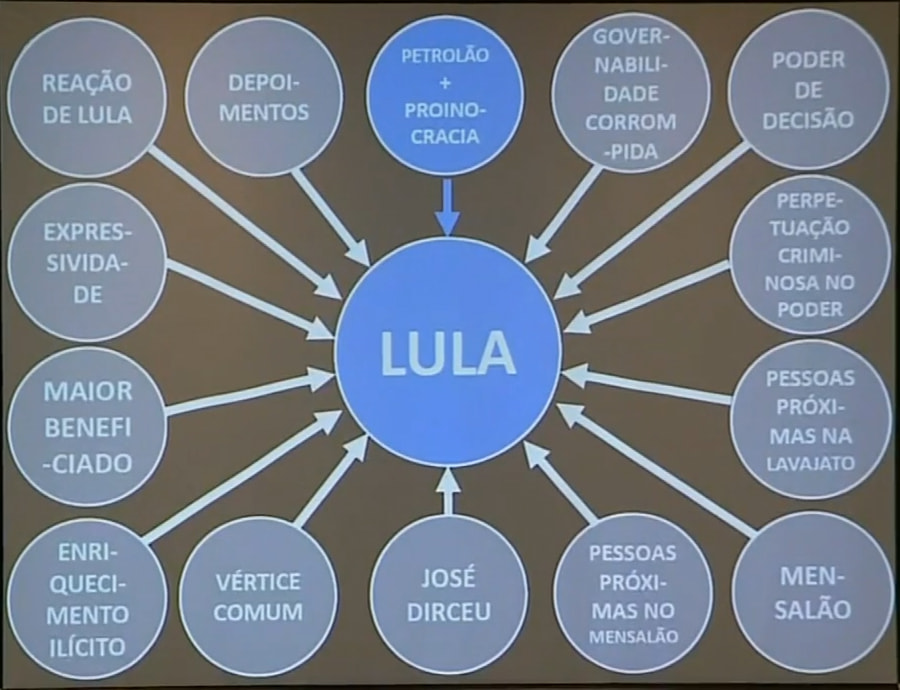
Federal prosecution presented a slide show to explain the September 2016 accusations against Lula; it quickly became viral online for its grammatical errors and absurdity.

Adding to the complaints, in September 2016, the Federal Public Prosecutor's Office accused Lula and seven other people of corruption and money laundering. According to the federal prosecutors, Lula was the "supreme commander" of the corruption scheme revealed by Operation Car Wash involving three contracts between Construtora OAS and Petrobras; Lula had allegedly received almost R$4 million in bribes, paid not in money but through renovations of the Guarujá apartment and the storage of personal items. A few days later, judge Sergio Moro accepted the Prosecutor's Office complaint, and Lula officially became a defendant in Operation Car Wash.

After being charged, Lula gave a speech: "I respect the institutions and respect the laws. I'll testify as many times as they want. [...] When I infringe on the law, punish me to make me an example. But when I don't, find someone else to mess with". Lula also praised the Transparency Portal and the Lei de Acesso à Informação (lit. 'Information Access Law'), created during his and Dilma's governments; and stated: "Prove I've been corrupt and I'll surrender by foot".

By May 2017, Lula was accused of a further 10 corruption and 44 money laundering cases relating to renovations of a country house in Atibaia; though it was not owned by Lula, the prosecution argued the renovations were bribes in his benefit by the companies Odebrecht, Construtora OAS e Schahin.

Lula's lawyers filed a lawsuit against prosecutor Deltan Dallagnol, seeking compensation for moral damages for the press conference given by Dallagnol in 2016 in which he used a Microsoft PowerPoint presentation to explain the charges against Lula. Initially, Dallagnol was acquitted in the first and second instances, but when the case reached the Superior Court of Justice (STJ), the court ordered Dallagnol to pay Lula 146,000 reais in damages. The ministers of the fourth panel of the STJ considered that Deltan Dallagnol exceeded the limits of his duties as a prosecutor by using language that discredited Lula's honor and image at the press conference, in addition to using non-technical language. The STJ ministers also considered that Dallagnol attributed to Lula facts that were not included in the complaint in the triplex case, as explained during the press conference. The Supreme Federal Court upheld the STJ's ruling, ordering Dallagnol to pay damages to Lula.

=== Defense ===
In 2016, Lula's defense team submitted a request to the United Nations (UN) to assess possible violations in the legal proceedings involving Lula under the International Covenant on Civil and Political Rights, to which Brazil is a signatory. In May 2018, the organization's Human Rights Committee stated that it would not take a final position until 2019, but denied precautionary measures against the former president's imprisonment.

=== Testimonials ===
On 20 April 2017, former OAS president Léo Pinheiro testified before Judge Sergio Moro, saying that the triplex did indeed belong to Lula and that the apartment had never been put up for sale by OAS because it was reserved for the former president. He also said that Lula himself had approved the design of the triplex and the ranch in Atibaia, which was investigated in another case. Lula's defense claimed that Léo Pinheiro was lying in order to try to secure a plea bargain. About a year earlier, the newspaper Folha de S.Paulo reported that Léo Pinheiro had told another version of the story, in which he exonerated Lula, but prosecutors considered this version implausible.

On 10 May 2017, Lula gave his testimony to Judge Sergio Moro about the triplex case. During the interrogation, which lasted almost five hours, the former president denied owning the apartment and said he never intended to purchase it. Lula said he only visited the triplex once to see what it was like and did not want to buy it. He also said that his wife, Marisa Letícia Lula da Silva, was interested in the property and that she had tried to purchase the apartment without telling him about it. The testimony had a major impact in Brazil and in the international press. In Curitiba, where the testimony was given, protesters held demonstrations for and against the former president throughout the day.

== Convictions ==
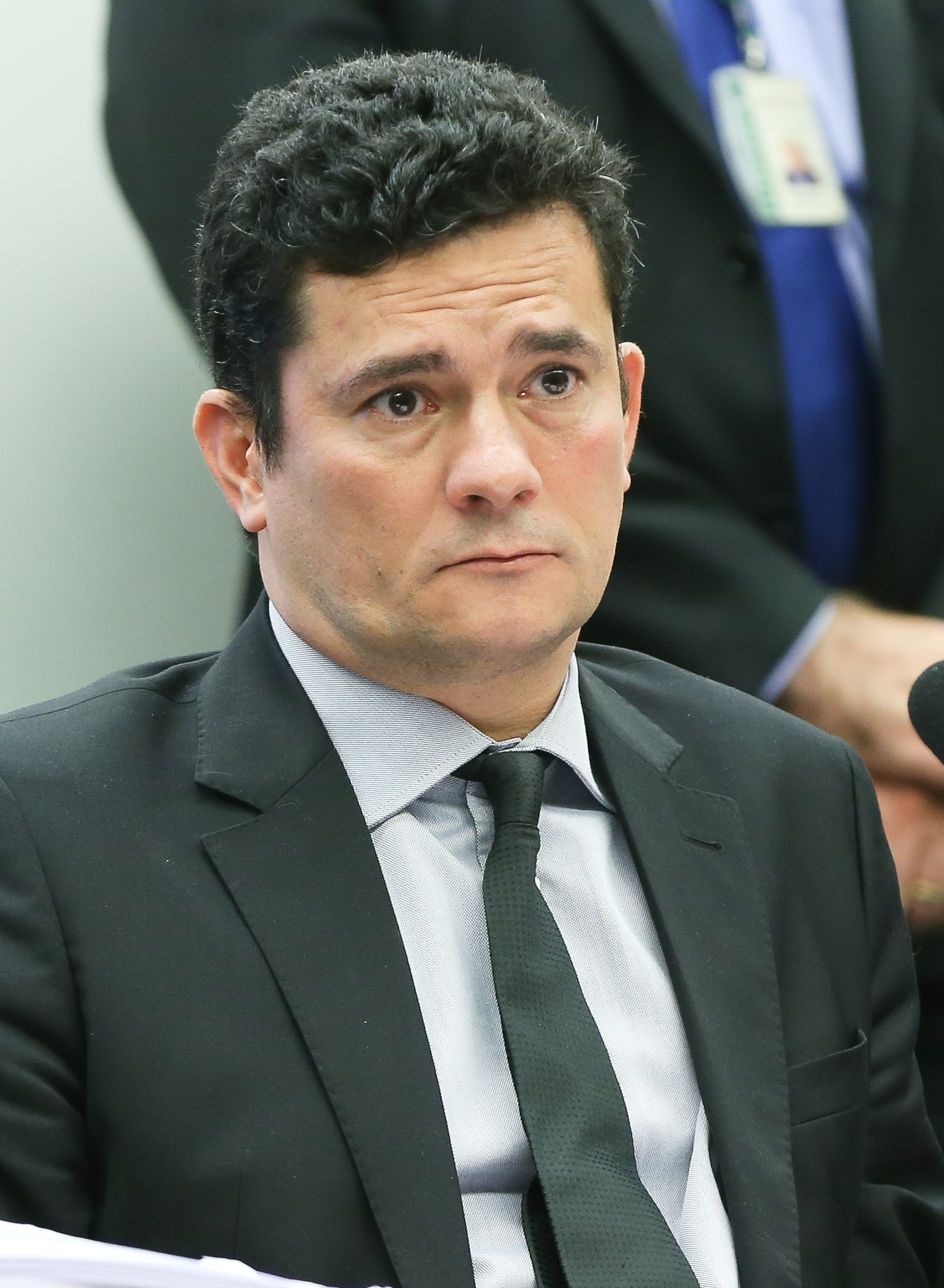
Sergio Moro, former judge in the Lava Jato investigation, who would later become Minister of Justice in the Bolsonaro administration.

On 12 July 2017, federal judge Sergio Moro sentenced former president Luiz Inácio Lula da Silva to nine years and six months in prison in the criminal case involving the triplex apartment, for the crimes of passive corruption and money laundering. The indictment referred to the concealment of ownership of a triplex penthouse in Guarujá, on the coast of São Paulo, received as a bribe from the construction company OAS in exchange for favors at Petrobras. Three months later, Lula gave a new statement to Sergio Moro, this time in a case involving the Lula Institute. During the testimony, Lula questioned Moro and said that he had not been judged impartially by him in the triplex case. Moro declined to comment and simply told Lula to question the triplex case in the court of appeals.

=== Appeal court ===
On 24 January 2018, in a trial that lasted more than eight hours and received international attention, Luiz Inácio Lula da Silva was convicted in the second instance. The sentence was unanimous among the three judges of the 8th Panel of the Federal Regional Court of the 4th Region (TRF-4), in Porto Alegre, in favor of upholding the previous conviction, which was 9 years and 6 months in prison for passive corruption and money laundering, and further extending the former president's prison sentence for passive corruption and money laundering in the case of the triplex apartment in Guarujá. The judges decided to extend the sentence to 12 years and 1 month in prison, to be served in a closed regime. The conclusions were that Lula received a bribe from a corruption scheme at Petrobras and that this bribe was delivered in the form of an apartment. The sentence would begin after all possible appeals within the TRF-4 itself had been exhausted. Even though he was convicted, he did not immediately lose the right to run in the 2018 elections, a decision that would be up to the Superior Electoral Court (TSE). Lula's defense team and politicians close to him questioned the speed with which his case was processed in the TRF-4. The then president of the court, Thompson Flores, responded that speed is “a common feature of this court” and that “the time taken to process the appeal does not violate the principle of equality.”

==== Evidences ====
According to the judge in charge of the case, João Pedro Gebran Neto, the evidence of Lula's involvement in passive corruption and money laundering in the Guarujá triplex case includes:

- Testimony from Leo Pinheiro, former president of OAS, and Agenor Franklin Magalhães Medeiros, director of OAS's Oil and Gas division, both defendants in the case;
- Private text messages from Leo Pinheiro referring to a project headed by a "boss" and a "madam", who were, respectively, Lula and his wife Marisa Letícia;
- Testimony from OAS employees and contractors hired to renovate the property, as well as from an employee of the Solaris building, regarding the construction work and the couple's visits to the triplex;
- Documents with erasures regarding a property in Guarujá, found at Lula's home and at Bancoop;
- Testimony from whistleblowers in the Lava Jato investigation, such as Alberto Youssef, Nestor Cerveró, and Paulo Roberto Costa, consistent with Leo Pinheiro's statements about corruption at Petrobras;

According to Gebran, the evidence that the apartment "was intended for Lula as a benefit" was "beyond reasonable doubt" and Lula was aware of what was happening, being a "guarantor of a larger scheme" and "acting behind the scenes", influencing Petrobras appointments. Gebran also rejected Lula's defense claim that there was no official act by the former president, citing votes from the Mensalão trial, and rejected the defense's appeal that the 13th Federal Court, presided over by Judge Sergio Moro, lacked jurisdiction to hear the case.

However, some analysts disagreed with the evidence presented, saying that it was more indicative of a possible crime than concrete proof, which would weaken the conviction. The former Minister of National Integration and 2018 presidential candidate, Ciro Gomes, took the same line and said that Lula was convicted based on "circumstantial evidence". Other analysts argued that the Guarujá triplex was indeed intended for Lula, but that it was not clear in the ruling what act of corruption he had committed. Journalist Reinaldo Azevedo, former columnist for Veja magazine and vocal critic of the Workers' Party (PT), defended Lula against Moro's accusations, stating that a reading of the case reveals the absence of such solid evidence, with the Federal Public Prosecutor's Office's complaint being ignored in crucial parts and the court decision resorting to broad and politicized interpretations, which would constitute a violation of the principle of presumption of innocence and due process of law.

==== Preventive habeas corpus ====
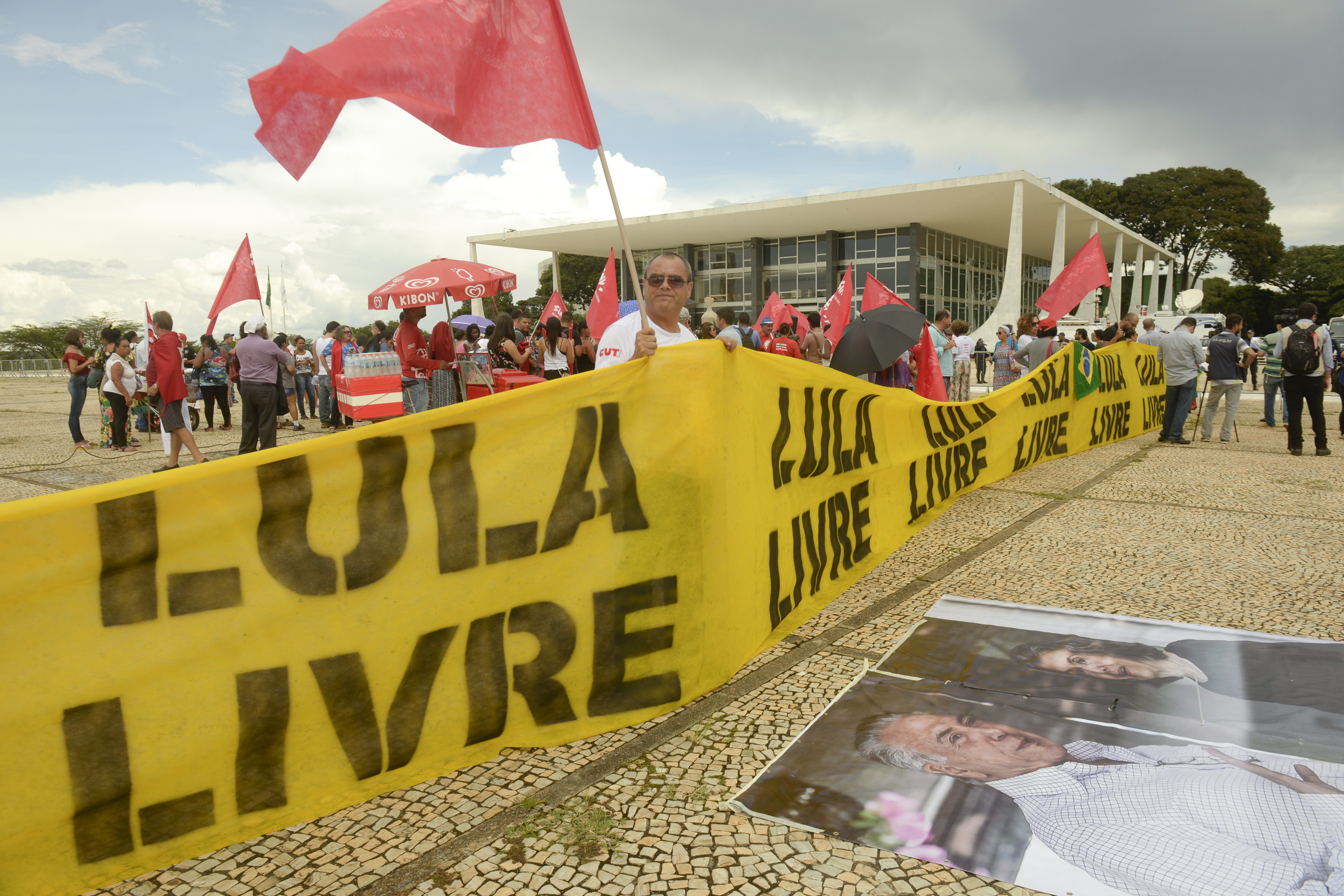
Demonstration on March 22 in front of the Supreme Court for habeas corpus.

After Lula's conviction in the second instance, the former president's defense team filed preventive habeas corpus petitions with the Superior Court of Justice and the Supreme Court in an attempt to prevent his imprisonment.

On 6 March 2018, the Superior Court of Justice unanimously rejected Lula's habeas corpus petition by a vote of 5 to 0.

Eduardo Villas Boas
(@Gen_VillasBoas)
tweeted:

Nessa situação que vive o Brasil, resta perguntar às instituições e ao povo quem realmente está pensando no bem do País e das gerações futuras e quem está preocupado apenas com interesses pessoais?

Translation:

In the current situation in Brazil, we must ask the institutions and the people: who is truly thinking about the good of the country and future generations, and who is only concerned with personal interests?

3 April 2018

Eduardo Villas Boas
(@Gen_VillasBoas)
tweeted:

Asseguro à Nação que o Exército Brasileiro julga compartilhar o anseio de todos os cidadãos de bem de repúdio à impunidade e de respeito à Constituição, à paz social e à Democracia, bem como se mantém atento às suas missões institucionais.

Translation:

I assure the nation that the Brazilian Army shares the desire of all law-abiding citizens to reject impunity and respect the Constitution, social peace, and democracy, while remaining attentive to its institutional missions.

3 April 2018

On 22 March 2018, the STF accepted a request from the defense and granted the former president safe conduct—preventing Lula's arrest until the final ruling on the habeas corpus petition by the court itself on April 4. According to the STF's understanding of imprisonment in the second instance, the Federal Regional Court of the 4th Region could issue an arrest warrant against the former president after the last appeal was heard in court on March 26, 2018. However, the “Lula principle,” as it became known, prevented the TRF-4 from enforcing the prison sentence. The Supreme Court's decision was criticized by federal prosecutors and prosecutors from the Car Wash task force. On the night of 3 April, the then commander of the Brazilian Army (EB), General Eduardo Villas Bôas, posted two messages on his Twitter profile that were understood as a threat to the STF not to grant Lula's habeas corpus petition. The following day, 4 April 2018, the Supreme Court, by a vote of 6 to 5, rejected Lula's habeas corpus petition, which would have allowed the former president to await his appeals in freedom after his conviction in the second instance. Justice Rosa Weber's vote was decisive in the rejection.

Votes of the Supreme Court justices regarding Lula's preventive habeas corpus
Against granting Habeas Corpus	In favor of granting Habeas Corpus	Ref
Edson Fachin	Gilmar Mendes	
Alexandre de Moraes	Dias Toffoli	
Luís Roberto Barroso	Ricardo Lewandowski	
Rosa Weber	Marco Aurélio Mello	
Luiz Fux	José Celso de Mello Filho	
Cármen Lúcia		

== Prison ==
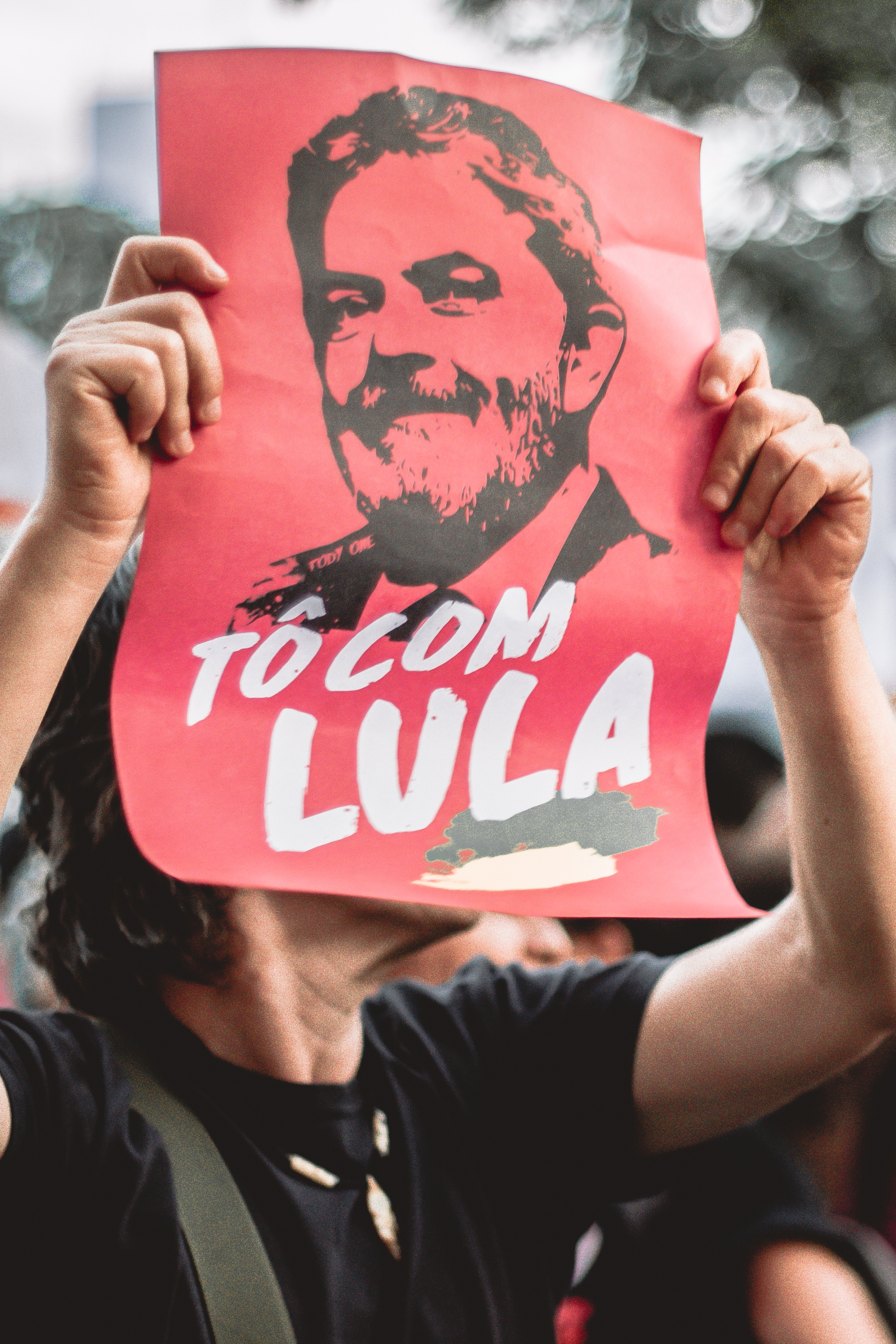
Protestor holding a pro-Lula sign at a rally for the former president's freedom in Montes Claros, Minas Gerais.

On 5 April 2018, after the Federal Supreme Court rejected the preventive habeas corpus, Federal Judge Sergio Moro ordered the imprisonment of Lula, who had been sentenced by the Federal Regional Court of the 4th Region (TRF-4) to 12 years and one month of imprisonment. The judge also defined special conditions for imprisonment due to the dignity of the office. According to the order, a reserved room was prepared at the Federal Police (PF) headquarters, where the former president would be separated from other prisoners, without any risk to his moral or physical integrity. Moro also gave Lula a deadline to surrender to the Federal Police in Curitiba: by 5 p.m. on April 6. Experts said at the time that Moro's arrest warrant against Lula had atypical characteristics. The former president's defense filed a new habeas corpus petition with the Superior Court of Justice to avoid his arrest, which was again denied.

Lula decided not to report to the Federal Police headquarters in Curitiba, and refused to leave the ABC Metalworkers' Union on April 6, 2018, when the arrest warrant issued by Moro for the former president expired. The Federal Police planned Lula's transportation in case he wanted to turn himself in at either the Federal Police headquarters in São Paulo or Curitiba.

As Lula did not turn himself in by the deadline, rumors began to circulate that he could be placed in preventive detention. After that, Lula decided to leave the union and turn himself in to the Federal Police the following day, 7 April, after a Catholic mass in honor of Marisa Letícia, who had died in February 2017.

On the morning of 7 April, Supreme Court Justice Edson Fachin denied yet another habeas corpus petition to prevent the former president's arrest. Before leaving, Lula declared in a speech at the site that he intended to turn himself in to prove his innocence and avoid being considered a fugitive. He also said that he was not afraid of Moro, that the real reason for his arrest was his social policy, and concluded by stating that his legacy would continue after his imprisonment, as his ideas were still alive: “The more they attack me, the more my relationship with the Brazilian people grows,” he added.

Finally, on 7 April 2018, Lula surrendered to the Federal Police, who were waiting for him outside the union headquarters, after attempting to leave and being prevented from doing so by activists on several occasions. From there, he was taken to Curitiba in a small aircraft. Upon arriving in the capital of Paraná, he was taken by helicopter to his cell, a room at the Federal Police headquarters. By order of federal judge Sergio Moro, responsible for the Car Wash Operation cases in the lower court, the former president was imprisoned in a special 15-square-meter room. The space is located on the fourth floor of the Federal Police building and has a bed, desk, and private bathroom. A television was also authorized to be installed on site. Lula's imprisonment gave rise to the Free Lula movement.

=== Subsequent events ===
On 11 April 2018, the Union of Federal Police Delegates of the State of Paraná (SinDPF/PR) requested, through an official letter sent to the Superintendence of the Federal Police, the transfer of former President Lula to a location that would offer better security conditions and that would not cause inconvenience or risks to the population and Federal Police employees. According to the union, the location where the former president was being held was used to provide services to the general public, such as issuing passports and criminal records. “Thus, every day, hundreds of people who visit these facilities need, for various and relevant reasons, security and efficiency in service,” said the union.

On 10 May 2018, the second panel of the STF unanimously denied the former president's request for release in the virtual trial. On May 15, STJ Minister Felix Fischer rejected a new habeas corpus petition filed by Lula's defense team. On the same day, the triplex apartment in Guarujá attributed to Lula was sold at auction for 2.2 million reais.

On 11 July 2018, the president of the STJ, Laurita Vaz, denied 143 requests for Lula's release. These requests were not made by the former president's defense team, but by ordinary citizens.

On 1 November 2018, shortly after the presidential elections, then-judge Sérgio Moro accepted an invitation from President-elect Jair Bolsonaro to serve as his Minister of Justice in the new administration. To take up the position of Minister of Justice, Moro stepped down as judge of Operation Car Wash. Lula's defense filed a habeas corpus petition with the Supreme Court questioning the act. In the petition, the defense argued that Moro's acceptance of the position of Minister of Justice under Bolsonaro demonstrated that the former judge had not acted impartially in Lula's case.

On 19 December 2018, Supreme Court Justice Marco Aurélio Mello granted an injunction ordering that all prisoners convicted in the second instance and with appeals pending in court should be released. The measure could have freed Lula from prison, and on the same day, the former president's defense team requested his release. However, on the same day, the president of the STF, Dias Toffoli, suspended the injunction. Toffoli argued that the issue of imprisonment after conviction in the second instance should be analyzed by the full STF in a session scheduled for 2019.

On 29 January 2019, Lula's brother, Genival Inácio da Silva, known as Vavá, died of cancer, and the former president requested permission to attend the funeral and speak with family members. Initially, federal judge Carolina Lebbos and TRF-4 judge Leandro Palsen denied permission to attend the funeral, but then STF President Dias Toffoli authorized Lula to leave prison to attend the ceremony and meet with his family. Despite the favorable decision, when Toffoli's authorization was issued, Vavá's body had already been buried. For this reason, Lula chose not to meet with his family and did not leave prison.

On 21 February 2019, Supreme Court Justice Edson Fachin denied yet another request for Lula's release.

On 1 March 2019, federal judge Carolina Lebbos authorized Lula's release from prison to travel to São Bernardo do Campo, where he attended the funeral of his grandson, Arthur Araújo Lula da Silva, who died at the age of seven. Initially, it was reported that Arthur had died of meningitis, but medical tests confirmed that the cause of death was not meningitis, but rather a generalized infection. After the ceremony, Lula returned to the Federal Police headquarters in Curitiba.

On 10 May 2019, the former president's defense team requested that the STJ allow Lula to serve the remainder of his sentence under open conditions. On June 4, 2019, the Federal Public Prosecutor's Office sent an opinion to the STJ, saying that Lula could serve the remainder of his sentence under a semi-open regime. But on 23 September 2019, Lula declared, through a statement released by his lawyers, that he had decided not to request a change in his prison regime.

On 25 June 2019, the second panel of the STF denied, by a vote of 4 to 1, another request for release made by Lula's defense team.

On 7 August 2019, Carolina Lebbos authorized Lula's transfer to a prison in São Paulo. On the same day, Judge Paulo Eduardo de Almeida Sorci, of the São Paulo state court, ruled that Lula should remain in the Tremembé prison, in the interior of São Paulo. Hours later, the former president's defense team appealed to the STF against the transfer. The Supreme Court, by a vote of 10 to 1, suspended Lula's transfer to São Paulo until the Court could review a request for the former president's release. In the request, the defense questioned the impartiality of Sergio Moro, who convicted Lula in the lower court.

=== Subsequent convictions ===
==== Third instance ====
In November 2018, when Lula was already in prison, the appeal filed by his lawyers against his conviction in the Guarujá triplex case reached the Superior Court of Justice (STJ). The defense alleged that there had been several violations of rights during the proceedings and requested Lula's acquittal or the annulment of his conviction. Justice Felix Fischer initially denied this request. The defense then appealed to the Fifth Panel of the STJ.

On 23 April 2019, the Fifth Panel reviewed the appeal and, by unanimous decision, upheld Lula's conviction in the triplex case. However, the justices reduced the sentence to 8 years, 10 months, and 20 days in prison, in addition to reducing the amount of the fine that the former president would have to pay as compensation. Justices Felix Fischer, Jorge Mussi, Reynaldo Soares da Fonseca, and Ribeiro Dantas participated in the trial. Justice Joel Ilan Paciornik did not participate in the decision because he recused himself.

==== Farm in Atibaia ====
On 6 February 2019, Lula was sentenced by Judge Gabriela Hardt, Moro's replacement, to 12 years and 11 months in prison in another case involving a ranch in the city of Atibaia, in the interior of São Paulo. In that case, Lula was accused of receiving kickbacks from OAS and Odebrecht through renovations to the ranch. On 27 November 2019, the Federal Regional Court of the 4th Region (TRF-4) in Porto Alegre ruled on Lula's appeal in the second instance and unanimously upheld the conviction in the ranch case and increased the sentence to 17 years, one month, and 10 days in prison. The former president's defense considered the conviction unfair and arbitrary. In an appeal, it said that the proceedings and the merits of the case had not been resolved, as the conviction stated that Lula had been convicted on the basis of the assertion that he "was the main orchestrator...of a corruption scheme... at Petrobras," contradicting the final ruling handed down by the 12th Federal Court of Brasília, which acquitted the former president of this conviction. The defense also complained that Gabriela Hardt copied parts of Sergio Moro's ruling in the Guarujá triplex case to convict Lula in the Atibaia ranch case. Hardt admitted that he used the triplex sentence as a model, but denied any injustice, claiming that it is common for judges to use other sentences as models and that, despite having used the triplex sentence as a model, the reasoning is different. On 13 November 2019, the TRF-4 overturned another ruling by Gabriela Hardt (unrelated to Lula) on the grounds that the judge had copied the ruling.

=== Appearances after arrest ===
While in prison, Lula was seen in public on few occasions. His first public appearance after his arrest was on June 5, 2018, when the former president testified before Judge Marcelo Bretas in a criminal case investigating alleged vote buying for the selection of Rio de Janeiro as the host city for the 2016 Summer Olympics. Lula testified via videoconference. The second appearance was on 14 November 2018, when the former president testified before Judge Gabriela Hardt in the case involving the ranch in Atibaia. Lula was temporarily released from prison in Curitiba to testify. The third appearance was on 1 March 2019, when Lula was allowed to attend his grandson's funeral in São Bernardo do Campo. During the ceremony, Lula only spoke in an area reserved for family and friends. According to people present at the scene, Lula promised his grandson that he would prove his innocence. The fourth appearance was on 26 April 2019, when the former president gave his first interview in prison to the newspapers Folha de S.Paulo and El País. The fifth appearance was on 10 May 2019, when Lula's second interview in prison, conducted for the BBC, was aired. On 15 May 2019, Lula gave his third interview in prison, this time to journalist Glenn Greenwald of The Intercept Brasil. The interview was made available in full on the internet on 21 May 2019. After that, for the rest of his time in prison, Lula appeared only in interviews he gave in prison.

=== Interview requests ===
On 11 July 2018, Judge Carolina Moura Lebbos, responsible for enforcing Lula's sentence, denied a request by media outlets to interview him in prison. Among the outlets that made the request were UOL, Folha de S.Paulo, SBT, Rede TV!, and Diário do Centro do Mundo. Journalists Mônica Bergamo, from Folha de S.Paulo, and Florestan Fernandes Júnior, from El País, filed a constitutional complaint with the Federal Supreme Court against Judge Lebbos' decision. On the morning of 28 September 2018, Supreme Court Justice Ricardo Lewandowski authorized Lula to give interviews in prison. Hours later, however, the New Party requested the suspension of the injunction, and Supreme Court Justice Luiz Fux suspended Lewandowski's decision and prohibited Lula from giving an interview to Folha de S.Paulo. If the interview had already been conducted, it could not be published. The New Party also filed a lawsuit to prevent El País from interviewing Lula. On 1 October 2018, Lewandowski reaffirmed his decision, but the president of the STF, Dias Toffoli, decided to uphold Fux's decision. Fux's decision was criticized by lawyers.

Two days later, Ricardo Lewandowski once again authorized Lula to give interviews in prison. On the same day, Dias Toffoli overturned the decision again and kept Lula banned from giving interviews from prison, but warned that the matter could be brought before the full Supreme Court at a later date. On 4 December 2018, Lewandowski asked Toffoli to authorize Lula to give interviews, since the argument for the ban was that the former president's interviews could influence the 2018 electoral process, but that risk no longer existed because the elections had already been held. On 18 April 2019, Dias Toffoli revoked Fux's decision and authorized Lula to give interviews in prison. On 26 April 2019, Lula gave his first interview in prison to the newspapers Folha de S.Paulo and El País.

==== Interviews granted by Lula in prison ====
After Folha and El País won their court case, Lula gave several other interviews during his period of restricted freedom. Below are all the interviews given by the former president during this period:

Number	Date	Interviewer(s)	Site/Journal/Network	Ref.
1	26/04/19	Florestan Fernandes Júnior (El País), Mônica Bergamo (Folha de S.Paulo)	El País and Folha de S.Paulo	
2	03/05/19	Kennedy Alencar	BBC	
3	15/05/19	Glenn Greenwald	The Intercept Brasil	
4	15/05/19	Jens Glüsing	Der Spiegel (audio/video not published)	
5	05/06/19	Eleonora de Lucena and Joaquim de Carvalho	Diário do Centro do Mundo and Tutaméia	
6	12/06/19	Juca Kfouri and José Trajano	Rede TVT	
7	03/07/19	Marco Weissheimer	Sul21	
8	14/08/19	Bob Fernandes	TV Educativa da Bahia	
9	21/08/19	Mauro Lopes, Paulo Moreira Leite and, Pepe Escobar	TV 247 (Brasil 247)	
10	28/08/19	Mariana Schreiber	BBC Brasil	
11	04/09/19	Mino Carta	Carta Capital	
12	11/09/19	Nicolás Trotta and Gisela Marziotta	Página/12	
13	18/09/19	Renato Rovai	Fórum	
14	18/09/19	Haroldo Ceravolo Sereza	Opera Mundi	
15	25/09/19	Luiz Gonzaga Belluzzo and Eduardo Moreira	Jornal GGN	
16	02/10/19	Not specified	Migalhas (only excerpts published)	
17	02/10/19	Ignacio Jubilla	Russia Today	
18	09/10/19	Valeria Saccone and Fanny Lothaire	France 24	
19	09/10/19	Paulo Dentinho	RTP1	
20	16/10/19	Flávio Costa and Leonardo Sakamoto	Universo Online (two parts published)	
21	23/10/19	Nina Fideles and Beatriz Pasqualino	Brasil de Fato	
22	30/10/19	Marina Amaral and Thiago Domenici	Agência Pública	

=== Loss of benefits ===
On 17 May 2018, Federal Judge Haroldo Nader, of the 6th District Court of Campinas, granted an emergency injunction in a actio popularis lawsuit and ordered Lula's benefits as former president to be cut off. The magistrate's central argument is that Lula would be safer in the Lava Jato prison in Curitiba than he would be if he were free. The magistrate highlighted the unnecessary mobilization of agents to accompany Lula wherever he went. “It is also absolutely unnecessary to have two vehicles with drivers available to someone whose right to movement is restricted to the Federal Police building in Curitiba and controlled by prison guards,” said the judge. The lawsuit was filed by Rubens Nunes, coordinator of the Free Brazil Movement (MBL). On 29 May 2018, Judge Marcelo Saraiva, of the Federal Regional Court of the 3rd Region, upheld an appeal and restored Lula's benefits as former president of the Republic, such as advisors, drivers, security guards, and an official car. The magistrate emphasized that these benefits constitute rights and privileges granted by law to former presidents and are not perks.

=== Prison visits ===
When Lula was arrested, only his family and lawyers were allowed to visit him in prison. Judge Sergio Moro ruled that lawyers could visit him every day and his family only on Wednesdays. However, a few days after his arrest, it was decided that Lula would receive family visits on a day other than Wednesday. The intention was to prevent his family from meeting with the families of his accusers, since Wednesday is the usual visiting day. The former president requested that his family visit him on Thursdays, and the Federal Police agreed. Thus, Lula began to receive visits from his family on Thursdays, while his lawyers could visit him every day. On 10 April 2018, a delegation of nine governors and three senators attempted to visit Lula in prison, but the visit was not authorized. On 3 May 2018, Lula received a visit from Senator Gleisi Hoffmann and former minister and former governor of Bahia, Jaques Wagner.

In April 2018, he was visited by Argentine Nobel Peace Prize winner Adolfo Pérez Esquivel. In June 2018, Argentine lawyer Juan Grabois attempted to visit Lula in prison, but his visit was not authorized. At the time, Grabois stated that he intended to give Lula a rosary blessed by Pope Francis. After that, information was posted on the internet that the Pope had sent a rosary as a gift to Lula, but the Vatican denied the information. The Vatican said that the rosary in question had only been blessed by the Pope, it was not a gift from him to Lula, and that Grabois' visit was personal, not on behalf of the Pope. On 2 August 2018, former minister Celso Amorim delivered a message from Pope Francis to Lula.

On 25 January 2019, Judge Carolina Lebbos ruled that former mayor Fernando Haddad could only visit Lula on Thursdays. Haddad had joined Lula's defense team and, until then, had been able to visit the former president any day of the week. The judge argued that Haddad's power of attorney to represent the former president had lost its meaning, since Haddad was defending Lula's rights as a pre-candidate for the presidency in 2018, but the elections had already passed. The judge also ruled that the former president could no longer receive visits from religious leaders every Monday, as had been authorized in 2018. Thus, Lula could only receive visits from religious leaders once a month. On 1 March 2019, Fernando Haddad obtained a new power of attorney to represent Lula in his defense and, as a result, was once again able to visit the former president regularly in prison.

On 17 September 2019, Lula received a visit in prison from a commission from the National Human Rights Council, which wanted to hear him about possible violations in Operation Car Wash proceedings, including the very case that convicted him. In October 2019, Lula received visits from Richard Trumka and Pepe Alvarez, respectively the president of the AFL-CIO, the largest trade union federation in the United States, and the secretary-general of Spain's largest trade union federation, the Unión General de Trabajadores (UGT). During this visit by union leaders, Lula received the George Meany-Lane Kirkland Human Rights Award from the AFL-CIO.

During his 500 days in prison, Lula received more visitors, such as American actor Danny Glover, singers Chico Buarque and Martinho da Vila, and former Uruguayan president José Mujica. Among others are Portuguese sociologist Boaventura de Sousa Santos, German Martin Schulz of the Social Democratic Party of Germany (SPD) and former president of the European Parliament, Brazilian theologian Leonardo Boff, American intellectual Noam Chomsky, Brazilian Buddhist leader Coen Rōshi, former Italian Prime Minister Massimo D'Alema, former governor of the Federal District of Mexico Cuauhtémoc Cárdenas, and former Brazilian President Dilma Rousseff.

=== United Nations Human Rights Committee ===
On 17 August, the United Nations Human Rights Committee requested that Brazil guarantee Lula the full exercise of his political rights, including access to the media and members of his party. The Committee also requested that he not be barred from participating in the 2018 presidential election in Brazil until appeals to higher courts had been judged impartially.

The Brazilian government, through the Ministry of Foreign Affairs, responded on the same day that the Committee would be composed of individuals who do not represent countries and that the request would not have binding effect, being only a recommendation, and informing that it had forwarded the Committee's decision to the Judiciary.

On 23 August, Sarah Cleveland, the Committee's vice-chair, emphasized that the measures are not recommendations and that Brazil must comply with the Committee's decisions, whose actions are based on commitments made by the country to become a member of the community of states that respect human rights. She explained that:

The precautionary measures issued by the UN Human Rights Committee are not recommendations. They are legally binding and impose an international legal obligation on Brazil to comply with them.

The Workers' Party even registered Lula's candidacy for the Brazilian presidency in the 2018 elections. However, on 31 August 2018, the Superior Electoral Court, by a vote of 6 to 1, barred Lula's candidacy based on the Clean Record Act, which determines that those convicted by a collegiate body are ineligible for eight years. This is the case with Lula, since the TRF-4, which convicted him in the second instance, is a collegiate body. The majority of the TSE collegiate body understood that the decision of the UN Human Rights Committee was not binding and did not have the normative power to annul the ineligibility linked to the Clean Record Act, and that the precautionary measure of the UN Committee based on the International Covenant on Civil and Political Rights (ICCPR) could not be accepted because, in addition to having been issued by only two of the eighteen members of the Committee, there was “no justification regarding the imminent risk of irreparable damage to the right to run for election, provided for in Article 25 of the ICCPR.” Furthermore, the Covenant “is an intermediate norm and cannot contradict the original text of the Constitution.” The only vote in favor of the candidacy, cast by Minister Edson Fachin, considered that, although the ICCPR is not effective in Brazil due to the lack of an executive decree, this could not prevent its validity in the national territory because “its provisions have supra-legal effect, being hierarchically below the Constitution, but above ordinary legislation.”

=== Preliminary injunction to release Lula denied ===
Controversy arose among TRF-4 judges on Sunday, 8 July 2018, over whether to release Lula or keep him in prison. The following is a chronology of events, all of which occurred on the same day:

- At around 9 a.m., Federal Judge Rogério Favreto, acting as duty judge for the Federal Regional Court of the 4th Region (TRF-4), ruled on a request for a preliminary injunction in a habeas corpus case, granting Lula's release;
- Later, around noon, Judge Sergio Moro, summoned as the coercive authority, denied coercion and replied that he had only complied with a previous ruling by the 8th panel of the TRF-4, stating that he did not have the power to determine Lula's imprisonment or release. Understanding that the judge on duty would not have the authority to grant freedom to a convicted person tried by a collegiate body, Moro requested guidance from Judge João Pedro Gebran Neto;
- Forty minutes later, Favreto issued a new order, reiterating his decision to release him;
- At around 1 p.m., the Federal Public Prosecutor's Office requested reconsideration of the preliminary injunction granted at 9 a.m. by Favreto;
- At around 2:20 p.m., Federal Judge João Pedro Gebran Neto, who was the presiding judge in the Car Wash cases in the second instance, assumed jurisdiction over the habeas corpus petition and ruled that Favreto's decision should not be enforced;
- At around 4 p.m., despite the intervention, Judge Favreto again ordered the release of former President Lula, arguing that he had deliberated on new facts, granting a period of one hour for compliance;
- At around 6 p.m., the Federal Public Prosecutor's Office spoke up again, requesting that the president of the Court resolve the disagreement;
- A little over thirty minutes after 7 p.m., the president of the TRF-4, Federal Judge Carlos Eduardo Thompson Flores Lenz, ruled that Lula should remain in prison and that the case should be returned to the judge responsible for the Lava Jato cases in the Court, Federal Judge Gebran Neto.

Excerpt from Thompson Flores' ruling that resolved the issue in the TRF-4:

In this equation, considering that the matter discussed in the habeas corpus does not challenge analysis under the judicial duty system and given the right of the Federal Reporting Judge to use the institution of assumption of jurisdiction to preserve his own jurisdiction (Internal Regulations/TRF-4R, art. 202), I order the return of the case files to the Office of Federal Judge João Pedro Gebran Neto, as well as the maintenance of the decision he rendered in event 17.

Subsequently, Veja magazine published on 11 August 2018, that “Gebran Neto admitted to friends that he ignored the letter of the law when he ruled against Lula's release” at the time, “disregarding the jurisdiction of the judge on duty.” The publication of the news caused the hashtag “#GebranForaDaLei” (#GebranOutlaw) to remain among the Trending topics in Brazil on Twitter for most of the day, generating accusations of bias and disrespect for institutions on the part of the judge.

== Release from custody ==
After 580 days imprisoned in the Federal Police jail in Curitiba, Lula was released on 8 November 2019, one day after the Federal Supreme Court ruled that imprisonment after conviction in the second instance was unconstitutional. The decision for immediate release was made by Judge Danilo Pereira Júnior, of the 12th Federal Court of Curitiba, after a request by lawyer Cristiano Zanin. Accompanying Lula's release from prison were, in addition to his lawyer Zanin, members of the Workers' Party, including Fernando Haddad, Gliesi Hoffman, Wadih Damous, and Lindbergh Farias. It was also Lula's first public appearance with Rosângela Lula da Silva, his new girlfriend at the time and future first lady of Brazil.

Lula said that during the 580 days he spent in prison, he read more than forty books.

== Repercussions of the arrest ==
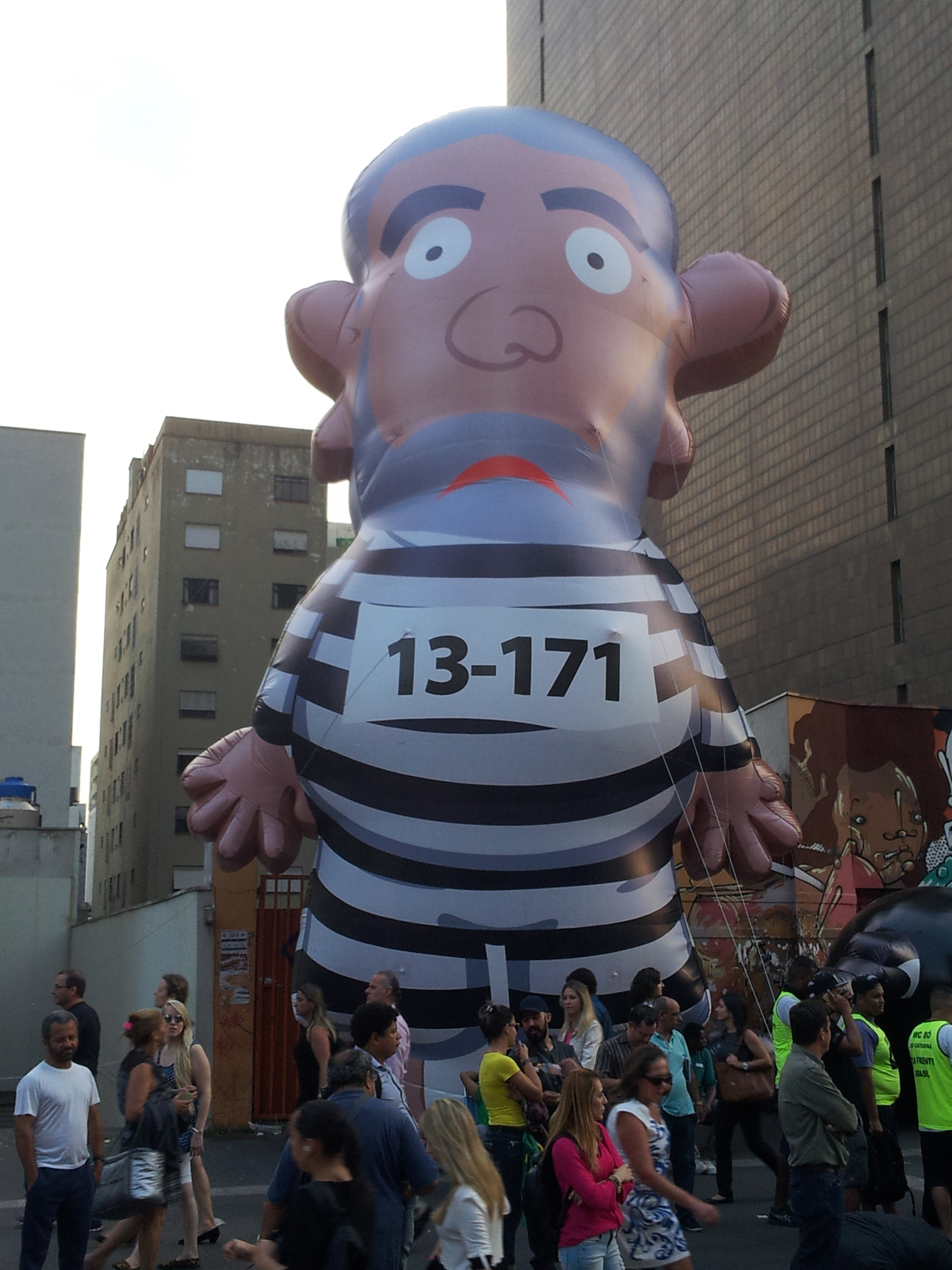
A doll used in demonstrations depicts Lula as a prisoner. The inflatable doll was called 'Pixuleco', in reference to the Federal Police's Operation Pixuleco. Lula's imprisonment was one of the demands made in the protests against Dilma Rousseff's government.

=== Press ===
- The New York Times: highlighted the turnaround that Lula's imprisonment represented for the Brazilian presidential elections. The American newspaper quoted Lula's speech, in which he promised to regain control of Brazil's destiny and prioritize policies to reduce inequality in the country. The article also highlighted the political division in the country, “with some Brazilians setting off fireworks and honking their horns while others lamented the arrest.” In an editorial, the newspaper concluded that “Despite the success of Operation Car Wash, nothing has been done to fix the judicial system. The danger of a shift toward populism and political radicalization is obvious.”
- Al Jazeera: published an extensive article, emphasizing that the former Brazilian president continues to assert his innocence.
- Le Monde: published “the fall of the icon of the Brazilian left” and quoted the former president's speech to his supporters.
- O Globo: in an editorial, the newspaper stated that “Lula's imprisonment reinforces the rule of law” and affirmed that “more than ever, the republican maxim that justice is for all applies.”
- Folha de S.Paulo: In an editorial entitled “Obey the law,” the newspaper praised the decision and added, “apart from a small group of militants, driven by nonconformity or hatred, society is mature and calm enough to resolve its conflicts and problems. Corruption is one of them, and Brazilian progress, in this regard, is confirmed once again.”

=== Presidential candidates ===
Repercussions among the candidates for the presidency of the republic in the 2018 presidential election in Brazil, which took place not long after Lula's imprisonment:

==== Favorable ====
- Marina Silva, presidential candidate for Sustainability Network (REDE), said that the former president's conviction shows that “no one is above the law.” Still on the subject of imprisonment, Marina stated that "Today is a difficult day, because we have a situation where a former president of the Republic is about to serve his sentence for the crimes he committed. But this indicates that we are beginning a process of changing the law that should apply to everyone."
- Geraldo Alckmin, presidential candidate for the Brazilian Social Democracy Party (PSDB) defended the arrest of the former president and said that “no one is above the law.” “In public life, everyone has a duty to be accountable,” Alckimin said.
- Alvaro Dias, presidential candidate for Podemos (PODE), stated that the Clean Record Act benefits from Lula's imprisonment, and praised the arrest. He also criticized “those who wave their red flags in the streets of the country calling for freedom for the leader of the criminal organization.”
- Jair Bolsonaro, presidential candidate for the Social Liberal Party (PSL), defended the imprisonment of the former president.
- Vera Lúcia, presidential candidate for the Unified Socialist Workers' Party (PSTU), expressed her support and stated that “Lula was reaping what he had sown.”

==== Opponents ====
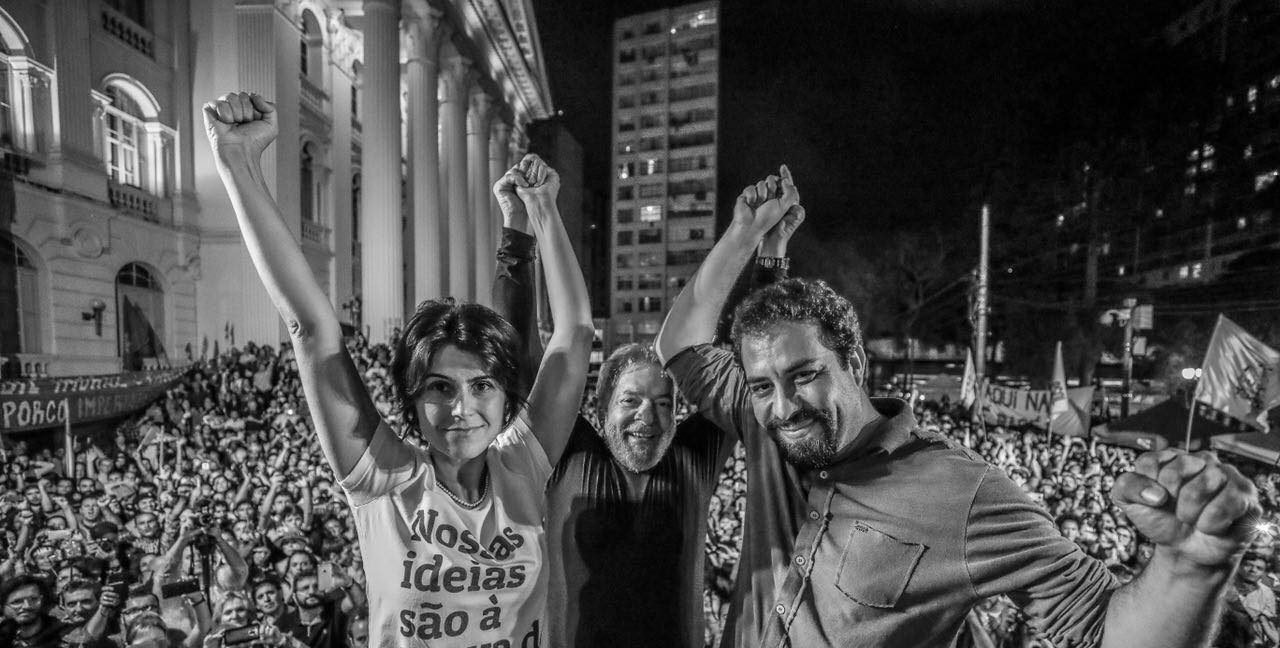
Manuela d'Ávila, Lula, and Guilherme Boulos at a protest against the former president's imprisonment in Curitiba.

- Manuela d'Ávila, presidential candidate for the Communist Party of Brazil (PCdoB), has spoken out against Lula's imprisonment and actively participates in “Pro-Lula” demonstrations.
- Guilherme Boulos, presidential candidate for the Socialism and Liberty Party (PSOL), took a stand against Lula's imprisonment and criticized Ciro Gomes for his absence from the demonstration before the former president's arrest.
- Ciro Gomes, presidential candidate for the Democratic Labour Party (PDT), first said that society had become “suspicious” that the law was only harsh on the PT and Lula. “It seems that harsh laws only apply to one side in Brazil. Harsh laws are very good if they apply to everyone,” said Ciro. Ciro then said that the sentence that convicted Lula was weak and unfair.
- Fernando Haddad, the PT's presidential candidate who replaced Lula as the party's candidate, said he would seek all legal means to free the former president. But he denied that, if elected, he would presidential pardon to Lula, stated in an interview with Central Brasileira de Notícias.
- José Maria Eymael, presidential candidate for the Christian Democracy (DC), said that Lula's imprisonment is “unconstitutional.”

=== Foreign parties ===
The Spanish party Podemos criticized the arrest of the former president. One of the party's representatives in the European Parliament stated that “Brazil does not meet the minimum democratic conditions.” The party stated that the process at all stages “has been based on irregularities.” It also stated that the process is linked to the interests of the elite who are trying to prevent the PT from returning to the presidency of the country. The party asked the European Parliament to suspend negotiations with Mercosur.

The Colombian party Common Alternative Revolutionary Force (FARC) declared its solidarity “with comrade and former Brazilian president Lula, rejecting the decision taken against him by the Brazilian Supreme Court and demanding all political and judicial guarantees under the Brazilian constitution, its internal order, and international law.” In a statement, Raúl Castro, first secretary of the Communist Party of Cuba (PCC) and former Cuban president, reiterated that Cuba will always stand by the Brazilian people. Read the full message: “To our comrade Lula, victim of political persecution and coup maneuvers, we express our solidarity in the face of the maneuver to prevent his candidacy in the upcoming elections. Lula, Dilma Rousseff, the PT, and the Brazilian people will always have Cuba by their side.”

=== Other repercussions ===
- Former President Fernando Henrique Cardoso said in an interview with Radio CBN that justice had been served and that it was not a political arrest, given that all the necessary procedures had been followed. However, he stated that he was “not happy.”
- Former President Dilma Rousseff stated that Lula was innocent and would know how to handle the situation.
- Former President José Sarney said he “deeply regretted the arrest” and stated, “I am his friend and was quite shocked.”
- Businessman and politician João Doria said that Brazil woke up relieved and referred to the PT member as a “crook” and a “liar.”
- The Free Brazil Movement (MBL) and Come to the Movimento Vem pra Rua (MVPR) advocated for Lula's imprisonment, and a month earlier, they called for public demonstrations demanding the former president's arrest.

In mid-April 2018, an opinion poll conducted by Datafolha indicated that 54 percent of voters surveyed by the institute considered Lula's imprisonment to be “fair,” while 40 percent disagreed. Another 62 percent believed that Lula would not run in that year's presidential election. Shortly after his imprisonment, however, election polls showed that, even though he had been convicted and imprisoned, Lula continued to lead the race for the 2018 election, with about 30 percent of voters saying they would vote for him. Months later, in August 2018, Lula continued to lead the polls for the 2018 election. On the other hand, he also had a high rejection rate of 34 percent, the second highest among the candidates. The polls also showed that, in a scenario without Lula in the election, Jair Bolsonaro led the race.

Former European leaders, including François Hollande, defended Lula's participation in the 2018 elections after his arrest. The Minister of Foreign Affairs at the time, Aloysio Nunes, described the demonstration as “arrogant,” saying he was incredulous about the request.

In December 2019, one month after Lula was released, a new Datafolha poll showed that 54 percent of respondents considered his release to be fair, while 42 percent disagreed.

In September 2021, former OAS president Léo Pinheiro wrote a letter in which he recanted some of the accusations he had made against Lula in his plea bargain agreement with Operation Car Wash. The letter was used to dismiss a complaint against Lula, in which he was accused of influence peddling during a lecture in Costa Rica.

== Vaza Jato ==
Starting on 9 June 2019, the online newspaper The Intercept Brasil, the Brazilian version of the American publication The Intercept, leaked a series of messages from conversations held via the Telegram app between then-judge Sergio Moro, then-prosecutor Deltan Dallagnol, and other members of Operation Car Wash. The transcripts indicated that Moro provided privileged information to the prosecution, helping the Federal Public Prosecutor's Office (MPF) to build cases, as well as guiding the prosecution, suggesting changes to the phases of Operation Car Wash. They also showed that he demanded speed in new operations, gave strategic advice, provided informal clues, and suggested appeals to the MPF.

This increased criticism that Moro had not been an impartial judge. Messages exchanged between prosecutor Deltan Dallagnol and other members of Operation Car Wash indicate that there were doubts about the strength of the evidence presented by the prosecution in the Guarujá triplex case, which led to Lula's imprisonment.

== Annulment of convictions ==
On 8 March 2021, Supreme Court Justice Edson Fachin overturned Lula's convictions on the grounds that they were handed down by a court that did not have jurisdiction to hear the case. The decision granted a habeas corpus petition filed by the former president's defense team in November 2020. Fachin ruled that the Federal Court of Paraná did not have jurisdiction to hear the four cases in the lawsuit, and the cases were transferred to the Federal Court of the Federal District, which must now validate or overturn the decisions of the Federal Court of Paraná. As a result, Lula regained his political rights. Fachin declared null and void all decisions of the 13th Federal Court of Curitiba, which must comply with the decision and refer the case files to the Federal Court of the Federal District, as well as the “loss of the object,” extinguishing fourteen cases pending before the STF questioning Sergio Moro's impartiality in Lula's convictions. On 15 April 2021, the plenary session of the Federal Supreme Court, by a majority vote from 8 to 3, officially overturned the convictions of the former president handed down by then-judge Sergio Moro in the context of Operation Car Wash.

== Sergio Moro's suspicion ==
The day after Justice Fachin's decision, the Second Panel of the STF, presided over by Justice Gilmar Mendes, decided to uphold the trial of Moro's suspicion in his actions in the Car Wash investigation. In addition to Gilmar Mendes, Justices Nunes Marques, Cármen Lúcia, and Ricardo Lewandowski voted in favor of upholding the trial. Fachin upheld his decision, arguing that the defense had presented “new and robust evidence, with serious facts,” which would require more time to analyze and that he, as rapporteur of the case, would have the prerogative to prevent the trial from proceeding, due to the loss of the object and prejudice of the habeas corpus petition filed by Lula's defense. After gaining access to conversations between Moro and Lava Jato prosecutors in Curitiba, the former president's lawyers considered that there were strong arguments demonstrating Moro's bias, such as the disclosure of wiretaps and authorization for coercive conduct.

Most of the ministers in the second panel agreed with several points raised by Lula's defense team. Among the points cited are:

- The authorization for Lula's coercive conduct in 2016, without first summoning him to testify and all the “spectacularization” surrounding that coercive conduct;
- The wiretapping of Lula's lawyers without first adopting other investigative measures (the wiretapping of Lula's lawyers was also considered serious by the Order of Attorneys of Brazil);
- The selective disclosure of Lula's wiretaps, including a conversation with then-President Dilma Rousseff about Lula's move to the Chief of Staff of the Presidency in 2016;
- The end of the confidentiality of former Minister Antônio Palocci's plea bargain a week before the 2018 election, causing some influence on the election;
- The fact that Sérgio Moro accepted the position of Minister of Justice under Jair Bolsonaro, Lula's political opponent.

On 23 March 2021, the second panel of the Federal Supreme Court granted Habeas Corpus 164.493 filed by Lula's defense and declared former judge Sergio Moro's suspicion in the Guarujá triplex case, which led to the former president's arrest. Justices Gilmar Mendes, Cármen Lúcia, and Ricardo Lewandowski voted in favor of habeas corpus, while Justices Edson Fachin and Nunes Marques dissented. Three months later, the full Supreme Court, by a vote of 7 to 4, upheld the Second Panel's decision declaring Moro suspect.

Supreme Court votes on Sergio Moro's recusal in Lula's case
Favor of suspicion	Against suspicion	Ref
Gilmar Mendes	Edson Fachin	
Alexandre de Moraes	Luís Roberto Barroso	
Ricardo Lewandowski	Marco Aurélio Mello	
Dias Toffoli	Luiz Fux	
Rosa Weber		
Cármen Lúcia		
Nunes Marques		

With this decision, the proceedings, which weeks earlier had been redirected by Fachin's decision, also had their preliminary proceedings annulled, so that no action taken by the former judge could be reused by the competent court.

One day after the STF plenary confirmed the decision of the second panel, Justice Gilmar Mendes extended Moro's recusal to two more cases involving the former president: the Atibaia ranch case and those related to an apartment in São Bernardo do Campo and the Lula Institute. The justice considered that Moro had also acted in these cases. As a result, these cases were also annulled and must start from scratch, so that the actions taken in them cannot be reused by the new judge, as in the case of the triplex.

== Closure ==
With the annulment of Lula's convictions and the suspicion of former judge Sergio Moro by the Federal Supreme Court, the Guarujá triplex case was referred to the Federal Court in Brasilia, where it would be restarted. But on 7 December 2021, the Federal District Attorney's Office requested that the triplex case be dismissed, arguing that it would not be possible to conduct a new investigation and a new trial on the case before it expired. On 28 January 2022, Judge Pollyanna Alves, of the 12th Federal Criminal Court in Brasília, agreed with the Prosecutor's Office and thus decided to dismiss the triplex case.

The Federal Prosecutor's Office filed a new complaint against Lula in the Atibaia ranch case, but the complaint was rejected by the judge in Brasília, who considered that the complaint did not provide new evidence to restart the proceedings. On 27 April 2022, the United Nations Human Rights Committee ruled that Moro had been biased in Lula's trial.

In the 2022 Brazilian presidential election, Lula was elected president for the third time. During the election, one of Lula's prison guards advocated voting for him. After taking office, Lula nominated lawyer Cristiano Zanin, who defended him in the Operation Car Wash trials, to be a Supreme Court justice, which drew some criticism. Lula also chose former Supreme Court Justice Ricardo Lewandowski, who had retired from the Court in 2023, to be Minister of Justice, which drew criticism from former judge Sergio Moro, who said that this would demonstrate that accepting the position of Minister of Justice is not cause for suspicion. Former prosecutor Deltan Dallagnol also criticized Lewandoswki's nomination and, after being elected federal deputy for Paraná, he was removed from office because, according to Minister Benedito Gonçalves of the TSE, he committed “fraud” against the Clean Record Act by requesting resignation from the MPF 11 months before the elections, while facing internal proceedings that could lead to his dismissal — and, consequently, his ineligibility.

On 6 September 2023, Supreme Court Justice Dias Toffoli annulled all evidence obtained from Odebrecht's plea bargain statements and stated that Lula's imprisonment was “one of the greatest judicial errors in the country's history.”

== Timeline summary ==
=== Guarujá Triplex case ===
2016

- 9 March: Indictment filed by MP-SP (São Paulo State Prosecutor's Office)
- 28 April: The São Paulo court sends the case files to the Federal Court of Paraná
- 14 September: MPF (Federal Prosecutor's Office) indicts Lula
- 20 September: Moro accepts the indictment; Lula becomes a defendant

2017

- 10 May: Lula testifies before Moro
- 12 July: Moro convicts Lula (9 years and 6 months)

2018

- 24 January: TRF-4 upholds Lula's conviction (12 years and 1 month)
- 6 March: STJ denies habeas corpus by 5–0
- 22 March: STF grants Lula a safe conduct until the habeas corpus is judged
- 26 March: TRF-4 rejects Lula's final appeals
- 4 April: STF denies Lula's preventive habeas corpus by 6–5
- 5 April: Moro orders Lula's arrest
- 7 April: Lula is arrested and taken to the Federal Police
- 8 July: Thompson Flores keeps Lula in prison after the Favreto vs. Gebran Neto dispute

2019

- 29 January: Death of Lula's brother, Vavá
- 1 March: Death of Lula's grandson, Arthur
- 23 April: STJ upholds Lula's conviction and reduces the sentence to 8 years, 10 months and 20 days
- 26 April: First of 22 prison interviews (Folha de S.Paulo and El País)
- 9 June: Start of the Vaza Jato leaks
- 8 November: Lula is released one day after the STF rules that imprisonment before all appeals are exhausted is unconstitutional (580 days in prison – 1 year, 7 months and 1 day)

2021

- 8 March: Fachin annuls Lula's convictions in Lava Jato
- 23 March: STF Second Panel declares Moro biased by 3–2
- 15 April: STF confirms the annulment of Lula's cases by 8–3
- 23 June: STF declares Moro biased by 7–4
- 7 December: The Federal Prosecutor's Office in the Federal District requests the case be dropped

2022

- 27 January: Federal Court in Brasília closes the Triplex case

=== Atibaia Ranch case ===
2017

- 22 May: MPF indicts Lula
- 1 August: Moro accepts the indictment and Lula becomes a defendant

2019

- 6 February: Gabriela Hardt convicts Lula (12 years and 11 months)
- 27 November: TRF-4 upholds Lula's conviction (17 years, 1 month and 10 days)

2020

- 6 May: TRF-4 rejects appeals and upholds the conviction

2021

- 8 March: Fachin annuls Lula's convictions in Lava Jato
- 24 June: STF extends the ruling on Moro's bias to the ranch case
- 21 August: Brasília court rejects a new indictment and the case is closed

== See also ==
- 2014 Brazilian economic crisis
- Arrest of Jair Bolsonaro
- Free Lula movement
- Operation Car Wash
- Vaza Jato
