= José Carlos Oliveira =

Brazilian administrator and politician (born 1965)

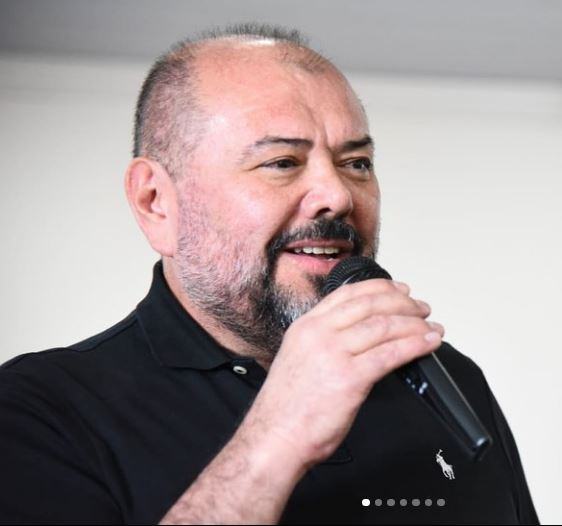

Minister of Labor and Social Security
- In office 30 March 2022 – 31 December 2022
- Preceded by: Onyx Lorenzoni
- Succeeded by: Luiz Marinho (as Labour and Employment)

President of the National Social Security Institute
- In office 10 November 2021 – 30 March 2022
- Preceded by: Leonardo José Rolim Guimarães
- Succeeded by: Guilherme Gastaldello Pinheiro Serrano

Councilman of São Paulo
- In office 9 October 2012 – 20 November 2012

Personal details
- Born: José Carlos Oliveira; 25 October 1965 (age 60) Macambira, Sergipe, Brazil
- Party: DEM; PSD (2012); Independent
- Education: Fundação Escola de Comércio Álvares Penteado (FECAP)

Ahmed Mohamad Oliveira (born José Carlos Oliveira, 25 October 1965) is a Brazilian social security specialist, administrator, and politician. He was the president of the Instituto Nacional do Seguro Social (INSS) from 10 November 2021 to 30 March 2022. He later was the Minister of Labour and Social Security under the Jair Bolsonaro administration until 31 December 2022.

== Biography ==
Oliveira was born on 25 October 1965 in Macambira, Sergipe. In July 1985, he became part of the INSS, then called the Instituto Nacional de Previdência Social (INPS), through the civil service exam.

He graduated with a degree in business administration from the Fundação Escola de Comércio Álvares Penteado (FECAP) in São Paulo in 1996.

Oliveira resigned in 2003, without any remuneration by the institution, to participate in private initiatives and parliamentary activities until August 2016. During this time, from 2008 to 2012, he was elected as a substitute councilman for Antonio Carlos Rodrigues, as part of the Democrats (DEM) in São Paulo. He assumed the mandate as a member of the Social Democratic Party (PSD) from 9 October to 20 November 2012. He is no longer affiliated with any political party.

Starting in 2016, he assumed various positions at the INSS, including the presidency starting on 10 November 2021. He left the position on 30 March 2022 to become the Minister of Labour and Social Security, succeeding Onyx Lorenzoni. He was succeeded by Luiz Marinho.

Originally an Evangelical Christian, Oliveira converted to Islam right after leaving office and changed his name to Ahmed Mohamad Oliveira, as it was revealed during a hearing of the INSS Inquiry Commission.

Government offices
Preceded by Leonardo Rolim Guimarães	President of the National Social Security Institute; 2021–2022	Succeeded by Guilherme Pinheiro Serrano
Political offices
Preceded by Onyx Lorenzoni	Minister of Labour and Social Security; 2022	Succeeded by Luiz Marinho as Minister of Labour and Employment
Preceded by Onyx Lorenzoni	Minister of Labour and Social Security; 2022	Succeeded by Carlos Lupi as Minister of Social Security
