= Free Lula movement =

Brazilian political and social movement

Free Lula Movement
- O Comitê de Solidariedade Internacional em Defesa de Lula
- Formation: 2018
- Professional title: International Committee of Solidarity in Defence of Lula and Democracy in Brazil
- Headquarters: São Paulo
- Location: Brazil
- Key people: Adolfo Perez Esquivel; José Pepe Mujica; Danny Glover; Alberto Fernández
- Website: comitelulalivre.org

The International Committee of Solidarity in Defence of Lula and Democracy in Brazil (Brazilian Portuguese: Comitê Internacional de Solidariedade a Lula preso no Brasil), also known as the Free Lula Movement (Brazilian Portuguese: Movimento Lula Livre), was a political and social movement composed of several Brazilian entities that advocated the release of the then ex-President Luiz Inácio Lula da Silva, known as Lula, from prison. Lula was convicted of money laundering and passive corruption, defined in Brazilian criminal law as the receipt of a bribe by a civil servant or government official. In 2017 he was sentenced to nine years and six months in prison by judge Sergio Moro. On February 6, 2019, in another trial he was sentenced to 12 years and 11 months of imprisonment for the crimes of passive corruption and money laundering in the process that deals with the receipt of undue advantages through reforms made at a site in Atibaia and paid by Odebrecht and Schahin as counterpart for the conclusion of overburdened contracts with Petrobras. However, leaked cellphone chats published by The Intercept suggested Sergio Moro, who became a justice minister after the conviction, steered the case against Lula.

In November 2019, the Supreme Federal Court ruled that incarcerations with pending appeals were unlawful and Lula was released from prison as a result. In March 2021, Supreme Court Justice Edson Fachin ruled that all of Lula's convictions must be nullified, because he was tried by a court that did not have proper jurisdiction over his case. Fachin's ruling, which was confirmed by other Supreme Court Justices in April 2021, restored Lula's political rights. The Supreme Federal Court ruled later in March 2021 that judge Moro, who oversaw his corruption trial, was biased. All of the cases Moro had brought against Lula were annulled by 24 June 2021.

The movement included trade union leaders from more than 50 countries. The support has also came from Adolfo Pérez Esquivel, the Nobel laureate of Argentina, José Pepe Mujica, the former president of Uruguay, Danny Glover, a UN goodwill Ambassador, Noam Chomsky, in addition to foreign leftist leaders, such as Michelle Bachelet from Chile and Bolivian leader Evo Morales.

== Supporters ==
- Vagner Freitas, president of CUT
- João Pedro Stédile, president of the MST
- Jörg Hofmann, president of the IndustriALL Global Union
- Luciana de Oliveira Santos, president of the PC do B
- Philip Jennings, Ex-General Secretary of UNI Global Union
- Jocélio Henrique Drummond, Interamericas Regional Secretary of Public Services International
- União Brasileira de Mulheres (UBM)
- Victor Báez Mosqueira, General Secretary of the La Confederación Sindical de Trabajadores y Trabajadoras de las Americas
- Adolfo Perez Esquivel, the Argentinian Nobel Prize laureate
- José Pepe Mujica, the former president of Uruguay
- Danny Glover, the UN Goodwill Ambassador
- Jeremy Corbyn, Leader of the UK Labour Party 2015–2020 and Member of Parliament
- Jean-Luc Mélenchon, member of the French National Assembly and candidate in the 2012 and 2017 French presidential elections
- Alberto Fernández, President of Argentina
- Michael Brooks
- Others – União Nacional dos Estudantes (UNE), União Brasileira dos Estudantes Secundaristas (Ubes), Marcha das Mulheres, Central dos Trabalhadores e Trabalhadoras do Brasil (CTB), União da Juventude Socialista (UJS), União dos Negros pela Igualdade (Unegro), União Municipal dos Estudantes Secundaristas (UMES) e União Estadual dos Estudantes do Amazonas (UEE).

== See also ==
- Brazilian criminal justice
