= João Antonio Felicio =

Brazilian trade unionist (1950–2020)

João Antonio Felicio (6 November 1950 – 19 March 2020) was a Brazilian trade unionist.

Born in Itapuí, Felicio became a butcher at the age of fifteen, but then trained in the arts and in 1973 became a teacher of drawing. In 1977, he first took part in protests by teachers against the military dictatorship, and was soon elected to its organising committee. He also joined the Movement for the Emancipation of the Proletariat.

In 1980, Felicio was a founder of the Workers' Party (PT). The following year, he was elected to the board of the State Education Teachers' Trade Union of the State of São Paulo (APEOESP), and this led him in 1983 to become a founder member of the Central Única dos Trabalhadores (CUT). In 1987, he was elected as president of the APEOESP, and his time in office encompassed an 82-day strike in 1991 which led to teachers' salaries more than doubling.

In 1993, Felicio stood down from his trade union office to return to teaching, but the following year, he was appointed to the executive of CUT, on the nomination of the APEOESP. He led CUT's work on education and pensions, the International Labour Organization and human rights. He became the general secretary of CUT in 1997, and also won election to the national executive of the PT. In 2000, he became the president of CUT, and in this role helped create the World Social Forum.

Felicio was National Mobilisation Co-ordinator for the PT in 2002, and from 2003 was the party's National Trade Union Secretary. In 2005, he became president of CUT once more, then in 2006 moved to become its secretary for international relations. From 2007, he represented CUT on the board of the International Trade Union Confederation, becoming vice-president, and then serving as president from 2014 to 2018, the first Latin American to hold the post.

Trade union offices
Preceded by ?	General Secretary of the Central Única dos Trabalhadores; 1997–2000	Succeeded by Carlos Alberto Grana
Preceded by Vicente Paulo da Silva	President of the Central Única dos Trabalhadores; 2000–2003	Succeeded by Luiz Marinho
Preceded by Carlos Alberto Grana	General Secretary of the Central Única dos Trabalhadores; 2003–2005	Succeeded by Artur Henrique da Silva
Preceded by Luiz Marinho	President of the Central Única dos Trabalhadores; 2005–2006	Succeeded by Artur Henrique da Silva Santos
Preceded by Michael Sommer	President of the International Trade Union Confederation; 2014–2018	Succeeded by Ayuba Wabba
