= TV dos Trabalhadores =

TV dos Trabalhadores (ZYB 920)
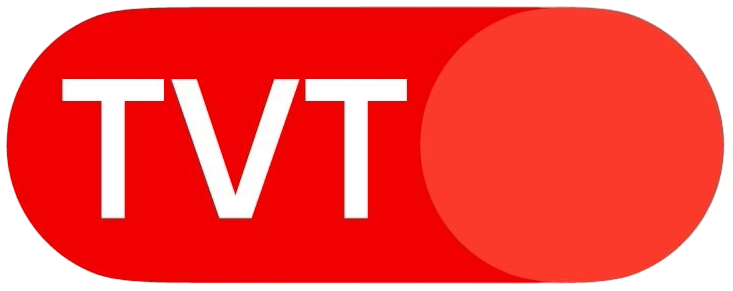
- Logo used since 2024
- São Bernardo do Campo, Mogi das Cruzes; Brazil
- Channels: Digital: 44 (UHF)

Programming
- Language: Portuguese

Ownership
- Owner: Fundação Sociedade Comunicação, Cultura e Trabalho
- Sister stations: Rádio Brasil Atual

History
- Founded: August 23, 2010
- Former channel numbers: 46 (analog, 2010–2017)
- Former affiliations: TV Brasil (2011-2020)

Technical information
- Licensing authority: ANATEL
- Class: C
- ERP: 0.040 kW
- Transmitter coordinates: 23°28′49.01″S 46°12′0″W

Links
- Public license information: Profile
- Website: tvt.org.br

The TV dos Trabalhadores (Workers' TV, also known as TVT) is a Brazilian television broadcaster founded in 2010 with headquarters and studios in the city of São Bernardo do Campo and a concession in the city of Mogi das Cruzes, both in the metropolitan region of São Paulo. It belongs to Fundação Sociedade Comunicação, Cultura e Trabalho, founded by ABC Metalworkers' Union and Sindicato dos Bancários e Financiários de São Paulo, Osasco and Região that also maintains Rádio Brasil Atual.

== History ==
In 1986, a production company linked to the Sindicato dos Metalúrgicos do ABC was created with the objective of recording and documenting in video the history and activities of the union.

Years later in 1993, in the face of the employee strike and financial crisis at Rede Manchete, the Central Única dos Trabalhadores presented a proposal to transform the broadcaster into a foundation managed by the union as a form of compensation for late payments. This proposal had the support of the then-governor of Rio de Janeiro, Leonel Brizola, who took the proposal to president Itamar Franco, who rejected it.

After 15 more years, finally in October 2009, the Ministry of Communications granted a concession to TVT, thus becoming the first television broadcaster granted to a union entity in Brazil. It went on air on August 23, 2010, with the presence of then-president Luiz Inácio Lula da Silva at its inauguration ceremony. In its first months, it had technical and operational support from NGT to broadcast its signal in São Paulo.

In April 2014, the Ministry of Communications authorized TVT to transmit its programming in a digital signal to Greater São Paulo.

In September 2017, the broadcaster hired sports commentator José Trajano and in January 2018, hired sports journalist Juca Kfouri to present programs related to sports and politics at the station.

In April 2018, the station reached its largest audience by broadcasting live coverage of the prison sentence of former president Luiz Inácio Lula da Silva, with footage shot by TVT rebroadcast by other stations such as Globo and Band. The TVT coordinator said at the time that he would sue the broadcasters for copyright infringement.
