= Vicente Paulo da Silva =

Brazilian politician (born 1956)

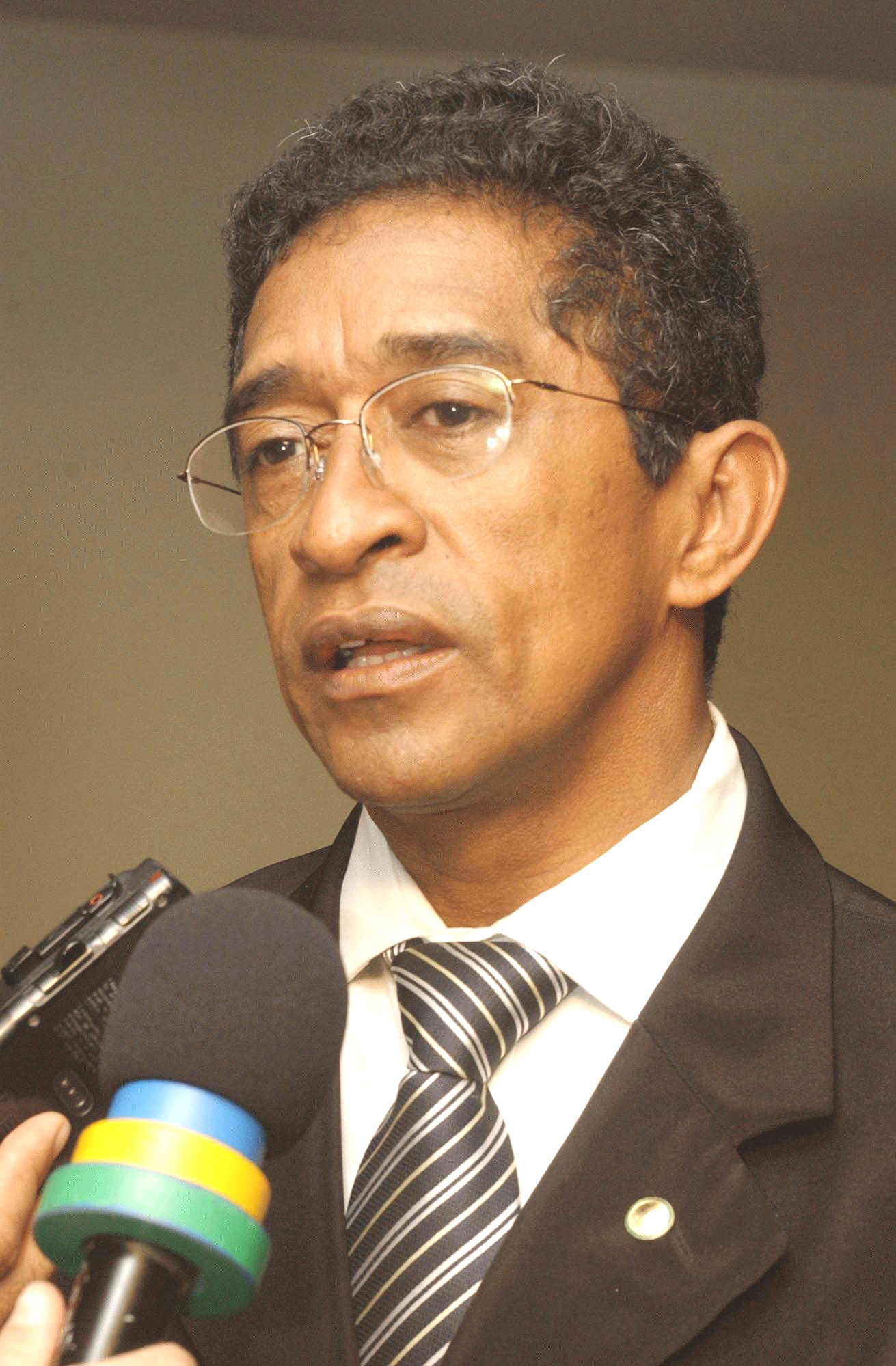
- Vicentinho in November 2003

Federal Deputy for São Paulo
- Incumbent
- Assumed office 1 February 2003

State Deputy for São Paulo
- In office 1 February 1999 – 31 January 2003

Personal details
- Born: 8 April 1956 (age 70) Santa Cruz, Rio Grande do Norte, Brazil
- Party: PT (1981–)

Vicente Paulo da Silva (born 8 April 1956) more commonly known as Vicentinho is a Brazilian politician as well as a syndicalist and trade union president. Although born in Rio Grande do Norte, he has spent his political career representing São Paulo, having served as federal deputy representative since 2003.

== Personal life ==
Vicentinho is the son of Francisco Germano da Silva and Maria Jeronimo da Silva. Prior to entering politics he was the head of syndicalist organization in São Paulo and was the president for 36 years of a trade union called "Central Única dos Trabalhadores" (CUT) that campaigned for wage equality.

== Political career ==
Vicentinho voted against the impeachment motion of then-president Dilma Rousseff and political reformation. He would later vote in favor of opening a similar corruption investigation against Rousseff's successor Michel Temer, and voted against the 2017 Brazilian labor reforms.

Vicentinho was investigated during Operation Car Wash for allegedly taking R$ 30,000 in bribes from Odebrecht.

Trade union offices
Preceded by Jair Meneguelli	President of the Central Única dos Trabalhadores; 1991–2000	Succeeded by João Antonio Felicio
