= Jair Meneguelli =

Brazilian politician

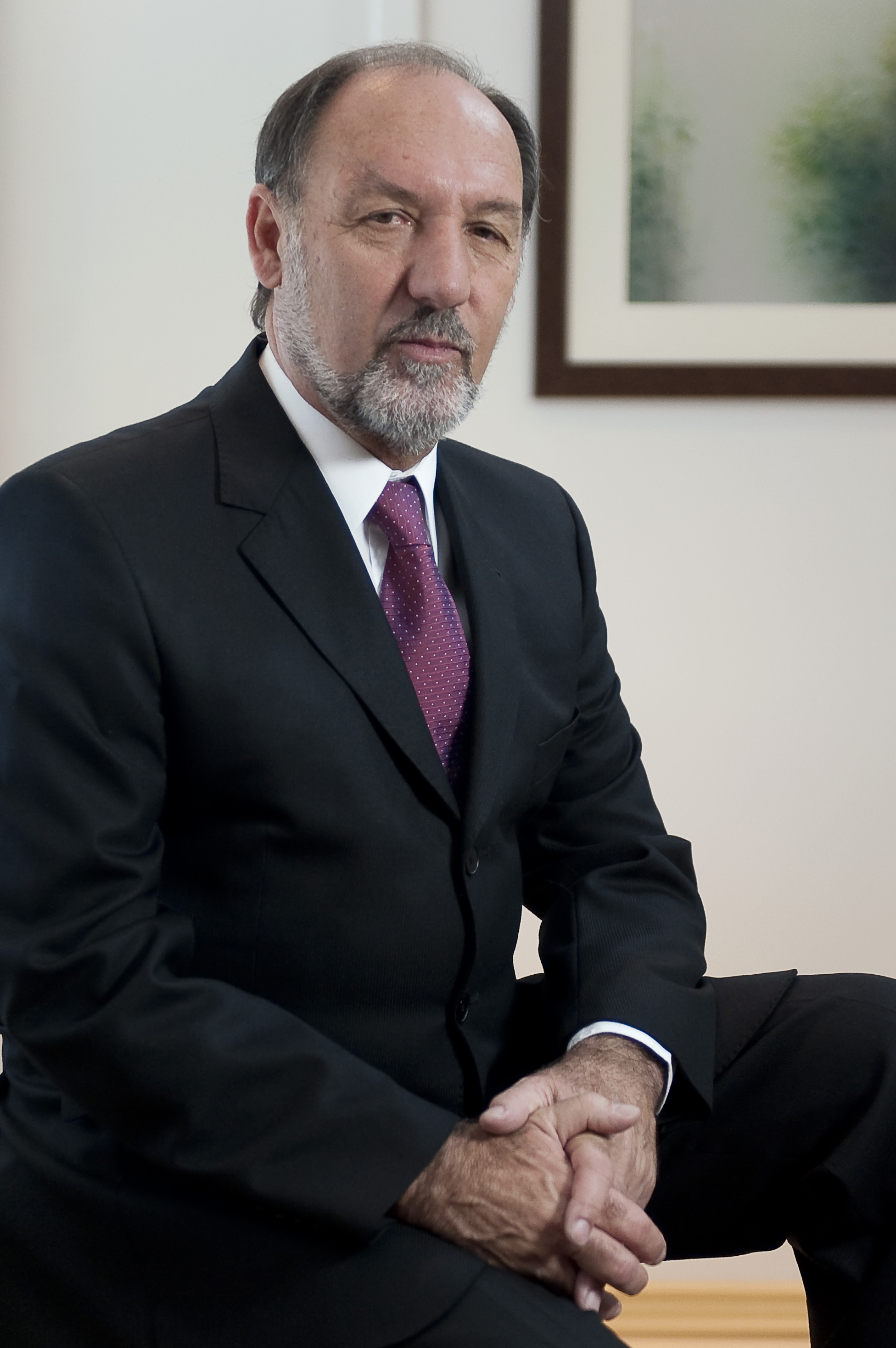
- Jair Meneguelli in 2011

President of the National Council of SESI
- In office February 1, 2003 to January 31, 2015
- Preceded by: Leonor Barreto Franco
- Succeeded by: Gilberto Carvalho

Congressman
- In office February 1, 1995 to January 31, 1999

Federal Deputy
- In office February 1, 1999 to January 31, 2003

President-Founder of CUT Nacional
- In office August 1, 1983 to April 31, 1994

President of the ABC Metallurgists Union - SP
- In office February 1, 1983 to October 31, 1987

Personal details
- Born: July 16, 1947 São Paulo, SP
- Party: PT
- Spouse: Edina Meneguelli
- Profession: Toolsmith

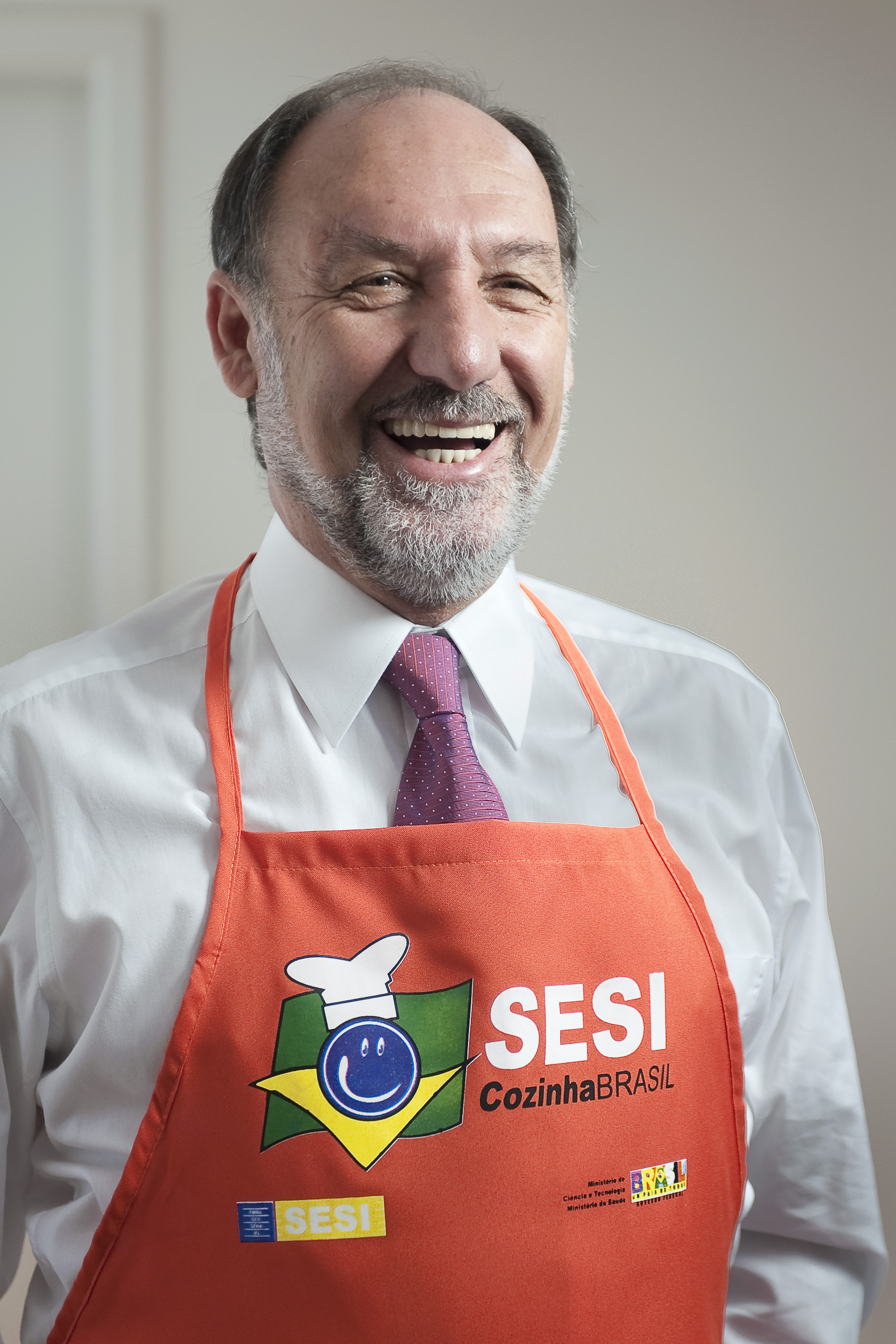
Meneguelli in 2011

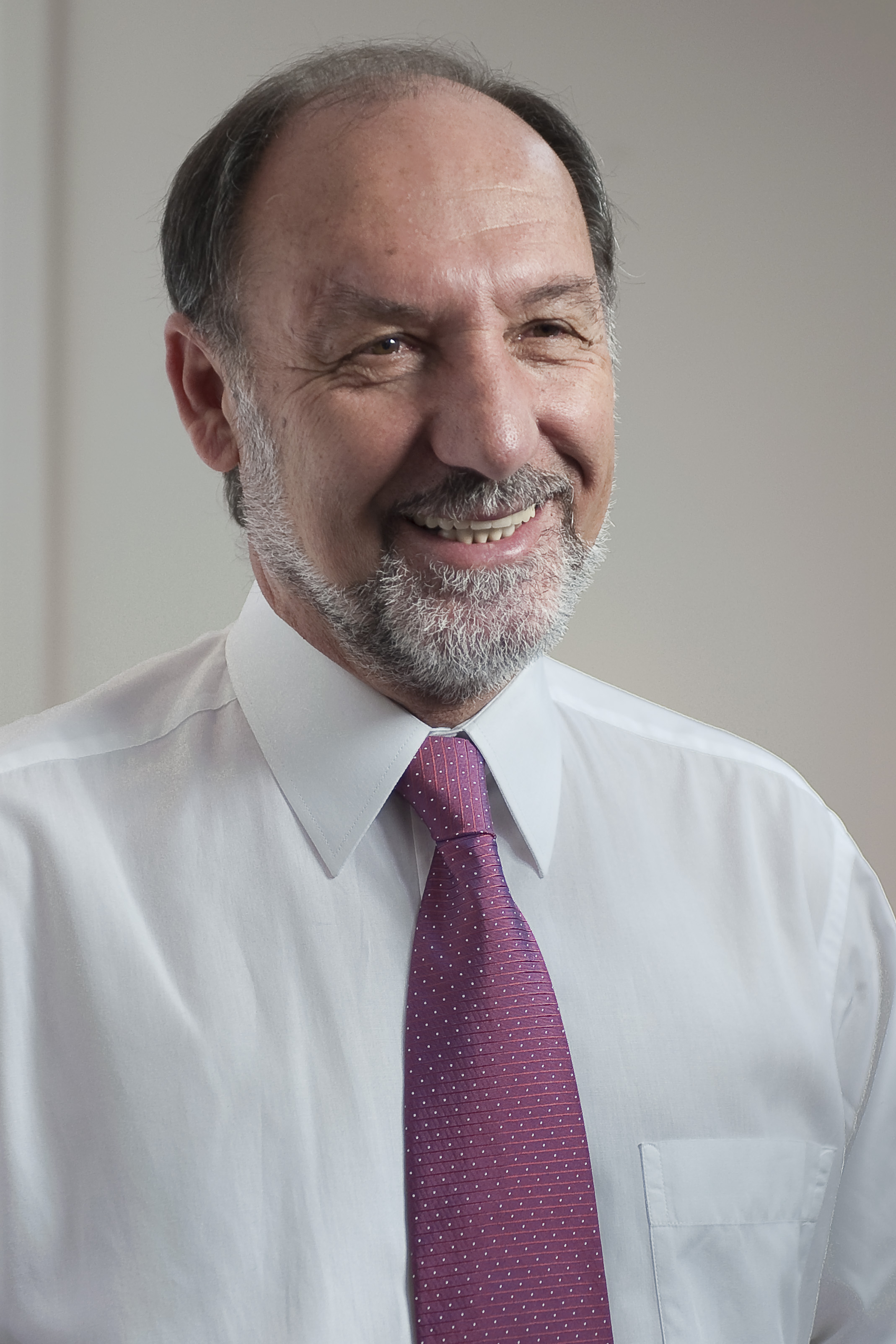
Robson Gomes

Jair Antonio Meneguelli (born 16 July 1947) is a Brazilian politician and former trade union leader.

Born in São Caetano do Sul, Meneguelli studied at the Colégio Barão do Rio Branco before becoming a toolmaker. He found work with Willys Overland, which soon became part of Ford of Brazil. In 1977, he joined the ABC Metalworkers' Union, and the following year he took part in a major campaign for wage increases. Through this, he came to know Lula, and Meneguelli was a founder member of the Workers' Party (PT) in 1980.

In 1981, Meneguelli became president of the Metalworkers' Union, after Lula had been removed from office by the government. Two years later, he took it into the new Central Única dos Trabalhadores (CUT), and at the first CUT congress, in 1984, he was elected as its president. The CUT played a leading role in increasing industrial action, culminating in the 1986 general strike. In 1987, he stood down from the Metalworkers' Union, to focus on the CUT and the PT.

Meneguelli stood down as leader of the CUT in 1994, and was elected as a deputy in the 1994 Brazilian general election. In 1995/96, he also served as deputy leader of PT. In 2000, he unsuccessfully ran to become mayor of São Caetano do Sul. He lost his parliamentary seat in 2002, being appointed as president of the Industrial Social Services.

Trade union offices
Preceded by New position	President of the Central Única dos Trabalhadores; 1984–1994	Succeeded by Vicente Paulo da Silva
