= Macambira =

Municipality in Sergipe, Brazil

Coordinates: 10°39′57″S 37°32′27″W

- Municipality
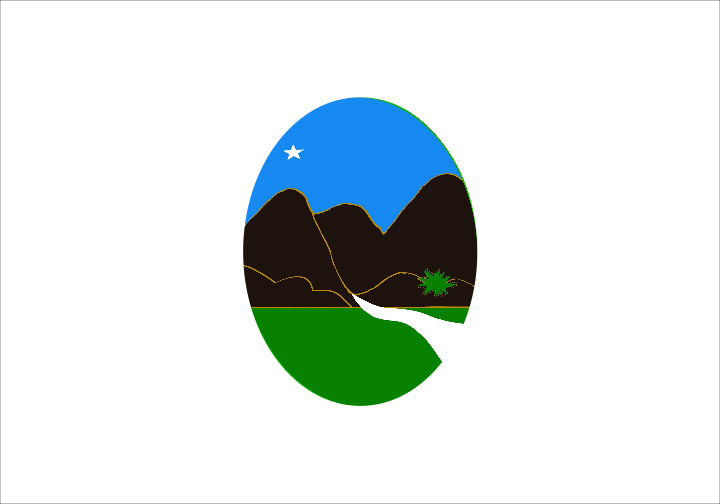
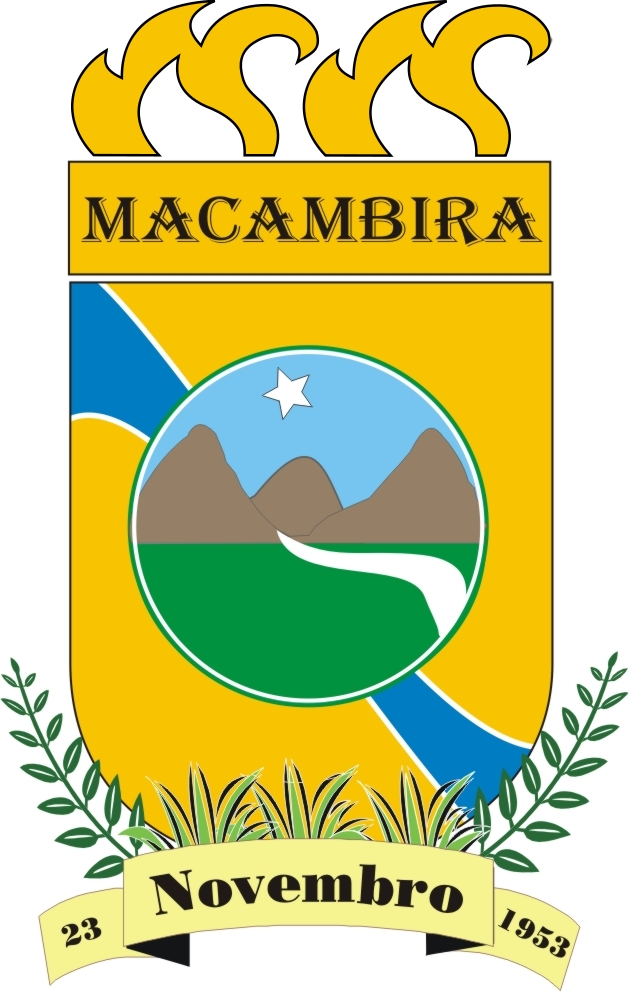
- Flag Coat of arms
- Interactive map of Macambira
- Country: Brazil
- Time zone: UTC−3 (BRT)

Macambira (Brazilian Portuguese pronunciation: [mɐkɐ̃ˈbiɾɐ]) is a municipality located in the Brazilian state of Sergipe. Its population was 6,961 (2020) and its area is 137 km^{2} (53 sq mi).

== See also ==
- List of municipalities in Sergipe
