= Luiz Marinho =

Brazilian politician (born 1959)

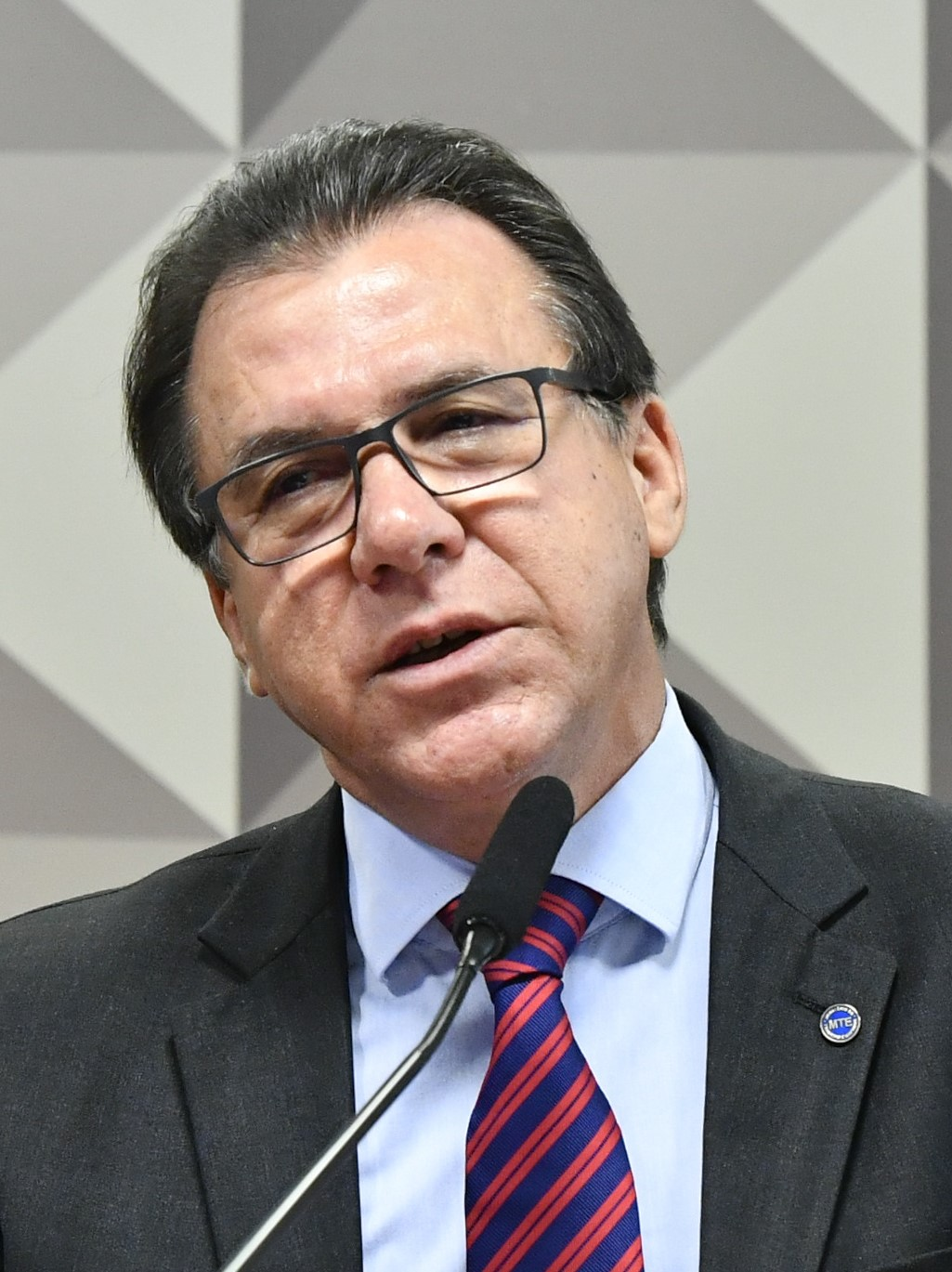
- Marinho in 2023.

Minister of Labour
- Incumbent
- Assumed office 1 January 2023
- President: Luiz Inácio Lula da Silva
- Preceded by: José Carlos Oliveira
- In office 12 July 2005 – 29 March 2007
- President: Luiz Inácio Lula da Silva
- Preceded by: Ricardo Berzoini
- Succeeded by: Carlos Lupi

President of the Workers' Party of São Paulo
- Incumbent
- Assumed office 8 May 2017
- Preceded by: Emídio de Souza

Mayor of São Bernardo do Campo
- In office 1 January 2009 – 1 January 2017
- Vice Mayor: Frank Aguiar
- Preceded by: William Dib
- Succeeded by: Orlando Morando

Minister of Social Security
- In office 29 March 2007 – 3 June 2008
- President: Luiz Inácio Lula da Silva
- Preceded by: Nelson Machado
- Succeeded by: José Pimentel

Personal details
- Born: Luiz Marinho; 20 May 1959 (age 66) Cosmorama, SP, Brazil
- Party: PT (1980–present)
- Spouse: Nilza de Oliveira
- Profession: Unionist

Luiz Marinho (born 20 May 1959 in Cosmorama) is a Brazilian politician and unionist. He was minister of Labor and Employment and minister of Social Security in the government of president Luiz Inácio Lula da Silva. He also was mayor of São Bernardo do Campo between 2009 and 2017.

== Biography ==
Marinho is married to Nilza de Oliveira and is the father of two children. He has a Bachelor of Law degree and was a metalworker in the 1970s, when met Lula da Silva. The first and only register in his work permit is from July 1978, when he was hired to work in the painting sector of Volkswagen in São Bernardo do Campo, where he also began his unionist career as member of the Internal Commission of Accidente Prevention (CIPA).

== Awards ==
Among the public acknowledgments, Marinho collects the Highlight of the Year Award of 1999, granted by the magazine Livre Mercado.

Also in 1999, he was appointed by Time/CNN as one of the 50 Latin American Leaders for the New Millennium, because of his negotiations with Volkswagen, which avoided the dismissal of 10,000 workers.

Trade union offices
Preceded by João Antonio Felicio	President of the Central Única dos Trabalhadores; 2003–2005	Succeeded by João Antonio Felicio
Political offices
Preceded by Ricardo Berzoini	Minister of Labor and Employment; 2005–2007	Succeeded by Carlos Lupi
Preceded by Nelson Machado	Minister of Social Security; 2007–2008	Succeeded by José Pimentel
Preceded by William Dib	17th Mayor of São Bernardo do Campo; 2009–2017	Succeeded by Orlando Morando
Party political offices
Preceded by Emídio de Souza	President of the Workers' Party of São Paulo; 2017–present	Incumbent
Preceded by Alexandre Padilha	PT nominee for Governor of São Paulo; 2018	Succeeded by Fernando Haddad
