= Central Única dos Trabalhadores =

Brazilian trade union center

CUT
- Unified Workers' Central
- Central Única dos Trabalhadores

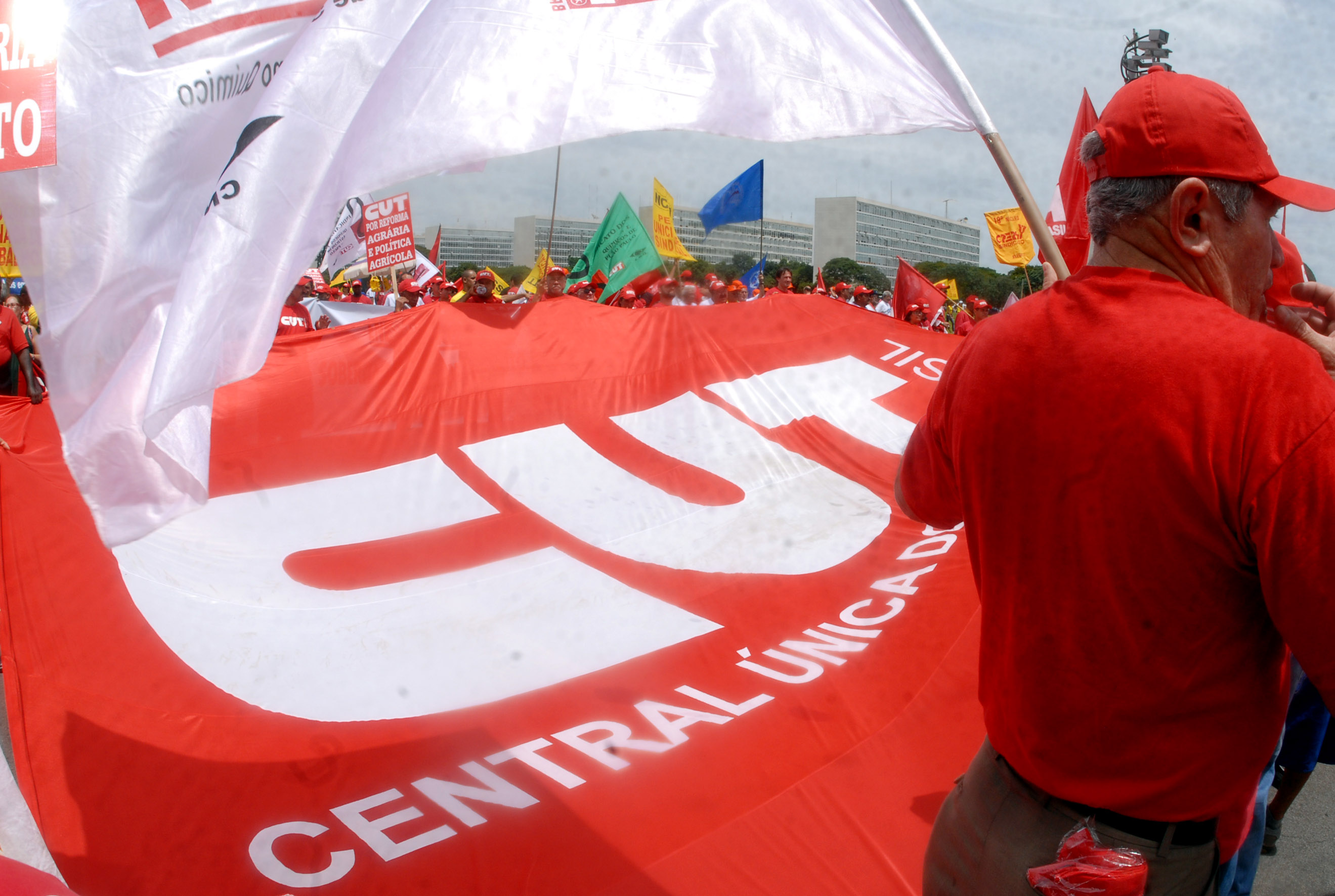
- Founded: 28 August 1983
- Headquarters: São Paulo, Brazil
- Location: Brazil
- Members: Approx. 7.5 million
- Key people: Sergio Nobre, President
- Affiliations: ITUC; Progressive International
- Website: www.cut.org.br

Central Única dos Trabalhadores (English: Unified Workers' Central), commonly known by the acronym CUT, is the main national trade union center in Brazil.

== History ==
CUT was formed on 28 August 1983 in São Bernardo do Campo, São Paulo, during the First National Congress of the Working Class. Alongside the Workers' Party (PT) and the Landless Workers' Movement (MST), CUT was one of the key organizations to challenge the military rule of 1964–1985 during its final stages, organizing strikes in automobile factories located in the ABC Region.

Nowadays, CUT is the largest and most important trade union federation in Brazil, representing over 7.4 million workers in all productive areas. It is also the largest trade union center in Latin America and the fifth largest in the world. Nevertheless, it continues to face obstacles because of corporatist laws that curb the workers' rights to organize. CUT generally supports a democratic socialist political ideology and is close to PT and its leaders, many of which had been union leaders in the past.

CUT was organized to oppose the so-called "old labour movement", associated with the late President Getúlio Vargas and his Brazilian Labour Party (PTB). The main practice of varguismo and its leaders was to try to integrate trade unions and the Ministry of Labor, once the President had based his policy for the area using the Carta del Lavoro of Fascist Italy as a role model. CUT arose as an alternative to this model, claiming to be part of the "new labour movement", independent from the federal government. However, its close ties with PT made CUT a source of criticism after Luiz Inácio Lula da Silva, PT's most prominent member, took office as President.

In March 2004, some union leaders unsatisfied with the organization's close ties with the Lula administration split from CUT in order to form the Coordenação Nacional de Lutas (Conlutas, English: National Coordination of Struggles). Conlutas represents between 30 and 40 percent of the CUT leadership, and it is closer to the United Socialist Workers' Party (PSTU) and the Socialism and Liberty Party (PSOL) – dissidences of PT themselves – than PT. The following year, leaders tied to PSOL and the Brazilian Communist Party (PCB) formed the Instrumento de Luta e Organização da Classe Trabalhadora (Intersindical, English: Instrument of Struggle and Organisation of the Working Class) and, in 2007, leaders linked to the Communist Party of Brazil (PCdoB) formed the Central dos Trabalhadores e Trabalhadoras do Brasil (CTB, English: Central of Male and Female Workers of Brazil).

== Affiliates ==
The following federations are affiliated to CUT:

Union	Abbreviation
Confederation of Technical and University Workers	CONFETU
Confederation of Workers in the Federal Public Service	CONDSEF
Confederation of Workers in the Municipal Public Service	CONFETAM
Democratic Brazilian Confederation of Workers in the Food Industry	CONTAC
National Confederation of Construction Workers' Unions	CONTICOM
National Confederation of Education Workers	CNTE
National Confederation of Family Farming Workers	CONTRAF BRASIL
National Confederation of Financial Workers	CONTRAF
National Confederation of Metallurgists	CNM
National Confederation of Social Security Workers	CNTSS
National Confederation of the Chemical Branch	CNQ
National Confederation of Transport and Logistics Workers	CNTTL
National Confederation of Vigilant Workers and Service Providers	CNTV-PS
National Confederation of Workers in the Apparel Industry	CNTRV
National Confederation of Workers in Commerce and Services	CONTRACS
National Federation of Journalists	FENAJ
National Federation of Retired and Retired Workers	FENAPI
National Federation of State and Federal District Employees and Public Employees	FENASEPE
National Federation of Technical Assistance and Rural Extension and Public Sector Workers	FASER
National Federation of Workers in Data Processing Companies	FENADADOS

== Leadership ==
=== Presidents ===
1983: Jair Meneguelli
1994: Vicente Paulo da Silva
2000: João Felicio
2003: Luiz Marinho
2005: João Felicio
2006: Artur Henrique da Silva Santos
2012: Vagner Freitas
2019: Sérgio Nobre

=== General Secretaries ===
1983: Paulo Paim
Gilmar Carneiro
1997: João Antonio Felicio
2000: Carlos Alberto Grana
2003: João Antonio Felicio
2005: Artur Henrique da Silva Santos
2006: Quintino Severo
2012: Sérgio Nobre
2019: Carmen Foro

== See also ==
- Confederação Geral dos Trabalhadores
- Força Sindical

== Sources ==
- ICTUR; et al., eds. (2005). Trade Unions of the World (6th ed.). London, UK: John Harper Publishing. ISBN 978-0-9543811-5-8.
