= Pedro Fernandes =

Pedro Fernandes may refer to:

- Pedro Fernandes de Queirós (1563–1614), Portuguese navigator in the service of Spain
- Pedro Fernandes Ribeiro (born 1949), Brazilian Labor Party politician
- Pedro Fernandes (footballer) (born 1985), Pedro Emanuel da Silva Fernandes, Portuguese footballer
- Pedro Fernandes Lopes (born 1986), Cape Verdean politician
- Pedro Fernandes Neto (politician), Democratic Labor Party candidate in the 2018 Rio de Janeiro gubernatorial election
- Pedro Fernandes Neto, Brazilian physician known for his work with venous translucence
