= Pedro Fernandes Ribeiro =

Brazilian engineer and politician (born 1949)

Pedro Fernandes
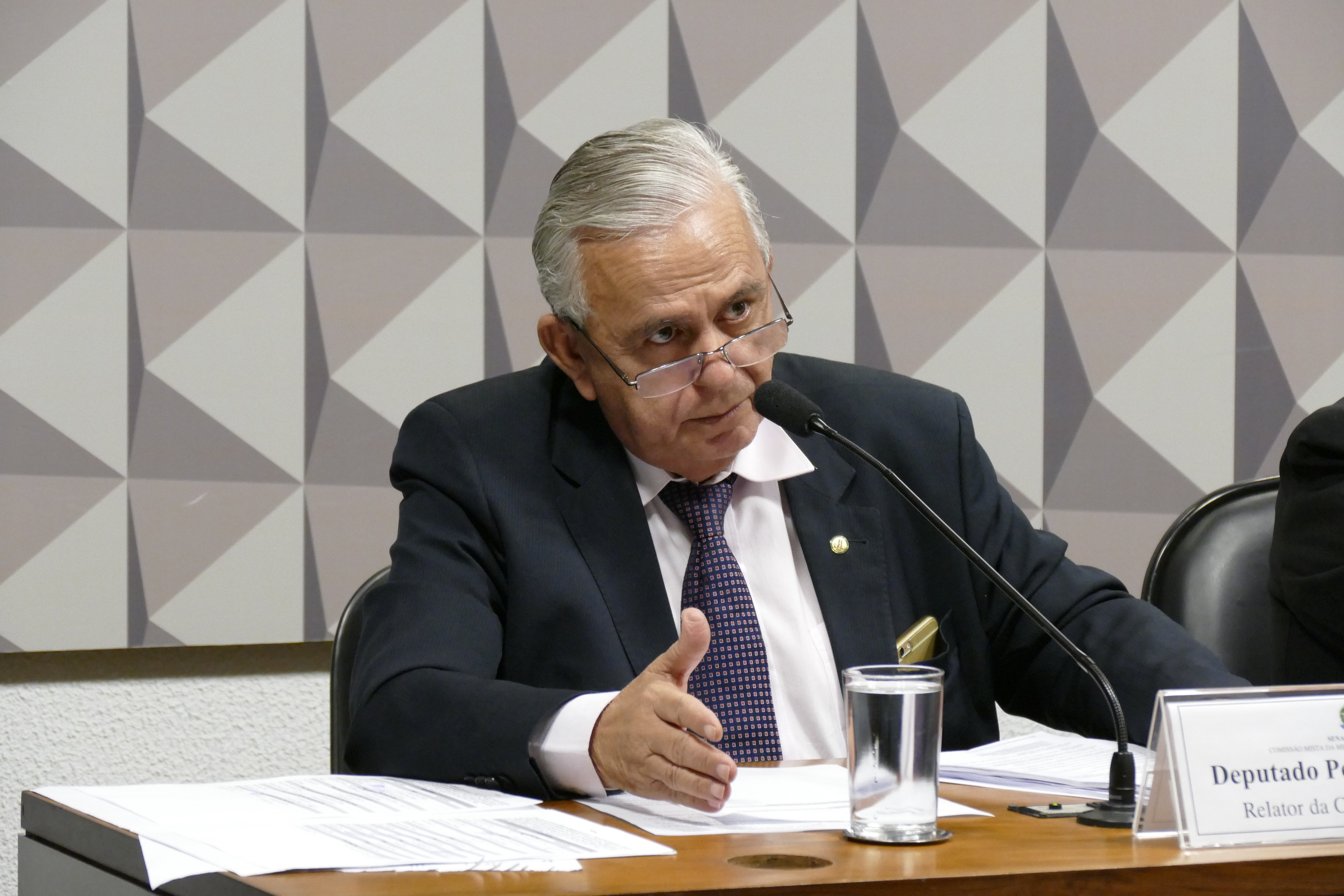

Federal Deputy from Maranhão
- Incumbent
- Assumed office 1 February 1999

Personal details
- Born: Pedro Fernandes Ribeiro; 2 March 1949 (age 77) São Luís, MA, Brazil
- Party: PTB (Since 2003); PFL (2002–2003); PSD (1993–2002); PFL (1988–1993); PDS (1980–1988); ARENA (1965–1980); PSP (1960–1965)
- Children: Pedro Lucas Fernandes
- Parents: Manoel Nunes Ribeiro (father); Raimunda Fernandes Ribeiro (mother)
- Education: State University of Maranhão
- Profession: Engineer

Pedro Fernandes Ribeiro, mostly known as Pedro Fernandes (born 2 March 1949), is a Brazilian engineer and politician, member of the Brazilian Labor Party (PTB).

In 2016, was the president of the Inquiry Parliamentary Committee of the Administration Council of Tax Appeals (CARF).

On 17 April 2016, voted against the impeachment of president Dilma Rousseff. Later, voted "Yes" for the Bill of the Ceiling of Public Spendings. In April 2017, was in favor of the Labor Reform.

In August 2017, voted against the sue which asked for opening of investigation against president Michel Temer, helping archive the complaint of the Federal Public Prosecutor's Office (MPF). In October 2017, also voted against the second complaint against president Temer and ministers Eliseu Padilha and Moreira Franco.

On 27 December 2017, Fernandes was announced Minister of Employment after the resignation of Ronaldo Nogueira. He was confirmed after a meeting with Chief of Staff Eliseu Padilha, Secretary-General of the Presidency Moreira Franco, National President of the PTB Roberto Jefferson and leader of PTB in the Chamber Jovair Arantes. On 2 January 2017, president Temer canceled Fernandes' nomination after divergences with councilor and former senator José Sarney.
