= Marcus Vinícius Neskau =

Brazilian politician (born 1973)

President of the Brazilian Labour Party
- In office 11 February 2022 – 29 March 2022
- Preceded by: Graciela Nienov
- Succeeded by: Kassyo Santos Ramos

Personal details
- Born: 12 February 1973 (age 53)
- Party: Democratic Renewal Party (since 2023)
- Other political affiliations: Brazilian Labour Party (1998–2023)
- Relatives: Cristiane Brasil (sister-in-law); Roberto Jefferson (father-in-law)

Marcus Vinícius de Vasconcelos Ferreira (born 12 February 1973), better known as Marcus Vinícius Neskau, is a Brazilian politician serving as treasurer of the Democratic Renewal Party since 2023. In 2022, he served as president of the Brazilian Labour Party. From 2008 to 2022, he was a member of the Legislative Assembly of Rio de Janeiro. From 2013 to 2014, he served as secretary of healthy aging and quality of life of Rio de Janeiro. In the 2022 general election, he was a candidate for the Chamber of Deputies. He is the son-in-law of Roberto Jefferson and the brother-in-law of Cristiane Brasil.
