= Ministry of Social Security (Brazil) =

- Portuguese: Ministério da Previdência Social

Agency overview
- Formed: 2 May 1974; 51 years ago
- Type: Ministry
- Jurisdiction: Federal government of Brazil
- Headquarters: Esplanada dos Ministérios, Bloco F Brasília, Federal District
- Annual budget: $883 b BRL (2023)
- Agency executives: Wolney Queiroz, Minister; Vacant, Executive-Secretary; Paulo dos Santos Pinto, Secretary of Self and Complementary Tax Rates; Adroaldo da Cunha Portal, Secretary of Social Security General Tax Rates
- Website: www.gov.br/previdencia/

The Ministry of Social Security (Portuguese: Ministério da Previdência Social, abbreviated MPS) is a cabinet-level federal ministry in Brazil. On 2 October 2015, it was fused with the Ministry of Labor and Employment, becoming the Ministry of Labor, Employment and Social Security. It was later recreated by president Luiz Inácio Lula da Silva in 2023. The incumbent minister is Wolney Queiroz.

== List of ministers ==
| No. | Portrait | Minister | Took office | Left office | Time in office | Party | President |
|---|---|---|---|---|---|---|---|
| 1 | Arnaldo da Costa Prieto | Arnaldo da Costa Prieto (1930–2012) | 2 May 1974 | 4 July 1974 | 63 days | ARENA | Ernesto Geisel (ARENA) |
| 2 | Luiz Gonzaga do Nascimento e Silva | Luiz Gonzaga do Nascimento e Silva (1915–2003) | 4 July 1974 | 15 March 1979 | 4 years, 254 days | Independent | Ernesto Geisel (ARENA) |
| 3 | Jair Soares | Jair Soares (born 1933) | 15 March 1979 | 7 May 1982 | 3 years, 53 days | ARENA | João Figueiredo (ARENA) |
| 4 | Hélio Beltrão | Hélio Beltrão (1916–1997) | 10 May 1982 | 11 November 1983 | 1 year, 185 days | PDS | João Figueiredo (PDS) |
| 5 | Jarbas Passarinho | Jarbas Passarinho (1920–2016) | 11 November 1983 | 15 March 1985 | 1 year, 124 days | PDS | João Figueiredo (PDS) |
| 6 | Waldir Pires | Waldir Pires (1926–2018) | 15 March 1985 | 13 February 1986 | 335 days | MDB | José Sarney (MDB) |
| 7 | Raphael de Almeida Magalhães | Raphael de Almeida Magalhães (1930–2011) | 18 February 1986 | 22 October 1987 | 1 year, 246 days | PFL | José Sarney (MDB) |
| 8 | Renato Archer | Renato Archer (1922–1996) | 27 October 1987 | 28 July 1988 | 275 days | MDB | José Sarney (MDB) |
| 9 | Jader Barbalho | Jader Barbalho (born 1944) | 28 July 1988 | 15 March 1990 | 1 year, 230 days | MDB | José Sarney (MDB) |
| 10 | Antônio Rogério Magri | Antônio Rogério Magri (born 1940) | 15 March 1990 | 21 January 1992 | 1 year, 310 days | PTB | Fernando Collor (PRN) |
| 11 | Reinhold Stephanes | Reinhold Stephanes (born 1939) | 21 January 1992 | 2 October 1992 | 255 days | PFL | Fernando Collor (PRN) |
| 12 | Antônio Britto | Antônio Britto (born 1952) | 15 October 1992 | 15 December 1993 | 1 year, 61 days | MDB | Itamar Franco (MDB) |
| 13 | Sérgio Cutolo | Sérgio Cutolo (born 1952) | 15 December 1993 | 1 January 1995 | 1 year, 17 days | Independent | Itamar Franco (MDB) |
| 14 | Reinhold Stephanes | Reinhold Stephanes (born 1939) | 1 January 1995 | 3 April 1998 | 3 years, 92 days | MDB | Fernando Henrique Cardoso (PSDB) |
| 15 | Waldeck Ornelas | Waldeck Ornelas (born 1945) | 7 April 1998 | 24 February 2001 | 2 years, 323 days | PFL | Fernando Henrique Cardoso (PSDB) |
| 16 | Roberto Brandt | Roberto Brandt (born 1942) | 13 March 2001 | 8 March 2002 | 360 days | PFL | Fernando Henrique Cardoso (PSDB) |
| 17 | José Cechin | José Cechin (born 1951) | 8 March 2002 | 1 January 2003 | 299 days | Independent | Fernando Henrique Cardoso (PSDB) |
| 18 | Ricardo Berzoini | Ricardo Berzoini (born 1960) | 1 January 2003 | 23 January 2004 | 1 year, 22 days | PT | Luiz Inácio Lula da Silva (PT) |
| 19 | Amir Lando | Amir Lando (born 1944) | 23 January 2004 | 22 March 2005 | 1 year, 58 days | MDB | Luiz Inácio Lula da Silva (PT) |
| 20 | Romero Jucá | Romero Jucá (born 1954) | 22 March 2005 | 21 July 2005 | 121 days | MDB | Luiz Inácio Lula da Silva (PT) |
| 21 | Nelson Machado | Nelson Machado (born 1948) | 21 July 2005 | 29 March 2007 | 1 year, 251 days | Independent | Luiz Inácio Lula da Silva (PT) |
| 22 | Luiz Marinho | Luiz Marinho (born 1959) | 29 March 2007 | 3 June 2008 | 1 year, 66 days | PT | Luiz Inácio Lula da Silva (PT) |
| – | Carlos Eduardo Gabas | Carlos Eduardo Gabas (born 1965); Acting | 3 June 2008 | 11 June 2008 | 8 days | PT | Luiz Inácio Lula da Silva (PT) |
| 23 | José Pimentel | José Pimentel (born 1953) | 11 June 2008 | 30 March 2010 | 1 year, 292 days | PT | Luiz Inácio Lula da Silva (PT) |
| 24 | Carlos Eduardo Gabas | Carlos Eduardo Gabas (born 1965) | 30 March 2010 | 1 January 2011 | 277 days | PT | Luiz Inácio Lula da Silva (PT) |
| 25 | Garibaldi Alves Filho | Garibaldi Alves Filho (born 1947) | 1 January 2011 | 1 January 2015 | 4 years, 0 days | MDB | Dilma Rousseff (PT) |
| 26 | Carlos Eduardo Gabas | Carlos Eduardo Gabas (born 1965) | 1 January 2015 | 2 October 2015 | 274 days | PT | Dilma Rousseff (PT) |
| 27 | Carlos Lupi | Carlos Lupi (born 1957) | 1 January 2023 | 2 May 2025 | 2 years, 121 days | PDT | Luiz Inácio Lula da Silva (PT) |
| 28 | Wolney Queiroz | Wolney Queiroz (born 1972) | 2 May 2025 | Incumbent | 0 days | PDT | Luiz Inácio Lula da Silva (PT) |

== See also ==
- Other ministries of Social Security
- Social security in Brazil
