= Caio Vieira de Mello =

Brazilian lawyer and judge (born 1949)

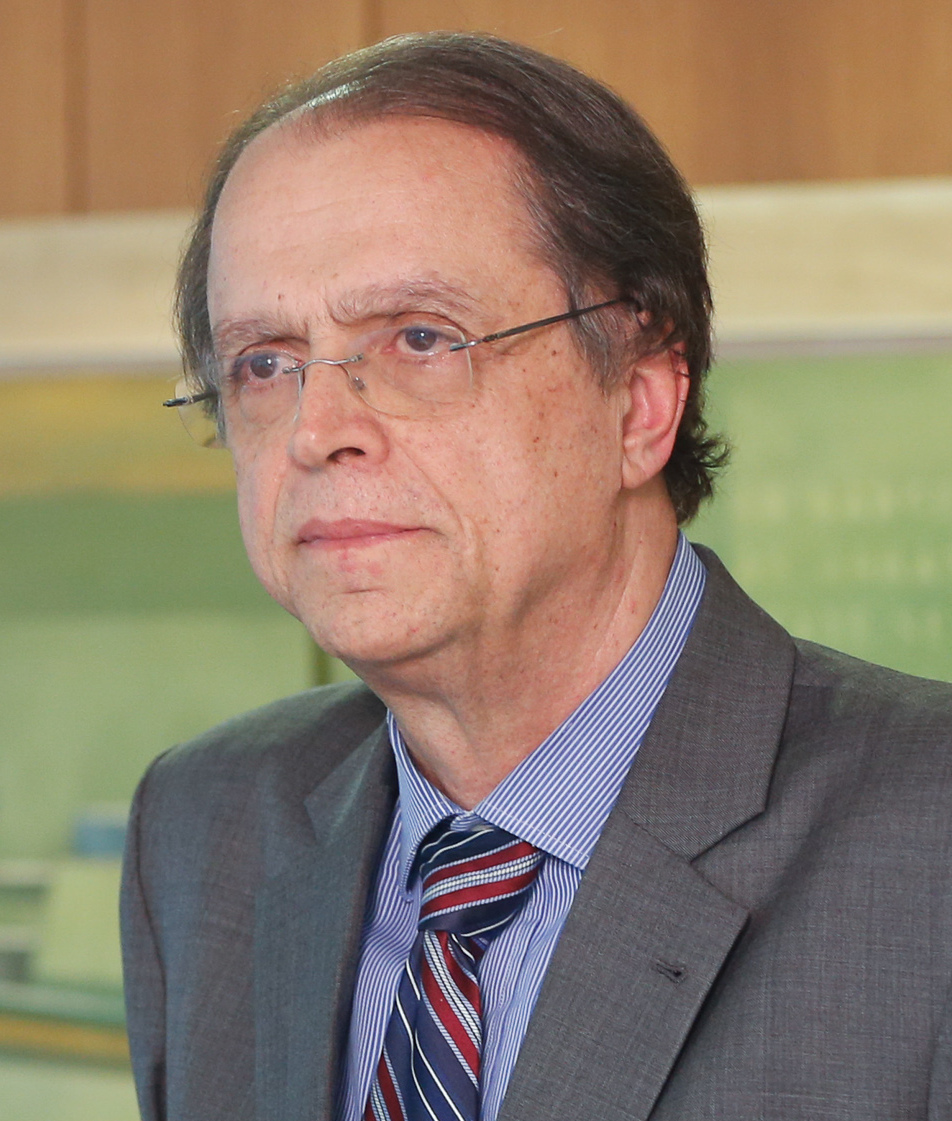

Minister of Labor
- In office 10 July 2018 – 31 December 2018
- Preceded by: Helton Yomura
- Succeeded by: Onyx Lorenzoni (2021)

Personal details
- Born: Caio Luiz de Almeida Vieira de Mello; 23 July 1949 (age 77) Rio de Janeiro, Brazil
- Education: Federal University of Minas Gerais
- Occupation: Lawyer, ex-desembargador

Caio Luiz de Almeida Vieira de Mello (born 23 July 1949) is a Brazilian lawyer, former desembargador, and the former Minister of Labor.

He assumed the role on 10 July 2018 as a substitute to interim minister Eliseu Padilha. He succeeded Helton Yomura, who had been removed from office by justice of the Supreme Federal Court Edson Fachin.
