= Cristiane Brasil =

Brazilian lawyer and politician (born 1973)

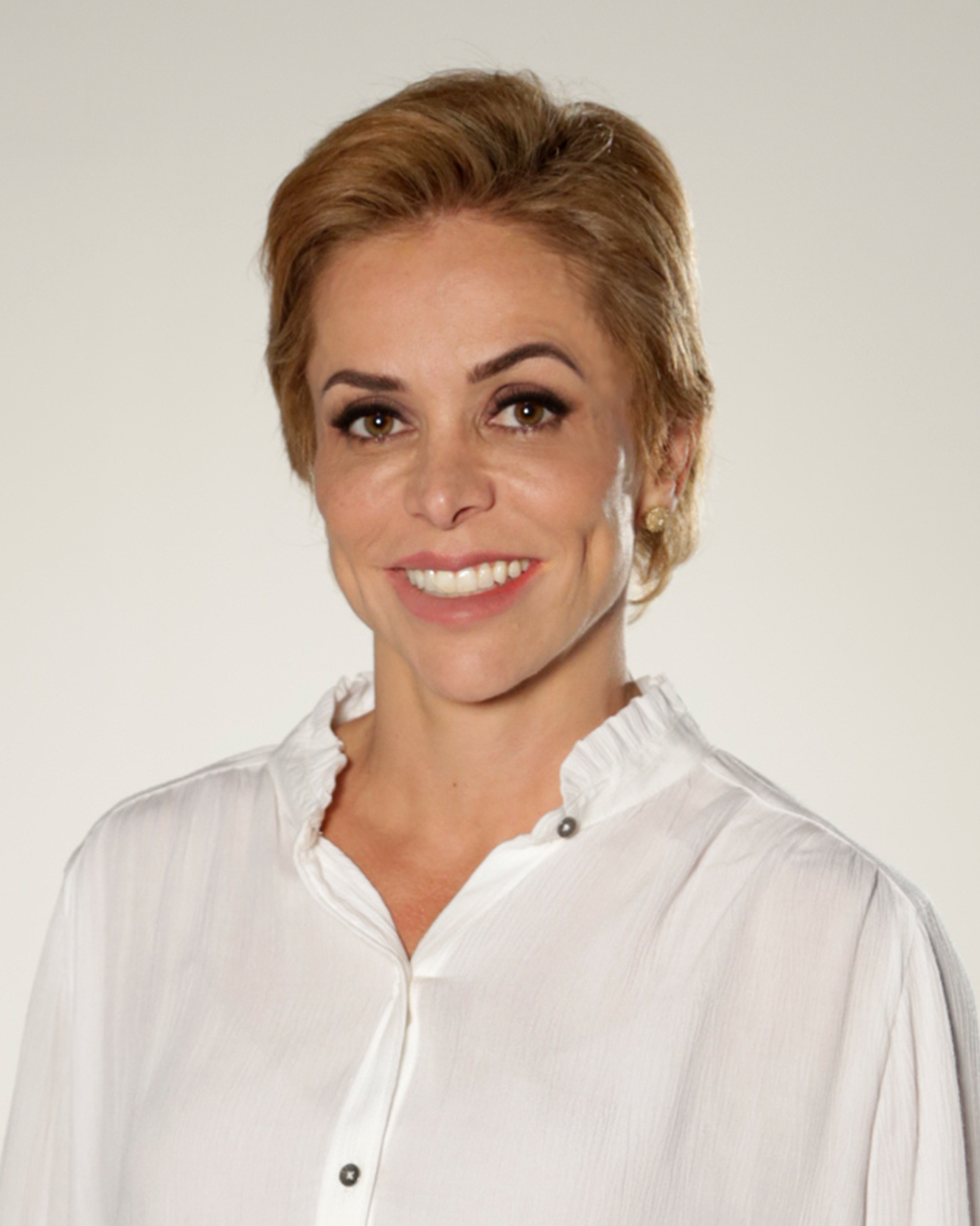

Minister of Labour and Employment Nominated
- In office Never sworn in (Note: Cristiane had her sworn-in suspended between 3 January and 23 February 2018 and never officially took office.)
- President: Michel Temer
- Preceded by: Ronaldo Nogueira
- Succeeded by: Helton Yomura

Member of the Chamber of Deputies
- In office 1 February 2015 – 1 February 2019
- Constituency: Rio de Janeiro

National President of PTB
- In office 24 February 2014 – 14 April 2016
- Preceded by: Roberto Jefferson
- Succeeded by: Roberto Jefferson

City Councilor of Rio de Janeiro
- In office 1 January 2005 – 1 February 2015

Personal details
- Born: Cristiane Brasil Francisco; 21 December 1973 (age 52) Petrópolis, Rio de Janeiro, Brazil
- Party: PRD (2023–present)
- Other political affiliations: PTB (2003–2023)
- Parents: Roberto Jefferson (father); Ecila Brasil da Silva (mother)
- Relatives: Fabiana Brasil (sister); Roberto Francisco Neto (brother)
- Education: Catholic University of Petrópolis (LL.B.)
- Occupation: Lawyer

Cristiane Brasil Francisco, commonly known as Cristiane Brasil (born 21 December 1973), is a Brazilian lawyer and politician. Former member of the Brazilian Labor Party (PTB), had been Federal Deputy, representing the state of Rio de Janeiro between 2015 and 2019, and was nominated as Minister of Labour in January 2018, but the Federal Justice suspended the take up of office.

== Biography ==
Born in Petrópolis, mountain region of the state of Rio de Janeiro, Cristiane Brasil graduated in Law in the Catholic University of Petrópolis. In 2005, took office as city councillor for the first time, being reelected for two more terms. In 2009, took office as City Special Secretary of Healthy Aging and Life Quality of Rio de Janeiro. In the 2014 state elections, was elected federal deputy with 81,817 votes.

She voted favorable to the impeachment proceedings against Dilma Rousseff, to the Bill of Ceiling of Public Spendings and the outsourcing for all activities, and to the Labor Reform. On August and October 2017, Cristiane voted to reject two complaint from the former Prosecutor General Rodrigo Janot against president Michel Temer, successfully archiving both.

Cristiane was nominated by president Temer to the Ministry of Employment after the resignation of Ronaldo Nogueira, but Justice forbade her to assume. On 20 January, Justice Humberto Martins, Deputy Chief Justice of the Superior Court of Justice, granted an injunction from the Attorney General of the Union Grace Mendonça, authorizing Brasil's inauguration, scheduled for 22 January 2018. In the late night of 22 January, President of the Supreme Federal Court, Cármen Lúcia, granted a petition from Labour Independent Lawyers Movement (MATI), suspending, again, her inauguration.

== Notes ==
Party political offices
Preceded by Roberto Jefferson	National President of Brazilian Labour Party; 2014–2016	Succeeded by Roberto Jefferson
