= Ministry of Social Solidarity and Inclusion (Timor-Leste) =

Ministry in the government of Timor-Leste

- Ministério da Solidariedade Social e Inclusão (Portuguese); Ministériu Solidariedade Sosiál no Inkluzaun (Tetum)
- Coat of Arms of Timor-Leste

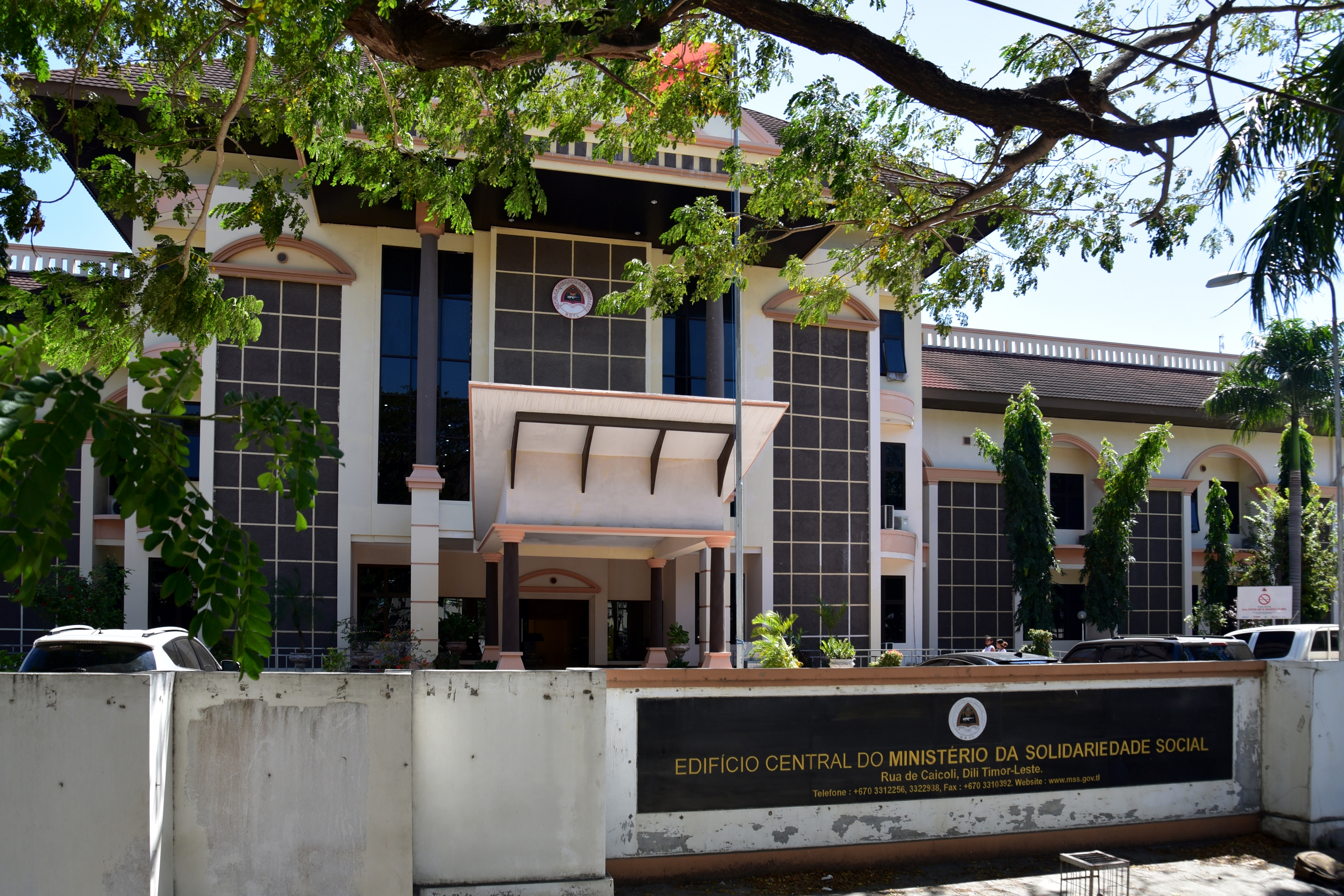
- Central Office of the Ministry

Ministry overview
- Formed: 2007
- Jurisdiction: Government of Timor-Leste
- Headquarters: Rua de Caicoli, Dili; 8°33′34.5″S 125°34′21.5″E
- Minister responsible: Verónica das Dores, Minister of Social Solidarity and Inclusion
- Deputy Minister responsible: Céu Brites, Deputy Minister of Social Solidarity and Inclusion
- Website: Ministry of Social Solidarity and Inclusion
- Agency ID: MSSI

The Ministry of Social Solidarity and Inclusion (MSSI; Portuguese: Ministério da Solidariedade Social e Inclusão, Tetum: Ministériu Solidariedade Sosiál no Inkluzaun) is the government department of Timor-Leste accountable for social security and related matters.

== Functions ==
The Ministry is responsible for the design, implementation, coordination and evaluation of policy for the following areas:

- social security;
- social assistance; and
- community reintegration.

== Minister ==
The incumbent Minister of Social Solidarity and Inclusion is Verónica das Dores. She is assisted by Céu Brites, Deputy Minister of Solidarity and Inclusion. (Note: The Constitution of Timor-Leste provides, in sections 104 and 105, for the appointment of officials referred to in its English language version as "Deputy Ministers". In other English language publications, those officials are commonly referred to as "Vice Ministers", even though the word "Vice", in context, arguably has a different meaning in English from the word "Deputy". In this article, the constitutional expression "Deputy" is used.)

== See also ==
- List of social security ministries
- Politics of Timor-Leste
