= Ministry of Social Security =

A ministry of social security or department of social security is a government entity responsible for social security affairs. It may be a ministry office, a department, or, as in the United States, a nominally independent agency.

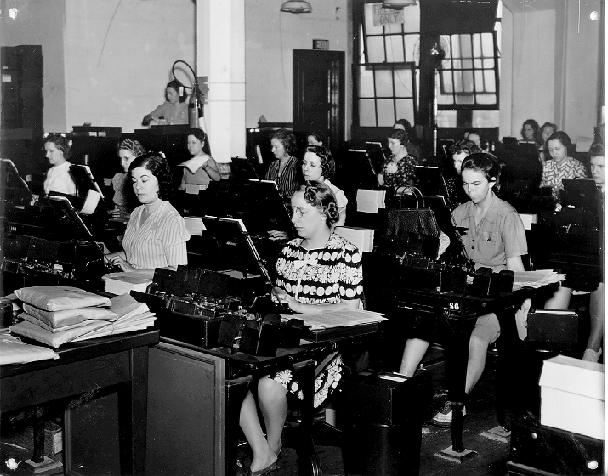
Keypunch operators at work, of the U.S. Social Security Administration

Notable ones are:

- Ministry of Labor and Social Security (Argentina)
- Department of Social Security (Australia) (defunct)
- Ministry of Social Security (Brazil)
- Ministry of Human Resources and Social Security (China)
- Ministry of Social Protection (Colombia)
- Federal Ministry for Health and Social Security (Germany)
- Ministry of Labor, Social Security, and Welfare (Greece)
- Ministry of Welfare (Iceland)
- Ministry of Labour and Employment (India)
- Ministry of Welfare and Social Security (Iran)
- Ministry of Labor and Social Security (Jamaica)
- Ministry of Social Security and Labor (Lithuania)
- Ministry of Social Affairs and Employment (Netherlands)
- Social Security System (Philippines)
- Ministry of Inclusion, Social Security and Migration (Spain)
- Ministry of Health and Social Affairs (Sweden)
- Ministry of Social Solidarity and Inclusion (Timor-Leste)
- Ministry of Labor and Social Security (Turkey)
- Department for Work and Pensions (UK)
  - Department of Social Security (1988–2001)
  - Department of Health and Social Security (1968–88)
  - Ministry of Social Security (1966–68)
- Social Security Administration (United States)

== See also ==
- Ministry of Social Security (North Korea), synonymous North Korean ministry responsible for ordinary policing.
- Ministry of Employment (disambiguation)
- Ministry of Health
- Ministry of Labor
- Ministry of Welfare (disambiguation)
- Social security
- Social Security Administration
