= Pedro Lucas Fernandes =

Brazilian politician (born 1979)

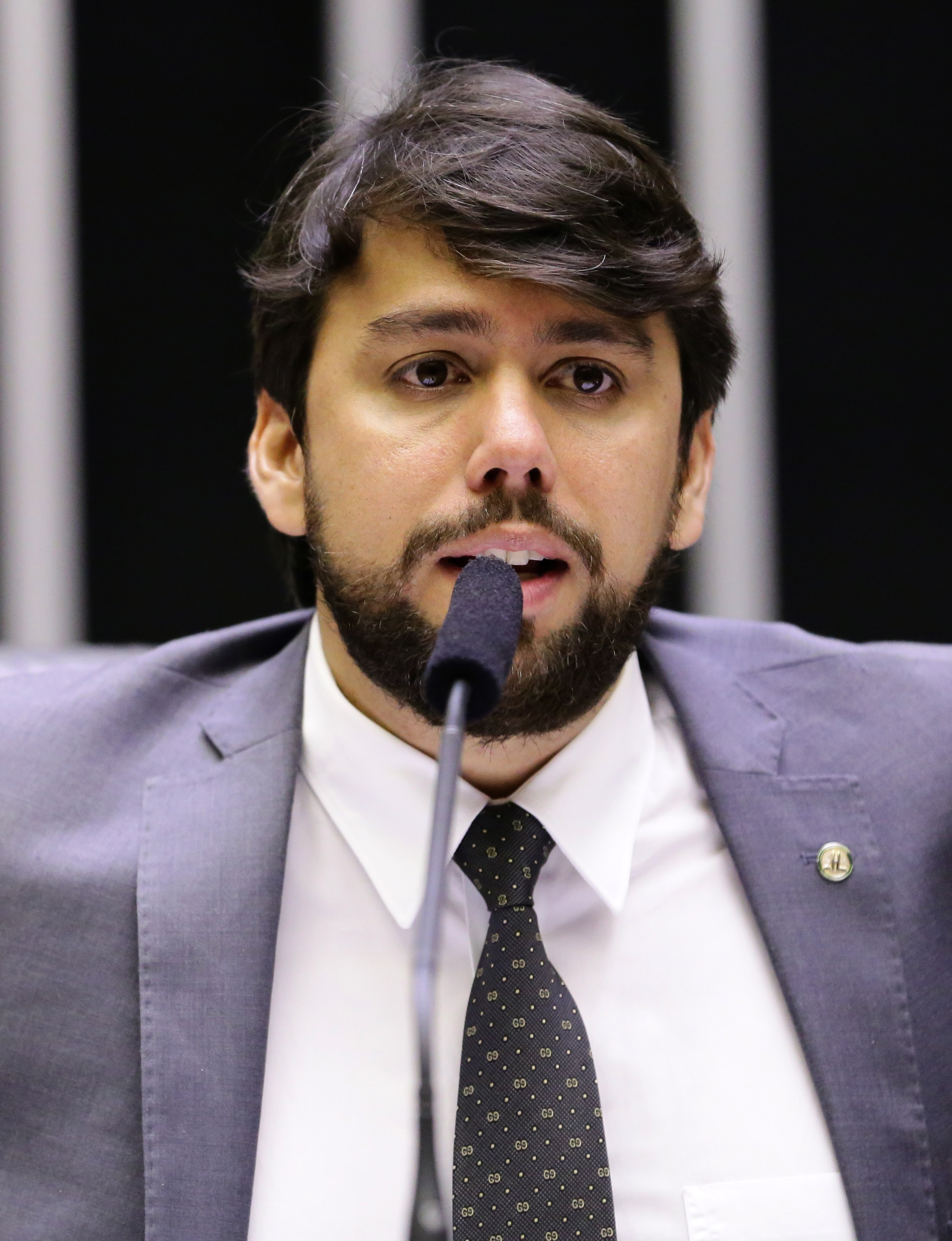
- Fernandes in 2019

Member of the Chamber of Deputies
- Incumbent
- Assumed office 1 February 2019
- Constituency: Maranhão

Member of the Municipal Chamber of São Luís
- In office 1 January 2013 – 1 February 2019
- Constituency: At-large

Personal details
- Born: Pedro Lucas Andrade Fernandes Ribeiro; 1 November 1979 (age 47) São Luís, Maranhão, Brazil
- Party: UNIÃO (since 2022)
- Other political affiliations: PTB (2003–2022)
- Parent: Pedro Fernandes Ribeiro (father)

Pedro Lucas Andrade Fernandes Ribeiro (born 1 November 1979) is a Brazilian politician serving as a member of the Chamber of Deputies since 2019. From 2013 to 2019, he was a municipal councillor of São Luís.
