= Carlos Lupi =

Brazilian politician (born 1957)

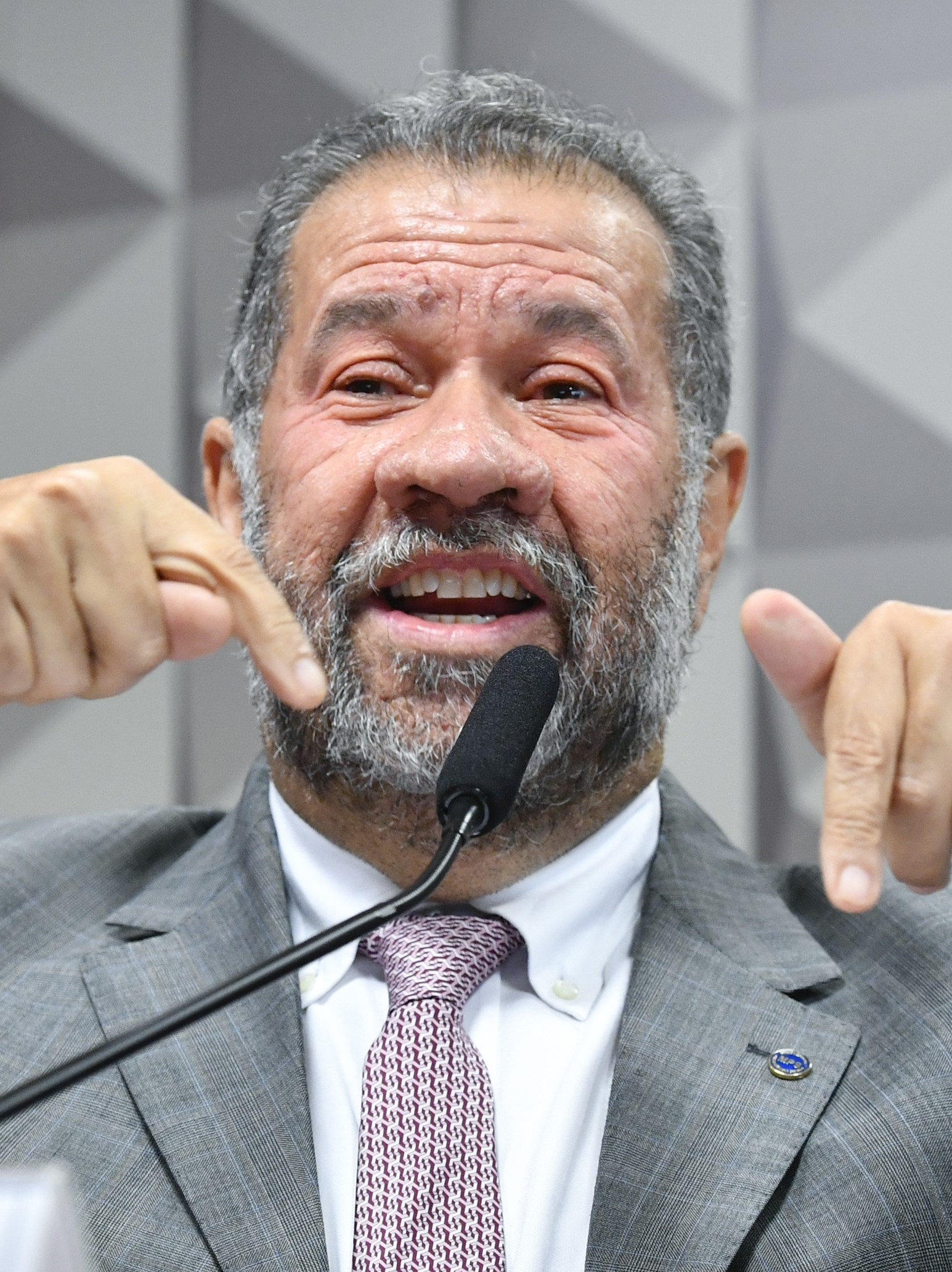
- Lupi in 2023

Minister of Social Security
- In office 1 January 2023 – 2 May 2025
- President: Luiz Inácio Lula da Silva
- Preceded by: Carlos Eduardo Gabas
- Succeeded by: Wolney Queiroz

President of the Democratic Labour Party
- Incumbent
- Assumed office 23 July 2004

Vice President of the Socialist International
- In office March 2017 – 25 November 2022
- President: George Papandreou

Ministry of Labour and Employment
- In office 29 March 2007 – 4 December 2011
- President: Luiz Inácio Lula da Silva; Dilma Rousseff
- Preceded by: Luiz Marinho
- Succeeded by: Paulo Roberto dos Santos Pinto

State Secretary of Government of Rio de Janeiro
- In office 1 January 1999 – 28 June 2000
- Governor: Anthony Garotinho

State Secretary of Transports of Rio de Janeiro
- In office November 1991 – July 1992
- Governor: Leonel Brizola

Federal Deputy
- In office 1 February 1991 – 1 February 1995
- Constituency: Rio de Janeiro

Personal details
- Born: 16 March 1957 (age 69) Campinas, São Paulo, Brazil
- Party: PDT (1980–present)
- Spouse: Ângela Maria Rocha

Carlos Roberto Lupi (born 16 March 1957) is a Brazilian professor and politician. He is the president of the Democratic Labour Party (PDT) and one of the vice presidents of the Socialist International (SI).

During Luiz Inácio Lula da Silva (PT) and Dilma Rousseff's (PT) government, he was the Minister of Labour and Employment between March 2007 and December 2011.

Lupi was also State Secretary of the Government of Rio de Janeiro, State Secretary of Transports of Rio de Janeiro and Federal Deputy for the same state.

Lupi also served as social security minister in the second presidency of Luiz Inácio Lula da Silva. He resigned on 2 May 2025 after a police investigation revealed long-term embezzlement of pension funds by the Instituto Nacional do Seguro Social.
