= Minister of Social Solidarity and Inclusion (Timor-Leste) =

East Timorese government minister

- Ministra da Solidariedade Social e Inclusão (Portuguese); Ministra Solidariedade Sosiál no Inkluzaun (Tetum)
- Coat of Arms of Timor-Leste

- Flag of Timor-Leste
- Incumbent; Verónica das Dores since 1 July 2023
- Ministry of Social Solidarity and Inclusion
- Style: Minister; (informal); Her Excellency; (formal, diplomatic)
- Member of: Constitutional Government
- Reports to: Prime Minister
- Appointer: President of Timor-Leste (following proposal by the Prime Minister of Timor-Leste)
- Inaugural holder: Maria Domingas Alves
- Formation: 2007
- Website: Ministry of Social Solidarity and Inclusion

The Minister of Social Solidarity and Inclusion (Portuguese: Ministra da Solidariedade Social e Inclusão, Tetum: Ministra Solidariedade Sosiál no Inkluzaun) is a senior member of the Constitutional Government of Timor-Leste heading the Ministry of Social Solidarity and Inclusion.

== Functions ==
Under the Constitution of Timor-Leste, the Minister has the power and the duty:

1. to implement the policy defined for the Ministry of Social Solidarity and Inclusion;
2. to ensure relations between the Government and the other organs of the State in the area of responsibility of the Ministry.

Where the Minister is in charge of the subject matter of a government statute, the Minister is also required, together with the Prime Minister, to sign the statute.

== Incumbent ==
The incumbent Minister of Social Solidarity and Inclusion is Verónica das Dores. She is assisted by Céu Brites, Deputy Minister of Solidarity and Inclusion. (Note: The Constitution of Timor-Leste provides, in sections 104 and 105, for the appointment of officials referred to in its English language version as "Deputy Ministers". In other English language publications, those officials are commonly referred to as "Vice Ministers", even though the word "Vice", in context, arguably has a different meaning in English from the word "Deputy". In this article, the constitutional expression "Deputy" is used.)

== List of ministers ==
The following individuals have been appointed as the minister:

No.	Party	Minister	Portrait	Title	Government (Prime Minister)	Term start	Term end	Term in office
1	Independent	Maria Domingas Alves		Minister of Social Solidarity	IV Constitutional (Gusmão)	8 August 2007	8 August 2012	5 years, 0 days
2	Independent	Isabel Guterres		Minister of Social Solidarity	V Constitutional (Gusmão)	8 August 2012	16 February 2015	5 years, 38 days
2	Independent	Isabel Guterres		Minister of Social Solidarity	VI Constitutional (Araújo)	16 February 2015	15 September 2017	5 years, 38 days
3	Fretilin	Florentina da Conceição Pereira Martins Smith		Minister of Social Solidarity	VII Constitutional (Alkatiri)	15 September 2017	22 June 2018	280 days
4	KHUNTO	Armanda Berta dos Santos		Minister of Social Solidarity and Inclusion	VIII Constitutional (Ruak)	22 June 2018	1 July 2023	5 years, 9 days
5	CNRT	Verónica das Dores		Minister of Social Solidarity and Inclusion	IX Constitutional (Gusmão)	1 July 2023	Incumbent	3 years, 69 days
