= Wolney Queiroz =

Brazilian businessman and politician

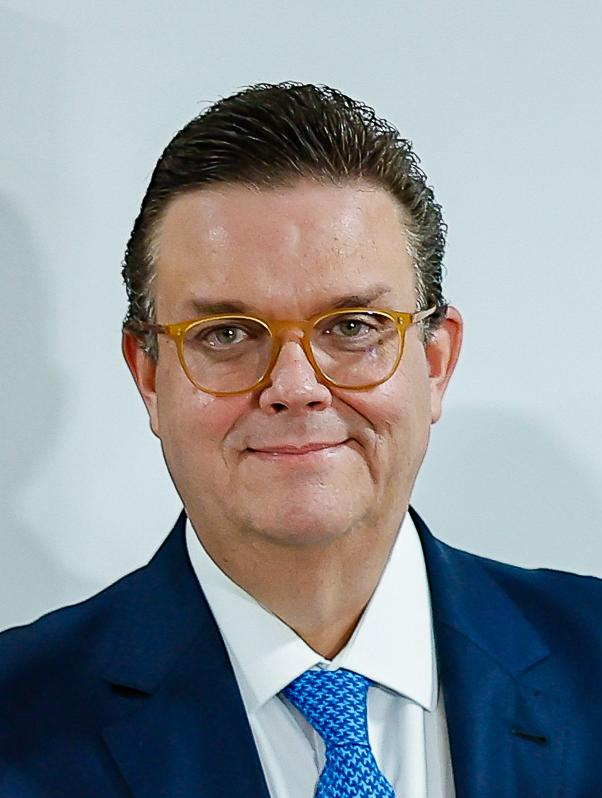

Minister of Social Security
- Incumbent
- Assumed office 2 May 2025
- President: Luiz Inácio Lula da Silva
- Preceded by: Carlos Lupi

Federal Deputy
- In office 1 February 2007 – 1 February 2023
- Constituency: Pernambuco
- In office 1 February 1995 – 1 February 1999
- Constituency: Pernambuco

Councillor of Caruaru
- In office 1 January 1993 – 1 February 1995
- Constituency: At-large

Personal details
- Born: Wolney Queiroz Maciel; 12 December 1972 (age 53) Caruaru, Pernambuco, Brazil
- Party: PDT (since 1992)
- Occupation: Politician

Wolney Queiroz Maciel (born 12 December 1972) is a Brazilian businessman and politician from the Democratic Labour Party. He has been the Opposition Leader in the Chamber of Deputies since 16 February 2022.

Political offices
Preceded by Carlos Lupi	Minister of Social Security; 2025–present	Incumbent
