= Universidade Veiga de Almeida =

Private university in Rio de Janeiro, Brazil

UVA
- Type: For-profit
- Established: 1972; 54 years ago (as Veiga de Almeida School of Engineering)
- Rector: José Luiz Duizith
- Students: c. 30,000
- Location: Rio de Janeiro and Cabo Frio, Rio de Janeiro, Brazil
- Campus: Urban
- Website: www.uva.br

Universidade Veiga de Almeida (Veiga de Almeida University, often abbreviated as UVA) is a private university with campuses located in Rio de Janeiro and Cabo Frio, Brazil.

== History ==
It was first founded in 1972 by Professor Mario Veiga de Almeida as the Escola de Engenharia Veiga de Almeida (Veiga de Almeida School of Engineering). It gained university status in 1992. The university was acquired by Rede Ilumno in 2011. Since then standards have consistently increased.

Currently, the Universidade Veiga de Almeida has four campuses, three in Rio de Janeiro, in the Barra da Tijuca, Botafogo, and Tijuca neighborhoods, and one in the Perynas neighborhood of Cabo Frio.

== Notable alumni ==
Rogéria Bolsonaro, politician
Rainer Cadete, actor
Fábio Silva, politician
Helton Yomura, politician
