= Ministry of Employment =

Ministry of Employment may refer to:

- the Ministry of Labour, Employment and Social Security (Argentina)
- Human Resources Development Canada, Canada
- Ministre d'Emploi Quebec, Canada
- the Ministry of Work, Employment, and Social Security (Bolivia)
- the Ministry of Labor and Employment (Brazil)
- the Ministry of Social Affairs and Employment (France)
- the Ministry of Labour and Employment (India)
- the Ministry of Labour and Promotion of Employment (Peru)
- the Department of Labor and Employment (Philippines)
- the Swedish Ministry of Employment (Arbetsmarknadsdepartementet)

== See also ==
- Ministry of Labor
