= Pedro Fernandes (footballer) =

Portuguese footballer (born 1985)

Personal information
- Full name: Pedro Emanuel da Silva Fernandes
- Date of birth: 17 January 1985 (age 41)
- Place of birth: Vila Real, Portugal
- Height: 1.85 m (6 ft 1 in)
- Position: Goalkeeper

Team information
- Current team: Bragança
- Number: 35

Youth career
- 1997–1998: Abambres
- 1998–1999: Porto
- 1999–2000: Diogo Cão
- 2000–2004: Braga

Senior career*
Years	Team	Apps	(Gls)
2004–2005	Dragões Sandinenses		
2005–2007	Marítimo B		
2007–2008	Salamanca		
2008–2010	Desportivo das Aves	2	(0)
2010–2011	Sertanense		
2011–2012	Macedo de Cavaleiros	16	(0)
2012–2013	Mirandela	14	(0)
2013	Pétange	9	(0)
2013–2020	Mirandela	192	(0)
2020–	Bragança	16	(0)
- * Club domestic league appearances and goals as of 16 August 2021

Pedro Emanuel da Silva Fernandes (born 17 January 1985) is a Portuguese football player who plays for GD Bragança.

== Club career ==
He made his professional debut in the Segunda Liga for Desportivo das Aves on 14 February 2010 in a game against Penafiel.
