= Verónica das Dores =

East Timorese politician

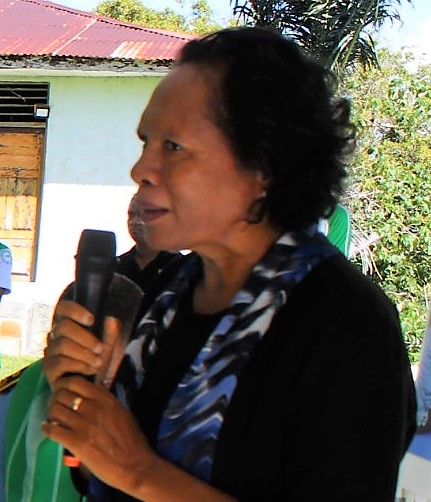
- Dores in 2022

Minister of Social Solidarity and Inclusion
- Incumbent
- Assumed office 1 July 2023
- Prime Minister: Xanana Gusmão
- Preceded by: Armanda Berta dos Santos

Personal details
- Born: Verónica das Dores
- Party: National Congress for Timorese Reconstruction (CNRT)

Verónica das Dores is an East Timorese politician, and a member of the National Congress for Timorese Reconstruction (Portuguese: Congresso Nacional de Reconstrução de Timor, CNRT).

She is the incumbent Minister of Social Solidarity and Inclusion, serving since July 2023 in the IX Constitutional Government of East Timor led by Prime Minister Xanana Gusmão.
