= Venous translucence =

Concept in phlebology

The term venous translucence (or translumination) has been used in phlebology since 1996 by surgeon Pedro Fernandes Neto during ambulatory clinical exams in Brazil. His results were published in the annals of the national and international congresses of angiology. Venous translucence is the process of reflective image visualization of veins by light, which reaches up to the superficial venous system. It is a non-invasive method. Since it is a simple, low-cost technique it can be repeated as needed, which is useful in disease-process monitoring. It is a new diagnostic procedure, still undergoing investigation; more analysis is necessary to hone its technical aspects. Venous translucence is based on optical physics. It is caused by the refraction, absorption and reflection of light (whose principle is the dispersion and absorption of light). The color which is not absorbed is reflected, and is the one that is seen. Therefore, venous translumination is based on the incidence of luminosity on the vein, where part of the light is absorbed and another reflected (supplying a silhouette of the vein in question).

== Technical aspects ==
Steps must be taken to avoid artifacts or luminous pollution during the venous translumination. Reflection and refraction of light are important to avoid distorted images which can appear during a scanning. Many are due to inappropriate sources which would provoke light loss similar to luminous pollution.

During the venous translumination, the amount of reflected light depends on the index of refraction which can be altered by the venous thrombosis. Certain types of lamps process more dispersion than reflection, and therefore favor the formation of artifacts.

Another aspect is the inability to be obtain useful images with a fiber-optic source due to the high irradiation frequency. It is also known that the reflection in an optic fiber source is initially processed internally. Certain instruments are not specific to obtain reflected images. The illumination of the skin by distant infrared light, without the impression of the source on the skin, does not reveal a diagnostic image. The translumination transductor must be in direct contact with the skin. The process should be similar to that used in Doppler ultrasonography.

== Other considerations ==
=== Tissue ===
Tissue transluminated by white light has a refraction index in agreement with its texture. By the impression of the camera on the skin, red and yellow colors are observed. The red color is soon dispersed in the skin and the yellow surrounding it begins to alter its tonality with the change in source direction. A shade with the change of source direction arises. It is known that the refraction index changes in agreement with the spectrum of transmitted light; when the white light is projected and finds an obstacle, it becomes separated into the three elementary colors (red, blue and green). Light during translumination may have greater dispersion or reflection, depending on how the source is placed on the examined area. This handling may improve or degrade the image, depending on the examiner's experience.

=== Light interaction with skin color ===
Skin is opaque to light. In physics light reception, heat or other type of radiant energy on the part of molecules is called absorption. When tissues are illuminated during translumination, some light is absorbed and some reflected. It is known that an object which absorbs all radiation is seen as black; the pigments that give color to the skin and the other tissues, absorb certain wavelengths of white light and transmit radiant energy. This is an aspect of color as captured by our vision. The mechanism by which certain substances absorb more light than others apparently depends on their molecular structure. Light, when reaching more pigmented areas, disperses and reflects more easily; the refraction index is smaller, and it is difficult for white light to penetrate below the skin. Studies of the distribution of elastin and collagen fibers in patients with dermal lesions need to be analyzed for changes. A study of tissue consistency using translumination and dermatoscopy could supply important data complementing the diagnosis of some collagen diseases and study tissue aging. Skin color affects the effectiveness of translumination; individuals with light skin have better venous visualization during the translumination than those with darker skin.

=== Blood viscosity and flow ===
The erythrocytes absorb more light because they are oxygenated. Considering that aspect, we can deduce that venous blood has a light absorption different from arterial blood (in which sanguine viscosity is greater, due to the higher concentration of CO_{2}. In that sense, venous blood has a greater ability to reflect light. When an arterial-venous fistulae is transluminated, there are few reflected images because flow velocity is higher and sanguine viscosity lower than in the venous segment. It is impossible to visualize arteries by translumination, because they do not provide a reflection due to their accelerated flow. Another aspect is that iron, which composes hemosiderin, emits light of several wavelengths when stimulated.

=== Histogram ===
In translumination, the spectrum of white light is divided into different wavelengths (colors). A histogram represents the graphic visualization of these colors and the luminescence of the obtained images. In a histogram, the intensity of the luminescence is accompanied by a gray baseline that decreases as the source approaches, where the red scale is more intense and is represented by a line in ascension. The scales of blue and green colors represent the refraction indexes of the light emitted by the transluminator in contact with the studied area. In the histogram when the selection of a scale (for example, the green scale) is disabled, the luminescence intensity of captured images may be mapped. Bollinger et al. reported their experience: denominated fluorescence video miscroscopy, based on the video capture of images and study of their luminescence through light emission stimulated by 20% sodium-fluorocein (0.3 mL/L of blood). The principles of spectrographic analysis of this test are similar to those used to evaluate the luminescence of captured images by venous translumination, and the histogram also evaluates the scales of red, blue and green (RGB). All organic components are composed of chemical elements that emit light according to their wavelength. This is why the histogram analysis of transluminated images could define an organic element according to the quality and amount of their components.

== Bibliography ==
- Aburahama, AF; Sadler, D; Robinson, PA. Axillary-subclavian vein thrombosis: changing patterns of etiology, diagnostic and thera- peutic modalities. Am Surg 1991;57:101.
- Albrechtsson, U; Olsson, C-G. Thrombotic side-effects of lower limb phlebography. Lancet 1976; I: 723.
- Ackroyd, JS; Thomas, ML; Browse, NL. Deep vein reflux: an assessment by descending phlebography. Br J Surg 1986; 73:31.
- Adams, JT; DeWeese JA et al. Intermittent subclavian vein obstruction without THROMBOSIS. SURGERY 1968;63:147.
- Bettmann, MA; Salzman, EW et al. Reduction of venous thrombosis complicating phlebography. AJR 1980; 134:1169.
- Bettmann, MA; Robbins, A et al. Contrast venography of the leg: diagnostic efficacy, tolerance, and complication rates with ionic and nonionic contrast media. Radiology 1987;165: 113.
- Bettmann, MA; Paulin, S. Leg phlebography: the incidence, nature and modification of undesirable side effects. Radiology 1977; 122:101.
- Baxter, GM; Duffy, P et al. Colour flow imaging of calf vein thrombosis. Clin Radiol 1992;46: 198.
- Barnes, RW; Nix, ML et al. Perioperative asymptomatic venous thrombosis: role of duplex scanning versus venography. J Vasc Surg 1989;9:251.
- Bollinger, A; Haselbach P, Schnewlin G, Jiinger M (1985) Microangiopathy due to Chronic Venous Incompetence Evaluated by Fluorescence Videomicroscopy. Phlebology. 255: 751- 3.
- Baldridge, ED; Martin, MA et al. Clinical significance of free-floating venous thrombi. J Vasc Surg 1990;11:62.
- Baum, RA; Holland, GH et al. Hypogastric venous thrombosis at MR angiography. Presented at the 79th Scientific Assembly and Annual Meeting of the Radiological Society of North America, Chicago, Nov 28-Dec 3, 1993.
- Bräuer, K; Hahn, M (1999) Nonlinear Analysis of Blood Flux in Human Vessels. Phys. Med. Biol. 44: 1719–33.
- Burnand, KG; Browse, NL (1982) The Cause of Venous Ulceration. Lancet. 31: 243.
- Burnand, KG; Whimester, J; Nacidoo, A; Browse NL (1982) Pericapillary Fibrin in the Ulcer Bearing Skin of the Leg: The Cause of Lipodermatosderosis and Venous Ulceration. Br. Med. J. 285: 1071–2.
- Bernstein, EF. Recent advances in noninvasive diagnostic techniques in vascular disease. St. Louis: Mosby; 1990.
- Belov, S. Classification of congenital vascular defects. Int Angiol 1990; 9: 141–146. Vascular Malformations. Edit. St. Belov DA, Loose J, Weber. Einhorn Presse Verlag. Periodica Angiologica 1989: 16; 25–27.
- Belcaro, G; Nicolaides, AN; Veller, M. in: Assessment of the venous and lymphatic systems. Authors XX, editors. Venous disorders: a manual of diagnosis and treatment. Cidade: Saundres; 1995:41.
- Cranley, JJ. Diagnostic tests for venous thrombosis. In: Cranley JJ, ed. Vascular surgery. New York: Harper and Row, 1975.
- Christopoulos, D; Nicolaides, AN. Air plethysmography. in: Raju S, Villavicencio JL., Surgical management of venous disease. Cidade: Willians & Wilkins; 1997:93.
- Chiller, KG; Passaro, D; Frieden, IJ. Hemangiomas of infancy. Clinical characteristics, morphologic subtypes, and their relationship to race, ethnicity, and sex. Arch Dermatol 2002; 138: 1567–1576.
- Cranley, JJ; Canos, AJ et al. The diagnosis of deep venous thrombosis. Arch Surg 1976; III :34.
- Coei, MN; Dodge, W. Complication rate with supine phlebography. AJR 1978; 131:821.
- Christopoulos, D; Nicolaides, AN; Szendro, G; Irvine, AT; Bull, ML; Eastcott, HHG. Air plethysmography and the effect of elastic compression on the venous haemodynamics of the leg. J Vasc Surg 1987;5:148-159.
- Cherian, SM; Bobryshev, YV; Inder, SJ; Lord, RS; Ashwell, KW (1999) Dendritic Cells in Venous Pathologies. 50: 393-402
- Cronan, JJ; Dorfman, GS et al. Deep vein thrombosis: US assessment using vein compression. Radiology 1987;162:191.
- Cohan, RH; Leder, RA et al. Extravascular extravasation of radiographic contrast media: effects of conventional and low-osmolar agents in the rat thigh. Invest RadioI 1990; 25:504.
- Christopoulos, D; Nicolaides, AN; Szendro, G. Venous reflux: quantification and correlation with the clinical severity of chronic venous disease. Br J Surg 1988;75:352-356.
- Campbell, CB; Chandler, JG et al. Axillary, subclavian and brachiocephalic vein obstruction. Surgery 1977; 82:816.
- Comerota, AJ; Katz, ML et al. Venous duplex imaging: should it replace hemodynamic tests for deep vein thrombosis? J Vasc Surg 1990; 11:53.
- Cronan, JJ. Ultrasound evaluation of deep vein thrombosis. Semin Roentgenol 1992;27:39.
- Cronan, JJ. Venous thromboembolic disease: the role of US. Radi- ology 1993;186:619.
- Darke, SG. The morphology of recurrent varicose veins. Eur J Vasc Surg 1992;6:512-517.
- Dorfman, GS; Froehlich, JA et al. Lower-extremity venous thrombosis in patients with acute hip fractures: determination of anatomic location and time of onset with compression sonography. AJR 1990; 154:851.
- Dorfman, GS; Cronan, JJ. Venous ultrasonography. Radiol Clin North Am 1992;30:879.
- Dimmeler, S; Assmus, B; Hermann, C; Haendeler, J; Zeiher. AM (1998) Fluid Shear Stress Stimulates Phosphorylation of Akt in Human Endothelial Cells: Involvement in Suppression of Apoptosis. Circ. Res. 83: 334–41.
- Davidson, BL; Elliott, CG et al. Low accuracy of color Doppler ultrasound in the detection of proximal leg vein thrombosis in asymptomatic high-risk patients. Ann Intern Med 1992; II 7:735.
- Deweese, JA; Rogoff SM. Phlebographic pattems of acute deep venous thrombosis of the leg. Surgery 1963;53:99. MOSER KM, Brach BB, et al. Clinically suspected deep venous thrombosis of the lower extremities. JAMA 1977; 237: 2195.
- Darke, SG; Vetrivel, S; Foy, DMA; Smith, S; Baker, S. The comparison of duplex scanning and continuous wave Doppler in the assessment of primary and uncomplicated varicose veins. Eur J Vasc Endovasc Surg 1997; 14:457-461.
- Elam, EA; Dorr, RT et al. Cutaneous ulceration due to contrast extravasation; experimental assessment of injury and potential an - tidotes. Invest Radiol 1991; 26:13.
- Franzeck, UK; Bollinger, A; Huch, R; Huch, A (1984) Transcutaneous Oxygen Tension and Capillary Morphologic Characteristics and Density in Patients with Chronic Venous Incompetence. Circulation. 5: 806–11.
- Fonseca, FP; Evangelista, SSM; Sarquis, AL. Surgery for primary troncular varicose veins without stripping the saphenous vein: pre- and post-operative evaluationby duplex scan and photoplethysmography. Phlebology (1995) Suppl.1:419-421
- Gaskell, P; Burton, AC (1953) Local Postural Vasomotor Reflexes Arising from the Limb Veins. Circ. Res. 1: 27–39.
- Godart, S. Studies of the physiology lymphatic vessel by microcirculation methods-1968.
- George, JE; Berry, RE. Noninvasive detection of deep venous thrombosis: a critical evaluation. Am Surg 1990;56:76.
- Hanspoul, S; Makkar, M.D. Transillumination of a Cystic Lymphatic Malformation University of California, San Francisco, CA 94143
- Hammarsten, J; Pederson, P; Cerdelund, CG; Campanello, M. Long saphenous vein saving surgery for varicose veins: a long-term follow-up. Eur J Vasc Surg 1990;4:361-64.
- Hoare, M.C; Royle, JP. Doppler ultrasound and detection of saphenofemoral and saphenopopliteal incompetence and operative venography to ensure precise saphenopopliteal ligation. Aust N Z J Surg 1984;54:49-52.
- Hughes, ESR. Venous obstruction in upper extremity (Paget- Schroetter's syndrome). Surg Gynecol Obstet 1949;88:89.
- Haimovici, H; Suffness, G. Gangrene of the extremities of venous origin: case report. Am J Med Sci 1948; 215:278.
- Haimovici, H. Gangrene of the extremities of venous origin: review of literature with case reports. Circulation 1950; I : 225.
- Haimovici, H. Ischemic forms of venous thrombosis: phlegmasia cerulea dolens, venous gangrene. Springfield, IlI: Charles C Tho- mas,1971.
- Jugenheimer, M; Junginger, T. Endoscopic subfascial sectioning of incompetent perforating veins in treatment of primary varicosis. World J Surg 1992; 16:971-5.
- Jones, L; Braithwaite, BD; Selwyn, D; Cooke, S; Earnshaw, JJ. Neovascularisation is the principal cause of varicose vein recurrence: results of a randomised trial of stripping the long saphenous vein. Eur J Vasc Endovasc Surg 1996;12:442-445.
- Kohout, MP; Hansen, M; Pribaz, JJ; Mulliken, JB. Arteriovenous malformation of the head and neck: natural history and management. Plast Reconstr Surg 1988; 102: 643–654.
- Killewich, LA; Bedford, GR et al. Diagnosis of deep venous thrombosis: a prospective study comparing duplex scanning to contrast venography. Circulation 1989; 79:810.
- Koyano, K; Sakaguchi, S. Selective stripping operation based on doppler findings for primary varicose veins of the lower extremities. Surgery 1988;103 (6): 615 - 619.
- Katayama, H; Yamaguchi, K et al. Adverse reaction to ionic and nonionic contrast media. Report from the Japanese Committee on the Safety of Contrast Media. Radiology 1990;175:621.
- Luke, JC. Diagnosis of chronic enlargement of the leg, with description of new syndrome. Surg Gynecol Obstet 1941; 73:472.
- Lautin, EM; Freeman, NJ et al. Radiocontrast-associated renal dysfunction: incidence and risk factors. AJR 1991; 157:49.
- Laerum, F; Holm, HA. Postphlebographic thrombosis. Radiology 1981; 140:651.
- Lensing, A W; Prandoni, P et al. Detection of deep-vein thrombosis by real-time B-mode ultrasonography. N Engl J Med 1989; 320:342.
- May, R, Thumer J. The cause of predominantly sinistral occurrence of thrombosis of the pelvic veins. Angiology 1957; 8:419.
- Merritt, CR. Evaluation of peripheral venous disease. Clin Diagn Ultrasound 1992;27:113.
- Minar, E; Ehringer, H et al. Prevention of postvenographic thrombosis by heparin flush: fibrinogen uptake measurement. AJR 1984;143:629.
- Munn, SR; Morton, JB; Macbeth, WAAG; Mcleish, AR. To strip or not to strip the long saphenous vein: a varicose veins trial. Br J Surg 1981;68:426-8.
- Nicolaides, AN; Zukowski, A; Lewis, P; Kyprianou, P; Malouf, M. The value of ambulatory venous pressure measurements. In: Bergan JJ, Yao JST, editors. Surgery of the veins. Orlando: Grune & Stratton; 1985:111-119.
- Nicolaides, AN, Investigation of Chronic Venous Insufficiency - A Consensus Statement (Circulation. 2000; 102:e 126.) 2000 American Heart Association, Inc.
- Nielsson, GE; Tenland, T; Oberg, PA(1980)Evaluation of a Doppler laser flowmeter for measurement of tissue blood flow. Molecular Basis for microcirculatory disorders-G.W Schmid-Schonbein, Granger.
- Needleman, L. Peripheral venous US. In: Rifkin M, ed. Special course: ultrasound 1991. Oak Brood, 1lI: RSNA Publications, 1991.
- Nyamekere, I; Shepard, NA Clinicopathological evidence that neovascularisation is a cause of recurrent varicose veins. Eur J Vasc Endovasc Surg 1998; 15:412-415.
- Paefrey, PS; Griffiths, SM et al. Contrast material-induced renal failure in patients with diabetes mellitus, renal insufficiency, or both. N Engl J Med 1989;320:143.
- Palmer, FG. The RACR survey of intravenous contrast media reactions: final report. Australas Radiol 1988;32:426.
- Puig, S; Aref, H; Chigot, V; Bonin, B; Brunelle, F. Classification of venous malformations in children and implications for sclerotherapy. Pediatr Radiol 2003; 33: 99–103.
- Perlin, SJ. Pulmonary embolism during compression US of the lowerextremity. Radiology 1992; 184:165.
- Polak, JF; Cutler, SS et al. Deep veins of the calf: assessment with color Doppler flow imaging. Radiology 1989; 171:481.
- Polak, JF. Venous thrombosis. In: Peripheral vascular sonography: a practical guide. Baltimore: Williams and Wilkins, 1992.
- Polak, JF. Chronic venous thrombosis and venous insufficiency. In: Peripheral vascular sonography: a practical guide. Baltimore: Williams and Wilkins, 1992.
- Rose, SC; Zwiebel, WJ et al. Symptomatic lower extremity deep venous thrombosis: accuracy, limitations, and role of color du- plex flow imaging in diagnosis. Radiology 1990;175:639.
- Rosfors, S. Venous photoplethysmography: Relationship between transducer position and regional distribution of venous insufficiency. J Vasc Surg 1990;11:436-40.
- Rytherfor, RB; Lowenstein, DH; Klein, MF. Combining segmental systolic pressure and plethysmography to diagnose arterial occlusive disease of the legs. Am J Surg 1979;138:211-17.
- Rabinov, K; Paulin, S. Roentgen diagnosis of venous thrombosis in the leg. Arch Surg 1972; 104:134.
- Shohat, M; Alpert, G Translumination of the abdomen in neonatal necrotizing enterocolitis NCBI Pub Med Harefuah. 1983 Aug;105(3-4):65-7.
- Sarin, S; Shields, DA; Scurr, JH; Coleridge Smith, PD. Photoplethysmography: A valuable noninvasive tool in the assessment of venous dysfunction? J Vasc Surg 1992;16:154-62.
- Sheppard, M. A procedure for the prevention of recurrent saphenofemoral incompetence. Aust N Z, J Surg 1978; 48:322-326.
- Swinton, NW; Edget, JW et al. Primary subclavian-axillary vein thrombosis. CircuÍation 1968;38:737 .
- Topper, David. Newton on the number of colours in the spectrum. Studies in History and Philosophy of Science 21: 269–79, 1990.
- Taliercio, CP; Vliestra, RE et al. Risk for renal dysfunction with cardiac angiography. Ann Intern Med 1986; 104:501.
- Thomas, ML. Phlebography. Arch Surg 1972; 104:145.
- Thomas, ML; O'Dwyer, JA. A phlebographic study of the incidence and significance of venous thrombosis in the foot. AJR 1978;130:751.
- Thomas, ML; McAllister, V. The radiological progression of deep venous thrombus. Radiology 1971;99:37.
- Talbot, SR. Use of real-time imaging in identifying deep venous obstruction: a preliminary report. Bruit, 1982; 6:41-46.
- Van Bemrnelen, PS; Bedford, G et al. Visualization of calf veins by color flow imaging. Ultrasound Med Biol 1990; 16:15.
- Vaccaro, JP; Cronan JJ, et al. Outcome analysis of patients with norrnal compression US examinations. Radiology 1990; 175: 645.
- Wali, MA, Sheehan, SJ; Colgan, MP; Moore, DJ; Shanik, GD. Recurrent varicose veins. East Afr Méd 1998;75:188-91.
- Warren, R. Behavior of venous thrombi. Arch Surg 1980;115:1151. 13. Mayor EE, Galloway JMD, et al. Venography in iliofemoral venous thromboembolism. Surg Gynecol Obstet 1969;129:57.
- Wolf, GL; Arenson, RL; Cross, AP. A prospective trial of ionic vs nonionic contrast agents in routine clinical practice: comparison of adverse effects. AJR 1989; 152:930.
- White, RH; McGahan, JP et al. Diagnosis of deep-vein thrombosis using duplex ultrasound. Ann Intern Med 1989; III :297.
- Whittaker, Edmund. A History of the Theories of Aether and Electricity. 2 vols. New York: American Institute of Physics, 1987.
- Waner, M; Suen, JY (eds) Hemangiomas and vascular malformations of the head and week. New York: Wiley-Liss, 1999.
- Yang, D; Vavdongen, YK; Stacey, MC. Variability and reliability of air plethysmographic measurements for the evaluation of chronic venous disease. J Vasc Surg 1997;26:638-642.
- Zwiebel, WJ; Priest, DL. Color duplex sonography of extremity veins. Semin Ultrasound CT MR 1990;11:136.
