= Pedro Lopes (Cape Verdean politician) =

Cape Verdean Politician and Civic Leader

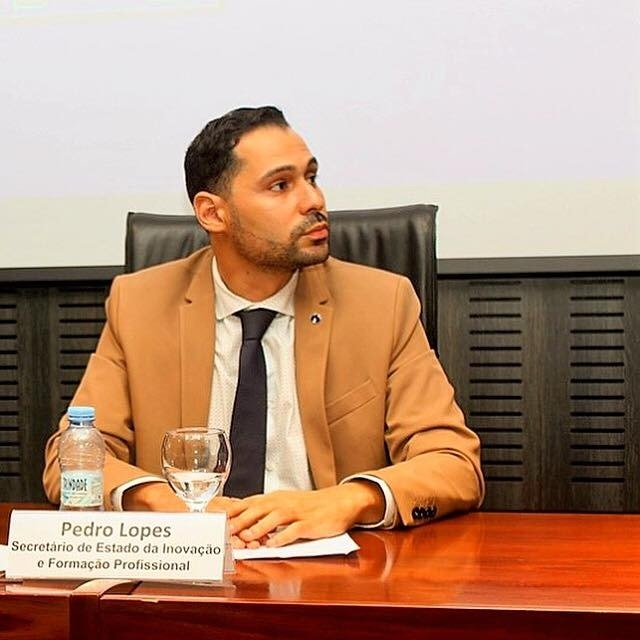

Secretary of State for Digital Economy of Cape Verde
- Incumbent
- Assumed office April 2021
- President: José Maria Neves
- Prime Minister: Ulisses Correia e Silva

Secretary of State for Innovation & Technical Training of Cape Verde
- In office 5 January 2018 – April 2021
- President: Jorge Carlos Fonseca
- Prime Minister: Ulisses Correia e Silva

Personal details
- Born: Pedro Nuno Alves Fernandes Lopes; 22 January 1986 (age 40) Coimbra, Portugal
- Education: University of Coimbra; University of Bradford
- Profession: Specialist in Strategic Communication, Innovation and International Relations

Pedro Nuno Alves Fernandes Lopes (Coimbra, 22 January 1986), is the current Secretary of State for Digital Economy of the Government of the Republic of Cape Verde. He previously served as the Secretary of State for Innovation and Vocational Training of the Government of the Republic of Cape Verde from 2018 to 2021.

== Early life and education ==
Son of José António Lopes (Praia – Achada de Santo António, Cape Verde, 7 September 1961) and Maria Isabel Alves (Coimbra, 18 January 1948). Family from Coimbra, Portugal and from Praia (Achada de Santo António) and Ilha do Fogo (Mosteiros), Cape Verde.

Pedro Lopes has a degree in International Relations from the University of Coimbra in Portugal, a Master's degree in Conflict Resolution from the University of Bradford in the United Kingdom, and a Post Graduate in Strategic Marketing Communication from the Department of Economics of the University of Coimbra. He was President of the International Relations Students' Union of the University of Coimbra (NERIFE).

== Profissional career ==
In Portugal, he completed his professional internship at the Cape Verde Embassy in Lisbon and held the position of Customer Manager and International Business Manager in the areas of construction, commerce and hotel design at the Catarino Group companies – for the markets of Portugal, Spain and Cape Verde.

In Italy, Pedro Lopes worked with the Trieste City Hall, where he organized workshops, conferences and promoted youth mobility within the framework of a European Commission project.

In Cape Verde, Pedro was part of the team that organized the successful "Africa Innovation Summit – AIS" as Director of the African Innovation Exhibit and as Deputy Director of the African Innovation Summit. He was also a communications consultant, project manager and Executive Vice President of Wansati Communications and served as Communications Associate at the United Nations – in the city of Praia. At the age of 31, he became the youngest Member of the current Government of Cape Verde when he was appointed Secretary of State for Innovation and Vocational Training.

== Active presence in Civil Society ==
Pedro Lopes is the founder and President of Generation B-Bright a nonprofit youth empowerment project that creates awareness for the engagement of Cape Verdean youth for civic participation and for the importance of strengthening skills. In 2016 the B-Bright Generation was nominated for the "We Are Cape Verde – The Best of the Year" Awards in the Innovation and Entrepreneurship category. Pedro is also the holder of the license and organizer of Cape Verde's first TEDx, is the world's largest platform for sharing ideas. In 2017, through TEDxPraia was again named, but this time, also the winner of the "We are Cape Verde – The Best of the Year" Prizes in the category of Innovation and Entrepreneurship.

== Young African Leader ==
Pedro Lopes participated in the Mandela Washington Fellowship Program for Young African Leaders, this is the largest program for young African leaders in the World, promoted by the Government of the United States. This The program enabled Pedro Lopes to undertake intensive training in Business and Entrepreneurship at the University of New Mexico – USA, to develop a network with young people who are leaders in their countries in the civil society, the business world and occupy prominent positions in their Governments. Among the young African leaders who participated in the Mandela Washington Fellowship, Pedro Lopes had the privilege of belonging to restricted group selected for a professional experience and was at the International Youth Foundation in Baltimore, USA that Pedro collaborated with an organization with more than 25 years of experience in the field of vocational training and promotion of youth employability and which is present in more than 70 countries.

Pedro Lopes served as an elected member of the Regional Advisory Board for Young African Leaders of West Africa, an organization serving as the liaison between the International Research & Exchanges Board (IREX), and the United States Agency for International Development (USAID) and young African leaders, promoting dialogue, sharing best practices in various areas and promoting opportunities for the United States Government's International Development Agency for young African leaders. In 2018, Pedro Lopes was chosen by former US President Barack Obama to be part of his first African Continent leadership initiative – Obama Foundation Leaders: Africa.

== Presence in the Media ==
Interviews for various media outlets (Cape Verde, Portugal, Italy, United States, Angola, Mozambique), Lopes was one of the first Cape Verdeans to be interviewed by the Forbes Magazine, where he spoke about the country's potential in the area of ICT, Diaspora and the creation of Cape Verde 2.0.

== Awards and nominations ==
- Winner with the TEDxPraia project of the "We are Cape Verde – The Best of the Year" award in the category of Innovation and Entrepreneurship.
- Selected as one of the 100 most influential Afro-descendants in the world under 40 by the MIPAD of New York in the framework of the United Nations proclaimed African Decade of African Descent.
- Named for the "Politicians of the Year" Award by the prestigious "One Young World" organization based in London, England.
- Shortlisted in Personality of the Year by – P3 / Público
- Selected as one of the 100 Most Influential Young African People by the Africa Youth Awards based in Ghana.
