= Eliseu Padilha =

Brazilian lawyer and politician (1945–2023)

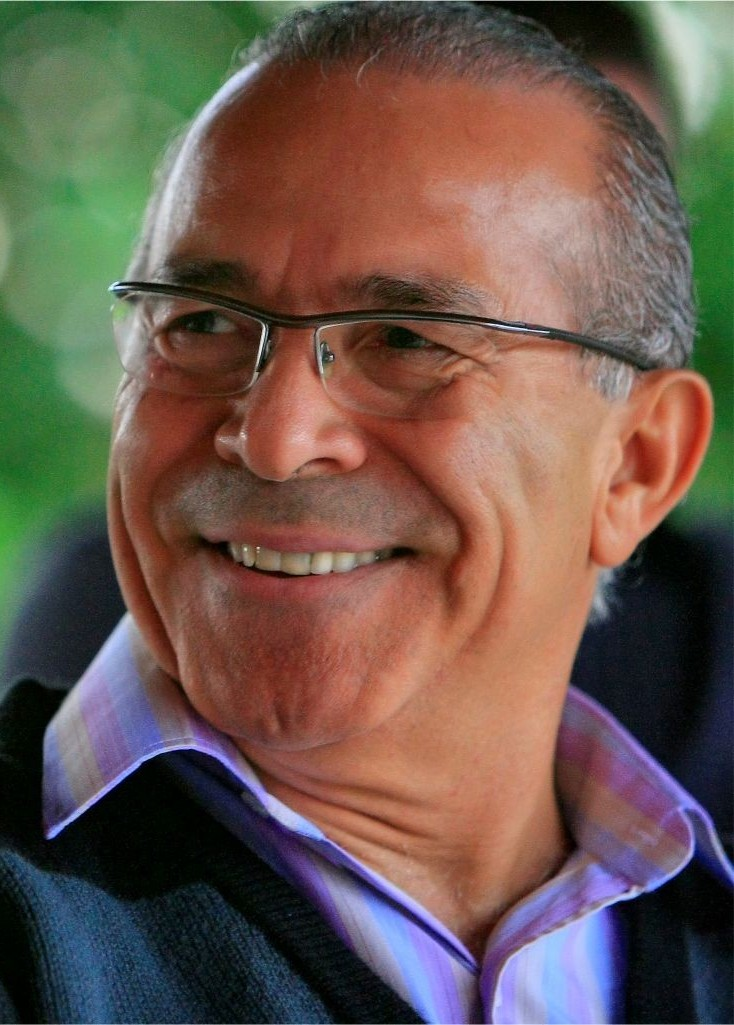

Chief of Staff of the Presidency
- In office 12 May 2016 – 1 January 2019
- President: Michel Temer
- Preceded by: Eva Chiavon (acting)
- Succeeded by: Onyx Lorenzoni

Minister of Labor (Acting)
- In office 5 July 2018 – 10 July 2018
- President: Michel Temer
- Preceded by: Helton Yomura
- Succeeded by: Caio Vieira de Mello

Minister of Civil Aviation
- In office 1 January 2015 – 1 December 2015
- President: Dilma Rousseff
- Preceded by: Moreira Franco
- Succeeded by: Mauro Lopes

Federal Deputy
- In office 23 August 2011 – 1 January 2015
- Constituency: Rio Grande do Sul
- In office 1 February 2003 – 1 February 2011
- Constituency: Rio Grande do Sul
- In office 1 February 1995 – 1 February 1999
- Constituency: Rio Grande do Sul

Minister of Transport
- In office 22 May 1997 – 16 November 2001
- President: Fernando Henrique Cardoso
- Preceded by: Alcides Saldanha
- Succeeded by: Alderico Lima

Mayor of Tramandaí
- In office 1 January 1989 – 1 January 1993
- Preceded by: Elói Brás Sessim
- Succeeded by: Edegar Rapaki

Personal details
- Born: Eliseu Lemos Padilha; 23 December 1945 Canela, Rio Grande do Sul, Brazil
- Died: 13 March 2023 (aged 77) Porto Alegre, Rio Grande do Sul, Brazil
- Party: MDB (1966–2023)
- Education: University of Rio dos Sinos Valley
- Website: Official website

Eliseu Lemos Padilha (23 December 1945 – 13 March 2023) was a Brazilian lawyer and politician, who was appointed by then-President Dilma Rousseff as the minister of the Brazilian Civil Aeronautics Government Department. He was in office from 1 January 2015 to 1 December 2015. He also served as minister of Transport and Infrastructure between 1997 and 2001 (appointed by then-President Fernando Henrique Cardoso) and for four terms as federal congressman of the state of Rio Grande do Sul, his birthplace.

Padilha was one of the few ministers to have resigned from a ministerial office because of a divergent position from their government's policies.

Padilha died on 13 March 2023, at age 77.

Political offices
Preceded by Elói Brás Sessim	Mayor of Tramandaí; 1989–1993	Succeeded by Edegar Rapaki
Preceded by Alcides Saldanha	Minister of Transport; 1997–2001	Succeeded by Alderico Lima
Preceded by Moreira Franco	Minister of Civil Aviation; 2015	Succeeded by Mauro Lopes
Vacant Title last held by Luiz Inácio Lula da Silva	Chief of Staff of the Presidency; 2016–2019	Succeeded by Onyx Lorenzoni
Preceded by Helton Yomura	Minister of Labor (Acting); 2018	Succeeded by Caio Vieira de Mello
