= Helton Yomura =

Brazilian lawyer and government minister (born 1984)

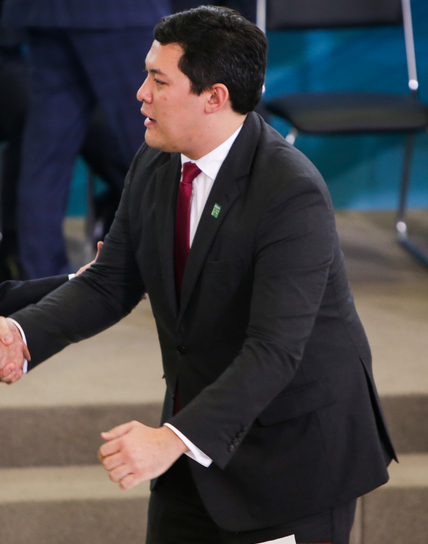

Minister of Labor and Employment
- In office 10 April 2018 – 5 July 2018
- Preceded by: Ronaldo Nogueira (2017)
- Succeeded by: Eliseu Padilha (interim)

Personal details
- Born: 17 November 1984 (age 40) Rio de Janeiro, Brazil
- Political party: PTB

Helton Yomura (born 17 November 1984) is a Brazilian lawyer who was briefly the Minister of Labor and Employment from April to June 2018. During his time as minister, he was a member of the Brazilian Labour Party (PTB).

== Biography ==
Yomura was born on 17 November 1984 in Rio de Janeiro. He is of Japanese background. He graduated with a law degree from Universidade Veiga de Almeida and completed a post-graduate degree in Public Administration Law from Fluminense Federal University. He was the Regional Superintendent of the Rio de Janeiro State Ministry of Labour from 2016 to 2017. In October 2017, he took office as the executive secretary of the Ministry of Labour after the failed nomination of Cristiane Brasil. He later became the interim minister, officially taking office on 10 April 2018.

== Operação Registro Espúrio ==
On 5 July 2018, a justice of the Supreme Federal Court, Edson Fachin, authorized the removal from office of Yomura during the new phase of Operação Registro Espúrio, initiated by Brazilian Federal Police. The same day, the Diário Oficial da União officialized his dismissal from the post.
