= Roberto Jefferson =

Brazilian politician (born 1953)

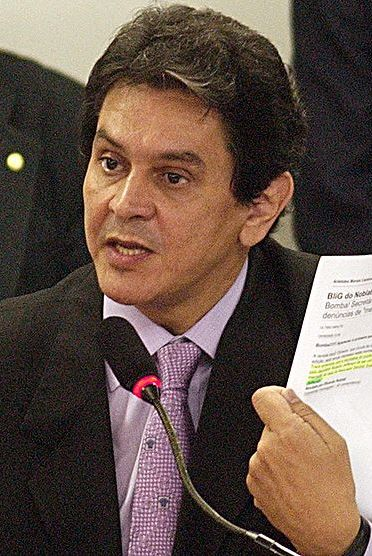

National President of PTB
- In office 14 April 2016 – 10 November 2021
- Preceded by: Cristiane Brasil
- Succeeded by: Kassyo Santos Ramos (acting)

Member of the Chamber of Deputies
- In office 1 February 1983 – 15 September 2005
- Constituency: Rio de Janeiro

Personal details
- Born: Roberto Jefferson Monteiro Francisco; 14 June 1953 (age 73) Petrópolis, Rio de Janeiro, Brazil
- Party: Independent (2023–present)
- Other political affiliations: MDB (1971–1979); PDS (1979–1980); PTB (1982–2023)
- Spouse: Ana Lúcia Novaes (m. 2015)
- Children: Cristiane Brasil; Fabiana Brasil; Roberto Francisco Neto
- Parents: Roberto Francisco (father); Neusa Dalva Monteiro (mother)
- Education: Estácio de Sá University (LL.B.)
- Awards: Order of Military Merit (Commander - Comendador)

Roberto Jefferson Monteiro Francisco (Note: Portuguese pronunciation: [ʁoˈbɛʁ.tu ˈʒɛ.feʁ.sõ mõˈte(j).ɾu fɾɐ̃ˈsis.ku]) (born 14 June 1953) is a Brazilian politician.

== Personal life and education ==
He was born on 14 June 1953, in Petrópolis, in the state of Rio de Janeiro. He is the son of Neusa Dalva Monteiro Francisco and Roberto Francisco. Roberto Jefferson is married to Ana Lúcia Novaes.

He finished his high school studies at Werneck School in Petrópolis and received a law degree in 1979 from the Estácio de Sá University in Rio de Janeiro.

== Various parties ==
His political career began officially in 1971 when he joined the MDB (known as PMDB since 1979) party. Jefferson remained in MDB until 1979, when he went to the Progressive Party (PP). He left the PP in 1980 and he joined the Brazilian Labour Party (PTB), which his grandfather helped to form in 1945.

== Career with the PTB ==
Jefferson and his party were one of the key supporters of the right-wing Fernando Collor de Mello government, and a key defender in Congress during the influence peddling scandal which led to Collor's impeachment.

In 1993, he was cited in a congressional report which investigated bribery in the congressional budgeting committee as an individual who should be "investigated further". Ultimately his financial assets were deemed compatible with his declared income, though undeclared assets were found.

In 1999, he became the leader of the PTB party in the Brazilian Chamber of Deputies. He continued as their leader until 2002. In February 2003, PTB elected him as its National President.

== Corruption scandal and other controversies ==
In 2005, Jefferson became involved in a corruption scandal related to the Correios, the Brazilian postal administration. Facing a congressional inquiry related to his actions, Jefferson retaliated by exposing a cash-for-votes scheme, where he claimed congressmen were paid monthly sums in exchange for votes supporting president Luiz Inácio Lula da Silva, in what became known as the Mensalão scandal. The scandal included dozens of parliamentarians of the government's coalition and two government ministers, among others, resulting in the indictment of forty people by the Supreme Federal Tribunal, for their alleged role in one of the country's biggest corruption scandals in recent years.

He was expelled from Congress on 14 September 2005, stemming from his actions in the Correios scandal. The expulsion barred him from being elected to any public office until 2015. In 2016 he was elected as leader of the PTB.

In March 2021, Jefferson posted a post on Instagram accusing Jews of sacrificing children, which drew massive criticism from Jewish organisations and led to the removal of the post. The Brazilian Israelite Confederation confirmed it was preparing to file charges against Jefferson.

On 13 August 2021, Jefferson was arrested on allegations of attacking democracy. Since 24 January 2022 Roberto Jefferson is under house arrest. On 23 October, Jefferson threw grenades and exchanged gunfire against agents of the Federal Police of Brazil coming to take him to prison after his house arrest was revoked after he insulted and threatened Supreme Federal Court minister Cármen Lúcia. Two officers were wounded in the incident.

== Notes ==
Party political offices
Preceded by Cristiane Brasil	National President of Brazilian Labor Party; 2016–2021	Succeeded by Kassyo Santos Ramos (acting)
