= Ronaldo Nogueira =

Brazilian politician and pastor (born 1966)

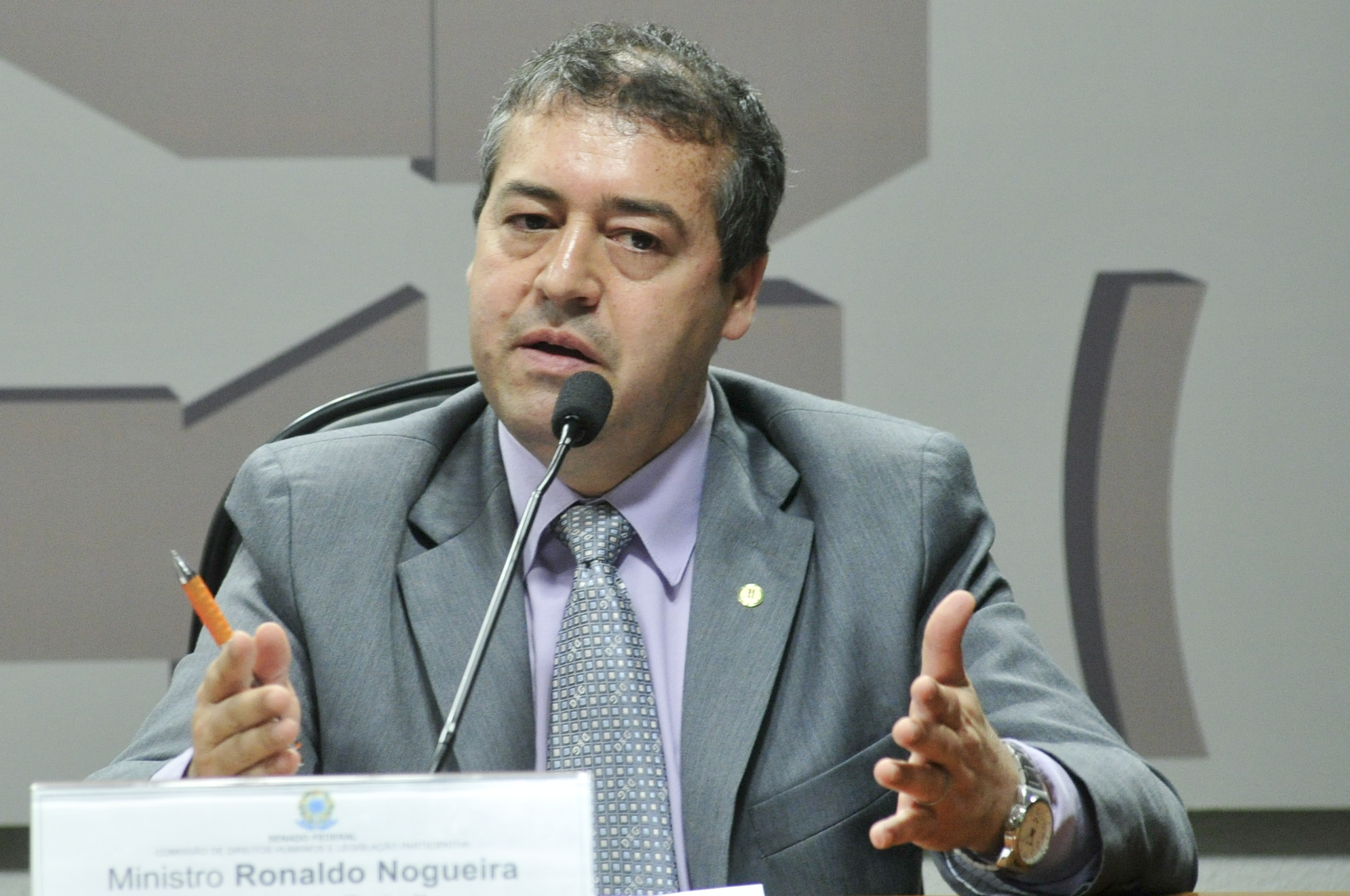

State Secretary of Labour and Social Services of Rio Grande do Sul
- Incumbent
- Assumed office 30 March 2021
- Governor: Eduardo Leite
- Preceded by: Regina Becker Fortunati

Federal Deputy from Rio Grande do Sul
- In office 1 February 2015 – 1 February 2019

Minister of Labour and Employment
- In office 12 May 2016 – 27 December 2017
- President: Michel Temer
- Preceded by: Miguel Rossetto
- Succeeded by: Helton Yomura

City Councillor of Carazinho
- In office 1 January 1993 – 1 January 2009

Personal details
- Born: Ronaldo Nogueira de Oliveira; 25 April 1966 (age 60) Carazinho, RS, Brazil
- Party: Republicanos (2021–present)
- Other political affiliations: PTB (until 2021)
- Education: Federal University of Rio Grande do Sul (UFRGS); Lutheran University of Brazil (ULBRA)
- Occupation: Administrator, politician, evangelical pastor

Ronaldo Nogueira de Oliveira (born 25 April 1966 in Carazinho) is a Brazilian administrator, pastor of Assembly of God Church and politician, affiliated with the Brazilian Labor Party. Currently, he is discharged federal deputy and minister of Labour and Social Security of Brazil since 12 May 2016, appointed by president Michel Temer.

== Slave Labor ==
In October 2017, a resolution presented by Ronaldo Nogueira and adopted by the government, altered the terms by which people who are exploited under conditions analogous to slavery could benefit from legal proceedings.

One of the measures outlined in the decree redefines slavery as being confined to "restrictions on the freedom of movement" of workers. However, experts note that such a reformulation pushes the country back to May 13, 1888, when the legalities of slavery were abolished in Brazil.

== Political career ==
Nogueira voted in favor of the impeachment against then-president Dilma Rousseff. Nogueira voted in favor of the Brazil labor reform (2017), and would later back Rousseff's successor Michel Temer against a similar corruption investigation and impeachment motion.

Political offices
Preceded by Miguel Rossetto	Minister of Labour and Employment; 2016–2017	Succeeded by Helton Yomura
Preceded by Regina Becker Fortunati	State Secretary of Labour and Social Services of Rio Grande do Sul; 2021–present	Incumbent
