= Reinhold Stephanes =

Brazilian politician (born 1939)

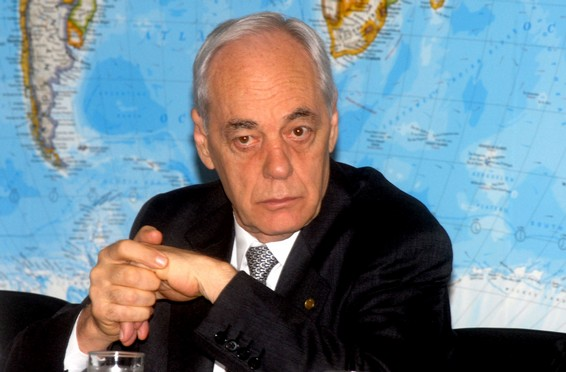

Secretary of Public Management of Paraná
- Incumbent
- Assumed office 1 January 2019
- Governor: Ratinho Júnior

Minister of Agriculture, Livestock and Supply of Brazil
- In office 22 March 2007 – 31 March 2010

Personal details
- Born: August 13, 1939 (age 87) Porto União, Santa Catarina (state), Brazil
- Party: National Renewal Alliance (1977-1979) Democratic Social Party (1980-1985) Democrats (1985-2000) Brazilian Democratic Movement (2000-2011) Social Democratic Party (2011-presente)

Reinhold Stephanes (born August 13, 1939, Porto União) is a Brazilian economist and politician affiliated with the Social Democratic Party, who is currently serving as the Secretary of Public Management of Paraná. He was Minister of Agriculture, Labor and Social Security during the Collor, Fernando Henrique Cardoso and Lula administrations.

== Personal life ==
A descendant of Germans, Reinhold Stephanes is the son of Oswald Stephanes and Lili Schumann Poll Stephanes, farmers from Paraná. His parents migrated from Rio Negro to Santa Catarina, and Reinhold was born in the Porto União region. He speaks Portuguese and German. He was raised in União da Vitória, and at the age of ten he moved to Rio Negro. At the age of twelve, he settled in Curitiba, going to live at the boarding school of the Curitiba Technical School.

At eighteen, he joined the army, staying there for five years, first as a soldier, then as a corporal. In 1963 he graduated in economics from the Federal University of Paraná and specialized in economic development from ECLAC/UN in the same year. In 1966 he finished a specialization in public administration in Germany.

He is the father of Reinhold Stephanes Junior, an economist, former state deputy, and currently a substitute federal deputy for the Social Democratic Party.

== Public life ==
In 1963, he was technical assistant in administration to the Central Budget Directory of the Paraná state government. He was economic advisor to the Curitiba City Hall's Treasury Department in 1964. In 1965 he was supervisor of Economic and Social Planning at the Curitiba mayor's office.

In 1966, he was appointed Curitiba's Municipal Secretary of Finance, a position he held until 1967 under Mayor Ivo Arzua Pereira. Still in Curitiba's City Hall, he was General Inspector of Finances from 1967 to 1970.

In Curitiba he also worked as a university professor, teaching at the Pontifical Catholic University of Paraná from 1966 to 1967. On March 22, 2007, he was appointed Minister of Agriculture, Livestock and Supply in the second Lula Administration. On March 31, 2010, he left the Ministry to run again for Federal Deputy, having been reelected with 95,147 votes.

=== House of Representatives ===
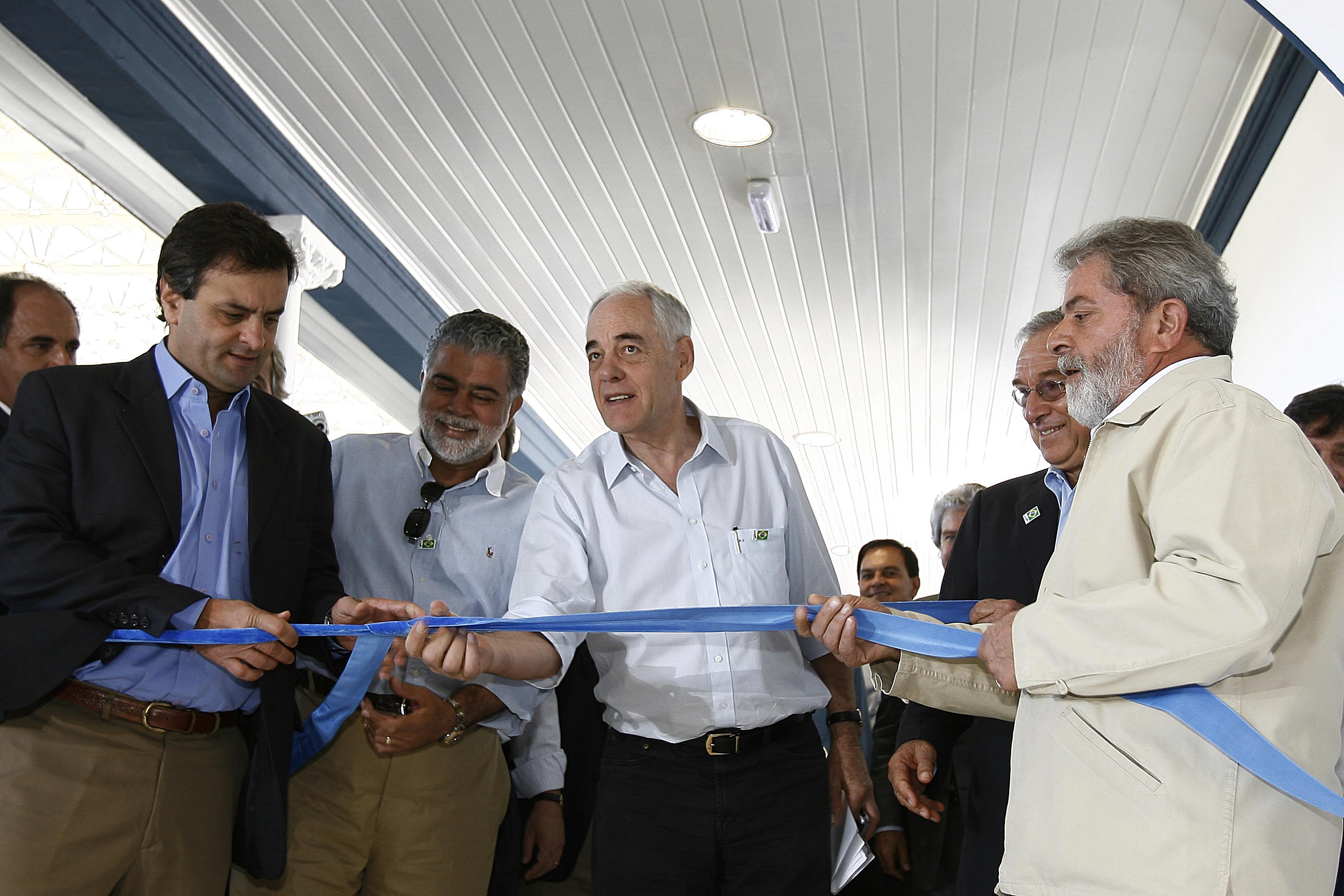
Stephanes next to Anderson Adauto, mayor of Uberaba, Aécio Neves and Lula, at the opening of the 73rd ExpoZebu, in Uberaba.

He was a federal deputy in the periods 1979–1983, for the dissolved National Renewal Alliance, 1983–1987, for Democratic Social Party, 1991–1995, for Democrats; 1995–1999, also for Democrats; 2005–2006, for the Brazilian Democratic Movement, and was reelected for the 2007-2011 legislature, also for Brazilian Democratic Movement. In 2016, he was denounced for his participation in the airline ticket scandal, which occurred when he was a federal deputy in 2009. He allegedly continued to use the airfare quota to which he was entitled as a deputy, after being appointed minister, despite Act 42 of the Bureau of the House of Representatives, from 2000, stating that deputies cannot use the quota while their alternates are in office.
