= Ministry of Labour and Employment (Brazil) =

Government ministry of Brazil

- Portuguese: Ministério do Trabalho e Emprego
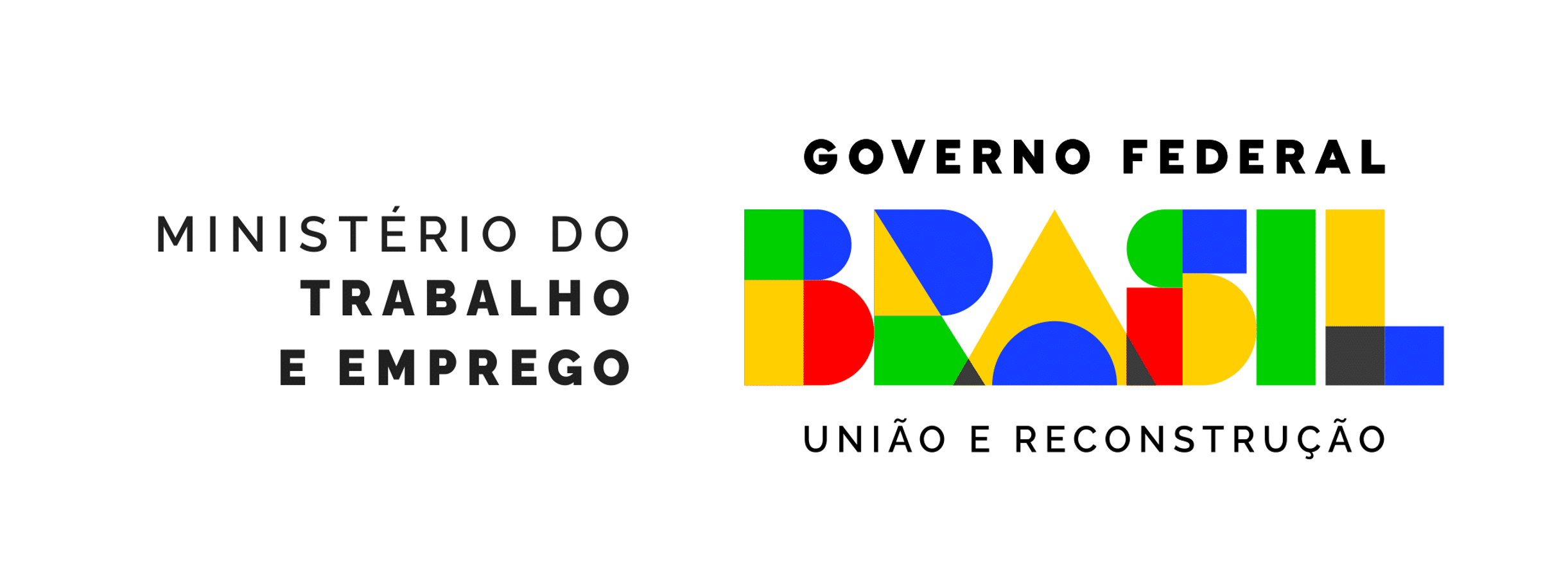

Agency overview
- Formed: 2 May 1974; 52 years ago
- Type: Ministry
- Jurisdiction: Federal government of Brazil
- Headquarters: Esplanada dos Ministérios, Bloco F Brasília, Federal District
- Annual budget: $96.32 b BRL (2023)
- Agency executives: Luiz Marinho, Minister; Francisco Macena da Silva, Executive-Secretary; Luiz Brandão de Mello, Secretary of Labour Inspection; Carlos Gonçalves Junior, Secretary of Labour Protection; Marcos Perioto, Secretary of Labour Affairs; Magno Lavine, Secretary of Qualification and Promotion of Employment and Income Generation; Gilberto Carvalho, Secretary of Popular and Solidarity Economy
- Website: www.gov.br/trabalho-e-emprego/

The Ministry of Labour and Employment (Portuguese: Ministério do Trabalho e Emprego, abbreviated MTE) is a cabinet-level federal ministry in Brazil. The current Minister of Labour is Luiz Marinho.

== List of ministers ==
| No. | Portrait | Minister | Took office | Left office | Time in office | Party | President |
|---|---|---|---|---|---|---|---|
| 1 | Lindolfo Collor | Lindolfo Collor (1890–1942) | 26 November 1930 | 4 April 1932 | 1 year, 130 days | Independent | Getúlio Vargas (Ind) |
| 2 | Joaquim Pedro Salgado Filho | Joaquim Pedro Salgado Filho (1888–1950) | 4 April 1932 | 25 July 1934 | 2 years, 112 days | Independent | Getúlio Vargas (Ind) |
| 3 | Agamenon Magalhães | Agamenon Magalhães (1893–1952) | 25 July 1934 | 25 November 1937 | 3 years, 123 days | Independent | Getúlio Vargas (Ind) |
| 4 | Waldemar Falcão | Waldemar Falcão (1895–1946) | 25 November 1937 | 13 June 1941 | 3 years, 200 days | Independent | Getúlio Vargas (Ind) |
| 5 | Dulfe Pinheiro Machado | Dulfe Pinheiro Machado (1885–1972) | 13 June 1941 | 29 December 1941 | 199 days | Independent | Getúlio Vargas (Ind) |
| 6 | Marcondes Filho | Marcondes Filho (1892–1974) | 29 December 1941 | 29 October 1945 | 3 years, 304 days | Independent | Getúlio Vargas (Ind) |
| 7 | Carneiro de Mendonça | Carneiro de Mendonça (1894–1946) | 29 October 1945 | 31 January 1946 | 94 days | Independent | José Linhares (Ind) |
| 8 | Octacílio Negrão de Lima | Octacílio Negrão de Lima (1897–1960) | 31 January 1946 | 30 October 1946 | 272 days | Independent | Eurico Gaspar Dutra (PSD) |
| 9 | Morvan Dias de Figueiredo | Morvan Dias de Figueiredo (1890–1950) | 30 October 1946 | 30 September 1948 | 1 year, 336 days | Independent | Eurico Gaspar Dutra (PSD) |
| 10 | João Otaviano de Lima Pereira | João Otaviano de Lima Pereira (1887–?) | 30 September 1948 | 22 October 1948 | 22 days | Independent | Eurico Gaspar Dutra (PSD) |
| 11 | Honório Fernandes Monteiro | Honório Fernandes Monteiro (1894–1968) | 22 October 1948 | 29 June 1950 | 1 year, 250 days | PSD | Eurico Gaspar Dutra (PSD) |
| 12 | Marcial Dias Pequeno | Marcial Dias Pequeno (1908–1991) | 29 June 1950 | 31 January 1951 | 216 days | Independent | Eurico Gaspar Dutra (PSD) |
| 13 | Danton Coelho | Danton Coelho (1906–1961) | 31 January 1951 | 5 September 1951 | 217 days | Independent | Getúlio Vargas (PTB) |
| 14 | José de Segadas Viana | José de Segadas Viana (1906–1991) | 5 September 1951 | 17 June 1953 | 1 year, 285 days | PTB | Getúlio Vargas (PTB) |
| 15 | João Goulart | João Goulart (1919–1976) | 18 June 1953 | 23 February 1954 | 250 days | PTB | Getúlio Vargas (PTB) |
| 16 | Hugo de Araújo Faria | Hugo de Araújo Faria (1915–1987) | 24 February 1954 | 24 August 1954 | 181 days | Independent | Getúlio Vargas (PTB) |
| 17 | Napoleão de Alencastro Guimarães | Napoleão de Alencastro Guimarães (1899–1964) | 24 August 1954 | 11 November 1955 | 1 year, 79 days | PSD | Café Filho (PSP); Carlos Luz (PSD) |
| 18 | Nélson Omegna | Nélson Omegna (1903–1987) | 11 November 1955 | 31 January 1956 | 81 days | Independent | Nereu Ramos (PSD) |
| 19 | Parsifal Barroso | Parsifal Barroso (1913–1986) | 31 January 1956 | 30 June 1958 | 2 years, 150 days | PSD | Juscelino Kubitschek (PSD) |
| 20 | Mário Meneghetti | Mário Meneghetti (1905–1969) | 30 June 1958 | 17 July 1958 | 17 days | PSD | Juscelino Kubitschek (PSD) |
| 21 | Fernando Nóbrega | Fernando Nóbrega (1904–1993) | 17 July 1958 | 17 April 1960 | 1 year, 275 days | PSD | Juscelino Kubitschek (PSD) |
| 22 | João Batista Ramos | João Batista Ramos (1910–2002) | 19 April 1960 | 7 November 1960 | 202 days | PTB | Juscelino Kubitschek (PSD) |
| 23 | Alírio Sales Coelho | Alírio Sales Coelho (1904–1975) | 7 November 1960 | 31 January 1961 | 85 days | PSD | Juscelino Kubitschek (PSD) |
| 24 | Francisco Carlos Castro Neves | Francisco Carlos Castro Neves (1914–1974) | 31 January 1961 | 25 August 1961 | 206 days | Independent | Jânio Quadros (PTN) |
| 25 | José de Segadas Viana | José de Segadas Viana (1906–1991) | 28 August 1961 | 8 September 1961 | 11 days | PTB | Ranieri Mazzilli (PSD) |

| No. | Portrait | Minister | Took office | Left office | Time in office | Party | Prime Minister |
|---|---|---|---|---|---|---|---|
| 26 | Franco Montoro | Franco Montoro (1916–1999) | 8 September 1961 | 12 July 1962 | 307 days | PDC | Tancredo Neves (PSD) |
| 27 | Hermes Lima | Hermes Lima (1902–1978) | 12 July 1962 | 31 August 1962 | 50 days | PTB | Brochado da Rocha (PSD) |
| 28 | Benjamin Eurico Cruz | Benjamin Eurico Cruz (1915–1992) | 31 August 1962 | 24 January 1963 | 146 days | Independent | Brochado da Rocha (PSD); Hermes Lima (PTB) |

| No. | Portrait | Minister | Took office | Left office | Time in office | Party | President |
|---|---|---|---|---|---|---|---|
| 29 | Almino Monteiro Álvares Afonso | Almino Monteiro Álvares Afonso (born 1929) | 24 January 1963 | 18 June 1963 | 145 days | PTB | João Goulart (PTB) |
| 30 | Amaury de Oliveira e Silva | Amaury de Oliveira e Silva (1924–2002) | 18 June 1963 | 31 March 1964 | 287 days | Independent | João Goulart (PTB) |
| 31 | Arnaldo Lopes Süssekind | Arnaldo Lopes Süssekind (1917–2012) | 4 April 1964 | 7 December 1965 | 1 year, 247 days | Independent | Ranieri Mazzilli (PSD); Castelo Branco (Military dictatorship) |
| 32 | Walter Peracchi Barcelos | Walter Peracchi Barcelos (1907–1986) | 7 December 1965 | 18 July 1966 | 223 days | ARENA | Castelo Branco (ARENA) |
| 33 | Paulo Egydio Martins | Paulo Egydio Martins (1928–2021) | 18 July 1966 | 1 August 1966 | 14 days | ARENA | Castelo Branco (ARENA) |
| 34 | Luís Gonzaga do Nascimento e Silva | Luís Gonzaga do Nascimento e Silva (1915–2003) | 1 August 1966 | 15 March 1967 | 226 days | Independent | Castelo Branco (ARENA) |
| 35 | Jarbas Passarinho | Jarbas Passarinho (1920–2016) | 15 March 1967 | 30 October 1969 | 2 years, 229 days | ARENA | Costa e Silva (ARENA); Military Junta of 1969 (Military junta) |
| 36 | Júlio Barata | Júlio Barata (1905–1991) | 30 October 1969 | 15 March 1974 | 4 years, 136 days | Independent | Emílio Garrastazu Médici (ARENA) |
| 37 | Arnaldo da Costa Prieto | Arnaldo da Costa Prieto (1930–2012) | 2 May 1974 | 15 March 1979 | 4 years, 317 days | ARENA | Ernesto Geisel (ARENA) |
| 38 | Murilo Macedo | Murilo Macedo (1923–2003) | 15 March 1979 | 15 March 1985 | 6 years, 0 days | PDS | João Figueiredo (PDS) |
| 39 | Almir Pazzianotto | Almir Pazzianotto (born 1936) | 15 March 1985 | 27 September 1988 | 3 years, 196 days | MDB | José Sarney (MDB) |
| 40 | Erós Antônio de Almeida | Erós Antônio de Almeida (born 1941) | 27 September 1988 | 28 October 1988 | 31 days | Independent | José Sarney (MDB) |
| 41 | Ronaldo Costa Couto | Ronaldo Costa Couto (born 1942) | 28 October 1988 | 13 January 1989 | 77 days | MDB | José Sarney (MDB) |
| 42 | Dorothea Werneck | Dorothea Werneck (born 1948) | 13 January 1989 | 15 March 1990 | 1 year, 61 days | Independent | José Sarney (MDB) |
| 43 | Antônio Rogério Magri | Antônio Rogério Magri (born 1940) | 15 March 1990 | 20 January 1992 | 1 year, 311 days | PTB | Fernando Collor (PRN) |
| 44 | Reinhold Stephanes | Reinhold Stephanes (born 1939) | 20 January 1992 | 13 April 1992 | 84 days | PFL | Fernando Collor (PRN) |
| 45 | João Mellão Neto | João Mellão Neto (1955–2020) | 13 April 1992 | 4 October 1992 | 174 days | PFL | Fernando Collor (PRN) |
| 46 | Walter Barelli | Walter Barelli (1938–2019) | 4 October 1992 | 4 May 1994 | 1 year, 212 days | PSDB | Itamar Franco (MDB) |
| 47 | Marcelo Pimentel | Marcelo Pimentel (1925–2018) | 4 May 1994 | 1 January 1995 | 242 days | Independent | Itamar Franco (MDB) |
| 48 | Paulo de Tarso Almeida Paiva | Paulo de Tarso Almeida Paiva (born 1940) | 1 January 1995 | 30 March 1998 | 3 years, 88 days | Independent | Fernando Henrique Cardoso (PSDB) |
| – | Antonio Anastasia | Antonio Anastasia (born 1961); Acting | 30 March 1998 | 6 April 1998 | 7 days | PSDB | Fernando Henrique Cardoso (PSDB) |
| 49 | Edward Swaelen | Edward Swaelen (born 1956) | 6 April 1998 | 1 January 1999 | 270 days | Independent | Fernando Henrique Cardoso (PSDB) |
| 50 | Francisco Dornelles | Francisco Dornelles (1935–2023) | 1 January 1999 | 8 April 2002 | 3 years, 97 days | PP | Fernando Henrique Cardoso (PSDB) |
| 51 | Paulo Jobim Filho | Paulo Jobim Filho (born 1952) | 8 April 2002 | 1 January 2003 | 268 days | Independent | Fernando Henrique Cardoso (PSDB) |
| 52 | Jaques Wagner | Jaques Wagner (born 1951) | 1 January 2003 | 23 January 2004 | 1 year, 22 days | PT | Luiz Inácio Lula da Silva (PT) |
| 53 | Ricardo Berzoini | Ricardo Berzoini (born 1960) | 23 January 2004 | 12 July 2005 | 1 year, 170 days | PT | Luiz Inácio Lula da Silva (PT) |
| 54 | Luiz Marinho | Luiz Marinho (born 1959) | 12 July 2005 | 29 March 2007 | 1 year, 260 days | PT | Luiz Inácio Lula da Silva (PT) |
| 55 | Carlos Lupi | Carlos Lupi (born 1957) | 29 March 2007 | 5 December 2011 | 4 years, 251 days | PDT | Luiz Inácio Lula da Silva (PT); Dilma Rousseff (PT) |
| – | Paulo Roberto dos Santos Pinto | Paulo Roberto dos Santos Pinto (born 1972); Acting | 5 December 2011 | 3 May 2012 | 150 days | Independent | Dilma Rousseff (PT) |
| 56 | Brizola Neto | Brizola Neto (born 1978) | 3 May 2012 | 15 March 2013 | 316 days | PDT | Dilma Rousseff (PT) |
| 57 | Manoel Dias | Manoel Dias (1938–2026) | 15 March 2013 | 2 October 2015 | 2 years, 201 days | PDT | Dilma Rousseff (PT) |
| 58 | Miguel Rossetto | Miguel Rossetto (born 1960) | 2 October 2015 | 12 May 2016 | 223 days | PT | Dilma Rousseff (PT) |
| 59 | Ronaldo Nogueira | Ronaldo Nogueira (born 1966) | 12 May 2016 | 27 December 2017 | 1 year, 229 days | PTB | Michel Temer (MDB) |
| – | Vacant | Vacant; Acting | 27 December 2017 | 10 April 2018 | 104 days | Vacant | Michel Temer (MDB) |
| 60 | Helton Yomura | Helton Yomura (born 1984) | 10 April 2018 | 5 July 2018 | 86 days | PTB | Michel Temer (MDB) |
| – | Eliseu Padilha | Eliseu Padilha (1945–2023); Acting | 5 July 2018 | 9 July 2018 | 4 days | MDB | Michel Temer (MDB) |
| 61 | Caio Vieira de Mello | Caio Vieira de Mello (born 1949) | 9 July 2018 | 1 January 2019 | 176 days | Independent | Michel Temer (MDB) |
| 62 | Onyx Lorenzoni | Onyx Lorenzoni (born 1954) | 28 July 2021 | 31 March 2022 | 246 days | DEM | Jair Bolsonaro (PL) |
| 63 | José Carlos Oliveira | José Carlos Oliveira (born 1965) | 31 March 2022 | 1 January 2023 | 276 days | Independent | Jair Bolsonaro (PL) |
| 64 | Luiz Marinho | Luiz Marinho (born 1959) | 1 January 2023 | Incumbent | 3 years, 290 days | PT | Luiz Inácio Lula da Silva (PT) |

== See also ==
- Other ministries of Labour
- Other ministries of Employment
