= List of women's international rugby union test matches =

The following is a list of women's international rugby union matches and tournaments.

For a list of games involving advertised "A" teams and other games of doubtful international status, see the related article Women's international rugby union (non test matches).

== Overall ==
(Full internationals only, updated to 27 February 2026)

Internationals From 1982
Team	First Match	Played	Won	Drawn	Lost	For	Against	Win %
Andorra	2024	1	1	0	0	119	0	100.00%
Australia	1994	95	34	1	60	1763	2443	35.79%
Austria	2025	1	1	0	0	20	7	100.00%
Bahamas	2010	2	0	0	2	0	113	0.00%
Barbados	2009	3	1	0	2	52	132	33.33%
Belgium	1986	45	13	1	31	529	1594	28.89%
Bosnia and Herzegovina	2005	4	0	0	4	0	191	0.00%
Botswana	2013	2	0	0	2	15	41	0.00%
Brazil	2008	20	5	0	15	301	530	25.00%
Bulgaria	2023	4	0	0	4	27	239	0.00%
Burkina Faso	2021	4	0	0	4	13	174	0.00%
Cameroon	2021	10	4	0	6	167	278	40.00%
Canada	1987	183	96	4	83	4142	3632	52.46%
(Caribbean Community) Caribbean Select XV	2010	4	1	0	3	90	163	25.00%
Cayman Islands	2004	12	4	0	8	227	290	33.33%
China	2006	13	9	0	4	411	166	69.23%
Colombia	2019	18	10	0	8	426	497	55.56%
Croatia	2023	3	2	0	1	59	70	66.67%
Czech Republic	2013	22	7	1	14	239	498	31.82%
Denmark	2003	7	1	2	4	72	341	14.29%
El Salvador	2020	1	0	0	1	5	50	0.00%
England	1987	339	290	4	45	12223	3351	85.55%
Fiji	2006	48	23	0	25	1554	1124	47.92%
Finland	2007	32	7	2	23	397	915	21.88%
France	1982	293	198	5	90	6975	3631	67.58%
Georgia	2025	2	2	0	0	98	5	100.00%
Germany	1989	77	24	1	52	1010	2159	31.17%
Great Britain	1986	8	5	0	3	139	59	62.50%
Guatemala	2020	1	1	0	0	50	5	100.00%
Guyana	2006	5	3	1	1	73	35	60.00%
Hong Kong	1998	65	26	1	38	1117	1882	40.00%
India	2018	4	1	0	3	58	100	25.00%
Ireland	1993	217	89	1	127	3306	4313	41.01%
Italy	1985	205	79	4	122	3200	4555	38.54%
Ivory Coast	2021	7	1	0	6	63	256	14.29%
Jamaica	2003	15	7	0	8	267	225	46.67%
Japan	1991	94	46	2	46	2180	2198	48.94%
Kazakhstan	1993	81	38	0	43	1549	1818	46.91%
Kenya	2006	47	24	2	21	958	817	51.06%
Kyrgyzstan	2008	3	0	0	3	0	121	0.00%
Laos	2011	5	0	0	5	12	253	0.00%
Latvia	2023	5	2	1	2	99	119	40.00%
Luxembourg	2007	5	1	0	4	27	162	20.00%
Madagascar	2019	20	7	1	12	317	702	35.00%
Malaysia	2009	4	1	1	2	93	159	25.00%
Mexico	2024	5	3	0	2	133	121	60.00%
Namibia	2013	4	1	0	3	39	285	25.00%
Netherlands	1982	148	77	1	70	3258	2485	52.03%
New Zealand	1990	144	119	2	23	5614	1618	82.64%
Norway	2003	20	4	2	14	161	728	20.00%
Papua New Guinea	2016	15	0	1	14	157	1017	0.00%
Philippines	2011	11	4	0	7	151	385	36.36%
Portugal	1995	17	9	0	8	369	226	52.94%
Romania	2007	11	5	0	6	204	176	45.45%
Russia	1994	50	24	0	26	952	1360	48.00%
Rwanda	2005	2	0	0	2	0	173	0.00%
Saint Vincent and the Grenadines	2009	3	0	0	3	0	215	0.00%
Samoa	2000	53	25	3	25	1303	1362	47.17%
Scotland	1993	247	99	2	146	3681	5369	40.08%
Senegal	2021	4	1	0	3	80	77	25.00%
Serbia	2007	4	0	0	4	0	167	0.00%
Singapore	2006	31	8	2	21	488	815	25.81%
South Africa	2004	90	41	2	47	2417	2365	45.56%
Soviet Union	1990	6	0	0	6	4	164	0.00%
Spain	1989	178	94	3	81	3893	3240	52.81%
Sweden	1984	95	32	0	63	1093	2257	33.68%
Switzerland	2011	23	10	0	13	373	555	43.48%
Thailand	2005	9	5	0	4	197	212	55.56%
Tonga	2006	18	5	0	13	370	730	27.78%
Trinidad and Tobago	2003	17	12	1	4	561	265	70.59%
Tunisia	2021	9	7	0	2	254	118	77.78%
Uganda	2005	41	17	3	21	765	905	41.46%
United States	1987	163	68	3	92	3272	3919	41.72%
Uzbekistan	2008	4	2	0	2	29	128	50.00%
Wales	1987	252	90	4	158	3379	5633	35.71%
World XV	1990	3	0	0	3	23	87	0.00%
Zambia	2007	6	4	0	2	177	110	66.67%
Zimbabwe	2007	11	3	0	8	195	354	27.27%

== 1982 ==
=== Tournaments ===
- None

=== Other matches ===
13 June 1982 (Note: First women's international)

Netherlands	0–4	France
		Try: 62' I. Decamp

Sportpark Strijland, Utrecht
Referee: Roel Wijnant (Belgium)

== 1983 ==
=== Tournaments ===
- None

=== Other matches ===
5 June 1983

France	10–0	Netherlands

La Teste

== 1984 ==
=== Tournaments ===
None

=== Other matches ===
27 May 1984

Netherlands	0–3	France

Hilversum

21 October 1984

Sweden	0–34	Netherlands

Malmö

== 1985 ==
=== Tournaments ===
None

=== Other matches ===
2 June 1985

France	20–0	Netherlands

Bourg-en-Bresse

22 June 1985

Italy	0–0	France

Riccione

10 October 1985

Netherlands	19–0	Sweden

Nijmegen

== 1986 ==
=== Tournaments ===
None

=== Other matches ===
19 April 1986

Great Britain	8–14	France

Richmond (Note: First International in the British Isles)

1 May 1986

Netherlands	10–0	France

Enschede

18 May 1986

France	12–0	Italy

Bardos

17 October 1986

Netherlands	11–6	Sweden

Castricum

31 December 1986

Belgium	0–32	Sweden

Brussels

== 1987 ==
=== Tournaments ===
None

=== Other matches ===
5 April 1987

Wales	4–22	England

Pontypool Park (Note: The first home nations international. Video highlights of the game can be seen here)

2 May 1987

France	28–6	Great Britain

Chalon-sur-Saône

17 May 1987

Italy	4–16	France

Rome

31 May 1987

France	22–3	Netherlands

Chalon-sur-Saône

14 November 1987

Canada	3–22	United States

Victoria, British Columbia (Note: First International in North America)

22 November 1987

Great Britain	16–0	Netherlands

Richmond

== 1988 ==
=== Tournaments ===
Test#	Dates	Event	Location
20-25	21 May 1988 to 23 May 1988	European Cup	Bourg-en-Bresse, France

=== Other matches ===
24 April 1988

Wales	6–36	England

Newport RFC

8 August 1988

United States	26–10	Canada

Saranac Lake

15 October 1988

England	40–0	Sweden

Waterloo

27 November 1988

Belgium	0–66	France

Brussels

27 November 1988

Netherlands	3–0	Wales

Utrecht

== 1989 ==
=== Tournaments ===
None

=== Other matches ===
12 February 1989

England	38–4	Wales

Moseley RFC

4 March 1989

Great Britain	13–0	France

Rosslyn Park

20 April 1989

Italy	26–14	Netherlands

Rome

2 May 1989

Spain	0–28	France

?

3 September 1989

Canada	3–28	United States

Edmonton

14 October 1989

West Germany	0–8	Sweden

Berlin

== 1990 ==
=== Tournaments ===
Test#	Dates	Event	Location
39-45	28 August 1990 to 1 September 1990	RugbyFest 1990	Christchurch, New Zealand

=== Other matches ===
11 February 1990

Wales	12–18	England

Neath RFC (Note: This match, and preparations for it, were filmed by Channel 4 for a documentary called "Rugby Women", a copy of which is held in the National Film Archive at the British Film Institute)

18 March 1990

Great Britain	32–0	Italy

Moseley (Note: This was the final Great Britain international and also featured in the Channel 4 documentary called "Rugby Women", a copy of which is held in the National Film Archive at the British Film Institute)

14 April 1990

Netherlands	0–10	France

?

21 October 1990

Netherlands	0–26	England

Utrecht

== 1991 ==
=== Tournaments ===
Test#	Dates	Event	Location
48-69	4 April 1991 to 14 April 1991	World Cup	Cardiff

=== Other matches ===
24 March 1991

England	24–13	Wales

Waterloo

9 November 1991

Sweden	20–6	Germany

Trelleborg

== 1992 ==
=== Tournaments ===
None

=== Other matches ===
9 February 1992

Wales	10–14	England

National Stadium Cardiff

13 June 1992

France	14–10	Spain

Agen

13 September 1992

United States	13–12	Canada

Blaine, Minnesota

17 October 1992

Germany	0–39	Netherlands

Hanover

15 November 1992

France	24–0	Netherlands

Fécamp

== 1993 ==
=== Tournaments ===
Test#	Dates	Event	Location
80-85	8 June 1993 to 12 June 1993	Canada Cup	Fletcher's Fields, Toronto

=== Other matches ===
14 February 1993

Scotland	10–0	Ireland

Raeburn Place, Edinburgh (Note: First International for both Ireland and Scotland at the site of the first-ever men's international.)

13 March 1993

Italy	8–5	Netherlands

Stadio Comunale, Rho

14 March 1993

England	23–5	Wales

Northampton RFC

4 April 1993

Italy	0–24	France

Rovigo

10 October 1993

Netherlands	53–0	Germany

Delft

31 October 1993

Germany	11–10	Kazakhstan

Hanover

19 December 1993

Scotland	0–23	Wales

Burnbrae, Glasgow

== 1994 ==
=== Tournaments ===
Test#	Dates	Event	Location
92-117	11 April 1994 to 24 April 1994	World Cup	Edinburgh, Scotland
120	2 September 1994	Laurie O'Reilly Cup	Sydney

=== Other matches ===
13 February 1994

Ireland	0–5	Scotland

Ravenhill, Belfast

13 February 1994

Wales	10–11	England

Bridgend

18 February 1994

England	32–8	France

Wolverhampton

24 April 1994

Scotland	60–0	Sweden

Meggetland

16 May 1994

Spain	0–3	Italy

Madrid

19 November 1994

Germany	12–0	Sweden

Hamburg

28 November 1994

Germany	3–15	Kazakhstan

Hanover

18 December 1994

Wales	0–5	Scotland

The Brewery Field, Bridgend

18 December 1994

England	30–5	Netherlands

Wasps RFC

== 1995 ==
=== Tournaments ===
Test#	Dates	Event	Location
129-132	12 April 1995 to 16 April 1995	FIRA European Championship	Treviso, Italy
135	22 July 1995	Laurie O'Reilly Cup	Auckland

=== Other matches ===
12 February 1995

England	25–0	Wales

Sale RFC

18 February 1995

Scotland	20–3	Ireland

Myreside, Edinburgh

5 March 1995

Ireland	10–39	France

Dublin

19 March 1995

Wales	25–0	Ireland

Cardiff

30 April 1995

Scotland	10–12	Italy

Meggetland, Edinburgh

14 May 1995

Germany	50–0	Portugal

Heidelberg

23 September 1995

Netherlands	5–3	Scotland

Amsterdam

== 1996 ==
=== Tournaments ===
Test#	Dates	Event	Location
138–139, 141-144	1996-01-21 to 1996-03-03	Women's Home Nations Championship	Various
145-151	1996-04-08 to 1996-04-14	FIRA European Championship	Madrid, Spain
153	1996-08-31 to 1996-08-31	Laurie O'Reilly Cup	Sydney
154-159	1996-09-08 to 1996-09-14	Canada Cup	Edmonton, Canada

=== Other matches ===
18 February 1996

France	6–15	England

Villand Bonnot

24 August 1996

Germany	3–53	Kazakhstan

Hanover

30 November 1996

Scotland	27–3	Netherlands

Meggetland

== 1997 ==
=== Tournaments ===
Test#	Dates	Event	Location
162–165,167-168	1997-01-12 to 1997-03-09	Women's Home Nations Championship	Various
169-180	1997-04-02 to 1997-04-06	FIRA European Championship	Nice, France
188	1997-08-16 to 1997-08-16	Laurie O'Reilly Cup	Dunedin

=== Other matches ===
5 January 1997

England	17–15	Spain

Leeds

23 February 1997

England	15–17	France

Northampton

6 July 1997

Canada	12–21	United States

Ajax, Ontario

2 August 1997

Australia	24–28	United States

Brisbane

5 August 1997

Sweden	0–42	Scotland

Stockholm

13 August 1997

New Zealand	67–0	England

Burnham

31 August 1997

Germany	0–84	England

Hürth

26 October 1997

Netherlands	31–7	Germany

Amsterdam

9 November 1997

Germany	6–32	Ireland

Hamburg

7 December 1997

Spain	15–15	England

Toledo

?? ?? 1997

Kazakhstan	5–7	Russia

?

?? ?? 1997

Kazakhstan	0–15	Russia

?

?? ?? 1997

Kazakhstan	12–35	Russia

?

== 1998 ==
=== Tournaments ===
Test#	Dates	Event	Location
194, 197, 199-202	1998-02-08 to 1998-04-05	Women's Home Nations Championship	Various
205-244	1998-05-01 to 1998-05-16	World Cup	Amsterdam, Netherlands
245	1998-08-29 to 1998-08-29	Laurie O'Reilly Cup	Sydney Football Stadium, Sydney

=== Other matches ===
1 February 1998

France	5–13	England

Villeneuve-d'Ascq, Lille

15 February 1998

Netherlands	5–29	Spain

Amsterdam

15 February 1998

Spain	29–3	Kazakhstan

Hospitalet de Llobregat

21 February 1998

Scotland	19–3	France

Raeburn Place, Edinburgh

8 April 1998

Japan	42–14	Hong Kong

Kumagaya Rugby Stadium

12 April 1998

Japan	39–0	Hong Kong

Kumagaya Rugby Stadium

5 December 1998

Spain	3–5	Scotland

Madrid

== 1999 ==
=== Tournaments ===
Test#	Dates	Event	Location
247–254, 156-157	1999-03-05 to 1999-04-09	Women's Five Nations Championship	Various
259-270	1999-04-19 to 1999-04-24	FIRA European Championship	Belluno, Italy
272-274	1999-10-13 to 1999-10-19	Triangular '99	Palmerston North, New Zealand

=== Other matches ===
9 April 1999

Germany	12–19	Netherlands

Hanover

11 April 1999

Germany	6–34	Kazakhstan

Hanover

8 August 1999

United States	16–11	Canada

Saranac Lake, New York

== 2000 ==
=== Tournaments ===
Test#	Dates	Event	Location
276–279, 281-286	2000-02-04 to 2000-04-01	Women's Five Nations Championship	Various
287-301	2000-05-08 to 2000-05-13	FIRA European Championship	Almería, Spain
305-310	2000-09-23 to 2000-09-30	Canada Cup	Winnipeg
311	2000-12-15 to 2000-12-15	Asian World Cup qualifier	Aberdeen Park, Hong Kong

=== Other matches ===
9 January 2000

Spain	10–41	England

Barcelona

20 February 2000

Netherlands	54–7	Belgium

Amsterdam

6 June 2000

United States	10–17	Canada

New York City

12 August 2000

Germany	5–30	Sweden

Hanover

1 September 2000

Samoa	10–12	Japan

Apia Park

== 2001 ==
=== Tournaments ===
Test#	Dates	Event	Location
313–314, 317–322, 324-325	2001-02-03 to 2001-04-08	Women's Five Nations Championship	Various
326-343	2001-05-06 to 2001-05-12	FIRA European Championship	Lille

=== Other matches ===
15 January 2001

Wales	72–5	Netherlands

Bridgend

9 February 2001

Spain	42–0	Ireland

Madrid

16 February 2001

Ireland	0–53	France

Dublin

8 April 2001

Netherlands	105–0	Belgium

Amsterdam

26 May 2001

Australia	19–41	England

T.G.Milner, Eastwood, Sydney

2 June 2001

Australia	5–15	England

Newcastle, New South Wales

9 June 2001

New Zealand	15–10	England

Rotorua

16 June 2001

New Zealand	17–22	England

North Harbour Stadium, Albany, North Shore City

7 July 2001

Canada	23–3	United States

Twin Elm Park, Ottawa

5 August 2001

United States	22–21	Canada

Saranac Lake, New York

18 October 2001

Wales	7–21	Canada

Glamorgan Wanderers

21 October 2001

Wales	11–12	Canada

Caerphilly

24 October 2001

Netherlands	0–15	Ireland

Amsterdam

28 October 2001

Wales	13–13	Canada

Ebbw Vale

11 November 2001

Scotland	13–3	Sweden

Edinburgh

18 November 2001

Wales	17–20	United States

Ebbw Vale

24 November 2001

Scotland	22–3	United States

Inverleith

== 2002 ==
=== Tournaments ===
Test#	Dates	Event	Location
358–366, 371-376	2002-02-02 to 2002-04-07	Women's Six Nations Championship	Various
367-370	2002-03-20 to 2002-03-23	FIRA ENC XV-a-side Tournament	Treviso, Italy
377-408	2002-05-13 to 2002-05-25	World Cup	Barcelona, Spain

=== Other matches ===
4 January 2002

Spain	15–5	France

San Sebastián

24 November 2002

Scotland	34–3	Sweden

Murrayfield, Edinburgh (Note: First women's match at Murrayfield)

== 2003 ==
=== Tournaments ===
Test#	Dates	Event	Location
410-424	2003-02-15 to 2003-03-29	Women's Six Nations Championship	Various
425-432	2003-05-01 to 2003-05-11	FIRA European Championship	Malmö, Sweden & Amsterdam, Netherlands
433-436	2003-06-14 to 2003-06-28	Churchill Cup	Thunderbird Stadium, Vancouver
440-441	2003-12-03 to 2003-12-04	NAWIRA Caribbean Women's 15-a-side Championship	Port of Spain

=== Other matches ===
6 July 2003

Sweden	5–49	Scotland

Linköping

4 October 2003

New Zealand	37–0	World XV

Eden Park, Auckland

11 October 2003

New Zealand	38–19	World XV

Okara Park, Whangārei

== 2004 ==
=== Tournaments ===
Test#	Dates	Event	Location
442-456	2004-02-14 to 2004-03-27	Women's Six Nations Championship	Various
457-474	2004-05-01 to 2004-05-08	FIRA European Championship	Toulouse, France
478–480, 482-483	2004-06-08 to 2004-06-19	Churchill Cup	Vancouver, Calgary, and Edmonton

=== Other matches ===
29 May 2004

South Africa	5–8	Wales

Adcock Stadium, Port Elizabeth

5 June 2004

Austria	5–5	Czech Republic

Hohe Warte, Vienna

5 June 2004

South Africa	15–16	Wales

Loftus Versfeld, Pretoria

19 June 2004

Jamaica	15–3	Cayman Islands

Montego Bay

6 November 2004

Netherlands	15–7	Japan

Amsterdam

14 November 2004

England	45–5	Canada

Richmond

14 November 2004

Ireland	55–0	Japan

Donnybrook, Dublin

17 November 2004

England	41–3	Canada

Newbury

27 November 2004

Scotland	6–12	United States

Murrayfield, Edinburgh

== 2005 ==
=== Tournaments ===
Test#	Dates	Event	Location
489–495, 497-504	2005-02-04 to 2005-03-19	Women's Six Nations Championship	Various
505–508, 512-517	2005-04-07 to 2005-05-23	FIRA European Championship	Hamburg, Germany and Zenica, Bosnia
518-521	2005-06-03 to 2005-06-03	Asian World Cup Qualifiers	Bangkok, Thailand
522-525	2005-06-29 to 2005-07-05	Canada Cup	Ottawa

=== Other matches ===
26 February 2005

Rwanda	0–92	Uganda

Kigali

30 April 2005

Austria	5–5 (Note: Some sources give the score as 7–7)	Czech Republic

Hohe Warte, Vienna

30 April 2005

Wales	9–24	South Africa

Ebbw Vale RFC

14 May 2005

England	101–0	South Africa

Imber Court RFC

15 October 2005

Samoa	0–53	England

Ericsson Stadium, Auckland

22 October 2005

New Zealand	33–8	England

Waikato Stadium, Hamilton

22 October 2005

Italy	11–14	Wales

Treviso

26 October 2005

New Zealand	24–15	England

Eden Park, Auckland

11 November 2005

France	13–5	Canada

Nantes

19 November 2005

France	29–0	Canada

Nanterre

10 December 2005

Uganda	81–0	Rwanda

Kampala

== 2006 ==
=== Tournaments ===
Test#	Dates	Event	Location
535-549	2006-02-04 to 2006-03-18	Women's Six Nations Championship	Various
551-553	2006-04-14 to 2006-04-22	Pacific tri-nations	Teufaiva Park, Nukuʻalofa, Tonga
554–562, 564-566	2006-04-23 to 2006-04-30	FIRA ENC XV Championship	Treviso, Italy
568, 573	2006-05-13 to 2006-08-12	Elgon Cup	Kampala and Nairobi
574-603	2006-08-31 to 2006-09-17	World Cup	Edmonton, Canada
604-606	2006-09-28 to 2006-09-30	NAWIRA Caribbean Women's Championship	Kingston, Jamaica
607–608, 610-611	2006-11-17 to 2006-11-19	ARFU Women's Rugby Championship	Kunming, China

=== Other matches ===
21 January 2006

Scotland	6–13	United States

Netherdale, Gala

25 January 2006

Ireland	5–23	United States

Limerick

25 March 2006

Belgium	15–7	Netherlands

Brussels

29 April 2006

Ireland	15–8	Canada

Galway

6 May 2006

Wales	16–11	Canada

Glamorgan Wanderers

10 June 2006

United States	25–10	Canada

Boulder, Colorado

13 June 2006

United States	18–20	Canada

Boulder, Colorado

17 June 2006

South Africa	35–0	Netherlands

Port Elizabeth

24 June 2006

South Africa	42–12	Netherlands

Durban

18 November 2006

Wales	31–7	Italy

Glamorgan Wanderers

3 December 2006

Wales	24–0	Netherlands

Llanrumney

== 2007 ==
=== Tournaments ===
Test#	Dates	Event	Location
613-627	2007-02-03 to 2007-03-18	Women's Six Nations Championship	Various
629-656	2007-04-11 to 2007-05-05	FIRA European Championship	Belgium and Barcelona, Spain
660-661	2007-10-16 to 2007-10-20	2007 Laurie O'Reilly Cup	Wanganui and Porirua, New Zealand
663–664, 666-667	2007-11-02 to 2007-11-04	ARFU Women's Rugby Championship	Kunming, China

=== Other matches ===
1 April 2007

Netherlands	62–5	Belgium

Eindhoven

27 August 2007

United States	5–18	Canada

Blaine, Minnesota

29 August 2007

United States	7–45	Canada

Blaine, Minnesota

22 September 2007

Zimbabwe	0–28	Zambia

Harare (Note: There are reports that there may have been an earlier game, played between 2004 and 2006, won by Zambia by 88-0)

28 October 2007

Germany	37–0	Luxembourg

Heidelberg

4 November 2007

Scotland	3–45	Canada

Glasgow

9 November 2007

Wales	3–25	Canada

Cardiff

1 December 2007

Belgium	7–19	Netherlands

Ghent

15 December 2007

England	34–0	United States

London Irish

== 2008 ==
=== Tournaments ===
Test#	Dates	Event	Location
671-685	2008-02-01 to 2008-03-16	Women's Six Nations Championship	Various
688–691, 693-694	2008-05-05 to 2008-05-10	NAWIRA Caribbean Women's Championship	Georgetown, Guyana
695-716	2008-05-17 to 2008-05-24	FIRA European Championship	Amsterdam
717, 726	2008-05-24 to 2008-08-16	Elgon Cup	Kampala and Nairobi
718-724	2008-06-03 to 2008-06-07	ARFU Women's Rugby Championship	Taldykorgan, Kazakhstan
728-730	2008-08-22 to 2008-08-26	Nations Cup	Esher, England
732-733	2008-10-14 to 2008-10-18	2008 Laurie O'Reilly Cup	Canberra, Australia

=== Other matches ===
16 March 2008

Germany	0–43	Netherlands

Aachen

20 April 2008

Netherlands	50–10	Germany

Valkenswaard

10 May 2008

Netherlands	10–0	Brazil

Amsterdam

14 June 2008

Jamaica	15–0	Cayman Islands

Kingston, Jamaica

19 August 2008

England	50–3	United States

Esher

29 August 2008

England	24–0	Canada

Esher

2 November 2008

Germany	12–5	Sweden

Hanover

4 December 2008

Singapore	10–10	Hong Kong

St Andrew's School, Singapore

5 December 2008

Singapore	0–5	Hong Kong

Yio Chu Kang Stadium, Singapore

== 2009 ==
=== Tournaments ===
Test#	Dates	Event	Location
738-752	2009-02-06 to 2009-03-22	Women's Six Nations Championship	Various
755-766	2009-05-17 to 2009-05-23	FIRA European Trophy (World Cup Qualifier)	Stockholm and Enköping
767-772	2009-06-21 to 2009-06-27	NAWIRA Caribbean Women's Championship	Bridgetown, Barbados
774	2009-08-08 to 2009-08-08	Oceania World Cup Qualifier	Samoa
775–778, 780-785	2009-08-10 to 2009-08-24	Nations Cup	Oakville, Canada
779, 786	2009-08-15 to 2009-08-29	Elgon Cup	Kampala and Nairobi
790-793	2009-11-04 to 2009-11-06	Asia World Cup Qualifier	Singapore

=== Other matches ===
10 January 2009

Scotland	32–0	Sweden

Meggetland

25 April 2009

Sweden	0–24	Netherlands

Norrköping

26 April 2009

Sweden	3–7	Netherlands

Norrköping

27 June 2009

United States	17–25	Canada

Infinity Park, Glendale, Colorado

3 October 2009

Singapore	63–0	Malaysia

Yio Chu Kang Stadium, Singapore

10 October 2009

Hong Kong	22–17	Singapore

So Kan Poh Stadium, Hong Kong

24 October 2009

Norway	5–22	Finland

Oslo

14 November 2009

England	3–16	New Zealand

Esher

18 November 2009

France	5–14	Canada

Dijon

21 November 2009

England	10–3	New Zealand

Twickenham

21 November 2009

France	22–0	Canada

Stade de France, Saint-Denis

28 November 2009

Wales	56–7	Sweden

St Helen's, Swansea

== 2010 ==
=== Tournaments ===
Test#	Dates	Event	Location
801-815	2010-02-05 to 2010-03-21	Women's Six Nations Championship	Various
822-833	2019-05-08 to 2010-05-15	FIRA European Trophy	Alsace-Lorraine
840-841	2010-07-03 to 2010-07-10	Elgon Cup	Kampala and Nairobi
843–848, 850-873	2010-08-20 to 2010-09-05	2010 Women's Rugby World Cup	London
849	2010-08-21 to 2010-08-21	Caribbean Women's Championship	Nassau, Bahamas

=== Other matches ===
12 January 2010

United States	8–18	Canada

Lakeland, Florida

16 January 2010

United States	11–10	Canada

Lakeland, Florida

2 April 2010

Netherlands	19–0	Sweden

Leiden

4 April 2010

Netherlands	20–7	Sweden

Amsterdam

8 April 2010

Kazakhstan	17–22	South Africa

Al Ain, Dubai

10 April 2010

Kazakhstan	0–38	South Africa

Al Ain, Dubai

18 April 2010

Netherlands	83–0	Germany

Maastricht

8 May 2010

Uganda	10–10	Kenya

Kampala

22 May 2010

Japan	17–0	Hong Kong

Prince Chichibu Memorial Stadium, Tokyo

22 May 2010

Kenya	8–0	Uganda

Nairobi

5 June 2010

Scotland	8–27	South Africa

Lasswade

12 June 2010

Scotland	17–41	South Africa

Lasswade

14 June 2010

Canada	14–8	United States

Shawnigan Lake School

18 June 2010

Canada	34–22	United States

Bear Mountain Stadium, Langford

19 August 2010

Bahamas	0–65	(Caribbean Community) Caribbean Select XV

Nassau, Bahamas

18 December 2010

Malaysia	0–81	Hong Kong

Royal Selangor Club, Kuala Lumpur

== 2011 ==
=== Tournaments ===
Test#	Dates	Event	Location
876-890	2011-02-04 to 2011-03-20	Women's Six Nations Championship	Various
892-897	2011-04-30 to 2011-05-07	FIRA European Trophy	A Coruña, Spain
900, 907	2011-07-09 to 2011-07-16	Elgon Cup	Nairobi and Kampala
901-906	2011-07-10 to 2011-07-15	NACRA Women's Championship	Cayman Islands
908-915	2011-08-02 to 2011-08-13	Nations Cup	Oakville, Canada
920–923, 925-926	2011-11-24 to 2011-11-26	Asian Championship (II Division)	Chao Anou Vong stadium, Vientiane, Laos

=== Other matches ===
3 January 2011

Spain	28–13	Scotland

Madrid

29 April 2011

Hong Kong	0–15	Japan

Hong Kong

14 May 2011

Kazakhstan	58–3	Uzbekistan

Kazakh National University

21 May 2011

Hong Kong	53–8	Singapore

Hong Kong

4 September 2011

Belgium	7–15	Switzerland
	Report

Kituro Rugby Club, Schaerbeek, Brussels

29 October 2011

France	37–0	Italy

Stade des Arboras, Nice

5 November 2011

France	16–15	England

Stade Pierre-de-Coubertin, Châteaurenard

6 November 2011

Netherlands	10–33	Scotland

Amsterdam

26 November 2011

England	10–0	New Zealand

Twickenham, London

29 November 2011

England	21–7	New Zealand

Esher

3 December 2011

England	8–8	New Zealand

Esher

== 2012 ==
=== Tournaments ===
Test#	Dates	Event	Location
929-943	2012-02-03 to 2012-03-18	Women's Six Nations Championship	Various
944-945	2012-04-21 to 2012-04-28	Elgon Cup	Kampala and Nairobi
946–953, 955-956	2012-05-03 to 2012-05-20	FIRA European Championship	Enköping, Sweden and Rovereto, Italy
957-960	2012-06-14 to 2012-06-16	Asian Championship (II Division)	Manila, Philippines
961-964	2012-07-05 to 2012-07-07	Asian Four Nations	Kunshan, China

=== Other matches ===
19 May 2012

Japan	61–15	Hong Kong

Chichibunomiya Rugby Stadium, Tokyo

6 October 2012

Finland	5–15	Switzerland

Myllypuro Sports Park, Helsinki

3 November 2012

England	23–13	France

Esher

18 November 2012

Italy	20–34	United States

Centro Sportivo di Roma, Rome

21 November 2012

France	13–0	United States

Stade Marcel Garcin, Orléans

23 November 2012

England	16–13	New Zealand

Esher

24 November 2012

France	27–3	United States

Stade de France, Paris

27 November 2012

England	17–8	New Zealand

Aldershot Military Stadium

1 December 2012

England	32–23	New Zealand

Twickenham

3 December 2012

Italy	29–12	Spain

Centro di Preparazione Olimpica Roma

12 December 2012

Singapore	21–45	Hong Kong

Yio Chu Kang Stadium

15 December 2012

Singapore	17–44	Hong Kong

Yio Chu Kang Stadium

== 2013 ==
=== Tournaments ===
Test#	Dates	Event	Location
976-990	2013-02-02 to 2013-03-17	Women's Six Nations Championship	Various
992–997, 999-1001	2013-04-20 to 2013-04-27	FIRA World Cup Qualification Tournament	Madrid
1005-1006	2013-06-15 to 2013-06-22	Elgon Cup	Kampala and Nairobi
1011–1018	2013-07-30 to 2013-08-10	Nations Cup	Colorado
1019–1020, 1022-1023	2013-09-04 to 2013-09-07	ARFU Women's Rugby Championship	Almaty
1021	2013-09-07 to 2013-09-07	Africa World Cup Qualification	Almaty

=== Other matches ===
13 April 2013

Switzerland	5–25	Belgium

Centre Sportif de Colovray, Nyon

27 April 2013

Hong Kong	29–0	Singapore

Hong Kong

7 June 2013

United States	13–10	France

Oxnard College

11 June 2013

United States	25–27	France

Oxnard College

14 June 2013

United States	12–18	France

StubHub Center Campus, Carson, California

29 June 2013

Czech Republic	15–27	Switzerland

Tatra Smichov Stadium, Prague

13 July 2013

New Zealand	29–10	England

Eden Park, Auckland

16 July 2013

New Zealand	14–9	England

Waikato Stadium, Hamilton

20 July 2013

New Zealand	29–8	England

ECOlight Stadium, Pukekohe

19 October 2013

Namibia	31–10	Botswana

Windhoek, Namibia

2 November 2013

France	27–19	Canada

Pontarlier, France

5 November 2013

France	6–11	Canada

Amnéville, France

9 November 2013

England	40–20	France

Twickenham Stadium, London

13 November 2013

England	32–3	Canada

Twickenham Stoop, London

16 November 2013

Switzerland	42–0	Czech Republic

Nyon

== 2014 ==
=== Tournaments ===
Test#	Dates	Event	Location
1030–1039, 1041-1045	2014-01-31 to 2014-03-16	Women's Six Nations Championship	Various
1048–1053	2014-05-18 to 2014-05-24	2014 Asian Four Nations	Aberdeen Stadium, Hong Kong
1054	2014-06-01 to 2014-06-01	Laurie O'Reilly Cup	Sydney
1060, 1096–1099	2014-06-28 to 2014-11-02	European Trophy	Various
1063–1064	2014-07-12 to 2014-07-19	Elgon Cup	Kampala and Nairobi
1065–1094	2014-08-01 to 2014-08-17	2014 Women's Rugby World Cup	Marcoussis and Paris

=== Other matches ===
8 March 2014

Switzerland	80–0	Finland

Unterägeri

15 April 2014

Canada	51–7	United States

Shawnigan Lake School, British Columbia

19 April 2014

Canada	14–10	United States

Westhills Stadium, British Columbia

6 June 2014

Australia	0–22	Canada

Tauranga, New Zealand

7 June 2014

New Zealand	90–12	Samoa

Eden Park, Auckland, New Zealand

10 June 2014

New Zealand	16–8	Canada

Tauranga, New Zealand

14 June 2014

New Zealand	33–21	Canada

Whakatāne, New Zealand

28 June 2014

Wales	7–10	United States

Crosskeys

1 July 2014

Spain	3–37	France

Estadio Pepe Rojo, Valladolid

4 July 2014

France	46–8	South Africa

Marcoussis

18 October 2014

Sweden	3–10	Netherlands

Malmö

23 November 2014

Italy	27–3	Scotland

Avezzano

== 2015 ==
=== Tournaments ===
Test#	Dates	Event	Location
1102–1116	2015-02-06 to 2015-03-22	Women's Six Nations Championship	Various
1117–1119	2015-04-25 to 2015-05-23	Asia Rugby Championship	Various
1120–1121	2015-06-13 to 2015-06-20	Elgon Cup	Various
1122–1127	2015-06-27 to 2015-07-05	Women's Rugby Super Series	Various
1128–1131	2015-10-29 to 2015-11-01	2015 Women's European Trophy	Various

=== Other matches ===
31 January 2015

Ireland	31–12	Wales

Milltown House, Ashbourne RFC

7 November 2015

France	11–0	England

Stade Francis Turcan, Martigues

14 November 2015

England	8–3	Ireland

Twickenham Stoop, London

22 November 2015

Spain	10–34	Scotland

Estadio Pepe Rojo, Valladolid

19 December 2015

Spain	57–0	Hong Kong

Estadio Valle del Arcipreste, Majadahonda

== 2016 ==
=== Tournaments ===
Test#	Dates	Event	Location
1136–1150	2016-02-05 to 2016-03-20	Women's Six Nations Championship	Various
1151, 1153	2016-05-07 to 2016-05-28	Asia Rugby Championship	Various
1154–1159	2016-07-01 to 2016-07-09	Women's Rugby Super Series	Regional Athletic Complex, Salt Lake City, Utah
1161–1169	2016-10-06 to 2016-10-15	2016 Women's European Championship	Estadio Nacional Complutense, Madrid, Spain
1170-1171	2016-10-22 to 2016-10-26	2016 Laurie O'Reilly Cup	Eden Park and QBE Stadium, Auckland
1172	2016-11-05 to 2016-11-05	2016 Oceania Rugby Women's Championship, World Cup qualifier (Oceania)	Suva (Fiji)
1175, 1182	2016-11-18 to 2016-11-26	World Cup qualifier (Europe)	Glasgow and Madrid
1184–1186	2016-12-09 to 2016-12-17	Asia Pacific Championship World Cup qualifier (Repechage)	Hong Kong

=== Other matches ===
14 May 2016

Singapore	7–40	Hong Kong

Singapore

21 August 2016

Germany	36–0	Switzerland

Heidelberg

9 November 2016

England	10–5	France

Twickenham Stoop, London

13 November 2016

Ireland	10–12	England

UCD Bowl, Dublin, Ireland

19 November 2016

England	20–25	New Zealand

Twickenham Stoop, London

19 November 2016

Ireland	7–48	Canada

UCD Bowl, Dublin, Ireland

22 November 2016

France	36–10	United States

Béziers

23 November 2016

Canada	10–20	New Zealand

Donnybrook, Dublin, Ireland

25 November 2016

France	31–6	United States

Montpellier

26 November 2016

England	39–6	Canada

Twickenham Stoop, London

27 November 2016

Ireland	8–38	New Zealand

UCD Bowl, Dublin, Ireland

== 2017 ==
=== Tournaments ===
Test#	Dates	Event	Location
1187–1201	2017-02-03 to 2017-03-18	Women's Six Nations Championship	Various
1209	2017-06-13 to 2017-06-13	Laurie O'Reilly Cup	Sydney
1213-1214	2017-07-08 to 2017-07-15	2017 Asian Rugby Championship	Shiroyama and Hong Kong
1216–1245	2017-08-09 to 2017-08-26	2017 Women's Rugby World Cup	Dublin (Ireland)

=== Other matches ===
28 March 2017

United States	5–39	Canada

Chula Vista, California

1 April 2017

United States	10–37	Canada

Chula Vista, California

3 June 2017

Spain	41–18	Hong Kong

Estadio Municipal, Medina del Campo

9 June 2017

New Zealand	28–16	Canada

Westpac Stadium, Wellington

9 June 2017

Australia	10–53	England

Porirua Park, Wellington

11 June 2017

Wales	10–52	Japan

Ystrad Mynach

13 June 2017

Canada	20–27	England

Rugby Park, Christchurch

17 June 2017

Australia	5–45	Canada

Smallbone Park, Rotorua

17 June 2017

New Zealand	21–29	England

Rotorua International Stadium, Rotorua

8 July 2017

Wales	26–21	Spain

Cardiff

22 July 2017

Zimbabwe	10–5	Botswana

Hartsfield Rugby Grounds, Bulawayo

10 September 2017

Germany	29–0	Switzerland

Sportplatz Almmannsdorf, Konstanz

21 October 2017

Finland	10–39	Sweden

Eerikkilä Areena, Tammela

17 November 2017

England	79–5	Canada

Barnet Copthall, London

19 November 2017

Italy	21–41	France

Biella

21 November 2017

England	49–12	Canada

Twickenham Stoop

25 November 2017

England	69–19	Canada

Twickenham

== 2018 ==
=== Tournaments ===
Test#	Dates	Event	Location
1252–1260, 1265-1270	2018-02-02 to 2018-03-18	Women's Six Nations Championship	Various
1261–1264	2018-02-27 to 2018-03-03	European Championship	Waterloo
1271–1273	2018-06-02 to 2018-06-08	2018 Asian Rugby Championship	Singapore
1276-1277	2018-08-18 to 2018-08-25	2018 Laurie O'Reilly Cup	ANZ Stadium, Sydney and Eden Park, Auckland
1278, 1291	2018-10-13 to 2018-11-17	2018–19 European Trophy	Helsinki and Yverdon
1287–1288, 1294–1295, 1298-1299	2018-11-16 to 2018-11-24	2018 Oceania Rugby Women's Championship	Lautoka (Fiji)

=== Other matches ===
11 July 2018

Zambia	19–18	Zimbabwe

Mufulira

15 July 2018

Zambia	7–3	Zimbabwe

Mufulira

28 October 2018

Germany	25–0	Czech Republic

Berlin

3 November 2018

United States	6–67	New Zealand

Soldier Field, Chicago

4 November 2018

Italy	38–0	Scotland

Calvisano

9 November 2018

England	57–5	United States

Allianz Park, London

9 November 2018

France	0–14	New Zealand

Stade Mayol, Toulon

10 November 2018

Wales	19–5	South Africa

Cardiff Arms Park

11 November 2018

Spain	60–5	Hong Kong

Villajoyosa

16 November 2018

Wales	65–0	Hong Kong

Cardiff Arms Park

17 November 2018

France	30–27	New Zealand

Stade des Alpes, Grenoble

17 November 2018

Spain	17–5	South Africa

Villajoyosa

18 November 2018

England	27–19	Canada

Castle Park, Doncaster

18 November 2018

Ireland	10–19	United States

Donnybrook, Dublin

24 November 2018

Wales	21–38	Canada

Cardiff Arms Park

24 November 2018

England	37–15	Ireland

Twickenham

25 November 2018

Italy	35–10	South Africa

Prato

27 November 2018

Scotland	25–28	Canada

Scotstoun

== 2019 ==
=== Tournaments ===
Test#	Dates	Event	Location
1303–1308, 1310–1313, 1315–1316, 1318-1320	2019-02-01 to 2019-03-17	Women's Six Nations Championship	Various
1309, 1314, 1321–1322	2019-02-23 to 2019-05-04	European Championship	Various
1317	2019-03-16 to 2019-03–16	2018–19 European Trophy	Prague
1323–1325	2019-05-24 to 2019-06-01	2019 Asia Pacific Championship	Suva, Fiji
1326–1327, 1329-1330	2019-06-19 to 2019-06-22	2019 Asian Division I Championship	Calamba, Philippines
1328, 1341	2019-06-22 to 2019-07-13	Elgon Cup	Kisumu and Kampala
1331–1338, 1342–1343	2019-06-28 to 2019-07-14	Women's Rugby Super Series	San Diego, California
1345-1346	2019-07-31 to 2019-08-03	Asian Championship qualifiers	Jiujiang Stadium, China
1347–1348, 1350–1351, 1353–1354	2019-08-09 to 2019-08-17	2019 Rugby Africa Cup World Cup qualifier (Africa)	Johannesburg
1349, 1352	2019-08-10 to 2019-08-17	2019 Laurie O'Reilly Cup	Optus Stadium, Perth and Eden Park, Auckland
1360–1361, 1364, 1368, 1374	2019-10-12 to 2019-11–23	2019–20 European Trophy	Various
1370, 1372, 1379	2019-11-18 to 2019-11-30	2019 Oceania Rugby Women's Championship World Cup qualifier (Oceania)	Lautoka, Fiji

=== Other matches ===
20 January 2019

Spain	29–24	Scotland

Madrid

13 July 2019

Australia	34–5	Japan

Sportsground 2, Newcastle

13 July 2019

Zimbabwe	18–19	Zambia

Harare Sports Club

19 July 2019

Australia	46–3	Japan

North Sydney Oval, Sydney

25 August 2019

Colombia	28–7	Brazil

Medellín

14 September 2019

Zambia	21–15	Zimbabwe

Dean Arena, Lusaka

21 September 2019

South Africa	12–29	Spain

WJ De Wet Stadium, Despatch

30 September 2019

South Africa	5–47	Scotland

City Park, Cape Town

5 October 2019

South Africa	15–38	Scotland

City Park, Cape Town

3 November 2019

Spain	22–5	Wales

Estadio Nacional Universidad Complutense, Madrid

9 November 2019

France	10–20	England

Stade Marcel-Michelin, Clermont Ferrand

10 November 2019

Ireland	13–15	Wales

Donnybrook, Dublin

16 November 2019

England	17–15	France

Sandy Park, Exeter

16 November 2019

Italy	17–17	Japan

Stadio Fattori, L'Aquila

17 November 2019

Scotland	3–17	Wales

Scotstoun, Glasgow

20 November 2019

United States	0–19	Canada

Chula Vista, San Diego

23 November 2019

England	60–3	Italy

Goldington Road, Bedford

24 November 2019

Scotland	20–24	Japan

Scotstoun

24 November 2019

United States	27–52	Canada

Chula Vista, San Diego

26 November 2019

Netherlands	12–14	Hong Kong

Amsterdam

30 November 2019

Netherlands	0–18	Hong Kong

Amsterdam

== 2020 ==
=== Tournaments ===
Test#	Dates	Event	Location
1381–1388, 1391, 1393-1395	2020-02-02 to 2020-11-01	Women's Six Nations Championship	Various
1389, 1397	2020-03-01 to 2020-11-14	2019 Oceania Championship World Cup qualifier (Oceania)	The Trusts Arena, Auckland
1390	2020-03-07 to 2020-03-07	European Championship	Various
1392	2020-03-09 to 2020-03-09	World Cup qualifier (Americas)	Various

=== Other matches ===
20 January 2020

Spain	12–36	Scotland

Estadio Juan Rojas, Almería

14 November 2020

France	10–33	England

Stade des Alpes, Grenoble

21 November 2020

England	25–23	France

Twickenham

== 2021 ==
=== Tournaments ===
Test#	Dates	Event	Location
1399-1400	2021-03-20 to 2021-03-27	European Championship	Various
1401–1409	2021-04-03 to 2021-04-24	Women's Six Nations Championship	Various
1411–1416, 1426–1427, 1429, 1442	2021-06-09 to 2021-11-13	2021 Rugby Africa Cup	Various
1419	2021-08-25 to 2021-08-25	South America/Africa play-off World Cup qualifier (South America/Africa)	Nyayo National Stadium, Nairobi
1420–1425	2021-09-13 to 2021-09-25	RE World Cup Qualification Tournament World Cup qualifier (Europe)	Stadio Sergio Lanfranchi, Parma
1428, 1430, 1435, 1441, 1449	2021-10-16 to 2021-12-04	2021–22 European Trophy	Various
1432–1433	2021-11-01 to 2021-11-05	Pacific Four Series	Infinity Park, Glendale, Colorado

=== Other matches ===
30 April 2021

France	15–17 (Note: Play was abandoned after 62 minutes due to floodlight failure. As a result of playing over 60 minutes, England were awarded the win.)	England

Stadium Lille Métropole, Villeneuve-d'Ascq

12 August 2021

South Africa	66–0	Kenya

Danie Craven Stadium, Stellenbosch

16 August 2021

South Africa	29–22	Kenya

Danie Craven Stadium, Stellenbosch

31 October 2021

England	43–12	New Zealand

Sandy Park, Exeter

6 November 2021

France	46–3	South Africa

Stade de la Rabine, Vannes

7 November 2021

England	56–15	New Zealand

Franklin's Gardens, Northampton

7 November 2021

Wales	23–5	Japan

Cardiff Arms Park

12 November 2021

Ireland	20–10	United States

RDS Arena, Dublin

13 November 2021

France	38–13	New Zealand

Stade du Hameau, Pau

13 November 2021

Wales	29–19	South Africa

Cardiff Arms Park

14 November 2021

England	51–12	Canada

Twickenham Stoop

14 November 2021

Scotland	36–12	Japan

Edinburgh Rugby Stadium

20 November 2021

France	29–7	New Zealand

Stade Pierre-Fabre, Castres

20 November 2021

Ireland	15–12	Japan

RDS Arena, Dublin

21 November 2021

England	89–0	United States

Sixways Stadium, Worcester

21 November 2021

Wales	7–24	Canada

Cardiff Arms Park

== 2022 ==
=== Tournaments ===
Test#	Dates	Event	Location
1450, 1452	19–25 February 2022	World Cup qualifier (Final Qualification Tournament)	The Sevens Stadium, Dubai
1451, 1453	19–26 February 2022	Rugby Europe Women's Championship	Various
1454, 1467, 1474	12 March – 28 May 2022	2021–22 Rugby Europe Women's Trophy	Various
1455–1466, 1468–1470	26 March – 30 April 2022	Women's Six Nations Championship	Various
1475–1478, 1481–1482	6–18 June 2022	Pacific Four Series	Tauranga, Auckland and Whangārei
1479, 1483–1484, 1514, 1521, 1527, 1531, 1534, 1537–1538, 1542, 1545	15 June – 12 November 2022	Rugby Africa Cup	City Park, Cape Town
1485–1490	9–18 July 2022	Oceania Rugby Women's Championship	Auckland
1497, 1501	20–27 August 2022	Laurie O'Reilly Cup	Christchurch and Adelaide
1508–1513, 1515–1520, 1522–1524, 1528–1530, 1532–1533, 1535–1536, 1539–1540, 1543–1544	8 October – 12 November 2022	2021 Rugby World Cup	Auckland and Whangārei
1525–1526, 1541, 1547	22 October – 19 November 2022	2022–23 Rugby Europe Women's Trophy	Various

=== Other matches ===
1 May 2022

Fiji	14–28	Japan

Bond University, Gold Coast, Australia

6 May 2022

Australia	36–19	Fiji

Suncorp Stadium, Brisbane

10 May 2022

Australia	10–12	Japan

Bond University, Gold Coast

18 June 2022

Netherlands	57–5	Belgium

Utrecht

24 July 2022

Japan	15–6	South Africa

Kamaishi Recovery Memorial Stadium, Kamaishi, Iwate

24 July 2022

Canada	34–24	Italy

Starlight Stadium, Langford

30 July 2022

Japan	10–20	South Africa

Kumagaya Rugby Stadium, Saitama

13 August 2022

South Africa	44–5	Spain

Ellis Park, Johannesburg

19 August 2022

South Africa	37–14	Spain

Fanie du Toit Stadium, Potchefstroom

20 August 2022

Japan	22–57	Ireland

Shizuoka Stadium, Ecopa

27 August 2022

Scotland	17–21	United States

DAM Health Stadium, Edinburgh

27 August 2022

Japan	29–10	Ireland

Chichibunomiya Rugby Stadium, Tokyo

27 August 2022

Canada	31–3	Wales

Wanderers Grounds, Halifax

3 September 2022

France	21–0	Italy

Nice

3 September 2022

England	52–14	United States

Sandy Park, Exeter

9 September 2022

Italy	26–19	France

Stadio Sergio Lanfranchi, Parma

14 September 2022

England	73–7	Wales

Ashton Gate, Bristol

23 September 2022

Fiji	7–24	Canada

HFC Bank Stadium, Suva

24 September 2022

New Zealand	95–12	Japan

Eden Park, Auckland

12 November 2022

Brazil	17–25	Colombia

Estádio Nogueirão, Mogi das Cruzes

26 November 2022

Portugal	5–7	Sweden

CAR Rugby do Jamor, Oeiras

== 2023 ==
=== Tournaments ===
Dates	Event	Location
22 October 2022 – 18 March 2023	2022–23 Rugby Europe Women's Trophy	Various
11–25 February 2023	Rugby Europe Women's Championship	Various
25 March–29 April 2023	Women's Six Nations Championship	Various
1 April–14 July 2023	Pacific Four Series	Madrid, Brisbane and Ottawa
20–28 May 2023	Rugby Africa Women's Cup	Stade Makis, Antananarivo
23–28 May 2023	Asia Rugby Women's Championship	Astana
26 May–4 June 2023	Oceania Rugby Women's Championship	Gold Coast
12–16 July 2023	Americas North Championship	Kingston
22 July 2023	WXV European play-off	Piacenza
30 September 2023	Laurie O'Reilly Cup	Hamilton
14 October–4 November 2023	WXV	Various
11 November 2023	Elgon Cup	Kisumu

=== Other matches ===
25 March 2023

Spain	14–20	United States

Estadio Nacional Complutense, Madrid

25 March 2023

Canada	66–7	South Africa

Estadio Nacional Complutense, Madrid, Spain

1 April 2023

Spain	20–35	South Africa

Estadio Nacional Complutense, Madrid

1 May 2023

Sweden	17–22	Hong Kong

National Rugby Center, Amsterdam

6 May 2023

Netherlands	19–17	Hong Kong

National Rugby Center, Amsterdam

20 May 2023

Australia	22–5	Fiji

Allianz Stadium, Sydney

11 June 2023

Brazil	15–18	Colombia

Estádio Presidente Eurico Gaspar Dutra, Cuiabá

5 July 2023

Colombia	24–23	Brazil

Estadio Cincuentenario, Antioquia

9 July 2023

Colombia	30–19	Brazil

Estadio Cincuentenario, Antioquia

15 July 2023

Spain	19–27	Japan

Estadio Pedro Escartín, Guadalajara

10 September 2023

Japan	29–24	Fiji

Japan Base, Fukuoka

16 September 2023

Japan	41–36	Fiji

Chichibunomiya Rugby Stadium, Tokyo

16 September 2023

South Africa	77–12	Kenya

University of the Western Cape Stadium, Cape Town

23 September 2023

England	50–24	Canada

Sandy Park, Exeter

30 September 2023

England	29–12	Canada

Barnet Copthall, London

30 September 2023

Scotland	36–5	Spain

Edinburgh Rugby Stadium

30 September 2023

Italy	24–25	Japan

Stadio Sergio Lanfranchi, Parma

30 September 2023

Wales	38–18	United States

Stadiwm CSM, Colwyn Bay

7 October 2023

South Africa	17–17	Samoa

Boland Stadium, Wellington

7 October 2023

Hong Kong	31–28	Colombia

The Sevens Stadium, Dubai

21 October 2023

Finland	41–7	Latvia

Myllypuro Sports Park, Helsinki

21 November 2023

Brazil	10–7	Portugal

SESI Guarulhos, São Paulo

22 November 2023

Tunisia	26–17	Uganda

Stade El Menzah, Tunis

25 November 2023

Brazil	5–13	Portugal

SESI Guarulhos, São Paulo

27 November 2023

Tunisia	53–13	Uganda

Stade El Menzah, Tunis

2 December 2023

Croatia	37–5	Bulgaria

Sinj

== 2024 ==
=== Tournaments ===
Dates	Event	Location
3 February–12 April 2024	Rugby Europe Women's Championship	Various
16 March 2024	WXV relegation play-off	NRCA Stadium, Amsterdam
23 March–27 April 2024	Women's Six Nations Championship	Various
27 April–25 May 2024	Pacific Four Series	Various
4–12 May 2024	Rugby Africa Women's Cup	Stade Makis, Antananarivo
22 May–1 June 2024	Asia Rugby Women's Championship	Hong Kong
24 May–2 June 2024	Oceania Rugby Women's Championship	Sunnybank Rugby Club, Brisbane
25 May–14 July 2024	O'Reilly Cup	Various
29 June 2024	2025 World Cup South America Qualifier	Various
10–14 July 2024	Americas North Championship	FC Total, Querétaro
22 September 2024–10 May 2025	Rugby Europe Conference	Various
27 September–13 October 2024	WXV	Various
19 October 2024–5 April 2025	Rugby Europe Trophy	Various

=== Other matches ===
23 March 2024

Spain	13–15	South Africa

Estadio Pepe Rojo, Valladolid

30 March 2024

United States	38–17	South Africa

Trailfinders Sports Ground, London, England

5 April 2024

Andorra	119–0	Bulgaria

Andorra la Vella

14 June 2024

Fiji	15–24	Japan

HFC Bank Stadium, Suva

15 June 2024

Colombia	96–0	Trinidad and Tobago

Estadio Cincuentenario, Medellín

20 June 2024

Fiji	24–15	Japan

Churchill Park, Lautoka

6 July 2024

Australia	64–5	Fiji

Allianz Stadium

11 August 2024

Japan	17–17	United States

Mikuni World Stadium, Kitakyushu

17 August 2024

Japan	8–11	United States

Shizuoka Stadium ECOPA, Fukuroi

6 September 2024

Scotland	40–14	Wales

Hive Stadium, Edinburgh

7 September 2024

England	38–19	France

Kingsholm Stadium, Gloucester

14 September 2024

Italy	24–8	Japan

Stadio Walter Beltrametti, Piacenza

14 September 2024

Scotland	59–15	Fiji

Hive Stadium, Edinburgh

14 September 2024

Ireland	36–10	Australia

Kingspan Stadium, Belfast

14 September 2024

England	24–12	New Zealand

Twickenham Stadium, London

19 September 2024

South Africa	36–19	Spain

DHL Stadium, Cape Town

19 September 2024

Netherlands	12–10	Fiji

National Rugby Center, Amsterdam

20 September 2024

Kenya	63–19	Madagascar

RFUEA Ground, Nairobi

20 September 2024

Wales	31–24	Australia

Rodney Parade, Newport

26 October 2024

Latvia	0–63	Finland

Zemgales Olimpiskais Centrs, Jelgava

28 November 2024

Netherlands	15–7	Brazil

National Rugby Center, Amsterdam

4 December 2024

Netherlands	17–15	Brazil

National Rugby Center, Amsterdam

7 December 2024

Mexico	46–19	Jamaica

Estadio Alfredo Harp Helú, Mexico City

== 2025 ==
=== Tournaments ===
Dates	Event	Location
19 October 2024–5 April 2025	2024–25 Rugby Europe Trophy	Various
22 March–26 April 2025	Six Nations Championship	Various
29 March–19 April 2025	Rugby Europe Championship	Various
11 April–19 April 2025	Rugby Africa Division 1	San-Pédro
15 May–25 May 2025	Asia Rugby Women's Championship	Fukuoka
22 September 2024–10 May 2025	Rugby Europe Conference	Various
10 May–24 May 2025	Pacific Four Series	Various
10 May–12 July 2025	O'Reilly Cup	Various
6 June–14 June 2025	Oceania Rugby Championship	Sigatoka
7 June–15 June 2025	Rugby Africa Cup	Stade Makis, Antananarivo
22 August 2025-27 September 2025	2025 World Cup	England
25 October 2025–4 April 2026	2025–26 Rugby Europe Trophy	Various
22 November 2025–TBD	2025–26 Rugby Europe Conference	Various

=== Other matches ===
16 March 2025

Portugal	12–19	Brazil

Complexo Desportivo Municipal, Caldas da Rainha

22 March 2025

Spain	41–12	Brazil

Estadio Nelson Mandela, Torrevieja

19 April 2025

Spain	26–48	South Africa

Bonalba Resort, Mutxamel

26 April 2025

United States	33–39	Japan

Wallis Annenberg Stadium, Los Angeles

3 May 2025

Fiji	7–43	Australia

HFC Bank Stadium, Suva

24 May 2025

Jamaica	19–39	Mexico

Bramwell Clarke Sports Complex, Ewarton

31 May 2025

Jamaica	71–7	Trinidad and Tobago

Bramwell Clarke Sports Complex, Ewarton

14 June 2025

Brazil	58–7	Colombia

Estádio Nicolau Alayon, São Paulo

28 June 2025

Trinidad and Tobago	18–16	Mexico

Larry Gomes Stadium, Port of Spain

5 July 2025

South Africa	20–50	Canada

Loftus Versfeld Stadium, Pretoria

12 July 2025

Brazil	5–33	Netherlands

Estádio Municipal Du Cambusano, Jacareí

12 July 2025

South Africa	5–33	Canada

Nelson Mandela Bay Stadium, Port Elizabeth

19 July 2025

Japan	32–19	Spain

Mikuni World Stadium, Kitakyushu

19 July 2025

Brazil	22–0	Netherlands

Estádio Nicolau Alayon, São Paulo

19 July 2025

United States	31–24	Fiji

Audi Field, Washington, D.C.

25 July 2025

Italy	34–29	Scotland

Stadio Luigi Zaffanella, Viadana

26 July 2025

Australia	12–21	Wales

Ballymore Stadium, Brisbane

26 July 2025

Japan	30–19	Spain

Chichibunomiya Rugby Stadium, Tokyo

1 August 2025

Australia	36–5	Wales

North Sydney Oval, Sydney

1 August 2025

Canada	42–10	United States

TD Place Stadium, Ottawa

2 August 2025

Ireland	27–21	Scotland

Musgrave Park, Cork

2 August 2025

England	97–7	Spain

Mattioli Woods Welford Road, Leicester

9 August 2025

Ireland	26–47	Canada

Ravenhill Stadium, Belfast

9 August 2025

France	6–40	England

Stade André et Guy Boniface, Mont-de-Marsan

9 August 2025

Italy	33–15	Japan

Stadio San Michele, Calvisano

20 September 2025

Latvia	15–15	Denmark

Riga Technical College Rugby Field, Riga

26 October 2025

Peru	0–54	Chile

Complejo Deportivo Andrés Avelino Cáceres, Lima

1 November 2025

Denmark	39–7	Norway

CSR/Nanok Rugby Club, Copenhagen

8 November 2025

Colombia	65–5	Mexico

Estadio Cincuentenario, Medellín

== 2026 ==
=== Tournaments ===
Dates	Event	Location
25 October 2025–4 April 2026	2025–26 Rugby Europe Trophy	Various
22 November 2025–TBD	2025–26 Rugby Europe Conference	Various
8 February–14 February 2026	SEARF Championship	Padang Astaka, Petaling Jaya
28 March–18 April 2026	Rugby Europe Championship	Various
11 April–25 April 2026	Pacific Four Series	Various
11 April–17 May 2026	Six Nations Championship	Various
17 April–25 April 2026	Oceania Rugby Championship	Lautoka and Ba
28 April–9 May 2026	Asia Rugby Championship	Kazakhstan
23 May–31 May 2026	Rugby Africa Cup	RFUEA Ground, Nairobi
25 April–22 August 2026	O'Reilly Cup	Various
September–22 August 2026	WXV	Various

=== Other matches ===
27 March 2026

Australia	33–15	Fiji

GIO Stadium Canberra, Canberra

4 July 2026

South Africa	43–21	United States

Ellis Park, Johannesburg

11 July 2026

South Africa	19–26	United States

Loftus Versfeld, Pretoria

5 September 2026

South Africa	v	New Zealand

FNB Stadium, Soweto

10 October 2026

Australia	v	Scotland

17 October 2026

Australia	v	Scotland

17 October 2026

New Zealand	v	France

FMG Stadium Waikato, Hamilton

24 October 2026

New Zealand	v	France

Semenoff Stadium, Whangārei

31 October 2026

New Zealand	v	France

One New Zealand Stadium, Christchurch

== See also ==
- Rugby 2021 - Women's Test Series at the-sports.org
- Rugby 2022 - Women's Test Series at the-sports.org
- Rugby 2023 - Women's Test Series at the-sports.org
- Rugby 2024 - Women's Test Series at the-sports.org
