= List of Netherlands women's national rugby union team matches =

The following is a list of Netherlands women's national rugby union team international matches.

== Overall ==
The Netherlands overall international match record against all nations, updated to 19 July 2025, is as follows:

	Games Played	Won	Drawn	Lost	Percentage of wins
Total	147	76	1	70	51.7%

== Full internationals ==
=== Legend ===
Won	Lost	Draw

=== 1980s ===
Test	Date	Opponent	PF	PA	Venue	Event
1	1982-06-13	France	0	4	Utrecht, Netherlands	First women's rugby union test match.
2	1983-06-05	France	0	10	La Teste	
3	1984-05-27	France	0	3	Hilversum	
4	1984-10-21	Sweden	34	0	Malmö	
5	1985-06-02	France	0	20	Bourg-en-Bresse, France	
6	1985-10-19	Sweden	19	0	Nijmegen	
7	1986-05-01	France	10	0	Enschede	
8	1986-10-17	Sweden	11	6	Castricum	
9	1987-05-31	France	3	22	Chalon-sur-Saône, France	
10	1987-11-22	Great Britain	0	16	Richmond	
11	1988-05-21	France	3	13	Bourg-en-Bresse, France	1988 Women's Rugby European Cup
12	1988-05-22	Great Britain	0	26	Bourg-en-Bresse, France	1988 Women's Rugby European Cup
13	1988-05-23	Italy	10	6	Bourg-en-Bresse, France	1988 Women's Rugby European Cup
14	1988-11-27	Wales	3	0	Utrecht, Netherlands	
15	1989-04-20	Italy	14	26	Rome	

=== 1990s ===
Test	Date	Opponent	PF	PA	Venue	Event
16	1990-04-14	France	0	10	Castricum	
17	1990-08-26	New Zealand	0	56	Christchurch	RugbyFest 1990
18	1990-08-29	United States	0	38	Christchurch	RugbyFest 1990
19	1990-08-30	Soviet Union	12	4	Christchurch	RugbyFest 1990
20	1990-10-21	England	0	26	Utrecht	
21	1991-04-06	United States	0	7	Pontypool	1991 Women's Rugby World Cup
22	1991-04-08	Soviet Union	28	0	Llanharan	1991 Women's Rugby World Cup
23	1991-04-11	Wales	6	3	Cardiff	1991 Women's Rugby World Cup
24	1991-04-12	Spain	8	0	Cardiff	1991 Women's Rugby World Cup
25	1992-10-17	Germany	39	0	Hanover	
26	1992-11-15	France	0	24	Fécamp	
27	1993-03-13	Italy	5	8	Stadio Comunale, Rho	
28	1993-10-10	Germany	53	0	Delft	
29	1994-12-18	England	5	30	Wasps RFC	
30	1995-04-12	France	0	17	Trévise	1995 FIRA Championship
31	1995-04-16	Italy	19	23	Trévise	1995 FIRA Championship
32	1995-09-23	Scotland	5	3	Amsterdam	
33	1996-04-09	Spain	0	29	Madrid	1996 FIRA Championship
34	1996-04-11	Germany	29	11	Madrid	1996 FIRA Championship
35	1996-04-12	Italy	6	11	Madrid	1996 FIRA Championship
36	1996-11-30	Scotland	3	27	Meggetland	
37	1997-04-02	England	3	40	Nice, France	1997 FIRA Championship
38	1997-04-04	Germany	32	10	Nice, France	1997 FIRA Championship
39	1997-04-06	Italy	26	24	Nice, France	1997 FIRA Championship
40	1997-10-26	Germany	31	7	Amsterdam	
41	1998-02-15	Spain	5	29	Amsterdam	
42	1998-05-01	Canada	7	16	Amsterdam	1998 Women's Rugby World Cup
43	1998-05-05	Sweden	44	0	Amsterdam	1998 Women's Rugby World Cup
44	1998-05-09	Ireland	18	21	Amsterdam	1998 Women's Rugby World Cup
45	1998-05-12	Russia	61	0	Amsterdam	1998 Women's Rugby World Cup
46	1998-05-15	Germany	67	3	Amsterdam	1998 Women's Rugby World Cup
47	1999-04-09	Germany	19	12	Hanover	
48	1999-04-19	England	3	91	Belluno, Italy	1999 FIRA Championship
49	1999-04-21	Kazakhstan	0	24	Belluno, Italy	1999 FIRA Championship
50	1999-04-24	Italy	18	50	Belluno, Italy	1999 FIRA Championship

=== 2000s ===
Test	Date	Opponent	PF	PA	Venue	Event
51	2000-02-20	Belgium	54	7	Amsterdam, Netherlands	
52	2000-05-08	Germany	12	5	El Ejido, Spain	2000 FIRA Championship
53	2000-05-10	Germany	7	0	Roquetas, Spain	2000 FIRA Championship
54	2000-05-15	Ireland	12	19	El Ejido, Spain	2000 FIRA Championship
55	2001-01-15	Wales	5	72	Bridgend	
56	2001-04-08	Belgium	105	0	Amsterdam, Netherlands	
57	2001-05-07	Belgium	66	0	IC Lille, France	2001 FIRA Championship
58	2001-05-09	Germany	17	6	Lille, France	2001 FIRA Championship
59	2001-05-12	Sweden	12	13	Lille, France	2001 FIRA Championship
60	2001-10-24	Ireland	0	15	Amsterdam	
61	2002-03-20	Sweden	0	22	Treviso, Italy	2002 FIRA Nations Cup
62	2002-03-23	Germany	10	12	Treviso, Italy	2002 FIRA Nations Cup
63	2002-05-13	United States	0	87	Barcelona	2002 Women's Rugby World Cup
64	2002-05-17	Kazakhstan	10	37	Barcelona	2002 Women's Rugby World Cup
65	2002-05-20	Japan	3	37	Barcelona	2002 Women's Rugby World Cup
66	2002-05-24	Germany	20	19	Barcelona	2002 Women's Rugby World Cup
67	2003-05-08	Denmark	113	0	Amsterdam, Netherlands	2003 FIRA Championship
68	2003-05-11	Germany	19	12	Amsterdam, Netherlands	2003 FIRA Championship
69	2004-05-02	Denmark	141	3	Toulouse, France	2004 FIRA Championship
70	2004-05-05	Norway	78	0	Toulouse, France	2004 FIRA Championship
71	2004-05-08	Germany	30	0	Toulouse, France	2004 FIRA Championship
72	2004-11-06	Japan	15	7	Amsterdam, Netherlands	
73	2005-04-07	Sweden	8	7	Hamburg, Germany	2005 FIRA Championship
74	2005-04-09	Italy	3	22	Hamburg, Germany	2005 FIRA Championship
75	2006-03-25	Belgium	7	15	Brussels	
76	2006-04-23	Norway	84	0	San Dona Di Piave, Italy	2006 FIRA Nations Cup
77	2006-04-23	Sweden	10	5	San Dona Di Piave, Italy	2006 FIRA Nations Cup
78	2006-04-26	Russia	53	5	San Dona Di Piave, Italy	2006 FIRA Nations Cup
79	2006-04-30	Italy	7	28	San Dona Di Piave, Italy	2006 FIRA Nations Cup
80	2006-06-17	South Africa	0	35	Port Elizabeth, South Africa	
81	2006-06-24	South Africa	12	42	Durban, South Africa	
82	2006-12-03	Wales	0	24	Llanrumney, Wales	
83	2007-04-01	Belgium	62	5	Eindhoven, Netherlands	
84	2007-04-28	Wales	12	3	Barcelona, Spain	2007 FIRA Championship
85	2007-04-30	France	8	27	Barcelona, Spain	2007 FIRA Championship
86	2007-05-02	Sweden	20	5	Barcelona, Spain	2007 FIRA Championship
87	2007-05-05	Spain	0	37	Barcelona, Spain	2007 FIRA Championship
88	2007-12-01	Belgium	19	7	Ghent, Belgium	
89	2008-03-16	Germany	43	0	Aachen, Germany	
90	2008-04-20	Germany	50	10	Valkenswaard, Netherlands	
91	2008-05-10	Brazil	10	0	Amsterdam, Netherlands	
92	2008-05-17	France	3	24	Amsterdam, Netherlands	2008 FIRA Championship
93	2008-05-20	Scotland	0	26	Leiden, Netherlands	2008 FIRA Championship
94	2008-05-24	Sweden	7	6	Amsterdam, Netherlands	2008 FIRA Championship
95	2009-04-25	Sweden	24	0	Norrköping, Sweden	
96	2009-04-26	Sweden	7	3	Norrköping, Sweden	
97	2009-05-17	Belgium	100	0	Enköping, Sweden	2009 FIRA Trophy
98	2009-05-20	Russia	34	0	Stockholm, Sweden	2009 FIRA Trophy
99	2009-05-23	Scotland	18	38	Enköping, Sweden	2009 FIRA Trophy

=== 2010s ===
Test	Date	Opponent	PF	PA	Venue	Event
100	2010-04-02	Sweden	19	0	Leiden, Netherlands	
101	2010-04-04	Sweden	20	7	Amsterdam, Netherlands	
102	2010-04-18	Germany	83	0	Maastricht, Netherlands	
103	2010-05-08	Spain	12	26	Longwy, France	2010 FIRA Trophy
104	2010-05-10	Belgium	75	0	Verdun, France	2010 FIRA Trophy
105	2010-05-15	Sweden	47	19	Illkirch-Graffenstaden, France	2010 FIRA Trophy
106	2011-04-30	Russia	10	17	INEF Bastiaqueiro, Spain	2011 FIRA Trophy
107	2011-05-07	Sweden	21	5	INEF Bastiaqueiro, Spain	2011 FIRA Trophy
108	2011-11-06	Scotland	10	33	Amsterdam, Netherlands	
109	2012-05-03	Finland	105	0	Enköping, Sweden	2012 FIRA Championship
110	2012-05-07	Sweden	3	10	Enköping, Sweden	2012 FIRA Championship
111	2013-04-20	Scotland	7	29	Madrid, Spain	2014 RWC Qualifier
112	2013-04-23	Spain	0	78	Madrid, Spain	2014 RWC Qualifier
113	2013-04-27	Samoa	14	33	Madrid, Spain	2014 RWC Qualifier
114	2014-10-18	Sweden	10	3	Malmö, Sweden	
115	2014-10-30	Switzerland	39	0	Brussels, Belgium	2014 Rugby Europe Trophy
116	2014-11-02	Belgium	12	3	Brussels, Belgium	2014 Rugby Europe Trophy
117	2016-10-06	Switzerland	55	0	Estadio Nacional Complutense, Madrid	2016 REC (RWCQ)
118	2016-10-09	Russia	22	17	Estadio Nacional Complutense, Madrid	2016 REC (RWCQ)
119	2016-10-15	Spain	7	35	Ciudad Universitaria, Madrid, Spain	2016 REC (RWCQ)
120	2018-02-27	Belgium	84	12	Waterloo, Belgium	2018 REC
121	2018-03-03	Spain	7	40	Waterloo, Belgium	2018 REC
122	2019-03-09	Germany	46	17	Amsterdam, Netherlands	2019 REC
123	2019-03-30	Spain	0	54	Madrid, Spain	2019 REC
124	2019-11-26	Hong Kong	12	14	Amsterdam, Netherlands	
125	2019-11-30	Hong Kong	0	18	Amsterdam, Netherlands	

=== 2020–2023 ===
Test	Date	Opponent	PF	PA	Venue	Event
126	2020-03-07	Russia	21	27	Amsterdam	2020 REC
127	2021-03-27	Spain	0	87	Estadio Pedro Escartín, Guadalajara, Spain	2020 REC
128	2022-02-20	Spain	0	69	National Rugby Centre Amsterdam	2022 REC
129	2022-06-18	Belgium	57	5	Utrecht, Netherlands	
130	2023-02-11	Sweden	38	12	National Rugby Centre Amsterdam	2023 REC
131	2023-02-19	Spain	0	70	Poliesportiu de Pins Vens, Sitges, Spain	2023 REC
132	2023-05-06	Hong Kong	19	17	National Rugby Center, Amsterdam	

=== 2024 ===
Test	Date	Opponent	PF	PA	Venue	Event
133	2024-02-03	Sweden	59	0	National Rugby Center, Amsterdam	2024 REC
134	2024-02-24	Portugal	31	7	CAR Jamor	2024 REC
135	2024-03-16	Colombia	33	11	National Rugby Center, Amsterdam	WXV relegation play-off
136	2024-04-06	Spain	5	22	National Rugby Center, Amsterdam	2024 REC
137	2024-09-19	Fiji	12	10	National Rugby Center, Amsterdam	Test
138	2024-09-28	Samoa	8	8	The Sevens Stadium, Dubai	2024 WXV 3
139	2024-10-05	Spain	0	20	The Sevens Stadium, Dubai	2024 WXV 3
140	2024-10-12	Hong Kong China	33	3	The Sevens Stadium, Dubai	2024 WXV 3
141	2024-11-29	Brazil	15	7	National Rugby Center, Amsterdam	Test
142	2024-12-05	Brazil	17	15	National Rugby Center, Amsterdam	Test

=== 2025 ===
Test	Date	Opponent	PF	PA	Venue	Event
143	2025-04-06	Portugal	40	5	National Rugby Center, Amsterdam	2025 REC
144	2025-04-12	Spain	17	27	Campo del Pantano, Villajoyosa	2025 REC
145	2025-04-19	Sweden	90	3	Trelleborg Rugby Arena, Trelleborg	2025 REC
146	2025-07-12	Brazil	33	5	Estádio Municipal Du Cambusano, Jacareí	Test match
147	2025-07-19	Brazil	0	22	Estádio Nicolau Alayon, São Paulo	Test match

=== 2026 ===
Test	Date	Opponent	PF	PA	Venue	Event
148	2026-03-29	Portugal	TBD	TBD	National Rugby Center, Amsterdam	2026 REC
149	2026-04-11	Belgium	TBD	TBD	Sportcomplex Sint-Gillis, Dendermonde	2026 REC
150	2026-04-18	Spain	TBD	TBD	National Rugby Center, Amsterdam	2026 REC

== Other internationals ==
Date	Netherlands	PF	PA	Opponent	Venue	Tournament
2000-05-08	Netherlands	0	5	(Flanders) Flandre	El Ejido, Spain	2000 FIRA
2000-05-10	Netherlands	3	5	(Flanders) Flandre	El Ejido, Spain	2000 FIRA
2001-03-18	Netherlands	0	39	France A		
2002-02-16	Netherlands	5	53	France A	Amsterdam	
2002-03-02	Netherlands	0	5	England Academy	Staines	
2003-02-22	Netherlands	5	46	France A		
2003-03-29	Netherlands	15	14	England Development	Amsterdam	
2004-02-06	Netherlands B	56	0	Belgium	Ghent	
2004-02-22	Netherlands	5	15	England Development	Newbury	
2005-02-06	Netherlands	19	36	England Academy	Amsterdam	
2005-02-16	Netherlands Development	0	5	Belgium	Visé	
2005-02-26	Netherlands	17	12	France A	Amsterdam	
2005-03-05	Netherlands	22	7	(United Kingdom) Combined Services	Portsmouth	
2005-11-15	Netherlands	28	15	(United Kingdom) Combined Services	Newbury	
2006-02-11	Netherlands	27	0	Wales A	Amsterdam	
2006-02-26	Netherlands	13	0	England Students	RAF Halton	
2006-03-18	Netherlands	7	47	France A	Metz	
2006-03-25	Netherlands B	0	13	Belgium	Brussels	
2007-02-11	Netherlands	5	29	France A	Purmerend	
2008-02-10	Netherlands	7	37	France A	St Gratien	
2009-02-28	Netherlands	0	42	France A	Amsterdam	
2009-04-18	Netherlands	24	10	Catalonia	RC Waterland	
2010-02-14	Netherlands	3	37	France A	Fécamp	
2010-05-12	Netherlands	14	5	France A	Metz	2010 FIRA Trophy
2011-05-02	Netherlands	0	36	England A	INEF Bastiaqueiro	2011 FIRA Trophy
2011-05-04	Netherlands	20	17	Italy A	A Malata, Ferrol	2011 FIRA Trophy
