= Rugby Europe Women's Championship =

International sports competition

- Current season, competition or edition: 2025 Rugby Europe Women's Championship
- Sport: Rugby union
- Founded: 1988; 38 years ago
- No. of teams: 12
- Countries: Belgium; Bulgaria; Croatia; Finland; Germany; Latvia; Netherlands; Norway; Portugal; Romania; Spain; Sweden
- Continent: Europe
- Most recent champion: Spain (2025)
- Most titles: Spain (12 titles)

The Rugby Europe Women's Championship is an international competition contested between women's national rugby union teams who are members of Rugby Europe. The competition has its origins in a four nation "European Cup" held in 1988 but did not become an official FIRA competition until 1995. The competition has grown significantly and is divided into three divisions, viz. the Championship, Trophy and Conference.

== History ==
Since 2000 only the winner of the tournament held in between the Rugby World Cups (every four years, as highlighted) is officially recognised "European Champions", although teams winning tournaments in other years are often unofficially also described as "European Champions". This can cause some confusion, not least because the structure of the four-yearly tournament is invariably identical to the annual event. To make identification easier the competitions in the four yearly cycle are highlighted.

The only major difference between the "official" European Championships and other tournaments is that in the latter, between 2001 and 2007, England and France tended not to send their full strength national squads to the competition - though until 2007 they still played as "England" or "France". This has resulted in some confusion about the status of games played by these nations - England do not consider their games to be full internationals (or "tests") and do not award caps, whereas while France also do not give caps to their players in such matches, they do recognise the games as tests matches. FIRA and all other competing nations consider all the games to be "tests".

The 2009 tournament acted as Europe's qualification tournament for the World Cup (all entrants sending full strength squads), after which the test match status problem was finally resolved. From 2010 onwards it was announced that the non-Championship tournaments would be known as the "European Trophy" and any Six Nations entrants would officially be "A" sides (though in 2010 Italy, as they had not qualified for the 2010 World Cup, entered their full strength squad).

== Championship tournament ==
Year	Host	Final			Third place match		
Year	Host	Winner	Score	Runner-up	3rd place	Score	4th place
1988; Details	France	France	8 - 6	(United Kingdom); Great Britain	Netherlands	10-6	Italy
1995; Details	Italy	Spain	22 - 6	France	Italy	23 - 19	Netherlands
1996; Details	Spain	France	15 - 10	Spain	Italy	11 - 6	Netherlands
1997; Details	France	England	24 - 8	Scotland	Spain	25 - 8	France
1998	No tournament due to the 1998 Rugby World Cup						
1999; Details	Italy	France	13 - 5	Spain	Scotland	15 - 13	England
2000; Details	Spain	France	31 - 0	Spain	England	40 - 20	Scotland
2001; Details	France	Scotland	15 - 3	Spain	England	34 - 23	France
2002; Details	Italy	Italy	35 - 24	Sweden	Germany	12 - 10	Netherlands
2003; Details	Sweden	Spain	16 - 10	France	Sweden	15 - 10	Italy
2004; Details	France	France	8 - 6	England	Scotland	11 - 10	Wales
2005; Details	Germany	Italy	22 - 3	Netherlands	Sweden	17 - 5	Germany
2006; Details	Italy	Italy	28 - 7	Netherlands	Russia	-	Sweden
2007; Details	Spain	England	27 - 17	France	Spain	37 - 0	Netherlands
2008; Details	Netherlands	England	12 - 6	Wales	Ireland	12 - 12 (try count)	France
2009; Details	Sweden	Sweden	Joint winners	Scotland	Netherlands	Joint third	Spain
2010; Details	France	Spain	31-13	Italy	Netherlands	47-19	Sweden
2011; Details	Spain	England A	5-3	Spain	France A	17-7	Italy A
2012; Details	Italy	England	Pool	France	Italy	Pool	Spain
2013; Details	Spain	Spain	WC QF	Samoa			
2014; Details	Belgium	Netherlands	12-3	Belgium	Russia	34-21	Switzerland
2015; Details	Switzerland	Belgium	50-20	Switzerland	Russia	41-15	Czech Republic
2016; Details	Spain	Spain	35-7	Netherlands	Russia	74-5	Belgium
2017	No tournament due to the 2017 Rugby World Cup						
2018; Details	Belgium	Spain	40-7	Netherlands	Germany	24-5	Belgium
2019; Details	Various	Spain	54-0	Netherlands	Russia	22-5	Germany
2020; Details	Various	Spain	Round-robin	Russia	Netherlands		
2021	No tournament due to the COVID-19 pandemic						
2022; Details	Various	Spain	Round-robin	Russia	Netherlands		
2023; Details	Various	Spain	Round-robin	Netherlands	Sweden		
2024; Details	Various	Spain	Round-robin	Netherlands	Portugal	Round-robin	Sweden
2025; Details	Various	Spain	Round-robin	Netherlands	Portugal	Round-robin	Sweden
2026; Details	Various	TBD	Round-robin	TBD	TBD	Round-robin	TBD

=== Performance of nations ===
==== All tournaments ====
Teams reaching the top four
Team	Titles	Runners-up	Third place	Fourth place
Spain	12	5	2	2
France	5	4	1	3
England	5	1	2	1
Italy	3	1	3	4
Netherlands	1	7	5	4
Scotland	1	2	3	1
Sweden	1	1	3	3
Belgium	1	1		2
Czech Republic	1			1
Switzerland		2		1
Wales		1		1
Great Britain		1		
Samoa		1		
Russia		1	5	
Germany			2	2
Portugal			2	
Ireland			1	
Finland				1

==== Official FIRA tournaments ====
1. France - 4 titles, 3 runners-up, 1 third, 3 fourths
2. England - 4 titles, 1 runner-up, 2 thirds, 1 fourth
3. Spain - 3 titles, 5 runners-up, 3 thirds
4. Italy - 3 titles, 1 runner-up, 2 thirds, 2 fourth
5. Scotland - 2 titles, 1 runner-up, 2 thirds, 1 fourth
6. Sweden - 1 title, 1 runner-up, 2 thirds, 2 fourth
7. Netherlands - 2 runners-up, 2 third, 4 fourths
8. Wales - 1 runner-up, 1 fourth
9. Germany - 1 third, 1 fourth
10. Russia - 1 third
11. Ireland - 1 third

==== "European Championships" ====
1. France - 5 titles, 1 runner-up, 2 fourths
2. England - 2 titles, 1 runner-up, 1 third, 1 fourth
3. Spain - 1 title, 3 runners-up, 1 third
4. Scotland - 1 runner-up, 2 thirds, 1 fourth
5. Wales - 1 runner-up, 1 fourth
6. Great Britain - 1 runner-up
7. Italy - 2 thirds
8. Netherlands - 1 third, 2 fourths
9. Ireland - 1 third

== Trophy tournament ==
Year	Host	Final			Third place match		
Year	Host	Winner	Score	Runner-up	3rd place	Score	4th place
2000; Details	Spain	(France); French Flanders	Pool	Netherlands	Germany	N/A	—
2001; Details	France	Sweden	Pool	Netherlands	Germany	Pool	Belgium
2003; Details	Netherlands	Netherlands	19 - 12	Germany	Norway	10 - 10 (3 - 2 penalties)	Denmark
2004; Details	France	Netherlands	Pool	Germany	Norway	Pool	Denmark
2005; Details	Bosnia and Herzegovina	Russia	Pool	Norway	Bosnia and Herzegovina	N/A	—
2007; Details	Belgium	(France); French Universities	13 - 7	Belgium	Germany	15 - 0	Romania
2008; Details	Netherlands	Russia	31 - 14	(France); French Defence	Germany	19 - 15	Belgium
2012; Details	Sweden	Sweden	10 - 3	Netherlands	Russia	45 - 17	Finland
2018–19; Details	Various	Czech Republic	Round-robin	Switzerland	Finland	N/A	—
2019–20; Details	Various	Czech Republic	Round-robin	Switzerland	Sweden	Round-robin	Finland
2021–22; Details	Various	Sweden	Round-robin	Czech Republic	Switzerland	Round-robin	Finland
2022–23; Details	Various	Portugal	Round-robin	Finland	Germany	Round-robin	Czech Republic
2024–25; Details	Various	Belgium	Round-robin	Germany	Finland	N/A	—
2025–26; Details	Various	TBD	Round-robin	TBD	TBD	N/A	—

=== Performance of nations ===
1. Netherlands - 4 titles, 3 runners-up
2. Sweden - 3 titles, 1 runner-up
3. Russia - 2 titles, 3 third
4. Belgium - 1 title, 2 runners-up, 2 fourths
5. Czech Republic - 1 title, 1 runners-up, 1 fourth
6. France French Flanders - 1 title
7. Portugal - 1 title
8. (France) French Universities - 1 title
9. Germany - 2 runners-up, 4 thirds
10. Switzerland - 2 runners-up, 1 third, 1 fourth
11. Norway - 1 runner-up, 3 thirds
12. (France) French Defence - 1 runner-up
13. Finland - 1 third, 2 fourth
14. Bosnia and Herzegovina - 1 third
15. Denmark - 2 fourths
16. Romania - 1 fourth

== Conference tournament ==
Year	Host	Final			Third place match		
Year	Host	Winner	Score	Runner-up	3rd place	Score	4th place
2024–25; Details	Various	Latvia	Round-robin	Romania	Croatia	Round-robin	Bulgaria
2025–26; Details	Various	TBD	Round-robin	TBD	TBD	Round-robin	TBD

== See also ==
- Women's international rugby
