= Georgia women's national rugby union team =

Georgia
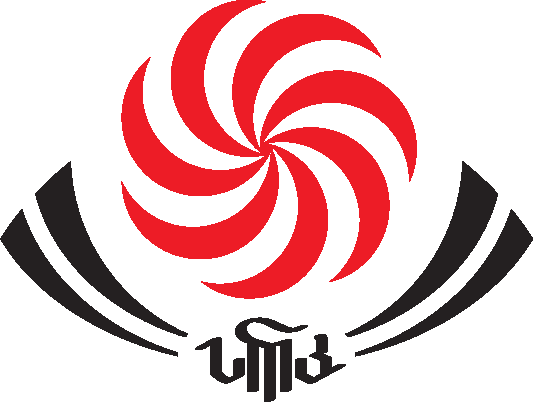
- Nickname: Lady Lelos
- Emblem: Borjgali
- Union: Georgian Rugby Union
- Head coach: Jaba Malaguradze
- Captain: Teona Chitaishvili
- Top scorer: Manoni Sagharadze (first-ever try)
First colours	Second colours

World Rugby ranking
- Current: 26 (as of 2 March 2026)
- Highest: 26 (2026)
- Lowest: 33 (2025)

First international
- Georgia 5–47 Kazakhstan (18 April 2025)

Biggest win
- Croatia 5–55 Georgia (22 February 2026)

Biggest defeat
- Georgia 5–47 Kazakhstan (24 April 2025)
- Website: Georgian Rugby Union

The Georgia women's national rugby union team represents Georgia in women's international rugby union. They are governed by the Georgian Rugby Union and played their first international match in 2025. The team is nicknamed the Lady Lelos, following the tradition of the Georgian men's team.

== History ==
The Georgian women's team played their first international test match on 18 April 2025, against Kazakhstan at Aia Arena in Kutaisi, Georgia. They lost 47–5, the match marked a milestone, with winger Manoni Sagharadze scoring the team’s first-ever try in the 26th minute. The second test was played on 24 April, ending in a 32–0 defeat.

Head coach Jaba Malaguradze, who was previously in charge of the national sevens side, was tasked with building the foundation of the 15s program, aiming to integrate the team into the Rugby Europe Women's Championship pathway.

=== Team nickname ===
The team is known as the Lady Lelos, a reference to the traditional Georgian game Lelo burti and the nickname of the men's national side. They use the Borjgali symbol as their emblem, consistent with the men's team.

=== Development and future ===
The growth of women's rugby in Georgia has faced cultural and structural barriers. However, with support from the Georgian Rugby Union and figures such as Ana Poghosian and development officer Natalie Kurtanidze, the women’s game is gaining momentum. The debut of the 15s side in 2025 marks a commitment to long-term development, with aspirations to qualify for European-level tournaments and eventually global competition.

Lady Lelos are participating in the 2025–26 Rugby Europe Women's Conference competition. They recorded their biggest win when they defeated Romania 43–0 in the opening match of the tournament.

== Results ==
Below is a summary of test matches played by Georgia, updated to 22 November 2025

Opponent	First game	Played	Won	Drawn	Lost	For	Against
Croatia	2026	1	1	0	0	55	5
Kazakhstan	2025	2	0	0	2	5	77
Romania	2025	1	1	0	0	43	0
Total		4	1	0	2	48	77

=== Full internationals ===
Won	Lost	Draw

Test	Date	Opponent	PF	PA	Venue	Event	Ref
1	2025-04-18	Kazakhstan	5	47	Aia Arena, Kutaisi, Georgia	Test	
2	2025-04-24	Kazakhstan	0	32	Kutaisi, Georgia	Test	
3	2025-11-22	Romania	43	0	CSN Elisabeta Lipa, Romania	2025–26 REC	
4	2026-02-22	Croatia	55	5	Sinj, Croatia	2025–26 REC	

== Coaching staff ==
- Head coach: Jaba Malaguradze
- Captain: Teona Chitaishvili.

== See also ==
- Georgia national rugby union team
- Rugby union in Georgia (country)
- Rugby Europe Women's Sevens
- Rugby Europe Women's Championship
