= European Women's Championship =

European Women's Championship may refer to:

- UEFA Women's Championship, in association football
- Rugby Europe Women's Championship, in rugby union
- Women's European Cricket Championship
- Women's European Volleyball Championship
- Women's Softball European Championship

== Basketball ==
- FIBA U16 Women's European Championship
- FIBA U18 Women's European Championship
- FIBA U20 Women's European Championship

== Handball ==
- European Women's Handball Championship
- European Women's U-19 European Handball Championship

== See also ==
- European Championship
