= 2025–26 Rugby Europe Women's Conference =

2025–26 Women's European Conference
Tournament details
- Date: 22 November 2025–30 June 2026
- Countries: Andorra; Austria; Bulgaria; Croatia; Czech Republic; Georgia; Greece; Norway; Romania
- Teams: 9
- Website: Rugby Europe

The 2025–26 Rugby Europe Women's Conference is the second edition of Rugby Europe's third division competition for women's national rugby union teams. The tournament kicked off on 22 November 2025.

== Standings ==
Pos	Team	Pld	W	D	L	PF	PA	PD	TF	TA	TB	LB	Pts
1	Georgia	2	2	0	0	98	5	+93	16	1	2	0	10
2	Andorra	1	1	0	0	29	5	+24	5	1	1	0	5
3	Greece	1	1	0	0	22	0	+22	4	0	1	0	5
4	Austria	1	1	0	0	20	7	+13	4	1	1	0	5
5	Czech Republic	1	0	0	1	7	20	−13	1	4	0	0	0
6	Bulgaria	1	0	0	1	0	22	−22	0	4	0	0	0
7	Romania	1	0	0	1	0	43	−43	0	7	0	0	0
8	Croatia	2	0	0	2	10	84	−74	2	14	0	0	0

== Results ==
22 November 2025	Romania	0–43	Georgia	CSN Elisabeta Lipa, Snagov
11:00 EET (UTC+2)			Try: Nino Tsiklauri 13' m Mariam Berandze 19' m Teona Chitaishvili 36' c Ani Kapanadze 46' c Ana Khabuliani 51' c Manoni Sagaradze 75' c Lika Khupenia 78' m Con: Teona Chitaishvili (4/7) 37', 47', 52', 76'; Cards: Nino Gogolidze (yellow card) 80+1'	Attendance: 120; Referee: Karina Krymova (UKR)

23 November 2025	Austria	20–7	Czech Republic	BLZ Atzgersdorf, Vienna
13:00 CET (UTC+1)	Try: Sina Beneditschitz 7' m Anna Wallensteiner 16' m Bianca Peham 39' m Karolina Pomej 75' m Cards: Anna Halswanter (yellow card) 60'		Try: Jana Urbanova 63' c Con: Natalie Skudrnova 64'; Cards: Pavla Zahradkova (yellow card) 23'	Attendance: 250; Referee: Marion Gauthier (FMR)

22 February 2026	Croatia	5–55	Georgia	Ragbi Klub, Sinj
13:00 CET (UTC+1)	Try: Tihana Zaja 61' m		Try: Lika Khupenia 6' m Kira Danelia 13' m Tamari Managadze 22' m Salome Makasarashvili 31' c Ani Kapanadze (2) 35' c, 43' c Manoni Sagaradze (2) 45' c, 78' c Ana Datiashvili 73' m Con: Ana Pogosyan (2) 32', 36'; Manoni Sagaradze (3) 44', 46', 79'; Cards: Nino Meparishvili (yellow card) 10'	Attendance: 100; Referee: Elena Loredana Juncanariu (FRR)

21 March 2026	Croatia	5–29	Andorra	Ragbi Klub, Sinj
14:00 CET (UTC+1)	Try: Marinela Elez 46' m Cards: Tihana Zaja (yellow card) 15'		Try: Daniela Ferreira 37' m Lea Mora 55' c Alba Albarellos Barreira 58' c Miren Barciela Garcia 62' m Mariona Barcons 80+3' m Con: Carla Micas 56'; Mariona Barcons 59'	Referee: Laura Wunsch (ÖRV)

21 March 2026	Greece	22–0	Bulgaria	Kevop Haidari Municipal Sports Center, Haidari
17:30 EET (UTC+2)		Report		Referee: Maria Francesca Novelli (FIR)
