= Romania women's national rugby union team =

Romania
- Nickname: Ghindele (The Acorns)
- Union: Federaţia Română de Rugby
- Head coach: Neculai Tarcan
First colours	Second colours

World Rugby ranking
- Current: 45 (as of 2 March 2026)
- Highest: 39 (2025)
- Lowest: 45 (2026)

First international
- Romania 65–0 Serbia (2007-04-11, FIRA)

Biggest win
- Romania 65–0 Serbia

Biggest defeat
- Romania 3–32 Russia (2008-05-19, FIRA)

The Romania women's national rugby union team represents Romania in women's international rugby union and played their first test match in 2007. Their widely recognized nickname "The Acorns", is an offshoot of the men's team which are called "The Oaks".

== History ==
The Romanian women's national team was first formed in 2007, they won their first international test match against Serbia on 11 April 2007 in Watermael-Boitsfort, with a score of 65–0, which remains their greatest success today.

They competed in the FIRA Women's European Championship in 2007 and 2008, they played only nine games, losing five and winning four. The team was disbanded after that before being revived again in 2024. They defeated Bulgaria 66–12 in the 2024–25 Rugby Europe Women's Conference tournament on 22 September 2024.

== Results summary ==
(Full internationals only)

Rugby: Romania internationals 2007-
Opponent	First game	Played	Won	Drawn	Lost	Percentage
Belgium	2007	2	0	0	2	0.00%
Bulgaria	2024	1	0	0	1	0.00%
Finland	2008	2	2	0	0	100.00%
Georgia	2025	1	0	0	1	0.00%
Germany	2007	1	0	0	1	0.00%
Luxembourg	2007	1	1	0	0	100.00%
Russia	2008	2	0	0	2	0.00%
Serbia	2007	1	1	0	0	100.00%
Summary	2007	11	4	0	7	36.36%

== Results ==
=== Full internationals ===
Won	Lost	Draw

Test	Date	Opponent	PF	PA	Venue	Tournament	Ref
1	11 April 2007	Serbia	65	0	Boisfort, Belgium	2007 FIRA	
2	12 April 2007	Luxembourg	38	0	Kituro (Brussels), Belgium	2007 FIRA	
3	13 April 2007	Belgium	0	20	Dendermonde, Belgium	2007 FIRA	
4	15 April 2007	Germany	0	15	Boisfort, Belgium	2007 FIRA	
5	19 May 2008	Finland	13	5	Utrecht, Netherlands	2008 FIRA	
6	19 May 2008	Russia	3	32	Utrecht, Netherlands	2008 FIRA	
7	21 May 2008	Belgium	7	15	Tilburg, Netherlands	2008 FIRA	
8	21 May 2008	Russia	0	29	Tilburg, Netherlands	2008 FIRA	
9	23 May 2008	Finland	12	5	Amsterdam	2008 FIRA	
10	22 September 2024	Bulgaria	66	12	CSN Elisabeta Lipa	2024–25 REC	
11	22 November 2025	Georgia	43	0	CSN Elisabeta Lipa	2025–26 REC	
