= 1988 Women's Rugby European Cup =

Rugby championship

Tournament details
- Host: France
- Dates: 21 May 1988– 23 May 1988
- Teams: 4

Final positions
- Champions: France
- Runner-up: Great Britain

Tournament statistics
- Matches played: 6

The 1988 Women's European Cup was the first women's rugby European championship and the first multi-national women's rugby competition of any sort, albeit not an official FIRA competition.

It was also the only occasion where a Great Britain side entered such a competition. In all future women's rugby competitions Great Britain would be represented by the four individual nations.

== Final table ==
Pos	Nation	Pld	W	D	L	PF	PA	PD	Pts
1	France	3	3	0	0	37	12	+25	9
2	Great Britain	3	2	0	1	64	17	+47	7
3	Netherlands	3	1	0	2	13	45	−32	5
4	Italy	3	0	0	3	18	58	−40	3

== Results ==
1988-05-21

France	13–3	Netherlands

Bourg en Bresse

1988-05-21

Great Britain	32–9	Italy

Bourg en Bresse

1988-05-22

France	16–3	Italy

Bourg en Bresse

1988-05-22

Great Britain	26–0	Netherlands

Bourg en Bresse

1988-05-23

France	8–6	Great Britain

Bourg en Bresse

1988-05-23

Italy	6–10	Netherlands

Bourg en Bresse

== See also ==
- Women's international rugby
- 1982 Netherlands v France women's rugby match (first women’s international rugby match)
- RugbyFest 1990 (first cross-continental women's rugby tournament)
