= 2019 Rugby Europe Women's Championship =

2019 Women's European Championship
- Date: 23 February–4 May 2019
- Countries: Spain; Netherlands; Germany; Russia

Final positions
- Champions: Spain
- Runner-up: Netherlands

Tournament statistics
- Matches played: 4

The 2019 Rugby Europe Women's Championship was the 23rd edition of Rugby Europe's top division competition for women's national rugby union teams, and the eleventh such tournament for which the European Championship title was awarded.

The tournament was held from 23 February to 4 May 2019 as a knockout competition, with the four highest ranked teams in Europe not participating in the Women's Six Nations competing. For the first time the competition was not held in a single location - each match instead was hosted by the higher seeded team. Spain won the championship to take its fourth European title and third consecutive title and seventh overall.

== Format ==
The four teams, based on the world rankings at the time of issuing the tournament regulations, were assigned a seeding from 1 to 4, the highest being that of Spain and, subsequently, the Netherlands, Germany and Russia. The format was a four team semifinal bracket, with the teams seeded 1 and 2 meeting the teams seeded 4 and 3 respectively. A final for the title was played between the two semifinal winners and a match for third place was played by the defeated semifinal teams.

== Results ==
Semi-finals
23 February 2019
Spain	41
Russia	0
9 March 2019
Netherlands	46
Germany	17

Final
3 May 2019
Spain	54
Netherlands	0
Third place
4 May 2019
Germany	5
Russia	22

=== Semi-finals ===
2019-02-23
16:00 CET (UTC+1)

Spain	41–0; Report	Russia

Madrid, Spain

2019-03-09
15:35 CET (UTC+1)

Netherlands	46–17; Report	Germany

Amsterdam, Netherlands

=== 3rd Place ===
2019-05-04
15:00 CET (UTC+1)

Germany	5–22; Report	Russia

Bonn, Germany

=== Final ===
2019-03-30
14:50 CET (UTC+1)

Spain	54–0; Report	Netherlands

Madrid, Spain

== See also ==
- 2018–19 Rugby Europe Women's Trophy
- Rugby Europe Women's Championship
- Women's international rugby union § 2019
