= Andorra women's national rugby union team =

National team that represents Andorra in international women's rugby union

Andorra
- Union: Andorran Rugby Federation (FAR)

World Rugby ranking
- Current: 30 (as of 23 March 2026)
- Highest: 30 (2026)
- Lowest: 36 (2025)

First international
- Andorra 119–0 Bulgaria

Biggest win
- Andorra 119–0 Bulgaria

The Andorra women's national rugby union team represents Andorra in rugby union. They played their first test match in April, 2024 becoming the 76th Women's international team to play a test match.

== History ==
Andorra played their first test match against Bulgaria on 6 April 2024 in Andorra la Vella. Cristina Modesto scored her country's first international test points.

== Results ==
=== Results summary ===
(Full internationals only, updated to 21 March 2026)

Andorra Internationals From 2023
Opponent	First match	Played	Won	Drawn	Lost	Win %
Bulgaria	2024	1	1	0	0	100%
Croatia	2026	1	1	0	0	100%
Summary		2	2	0	0	100%

=== Full internationals ===
Won	Lost	Draw

Test	Date	Opponent	PF	PA	Venue	Event	Ref
1	5 April 2024	Bulgaria	119	0	Andorra la Vella, Andorra	First test match	
2	21 March 2026	Croatia	29	5	Ragbi Klub, Sinj	2025–26 REWC	
