= 1996 FIRA Women's European Championship =

1996 FIRA European Championship
Tournament details
- Host: Spain
- Dates: 10 April 1996– 14 April 1996
- Teams: 5

Final positions
- Champions: France
- Runner-up: Spain

Tournament statistics
- Matches played: 7

The 1996 FIRA Women's European Championship was the second edition of the Women's European Championship. It saw the debut of Germany and a five-nation event.

The competition was initially a three-team two pools system but Russia withdrew a few days before the start. With no time for finding substitutes Pool B was left with only two teams, becoming in a "semi-final" for deciding the final place. The other final place was decided on a three-team pool (Pool A), won by Spain with wins over Netherlands and Germany.

On the competition calendar 5th/6th and 3rd/4th place matches were planned, but with the non participation of Russia a three-team pool was created. Italy played Netherlands and Germany, the results of these games being combined with the earlier match between Netherlands and Germany to decide 3rd-5th places.

== Results ==
=== Pool A ===
Pos	Nation	Pld	W	D	L	PF	PA	PD	Pts	Qualification
1	Spain	2	2	0	0	82	0	+82	4	Final
2	Netherlands	2	1	0	1	29	40	−11	2	Play-off
3	Germany	2	0	0	2	11	82	−71	0	Play-off

1996-04-10

Spain	53–0	Germany

Madrid

1996-04-11

Netherlands	29–11	Germany

Madrid

1996-04-12

Spain	29–0	Netherlands

Madrid

=== Pool B ===
1996-04-11

France	57–8	Italy

Madrid

=== 3rd-5th play-offs ===
Pos	Nation	Pld	W	D	L	PF	PA	PD	Pts
3	Italy	2	2	0	0	50	6	+44	4
4	Netherlands	2	1	0	1	35	22	+13	2
5	Germany	2	0	0	2	11	68	−57	0

1996-04-13

Italy	39–0	Germany

Madrid

1996-04-14

Italy	11–6	Netherlands

Madrid

=== Final ===
1996-04-14

Spain	10–15	France

Madrid

== See also ==
- Women's international rugby
