= Scottish Women's Rugby Union =

Defunct women's rugby governing body in Scotland

The Scottish Women's Rugby Union (SWRU) was the national governing body for women's rugby union in Scotland. It was responsible for the governance of women's rugby union within Scotland. Its role was all encompassing. It went from youth recruitment, through administrating all senior based (aged 16+) competition, through to the performance and management of the Scotland women's national rugby union team.

At their AGM in June 2009 the SWRU voted unanimously in favour of amalgamating the Scottish Rugby Union and the SWRU to form an integrated national governing body rugby in Scotland.

== Executive Board ==
The SWRU was led by a volunteer based Executive Board. Board members were elected at the Annual General Meeting (AGM) at June each year. The Executive Board was renamed from the Executive Committee in the 2007 AGM.The posts were annual in nature with the exception of the Chairperson, whose post was held for 2 years. Board members had to be affiliated with a women's rugby union club.

Past Board Members

- Chairperson and Scottish Rugby Union Council:
  - Sandra Kinnear (Lismore WRFC) 2006-2009
- Vice-Chair:
  - Rosy Hume (Murrayfield Wanderers WRFC) 2007-2009
  - Susan Young (Watsonians WRFC) 2006-2007
- Secretary:
  - Kate Ho (Edinburgh University LRFC) 2006-2009
  - Clare Murray 2004–2006
- International Fixtures Coordinator:
  - Kath Vass (Watsonians WRFC) 2006-2007
  - Ainsley Rawlings 2002–2004
- Domestic Fixtures Coordinator:
  - Beth Dickens (Murrayfield Wanderers WRFC) 2006-2009
- Youth Fixtures Coordinator:
  - Louise Dalgeish (Royal High Corstorphine WRFC) 2006-2009
  - Lesley Robertson 2004-2006
- Historian and Veteran Representative:
  - Kath Vass (Watsonians WRFC) 2007-2009
- HE/FE Coordinator:
  - Claire Fergusson, RHC Cougars 2007-2009
- Player Representative:
  - Heather Lockhart (Hillhead Jordanhill WRFC) 2007-2009
- Student's Representative:
  - Anna Panayotopoulos (Edinburgh University LRFC) 2006-2007
  - Emma-Beth Wilson 2001–2003
  - Fiona Shanks 2000–2001
- Ordinary Member:
  - Allan Douglas (Murrayfield Wanderers WRFC) 2006-2007
- Treasurer:
  - Ali MacKenize 2005–2006
  - Sheena Buchan 2001–2002

== Full time staff ==
In addition to the volunteer Executive Board, three full-time staff based at the Scottish Rugby Union assisted with the planning and delivery of the women's rugby union programme throughout Scotland. From 2001 to 2005 only 2 posts existed, the Women's Administration Manager and the Girls Development Officer. In 2005, in conjunction with the Scottish Rugby Union, the two posts were re-purposed, with another one created as a result. The new staffing structure consisted of a Community Manager, a Performance Development Manager (responsible for the performance pathways programme) and a Women's Development Officer (responsible for Youth and Senior rugby).

=== Previous full time staff ===
- Jo Wells, Women's Community Manager, appointed July 2006–present
- Jo Hull, National Performance Development Manager (women's), appointed Jan 2006–present
- Car Stevenson, Women's Development Officer, appointed 2008–present
- Barbara Wilson, First SWRU Administration Manager, 2001–2006
- Beth MacLeod, First SWRU Girls Development Manager, 2001–2005
- Claire Cruikshank, Youth Development Administrator, 2004–2006

== National Competitions ==
In the 2010-2011 season, there were four divisions within the Scottish league: Premier League 1, Premier League 2, National League and the National Development League.

=== Premier League 1 ===
- Edinburgh University
- University of Dundee
- Hillhead/Jordanhill
- Murrayfield Wanderers
- Royal High Corstorphine
- Watsonians
- Stirling

=== Premier League 2 ===
- Aberdeenshire Quines
- Cartha Queen's Park
- Glasgow University
- Kirkcaldy
- Melrose
- Morgan

=== National League ===
- Broughton
- Edinburgh University 2nds
- Grangemouth ()
- Lismore
- Oban Lorne
- Royal Dick Veterinary College
- Saints, The (Madras College FP RFC)
- Stirling County

=== National Development League ===
The National Development League consisted of a number of clubs which included:

- Berwick
- Lasswade
- Stirling University
- Strathaven
- Strathclyde University

== National 7s competition ==
Annually, a National 7s competition was traditionally held on the first weekend of May. For five years, it was held at Portobello Rugby Club in Edinburgh. The normal format was for teams to be split into two pools, with semi-finalists chosen through the top 2 winners of the pools.

== Scottish Universities Championship ==
The Scottish Universities Championship was not run by the SWRU, instead it was administered by the British University and Colleges Sport.

Winners:

- 2008 - 2009 : University of St Andrews
- 2007 - 2008 : Glasgow University
- 2006 - 2007 : Edinburgh University
- 2005 - 2006 : Edinburgh University

== Representative Rugby ==
In the 2006-2007 season, there were 4 tiers of women's representative teams run and managed by the SWRU, in order:

- Scotland Women's, the national team
- Scotland Women's Development, a development team which acts as a feeder to the national team
- Scotland Academy, a squad consisting of HE/FE players which attend a number of skills clinics
- Scotland U18s, the Under 18s team
