= 2008 FIRA Women's European Championship =

Rugby championship

2008 FIRA European Championship
Tournament details
- Host: Netherlands
- Dates: 17 May 2008– 23 May 2008
- Teams: 16

Tournament statistics
- Matches played: 30

The 2008 FIRA Women's European Championship was the 11th rugby union women's European championship organised by FIRA - AER.

It took place in the Netherlands from 17 to 24 May 2008; for the first time since 2004 both the A and B championships were held simultaneously in the same host country.

Eight national teams took part to the Pool A: the four Home Nations plus France, Spain and the Netherlands; as for Italy they withdrew and were replaced by Sweden. Amongst the contestants in the Pool B were also the "France Défense XV", the French Army women's rugby union squad.

== Results ==
England won the Pool A title against Wales in the final. There were no tries in the match, which effectively amounted to a kicking duel, with each team dominating one half. Non Evans scored two penalties for the Welsh in the first half and Katy McLean scored four for England in the second half. The English took the title with a final score of 12 to 6. Both teams produced good play during the tournament; however, in this particular match the defence stole the lead over the attack and the precision and discipline of the English won the day. The new Champions of Europe succeeded France, who only managed to attain fourth place - despite the final score, 22-22, in the play-off against Ireland the last place on the podium went to their opponents as they scored more tries. A surprise placing for the Scottish who came in fifth, winning 27 -25 against Spain in an incredible match (8 tries), probably one of the best of the Championship with Spain just losing out in injury time. In the match for seventh place, the Netherlands beat Sweden 7 to 6.

It was an easy win for Russia in the Group B final against the French Military team. Faster and more organized, the Russian players took control of the match very early on when their full-back and team captain, Anastasiya Mukharyamova launched a counterattack from the 22 metre line and a few passes later, Anna Gottseva finished between the posts. Throughout the tournament Russia produced some splendid clean, creative and collective play. The speed and agility of their backs meant that they emerged as the team with the best attacking play. Their players took major risks and didn't hesitate in launching counterattacks from anywhere on the pitch. It was no surprise when they won this afternoon in Amsterdam. Congratulations also to the Russian full-back Natalia Selyvtina, a very impressive “sidestepper”, who succeeded in scoring eleven tries during her team's five games. An incredible turnabout took place in the match for third place. Ten minutes from the end of the match, the Belgians were leading 15 to 7 and were expecting victory. However, they hadn't counted on the courage of the Germans who scored two late tries, taking the lead in the last minute and eventually winning the match 19 to 15. In the match for fifth place, Romanian won 12 – 5 against Finland.

FIRA-AER officials also selected the best players of the Championship. The jury, made up of Technical Directors and Match Commissioners selected:

- Group A, Barbara Pla, Spanish Back Row
- Group B, Anastasiya Mukharyamova, Russian full-back and also team Captain.

The Fair-play prize was awarded to Russia

== Pool A ==
=== Bracket ===
Quarter-finals
17 May – Amsterdam
England	80
Sweden	3
17 May – Amsterdam
Ireland	41
Spain	7
17 May – Amsterdam
Netherlands	3
France	24
17 May – Amsterdam
Scotland	10
Wales	27

Semi-finals
20 May – Drachten
England	22
Ireland	11
20 May – Leiden
France	10
Wales	18

Final
13 May – Amsterdam
England	12
Wales	6
Third place
13 May – Amsterdam
Ireland	22 (4T)
France	22 (3T)

Semi-finals
20 May – Leiden
Netherlands	0
Scotland	26
20 May – Drachten
Sweden	0
Spain	22

Final
24 May – Amsterdam
Scotland	27
Spain	25
Third place
24 May – Amsterdam
Netherlands	7
Sweden	6

=== Quarter-finals ===
2008-05-17

England	80–3	Sweden

Amsterdam

2008-05-17

Netherlands	3–24	France

Amsterdam

2008-05-17

Scotland	10–27	Wales

Amsterdam

2008-05-17

Ireland	41–7	Spain

Amsterdam

=== Semi-finals ===
==== Cup ====
2008-05-20

England	22–11	Ireland

Drachten, Netherlands

2008-05-20

France	10–18	Wales

Leiden, Netherlands

==== Plate ====
2008-05-20

Sweden	0–20	Spain

Drachten, Netherlands

2008-05-20

Netherlands	0–26	Scotland

Leiden, Netherlands

=== 7th/8th place ===
2008-05-24

Netherlands	7–6	Sweden

Amsterdam

=== 5th/6th place ===
2008-05-24

Scotland	27–25	Spain

Amsterdam

=== 3rd/4th place ===
2008-05-24

France	22–22	Ireland

Amsterdam

=== Final ===
2008-05-24

England	12–6	Wales

Amsterdam

== Pool B ==
=== Round 1 ===
==== Group A: Final table ====
Pos	Nation	Pld	W	D	L	PF	PA	PD	Pts
1	France Defence	2	2	0	0	22	5	+17	4
2	Germany	2	1	0	1	10	17	−7	2
3	Belgium	2	0	0	2	0	10	−10	0

==== Group A: Results ====
2008-05-19

Belgium	0–5	Germany

Castricum, Netherlands

2007-05-19

Germany	5-17	France Defence

Castricum, Netherlands

2007-05-19

Belgium	0-5	France Defence

Castricum, Netherlands

==== Group B: Final table ====
Pos	Nation	Pld	W	D	L	PF	PA	PD	Pts
1	Russia	2	2	0	0	71	3	+68	4
2	Romania	2	1	0	1	16	37	−21	2
3	Finland	2	0	0	2	5	52	−47	0

==== Group B: Results ====
2008-05-19

Finland	5–13	Romania

Utrecht, Netherlands

2008-05-19

Finland	0–39	Russia

Utrecht, Netherlands

2008-05-19

Romania	3–32	Russia

Utrecht, Netherlands

=== Round 2 ===
==== Group A: Final table ====
Pos	Nation	Pld	W	D	L	PF	PA	PD	Pts
1	Russia	2	2	0	0	51	0	+51	4
2	Belgium	2	1	0	1	15	29	−14	2
3	Romania	2	0	0	2	7	44	−37	0

==== Group A: Results ====
2008-05-21

Belgium	0–22	Russia

Tilburg, Netherlands

2008-05-21

Belgium	15–7	Romania

Tilburg, Netherlands

2008-05-21

Romania	0–29	Russia

Tilburg, Netherlands

==== Group B: Final table ====
Pos	Nation	Pld	W	D	L	PF	PA	PD	Pts
1	France Defence	2	2	0	0	39	7	+32	4
2	Germany	2	1	0	1	46	13	+33	2
3	Finland	2	0	0	2	3	68	−65	0

==== Group B: Results ====
2008-05-21

Finland	0-29	France Defence

Driebergen, Netherlands

2008-05-21

Finland	3–39	Germany

Driebergen, Netherlands

2008-05-21

Germany	7-10	France Defence

Driebergen, Netherlands

=== Finals ===
==== 5th/6th ====
2008-05-23

Finland	5–12	Romania

Amsterdam

==== 3rd/4th ====
2008-05-23

Belgium	15–19	Germany

Amsterdam

==== Final ====
2008-05-23

Russia	31-14	France Defence

Amsterdam

== See also ==
- Women's international rugby union
