= 2024–25 Rugby Europe Women's Conference =

2024–25 Women's European Conference
Tournament details
- Date: 22 September 2024–10 May 2025
- Countries: Bulgaria; Croatia; Latvia; Norway; Romania
- Teams: 5

Final positions
- Champions: Latvia
- Website: Rugby Europe

The 2024–25 Rugby Europe Women's Conference is the first edition of Rugby Europe's third division competition for women's national rugby union teams. The tournament kicked off on 22 September 2024 and concluded on 10 May 2025. Latvia and Norway played in their first official Rugby Europe competition.

== Standings ==
Pos	Team	P	W	D	L	PF	PA	PD	BP	Pts
1	Latvia	2	2	0	0	77	0	+77	2	10
2	Romania	1	1	0	0	66	12	+54	1	5
3	Croatia	1	1	0	0	17	10	+7	0	4
4	Bulgaria	2	0	0	2	22	83	–63	1	1
5	Norway	2	0	0	2	0	77	–77	0	0
Champion; Source:

== Results ==
22 September 2024	Romania	66–12	Bulgaria	CSN Elisabeta Lipa, Snagov
11:00 EEST (UTC+3)	Try: Raluca Ștefania Săvădan (3) 3' m, 29' m, 66' m Simona Roșca 11' m Renata Gabriela Prisecaru (2) 17' m, 47' m Carina-Elena Dascălu (3) 20' m, 31' c, 60' c Ana-Maria Hîrtan 39' m Olivia-Rose Gontineac 58' c Bianca Alexandra Preda 74' m Con: Bianca Alexandra Preda (3) 32', 59', 61'; Cards: Elena Tudosiu (yellow card) 36' to 46'; Simona Roșca (yellow card) 52' to 62'; Adriana Popescu (red card) 56'; Helena Teglas (yellow card) 80' to end'		Try: Veronika Tasleva 36' m Zhivka Ivanova 53' c Con: Zhivka Ivanova 54'	Attendance: 50; Referee: Laura Wunsch (ÖRV)

5 October 2024	Latvia	50–0	Norway	Ogre City Stadium, Ogre
14:00 EEST (UTC+3)	Try: Hanna Evelīna Neilande 7' m Marta Pukite (2) 12' m, 39' c Balba Silicka 23' m Patrīcija Paula Mūrniece (2) 28' c, 77' c Liene Dumpe 31' c Zane Sirsniņa 64' c Con: Hanna Evelīna Neilande (5) 29', 32', 40', 65', 78'			Referee: Vadims Galajevs (LRF)

16 November 2024	Bulgaria	10–17	Croatia	National Sports Academy "Vasil Levski", Sofia
14:00 EET (UTC+2)	Try: Miglena Vasileva 16' m Asya Donova 63' m Cards: Maria Buchkova (yellow card) 32' to 42'; Zhaklina Ivanova (yellow card) 68' to 78'		Try: Lara Josipović 33' m Ela Avramovic (2) 54' m, 71' c Con: Ela Avramovic 72'	Attendance: 200; Referee: Viktoria Magyar (HUN)

10 May 2025	Norway	0–27	Latvia	Voldsløkka idrettspark, Oslo
12:00 CEST (UTC+2)			Try: Hanna Evelīna Neilande (2) 4' m, 25' m Una Kraupsa 19' m Ilze Lazdane 61' m Marta Pukite 72' m Con: Hanna Evelīna Neilande (1/5); Cards: Alvine Bruneniece (yellow card) 30' to 40'	Attendance: 100; Referee: Marit Bras (NED)
