= 2007 FIRA Women's European Championship =

2007 FIRA European Championship
Tournament details
- Hosts: Spain; Belgium
- Dates: 28 April 2007– 5 May 2007
- Teams: 16

Final positions
- Champions: England
- Runner-up: France

Tournament statistics
- Matches played: 32

After several years of low key tournaments with the major nations absent, the 2007 Championship was the largest ever with 16 teams competing in two Pools, including four Six Nations countries, plus Spain keen to do well having been replaced Italy in that competition. England and France were as usual represented by "A" teams, and Wales sent a development squad, but other countries appeared to be at full-strength.

Pool B was also of interest with four nations making their 15-a-side debuts - Finland, Luxembourg, Romania, and Serbia.

== "Top 8" (In Madrid, Spain) ==
=== Pool 1 ===
Pos	Nation	Pld	W	D	L	PF	PA	PD	Pts
1	England	3	2	1	0	125	33	+92	8
2	Spain	3	2	1	0	91	31	+60	8
3	Italy	3	1	0	2	67	61	+6	5
4	Russia	3	0	0	3	8	166	−158	3

2007-04-28

England	62–0	Russia

Madrid, Spain

2007-04-28

Spain	15–6	Italy

Madrid, Spain

2007-04-30

England	41–11	Italy

Madrid, Spain

2007-04-30

Spain	54–3	Russia

Madrid, Spain

2007-05-02

Italy	50–5	Russia

Madrid, Spain

2007-05-02

Spain	22–22	England

Madrid, Spain

=== Pool 2 ===
Pos	Nation	Pld	W	D	L	PF	PA	PD	Pts
1	France	3	3	0	0	56	18	+38	9
2	Netherlands	3	2	0	1	40	35	+5	7
3	Sweden	3	1	0	2	23	40	−17	5
4	Wales	3	0	0	3	21	47	−26	3

2007-04-28

France	12–0	Sweden

Madrid, Spain

2007-04-28

Netherlands	12–3	Wales

Madrid, Spain

2007-04-30

France	27–8	Netherlands

Madrid, Spain

2007-04-30

Sweden	18–8	Wales

Madrid, Spain

2007-05-02

France	17–10	Wales

Madrid, Spain

2007-05-02

Netherlands	20–5	Sweden

Madrid, Spain

=== 7th/8th place ===
2007-05-05

Russia	14–38	Wales

Madrid, Spain

=== 5th/6th place ===
2007-05-05

Italy	0–6	Sweden

Madrid, Spain

=== 3rd/4th place ===
2007-05-05

Spain	37–0	Netherlands

Madrid, Spain

=== Final ===
2007-05-05

England	27–17	France

Madrid, Spain

== Pool B (Belgium) ==
=== Pool 1 ===
Pos	Nation	Pld	W	D	L	PF	PA	PD	Pts
1	Belgium	3	3	0	0	185	0	+185	9
2	Romania	3	2	0	1	103	20	+83	7
3	Luxembourg	3	1	0	2	20	111	−91	5
4	Serbia	3	0	0	3	0	177	−177	3

2007-04-11

Belgium	73–0	Luxembourg

Leuven, Belgium

2007-04-11

Romania	65–0	Serbia

Watermael-Boitsfort, Belgium

2007-04-12

Belgium	20–0	Serbia

Frameries, Belgium

2007-04-12

Luxembourg	0–38	Romania

Kituro (Brussels), Belgium

2007-04-13

Belgium	20–0	Romania

Dendermonde, Belgium

2007-04-13

Luxembourg	20–0	Serbia

Dendermonde, Belgium

=== Pool 2 ===
Pos	Nation	Pld	W	D	L	PF	PA	PD	Pts
1	(France) French Universities	3	3	0	0	134	32	+102	9
2	Germany	3	2	0	1	94	19	+75	7
3	Finland	3	0	1	2	27	86	−59	4
4	Norway	3	0	1	2	15	133	−118	4

2007-04-11

Norway	12–12	Finland

Boisfort, Belgium

2007-04-11

French Universities (France)	19-14	Germany

Leuven, Belgium

2007-04-12

Germany	48–0	Norway

Kituro (Brussels), Belgium

2007-04-12

French Universities (France)	42-15	Finland

Frameries, Belgium

2007-04-13

French Universities (France)	73-3	Norway

Liège, Belgium

2007-04-13

Germany	32–0	Finland

Liège, Belgium

=== 7th/8th place ===
2007-04-15

Norway	62–0	Serbia

Tervuren, Belgium

=== 5th/6th place ===
2007-04-15

Finland	14–7	Luxembourg

Tervuren, Belgium

=== 3rd/4th place ===
2007-04-15

Germany	15–0	Romania

Boisfort, Belgium

=== Final ===
2007-04-15

Belgium	7-13	(France) French Universities

Boisfort, Belgium

== See also ==
- Women's international rugby union
