= Croatia women's national rugby union team =

Croatia
- Union: Croatian Rugby Federation
- Head coach: Petra Druskovic
- Captain: Ela Avramović
First colours

World Rugby ranking
- Current: 42 (as of 23 March 2026)
- Highest: 31 (2025)
- Lowest: 42 (2026)

First international
- Croatia 37–5 Bulgaria

Biggest win
- Croatia 37–5 Bulgaria

Biggest defeat
- Croatia 5–55 Georgia

The Croatia women's national rugby union team are a sporting side that represents Croatia in rugby union. They played their first test match in 2023.

== History ==
Croatia played hosts to Bulgaria in both sides first-ever test match on 2 December 2023 at Sinj. They ran in seven tries and made one successful conversion to win the match 37–5.

== Results ==
=== Results summary ===
(Full internationals only, updated to 21 March 2026)

Croatia Internationals From 2023
Opponent	First match	Played	Won	Drawn	Lost	Win %
Andorra	2026	1	0	0	1	0%
Bulgaria	2023	2	2	0	0	100%
Georgia	2026	1	0	0	1	0%
Summary		4	2	0	2	50%

=== Full internationals ===
Won	Lost	Draw

Test	Date	Opponent	PF	PA	Venue	Event
1	2 December 2023	Bulgaria	37	5	Sinj, Croatia	First test match
2	16 November 2024	Bulgaria	17	10	National Sports Academy "Vasil Levski", Sofia	2024–25 REC
3	22 February 2026	Georgia	5	55	Ragbi Klub, Sinj	2025–26 REC
4	21 March 2026	Andorra	5	29	Ragbi Klub, Sinj	2025–26 REC
