= Latvia women's national rugby union team =

Latvia
- Union: Latvian Rugby Federation
- Head coach: Antonio Joao de Carvalho Abreu

World Rugby ranking
- Current: 40 (as of 23 March 2026)
- Highest: 38 (2025)
- Lowest: 47 (2024)

First international
- Latvia 7–41 Finland

Biggest win
- Latvia 50–0 Norway

Biggest defeat
- Latvia 0–63 Finland

The Latvia women's national rugby union team represents Latvia in rugby union. They played their first test match in 2023.

== History ==
Latvia made their international debut when they took on Finland at the Myllypuro Sports Park in Helsinki on 15 October 2023. They have been playing rugby sevens internationally since 2007 and made their first step into the fifteens code with their inaugural test match.

On 5 October 2024, Latvia and Norway played in their first official Rugby Europe competition, the match took place in Ogre City Stadium in Latvia.

== Results summary ==
(Full internationals only, updated to 20 September 2025)

Latvia Internationals From 2023
Opponent	First match	Played	Won	Drawn	Lost	Win %
Denmark	2025	1	0	1	0	0.00%
Finland	2023	2	0	0	2	0.00%
Norway	2024	2	2	0	0	100%
Summary		5	2	1	2	40%

== Results ==
=== Full internationals ===
Won	Lost	Draw

Test	Date	Opponent	PF	PA	Venue	Event	Ref
1	21 October 2023	Finland	7	41	Myllypuro Sports Park, Helsinki	First test match	
2	5 October 2024	Norway	50	0	Ogre City Stadium, Latvia	2024–25 Europe Conference	
3	26 October 2024	Finland	0	63	Zemgales Olimpiskais Centrs, Jelgava	Test match	
4	10 May 2025	Norway	27	0	Norway	2024–25 Europe Conference	
5	20 September 2025	Denmark	15	15	Riga Technical College Rugby Field, Riga	Test	
