= 2002 FIRA Women's European Nations Cup =

2002 FIRA European Nations Cup
Tournament details
- Host: Italy
- Dates: 20 March 2002– 23 March 2002
- Teams: 4

Final positions
- Champions: Italy
- Runner-up: Sweden

Tournament statistics
- Matches played: 4

The 2002 FIRA Women's European Nations Cup was the seventh edition of the competition and was held as a preparation for the World Cup, a short tournament for four nations who were not in the Six Nations took place in Italy. While it does not appear to be part of the Women's European Championship sequence, it was very similar to the European Championship, especially the Pool B competitions. A similar tournament took place before the World Cup in 2006.

== Bracket ==
Semi-finals
20 March – Treviso
Italy	16
Germany	0
20 March – Treviso
Netherlands	0
Sweden	22

Final
23 March – Treviso
Italy	35
Sweden	24
Third place
23 March – Treviso
Germany	12
Netherlands	10

== Semi finals ==
2002-03-20

Netherlands	0–22	Sweden

Treviso, Italy

2002-03-20

Italy	16–0	Germany

San Donà

== 3rd/4th place ==
2002-03-23

Germany	12–10	Netherlands

Treviso

== Final ==
2002-03-23

Italy	35–24	Sweden

Treviso

== See also ==
- Women's international rugby union
