= 1995 FIRA Women's European Championship =

1995 FIRA European Championship
Tournament details
- Host: Italy
- Dates: 12 April 1995– 16 April 1995
- Teams: 4

Final positions
- Champions: Spain
- Runner-up: France

Tournament statistics
- Matches played: 4

The 1995 FIRA Women's European Championship was the first official FIRA championship. Four countries entered, and the competition was a straight knockout tournament.

== Bracket ==
Semi-finals
12 April – Treviso
France	17
Netherlands	0
12 April – Treviso
Italy	0
Spain	5

Final
16 April – Treviso
France	6
Spain	22
Third place
16 April – Treviso
Italy	23
Netherlands	19

== Semi-finals ==
1995-04-12

France	17–0	Netherlands

Treviso

1995-04-12

Italy	0–5	Spain

Treviso

== Third place ==
1995-04-16

Italy	23–19	Netherlands

Treviso

== Final ==
1995-04-16

France	6–20	Spain

Treviso

== See also ==
- Women's international rugby
