= 2025–26 Rugby Europe Women's Trophy =

2025–26 Women's European Trophy

Tournament details
- Date: 25 October 2025 – 4 April 2026
- Countries: Finland; Germany; Sweden
- Teams: 3

Final positions
- Champions: Germany (1st title)
- Runner-up: Sweden

Tournament statistics
- Matches played: 3
- Tries scored: 21 (7 per match)
- Attendance: 1,300 (433 per match)
- Website: Rugby Europe

The 2025–26 Rugby Europe Women's Trophy was the 14th edition of Rugby Europe's second division competition for women's national rugby union teams.

== Standings ==
Pos	Team	P	W	D	L	PF	PA	PD	BP	Pts
1	Germany	2	2	0	0	97	0	97	2	10
2	Sweden	2	1	0	1	18	36	-18	0	4
3	Finland	2	0	0	2	7	86	-79	0	0
Champion

== Results ==
25 October 2025
12:00 EEST (UTC+3)

Finland	7–18	Sweden
Try: Heidi Hennessy 37' c Con: Anna Soiluva 38'		Try: Isabell Wijkström 46' m Isa Junttila 58' m Keli Franks 80' m Pen: Maja Framming 12'

Ruutisavu Areena, Vantaa
Attendance: 100
Referee: Marit Bras (NLD)

28 February 2026
14:30 CET (UTC+1)

(1BP) Germany	68–0	Finland
Try: Sophie Fella 3' m Paula Schult (3) 17' c, 44' c, 80+2' m Johanna Hacker (5) 23' c, 35' m, 46' m, 49' m, 60' m Mette Zimmat (2) 30' m, 55' c Ronja Hinterding 63' m Con: Charlotte Malaizier (3) 18', 24', 45'; Manja Bechtel 56'

Fritz-Grunebaum-Sportpark, Heidelberg
Attendance: 900
Referee: Mariam Goguadze (GRU)

4 April 2026
11:00 CEST (UTC+2)

Sweden	0–29	Germany (1BP)
		Try: Mette Zimmat (2) 4' c, 53' m Lara Burger 20' c Johanna Hacker 39' m Sarah Gossman 78' m Con: Charlotte Malaizier (2) 5', 21'

Trelleborg Rugby Arena, Trelleborg
Attendance: 300
Referee: Mariam Goguadze (GRU)
