= Bulgaria women's national rugby union team =

Bulgaria
- Union: Bulgarian Rugby Federation
- Head coach: Maya Tsankova

World Rugby ranking
- Current: 47 (as of 2 March 2026)
- Highest: 41 (2023)
- Lowest: 51 (2024)

First international
- Bulgaria 5–37 Croatia

Biggest defeat
- Andorra 119–0 Bulgaria

The Bulgaria women's national rugby union team represents Bulgaria in rugby union. They played their first test match in 2023.

== History ==
Bulgaria played their first test match against Croatia on 2 December 2023 at Sinj. It was both sides first-ever international with hosts, Croatia, winning the match. Veronika Tasleva created history when she scored her teams first and only points.

== Results ==
=== Results summary ===
(Full internationals only, updated to 22 September 2024)

Bulgaria Internationals From 2023
Opponent	First match	Played	Won	Drawn	Lost	Win %
Andorra	2024	1	0	0	1	0.00%
Croatia	2023	2	0	0	2	0.00%
Romania	2024	1	0	0	1	0.00%
Summary	2023	4	0	0	4	0.00%

=== Full internationals ===
Won	Lost	Draw

Test	Date	Opponent	PF	PA	Venue	Event
1	2 December 2023	Croatia	5	37	Sinj, Croatia	First test match
2	5 April 2024	Andorra	0	119	Andorra la Vella, Andorra	
3	22 September 2024	Romania	12	66	CSN Elisabeta Lipa	2024–25 RE Women's Conference
4	16 November 2024	Croatia	10	17	National Sports Academy "Vasil Levski", Sofia	2024–25 RE Women's Conference
