= 2014 Rugby Europe Women's Trophy =

2014 Women's European Trophy
Tournament details
- Host: Belgium

Final positions
- Champions: Netherlands
- Runner-up: Belgium

Tournament statistics
- Matches played: 4

The 2014 Rugby Europe Women's Trophy was held in Belgium. It was held from October 30 to November 2, 2014. The Czech Republic and Switzerland had a qualification play-off in June, prior to the main tournament. Switzerland joined three other teams to compete for the Rugby Europe Women's Trophy.

Netherlands won the tournament after defeating Belgium in the final.

== Qualification play-off ==
2014-06-28

Czech Republic	3–32	Switzerland

Prag, Czech Republic

== Main Tournament ==
Semifinals
Switzerland	0
Netherlands	39
Belgium	29
Russia	7

Finals
Netherlands	12
Belgium	3
Third place
Switzerland	24
Russia	31

=== First round ===
2014-10-30

Switzerland	0–39	Netherlands
	Report

Brussels, Belgium

2014-10-30

Belgium	29–7	Russia
	Report

Brussels, Belgium

=== 3rd Place ===
2014-11-02

Switzerland	24–31	Russia
	Report

Brussels, Belgium

=== Final ===
2014-11-02

Belgium	3–12	Netherlands
	Report

Brussels, Belgium
