= Scotland women's national rugby union team =

Scotland
- Union: Scottish Rugby Union
- Head coach: (Scotland) Dave Butcher
- Captain: Rachel Malcolm
- Most caps: Donna Kennedy (115)
- Top scorer: Helen Nelson (244)
- Top try scorer: Lucy Millard (37)
First colours	Second colours

World Rugby ranking
- Current: 6 (as of 22 September 2025)
- Highest: 5

First international
- Scotland 10–0 Ireland (Edinburgh, Scotland; 14 February 1993)

Biggest win
- Russia 0–84 Scotland (Enköping, Sweden; 17 May 2009)

Biggest defeat
- England 89–0 Scotland (Twickenham, England; 13 March 2011)

World Cup
- Appearances: 7 (First in 1994)
- Best result: 5th, 1994

The Scotland women's national rugby union team represents Scotland in women's international rugby union and is governed by the Scottish Rugby Union. The team competes in the annual Women's Six National Championship and has competed in five of the Women's Rugby World Cups since their hosted debut in 1994. The Nation plays an important role in the rugby world stage.

== History ==
Scotland Women's first official test match was played against Ireland at Raeburn Place in Edinburgh on 14 February 1993, ending in a 10–0 win to the hosts. Leading from the front, first Scotland captain Sandra Colamartino was the scorer of both tries.

In April of the following year, Scotland stepped in as alternate host of the 1994 Women's Rugby World Cup, finishing fifth, the team's best appearance to date. Since then, the Women's team have competed in the 1998, 2002, 2006, 2010 and 2021 iterations of the tournament.

The early streak of success peaked on 21 March 1998, as a 8–5 win over England in their final match of the Home Nations Championship marked the achievement of a Grand Slam for Scotland.

The Scottish Women's Rugby Union (SWRU) was the national governing body for women's rugby union in Scotland. It was responsible for the governance of women's rugby union within Scotland. Its role was all-encompassing. It went from youth recruitment, through administering all senior based (aged 16+) competition, through to the performance and management of the Scotland women's national rugby union team.

At its AGM in June 2009, the SWRU voted unanimously in favour of amalgamating the Scottish Rugby Union and the SWRU to form an integrated national governing body rugby in Scotland.

== Thistle and the anthem ==
The thistle is the national flower, and also the symbol of the Scotland national rugby union team. According to legend the "guardian thistle" has played its part in the defence of Scotland against a night attack by Norwegian Vikings, one of whom let out a yell of pain when he stepped barefoot on a thistle, alerting the Scottish defenders. The Latin Nemo me impune lacessit ("No-one provokes me with impunity!" in English) is the motto of Scotland's premier chivalric order, the Most Ancient and Most Noble Order of the Thistle.

"Flower of Scotland" has been used since 1990 as Scotland's unofficial national anthem. It was written by Roy Williamson of The Corries in 1967, and adopted by the SRU to replace "God Save the Queen".

== Strip ==
Scotland have traditionally worn navy blue jerseys, white shorts and blue socks. On the occasion that Scotland is the home side and the opposing team normally wears dark colours, Scotland will use its change strip. Traditionally this is a white jersey with navy blue shorts and socks. During a sponsorship deal, purple was introduced to the traditional blue jersey. This was a significant departure from the traditional colours of blue and white, although purple is inspired from the thistle flower.

== Results summary ==
=== Overall ===
Women's World Rugby Rankings Top 20 rankings as of 6 April 2026
Rank	Change*	Team	Points
1	Steady	England	98.09
2	Steady	Canada	91.53
3	Steady	New Zealand	89.85
4	Steady	France	83.60
5	Steady	Ireland	78.20
6	Steady	Scotland	77.39
7	Steady	Australia	75.46
8	Steady	United States	72.90
9	Steady	Italy	72.37
10	Steady	South Africa	71.62
11	Steady	Japan	69.72
12	Steady	Wales	66.13
13	Steady	Fiji	63.98
14	Steady	Spain	62.42
15	Steady	Samoa	59.72
16	Steady	Hong Kong	57.56
17	Steady	Netherlands	57.42
18	Steady	Russia	55.10
19	Steady	Kazakhstan	53.88
20	▲1	Germany	51.10
*Change from the previous week

(Full internationals only)
Correct as of 19 June 2025

Rugby: Scotland internationals 1993–
Opponent	First game	Played	Won	Drawn	Lost	Percentage
Australia	1999	4	0	0	4	0.00%
Belgium	2009	1	1	0	0	100.00%
Canada	1994	7	1	0	6	14.29%
Colombia	2022	1	1	0	0	100.00%
England	1994	34	2	0	32	5.88%
Fiji	2024	1	1	0	0	100%
France	1998	30	5	1	24	16.67%
Ireland	1993	34	18	0	16	52.94%
Italy	1988	25	9	1	15	36%
Japan	2019	4	3	0	1	75%
Kazakhstan	2006	1	1	0	0	100.00%
Netherlands	1995	6	5	0	1	83.33%
New Zealand	1994	4	0	0	4	0.00%
Russia	1994	2	2	0	0	100.00%
Samoa	2002	1	1	0	0	100.00%
South Africa	2010	6	4	0	2	66.67%
Spain	1997	24	16	0	8	66.67%
Sweden	1994	9	9	0	0	100.00%
United States	1998	7	2	0	5	28.57%
Wales	1993	39	19	0	20	48.72%
Summary	1993	240	100	2	138	41.67%

=== World Cup ===
Rugby World Cup
Year	Round	Pld	W	D	L	PF	PA
(Wales) 1991	Did not participate						
(Scotland) 1994	5th place	5	3	0	2	72	42
(Netherlands) 1998	6th place	5	2	0	3	89	141
(Spain) 2002	6th place	4	2	0	2	41	53
(Canada) 2006	6th place	5	3	0	2	67	72
(England) 2010	8th place	5	1	0	4	57	132
(France) 2014	Did not qualify						
(Ireland) 2017	Did not qualify						
(New Zealand) 2021	Pool stage	3	0	0	3	27	89
(England) 2025	Knockout stage	4	2	0	2	94	103
(Australia) 2029	TBD						
(United States) 2033	TBD						
Total	5th Place	31	3	0	18	447	632
Champions Runners-up Third place Fourth place / Home venue

== Players ==
=== Current squad ===
On 6 October 2026, acting Scotland head coach Dave Butcher named a 32-strong squad for the team's WXV Global Series fixtures against Australia in October 2026.

Head coach: (Scotland) Dave Butcher (interim)

Player	Position	Date of birth (age)	Caps	Club/province
Leah Bartlett	Prop	28 August 1998 (aged 28)	57	(England) Sale Sharks
Holland Bogan	Second row	2 May 1999 (aged 27)	7	(Scotland) Glasgow Warriors
Sarah Bonar	Flanker	9 February 1994 (aged 32)	53	(England) Harlequins
Becky Boyd	Second row	17 May 2004 (aged 22)	7	(Scotland) Glasgow Warriors
Elliann Clarke	Prop	16 February 2001 (aged 25)	32	(Scotland) Glasgow Warriors
Hollie Cunningham	Second row	4 June 1999 (aged 27)	9	(England) Bristol Bears
Eva Donaldson	Second row	10 July 2001 (aged 25)	29	(England) Sale Sharks
Adelle Ferrie	Second row	14 October 1997 (aged 28)	9	(Scotland) Edinburgh Rugby
Evie Gallagher	Back row	22 August 2000 (aged 26)	45	(England) Bristol Bears
Rachel Malcolm (c)	Flanker	23 May 1991 (aged 35)	67	(England) Trailfinders
Elis Martin	Hooker	23 May 1999 (aged 27)	30	(Scotland) Edinburgh Rugby
Rachel McLachlan	Flanker	26 February 1999 (aged 27)	60	(France) Montpellier HR
Molly Poolman	Prop	10 May 2004 (aged 22)	15	(Scotland) Edinburgh Rugby
Lana Skeldon	Hooker	18 October 1993 (aged 32)	90	(England) Bristol Bears
Imogen Spence	Prop	3 October 1998 (aged 28)	0	(Scotland) Glasgow Warriors
Aicha Sutcliffe	Hooker	28 November 2004 (aged 21)	5	(Scotland) Glasgow Warriors
Demi Swann	Prop	1 December 1995 (aged 30)	5	(England) Exeter Chiefs
Anne Young	Prop	17 March 2000 (aged 26)	26	(Scotland) Glasgow Warriors
Ceitidh Ainsworth	Fly-half	1 January 2004 (aged 22)	3	(Scotland) Glasgow Warriors
Leia Brebner-Holden	Scrum-half	26 May 2002 (aged 24)	21	(Scotland) Edinburgh Rugby
Katie Buchanan	Scrum-half	31 July 2003 (aged 23)	3	(England) Exeter Chiefs
Shona Campbell	Wing	7 June 2001 (aged 25)	17	(England) Sale Sharks
Rhea Clarke	Scrum-half	31 August 2003 (aged 23)	6	(Scotland) Glasgow Warriors
Nicole Flynn	Centre	19 September 2005 (aged 21)	0	(Scotland) Glasgow Warriors
Rhona Lloyd	Wing	17 October 1996 (aged 29)	69	(England) Sale Sharks
Helen Nelson	Fly-half	24 May 1994 (aged 32)	83	(England) Trailfinders
Rachel Philipps	Centre	17 January 2002 (aged 24)	6	(Scotland) Edinburgh Rugby
Hannah Ramsay	Fly-half	4 September 2003 (aged 23)	5	(Scotland) Edinburgh Rugby
Chloe Rollie	Fullback	26 June 1995 (aged 31)	89	(Scotland) Edinburgh Rugby
Lucia Scott	Fullback	2 March 2004 (aged 22)	12	(Scotland) Glasgow Warriors
Meryl Smith	Centre	11 June 2001 (aged 25)	30	(England) Bristol Bears
Evie Wills	Centre	4 February 2001 (aged 25)	11	(Scotland) Glasgow Warriors

=== Notable internationalists ===
- Paula Chalmers (scrum half), named in World Cup Star XV
- Donna Kennedy (back row), most capped Scottish internationalist
- Jade Konkel (back row), first full-time professional Scottish internationalist

=== Award winners ===
==== World Rugby Awards ====
The following Scotland players have been recognised at the World Rugby Awards since 2001:

World Rugby Women's 15s Player of the Year
Year	Nominees	Winners
2004	Donna Kennedy	Donna Kennedy

==== Six Nations Awards ====
The following Scotland players have been recognised in the Women's Six Nations Awards since 2020:

Six Nations Team of the Championship
Year	Forwards		Backs		Total
Year	No.	Players	No.	Players	Total
2022	—		10.	Helen Nelson	1
2023	2.	Lana Skeldon	15.	Chloe Rollie	2
2024	—				0
2025	7.	Evie Gallagher	10.	Helen Nelson (2)	2

Six Nations Player of the Championship
Year	Nominees	Winners
2025	Evie Gallagher	—

== Honours ==
- WXV
  - WXV2 Winners: 2023
- Home Nations Championship
  - Winners: 1998
- European Championship
  - Winners: 2001

== See also ==
Women's international rugby – the most complete listing of women's international results since 1982
