= 1982 Netherlands v France (women's rugby union match) =

First women's rugby union test match

Netherlands v France
- Event: Dutch Rugby Union 50th Anniversary
Netherlands	France
(Netherlands)	(France)
0	4
- Date: 13 June 1982
- Venue: Utrecht Sportpark Strijland, Utrecht
- Referee: Roel Wijnant (Belgium)

Netherlands v France in 1982 was the first women's rugby union test match. 1982 was the 50th anniversary of the Dutch Rugby Union and, as part of the celebrations, the Dutch invited the Association Française de Rugby Féminin (AFRF) to send a France women's national rugby union team to play a Netherlands women's national rugby union team. The match was covered by reporter Henk Hansen of the Dutch news magazine Panorama.

The match was played on 13 June 1982 at the Utrecht Sportpark Strijland, the home of Utrechtse Rugby Club, in Utrecht, Netherlands. The Netherlands were led by head coach Jopie Wessels and captained by their prop Lisa Groenedijk; France were led by head coach Clause Isoard. The match referee was Roel Wijnant of Belgium. The match resulted in a 4–0 victory for France.

== Details ==
13 June 1982

Netherlands	0–4	France
		Try: 62' I. Decamp

Utrecht Sportpark Strijland, Utrecht
Referee: Roel Wijnant (Belgium)

FB	15	Hanneke Brouwer
RW	14	Mirjam Baars
OC	13	Jacklien Len
IC	12	Leontien Hendriks
LW	11	Odet Zijlstra
FH	10	Renske Kruyk
SH	9	Friedi Kloen
N8	8	Antoinet Geerts
OF	7	Ans van Liere
BF	6	Evelijn Castell
RL	5	Cora Elbers
LL	4	Divera Twisk
TP	3	Fransje de Waard
HK	2	Frieke van Schouwen
LP	1	Lisa Groenedijk (C)
Replacements:
PR	16	Diana de la Mar
SH	17	Heleen Smallegange
LK	18	Heidy Steinbuch
IC	19	Yvonne van Dijk
SH	20	Marga Haent jes-Dekker
OC	21	Histe Galama
Coach:
Jopie Wessels

FB	15	Viviane Berodier
RW	14	Isabelle Decamp
OC	13	Monique Fraysse
IC	12	Nicole Fraysse
LW	11	Pascale Champeil
FH	10	Odette Desprats
SH	9	Judith Benassayag
N8	8	Carinne Matbleu
OF	7	Sylvia Benassayag
BF	6	Catherine Guillon
RL	5	Macha Degeitere
LL	4	Annick Jambon
TP	3	Sylvie Girard
HK	2	Maryse Pomathiot
LP	1	Véronique Champeil
Replacements:
	16	Sylvia Duclos
	17	Andrée Forestier
	18	M.L. Biezeray
	19	Claude Guy M.
	20	Sylvie Barriere
	21	Regine Pacaud
Coach:
Claude Izoard

== See also ==
- History of women's rugby union matches between France and the Netherlands
