= Women's international rugby union =

Rugby union

Women's international rugby union has a history dating back to the late 19th century. It was not until 1982 that the first international fixture (test match) took place. The match was organised in connection with the Dutch Rugby Union's 50th anniversary: as part of the celebrations, on 13 June 1982, the France national women's team played the Netherlands in Utrecht, with France winning 4–0. (Note: A try was only worth four points in 1982, the five-point try not being introduced until 1992.) This match has since been recognised as the first-ever women's international test match. (Note: This article lists rugby matches considered "full internationals" or "test matches" by most independent observers. It includes: Tournament games between national XVs in full international competitions.; Friendly matches that are promoted as being between full-strength national teams.; Other fixtures recognised as full internationals by independent authorities.; The list may differ from official national union records, as some unions exclude games where they fielded a weaker team or include matches against unofficial or "A" teams.)

Official recognition of women's internationals was not immediate, as almost all women's rugby was originally organised outside of the control of either national unions or World Rugby for many years. As a result, no internationally agreed list of rugby internationals exists; even in the men's game, World Rugby does not decide which matches are test matches, leaving such decisions up to participating unions. As a result, one country may classify a match as a full international (and award full test caps) while the opposition may not: countries may even award caps for games against an opposition that is not a national team (World XVs, for example).

Women's international rugby developed gradually. Sweden joined France and the Netherlands in 1984, followed by Italy in 1985. The first international match outside Europe took place in 1987 between the United States and Canada. In 1990, New Zealand hosted a match, marking the first game played in or involving a team from the Southern Hemisphere.

Over 1,000 internationals have now been played. Traditional centres of rugby in New Zealand, England, and France have been the most successful nations, but they have been joined by several "non-traditional" nations who have also been successful, such as the United States and more recently Canada.

== Rankings ==
Women's World Rugby Rankings Top 20 rankings as of 6 April 2026
| Rank | Change* | Team | Points |
|---|---|---|---|
| 1 | Steady | England | 98.09 |
| 2 | Steady | Canada | 91.53 |
| 3 | Steady | New Zealand | 89.85 |
| 4 | Steady | France | 83.60 |
| 5 | Steady | Ireland | 78.20 |
| 6 | Steady | Scotland | 77.39 |
| 7 | Steady | Australia | 75.46 |
| 8 | Steady | United States | 72.90 |
| 9 | Steady | Italy | 72.37 |
| 10 | Steady | South Africa | 71.62 |
| 11 | Steady | Japan | 69.72 |
| 12 | Steady | Wales | 66.13 |
| 13 | Steady | Fiji | 63.98 |
| 14 | Steady | Spain | 62.42 |
| 15 | Steady | Samoa | 59.72 |
| 16 | Steady | Hong Kong | 57.56 |
| 17 | Steady | Netherlands | 57.42 |
| 18 | Steady | Russia | 55.10 |
| 19 | Steady | Kazakhstan | 53.88 |
| 20 | ▲1 | Germany | 51.10 |
*Change from the previous week

Prior to 2016 there was no official ranking of the women's teams based on game performance; World Rugby used the placings in the preceding World Cup. However, there were multiple unofficial rankings created, including by Rugby Europe, rugby statistician Serge Piquet, and the statistics website The Roon Ba.

Since February 2016 nations are ranked based on their game results similar to the men's teams, with the most successful teams being ranked highest.

== See also ==
- Canada Cup
- Caribbean Women's Rugby Championship
- FIRA Women's European Championship
- Scottish Women's Rugby Union
- Pacific Tri-Nations
- Women's rugby union
- Women's Rugby World Cup
- Women's Six Nations Championship
- Women's International Rugby Union Sevens
- Women's international rugby union results summary
- List of women's international rugby union test matches
- Women's international rugby union (non test matches)
- Rugby Africa Women's Cup
