= List of Belgium women's national rugby union team matches =

The following is a list of Belgium women's national rugby union team international matches.

== Full internationals ==
Won	Lost	Draw

=== 1980s ===
Test	Date	Opponent	PF	PA	Venue	Event	Ref
1	1986-12-31	Sweden	0	32	Brussels	First Test	
2	1988-11-27	France	0	66	King Baudouin Stadium, Brussels	Test	

=== 2000s ===
Test	Date	Opponent	PF	PA	Venue	Event	Ref
3	2000-02-20	Netherlands	7	54	Amsterdam	Test	
4	2001-04-08	Netherlands	0	105	Amsterdam	Test	
5	2001-05-07	Netherlands	0	66	Lille	Test	
6	2001-05-09	Sweden	0	90	Roubaix	Test	
7	2001-05-12	Germany	3	67	Armentières	Test	
8	2006-03-25	Netherlands	15	7	Brussels	Test	
9	2006-04-23	Italy	0	34	Stadio Comunale di Monigo, Treviso	2006 FIRA	
10	2006-04-23	Russia	0	24	San Donà di Piave	2006 FIRA	
11	2006-04-26	Norway	41	0	San Donà di Piave	2006 FIRA	
12	2006-04-29	Sweden	0	32	San Donà di Piave	2006 FIRA	
13	2007-04-01	Netherlands	5	62	Eindhoven	Test	
14	2007-04-11	Luxembourg	73	0	Leuven	Test	
15	2007-04-12	Serbia	20	0	Frameries	Test	
16	2007-04-13	Romania	20	0	Dendermonde	Test	
17	2007-12-01	Netherlands	7	19	Ghent	Test	
18	2008-05-19	Germany	0	5	Castricum	2008 FIRA	
19	2008-05-21	Russia	0	22	Tilburg	2008 FIRA	
20	2008-05-21	Romania	15	7	Tilburg	2008 FIRA	
21	2008-05-23	Germany	15	19	Amsterdam	2008 FIRA	
22	2009-05-17	Netherlands	0	100	Körsangens IP, Enköping	2009 FIRA Trophy	
23	2009-05-20	Scotland	0	71	Kristinebergs IP, Stockholm	2009 FIRA Trophy	
24	2009-05-23	Russia	11	29	Körsangens IP, Enköping	2009 FIRA Trophy	

=== 2010s ===
Test	Date	Opponent	PF	PA	Venue	Event	Ref
25	2010-05-10	Netherlands	0	74	Stade du Parc de Londres, Verdun	2010 FIRA	
26	2010-05-12	Spain	0	66	Stade de la Grange aux Bois, Metz	2010 FIRA	
27	2010-05-15	Germany	5	5	Centre Sportif de Hautepierre, Strasbourg	2010 FIRA	
28	2011-09-04	Switzerland	7	15	Brussels	Test	
29	2013-04-13	Switzerland	25	5	Colovray Sports Centre, Nyon	Test	
30	2014-10-30	Russia	29	7	Stade du Pachy, Waterloo	2014 RET	
31	2014-11-02	Netherlands	3	12	Stade du Pachy, Waterloo	2014 RET	
32	2015-10-29	Czech Republic	20	3	Sportanlage Schönenbüel, Unterägeri	2015 RET	
33	2015-11-01	Switzerland	50	20	Sportanlage Schönenbüel, Unterägeri	2015 RET	
34	2016-10-06	Spain	0	76	Campo Central CIU, Madrid	2016 REC	
35	2016-10-12	Czech Republic	20	5	Campo Central CIU, Madrid	2016 REC	
36	2016-10-15	Russia	5	74	Campo Central CIU, Madrid	2016 REC	
37	2018-02-27	Netherlands	12	84	Stade du Pachy, Waterloo	2018 REC	
38	2018-03-02	Germany	5	24	Petit Heysel, Brussels	2018 REC	

=== 2020s ===
Test	Date	Opponent	PF	PA	Venue	Event	Ref
39	2021-12-04	Portugal	8	10	CAR Jamor, Oeiras	2021–22 Europe Trophy	
40	2022-06-18	Netherlands	5	57	Sportpark Rijnvliet, Utrecht	Test	
41	2022-10-22	Portugal	5	71	Nelson Mandela Stadium, Brussels	2022–23 Europe Trophy	
42	2022-11-19	Czech Republic	21	29	Markéta Stadium, Prague	2022–23 Europe Trophy	
43	2023-03-04	Germany	10	14	Nelson Mandela Stadium, Brussels	2022–23 Europe Trophy	
44	2025-03-08	Germany	23	19	Fritz-Grunebaum-Sportpark, Heidelberg	2024–25 Europe Trophy	
45	2025-04-05	Finland	44	13	Stade du Pachy, Waterloo	2024–25 Europe Trophy	
46	2026-03-28	Spain	0	39	Campo Central CIU, Madrid	2026 REC	
47	2026-04-11	Netherlands	0	41	Sportcomplex Sint-Gillis, Dendermonde	2026 REC	
48	2026-04-18	Portugal	15	5	Sportcomplex Sint-Gillis, Dendermonde	2026 REC	

== Other matches ==
Date	Opponent	PF	PA	Venue	Event
2004-02-06	Netherlands B	0	56	Ghent, Belgium	
2005-02-16	Netherlands Devp.	5	0	Visé, Belgium	
2006-03-25	Netherlands B	13	0	Brussels, Belgium	
2007-04-15	(France) French Universities	7	13	Boisfort RC, Brussels, Belgium	2007 FIRA
2008-05-19	France Defence	0	5	Castricum, Netherlands	2008 FIRA
2008-11-09	French Flanders	5	0	Dour, Belgium	
2009-11-11	French Flanders	24	19	Flanders, France	
2010-04-25	French Flanders	22	0	Dour, Belgium	
2010-05-08	France A	0	70	Longwy, France	2010 FIRA
2012-03-17	German XV	14	21	Offenbach am Main, Frankfurt	
2012-07-04	France Defence	17	05	Brussels	
2013-02-02	France Defence	14	13	Stade Porchefontaine, Versailles	
2025-11-19	Germany	23	0	Fritz-Grunebaum-Sportpark, Heidelberg	3-Länder-Cup
2025-11-22	Hong Kong China XVs Select	7	15	Fritz-Grunebaum-Sportpark, Heidelberg	3-Länder-Cup
