= List of Russia women's national rugby union team matches =

The following is a list of Russia women's national rugby union team international matches.

== Overall ==
Russia's overall international match record against all nations is as follows:

	Games played	Won	Drawn	Lost	Percentage of wins
Total	50	24	0	26	48.00%

== Full internationals ==
=== Legend ===
Won	Lost	Draw

=== 1990s ===
Test	Date	Opponent	F	A	Winner	Venue	Tournament
1	1994-04-11	England	0	66	England	Boroughmuir	1994 RWC
2	1994-04-13	Scotland	0	51	Scotland	Boroughmuir	1994 RWC
3	1994-04-17	Sweden	13	20	Sweden	Kirkcaldy	1994 RWC
4	1994-04-19	Kazakhstan	0	25	Kazakhstan	Gala	1994 RWC
5	1997	Kazakhstan	7	5	Russia	Unknown	
6	1997	Kazakhstan	15	0	Russia	Unknown	
7	1997	Kazakhstan	35	12	Russia	Unknown	
8	1997	Spain	12	17	Spain	Unknown	
9	1998-05-02	United States	0	84	United States	Amsterdam	1998 RWC
10	1998-05-05	Wales	7	83	Wales	Amsterdam	1998 RWC
11	1998-05-09	Italy	7	51	Italy	Amsterdam	1998 RWC
12	1998-05-12	Netherlands	0	61	Netherlands	Amsterdam	1998 RWC
13	1998-05-15	Sweden	3	23	Sweden	Amsterdam	1998 RWC

=== 2000s ===
Test	Date	Opponent	F	A	Winner	Venue	Tournament
14	2005-05-21	Norway	25	0	Russia	Zenica, Bosnia	2005 FIRA
15	2005-05-21	Bosnia and Herzegovina	74	0	Russia	Zenica, Bosnia	2005 FIRA
16	2005-05-23	Norway	49	0	Russia	Zenica, Bosnia	2005 FIRA
17	2005-05-23	Bosnia and Herzegovina	65	0	Russia	Zenica, Bosnia	2005 FIRA
18	2006-04-23	Belgium	24	0	Russia	San Donà di Piave, Italy	2006 ENC
19	2006-04-23	Italy	0	30	Italy	San Donà di Piave, Italy	2006 ENC
20	2006-04-26	Netherlands	5	53	Netherlands	San Donà di Piave, Italy	2006 ENC
21	2006-04-30	Norway	62	5	Russia	San Donà di Piave, Italy	2006 ENC
22	2007-04-28	England	0	62	England	Barcelona, Spain	2007 FIRA
23	2007-04-30	Spain	3	54	Spain	Barcelona, Spain	2007 FIRA
24	2007-05-02	Italy	5	50	Italy	Barcelona, Spain	2007 FIRA
25	2007-05-05	Wales	14	38	Wales	Barcelona, Spain	2007 FIRA
26	2008-05-19	Finland	39	0	Russia	Utrecht, Netherlands	2008 FIRA
27	2008-05-19	Romania	32	3	Russia	Utrecht, Netherlands	2008 FIRA
28	2008-05-21	Belgium	22	0	Russia	Tilburg, Netherlands	2008 FIRA
29	2008-05-21	Romania	29	0	Russia	Tilburg, Netherlands	2008 FIRA
30	2009-05-17	Scotland	0	84	Scotland	Enköping, Sweden	
31	2009-05-20	Netherlands	0	34	Netherlands	Stockholm, Sweden	
32	2009-05-23	Belgium	29	11	Russia	Enköping, Sweden	

=== 2010s ===
Test	Date	Opponent	F	A	Winner	Venue	Tournament
33	2010-05-08	Sweden	0	32	Sweden	Sélestat	2010 FIRA
34	2010-05-10	Italy	0	33	Italy	Colmar	2010 FIRA
35	2010-05-12	Germany	17	14	Russia	Haguenau	2010 FIRA
36	2011-04-30	Netherlands	17	10	Russia	INEF Bastiagueiro	2011 FIRA
37	2011-05-07	Finland	22	5	Russia	INEF Bastiagueiro	2011 FIRA
38	2012-05-03	Sweden	0	67	Sweden	Enkoping, Sweden	2012 FIRA
39	2012-05-07	Finland	45	17	Russia	Enkoping, Sweden	2012 FIRA
40	2014-10-30	Belgium	7	29	Belgium	Brussels, Belgium	2014 RET
41	2014-11-02	Switzerland	31	24	Russia	Brussels, Belgium	2014 RET
42	2015-10-29	Switzerland	12	27	Switzerland	Unterägeri, Switzerland	2015 RET
43	2015-11-01	Czech Republic	41	15	Russia	Unterägeri, Switzerland	2015 RET
44	2016-10-09	Netherlands	17	22	Netherlands	Estadio Nacional Complutense, Madrid	WCQ
45	2016-10-12	Switzerland	52	0	Russia	Estadio Nacional Complutense, Madrid	WCQ
46	2016-10-15	Belgium	74	5	Russia	Estadio Nacional Complutense, Madrid	WCQ

=== 2020s ===
Test	Date	Opponent	F	A	Winner	Venue	Tournament
47	2020-03-07	Netherlands	27	21	Russia	Amsterdam	2020 REC
48	2021-03-20	Spain	7	56	Spain	Estadio Pedro Escartín, Guadalajara, Spain	2020 REC
49	2022-02-26	Spain	0	27	Spain	Campo de Rugby Las Terrazas, Madrid	2022 REC

== Other matches ==
Date	Opponent	F	A	Winner	Venue	Tournament
1994-04-21	(Scotland) Scottish Students	24	12	Russia	Stirling County	1994 RWC
2008-05-23	France Defence	31	14	Russia	Amsterdam	2008 FIRA
2010-05-15	France A	0	35	France A	Stade de la Meinau, Strasbourg	2010 FIRA
2011-05-02	Italy A	0	34	Italy A	Fortecarmoa, Vilagarcía	2011 FIRA
2011-05-04	England A	0	39	England A	Fortecarmoa, Vilagarcía	2011 FIRA
