= List of Sweden women's national rugby union team matches =

The following is a list of Sweden women's national rugby union team international matches.

== Overall ==
Sweden's overall international match record against all nations, updated to 25 October 2025, is as follows:

| | Games Played | Won | Drawn | Lost | Percentage of wins |
| Total | 94 | 35 | 0 | 59 | 37.23% |

== Full internationals ==
=== Legend ===
| Won | Lost | Draw |

=== 1980s ===
| Test | Date | Opponent | PF | PA | Venue | Event |
|---|---|---|---|---|---|---|
| 1 | 1984-10-21 | Netherlands | 0 | 34 | Malmö, Sweden | First international |
| 2 | 1985-10-19 | Netherlands | 0 | 19 | Nijmegen, Netherlands | |
| 3 | 1986-10-17 | Netherlands | 6 | 11 | Castricum, Netherlands | |
| 4 | 1986-12-31 | Belgium | 32 | 0 | Brussels | |
| 5 | 1988-10-15 | England | 0 | 40 | Waterloo, England | |
| 6 | 1989-10-14 | West Germany | 8 | 0 | Berlin | |

=== 1990s ===
| Test | Date | Opponent | PF | PA | Venue | Event |
|---|---|---|---|---|---|---|
| 7 | 1991-04-08 | France | 0 | 37 | Glamorgan Wanderers, Wales | 1991 RWC |
| 8 | 1991-04-10 | Japan | 20 | 0 | Llanharan | 1991 RWC |
| 9 | 1991-04-11 | Italy | 0 | 18 | Cardiff | 1991 RWC |
| 10 | 1991-11-09 | Germany | 20 | 10 | Trelleborg | |
| 11 | 1994-04-11 | United States | 0 | 111 | Melrose | 1994 RWC |
| 12 | 1994-04-13 | Japan | 5 | 10 | Melrose | 1994 RWC |
| 13 | 1994-04-17 | Russia | 20 | 13 | Kirkcaldy | 1994 RWC |
| 14 | 1994-04-21 | Kazakhstan | 12 | 31 | Stirling County | 1994 RWC |
| 15 | 1994-04-23 | Kazakhstan | 12 | 29 | Boroughmuir | 1994 RWC |
| 16 | 1994-04-24 | Scotland | 0 | 60 | Meggetland | |
| 17 | 1994-11-19 | Germany | 0 | 12 | Hamburg | |
| 18 | 1997-08-05 | Scotland | 0 | 42 | Stockholm | |
| 19 | 1998-05-02 | England | 0 | 75 | Amsterdam, Netherlands | 1998 RWC |
| 20 | 1998-05-05 | Netherlands | 0 | 44 | Amsterdam, Netherlands | 1998 RWC |
| 21 | 1998-05-09 | Kazakhstan | 5 | 47 | Amsterdam, Netherlands | 1998 RWC |
| 22 | 1998-05-12 | Germany | 18 | 20 | Amsterdam, Netherlands | 1998 RWC |
| 23 | 1998-05-15 | Russia | 23 | 3 | Amsterdam, Netherlands | 1998 RWC |

=== 2000s ===
| Test | Date | Opponent | PF | PA | Venue | Event |
|---|---|---|---|---|---|---|
| 24 | 2000-08-12 | Germany | 30 | 5 | Hanover | |
| 25 | 2001-05-07 | Germany | 15 | 13 | Villeneuve d' Ascq, France | 2001 FIRA |
| 26 | 2001-05-09 | Belgium | 90 | 0 | Lille, France | 2001 FIRA |
| 27 | 2001-05-12 | Netherlands | 13 | 12 | Lille, France | 2001 FIRA |
| 28 | 2001-11-11 | Scotland | 3 | 13 | Edinburgh | |
| 29 | 2002-03-20 | Netherlands | 22 | 0 | Treviso, Italy | 2002 ENC |
| 30 | 2002-03-23 | Italy | 24 | 35 | Treviso, Italy | 2002 ENC |
| 31 | 2002-11-24 | Scotland | 3 | 34 | Murrayfield, Edinburgh | |
| 32 | 2003-05-01 | France | 0 | 9 | Malmö, Sweden | 2003 FIRA |
| 33 | 2003-05-03 | Italy | 15 | 10 | Malmö, Sweden | 2003 FIRA |
| 34 | 2003-07-06 | Scotland | 5 | 49 | Linköping | |
| 35 | 2004-05-02 | Scotland | 0 | 32 | Toulouse, France | 2004 FIRA |
| 36 | 2004-05-05 | Spain | 5 | 31 | Toulouse, France | 2004 FIRA |
| 37 | 2004-05-08 | Italy | 0 | 13 | Toulouse, France | 2004 FIRA |
| 38 | 2005-04-07 | Netherlands | 7 | 8 | Hamburg, Germany | 2005 FIRA |
| 39 | 2005-04-09 | Germany | 17 | 5 | Hamburg, Germany | 2005 FIRA |
| 40 | 2006-04-23 | Norway | 34 | 0 | San Dona Di Piave, Italy | 2006 ENC |
| 41 | 2006-04-23 | Netherlands | 5 | 10 | San Dona Di Piave, Italy | 2006 ENC |
| 42 | 2006-04-26 | Italy | 0 | 33 | San Dona Di Piave, Italy | 2006 ENC |
| 43 | 2006-04-30 | Belgium | 32 | 0 | San Dona Di Piave, Italy | 2006 ENC |
| 44 | 2007-04-28 | France | 0 | 12 | Barcelona, Spain | 2007 FIRA |
| 45 | 2007-04-30 | Wales | 18 | 8 | Barcelona, Spain | 2007 FIRA |
| 46 | 2007-05-02 | Netherlands | 5 | 20 | Barcelona, Spain | 2007 FIRA |
| 47 | 2007-05-05 | Italy | 6 | 0 | Barcelona, Spain | 2007 FIRA |
| 48 | 2008-05-17 | England | 3 | 80 | Amsterdam | 2008 FIRA |
| 49 | 2008-05-20 | Spain | 0 | 20 | Drachten, Netherlands | 2008 FIRA |
| 50 | 2008-05-24 | Netherlands | 6 | 7 | Amsterdam | 2008 FIRA |
| 51 | 2008-11-02 | Germany | 5 | 12 | Hanover | |
| 52 | 2009-01-10 | Scotland | 0 | 32 | Meggetland | |
| 53 | 2009-04-25 | Netherlands | 0 | 24 | Norrköping | |
| 54 | 2009-04-26 | Netherlands | 3 | 7 | Norrköping | |
| 55 | 2009-05-17 | Italy | 16 | 14 | Stockholm | 2009 FIRA |
| 56 | 2009-05-20 | Spain | 11 | 6 | Enköping | 2009 FIRA |
| 57 | 2009-05-23 | Germany | 38 | 6 | Stockholm | 2009 FIRA |
| 58 | 2009-11-28 | Wales | 7 | 56 | St Helen's, Swansea | |

=== 2010s ===
| Test | Date | Opponent | PF | PA | Venue | Event |
|---|---|---|---|---|---|---|
| 59 | 2010-04-02 | Netherlands | 0 | 19 | Leiden | |
| 60 | 2010-04-04 | Netherlands | 7 | 20 | Amsterdam | |
| 61 | 2010-05-08 | Russia | 32 | 0 | Sélestat | 2010 FIRA |
| 62 | 2010-05-10 | Germany | 29 | 0 | Colmar | 2010 FIRA |
| 63 | 2010-05-12 | Italy | 0 | 10 | Haguenau | 2010 FIRA |
| 64 | 2010-05-15 | Netherlands | 19 | 47 | Illkirch-Graffenstaden | 2010 FIRA |
| 65 | 2010-08-20 | France | 9 | 15 | Surrey Sports Park, Guildford, England | 2010 RWC |
| 66 | 2010-08-24 | Canada | 10 | 40 | Surrey Sports Park, Guildford, England | 2010 RWC |
| 67 | 2010-08-28 | Scotland | 5 | 32 | Surrey Sports Park, Guildford, England | 2010 RWC |
| 68 | 2010-09-01 | Wales | 10 | 32 | Surrey Sports Park, Guildford, England | 2010 RWC |
| 69 | 2010-09-05 | Kazakhstan | 12 | 8 | Surrey Sports Park, Guildford, England | 2010 RWC |
| 70 | 2011-05-02 | Finland | 20 | 0 | A Malata Ferrol | 2011 FIRA |
| 71 | 2011-05-04 | Spain | 3 | 18 | University of Coruña | 2011 FIRA |
| 72 | 2011-05-07 | Netherlands | 5 | 21 | INEF (Bastiagueiro) | 2011 FIRA |
| 73 | 2012-05-03 | Russia | 67 | 0 | Enkoping, Sweden | 2012 FIRA |
| 74 | 2012-05-07 | Netherlands | 10 | 3 | Enkoping, Sweden | 2012 FIRA |
| 75 | 2013-04-20 | Spain | 0 | 55 | Madrid | RWCQ |
| 76 | 2013-04-27 | Samoa | 0 | 29 | Madrid | RWCQ |
| 77 | 2013-04-27 | Scotland | 8 | 63 | Madrid | RWCQ |
| 78 | 2014-10-18 | Netherlands | 3 | 10 | Malmö | |
| 79 | 2017-10-21 | Finland | 39 | 10 | Eerikkilä Areena, Tammela | |
| 80 | 2019-11-02 | Finland | 19 | 7 | Malmö, Sweden | 2019–20 RET |
| 81 | 2019-11-16 | Czech Republic | 5 | 17 | Prague, Czech Republic | 2019–20 RET |

=== 2021–24 ===
| Test | Date | Opponent | PF | PA | Venue | Event |
|---|---|---|---|---|---|---|
| 82 | 2021-10-16 | Finland | 24 | 10 | Helsinki, Finland | 2021–22 RET |
| 83 | 2021-10-30 | Czech Republic | 31 | 12 | Norrköping, Sweden | 2021–22 RET |
| 84 | 2022-03-12 | Switzerland | 48 | 0 | Centre Sportif des Cherpines, Switzerland | 2021–22 RET |
| 85 | 2022-11-26 | Portugal | 7 | 5 | CAR Rugby do Jamor, Oeiras | |
| 86 | 2023-02-11 | Netherlands | 12 | 38 | National Rugby Center, Amsterdam | 2023 REC |
| 87 | 2023-02-25 | Spain | 5 | 90 | Campo del Pantano, Villajoyosa | 2023 REC |
| 88 | 2024-02-04 | Netherlands | 0 | 59 | National Rugby Center | 2024 REC |
| 89 | 2024-03-09 | Portugal | 0 | 27 | CAR Jamor | 2024 REC |
| 90 | 2024-04-13 | Spain | 0 | 53 | Trelleborg | 2024 REC |

=== 2025–26 ===
| Test | Date | Opponent | PF | PA | Venue | Event |
|---|---|---|---|---|---|---|
| 91 | 2025-04-05 | Spain | 0 | 69 | Camp Municipal El Vergeret, Tavernes de la Valldigna | 2025 REC |
| 92 | 2025-04-12 | Portugal | 3 | 38 | Trelleborg Rugby Arena, Trelleborg | 2025 REC |
| 93 | 2025-04-19 | Netherlands | 3 | 90 | Trelleborg Rugby Arena, Trelleborg | 2025 REC |
| 94 | 2025-10-25 | Finland | 18 | 7 | Ruutisavu Areena, Vantaa | 2025–26 RET |
| 95 | 2026-04-04 | Germany | TBD | TBD | Trelleborg Rugby Arena, Trelleborg | 2025–26 RET |

== Other matches ==
| Date | Sweden | PF | PA | Opponents | Venue | Event |
|---|---|---|---|---|---|---|
| 1994-04-19 | Sweden | 14 | 12 | (Scotland) Scottish Students | Gala | 1994 RWC |
| 2003-05-03 | Sweden A | 37 | 0 | Denmark | Copenhagen | |
| 2003-11-02 | Sweden | 27 | 5 | Norwegian Barbarians | Copenhagen | |
| 2006-04-14 | Sweden | 5 | 35 | England Select XV | RAF Halton | |
| 2006-04-16 | Sweden | 10 | 15 | England Student XV | RAF Halton | |
| 2009-04-12 | Sweden | 15 | 13 | Welsh Invitational XV | Sardis Road, Pontypridd | |
| 2009-05-22 | Sweden A | 16 | 19 | Finland | Södertälje | |
| 2011-04-30 | Sweden | 3 | 40 | France A | INEF Bastiagueiro | 2011 FIRA |
