= List of Switzerland women's national rugby union team matches =

The following is a list of Switzerland women's national rugby union team matches.

== Full internationals ==
=== Legend ===
Won	Lost	Draw

=== 2010s ===
Test#	Date	Switzerland	Score	Opponent	Venue	Event	Ref
1	2011-09-04	Switzerland	15–7	Belgium	Brussels	Test	
2	2012-10-06	Switzerland	15–5	Finland	Myllypuro Sports Park, Helsinki	Test	
3	2013-04-13	Switzerland	5–25	Belgium	Colovray Sports Centre, Nyon	Test	
4	2013-06-29	Switzerland	27–15	Czech Republic	Stadion ragby Císarka, Prague	Test	
5	2013-11-16	Switzerland	42–0	Czech Republic	Colovray Sports Centre, Nyon	Test	
6	2014-03-08	Switzerland	80–0	Finland	Sportanlage Schönenbüel, Unterägeri	Test	
7	2014-06-29	Switzerland	32–3	Czech Republic	Ragbyove hřiště v Edenu, Prague	2014 Europe Trophy	
8	2014-10-30	Switzerland	0–39	Netherlands	Stade du Pachy, Waterloo	2014 Europe Trophy	
9	2014-11-02	Switzerland	24–31	Russia	Brussels	2014 Europe Trophy	
10	2015-10-29	Switzerland	27–12	Russia	Sportanlage Schönenbüel, Unterägeri	2015 Europe Trophy	
11	2015-11-01	Switzerland	20–50	Belgium	Sportanlage Schönenbüel, Unterägeri	2015 Europe Trophy	
12	2016-08-21	Switzerland	0–36	Germany	Sportgelände an der Speyererstraße, Heidelberg	Test	
13	2016-10-06	Switzerland	0–55	Netherlands	Campo Central CIU, Madrid	2016 Europe Championship	
14	2016-10-12	Switzerland	0–51	Russia	Campo Central CIU, Madrid	2016 Europe Championship	
15	2016-10-15	Switzerland	24–12	Czech Republic	Campo Central CIU, Madrid	2016 Europe Championship	
16	2017-09-10	Switzerland	0–29	Germany	Sportplatz Allmannsdorf, Konstanz	Test	
17	2018-10-13	Switzerland	20–5	Finland	Myllypuro Sports Park, Helsinki	2018–19 Europe Trophy	
18	2018-11-17	Switzerland	5–10	Czech Republic	Stade Municipal, Yverdon-les-Bains	2018–19 Europe Trophy	
19	2019-11-09	Switzerland	5–15	Czech Republic	Areálu Ondřeje Sekory, Brno	2019–20 Europe Trophy	
20	2019-11-23	Switzerland	32–0	Finland	Stade Municipal, Yverdon-les-Bains	2019–20 Europe Trophy	

=== 2020s ===
Test#	Date	Switzerland	Score	Opponent	Venue	Event	Ref
21	2021-11-13	Switzerland	0–27	Czech Republic	Colovray Sports Centre, Nyon	2021–22 Europe Trophy	
22	2022-03-12	Switzerland	0–48	Sweden	Centre Sportif des Cherpines, Plan-les-Ouates	2021–22 Europe Trophy	
23	2022-05-28	Switzerland	0–80	Finland	Hamarin Sports Ground, Porvoo	2021–22 Europe Trophy	
24	2026-02-22	Switzerland	13–20	Germany	Yverdon, Switzerland, Yverdon	Test match	

== Other matches ==
2009-09-12

Illkirch-Sélestat	15-5	Switzerland

Sélestat

2010-03-20

Monza	17-7	Switzerland

Bellinzona

2010-04-03

FRF	0-91	Switzerland

Gent

2010-04-03

Romford Ravens	0-77	Switzerland

Gent

2010-04-03

RFC Gent	0-7	Switzerland

Gent

2010-04-04

Romford Ravens	0-70	Switzerland

Gent

2010-04-04

RFC Gent	0-14	Switzerland

Gent
