= List of Germany women's national rugby union team matches =

The following is a list of Germany women's national rugby union team international matches.

== Overall ==
Germany's overall international match record against all nations, updated to 28 February 2026, is as follows:

	Games played	Won	Drawn	Lost	Percentage of wins
Total	78	26	0	52	33.33%

== Full internationals ==
=== Legend ===
Won	Lost	Draw

=== 1989 ===
Test	Date	Opponent	PF	PA	Venue	Event
1	1989-10-14	Sweden	0	8	Berlin	competed as West Germany

=== 1991–99 ===
Test	Date	Opponent	PF	PA	Venue	Event
2	1991-11-09	Sweden	10	20	Trelleborg	
3	1992-10-17	Netherlands	0	39	Hanover	
4	1993-10-10	Netherlands	0	53	Delft	
5	1993-10-31	Kazakhstan	11	10	Hanover	
6	1994-11-19	Sweden	12	0	Hamburg	
7	1994-11-28	Kazakhstan	3	15	Hanover	
8	1995-05-14	Portugal	50	0	Heidelberg	
9	1996-04-10	Spain	0	53	Madrid	1996 FIRA
10	1996-04-11	Netherlands	11	29	Madrid	1996 FIRA
11	1996-04-13	Italy	0	39	Madrid	1996 FIRA
12	1996-08-24	Kazakhstan	3	53	Hanover	
13	1997-04-02	France	18	58	Nice, France	1997 FIRA
14	1997-04-04	Netherlands	10	32	Nice, France	1997 FIRA
15	1997-04-06	Ireland	0	16	Nice, France	1997 FIRA
16	1997-08-31	England	0	84	Hürth	
17	1997-10-26	Netherlands	7	31	Amsterdam	
18	1997-11-09	Ireland	6	32	Hamburg	
19	1998-05-02	New Zealand	6	134	Amsterdam	1998 RWC
20	1998-05-05	Italy	5	34	Amsterdam	1998 RWC
21	1998-05-09	Wales	12	55	Amsterdam	1998 RWC
22	1998-05-12	Sweden	20	18	Amsterdam	1998 RWC
23	1998-05-15	Netherlands	3	67	Amsterdam	1998 RWC
24	1999-04-09	Netherlands	12	19	Hanover	
25	1999-04-11	Kazakhstan	6	34	Hanover	

=== 2000–09 ===
Test	Date	Opponent	PF	PA	Venue	Event
26	2000-05-08	Netherlands	5	12	El Ejido, Spain	2000 FIRA
27	2000-05-10	Netherlands	0	7	Roquetas, Spain	2000 FIRA
28	2000-05-13	Italy	5	27	Roquetas, Spain	2000 FIRA
29	2000-08-12	Sweden	5	30	Hanover	
30	2001-05-07	Sweden	13	15	Villeneuve d' Ascq, France	2001 FIRA
31	2001-05-09	Netherlands	6	17	Lille, France	2001 FIRA
32	2001-05-12	Belgium	67	0	Lille, France	2001 FIRA
33	2002-03-20	Italy	0	16	San Donà	2002 FIRA
34	2002-03-23	Netherlands	12	10	Treviso	2002 FIRA
35	2002-05-13	New Zealand	0	117	Barcelona	2002 RWC
36	2002-05-17	Wales	0	77	Barcelona	2002 RWC
37	2002-05-20	Ireland	0	18	Barcelona	2002 RWC
38	2002-05-24	Netherlands	19	20	Barcelona	2002 RWC
39	2003-05-08	Norway	75	0	Amsterdam, Netherlands	2003 FIRA
40	2003-05-11	Netherlands	12	19	Amsterdam, Netherlands	2003 FIRA
41	2004-05-02	Norway	67	0	Toulouse, France	2004 FIRA
42	2004-05-05	Denmark	47	0	Toulouse, France	2004 FIRA
43	2004-05-08	Netherlands	0	30	Toulouse, France	2004 FIRA
44	2005-04-07	Italy	0	52	Hamburg, Germany	2005 FIRA
45	2005-04-09	Sweden	5	17	Hamburg, Germany	2005 FIRA
46	2007-04-12	Norway	48	0	Kituro (Brussels), Belgium	2007 FIRA
47	2007-04-13	Finland	32	0	Liège, Belgium	2007 FIRA
48	2007-04-15	Romania	15	0	Boisfort, Belgium	2007 FIRA
49	2007-10-28	Luxembourg	37	0	Heidelberg	
50	2008-03-16	Netherlands	0	43	Aachen	
51	2008-04-20	Netherlands	10	50	Valkenswaard	
52	2008-05-19	Belgium	5	0	Castricum, Netherlands	2008 FIRA
53	2008-05-21	Finland	39	3	Driebergen, Netherlands	2008 FIRA
54	2008-05-23	Belgium	19	15	Amsterdam	2008 FIRA
55	2008-11-02	Sweden	12	5	Hanover	
56	2009-05-17	Spain	0	74	Stockholm, Sweden	2009 FIRA
57	2009-05-20	Italy	0	47	Enköping, Sweden	2009 FIRA
58	2009-05-23	Sweden	6	38	Stockholm	2009 FIRA

=== 2010–19 ===
Test	Date	Opponent	PF	PA	Venue	Event
59	2010-04-18	Netherlands	0	83	Maastricht	
60	2010-05-08	Italy	0	43	Sélestat	2010 FIRA
61	2010-05-10	Sweden	0	29	Colmar	2010 FIRA
62	2010-05-12	Russia	14	17	Haguenau	2010 FIRA
63	2010-05-15	Belgium	5	5	Centre sportif de Hautepierre, Strasbourg	2010 FIRA
64	2016-08-21	Switzerland	36	0	Heidelberg	
65	2017-09-10	Switzerland	29	0	Sportplatz Almmannsdorf, Konstanz	
66	2018-02-27	Spain	0	44	Waterloo, Belgium	2018 REC
67	2018-03-02	Belgium	24	5	Waterloo, Belgium	2018 REC
68	2018-10-28	Czech Republic	25	0	Berlin	
69	2019-03-09	Netherlands	17	46	Amsterdam, Netherlands	
70	2019-05-04	Russia	5	22	Bonn, Germany	

=== 2022–26 ===
Test	Date	Opponent	PF	PA	Venue	Event
71	2022-04-30	Portugal	0	57	Car Jamor, Lisbon, Portugal	2021–22 RET
72	2022-10-22	Finland	5	43	Myllypuro Sports Park, Helsinki	2022–23 RET
73	2022-11-05	Czech Republic	12	10	Rugby Center, Hürth	2022–23 RET
74	2023-03-04	Belgium	14	10	Nelson Mandela Stadium, Brussels	2022–23 RET
75	2023-04-15	Portugal	5	20	Rugby Center, Hürth	2022–23 RET
76	2024-10-19	Finland	44	10	Hakunila Sports Park, Vantaa	2024–25 RET
77	2025-03-08	Belgium	19	23	Fritz-Grunebaum-Sportpark, Heidelberg	2024–25 RET
78	2026-02-28	Finland	68	0	Fritz-Grunebaum-Sportpark, Heidelberg	2025–26 RET
79	2026-04-04	Sweden	TBD	TBD	Trelleborg Rugby Arena, Trelleborg	2025–26 RET

== Other matches ==
Date	Germany	F	A	Opponent	Venue	Event
1995-05-06	Germany	3	75	Catalonia	Rottweil	
2000-05-08	Germany	6	8	(Flanders) Flandre	El Ejido, Spain	2000 FIRA
2000-05-10	Germany	5	0	(Flanders) Flandre	El Ejido, Spain	2000 FIRA
2007-04-11	Germany	14	19	(France) French Universities	Leuven, Belgium	2007 FIRA
2007-10-28	Germany A	63	0	Luxembourg A	Heidelberg, Germany	
2008-05-19	Germany	5	17	(France) French Defence	Castricum, Netherlands	2008 FIRA
2008-05-21	Germany	7	10	(France) French Defence	Driebergen, Netherlands	2008 FIRA
2008-10-05	Germany	22	5	Switzerland	Heidelberg, Germany	
2009-11-08	Eastern Germany	0	40	Czech Republic	Tatry Smíchov, Prague	
2012-03-17	German XV	21	14	Belgium	Offenbach am Main, Frankfurt	
2025-11-15	Germany	10	12	Hong Kong China XVs Select	Fritz-Grunebaum-Sportpark, Heidelberg	3-Länder-Cup
2025-11-19	Germany	0	23	Belgium	Fritz-Grunebaum-Sportpark, Heidelberg	3-Länder-Cup
