= List of Spain women's national rugby union team matches =

The following is a list of Spain women's national rugby union team international matches.

== Full internationals ==
Won	Lost	Draw

=== 1989–1995 ===
Test	Date	Opponent	PF	PA	Venue	Event	Ref
1	2 May 1989	France	0	20	Unknown	Test	
2	6 April 1991	England	0	12	St Helen's Ground, Swansea	1991 World Cup	
3	10 April 1991	Italy	13	7	Memorial Ground, Cardiff	1991 World Cup	
4	11 April 1991	Japan	32	0	Cardiff Arms Park, Cardiff	1991 World Cup	
5	12 April 1991	Netherlands	8	0	Cardiff Arms Park, Cardiff	1991 World Cup	
6	13 April 1991	Canada	4	19	Memorial Ground, Cardiff	1991 World Cup	
7	13 June 1992	France	10	14	Agen	Test	
8	14 May 1994	Italy	0	3	Ciudad Deportiva, Getafe	Test	
9	12 April 1995	Italy	5	0	Treviso	1995 FIRA Championship	
10	16 April 1995	France	22	6	Treviso	1995 FIRA Championship	

=== 1996–1997 ===
Test	Date	Opponent	PF	PA	Venue	Event	Ref
11	7 January 1996	England	7	5	London	Test	
12	10 April 1996	Germany	53	0	Madrid	1996 FIRA Championship	
13	12 April 1996	Netherlands	29	0	Madrid	1996 FIRA Championship	
14	14 April 1996	France	10	15	Madrid	1996 FIRA Championship	
15	5 January 1997	England	15	17	Leeds	Test	
16	2 April 1997	Ireland	27	0	Nice	1997 FIRA Championship	
17	4 April 1997	Scotland	10	11	Nice	1997 FIRA Championship	
18	6 April 1997	France	25	8	Nice	1997 FIRA Championship	
19	7 December 1997	England	15	15	Toledo	Test	

=== 1998–1999 ===
Test	Date	Opponent	PF	PA	Venue	Event	Ref
20	15 February 1998	Netherlands	29	5	Amsterdam	Test	
21	15 February 1998	Kazakhstan	29	3	Estadi De Rugby, L'Hospitalet de Llobregat	Test	
22	2 May 1998	Wales	28	18	National Rugby Center, Amsterdam	1998 World Cup	
23	5 May 1998	United States	16	38	National Rugby Center, Amsterdam	1998 World Cup	
24	9 May 1998	New Zealand	3	46	National Rugby Center, Amsterdam	1998 World Cup	
25	12 May 1998	Australia	15	17	National Rugby Center, Amsterdam	1998 World Cup	
26	16 May 1998	France	22	9	National Rugby Center, Amsterdam	1998 World Cup	
27	5 December 1998	Scotland	3	5	Madrid	Test	
28	19 April 1999	Wales	14	8	Belluno	1999 FIRA	
29	21 April 1999	Scotland	11	9	Belluno	1999 FIRA	
30	24 April 1999	France	5	13	Belluno	1999 FIRA	

=== 2000 ===
Test	Date	Opponent	PF	PA	Venue	Event	Ref
31	9 January 2000	England	10	41	Barcelona	Test	
32	6 February 2000	England	7	31	Banbury	2000 Five Nations	
33	18 February 2000	Scotland	13	9	Murcia	2000 Five Nations	
34	18 March 2000	France	5	38	Dax	2000 Five Nations	
35	1 April 2000	Wales	18	10	Majadahonda	2000 Five Nations	
36	8 May 2000	Italy	58	16	Roquetas de Mar	2000 FIRA Championship	
37	10 May 2000	Scotland	13	10	Almería	2000 FIRA Championship	
38	13 May 2000	France	0	31	Almería	2000 FIRA Championship	

=== 2001 ===
Test	Date	Opponent	PF	PA	Venue	Event	Ref
39	9 February 2001	Ireland	42	0	Madrid	Test	
40	18 February 2001	England	12	28	Worcester	2001 Five Nations	
41	3 March 2001	France	6	0	Madrid	2001 Five Nations	
42	18 March 2001	Scotland	8	19	Greenyards, Melrose	2001 Five Nations	
43	8 April 2001	Wales	5	0	Wrexham	2001 Five Nations	
44	6 May 2001	Italy	34	3	Lille	2001 FIRA Championship	
45	10 May 2001	England	15	8	Roubaix	2001 FIRA Championship	
46	12 May 2001	Scotland	3	15	Stadium Lille Métropole	2001 FIRA Championship	

=== 2002 ===
Test	Date	Opponent	PF	PA	Venue	Event	Ref
47	4 January 2002	France	15	5	San Sebastián	Test	
48	2 February 2002	France	0	24	Bègles	2002 Six Nations	
49	16 February 2002	Scotland	14	17	Barcelona	2002 Six Nations	
50	2 March 2002	Wales	20	0	Madrid	2002 Six Nations	
51	25 March 2002	Ireland	8	6	Limerick	2002 Six Nations	
52	7 April 2002	England	14	53	Madrid	2002 Six Nations	
53	12 May 2002	Japan	62	0	Cornellà de Llobregat	2002 World Cup	
54	18 May 2002	England	5	13	Cornellà de Llobregat	2002 World Cup	
55	21 May 2002	Scotland	16	23	Cornellà de Llobregat	2002 World Cup	
56	25 May 2002	United States	5	23	Estadi Baldiri Aleu	2002 World Cup	

=== 2003 ===
Test	Date	Opponent	PF	PA	Venue	Event	Ref
57	15 February 2003	Wales	0	44	Cardiff Arms Park, Cardiff	2003 Six Nations	
58	22 February 2003	Ireland	0	16	Madrid	2003 Six Nations	
59	9 March 2003	England	0	69	Twickenham Stoop, London	2003 Six Nations	
60	22 March 2003	France	7	27	Girona	2003 Six Nations	
61	29 March 2003	Scotland	7	48	Meadowbank Stadium, Edinburgh	2003 Six Nations	
62	1 May 2003	Italy	29	5	Malmö	2003 FIRA Championship	
63	3 May 2003	France	16	10	Malmö	2003 FIRA Championship	

=== 2004 ===
Test	Date	Opponent	PF	PA	Venue	Event	Ref
64	15 February 2004	England	3	71	Pinares de Venecia, Zaragoza	2004 RBS 6 Nations	
65	21 February 2004	France	0	24	Perpignan	2004 RBS 6 Nations	
66	6 March 2004	Scotland	6	5	Lalín	2004 RBS 6 Nations	
67	20 March 2004	Ireland	8	7	Thomond Park, Limerick	2004 RBS 6 Nations	
68	27 March 2004	Wales	12	7	Cardiff Arms Park, Cardiff	2004 RBS 6 Nations	
69	1 May 2004	France	5	24	Castres	2004 FIRA Championship	
70	5 May 2004	Sweden	31	5	Quint-Fonsegrives	2004 FIRA Championship	
71	8 May 2004	Ireland	12	20	Lalande Aucamville, Toulouse	2004 FIRA Championship	

=== 2005 ===
Test	Date	Opponent	PF	PA	Venue	Event	Ref
72	5 February 2005	Ireland	19	17	Campo Central CIU, Madrid	2005 RBS 6 Nations	
73	12 February 2005	Wales	10	10	Ourense	2005 RBS 6 Nations	
74	26 February 2005	Scotland	3	19	New Anniesland, Glasgow	2005 RBS 6 Nations	
75	12 March 2005	England	0	76	Imber Court, London	2005 RBS 6 Nations	
76	19 March 2005	France	0	39	Sant Boi de Llobregat	2005 RBS 6 Nations	

=== 2006 ===
Test	Date	Opponent	PF	PA	Venue	Event	Ref
77	4 February 2006	Ireland	10	25	Energia Park, Dublin	2006 RBS 6 Nations	
78	11 February 2006	England	3	86	Campo Central CIU, Madrid	2006 RBS 6 Nations	
79	25 February 2006	France	0	38	Saint-Jean-de-Luz	2006 RBS 6 Nations	
80	10 March 2006	Wales	0	10	Sardis Road, Pontypridd	2006 RBS 6 Nations	
81	18 March 2006	Scotland	12	16	Campo Central CIU, Madrid	2006 RBS 6 Nations	
82	31 August 2006	Scotland	0	24	St. Albert Rugby Park, St. Albert	2006 World Cup	
83	4 September 2006	Canada	0	79	St. Albert Rugby Park, St. Albert	2006 World Cup	
84	8 September 2006	Samoa	14	12	Ellerslie Rugby Park, Edmonton	2006 World Cup	
85	12 September 2006	Kazakhstan	17	12	Ellerslie Rugby Park, Edmonton	2006 World Cup	
86	16 September 2006	Samoa	10	5	Ellerslie Rugby Park, Edmonton	2006 World Cup	

=== 2007–2009 ===
Test	Date	Opponent	PF	PA	Venue	Event	Ref
87	28 April 2007	Italy	15	6	Madrid	2007 FIRA Championship	
88	30 April 2007	Russia	54	3	Madrid	2007 FIRA Championship	
89	2 May 2007	England	22	22	Madrid	2007 FIRA Championship	
90	5 May 2007	Netherlands	37	0	Madrid	2007 FIRA Championship	
91	17 May 2008	Ireland	7	41	Amsterdam	2008 FIRA Championship	
92	20 May 2008	Sweden	20	0	Drachten	2008 FIRA Championship	
93	24 May 2008	Scotland	25	27	Amsterdam	2008 FIRA Championship	
94	17 May 2009	Germany	74	0	Kristinebergs IP, Stockholm	2009 FIRA Trophy	
95	20 May 2009	Sweden	6	11	Körsangens IP, Enköping	2009 FIRA Trophy	
96	23 May 2009	Italy	12	7	Kristinebergs IP, Stockholm	2009 FIRA Trophy	

=== 2010–2012 ===
Test	Date	Opponent	PF	PA	Venue	Event	Ref
97	8 May 2010	Netherlands	26	12	Plaine des Jeux, Longwy	2010 FIRA Trophy	
98	12 May 2010	Belgium	66	0	Stade de la Grange aux Bois, Metz	2010 FIRA Trophy	
99	15 May 2010	Italy	31	13	Stade de la Meinau, Strasbourg	2010 FIRA Trophy	
100	3 January 2011	Scotland	28	13	Madrid	100th Test	
101	30 April 2011	Finland	119	0	Elviña, A Coruña	2011 FIRA Trophy	
102	4 May 2011	Sweden	18	3	Elviña, A Coruña	2011 FIRA Trophy	
103	13 May 2012	England	0	61	Rovereto	2012 FIRA Championship	
104	16 May 2012	France	3	60	Rovereto	2012 FIRA Championship	
105	19 May 2012	Italy	3	54	Rovereto	2012 FIRA Championship	
106	3 December 2012	Italy	12	29	Centro Sportivo Giulio Onesti, Rome	Test	

=== 2013–2014 ===
Test	Date	Opponent	PF	PA	Venue	Event	Ref
107	20 April 2013	Sweden	55	0	Campo Central CIU, Madrid	2014 RWC Qualifier	
108	23 April 2013	Netherlands	78	0	Campo Central CIU, Madrid	2014 RWC Qualifier	
109	27 April 2013	Italy	38	7	Campo Central CIU, Madrid	2014 RWC Qualifier	
110	1 July 2014	France	3	37	Estadio Pepe Rojo, Valladolid	Test	
111	1 August 2014	Canada	5	31	NRC Pitch 2, Marcoussis	2014 World Cup	
112	5 August 2014	England	5	45	NRC Pitch 1, Marcoussis	2014 World Cup	
113	9 August 2014	Samoa	41	5	NRC Pitch 2, Marcoussis	2014 World Cup	
114	13 August 2014	Kazakhstan	18	5	NRC Pitch 1, Marcoussis	2014 World Cup	
115	17 August 2014	South Africa	36	0	NRC Pitch 1, Marcoussis	2014 World Cup	

=== 2015–2017 ===
Test	Date	Opponent	PF	PA	Venue	Event	Ref
116	22 November 2015	Scotland	10	34	Estadio Pepe Rojo, Valladolid	Test	
117	19 December 2015	Hong Kong	57	0	Valle del Arcipreste, Majadahonda	Test	
118	6 October 2016	Belgium	76	0	Campo Central CIU, Madrid	2016 REWC	
119	9 October 2016	Czech Republic	97	0	Campo Central CIU, Madrid	2016 REWC	
120	15 October 2016	Netherlands	35	7	Campo Central CIU, Madrid	2016 REWC	
121	18 November 2016	Scotland	10	5	Scotstoun Stadium, Glasgow	2017 RWC Qualifier	
122	26 November 2016	Scotland	15	10	Campo Central CIU, Madrid	2017 RWC Qualifier	
123	3 June 2017	Hong Kong	41	18	Estadio Municipal, Medina del Campo	Test	
124	8 July 2017	Wales	21	26	The Vale Resort, Vale of Glamorgan	Test	
125	9 August 2017	England	5	56	UCD Bowl, Dún Laoghaire–Rathdown	2017 World Cup	
126	13 August 2017	United States	0	43	UCD Bowl, Dún Laoghaire–Rathdown	2017 World Cup	
127	17 August 2017	Italy	22	8	UCD Bowl, Dún Laoghaire–Rathdown	2017 World Cup	
128	22 August 2017	Hong Kong	31	7	Queen's University Belfast, Belfast	2017 World Cup	
129	26 August 2017	Italy	15	20	Queen's University Belfast, Belfast	2017 World Cup	

=== 2018–2019 ===
Test	Date	Opponent	PF	PA	Venue	Event	Ref
130	27 February 2018	Germany	44	0	Stade du Pachy, Waterloo	2018 REWC	
131	3 March 2018	Netherlands	40	7	Stade du Heysel, Brussels	2018 REWC	
132	11 November 2018	Hong Kong	60	5	Campo del Pantano, Villajoyosa	Test	
133	17 November 2018	South Africa	17	5	Campo del Pantano, Villajoyosa	Test	
134	20 January 2019	Scotland	29	24	Campo Central CIU, Madrid	Test	
135	23 February 2019	Russia	41	0	Campo Central CIU, Madrid	2019 REWC	
136	30 March 2019	Netherlands	54	0	Campo Central CIU, Madrid	2019 REWC	
137	21 September 2019	South Africa	29	12	WJ De Wet Stadium, Despatch	Test	
138	3 November 2019	Wales	29	5	Campo Central CIU, Madrid	Test	

=== 2020–2022 ===
Test	Date	Opponent	PF	PA	Venue	Event	Ref
139	19 January 2020	Scotland	12	36	Estadio Municipal Juan Rojas, Almería	Test	
140	20 February 2021	Russia	56	7	Estadio Pedro Escartín, Guadalajara	2020 REWC	
141	27 February 2021	Netherlands	87	0	Estadio Pedro Escartín, Guadalajara	2020 REWC	
142	13 September 2021	Ireland	8	7	Stadio Sergio Lanfranchi, Parma	2021 World Cup Qualifier	
143	19 September 2021	Scotland	22	27	Stadio Sergio Lanfranchi, Parma	2021 World Cup Qualifier	
144	25 September 2021	Italy	10	34	Stadio Sergio Lanfranchi, Parma	2021 World Cup Qualifier	
145	19 February 2022	Netherlands	69	0	National Rugby Center, Amsterdam	2022 REWC	
146	26 February 2022	Russia	27	0	Las Terrazas, Madrid	2022 REWC	
147	13 August 2022	South Africa	5	44	Ellis Park, Johannesburg	Test	
148	19 August 2022	South Africa	14	37	Absa Puk Oval, Potchefstroom	Test	

=== 2023 ===
Test	Date	Opponent	PF	PA	Venue	Event	Ref
149	19 February 2023	Netherlands	70	0	Poliesportiu de Pins Vens, Sitges	2023 REWC	
150	25 February 2023	Sweden	90	5	Campo del Pantano, Villajoyosa	2023 REWC	
151	25 July 2023	United States	14	20	Estadio Nacional Complutense, Madrid	Test	
152	1 April 2023	South Africa	20	35	Estadio Nacional Complutense, Madrid	Test	
153	15 July 2023	Japan	19	27	Estadio Pedro Escartín	Test	
154	22 July 2023	Italy	0	23	Stadio Walter Beltrametti, Piacenza	2023 WXV Qualifier	
155	30 September 2023	Scotland	5	36	Hive Stadium, Edinburgh		
156	14 October 2023	Kenya	32	0	The Sevens Stadium, Dubai	2023 WXV 3	
157	20 October 2023	Fiji	26	19	The Sevens Stadium, Dubai	2023 WXV 3	
158	28 October 2023	Ireland	13	15	The Sevens Stadium, Dubai	2023 WXV 3	

=== 2024 ===
Test	Date	Opponent	PF	PA	Venue	Event	Ref
159	23 March 2024	South Africa	13	15	Estadio Pepe Rojo, Valladolid		
160	30 March 2024	Portugal	24	0	Sitges	2024 REWC	
161	6 April 2024	Netherlands	22	5	NRCA Stadium, Amsterdam	2024 REWC	
162	12 April 2024	Sweden	53	0	Trelleborg	2024 REWC	
163	29 June 2024	Wales	20	52	Cardiff Arms Park	2024 WXV Qualifier	
164	19 September 2024	South Africa	19	36	DHL Stadium, Cape Town	Test	
165	27 September 2024	Madagascar	83	0	The Sevens Stadium, Dubai	2024 WXV 3	
166	5 October 2024	Netherlands	20	0	The Sevens Stadium, Dubai	2024 WXV 3	
167	12 October 2024	Fiji	10	8	The Sevens Stadium, Dubai	2024 WXV 3	

=== 2025 ===
Test	Date	Opponent	PF	PA	Venue	Event	Ref
168	22 March 2025	Brazil	41	12	Estadio Nelson Mandela, Torrevieja	Test	
169	29 March 2025	Portugal	19	7	CAR Jamor, Oeiras	2025 REC	
170	5 April 2025	Sweden	69	0	Camp Municipal El Vergeret, Tavernes de la Valldigna	2025 REC	
171	13 April 2025	Netherlands	27	17	Campo del Pantano, Villajoyosa	2025 REC	
172	19 April 2025	South Africa	26	48	Bonalba Resort, Mutxamel	Test	
173	19 July 2025	Japan	19	32	Mikuni World Stadium, Kitakyushu	2025 World Cup Warm-Ups	
174	26 July 2025	Japan	19	30	Chichibunomiya Rugby Stadium, Tokyo	2025 World Cup Warm-Ups	
175	2 August 2025	England	7	97	Mattioli Woods Welford Road, Leicester	2025 World Cup Warm-Ups	
176	24 August 2025	New Zealand	8	54	York Community Stadium, York	2025 World Cup	
177	31 August 2025	Ireland	27	43	Franklin's Gardens, Northampton	2025 World Cup	
178	7 September 2025	Japan	21	29	York Community Stadium, York	2025 World Cup	

=== 2026 ===
Test	Date	Opponent	PF	PA	Venue	Event	Ref
179	28 March 2026	Belgium	39	0	Campo Central CIU, Madrid	2026 REC	
180	11 April 2026	Portugal	45	5	CAR Jamor, Oeiras	2026 REC	
181	18 April 2026	Netherlands	TBD	TBD	National Rugby Center, Amsterdam	2026 REC	

== Other matches ==
Date	Spain	Score	Opponent	Venue	Event	Ref
2002-01-19	Spain	5–10	England A	Cornella		
2003-02-01	Spain	0–34	England A	Cornella		
2004-01-31	Spain	5–35	England A	Imber Court		
2006-01-07	Spain	54–5	Basque Country	Plaiaundi, Irun		
2008-02-09	Spain	5–22	England A	Madrid		
2009-02-07	Spain	0–29	England A	London Welsh		
2010-02-14	Spain	5–10	England A	Las Mestas Sports Complex, Gijón		
2010-05-10	Spain	22–5	France A	Verdun	2010 FIRA Trophy	
2011-03-19	Spain	7–34	England A	Surrey Sports Park Pitch 1, Guildford		
2011-05-02	Spain	12–11	France A	University of A Coruña	2011 FIRA Trophy	
2011-05-07	Spain	3–5	England A	University of A Coruña	2011 FIRA Trophy	
2013-01-05	Spain	0–7	Wales XV	National Centre of Excellence, Cardiff		
2013-01-20	Spain	7–39	Ireland XV	Ashbourne Recreation Ground, Ashbourne		
2013-02-23	Spain	29–19	Nomads	Las Mestas, Gijón		
2014-07-05	Spain XV	20–36	Ireland XV	Estadio Pepe Rojo, Valladolid		
2015-12-15	Spain	59–12	Hong Kong XV	Hortaleza, Madrid		
2016-09-10	Spain	116–0	Basque Country	Gamarra, Vitoria-Gasteiz		
2017-01-14	Spain XV	0–39	Wales XV	El Pantano, Villajoyosa		
2017-03-25	Spain XV	53–7	División de Honor All-Star	Valle del Arcipreste, Majadahonda		
2017-05-30	Spain XV	19–8	Hong Kong XV	Estadio Pepe Rojo, Valladolid		
2017-07-22	Spain XV	15–7	England A	Brunel University London		
2017-11-05	Spain XV	5–24	Scotland XV	Valle del Arcipreste, Majadahonda		
2017-11-11	Spain XV	0–97	France XV	Estadio Pedro Escartín, Guadalajara		
2019-09-14	Spain XV	17–5	South Africa Invitational XV	Despatch		
2023-02-11	Spain U20	10–5	Italy U20	Estadi Baldiri Aleu, Sant Boi de Llobregat		
2023-02-11	Spain XV	5–22	Italy VX	Estadi Baldiri Aleu, Sant Boi de Llobregat		
2023-07-09	Spain	12–44	Japan	Las Terrazas, Madrid		
2024-07-09	Spain	12–27	Canada Selects	Amorós Palao, Elche		
2024-06-15	Spain	26–27	Canada Selects	Campo del Pantano, Villajoyosa		
4 April 2026	Spain XV	17–27	England U21	Campo de Rugby El Pantano, Villajoyosa		

=== Other teams ===
Date	Team	Score	Opponent	Venue
1989-06-03	Italy	30–4	Catalonia	Pieve di Cento
1990-10-21	Catalonia	4–0	Wales XV	Barcelona
1995-05-06	Catalonia	75–3	Germany	Rottweil
1996	Basque Country	32–0	France A	Unknown
1998	Basque Country	0–15	Com. of Madrid	Unknown
1998	Basque Country	12–5	Andalusia	Seville
2000-03-31	Catalonia	21–50	Italy	Aubagne, France
2000	Basque Country	86–0	Aragon	Unknown
2001	Basque Country	5–5	Navarre	Unknown
2006	Basque Country	46–5	Navarre	Unknown
2009-04-21	Catalonia	10–24	Netherlands	RC Waterland
2010-03-14	Catalonia	12–17	Basque Country	Lleida
2010-12-05	Catalonia	22–15	Basque Country	Durango, Biscay
2012-02-05	Galicia	7–16	Portugal	Estádio Universitário de Lisboa
2016-02-06	Basque Country	5–42	France U20	Hernani
