= 2006 FIRA Women's European Nations Cup =

2006 FIRA European Nations Cup
Tournament details
- Host: Italy
- Dates: 23 April 2006– 30 April 2006
- Teams: 6

Final positions
- Champions: Italy
- Runner-up: Netherlands

Tournament statistics
- Matches played: 12

The 2006 FIRA Women's European Nations Cup is the eleventh edition of the tournament. With most of the senior nations preparing for the World Cup, FIRA organised a Women's ENC XV a side Tournament for the six leading nations who were not in the Six Nations. While it does not appear to be part of the Women's European Championship sequence, it was very similar to the European Championship, especially the Pool B competitions.

== Pool T1 ==
=== Final table ===
Pos	Nation	Pld	W	D	L	PF	PA	PD	Pts
1	Italy	2	2	0	0	64	0	+64	4
2	Russia	2	1	0	1	24	30	−6	2
3	Belgium	2	0	0	2	0	58	−58	0

=== Results ===
2006-04-23

Italy	34–0	Belgium

San Donà di Piave, Italy

2006-04-23

Belgium	0–24	Russia

San Donà di Piave, Italy

2006-04-23

Italy	30–0	Russia

San Donà di Piave, Italy

== Pool T2 ==
=== Final table ===
Pos	Nation	Pld	W	D	L	PF	PA	PD	Pts
1	Netherlands	2	2	0	0	94	5	+89	4
2	Sweden	2	1	0	1	39	10	+29	2
3	Norway	2	0	0	2	0	118	−118	0

=== Results ===
2006-04-23

Netherlands	84–0	Norway

San Donà di Piave, Italy

2006-04-23

Norway	0–34	Sweden

San Donà di Piave, Italy

2006-04-23

Netherlands	10–5	Sweden

San Donà di Piave, Italy

== Semi-finals ==
2006-04-26

Netherlands	53–5	Russia

San Donà di Piave, Italy

2006-04-26

Italy	33–0	Sweden

San Donà di Piave, Italy

2006-04-26

Belgium	41–0	Norway

San Donà di Piave, Italy

== Final ==
2006-04-30

Italy	28–7	Netherlands

San Donà di Piave, Italy

== Ranking matches ==
2006-04-30

Belgium	0–32	Sweden

San Donà di Piave, Italy

Sweden ranked 4th, Belgium ranked 5th

2006-04-30

Norway	5–62	Russia

San Donà di Piave, Italy

Russia ranked 3rd, Norway ranked 6th

== See also ==
- Women's international rugby union
