= 2015 Rugby Europe Women's Trophy =

2015 Women's European Trophy
Tournament details
- Host: Switzerland

Final positions
- Champions: Belgium
- Runner-up: Switzerland

Tournament statistics
- Matches played: 4

The 2015 Rugby Europe Women's Trophy was the second edition of the competition. It was held in Switzerland from October 29 to November 1, 2015. Belgium were crowned champions after defeating hosts, Switzerland, 50–20 in the final.

== Results ==
Semifinals
Belgium	20
Czech Republic	3
Switzerland	27
Russia	12

Finals
Belgium	50
Switzerland	20
Third place
Czech Republic	15
Russia	41

=== Semi-finals ===
2015-10-29

Belgium	20–3	Czech Republic

Unterägeri, Switzerland

2015-10-29

Switzerland	27–12	Russia

Unterägeri, Switzerland

=== 3rd Place ===
2015-11-01

Czech Republic	15–41	Russia

Unterägeri, Switzerland

=== Final ===
2015-11-01

Switzerland	20–50	Belgium

Unterägeri, Switzerland
