= 2016 Rugby Europe Women's Championship =

2016 Women's European Championship
Tournament details
- Host nation: 2016 Women's European Championship
- Dates: 6 October – 15 October 2016
- No. of nations: 6

Final positions
- Champions: Spain
- Runner-up: Netherlands

Tournament statistics
- Matches played: 9
- Top scorer(s): Patricia García (52)
- Most tries: M.Bakker, A.Bogacheva (6)

The 2016 Women's European Championship was the 21st annual rugby tournament organised by FIRA for the continent's national teams, and also acted as a qualification tournament for 2017 Women's Rugby World Cup.

== Teams ==
- Spain (Host)
- Belgium
- Czech Republic
- Netherlands
- Russia
- Switzerland

== Standings ==
=== Pool A ===
	Team	Games				Points			Tries		Bonus points	Points
	Team	Played	Won	Drawn	Lost	For	Against	Difference	For	Against	Bonus points	Points
1	Spain	2	2	0	0	173	0	+173	31	0	2	10
2	Belgium	2	1	0	1	21	81	-60	4	13	1	5
3	Czech Republic	2	0	0	2	5	118	-113	1	23	0	0
Source : worldrugby.org Points breakdown: *4 points for a win *2 points for a draw *1 bonus point for a loss by seven points or less *1 bonus point for scoring four or more tries in a match

=== Pool B ===
	Team	Games				Points			Tries		Bonus points	Points
	Team	Played	Won	Drawn	Lost	For	Against	Difference	For	Against	Bonus points	Points
1	Netherlands	2	2	0	0	77	15	+62	13	3	2	10
2	Russia	2	1	0	1	66	22	+44	12	4	2	6
3	Switzerland	2	0	0	2	0	106	-106	0	18	0	0
Source : worldrugby.org Points breakdown: *4 points for a win *2 points for a draw *1 bonus point for a loss by seven points or less *1 bonus point for scoring four or more tries in a match

== Fixtures ==
=== Round 1 ===
6 October 2016
15:00 (UTC+01)

Switzerland	0 - 55	Netherlands
	Report

Estadio Nacional Complutense, Madrid
Referee: Marie Lematte (FRA)

6 October 2016
17:00 (UTC+01)

Spain	76 - 0	Belgium
	Report

Estadio Nacional Complutense, Madrid
Referee: Sarah Toll (NED)

=== Round 2 ===
9 October 2016
11:30 (UTC+01)

Netherlands	22 - 17	Russia
	Report

Estadio Nacional Complutense, Madrid
Referee: Alhambra Nievas (ESP)

9 October 2016
13:30 (UTC+01)

Spain	97 - 0	Czech Republic
	Report

Estadio Nacional Complutense, Madrid
Referee: Marie Lematte (FRA)

=== Round 3 ===
12 October 2016
11:30 (UTC+01)

Belgium	20 - 5	Czech Republic
	Report

Estadio Nacional Complutense, Madrid
Referee: Alhambra Nievas (ESP)

12 October 2016
13:30 (UTC+01)

Russia	51 - 0	Switzerland
	Report

Estadio Nacional Complutense, Madrid
Referee: Sarah Toll (NED)

=== Round 4 (place games) ===
15 October 2016
12:00 (UTC+01)

Switzerland	24 - 12	Czech Republic
	Report

Estadio Nacional Complutense, Madrid
Referee: Alhambra Nievas (ESP)

15 October 2016
14:30 (UTC+01)

Belgium	5 - 74	Russia
	Report

Estadio Nacional Complutense, Madrid
Referee: Sarah Toll (NED)

15 October 2016
17:00 (UTC+01)

Spain	35 - 7	Netherlands
	Report

Estadio Nacional Complutense, Madrid
Attendance: 3,500
Referee: Marie Lematte (FRA)

== Final standings ==
Pos	Team	Pld	W	D	L	PF	PA	PD	Pts
1	Spain	3	3	0	0	111	7	+104	15
2	Netherlands	3	2	0	1	84	50	+34	10
3	Russia	3	2	0	1	142	27	+115	11
4	Belgium	3	1	0	2	25	155	−130	5
5	Switzerland	3	1	0	2	24	118	−94	5
6	Czech Republic	3	0	0	3	17	142	−125	0

Scotland and the winner of European Championship (Spain) played a home-and-away series to determine the final European qualifier for the 2017 Women's Rugby World Cup.

== Statistics ==
=== Leading point scorers ===
Top 5 overall point scorers
Pos	Name	Points	Nation
1	Patricia García	52 (4T, 2P, 13C)	Spain
2	Marit Bakker	30 (6T)	Netherlands
2	Alena Bogacheva	30 (6T)	Russia
4	Marina Bravo	25 (5T)	Spain
5	Amaia Erbina	20 (4T)	Spain

=== Leading try scorers ===
Top 5 try scorers
Pos	Name	Tries	Nation
1	Marit Bakker	6	Netherlands
1	Alena Bogacheva	6	Russia
3	Marina Bravo	5	Spain
4	Amaia Erbina	4	Spain
4	Patricia García	4	Spain
