= 2024–25 Rugby Europe Women's Trophy =

2024–25 Women's European Trophy
Tournament details
- Date: 19 October 2024 – 31 May 2025
- Countries: Belgium; Finland; Germany
- Teams: 3

Final positions
- Champions: Belgium
- Runner-up: Germany
- Website: Rugby Europe

The 2024–25 Rugby Europe Women's Trophy was the 13th edition of Rugby Europe's second division competition for women's national rugby union teams. The tournament kicked off on 19 October 2024 and ended on 5 April 2025. The opening match was Germany's first test in 18 months.

Belgium defeated Finland in the tournament's final match and were crowned champions of the Rugby Europe Trophy.

== Standings ==
Pos	Team	P	W	D	L	PF	PA	PD	BP	Pts
1	Belgium	2	2	0	0	67	33	+34	1	9
2	Germany	2	1	0	1	63	33	+30	2	6
3	Finland	2	0	0	2	23	88	–65	0	0
Champion

== Results ==
19 October 2024	Finland	10–44	Germany (1BP)	Hakunila Sports Park, Vantaa
12:00 EEST (UTC+3)	Try: Oona Tolppanen 10' m Emmi Ovaskainen 33' m	Report	Try: Mette Zimmat (4) 6' c, 39' m, 48' m, 80' m Sophie Hacker 57' m Johanna Hacker 61' m Steffi Gruber 64' c Charlotte Malaizier 76' m Con: Charlotte Malaizier (2/8) 7', 65'	Attendance: 100; Referee: Loredena Juncanariu (ROU)

8 March 2025	Germany (1BP)	19–23	Belgium	Fritz-Grunebaum-Sportpark, Heidelberg
15:00 CET (UTC+1)	Try: Steffi Gruber 39' c Johanna Hacker (2) 57' c, 62' m Con: Charlotte Malaizier (2/3) 40', 58'	Report	Try: Jeanne Marquegnies (2) 4' c, 10' c Con: Lara Steurs (2/2) 5', 13'; Pen: Lara Steurs (2) 31', 37'; Chanel Germiat 77'	Attendance: 876; Referee: Mariam Goguadze (GRU)

5 April 2025	Belgium (1BP)	44–13	Finland	Stade du Pachy, Waterloo
17:00 CEST (UTC+2)	Try: Charlotte Timperman 9'm Chanel Germiat (3) 19'c, 41'm, 56'm Tiphaine Deglasse 50'c Cristina Pecoraro 65'm Amélie Delacourt 69'c Con: Lara Steurs (2/6) 20', 51'; Chanel Germiat (1/1) 69'; Pen: Lara Steurs 34'	Report	Try: Hanna Visuri 69'c Con: Oona Tolppanen 69'; Pen: Saana Järvenpää 28'; Oona Tolppanen 39'	Referee: Beatrice Smussi (IRF)
