= 2010 FIRA Women's European Trophy =

2010 Women's European Trophy
- Date: 8 May 2010– 15 May 2010
- Countries: Belgium; France A Germany; Italy; Netherlands; Russia; Spain; Sweden

Final positions
- Champions: Spain
- Runner-up: Italy

Tournament statistics
- Matches played: 16
- Top scorer(s): (Netherlands) Lorraine Laros (Netherlands) Elke van Meer (30 points)
- Most tries: (Netherlands) Elke van Meer (6 tries)

The 2010 FIRA tournament included all the continent's major teams who did not qualify for the World Cup, plus Sweden (who did qualify) and a France "A" team. Prior to the tournament Jean-Claude Baqué, Chairman of the FIRA-AER, explained the philosophy of the European Trophy. "The European Trophy is an important tournament for the development of women 15's rugby within Europe. The European Championship takes place each four years (Note: next edition in 2012) but the FIRA-AER must propose games to emerging unions through a serious competition and with the help of the big nations" Unusually, and for no published reason, all games were only 35 minutes per half.

== Pool A ==
Position	Nation	Games				Points				Table points
Position	Nation	Played	Won	Drawn	Lost	For	Against	Difference	Tries	Table points
1	Spain	3	3	0	0	114	17	97	18	15
2	Netherlands	3	2	0	1	100	31	69	16	9
3	France A	3	1	0	2	80	36	44	14	5
4	Belgium	3	0	0	3	0	210	-210	0	0

=== Results ===
2010-05-08

France A	70-0	Belgium
Tries: Milena Soloch 4', 23', 47'; Sandra Rabier 11'; Clarisse Fell 17'; Nadège Casenave 26', 35'; Camille Grassineau 36'; Anne Rambaud 56'; Hayate Chrouky 58'; Elodie Martin 60'; Cyndia Mansard 69'; Cons: Aurelia Cellier 23', 36', 47', 56', 69'

Plaine des Jeux, Longwy, Meurthe-et-Moselle
Referee: Katharina Pickert (Germany)

2010-05-08

Netherlands	12-26	Spain
Tries: Kelly van Harskamp 7', 42'; Con: Lorraine Laros 7'		Tries: Aitziber Porras 23', 34'; Patricia García 29'; Ana María Aigneren 40'; Cons: Marina Bravo 23', 29', 40'

Plaine des Jeux, Longwy, Meurthe-et-Moselle
Referee: Sylvie Bros (France)

2010-05-10

France A	5-22	Spain
Try: Alexandra Pertus 20'		Tries: Isabel Rodriguez 6', 23'; Bárbara Pla 33'; Ángela Del Pan 39'; Con: Marina Bravo 23'

Stade du Parc de Londres, Verdun, Meuse
Referee: Sherry Trumbull (Canada)

2010-05-10

Belgium	0-74	Netherlands
		Tries: Elke van Meer 5', 39', 44'; Rita Wiri 15', 24'; Kelly van Harskamp 19'; Lusan Beijens 27', 65'; Dorien Eppink 32'; Inge Visser 50'; Joyce van Altena 56'; Anne Hielckert 58'; Cons: Kelly van Harskamp 19'; Lorraine Laros 24', 27', 39', 50', 56', 65'

Stade du Parc de Londres, Verdun, Meuse
Referee: Joyce Henry (Canada)

2010-05-12

Belgium	0-66	Spain
		Tries: Berta García 7'; Aitziber Porras 12'; Marta Pocurull 17', 49'; Vanessa Rial 20'; Lía Bailán 31', 64'; Isabel Rodríguez 34'; Elizabeth Martínez 45', 47'; Cons: Isabel Dólera 12', 17', 20', 31', 34', 45', 47', 49'

Stade de la Grange aux Bois, Metz, Moselle
Referee: Katharina Pickert (Germany)

2010-05-12

France A	5-14	Netherlands
Try: Alexandra Pertus 51'		Tries: Kelly van Harskamp 15'; Joyce van Altena 42'; Cons: Lorraine Laros 15', 42'

Stade de la Grange aux Bois, Metz, Moselle
Referee: Joyce Henry (Canada)

== Pool B ==
Position	Nation	Games				Points				Table points
Position	Nation	Played	Won	Drawn	Lost	For	Against	Difference	Tries	Table points
1	Italy	3	3	0	0	86	0	86	13	14
2	Sweden	3	2	0	1	61	10	51	10	10
3	Russia	3	1	0	2	17	79	-62	3	4
4	Germany	3	0	0	3	14	89	-75	2	1

=== Results ===
2010-05-08

Germany	0-43	Italy
		Tries: Maria Diletta Veronese 10', 35'; Manuela Furlan 22', 68'; Maria Grazia Cioffi 31'; Elisa Cucchiella 39'; Claudia Tedeschi 45'; Cons: Veronica Schiavon 22', 31', 39', 45'

Stade Grubfeld, Sélestat, Bas-Rhin
Referee: Joyce Henry (Canada)

2010-05-08

Russia	0-32	Sweden
		Tries: Jennifer Lindholm 3', 13'; Ninni Giebat Johansson 28'; Jennie Öhman 43'; Lina Norman 51'; Cons: Ulrika Andersson Hall 28', 51'; Pen: Ulrika Andersson Hall 18'

Stade Grubfeld, Sélestat, Bas-Rhin
Referee: Sherry Trumbull (Canada)

2010-05-10

Italy	33-0	Russia
Tries: Chiara Castellarin 17', 40'; Maria Diletta Veronese 35'+1'; Germana Raponi 46'; Elisa Rochas 55'; Con: Michela Tondinelli 55'; Pens: Michela Tondinelli 5', 31'

Stade de l'Europe, Colmar, Haut-Rhin
Referee: Sylvie Bros (France)

2010-05-10

Germany	0-29	Sweden
		Tries: Ulrika Andersson Hall 2', 29'; Anna Larsson 15'; Sara Åkerman 20'; Sofia Torstensson 65'; Cons: Lina Norman 15', 20'

Stade de l'Europe, Colmar, Haut-Rhin
Referee: Barbara Guastini (Italy)

2010-05-12

Italy	10-0	Sweden
Try: Maria Diletta Veronese 29'; Con: Veronica Schiavon 29'; Pen: Veronica Schiavon 70'+5'

Parc des Sports, Haguenau, Bas-Rhin
Referee: Sherry Trumbull (Canada)

2010-05-12

Germany	14-17	Russia
Tries: Ninja Duri 35'; Lisa Maral 43'; Cons: Maike Tetz 35', 43'		Tries: Tatiana Sokolova 16', 30'; Nadezda Yarmotskaya 70'; Con: Natalia Alexeeva 30'

Parc des Sports, Haguenau, Bas-Rhin
Referee: Sylvie Bros (France)

== 7th place ==
2010-05-15

Belgium	5-5	Germany
Try: Cathy de Geyter 3'		Try: Jacqueline Peisker 55'

Centre sportif de Hautepierre, Strasbourg, Bas-Rhin
Referee: Barbara Guastini (Italy)

== 5th place ==
2010-05-15

France A	35-0	Russia
Tries: Sandra Rabier 17'; Cyndia Mansard 24'; Koumiba Djossouvi 28', 68'; Sylvie Bernard 34'; Camille Grassineau 46'; Con: Aurelia Cellier 24'; Pen: Aurelia Cellier 14'

Stade de la Meinau, Strasbourg, Bas-Rhin
Referee: Katharine Pickert (Germany)

== 3rd place ==
2010-05-15

Netherlands	47-19	Sweden
Tries: Kelly van Harskamp 16'; Pien Selbeck 28', 35'+5'; Dorien Eppink 48'; Elke van Meer 62', 67', 70'; Cons: Lorraine Laros 16', 28', 35'+5', 48', 62', 67'		Tries: Frida Ryberg 9'; Elisabeth Österberg 13'; Henriette Högberg 70'+2'; Cons: Ulrika Andersson Hall 13', 70'+2'

Complexe sportif Albert Schweitzer, Illkirch-Graffenstaden, Bas-Rhin
Referee: Joyce Henry (Canada)

== Final ==
2010-05-15

Italy	13-31	Spain
Try: Manuela Furlan 53'; Con: Veronica Schiavon 53'; Pens: Veronica Schiavon 3', 33'		Tries: Ana María Aignaren 19'; Bárbara Pla 25'; García Rocío 44'; Julia Pla 50'; Marta Pocurull 59'; Cons: Marina Bravo 25', 44', 59'

Stade de la Meinau, Strasbourg, Bas-Rhin
Referee: Sherry Trumbull (Canada)

== Point scorers ==
=== Leading point scorers ===
Points	Name	Played	Team	Notes
30	Elke Van Meer	3	Netherlands	6 tries
30	Lorraine Laros	4	Netherlands	15 cons
27	Kelly van Harskamp	4	Netherlands	5 tries, 1 con
21	Ulrika Anderson Hall	4	Sweden	2 tries, 4 cons, 1 pen
21	Veronica Schiavon	4	Italy	6 cons, 3 pens
20	Maria Diletta Veronese	4	Italy	4 tries
16	Isabel Dólera	1	Spain	8 cons
15	Milena Soloch	3	France A	3 tries
15	Aurelia Cellier	4	France A	6 cons, 1 pen
15	Manuela Furlan	4	Italy	3 tries
15	Marta Pocurull	4	Spain	3 tries
15	Aitziber Porras	4	Spain	3 tries
15	Isabel Rodriguez	4	Spain	3 tries

=== Other point scorers ===
14 points: Marina Bravo (Spain)
10 points: Ana María Aigneren (Spain), Joyce van Altena (Netherlands), Lía Bailán (Spain), Lusan Beijens (Netherlands), Nadège Casenave (France A), Chiara Castellarin (Italy), Koumiba Djossouvi (France A), Dorien Eppink (Netherlands), Camille Grassineau (France A), Jennifer Lindholm (Sweden), Cyndia Mansard (France A), Elizabeth Martínez (Spain), Alexandra Pertus (France A), Bárbara Pla (Spain), Sandra Rabier (France A), Pien Selbeck (Netherlands), Tatiana Sokolova (Russia), Maike Tetz (Germany)
9 points: Lina Norman (Sweden)
8 points: Michela Tondinelli (Italy)
5 points: Sara Åkerman (Sweden), Sylvie Bernard (France A), Hayate Chrouky (France A), Maria Grazia Cioffi (Italy), Elisa Cucchiella (Italy), Cathy de Geyther (Belgium), Ángela Del Pan (Spain), Ninja Duri (Germany), Clarisse Fell (France A), Berta García (Spain), Patricia García (Spain), Anne Hielckert (Netherlands), Henriette Högberg (Sweden), Ninni Giebat Johansson (Sweden), Anna Larsson (Sweden), Lisa Maral (Germany), Jennie Öhman (Sweden), Elisabeth Österberg (Sweden), Jaqueline Peisker (Germany), Julia Pla (Spain), Anna Rambaud (France A), Germana Raponi (Italy), Vanessa Rial (Spain), Elisa Rochas (Italy), García Rocío (Spain), Frida Ryberg (Sweden), Claudia Tedeschi (Italy), Sofia Torstensson (Sweden), Inge Visser (Netherlands), Rita Wiri (Netherlands), Nadezda Yarmotskaya (Russia)
2 points: Natalia Alexeeva (Russia)

== See also ==
- Women's international rugby union
