= Fritz-Grunebaum-Sportpark =

Heidelberg rugby stadium

Coordinates: 49.3906°N 8.6681°E

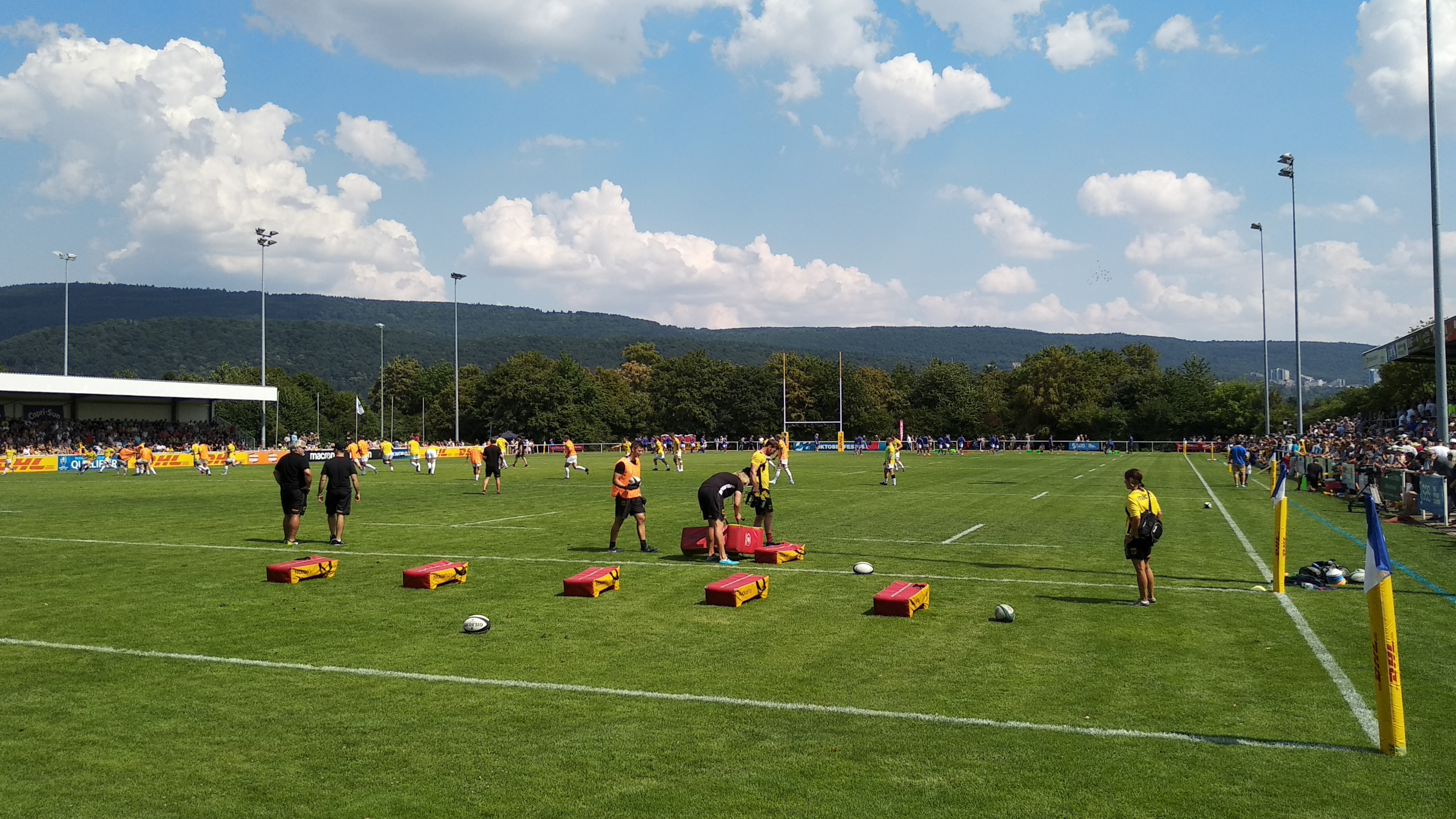
- Interactive map of Fritz-Grunebaum-Sportpark
- Location: Heidelberg, Germany
- Capacity: 5,000
- Surface: Grass

Construction
- Opened: 1996

Tenants
- RG Heidelberg; Germany

The Fritz-Grunebaum-Sportpark is a rugby union stadium in Heidelberg, Germany. It is the home ground of the RG Heidelberg and also frequently used for international games of the Germany national rugby union team.

In its 2008-2010 European Nations Cup First Division campaign, Germany played three of its five home games at the stadium, the other two being held at Heusenstamm and Hanover.

The stadium is in the Kirchheim suburb of Heidelberg and is capable of holding 5,000 spectators, 380 of them in a roofed grandstand.

It is named after Fritz Grunebaum, founder of the Karin Grunebaum Cancer Research Foundation.
