= 1994 Women's Rugby World Cup =

Tournament details
- Host nation: Scotland
- Dates: 11 – 24 April 1994
- No. of nations: 12

Final positions
- Champions: England (1st title)
- Runner-up: United States

Tournament statistics
- Matches played: 31
- Top scorer(s): (United States) Jennifer Crawford (60)
- Most tries: (United States) Jennifer Crawford (10)
- Points scored: 1,341 (average 43.26 per match)

The 1994 Women's Rugby World Cup was the second world cup for women. It was originally scheduled to be held in Amsterdam, Netherlands (10–24 April) but was cancelled only weeks before. However, a replacement competition was organised around the same dates in Scotland. England beat the defending champions USA 38–23 in the final.

== Background ==
The official reason for the cancellation was that the event organisers failed to get official endorsement of the event as the "Women's World Cup" from the International Rugby Board (IRB). The minutes of the 1993 Interim meeting of the IRB state the following about the "1994 Women's International Tournament":

"The Council agreed to defer consideration of participation by member unions in the tournament until such time as a formal request is received from the organizers."

Hence not only was there uncertainty to whether it really was the "Women's World Cup" or not, but the IRB refused to endorse it regardless of its status – the "deferral" (above) was in practice a refusal to endorse as the next scheduled IRB meeting was only days before the event was due to start. It was not until 2009 that the IRB officially endorsed the event as a "world cup" when it published, for the first time, a list of previous winners.

Because of this, the Unions of some countries decided not to pay team expenses (including New Zealand, where women's rugby was by now fully integrated in the national union, and ultimately others as well) or withdrew their entries. Several team members decided to go ahead and raised the money themselves, but the surrounding uncertainty of the event status and the financial risk from teams pulling out prompted the event organizers to (rather abruptly) cancel it.

The women who had trained so hard, and had gone to much trouble raising money etc., were so disappointed at the cancellation that an alternative tournament in Scotland was soon organized. Despite the IRB threatening sanctions against unions taking part in this unendorsed event, it went ahead.

This Women's Rugby World Cup, like its predecessor in 1991, was never endorsed by the IRB and the Scottish organizers did not pursue official sanctioning. However, all of the participating teams regarded it as the "real" World Cup.

Eventually eleven of the original sixteen entrants took part – as well as New Zealand, Netherlands also withdrew from both participation as well as hosts, and Spain pulled out very late – after the groups had been drawn – and were replaced by a Scottish Students team. Italy and Germany were also notable absentees. The Soviet Union would have competed but due to their dissolution, they were replaced by Russia and Kazakhstan.

Once the event was underway it proved to be a great success, England exacting revenge for their 1991 defeat to USA, beating the defending champions 38–23 in the final.

== Match Officials ==
J Fleming (Boroughmuir)

== Pool stages ==
=== Pool A ===
Team	Pld	W	D	L	PF	PA	PD
United States	2	2	0	0	232	0	+232
Japan	2	1	0	1	10	126	−116
Sweden	2	0	0	2	5	121	−116

11 April 1994

Sweden	0–111	United States

Melrose

13 April 1994

Japan	10–5	Sweden

Melrose

15 April 1994

Japan	0–121	United States

Melrose

=== Pool B ===
Team	Pld	W	D	L	PF	PA	PD
England	2	2	0	0	92	0	+92
Scotland	2	1	0	1	51	26	+25
Russia	2	0	0	2	0	117	−117

11 April 1994

England	66–0	Russia

Boroughmuir

13 April 1994

Scotland	51–0	Russia

Boroughmuir

15 April 1994

Scotland	0–26	England

Boroughmuir

=== Pool C ===
Team	Pld	W	D	L	PF	PA	PD
France	2	2	0	0	108	8	+100
Ireland	2	1	0	1	18	36	−18
(Scotland) Scottish Students	2	0	0	2	13	95	−82

11 April 1994

Scottish Students (Scotland)	8–77	France

West of Scotland RFC

13 April 1994

Scottish Students (Scotland)	5–18	Ireland

West of Scotland RFC

15 April 1994

France	31–0	Ireland

West of Scotland RFC

=== Pool D ===
Team	Pld	W	D	L	PF	PA	PD
Wales	2	2	0	0	40	13	+27
Canada	2	1	0	1	33	11	+22
Kazakhstan	2	0	0	2	8	57	−49

11 April 1994

Canada	5–11	Wales

Edinburgh Academicals RFC

13 April 1994

Kazakhstan	8–29	Wales

Edinburgh Academicals RFC

15 April 1994

Canada	28–0	Kazakhstan

Edinburgh Academicals RFC

== Plate competition ==
=== Round robin ===
Team	Pld	W	D	L	PF	PA	PD	Ladder
Kazakhstan	3	3	0	0	83	12	+71	9th
Sweden	3	2	0	1	46	56	−10	10th
Russia	3	1	0	2	37	57	−20	11th
(Scotland) Scottish Students	3	0	0	3	24	65	−41	12th

17 April 1994

Russia	13–20	Sweden

Kirkcaldy

17 April 1994

Scottish Students (Scotland)	0–27	Kazakhstan

Kirkcaldy

19 April 1994

Scottish Students (Scotland)	12–14	Sweden

Gala

19 April 1994

Kazakhstan	25–0	Russia

Gala

21 April 1994

Kazakhstan	31–12	Sweden

Stirling County

21 April 1994

Scottish Students (Scotland)	12–24	Russia

Stirling County

=== Plate final ===
23 April 1994

Kazakhstan	29–12	Sweden

Boroughmuir

== Championship ==
=== Bracket ===
==== Championship ====
Quarter-finals
17 April – Gala
England	24
Canada	10
17 April – Edinburgh
France	99
Japan	0
17 April – Boroughmuir
United States	76
Ireland	0
17 April – Melrose
Wales	8
Scotland	0

Semi-finals
20 April – Gala
England	18
France	6
20 April – Gala
United States	56
Wales	15

Final
24 April – Edinburgh
England	38
United States	23
Third place
24 April – Edinburgh
France	27
Wales	0

==== Shield ====
Semi-finals
20 April – Melrose
Canada	57
Japan	0
20 April – Melrose
Ireland	3
Scotland	10

Final
23 April – Boroughmuir
Canada	5
Scotland	11
Third place
23 April – Boroughmuir
Ireland	11
Japan	3

=== Quarter-finals ===
17 April 1994

United States	76–0	Ireland

Boroughmuir

17 April 1994

England	24–10	Canada

Gala

17 April 1994

France	99–0	Japan

Edinburgh Academicals RFC

17 April 1994

Scotland	0–8	Wales

Melrose

=== Championship semi-finals ===
20 April 1994

United States	56–15	Wales

Gala

20 April 1994

England	18–6	France

Gala

=== Shield semi-finals ===
20 April 1994

Canada	57–0	Japan

Melrose

20 April 1994

Scotland	10–3	Ireland

Melrose

=== Shield 3rd/4th (7th place) ===
23 April 1994

Ireland	11–3	Japan

Boroughmuir

=== Shield final (5th place) ===
23 April 1994

Scotland	11–5	Canada

Boroughmuir

=== Cup 3rd/4th place ===
24 April 1994

France	27–0	Wales

Edinburgh Academicals RFC

=== Cup final ===
24 April 1994

England	38–23	United States

Edinburgh Academicals RFC
Referee: Jim Fleming (Scotland)

1994 Women's Rugby World Cup winners

England
First title

== Sources ==
- Rugby World Cup Women’s Stats Archive
- Women's Rugby Data

== See also ==
- Women's Rugby World Cup
- Rugby World Cup
- Rugby World Cup Sevens
- Scottish Women's Rugby Union
