= San Donà di Piave =

- Comune
- Città di San Donà di Piave
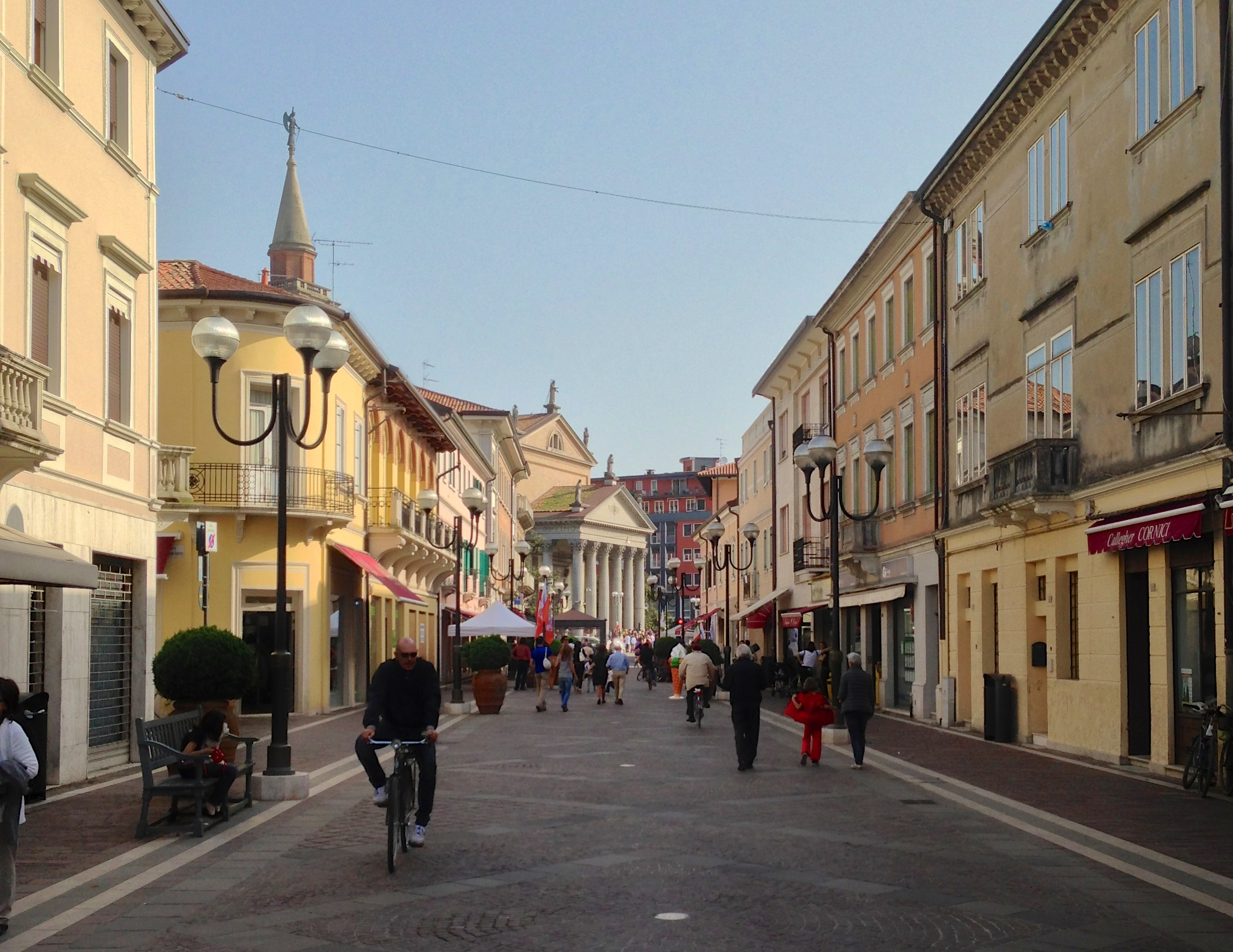
- Historic centre.

- Coat of arms

- Location within Italy Location within Veneto
- Coordinates: 45°38′N 12°34′E
- Country: Italy
- Region: Veneto
- Metropolitan city: Venice (VE)
- Frazioni: Calvecchia, Chiesanuova, Cittanova, Fiorentina, Fossà, Grassaga, Isiata, Mussetta di Sopra, Palazzetto, Passarella, Santa Maria di Piave

Government
  - Mayor: Alberto Teso

Area
  - Total: 78.73 km^{2} (30.40 sq mi)
- Elevation: 3 m (9.8 ft)

Population (28 February 2017)
  - Total: 41,856
  - Density: 531.6/km^{2} (1,377/sq mi)
- Demonym: Sandonatesi
- Time zone: UTC+1 (CET)
  - Summer (DST): UTC+2 (CEST)
- Postal code: 30027
- Dialing code: 0421
- Patron saint: Our Lady of the Rosary
- Saint day: First Monday in October
- Website: Official website

San Donà di Piave (Italian pronunciation: [san doˈna ddi ˈpjaːve]; Venetian: San Donà [saŋ doˈna]) is a city and comune in the Metropolitan City of Venice, Veneto, northern Italy. It is one of the historical main towns of the Eastern Veneto territory, although it was totally reconstructed in the early 1920s after being heavily damaged during World War I.

== Geography ==
San Donà lies on the river Piave 33.6 km (20.9 mi) from Venice, 26.1 km (16.2 mi) from Treviso, and 26.1 km (16.2 mi) from Pordenone. San Donà and the surrounding cities in Veneto are known for being foggy in the autumn and the winter months.

It bounds the communes of Noventa di Piave, Musile di Piave and Fossalta di Piave, that have become in practice a part of a single urban area, also known as Città del Piave. Besides, San Donà borders on the territories of Jesolo, Eraclea, Ceggia, Torre di Mosto, Cessalto and Salgareda.

== History ==
The area was inhabited since the prehistoric age: the archeological researches that have taken place during the 20th century have revealed traces of a Neolithic village in the neighbourhood of Chiesanuova, on the left bank of the river Piave Moreover, significant traces of centuriation and the presence of an articulate road network make suppose that the zone was inhabited also during the Roman age. During the Early Middle Ages, the fate of the area was bound to the city of Heraclia, bishopric, and first capital of the Duchy of Venice. The city, grown in the 7th century in the area of the suburb of Cittanova, disappeared in the 9th century.

After the year 1000, in the modern town's territory, two villages were built: San Donato and Mussetta. They were at first subject to the temporal jurisdiction (papacy) of the patriarchy of Aquileia and then they were affected by the events of the Ezzelini family. The village of Mussetta was situated in the north, close to a castle built by the patriarchs of Aquileia, while the village of San Donato was situated in the south, surrounding a chapel which was present since 1154.

In 1250 the area experienced a catastrophic flood from the river Piave, which changed its course, moving the chapel from the left bank to the right one. This deviation implied the separation of the church from its reference area, that started to be called "San Donato de qua de la Piave" to be distinct from the area closest to the chapel: "San Donato oltre la Piave" (the current Musile di Piave).

During the 13th and 14th centuries the area was in a strategic position between the Marca Trevigiana and the Republic of Venice and for these reasons was exposed to plunder and destruction, which ended with the occupation of the area by the troops of Sigismund of Luxemburg and the destruction of Mussetta.

At the end of the war between the Republic of Venice and the Kingdom of Hungary, the Republic incentivized the development of the territory, offering tax exemptions to the farmers that were inclined to move in the territory of San Donà. As a matter of fact, Venice was straight interested in this area since most of the town's surface was state-owned property.

During the Modern era, the Republic of Venice started some reclamation interventions in the area of Basso Piave and assigned the management of the territory to a functionary. In 1468 compelling financial needs induced the Republic to give the Gastaldia of the town in emphyteusis. In 1475 it was assigned to Francesco Marcello and Angelo Trevisan, and it later became private property of the Trevisan family. The public authority was held by a functionary nominated by the Doge, the Ducal Vicarial, who had the duty to pledge the oath of allegiance to the Republic and to reside in San Donà. The first Vicarial, Antonio Lupo, was installed in 1476 by the Doge Pietro Mocenigo. During the same year, the construction of a new church started, it was dedicated to Blessed Virgin Mary and consecrated in July 1480.

The growth and the development of the urban center was difficult at the beginning, especially because of unstable hydro balance. In order to preserve the lagoon from the periodical floods caused by the river, during the 16th and 17th centuries the Republic of Venice promoted some hydraulic works, deviating the courses of the rivers that were present.

In 1797 was established the municipality of San Donà, administrative center of one of the fifteen cantons of the Treviso's district. With the annexation of Venice and its dependency to the Napoleonic Italian Kingdom, on 1 May 1806 the Department of Adriatic was created and the town of San Donà was part of it as administrative center of the territory of the same name. At the beginning of the 19th century, were created the first consortiums for the reclamation of the swampland at east and south of the urban center, while the city was significantly increasing its administrative functions. The city of San Donà was part of the Lombard-Venetian Kingdom from 1815 and during the Austrian domination it kept its position of county seat of the district. In the first part of the 19th century the urban center was enriched with palaces, commercial buildings and a new cathedral, realized from 1838 and 1841.

With the annexation of Veneto to the Kingdom of Italy, new hydraulic works was made in the area, scarring the environmental metamorphosis and increasing the productivity of the area. Railway and steamboat connections were created, the road network was expanded and new industries and services for the population were started.

The impact of the First World War on the city was devastating. After the barging of the Italian lines in Caporetto, the Italian army gave ground and reorganized itself on the new frontline along the river Piave. On 13 November 1917 began the long months of trench warfare, culminated in the Battle of Solstizio. In the autumn of 1918 the Italian army took the offensive against the Austrian emplacement and on 31 October 1918 the city of San Donà came back to the Italian territory. At the end of the long months of combat, the city infrastructures were completely destroyed and most of the architectural and artistic patrimony was lost. The first postwar period was characterized by the complete reconstruction of the city and by the renovation of the socio-economic activities, of the traffic between the city and the other districts and of the railway service. In 1940 Italy went to war alongside of Germany. After 8 September 1943 hundreds of citizens were engaged in the Italian resistance movement. In 1944 the city was exposed to several bombardments: during the aerial raid both the Verdi Theater and the Umberto I Hospital were destroyed. On 25 April 1945, in the presence of six thousands German soldiers, was proclaimed the insurrection of the city, and in the same day, the town of San Donà was free. San Donà is now a crucial point of the transport infrastructures between Vento and Friuli Venezia-Giulia, crossroad between the industrial development zone in the area of Treviso and the tourist attractions of Cavallino-Treporti, Jesolo, Eraclea and Caorle.

== Culture ==
=== The friendship pact ===
Seven centuries ago, during the Middle Ages, San Donà and the close village of Musile di Piave were two small communities of the wetland situated north-east of Venetian Lagoon. The "friendship pact" between the two communities combines historical fact and legend. In 1258 (according to the historian Plateo) or in 1383 (according to other scholar) the Piave River changed its course naturally. At that time the river marked the boundary between two dioceses: the Patriarch of Aquileia on the eastern side and the diocese of Torcello (Venice) on the other one. The church of San Donato (Saint Donatus), which was previously on the eastern side of the river Piave, and therefore on the side of San Donà, after the flood was on the western side of the river in the current territory of Musile di Piave. Thus the village of San Donà (whose name is the truncated form of San Donato) lost its identity symbol. Hence the compromise: San Donà kept the name of the saint, but its population must reward that one of Musile with two capons ("gallos eviratos duos") on 7 August each year. Moreover, the community of Musile retained the right to make the traditional feast in honor of the parish patron saint.

This is the synthesis of "friendship pact": every year on 7 August the payment of tribute is repeated. The tradition has been restored in a ceremony with attention to historical details under the patronage of the Veneto Region.

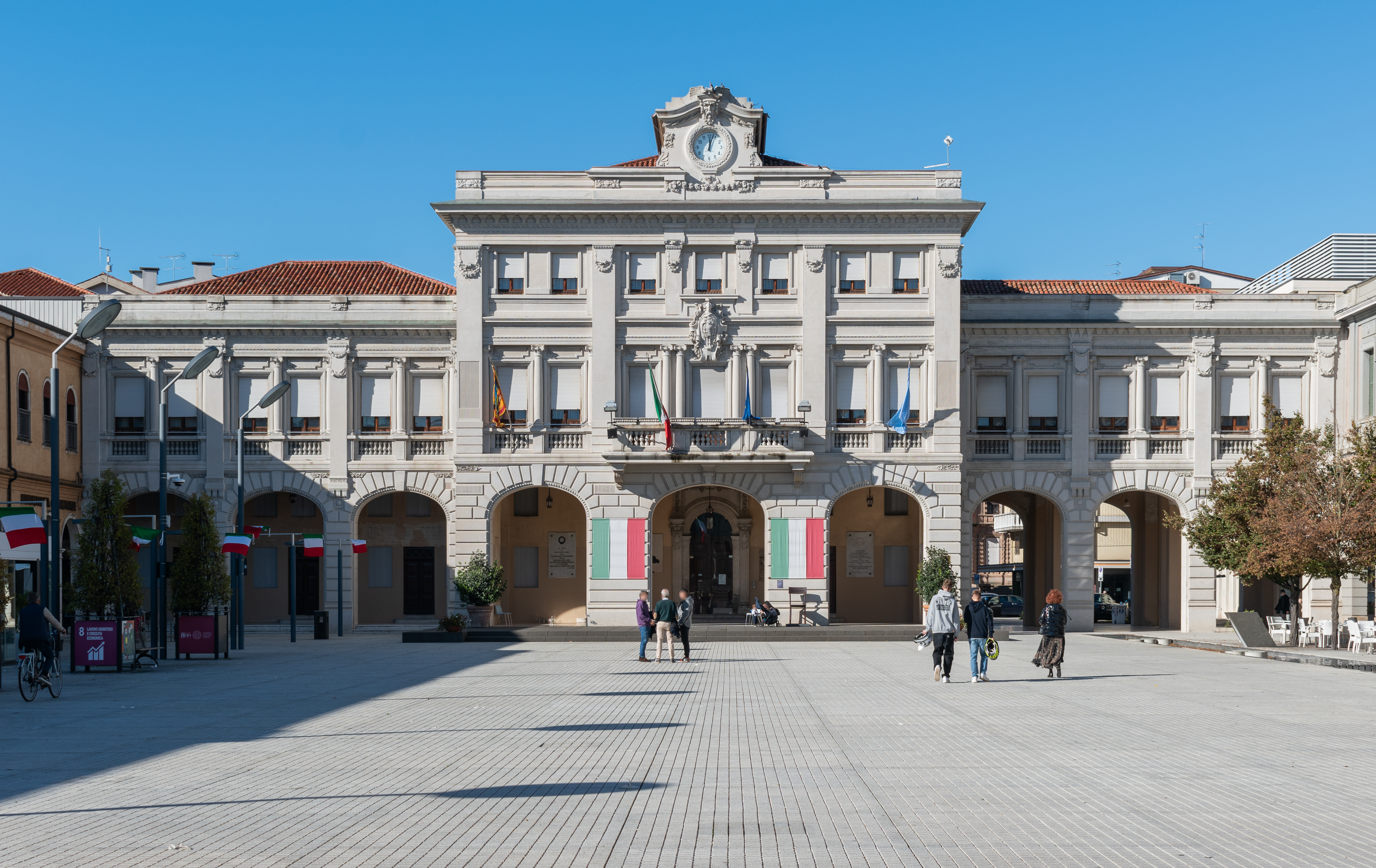
The Town Hall.

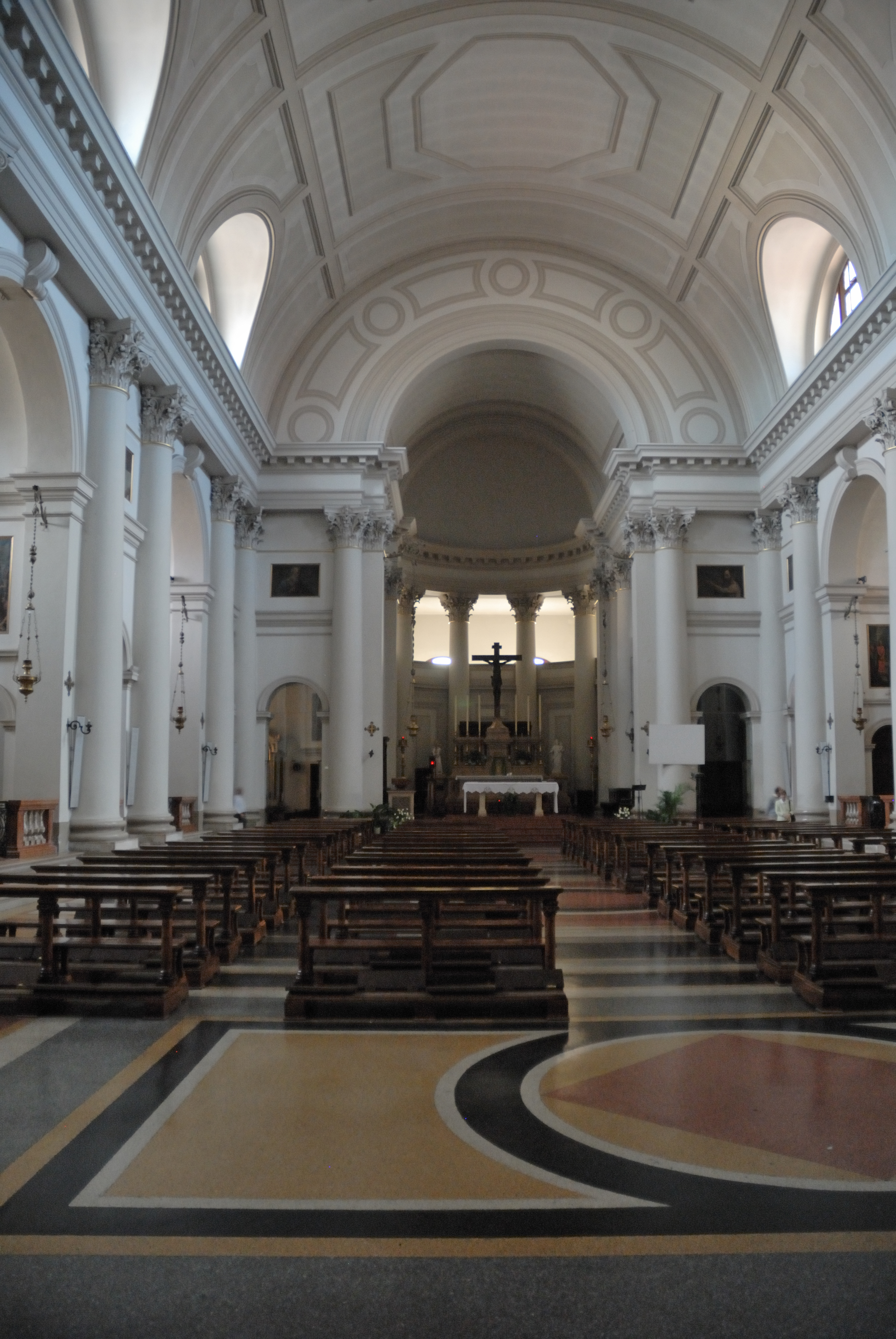
The interior of the Duomo.

== Main sights ==
- Duomo of Blessed Virgin Mary (19th century, rebuilt after the World War I)
- Church of Saint Charles in Chiesanuova
- Villa Ancillotto and its ornamental historical park (18th–20th centuries)

=== Museums ===
- Museo della Bonifica (Land Reclamation Museum)
- Galleria Civica d'Arte Moderna e Contemporanea (City Museum of Modern and Contemporary Art)
- Parco della Scultura in Architettura (Park of Sculpture in Architecture)

== Transportation ==
The town is served by the San Donà di Piave-Jesolo railway station.

== Twin towns ==
- Villeneuve-sur-Lot, France

== See also ==
- Italian Front (World War I)
- Province of Venice
- Piave (river)
- SandonàJesoloCalcio

== Sources ==
- Pavan, Laura (2007). Lands of Eastern Veneto. Tourism and Cultural Guide. Portogruaro: Edicilio Editore.
