= Unterägeri =

- Municipality
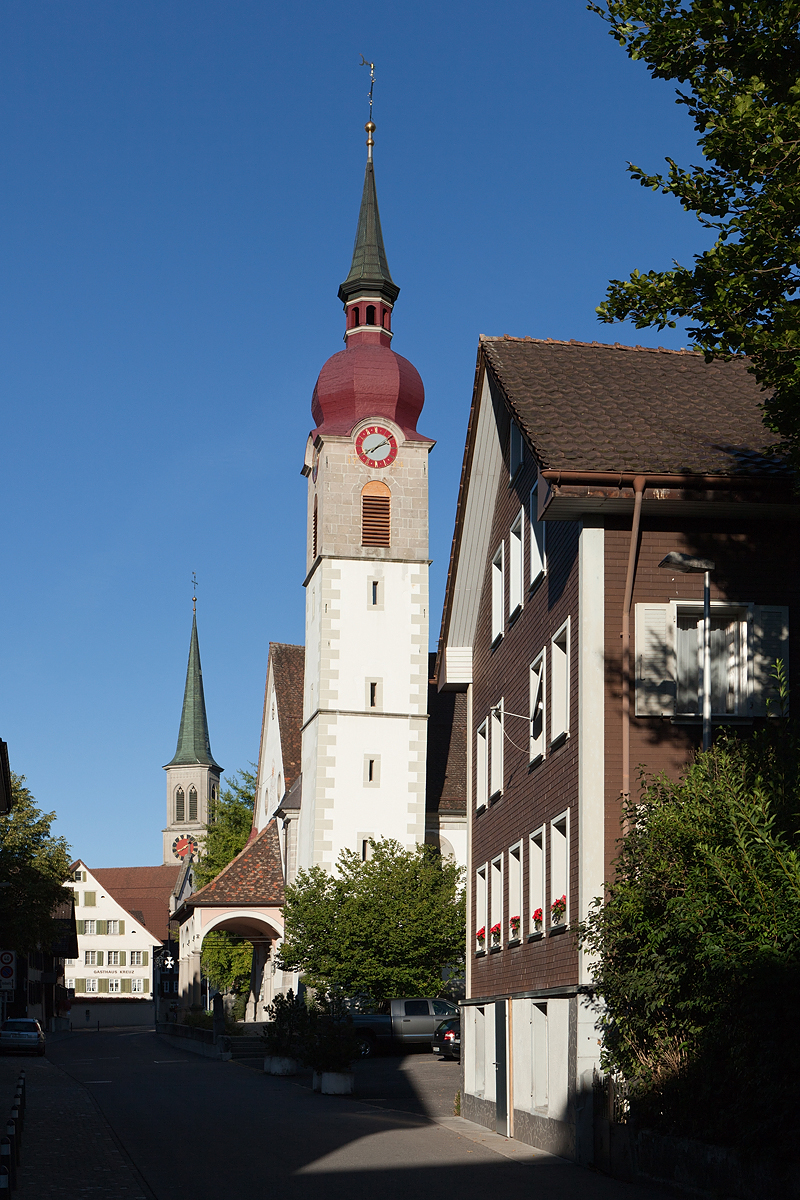

- Flag Coat of arms
- Location of Unterägeri
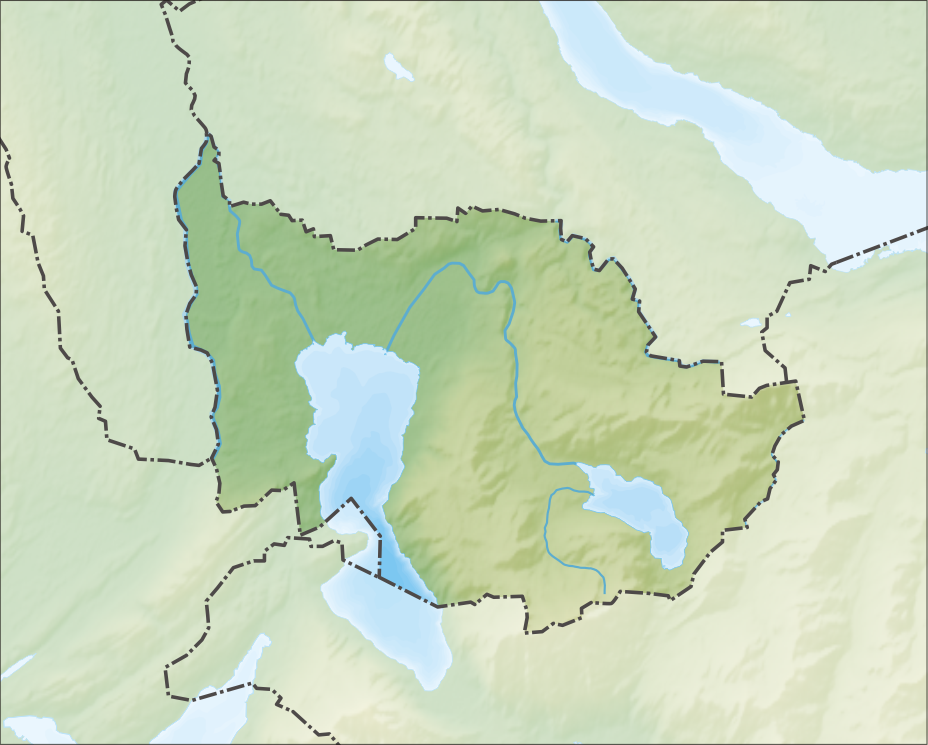
- Location within Switzerland Location within Canton of Zug
- Coordinates: 47°8′N 8°35′E
- Country: Switzerland
- Canton: Zug
- District: n.a.

Area
  - Total: 27.1 km^{2} (10.5 sq mi)
- Elevation: 727 m (2,385 ft)

Population (December 2020)
  - Total: 8,972
  - Density: 331/km^{2} (857/sq mi)
- Time zone: UTC+01:00 (CET)
  - Summer (DST): UTC+02:00 (CEST)
- Postal code: 6314
- SFOS number: 1709
- ISO 3166 code: CH-ZG
- Surrounded by: Baar, Menzingen, Oberägeri, Sattel (SZ), Steinerberg (SZ), Walchwil, Zug
- Website: www.unteraegeri.ch

Unterägeri is a municipality in the canton of Zug in Switzerland.

== History ==
Aerial view by Walter Mittelholzer (1923)

Oberägeri is first mentioned in 1150 as Agregia. In 1538 it was mentioned as Ober Egere.

The first church in the valley was built in 876. After 1100, the land belonged to the monastery on Einsiedeln, and was influenced by the Battle of Morgarten.

The municipality came into existence in the 15th century. Around 1500, several chapels and the first government building were built in Oberägeri. In 1669 the municipality gained the right to elect its own priest. In 1726 the church was burgled. In 1766 the governments of Oberägeri and Unterägeri (at the time known as Wilägeri) became involved in an open fight during local parliamentary sessions, and the two municipalities split in 1798.

== Geography ==
Unterägeri has an area, as of 2006, of 25.6 km^{2} (9.9 sq mi). Of this area, 37.1% is used for agricultural purposes, while 54.3% is forested. Of the rest of the land, 6.7% is settled (buildings or roads) and the remainder (1.8%) is non-productive (rivers, glaciers or mountains).

It is situated at the western shore of the Ägerisee. Known as Wilägeri, an outlying settlement of Ägeri, the community split in 1798, at the formation of the Helvetic Republic, into two municipalities, Oberägeri and Unterägeri. Mittenägeri lies between the two villages, on the territory of Unterägeri.

Originally smaller than Oberägeri, Unterägeri grew more quickly during Industrialisation, lying at the road from Zug to Schwyz, and it is now significantly larger than Oberägeri.

== Demographics ==
Unterägeri has a population (as of 31 December 2020) of 8,972. As of 2007, 19.7% of the population was made up of foreign nationals. Over the last 10 years the population has grown at a rate of 15.8%. Most of the population (as of 2000) speaks German (87.8%), with Serbo-Croatian being second most common (2.6%) and English being third (1.7%).

In the 2007 federal election the most popular party was the SVP which received 32% of the vote. The next three most popular parties were the CVP (26.8%), the FDP (21.3%) and the Green Party (13.1%).

In Unterägeri about 74.1% of the population (between age 25-64) have completed either non-mandatory upper secondary education or additional higher education (either university or a Fachhochschule).

Unterägeri has an unemployment rate of 1.63%. As of 2005, there were 178 people employed in the primary economic sector and about 61 businesses involved in this sector. 736 people are employed in the secondary sector and there are 78 businesses in this sector. 1,587 people are employed in the tertiary sector, with 267 businesses in this sector.
