= Estadio Nacional Complutense =

Sporting stadium in Madrid

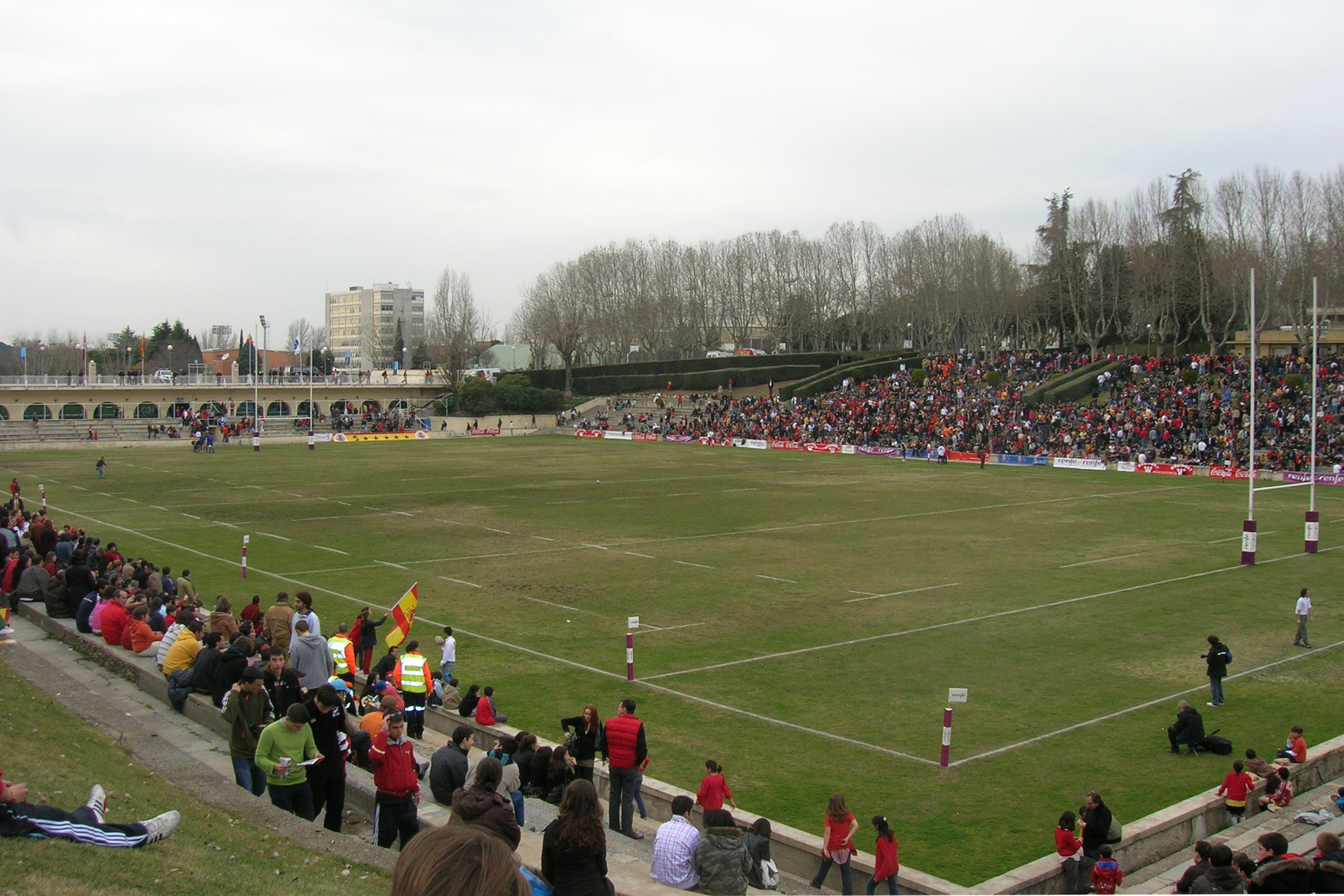
- Overview of the National Stadium Complutense
- Interactive map of Estadio Nacional Complutense
- Location: Madrid, Spain
- Coordinates: 40°26′16″N 3°43′43″W
- Owner: Complutense University
- Operator: Complutense University
- Capacity: 6,000
- Surface: Grass
- Field size: 123 m × 76 m (404 ft × 249 ft)

Construction
- Opened: 12 October 1943
- Architect: Luis Lacasa Navarro / Javier Barroso / Eduardo Torroja

Tenants
- Spanish national rugby union team Olympus Rugby XV Madrid; CD Arquitectura; CR Cisneros

The Estadio Nacional Complutense (or Complutense National Stadium in English) is a rugby union stadium in the Spanish capital Madrid and located on the main campus of the Complutense University of Madrid. The stadium is commonly used by the Spanish national rugby union team who competes in the European Nations Cup. It is also home to Olympus Rugby XV Madrid, CD Arquitectura and CR Cisneros.

== History ==
The plans for the construction of the University City (Spanish: Ciudad Universitaria), and thus also of rugby stadium, began on 17 May 1927, when the then King Alfonso XIII awarded the construction contract. The official architects of the venue were Luis Lacasa Navarro, Javier Barroso and the famous Civil engineer Eduardo Torroja. The opening ceremony of the sports facilities and the stadium was on 12 October 1943, on the Spanish national holiday.

Originally, the stadium was built for university sports, but in 1954 the Spanish national rugby union team used the stadium for a home match against Portugal, Spain won 23-0. Following the high number of spectators, the stadium was made the home stadium for the men's rugby team, hosting all home matches in the European Nations Cup and any friendly's that occur during the Mid-year rugby union tests or the End-of-year rugby union tests.

== Gallery ==
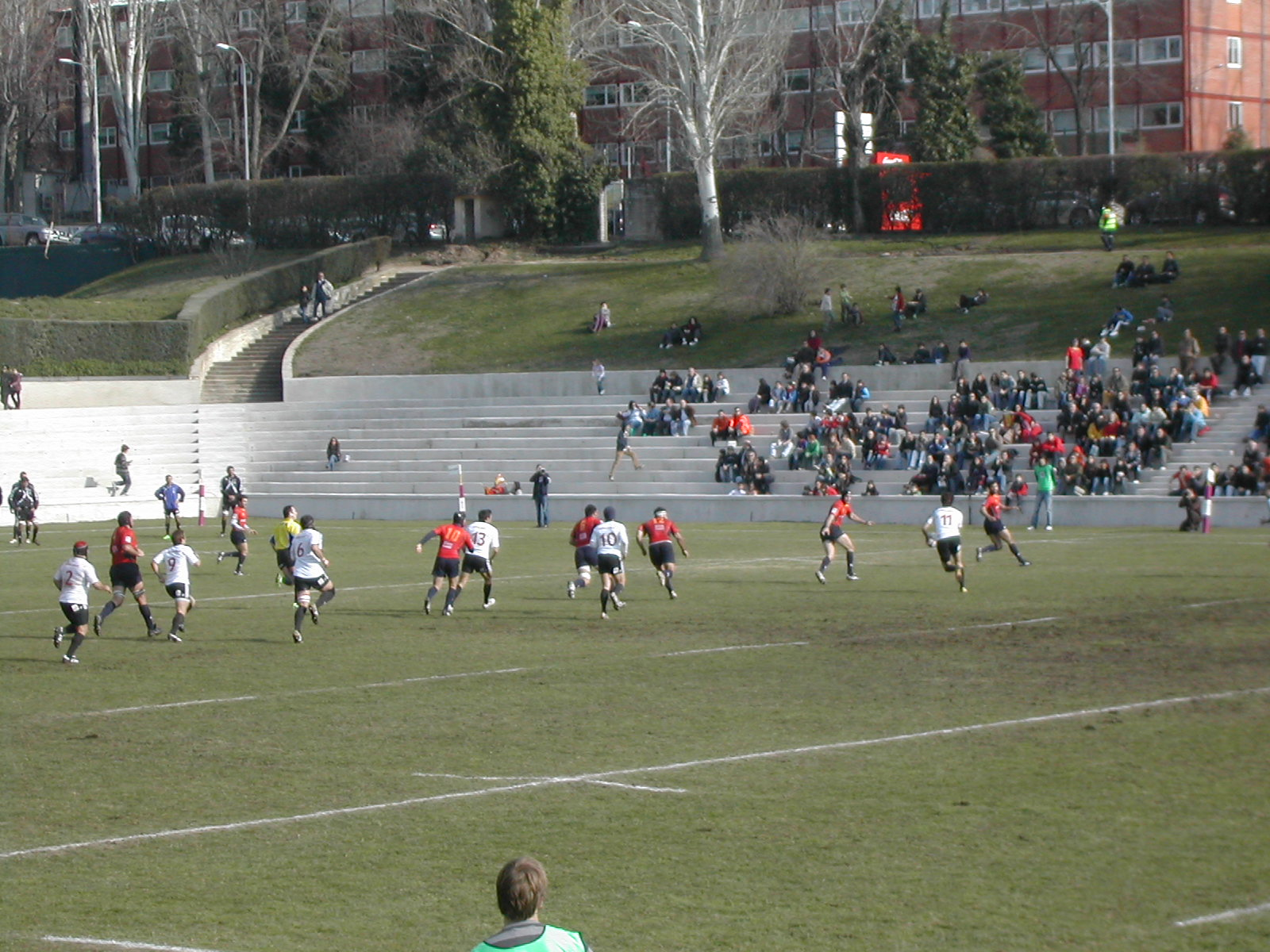
A phase of a rugby union match between Spain and Portugal.

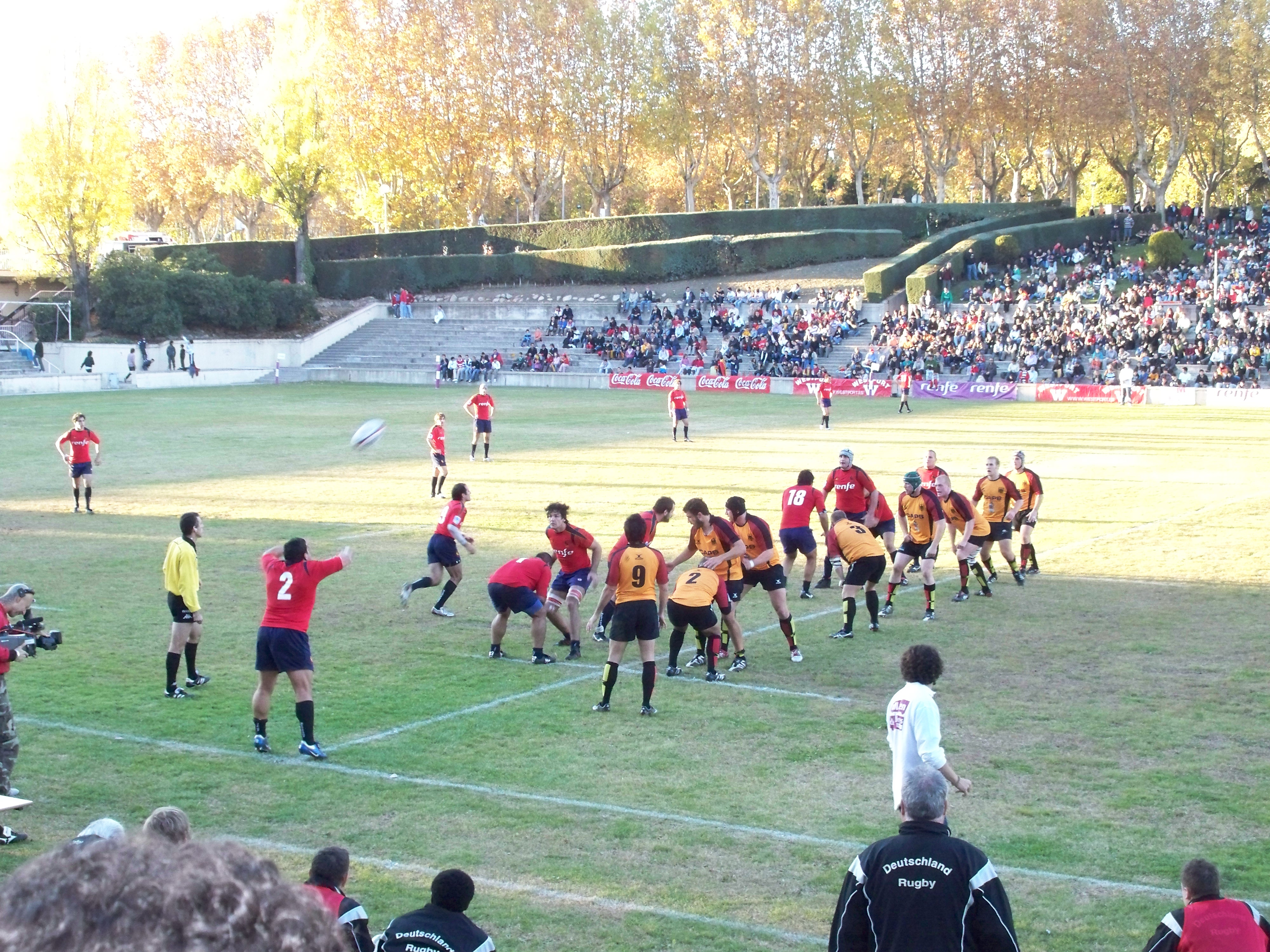
A line out between Spain and Germany.

== See also ==
- Rugby union in Spain
- Spanish Rugby Federation
