= Germany women's national rugby union team =

Team representing Germany in women's international rugby competitions

Germany
- Emblem: Bundesadler (Federal Eagle)
- Union: German Rugby Federation
- Head coach: Pierre Mathurin
- Captain: Mette Zimmat
- Home stadium: RG Heidelberg
First colours	Second colours

World Rugby ranking
- Current: 20 (as of 6 April 2026)
- Highest: 19 (2018)

First international
- West Germany 0–8 Sweden (West Berlin, West Germany 14 October 1989)

Biggest win
- Germany 75–0 Norway (Amsterdam, Netherlands 8 May 2003)

Biggest defeat
- New Zealand 134–6 Germany (Amsterdam, Netherlands 2 May 1998)

World Cup
- Appearances: 2 (First in 1998)

The Germany women's national rugby union team are a national sporting side of Germany, representing them at rugby union. They made their first Rugby World Cup appearance at the 1998 tournament in the Netherlands, and made their last appearance at the 2002 Rugby World Cup in Spain. They regularly compete in the Rugby Europe Women's Championship.

== History ==
The German women's national rugby union team was founded in 1989. Back then women's rugby was still part of the "Deutsche Rugby Jugend", the youth rugby organization in Germany. After only 2 training camps in Wiedenbrück and Hannover a team was formed with players from BSV 92 Berlin, DRC Hannover, RK Heusenstamm, SC Neuenheim, TV Wiedenbrück and SV 08 Ricklingen. For their first international match the German women met Sweden in Berlin in 1989 and lost only 0–8, and went on to qualify for the next two World Cups.

However German national teams (fifteens and sevens) have suffered from limited financial support, and after the European Championship finals in April 2005 (where Germany finished fourth) the DRV officially disbanded the XVs national team for financial reasons. Though this was reversed a year later at the next General Assembly of the DRV, it was a set-back and Germany have struggled to keep up with their neighbours in this form of the game.

Having played their last test match in 2010, Germany returned to test rugby in 2016 after a long six-year absence. In 2019 Germany withdrew from the European Championships due to financial difficulties.

== Records ==
=== Rugby World Cup ===
Rugby World Cup
Year	Round	Position	Pld	W	D	L	PF	PA	Squad
(Wales) 1991	Did Not Enter								
(Scotland) 1994	Did Not Enter								
(Netherlands) 1998	Shield Final	14th	5	1	0	4	46	308	Squad
(Spain) 2002	15th Place Playoff	16th	4	0	0	4	19	232	Squad
(Canada) 2006	Did Not Enter								
(England) 2010	Did Not Qualify								
(France) 2014	Did Not Qualify								
(Ireland) 2017	Did Not Qualify								
(New Zealand) 2021	Did Not Qualify								
(England) 2025	Did Not Qualify								
(Australia) 2029	TBD								
(United States) 2033	TBD								
Total	2/9	14th^{†}	9	1	0	8	65	540	
Champion Runner-up Third place Fourth place: * Tied placing ^{†} Best placing / Home venue

=== Overall ===
(Full internationals only)

Rugby: Germany internationals 1989-
Opponent	First game	Played	Won	Drawn	Lost	Percentage
Belgium	2001	4	3	1	0	87.50%
Denmark	2004	1	1	0	0	100.00%
England	1997	1	0	0	1	0.00%
Finland	2007	2	2	0	0	100.00%
France	1997	1	0	0	1	0.00%
Ireland	1997	3	0	0	3	0.00%
Italy	1996	7	0	0	7	0.00%
Kazakhstan	1993	4	1	0	3	25.00%
Luxembourg	2007	1	1	0	0	100.00%
Netherlands	1992	17	1	0	16	5.89%
Norway	2003	3	3	0	0	100.00%
Russia	2010	1	0	0	1	0.00%
Spain	1996	2	0	0	2	0.00%
New Zealand	1998	2	0	0	2	0.00%
Romania	2007	1	1	0	0	100.00%
Sweden	1989	10	3	0	7	30.00%
Switzerland	2016	2	2	0	0	100.00%
Wales	1998	2	0	0	2	0.00%
Summary	1989	64	18	1	45	28.13%

== Players ==
Germany's 23-player squad for the 2024–25 Rugby Europe Women's Trophy.

Player	Position
Tina Schucker	Prop
Emma Dehnert	Hooker
Mareike Bier	Prop
Luise Lauter	Lock
Salome Trauth	Lock
Muriel Weigel	Flanker
Joy Weatherspoon	Flanker
Yusra Abdelkarim	Number 8
Annika Nowotny	Scrum-half
Charlotte Malaizier	Fly-half
Sarah Hiltrud Piepkorn	Wing
Mette Zimmat	Centre
Johanna Hacker	Centre
Steffi Gruber	Wing
Sophie Hacker	Fullback
Substitution
Esther Tilgner	Forward
Annika Solveig Bergemann	Forward
Melissa Paul	Forward
Nina Schäfer	Forward
Amelie Harris	Forward
Ronja Hinterding	Back
Emilia Hacker	Back
Paula Schult	Back

== See also ==
- Rugby union in Germany
- German women's rugby (in German)
