= Switzerland women's national rugby union team =

Women's national team representing in Rugby

Switzerland
- Union: Swiss Rugby Union
- Head coach: Mikey Conway; Stephan Faivre
| First colours | Second colours |

World Rugby ranking
- Current: 59 (as of 2 March 2026)
- Highest: 55
- Lowest: 59 (2026)

First international
- Belgium 7–15 Switzerland (Brussels; 04 September 2011)

Biggest win
- Switzerland 80–0 Finland (Sportanlage Schönenbüel, Unterägeri; 08 March 2014)

Biggest defeat
- Finland 80–0 Switzerland (Hamarin Sports Ground, Porvoo; 28 May 2022)

The Switzerland women's national rugby union team are a national sporting side of Switzerland, representing them at rugby union.

== History ==
Although Switzerland was a regular entrant in the European sevens tournaments from 2003, it was not until 2009 that they formed a fifteens team. In 2011, after two years playing only against club sides from neighbouring countries, Switzerland became the 56th international test match playing team when they played Belgium at Kituro Rugby Club, Schaerbeek, near Brussels.

The team for the first test match was:

Atkinson, Bauer, Buob, Casparis, Da Silva, Diener, Hart, Haymoz, Herrmann, Hodel, Huerlimann, Kehl, Kehrli, Mancini, Martinot, Mc Namara, Munstermann, Oriwall, Reischauer (C), Sax, Ullmann, Walti. Coaches: Muehlhofer, Prébandier.

The Swiss Women's XV integrated the Europe Trophy championship in 2014.

The women's team was dropped from the Europe Trophy in 2022 due to budget constraints and played only friendly matches. It took tremendous effort from the staff, especially the team manager Nicole Imsand, to prove that the women's team still deserved support, and a spot at the international level. The women's XV hadn't scored in international matches since 2019. After test matches against France militaire and Germany, the women's XV team had proved their potential. In 2026, they were integrated into the Europe Conference championship.

== Current coaching staff ==
The current coaching staff of the Womens Swiss national team:

| Name | Nationality | Role |
|---|---|---|
| Nicole Imsand | SUI | Manager |
| Mikey Conway | (Wales) WAL | coach |
| Stephan Faivre | (France) FRA | Coach |
| Marcel Grebowski | SUI | Physiotherapist |
| Anne | SUI | Physiotherapist |

== Results summary ==
(Full internationals only, updated to 24 April 2023)

Switzerland Internationals From 2011
| Opponent | First Match | Played | Won | Drawn | Lost | For | Against | Win % |
|---|---|---|---|---|---|---|---|---|
| Belgium | 2011 | 3 | 1 | 0 | 2 | 40 | 82 | 33.33% |
| Czech Republic | 2013 | 7 | 4 | 0 | 3 | 135 | 82 | 57.14% |
| Finland | 2012 | 5 | 4 | 0 | 1 | 147 | 90 | 80.00% |
| Germany | 2016 | 2 | 0 | 0 | 2 | 0 | 65 | 0.00% |
| Netherlands | 2014 | 2 | 0 | 0 | 2 | 0 | 94 | 0.00% |
| Russia | 2014 | 3 | 1 | 0 | 2 | 51 | 94 | 33.33% |
| Sweden | 2022 | 1 | 0 | 0 | 1 | 0 | 48 | 0.00% |
| Summary | 2011 | 23 | 10 | 0 | 13 | 373 | 555 | 43.48% |
