= Sweden women's national rugby union team =

Sweden
- Union: Swedish Rugby Union
- Head coach: Tamara Taylor
- Captain: Amanda Swartz
First colours

World Rugby ranking
- Current: 21 (as of 22 September 2025)
- Highest: 10 (2003)
- Lowest: 21 (2025)

First international
- Sweden 34-0 Netherlands (Malmö, Sweden 1984)

Biggest win
- Sweden 67-0 Russia (Enkoping, Sweden 3 May 2012)

Biggest defeat
- United States 111-0 Sweden (Melrose, Scotland 11 April 1994)

World Cup
- Appearances: 4 (First in 1991)
- Best result: 10th (1994)

The Sweden women's national rugby union team are a national sporting side of Sweden, representing them at rugby union. The side first played in 1984.

== History ==
Sweden are considered one of the pioneers of women's test rugby. In 2017, they returned to the international 15s scene after a three-year absence.

Sweden won the 2021–2022 Rugby Europe Women's Trophy. In the opening match of the 2024 Rugby Europe Women's Championship they lost to the Netherlands, 59–0.

== Records ==
=== Overall ===
(Full internationals only)

Rugby: Sweden internationals 1984-
Opponent	First game	Played	Won	Drawn	Lost	Percentage
Belgium	1986	3	3	0	0	100.00%
Canada	2010	1	0	0	1	0.00%
Czech Republic	2021	1	1	0	0	100.00%
England	1988	3	0	0	3	0.00%
Finland	2011	4	4	0	0	100.00%
France	1991	4	0	0	4	0.00%
Germany	1989	10	7	0	3	70.00%
Italy	1991	8	3	0	5	37.50%
Japan	1991	2	1	0	1	50.00%
Kazakhstan	1994	4	0	0	4	0.00%
Netherlands	1984	17	3	0	14	17.65%
Norway	2006	1	1	0	0	100.00%
Portugal	2022	1	1	0	0	100.00%
Russia	1994	4	4	0	0	100.00%
Samoa	2013	1	0	0	1	0.00%
Scotland	1994	9	0	0	9	0.00%
Spain	2004	5	1	0	4	20.00%
Switzerland	2022	1	1	0	0	100.00%
United States	1994	1	0	0	1	0.00%
Wales	2007	3	1	0	2	33.33%
Summary	1984	83	31	0	52	37.34%

=== World Cup ===
Rugby World Cup
Year	Round	Position	Pld	W	D	L	PF	PA	Squad
(Wales) 1991	Plate Quarter-final	N/A	3	1	0	2	20	55	Squad
(Scotland) 1994	Plate Final	10th	6	2	0	4	63	206	
(Netherlands) 1998	15th Place Playoff	15th	5	1	0	4	46	209	Squad
(Spain) 2002	Did Not Participate								
(Canada) 2006	Did Not Participate								
(England) 2010	11th Place Playoff	12th	5	0	0	5	42	131	Squad
(France) 2014	Did Not Qualify								
(Ireland) 2017	Did Not Qualify								
(New Zealand) 2021	Did Not Qualify								
(England) 2025	Did Not Qualify								
(Australia) 2029	TBD								
(United States) 2033	TBD								
Total	4/10	10th^{†}	19	4	0	15	171	601	
Champion Runner-up Third place Fourth place: * Tied placing ^{†} Best placing / Home venue

== Players ==
Squad to the 2024 Rugby Europe Women's Championship.

Player	Position
Maja Meuller	Hooker
Hannah Persson	Hooker
Jennifer Sundqvist	Loosehead Prop
Pauline Sarg	Tighthead Prop
Marielle Andersson	Prop
Linn Olforser	Prop
Linnea Flyman	Lock
Cornelia Noren	Lock
Emma Ytterbom	Loose Forward
Elizabeth Sonnenholzner	Loose Forward
Elin Sterner	Loose Forward
Emma Wedervang	Forward
Emma Thönssen	Forward
Olivia Palmgren	Scrum-half
Linda Hakansson	First Five-Eighths
Tess Proos	Centre
Minonna Nunstedt	Centre
Sara Jacobsson	Wing
Isabell Wijkström	Wing
Amanda Swartz (c)	Fullback
Carina Trinh	Back
Hanna Borgemyr	Back
Sofya Smolina	Back

=== Coaching staff ===
Position	Name
Head Coach	Tamara Taylor
Assistant Coach	Phil Kearns
Manager	Rebecka Larsson
Team Doctor	Sofie Blume
Physio	Anabell Harris
Water Carrier	Nicklas Proos

== See also ==
- Rugby union in Sweden
