= Russia women's national rugby union team =

National rugby team

Russia
- Union: Rugby Union of Russia
- Head coach: Valerian Bagdasarov
First colours	Second colours

World Rugby ranking
- Current: 18 (as of 26 May 2025)
- Highest: 14 (2024)

First international
- Russia 0-66 England (11 April 1994)

Biggest win
- Russia 74-0 Bosnia and Herzegovina (21 May 2005)

Biggest defeat
- United States 84-0 Russia (2 May 1998); Scotland 84-0 Russia (17 May 2009)

World Cup
- Appearances: 2 (First in 1994)

The Russia women's national rugby union team are the national women's rugby union team of Russia. The side first played as "Russia" in 1994, but its predecessor, the Soviet Union women's national rugby union team played six matches between 1990 and 1991.

== History ==
Originally players from the Russian Soviet Socialist Republic represented the Soviet Union women's national rugby union team and competed at the 1991 Women's Rugby World Cup in Wales. Following the dissolution of the Soviet Union, Russia competed independently internationally and were invited to replace the Soviet Union team at the 1994 Women's Rugby World Cup. The Russian team did the same as the Soviet team did in the previous tournament and arrived in Scotland with boxes of vodka to barter for food and accommodation as they had none prebooked. The University of Edinburgh gave them free accommodation and Pizza Express sent them pizza every night. Russia were invited again to the 1998 Women's Rugby World Cup but have since failed to qualify for any subsequent edition.

After the 2022 Russian invasion of Ukraine, World Rugby and Rugby Europe suspended Russia from international and European continental rugby union competition. This came after a situation in the final of the 2022 Rugby Europe Women's Championship in Madrid against Spain, where the hosts refused to fly the Russian flag or play the Russian national anthem. Russia lost 27-0. In addition, the Rugby Union of Russia was suspended from World Rugby and Rugby Europe.

Women's World Rugby Rankings Top 20 rankings as of 6 April 2026
Rank	Change*	Team	Points
1	Steady	England	98.09
2	Steady	Canada	91.53
3	Steady	New Zealand	89.85
4	Steady	France	83.60
5	Steady	Ireland	78.20
6	Steady	Scotland	77.39
7	Steady	Australia	75.46
8	Steady	United States	72.90
9	Steady	Italy	72.37
10	Steady	South Africa	71.62
11	Steady	Japan	69.72
12	Steady	Wales	66.13
13	Steady	Fiji	63.98
14	Steady	Spain	62.42
15	Steady	Samoa	59.72
16	Steady	Hong Kong	57.56
17	Steady	Netherlands	57.42
18	Steady	Russia	55.10
19	Steady	Kazakhstan	53.88
20	▲1	Germany	51.10
*Change from the previous week

== Records (Russia) ==
=== Overall ===
(Full internationals only)

Rugby: Russia internationals 1994-
Opponent	First game	Played	Won	Drawn	Lost	Percentage
Belgium	2006	5	4	0	1	80.00%
Bosnia and Herzegovina	2005	2	2	0	0	100.00%
Czech Republic	2015	1	1	0	0	100.00%
England	1994	2	0	0	2	0.00%
Finland	2008	3	3	0	0	100.00%
Germany	2010	1	1	0	0	100.00%
Italy	1998	4	0	0	4	0.00%
Kazakhstan	1997	4	3	0	1	75.00%
Netherlands	1998	5	1	0	4	20.00%
Norway	2005	3	3	0	0	100.00%
Romania	2005	2	2	0	0	100.00%
Scotland	1994	2	0	0	2	0.00%
Spain	1997	2	0	0	2	0.00%
Sweden	1994	4	0	0	4	0.00%
Switzerland	2014	3	2	0	1	66.67%
United States	1998	1	0	0	1	0.00%
Wales	1994	2	0	0	2	0.00%
Summary	1994	46	22	0	24	47.83%

=== Rugby World Cup ===
Rugby World Cup
Year	Round	Position	Pld	W	D	L	PF	PA	Squad
(Wales) 1991	Competed as part of the Soviet Union								
(Scotland) 1994	Plate finals	11th	5	1	0	4	37	57	Squad
(Netherlands) 1998	Shield finals	16th	5	0	0	5	17	302	Squad
(Spain) 2002	Was Not Invited								
(Canada) 2006	Was Not Invited								
(England) 2010	Did Not Qualify								
(France) 2014	Did Not Qualify								
(Ireland) 2017	Did Not Qualify								
(New Zealand) 2021	Did Not Qualify								
(England) 2025	Did Not Qualify								
(Australia) 2029	TBD								
(United States) 2033	TBD								
Total	2/10	11th^{†}	10	1	0	9	54	359	
Champion Runner-up Third place Fourth place: * Tied placing ^{†} Best placing / Home venue

== See also ==
- Soviet Union women's national rugby union team
- Russia national rugby union team
