= Belgium women's national rugby union team =

Belgium
- Nickname: The Lionesses
- Union: Belgian Rugby Federation
- Head coach: Denis Duchau
First colours

World Rugby ranking
- Current: 24 (as of 26 May 2025)
- Highest: 15 (2003)
- Lowest: 27 (2023)

First international
- Belgium 0–32 Sweden (Brussels; 31 December 1986)

Biggest win
- Belgium 73–0 Luxembourg (Leuven; 11 April 2007)

Biggest defeat
- Netherlands 105–0 Belgium (Amsterdam; 8 April 2001)

The Belgium women's national rugby union team are a national sporting side of Belgium, representing them at rugby union. The side first played in 1986.

== History ==
Belgium played their first international test against Sweden on 29 October 1986, they were defeated 32–0 in Brussels. They registered their biggest win of 73–0 in 2007 when they thrashed Luxembourg.

Belgium competed in the 2022–23 Rugby Europe Women's Trophy competition. They were beaten 71–5 in their first match against Portugal in Brussels. They also lost their second match to the Czech Republic 29–21 in Prague.

== Results summary ==
(Full internationals only, updated to 28 April 2023)

Belgium Internationals From 1986
Opponent	First Match	Played	Won	Drawn	Lost	For	Against	Win %
Czech Republic	2015	3	2	0	1	61	37	66.67%
France	1988	1	0	0	1	0	66	0.00%
Germany	2001	6	0	1	5	38	134	0.00%
Italy	2006	1	0	0	1	0	34	0.00%
Luxembourg	2007	1	1	0	0	73	0	100.00%
Netherlands	2000	11	1	0	10	54	640	9.09%
Norway	2006	1	1	0	0	41	0	100.00%
Portugal	2021	2	0	0	2	13	81	0.00%
Romania	2007	2	2	0	0	35	7	100.00%
Russia	2006	5	1	0	4	45	156	20.00%
Scotland	2009	1	0	0	1	0	71	0.00%
Serbia	2007	1	1	0	0	20	0	100.00%
Spain	2010	2	0	0	2	0	142	0.00%
Sweden	1986	3	0	0	3	0	154	0.00%
Switzerland	2011	3	2	0	1	82	40	66.67%
Summary	1986	43	11	1	31	462	1562	25.58%
