= 2009–10 KB Extraliga season =

The 2009–10 KB Extraliga competition was a Czech domestic rugby club competition operated by the Česká Rugbyová Unie (ČSRU). It began on August 29, 2009 with a match between Tatra Smíchov and Petrovice at the Stadion ragby Císařka in Prague, and continued through to the final at the Synot Tip Arena on June 19, 2010.

Bystrc and Zlín were promoted, with the former having won the KB První Liga in 2008 and the latter the promotion playoffs, while Havířov and Přelouč were relegated.

Both Bystrc and Zlín went directly back to the První Liga, after occupying the bottom two places on the log at the end of the season.

The final saw "home side" Slavia Prague narrowly beating defending champions Tatra Smíchov 11-10.

== Competition format ==
Each club played every other club twice, with matches being played over eighteen rounds.

== The teams ==
Location of teams in the KB Extraliga 2009–10

Team	Captain	Head coach	Stadium	Capacity
Bystrc	?	(Czech Republic) Pavel Vrána (player-coach)	Sportovní areá Ondreje Sekory	?
Dragon Brno	?	(Czech Republic) Jiří Šťastny and (Czech Republic) Milan Buryánek	?	?
Petrovice	?	(Czech Republic) Petr Oklešťek	?	?
Praga	(Czech Republic) Pavel Syrový	(Czech Republic) Eduard Krützner, Jr.	?	?
Říčany	?	(Czech Republic) Antonín Brabec	Stadion Josefa Kohouta	?
Slavia Prague	?	(Czech Republic) Jan Macháček and (Czech Republic) Vítek Chalupa	Ragbyove hřiště v Edenu	?
Sparta Prague	(Czech Republic) Luděk Bredler	(Czech Republic) Petr Michovský	Podvinný mlýn	?
Tatra Smíchov	?	(Czech Republic) Filip Vacek (player-coach)	Stadion ragby Císařka	?
Vyškov	(Czech Republic) Martin Hudák	(Czech Republic) Milan Wognitsch and (Czech Republic) Dušan Lodes	Areál Jana Navrátila	?
Zlín	(Czech Republic) Tomaš Novosád	(Czech Republic) Jan Tvrdoň (player-coach)	Stadion Mládeže	?

== Table ==
2009–10 KB Extraliga Table
	Club	Played	Won	Drawn	Lost	Points for	Points against	Points
1	Slavia Prague	18	16	0	2	650	208	77
2	Tatra Smíchov	18	16	0	2	759	151	76
3	Říčany	18	15	0	3	611	193	72
4	Sparta Prague	18	11	0	7	491	290	58
5	Praga	18	10	0	8	570	378	50
6	Dragon Brno	18	9	0	9	521	345	47
7	Vyškov	18	6	0	12	334	574	30
8	Petrovice	18	4	0	14	193	733	18
9	Bystrc	18	3	0	15	232	660	14
10	Zlín	18	0	0	18	141	970	1

== Schedule and results ==
From the official ČSRU site. Within each weekend, matches are to be listed in the following order:

1. By date.
2. If matches are held on the same day, by kickoff time.
3. Otherwise, in alphabetic order of home club.

=== Rounds 1 to 5 ===
Round 1

- 29 August, 11:00 — Tatra Smíchov 49 – 0 Petrovice
- 29 August, 14:00 — Praga 33 – 23 Vyškov
- 29 August, 14:00 — Slavia Prague 29 – 16 Dragon Brno
- 29 August, 14:00 — Sparta Prague 36 – 9 Bystrc
- 29 August, 15:00 — Říčany 46 – 9 Zlín

Round 2

- 12 September, 11:00 — Tatra Smíchov 17 – 0 Říčany
- 12 September, 14:00 — Bystrc 10 – 29 Slavia Prague
- 12 September, 14:00 — Vyškov 17 – 22 Sparta Prague
- 12 September, 14:00 — Zlín 10 – 29 Praga
- 12 September, 15:00 — Petrovice 5 – 50 Dragon Brno

Round 3

- 5 September, 13:00 — Říčany 45 – 7 Petrovice
- 19 September, 11:00 — Praga 16 – 28 Tatra Smíchov
- 19 September, 15:00 — Slavia Prague 30 – 13 Vyškov
- 20 September, 13:00 — Sparta Prague 50 – 3 Zlín
- 20 September, 15:00 — Dragon Brno 57 – 13 Bystrc

Round 4

- 26 September, 11:00 — Tatra Smíchov 48 – 0 Sparta Prague
- 26 September, 14:00 — Vyškov 8 – 47 Dragon Brno
- 26 September, 14:00 — Zlín 3 – 50 Slavia Prague
- 26 September, 15:00 — Petrovice 14 – 6 Bystrc
- 26 September, 15:00 — Říčany 23 – 18 Praga

Round 5

- 6 September, 15:00 — Dragon Brno 83 – 12 Zlín
- 3 October, 13:00 — Praga 61 – 0 Petrovice
- 3 October, 14:00 — Bystrc 19 – 30 Vyškov
- 3 October, 14:00 — Slavia Prague 20 – 18 Tatra Smíchov
- 3 October, 15:00 — Sparta Prague 22 – 23 Říčany

=== Rounds 6 to 10 ===
Round 6

- 10 October, 12:00 — Tatra Smíchov 40 – 21 Dragon Brno
- 10 October, 14:00 — Praga 20 – 23 Sparta Prague
- 10 October, 15:00 — Petrovice 0 – 39 Vyškov
- 10 October, 15:00 — Říčany 10 – 12 Slavia Prague
- 10 October, 15:00 — Zlín 15 – 20 Bystrc

Round 7

- 12 October, 12:00 — Bystrc P – P Tatra Smíchov
- 17 October, 14:00 — Dragon Brno 32 – 25 Říčany
- 17 October, 14:00 — Slavia Prague 31 – 12 Praga
- 17 October, 14:00 — Sparta Prague 41 – 8 Petrovice
- 17 October, 14:00 — Vyškov 67 – 0 Zlín

Round 8

- 24 October, 15:00 — Říčany 41 – 8 Bystrc
- 28 October, 11:00 — Sparta Prague 14 – 15 Slavia Prague
- 28 October, 11:00 — Tatra Smíchov 88 – 6 Vyškov
- 28 October, 12:00 — Praga 23 – 15 Dragon Brno
- 28 October, 13:00 — Petrovice 39 – 15 Zlín

Round 9

- 31 October, 14:00 — Bystrc 10 – 56 Praga
- 31 October, 14:00 — Dragon Brno 17 – 22 Sparta Prague
- 31 October, 14:00 — Slavia Prague 35 – 7 Petrovice
- 31 October, 14:00 — Vyškov 10 – 55 Říčany
- 31 October, 14:00 — Zlín 6 – 38 Tatra Smíchov

Round 10

- 7 November, 11:00 — Petrovice 0 – 67 Tatra Smíchov
- 7 November, 14:00 — Bystrc 6 – 33 Sparta Prague
- 7 November, 14:00 — Dragon Brno 12 – 33 Slavia Prague
- 7 November, 14:00 — Vyškov 10 – 50 Praga
- 7 November, 14:00 — Zlín 5 – 97 Říčany

=== Rounds 11 to 15 ===
Round 11

- 20 March, 13:00 — Praga 57 - 13 Zlín
- 20 March, 13:00 — Sparta Prague 31 - 0 Vyškov
- 20 March, 14:00 — Říčany 25 – 8 Tatra Smíchov
- 20 March, 14:00 — Slavia Prague 70 – 12 Bystrc
- 20 March, 15:00 — Dragon Brno 28 - 10 Petrovice

Round 12

- 27 March, 11:00 — Tatra Smíchov 41 - 8 Praga
- 27 March, 14:00 — Vyškov 6 - 45 Slavia Prague
- 27 March, 14:00 — Zlín 3 – 47 Sparta Prague
- 27 March, 14:30 — Petrovice 3 – 56 Říčany
- 27 March, 15:00 — Bystrc 10 – 41 Dragon Brno

Round 13

- 17 April, 14:00 — Bystrc 10 – 15 Petrovice
- 17 April, 14:00 — Praga 8 – 40 Říčany
- 17 April, 14:00 — Slavia Prague 109 – 0 Zlín
- 17 April, 15:00 — Dragon Brno 7 – 12 Vyškov
- 17 April, 15:00 — Sparta Prague 15 – 22 Tatra Smíchov

Round 14

- 4 April, 14:00 — Zlín 6 – 43 Dragon Brno
- 24 April, 11:00 — Tatra Smíchov 13 – 3 Slavia Prague
- 24 April, 14:00 — Říčany 19 - 15 Sparta Prague
- 24 April, 14:00 — Vyškov 19 – 30 Bystrc
- 24 April, 15:00 — Petrovice 13 – 52 Praga

Round 15

- 1 May, 13:00 — Sparta Prague 24 – 28 Praga
- 1 May, 14:00 — Bystrc 48 – 3 Zlín
- 1 May, 14:00 — Vyškov 31 – 8 Petrovice
- 1 May, 15:00 — Dragon Brno 13 – 20 Tatra Smíchov
- 1 May, 15:00 — Slavia Prague 6 – 13 Říčany

=== Rounds 16 to 18 ===
Round 16

- 8 May, 11:00 — Tatra Smíchov 78 – 0 Bystrc
- 8 May, 14:00 — Praga 19 – 22 Slavia Prague
- 8 May, 14:00 — Říčany 31 – 5 Dragon Brno
- 8 May, 14:00 — Zlín 10 – 27 Vyškov
- 8 May, 15:00 — Petrovice 12 – 59 Sparta Prague

Round 17

- 29 May, 11:00 — Vyškov 8 – 66 Tatra Smíchov
- 29 May, 13:30 — Zlín 18 – 32 Petrovice
- 29 May, 14:00 — Bystrc 3 – 29 Říčany
- 29 May, 14:00 — Slavia Prague 40 – 10 Sparta Prague
- 29 May, 15:00 — Dragon Brno 34 – 19 Praga

Round 18

- 11 April, 13:00 — Říčany 33 – 8 Vyškov
- 19 May, 18:30 — Sparta Prague 27 – 0 Dragon Brno
- 23 May, 13:00 — Tatra Smíchov 88 – 10 Zlín
- 23 May, 14:00 — Praga 64 – 18 Bystrc
- 23 May, 15:00 — Petrovice 20 – 41 Slavia Prague

== Playoffs ==
Semifinals
1	Slavia Prague	17
4	Sparta Prague	14
2	Tatra Smíchov	17
3	Říčany	14

Final
1	Slavia Prague	11
2	Tatra Smíchov	10

=== Semi-finals ===
12 June 2010
15:00

Slavia Prague	17 – 14	Sparta Prague
Try: Pešek; Šťastný; Vondrášek; Con: Fojtík (1/3)	Report (in Czech)	Try: Sulamanidze m Pen: Vokrouhlík 2, Schneider

Ragbyove hřiště v Edenu, Prague
Referee: Štěpán Čekal

12 June 2010
11:00

Tatra Smíchov	17 – 14	Říčany
Try: Petr Procházka; Rýdlo; Pavel Hocke; Con: Honner (1/3)	Report (in Czech)	Try: Čamrda c Rohlík c Con: Michovský (2/2)

Stadion ragby Císařka, Prague
Referee: Jaroslav Bednařík

=== Final ===
19 June 2010
17:00

Slavia Prague	11 - 10	Tatra Smíchov
Try: Michal Jirman m Pen: Fojtík 2	Report (in Czech)	Try: Rudolf c Con: Honner (1/1); Pen: Honner

Synot Tip Arena, Prague
Attendance: 2,000
Referee: Tomáš Tůma

Preceded by 2008	KB Extraliga season 2009–10	Succeeded by 2010–11
