= List of rugby clubs in the Czech Republic =

This is a list of rugby teams in the Czech Republic, as per the 2009/2010 season.

== KB Extraliga ==
- RC Bystrc
- RC Dragon Brno
- RK Petrovice
- Praga Rugby
- RC Říčany
- RC Slavia Prague
- RC Sparta Prague
- RC Tatra Smíchov
- RC Vyškov
- RC Zlín

== KB První Liga ==
- RC Havířov
- ARC Iuridica
- RC Olomouc
- Praga Rugby B
- RC Přelouč
- RC Slavia Prague B
- TJ Sokol Mariánské Hory

== Non-league ==
- RC Písek
- RK Strakonice
