= 2008 KB Extraliga season =

The 2008 KB Extraliga Competition was a Czech domestic rugby club competition, operated by the Česká Rugbyová Unie (ČSRU). It began on August 16, 2008 with a match between Tatra Smíchov and Petrovice at the Stadion ragby Císařka in Prague, and ended with the final on November of that year with Tatra Smíchov beating Říčany 17-9 played on Synot Tip Arena in Prague.

Praga and Přelouč were added, increasing the number of teams to 10 from the 8 of the previous season.

Unlike most other years, the league was played over the course of only one year.

== Table ==
2008 KB Extraliga Table
	Club	Played	Won	Drawn	Lost	Points for	Points against	Points
1	Tatra Smíchov	9	9	0	0	377	81	44
2	Slavia Prague	9	7	0	2	277	127	35
3	Říčany	9	7	0	2	308	133	34
4	Praga	9	6	0	3	364	170	30
5	Dragon Brno	9	5	0	4	191	166	26
6	Petrovice	9	4	0	5	220	165	20
7	Havířov	9	3	0	6	127	341	14
8	Sparta Prague	8	2	0	6	152	251	11
9	Vyškov	8	1	0	7	104	306	5
10	Přelouč	9	0	0	9	64	444	1

== Schedule and results ==
From the official ČSRU site. Within each weekend, matches are to be listed in the following order:

1. By date.
2. If matches are held on the same day, by kickoff time.
3. Otherwise, in alphabetic order of home club.

=== Rounds 1 to 5 ===
Round 1

- 16 August, 11:00 — Tatra Smíchov 31 - 0 Petrovice
- 16 August, 15:00 — Říčany 46 - 3 Přelouč
- 16 August, 15:00 — Slavia Prague 12 - 6 Havířov
- 16 August, 15:00 — Sparta Prague 5 - 25 Dragon Brno
- 17 August, 14:00 — Praga 53 - 26 Vyškov

Round 2

- 23 August, 14:00 — Petrovice 13 - 17 Praga
- 23 August, 15:00 — Havířov 8 - 31 Tatra Smíchov
- 23 August, 15:00 — Říčany 7 - 28 Slavia Prague
- 23 August, 16:00 — Přelouč 6 - 32 Dragon Brno
- 19 October, — Vyškov 14 - 54 Sparta Prague

Round 3

- 30 August, 11:00 — Tatra Smíchov 37 - 27 Říčany
- 30 August, 14:00 — Praga 75 - 28 Havířov
- 30 August, 15:00 — Slavia Prague 48 - 13 Přelouč
- 31 August, 15:00 — Sparta Prague 27 - 8 Petrovice
- 2 September, 18:00 — Dragon Brno 31 - 15 Vyškov

Round 4

- 6 September, 14:00 — Havířov 27 - 20 Sparta Prague
- 6 September, 14:00 — Přelouč 13 - 19 Vyškov
- 6 September, 14:00 — Slavia Prague 17 - 32 Tatra Smíchov
- 6 September, 15:00 — Říčany 24 - 14 Praga
- 7 September, 14:00 — Petrovice 12 - 17 Dragon Brno

Round 5

- 13 September, 11:00 — Tatra Smíchov 91 - 6 Přelouč
- 13 September, 14:00 — Praga 21 - 27 Slavia Prague
- 13 September, 14:00 — Vyškov 6 - 22 Petrovice
- 13 September, 15:00 — Dragon Brno 41 - 22 Havířov
- 13 September, 16:00 — Sparta Prague 15 - 39 Říčany

=== Rounds 6 to 9 ===
Round 6

- 20 September, 11:00 — Havířov 12 - 7 Vyškov
- 20 September, 15:00 — Přelouč 0 - 43 Petrovice
- 20 September, 15:00 — Říčany 35 - 3 Dragon Brno
- 20 September, 15:00 — Slavia Prague 36 - 6 Sparta Prague
- 21 September, 16:00 — Tatra Smíchov 15 - 8 Praga

Round 7

- 27 September, 13:00 — Praga 78 - 8 Přelouč
- 27 September, 14:00 — Petrovice 102 - 0 Havířov
- 27 September, 14:00 — Vyškov 17 - 46 Říčany
- 27 September, 15:00 — Dragon Brno 18 - 14 Slavia Prague
- 27 September, 15:00 — Sparta Prague 3 - 38 Tatra Smíchov

Round 8

- 4 October, 14:00 — Praga 73 - 23 Sparta Prague
- 4 October, 14:00 — Tatra Smíchov 34 - 12 Dragon Brno
- 4 October, 15:00 — Říčany 46 - 10 Petrovice
- 4 October, 16:00 — Přelouč 12 - 34 Havířov
- 4 October, 15:00 — Slavia Prague 66 - 14 Vyškov

Round 9

- 11 October, 14:00 — Havířov 6 - 41 Říčany
- 11 October, 14:00 — Sparta Prague 53 - 3 Přelouč
- 11 October, 14:00 — Vyškov 0 - 68 Tatra Smíchov
- 11 October, 15:00 — Dragon Brno 22 - 23 Praga
- 11 October, 14:30 — Petrovice 10 - 31 Slavia Prague

=== Semi-finals ===
2008-10-25
11:00

Tatra Smíchov	18 – 15	Praga
Tries: Honner; Oswald; Rygl; Con: Pen: Honner	(Report)	Tries: Kudrna; Jung; Con: Kudrna (1/2); Pen: Kudrna

Stadion ragby Císařka, Prague
Referee: Tomáš Tůma (Czech Republic)

2008-10-25
15:00

Slavia Prague	3 – 5	Říčany
Tries: Con: Pen: Kolář	(Report)	Try: Čamrda

Ragbyove hřiště v Edenu, Prague
Referee: Jaroslav Bednařík (Czech Republic)

=== Final ===
2008-11-08

Tatra Smíchov	17 – 9	Říčany
Try: Procházka; Con: Pen: Honner		Tries: Con: Pen: Nevický x3

Synot Tip Arena, Prague
Referee: Jaroslav Bednařík (Czech Republic)
