= Antonín Brabec (rugby union) =

- Born: 2 June 1973 (age 53) Prague, Czechoslovakia
- Height: 1.80 m (5 ft 11 in)
- Weight: 95 kg (14 st 13 lb)
- Notable relative: Marek Kincl (cousin)

Rugby union career
- Position(s): Inside centre, outside centre, fly-half
Youth career
- RC Tatra Smíchov
Amateur team(s)
Years	Team	Apps	(Points)
1990–1993	RC Tatra Smíchov		
1993–1994	VTJ Pardubice		
1994–1997	RC Tatra Smíchov		
1997–1998	RC Tatra Smíchov (→Cliffton RFC – England)		
1998–1999	RC Tatra Smíchov (→Marlow RFC – England)		
1999–2001	RC Tatra Smíchov (→Avennir Lescarian – France)		
2001–2003	RC Tatra Smíchov		
2003–2005	Sporting Nazarien Rugby – France		
2005–2008	RC Tatra Smíchov		
2008–2013	RC Mountfield Říčany		
2013–2015	RC Sparta Praha		
2015	RK Petrovice		
2016	RC Tatra Smíchov		
2016–2019	RC Mountfield Říčany		
2020	RC Tatra Smíchov		
International career
Years	Team	Apps	(Points)
1994–2014	Czech Republic	63	(107)
National sevens team
Years	Team		Comps
1996–2010	Czech Sevens		30
Coaching career
- Years: Team
- 2005–2006: RC Tatra Smíchov (Head Coach)
- 2006–2007: RC Tatra Smíchov (Ass. Coach)
- 2007: Czech Women 7s (Head Coach)
- 2008–2012: Czech 7s (Head Coach)
- 2008–2013: RC Mountfield Říčany (Head Coach)
- 2013–2015: RC Sparta Praha (Head Coach)
- 2014–2015: Czech 7s (Head Coach)
- 2015–2017: Czech U18 (Ass. Coach)
- 2016–2018: RC Mountfield Říčany (DoR)
- 2017–2019: Czech U20 (Head Coach)
- 2019: RC Mountfield Říčany (Ass. Coach)
- 2020–2022: RK Petrovice “(DoR, Head Coach)”
- 2023–2025: RC Praga Praha “(Ass. Coach, U19 Head Coach)”
- 2023–2025: Bohemia Rugby Warriors “(Co-Coach)”

Antonín Brabec (born 2 June 1973) is a Czech former rugby union player and the current rugby coach. His position on the field is on the centre or the fly half.

== Early career ==
Brabec was born on 2 June 1973 in Prague. He began playing rugby union in his hometown at the age of six for RC Tatra Smíchov. He played as a back. His father Antonín is former player, coach and president Tatra Smíchov.

== Rugby career ==
=== Rugby League ===
He played two matches for Czech Republic rugby league national team.

- 8 June 2006 – ČR XIII vs Pioneers BUSRL 8:29
- 12 August 2006 – ČR XIII vs Serbia 26:38 (Try Brabec)

== Player honours ==
=== Personal accolades ===
- Czech Rugby Player of the Year – 1995

=== Club accolades ===
- RC Tatra Smíchov
  - Czech Republic XV Champion – 1995, 1997, 2003, 2007
  - Czech Republic XV Cup – 1995, 1997, 2003, 2007
  - Czech Republic 7s Champion – 2007
- RC Mountfield Říčany
  - Czech Republic Champion XV – 2011, 2012
- RC Sparta Praha
  - Czech Republic 7s Champion -– 2014
  - Czech Republic XV Second place -– 2013
- RK Petrovice
  - Czech Republic XV Second place -– 2022
  - Czech Republic U12 Second place -– 2022
- RC Praga Praha
  - Czech Republic XV Second place -– 2024
  - Czech Republic XV U19 Third place -– 2024
  - Czech Republic 7s U18 Second place -– 2025

== Coaching career ==
=== Club ===
Year	Club	Post
2005–2006	Rugby Club Tatra Smíchov	Head coach
2006–2007	Rugby Club Tatra Smíchov	Assistant Coach
2008–2013	Rugby Club Mountfield Říčany	Head coach
2013–2015	Rugby Club Sparta Praha	Head coach
2016–2018	Rugby Club Mountfield Říčany	Head coach
2019	Rugby Club Mountfield Říčany	Assistant coach
2021–2022	Rugby Klub Petrovice	Head coach
2023–2025	Rugby Club Praga Praha	Assistant coach

=== National team ===
Year	Team	Post
2007	Czech Women 7s	Head coach
2008–2012	Czech 7s	Head coach
2014–2015	Czech 7s	Head coach
2015–2017	Czech under 18	Assistant coach
2017–2019	Czech under 20	Head coach
2023–2025	Czech under 23	Assistant coach

== Coaching honours ==
=== Personal accolades ===
- Czech Rugby Coach of the Year: 2010, 2011

=== Club accolades ===
- RC Tatra Smíchov
  - Czech Republic 7s Champion – 2007
- RC Mountfield Říčany
  - Czech Republic XV Champion – 2011, 2012
- RC Sparta Praha
  - Czech Republic Champion 7s – 2014
- RK Petrovice
  - Czech Republic XV Second place – 2022
  - Czech Republic XV U12 Second place – 2022
- RC Praga Praha
  - Czech Republic XV Second place – 2024
  - Czech Republic 7s U18 Third place – 2025

== See also ==
- Rugby union in the Czech Republic
- Czech Rugby Union
- Czech Republic national rugby team
- Czech Republic national rugby league team
