= Czech Republic national rugby union team =

National rugby union team

Czech Republic
- Union: Czech Rugby Union
- Head coach: Miroslav Němeček and Pavel Pala
- Captain: Marek Loutocký
First colours	Second colours

World Rugby ranking
- Current: 29 (as of 19 June 2026)

First international
- Czechoslovakia 5–21 Romania (22 May 1927); Andorra 6–3 Czech Republic (15 May 1993)

Biggest win
- Czech Republic 95–5 Croatia (7 April 2002)

Biggest defeat
- Italy 104–8 Czech Republic (18 May 1994)

World Cup
- Appearances: 0
- Website: www.rugbyunion.cz

The Czech Republic national rugby union team is the third tier rugby national team of the Czech Republic.

They first started playing as the Czech Republic in 1993 after the split of Czechoslovakia and now compete in the European Nations Cup. They have yet to qualify for the Rugby World Cup, but have entered the qualifiers since the 1995 edition. Rugby union in the Czech Republic is administered by the Czech Rugby Union. The sport is still amateur in the country, but there are several Czech players who are professionals in France, including Martin Jágr.

The best ranking in the world ranking was 24th place in 2005. The national side is ranked 36th in the world (as of 5 November 2019).

== History ==
In 2005, they took on Australian Super Rugby side the Waratahs in Prague, losing 3–94.

The nation played against Hong Kong at the Synot Tip Arena in Prague on 16 December 2009. They won 17–5. It was the final match for six players: Antonín Brabec, Jan Macháček, Jan Oswald, Pavel Syrový, Ladislav Vondrášek and Jan Žíla.

The Czech Republic were relegated from the European Nations Cup First Division to the Second Division in 2014, after finishing 6th in their group.

On 9 November 2016 The Czech Republic played in a historic match against the Barbarians to celebrate the Czech Rugby Union's 90th anniversary. The match was held at the Marketa Stadium in Prague. They lost the match to the Barbarians, 71–0.

== Record ==
=== World Cup ===
World Cup record								World Cup Qualification record					
Year	Round	P	W	D	L	F	A	P	W	D	L	F	A
(Australia) (New Zealand) 1987	Not Invited							Part of Czechoslovakia					
(United Kingdom) (Ireland) (France) 1991	did not qualify							Part of Czechoslovakia					
(South Africa) 1995	did not qualify							5	2	0	3	85	188
(Wales) 1999	did not qualify							4	1	0	3	80	105
(Australia) 2003	did not qualify							6	5	0	1	189	71
(France) 2007	did not qualify							10	3	0	7	164	306
(New Zealand) 2011	did not qualify							8	3	1	4	135	142
(England) 2015	did not qualify							10	2	0	8	142	310
(Japan) 2019	did not qualify							7	6	0	1	265	104
(France) 2023	did not qualify							Automatically eliminated					
Total	0/9	0	0	0	0	0	0	50	22	1	27	1060	1226

=== European Competitions Since 2000 ===
Season	Division	G	W	D	L	PF	PA	+/−	Pts	Pos
2000	European Nations Cup Third Division	4	4	0	0	119	73	+46	12	1st
2000-01	European Nations Cup Second Division	5	2	0	3	132	109	+23	9	5th
2003-04	European Nations Cup First Division	9	3	0	6	139	263	-124	15	5th
2004-06	European Nations Cup First Division	10	3	0	7	164	306	-142	16	5th
2006-08	European Nations Cup First Division	10	0	0	10	59	506	-447	10	6th
2008-10	European Nations Cup Second Division 2A	8	3	1	4	135	142	-7	15	3rd
2010-12	European Nations Cup First Division 1B	10	4	0	6	160	217	-57	20	5th
2012-14	European Nations Cup First Division 1B	10	2	0	8	142	310	-168	11	6th
2014-16	European Nations Cup Second Division 2A	8	6	1	1	192	119	+73	32	2nd
2016-17	Rugby Europe Conference 1 North	4	4	0	0	158	26	+132	20	1st
2017-18	Rugby Europe Trophy	5	3	0	2	93	120	-27	12	3rd
2018-19	Rugby Europe Trophy	5	0	0	5	59	205	-146	1	6th
2019-20	Rugby Europe Conference 1 North	2	2	0	0	100	7	+93	10	1st
2021-22*	Rugby Europe Conference 1 North	2	2	0	0	70	25	+45	10	1st

=== Overall ===
Below is a table of the representative rugby matches played by a Czech Republic national XV at test level up until 14 November 2026, updated after match with Lithuania.

Opponent	Played	Won	Lost	Drawn	% Won
Andorra	3	2	1	0	66.67%
Austria	1	1	0	0	100%
Barbarians	1	0	1	0	0%
Basque Country	1	0	1	0	0.00%
Belgium	7	2	4	1	28.57%
Brown University	1	1	0	0	100%
Catalonia	1	0	1	0	0%
Croatia	10	8	2	0	80%
Denmark	4	4	0	0	100%
Georgia	8	0	8	0	0%
Germany	10	2	8	0	20%
Hong Kong	1	1	0	0	100%
Hungary	4	4	0	0	100%
Israel	4	3	0	1	75%
Italy	1	0	1	0	0%
Latvia	4	4	0	0	100%
Lithuania	6	5	1	0	83.33%
Luxembourg	5	5	0	0	100%
Malta	3	3	0	0	100%
Mexico	1	1	0	0	100%
Moldova	8	4	4	0	50%
Morocco	1	0	1	0	0%
Netherlands	9	4	5	0	44.44%
Poland	17	7	9	1	41.18%
Portugal	10	0	10	0	0%
Romania	6	0	6	0	0%
Russia	8	2	6	0	25%
Slovenia	1	0	1	0	0%
Spain	9	2	7	0	22.22%
Sweden	10	5	5	0	50%
Switzerland	7	4	3	0	57.14%
Tunisia	1	0	1	0	0%
Ukraine	10	6	4	0	60%
(United States) USA South	1	1	0	0	100%
Total	173	81	86	4	46.82%

== Recent Matches ==
Matches played in the last 12 months

Matches

6 November 2021
13:00 CET (UTC+01)

(1 TBP) Czech Republic	31–13	Hungary
	Report

Stadion ragby Císařka, Prague
Attendance: 550
Referee: Eugeniu Procopi (Moldova)

27 November 2021
18:00 CET (UTC+01)

Luxembourg	12–39	Czech Republic (1TBP)

Stade de Luxembourg, Gasperich
Referee: Vaidotas Girdvainis (Lithuania)

== Current squad ==
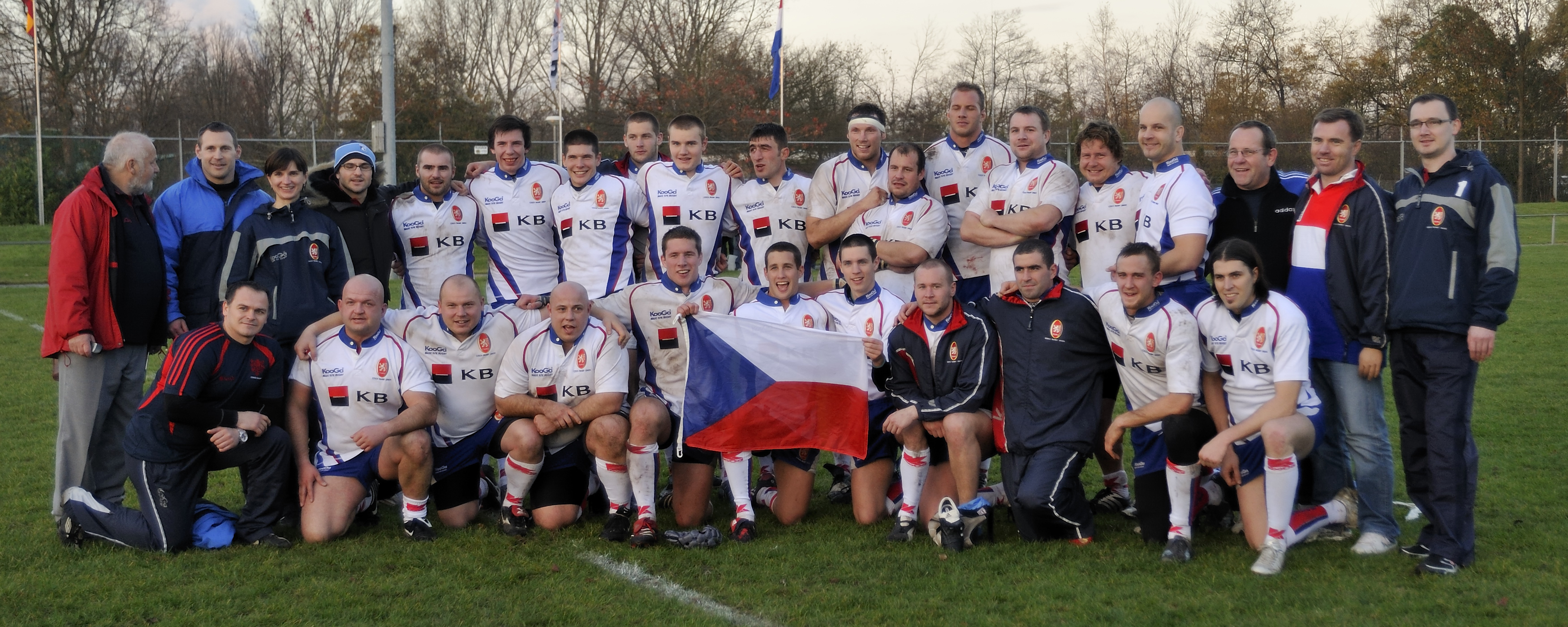
Netherlands v Czech Republic. Match in Amsterdam, 20 Nov 2010.

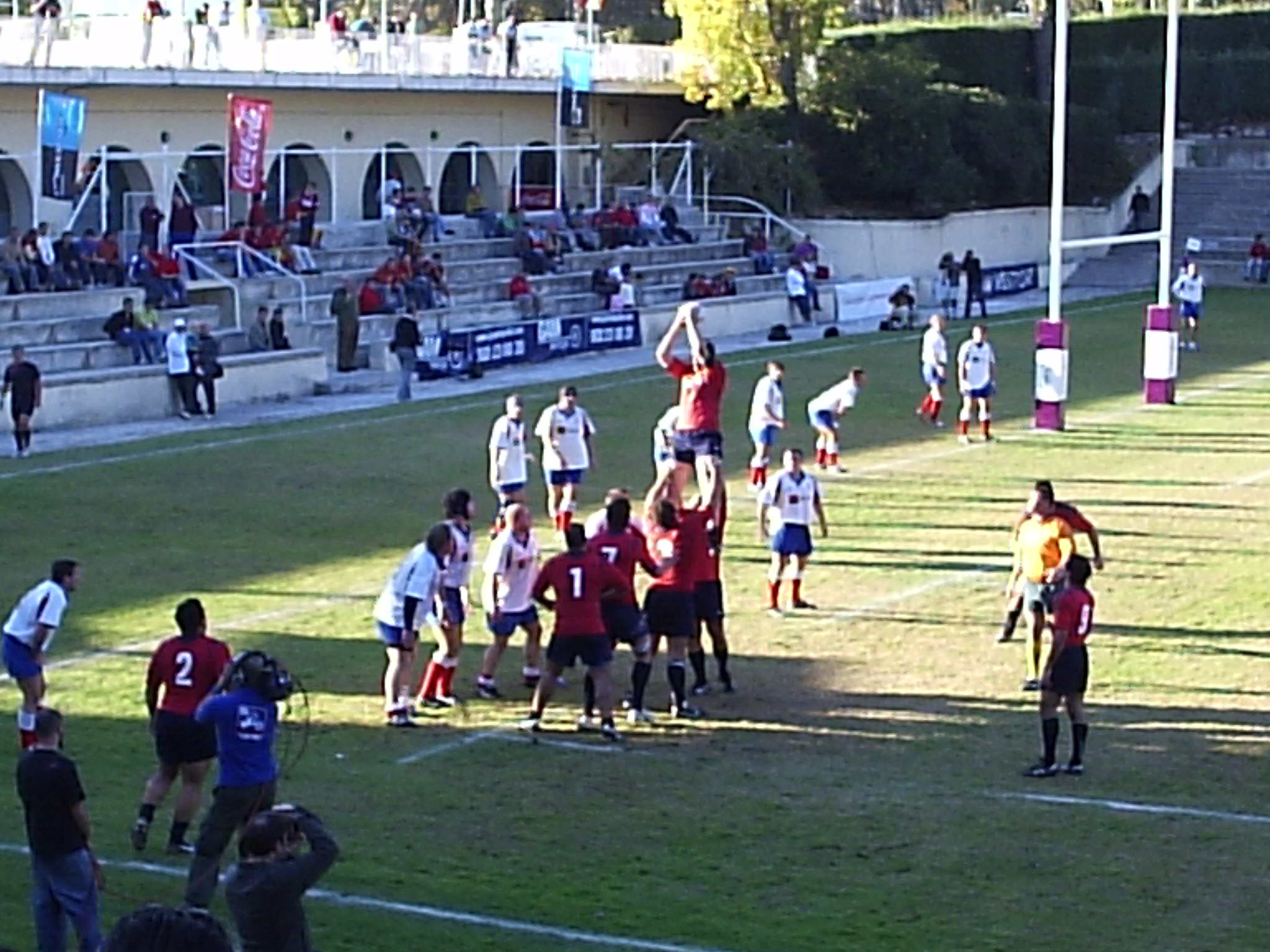
Spain vs. Czech Republic 11 November 2007, Madrid.

The following players were selected for the 2021-2022 Rugby Europe Conference 1 North match against Luxembourg on 27th November 2021.

Head Coach: (Czech Republic) Miroslav Němeček

Caps Updated:

Note: Flags indicate national union for the club/province as defined by World Rugby.

Player	Position	Date of birth (age)	Caps	Club/province
Tomáš Adámek	Prop	30 July 1999 (age 27)		(Czech Republic) Mountfield Říčany
Hubert Dřímal	Hooker	3 May 1996 (age 30)		(Czech Republic) Sparta Prague
Radek Novotný	Prop	8 August 1999 (age 27)		(Czech Republic) Praga Prague
Robert Trefný	Lock	28 September 1992 (age 34)		(Czech Republic) Mountfield Říčany
Jakub Homer	Lock	6 August 1992 (age 34)		(France) Valence Romans Drôme Rugby
James Faktor	Back row	8 January 1998 (age 28)		(England) Honourable Artillery Company
Vojtěch Vomáčka	Back row	16 October 1994 (age 32)		(France) Saint Marcellin Sports
Dan Hošek (c)	Number 8	8 December 1995 (age 30)		(Czech Republic) Praga Prague
Marek Šimák	Scrum-half	13 January 1992 (age 34)		(Czech Republic) Tatra Smíchov
Matyáš Hopp	Fly-half	3 October 1991 (age 35)		(Czech Republic) Praga Prague
Sheldon Fortuin	Wing	28 November 2002 (age 23)		(Czech Republic) Sparta Prague
Richard Hřebačka	Centre	22 March 1997 (age 29)		(Czech Republic) Sparta Prague
Albert Froněk	Centre	28 November 2001 (age 24)		(Czech Republic) Praga Prague
Jakub Čížek	Wing	1 January 1997 (age 29)		(Czech Republic) Přelouč
Martin Cimprich	Fullback	5 March 1999 (age 27)		(England) Honourable Artillery Company
Ondřej Kučera	Prop	30 November 2000 (age 25)		(Czech Republic) Dragon Brno
Tomáš Stránský	Hooker	15 May 1998 (age 28)		(Czech Republic) Mountfield Říčany
Václav Calta	Prop	11 December 1999 (age 26)		(Czech Republic) Mountfield Říčany
Vlastimil Diviš	Lock	28 November 2000 (age 25)		(Czech Republic) Praga Prague
Jan Tieber	Centre	18 November 2001 (age 24)		(Czech Republic) Dragon Brno
Jan Kohout	Wing	18 October 2000 (age 26)		(Czech Republic) Přelouč
Pavel Šíma	??	19 October 2000 (age 26)		(Czech Republic) Slavia Prague

== Coaches ==
Czech (Czechoslovakia) coaches
Name	Nationality	Years	Assistants	Tests	Won	Drew	Lost	Win %
Voska	Czechoslovakia	1931	-	1	0	0	1	0
Rudolf Otto Bauše	Czechoslovakia	1933	-	2	0	0	2	0
Kratochvíl	Czechoslovakia	1934	-	1	0	0	1	0
Gustav Vlk	Czechoslovakia	1946–49	-	4	1	0	3	25
Jiří Žižka	Czechoslovakia	1954	Vladimír Škvor	2	2	0	0	100
Vladimír Škvor	Czechoslovakia	1955	-	2	0	0	2	0
Alfa Zeda	Czechoslovakia	1956	Vladimír Škvor	1	0	0	1	100
Miloš Dobrý	Czechoslovakia	1956–57	-	5	1	0	4	20
Alfa Zeda	Czechoslovakia	1958–59	-	0	0	0	0	0
Oldřich Pazdera	Czechoslovakia	1959–65	-	0	0	0	0	0
Milan Pětroš	Czechoslovakia	1966–67	-	0	0	0	0	0
Vladimír Vondráček	Czechoslovakia	1969–1972	Viktor Šťastný	0	0	0	0	0
Vladimír Škvor	Czechoslovakia	1972–76	-	0	0	0	0	0
Eduard Krützner	Czechoslovakia	1976–78	-	2	2	0	0	100
Milan Malovaný	Czechoslovakia	1979–81	Bohumil Sláma	0	0	0	0	0
Milan Malovaný	Czechoslovakia	1982–83	-	0	0	0	0	0
Milan Malovaný	Czechoslovakia	1984–88	Jiří Kotlový	0	0	0	0	0
Milan Malovaný	Czechoslovakia	1988–1989	Vilibald Hervert	0	0	0	0	0
Eduard Krützner	Czechoslovakia	1989–90	Vilibald Hervert	0	0	0	0	0
Eduard Krützner	Czechoslovakia	1990–91	Bruno Kudrna, Milan Buriánek	0	0	0	0	0
Bruno Kudrna	Czechoslovakia	1991–93	Milan Buryánek	0	0	0	0	0
Bruno Kudrna	Czech Republic	1993–95	Milan Buryánek	0	0	0	0	0
Karel Berka	Czech Republic	1995–97	Jaromír Kourek	0	0	0	0	0
Bruno Kudrna	Czech Republic	1997–99	Václav Horáček	0	0	0	0	0
Václav Horáček	Czech Republic	1999–	Pavel Jágr	0	0	0	0	0
Jiří Šťastný	Czech Republic	2001–2003	Václav Čermák	0	0	0	0	0
Petr Michovský	Czech Republic	2003	Michel Bernardin (France)	0	0	0	0	0
Michel Bernardin	France	2003–2004	Jan Macháček	0	0	0	0	0
Christian Galonier	France	2004–2005	Jan Macháček	0	0	0	0	0
Josef Fatka	Czech Republic	2005–2006	Petr Michovský	0	0	0	0	0
Levan Mgeladze	Georgia	2007	Martin Kafka, Jan Macháček	0	0	0	0	0
Martin Kafka	Czech Republic	2007–2008	Jan Macháček	0	0	0	0	0
Christian Gajan	France	2008–2009	Martin Kafka	0	0	0	0	0
Martin Kafka	Czech Republic	2010–2013	Jan Oswald (2010–13), Tomasz Putra (2013)	0	0	0	0	0
Thomasz Putra	Poland	2014–2016	Roman Šuster	0	0	0	0	0
Thomasz Putra	Poland	2016–2017	Pavel Pala, Filip Vacek	0	0	0	0	0
Phil Pretorius	South Africa	2017–2018	Hein Kriek (South Africa) , Daniel Beneš	0	0	0	0	0
Daniel Beneš	Czech Republic	2018–2019	Miroslav Němeček, Roman Šuster	0	3	0	3	0
Miroslav Němeček & Pavel Pala	Czech Republic	2019–2020	0	0	0	0	0	0
Miroslav Němeček	Czech Republic	2021–	Jan Rohlík, Jan Čížek	0	0	0	0	0

== Notable former players ==
- Martin Jágr
- Jan Macháček
- Roman Šuster
- Martin Kafka
- Ladislav Vondrášek
- Antonín Brabec
- Jiří Skall
- Jan Žíla
- Miroslav Němeček
- Václav Jursík
- Pavel Vokrouhlík
- Jiří Buryánek
- Milan Mrtýnek
- Petr Michovský
- Pavel Bureš
- Luděk Kudláček
- Jiří Koutný
- Miroslav Fuchs
- Petr Skopal
- Jiří Skall st
- Jaromír Kourek
- Bruno Kudrna
- Karel Berka
- Vlastimil Jágr
- Václav Fanta
- Zdeněk Mrazčínský
- Barchánek

== See also ==
- Rugby union in the Czech Republic
- Czech Rugby Union
