= Rugby union in Czechoslovakia =

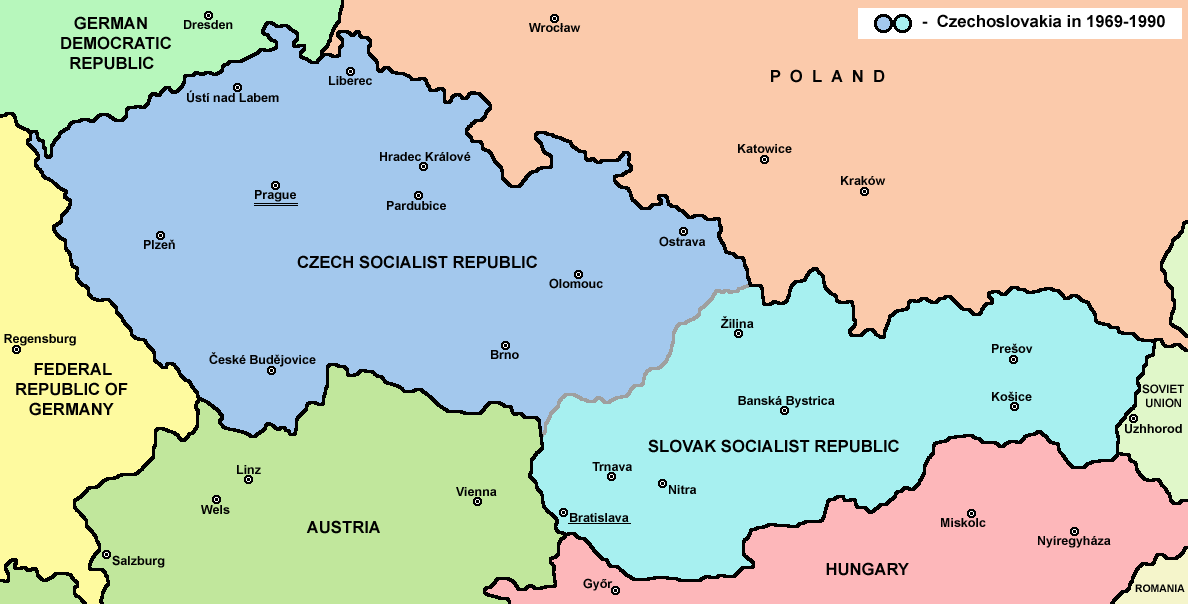
- Map of Czechoslovakia
- Country: Czechoslovakia
- National team: Czechoslovakia

National competitions
- Rugby World Cup; European Nations Cup; Rugby World Cup Sevens; IRB Sevens World Series

Club competitions
- Rugby Championship of Czechoslovakia

Rugby union in Czechoslovakia was a moderately popular sport. It was most popular in Moravia (especially Brno), Prague and Bratislava

== Governing body ==
Czechoslovakia was a founder member of FIRA in 1934, and joined the IRB in 1988.

Traditionally, Czech rugby has centred on a "section of the middle class" in and around Prague, which has been fairly small but fairly loyal to the sport.

== History ==
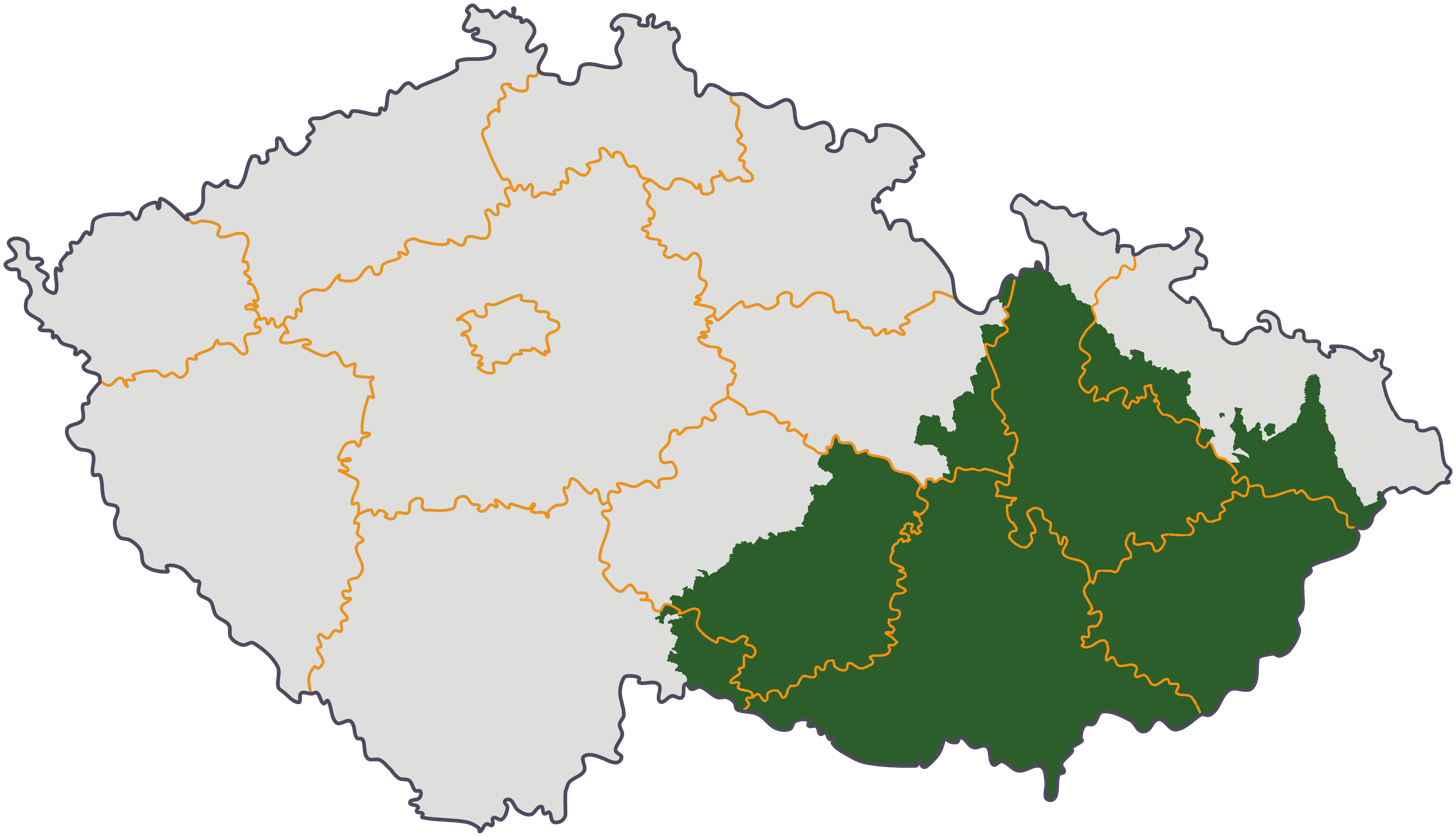
Moravia in relation to the current regions of the Czech Republic.

Rugby union was a moderately popular sport in Czechoslovakia

Josef Rössler-Ořovský, who introduced a number of sports in the then Czechoslovakia, among others skiing and tennis, was originally credited with starting rugby as well back in 1895. He went to England and brought back a rugby ball with him. Efforts were made to play the game at the Czech Yacht Club, but a public struggle ensued, and rugby subsequently never really caught on.

Rugby union was only properly introduced to the country by the writer Ondřej Sekora, when he returned from living in France in 1926, with a rugby ball and set of rules; he also coined Czech language rugby terminology. Brno, the Moravian capital is considered the cradle of rugby in Czechoslovakia, and is where the first match took place, between SK Moravská Slávie and AFK Žižka Brno, with the former winning 31–17. Both of these teams were trained by Sekora.

"Much to everyone's surprise, Eastern Bloc countries are among the game's vigorous participants, seemingly oblivious to rugby's capitalist class-ridden origins. Rumania, Poland and Czechoslovakia are members of the Federation Internationale de Rugby Amateur, the governing body for those countries not in the IB."

=== 1970s, 1980s and 1990s ===
Czechoslovakia was not invited to the first Rugby World Cup in 1987, and did not qualify for the second in 1991.

Rugby union, like many other sports, was long to be connected in the public mind with the less savoury aspects of Communism:

"In fact, since the end of the Second World War, the East European (and world communist) sports system was dominated by clubs of the security forces (often in Eastern Europe bearing the Soviet name Dinamo) and the armed forces. Most sports heroes, therefore, have officially been soldiers or police officers, guardians of public order and role models for a disciplined, obedient and patriotic citizenry. So to many people, elite sport was identified with paramilitary coercion."

=== Break up of Czechoslovakia ===
The breakup of Czechoslovakia led to the similar breakup of its sporting bodies, with separate Czech and Slovak teams etc.

== Domestic competition ==
- Rugby Championship of Czechoslovakia
- Soviet Cup (rugby)

== National team ==
The SFR Czechoslovakia side was, strictly speaking, a multinational side, consisting as it did of representatives of all the various nations within the SFR Czechoslovakia.

Its successor teams are the Czech Republic national rugby union team and the Slovakia national rugby union team.

== See also ==
- Czech Republic
  - Rugby union in the Czech Republic
  - Czech Republic national rugby union team
  - Czech Republic women's national rugby union team
  - Czech Republic national rugby union team (sevens)
  - Czech Rugby Union
- Slovakia
  - Rugby union in Slovakia
  - Slovakia national rugby union team
