= Martin Cimprich =

Czech Republic international rugby union player

- Full name: Martin Cimprich
- Born: 5 March 1999 (age 27) Prague, Czech Republic
- Height: 182 cm (6 ft 0 in)
- Weight: 82 kg (181 lb; 12 st 13 lb)
- School: Parktown Boys' High School
- University: Queen Margaret University

Rugby union career
- Position: Flyhalf, Winger, Fullback
- Current team: HAC RFC
Youth career
- 2010-2017: RC Mountfield Říčany
Senior career
Years	Team	Apps	(Points)
2016-2018	RC Mountfield Říčany	29	(140)
2018-2022	Queen Margaret University RFC	22	(112)
2018-2019	Musselburgh RFC	25	(35)
2019-2022	Boroughmuir Bears	18	(28)
2022	Musselburgh RFC	6	(21)
2022-	HAC RFC	28	(168)
- Correct as of 21 January 2024
Provincial / State sides
Years	Team	Apps	(Points)
2022	East Lothian	1	(5)
International career
Years	Team	Apps	(Points)
2014	Czech Republic under-16	-	(-)
2014-2016	Czech Republic under-18	-	(-)
2017-2018	Czech Republic under-20	3	(19)
2017-	Czech Republic	24	(171)
2019	Scottish Students	1	(0)
- Correct as of 21 January 2024

Martin Cimprich (born 5 March 1999) is a Czech rugby union player. His usual positions are flyhalf or fullback, and he currently plays for HAC RUFC in Regional 2 Thames in England.

== Club career ==
Cimprich began his career at RC Mountfeild Říčany, joining the senior side in 2017 playing in the Czech Extraliga ragby XV. In 2018 he moved to Scotland for University, playing for Musselburgh RFC and for Queen Margaret University RFC.

In 2019 he was joined Super 6 side Boroughmuir Bears, where he stayed for two seasons. Being named in the team of the week, for Round 9 of the 2021–22 Super 6. He was named the 2019 Czech Player of the Year, he is the youngest ever to win the award at just 20 years old.

In January 2022 he returned to Musselburgh RFC. Joining HAC RFC.

== International career ==
He played for the Czech Republic under-16, he was selected for the under-18 side at only 15. He also played for the under-20 side. At 17 he was called up to the national side. He featured for the Czech Republic XV, against the South Africa Barbarians, where he scored.

He made his full debut for the Czech Republic against Poland on the 28th October 2017. He helped the national side get promoted from Rugby Europe Conference 1 North, starting in the play-off match against Israel where he scored 5 conversions in a 69-12 win.

In 2019 he started at fullback in a match for the Scottish Students in a 31–3 defeat against Ireland Students. In 2022 he was selected to play for East Lothian against Co-Optimist Rugby Club.

== Honours ==
=== Personal ===
- Czech u16 Player of the Year: 2014
- Czech u18 Player of the Year: 2015, 2016
- Czech u20 Player of the Year: 2017
- Czech Player of the Year: 2019

=== Czech Republic ===
- Rugby Europe Conference: 2022–23
