= Suster =

The surname Suster may refer to:

- Mark Suster, American entrepreneur
- Gerald Suster (1951–2001), British historian and writer
- Ron Suster, American politician and lawyer
- Bernd Schuster (born 1959), German football manager

== See also ==
- Roman Šuster (born 1978), Czech rugby union player
