= Martin Kafka (rugby union) =

Czech rugby union player (born 1978)

- Born: July 25, 1978 (age 48) Říčany, Czechoslovakia
- Height: 1.80 m (5 ft 11 in)
- Weight: 85 kg (13 st 5 lb)
- University: Charles University in Prague
- Notable relative: Franz Kafka (great-uncle)

Rugby union career
- Position(s): Fly-half, centre
Amateur team(s)
Years	Team	Apps	(Points)
1985-1998	Říčany		
1999-2001	Valencia		
2001-2003	La Moraleja Alcobendas		
Senior career
Years	Team	Apps	(Points)
2003-2004	Castres		
2004-2005	Racing Métro		
2005–2006	Sanix		
International career
Years	Team	Apps	(Points)
2000?-2006	Czech Republic	37	(136)
Coaching career
- Years: Team
- 2007-: Czech Republic

Martin Kafka (born 25 July 1978 in Říčany) is a former Czech rugby player and the current coach of the Czech Republic. His great-grandfather was a cousin of the famous writer Franz Kafka and his grandfather Erich Kafka was a footballer playing for DFC Prague.

== Early years ==
Kafka started playing rugby at the age of seven at his hometown club. In 1997 he went to study at the Faculty of Physical Education and Sport at the Charles University in Prague, with the intention of becoming a Physical Education teacher.

== Rugby career ==
He went to Spain in 1999, playing for Valencia, who were then in the Spanish Second Division (División de Honor B).

In 2001 he joined La Moraleja Alcobendas, which boasted international players such as the Souto brothers, Carlos and Sergio. His two seasons at the club was a particularly successful part of his career, with him leading the club to victory against Overmach Parma in the European Challenge Cup in 2002 and finishing up as top scorer in the Spanish First Division (División de Honor) in both 2002 and 2003. In 2003 he played for Castres in France, and Racing Métro the following year before rounding out his playing career at Japanese Top League side Sanix.

=== International ===
He won at least 37 caps for the Czech Republic from 2000 to 2006, scoring at least 136 points in the process before assuming the coach's mantle in 2007.

== Honours ==
- Czech Rugby Player of the Year:
  - 2002
