= Sparta Praha (disambiguation) =

AC Sparta Prague is most notably a Czech football club based in Prague (Athletic Club Sparta Praha).

Sparta Prague or Sparta Praha may also refer to:

- AC Sparta Prague B, the men's junior football team
- AC Sparta Praha (women), a women's football team
- AC Sparta Praha (cycling team)
- BC Sparta Prague, a men's basketball team
- BLC Sparta Prague, a women's basketball team
- HC Sparta Prague, an ice hockey team
- RC Sparta Prague, a rugby union team
- TK Sparta Prague, a tennis club and training center

== See also ==
- WTA Prague Open, a tennis tournament formerly known as the Sparta Prague open
