= Jan Macháček =

Czech rugby union player (born 1972)

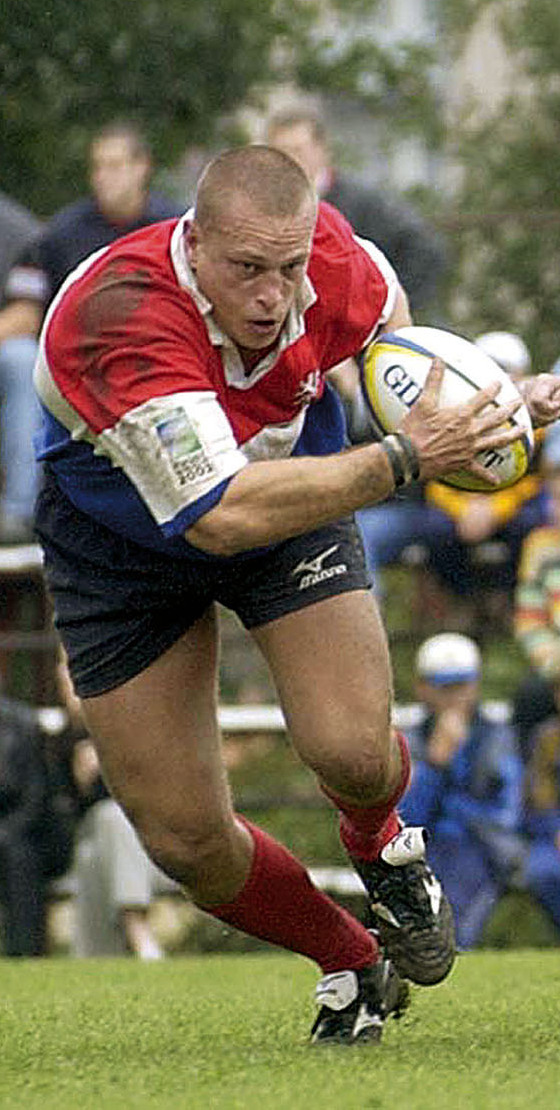
- Born: 15 February 1972 (age 54) Prague, Czechoslovakia
- Height: 1.93 m (6 ft 4 in)
- Weight: 110 kg (17 st 5 lb)
- University: Charles University in Prague
- Occupation: Entrepreneur

Rugby union career
- Position(s): Flanker, number eight, lock
Amateur team(s)
Years	Team	Apps	(Points)
1990–1994	Slavia Prague		
1995	Dunedin Pirates		
2003–2004	Říčany		
2004–2014	Slavia Prague		
2015–2017	RA Olymp Praha		
Senior career
Years	Team	Apps	(Points)
1996–1998	Newport	61	(155)
1998–1999	Sale Sharks	11	(20)
1999–2000	Pontypridd	19	(25)
2000–2003	Clermont	30	(15)
International career
Years	Team	Apps	(Points)
1993–2009	Czech Republic	55	

Jan Macháček (born 15 February 1972 in Prague) is a former Czech rugby player. He is one of arguably the two most famous Czech rugby players, along with Martin Jágr. He played for Newport RFC and Pontypridd RFC in Wales, Sale Sharks in England, Clermont Auvergne in France as well as the Barbarians.

He is currently CEO and owner of Infonia s.r.o., a webdesign company.

== Early life ==
He was born in Prague and started playing rugby on account of his father Dušan having played. The first team he played for was the Czech Slavia Prague.

== International career ==
He played his final match on 16 December 2009 in a 17–5 win against Hong Kong in Prague, aged 37 years.
