= Rugby Championship of Czechoslovakia =

Rugby club competition

The Rugby Championship of Czechoslovakia was a rugby club competition in Czechoslovakia. It was played from 1929 to 1992, after which it was succeeded by the KB Extraliga and the KB První Liga. The champion is the team that is at the top of the league.

== Results ==
Year	Champion
1929	Slavia Prague
1930	Slavia Prague
1931	Sparta Prague
1932	Slavia Prague
1933	Slavia Prague
1934	Slavia Prague
1935-1947	Not held
1948	Sokol LTC Praha
1949	ATK Praha
1950	Sokol Brno I
1951	ATK Praha
1952	ATK Praha
1953	UDA Praha
1954	UDA Praha
1955	AZKG Praha
1956	Dynamo Praha
1957	Dynamo Praha
1958	Dynamo Praha
1959	Dynamo Praha
1960	AZKG Praha
1961	Dynamo Praha
1962	AZKG Praha
1963	AZKG Praha
1964	Slavia Prague
1965	Spartak ZJS
1966	AZKG Praha

Year	Champion
1967	Sparta Prague
1968	Sparta Prague
1969	Slavia Prague
1970	Dukla Přelouč
1971	Slavia Prague
1972	TJ Praga
1973	Sparta Prague
1974	TJ Vyškov
1975	TJ Vyškov
1976	TJ Vyškov
1977	TJ Vyškov
1978	TJ Vyškov
1979	TJ Vyškov
1980	TJ Vyškov
1981	TJ Vyškov
1982	TJ Praga
1983	TJ Praga
1984	TJ Praga
1985	TJ Vyškov
1986	TJ Praga
1987	TJ Praga
1988	TJ Praga
1989	TJ Vyškov
1990	Sparta Prague
1991	TJ Vyškov
1992	TJ Praga
