= Czech Rugby Player of the Year =

The Czech Rugby Player of the Year (Ragbista roku) is awarded to the player voted the best in the Czech Republic.

The awards have grown since 2001. They are presented at an evening ceremony.

- 2001: Coach of the Year and U20 Talent of the Year
- 2002: Referee of the Year
- 2005: Rugby Event of the Year
- 2008: Woman Player of the Year and Woman U20 Talent of the Year
- 2009: Personality of Domestic Competition
- 2010: Sevens Player of the Year
- 2013: National Player of the Year and Miss Rugby
- 2014: U18 Talent of the Year
- 2015: U16 Talent of the Year

== History ==
It was first awarded in 1972 with Jiří Skall senior, father of former international prop Jiří Skall, as the inaugural winner.

== Winners ==
Year	Winner	Club	2nd place	Club	3rd place	Club
1972	Jiří Skall senior	Rugby Club Sparta Praha				
1973	Jaromír Kourek	Rugby Club Sparta Praha				
1974	Bruno Kudrna	Rugby Club Praga Praha				
1975	Karel Berka	Rugby Club Vyškov				
1976	Karel Berka	Rugby Club Vyškov				
1977	Bruno Kudrna	Rugby Club Praga Praha				
1978	Vlastimil Jágr	Rugby Club Tatra Smíchov				
1979	Bruno Kudrna	Rugby Club Praga Praha				
1980	Vlastimil Jágr	Rugby Club Tatra Smíchov				
1981	Bruno Kudrna	Rugby Club Praga Praha				
1982	Bruno Kudrna	Rugby Club Praga Praha				
1983	Václav Fanta	Rugby Club Tatra Smíchov				
1984	Zdeněk Mrazčínský	Rugby Club Vyškov				
1985	Miroslav Fuchs	Rugby Club Praga Praha				
1986	Bruno Kudrna	Rugby Club Praga Praha				
1987	Miroslav Fuchs	Rugby Club Praga Praha				
1988	Petr Skopal	Rugby Club Zbrojovka Brno				
1989	Miroslav Fuchs	Rugby Club Praga Praha				
1990	Jiří Koutný	Rugby Club Vyškov				
1991	Luděk Kudláček	Rugby Club Praga Praha				
1992	Pavel Bureš	Rugby Club Říčany				
1993	Petr Michovský	Rugby Club Říčany				
1994	Jan Macháček	Rugby Club Slavia Praha				
1995	Antonín Brabec	Rugby Club Tatra Smíchov				
1996	Jan Macháček	Newport RFC	Milan Mrtýnek	Rugby Club Praga Praha	Antonín Brabec	Rugby Club Tatra Smíchov
1997	Ladislav Vondrášek	Rugby Club Slavia Praha	Roman Rygl	Rugby Club Tatra Smíchov	Milan Mrtýnek	Rugby Club Praga Praha
1998	Jan Macháček	Sale Sharks	Jiří Skall	Rugby Club Sparta Praha	Ladislav Vondrášek	Rugby Club Slavia Praha
1999	Jan Fojtík	Rugby Club Slavia Praha	Jan Macháček	Rugby Club Slavia Praha	Roman Rygl	Rugby Club Tatra Smíchov
2000	Jan Macháček	ASM Clermont Ferrand	Martin Kafka	--	Martin Jágr	--
2001	Jan Macháček	ASM Clermont Ferrand	Martin Kafka	--	Martin Jágr	--
2002	Martin Kafka	La Moraleja Alcobendas	Martin Jágr	Rugby Club Toulonnais	Jan Macháček	ASM Clermont Ferrand
2003	Jan Žíla	Rugby Club Tatra Smíchov	Martin Kafka	Castres Olympiques	Roman Rygl	Rugby Club Tatra Smíchov
2004	Martin Jágr	Rugby Club Toulonnais	Ladislav Vondráček	RFC Bracknell	Martin Kafka	Métro Racing Paris
2005	Martin Jágr	Rugby Club Toulonnais				
2006	Karel Kučera	Rugby Club Říčany	Martin Jágr	Rugby Club Toulonnais	Ladislav Vondráček	RFC Esher
2007	Martin Jágr	Rugby Club Toulonnais	Pavel Syrový	Rugby Club Praga Praha	Jan Oswald	Rugby Club Tatra Smíchov
2008	Martin Jágr	Rugby Club Toulonnais	Pavel Syrový	Rugby Club Praga Praha	Lukáš Rapant	US Oyonnax Rugby
2009	Martin Jágr	Union Bourdeaux-Bégles	Roman Šuster	Rugby Club Aurillac	Lukáš Rapant	US Oyonnax Rugby
2010	Roman Šuster	Rugby Club Aurillac	Robert Voves	Racing Club Narbonne Mediterranée	Pavel Vokrouhlík	Rugby Club Sparta Praha
2011	Roman Šuster	Rugby Club Aurillac	Miroslav Němeček	US Oyonnax Rugby	Ondřej Kutil	SOC Rugby Chambery
2012	Petr Čížek	Rugby Club Praga Praha	Martin Jágr	Stade Montois	Ondřej Kutil	SOC Rugby Chambery
2013	Miroslav Němeček	US Oyonnax Rugby	Lukáš Rapant	US Oyonnax Rugby	Vojtěch Mára	Rugby Club Tatra Smíchov
2014	Miroslav Němeček	US Oyonnax Rugby	Robert Voves	Rugby Club Praga Praha	Pavel Syrový	Rugby Club Praga Praha
2015	Lukáš Rapant	US Oyonnax Rugby	Miroslav Němeček	RC Hyeres Carqueiranne La Crau	Jan Rohlík	Rugby Club Mountfield Říčany
2016	Lukáš Rapant	US Oyonnax Rugby	Vojtěch Hruška	RC Auxerrois	Vojtěch Havel	RC Tatra Smíchov

== Trivia ==
- Vlastimil and Martin Jágr are a father-and-son combination who have both won the award. Vlastimil Jágr won in 1978 and 1980. Martin Jágr won five times in 2004, 2005, 2007, 2008, and 2009.
- Bruno Kudrna won six times. his son Jan Kudrna won U20 Talent in 2003.
- Jan Macháček won in two categories. He won the Player of the Year five times in 1994, 1996, 1998, 2000, and 2001 and one time the Personality of the Domestic Competition in 2010.
- Antonín Brabec won in three categories. He won the Player of the Year in 1995 and the Coach of the Year in 2010 and 2011. He won as organizer of the Rugby Event of the Year in 2010 with the legendary international tournament Prague Beach 5s.
- Martin Kafka won in two categories. He won the Player of the Year in 2002 and the Coach of the Year in 2008 and 2009.

== Other categories ==
=== Sevens Player of the Year ===
Year	Winner	Club	2nd place	Club	3rd place	Club
2010	Michal Schlanger	Rugby Club Mountfield Říčany	--	--	--	--
2011	Pavel Syrový	Rugby Club Praga Praha	--	--	--	--
2012	Vachtang Pailodze	Rugby Club Sparta Praha	Aleš Stejskal	Scarborough RUFC	Tomáš Forst	Rugby Club Praga Praha
2013	Vachtang Pailodze	Rugby Club Sparta Praha	--	--	--	--
2014	Tomáš Forst	Rugby Club Praga Praha	--	--	--	--
2015	Tomáš Forst	RC Praga Praha	Vojtěch Havel	Sporting Nazairen Rugby	Vachtang Pailodze	Rugby Club Sparta Praha
2016	Tomáš Forst	RC Praga Praha	Vojtěch Havel	RC Tatra Smíchov	Čížek Jan	RC Přelouč

=== Woman Player of the Year ===
Year	Winner	Club	Talent of the Year U20	Club
2008	Klára Hladilová	Rugby Club Sparta Praha	Pavlína Čuprová	JIMI Rugby Club Vyškov
2009	Hana Schlangerová	Rugby Club Sparta Praha	Ester Charvátová/Karolína Valentová	Rugby Club Sparta Praha/Ragby Klub Petrovice
2010	Hana Schlangerová	Rugby Club Sparta Praha	Barbora Bendová	Ragby Klub Petrovice
2011	Kateřina Kulová	Rugby Club Slavia Praha	Nela Veselá	TJ Sokol Mariánské Hory
2012	Pavlína Čuprová	JIMI Rugby Club Vyškov	Kateřina Vrbacká	JIMI Rugby Club Vyškov
2013	Pavlína Čuprová	JIMI Rugby Club Vyškov	Alexandra Zítková/Dominika Dohnalová	Rugby Club Dragon Brno/RC Havířov
2014	Věra Samková	Rugby Club Sparta Praha	Kateřina Nováková	Rugby Club Plzeň
2015	Pavlína Čuprová	JIMI Rugby Club Vyškov	Anežka Sládková	RK Petrovice
2016	Pavlína Čuprová	JIMI RC Vyškov	Anežka Sládková	RK Petrovice

=== Talent of the Year ===
Year	Talent of the Year U20	Club	Talent of the Year U18	Club	Talent of the Year U16	Club
2001	Jan Rohlík	Rugby Club Říčany	--	--	--	--
2002	Lukáš Rapant	Rugby Club Havířov	--	--	--	--
2003	Jan Kudrna	Rugby Club Praga Praha	--	--	--	--
2004	Michal Schlanger	Ragby Klub Petrovice	--	--	--	--
2005	Jan Rudolf	Ragby Klub Petrovice	--	--	--	--
2006	Ondřej Kutil	JIMI Rugby Club Vyškov	--	--	--	--
2007	Milan Jirman	Rugby Club Slavia Praha	--	--	--	--
2008	Tomáš Forst	Rugby Club Praga Praha	--	--	--	--
2009	Michal Vančura	Rugby Club Mountfield Říčany	--	--	--	--
2010	Vojtěch Havel	Rugby Club Tatra Smíchov	--	--	--	--
2011	Aleš Stejskal	Rugby Club Dragon Brno	--	--	--	--
2012	Vojtěch Hruška	Rugby Club Sparta Praha	--	--	--	--
2013	Jan Kohout	Rugby Club Přelouč	--	--	--	--
2014	Jan Školař	JIMI Rugby Club Vyškov	Hubert Dřímal	Rugby Club Sparta Praha	Martin Cimprich	Rugby Club Mountfield Říčany
2015	Jiří Pantůček	JIMI Rugby Club Vyškov	Martin Cimprich	Rugby Club Mountfield Říčany	Daniel Rygl	Rugby Club Tatra Smíchov
2016	Hubert Dřímal	SOC Chambery	Martin Cimprich	Rugby Club Mountfield Říčany	Adam Putna	Rugby Club Bystrc

=== Coach of the Year ===
Year	Winner	Club	Women coach	Club	Youth coach	Club
2001	Jiří Šťastný	Rugby Club Dragon Brno	--	--	--	--
2002	Josef Fatka	Rugby Club Tatra Smíchov	--	--	--	--
2003	Josef Fatka	Rugby Club Tatra Smíchov	--	--	--	--
2004	Radomír Kloda	Rugby Club Havířov	--	--	--	--
2005	Josef Fatka	Rugby Club Tatra Smíchov	--	--	--	--
2006	Marek Valeš	Rugby Club Říčany	--	--	--	--
2007	Suvad Kapetonovič	Rugby Club Tatra Smíchov	--	--	--	--
2008	Martin Kafka	National team XV	--	--	--	--
2009	Martin Kafka	National team XV	--	--	--	--
2010	Antonín Brabec	Rugby Club Mountfield Říčany	--	--	--	--
2011	Antonín Brabec	Rugby Club Mountfield Říčany	--	--	--	--
2012	Jan Oswald	Rugby Club Tatra Smíchov	--	--	--	--
2013	Jan Oswald	Rugby Club Tatra Smíchov	--	--	--	--
2014	Eduard Krützner Jr.	Rugby Club Praga Praha	Zdeněk Albrecht	Rugby Club Sparta Praha	--	--
2015	Eduard Krützner Jr.	Rugby Club Praga Praha	Zdeněk Albrecht	Rugby Club Sparta Praha	Tomáš Kohout	Rugby Club Mountfield Říčany
2016	Pavel Pala	JIMI RC Vyškov	Stanislav Král	RC Tatra Smíchov	Tomáš Kohout	Rugby Club Mountfield Říčany

=== Referee of the Year ===
Year	Winner	Club	2nd place	Club	3rd place	Club
2002	Jiří Štuksa	Rugby Club Říčany	Tomáš Tůma	Rugby Club Říčany	Miroslav Šustek	Rugby Club Vyškov
2003	Jiří Štuksa	Rugby Club Říčany	Tomáš Tůma	Rugby Club Říčany	Jaroslav Bednařík	RC Dragon Brno
2004	Jiří Štuksa	Rugby Club Říčany	Tomáš Tůma	Rugby Club Říčany	Jaroslav Bednařík	RC Dragon Brno
2005	Jiří Štuksa	Rugby Club Říčany	--	--	--	--
2006	Tomáš Tůma	Rugby Club Říčany	--	--	--	--
2007	Tomáš Tůma	Rugby Club Říčany	--	--	--	--
2008	Tomáš Tůma	Rugby Club Mountfield Říčany	--	--	--	--
2009	Tomáš Tůma	Rugby Club Mountfield Říčany	--	--	--	--
2010	Tomáš Tůma	Rugby Club Mountfield Říčany	Jiří Štuksa	Rugby Club Mountfield Říčany	Jaroslav Bednařík	Rugby Club Dragon Brno
2011	Tomáš Tůma	Rugby Club Mountfield Říčany	--	--	--	--
2012	Tomáš Tůma	Rugby Club Mountfield Říčany	Jaroslav Bednařík	Rugby Club Dragon Brno	Štěpán Čekal	Rugby Club Praga Praha
2013	Matěj Rázga	Rugby Club Slavia Praha	Tomáš Tůma	Rugby Club Mountfield Říčany	--	--
2014	Matěj Rázga	Rugby Club Slavia Praha	Tomáš Tůma	Rugby Club Mountfield Říčany	Jaroslav Bednařík	Rugby Club Dragon Brno
2015	Matěj Rázga	Rugby Club Slavia Praha	Jaroslav Bednařík	Rugby Club Dragon Brno	Tomáš Tůma	Rugby Club Mountfield Říčany
2016	Matěj Rázga	Rugby Club Slavia Praha	Jaroslav Bednařík	Rugby Club Dragon Brno	Tomáš Tůma	Rugby Club Mountfield Říčany
2017	Jaroslav Bednařík	Rugby Club Dragon Brno	Matěj Rázga	Rugby Club Slavia Praha	Hana Erika Radochová	Rugby Club Petrovice

=== National Team Player of the Year ===
Year	Winner	Club	2nd place	Club	3rd place	Club
2013	Robert Voves	Rugby Club Praga Praha	--	--	--	--
2014	Robert Voves	Rugby Club Praga Praha	Roman Šuster	Stade Rouennais	Marek Loutocký	Rugby Club Sparta Praha
2015	Robert Voves	Rugby Club Praga Praha	Lukáš Rapant	US Oyonnax Rugby	Klára Hladilová	Rugby Club Sparta Praha
2015	Lukáš Rapant	US Oyonnax Rugby	Vojtěch Havel	RC Tatra Smíchov	Jan Rohlík	RC Mountfield Říčany

=== Personality of Domestic Competition ===
Year	Winner	Club	2nd place	Club	3rd place	Club
2009	Pavel Syrový	Rugby Club Praga Praha	--	--	--	--
2010	Jan Macháček	Rugby Club Slavia Praha	Pavel Syrový	Rugby Club Praga Praha	Roman Rygl	Rugby Club Tatra Smíchov
2011	Pavel Syrový	Rugby Club Praga Praha	--	--	--	--
2012	Pavel Syrový	Rugby Club Praga Praha	Robert Voves	Rugby Club Praga Praha	Roman Rygl	Rugby Club Tatra Smíchov
2013	Pavel Syrový	Rugby Club Praga Praha	Jan Macháček	Rugby Club Slavia Praha	Jan Rohlík	Rugby Club Mountfield Říčany
2014	Pavel Syrový	Rugby Club Praga Praha	Robert Voves	Rugby Club Praga Praha	Jiří Skall	Rugby Club Sparta Praha
2015	Pavel Syrový	Rugby Club Praga Praha	Roman Rygl	Rugby Club Tatra Smíchov	Jiří Skall	Rugby Club Sparta Praha
2016	Jiří Skall	RC Sparta Praha	Jan Rohlík	RC Mountfield Říčany	Roman Rygl	RC Tatra Smíchov
2017	Pavel Šťastný	RC Praga Praha	--	--	--	--
2018	Roman Rygl	RC Tatra Smíchov	--	--	--	--
2019	Antonín Brabec	RC Mountfield Říčany	Pavel Vokrouhlík	RC Sparta Praha	Karel Školař	JIMI RC Vyškov

=== Event of the Year ===
Year	Winner	Club/person	2nd place	Club/person	3rd place	Club/person
2005	Match ČR vs Waratahs	Czech Rugby Union	--	--	--	--
2006	Rugby broadcast on Czech TV	Česká televize	--	--	--	--
2007	European Championship U20	Czech Rugby Union	--	--	--	--
2008	Match Extraliga finale	Czech Rugby Union	--	--	--	--
2009	Match ČR vs Hong Kong	Czech Rugby Union	--	--	--	--
2010	Tournament Prague Beach 5s	Antonín Brabec & Jiří Skall	Match Extraliga finale	Czech Rugby Union	Kids day	Rugby Club Mountfield
2011	Tournament Old Prague Ham	Rugby Club Old Boys Prague	Match Extraliga finale	ČSRU	Tournament Prague 7s	Antonín Brabec & Michal Schlanger
2012	Tournament European Championship U20	Czech Rugby Union	--	--	--	--
2013	Tournament Old Prague Ham	Rugby Club Old Boys Prague	--	Rugby Club	--	Rugby Club
2014	European Championship U20	ČSRU & Dragon Brno, Bytrc, JIMI RC Vyškov	Tournament Prague Beach Rugby 5s	Antonín Brabec & Jiří Skall	Tournament European 7s	Czech Rugby Union
2015	Match ČR vs NZ Ambassador´s XV	ČSRU & Rugby Club Tatra Smíchov	European Championship U20	ČSRU & RC Dragon Brno & JIMI RC Vyškov	Tournament Prague Beach Rugby 5s	Antonín Brabec & Jiří Skall
2016	Match ČR vs Barbarian F.C.	ČSRU	Match ČR vs NZ Ambassador´s XV	ČSRU & Rugby Club Tatra Smíchov	-	-

=== Miss Rugby ===
Year	Winner	Club	2nd place	Club	3rd place	Club
2013	Martina Douděrová	Rugby Club Přelouč	Dominika Dohnalová	Rugby Club Havířov	Květa Kottková	Rugby Club Slavia Praha
2014	Jana Jarošová	Rugby Club Přelouč	Zuzana Malá	Ragby Klub Petrovice	Denisa Adamusová	Rugby Club Havířov
2015	Jana Gottwaldová	JIMI Rugby Club Vyškov	Anna Fráňová	Rugby Club Dragon Brno	Lucie Vavříková	Rugby Club Olomouc
