= RC Písek =

Czech rugby union club, based in Pisek

- Full name: Rugby Club Písek
- Nickname: Vepřová kolena (Pork knee)
- Founded: 2008; 18 years ago
- Location: Písek, Czech Republic
- President: (Czech Republic) Libor Machálek
- Coach: (Czech Republic) Zdeněk Albrecht
- Captain: (Czech Republic) Petr Mikšátko
Team kit

RC Písek is a Czech rugby union club based in Písek. They currently do not play in a league.

== History ==
The club was founded in 2008 by three employees of Schneider Electric in the town, Emmanuel Boyer, Bastien Loiseaux and Lenka Hauptmanova.

In 2008 the club participated in its first tournament, sponsored by Schneider Electric in Metz, France.
