= Martin Jágr =

Czech rugby union player (born 1979)

- Born: September 29, 1979 (age 47) Prague, Czechoslovakia
- Height: 1.81 m (5 ft 11 in)
- Weight: 85 kg (13 st 5 lb)
- Occupation: Professional rugby union player

Rugby union career
- Position: Wing
Amateur team(s)
Years	Team	Apps	(Points)
1997-2000	RC Sparta Prague		
Senior career
Years	Team	Apps	(Points)
2000-2001	Pontypool RFC		
2001-2009	RC Toulonnais		
2009-2011	Union Bordeaux Bègles		
2011-	Stade Montois		
International career
Years	Team	Apps	(Points)
1998-2006	Czech Republic	8	(5)

Martin Jágr (born 29 September 1979 in Prague) is a Czech rugby union footballer. He is nicknamed "Jaguar". His position on the field is on the wing. Jágr is usually considered one of the best rugby union players from his country.

He was first noticed at Sparta Prague, in the Czech Republic, where he played from 1997/1998 to 1999/2000, winning two titles of National Champion, within the first two seasons. Jágr was then assigned for the Welsh team of Pontypool RFC, staying an entire season. The Czech wing then moved to Toulon, at that time in the French Rugby Pro D2, where he played through the 2008–09 season. He played for Toulon teams that won the Pro D2 crown in 2005 and 2008. After a 2008–2009 season that saw Toulon flirt with relegation before a late-season surge brought them to safety, he was one of many players released from the team. Jágr then signed with Pro D2 side Bordeaux-Bègles.

He had 8 caps for Czech Republic, scoring 1 try, 5 points in aggregate.
