= Rugby union in the Czech Republic =

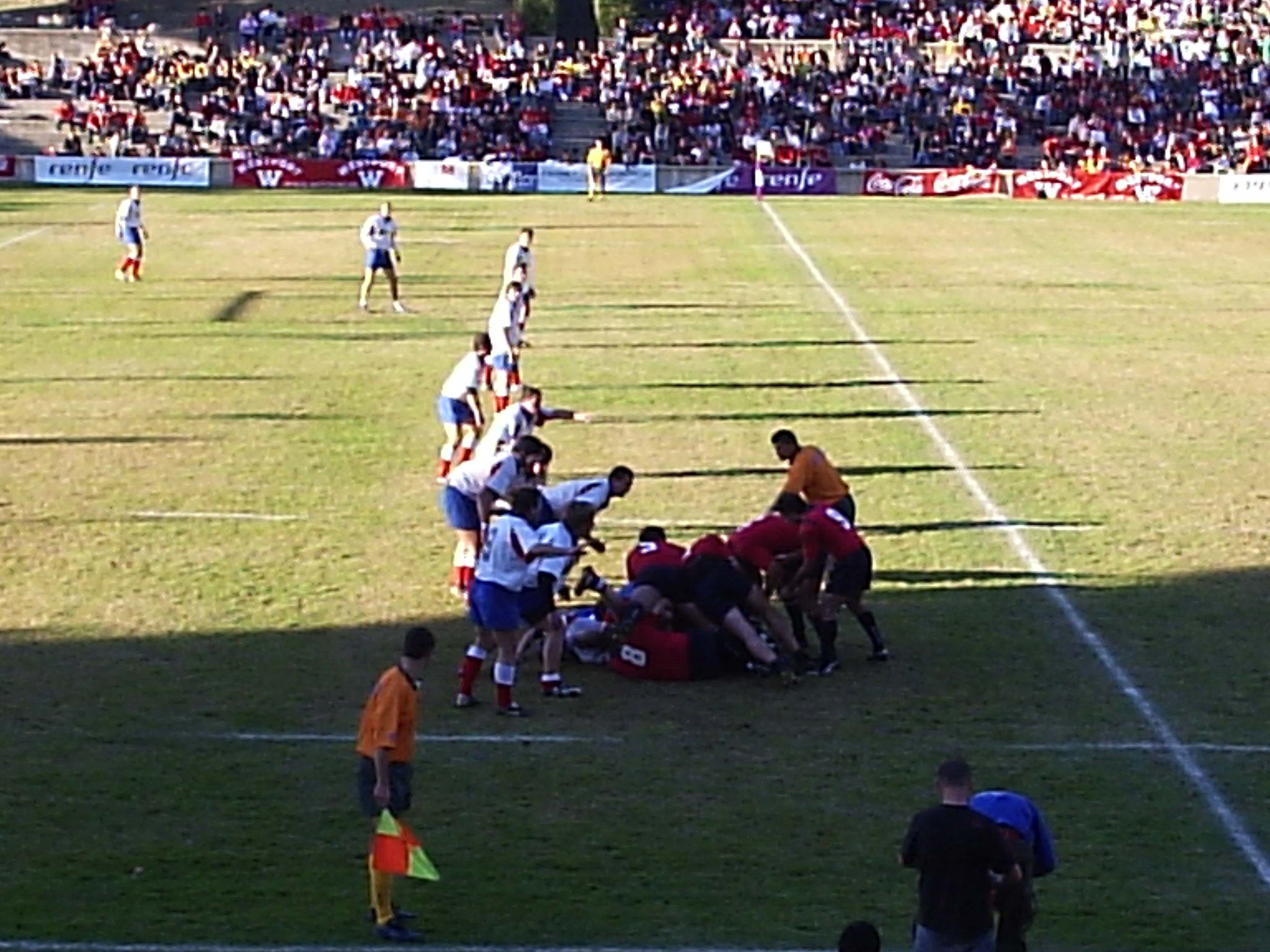
- The Czechs playing Spain
- Country: Czech Republic
- Governing body: Česká Rugbyová Unie
- National team: Czech Republic
- First played: 1926, Brno
- Registered players: 5,172
- Clubs: 21

National competitions
- Rugby World Cup; Rugby World Cup Sevens; IRB Sevens World Series; European Nations Cup

Rugby union in the Czech Republic is a growing sport. As of 1 November 2010, they are currently ranked thirty-first in the International Rugby Board's world rankings.

Traditionally, Czech rugby has centred on a "section of the middle class" in and around Prague, which has been fairly small but fairly loyal to the sport.

The Czech Republic has also been popular with touring sides, because of its relatively low beer prices, and historic surroundings.

== Governing body ==
Czechoslovakia was a founder member of FIRA in 1934, and joined the IRB in 1988.

Rugby union in the Czech Republic is governed by a national body called the Česká Rugbyová Unie (ČSRU). The president of the ČSRU is Pavel Telička.

== History ==
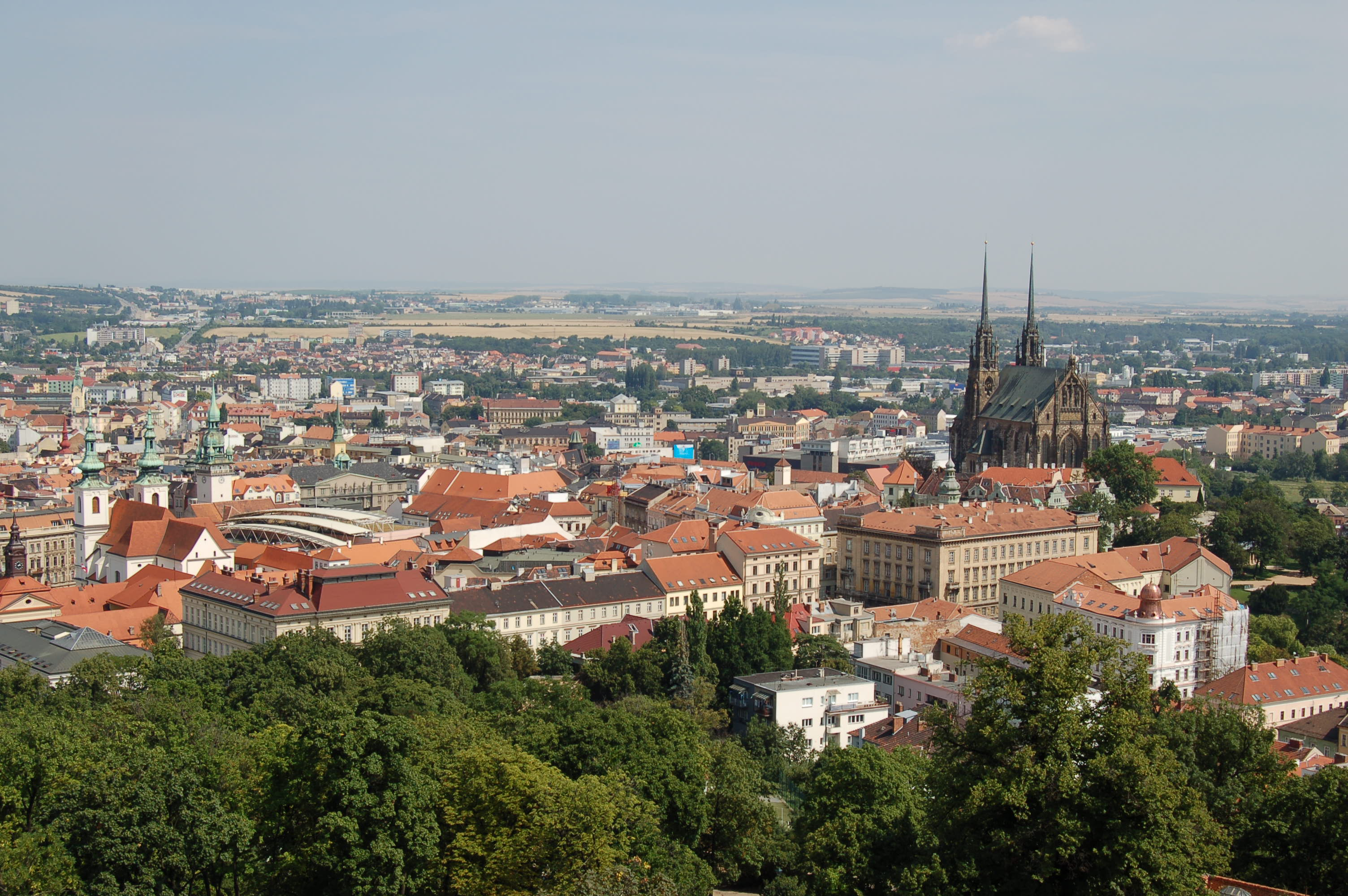
Brno, the cradle of Czech rugby

Josef Rössler-Ořovský, who introduced a number of sports in the then Czechoslovakia, among others skiing and tennis, was originally credited with starting rugby as well back in 1895. He went to England and brought back a rugby ball with him. Efforts were made to play the game at the Czech Yacht Club, but a public struggle ensued, and rugby subsequently never really caught on.

Rugby union was only properly introduced to the country by the writer Ondřej Sekora, when he returned from living in France in 1926, with a rugby ball and set of rules. Brno, the Moravian capital is considered the cradle of rugby in Czechoslovakia, and is where the first match took place, between SK Moravská Slávie, based in Brno-Pisárky, and AFK Zizka, based in Brno. Both of these teams were trained by Sekora, who also coined Czech language rugby terminology.

Czech rugby took off after 1945, when Zdenek Bárchenék, Eduard Krützner and Bruno Kudrna, helped in games against rivals Poland and Germany

Rugby union in the Czech Republic has not been popular historically, but due to its recent international successes, it is gaining more recognition. As of April 2009, more than half of the registered players are pre-teens or teenagers. In addition, there are currently twenty-one domestic clubs that compete against each other on various levels.

== National team ==
The national team has been competing since the early 1990s. As of April 2009, the national team is currently competing in the European Nations Cup and is attempting to qualify for the 2011 Rugby World Cup.

== See also ==
- Czech Republic national rugby union team
- Česká Rugbyová Unie
- Czech Republic women's national rugby union team
- KB Extraliga
- KB První Liga
