= Roman Šuster =

Czech Republic international rugby union player

- Born: January 8, 1978 (age 48)
- Height: 1.87 m (6 ft 2 in)
- Weight: 119 kg (18 st 10 lb)

Rugby union career
- Position: Prop
Senior career
Years	Team	Apps	(Points)
2004 - 2005	Nazairien Rugby		
2005 - 2007	USA Limoges		
2007 - 2008	Villeurbanne		
2008 - 2009	Stade Rouennais		
2009 - 2010	Auch		
2010 - Present	Aurillac		
International career
Years	Team	Apps	(Points)
2003 -	Czech Republic	16	(10)

Roman Šuster (born 8 January 1978) is a Czech rugby union player. He plays as a prop.

He moved to France, where he has been playing for Sporting Nazairien Rugby (2004/05), USA Limoges (2005/06-2006/07), Villeurbanne (2007/08), Stade Rouennais Rugby (2008/09), FC Auch Gers (2009/10), Stade Aurillacois Cantal Auvergne, since 2010/11.

Šuster has currently 16 caps for the Czech Republic national team, since 2003, with 2 tries scored, 10 points in aggregate.
