= RC Vyškov =

Czech rugby union club, based in Vyškov

- Full name: Rugby Club Vyškov
- Founded: 1952; 74 years ago
- Location: Vyškov, Czech Republic
- Ground: Areál Jana Navrátila
- President: (Czech Republic) Jiří Klement
- Coach(es): (Czech Republic) Milan Wognitsch (Czech Republic) Dušan Lodes
- Captain: (Czech Republic) Martin Hudák
- League: Extraliga ragby XV
Team kit

RC Vyškov (known as JIMI RC Vyškov for sponsorship reasons) is a Czech rugby union club in Vyškov. They currently play in the Extraliga ragby XV.

== History ==
The club was founded in 1952.

They undertook their first overseas tour to France in 1967.

The club won their first championship in 1974, beating Říčany 15-0 in the final. This turned out to be the start of a successful era for the club, which saw them winning the next seven championship titles. The success of the senior team filtered through to the youth teams in those years.

In 1995 the club experienced tragedy when they lost one of their own. Jan Navrátil, former international prop and their coach at the time, rescued two men rendered unconscious from a resulting gas leak, while trying to repair some freezing equipment in the cellar of the clubhouse. Navrátil subsequently died from gas poisoning and was posthumously awarded a Fair Play Award by the Czech Olympic Committee. The club also named their home ground in his memory.

== Honours ==
- Czechoslovak Championships
  - 1974, 1975, 1976, 1977, 1978, 1979, 1980, 1981, 1985, 1989, 1991
- Extraliga ragby XV
  - 1993, 1994, 2016
