= Fortuna Arena =

Football stadium in Prague, Czech Republic

- Eden
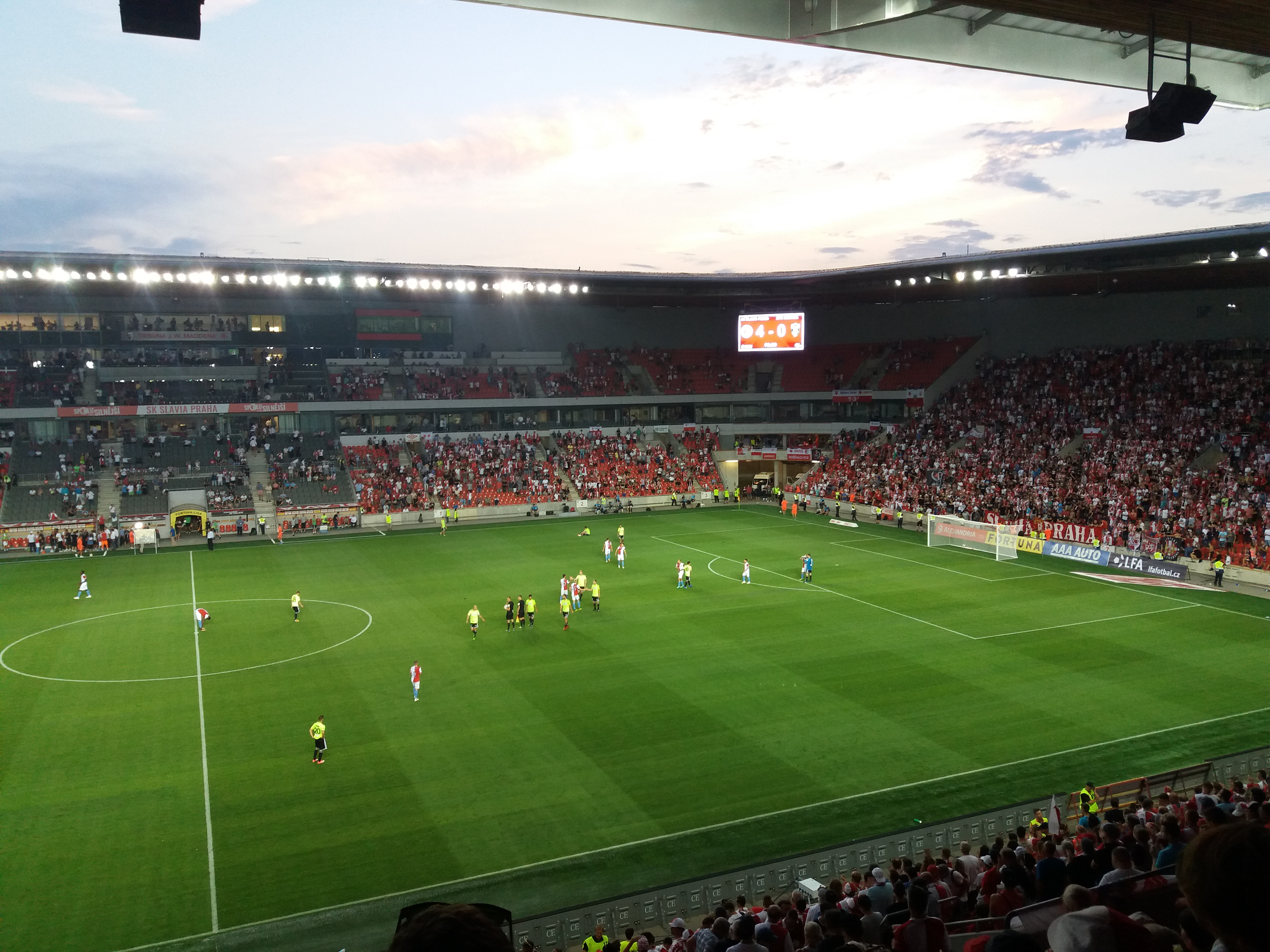
- UEFA
- Interactive map of Fortuna Arena
- Former names: Stadion Eden (2008); Synot Tip Arena (2009–2012); Eden Arena (2012–2018); Sinobo Stadium (2018–2022)
- Location: U Slavie 1540/2a, Vršovice, Prague, Czech Republic, 100 00
- Coordinates: 50°04′03″N 14°28′18″E
- Owner: Eden Arena
- Operator: Slavia Prague
- Capacity: 19,370
- Field size: 105 metres (115 yd) x 68 metres (74 yd)

Construction
- Groundbreaking: 15 September 2006
- Opened: 7 May 2008
- Cost: 1 billion CZK
- Architects: Martin Kotík; Daniel Dvořák; Leoš Zeman

Tenants
- Slavia Prague (2008–present); Bohemians 1905 (2010–2012); Czech Republic national football team (selected matches)

Fortuna Arena is a football stadium, in Prague-Vršovice, Czech Republic. The stadium has a capacity of 19,370 people and it is the biggest and the most modern football stadium in the Czech Republic.

It is the home venue of Slavia Prague and occasionally the Czech Republic national football team. In the 2010–11 and 2011–12 seasons, it was also the venue of Bohemians 1905 home matches. During the 2011–12 season the stadium hosted home matches for Viktoria Plzeň in the Champions League group stage. The stadium hosted the 2013 UEFA Super Cup.

== History ==
In the early 1950s, Slavia was forced to leave its stadium at Letná and a new stadium was built at Eden in the Vršovice district. Its capacity was about 50,000 (mostly for standing). The wooden western (main) stand was taken from the old stadium at Letná, the rest of the stands were made of concrete. The stadium also featured an athletics track. The first match at this stadium took place on 27 September 1953, Slavia drew 1–1 against the team of Křídla vlasti Olomouc. Josef Bican scored the home team's goal.

=== Move ===
In the 1970s, it became apparent that Eden did not provide sufficient comfort for the visitors and planning started to build a new one in the same place. However, under the communist regime, the planning went quite slowly. Several projects were made, and the construction was finally to start in 1990. In 1989, Slavia moved temporarily to the nearby Ďolíček stadium (home of FC Bohemians Prague, now known as Bohemians 1905) and the eastern stand was torn down. However, the overthrowing of the communist regime in 1989 delayed the construction. In the meantime, Slavia moved to Stadion Evžena Rošického, a stadium on the Strahov hill, which is large but uncomfortable and poorly accessible.

In the early 1990s, the whole construction was cancelled and Slavia moved back to Eden. A temporary stand was built in the place of former eastern stand, but it was clear that Eden was outdated and Slavia needed a new home ground. Several more projects were proposed, but Slavia was unable to raise sufficient funds and there were some legal problems, as the premises were owned by the government and it took a lot of effort to transfer them to Slavia. In 2000, the stadium became ineligible to host Czech First League matches, so Slavia moved to the unpopular Strahov again.

=== New stadium ===
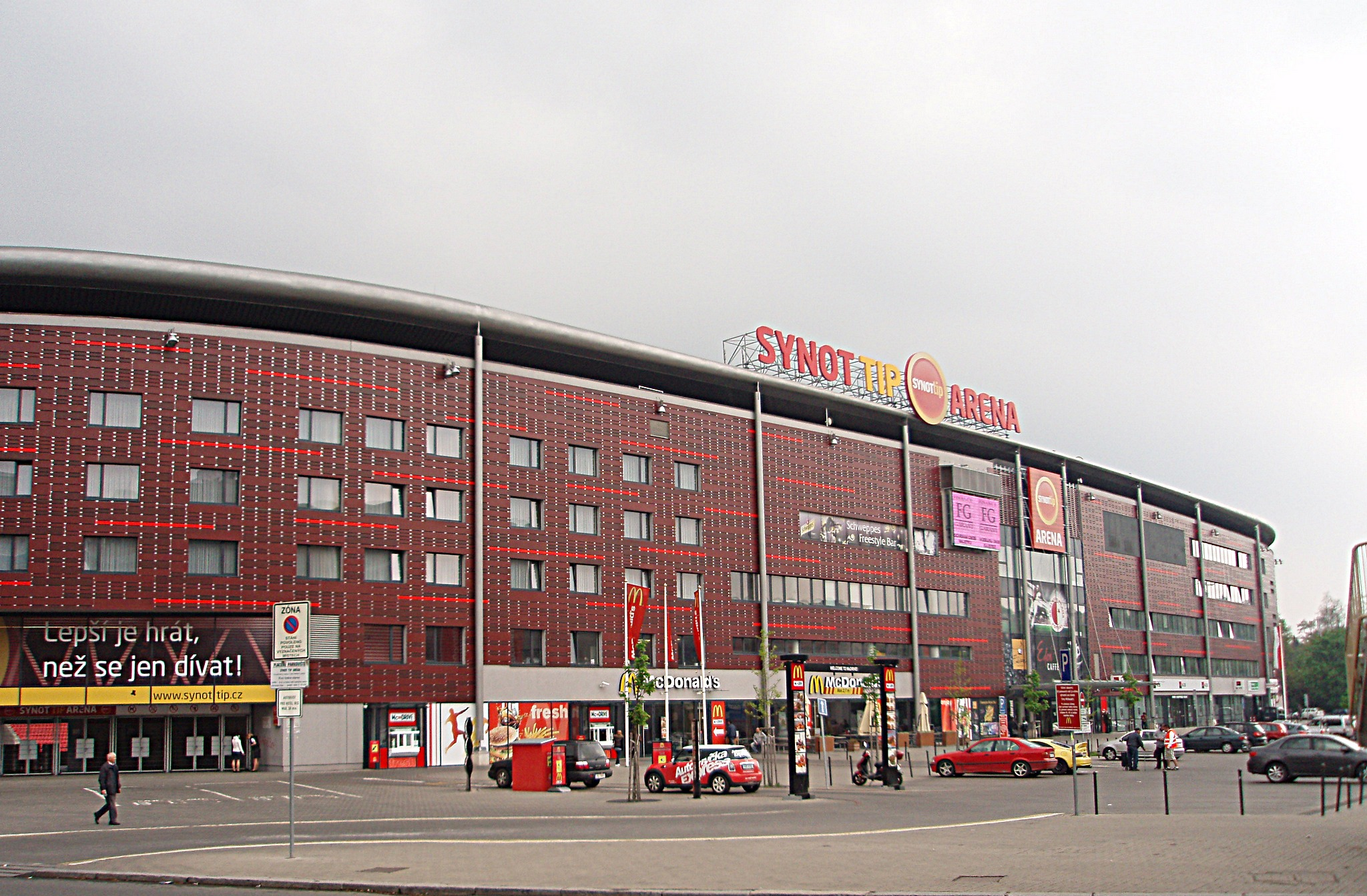
Front side

Slavia finally presented a project of the new stadium, but no construction started. In December 2003, the old Eden stadium was torn down and Slavia announced that the new stadium would be opened on 19 October 2005, however, by October 2005 the construction had not even started. It took another year to start. The project had to be scaled down to lower the construction cost from 1.8 billion Czech koruna to less than 1 billion. The construction eventually started in October 2006.

Despite the stadium not being fully finished, it was opened on 7 May 2008 with an exhibition match against Oxford University A.F.C. Many former Slavia stars (such as Pavel Kuka, Patrik Berger, Jan Suchopárek and Ivo Knoflíček) took part in this match, which Slavia won 5–0.

The first competitive match at the new stadium was played on 17 May 2008 against Jablonec, the match ended 2–2, Slavia secured the Czech First League title in this final match of the 2007/08 season.

In 2016, CEFC China Energy, who had previously purchased a majority stake in SK Slavia Prague, sought to buy a 70% stake in the stadium and announced plans to invest around €50 million (including the purchase price) to improve the stadium capacity and turn it into the main national stadium for the Czech Republic national team. In April 2017, it was announced that the details of the transaction have since changed and CEFC China Energy had purchased the stadium in full. The stadium was then renamed to Sinobo Stadium.

== Sponsorship ==
In July 2008, it was announced that betting company Synot Tip had made an agreement with E Side Property Limited, the owners of the stadium, regarding a sponsorship deal regarding one of the stands. In 2009, the stadium's name was officially changed to Synot Tip Arena.

In 2011, Natland Group were announced as the new majority owners of the stadium.

In 2012 it was announced that Synot would not be extending their sponsorship of the stadium past the end of the 2011–12 season.

In November 2018, the Chinese real estate company Sinobo Group became the majority owner of SK Slavia Praha, and the stadium was renamed Sinobo Stadium.

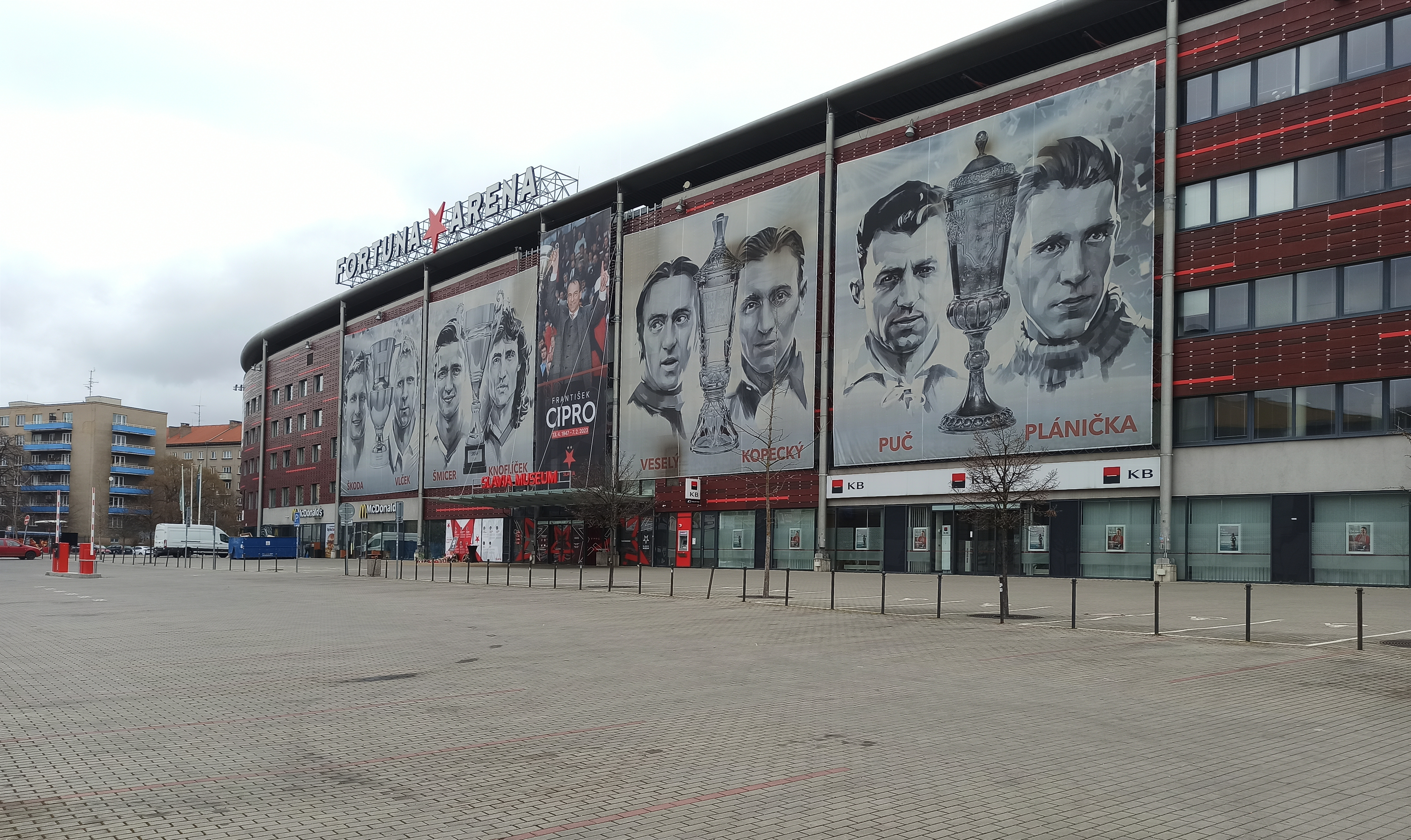
Fortuna Arena, February 2023

== International matches ==
Eden Arena has hosted 20 competitive matches and 4 friendly matches of the Czech Republic national football team.

27 May 2008
International friendly

Czech Republic	2 – 0	Lithuania
Koller 39', 62'	(Report)

Attendance: 14,220
Referee: Vladimír Hriňák (Slovakia)

14 October 2009
2010 FIFA World Cup qualification (UEFA)

Czech Republic	0 – 0	Northern Ireland
	(Report)

Attendance: 8,002
Referee: Laurent Duhamel (France)

8 October 2010
UEFA Euro 2012 qualifying

Czech Republic	1 – 0	Scotland
Hubník 70'	(Report)

Attendance: 14,922
Referee: Ivan Bebek (Croatia)

6 September 2013
2014 FIFA World Cup qualification (UEFA)

Czech Republic	1 – 2	Armenia
Rosický 70'	(Report)	Mkrtchyan 31'; Ghazaryan 90'

Attendance: 17,628
Referee: Antony Gautier (France)

5 March 2014
International friendly

Czech Republic	2 – 2	Norway
Rosický 11'; Vydra 39'	(Report)	Elyounoussi 21'; Pedersen 88'

Attendance: 17,039
Referee: Cüneyt Cakir (Turkey)

28 March 2015
UEFA Euro 2016 qualifying

Czech Republic	1 – 1	Latvia
Pilař 90'	(Report)	Višņakovs 30'

Attendance: 13,722
Referee: Javier Estrada Fernández (Spain)

5 June 2016
International friendly

Czech Republic	1 – 2	South Korea
Marek Suchý 46'	(Report)	Yoon Bit-garam 26'; Suk Hyun-jun 40'

Attendance: 16,490
Referee: Daniel Stefanski (Poland)

11 November 2016
2018 FIFA World Cup qualification (UEFA)

Czech Republic	2 – 1	Norway
Krmenčík 11'; Zmrhal 47'	(Report)	King 87'

Attendance: 16,411
Referee: Bas Nijhuis (Netherlands)

1 September 2017
2018 FIFA World Cup qualification (UEFA)

Czech Republic	1 – 2	Germany
Darida 78'	(Report)	Werner 4'; Hummels 88'

Attendance: 18,093
Referee: Sergei Karasev (Russia)

19 November 2018
2018–19 UEFA Nations League B

Czech Republic	1 – 0	Slovakia
Schick 32'	(Report)

Attendance: 16,623
Referee: Alejandro Hernández Hernández (Spain)

26 March 2019
International friendly

Czech Republic	1 – 3	Brazil
Pavelka 37'	(Report)	Firmino 49'; Gabriel Jesus 83', 90'

Attendance: 19,116
Referee: Ovidiu Hațegan (Romania)

11 October 2019
UEFA Euro 2020 qualifying

Czech Republic	2 – 1	England
Brabec 9'; Ondrášek 85'	(Report)	Kane 5' (pen.)

Attendance: 18,651
Referee: Damir Skomina (Slovenia)

27 March 2021
2022 FIFA World Cup qualification (UEFA)

Czech Republic	1 – 1	Belgium
Provod 50'	(Report)	R. Lukaku 60'

Attendance: 0
Referee: Willie Collum (Scotland)

8 October 2021
2022 FIFA World Cup qualification (UEFA)

Czech Republic	2 – 2	Wales
Pešek 38'; Ward 49' (o.g.)	(Report)	Ramsey 36'; James 69'

Attendance: 16,856
Referee: Deniz Aytekin (Germany)

2 June 2022
20:45 UTC+2
2022–23 UEFA Nations League

Czech Republic	2 – 1	Switzerland
Kuchta 11'; Sow 58' (o.g.)	Report	Okafor 44'

Attendance: 12,236
Referee: Daniel Siebert (Germany) / Harm Osmers (Germany) (substituted on) 75'

5 June 2022
20:45 UTC+2
2022–23 UEFA Nations League

Czech Republic	2 – 2	Spain
Pešek 4'; Kuchta 66'	Report	Gavi 45+3'; Martínez 90'

Attendance: 18,245
Referee: François Letexier (France)

24 September 2022
20:45 UTC+2
2022–23 UEFA Nations League

Czech Republic	0 – 4	Portugal
	Report	Dalot 33', 52'; Fernandes 45+2'; Jota 82'

Attendance: 19,322
Referee: Srđan Jovanović (Serbia)

24 March 2023
UEFA Euro 2024 qualifying

Czech Republic	3 – 1	Poland
Krejčí 1'; Čvančara 3'; Kuchta 64'	(Report)	D. Szymański 87'

Attendance: 19,045
Referee: Anastasios Sidiropoulos (Greece)

7 September 2023
UEFA Euro 2024 qualifying

Czech Republic	1 – 1	Albania
Černý 56'	(Report)	Bajrami 66'

Attendance: 18,641
Referee: Anthony Taylor (England)

10 September 2024
2024–25 UEFA Nations League

Czech Republic	3 – 2	Ukraine
Šulc 21', 45+2'; Souček 80' (pen.)	(Report)	Vanat 37'; Sudakov 84'

Attendance: 18,722
Referee: John Beaton (Scotland)

9 October 2025
2026 FIFA World Cup qualification (UEFA)

Czech Republic	0 – 0	Croatia
	(Report)

Attendance: 18,870
Referee: François Letexier (France)

26 March 2026
2026 FIFA World Cup qualification (UEFA)

Czech Republic	2 – 2 (a.e.t.)	Republic of Ireland
Schick 27' (pen.); Krejčí 86'	(Report)	Parrott 19' (pen.); Kovář 23' (o.g.)
Penalties
Krejčí (penalty scored); Souček (penalty scored); Chytil (penalty missed); Schick (penalty scored); Kliment (penalty scored)	4 – 3	(penalty scored) Parrott; (penalty scored) Idah; (penalty scored) Brady; (penalty missed) Azaz; (penalty missed) Browne

Attendance: 19,137
Referee: Glenn Nyberg (Sweden)

26 September 2026
2026–27 UEFA Nations League

Czech Republic	1 – 2	Croatia
Karabec 54'	(Report)	Modrić 47'; Marc. Pašalić 77'

Attendance: 15,421
Referee: Simone Sozza (Italy)

29 September 2026
2026–27 UEFA Nations League

Czech Republic	0 – 2	England
	(Report)	Gordon 47'; Kane 69'

Attendance: 18,930
Referee: Halil Umut Meler (Turkey)

== Other uses ==
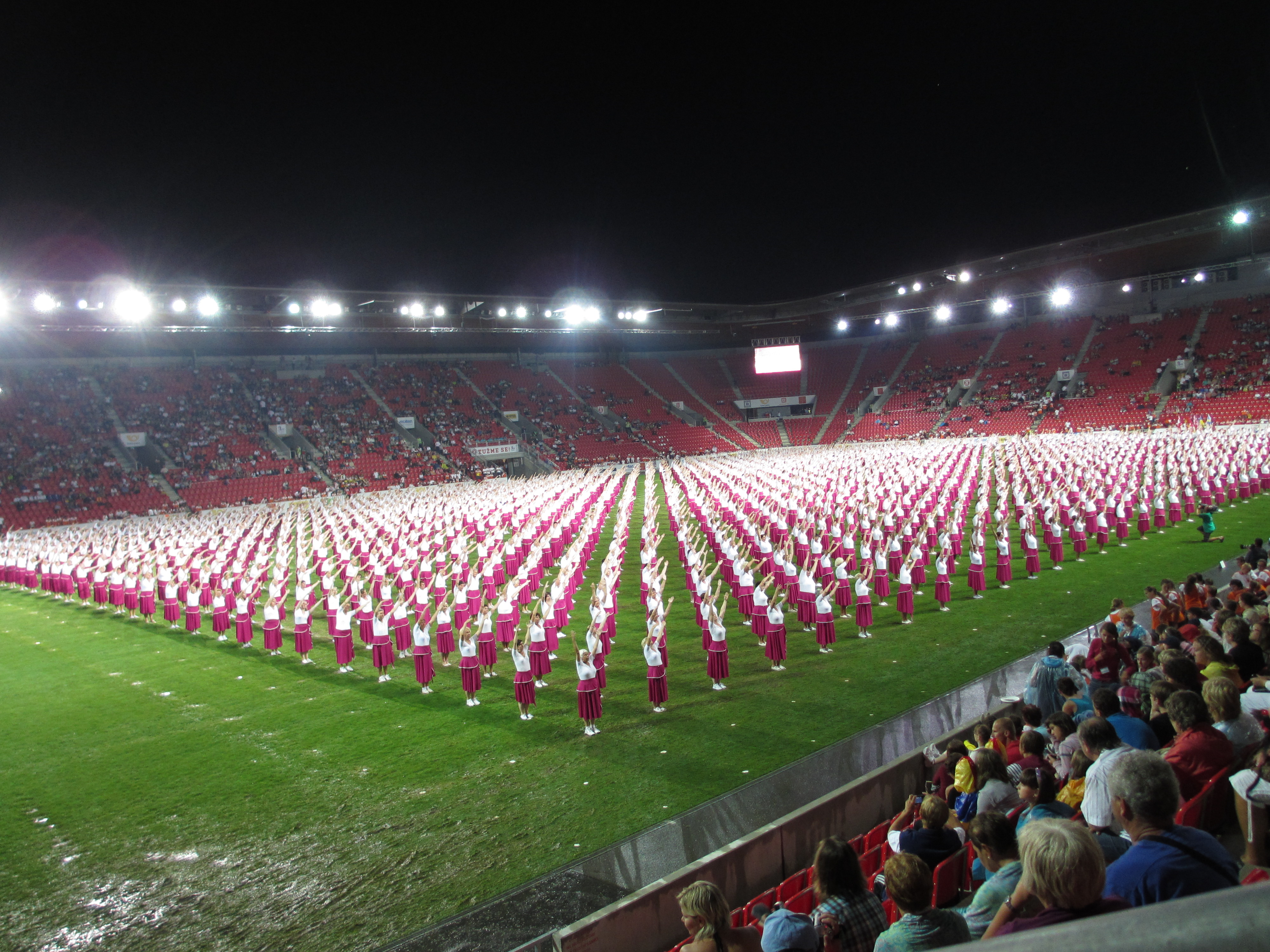
Sokol XV. slet in 2012

The stadium is occasionally used for other events beside football, such as concerts or other sports matches. In 2012, the Sokol slet, a mass gymnastics event, was held here.

The stadium was used for the final rugby matches of the 2008 and 2009–10 KB Extraliga seasons.

There is a hotel and a fan shop in the northern stand, and various other facilities (bar, McDonald's, Komerční banka branch, offices) in the main stand.

=== List of concerts ===
Date	Performer(s)	Tour/Event	Reference
3 June 2008	Metallica	European Summer Vacation	
8 August 2008	Iron Maiden	Somewhere Back in Time World Tour	
17 August 2008	R.E.M.	Accelerate Tour	
25 June 2009	Depeche Mode	Tour of the Universe	
20 July 2010	P!nk	The Funhouse Summer Carnival Tour	
7 May 2012	Metallica	2012 European Black Album Tour	
11 July 2012	Bruce Springsteen	Wrecking Ball World Tour	
16 September 2012	Coldplay	Mylo Xyloto Tour	
24 June 2013	Bon Jovi	Because We Can Tour	
23 July 2013	Depeche Mode	The Delta Machine Tour	
29 July 2013	Iron Maiden	Maiden England World Tour	
1 July 2016	Lucie	Lucie 30 let	
5 July 2016	Iron Maiden	The Book of Souls World Tour	
24 May 2017	Depeche Mode	Global Spirit Tour	
28 May 2017	Rammstein	Rammstein Festival Tour 2017	
29 May 2017	Rammstein	Rammstein Festival Tour 2017	
6 June 2019	Kabát	Po čertech velký turné	
19 June 2019	Kiss	End of the Road World Tour	
16 July 2019	Rammstein	Rammstein Stadium Tour	
17 July 2019	Rammstein	Rammstein Stadium Tour	
20 June 2022	Iron Maiden	Legacy of the Beast World Tour	
16 June 2023	Marek Ztracený	–	
17 June 2023	Marek Ztracený	–	
18 June 2023	Marek Ztracený	–	
7 June 2025	Ben Cristovao	–	
13 June 2026	Ewa Farna		
14 June 2026	Ewa Farna		
16 June 2026	Ewa Farna		

== Transport ==
The stadium is served by buses, trams, and trains, with stops for buses and trams using the name Slavia - Nádraží Eden while the train stop is called Praha-Eden. Trams run along Vršovická street, north of the stadium, while bus services 135, 136, 150 and 213 stop on U Slavie street, immediately west of the stadium. The nearest metro station is Želivského.

Preceded by Stade Louis II; Monaco	UEFA Super Cup; Match venue 2013	Succeeded by Cardiff City Stadium; Cardiff
