= RC Zlín =

Czech rugby union club, based in Zlín

- Full name: Rugby Club Zlín
- Founded: 1944; 82 years ago
- Location: Zlín, Czech Republic
- Ground: Stadion Mládeže
- President: (Czech Republic) Josef Iž
- Coach: (Czech Republic) Martin Kotík
- Captain: (Czech Republic) Tomaš Novosád
- League: Extraliga ragby XV
1st kit	2nd kit

RC Zlín is a Czech rugby union club in Zlín. They currently play in the Extraliga ragby XV.

== History ==
The club was founded in 1944.

In 1982 they undertook a tour to France, paying a visit to the grave of William Webb Ellis in Menton and winning a sevens tournament in Montpellier.

== Historical names ==
- SK Bat'a Zlín (1947)
- ZK Bat'a Zlín (1948)
- Sokol Borostroj Zlín (1948)
- Sokol Svit (1949)
- Jiskra Gottwaldov (1953)
- Spartak Gottwaldov (1953)
- TJ Gottwaldov (1958)
- SK Zlín (1990)
- RC Zlín (1993)
