= Praga Rugby =

Czech rugby union club, based in Prague

- Full name: Rugby Club Praga Praha, z.s.
- Founded: 1944; 82 years ago
- Location: Prague, Czech Republic
- President: (Czech Republic) Luděk Kudláček
- Coach: (Czech Republic) Roman Šuster
- Captain: (Czech Republic) Tomáš Matras
- League: Extraliga ragby XV
- 2023: 5th
1st kit	2nd kit

Praga Rugby is a Czech rugby union club based in Prague. They currently play in the Extraliga ragby XV and are considered to be one of the strongest teams in the Czech Republic.

== History ==
The club was founded in 1944.

Former club logo

== Honours ==
- Czechoslovak Championships
  - 1948, 1955, 1960, 1962, 1963, 1966, 1972, 1982, 1983, 1984, 1986, 1987, 1988, 1992, 2002, 2014, 2015
- Extraliga ragby XV
  - 2002
  - 2010 (sevens)
  - 2011 (sevens)

== Former names ==
- 1944-45 Radostně Vpřed
- 1945-48 LTC Praha
- 1949-50 TJ Textilia Praha (Tělovýchovná jednota Textilia Praha)
- 1951–52 TJ Sokol Autopraga (Tělovýchovná jednota Sokol Autopraga)
- 1953–67 TJ Spartak AZKG Praha
- 1968–2006 TJ Praga Praha (Tělovýchovná jednota Praga Praha)
- 2007– RC Praga Praha

== Team management ==
- Head Coach: Roman Šuster
- Rugby Coaches: Pavel Šťastný, Michal Kinter
- Athletic Coach: Václav Pokorný
- Physio: Michal Přibyl, Filip Strakoš
