= RC Slavia Prague =

Czech rugby union club, based in Prague

Rugby Club Slavia Prague
- Full name: Rugby Club Slavia Praha
- Nickname(s): Hvězdy (Stars) - A-team; Nosorožci (Rhinos) - B-team
- Founded: 1927; 99 years ago
- Location: Prague, Czech Republic
- Ground: Ragbyove hřiště v Edenu
- President: (Czech Republic) Petr Ryvola
- Coach(es): (Czech Republic) Jan Macháček (player-coach) (Czech Republic) Vítek Chalupa (player-coach)
- League: Extraliga ragby XV
Team kit

RC Slavia Prague is a Czech rugby union club based in Prague. They currently play in the Extraliga ragby XV and are the oldest existing club in the Czech Republic. The club forms part of the Slavia Prague sports network.

== History ==
Former club logo

The club was founded on 13 April 1927. On 7 May of that year, the first rugby match in Prague took place at Slavia, with Slavia Bratislava squaring off against Slavia Brno.

Slavia were the first winners of the Czechoslovak Championships, back in 1929. It turned out to be the start of a very successful period for them, winning five out of the first six championships.

The club has supplied a number of internationals over the years, among others Jan Macháček, one of arguably the two most well-known Czech rugby players (the other being Martin Jágr).

== Historical names ==
- 1927 - SK Slavia Praha (Sportovní klub Slavia Praha)
- 1951 – Dynamo Praha
- 1964 – TJ Slavia Praha IPS (Tělovýchovná jednota Slavia Praha Inženýrské průmyslové stavby)
- 1988 – SK Slavia Praha (Sportovní klub Slavia Praha)
- 1993 – RC Slavia Praha (Rugby Club Slavia Praha)

== Honours ==
- Czechoslovak Championships
  - 1929, 1930, 1932, 1933, 1934, 1956, 1957, 1958, 1961, 1964, 1969, 1971
- Extraliga ragby XV
  - 2010

== Notable players ==
- (Czech Republic) Zdenek Barchánek
- (Czech Republic) Jan Macháček
