= Czech Rugby Union =

Sports governing body in the Czech Republic

Česká rugbyová unie
- Sport: Rugby union
- Founded: 1926; 100 years ago
- World Rugby affiliation: 1988
- Rugby Europe affiliation: 1934
- President: Dušan Palcr (2019–)
- Men's coach: Thomasz Putra (2013–)
- Women's coach: Daniel Beneš

The Czech Rugby Union (Czech: Česká rugbyová unie) is the governing body for rugby union in the Czech Republic. It was founded in 1926 and became affiliated to the International Rugby Board in 1988 while still the governing body for Czechoslovakia. It organises the two leagues, the Extraliga ragby XV and 1. Liga ragby XV, and the various national teams. It is based in Prague.

== History ==
Rugby was first brought to Czech lands while it was part of Austria-Hungary in 1895 but it did not gain popularity after a match at the Prague Yacht Club organised by Josef Rössler-Ořovský. In 1926 following Czechoslovakia's independence, the Czech writer Ondřej Sekora returned to his hometown Brno from France with a rugby ball and a French copy of the laws of rugby union. Sekora translated the laws into Czech and trained two teams to compete in the nation's first rugby match. This was when the Czechoslovak Rugby Union was founded. In 1934, they were one of the founder members of the Fédération Internationale de Rugby Amateur (FIRA). Under communist rule, until 1989, all rugby stadiums were paid for and maintained by the local municipalities. This was despite rugby being a minority sport in Czechoslovakia.

In 2016, to celebrate the 90th anniversary of the Czech Rugby Union, they hosted the Barbarians for a match against the Czech Republic national rugby union team in Prague. In the same year, they restructured 1. Liga ragby XV to be split into Bohemia and Moravia with the winners of each group gaining promotion to Extraliga ragby XV. In 2023, it was announced by Rugby Europe (formerly FIRA) that the Czech Rugby Union would host the Rugby Europe Under-18 Championship and Rugby Europe Under-18 Championship until 2027. In 2024, the Czech Rugby Union announced a partnership with the French Rugby Federation in order to assist with coaching with the aim of getting the Czech Republic women's national rugby sevens team to qualify for the 2028 Summer Olympics.

== See also ==
- Rugby union in the Czech Republic
