= RC Sparta Prague =

Czech rugby union club, based in Prague

Rugby Club Sparta Prague
- Full name: Rugby Club Sparta Praha
- Founded: 1928; 98 years ago
- Location: Prague, Czech Republic
- Ground: Podvinný mlýn
- President: (Czech Republic) Zdeněk Albrecht
- Coach: (Czech Republic) Jan Havlíček
- Captain: (Czech Republic) Luděk Bredler
- League: Extraliga ragby XV
- 2023: 2nd
1st kit	2nd kit

RC Sparta Prague is a Czech rugby union club based in Prague. They currently play in the Extraliga ragby XV and are the second oldest club in the Czech Republic after Slavia Prague. The club forms part of the Sparta Prague sports network.

== History ==
=== Early years ===
The club was officially founded on 28 August 1928, with the first coach being Frenchman Andrée Cannellas. Their first match was on 28 April 1929 against VŠ sport Brno. Later on in 1929 they took on fellow Prague side Slavia Prague, the latter prevailing 23–3. They did however manage to beat Slavia 8-0 not too long afterwards.

In 1931 Sparta won their first of five Czechoslovak championship titles and supplied a number of players to the national team that took on Germany in Leipzig.

The club prospered for a while, with many new members joining. But disaster struck in 1934 when the grandstand caught fire, destroying all the club's equipment.

=== 1944 to the present ===
Rugby activity in the then Czechoslovakia was only resumed in 1944, due to the intervention of the Second World War.

After playing in the first division for many years, they were relegated to the second division in 1957.

The years 1968 to 1973 saw the club's first Golden Age, winning the championship in 1968 and 1973.

The 1980s were not particularly good for the club, with the low point coming in 1985, when they finished last in the first division. This led to a rebuilding phase lasting from 1986 to 1990, culminating in the championship win in 1990.

The club moved to their present field in 1982.

Sparta's second Golden Age occurred in 1998 and 1999, with back-to-back KB Extraliga titles.

Historical names:

Former RC Sparta Prague logo

- 1928 – Athletic Club Sparta
- 1950 – Sparta Bratrství
- 1951 – Sparta Praha Sokolovo
- 1965 – Sparta Praha
- 1970 – Sparta ĆKD Praha
- 1989 – RC Sparta Praha

== Honours ==
- Czechoslovak Championships
  - 1931, 1967, 1968, 1973, 1990
- Extraliga ragby XV
  - 1998, 1999, 2017, 2019

== Notable former players ==
- (Czech Republic) Martin Jágr
