= RK Petrovice =

Czech rugby union club, based in Prague

- Full name: Rugby Klub Petrovice
- Union: Czech Rugby Union
- Founded: 1944; 82 years ago
- Location: Prague, Czech Republic
- Ground: Grammova 2, 109 00 Praha
- President: (Czech Republic) Tomáš Pešír
- Director of Rugby: (Czech Republic) Raymond Burnard
- Coach: (Czech Republic) Přemysl Brádle
- Captain: (Czech Republic) Tomáš Chadim
- League: 1. Liga ragby XV
1st kit	2nd kit

Official website
- www.rkpetrovice.cz

RK Petrovice is a Czech rugby union club in Petrovice, Prague. They currently play in the 1. Liga ragby XV in the Czech Republic.

== History ==
The club was founded in 1944. After having played in Troja, Stodůlky, Lhotka and Nebušice, they started playing in Petrovice in 1980, which came about after club member Otto Kodera discovered a disused football field.

== Historical names ==
- Radostně vpřed a HC Blesk (1944)
- I. ČLTK (1945–49)
- Sokol Praha 1 (1950)
- TJ Motorlet Praha (1950–91)
- RK Petrovice (1992-)
