= RC Tatra Smíchov =

Czech rugby union club, based in Prague

Tatra Smíchov
- Full name: Rugby Club Tatra Smíchov
- Founded: 1958; 68 years ago
- Location: Prague, Czech Republic
- Ground: Stadion ragby Císařka
- President: (Czech Republic) Roman Rygl
- Coach: (Czech Republic) Josef Fatka
- League: Extraliga ragby XV
- 2022: 2nd
1st kit	2nd kit

RC Tatra Smíchov is a Czech rugby union club in Smíchov, Prague. They currently play in the Extraliga ragby XV. The club was founded in 1958.

== Honours ==
- Czechoslovak Cup
  - 1980, 1981, 1983
- Czech Cup
  - 1995, 1997
- Extraliga ragby XV
  - 1995, 1997, 2003, 2007, 2008, 2013, 2018, 2025

== Historical names ==
- 1958 - 1993 TJ Tatra Smíchov ČKD (Tělovýchovná jednota Tatra Smíchov Českomoravská Kolben-Daněk)
- 1994 - RC Tatra Smíchov
