= Extraliga ragby XV =

Czech rugby union competition

- Sport: Rugby union
- Founded: 1993; 33 years ago
- No. of teams: 7
- Country: Czech Republic
- Most recent champion: RC Mountfield Říčany
- Most titles: RC Mountfield Říčany (12)
- Level on pyramid: 1
- Relegation to: 1. Liga ragby XV
- Website: Czech Rugby Union: Extraliga rugby XV

The Extraliga rugby XV is a rugby club competition played in the Czech Republic and is the top level of rugby in the country. There is a promotion-relegation process between the Extraliga ragby and the 1. Liga ragby XV. The league used to be known as KB Extraliga due to sponsorship by Komerční banka (KB) which lasted until the 2014/15 season.

The season usually runs from September to May, although in the 2008 season, it was only from August through November 2008. Since 2008 the final has been played at the Synot Tip Arena in Prague.

RC Mountfield Říčany are the current champions.

== History ==
The league was first played in 1993, with Vyškov as the first champions. Prior to the foundation of the league, clubs competed in the Czechoslovak Championship.

It became known under the KB Extraliga name in 2003, when KB started sponsoring the Czech Rugby Union, as well as the national teams and leagues. For the 2016/17 season the name changed to Extraliga ragby in line with the Czech rugby union league system restructure. In 2021 the name changed to Extraliga ragby XV.

== Current teams ==
2024 season

Location of teams in the Extraliga ragby XV 2024

Club	Full name	City	Stadium
RC Dragon Brno	Rugby Club Dragon Brno	Brno	Brno - Maloměřice, Cacovická ul., Za mlýnem
RC Praga Praha	Rugby Club Praga Rugby	Prague 9	Praha 9 - Vysočany, u Rokytky 1025/37
RC Mountfield Říčany	Rugby Club Mountfield Říčany	Říčany	Stadion Josefa Kohouta, Široká 150/22
RC Slavia Prague	Rugby Club Slavia Praha	Prague 10	Praha 10 - Eden, Vladivostocká 10
RC Sparta Prague	Rugby Club Sparta Praha	Prague 9	Aréna Sparta Podvinný mlýn - Kovanecká 2405/27
RC Tatra Smíchov	Rugby Club Tatra Smíchov	Prague 5	Stadion ragby Císařka, Podbělohorská (Smrčínská) street
RC Vyškov	JIMI Rugby Club Vyškov	Vyškov	Areál Jana Navrátila, Purkyňova 419
RC Zlín	Rugby Club Zlín	Zlín	Stadion Mládeže, Hradská 854

== Results ==
With the exception of the 2008 season onwards, all finals were played over at least two legs (an additional match being played whenever both teams have won a leg). The score given is that of the deciding match.

The scores in blue are links to accounts of finals on the site of the Czech Rugby Union (ČSRU) - in Czech

Year	Champion	Score	Runner-up	Place
1993	JIMI RC Vyškov		RC Říčany
1994	JIMI RC Vyškov		TJ Praga Praha
1995	RC Tatra Smíchov		RC Sparta Prague
1996	RC Říčany	6:9, 23:9	RC Dragon Brno
1997	RC Tatra Smíchov	21:10, 7:10	RC Říčany
1998	RC Sparta Prague	24:23, 15:18	TJ Praga Praha
1999	RC Sparta Prague	18:5, 24:37, 6:13	RC Říčany
2000	RC Dragon Brno	24:29, 44:3, 22:28	JIMI RC Vyškov
2001	RC Říčany	15-11	TJ Praga Praha	Stadion Josefa Kohouta, Říčany
2002	TJ Praga Praha	53-30	RC Tatra Smíchov	Stadion ragby Císařka, Prague
2003	RC Tatra Smíchov	20-15	RC Říčany	Stadion Josefa Kohouta, Říčany
2004	RC Říčany	36-12	JIMI RC Vyškov	Areál Jana Navrátila, Vyškov
2005	RC Říčany	23-20	RC Tatra Smíchov	Stadion ragby Císařka, Prague
2006	RC Říčany	12-6	RC Tatra Smíchov	Stadion Josefa Kohouta, Říčany
2007	RC Tatra Smíchov	13-12	RC Říčany	Stadion ragby Císařka, Prague
2008	RC Tatra Smíchov	17-9	RC Říčany	Synot Tip Arena, Prague
2010	RC Slavia Prague	11-10	RC Tatra Smíchov	Synot Tip Arena, Prague
2011	RC Mountfield Říčany	21-10	RC Slavia Prague	Stadion Josefa Kohouta, Říčany
2012	RC Mountfield Říčany	25-11	RC Rental.cz Havířov	Stadion Josefa Kohouta, Říčany
2013	RC Tatra Smíchov	39-20	RC Praga Praha	Stadion ragby Císařka, Praha 5 - Smíchov
2014	RC Praga Praha	23-10	RC Sparta Prague	Praga (Praha 9-Vysočany)
2015	RC Praga Praha	41-7	JIMI RC Vyškov	Praga (Praha 9-Vysočany)
2016	JIMI RC Vyškov	29-20	RC Tatra Smíchov	Areál Jana Navrátila, Vyškov
2017	RC Sparta Prague	20-6	RC Tatra Smíchov	Stadion ČSRU Markéta, Praha 6 - Petřiny
2018	RC Tatra Smíchov	30-19	JIMI RC Vyškov	Stadion ragby Císařka, Praha 5 - Smíchov
2019	RC Sparta Prague	40-3	RC Tatra Smíchov	Aréna Sparta, Podvinný mlýn, Praha 9
2020	cancelled
2021	RC Mountfield Říčany	not played	JIMI RC Vyškov
2022	RC Mountfield Říčany	45–8	RC Tatra Smíchov
2023	RC Mountfield Říčany	16–9	RC Sparta Prague
2024	RC Mountfield Říčany	28–14	RC Praga Praha
2025	RC Tatra Smíchov	27–20	RC Mountfield Říčany
2026	RC Mountfield Říčany	19–12	RC Tatra Smíchov

== Performance by club ==
Club	Winners	Runners-up	Winning years
RC Mountfield Říčany	12	7	1996, 2001, 2004, 2005, 2006, 2011, 2012, 2021, 2022, 2023, 2024, 2026
RC Tatra Smíchov	8	8	1995, 1997, 2003, 2007, 2008, 2013, 2018, 2025
RC Sparta Prague	4	3	1998, 1999, 2017, 2019
RC Praga Praha	3	5	2002, 2014, 2015
JIMI RC Vyškov	3	5	1993, 1994, 2016
RC Dragon Brno	1	1	2000
RC Slavia Prague	1	1	2010
RC Havířov	0	1	

=== Regions ===
The following table lists the Czech rugby champions by region.

Region	Titles	Winning clubs
Prague	16	Tatra Smíchov (8), Sparta Prague (4), Praga Rugby (3), Slavia Prague (1)
Central Bohemia	12	Mountfield Říčany (12)
South Moravia	4	JIMI Vyškov (3), Dragon Brno (1)

== See also ==
- Rugby union in the Czech Republic
