= RC Dragon Brno =

Czech rugby union club, based in Brno

Dragon Brno
- Full name: Rugby Club Dragon Brno, z.s.
- Founded: 1946; 80 years ago (as Sokol Brno I)
- Location: Brno, Czech Republic
- President: (Czech Republic) Jan Hlavac
- Coach(es): (Czech Republic) Ondřej Kutil (Czech Republic) Nigel Briggs
- League: Extraliga ragby XV
Team kit

RC Dragon Brno is a Czech rugby union club in Brno. They currently play in the Extraliga ragby XV. They have also been involved in the Central & Eastern European Rugby Cup since its inception in 2008.

== History ==
Former club logo

The club started out as Sokol Brno I, with the name changing to Sokol Zbrojovka Brno in 1951. Following the nationwide restructuring of Physical Education and Sport in 1953, which affected rugby among others, the Sokol Zbrojovka Brno club split in two, Spartak Zbrojovka Brno and Slavia VŠ Brno (now RC Bystrc).

== Honours ==
- Czechoslovak Championships
  - 1950, 1965
- Czech Cup
  - 2000
- Extraliga ragby XV
  - 2000

== Historical names ==
- 1946 - 1950 Sokol Brno I
- 1951 - 1952 Sokol Zbrojovka Brno
- 1953 Spartak Zbrojovka Brno
- 1954 - 1968 Spartak ZJŠ Brno
- 1969 - 1990 TJ Zbrojovka Brno
- 1991 - RC Dragon Brno

== Coaches ==
- Jiří Náprstek (1946–1948)
- Viktor Šťastný (1949)
- Jiří Náprstek (1950–1951)
- Viktor Šťastný (1952)
- Jiří Náprstek (1953–1955)
- Oldřich Pazdera (1956–1963)
- Ladislav Baloun (1964)
- Viktor Šťastný (1964–1973)
- Vítězslav Smrž (1974)
- Viktor Šťastný (1975–1987)
- Milan Buryánek, Jiří Šťastný (1987–1990)
- Milan Buryánek, Vítězslav Dosedla Sr. (1990–1993)
- Jiří Šťastný, Břetislav Vlk Sr. (1993–2002)
- Jiří Šťastný, Břetislav Vlk Sr., Milan Buryánek (2003–2006)
- Zdenek Zapletal, Karel Trojan (2006)
- Zdenek Zapletal, Břetislav Vlk Jr. (2007)
- Jiří Šťastný, Milan Buryánek (2008-)
