= RC Říčany =

Czech rugby union club, based in Říčany

- Full name: Rugby Club Říčany
- Founded: 1944; 82 years ago
- Location: Říčany, Czech Republic
- Ground: Stadion Josefa Kohouta
- President: (Czech Republic) David Frydrych
- Coach: (Czech Republic) Antonín Brabec (player-coach)
- League: Extraliga ragby XV
Team kit

Club logo until 2010

RC Říčany (known as RC Mountfield Říčany for sponsorship reasons) is a Czech rugby club based in Říčany. They currently play in the Extraliga ragby XV. Since 2009 they also compete in the Central & Eastern European Rugby Cup along with fellow Czechs Dragon Brno.

== History ==
RC Říčany was founded in 1944 by Josef Kohout, after which the club's home ground is named.

The club had a tough start, as World War II was still pretty much in full force. People were living in fear for the Gestapo or being sent to work in Germany.

Initially, they played only friendly matches, including a match against an Anglo-American forces side in 1946.

1952 saw the temporary cessation of rugby activity, owing to the lack of skilled players and competent officials, problems with the playing field and financial struggles.

In 1956 the club restarted again, with more focus on developing home-grown players, and with Josef Kohout still a major driving force behind the club.

The club celebrated their 65th anniversary in 2009.

== Historical names ==
- DTJ Říčany (1944)
- Meteor Říčany (1946–49)
- TJ Sokol Říčany (1950–66)
- TJ Sokol Disk Říčany (1967–87)
- TJ Sokol Spoje Říčany (1988–89)
- Rugby Club Říčany (1990–2010)
- Rugby Club Mountfield Říčany (2011–)

== Honours ==
- Extraliga ragby XV
  - 1996, 2001, 2004, 2005, 2006, 2011, 2012, 2021, 2022, 2023

== Notable former players ==
- (Czech Republic) Josef Kohout
- (Czech Republic) Martin Cimprich
