= 2014 Finnish Championship League =

- Countries: Finland
- Date: 17 May 2014 – 27 September 2014

Official website
- www.rugby.fi

The 2014 Finnish Championship League competition is a Finnish domestic rugby union club competition operated by the Suomen Rugbyliitto.

== Fixtures ==
=== Week 1 ===
17 May 2014
11:00

Warriors	45 – 5	Porvoo

Myllypuro sports park
Referee: Steve Whittaker

17 May 2014
13:00

Helsinki	30 – 5	Pori

Myllypuro sports park
Referee: Palemia Field

=== Week 2 ===
24 May 2014
13:00

Espoo	53 - 27	Kuopio

Otaniemen urheilukenttä
Referee: George Mossford

24 May 2014
14:00

Turku	15 - 41	Jyväskylä

Impivaaran kenttä
Referee: Chris Gibbons

24 May 2014
15:00

Vaasa	12 - 0	Porvoo

Vaskiluodon kenttä
Referee: Isaac Visser

=== Week 3 ===
31 May 2014

Pori	10 - 28	Vaasa

Pihlavan urheilukenttä
Referee: Mark Kipkoech

=== Week 4 ===
7 June 2014

Kuopio	8 - 38	Jyväskylä

Puijon stadioni
Referee: Chris Gibbons

7 June 2014
14:00

Tampere	22 - 29	Warriors
Try: Valtteri Väyrynen (2), Christiaan Freeman; Con: Henrico Harnoster, Mikko Luopio; Pen: Mikko Luopio

Vehmaisten urheilukenttä
Attendance: 70
Referee: Stephen Evans

=== Week 5 ===
14 June 2014
16:00

Pori	20 - 47	Tampere
		Try: Otto Nojonen (2), Jari Virtanen, Ilkka Tuomaala, Jani Lehtinen, Antti Kemppainen, Mikko Luopio; Con: Mikko Luopio (3); Pen: Mikko Luopio (2)

Pihlavan urheilukenttä
Attendance: 80
Referee: Chris Gibbons

14 June 2014

Jyväskylä	62 - 10	Porvoo

Laukaan urheilukenttä
Referee: Bro Bannatyne

=== Week 6 ===
28 June 2014

Pori	0 - 72	Warriors

Pihlavan urheilukenttä
Referee: Chris Gibbons

28 June 2014
15:30

Kuopio	61 - 26	Tampere
		Try: Henrico Harnoster (2), Pauli Myllymäki, Jari Virtanen; Con: Henrico Harnoster (3)

Puijon stadioni
Referee: Seb Garcia

28 June 2014

Jyväskylä	43 - 26	Vaasa

Laukaan urheilukenttä
Referee: Mark Kipkoech

28 June 2014

Turku	47 - 24	Espoo

Impivaaran kenttä
Referee: George Mossford

=== Week 7 ===
5 July 2014

Warriors	10 - 50	Helsinki

Myllypuro sports park
Referee: Palemia Field

5 July 2014

Turku	71 - 20	Pori

Impivaaran kenttä
Referee: Steve Whittaker

5 July 2014

Porvoo	12 - 19	Kuopio

Kokonniemen liikuntapuisto
Referee: Atso Juntunen

=== Week 8 ===
12 July 2014

Kuopio	12 - 36	Warriors

Puijon stadioni
Referee: Mark Kipkoech

12 July 2014

Porvoo	15 - 29	Espoo

Kokonniemen liikuntapuisto
Referee: Palemia Field

12 July 2014

Vaasa	70 - 0 (forfeit)	Tampere

=== Week 9 ===
19 July 2014

Warriors	29 - 30	Vaasa

Myllypuro sports park
Referee: George Mossford

19 July 2014

Jyväskylä	62 - 0	Espoo

Laukaan urheilukenttä
Referee: Emmi Laine

19 July 2014

Kuopio	53 - 10	Turku

Puijon stadioni
Referee: Thierry Demoulin

=== Week 10 ===
26 July 2014

Porvoo	46 - 3	Pori

Kokonniemen liikuntapuisto
Referee: Mark Kipkoech

26 July 2014

Helsinki	53 - 19	Espoo

Myllypuro sports park
Referee: Mathias Solana

=== Week 11 ===
2 August 2014

Pori	0 - 70 (forfeit)	Jyväskylä

2 August 2014
13:00

Espoo	5 - 31	Tampere
		Try: Valtteri Väyrynen, Henrico Haarnoster, Mikko Luopio, Christiaan Freeman, Aleksi Aalto; Con: Mikko Luopio (3)

Otaniemen urheilukenttä
Attendance: 35
Referee: Mathias Solana

2 August 2014

Turku	27 - 19	Vaasa

Impivaaran kenttä
Referee: Thierry Demoulin

=== Week 12 ===
9 August 2014

Tampere	47 - 10	Turku
Try: Ilkka Tuomaala, Jesse Metsänen, Henrico Harnoster (2), Valtteri Väyrynen, Christiaan Freeman (2); Con: Mikko Luopio (6)

Vehmaisten urheilukenttä
Attendance: 120
Referee: Thierry Demoulin

9 August 2014

Porvoo	12 - 25	Helsinki

Kokonniemen liikuntapuisto
Referee: George Mossford

9 August 2014

Espoo	0 - 70 (forfeit)	Vaasa

=== Week 13 ===
16 August 2014

Jyväskylä	12 - 19	Helsinki

Laukaan urheilukenttä

16 August 2014

Warriors	36 - 0	Turku

Myllypuro sports park

=== Week 14 ===
23 August 2014

Helsinki	25 - 15	Turku

Myllypuro sports park

23 August 2014

Tampere	31 - 19	Porvoo
Try: Aleksi Aalto (3), Antti Kemppainen (2); Con: Mikko Luopio (3)

Vehmaisten urheilukenttä
Attendance: 80

23 August 2014

Vaasa	48 - 7	Kuopio

Vaskiluodon kenttä

=== Week 15 ===
30 August 2014

Jyväskylä	17 - 37	Tampere
		Try: Henrico Haarnoster (2), Ilkka Tuomaala, Mikko Luopio; Con: Mikko Luopio (4); Pen: Mikko Luopio (3)

Laukaan urheilukenttä

30 August 2014

Pori	22 - 35	Espoo

Pihlavan urheilukenttä

30 August 2014

Helsinki	39 - 15	Kuopio

Myllypuro sports park

=== Week 16 ===
6 September 2014

Warriors	53 - 26	Jyväskylä

Myllypuro sports park

6 September 2014

Vaasa	12 - 27	Helsinki

Vaskiluodon kenttä

=== Week 17 ===
13 September 2014

Espoo	15 - 31	Warriors

Otaniemen urheilukenttä

13 September 2014
13:30

Tampere	16 - 19	Helsinki
Try: Otto Nojonen; Con: Mikko Luopio; Pen: Mikko Luopio(3)

Vehmaisten urheilukenttä
Attendance: 120

13 September 2014

Kuopio	104 - 0	Pori

Puijon stadioni

13 September 2014

Porvoo	38 - 24	Turku

Kokonniemen liikuntapuisto

== Playoffs ==
Semifinals
1	Helsinki	24
4	Tampere	0
2	Warriors	21
3	Jyväskylä	20

Final
Helsinki	12
Warriors	5

=== Semi-finals ===
20 September 2014
15:00

Helsinki	24 - 0	Tampere

Myllypuro sports park
Attendance: 210

20 September 2014
11:00

Warriors	21 - 20	Jyväskylä

Myllypuro sports park

=== Final ===
27 September 2014

Helsinki	12 - 5	Warriors

Kokonniemen liikuntapuisto
Referee: Chris Gibbons
