= List of Czech Republic women's national rugby union team matches =

The following is a list of the Czech Republic women's national rugby union team matches.

== Overall ==
The Czech Republic's overall international match record against all nations is as follows:

	Games Played	Won	Drawn	Lost	Win %
Total	25	8	3	14	32%

== Full internationals ==
Won	Lost	Draw

=== 2004–05 ===
Test	Date	Opponent	PF	PA	Venue	Event
1	5 June 2004	Austria	5	5	Hohe Warte, Vienna	Test match
2	30 April 2005	Austria	5	5	Hohe Warte, Vienna	Test match

=== 2013–19 ===
Test	Date	Opponent	PF	PA	Venue	Event
3	29 June 2013	Switzerland	15	27	Smíchov Stadium, Prague	
4	16 November 2013	Switzerland	0	42	Nyon	
5	29 June 2014	Switzerland	3	32	Prague, Czech Republic	2014 RET
6	29 October 2015	Belgium	3	20	Unterägeri, Switzerland	2015 RET
7	1 November 2015	Russia	15	41	Unterägeri, Switzerland	2015 RET
8	9 October 2016	Spain	0	97	Complutense, Madrid	2017 RWCQ
9	12 October 2016	Belgium	5	20	Complutense, Madrid	2017 RWCQ
10	15 October 2016	Switzerland	12	24	Complutense, Madrid	2017 RWCQ
11	28 October 2018	Germany	0	25	Berlin	
12	17 November 2018	Switzerland	10	5	Yverdon-les-Bains, Switzerland	2018–19 RET
13	16 March 2019	Finland	15	0	Prague, Czech Republic	2018–19 RET
14	12 October 2019	Finland	5	5	Helsinki, Finland	2019–20 RET
15	9 November 2019	Switzerland	15	5	Brno, Czech Republic	2019–20 RET
16	16 November 2019	Sweden	17	5	Prague, Czech Republic	2019–20 RET

=== 2021–23 ===
Test	Date	Opponent	PF	PA	Venue	Event
17	30 October 2021	Sweden	12	31	Norrköping, Sweden	2021–22 RET
18	6 November 2021	Finland	39	12	FFC Rugby Aréna Tatra Smíchov, Czech Republic	2021–22 RET
19	13 November 2021	Switzerland	27	0	Colovray Sports Centre, Switzerland	2021–22 RET
20	5 November 2022	Germany	10	12	Rugby Center, Hürth	2022–23 RET
21	19 November 2022	Belgium	29	21	Markéta Stadium, Prague	2022–23 RET
22	4 March 2023	Portugal	0	51	CAR Jamor, Oeiras	2022–23 RET
23	18 March 2023	Finland	0	3	Areálu Ondřeje Sekory, Brno	2022–23 RET

=== 2025–26 ===
Test	Date	Opponent	PF	PA	Venue	Event
24	23 November 2025	Austria	7	20	BLZ Atzgersdorf, Vienna	2025–26 REWC
25	1 March 2026	Poland	26	7	Burloch Arena, Ruda Śląska, Poland	Test match

== Other internationals ==
Date	Czechia	PF	PA	Opponent	Venue
8 November 2009	Czech Republic	40	0	Eastern Germany	Tatra Smíchov, Prague
30 March 2016	Czech Republic	17	12	Brown University	Stadion Markéta, Prague
21 October 2017	Czech Republic	17	27	French Army Women	Stadion Markéta, Prague
