= List of Portugal women's national rugby union team matches =

The following is a list of Portugal women's national rugby union team international matches.

== Overall ==
Portugal's overall international match record against all nations, updated to 16 March 2025, is as follows:

	Games Played	Won	Drawn	Lost	Percentage of wins
Total	17	9	0	8	52.94%

== Results ==
=== Full internationals ===
Won	Lost	Draw

=== 1995 ===
Test	Date	Opponent	PF	PA	Venue	Tournament
1	1995-05-14	Germany	0	50	Heidelberg	First test match

=== 2021–26 ===
Test	Date	Opponent	PF	PA	Venue	Tournament
2	2021-12-04	Belgium	10	8	CAR Jamor, Oeiras	2021–22 Rugby Europe Trophy
3	2022-04-30	Germany	57	0	CAR Jamor, Oeiras	2021–22 Rugby Europe Trophy
4	2022-10-22	Belgium	71	5	Nelson Mandela Stadium, Brussels	2022–23 Rugby Europe Trophy
5	2022-11-26	Sweden	5	7	CAR Jamor, Oeiras	
6	2023-02-04	Finland	39	0	CAR Jamor, Oeiras	2022–23 Rugby Europe Trophy
7	2023-03-04	Czech Republic	51	0	CAR Jamor, Oeiras	2022–23 Rugby Europe Trophy
8	2023-04-15	Germany	20	5	Rugby Center, Hürth	2022–23 Rugby Europe Trophy
9	2023-11-21	Brazil	7	10	SESI Guarulhos, São Paulo	
10	2023-11-25	Brazil	13	5	SESI Guarulhos, São Paulo	
11	2024-02-24	Netherlands	7	31	CAR Jamor, Oeiras	2024 REC
12	2024-03-09	Sweden	27	0	CAR Jamor, Oeiras	2024 REC
13	2024-03-30	Spain	0	24	Pins Vens, Sitges	2024 REC
14	2025-03-16	Brazil	12	19	Caldas da Rainha, Leiria	
15	2025-03-29	Spain	7	19	Estádio Municipal do Cartaxo, Cartaxo	2025 REC
16	2025-04-06	Netherlands	5	40	National Rugby Center, Amsterdam	2025 REC
17	2025-04-12	Sweden	38	3	Trelleborg Rugby Arena, Trelleborg	2025 REC
18	2026-03-29	Netherlands	0	59	National Rugby Center, Amsterdam	2026 REC
19	2026-04-11	Spain	TBD	TBD	CAR Jamor, Oeiras	2026 REC
20	2026-04-18	Belgium	TBD	TBD	Sportcomplex Sint-Gillis, Dendermonde	2026 REC

== Other matches ==
Date		PF	PA	Opponent	Venue
5 February 2012	Portugal	16	7	Galicia	Estádio Universitário de Lisboa
