= List of Finland women's national rugby union team matches =

The following is a list of Finland women's national rugby union team matches.

== Overall ==
Finland's overall international match record against all nations is as follows:

	Games Played	Won	Drawn	Lost	Win %
Total	34	7	2	25	20.59%

== Full internationals ==
=== Legend ===
Won	Lost	Draw

=== 2000s ===
Test	Date	Opponent	PF	PA	Venue	Event
1	2007-04-11	Norway	12	12	Boitsfort, Belgium	2007 FIRA
2	2007-04-13	Germany	0	42	Liège, Belgium	2007 FIRA
3	2007-04-15	Luxembourg	14	7	Tervuren, Belgium	2007 FIRA
4	2008-05-19	Romania	5	13	Utrecht, Netherlands	2008 FIRA
5	2008-05-19	Russia	0	39	Utrecht, Netherlands	2008 FIRA
6	2008-05-21	Germany	3	39	Driebergen, Netherlands	2008 FIRA
7	2008-05-23	Romania	5	12	Amsterdam	2008 FIRA
8	2009-10-24	Norway	22	5	Oslo	

=== 2010s ===
Test	Date	Opponent	PF	PA	Venue	Event
9	2011-04-30	Spain	0	119	University of Coruña	2011 FIRA
10	2011-04-02	Sweden	0	20	A Malata Ferrol	2011 FIRA
11	2011-04-07	Russia	5	22	INEF Bastiagueiro	2011 FIRA
12	2012-05-03	Netherlands	0	105	Enkoping, Sweden	2012 FIRA
13	2012-05-07	Russia	17	45	Enkoping, Sweden	2012 FIRA
14	2012-10-06	Switzerland	5	15	Myllypuro Park, Finland	
15	2014-03-08	Switzerland	0	80	Unterägeri, Switzerland	
16	2017-10-21	Sweden	10	39	Eerikkilä Areena, Finland	
17	2018-10-13	Switzerland	5	20	Helsinki, Finland	2018–19 RET
18	2019-03-16	Czech Republic	0	15	Tatra Smichov, Prague, Czech Republic	2018–19 RET
19	2019-10-12	Czech Republic	5	5	Myllypuro Urheilupuisto, Helsinki, Finland	2019–20 RET
20	2019-11-02	Sweden	7	19	Malmö, Sweden	2019–20 RET
21	2019-11-23	Switzerland	0	32	Yverdon, Switzerland	2019–20 RET

=== 2020s ===
Test	Date	Opponent	PF	PA	Venue	Event
22	2021-10-16	Sweden	10	24	Myllypuro Urheilupuisto, Helsinki, Finland	2021–22 RET
23	2021-11-06	Czech Republic	12	39	Tatra Smichov, Prague, Czech Republic	2021–22 RET
24	2022-05-28	Switzerland	80	0	Hamarin Sports Ground, Porvoo, Finland	2021–22 RET
25	2022-10-22	Germany	43	5	Myllypuron Nurmikenttä, Helsinki, Finland	2022–23 RET
26	2023-02-04	Portugal	0	39	CAR Jamor, Oeiras	2022–23 RET
27	2023-03-18	Czech Republic	3	0	Brno Bystrc, Brno, Czech Republic	2022–23 RET
28	2023-10-21	Latvia	41	7	Myllypuron Nurmikenttä, Helsinki, Finland	Test match
29	2024-10-19	Germany	10	44	Hakunila Sports Park, Vantaa, Finland	2024–25 RET
30	2024-10-26	Latvia	63	0	Zemgale Olympic Center, Jelgava, Latvia	Test match
31	2025-04-05	Belgium	13	44	ASUB, Waterloo, Belgium	2024–25 RET
32	2025-10-25	Sweden	7	18	Ruutisavu Areena, Vantaa, Finland	2025–26 RET
33	2026-02-28	Germany	0	68	Fritz-Grunebaum-Sportpark, Heidelberg	2025–26 RET
34	2026-10-24	Germany	12	85	Ruutisavu Areena, Vantaa, Finland	2026–27 RET

== Other matches ==
Date	Finland	F	A	Opponent	Venue	Event
12 April 2007	Finland	15	42	(France) French Universities	Frameries, Belgium	2007 FIRA Championship
21 May 2008	Finland	0	29	France Defence	Driebergen, Netherlands	2008 FIRA Championship
22 May 2009	Finland	19	16	Sweden A	Södertälje	
4 May 2011	Finland	3	109	France A	INEF Bastiaqueiro	2011 FIRA European Trophy
10 February 2013	Finland	7	17	Scotland U20	Scotland	
12 October 2013	Finland	24	10	(Finland) Finnish Barbarians	Paavo Nurmen Stadion, Turku, Finland	
31 May 2014	Finland	0	63	French Defense	Paavo Nurmen Stadion, Turku, Finland	
18 October 2025	Finland	66	0	(Finland) Finnish Barbarians	Ruutisavu Areena, Vantaa	
