= 2009–10 KB První Liga season =

The 2009–10 KB První Liga competition was a Czech domestic rugby club competition operated by the Česká Rugbyová Unie (ČSRU). It began on September 13, 2009, with a match between Přelouč and Slovan Bratislava at the Rugbyové hřiště PARKHEM in Přelouč, and continued through to the final round of matches on June 6, 2010 (there was no final).

Havířov and Přelouč were relegated from the KB Extraliga at the end of the 2008 season, while Bystrc and Zlín were promoted to the same.

Havířov were declared winners and promoted to the KB Extraliga for the next season, after finishing in top spot on the log. Second-placed Olomouc were also promoted, having won the promotion playoffs against Bystrc.

== Competition format ==
Each club played every other club twice, with matches being played over fourteen rounds.

== The teams ==
Location of teams in the KB První Liga 2009-10
Location of teams in the KB První Liga 2009-10

Team	Captain	Head coach	Stadium	Capacity
ARC Iuridica	(Czech Republic) Ondřej Malina	(Czech Republic) Michal Ouředník	?	?
Havířov	(Czech Republic) Pavel Kozubík	(Czech Republic) Pavel Lištvan	?	?
Olomouc	?	(Czech Republic) Tomáš Förster	?	?
Praga B	?	(Czech Republic) Petr Křištan and (Czech Republic) Miroslav Fuchs (player-coach)	?	?
Přelouč	(Czech Republic) Petr Musil	(Czech Republic) Martin Kohout	Rugbyové hřiště PARKHEM	?
Slavia Prague B	?	(Czech Republic) Pavel Mejstřík	Ragbyove hřiště v Edenu	?
Slovan Bratislava	?	(South Africa) Neil Mentz	Stadion Slovnaft	500
Sokol Mariánské Hory	?	(Czech Republic) Karel Ševčík (player-coach)	?	?

== Table ==
2009–10 Top 14 Table
	Club	Played	Won	Drawn	Lost	Points for	Points against	Points
1	Havířov	14	12	0	2	596	172	57
2	Olomouc	14	11	0	3	602	181	55
3	Praga B	14	9	0	5	406	333	46
4	Sokol Mariánské Hory	14	9	0	5	383	273	43
5	Přelouč	14	8	0	6	465	280	40
6	Slavia Prague B	14	3	1	10	238	624	16
7	ARC Iuridica	14	1	1	12	150	55	11
8	Slovan Bratislava	14	1	0	13	207	685	6

== Schedule and results ==
From the official ČSRU site. Within each weekend, matches are to be listed in the following order:

1. By date.
2. If matches are held on the same day, by kickoff time.
3. Otherwise, in alphabetic order of home club.

=== Rounds 1 to 5 ===
Round 1

- 13 September, 14:00 — Havířov 36 - 39 Praga B
- 13 September, 14:00 — Sokol Mariánské Hory 30 - 0 Slavia Prague B
- 13 September, 14:00 — Přelouč 65 - 13 Slovan Bratislava
- 13 September, 16:00 — Olomouc 56 - 0 ARC Iuridica

Round 2

- 19 September, 13:30 — Praga B 12 - 34 Olomouc
- 20 September, 14:00 — Přelouč 11 - 23 Havířov
- 20 September, 14:00 — Slovan Bratislava 16 - 31 Slavia Prague B
- 1 November, 13:00 — ARC Iuridica 14 - 21 Sokol Mariánské Hory

Round 3

- 26 September, 14:00 — Havířov 76 - 15 Slovan Bratislava
- 27 September, 14:00 — Olomouc 24 - 28 Přelouč
- 27 September, 14:30 — Sokol Mariánské Hory 34 - 32 Praga B
- 28 September, 17:00 — Slavia Prague B 58 - 19 ARC Iuridica

Round 4

- 3 October, 14:00 — Havířov 21 - 0 Olomouc
- 3 October, 14:00 — Slovan Bratislava 32 - 26 ARC Iuridica
- 4 October, 17:00 — Praga B 26 - 7 Slavia Prague B
- 31 October, 14:00 — Přelouč 27 - 20 Sokol Mariánské Hory

Round 5

- 10 October, 11:00 — Sokol Mariánské Hory 7 - 24 Havířov
- 11 October, 15:00 — ARC Iuridica 15 - 28 Praga B
- 11 October, 16:00 — Olomouc 81 - 7 Slovan Bratislava
- 11 October, 16:00 — Slavia Prague B 17 - 35 Přelouč

=== Rounds 6 to 10 ===
Round 6

- 18 October, 14:00 — Havířov 97 - 0 Slavia Prague B
- 18 October, 14:00 — Olomouc 39 - 3 Sokol Mariánské Hory
- 18 October, 14:00 — Slovan Bratislava 3 - 7 Praga B
- 18 October, 15:30 — Přelouč 82 - 3 ARC Iuridica

Round 7

- 25 October, 12:00 — Slavia Prague B 10 - 61 Olomouc
- 25 October, 15:30 — Praga B 21 - 0 Přelouč
- 25 October, — ARC Iuridica 0 - 48 Havířov
- 25 October, — Sokol Mariánské Hory 54 - 12 Slovan Bratislava

Round 8

- 3 April, 10:30 — Praga B 12 - 31 Havířov
- 4 April, — ARC Iuridica - Olomouc
- 4 April, — Slavia Prague B - Sokol Mariánské Hory
- 4 April, 14:00 — Slovan Bratislava 13 - 27 Přelouč

Round 9

- 11 April, 13:00 — Havířov 54 - 20 Přelouč
- 11 April, 13:30 — Olomouc 41 - 36 Praga B
- 11 April, 14:00 — Sokol Mariánské Hory 46 - 3 ARC Iuridica
- 11 April, 15:00 — Slavia Prague B 36 - 15 Slovan Bratislava

Round 10

- 18 April, 13:00 — Slovan Bratislava 12 - 55 Havířov
- 18 April, 14:00 — Přelouč 14 - 17 Olomouc
- 18 April, 14:30 — Praga B 7 - 56 Sokol Mariánské Hory
- 18 April, 16:00 — ARC Iuridica 17 - 17 Slavia Prague B

=== Rounds 11 to 14 ===
Round 11

- 2 May, — ARC Iuridica 27 - 13 Slovan Bratislava
- 2 May, — Olomouc 20 - 13 Havířov
- 2 May, — Slavia Prague B 17 - 38 Praga B
- 2 May, — Sokol Mariánské Hory 12 - 6 Přelouč

Round 12

- 9 May, — Havířov 35 - 7 Sokol Mariánské Hory
- 9 May, 16:00 — Praga B 26 - 23 ARC Iuridica
- 9 May, — Přelouč 93 - 14 Slavia Prague B
- 9 May, — Slovan Bratislava 20 - 68 Olomouc

Round 13

- 30 May, 14:00 — Sokol Mariánské Hory 0 - 43 Olomouc
- 30 May, 14:00 — Slavia Prague B 19 - 67 Havířov
- 30 May, 15:00 — Praga B 76 - 17 Slovan Bratislava
- 30 May, 15:30 — ARC Iuridica 3 - 38 Přelouč

Round 14

- 6 June, 14:00 — Havířov 30 - 0 ARC Iuridica
- 6 June, 14:00 — Olomouc 76 - 0 Slavia Prague B
- 6 June, 14:00 — Slovan Bratislava 17 - 59 Sokol Mariánské Hory
- 6 June, 17:00 — Přelouč 19 - 46 Praga B
