= Finland national rugby union team =

National rugby union team

Finland
- Union: Suomen Rugbyliitto
- Head coach: Alastair Davies
- Captain: Jussi Viljanen
First colours	Second colours

World Rugby ranking
- Current: 77 (as of 10 July 2026)
- Highest: 71 (2023)
- Lowest: 82 (2022)

First international
- Finland 0 – 60 Switzerland (1982-05-22)

Biggest win
- Finland 120 – 5 Estonia (2025-05-10)

Biggest defeat
- Denmark 100 – 0 Finland (1987-10-10)

The Finland national rugby union team represents Finland in men's international rugby union. The national side are ranked 71st in the world, as of 24 April 2023.

== History ==
Finland played their first ever rugby international in 1982 against Switzerland, which they lost. Finland went on to win their first international in 1991, defeating Norway 18 points to 3

They played Monaco in 2002. Finland's attempt to qualify for the 2007 Rugby World Cup in France began in Round 1 of the European tournaments. They faced Bulgaria in a two match series as part of the Round 1 group to determine which nation would advance. Bulgaria won the first game 42 points to 3 in Helsinki and won the second leg 50 to 3 in Sofia to knock Finland out of the tournament.

== Record ==
Below is a summary table of Finland’s national XV rugby test matches through 10 October 2026, updated after match with Estonia.

Against	Played	Won	Lost	Drawn	Win percentage
Andorra	1	1	0	0	100%
Austria	1	1	0	0	100%
Bosnia and Herzegovina	6	2	3	1	33.33%
Bulgaria	9	1	8	0	11.11%
Cyprus	2	0	2	0	0%
Denmark	10	3	7	0	30%
Estonia	7	7	0	0	100%
Gibraltar	4	1	3	0	25%
Greece	8	5	3	0	62.5%
Hungary	1	0	1	0	0%
Israel	5	1	4	0	20%
Latvia	4	1	2	1	25%
Luxembourg	10	1	9	0	10%
Moldova	1	1	0	0	100%
Monaco	1	0	1	0	0%
Norway	20	9	11	0	45%
Slovenia	2	0	2	0	0%
Sweden	2	0	2	0	0%
Switzerland	1	0	1	0	0%
Turkey	2	1	1	0	50%
Total	97	35	60	2	36.08%

== Current squad ==
Current line-up for the 2023-24 Rugby Europe Conference.

- Coach: Alastair Davies

Note: Flags indicate national union for the club/province as defined by World Rugby.

Player	Position	Date of birth (age)	Caps	Club/province
Tapio Lahtinen	Prop		6	(Finland) Jyväskylä R.F.C.
Ossi Aro	Hooker		19	(Finland) Tampere R.F.C.
Chris Denholm	Prop		21	(Finland) Helsinki RC
Akseli Peltoniemi	Lock		14	(Finland) Old Town Shamrocks
Aaro Katainen	Lock		30	(Finland) Jyväskylä R.F.C.
Kosti Eskola	Flanker		16	(Finland) Warriors RC
Matti Keränen	Flanker		30	(Finland) Old Town Shamrocks
John Poole	Number 8		4	(Finland) Saimaa Sharks/Helsinki RC
Saxby Young	Scrum-half		5	(Finland) Helsinki RC
Thomas Finell	Fly-half		64	(Finland) Warriors RC
Samu-Petteri Pääkkö	Wing		20	(Finland) Old Town Shamrocks
Jussi Viljanen (c)	Centre		32	(Finland) Tampere R.F.C.
Kim Ali-keskikylä	Centre			(Finland) Turku Eagles
Antti Haapanen	Wing		0	(Finland) Helsinki RC
Philip Sleath	Fullback		9	(Finland) Turku Eagles
Paulo Pannuzzo	Hooker		0	(Finland) Helsinki RC
Olli Räsänen	Prop			(Finland) Jyväskylä R.F.C./Tampere R.F.C.
Olli Palosuo	Prop		0	(Finland) Helsinki RC
Juho Kiljain	Lock		3	(Finland) Jyväskylä R.F.C.
Jedidiah Patton	Back row		1	(Finland) Turku Eagles
James Edwards	Fly-half		0	(Finland) Tampere R.F.C.
Timo McIntyre	Wing		0	(Finland) Tampere R.F.C.
Jack Crabtree	Fullback		1	(Finland) Warriors RC
