= Helsinki RC =

Helsinki Rugby Club
- Full name: Helsinki Rugby Football Club
- Union: Finnish Rugby Federation
- Founded: 1999
- Location: Helsinki, Finland
- Ground: Myllypuron Liikuntapuisto
- Chairman: Mathieu Nicodeme
- League: Finnish Championship League
1st kit	2nd kit

Official website
- helsinkirugby.fi/en/

Helsinki Rugby Club (colloquially known as HRC) is a Finnish rugby club based in Helsinki. Founded in 1999, it is the oldest and biggest (in terms of registered players) club in Finland. They currently play in the Finnish Championship League, competing with both men and women teams in XV's and 7's.

== Teams, club logo and colors ==
HRC comprises three different teams: two men's teams, one in the Championship and one in the Division 2, and one women's team, playing in the Championship.

Since 2021, HRC has also launched a youth programme and started the U17 beginners' team, to develop future rugby players and help contributing to the growth of the rugby movement in Finland.

The club logo shows the nationalities involved in the formation of the club: Finnish, English, French, South African and Australian. The club colors, blue and white, are taken from the finnish flag.

== Early history (1999–2019) ==
The inspiration to form Helsinki Rugby Club came during some rugby discussions in Molly Malone’s Irish Bar in Helsinki between some rugby friends in 1999. In its first season HRC played one game, narrowly lost to a representative team from Sweden. In 2000, the club was granted its first official home ground in Myllypuro by the Helsinki City Council. HRC claimed its first victory against a team representing British Navy ship HMS Sheffield, took part in the Stockholm 10's Tournament for the first time and organized the first edition of the Baltic Plate 10-a-side Tournament.

The Finnish National Championship was launched in 2002 and HRC claimed the title, followed by another championship win in 2003.

The club's first ever tour abroad was in Riga in 2004. In the same year, Finland played its first home international game, which was hosted and organized by HRC. HRC participated to the inaugural Women’s Finnish Championship, launched in 2006. In 2008, Baltic Plate Tournament was transformed into Midnight Rugby Tournament and took its position as an annual mid-June rugby party in Helsinki, until its last edition in 2019. In 2009, the club celebrated its 10-year anniversary in the British Embassy.

The inaugural men’s 7’s championship was launched in 2010 and HRC took the first ever title. In 2011, men’s 7’s team was invited to Moscow for European 7’s Champions Trophy.

After a few years of absence, HRC re-enter the women’s championship in 2012.

In 2013, the club organized the Finnish Championship finals in Helsinki, attracting the (then) highest-ever amount of spectators at a Finnish rugby game.

After an eleven-year drought, men claimed the XV’s championship in 2014. At the same time, the women's team advanced to the finals first time in their history, finishing in the runner-up position. A year later, in 2015, the tables turned as HRC women's team celebrated their first ever XV’s title, while men narrowly lost the title in the final. Men’s 7’s team won the 7’s championship title and HRC men’s 2nd team won the Division 1.

The 2016 season is HRC’s shiniest moment: the club accomplished its first and only double-double, as both men and women retrieved both the 7’s and XV’s championships. Men’s 7’s team participated again to European 7’s Champions Trophy in Saint Petersburg, Russia.

In 2017, both men and women reclaimed the 7’s titles and finished in the runner-up position in their respective championships. The club also participated in traditional Ghent Easter 7’s tournament and finished in men and women’s competitions second and third, respectively.

== Recent years (since 2020) ==
=== XVs ===
==== 2020 Season ====
Despite the COVID-19 pandemic, HRC had a particularly successful season in 2020, achieving a solid roster depth for both Big Guns and Blue Tigers. The short schedule saw the Big Guns, led by returning coach Jake Pratley, go undefeated throughout the regular season: after a draw with OTS Porvoo for 24–24 in the season opener, HRC went on to defeat Jyväskylä (59–10), Turku Eagles (17–14), Kuopio (79–0), Warriors (27–14) and Kalev (47–0). In the championship final, held in Otaniemi, HRC defeated Warriors for 40–29, winning their fifth national title. HRC number eight Wertti Bask also won the Player of the Year award.

The second team, under first-time coach Jussi Tamminen, had a positive year, tying with Pori at the top of the division at the end of the regular season. In the Division 1 final matchup, Pori defeated HRC for 23–5.

HRC women's team started the 2020 season under coach Mikko Aalto seeking to defend their 2019 title, but after an opening win against Jyväskylä (7–12) they suffered losses against title contenders Tampere (5-46) and Turku Swans (10–24). HRC reached the third place in the regular season thanks to following wins against Warriors (7-31) and Kuopio (26–0), but the run for the title stopped in the semifinal against Turku Swans (7–13).

==== 2021 Season ====
In 2021, the rugby season was once again threatened by the harsh restrictions that were in place in Finland in the first part of the year, which prevented the club members from training until just nine weeks before the beginning of the (once again shortened) season. As a partial consequence, all three teams suffered a shortage of roster depth which only aggravated as the season progressed and injuries occurred.

Despite strong wins against Porvoo (45–8), Kuopio (111–0) and Turku (38–14), Big Guns lost the city derby against Warriors (7-27) and had to go through semifinals for a shot at the title. After coming out victorious in a fought match against Porvoo (20–10), Big Guns retained their sixth championship win in a nervewrecking final in Tampere against Warriors, after a late penalty kick from Joonas Bask sealed the score 15-12 for HRC. Also, Jake Pratley won the Coach of the Year award.

The second team could not repeat the positive year they had in 2020, concluding the regular season in Division 1 last place and being relegated to Division 2 for the next season.

HRC women's team entered the 2021 season as a strong title contender, defeating Jyväskylä (36–0), Warriors (50–0) and Turku Swans (32–5) and showing to be able to compete against reigning champions Tampere (5–10). Despite a large win in the semifinal against Turku Swans (41–10), HRC came up short in the fight for the title due to a heartbreaking loss in the final rematch against Tampere (7–18). HRC utility back Heidi Hennessy won the Player of the Year award.

==== 2022 Season ====
The 2022 XVs season featured the return of a full schedule after two years of pandemic, and started with a big structural change for HRC: Jake Pratley was named Director of Rugby, with the goal of starting a new cycle for all three club teams.

Similarly to other teams, HRC struggled in the offseason, as the cold temperature that lasted until late May prevented the use of the home training field in Myllypuro. However, the regular season proved successful for HRC, as both men and women's teams concluded in first place and qualified directly for the Championship Final in Turku. Men went on to defeat Warriors (45–15) and retrieve their 7th national title. HRC women's team ended the championship drought, emerging on top in the final against Tampere (37–17). This marked the second time the Club achieved a double (the first since 2016) and the longest winning streak for the Men's team.

Jake Pratley was named Coach of the Year and Sanna-Kaisa Lintu won the Player of the Year award. Mikko Moilanen reached his 100th XVs cap with HRC.

HRC Men

Regular season	Round 1	Round 2
HRC v Turku Eagles	53–24	44–27
HRC v Kuopio	50–8	48–19
HRC v Warriors	44–7	55–19
HRC v Jyväskylä	64–14	114–0
HRC v OTS Porvoo	64–7	12–17

Championship Final	Final Score
HRC v Warriors	45–15

HRC Women

Regular season	Round 1	Round 2
HRC v Turku Swans	0-70^{†}	89–10
HRC v WaLi	31–7	48–11
HRC v Tampere	31–15	20–5
HRC v Jyväskylä	52–0	41–24

^{†} = Game Forfeited

Championship Final	Final Score
HRC v Tampere	37–17

HRC Men 2nd

Regular season	Round 1	Round 2
HRC v Seinäjoki	26–36	0-70^{†}
HRC v Warriors 2	36–19	36–31
HRC v TRA	5-37	0-70^{†}
HRC v Linna	38–14	27–38

^{†} = Game Forfeited

==== 2023 Season ====
In 2023, the 7s coaching team followed into the 15s after Jake Pratley's departure: Mikko Moilanen was named Head Coach of the men's teams, while Leonardo Fierro took over the role for the women's team. The club looked at 2023 as a rebuild year.

After a rocky start and facing the risk of being out of the playoffs, the men's team turned the season around with some late wins that solidified the final third spot in the Championship, hence qualifying for the semifinal. However, the Big Guns' journey ended there with a tough loss against Turku Eagles (3-50). The Blue Tigers had a positive season and won the Division 2.

The women's team collaborated with Saimaa Sharks in the Championship and WaLi (Warriors-Linna) in Division 1 to extend gametime for players wanting to develop. The season start was challenging due to low numbers, which also led the team to forfeit a game against Turku Swans due to the overlap with the Rugby Europe 7s Trophy season. The team fought its way through the regular season and came out on top of the table by one point over Tampere. HRCW then faced WaLi in the Final and retained the Championship with a sounding victory (38–0).

HRC Men

Regular season	Round 1	Round 2
HRC v Warriors	10–38	0-33
HRC v Turku Eagles	12–39	19–7
HRC v Tampere	31–20	33–0
HRC v OTS Porvoo	25–26	35–17

Semifinal	Final Score
HRC v Turku Eagles	3-50

HRC Women

Regular season	Round 1	Round 2
HRC v WaLi	29–20	19–7
HRC v Turku Swans	0-24^{†}	54–12
HRC v Tampere	5-41	17–10
HRC v Jyväskylä	52–5	24-0^{†}

^{†} = Game Forfeited

Championship Final	Final Score
HRC v WaLi	38–0

HRC Men 2nd

Regular season	Round 1	Round 2
HRC v Warriors	24-0^{†}	54–15
HRC v Espoo	12–7	10–17

^{†} = Game Forfeited

Division 2 Final	Final Score	
HRC v Pori	24–30	24-0^{†}

Fuusio HRC-WaLi

Regular season	Round 1	Round 2
Fuusio v Saimaa Sharks	7–5	5–12
Fuusio v Joensuu	27–0	24–0
Fuusio v Oulu	0-24^{†}	0-24^{†}
Fuusio v Kuopio	24-0^{†}	24-0^{†}

^{†} = Game Forfeited

==== 2024 Season ====
After a troubled start, the men's team reached the semifinal after a late resurgence in the regular season with some key wins against Turku and Kalev. A fought semifinal against OTS Porvoo saw the latter prevail, and the Big Guns missed another championship final.

The women's team finished second in the standings and won the playoff semifinal to face again Tampere in the winner-take-all final in Espoo. Tampere took the lead in the first half, but two consecutive yellow cards opened the way for a HRC comeback and an all-time-high 6th championship win. HRC was the first women's team in Finland to win three consecutive national titles.

HRC Men

Regular season	Round 1	Round 2
HRC v OTS Porvoo	12-26	10-28
HRC v Kalev	18-27	46-10
HRC v Tampere	30-26	36-21
HRC v Warriors	5-22	12-33
HRC v Turku Eagles	67-29	34-5

Semifinal	Final Score
HRC v OTS Porvoo	17-21

HRC Women

Regular season	Round 1	Round 2
HRC v WaLi	44-7	17-7
HRC v Jyväskylä	75-5	27-12
HRC v Karjala Sharks	34-19	64-7
HRC v Tampere	7-29	24-15
HRC v Turku Swans	46-5	64-15

Semifinal	Final Score
HRC v WaLi	24-14
Championship Final	Final Score
HRC v Tampere	27-14

HRC Men 2nd

Regular season	Round 1	Round 2
HRC v Warriors	76-12	10-33
HRC v PHT	5-61	0-64

==== 2025 Season ====
In 2025, the men's team returned to the championship final for the first time since 2022 to face Warriors, but proved no match for the returning champions. The women's team finished second in the regular season standings but had to forfeit the semifinals in favor of Jyväskylä due to a lack of available players, combination of injuries and overlap of the 2025 Women's Rugby World Cup.

HRC Men

Regular season	Round 1	Round 2
HRC v Tampere	53-7	31-19
HRC v Turku Eagles	29-17	24-15
HRC v Kalev	20-14	12-21
HRC v Warriors	3-24	28-24
HRC v OTS Porvoo	50-0	12-38

Semifinal	Final Score
HRC v Turku Eagles	22-17
Championship final	Final Score
HRC v Warriors	22-17

HRC Women

Regular season	Round 1	Round 2
HRC v Tampere	19-46	14-47
HRC v Turku Swans	63-7	57-0
HRC v Jyväskylä	14-7	12-15
HRC v WaLi	34-21	36-14

Semifinal	Final Score
HRC v Jyväskylä	0-24^{†}

^{†} = Game Forfeited

HRC Men 2nd

Regular season	Round 1	Round 2
HRC v PHT	37-22	17-29
HRC v Warriors	5-41	27-35
HRC v Kalev	7-64	17-26

Fuusio HRC-WaLi

Regular season	Round 1	Round 2
Fuusio v Potku	51-20	29-10
Fuusio v Kiuru	87-5	35-12
Fuusio v Karjala Sharks	24-0^{†}	0-69

^{†} = Game Forfeited

=== Sevens ===
==== 2020-2021 Seasons ====
In 2020 and 2021, the Finnish 7's championship was not held due to the COVID-19 restrictions over sports in Finland.

==== 2022 Season ====
After two years of stop, the 7s series was finally brought back in 2022, with both men and women's teams entering as reigning champions after their respective victories in 2019. Mikko Moilanen returned as men's coach, while Leonardo Fierro took over as women's coach.

HRC men finished the series topping the East pool, with wins in Lahti 7s and Järvenpää 7s and a second place in Myyrmäki 7s. In the final tournament, HRC faced Turku Eagles (winner of the West pool) and Tampere (winner of the North pool), concluding as a runner-up behind Turku. The second team ended in second place in the West pool and did not qualify for the finals.

HRC women saw bad luck affecting their season, as injuries and a Covid outbreak forced them out of two of the four tournaments in the series. The team scored a second place in Valkeakoski 7s and Tampere 7s, but did not participate in Järvenpää and Eerikkilä. HRC took the third place overall in the series, which saw Tampere taking the trophy home and Warriors concluding as runner up.

==== 2023 Season ====
The 2023 Sevens championship was unfortunately affected by the long finnish winter, which caused the last tournament of the series in Valkeakoski to be cancelled after only two rounds for the Men and one for the women. HRC men scored two second places in Lahti and Järvenpää, losing in the tournament finals against respectively Saimaa Sharks and the Finnish National Team representative. HRC women ended as runner up in Järvenpää, where Tampere won a tight final 14–17.

As a result, both teams scored a second place in the total series.

==== 2024 Season ====
In 2024, HRC presented only a MiniGuns team for the 7s Championship. The team finished in third place in Järvenpää 7s, but withdrew from Valkeakoski 7s due to unsafe weather conditions. After the Oulu 7s got cancelled, the final stands saw HRC in 6th place.

HRCW had a successful 7s campaign, winning the Tallinn 7s and Valkeakoski 7s, and ending as runner-up in Oulu 7s, with all three tournament finals played against Tampere Rugby Club. As a result, HRCW won the 7s title after a 5-year draught.

==== 2025 Season ====
In 2025, the MiniGuns team finished in 4th place after three tournaments. HRCW ended the first and second tournament as a runner-up to Tampere, but Tampere was unable to field the team on the last tournament as it overlapped with a national team game. HRCW won the last tournament and as a result retained the championship title.

==== 2026 Season ====
HRC showed a considerably strong performance in the first two tournaments in the series from both MiniGuns and HRCW. Both teams are at the top of their table heading into the last round. The HRC 7s team scored a double national title for the first time since 2019.

== Honours ==
- Finnish Championship League (Rugbyn SM-sarja) XV
  - Men (7): 2002, 2003, 2014, 2016, 2020, 2021, 2022
  - Women (6): 2015, 2016, 2019, 2022, 2023, 2024 (+ 2009, 2011, 2012 as Fuusio WRC-HRC)
- Finnish Championship League (Rugbyn SM-sarja) 7's
  - Men (7): 2010, 2015, 2016, 2017, 2018, 2019, 2026
  - Women (6): 2016, 2017, 2019, 2024, 2025, 2026
- Finnish Rugby Cup
  - Men (2): 2003, 2005

== Notable players and staff ==
=== Team Captains ===
Men

Player	Tenure
(Finland) Janne Lumme	1999–2000
(France) Marc-Olivier Meunier	2010
(Finland) Mikko Moilanen	2011
(Republic of Ireland) Michael Kennedy	2012-2013
(Finland) Marko Sallert	2014
(England) Richard Hennessy (Republic of Ireland) Paul Kernick	2015-2016
(Republic of Ireland) Ronan Rochford	2017
(Finland) Mikko Aalto	2018
(Finland) Paavo Honkanen	2019-2020
(Italy) Leonardo Fierro	2021-2022
(Finland) Jesperi Virtanen	2023
(Finland) Jaakko Juutilainen	2024–Present

Women

Player	Tenure
(Finland) Ulla Tuomainen	2014, 2020–2021
(Finland) Sofia Ukkonen	2016-2018
(Finland) Heidi Hennessy	2019, 2026
(Finland) Mira Saarikoski	2022–2025

=== Coaches ===
Men

Coach	Tenure
(Scotland) Alastair Davies	2014-2017
(United Kingdom) Jake Pratley	2018, 2020–2022
(Finland) Mikko Moilanen	2023
(Finland) Jesperi Virtanen	2024
(Republic of Ireland) Ronan Rochford	2025-Present

Women

Coach	Tenure
(Finland) Mia Niemelä	2015-2016
(Finland) Virpi Sironen	2017-2018
(Australia) Dyllan Hey	2019
(Finland) Mikko Aalto	2020-2021
(United Kingdom) Jake Pratley	2022
(Italy) Leonardo Fierro	2023–2025
(United Kingdom) Jack Beresford	2026-Present

=== Chairperson ===
Person	Tenure
(Finland) Ville Siiskonen	2015-2018
(France) Emmanuel Courbin	2019-2022
(France) Mathieu Nicodeme	2023–Present

=== Centurions ===
Players with at least 100 caps.

Player	Tenure
(Finland) Jarno Warsa-Ritaranta	2002-2021
(Finland) Mikko Moilanen	2002-2023
(Finland) Ulla Tuomainen	2005-Active
(England) (Finland) Chris Denholm	2012-Active
(Finland) Bea Lindell	2006-Active
(Finland) Anton Nevalainen	2010-Active

=== Honorary members ===
In order of induction.

Member
(Finland) Janne Turunen
(England) Peter Eagling
(France) Sebastien Garcia
(Finland) Olli Linnosuo
(England) Jim McLoughlin
(France) Thierry Demoulin
(Finland) Sanni Virtanen
(New Zealand) Tony Brick
(Finland) Tytti Yli-Vikari
(Finland) Torsti Luotonen
(Finland) Mia Niemelä
(Scotland) Alastair Davies
(Tonga) Ofa Loketi
(Finland) Ulla Tuomainen
(Finland) Ville Siskonen
(Finland) Janne Lumme
(France) Emmanuel Courbin
