= 2008 KB První Liga season =

The 2008 KB První Liga Competition was a Czech domestic rugby club competition, operated by the Česká Rugbyová Unie (ČSRU). It began on August 31, 2008 with a match between Olomouc and ARC Iuridica, and ended with the final on 18 October of that year with Bystrc beating Olomouc 31-10.

Unlike most other years, the league was played over the course of only one year.

== Schedule and results ==
From the official ČSRU site. Within each weekend, matches are to be listed in the following order:

1. By date.
2. If matches are held on the same day, by kickoff time.
3. Otherwise, in alphabetic order of home club.

=== Rounds 1 to 5 ===
Round 1

- 31 August, — Olomouc 24 - 0 ARC Iuridica
- 31 August, — Bystrc 58 - 5 Slavia Prague B
- 4 October, — Sokol Mariánské Hory 23 - 10 Zlín

Round 2

- 7 September, — ARC Iuridica 0 - 48 Zlín
- 7 September, — Slavia Prague B 12 - 32 Sokol Mariánské Hory
- 7 September, — Olomouc 8 - 49 Bystrc

Round 3

- 13 September, 14:00 — Sokol Mariánské Hory 0 - 14 Olomouc
- 14 September, 14:00 — Bystrc 30 - 0 ARC Iuridica
- 14 September, 14:00 — Zlín 63 - 5 Slavia Prague B

Round 4

- 20 September, 14:00 — Bystrc 30 - 0 Sokol Mariánské Hory
- 21 September, 16:30 — ARC Iuridica 30 - 0 Slavia Prague B
- 21 September, 17:00 — Olomouc 68 - 0 Zlín

Round 5

- 27 September, 14:00 — Zlín 3 - 17 Bystrc
- 28 September, 14:00 — Sokol Mariánské Hory 85 - 8 ARC Iuridica
- 28 September, 15:00 — Slavia Prague B 12 - 37 Olomouc

=== Semi-finals ===
2008-10-11
14:00

Bystrc	36 – 3	Zlín
Tries: Opravil (2); Pavel Vrána (2); Friedl; Marek; Cons: Opravil; Jan Konečný (2); Pen:	(Report)	Tries: Con: Pen: Kudrna

Sportovní areá Ondreje Sekory, Brno

2008-10-11
16:00

Olomouc	32 – 10	Sokol Mariánské Hory
Tries: Roman Ziegelheim; Poledna; Tomáš Ziegelheim; Hladík; Navrátil; Cons: Kučera (2/5); Pen: Kučera	(Report)	Try: Reeves; Con: Ševčík; Pen: Ševčík

== Match details ==
18 October 2008

Bystrc	31 – 10	Olomouc
Tries: Horáček (2); Fiala; Friedl; Kintr; Cons: Jilčík (3/5); Pen:	(Report 1) (Report 2)	Tries: Beneš; Hladík; Cons: Pen:

Sportovní areá Ondreje Sekory, Brno

BYSTRC:
FB	15	(Czech Republic) Otto Friedl
RW	14	(Czech Republic) Košíček	Substituted off
OC	13	(Czech Republic) Karel Opravil
IC	12	(Czech Republic) Tomáš Kintr
LW	11	(Czech Republic) Martin Lištván
FH	10	(Czech Republic) Pavel Vrána
SH	9	(Czech Republic) Tomáš Čepelák	Substituted off
N8	8	(Czech Republic) Miloslav Fiala	Substituted off
OF	7	(Czech Republic) Igor Jilčík	Substituted off
BF	6	(Czech Republic) Tomáš Pařík
RL	5	(Czech Republic) Jan Votava	Substituted off
LL	4	(Czech Republic) Petr Havlíček	Substituted off
TP	3	(Czech Republic) Martin Horáček	Substituted off
HK	2	(Czech Republic) Jiří Vrána
LP	1	(Czech Republic) Libor Kornia
Replacements:
PR	16	(Czech Republic) Radek Konečný	Substituted in
LK	17	(Czech Republic) Vlastimil Hodaň	Substituted in
LK	18	(Czech Republic) Oldřich Beneš	Substituted in
FL	19	(Czech Republic) Urban	Substituted in
N8	20	(Czech Republic) David Marek	Substituted in
SH	21	(Czech Republic) Martin Hodaň	Substituted in
WG	22	(Italy) Mattia Caldaroni	Substituted in
Coach:
(Czech Republic) Pavel Vrána (player-coach)

OLOMOUC:
FB	15	(Czech Republic) Marcel Mana
RW	14	(Czech Republic) Roman Ziegelheim
OC	13	(Czech Republic) Francisco Barbosa	(substituted off) 1'
IC	12	(Czech Republic) Stanislav Kvapil
LW	11	(Czech Republic) Richard Hladík
FH	10	(Czech Republic) Michal Kučera
SH	9	(Czech Republic) Patrik Poledna	(substituted off) 53'
N8	8	(Czech Republic) František Beneš	(substituted off) 70'
OF	7	(Czech Republic) Tomáš Ziegelheim
BF	6	(Czech Republic) Oldřich Urbánek
RL	5	(Czech Republic) Richard Januš
LL	4	(Czech Republic) Tadeáš Hrčko	(substituted off) 57'
TP	3	(Czech Republic) David Walch	(substituted off) 45'
HK	2	(Czech Republic) Ivoš Dostál	(substituted off) 60'
LP	1	(Czech Republic) Tomáš Kurka
Replacements:
HK	16	(Czech Republic) Majovský	(substituted in) 60'
PR	17	(Czech Republic) Antonín Puverle	(substituted in) 45'
LK	18	(Czech Republic) Otakar Kasal	(substituted in) 57'
N8	19	(Czech Republic) Petr Verbich	(substituted in) 70'
SH	20	(Czech Republic) Jiří Mráz	(substituted in) 53'
CE	21	(Czech Republic) Kapaňa	(substituted in) 1',	(substituted off) 35'
CE	22	(Czech Republic) Daniel Puha	(substituted in) 35'
Coach:
(Czech Republic) Pavel Pala

Touch judges:

Fourth official:
