= Rugby union in Finland =

- Country: Finland
- Governing body: Suomen Rugbyliitto
- National team: Finland
- Nickname: SRL
- First played: 1978
- Registered players: 577
- Clubs: 14

National competitions
- Rugby World Cup; Rugby World Cup Sevens; IRB Sevens World Series; European Nations Cup

Club competitions
- Finnish Championship League

Rugby union in Finland is a minor but growing sport, with both men's and women's 15s teams represented in world rankings and both women's and men's Sevens teams competing internationally.

Finland's Men's 15s team is currently ranked 75th out of 113 by World Rugby.

Finland's Women's 15s team is currently ranked 36th out of 66 by World Rugby.

== Governing body ==
The governing body is the Finnish Rugby Federation (Suomen Rugbyliitto) ((in English):

== History ==
Finland was the last of the major Nordic countries to take up rugby. Both Denmark and Sweden started playing rugby in the 20th century, and more recently Norway in the 1980s and 1990s. Neighbouring Russia and to a lesser extent Estonia started playing in the Soviet Era, during the 1950s and '60s.

Finnish rugby started to grow during the 1990s and the early 21st century. There are now 692 players registered with the SRL.

In 2000, Helsinki RFC made Finnish rugby history when they beat a team from HMS Sheffield, a vessel in the British Royal Navy

== Teams ==
Currently Finland fields four national teams: men's 15s and 7s and women's 15s and 7s.

== Domestic competition ==
A competition exists in Finland where climatic conditions dictate the main 15-a-side season be played during the northern summer. Women play 7s on artificial grass from January to May.

== See also ==
- Finland national rugby union team
- Finland women's national rugby union team (sevens)
- Finland women's national rugby union team
