= Rugby union in Estonia =

- Country: Estonia
- Governing body: Estonian Rugby Federation
- National team: Estonia
- First played: Mid 20th Century

National competitions
- Rugby World Cup; Rugby World Cup Sevens; IRB Sevens World Series

Rugby union in Estonia is a minor but growing sport.

The national body is the Estonian Rugby Union (Eesti Ragbi Liit). The Estonian Rugby Federation was the original rugby body, but did not affiliate to the IRB, as it was a "federation" of one team, instead of the required three. It was in fact expelled from FIRA-AER for lack of rugby development.

== History ==
Rugby in the Baltic region was mainly introduced during the interwar period, although the game was played in Imperial Russia, including Saint Petersburg pre-Russian revolution, and was introduced to Germany in the 19th century.

=== Soviet period ===
In 1940, the Baltic states were occupied by the Soviet Union. In 1949, rugby union was forbidden in the USSR during the "fight against the cosmopolitanism". The competitions were resumed in 1957, and the Soviet Championship in 1966. In 1975 the Soviet national team played their first match.

Estonia had its own rugby team in the USSR, but it was not treated as a proper national side.

=== Post restoration of independence ===
Stadium used by the national team has been the Viimsi Stadium on loan from NordWest Kinnisvara OÜ.

For a number of years, the Estonian Rugby Federation controlled the game in a federation of one, the "Tigers" based in Tallinn.

Rugby league in Estonia has attempted to make aggressive inroads since the mid-2000s, and took over the one team rugby federation. As a result, 70% of Tallinn's players left, and set up their own rugby union team, the Sharks.

Tallinn hosts to a fair number of touring sides. Currently, one of the most prominent sides is Tallinna Kalev RFC, which play in the Finnish Championship League I division.

Like other places in the region, the playing season is April to October, as pitches are frequently frozen in winter.

== See also ==
- Estonia national rugby union team
- Estonian Rugby Union
