= Ifeoma Kulmala =

Finnish association football referee

Ifeoma Kulmala (born 10 August 1988 in Helsinki) is a Finnish football referee. She has been a FIFA referee since 2014. Football Association of Finland awarded Kulmala as the Referee of the Year in 2017.

Kulmala is a former sprinter and rugby union player. In 2008, competing for the Helsinki athletics club Helsingin Kisa-Veikot, she won the Finnish Championship in the 4 × 400 metres relay. Kulmala has played for Helsinki Rugby Club and the Finland women's national rugby union team.
