= Finnish Championship League =

- Current season or competition: 2026 Finnish Championship League
- Sport: Rugby union
- Instituted: 2002
- Number of teams: 5
- Country: Finland
- Holders: Men: Warriors RC; Women: Tampere RC (2026)
- Most titles: Men: Warriors RC (12); Women: Helsinki RC (6)
- Website: finland.rugby
- Relegation to: Division 1

Finnish Championship League (Rugbyn SM-sarja) is the premier rugby union competition in Finland, formed in 2002. The league is governed by the Finnish Rugby Federation, the governing body for Rugby union in Finland. The league is played in summer months. Previously teams based in Estonia have also participated in the league including Kalev RC from Tallinn.

== Clubs in 2026 ==
=== Men's Championship ===
- Helsinki RC, Helsinki
- Warriors RC, Helsinki
- Eagles RFC, Turku
- Old Town Shamrocks, Porvoo
- Jyväskylä RC, Jyväskylä

=== Women's Championship ===
- Swans RFC, Turku
- Helsinki RC, Helsinki
- Tampere RC, Tampere
- Jyväskylä RC, Jyväskylä
- Warriors RC, Helsinki

=== Men's Division 1 ===
- Oulu RC, Oulu
- Tampere RC, Tampere
- Helsinki RC 2, Helsinki
- Espoo RC, Espoo
- Warriors RC 2, Helsinki

=== Women's Division 1 ===
- Fuusio (WRC-HRC), Helsinki
- Kiuru RC, Kiuruvesi
- Potku (Pori-Tampere-Oulu-Kuopio)

== Champions ==
Year	Men	Women
2002	Helsinki RUFC	-
2003	Helsinki RUFC (2)	-
2004	Jyväskylä RC	-
2005	Jyväskylä RC (2)	-
2006	Tampere RC	-
2007	Tampere RC (2)	-
2008	Warriors RC	-
2009	Warriors RC (2)	Fuusio WRC-HRC
2010	Warriors RC (3)	Jyväskylä RC
2011	Warriors RC (4)	Fuusio WRC-HRC (2)
2012	Warriors RC (5)	Fuusio WRC-HRC (3)
2013	Tampere RC (3)	Jyväskylä RC (2)
2014	Helsinki RUFC (3)	Warriors RC
2015	Warriors RC (6)	Helsinki RUFC
2016	Helsinki RUFC (4)	Helsinki RUFC (2)
2017	Jyväskylä RC (3)	Tampere RC
2018	Warriors RC (7)	Jyväskylä RC (3)
2019	Warriors RC (8)	Helsinki RUFC (3)
2020	Helsinki RUFC (5)	Tampere RC (2)
2021	Helsinki RUFC (6)	Tampere RC (3)
2022	Helsinki RUFC (7)	Helsinki RUFC (4)
2023	Warriors RC (9)	Helsinki RUFC (5)
2024	Warriors RC (10)	Helsinki RUFC (6)
2025	Warriors RC (11)	Tampere RC (4)
2026	Warriors RC (12)	Tampere RC (5)

== See also ==
- Rugby union in Finland
