= Viimsi Stadium (1975) =

Former stadium in Viimsi, Estonia

Coordinates: 59°30′23.73″N 24°49′40.98″E

Viimsi staadion
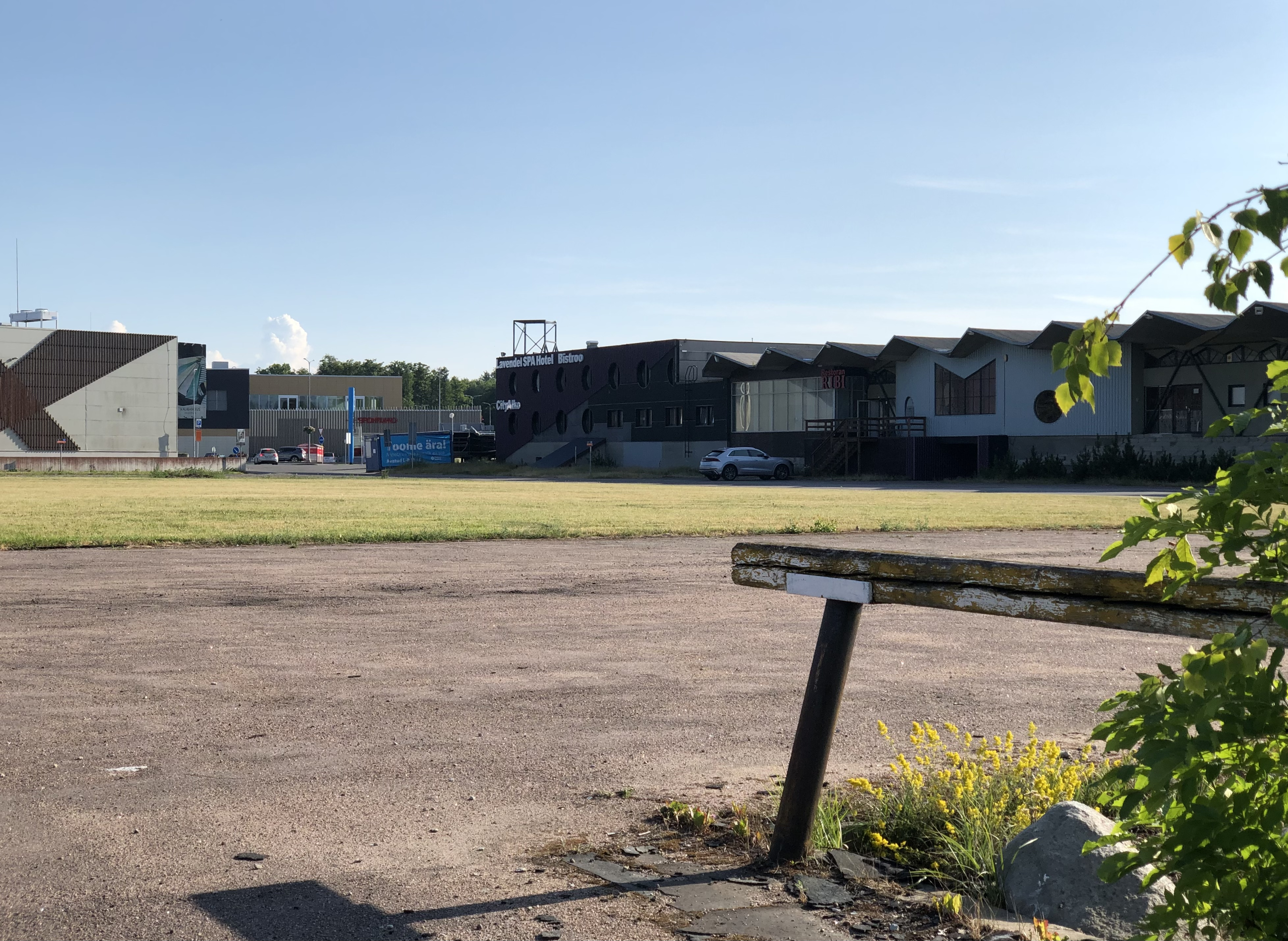
- The former stadium in 2023
- Interactive map of Viimsi staadion
- Former names: Kirovi staadion Same staadion
- Location: Haabneeme, Estonia
- Owner: Kirovi kalurikolhoos (1975–1990); AS Same (1992–2004); Viimsi Haldus (2004–2007); Nord West KV (2007–2016); A&K Holding (2017–unknown)
- Capacity: 3,000 (1975–2003); 2,000 (2003–2014)
- Surface: Grass
- Field size: 105 × 70 m

Construction
- Opened: 1975
- Closed: 2014
- Architect: Ado Eigi

Tenants
- FC Lantana (1996–1999); Tallinn Sharks (2007–?); Estonia national rugby union team

Viimsi staadion was a multi-purpose stadium in Haabneeme, Viimsi Parish, Estonia, just outside the capital Tallinn. It was opened in 1975 and at its peak had a capacity of 3,000. The stadium was formerly used by the now-defunct Lantana Tallinn football club.

The address of the stadium was Sõpruse 7, 74001 Viimsi Parish.

== History ==
=== Kirov era ===
Viimsi Stadium was built in 1975 by the Kirov Collective Fishing Farm to celebrate their 25th anniversary. In addition to the 3,000-seat stadium, the sports complex also facilitated a shooting range under the grandstand.

In 1981, with a result of 8221 points (8104 points according to today's parameters), Valter Külvet set a decathlon U18 world record at Viimsi Stadium.

=== Multiple changes of ownership ===
After the Estonian Restoration of Independence, the stadium was privatised by AS Same in 1992. From 1996 to 1999, Viimsi Stadium served as a home ground for FC Lantana Tallinn and saw the club crowned Estonian champions in the 1996/97 season. 2003 saw the stadium's grandstand converted into a hotel, meaning the capacity of the stadium was reduced from 3,000 to 2,000. From 2007, the stadium was home to the Tallinn Rugby Football Club and the temporary home of the Estonia national rugby union team via cooperation between the Estonian Rugby Union and Nord West Kinnisvara OÜ.

During the 2000s, the property became a subject of interest for multiple real estate developers, which resulted in the stadium itself being left unmaintained and in a particularly bad condition. In 2014, Rimi Viimsi Market shopping centre began construction at the southern half of the sports ground. That marked the end for the former Viimsi Stadium.

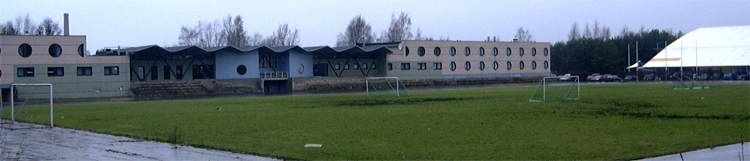
