= Rugby in Norway =

Rugby in Norway may refer to:

- Rugby league in Norway
- Rugby union in Norway
