= RC Přelouč =

Czech rugby union club, based in Přelouč

- Full name: Rugby Club Přelouč
- Founded: 1974; 52 years ago (as TJ Tesla Přelouč)
- Location: Přelouč, Czech Republic
- Ground: Rugbyové hřiště PARKHEM
- President: (Czech Republic) Bořivoj Trejbal
- Coach: (Czech Republic) Martin Kohout
- Captain: (Czech Republic) Petr Musil
- League: 1. Liga ragby XV
Team kit

RC Přelouč is a Czech rugby union club based in Přelouč. They currently play in the 1. Liga ragby XV.

== History ==
The club was founded on 16 June 1974 by Leopold Blachut, Jiří Mít and Jiří Franta out of the former Dukla Přelouč military team. They played their first match on 14 September 1974 against Slavia Prague B in Prague, eventually losing 35-41 after trailing 9-11 at half-time.

In 1987 the club undertook its first overseas tour, to France.

They qualified for the first ever KB extraliga back in 1993, after beating Bystrc, (then known as Lokomotiva-Ingstav Brno), and Olomouc in qualifying matches.

In 1998 the club withdrew from the 1998/99 season after three rounds due to lack of players and financial difficulties.

== Historical names ==
- TJ Tesla Přelouč (1974–1990)
- RC Přelouč (1990-)
