= 2018–19 Rugby Europe Women's Trophy =

2018–19 Women's European Trophy
- Date: 13 October, 2018 - 16 March, 2019

Final positions
- Champions: Czech Republic
- Runner-up: Switzerland

Tournament statistics
- Matches played: 4

The 2018–19 Rugby Europe Women's Trophy was the ninth edition of Rugby Europe's second division competition for women's national rugby union teams. The tournament was contested by the Czech Republic, Finland and Switzerland as a round-robin played over two seasons in 2018 and 2019.

== Standings ==
2018–19 Rugby Europe Women's Trophy
#	Team	P	W	D	L	PF	PA	PD	TB	LB	Pts
1	Czech Republic	2	2	0	0	25	5	+20	1	0	9
2	Switzerland	2	1	0	1	25	15	+10	0	1	5
3	Finland	2	0	0	2	5	35	−30	0	0	0

== Results ==
2018-10-13
10:25 CET (UTC+1)

Finland	5–20; Report	Switzerland

Helsinki, Finland

2018-11-17
12:53 CET (UTC+1)
Konektor Cup

Switzerland	5–10; Report	Czech Republic

Yverdon-les-Bains, Switzerland

2019-03-16
10:50 CET (UTC+1)

Czech Republic	15–0; Report	Finland

Prague, Czech Republic

== See also ==
- 2018 Rugby Europe Women's Championship
- 2019 Rugby Europe Women's Championship
- Rugby Europe Women's Championship
- Women's international rugby union § 2018
- Women's international rugby union § 2019
