= RC Havířov =

Czech rugby union club, based in Havířov

- Full name: Rugby Club Havířov
- Founded: 1966; 60 years ago (as TJ Slavia Havířov)
- Location: Havířov, Czech Republic
- President: (Czech Republic) Radomír Kloda
- Coach: (Czech Republic) Patrik Kovács
- Captain: (Czech Republic) Lukáš Macháček
- League: 1. Liga ragby XV
Team kit

RC Havířov is a Czech rugby union club based in Havířov. They currently play in the 1. Liga ragby XV.

== History ==
The club was founded in 1966 by Eduard Vaníček and Karel Gaman, two ex-Lokomotiva Ostrava (now Sokol Mariánské Hory) players.

Initially the club had only a youth team, but a senior side was added in 1972. The club changed its name to the present one in 1998.

The club was relegated from Extraliga ragby XV in 2007. They later returned to the Extraliga, finishing in second place in 2012.

== Honours ==
- První Liga winner
  - 2001, 2003, 2010, 2017
- Czech Cup winner
  - 2005, 2007, 2008
- Czech Sevens Championship winner
  - 2004, 2006
