= 2026 Rugby Europe Women's Championship =

Tournament details
- Date: 28 March – 18 April 2026
- Teams: Belgium; Netherlands; Portugal; Spain

Tournament statistics
- Matches played: 4
- Tries scored: 31 (7.75 per match)
- Attendance: 2,200 (550 per match)
- Website: Rugby Europe

The 2026 Rugby Europe Women's Championship is the 29th edition of Rugby Europe's first division competition for women's national rugby union teams. It began on 28 March and conclude on 18 April 2026.

Belgium entered as the new team in the Championship, they were promoted after Sweden requested to return to the Trophy division due to internal circumstances.

== Standings ==
Pos	Team	Pld	W	D	L	PF	PA	PD	TF	TA	TB	LB	Pts
1	Spain	3	3	0	0	127	24	+103	20	4	3	0	15
2	Netherlands	3	2	0	1	119	43	+76	19	6	2	0	10
3	Belgium	3	1	0	2	15	85	−70	3	15	0	0	4
4	Portugal	3	0	0	3	10	119	−109	2	19	0	0	0

== Fixtures ==
=== Round 1 ===
28 March 2026
16:00 CET (UTC+1)

(1BP) Spain	39–0	Belgium
Try: Tecla Masoko Bueriberi (2) 12' m, 18' m Amalia Argudo (2) 14' m, 26' c Amaia Erbina 37' m Nuria Jou 42' m Valentina Lucia Perez Marquez 77' c Con: Amalia Argudo (2) 27', 78'

El Cantizal, Las Rozas
Attendance: 1000
Referee: Cara Senneka (DRV)

29 March 2026
13:00 CEST (UTC+2)

(1BP) Netherlands	59–0	Portugal
Try: Sydney de Weijer 4' c Linde van der Velden 8' c Mariet Luijken 23' c Isa Spoler 25' c Elizabeth Shermer 45' m Lieve Stallmann 53' c Pleuni Kievit 58' c Franka Holland 72' m Isabel Juna Du Pre 78' c Con: Isis Touw (7) 5', 9', 24', 26', 54', 59', 79'

National Rugby Center, Amsterdam
Attendance: 300
Referee: Maria Latos (DRV)

=== Round 2 ===
11 April 2026
16:00 WEST (UTC+1)

Portugal	5–45	Spain (1BP)
Try: Ana Margarida Mata 15' m		Try: Claudia Pérez 7' c Clàudia Peña 11' c Anael Fernández (2) 24' c, 80' c Bingbing Vergara 43' c Nuria Jou 70' m Amaia Erbina 77' m Con: Clàudia Peña (4) 8', 12', 25', 80+1'; Bingbing Vergara 44'; Cards: Ana Peralta (yellow card) 27'; Clàudia Peña (yellow card) 40'

Campo de Rugby da Moita, Moita
Attendance: 500
Referee: Katherine Ritchie (RFU)

11 April 2026
17:00 CEST (UTC+2)

Belgium	0–41	Netherlands (1BP)
Cards: Geertrui Vercaemer (yellow card) 29'; Loïse Danguy (yellow card) 53'		Try: Mariet Luijken (4) 12' m, 37' c, 64' c, 69' m Inger Jongerius 30' c Anoushka Beukers 54' m Isa Suzanne Annemijn Spoler 71' m Con: Isis Touw (3) 31', 38', 65'

Sportcomplex Sint-Gillis, Dendermonde
Attendance: 400
Referee: Beatrice Smussi (FIR)

=== Round 3 ===
18 April 2026
15:00 CEST (UTC+2)

Netherlands	19–43	Spain
Try: Beukers 15' m Spoler 40' c Luijken 69'; Con: Touw (2/3) 40', 70'		Try: Cano Resino 4' c Erbina Araña 7' m Peña Hidalgo 17' c Ardugo Llobregat 66' c Sanchez Rodriguez 76' c Cortes Ekobo 82' c Con: Ardugo Llobregat (5/6) 5', 18'. 67', 77', 83'; Pen: Ardugo Llobregat 47'; Cards: Toca Altes (yellow card) 37'

National Rugby Center, Amsterdam
Referee: Robert Adele (Belgium Rugby)

18 April 2026
17:00 CEST (UTC+2)

Belgium	15–5	Portugal
Try: Gernaey 12' m Van Der Zjipen 44' m Bokonda Tshiama 63' m		Try: Teixeira 68' m Cards: Torres (yellow card) 74'

Sportcomplex Sint-Gillis, Dendermonde
Referee: Gauthier Marion (Monaco Rugby)
