= 2019–20 Rugby Europe Women's Trophy =

2019–20 Women's European Trophy
- Date: 12 October, 2019 - 23 November, 2019

Final positions
- Champions: Czech Republic
- Runner-up: Switzerland

Tournament statistics
- Matches played: 5

The 2019–20 Rugby Europe Women's Trophy was the tenth edition of Rugby Europe's second division competition for women's national rugby union teams. The tournament was contested by the Czech Republic, Finland, Sweden and Switzerland as a round-robin played in 2019. The trophy was won by the Czech Republic.

== Standings ==
2019–20 Rugby Europe Women's Trophy
| # | Team | P | W | D | L | PF | PA | PD | TB | LB | Pts |
|---|---|---|---|---|---|---|---|---|---|---|---|
| 1 | Czech Republic | 3 | 2 | 1 | 0 | 37 | 15 | +22 | 0 | 0 | 10 |
| 2 | Switzerland | 2 | 1 | 0 | 1 | 37 | 15 | +22 | 1 | 0 | 5 |
| 3 | Sweden | 2 | 1 | 0 | 1 | 24 | 24 | 0 | 0 | 0 | 4 |
| 4 | Finland | 3 | 0 | 1 | 2 | 12 | 56 | −44 | 0 | 0 | 2 |

== Results ==
2019-10-12
11:00 UTC

| Finland | 5–5 | Czech Republic |

Helsinki, Finland

2019-11-02
13:00 UTC

| Sweden | 19–7 | Finland |

Malmö, Sweden

2019-11-09
12:00 UTC

| Czech Republic | 15–5 | Switzerland |

Brno, Czech Republic

2019-11-16
12:00 UTC

| Czech Republic | 17–5 | Sweden |

Prague, Czech Republic

2019-11-23
13:00 UTC

| Switzerland | 32–0 | Finland |

Yverdon, Switzerland

== See also ==
- 2019 Rugby Europe Women's Championship
- Rugby Europe Women's Championship
- Women's international rugby union § 2019
