= Vaasa RC =

Rugby club in Vaasa, Finland

- Full name: Vaasa Rugby Club
- Nickname(s): Vaasa Wolves (men's); Vaasa Foxes (women's)
- Founded: 2002 (Wolves); 2010 (Foxes)
- Location: Vaasa, Finland
- Ground(s): Vaskiluodon kenttä
- Chairman: Sauli Tyvi
- Coach(es): Aarne Ritala (Wolves); Jonna Ritala (Foxes)
Team kit

Vaasa Rugby Club or Vaasa RC is a Finnish rugby club in Vaasa. The men's team, called the Vaasa Wolves, and the women's team, called the Vaasa Foxes, operate under the club. The men's team has not participated in the Finnish Championship League since 2019. Vaasa Foxes play in the women's rugby 7's Finnish Championship series.
