= Estonian Rugby Union =

Sports governing body in Estonia

Eesti Ragbi Liit
- Sport: Rugby union
- Founded: 2007; 18 years ago
- World Rugby affiliation: Not affiliated
- FIRA affiliation: 2009; 16 years ago
- President: Ragnar Toompere
- Website: www.rugby.ee

The Estonian Rugby Union (Estonian: Eesti Ragbi Liit) is the governing body of rugby union in Estonia and was formed in 2007 in response to FIRA-AER expulsion of the Estonian Rugby Federation. In June 2009 the Estonian Rugby Union formally received recognition as the governing body of Rugby Union in Estonia from the Estonian Olympic Committee with permission to represent Estonia at international level.

In 2008 the Estonian Rugby Union signed a contract with Advanced Micro Devices to the primary sponsor of Rugby in Estonia and in July 2009 AS Tallink, the largest ferry company in Estonia, agreed to support the Union. Stash are the provider of playing kit for the Estonian Rugby Union.

== History ==
A combined Estonia/Latvia side took on a Swedish representative side in the late 1990s, but a proper national team only started playing in 2009, touring England and playing two matches, losing both.

They came up against Kent club Tonbridge Juddians in their first match, coming out at the wrong end of a 94–7 scoreline. The Juddians gave them a rather torrid time in the scrums, which was probably influenced by the fact that the Estonians only had their first-ever scrum machine session on the morning of the match.

The second fixture saw them square off against England Deaf at Folkestone, this time managing to keep the score to a respectable 21–27.

On 28 September 2013 The Estonians won their first official fixture against Finland A in Turku, Finland. With a score of 24 to 17.

== Active rugby clubs ==
The Estonian Rugby Union currently has 5 registered clubs:

- RFC Kalev (formerly RFC Tallinn Sharks) in Tallinn
- RFC Vikat in Märjamaa
- RFC Patriots in Narva
- RFC Survivors in Pärnu
- RFC Tartu in Tartu

== See also ==
- Rugby union in Estonia
- Estonia national rugby union team
