= 1. Liga ragby XV =

Rugby union league in Czech Republic

- Current season, competition or edition: 2024 1. Liga ragby XV
- Sport: Rugby union
- Founded: 1993
- No. of teams: 7
- Country: Czech Republic
- Level on pyramid: 2
- Promotion to: Extraliga ragby XV
- Website: Czech Rugby Union: 1. Liga ragby XV

The 1. Liga ragby XV is the second level of domestic club rugby union in the Czech Republic, below the first division, the Extraliga ragby XV. There is also one club from Slovakia in the league.

The season runs from mid-September to the end of May.

== History ==
The league started out as the Druhá Liga (Second League), but was renamed the První Liga (First League) in the 1999-2000 season. For sponsorship reasons it has been called KB První Liga until the 2015/16 season.

== Current teams ==
2024 season

Location of teams in the 1. Liga ragby XV 2024
Location of teams in the 1. Liga ragby XV 2024

Club	Full name	City	Stadium
RC Bystrc	Rugby Club Brno Bystrc	Brno	N/A
RK Petrovice	Ragby Klub Petrovice	Petrovice (Prague)	N/A
RC Přelouč	Rugby Club Přelouč	Přelouč	Rugbyové hřiště PARKHEM
RC Donau	Rugby Union Donau Wien	Vienna, Austria	Donau Rugby Park
TJ Sokol Mariánské Hory	Tělocvičná jednota Sokol Mariánské Hory	Mariánské Hory (Ostrava)	N/A
RC Říčany B	RC Mountfield Říčany	Říčany	Stadion Josefa Kohouta
RC Havířov	Rugby Club Havířov	Havířov	Sportovní hala Slavie
RC Šumava Nýrsko	Rugby Šumava Nýrsko	Nýrsko	hřiště v Nýrsku

== Champions ==
Year	Champion
1993
1994
1995
1996
1997	RC Zlín
1998	RC Zlín
1999
2000
2001	RC Havířov
2002	RC Havířov
2003	RC Havířov
2004	RC Slavia Prague
2005	RC Bystrc
2006
2007	Praga Rugby nebo RC Zlín
2008	RC Bystrc
2009
2010	RC Havířov
2011	RC Bystrc
2012	RC Bystrc
