= Chrášťany (Prague-West District) =

- Municipality
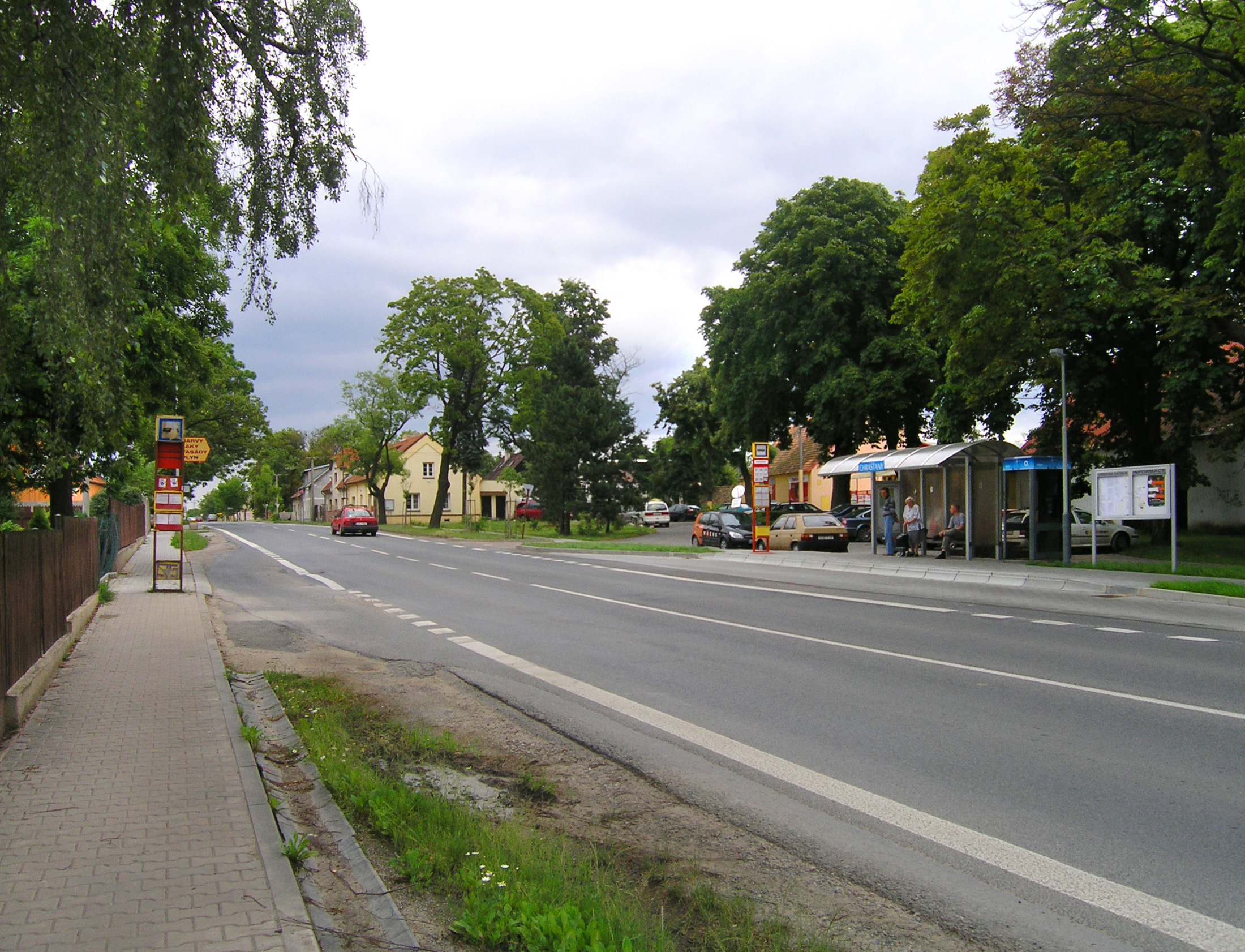
- Common and main road

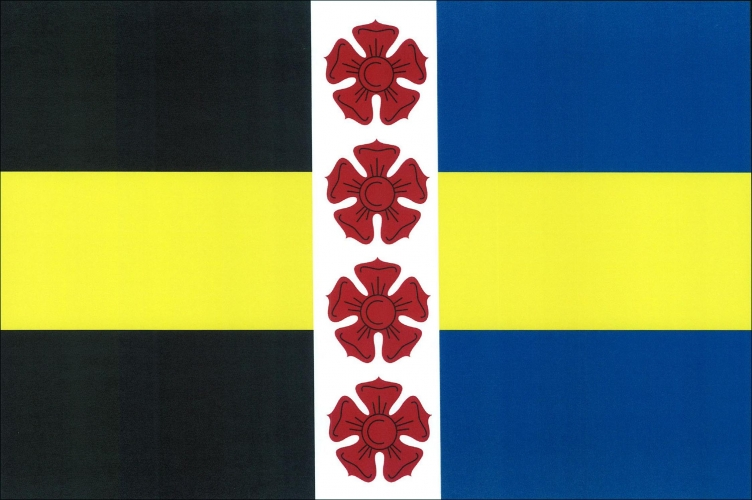
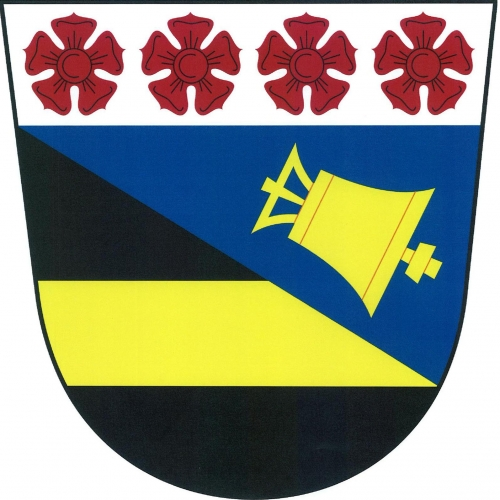
- Flag Coat of arms

- Location in the Czech Republic
- Coordinates: 50°2′46″N 14°15′41″E
- Country: Czech Republic
- Region: Central Bohemian
- District: Prague-West
- First mentioned: 1115

Area
  - Total: 4.15 km^{2} (1.60 sq mi)
- Elevation: 384 m (1,260 ft)

Population (2026-01-01)
  - Total: 1,257
  - Density: 303/km^{2} (784/sq mi)
- Time zone: UTC+1 (CET)
  - Summer (DST): UTC+2 (CEST)
- Postal code: 252 19
- Website: www.chrastanyuprahy.eu

Chrášťany is a municipality and village in Prague-West District in the Central Bohemian Region of the Czech Republic. It has about 1,300 inhabitants.

== Demographics ==
Historical population
Year	Pop.	±%
1869	382	—
1880	412	+7.9%
1890	508	+23.3%
1900	513	+1.0%
1910	495	−3.5%
1921	455	−8.1%
1930	676	+48.6%
1950	597	−11.7%
1961	645	+8.0%
1970	623	−3.4%
1980	570	−8.5%
1991	530	−7.0%
2001	524	−1.1%
2011	854	+63.0%
2021	1,053	+23.3%
Source: Censuses
