= 2024 Rugby Europe Women's Championship =

Tournament details
- Date: 3 February – 12 April 2024
- Teams: Netherlands; Portugal; Spain; Sweden

Final positions
- Champions: Spain
- Runner-up: Netherlands

Tournament statistics
- Matches played: 6
- Tries scored: 36 (6 per match)
- Attendance: 2,850 (475 per match)
- Website: Rugby Europe

The 2024 Rugby Europe Women's Championship was the 27th edition of Rugby Europe's first division competition for women's national rugby union teams. It kicked off on 3 February and concluded on 12 April 2024. The winner earned a place in the 2024 WXV. This season was the first year that the competition featured four teams.

Portugal entered as the new team in the Championship, they were promoted after winning the 2022–23 Rugby Europe Women's Trophy.

Spain won their seventh consecutive title after going undefeated throughout the tournament.

== Standings ==
Position	Nation	Matches				Points			Tries		Bonus points	Table points
Position	Nation	Played	Won	Drawn	Lost	For	Against	Diff	For	Against	Bonus points	Table points
1	Spain	3	3	0	0	99	5	+94	16	1	2	14
2	Netherlands	3	2	0	1	95	29	+66	17	4	2	10
3	Portugal	3	1	0	2	34	55	–21	5	9	1	5
4	Sweden	3	0	0	3	0	139	–139	0	24	0	0

== Fixtures ==
3 February 2024
16:30 CET (UTC+1)

(1 BP) Netherlands	59–0	Sweden
Try: Van Nifterik 4' m Jongerius (2) 8' c, 27' m Veerkamp 14' m Prins 24' m Stallmann 33' m Dix 40' m Selbeck 42' m Karst 45' c Boot 53' m Luijken 63' m Con: Touw (1/4) 9'; Lemmens (1/3) 46'; Cards: Isa Prins (yellow card) 80+2' to end'	Report

NRCA Stadium, Amsterdam
Attendance: 800
Referee: Nino Eloshvili (Georgia)

24 February 2024
12:30 WET (UTC+0)

Portugal	7–31	Netherlands (1 BP)
Try: Marques 14' c Con: Correia (1/1) 15'; Cards: Ana Casas (yellow card) 49' to 59'; Mariana Marques (yellow card) 62' to 72'	Report	Try: Boot 7' c Stallmann 30' m Beukers (2) 41' m, 70' c Dix 52'; Con: Metz (2/4) 8', 53'; Lemmens (1/1) 71'

CAR Jamor, Lisbon
Attendance: 500
Referee: Jenny Lee (Spain)

9 March 2024
15:00 WET (UTC+0)

Portugal	27–0	Sweden
Try: Morant 24' c Marques 36' m Santos (2) 51' c, 55' m Con: Correia (2/4) 25', 52'; Pen: Correia (1/1) 44'; Cards: Moreira (yellow card) 40' to 50'	Report

CAR Jamor, Lisbon
Attendance: 200
Referee: Katie Ritchie (Netherlands)

30 March 2024
17:00 CET (UTC+1)

Spain	24–0	Portugal
Try: Blanco Herrera 8' m Peña Hidalgo 21' c Del Castillo 40' c Diaz 59' m Con: Argudo (2/4) 22', 41'	Report

Poliesportiu de Pins Vens, Sitges
Attendance: 450
Referee: Jennifer Ann Davies (Wales)

6 April 2024
13:00 CEST (UTC+2)

Netherlands	5–22	Spain
Try: Karst 57' m	Report	Try: Pineiro 3' c Piquero 17' m Peña Hidalgo 32' m Con: Argudo (2/3) 4', 18'; Pen: Peña Hidalgo 60'

NRCA Stadium, Amsterdam
Attendance: 600
Referee: Melissa Leboeuf (France)

13 April 2024
13:00 CEST (UTC+2)

Sweden	0–53	Spain
	Report	Try: Piquero (4) 2' m, 46' m, 68' m, 80' m Pérez 8' c Cisa 17' c Capell 32' c Gorrochategui 57' c Blanco 78' m Con: Claudia Peña (4) 9', 18', 33', 58'

Östervångsstadion, Trelleborg
Attendance: 300
Referee: Doriane Domenjo (France)
