= Espoo Rugby Club =

Finnish rugby club in Espoo

- Full name: Espoo Rugby Club
- Nickname(s): Ice Bears
- Founded: 2013
- Location: Espoo, Finland
- Ground(s): Otaniemen Urheilupuisto
- Chairman: (Finland) Mikko Lakkonen
- Coach(es): (Spain) Eduardo Anaya Plaza
- League(s): Finnish 1st division
Team kit

Espoo Rugby Club is a Finnish rugby club in Espoo.

== History ==
The club was founded in autumn 2013 and debuted in the Finnish Championship League in 2014. The club was relegated from the Finnish Championship League in 2016 and has been playing in the Finnish 1st division since then.
