= 2021–22 Rugby Europe Women's Trophy =

2021–22 Women's European Trophy
- Date: 16 Oct 2021 - 28 May 2022
- Countries: Czech Republic; Finland; Sweden; Switzerland; Belgium; Germany; Portugal

Final positions
- Champions: Sweden
- Runner-up: Czech Republic

Tournament statistics
- Matches played: 6

The 2021–22 Rugby Europe Women's Trophy was the eleventh edition of Rugby Europe's second division competition for women's national rugby union teams. It will be contested in two pools. Pool A plays a single round-robin while Pool B will only play matches they can play. Sweden won the Trophy championship after beating Switzerland 48–0 in the final round.

== Standings ==
Pool A
Pos	Team	Pld	W	D	L	PF	PA	PD	BP	Pts
1	Sweden	3	3	0	0	103	22	+81	2	14
2	Czech Republic	3	2	0	1	78	43	+35	2	10
3	Finland	3	1	0	2	102	63	+39	1	5
4	Switzerland	3	0	0	3	0	155	−155	0	0

Pool B
Pos	Team	Pld	W	D	L	PF	PA	PD	BP	Pts
1	Portugal	2	2	0	0	67	8	+59	1	9
2	Belgium	1	0	0	1	8	10	−2	1	1
3	Germany	1	0	0	1	0	57	−57	0	0

== Results ==
=== Round 1 ===
2021-10-16

Finland	10–24; Report	Sweden

Helsinki, Finland

LP	1	Elisa LOPONEN
HK	2	Veera KUUSISTO
TP	3	Sarianna HAAVISTO
LL	4	Satu HEIKKONEN
RL	5	Hanna VISURI (c)
BF	6	Susanna HAAVISTO
OF	7	Reetta TENHU
N8	8	Ulla TUOMAINEN
SH	9	Jenny SAPATTINEN
FH	10	Ida HERRGARD
LW	11	Venla LEHTONEN
IC	12	Elisa SALONEN
OC	13	Anna SOILUVA
RW	14	Kiira KUPIAINEN
FB	15	Heidi HENNESSY
Replacements:
	16	Teija ALASALMI
	17	Janina KARKKAINEN
	18	Liisa LEMETTILA
	19	Kati HEIKKONEN
	20	Kati LESKINEN
	21	Jenna KOSKINEN
	22	Rosanna BOSWELL
	23	Marina HARJUNPAA
Coach:
Stephen WHITTAKER

LP	1	Tove VIKSTEN (c)
HK	2	Sara LENNVALL
TP	3	Pauline SARG
LL	4	Maja FRAMMING
RL	5	Cornelia NOREN
BF	6	Emma YTTERBOM
OF	7	Emma SKAGERLIND
N8	8	Michaela BROWN
SH	9	Frida NILSSON
FH	10	Victoria PETERSSON
LW	11	Sonia SMOLINA
IC	12	Katie CHILDS
OC	13	Minonna NUNSTEDT
RW	14	Linda HAKANSSON
FB	15	Michelle JOHANSSON
Replacements:
	16	Cay LINDBERG
	17	Linn OLFORSER
	18	Jennifer SUNDQVIST
	19	Linnea FLYMAN
	20	Maja MEULLER
	21	Carina Trinh TRINH
	22	Tess PROOS
	23	Sara JACOBSSON
Coach:
Claire CRUIKSHANK

=== Round 2 ===
2021-10-30

Sweden	31–12; Report	Czech Republic

Norrköping, Sweden

LP	1	Tove VIKSTEN (c)
HK	2	Sara LENNVALL
TP	3	Pauline SARG
LL	4	Linnea FLYMAN
RL	5	Cornelia NOREN
BF	6	Maja MEULLER
OF	7	Emma SKAGERLIND
N8	8	Elin STERNER
SH	9	Matilda TORESATER
FH	10	Tess PROOS
LW	11	Sofya SMOLINA
IC	12	Victoria PETERSSON
OC	13	Minonna NUNSTEDT
RW	14	Linda HAKANSSON
FB	15	Amanda SWARTZ
Replacements:
	16	Emma YTTERBOM
	17	Linn OLFORSER
	18	Jennifer SUNDQVIST
	19	Maja FRAMMING
	20	Michaela BROWN
	21	Frida NILSSON
	22	Katie CHILDS
	23	Carina TRINH
Coach:
Claire CRUIKSHANK

LP	1	Dominika HOLCIKOVA
HK	2	Aneta SMEJDOVA
TP	3	Karolina FILSAKOVA
LL	4	Petra KRIKLANOVA
RL	5	Bohuslava HOSTINSKA
BF	6	Kristyna PLEVOVA
OF	7	Tereza HAFFNEROVA
N8	8	Sara Lea EXNEROVA
SH	9	Tess BRAUNEROVA
FH	10	Karolina HUDECKOVA
LW	11	Katelina NOVAKOVA
IC	12	Julie DOLEZILOVA
OC	13	Michaela KOVAROVA
RW	14	Tereza BATHOVA
FB	15	Petra VACKOVA
Replacements:
	16	Natalie KOLLMANOVA
	17	Gabriela SPACKOVA
	18	Alzbeta SUSOVA
	19	Anna BENESOVA
	20	Jana URBANOVA
	21	Zuzana ZAROSKA
	22	Viktorie LANEOVA
	23	Hana BEHALOVA
Coach:
Petr Porizek

=== Round 3 ===
2021-11-06

Czech Republic	39–12; Report	Finland

FFC Rugby Aréna Tatra Smíchov
Czech Republic

LP	1	Alzbeta SUSOVA
HK	2	Aneta SMEJDOVA
TP	3	Dominika HOLCIKOVA
LL	4	Petra KRIKLANOVA (c)
RL	5	Kristyna PLEVOVA
BF	6	Jana URBANOVA
OF	7	Tereza HAFFNEROVA
N8	8	Sara Lea EXNEROVA
SH	9	Klara HLADILOVA
FH	10	Karolina HUDECKOVA
LW	11	Pavlina CUPROVA
IC	12	Katelina NOVAKOVA
OC	13	Julie DOLEZILOVA
RW	14	Michaela KOVAROVA
FB	15	Petra VACKOVA
Replacements:
	16	Karolina FILSAKOVA
	17	Gabriela SPACKOVA
	18	Katerina BURIANOVA
	19	Bohuslava HOSTINSKA
	20	Lucie ZBOROVSKA
	21	Zuzana ZAROSKA
	22	Viktorie LANEOVA
	23	Tereza BATHOVA
Coach:
Petr PORIZEK

LP	1	Elisa LOPONEN
HK	2	Veera KUUSISTO
TP	3	Sarianna HAAVISTO
LL	4	Camilla GARBUTT-UUSILEHTO
RL	5	Satu HEIKKONEN
BF	6	Susanna HAAVISTO
OF	7	Reetta TENHU
N8	8	Hanna VISURI (c)
SH	9	Jenny SAPATTINEN
FH	10	Ida HERRGARD
LW	11	Venla LEHTONEN
IC	12	Elisa SALONEN
OC	13	Anna SOILUVA
RW	14	Julia KIEKEBEN
FB	15	Eeva POHJANHEIMO
Replacements:
	16	Teija ALASALMI
	17	Janina KARKKAINEN
	18	Reetta JOKINEN
	19	Tuuli HERMUNEN
	20	Sanni HONKANEN
	21	Rosanna BOSWELL
	22	Taru PEKKI
	23	Marina HARJUNPAA
Coach:
Stephen WHITTAKER

=== Round 4 ===
2021-11-13

Switzerland	0–27; Report	Czech Republic

Colovray Sports Centre, Switzerland

FB	15	Emily MARCLAY
RW	14	Lami DAMACHI
OC	13	Carole CASPARIS
IC	12	Claire OESTREICHER
LW	11	Anne THIEBAUD
FH	10	Louise KUSS
SH	9	Kim ANDREY EVANS
N8	8	Chantal MARITZ
OF	7	Monica IACHIZZI
BF	6	Sophie MORSCHER
RL	5	Julie GAUDIN
LL	4	Nicole IMSAND
TP	3	Oumou BARRY
HK	2	Stephanie KLUPP
LP	1	Angela STADELMANN
Replacements:
	16	Carole GACHET
	17	Sabrina WALTI
	18	Pauline CLOPT
	19	Niki ZAAL
	20	Rebekka HOSCH
	21	Manon MEUNIER
	22	Simone HAYMOZ
Coach:
Nick BLACKWELL

FB	15	Petra VACKOVA
RW	14	Michaela KOVAROVA
OC	13	Julie DOLEZILOVA
IC	12	Katerina NOVAKOVA
LW	11	Pavlina CUPROVA
FH	10	Karolina HUDECKOVA
SH	9	Klara HLADILOVA
N8	8	Sara Lea EXNEROVA
OF	7	Tereza HAFFNEROVA
BF	6	Jana URBANOVA
RL	5	Kristyna PLEVOVA
LL	4	Petra KRIKLANOVA
TP	3	Dominika HOLCIKOVA
HK	2	Aneta SMEJDOVA
LP	1	Alzbeta SUSOVA
Replacements:
	16	Karolina FILSAKOVA
	17	Gabriela SPACKOVA
	18	Natalie KOLLMANOVA
	19	Bohuslava HOSTINSKA
	20	Lucie ZBOROVSKA
	21	Kristyna JUNGEROVA
	22	Viktorie LANCOVA
	23	Tereza BATHOVA
Coach:
Petr PORIZEK

=== Round 5 ===
2021-12-04

Portugal	10–8 Report	Belgium

Jamor Stadium, Lisbon, Portugal

FB	15	Catia JOAO
RW	14	Mariana SANTOS
OC	13	Mariana MARQUES
IC	12	Maria COSTA
LW	11	Antonia MARTINS
FH	10	Vera SIMOES (c)
SH	9	Maria VASQUEZ
N8	8	Arlete GONCALVES
OF	7	Adelina COSTA
BF	6	Sara MOREIRA
RL	5	Marcia SANTOS
LL	4	Joana BORLIDO
TP	3	Marta MAGALHAES
HK	2	Beatriz RODRIGUES
LP	1	Elsa SANTOS
Replacements:
	16	Sara FERNANDES
	17	Eduarda PIRES
	18	Neuza REIS
	19	Laura PEREIRA
	20	Francisca MENDES
	21	Ana SANTOS
	22	Beatriz TEIXEIRA
	23	Catia ALMEIDA
Coach:
Joao MOURA

FB	15	Romanie YSERBYT
RW	14	Noemie VAN DE POELE
OC	13	Line SOBCZAK
IC	12	Julie BIJNENS
LW	11	Charlotte TIMPERMAN
FH	10	Jeanne MARQUEGNIES
SH	9	Aude RISSELIN
N8	8	Helne SIMON
OF	7	Elodie Beatrice MUSCH
BF	6	Lorisse RANGER
RL	5	Laeticia MULENDA
LL	4	Nele MICHEM (c)
TP	3	Hanna DESSEIN
HK	2	Jade CLOOF
LP	1	Clotilde TOUSSAINT
Replacements:
	16	Nora CHAHAB
	17	Selina VANHEYST
	18	An-Marthe INGELAERE
	19	Manon BERTIN
	20	Sarah VERZIN
	21	Laurie PRIGNON
	22	Nele VAN DEN HAESSEVELDE
	23	Marie RUTSAERT
Coach:
Cathy DE GEYTER

=== Round 6 ===
2022-03-12 11:50 PM, 12:50 (Local)

Switzerland	0–48; Report	Sweden

Centre Sportif des Cherpines, Plan-les-Ouates, Switzerland

=== Round 7 ===
2022-04-30 18:00 PM, 17:00 (Local)

Portugal	57–0; Report	Germany

Car Jamor, Lisbon, Portugal

=== Round 8 ===
2022-05-28

Finland	80–0; Report	Switzerland

Hamarin Sports Ground, Porvoo, Finland

LP	1	Sarianna HAAVISTO
HK	2	Veera KUUSISTO
TP	3	Liisa LEMETTILÄ
LL	4	Ulla TUOMAINEN
RL	5	Hanna VISURI (c)
BF	6	Reetta TENHU
OF	7	Lilli TIKKANEN
N8	8	Anna SOILUVA
SH	9	Eve SAPATTINEN
FH	10	Jenna KOSKINEN
LW	11	Kiira KUPIAINEN
IC	12	Heidy HENNESSY
OC	13	Ida HERRGÅRD (VC)
RW	14	Ruusu HALTTUNEN
FB	15	Emmi OVASKAINEN
Replacements:
	16	Janina KARKKAINEN
	17	Sonja JURMU
	18	Riikka RASIMUS
	19	Kati HEIKKONEN
	20	Elisa LOPONEN
	21	Miia HYYRYNEN
	22	Venla LEHTONEN
	23	Mira SAARIKOSKI
Coach:
Jake PRATLEY

LP	1	Stephanie NERI
HK	2	Stephanie KLUPP
TP	3	Alexandra CORREIA RAPOSO
LL	4	Oumou BARRY
RL	5	Niki ZAAL
BF	6	Pauline CLOPT
OF	7	Monica IACHIZZI
N8	8	Sabrina WALTI
SH	9	Salome HOSCH
FH	10	Manon MEUNIER
LW	11	Sophie MORSCHER
IC	12	Judith ORIWAL
OC	13	Kim ANDREY-EVANS
RW	14	Jaya SALPERWYCK
FB	15	Mathilda LEA
Replacements:
	16	Rebecca ELLIS
	17	Aurelie LEMOUZY
	18	Angela STADELMANN
	19	Elyse ALBERTONI
	20	Carole GACHET
	21	Emma KELLER
	22	Giullia ARDIELLI
	23
Coach:
Nick BLACKWELL
