= Pori Rugby =

Finnish rugby union club, based in Pori, Finland

- Full name: Pori Rugby
- Nickname(s): Bombers (Men); Lollers (Women)
- Founded: 2011 (Women's team)
- Location: Pori, Finland
- Coach: Devin Barnes
- League: Finnish 1. Championship League
Team kit

Pori Rugby is a Finnish rugby club in Pori. The men's team is known as the Bombers and a women's team called the Lollers.
