= Rugby union in Norway =

- Country: Norway
- National team: Norway
- Registered players: 1000
- Clubs: 7

National competitions
- Rugby World Cup; Rugby World Cup Sevens; IRB Sevens World Series; European Nations Cup

Rugby union in Norway is a minor but growing sport.

For some years, Norway was perhaps the northernmost country to actively engage in the sport and boasted the world's most northernmost rugby club, Oslo RFC, which was founded in 1964.

== Governing body ==
The Norwegian Union was founded in 1982, and joined the IRFB in 1993.

== History ==
Norway was the last of the three Scandinavian countries to take up rugby. However, amongst the Nordic countries, it is by no means the weakest, Norway is good against smaller teams but is not very good under pressure but they still play well. as it is a more recent introduction to Finland, and has no presence in the other three nations. A major problem though, is the climate, which means that many pitches may be under snow for large parts of the year. Serious interest in the game began in the 1960s.

For many years, Oslo RFC was the most northerly rugby club in the world. Stavanger Rugby Club was formed in 1978 and played Oslo in the Autumn of that year, presenting Oslo with a trophy, a rock bit, in 1979, a return match was played in Stavanger; Oslo won both matches.. During the mid-1980s, Oslo RFC's nearest opposition in Norway was Stavanger, a round trip of 685 miles. Their nearest club was Karlstad RFC in Sweden a round trip of 310 miles.

Rugby has a much longer standing in neighbouring Sweden and Denmark, which have a combined figure of around 10,000 registered players, and it has been introduced there. Rugby union is also played in neighbouring Shetland, and visitors from there have toured Norway, including people from the British military bases and ships there.

Norway played its first international against Latvia who beat them 44–6. At the time, the Welsh fly-half Huw Howells was the driving force in trying to promote the game.

== Notable players ==
- Erik Lund, Leeds Carnegie, Biarritz and captain of Norway
- Anton Smith-Petersen, Harlequin F.C.

== See also ==
- Norway national rugby union team
