= Linna RC =

- Full name: Linna Rugby Club
- Founded: 2011
- Location: Hämeenlinna, Finland
Team kit

Linna RC is a Finnish rugby club in Hämeenlinna.
