= ARC Iuridica =

Czech rugby union club, based in Prague

ARC Iuridica Prague
- Full name: Akademický Rugby Club Iuridica Praha, z.s.
- Founded: 1956; 70 years ago
- Location: Prague, Czech Republic
- Ground: Chrášťany
Team kit

ARC Iuridica Prague is a Czech rugby union club based in Prague.

== History ==
=== Early years ===
The club was founded in 1956. It started when Zdeněk Sláma, a former Czechoslovak international, joined the Department of Physical Education at the Charles University in Prague. He began teaching rugby as an optional physical education subject.

In 1959 they took on the Law School and the Faculty of Nuclear Physics in an intra-university tournament to determine the university champions.

1971 saw them undertake their first overseas tour to Moscow, losing all three matches played; 0-54 and 3-30 to MAI and 3-40 to MVTU.

=== Recent history ===
On 7 November 2009, an old boys tournament was held in Prague in celebration of the 100th anniversary of the birth of club founder Zdeněk Sláma. The club's old boys took on Old Boys Prague and the Moravian Eagles.

== Historical names ==
- Rugby University Praha (1955-1959)
- Slavia VŠ Praha (1959-1960)
- Slavia HF UK Praha (1969-1977)
- VŠTJ Humanitních fakult UK Praha (1977-1990)
- VŠTJ Iuridica Praha (1990-1995)
- Akademický Rugby Club Iuridica Praha (1995-)

== Notable former players ==
- (Czech Republic) Pavel Telička - diplomat, president of the Czech Rugby Union (ČSRU)
