= Kuopio RC =

- Full name: Kuopio Rugby Club
- Location: Kuopio, Finland
- Chairman: Mika Partanen
- Coach(es): (England) David Baker, Ari Tikkanen
Team kit

Kuopio RC is a Finnish rugby club in Kuopio.
