= 2022–23 Rugby Europe Women's Trophy =

2022–23 Women's European Trophy
Tournament details
- Date: October 22, 2022 - May 2023
- Countries: Belgium; Czech Republic; Finland; Germany; Portugal
- Teams: 5

Final positions
- Champions: Portugal

Tournament statistics
- Matches played: 9
- Tries scored: 56 (6.22 per match)
- Attendance: 3,100 (344 per match)
- Website: Rugby Europe

The 2022–23 Rugby Europe Women's Trophy is the 12th edition of Rugby Europe's second division competition for women's national rugby union teams. The winner of the tournament will be promoted to the 2024 Championship.

== Standings ==
Pos	Team	P	W	D	L	PF	PA	PD	BP	Pts
1	Portugal	4	4	0	0	181	10	+171	4	20
2	Finland	3	2	0	1	46	44	+2	1	9
3	Germany	4	2	0	2	36	83	-47	0	8
4	Czech Republic	4	1	0	3	39	87	-48	2	6
5	Belgium	3	0	0	3	36	114	-78	1	1

== Results ==
2022-10-22	(1 BP) Finland	43–5	Germany	Myllypuro Sports Park, Helsinki
12:00 EEST (UTC+3)	Try: Sarianna Haavisto 23' m Emmi Ovaskainen 23' m Anna Soiluva (4) 37' c, 46' c, 49' m, 76' c Kati Heikkonen 73' c Con: Anna Soiluva (4/7) 38', 47', 74', 77'		Try: Lara Bürger 20' m	Attendance: 200; Referee: Hana Erika Radochová (CZE)

2022-10-22	Belgium	5–71	Portugal (1 BP)	Nelson Mandela Stadium, Brussels
12:30 CEST (UTC+2)	Try: Chanel Germiat 47' m		Try: Sara Moreira (2) 15' c, 41' c Neuza Reis 25' c Maria Costa (2) 28' c, 50' c Daniela Correia 36' c Beatriz Rodrigues 55' c Marta Magalhaes 62' c Mariana Santos 66' m Yara Fonseca 69' m Inês Spínola 81' m Con: Daniela Correia (8/11) 17', 26', 29', 37', 42', 51', 57', 63'	Attendance: 300; Referee: Nino Eloshvili (GEO)

2022-11-05	Germany	12–10	Czech Republic (1 BP)	Rugby Center, Hürth
14:30 CET (UTC+1)	Try: Laura Schwinn 72' c Steffi Gruber 80' m Con: Laura Schwinn (1/2) 73'; Cards: Mareike Bier (yellow card) 47' to 57'		Try: Pavlína Čuprová (2) 49' m, 53' m Cards: Alzbeta Susová (yellow card) 35' to 45'; Tereza Haffnerová (yellow card) 66' to 76'; Petra Vacková (yellow card) 72' to 80'	Attendance: 200; Referee: Maria Heitor (POR)

2022-11-19	(1 BP) Czech Republic	29–21	Belgium	Markéta Stadium, Prague
14:00 CET (UTC+1)	Try: Sára Lea Exnerova (2) 7' m, 58' m Tereza Bathova 12' c Katerina Novakova 21' m Pavlína Čuprová 23' c Con: Pavlína Čuprová (2) 13', 23'; Cards: Anezka Skalová (yellow card) 50' to 60'; Aneta Smejdova (yellow card) 67' to 77'		Try: Jade Cloof 36' c Clotilde Toussaint 44' c Madeleine Beriot 69' c Con: Jeanne Marquegnies (3) 37', 45', 69'	Attendance: 500; Referee: Lorena Martínez (ESP)

2023-02-04	(1 BP) Portugal	39–0	Finland	CAR Jamor, Oeiras
15:00 WET (UTC+0)	Try: Mariana Marques (3) 7' m, 50' m, 66' c Inês Spínola 24' m Mariana Santos 30' m Sara Moreira 34' m Adelina Costa 74' c Con: Daniela Correia 0/5; Isabel Ozório 2/2 67', 75'			Attendance: 150; Referee: Lorena Martínez (ESP)

2023-03-04	(1 BP) Portugal	51–0	Czech Republic	CAR Jamor, Oeiras
13:00 WET (UTC+0)	Try: Inês Spínola 22' m Leonor Amaral 29' c Ana Freire 34' m Isabel Ozório 47' c Matilde Goes (2) 59' c, 70' m Daniela Correia 76' c Raquel Costa 80' m Con: Daniela Correia (4/8) 30', 48', 60', 77'; Pen: Daniela Correia 7'		Cards: Anezka Skalová (yellow card) 20' to 30'; Alice Matejckova (yellow card) 47' to 57'	Attendance: 500; Referee: Alexandra Ferré (FRA)

2023-03-04	(1 BP) Belgium	10–14	Germany	Nelson Mandela Stadium, Brussels
17:30 CET (UTC+1)	Try: Lorisse Ranger 6' m Ciska De Grave 29' m		Try: Joy Weatherspoon 17' c Johanna Hacker 40' c Con: Laura Schwinn (2/2) 18', 40'; Cards: Melissa Paul (yellow card) 21' to 31'	Attendance: 500; Referee: Hana Erika Radochová (CZE)

2023-03-18	(1 BP) Czech Republic	0–3	Finland	Areálu Ondřeje Sekory, Brno
14:00 CET (UTC+1)	Cards: Petra Vacková (yellow card) 79' to 80'		Pen: Anna Soiluva 67'	Attendance: 350; Referee: Nino Eloshvili (GEO)

2023-04-15	Germany	5–20	Portugal (1 BP)	Rugby center, Hürth
15:00 CEST (UTC+2)	Try: Anja Fischer 80+5' m		Try: Ana Freire (2) 48' m, 64' m Matilde Goes 57' m Sara Moreira 80+1' m Cards: Marta Magalhaes (yellow card) 23' to 33'; Isabel Ozório (yellow card) 41' to 51'; Maria Costa (yellow card) 68' to 78'	Attendance: 400; Referee: Petra Druskovic (CRO)

Finland	Cancelled	Belgium

== Leading scorers ==
=== Most points ===
As of 21 April 2023

Rank	Player	Country	Points
1	Daniela Correia	Portugal	37
2	Anna Soiluva	Finland	31
3	Sara Moreira	Portugal	20
4	Pavlína Čuprová	Czech Republic	19
5	Ana Freire	Portugal	15
5	Inês Spínola	Portugal	15
5	Mariana Marques	Portugal	15
5	Matilde Goes	Portugal	15
9	Laura Schwinn	Germany	11

=== Most tries ===
As of 21 April 2023

Rank	Player	Country	Tries
1	Anna Soiluva	Finland	4
1	Sara Moreira	Portugal	4
3	Ana Freire	Portugal	3
3	Inês Spínola	Portugal	3
3	Mariana Marques	Portugal	3
3	Matilde Goes	Portugal	3
3	Pavlína Čuprová	Czech Republic	3
