= Warriors RC =

Warriors Rugby Club Helsinki
- Full name: Warriors Rugby Club
- Nickname: WRC
- Founded: 2001
- Location: Helsinki, Finland
- Ground: Tali sports park
- Chairman: Joel Catala
- Coach(es): John Wuatai-Tariau (men), Jack Beresford (women)
- League: Finnish Rugby Federation
Team kit

Warriors Rugby Club Helsinki or Warriors RC or WRC is a Finnish rugby club in Helsinki. The club was founded in 2001, when rugby as a sport was played by only a few individuals in Finland. During the first years, the club had players and members from more than 20 different countries.

Warriors was the first club in Finland to establish a women's rugby team, and has won four women's XV Championships. Today WRC is one of the most successful rugby clubs in Finland, has won many Finnish championships, and since 2007 always finished the men's XV's season in the top 2 (except 2017). In 2024, Warriors men won their historic10th Finnish XV Championship title. WRC also fields several national team players, and is the club with most licensed players in Finnish Rugby (as of 9/2024).

Warriors RC can be considered a pioneer in Finnish junior rugby, and is the first club to offer rugby for all age groups, from 3 years to adult level. As of 2023, half of the signed up U18 players in Finland are licensed to Warriors.

== Current teams ==
Warriors are currently fielding the following teams:

=== Women ===
- Women's 15's Championship team
- Women's 1st division team, together with HRC, Linna and Kalev ("Fuusio")
- Women's 7's team

Since 2018 Warriors Women's teams have been collaborating with Linna RC and playing under the team name 'WarriorsLinna', or short 'WaLi'. In the 2022 season, WaLi won at least one game against every competing ladies team in Finnish Rugby, 15s and 7s combined. In 2023, the team qualified for the championship final for the first time in 8 years.

=== Men ===
- Men's 15's Championship team
- Men's 15's Second division team (WRC2)
- Men's 7's team

=== Academy ===
Warriors youth program operates in 5 age groups: U5 (5 and under), U8, U11, U14, U18 and form teams as tournaments and competitions are organized. Warriors Academy has received a grant from the Ministry of Education and Culture (Finland) in 2021 to further develop junior rugby activities. The WRC Academy regularly organizes camps and open trainings to promote junior rugby in Finland.

=== Touch Rugby ===
Warriors organize Touch rugby trainings on a weekly basis. Warriors Touch team regularly competes in international club tournaments, and won the inaugural Finnish Touch Championship in 2025/6 organised by Suomen Rugbyliitto.

== Current standings ==
Women

- 2024: 3rd in Finnish XV Championship, Champion of Division I (Fuusio)
- 2023: 2nd in Finnish XV Championship
- 2022: 5th in Finnish XV Championship, Champion of Division I (second team)
- 2021: 5th in Finnish XV Championship

Men

- 2026: Finnish XV Champion - currently 4 times in a row champion
- 2025: Finnish XV Champion, Finnish VII Champion, Division 2 Champion
- 2024: Finnish XV Champion
- 2023: Finnish XV Champion

Mixed

- 2025-6: 1st in Finnish Touch Championship

== History ==
Women

- 2024: 3rd in Finnish XV Championship, Champion of Division I (Fuusio)
- 2023: 2nd in Finnish XV Championship
- 2022: Division I Champion, second team
- 2015: Finnish 7's series champions
- 2014: Finnish XV Championship, Finnish7's series champions
- 2013: Finnish 7's series champions, second in Finnish XV Championship
- 2012: Finnish XV Championship
- 2011: Finnish XV Championship
- 2009: Finnish XV Championship (as Fusion with Helsinki RC)

Men

- 2026: Finnish XV Champion,
- 2025: Finnish XV Champion, Finnish VII Champion, Division 2 Champion
- 2024: Finnish XV Champion
- 2023: Finnish XV Champion
- 2022: 2nd in Finnish XV Championship
- 2021: 2nd in Finnish XV Championship
- 2020: 2nd in Finnish XV Championship
- 2019: Finnish XV Champion
- 2018: Finnish XV Champion
- 2017: 3rd in Finnish XV Championship
- 2016: 2nd in Finnish XV Championship
- 2015: Finnish XV Champion
- 2014: 2nd in Finnish XV Championship
- 2013: 2nd in Finnish XV Championship
- 2012: Finnish XV Champion
- 2011: Finnish XV Champion
- 2010: Finnish XV Champion
- 2009: Finnish XV Champion
- 2008: Finnish XV Champion
- 2007: 2nd in Finnish XV Championship
- 2006: 3rd in Finnish XV Championship
- 2005: 3rd in Finnish XV Championship
- 2004: 6th in Finnish XV Championship
- 2003: 4th in Finnish XV Championship
- 2002: 3rd in Finnish XV Championship

--- Year 2002-2026 ---

SM XV Runner up

WRC 12 7

HRC 7 5

TRC 3 6

JRC 3 3

Eagles 0 2

OTS 0 1

== Homeground ==
Warrior play their home games in Myllypuro sports park. Trainings are mainly held in Tali sports park, from November–April indoors in Tali football hall, and from May–October outdoors.
