= RC Olomouc =

Czech rugby union club, based in Olomouc

- Full name: Rugby Club Olomouc
- Founded: 1953; 73 years ago
- Location: Olomouc, Czech Republic
- President: Dan Laštůvka
- Coach(es): Jiří Šivr, Erik Fišara
- League: 2. Liga ragby XV
Team kit	2nd kit

RC Olomouc is a Czech rugby union club based in Olomouc. They currently play in the 2. Liga ragby XV.

== History ==
The club was founded in 1953. It started when Miloš Dobrý, a former Czechoslovak international and the last president of the Czechoslovak union, moved to Olomouc from Prague in 1951. Initially the club consisted of the Dukla Zenit Olomouc army team and a civilian team.

One of the club's biggest problems in the early years was securing a home ground. They played at a number of grounds, in the Černovír and Holice areas of the city, the village of Bohuňovice, the race track in Lazce and an open field next to Andrův Stadium.

In 2003 the club celebrated its 50th anniversary.

== Historical names ==
- 1953 - 1960 Dukla Zenit Olomouc
- 1956 - 1958 TJ Spartak ŽPB Olomouc
- 1958–present RC Lokomotiva Olomouc
