= Porvoo RC =

Old Town Shamrocks Porvoo RC
- Full name: Old Town Shamrocks Porvoo Rugby Club
- Nickname: Shamrocks
- Founded: 2011
- Location: Porvoo, Finland
- Ground: Hamari
- Chairman: (Finland) Stefan Rogers
- Coach(es): (Finland) Marko Sallert & (Finland) Linus Backman
- League: Finnish Championship League
Team kit

Old Town Shamrocks Porvoo Rugby Club is a Finnish rugby club in Porvoo.

== History ==
The club was founded in 2011. In the 2012 and 2013 seasons, it played in Division 1. Despite losing the 2013 Division 1 final, the club was promoted due to the Finnish championship expanding to 10 teams. During this period, the team was coached by Bro Bannatyne.

In the 2014 season, the club finished in 9th place with 2 victories and 7 defeats. The following year, it improved to 5th place with 4 victories and 4 defeats. John King became the head coach in 2016, and the club was eliminated in the semi-finals by Helsinki RC. In 2017, after finishing the regular season in 3rd place, the club was defeated by Jyväskylä RC in the semi-final with a score of 58–19.

Casey Dent took over as head coach in 2018, leading the Shamrocks to a 4th-place finish. In 2019, they finished 3rd but lost the semi-final to the Warriors. The club maintained a 3rd-place finish in 2020 but again lost in the semi-final to Helsinki Rugby Club. In 2021, they finished 3rd and lost to the Warriors in the semi-final. The club placed 5th in both 2022 and 2023. In 2023, the head coach was Daniel Kerr.

In 2024, Marko Sallert became the head coach with Linus Backman as the assistant coach.
