= TJ Sokol Mariánské Hory =

Czech rugby union club, based in Ostrava

- Full name: Tělocvičná jednota Sokol Mariánské Hory
- Founded: 1947; 79 years ago
- Location: Ostrava, Czech Republic
- Ground(s): Raisova 12; Ostrava-Mariánské hory 709 00
- President: Petr Peterek
- Coach: Robert Vann
- League: 1. Liga ragby XV
Team kit

TJ Sokol Mariánské Hory is a Czech rugby union club based in Mariánské Hory, Ostrava. They currently play in the 1. Liga ragby XV.

== History ==
The club was founded in 1947. On 4 July of that year, they played their first match against a team called Slavia Brno.

In 1949 the club played against CFR Bucharest, their first match against opponents outside Czechoslovakia.

In 1979 they reached the final of the Czechoslovak Cup, losing to Praga Rugby 34-14.

More recently, in 2005, they won the Overton International Festival in Overton, England.

== Historical names ==
- Sokol Vítkovické Železárny (1947–53)
- Baník VŽKG Ostrava (1953–56)
- VŽKG Ostrava (1956–60)
- Lokomotiva Ostrava (1960–97)
- Sokol Mariánské Hory
