= Finnish Rugby Federation =

Governing body of rugby union in Finland

Suomen Rugbyliitto ry
- Sport: Rugby union
- Founded: 1968; 58 years ago
- World Rugby affiliation: 1999
- Rugby Europe affiliation: 1999
- President: (Venezuela) Alejandra Vargas
- Men's coach: (Wales) Andy Barlow
- Women's coach: (Italy) Leonardo Fierro
- Website: https://finland.rugby/

The Finnish Rugby Federation (SRL) (Finnish: Suomen Rugbyliitto) is recognised as the national governing body for rugby in Finland. It is a member of several organisations, including World Rugby and Rugby Europe. The SRL was founded in 1968 and has as its members Finnish rugby clubs and the Finland Rugby Referees Association.

SRL's mission is to develop the sport in Finland and support the local clubs in their activities. The organisation is responsible for the Men's National XV Team, Men's National Sevens Team, Women's National XV Team, Women's National Sevens Team. The SRL also administers and organises domestic rugby competitions in Finland.

Interest in rugby in Finland has increased in recent years and SRL strongly believes that rugby has a future in Finland, where team and contact sports are appreciated. This is indicated by significant financial and organisational support by the Finnish Ministry of Education and local council sport departments.
