= Portugal women's national rugby union team =

Portugal
- Union: Portuguese Rugby Federation
- Head coach: João Moura
First colours	Second colours

World Rugby ranking
- Current: 23 (as of 26 May 2025)
- Highest: 18 (2003)
- Lowest: 27 (2023)

First international
- Germany 50-0 Portugal (14 May 1995, Heidelberg)

Biggest win
- Belgium 5-71 Portugal (22 October 2022, Brussels)

Biggest defeat
- Netherlands 59-0 Portugal (29 March 2026, Amsterdam)

The Portugal national women's rugby union team are a national sporting side of Portugal, representing them at rugby union. They played their first test in 1995 against Germany.

== History ==
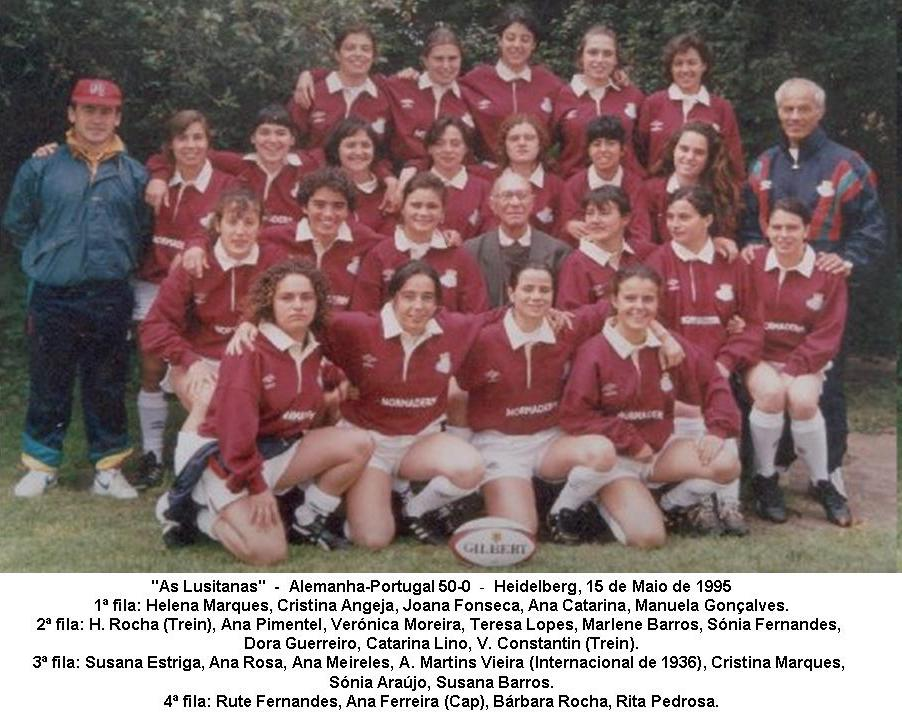
As Lusitanas, the 1995 team that played Portugal's first test match, versus Germany

Portugal played their first test match on 14 May 1995 against Germany, they lost 50–0 in Heidelberg. After 26 years of inactivity, they returned to the international scene in December 2021, they defeated Belgium 10–8 in Lisbon.

Portugal competed at the 2021–22 Rugby Europe Women's Trophy, they defeated Belgium and Germany. They recorded their biggest win at the 2022–23 Rugby Europe Women's Trophy when they defeated Belgium 71–5. They jumped up 19 places to 30th after their record win over Belgium. They also went on to win the Trophy competition and earned a promotion to the 2024 Rugby Europe Women's Championship.

In 2023, they played Brazil in a two-test series in São Paulo. They lost the first match, as the hosts recorded their first test win, but fought back to win the second test to end the series with a draw.

== Record ==
=== Overall ===
Below is a table of the representative rugby matches played by a Portugal women’s national XV at test level up until 29 March 2026, updated after match with Netherlands.

Rugby: Portugal internationals 1995-
Opponent	First Game	Played	Won	Drawn	Lost	% Won
Belgium	2021	2	2	0	0	100%
Brazil	2023	3	1	0	2	33.33%
Czech Republic	2023	1	1	0	0	100%
Finland	2023	1	1	0	0	100%
Germany	1995	3	2	0	1	66.67%
Netherlands	2024	3	0	0	3	0%
Spain	2024	2	0	0	2	0%
Sweden	2022	3	2	0	1	66.67%
Summary	1995	18	9	0	9	50%

== Players ==
Squad for two-test series against Brazil:

Players	Position
Elsa Santos	Front Row
Inês Marques	Front Row
Beatriz Rodrigues	Front Row
Carlota Torres	Front Row
Maria Teixeira	Front Row
Claire Sanchez	Front Row
Sara Fernandes	Front Row
Ana Freire	Second Row
Maria Morant	Second Row
Mario Mazer	Second Row
Arlete Gonçalves	Second Row
Laura Pereira	Back Row
Arlete Gonçalves	Back Row
Ana Fernandes	Forward
Maria Morant	Forward
Inês Barbosa	Forward
Sara Oliveira	Back Row
Leonor Amaral	Scrum-half
Beatriz Oliveira	Fly-half
Maria João Costa	Centre
Mariana Marques	Centre
Antónia Martins	Wing
Inês Spínola	Wing
Daniela Correira	Fullback
Ana Santos	Back
Chloe Costa	Back
Mariana Santos	Back
Marta Pedro	Back
Antónia Martins	Back
