= Jyväskylä RC =

- Full name: Jyväskylä Rugby Club
- Nickname(s): JRC
- Founded: 2001
- Location: Jyväskylä, Finland
- Chairman: Jouni Raninen
- Coach(es): Men: Henri Tyrväinen
- Captain(s): Men: Ari Tikkanen (since 2011); Women: Niina Tikkanen (since 2011)
- League(s): Finnish Championship (men & women)
Team kit

Jyväskylä RC is a Finnish rugby club in Jyväskylä.

== History ==
The club was founded in 2001. Ladies team since 2005.
