= Eagles RFC =

- Full name: Eagles Rugby Football Club
- Founded: 2002
- Location: Turku, Finland
- Ground: Impivaara Nurmikentta
- Chairman: Bernt Lindell
- Coach(es): Alastair Davies, Thape Dlamini.
- Captain(s): Philip Sleath & Tatu Rantakokko, Emma Virtanen & Kaisa Lappi
Team kit

Eagles RFC is a Finnish rugby club in Turku.
