= Tallinna Kalev RFC =

Estonian rugby union club

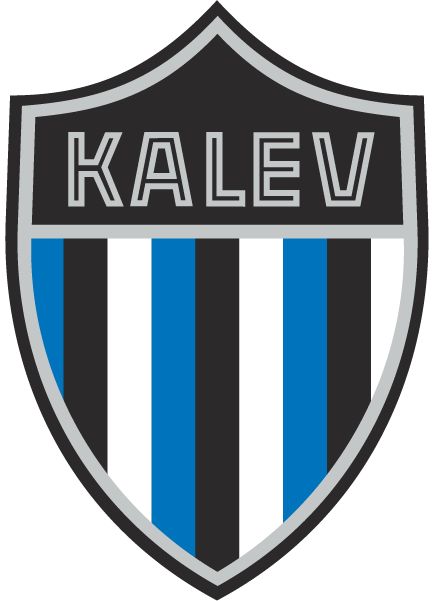
- Nickname: KALEV
- Founded: 2006 (as Tallinn Sharks RFC)
- Location: Tallinn, Estonia
- Coach: Taavi Ermel
- Captain: Taavi Ermel
Team kit

Official website
- www.kalevrfc.ee

Tallinna Kalev RFC is an Estonian rugby club in Tallinn.

== History ==
The club was founded in 2006 as Tallinn Sharks RFC and changed their name to Tallinna Kalev RFC in 2013, and hey joined. Sports federation and renamed to Talinna Kalev RFC. In 2017 Kalev RFC joined the Finnish Rugby Federation (SRL) and played in the 1st Division league, topping the regular season table and winning the grand final against Tampere Rugby Club. It was the first time Kalec RFC had the opportunity to participate in high-level league. In 2018 Kalev RFC was promoted into the SRL Championship League, coming third in the regular season and losing to Helsinki Rugby Club in the semi-finals.
