= Tampere RC =

Finnish rugby club

- Full name: Tampere Rugby Club
- Location: Tampere, Finland
- Ground(s): Raholan Urheilukenttä
- Chairman: Luca Seale
- Coach(es): Petri Sallansalo
- Captain(s): Ilari Kampman
- League(s): 1st Division
Team kit

Tampere RC is a Finnish rugby club in Tampere.
