= RC Bystrc =

Czech rugby union club, based in Brno

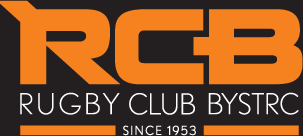
- Full name: Rugby Club Bystrc
- Founded: 1953; 73 years ago
- Location: Brno, Czech Republic
- Ground: Sportovní areá Ondreje Sekory
- President: (Czech Republic) Pavel Holeček
- Coach: (Czech Republic) Pavel Vrána (player-coach)
- League: 1. Liga ragby XV
Team kit

RC Bystrc is a Czech rugby union club in Brno. As the name implies, they are based in the Bystrc district of the city. They currently play in the 1. Liga ragby XV, having won the 1. Liga ragby XV in 2008.2010.2012

== History ==
Rugby in the then Czechoslovakia was much affected following the nationwide restructuring of Physical Education and Sport in 1953. The Sokol Zbrojovka Brno club split in two, Spartak Zbrojovka Brno (now Dragon Brno) and Slavia VŠ Brno.

The club played in the Řečkovice, Pisárky, Tuřany, and Kníničky areas of Brno as well as the town of Šlapanice and the village of Troubsko, before finally managing to secure their present home ground, the Sportovní areá Ondreje Sekory, at Bystrc.

== Honours ==
- První KB Liga
  - 2008

== Historical names ==
- 1953 - 1959 Slavia VŠ Brno
- 1960 - 1975 Slavia VSŽ Brno
- 1976–1981 Ingstav Brno
- 1982–1999 Lokomotiva-Ingstav Brno
- 2000 – RC Bystrc

== Team management ==
- Head Coach: Pavel Vrána
- Assistant Coach: Roman Bačík
- Conditioning Coach: Karel Walter
