= Finland women's national rugby union team =

Finland
- Union: Suomen Rugbyliitto
- Head coach: Leonardo Fierro
- Captain: Venla Lehtonen
- Most caps: Anna Soiluva (24)
- Top scorer: Anna Soiluva (106)
- Top try scorer: Anna Soiluva (11)
| First colours | Second colours |

World Rugby ranking
- Current: 35 (as of 23 March 2026)
- Highest: 30 (2024)
- Lowest: 50 (2022)

First international
- Finland 12-12 Norway (Brussels, Belgium 11 April 2007)

Biggest win
- Finland 80-0 Switzerland (Porvoo, Finland 28 May 2022)

Biggest defeat
- Spain 119-0 Finland (Galicia, Spain 30 April 2011)

The Finland women's national rugby union team represents Finland internationally in rugby union. They made their international debut in 2007.

== History ==
The women's national team was created in 2006 and the team competed in the Stockholm 10's tournament in 2006. Finland started to build a national 15-team for the 2007 Women's European Championships in Belgium, which saw the Finnish team end up in fifth place after defeating Luxembourg in the 5th/6th place final.

Finland's 3–0 victory over Czechia at the 2022–23 Rugby Europe Women's Trophy saw them move five places higher in the rankings.

== Results summary ==
(Full internationals only)

| Opponent | Played | Won | Drawn | Lost | % Win |
|---|---|---|---|---|---|
| Germany | 4 | 1 | 0 | 3 | 25.0% |
| Luxembourg | 1 | 1 | 0 | 0 | 100.00% |
| Netherlands | 1 | 0 | 0 | 1 | 0.00% |
| Belgium | 1 | 0 | 0 | 1 | 0.00% |
| Norway | 2 | 1 | 1 | 0 | 50.00% |
| Portugal | 1 | 0 | 0 | 1 | 0.00% |
| Romania | 2 | 0 | 0 | 2 | 0.00% |
| Russia | 3 | 0 | 0 | 3 | 0.00% |
| Spain | 1 | 0 | 0 | 1 | 0.00% |
| Sweden | 4 | 0 | 0 | 4 | 0.00% |
| Switzerland | 5 | 1 | 0 | 4 | 20.0% |
| Czech Republic | 4 | 1 | 1 | 2 | 25.0% |
| Latvia | 2 | 2 | 0 | 0 | 100.0% |
| Total | 31 | 7 | 2 | 21 | 22.6% |

== Players ==
=== Current squad ===
This is the list of players that composed the training squad in Fall 2024.

- Caps updated as of 30 October 2024

| Player | Position | Caps | Club/Province |
|---|---|---|---|
| Sarianna Haavisto | Hooker | 15 | Tampere RC |
| Reetta Jokinen | Hooker | 4 | Warriors RC |
| Liisa Lemettilä | Prop | 7 | Helsinki RC |
| Ulla Tuomainen | Lock | 21 | Helsinki RC |
| Hanna Visuri (C) | Lock | 14 | Tampere RC |
| Sofia Lalli | Flanker | 3 | Helsinki RC |
| Lilli Tikkanen | Flanker | 6 | Warriors RC |
| Milla Ryhtä | Hooker | 3 | Tampere RC |
| Anna Soiluva | Number 8 | 20 | Tampere RC |
| Hanna Poole | Wing | 3 | Saimaa Sharks RC |
| Jenna Koivumäki | Fly half | 6 | Helsinki RC |
| Heidi Hennessy (VC) | Centre | 8 | Helsinki RC |
| Saara Kukkurainen | Flanker | 5 | Saimaa Sharks RC |
| Emmi Ovaskainen | Utility back | 4 | Helsinki RC |
| Mira Leppälä | Lock | 2 | Helsinki RC |
| Pilvi Dahl | Fly half | 1 | Tampere RC |
| Kaisa Kemppinen | Wing | 2 | Helsinki RC |
| Kaisla Kainulainen | Flanker | 1 | Tampere RC |
| Elisa Salonen | Prop | 12 | Tampere RC |
| Essi Kara | Flanker | 6 | Helsinki RC |
| Venla Lehtonen | Scrum half | 9 | Saimaa Sharks RC |
| Elisa Korhonen | Scrum half | 2 | Oulu RC |
| Sabina Wright-Pannuzzo | Flanker | 1 | Helsinki RC |
| Johanna Leino | Prop | 2 | Warriors RC |
| Kiira Kupiainen | Wing | 5 | Tampere RC |
| Jasmi Latvala | Utility back | 2 | Helsinki RC |
| Susanna Haavisto | Lock | 10 | Tampere RC |
| Jenni Mäkirinta | Wing | 10 | Tampere RC |
| Pinja Pennanen | Prop | 5 | Karjala RC |
| Oona Tolppanen | Fullback | 4 | Helsinki RC |
| Sonja Jurmu | Hooker | 4 | Warriors RC |

== Coaching staff ==
- Head Coach: Leonardo Fierro
- Defense Coach: Ric Hennessy
- Assistant Coach: Riccardo Notarangelo
- Physio: Riikka Nortia
- Team Manager: Emmanuel Courbin

== See also ==
- Rugby union in Finland
