= Czech Republic women's national rugby union team =

National women's rugby team of the Czech Republic

Czechia
- Union: Czech Rugby Union
First colours

World Rugby ranking
- Current: 44 (as of 2 March 2026)
- Highest: 31 (2023)
- Lowest: 48 (2024)

First international
- Czech Republic 5–5 Austria (Vienna, Austria 5 June 2004)

Biggest win
- Czech Republic 40–0 Eastern Germany (Prague, Czech Republic 8 November 2009)

Biggest defeat
- Spain 97–0 Czech Republic (Madrid, Spain 9 October 2016)

The Czech Republic women's national rugby union team is a sports side that represents the Czech Republic in women's international rugby union. They played their first international game in 2004.

== History ==
At the 2022–23 Rugby Europe Women's Trophy, Czechia climbed to their highest ranking of 31st from 44th after defeating Belgium 29–21. A 51–0 loss to Portugal saw them drop four places, and a narrow 3–0 loss to Finland saw them fall eight more places in rankings to 43rd.

== Results summary ==
(Full internationals only)

Rugby: Czech Republic internationals 2004–
Opponent	First game	Played	Won	Drawn	Lost	Percentage
Austria	2004	2	0	2	0	0.00%
Belgium	2015	3	1	0	2	33.33%
Finland	2019	4	2	1	1	50%
Germany	2018	2	0	0	2	0.00%
Poland	2026	1	1	0	0	100%
Portugal	2023	1	0	0	1	0.00%
Russia	2015	1	0	0	1	0.00%
Spain	2016	1	0	0	1	0.00%
Sweden	2019	2	1	0	1	50%
Switzerland	2013	7	3	0	4	42.85%
Summary	2004	23	7	3	13	30.43%

== See also ==
- Rugby union in the Czech Republic
