= List of Uganda women's national rugby union team matches =

The following is a list of Uganda women's national rugby union team international matches.

== Overall ==
See Women's international rugby for information about the status of international games and match numbering

Uganda's overall international match record against all nations, updated to 15 June 2025, is as follows:

	Played	Won	Drawn	Lost	Win %
Total	41	17	3	21	41.46%

== Full internationals ==
=== Legend ===
Won	Lost	Draw

=== 2000s ===
Test	Date	Opponent	PF	PA	Venue	Event	Ref
1	2005-02-26	Rwanda	92	0	Amahoro Stadium, Kigali	Test	
2	2005-12-10	Rwanda	81	0	Kyadondo Rugby Club, Kampala	Test	
3	2006-06-09	Kenya	24	0	Kampala	2006 Elgon Cup	
4	2006-08-12	Kenya	3	0	Nairobi	2006 Elgon Cup	
5	2008-05-24	Kenya	18	7	Kampala	2008 Elgon Cup	
6	2008-08-16	Kenya	13	15	Nairobi	2008 Elgon Cup	
7	2009-08-15	Kenya	5	38	RFUEA Ground, Nairobi	2009 Elgon Cup	
8	2009-08-29	Kenya	12	5	Kampala RC, Kampala	2009 Elgon Cup	

=== 2010s ===
Test	Date	Opponent	PF	PA	Venue	Event	Ref
9	2010-05-08	Kenya	10	10	Kampala RC, Kampala	Test	
10	2010-05-22	Kenya	0	8	Impala Ground, Nairobi	Test	
11	2010-07-03	Kenya	8	5	Kyadondo Rugby Club, Kampala	2010 Elgon Cup	
12	2010-07-10	Kenya	8	16	RFUEA Ground, Nairobi	2010 Elgon Cup	
13	2011-07-09	Kenya	10	22	RFUEA Ground, Nairobi	2011 Elgon Cup	
14	2011-07-16	Kenya	29	10	Kyadondo Rugby Club, Kampala	2011 Elgon Cup	
15	2012-04-21	Kenya	15	6	Kampala RC, Kampala	2012 Elgon Cup	
16	2012-04-28	Kenya	3	15	RFUEA Ground, Nairobi	2012 Elgon Cup	
17	2013-06-15	Kenya	17	18	Moi International Sports Centre, Nairobi	2013 Elgon Cup	
18	2013-06-22	Kenya	13	8	Kyadondo Rugby Club, Kampala	2013 Elgon Cup	
19	2013-09-07	South Africa	3	63	East London	2014 RWC Qualifier	
20	2014-07-12	Kenya	15	33	Kyadondo Rugby Club, Kampala	2014 Elgon Cup	
21	2014-07-19	Kenya	10	39	RFUEA Ground, Nairobi	2014 Elgon Cup	
22	2015-06-13	Kenya	5	5	RFUEA Ground, Nairobi	2015 Elgon Cup	
23	2015-06-20	Kenya	6	7	Legends Rugby Grounds, Kampala	2015 Elgon Cup	
24	2019-06-22	Kenya	13	44	Jomo Kenyatta Stadium, Kisumu	2019 Elgon Cup	
25	2019-07-13	Kenya	5	35	Kyadondo Rugby Club, Kampala	2019 Elgon Cup	
26	2019-08-09	South Africa	7	89	Bosman Stadium, Brakpan	2019 Africa Cup	
27	2019-08-13	Kenya	5	37	Bosman Stadium, Brakpan	2019 Africa Cup	

=== 2020s ===
Test	Date	Opponent	PF	PA	Venue	Event	Ref
28	2019-08-17	Madagascar	15	15	Bosman Stadium, Brakpan	2019 Africa Cup	
29	2021-07-14	Zimbabwe	41	0	Kyadondo Rugby Club, Kampala	2021 Africa Cup	
30	2021-07-18	Zimbabwe	34	3	Kyadondo Rugby Club, Kampala	2021 Africa Cup	
31	2022-10-25	Zambia	36	17	Muteesa II Wankulukuku Stadium	2022 Africa Cup	
32	2022-11-02	Kenya	3	23	Muteesa II Wankulukuku Stadium	2022 Africa Cup	
33	2023-11-11	Kenya	3	87	Jomo Kenyatta Stadium, Kisumu	2023 Elgon Cup	
34	2023-11-22	Tunisia	17	26	Stade El Menzah, Tunis		
35	2023-11-27	Tunisia	13	53	Stade El Menzah, Tunis		
36	2025-04-11	Tunisia	27	10	Stade Auguste-Denis, San-Pédro	2025 RAC Div 1	
37	2025-04-15	Ivory Coast	52	0	Stade Auguste-Denis, San-Pédro	2025 RAC Div 1	
38	2025-04-19	Zimbabwe	63	7	Stade Auguste-Denis, San-Pédro	2025 RAC Div 1	
39	2025-06-07	South Africa	7	62	Stade Makis, Antananarivo	2025 Africa Cup	
40	2025-06-11	Madagascar	24	20	Stade Makis, Antananarivo	2025 Africa Cup	
41	2025-06-15	Kenya	0	47	Stade Makis, Antananarivo	2025 Africa Cup	
42	2026-05-23	Kenya	10	43	RFUEA Ground, Nairobi	Rugby Africa Women's Cup	
43	2026-05-27	Madagascar	46	12	RFUEA Ground, Nairobi	Rugby Africa Women's Cup	
44	2026-05-31	South Africa	20	35	RFUEA Ground, Nairobi	Rugby Africa Women's Cup	

== Other matches ==
Date	Uganda	Score	Opponent	Venue	Ref
2004-12-04	Uganda XV	183–0	Rwanda XV	Kampala	
2005-08-13	Ugandan Select XV	58–0	Kenyan Barbarians	Kampala	
