= List of Madagascar women's national rugby union team matches =

The following is a list of Madagascar women's national rugby union team matches.

== Overall ==
Madagascar's overall international match record against all nations, updated to 15 June 2025, is as follows:

	Games Played	Won	Drawn	Lost	Percentage of wins
Total	19	7	1	11	36.84%

== Full Internationals ==
=== Legend ===
Won	Lost	Draw

=== 2019 ===
Test	Date	Opponent	PF	PA	Venue	Event	Ref
1	9 August 2019	Kenya	5	35	Bosman Stadium, Brakpan	2019 Africa Cup	
2	13 August 2019	South Africa	0	73	Bosman Stadium, Brakpan	2019 Africa Cup	
3	17 August 2019	Uganda	15	15	Bosman Stadium, Brakpan	2019 Africa Cup	

=== 2021–2023 ===
Test	Date	Opponent	PF	PA	Venue	Event	Ref
4	3 July 2021	Kenya	27	15	Nyayo National Stadium, Nairobi	2021 Africa Cup	
5	11 July 2021	Kenya	10	0	Nyayo National Stadium, Nairobi	2021 Africa Cup	
6	18 October 2022	Senegal	34	25	Stade El Menzah, Tunis	2022 Africa Cup	
7	22 October 2022	Tunisia	27	5	Stade El Menzah, Tunis	2022 Africa Cup	
8	20 May 2023	Kenya	20	29	Stade Makis, Antananarivo	2023 Africa Cup	
9	24 May 2023	Cameroon	30	10	Stade Makis, Antananarivo	2023 Africa Cup	

=== 2024 ===
Test	Date	Opponent	PF	PA	Venue	Event	Ref
10	4 May 2024	Kenya	29	22	Stade Makis, Antananarivo	2024 Africa Cup	
11	8 May 2024	Cameroon	12	5	Stade Makis, Antananarivo	2024 Africa Cup	
12	12 May 2024	South Africa	17	46	Stade Makis, Antananarivo	2024 Africa Cup	
13	20 September 2024	Kenya	19	63	RFUEA Ground, Nairobi	Test	
14	27 September 2024	Spain	0	83	The Sevens Stadium, Dubai	2024 WXV 3	
15	4 October 2024	Hong Kong	7	38	The Sevens Stadium, Dubai	2024 WXV 3	
16	11 October 2024	Samoa	15	46	The Sevens Stadium, Dubai	2024 WXV 3	

=== 2025 ===
Test	Date	Opponent	PF	PA	Venue	Event	Ref
17	7 June 2025	Kenya	5	25	Stade Makis, Antananarivo	2025 Africa Cup	
18	11 June 2025	Uganda	20	24	Stade Makis, Antananarivo	2025 Africa Cup	
19	15 June 2025	South Africa	17	61	Stade Makis, Antananarivo	2025 Africa Cup	

=== 2026 ===
Test	Date	Opponent	PF	PA	Venue	Event	Ref
20	23 May 2026	South Africa	5	64	RFUEA Ground, Nairobi	Rugby Africa Women's Cup	
21	27 May 2026	Kenya	0	50	RFUEA Ground, Nairobi	Rugby Africa Women's Cup	
22	31 May 2026	Uganda	12	46	RFUEA Ground, Nairobi	Rugby Africa Women's Cup	
