= List of South Africa women's national rugby union team matches =

The following is a list of South Africa women's national rugby union team international matches. It includes both formally recognised test matches (result counts for the international ranking of World Rugby) as other matches. The international ranking can be found on the website of World Rugby.

== International tests and other matches ==
Statistics and lineups of all matches from November 2018 can be found on the SARU website.

== Test matches ==
Won	Lost	Draw

=== 2000s ===
Test	Date	Opponent	PF	PA	Venue	Event
1	29 May 2004	Wales	5	8	Adcock Stadium, Port Elizabeth	
2	5 June 2004	Wales	15	16	Loftus Versfeld Stadium, Pretoria	
3	26 April 2005	Wales	9	24	Ebbw Vale	
4	14 May 2005	England	0	101	Imber Court, London	
5	17 June 2006	Netherlands	35	0	Port Elizabeth	
6	24 June 2006	Netherlands	42	12	Durban	
7	31 August 2006	Australia	12	68	Ellerslie Rugby Park, Edmonton	2006 World Cup
8	4 September 2006	England	8	74	Ellerslie Rugby Park, Edmonton	2006 World Cup
9	8 September 2006	Ireland	0	37	Ellerslie Rugby Park, Edmonton	2006 World Cup
10	12 September 2006	Samoa	10	43	Ellerslie Rugby Park, Edmonton	2006 World Cup
11	16 September 2006	Kazakhstan	0	36	Ellerslie Rugby Park, Edmonton	2006 World Cup
12	10 August 2009	France	17	17	Oakville	2009 Nations Cup
13	13 August 2009	Canada	17	35	Oakville	2009 Nations Cup
14	16 August 2009	United States	0	39	Oakville	2009 Nations Cup
15	19 August 2009	England	0	25	Oakville	2009 Nations Cup

=== 2010s ===
Test	Date	Opponent	PF	PA	Venue	Event
16	8 April 2010	Kazakhstan	22	17	Al Ain, Dubai	
17	10 April 2010	Kazakhstan	38	0	Al Ain, Dubai	
18	5 June 2010	Scotland	27	8	Lasswade	
19	12 June 2010	Scotland	41	17	Lasswade	
20	20 August 2010	New Zealand	3	55	Surrey Sports Park, Guildford	2010 World Cup
21	24 August 2010	Wales	15	10	Surrey Sports Park, Guildford	2010 World Cup
22	28 August 2010	Australia	0	62	Surrey Sports Park, Guildford	2010 World Cup
23	1 September 2010	Kazakhstan	25	10	Surrey Sports Park, Guildford	2010 World Cup
24	5 September 2010	Wales	17	29	Surrey Sports Park, Guildford	2010 World Cup
25	2 August 2011	Canada	17	52	Oakville	2010 Nations Cup
26	5 August 2011	England	8	46	Chatham-Kent	2010 Nations Cup
27	9 August 2011	United States	26	23	Oakville	2010 Nations Cup
28	13 August 2011	United States	9	29	Oakville	2011 Nations Cup
29	30 July 2013	United States	22	32	University of Northern Colorado, Greeley	2013 Nations Cup
30	4 August 2013	England	17	18	University of Northern Colorado, Greeley	2013 Nations Cup
31	7 August 2013	Canada	15	53	University of Northern Colorado, Greeley	2013 Nations Cup
32	10 August 2013	United States	5	61	Infinity Park, Glendale	2013 Nations Cup
33	7 September 2013	Uganda	63	3	East London, Eastern Cape	
34	4 July 2014	France	8	46	CNR, Marcoussis	
35	1 August 2014	Australia	3	26	CNR, Marcoussis	2014 World Cup
36	5 August 2014	France	3	55	CNR, Marcoussis	2014 World Cup
37	9 August 2014	Wales	3	35	CNR, Marcoussis	2014 World Cup
38	13 August 2014	Samoa	25	24	CNR, Marcoussis	2014 World Cup
39	17 August 2014	Spain	0	36	CNR, Marcoussis	2014 World Cup
40	10 November 2018	Wales	5	19	Cardiff Arms Park, Cardiff	
41	17 November 2018	Spain	5	17	Villajoyosa	
41	25 November 2018	Italy	10	35	Prato	
42	9 August 2019	Uganda	89	7	Bosman Stadium, Brakpan	2019 Africa Cup
43	13 August 2019	Madagascar	73	0	Bosman Stadium, Brakpan	2019 Africa Cup
44	17 August 2019	Kenya	39	0	Bosman Stadium, Brakpan	2019 Africa Cup
45	21 September 2019	Spain	12	29	WJ De Wet Stadium, Despatch	
46	30 September 2019	Scotland	5	47	City Park, Cape Town	
47	5 October 2019	Scotland	15	38	City Park, Cape Town	

=== 2020s ===
Test	Date	Opponent	PF	PA	Venue	Event
48	12 August 2021	Kenya	66	0	Danie Craven Stadium, Stellenbosch	
49	16 August 2021	Kenya	29	22	Danie Craven Stadium, Stellenbosch	
50	6 November 2021	France	3	46	Stade de la Rabine, Vannes	
51	13 November 2021	Wales	19	29	Cardiff Arms Park, Cardiff	
52	15 June 2022	Zimbabwe	108	0	Athlone Stadium, Cape Town	2022 Africa Cup
53	23 June 2022	Namibia	128	3	Athlone Stadium, Cape Town	2022 Africa Cup
54	24 July 2022	Japan	6	15	Kamaishi Recovery Memorial Stadium, Kamaishi	
55	30 July 2022	Japan	20	10	Kumagaya Rugby Stadium, Saitama	
56	13 August 2022	Spain	44	5	Ellis Park Stadium, Johannesburg	
57	19 August 2022	Spain	37	14	Fanie du Toit Stadium, Pothefstroom	
58	8 October 2022	France	5	40	Eden Park, Auckland	2021 World Cup
59	16 October 2022	Fiji	17	21	The Trusts Arena, Auckland	2021 World Cup
60	23 October 2022	England	0	75	The Trusts Arena, Auckland	2021 World Cup
61	25 March 2023	Canada	7	66	Estadio Nacional Complutense, Madrid	
62	1 April 2023	Spain	35	20	Estadio Nacional Complutense, Madrid	
63	20 May 2023	Cameroon	87	0	Stade Makis, Antananarivo	2023 Africa Cup
64	24 May 2023	Kenya	48	0	Stade Makis, Antananarivo	2023 Africa Cup
65	16 September 2023	Kenya	77	12	University of the Western Cape Stadium, Cape Town	
66	13 October 2023	Scotland	17	31	Danie Craven Stadium, Stellenbosch	2023 WXV 2
67	20 October 2023	Italy	18	36	Athlone Stadium, Cape Town	2023 WXV 2
68	27 October 2023	Samoa	33	7	Athlone Stadium, Cape Town	2023 WXV 2
69	23 March 2024	Spain	15	13	Estadio Pepe Rojo, Valladolid	
70	30 March 2024	United States	17	38	Trailfinders Sports Ground, London, England	
71	4 May 2024	Cameroon	55	0	Stade Makis, Antananarivo	2024 Africa Cup
72	8 May 2024	Kenya	63	5	Stade Makis, Antananarivo	2024 Africa Cup
73	12 May 2024	Madagascar	46	17	Stade Makis, Antananarivo	2024 Africa Cup
74	19 September 2024	Spain	36	19	DHL Stadium, Cape Town	
75	27 September 2024	Japan	34	21	DHL Stadium, Cape Town	2024 WXV 2
76	5 October 2024	Australia	26	33	Athlone Stadium, Cape Town	2024 WXV 2
77	12 October 2024	Italy	19	23	Athlone Stadium, Cape Town	2024 WXV 2
78	19 April 2025	Spain	48	26	Campo de Rugby Amorós Palao, Alicante	Test
79	7 June 2025	Uganda	62	7	Stade Makis, Antananarivo	2025 Africa Cup
80	11 June 2025	Kenya	19	12	Stade Makis, Antananarivo	2025 Africa Cup
81	15 June 2025	Madagascar	61	17	Stade Makis, Antananarivo	2025 Africa Cup
82	5 July 2025	Canada	20	50	Loftus Versfeld Stadium, Pretoria	2025 World Cup Warm-Ups
83	12 July 2025	Canada	5	33	Nelson Mandela Bay Stadium, Gqeberha	2025 World Cup Warm-Ups
84	24 August 2025	Brazil	66	6	Franklin's Gardens, Northampton	2025 World Cup
85	31 August 2025	Italy	29	24	York Community Stadium, York	2025 World Cup
86	7 September 2025	France	10	57	Franklin's Gardens, Northampton	2025 World Cup
87	13 September 2025	New Zealand	17	46	Sandy Park, Exeter	2025 World Cup

==== 2026 ====
Test	Date	Opponent	PF	PA	Venue	Event
88	23 May 2026	Madagascar	64	5	RFUEA Ground, Nairobi	Rugby Africa Women's Cup
89	27 May 2026	Uganda	47	20	RFUEA Ground, Nairobi	Rugby Africa Women's Cup
90	31 May 2026	Kenya	35	20	RFUEA Ground, Nairobi	Rugby Africa Women's Cup
91	4 July 2026	United States	34	21	Ellis Park Stadium, Johannesburg	Test
'92	11 July 2026	United States	19	26	Loftus Versfeld Stadium, Pretoria	Test
93	8 August 2026	Fiji	55	12	HFC Bank Stadium, Suva	Test
94	15 August 2026	Fiji	29	22	Churchill Park, Lautoka	Test
95	19 September 2026	Wales	19	50	Cardiff Arms Park, Cardiff	2026 WXV Global Series
96	26 September 2026	Italy	41	29	Stadio Omero Tognon, Fontanafredda	2026 WXV Global Series
97	4 October 2026	Spain	TBA	TBA	Instalaciones deportivas La Cartuja, Seville	2026 WXV Global Series
98	24 October 2026	Ireland	TBA	TBA	Athlone Stadium, Cape Town	2026 WXV Global Series
99	31 October 2026	Ireland	TBA	TBA	Athlone Stadium, Cape Town	2026 WXV Global Series

== Other matches ==
Date	South Africa	PF	PA	Opponent	Venue	Ref
31 May 2003	South Africa President's XV	0	45	England Development	Pongola	
26 April 2005	South Africa	17	10	Wales A	UWIC, Cardiff	
3 May 2005	South Africa	31	5	England Students	Aylesbury	
7 May 2005	South Africa	12	42	England A	Old Albanians, St Albans	
10 May 2005	South Africa	19	25	England Academy	Old Albanians, St Albans	
June 2006	South Africa	5	3	Irish Barbarians	Durban	
21 June 2008	South Africa U20	23	12	United States U20	Nelspruit	
28 June 2008	South Africa U20	17	21	United States U20	Nelspruit	
9 August 2008	South Africa	34	40	Nomads	Ellis Park	
16 August 2008	South Africa	0	29	Nomads	Newlands	
23 June 2012	South Africa	28	17	Nomads	Cape Town	
30 June 2012	South Africa	17	15	Nomads	Goodwood RFC, Cape Town	
28 June 2014	South Africa	20	5	Nomads	Teddington, Middlesex	
1 July 2014	South Africa	32	24	Nomads	WASPS London	
14 October 2017	South Africa	27	5	British Army Women's XV	Aldershot	
18 October 2017	South Africa	12	47	England Academy	Aldershot	
22 October 2017	South Africa	15	12	England Academy	Aldershot	
2 November 2018	South Africa	31	12	UK Armed Forces W	Rosslyn Park	
21 November 2021	South Africa	38	5	England U20	London Irish Club, Surrey	
27 November 2021	South Africa	5	60	Barbarians Women	Twickenham Stadium, London	
12 April 2025	South Africa	50	17	England U20	Marcoussis, France	
26 July 2025	South Africa	26	34	Black Ferns XV	Athlone Stadium, Cape Town	
2 August 2025	South Africa	41	24	Black Ferns XV	Athlone Stadium, Cape Town	
17 June 2026	South Africa U20	12	47	United States U20	Paul Roos Markötter, Stellenbosch	
24 June 2024	South Africa U20	17	60	United States U20	Paul Roos Markötter, Stellenbosch	
