= List of Kenya women's national rugby union team matches =

The following is a list of Kenya women's national rugby union team matches.

== Overall ==
Kenya's overall international match record against all nations, updated to 15 June 2025, is as follows:

	Games Played	Won	Drawn	Lost	Percentage of wins
Total	45	22	2	21	48.89%

== Full internationals ==
=== Legend ===
Won	Lost	Draw

=== 2000s ===
Test	Date	Opponent	PF	PA	Venue	Tournament
1	13 May 2006	Uganda	0	24	Nairobi	Elgon Cup
2	12 August 2006	Uganda	0	3	Kampala	Elgon Cup
3	24 May 2008	Uganda	7	18	Kampala	Elgon Cup
4	16 August 2008	Uganda	15	13	Nairobi	Elgon Cup
5	15 August 2009	Uganda	38	5	Nairobi	Elgon Cup
6	29 August 2009	Uganda	5	12	Kampala	Elgon Cup

=== 2010s ===
Test	Date	Opponent	PF	PA	Venue	Tournament
7	8 May 2010	Uganda	10	10	Kampala	
8	3 July 2010	Uganda	5	8	Kampala	Elgon Cup
9	10 July 2010	Uganda	16	8	Nairobi	Elgon Cup
10	9 July 2011	Uganda	22	10	Nairobi	Elgon Cup
11	16 July 2011	Uganda	10	29	Kampala	Elgon Cup
12	21 April 2012	Uganda	6	15	Kyadondo Rugby Club, Kampala	Elgon Cup
13	28 April 2012	Uganda	15	3	RFUEA Ground, Nairobi	Elgon Cup
14	15 June 2013	Uganda	18	17	Moi Sports Centre, Nairobi	Elgon Cup
15	22 June 2013	Uganda	8	13	Kyadondo Rugby Club, Kampala	Elgon Cup
16	12 July 2014	Uganda	33	15	Kyadondo Rugby Club, Kampala	Elgon Cup
17	19 July 2014	Uganda	39	10	RFUEA Ground, Nairobi	Elgon Cup
18	13 June 2015	Uganda	5	5	RFUEA Ground, Nairobi	Elgon Cup
19	20 June 2015	Uganda	7	6	Legends Ground, Kampala	Elgon Cup
20	22 June 2019	Uganda	42	18	Mamboleo Showground, Kisumu	Elgon Cup
21	13 July 2019	Uganda	35	5	Kyadondo Rugby Club, Kampala	Elgon Cup
22	9 August 2019	Madagascar	35	5	Bosman Stadium, Brakpan	RAC
23	13 August 2019	Uganda	37	5	Bosman Stadium, Brakpan	RAC
24	17 August 2019	South Africa	0	30	Bosman Stadium, Brakpan	RAC

=== 2020s ===
Test	Date	Opponent	PF	PA	Venue	Tournament
25	3 July 2021	Madagascar	15	27	Nyayo National Stadium, Nairobi	
26	11 July 2021	Madagascar	0	10	Nyayo National Stadium, Nairobi	
27	12 August 2021	South Africa	0	66	Danie Craven Stadium, Stellenbosch	
28	16 August 2021	South Africa	22	29	Danie Craven Stadium, Stellenbosch	
29	25 August 2021	Colombia	15	16	Nyayo National Stadium, Nairobi	RWCQ
30	29 October 2022	Zambia	36	17	Muteesa II Wankulukuku Stadium	RAC
31	2 November 2022	Uganda	23	3	Muteesa II Wankulukuku Stadium	RAC
32	20 May 2023	Madagascar	29	20	Stade Makis, Antananarivo	RAC
33	24 May 2023	South Africa	0	48	Stade Makis, Antananarivo	RAC
34	28 May 2023	Cameroon	52	3	Stade Makis, Antananarivo	RAC
35	16 September 2023	South Africa	12	77	University of the Western Cape Stadium, Cape Town	
36	14 October 2023	Spain	0	32	The Sevens Stadium, Dubai	2023 WXV 3
37	20 October 2023	Kazakhstan	12	18	The Sevens Stadium, Dubai	2023 WXV 3
38	27 October 2023	Colombia	21	5	The Sevens Stadium, Dubai	2023 WXV 3
39	4 May 2024	Madagascar	22	29	Stade Makis, Antananarivo	2024 RAC
40	8 May 2024	South Africa	5	63	Stade Makis, Antananarivo	2024 RAC
41	12 May 2024	Cameroon	39	17	Stade Makis, Antananarivo	2024 RAC
42	20 September 2024	Madagascar	63	19	RFUEA Ground, Nairobi	Test
43	7 June 2025	Madagascar	25	5	Stade Makis, Antananarivo	2025 RAC
44	11 June 2025	South Africa	12	19	Stade Makis, Antananarivo	2025 RAC
45	15 June 2025	Uganda	47	0	Stade Makis, Antananarivo	2025 RAC
46	23 May 2026	Uganda	43	10	RFUEA Ground, Nairobi	Rugby Africa Women's Cup
47	27 May 2026	Madagascar	57	0	RFUEA Ground, Nairobi	Rugby Africa Women's Cup
48	31 May 2026	South Africa	20	35	RFUEA Ground, Nairobi	Rugby Africa Women's Cup

== Other matches ==
Date	Kenya	Score	Opponent	Venue
13 August 2005	Kenyan Barbarians	0–58	Ugandan Select XV	Kampala
