= List of Zimbabwe women's national rugby union team matches =

The following is a list of Zimbabwe women's national rugby union team international matches.

== Overall ==
Zimbabwe's overall international match record against all nations, updated to 19 April 2025, is as follows:

	Games Played	Won	Drawn	Lost	Percentage of wins
Total	11	3	0	8	27.27%

== Full internationals ==
Won	Lost	Draw

=== 2007–2019 ===
Test	Date	Opponent	PF	PA	Venue	Event	Ref
1	22 September 2007	Zambia	0	28	Harare	Test	
2	22 July 2017	Botswana	10	5	Hartsfield Rugby Grounds, Bulawayo	Test	
3	13 July 2019	Zambia	18	19	Harare Sports Club, Harare	Test	
4	14 September 2019	Zambia	15	21	Chester Dean Arena, Lusaka	Test	

=== 2021–2025 ===
Test	Date	Opponent	PF	PA	Venue	Event	Ref
5	14 July 2021	Uganda	0	41	Kyadondo Rugby Club, Kampala	2021 Africa Cup	
6	18 July 2021	Uganda	3	34	Kyadondo Rugby Club, Kampala	2021 Africa Cup	
7	15 June 2022	South Africa	0	108	City Park, Cape Town	2022 Africa Cup	
8	19 June 2022	Namibia	72	0	City Park, Cape Town	2022 Africa Cup	
9	11 April 2025	Ivory Coast	46	8	Stade Auguste-Denis, San-Pédro	2025 RAC Div. 1	
10	15 April 2025	Tunisia	24	27	Stade Auguste-Denis, San-Pédro	2025 RAC Div. 1	
11	19 April 2025	Uganda	7	63	Stade Auguste-Denis, San-Pédro	2025 RAC Div. 1	

== Other matches ==
Date	Zimbabwe	PF	PA	Opponent	Venue	Ref
2017-05-27	Zimbabwe Sables	10	17	Botswana Vultures	Gaborone	
2017-06-03	Zimbabwe Sables	39	0	Zambia XV	Police Ground, Harare	
2018-07-11	Zimbabwe XV	18	19	Zambia XV	Mufulira	
2018-07-15	Zimbabwe XV	3	7	Zambia XV	Mufulira	
2021-06-02	Zimbabwe XV	22	31	Zambia XV	Harare	
2021-06-05	Zimbabwe XV	17	38	Zambia XV	Harare	
