= Rugby Africa Women's Cup =

Two-year women's rugby union tournament

- Current season or competition: 2026 Rugby Africa Women's Cup
- Sport: Rugby union
- Instituted: 2019; 7 years ago
- Governing body: Africa (Rugby Africa)
- Holders: South Africa (2025)
- Most titles: South Africa (4 titles)

The Rugby Africa Women's Cup is an international women's rugby union competition contested by women's national teams from Africa.

== History ==
Rugby Africa Women's Cup was initially launched in 2019. South Africa won the inaugural competition in Brakpan and also qualified for the 2021 Rugby World Cup in New Zealand.

The 2020 tournament was cancelled due to the effects of the COVID-19 pandemic in Africa. The 2021 tournament was replaced with a series of test matches.

In 2022, the competition consisted of twelve teams that were split into four pools, they played in a single round-robin where the winners qualified to the second phase of the tournament in 2023. South Africa, Kenya, Madagascar and Cameroon were the four teams to qualify after topping their respective pools.

In 2023, South Africa won their second title, and Kenya finished as runners-up. Both teams qualified for the inaugural WXV competition in October, with South Africa set to compete in WXV 2, and Kenya in WXV 3.

There was a Women's Division 1 tournament that was held at Stade Auguste-Denis in San-Pédro, Ivory Coast from 11 to 19 April 2025, which was a qualifier for the 2025 Rugby Africa Women's Cup.

== Summary ==
Year	Host	Final			Third place match		
Year	Host	Winner	Score	Runner-up	Third	Score	Fourth
2019	South Africa	South Africa	Round-robin	Kenya	Madagascar	Round-robin	Uganda
2020	Cancelled due to the COVID-19 pandemic in Africa						
2021	Series of test matches played						
2022	Qualifier for second phase of tournament in 2023						
2023	Madagascar	South Africa	Round-robin	Kenya	Madagascar	Round-robin	Cameroon
2024	Madagascar	South Africa	Round-robin	Madagascar	Kenya	Round-robin	Cameroon
2025	Madagascar	South Africa	Round-robin	Kenya	Uganda	Round-robin	Madagascar
2026	Kenya	South Africa	Round-robin	Kenya	Uganda	Round-robin	Madagascar

^n/a A round-robin tournament determined the final standings.

== Overall ==
The overall record of the teams are as follows:

Team	Champions	Runners-up	Third	Fourth
South Africa	5 (2019, 2023, 2024, 2025, 2026)	—N/a	—N/a	—N/a
Kenya	—N/a	4 (2019, 2023, 2025, 2026)	1 (2024)	—N/a
Madagascar	—N/a	1 (2024)	2 (2019, 2023)	2 (2025, 2026)
Uganda	—N/a	—N/a	2 (2025, 2026)	1 (2019)
Cameroon	—N/a	—N/a	—N/a	2 (2023, 2024)

== Lower level women's championships ==
=== Division 1 ===
Year	Host	Final			Third place match		
Year	Host	Winner	Score	Runner-up	Third	Score	Fourth
2025	Ivory Coast	Uganda	Round-robin	Tunisia	Zimbabwe	Round-robin	Ivory Coast
2026	Tunisia	Tunisia	Round-robin	Morocco	Ivory Coast	No playoff	

^n/a A round-robin tournament determined the final standings.

== See also ==
- Women's international rugby
- Rugby Africa Cup
