= 2022 Rugby Africa Women's Cup =

Tournament details
- Date: June 15, 2022–November 12, 2022
- Countries: Burkina Faso; Cameroon; Ivory Coast; Kenya; Madagascar; Namibia; Senegal; South Africa; Tunisia; Uganda; Zambia; Zimbabwe
- Teams: 12

Tournament statistics
- Matches played: 12

The 2022 Rugby Africa Women's Cup is the second edition of the Rugby Africa Women's Cup following the cancellation of the 2020 and 2021 editions due to COVID-19 related restrictions. The 12 teams are split in 4 pools that play a single round-robin where the winners classify to the second phase of the tournament. Pool A was played in June 2022 due to South Africa participation on the 2021 World Cup. The schedule for the other pools was announced by Rugby Africa on October 10, 2022.

The tournament reconvened on October 14 and concluded on November 12. South Africa, Kenya, Madagascar and Cameroon were the four teams to qualify after topping their respective pools.

== Pool Stage ==
=== Pool A ===
| Pos | Team | P | W | D | L | PF | PA | PD | BP | Pts |
|---|---|---|---|---|---|---|---|---|---|---|
| 1 | South Africa | 2 | 2 | 0 | 0 | 236 | 3 | +233 | 2 | 10 |
| 2 | Zimbabwe | 2 | 1 | 0 | 1 | 72 | 108 | -36 | 1 | 5 |
| 3 | Namibia | 2 | 0 | 0 | 2 | 3 | 200 | -197 | 0 | 0 |

| 2022-06-15 | (1 BP) South Africa | 108–0 | Zimbabwe | City Park, Cape Town |
| 15:00 SAST (UTC+2) | Try: Nomawethu Mabenge (3) 2' c, 36' m, 45' c Zintle Mpupha (2) 5' c, 25' c Lindelwa Gwala 9' c Ayanda Malinga (2) 15' m, 73' c Sizophila Solontsi (2) 20' m, 60' c Lusanda Dumke 33' m Sinazo Mcatshulwa 39' m Nadine Roos 42' m Tayla Kinsey 51' c Aphiwe Ngwevu (3) 57' m, 66' c, 70' c Con: Libbie Janse van Rensburg (4/9) 2', 5', 9', 25'; Zenay Jordaan (4/5) 61', 66', 71', 73'; Tayla Kinsey (2/3) 45', 51'; Pen: Tayla Kinsey 40' | | | Referee: Saudah Adiru (BWA) |

| 2022-06-19 | (1 BP) Zimbabwe | 72–0 | Namibia | City Park, Cape Town |
| 14:30 SAST (UTC+2) | Try: Chiwoniso Emelda Mabika (4) 1' c, 15' m, 23' m, 46' c Precious Chirinda (2) 21' m, 74' c Rumbidzai Chigumbu 29' c Ruvimbo Musere 36' m Pauline Sianga 55' m Robyn Mbembere (2) 57' c, 79' c Caroline Malenga 59' m Con: Precious Chirinda (5/11) 2', 30', 47', 58', 75'; Robyn Mbembere 80' | | Cards: Ndapanda Kakundi (yellow card) 11' to 21' | Referee: Aimee Barrett-Theron (RSA) |

| 2022-06-23 | (1 BP) South Africa | 128–3 | Namibia | City Park, Cape Town |
| 16:00 SAST (UTC+2) | Try: Aphiwe Ngwevu 1' c Libbie Janse van Rensburg (2) 5' c, 61' c Zintle Mpupha (4) 14' c, 19' c, 24' m, 41' m Sizophila Solontsi 27' c Ayanda Malinga 30' c Nompumelelo Mathe (2) 37' c, 48' c Sinazo Mcatshulwa (2) 45' c, 68' m Nadine Roos (2) 51' c, 59' c Simamkele Namba (4) 54' c, 56' m, 63' m, 78' m Asithandile Ntoyanto 73' c Con: Libbie Janse van Rensburg (14/20) 1', 6', 14', 19', 27', 31', 38', 45', 48', 51', 54', 59', 61', 73'; Cards: Babalwa Latsha (red card) 12' | | Pen: Leena Shipanga 35' | Referee: Eri Kamimura (JPN) |

=== Pool B ===
| Pos | Team | P | W | D | L | PF | PA | PD | BP | Pts |
|---|---|---|---|---|---|---|---|---|---|---|
| 1 | Kenya | 2 | 2 | 0 | 0 | 59 | 20 | +39 | 1 | 9 |
| 2 | Uganda | 2 | 1 | 0 | 1 | 39 | 40 | -1 | 0 | 4 |
| 3 | Zambia | 2 | 0 | 0 | 2 | 34 | 72 | -38 | 0 | 0 |

| 2022-10-25 | Uganda | 36–17 | Zambia | Muteesa II Wankulukuku Stadium, Kampala |
| 16:00 EAT (UTC+3) | Try: Angella Nanyonjo 14' c Charlotte Thereza Mudoola 38' c Peace Lekuru 57' c Con: Charlotte Thereza Mudoola (3) 15', 39', 58'; Pen: Charlotte Thereza Mudoola (5) 20', 23', 56', 65', 74' | | Try: Jane Malisa 48' m Rennie Suzi Willima 62' m Mary Lyamba 76' c Con: Veronic Lungu 76'; Cards: Elizabeth Chibomba (yellow card) 10' to 20' | Attendance: 700; Referee: Bimeta Sene (SEN) |

| 2022-10-29 | Zambia | 17–36 | Kenya (1 BP) | Muteesa II Wankulukuku Stadium, Kampala |
| 16:00 EAT (UTC+3) | Try: Mary Lyamba (2) 35' m, 61' m Veronica Lungu 39' c Con: Lushomo Liwena 39'; Cards: Elizabeth Chibomba (yellow card) 77' to 80' | | Try: Phoebe Otieno 3' m Naomi Amuguni 23' c Christabel Lindo 40' m Leah Ndungu 53' c Con: Grace Okullu 24'; Ann Ochieng 53'; Pen: Ann Ochieng (3) 37', 57', 71'; Drop: Ann Ochieng 33' | Attendance: 700; Referee: Julie Mamisoa (MDG) |

| 2022-11-02 | Uganda | 3–23 | Kenya | Muteesa II Wankulukuku Stadium, Kampala |
| 16:00 EAT (UTC+3) | Pen: Charlotte Thereza Mudoola 50' | | Try: Ann Ochieng 13' m Christabel Lindo 62' m Rose Otieno 80' c Con: Ann Ochieng 80'; Pen: Ann Ochieng 30'; Drop: Ann Ochieng 46'; Cards: Lydia Namabiro (yellow card) 69' to 79' | Referee: Bimeta Sene (SEN) |

=== Pool C ===
| Pos | Team | P | W | D | L | PF | PA | PD | BP | Pts |
|---|---|---|---|---|---|---|---|---|---|---|
| 1 | Madagascar | 2 | 2 | 0 | 0 | 61 | 30 | +31 | 2 | 10 |
| 2 | Tunisia | 2 | 1 | 0 | 1 | 29 | 34 | -5 | 1 | 5 |
| 3 | Senegal | 2 | 0 | 0 | 2 | 32 | 58 | -26 | 1 | 1 |

| 2022-10-14 | (1 BP) Tunisia | 24–7 | Senegal | Stade El Menzah, Tunis |
| 15:00 CET (UTC+1) | Try: Ahd Ragoubi (2) 48' m, 80+3' m Yassmine El Korbi 72' c Hzahra Haddaji 79' c Con: Emna Ben Arous (2) 72', 79' | | Try: Mariame Diaw 52' c Con: Coumba Barry 52'; Cards: Fatoumata Ba (yellow card) 56' to 66' | Attendance: 200; Referee: Christabelle Lim Mee (SGP) |

| 2022-10-18 | (1 BP) Madagascar | 34–25 | Senegal (1 BP) | Stade El Menzah, Tunis |
| 15:00 CET (UTC+1) | Try: Veronique Rasoanekena (2) 2' m, 13' m Ginah Raharimalala (2) 17' c, 73' m Fabrina Holinirina 29' c Sariaka Nomenjanahary 35' m Con: Tiana Razanamahefa 18', 29'; Cards: Tiana Pionona (yellow card) 48' to 58'; Monica Rasoloniaina (yellow card) 80+2' to 80+4'; Tiana Razanamahefa (yellow card) 80+4' to 80+4' | | Try: Mariame Diaw 52' c Khadija Camara 65' m Yvonne Mendy 77' m Dieynaba Camara 80+4' m Con: Coumba Barry 52'; Pen: Coumba Barry 37'; Cards: Fatou Diame (yellow card) 16' to 26'; Fatoumata Bah (yellow card) 30' to 40' | Attendance: 100; Referee: Christabelle Lim Mee (SGP) |

| 2022-10-22 | Tunisia | 5–27 | Madagascar (1 BP) | Stade El Menzah, Tunis |
| 15:00 CET (UTC+1) | Try: Mekni Meriem 28' m | | Try: Tiana Razanamahefa 12' c Veronique Rasoanekena (3) 36' c, 55' m, 65' m Con: Fabrina Holinirina (2) 12', 36'; Pen: Fabrina Holinirina 33' | Attendance: 400; Referee: Maria Latos (DEU) |

=== Pool D ===
| Pos | Team | P | W | D | L | PF | PA | PD | BP | Pts |
|---|---|---|---|---|---|---|---|---|---|---|
| 1 | Cameroon | 2 | 2 | 0 | 0 | 60 | 0 | +60 | 1 | 9 |
| 2 | Ivory Coast | 2 | 1 | 0 | 1 | 50 | 18 | +32 | 1 | 5 |
| 3 | Burkina Faso | 2 | 0 | 0 | 2 | 10 | 102 | -92 | 0 | 0 |

| 2022-11-04 | Cameroon | 8–0 | Ivory Coast | Stade Omnisport Paul Biya, Yaoundé |
| 14:00 WAT (UTC+1) | Try: Fatoumata Cisse 46' m Pen: Rosine Maxime Ndingo Priso 60' | | | Referee: Beril Akinyi (KEN) |

| 2022-11-08 | (1 BP) Ivory Coast | 50–10 | Burkina Faso | Stade Omnisport Paul Biya, Yaoundé |
| 14:00 WAT (UTC+1) | Try: Fereta Aicha Sekongo 17' m Antoinette Gbeuli 21' c Fatoumata Cisse (2) 28' c, 31' c Adeline Lamoine 48' c Fanta Toure 62' c Kpan Anais Goue 79' c Con: Leila Chauveau (4) 22', 28', 32', 49'; Ahou Salimatou Mone 63'; Adeline Lamoine 79'; Pen: Leila Chauveau 12'; Cards: Safiatou Konate (yellow card) 57' to 67' | | Try: Guemilatou Zombre 65' m Awa Goro 80+3' m Cards: Mariam Ouedraogo (yellow card) 20' to 30'; Aicha Guira (yellow card) 60' to 70' | Referee: Julie Randriarimanana (MAD) |

| 2022-11-12 | (1 BP) Cameroon | 52–0 | Burkina Faso | Stade Omnisport Paul Biya, Yaoundé |
| 14:00 WAT (UTC+1) | Try: Raissa Ngoh Eyindo 3' m Danielle Moudangwedi (2) 7' m, 41' m Yvana Mengue (2) 12' m, 29' m Honorine Mbuh Fri 19' m Andrea Ntouh Dooh 36' m Oriane Tankeu 45' m Lydie Colette Younga Ewane (2) 59' m, 72' c Con: Teclaire Endalle 73'; Cards: Lydie Colette Younga Ewane (yellow card) 78' to 80'; Teclaire Endalle (yellow card) 78' to 80' | | Cards: Mariam Ouedraogo (yellow card) 34' to 44'; Mariam Bance (yellow card) 78' to 80' | Referee: Beril Akinyi (KEN) |
