= Burkina Faso women's national rugby union team =

Burkina Faso
- Nickname: Stallions
- Union: Burkina Faso Rugby Federation
- Home stadium: 4 August 1983 Stadium

World Rugby ranking
- Current: 61 (as of 2 March 2026)
- Highest: 57
- Lowest: 61 (2026)

First international
- Burkina Faso 0–37 Cameroon (9 June 2021, Stadium Aout 4, Ouagadougou)

Biggest defeat
- Burkina Faso 0–37 Cameroon

The Burkina Faso women's national rugby union team is a national sporting side that represents Burkina Faso in rugby union. They played their first test match against Cameroon in 2021.

== History ==
Burkina Faso hosted Cameroon for a two-test series in Ouagadougou. They played their first international test on 9 June 2021, and lost 37–0 to the Indomitable Lionesses of Cameroon. They scored their first international points in the second test loss three days later, the score was 35–3.

Burkina Faso competed at the 2022 Rugby Africa Women's Cup in Yaoundé, Cameroon.

== Record ==
=== Overall ===
Opponent	First game	Played	Won	Drawn	Lost	For	Against	Win %
Cameroon	2021	3	0	0	3	3	124	0.00%
Ivory Coast	2022	1	0	0	1	10	50	0.00%
Summary	2021	4	0	0	4	13	174	0.00%

=== Full internationals ===
Won	Lost	Draw

Test	Date	PF	PA	Opponent	Venue	Tournament
1	9 June 2021	0	37	Cameroon	Stade du 4 Août, Ouagadougou	2021 Rugby Africa Series
2	12 June 2021	3	35	Cameroon	Stade du 4 Août, Ouagadougou	2021 Rugby Africa Series
3	8 November 2022	10	50	Ivory Coast	Stade Omnisport Paul Biya, Yaoundé	2022 Rugby Africa Cup
4	12 November 2022	0	52	Cameroon	Stade Omnisport Paul Biya, Yaoundé	2022 Rugby Africa Cup
