= 2021 Rugby Africa Women's Series =

Tournament details
- Date: 9 June 2021–13 October 2021
- Countries: Burkina Faso; Cameroon; Ivory Coast; Kenya; Madagascar; Namibia; Senegal; Tunisia; Uganda; Zambia; Zimbabwe
- Teams: 11

Tournament statistics
- Matches played: 10

The 2021 Rugby Africa Women's Series was a series of test matches that replaced the Rugby Africa Women's Cup competition. The purpose of the series was to assess teams, and to give them an opportunity to exhibit their talent ahead of the newly announced WXV competition.

== Test matches ==
=== June ===
9 June 2021	Burkina Faso	0–37	Cameroon	Stade du 4 Août, Ouagadougou
16:00 GMT (UTC+0)			Try: Etindo Raissa Ngoh 2' m Yondno Gertrude Prombove 13' m Manuella Ngounou 19' m Suzie Mbeya 40' m Léa Eboule 46' m Marie Felice Belle Nana 59' c Marie Paule Nganssa Djomo 70' m Con: Ntchateu Oriane Tankeu 60'; Cards: Priso Rosine Ndingo (yellow card) 26' to 36'	Attendance: 0 Referee: Bineta Sene (SEN)

12 June 2021	Cameroon	35–3	Burkina Faso	Stade du 4 Août, Ouagadougou
16:00 GMT (UTC+0)	Try: Ngassa Fandio 4' c Nkouane Teclaire Endalle 22' m Suzie Mbeya 58' m Ntchateu Oriane Tankeu 67' m Etindo Raissa Ngoh 69' m Mimosette Mouto 71' m Con: Priso Rosine Ndingo 5'; Pen: Priso Rosine Ndingo 18'; Cards: Mimosette Mouto (yellow card) 50' to 60'		Pen: Liliane Some 51'; Cards: Janine Bonkoungou (yellow card) 67' to 77'; Adjaratou Yanogo (yellow card) 69' to 79'	Attendance: 400; Referee: Bineta Sene (SEN)

=== July ===
3 July 2021	Kenya	15–27	Madagascar	Nyayo National Stadium, Nairobi
11:00 EAT (UTC+3)	Try: Dorcas Sinaida 15' m Staycy Atieno 29' m Michelle Akinyi 48' m		Try: Sophie Razafiarisoa 2' c Veronique Rasoanekena (3) 8' c, 22' m, 70' m Con: Tantely Razafimahefa (2) 3', 9'; Pen: Tantely Razafimahefa 33'	Referee: Noreen Liyosi (KEN)

11 July 2021	Madagascar	10–0	Kenya	Nyayo National Stadium, Nairobi
11:00 EAT (UTC+3)	Try: Zoanah Fanantenana 4' m Veronique Rasoanekena 69' m Cards: Tikasoa Raholinirina (yellow card) 27' to 37'; Aina Rakotozafy (yellow card) 78' to 80'			Referee: Duncan Kioko (KEN)

14 July 2021	Uganda	41–0	Zimbabwe	Kyadondo Rugby Club, Kampala
13:00 EAT (UTC+3)	Try: Samiya Ajikoru 17' m Emilly Lekuru (3) 23' m, 55' c, 68' m Grace Auma 59' c Peace Lekuru 73' m Asha Nakityo 80+3' c Con: Charlotte Mudoola (2) 56', 60'; Masitula Namboozo 80+4'; Cards: Yvonne Najjuma (yellow card) 35' to 45'		Cards: Andile Shamiane Moyo (yellow card) 79' to 80'	Referee: Beril Akinyi (KEN)

18 July 2021	Zimbabwe	3–34	Uganda	Kyadondo Rugby Club, Kampala
13:00 EAT (UTC+3)	Pen: Delight Dananai Mukomondo 76'; Cards: Rufaro Tagarira (yellow card) 67' to 77'		Try: Peace Lekuru (2) 30' c, 33' c Emily Lekuru 45' c Faith Namugga 58' c Con: Charlotte Mudoola (4) 30', 33', 46', 59'; Pen: Charlotte Mudoola (2) 4', 67'; Cards: Winnie Atyang (yellow card) 17' to 27'; Yvonne Najjuma (yellow card) 40+2' to 50'	Referee: Rosenburg Kanyunyuzi (UGA)

=== October ===
9 October 2021	Tunisia	14–3	Senegal	Stade El Menzah, Tunis
15:30 CET (UTC+1)	Try: Amal Dardouri 4' m Pen: Amani Ben Salem (3) 62', 67', 77'; Cards: Emna Zarai (yellow card) 22' to 32'; Ranim Madouri (yellow card) 31' to 41'		Pen: Marieme Coumba Barry 65'; Cards: Anna Michelle Prudence Preira (yellow card) 60' to 70' (yellow card) 80' (yellow-red card)	Referee: Beril Akinyi (KEN)

13 October 2021	Senegal	45–5	Ivory Coast	Stade El Menzah, Tunis
15:30 CET (UTC+1)	Try: Marieme Coumba Barry 20' m Absa Cherif 31' m Amy Nyafouna 43' m Fatou Diame 57' c Fatoumata Bah 61' m Dieynaba Camara (2) 77' m, 80+5' c Con: Marieme Coumba Barry 58'; Fatoumata Bah 80+6'; Pen: Marieme Coumba Barry 12', 52'; Cards: Fatou Diame (yellow card) 1' to 11'; Yvone Mendy (yellow card) 66' to 76'		Try: Andréa Dirabou Kouassi 34'; Cards: Wassagbe Doumbia (yellow card) 11' to 21'	Referee: Aymen Jriji (TUN)

17 October 2021	Tunisia	61–0	Ivory Coast	Stade El Menzah, Tunis
14:30 CET (UTC+1)	Try: Ranim Madouri (5) 7' m, 22' m, 31' m, 35' c, 48' c Rihab Hammouda (2) 15' m, 65' c Hajer Saoudi 40' c Abir Dhaheri 52' m Sana Chaarana 68' m Con: Amani Ben Salem (4) 36', 41', 49', 66'; Pen: Amani Ben Salem 29'			Referee: Saudah Adiru (UGA)

=== November ===
13 November 2021	Namibia	5–75	Zambia	Hage Geingob Rugby Stadium, Windhoek
16:30 CAT (UTC+2)	Try: Alicia Gertze 29' m Cards: Fiola Vliete (yellow card) 18' to 28'		Try: Jane Malisa (2) 5' m, 73' m Natasha Musonda (3) 10' c, 45' c, 47' m Dorothy Kasonka (2) 12' c, 42' m Lillian Mukosha 20' c Queen Nachinga 24' m Elizabeth Chibomba 38' m Rennie Willma Suzie 58' m Loveness Nambela 63' c Juliet Mwamba 80' m Con: Rennie Willma Suzi (2) 10', 21'; Veronica Lungo 13'; Dorothy Kasonka (2) 45', 64'	Referee: Bineta Sene (SEN)
