= Polytechnic University of San-Pédro =

University of Polytechnics of San-Pédro
- Université Polytechnique de San Pedro
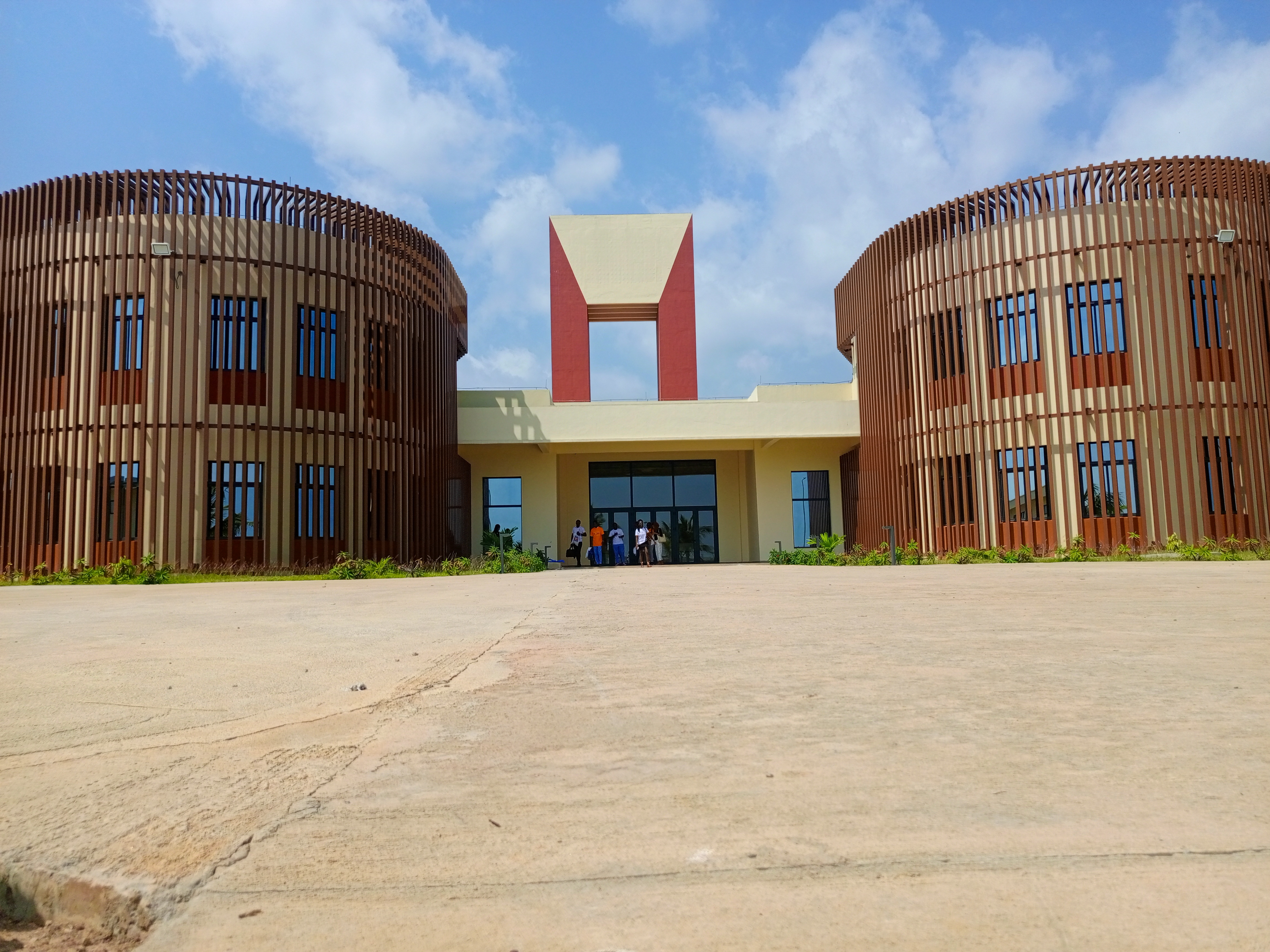
- Library of the University of San-Pedro in 2024
- Type: Public university
- Established: 2021
- President: Prof. Méké Meïté
- Students: Approximately 600 (2021)
- Location: San-Pédro, Bas-Sassandra District, Côte d'Ivoire; 4.786°N 6.698°W
- Campus: Urban, San-Pédro
- Language: French
- Affiliations: Agence universitaire de la Francophonie (AUF)
- Website: Official website

The University of Polytechnics of San-Pédro (UPSP) is a public university located in the city of San-Pédro in the San-Pédro region (Bas-Sassandra District) in Côte d'Ivoire.

== History ==
On 30 November 2018, the foundation stone for the infrastructure was laid by the late Prime Minister Amadou Gon Coulibaly. With more than 400 students, the university opened its doors on 19 October 2021, and will ultimately accommodate over 20,000 students. The goal is to increase the capacity of higher education and, above all, to specialize young people to make them competent actors for the development of each region of the country. The President of the university is Professor Méké Meïté, appointed in 2021.

Established by decree 02021-278 on 9 June 2021, the University of San Pedro is a public administrative institution of higher education and multidisciplinary research. It is part of the university decentralization policy (PDU) initiated by the Ivorian State since 2011.

The total cost of constructing the University of San Pédro is 184 billion CFA francs.

== Mission ==
Located in the economically promising Southwest region, the University of San-Pédro places central importance on sustainable development. This orientation stems from economic and environmental imperatives related to fundamental values such as openness, excellence, sustainability, and humanity. The university operates within a complex context marked by challenges such as student population growth, university decentralization with program diversification, the creation of institutions fostering local and national development, and the public authorities' desire for higher education focused on new technologies and innovative programs to stimulate the economy.

The main mission of the University of Polytechnics of San-Pédro is therefore to ensure the education of new generations of students in harmony with the economic capacities of the Southwest region. Its clear objective is to contribute to the development of Côte d'Ivoire in general and to highlight regional potential by providing professionally trained individuals in specific fields. While the strength of a university lies in offering programs leading to internationally recognized degrees, it is equally essential that Ivorian graduates be competent not only in Côte d'Ivoire but also internationally. This is why we aspire to make the University of Polytechnics of San-Pédro an attractive institution of higher education and scientific research, both nationally and internationally.

To achieve its secondary missions, the University of Polytechnics of San-Pédro trains qualified professionals in scientific and technical fields, tailored to the economic challenges of Côte d'Ivoire and Africa, aware of their responsibilities towards their communities, and capable of embodying the values of work, citizenship, and unity. It encourages research in the fields of science, technology, digital, culture, and society.

== Academic structure ==
The University Polytechnique of San-Pédro (UPSP) is a thematic university pole with innovative training offered by four Training and Research Units (UFRs):

- UFR Agriculture, Fisheries Resources and Agro-industry to meet the need for human resources in the country's major industries.
- UFR Marine Sciences to train highly qualified students in oceanography, marine resources, and coastal sciences.
- UFR Logistics, Tourism, Hotel-Restaurant to meet the challenge of qualifying personnel in the Ivorian tourism sector and support Côte d'Ivoire's ambition to become the 5th African tourist destination by 2025.
- UFR Health Sciences in Côte d'Ivoire for the training of general practitioners.

The university also includes a Preparatory Class for Grandes Écoles (CPGE): Mathematics, Physics and Engineering Sciences (MPSI) and two Engineering Schools, including the School of Engineering in Building and Public Works and the School of Engineering in Shipbuilding.
