= Lerato Makua =

South African rugby union and sevens player

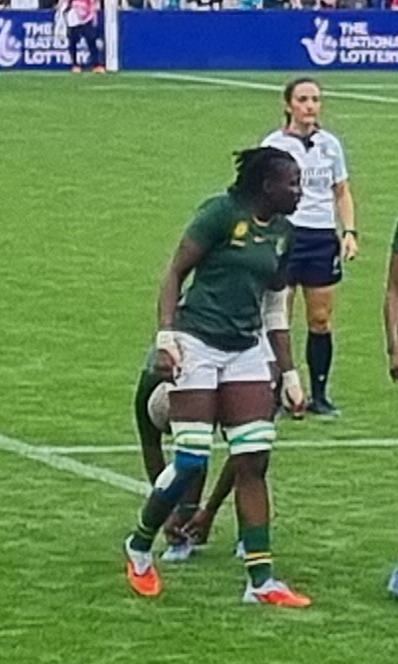
- Born: 7 December 1999 (age 26)
- Height: 1.72 m (5 ft 8 in)
- Weight: 70 kg (154 lb)

Rugby union career
- Position: Lock
Senior career
Years	Team	Apps	(Points)
	Blue Bulls Women		(0)
International career
Years	Team	Apps	(Points)
2021–	South Africa	19	(25)
- Correct as of 14 September 2025
National sevens team
Years	Team		Comps
	South Africa		9

Lerato Elizabeth Makua (born 7 December 1999) is a South African rugby player. She has represented South Africa internationally in rugby sevens and fifteens.

== Rugby career ==
Makua represented South Africa at the 2022 Rugby World Cup Sevens in Cape Town. She was also named in South Africa's women's fifteens team for the delayed Rugby World Cup in New Zealand. She was cited for biting a player during South Africa's match against England at the World Cup, she was later suspended for six matches.

In 2023, she competed for the Springbok women at the Rugby Africa Women's Cup in Madagascar. She underwent knee surgery in 2024 and successfully completed her rehabilitation before she joined the squad in their week-long training camp at the Stellenbosch Academy of Sport in February 2025.

She was named in the South African side for the 2025 Rugby Africa Women's Cup.
