= Senegal women's national rugby union team =

Senegal
- Union: Senegalese Rugby Federation

World Rugby ranking
- Current: 53 (as of 2 March 2026)
- Highest: 39 (2023)
- Lowest: 53 (2026)

First international
- Tunisia 14–3 Senegal (Stade El Menzah, Tunis; 9 October 2021)

Biggest win
- Senegal 45–5 Ivory Coast (Stade El Menzah, Tunis; 13 October 2021)

Biggest defeat
- Tunisia 24–7 Senegal (Stade El Menzah, Tunis; 14 October 2022)

The Senegal women's national rugby union team are a national sports team that represents Senegal in women's international rugby union. They played their first test match against Tunisia in 2021.

== History ==
Senegal played their first test match against Tunisia on 9 October 2021 at Stade El Menzah in Tunis, Tunisia won the match 14–3. They then defeated the Ivory Coast four days later in their second international.

Senegal competed at the 2022 Rugby Africa Women's Cup, they were grouped with Madagascar and Tunisia in Pool C. They lost both matches and failed to qualify for the next stage.

== Results summary ==
(Full internationals only, updated to 24 April 2023)

Senegal Internationals From 2021
Opponent	First Match	Played	Won	Drawn	Lost	For	Against	Win %
Ivory Coast	2021	1	1	0	0	45	5	100.00%
Madagascar	2022	1	0	0	1	25	34	0.00%
Tunisia	2021	2	0	0	2	10	38	0.00%
Summary	2021	4	1	0	3	80	77	25.00%

== Results ==
=== Full internationals ===
Won	Lost	Draw

Test	Date	PF	PA	Opponent	Venue	Event	Ref
1	9 October 2021	3	14	Tunisia	Stade El Menzah, Tunis	2021 Africa Cup	
2	13 October 2021	45	5	Ivory Coast	Stade El Menzah, Tunis	2021 Africa Cup	
3	14 October 2022	7	24	Tunisia	Stade El Menzah, Tunis	2022 Africa Cup	
4	18 October 2022	25	34	Madagascar	Stade El Menzah, Tunis	2022 Africa Cup	
