= 2023 Rugby Africa Women's Cup =

Tournament details
- Host: Madagascar
- Venue: Antananarivo
- Date: 20 May 2023– 28 May 2023
- Countries: Cameroon; Kenya; Madagascar; South Africa
- Teams: 4

Final positions
- Champions: South Africa (2nd title)
- Runner-up: Kenya

Tournament statistics
- Matches played: 6
- Tries scored: 60 (10 per match)

The 2023 Rugby Africa Women's Cup is the third edition of the Rugby Africa Women's Cup. The 12 teams are split in 3 divisions that play a single round-robin. The composition of the divisions was decided according to the pool results of the 2022 edition. Division 1 will take place in Antananarivo and the winner and runner-up will classify for the inaugural edition of the WXV.

South Africa won their second title.

== Standings ==
Pos	Team	P	W	D	L	PF	PA	PD	BP	Pts
1	South Africa	3	3	0	0	214	8	206	3	15
2	Kenya	3	2	0	1	81	71	10	2	10
3	Madagascar	3	1	0	2	58	118	-60	1	5
4	Cameroon	3	0	0	3	13	169	-156	0	0
Champion classified for WXV2. Runner-up classified for WXV3.

== Fixtures ==
=== Round 1 ===
20 May 2023	(1BP) South Africa	87–0	Cameroon	Stade Makis, Antananarivo
13:00 EAT (UTC+3)	Try: Roseline Botes (2) 3' c, 36' m Jakkie Cilliers 7' m Asiphe Mayaba (4) 23' c, 42' m, 45' c, 71' m Penalty Try 28'; Asithandile Ntoyanto 31' m Nompumelelo Mathe 40+1' m Rights Mkhari (3) 51' m, 77' m, 79' c Lindelwa Gwala 63' c Simamkele Namba 80' c Con: Jakkie Cilliers (2) 4', 24'; Libbie Janse van Rensburg (3) 46', 64', 79'		Cards: Mimosette Mouto (yellow card) 29' to 39'	Referee: Julie Randriarimanana (MDG)

20 May 2023	(1BP) Kenya	29–20	Madagascar	Stade Makis, Antananarivo
15:00 EAT (UTC+3)	Try: Grace Okulu (2) 11' m, 30' m Penalty Try 39'; Judith Okumu (2) 48' m, 63' c Con: Ann Ochieng 64'; Cards: Diana Ochieng (yellow card) 73' to 80'		Try: Ginah Raharimalala 45' c Zaya Fanantenana 53' m Miora Rabarivelo 69' m Con: Fabrina Holiniaina 46'; Pen: Fabrina Holiniaina 7'; Cards: Delphine Raharimalala (yellow card) 39' to 49'; Sariaka Nomenjanahary (yellow card) 40' to 50'; Nanou Razafializay (yellow card) 60' to 70'	Referee: Precious Pazani (ZWE)

=== Round 2 ===
24 May 2023	(1BP) South Africa	48–0	Kenya	Stade Makis, Antananarivo
13:00 EAT (UTC+3)	Try: Zintle Mpupha (2) 3' c, 49' c Nomawethu Mabenge (4) 15' m, 25' c, 40' m, 80' c Sizophila Solontsi 32' m Chumisa Qawe 38' m Con: Libbie Janse van Rensburg (4) 5', 26', 50', 80'; Cards: Lusanda Dumke (yellow card) 44' to 54'; Nomawethu Mabenge (yellow card) 53' to 63'; Unam Tose (yellow card) 59' to 69'		Cards: Grace Okulu (yellow card) 37' to 47'	Referee: Maria Heitor (PRT)

24 May 2023	(1BP) Madagascar	30–10	Cameroon	Stade Makis, Antananarivo
15:00 EAT (UTC+3)	Try: Mamisoa Rasoarimalala (2) 2' m, 13' m, Miora Rabarivelo 27' m Mialy Ravaoarinoro 60' m Nantenaina Ravololonirrina 77' c Con: Zaya Fanantenana 78'; Pen: Nantenaina Ravololonirrina 45'; Cards: Laurence Rasoanandrasana (yellow card) 33' to 43'		Try: Danielle Moudangwedi (2) 6' m, 33' m Cards: Danielle Moudangwedi (yellow card) 20' to 30'; Laure Fandio Irene Ngassa (yellow card) 43' to 53'; Mimosette Mouto (yellow card) 64' to 74'; Assouga Rosine Ntsa (yellow card) 77' to 80'	Referee: Bineta Sene (SEN)

=== Round 3 ===
28 May 2023	(1BP) Kenya	52–3	Cameroon	Stade Makis, Antananarivo
13:00 EAT (UTC+3)	Try: Nelly Chikombe 4' c Grace Okulu (2) 6' c, 59' m Judith Okumu 34' m Phoebe Otieno 50' c Stella Wafula 54' c Terry Isabwa 65' c Mitchelle Owuor 79' c Con: Grace Okulu (4) 5', 7', 52', 59'; Ann Ochieng 55', 80'		Pen: Assouga Rosine Ntsa 47'; Cards: Lea Olive Eboule (yellow card) 28' to 38'; Gladys Magala (yellow card) 31' to 41'; Danielle Moudangwedi (red card) 45'	Referee: Maria Heitor (PRT)

28 May 2023	(1BP) South Africa	79–8	Madagascar	Stade Makis, Antananarivo
15:00 EAT (UTC+3)	Try: Lindelwa Gwala 5' m Sanelisiwe Charlie 10' c Chumisa Qawe 17' c Sizophila Solontsi (2) 25' c, 80+3' c Nomawethu Mabenge (2) 34' c, 43' c Danelle Lochner 47' m Simamkele Namba 50' m Libbie Janse van Rensburg 54' m Sinazo Mcatshulwa 60' m Asiphe Mayaba 69' m Lusanda Dumke 75' c Con: Libbie Janse van Rensburg (5) 11', 18', 26', 35', 44'; Jacomina Cilliers (2) 76', 80+5'		Try: Zaya Fanantenana 42' m Pen: Zaya Fanantenana 14'	Referee: Precious Pazani (ZWE)
