= 2025 Rugby Africa Women's Cup =

Rugby tournament

Tournament details
- Host: Madagascar
- Venue: Stade Makis, Antananarivo
- Date: 7 – 15 June 2025
- Countries: Kenya; Madagascar; South Africa; Uganda
- Teams: 4

Final positions
- Champions: South Africa (4th title)
- Runner-up: Kenya

Tournament statistics
- Matches played: 6

The 2025 Rugby Africa Women's Cup is the fifth edition of the tournament and will be held in Antananarivo, Madagascar from 7 to 15 June. Uganda secured their place in the premier division after winning the Division 1 competition earlier in April, they will replace Cameroon.

The Springbok Women were crowned champions for the fourth time after they defeated hosts, Madagascar, in the final match.

== Venue ==
2025 Rugby Africa Women's Cup is located in Madagascar	Antananarivo
2025 Rugby Africa Women's Cup is located in Madagascar	Stade Makis
2025 Rugby Africa Women's Cup is located in Madagascar	Capacity: 20,000

== Standings ==
Pos	Team	Pld	W	D	L	PF	PA	PD	TF	TA	TB	LB	Pts	RSA	KEN	UGA	MAD
1	South Africa	3	3	0	0	142	36	+106	22	6	2	0	14	—	19–12	62–7	61–17
2	Kenya	3	2	0	1	87	24	+63	15	4	2	1	11		—	47–0	28–5
3	Uganda	3	1	0	2	31	129	−98	5	22	1	0	5			—	
4	Madagascar	3	0	0	3	42	113	−71	7	17	0	1	1			20–24	—

== Fixtures ==
=== Round 1 ===
7 June 2025
13:00 EAT (UTC+3)

(1 BP) South Africa	62–7	Uganda
Try: Anushka Groenewald 5' c Simamkele Namba 10' m Faith Tshauke (2) 17' m, 42' c Byrhandrè Dolf 24' c Lerato Makua 38' m Patience Mokone (2) 47' c, 71' m Aphiwe Ngwevu 64' c Sinothile Bhengu 69' c Con: Mary Zulu (4) 5', 25', 43', 48'; Byrhandrè Dolf 64'; Simamkele Namba 70'; Cards: Simamkele Namba (yellow card) 57'	Report	Try: Grace Nabaggala 51' c Con: Tina Akello 52'; Cards: Hellen Acanit (yellow card) 63'

Stade Makis, Antananarivo
Referee: Bineta Sene (Senegal)

7 June 2025
15:00 EAT (UTC+3)

(1 BP) Kenya	28–5	Madagascar
Try: Phoebe Akinyi Otieno 25' c Stella Wafula 43' m Moreen Muritu 62' m Sinaida Nyachio 80' m Con: Sinaida Nyachio 26'; Pen: Grace Okulu 48'; Drop: Grace Okulu 51'	Report	Try: Olivia Hanitriniaina 37' m

Stade Makis, Antananarivo
Referee: Ronald Wutimber (Uganda)

=== Round 2 ===
11 June 2025
13:00 EAT (UTC+3)

South Africa	19–12	Kenya (1 BP)
Try: Aphiwe Ngwevu 4' c Lerato Makua 35' m Nobuhle Mjwara 68' c Con: Mary Zulu (2) 4', 68'; Cards: Xoliswa Khuzwayo (yellow card) 15'; Simamkele Namba (yellow card) 80+2'	Report	Try: Freshia Oduor 72' c Nollin Khaleyi 76' m Con: Esther Juma 73'

Stade Makis, Antananarivo
Referee: Julie Randriarimanana (Madagascar)

11 June 2025
15:00 EAT (UTC+3)

(1 BP) Madagascar	20–24	Uganda (1 BP)
Try: Zaya Fanantenana 2' m Veronique Rasoanekena 37' m Laurence Rasoanandrasana 53' c Con: Nirina Ravaoharisoa 53'; Pen: Nirina Ravaoharisoa 49'; Cards: Sarindra Sahondramalala (yellow card) 74'	Report	Try: Bushira Namutebi 7' m Angella Nanyonjo 34' c Agnes Nakuya 59' c Grace Nabaggala 65' m Con: Janati Nandudu (2) 35', 61'

Stade Makis, Antananarivo
Referee: Bineta Sene (Senegal)

=== Round 3 ===
15 June 2025
13:00 EAT (UTC+3)

Kenya	47–0	Uganda
Try: Natasha Emali 18' m Sheilla Chajira 32' m Faith Livoi 37' m Nollin Khaleyi 40' m Penalty Try 47'; Naomi Amuguni 51' m Stella Wafula (2) 61' m, 73' m Edith Nariaka 69' m	report	Cards: Proscovia Mukyala (yellow card) 31'; Juliet Nandawula (yellow card) 47'

Stade Makis, Antananarivo
Referee: Stephane Rakotonirainy (Madagascar)

15 June 2025
15:00 EAT (UTC+3)

South Africa	61–17	Madagascar
Try: Faith Tshauke 2' c Patience Mokone (2) 9' c, 26' c Byrhandrè Dolf (2) 21' c, 38' c Aphiwe Ngwevu (2) 41' c, 76' c Unam Tose 47' c Nomawethu Mabenge 62' m Con: Mary Zulu (7) 3', 10', 22', 27', 39', 41', 48'; Chuma Qawe 77'; Cards: Nombuyekezo Mdliki (yellow card) 57'; Simamkele Namba (yellow card) 80'	report	Try: Veronique Rasoanekena 53' c Valisoa Razanakiniana 58' m Tiana Razanamahefa 80' m Con: Zaya Fanantenana 54'

Stade Makis, Antananarivo
Referee: Ronald Wutimber (Uganda)
