= 2024 Rugby Africa Women's Cup =

Rugby tournament

Tournament details
- Host: Madagascar
- Venue: Stade Makis, Antananarivo
- Date: 4 – 12 May 2024
- Countries: Cameroon; Kenya; Madagascar; South Africa
- Teams: 4

Final positions
- Champions: South Africa
- Runner-up: Madagascar

The 2024 Rugby Africa Women's Cup was the tournament's fourth edition and was held in Antananarivo, Madagascar from 4 to 12 May. The champion qualified directly for the 2025 Rugby World Cup and also for the 2024 WXV 2 competition. The runner-up qualified for the 2024 WXV 3 and also has a chance of qualifying for the 2025 Women's World Cup as the remaining six places will be awarded to the highest-finishing teams in WXV who have not qualified via the 2021 Rugby World Cup or the regional tournaments.

South Africa defended their title successfully and booked their spot in the 2025 Women's Rugby World Cup. Runners-up, Madagascar, made their WXV debut in September 2024.

== Standings ==
Pos	Team	Pld	W	D	L	PF	PA	PD	TF	TA	TB	LB	Pts	Qualification	RSA	MAD	KEN	CMR
1	South Africa	3	3	0	0	164	22	+142	28	4	3	0	15	Qualifies for the 2025 Women's Rugby World Cup and 2024 WXV 2	—		63–5	55–0
2	Madagascar	3	2	0	1	58	73	−15	10	13	1	0	9	Qualifies for 2024 WXV 3	17–46	—		12–5
3	Kenya	3	1	0	2	66	109	−43	12	19	1	1	6			22–29	—	17–39
4	Cameroon	3	0	0	3	22	106	−84	4	18	0	1	1					—

== Fixtures ==
=== Round 1 ===
4 May 2024
13:00 EAT (UTC+3)

(1 BP) South Africa	55–0	Cameroon
Try: Gwala 12' c, 26' m Lochner 33' c Ubisi 46' m Tchogna-Njamen 51' c Samboya 56' c, 60' m, 65' c Ngwevu 72'; Con: Zulu (5/9) 13', 34', 52', 57', 67'	Report

Stade Makis, Antananarivo
Referee: Julie Randriarimanana (Madagascar)

4 May 2024
15:00 EAT (UTC+3)

(1 BP) Kenya	22–29	Madagascar (1 BP)
	Report

Stade Makis, Antananarivo
Referee: Bineta Sene (Senegal)

=== Round 2 ===
8 May 2024
13:00 EAT (UTC+3)

South Africa	63–5	Kenya
Try: Dumke 5' m Mdletshe 16' m, 28' c Cilliers 20' m, 31' m, 50' c Ubisi 38' m Mabenge 43', 80' m Gwala 61' c, 74' m Con: Cilliers (3/11) 29', 50', 62'	Report	Try: Rose Otieno 35' m

Stade Makis, Antananarivo
Referee: Adèle Robert (Belgium)

8 May 2024
15:00 EAT (UTC+3)

Madagascar	12–5	Cameroon
	Report

Stade Makis, Antananarivo
Referee: Mélissa Leboeuf (France)

=== Round 3 ===
12 May 2024
13:00 EAT (UTC+3)

Cameroon	17–39	Kenya
	Report

Stade Makis, Antananarivo
Referee: Julie Randriarimanana (Madagascar)

12 May 2024
15:00 EAT (UTC+3)

Madagascar	17–46	South Africa
Try: Felana Rakotoarison 28' m Voahirana Razafiarisoa 69' m Laurence Rasoanandrasana 77' c Con: Voahirana Razafiarisoa (1/3) 78'	Report	Try: Grain 10' c Dumke 15' m, 45' c Mdletshe 21' m, 24' m Cilliers 39' m, 64' c Ntoyanto 72' m Con: Cilliers (3/8) 11', 47', 66'

Stade Makis, Antananarivo
Referee: Mélissa Leboeuf (France)
