= Botswana women's national rugby union team =

Botswana
- Nickname: Vultures
- Union: Botswana Rugby Union

World Rugby ranking
- Current: 63 (as of 2 March 2026)
- Highest: 59
- Lowest: 63 (2026)

First international
- Botswana 10–31 Namibia (19 October 2013)

Biggest defeat
- Botswana 10–31 Namibia

The Botswana women's national rugby union team are a national sports team that represents Botswana in women's international rugby union. They played their first test match in 2013 and have only played two games to date.

== History ==
Botswana played their first test match against Namibia on 19 October 2013 in Windhoek, Namibia.

They faced Zimbabwe in a non-capped friendly match on 27 May 2017 at Wharic Park, Garbarone; they came from behind and defeated Zimbabwe 17–10. They met Zimbabwe again two months later and lost 5–10, the match was recognised as a full test by both Rugby unions and World Rugby.

== Record ==
=== Overall ===
Opponent	First game	Played	Won	Drawn	Lost	For	Against	Win %
Namibia	2013	1	0	0	1	10	31	0.00%
Zimbabwe	2017	1	0	0	1	5	10	0.00%
Summary		2	0	0	2	15	41	0.00%

=== Full Internationals ===
Won	Lost	Draw

Test	Date	Opponent	PF	PA	Venue	Event
1	2013-10-19	Namibia	10	31	Windhoek, Namibia	Test match
2	2017-07-22	Zimbabwe	5	10	Hartsfield Rugby Grounds, Bulawayo	Test match
