= Ivory Coast women's national rugby union team =

Ivory Coast
- Union: Ivorian Rugby Federation

World Rugby ranking
- Current: 58 (as of 2 March 2026)
- Highest: 43 (2023)
- Lowest: 58 (2026)

First international
- Senegal 45–5 Ivory Coast (Stade El Menzah, Tunis; 13 October 2021)

Biggest win
- Ivory Coast 50–10 Burkina Faso (Stade Omnisport Paul Biya, Yaoundé; 8 November 2022)

Biggest defeat
- Tunisia 85–0 Ivory Coast (El Menzah Stadium, Tunis; 8 May 2026)

The Ivory Coast women's national rugby union team are a national sports team that represents the Ivory Coast in women's international rugby union. They played their first test match in 2021.

== History ==
Ivory Coast played their first international against Senegal on 13 October 2021 at Stade El Menzah in Tunis, they then met Tunisia for their second test. They competed at the 2022 Rugby Africa Women's Cup and recorded their first victory when they beat Burkina Faso 50–10.

In 2025, they hosted the Rugby Africa Women's Cup Division 1 tournament at Stade Auguste-Denis in San-Pédro.

== Record ==
=== Overall ===
(Full internationals only, updated to 12 May 2026)

Ivory Coast Internationals From 2021
Opponent	First Match	Played	Won	Drawn	Lost	For	Against	Win %
Burkina Faso	2022	1	1	0	0	50	10	100.00%
Cameroon	2022	1	0	0	1	0	8	0.00%
Morocco	1	0	0	1	0	5	27	100.00%
Senegal	2021	1	0	0	1	5	45	0.00%
Tunisia	2021	3	0	0	3	0	149	0.00%
Uganda	2025	1	0	0	1	0	52	0.00%
Zimbabwe	2025	1	0	0	1	8	46	0.00%
Summary	2021	7	1	0	6	63	256	14.3%

=== Full Internationals ===
Won	Lost	Draw

Test	Date	Opponent	PF	PA	Venue	Event	Ref
1	13 October 2021	Senegal	5	45	Stade El Menzah, Tunis	2021 Africa Cup	
2	17 October 2021	Tunisia	0	61	Stade El Menzah, Tunis	2021 Africa Cup	
3	4 November 2022	Cameroon	0	8	Stade Omnisport Paul Biya, Yaoundé	2022 Africa Cup	
4	8 November 2022	Burkina Faso	50	10	Stade Omnisport Paul Biya, Yaoundé	2022 Africa Cup	
5	11 April 2025	Zimbabwe	8	46	Stade Auguste-Denis, San-Pédro	2025 RAC Div. 1	
6	15 April 2025	Uganda	0	52	Stade Auguste-Denis, San-Pédro	2025 RAC Div. 1	
7	19 April 2025	Tunisia	0	34	Stade Auguste-Denis, San-Pédro	2025 RAC Div. 1	
8	8 May 2026	Tunisia	0	85	El Menzah Stadium, Tunis	2026 RAC Div. 1	
9	12 May 2026	Morocco	5	27	El Menzah Stadium, Tunis	2026 RAC Div. 1	
