= Elgon Cup (women's) =

Women's rugby union tournament

- Sport: Rugby union
- Founded: 2006
- Folded: 2019
- Replaced by: Rugby Africa Women's Cup
- No. of teams: 2
- Countries: Kenya; Uganda
- Most titles: Kenya (7 titles)

The women's Elgon Cup was an annual competition held between the national rugby union teams of Kenya and Uganda. It ran parallel with the men's Elgon Cup, which has been running since 2004. The cup was competed for over two legs - one in each country. Home matches for Kenya were usually played at the RFUEA Ground, Nairobi, Kenya, whilst Uganda usually played their home matches at the Kyadondo Grounds, Kampala, Uganda.

== History ==
In 2011, prior to the first leg, the Ugandan and Kenyan unions had agreed that the women’s Elgon cup would be a one off tie with the winners being crowned in Nairobi as the URU had insufficient funds to host the Kenyans in Kampala for the return leg. However, after the women’s game and the trophy being handed over to the Kenyans, the chairmen of both unions announced at the dinner that Uganda had secured late sponsorship and would be able to host the return leg that would determine the Elgon Cup winners. However, Kenya refused to hand over the Elgon Cup trophy after the second leg, claiming that they were the 2011 Elgon Cup champions as the 2nd leg was just a test friendly.

After a 3-year lull, the Elgon Cup returned in 2019, with the Kenyan Lionesses hosting the Uganda Lady Cranes in the first leg of the Cup at Mamboleo stadium in Kisumu.

== Summary ==
Year	Overall winner
2006	Uganda
2007	Tournament was cancelled
2008	Uganda
2009	Kenya
2010	Kenya
2011	Kenya
2012	Kenya
2013	Uganda
2014	Kenya
2015	Kenya
2016–18	Tournament was on hiatus
2019	Kenya
2020–22	Tournament was cancelled due to the COVID-19 pandemic in Africa
2023	Kenya

=== Matches ===
Venue	Played	Won by		Drawn
Venue	Played	Kenya	Uganda	Drawn
Kenya	11	9	1	1
Uganda	10	3	7	0
Overall	21	12	8	1

== 2006 ==
9 June 2006	Uganda	24–0	Kenya	Kampala

12 August 2006	Kenya	0–3	Uganda	Nairobi

Uganda win two matches to nil

== 2008 ==
24 May 2008	Uganda	18–7	Kenya	Kampala

16 August 2008	Kenya	15–13	Uganda	Nairobi

One match each - but Uganda retained the cup with an aggregate score of 31-22

== 2009 ==
15 August 2009	Kenya	38–5	Uganda	RFUEA Ground, Nairobi

29 August 2009	Uganda	12–5	Kenya	Kampala RC, Kampala

One match each - but Kenya wins the cup with an aggregate score of 43-17

== 2010 ==
3 July 2010	Uganda	8–5	Kenya	Kyadondo Rugby Club, Kampala
13:30 EAT (UTC+3)	Try: Fortunate Ivakunda 17' m Pen: Christine Kizito 39'		Try: Celestine Nasinde 27' m	Referee: George Collins (UGA)

10 July 2010	Kenya	16–8	Uganda	RFUEA Ground, Nairobi
				Referee: Constant Cap (KRU)

One match each - but Kenya wins the cup with an aggregate score of 21-16

== 2011 ==
9 July 2011	Kenya	22–10	Uganda	RFUEA Ground, Nairobi
14:00 EAT (UTC+3)	Try: Anita Omondi 5' m Millicent Cpala 31' m Celestine Nasinde (2) 48' c, 57' m Con: Millicent Cpala 49'; Cards: Philadelphia Olando (yellow card) 78' to 80'		Try: Charlotte Mudoola 28' m Helen Buteme 37' m	Referee: Gabriel Masenda (ZWE)

16 July 2011	Uganda	29–10	Kenya	Kyadondo Rugby Club, Kampala

Result disputed - but trophy awarded to Kenya following the result of the first match

== 2012 ==
21 April 2012	Uganda	15–6	Kenya	Kampala RC, Kampala

28 April 2012	Kenya	15–3	Uganda	RFUEA Ground, Nairobi

One match each - Kenya wins the cup 21-18 on aggregate

== 2013 ==
15 June 2013	Kenya	18–17	Uganda	Moi International Sports Centre, Nairobi

22 June 2013	Uganda	13–8	Kenya	Kyadondo Rugby Club, Kampala

One game each. Uganda win the Elgon Cup 30-26 on aggregate

== 2014 ==
12 July 2014	Uganda	15–33	Kenya	Kyadondo Rugby Club, Kampala

19 July 2014	Kenya	39–10	Uganda	RFUEA Ground, Nairobi

Kenya win the Elgon Cup two games to nil

== 2015 ==
13 June 2015	Kenya	5–5	Uganda	RFUEA Ground, Nairobi

20 June 2015	Uganda	6–7	Kenya	Legends Rugby Grounds, Kampala

Kenya win the Elgon Cup two games to nil

== 2019 ==
22 June 2019	Kenya	44–13	Uganda	Jomo Kenyatta International Stadium, Kisumu
13:30 EAT (UTC+3)	Try: Grace Okulu 18' m Philadelphia Olando (4) 22' c, 26' m, 47' m, 51' c Celestine Masinde 35' m Janet Okelo 39' m Stella Wafula 66' m Con: Irene Otieno (2) 22', 51'		Try: Charlotte Mudoola 71' m Winnie Atyang 79' m Pen: Charlotte Mudoola 58'	Attendance: 2000; Referee: Precious Pazani (ZWE)

13 July 2019	Uganda	5–35	Kenya	Kyadondo Rugby Club, Kampala
14:00 EAT (UTC+3)

Kenya win the Elgon Cup two games to nil

== 2023 ==
11 November 2023	Kenya	87–3	Uganda	Jomo Kenyatta International Stadium, Kisumu
14:00 EAT (UTC+3)	Try: Stella Wafula (3); Christabel Lindo (3); Sharon Auma; Diana Omosso; Phoebe Akinyi; Faith Livoi; Naomi Amuguni; Naomi Jelagat; Anne Goretti; Penalty Try; Con: Anne Goretti (6); Drop: Anne Goretti		Pen: Tina Okello; Cards: Emily Lekuru (yellow card) 26' to 36'

== See also ==
- Elgon Cup
- Women's international rugby
