= Christabel Lindo =

Kenyan rugby sevens player

Personal information
- Nationality: Kenyan
- Born: 22 September 1999 (age 25)

Sport
- Sport: Rugby sevens

Christabel Lindo (born 22 September 1999) is a Kenyan rugby sevens player. She competed in the women's tournament at the 2020 Summer Olympics.
