= 2019 Rugby Africa Women's Cup =

Tournament details
- Host: South Africa
- Venue: Bosman Stadium
- Date: 9 August 2019–17 August 2019
- Countries: South Africa; Kenya; Madagascar; Uganda
- Teams: 4

Final positions
- Champions: South Africa (1st title)
- Runner-up: Kenya
- Tries scored: 54

The 2019 Rugby Africa Women's Cup was the first edition of the Rugby Africa Women's Cup and was held in South Africa. It also doubled as a 2021 Rugby World Cup qualifier for the African continent. The tournament was played as a single round-robin at the Bosman Stadium in Brakpan from 9–17 August 2019. Four women's national teams competed.

South Africa was undefeated in their three matches and won direct entry to the 2021 World Cup. Kenya advanced to the cross-regional repechage play-off against the South American winner.

== Table ==
Pos	Team	P	W	D	L	PF	PA	PD	BP	Pts
1	South Africa	3	3	0	0	201	7	+194	3	15
2	Kenya	3	2	0	1	72	49	+23	2	10
3	Madagascar	3	0	1	2	20	123	-103	0	2
4	Uganda	3	0	1	2	27	141	-114	0	2

== Match results ==
=== Round 1 ===
9 August 2019	Madagascar	5–35	Kenya	Bosman Stadium, Brakpan
13:00 SAST (UTC+2)	Try: Veronique Rasoanekena 16' m Cards: Nanou Razafializay (yellow card) 74' to 80'		Try: Celestine Masinde (2) 20' m, 79' m Irene Otieno 35' m Philadelphia Olando 40' c Diana Ochieng 52' m Christabel Lindo 68' m Con: Janet Okello 40'; Pen: Evelyn Kalimera 74'; Cards: Janet Okello (yellow card) 62' to 72'	Referee: Saudah Adiru

9 August 2019	South Africa	89–7	Uganda	Bosman Stadium, Brakpan
15:00 SAST (UTC+2)	Try: Rights Mkhari (3) 1' m, 5' c, 18' m Sinazo Mcatshulwa (2) 10' m, 62' c Zintle Mpupha (2) 15' c, 30' c Babalwa Latsha 22' c Ayanda Malinga 26' m Yonela Ngxingolo 35' c Eloise Webb (3) 38' c, 42' m, 67' m Snenhlanhla Shozi (2) 54' m, 80' m Con: Tayla Kinsey (6) 5', 15', 22', 30', 35', 38'; Snenhlanhla Shozi 62'		Try: Samiya Ajikoru 73' c Con: Samiya Ajikoru 73'; Cards: Hellen Gizamba (yellow card) 33' to 43'	Referee: Precious Pazani

=== Round 2 ===
13 August 2019	Kenya	37–5	Uganda	Bosman Stadium, Brakpan
13:00 SAST (UTC+2)	Try: Janet Okello (3) 43' m, 49' c, 60' m Grace Okulu (2) 72' m, 76' m Sheilla Chajira 80'+2 c Con: Grace Okulu 49'; Janet Owino 80'+2; Pen: Grace Okulu 17'		Try: Samiya Ajikoru 61' m Cards: Juliet Nandawula (yellow card) 70' to 80'	Referee: Ashleigh Murray-Pretorius

13 August 2019	Madagascar	0–73	South Africa	Bosman Stadium, Brakpan
15:00 SAST (UTC+2)	Cards: Andoniaina Randrianarijaona (yellow card) 80' to 80'		Try: Eloise Webb 4' m Rights Mkhari (3) 10' m, 16' m, 32' c Snenhlanhla Shozi (2) 21' m, 30' m Aseza Hele (2) 38' c, 58' c Ayanda Malinga (2) 41' m, 48' m Zintle Mpupha 42' c Aphiwe Ngwevu (2) 63' m, 70' m Con: Tayla Kinsey (4) 33', 39', 43', 59'	Referee: Saudah Adiru

=== Round 3 ===
17 August 2019	Madagascar	15–15	Uganda	Bosman Stadium, Brakpan
13:00 SAST (UTC+2)	Try: Monica Rasoloniaina 43' m Patricia Ravololonirina 60' c Con: Fabrina Holiniaina 61'; Pen: Fabrina Holiniaina 28'		Try: Juliet Nandawula 20' c Rosenburg Kanyunyuzi 70' m Con: Mary Kyoita 21'; Pen: Mary Kyoita 58'; Cards: Irene Nzige (yellow card) 36' to 46'	Referee: Ashleigh Murray-Pretorius

17 August 2019	South Africa	39–0	Kenya	Bosman Stadium, Brakpan
15:00 SAST (UTC+2)	Try: Zintle Mpupha 4' c Lindelwa Gwala 8' c Tayla Kinsey 14' m Snenhlanhla Shozi 23' m Aseza Hele 67' m Mathrin Simmers 75' m Rights Mkhari 79' m Con: Tayla Kinsey (2) 5', 9'			Referee: Precious Pazani
