= Namibia women's national rugby union team =

Namibia
- Union: Namibia Rugby Union
- Head coach: Christel Janet Kotze

World Rugby ranking
- Current: 66 (as of 2 March 2026)
- Highest: 57
- Lowest: 66 (2026)

First international
- Namibia 31–10 Botswana (Hage Geingob Rugby Stadium, Windhoek; 19 October 2013)

Biggest win
- Namibia 31–10 Botswana (Hage Geingob Rugby Stadium, Windhoek; 19 October 2013)

Biggest defeat
- South Africa 128–3 Namibia (City Park, Cape Town; 23 June 2022)

The Namibia women's national rugby union team are a national sports team that represents Namibia in women's international rugby union. They played their first test match in 2013.

== History ==
Namibia played their first test match against Botswana on 19 October 2013 in Windhoek, Namibia. They were absent from the international scene for eight years before playing their second test against Zambia on 13 November 2021 at Windhoek.

Namibia competed at the 2022 Rugby Africa Women's Cup and were grouped with South Africa and Zimbabwe in Pool A. They lost both matches, Zimbabwe thrashed them 72–0 and South Africa crossed the try line a record 20 times with a score of 128–3.

== Results summary ==
(Full internationals only, updated to 24 April 2023)

Namibia Internationals From 2013
Opponent	First Match	Played	Won	Drawn	Lost	For	Against	Win %
Botswana	2013	1	1	0	0	31	10	100.00%
South Africa	2022	1	0	0	1	3	128	0.00%
Zambia	2021	1	0	0	1	5	75	0.00%
Zimbabwe	2022	1	0	0	1	0	72	0.00%
Summary	2013	4	1	0	3	39	285	25.00%

== Results ==
=== Full internationals ===
Won	Lost	Draw

Test	Date	Opponent	Score	Venue	Event	Ref
1	19 October 2013	Botswana	31–10	Hage Geingob Rugby Stadium, Windhoek	Test	
2	13 November 2021	Zambia	5–75	Hage Geingob Rugby Stadium, Windhoek	2021 Africa Cup	
3	19 June 2022	Zimbabwe	0–72	City Park, Cape Town	2022 Africa Cup	
4	23 June 2022	South Africa	3–128	City Park, Cape Town	2022 Africa Cup	
