= 2026 Rugby Africa Women's Cup Division 1 =

Tournament details
- Host: Tunisia
- Venue: Tunis
- Date: 8–16 May 2026
- Countries: Ivory Coast; Tunisia; Morocco
- Teams: 3

Final positions
- Champions: Tunisia (1st title)
- Runner-up: Morocco

Tournament statistics
- Matches played: 3

The 2026 Rugby Africa Women's Cup Division 1 was the second edition of the Women's Division 1 tournament and a qualifier for the 2027 Rugby Africa Women's Cup. The event will be held at Tunis, Tunisia from 8 to 16 May 2026.

Tunisia secured promotion to the 2026 Rugby Africa Women's Cup after defeating Morocco and Ivory Coast in the round robin tournament.

== Venue ==
2026 Rugby Africa Women's Cup Division 1 is located in Tunisia	Tunis
2026 Rugby Africa Women's Cup Division 1 is located in Tunisia	Chedly Zouiten Stadium
2026 Rugby Africa Women's Cup Division 1 is located in Tunisia	Capacity: 18,000

== Standings ==
Pos	Team	Pld	W	D	L	PF	PA	PD	TF	TA	TB	LB	Pts	Qualification
1	Tunisia	2	2	0	0	139	0	+139	0	0	2	0	10	2027 Africa Women's Cup
2	Morocco	2	1	0	1	27	59	−32	0	0	1	0	5	
3	Ivory Coast	2	0	0	2	5	112	−107	0	0	0	0	0	

== Matches ==
=== Tunisia vs Ivory Coast ===
8 May 2026
15:30 CET (UTC+1)

Tunisia	85–0	Ivory Coast
	Report

Chedly Zouiten Stadium, Tunis

=== Morocco vs Ivory Coast ===
12 May 2026
15:30 CET (UTC+1)

Morocco	27–5	Ivory Coast
	Report

Chedly Zouiten Stadium, Tunis

=== Tunisia vs Ivory Coast ===
16 May 2026
15:30 CET (UTC+1)

Tunisia	54–0	Morocco

Chedly Zouiten Stadium, Tunis
