= 2025 Rugby Africa Women's Cup Division 1 =

Tournament details
- Host: Ivory Coast
- Venue: San-Pédro
- Date: 11–19 April 2025
- Countries: Ivory Coast; Tunisia; Uganda; Zimbabwe
- Teams: 4

Final positions
- Champions: Uganda
- Runner-up: Tunisia

Tournament statistics
- Matches played: 6

The 2025 Rugby Africa Women's Cup Division 1 was the first edition of the Women's Division 1 tournament and a qualifier for the 2025 Rugby Africa Women's Cup. The event was held at Stade Auguste-Denis in San-Pédro, Ivory Coast from 11 to 19 April 2025.

Uganda secured promotion to the 2025 Rugby Africa Women's Cup after defeating Zimbabwe in the final match.

== Venue ==
2025 Rugby Africa Women's Cup Division 1 is located in Ivory Coast	San-Pédro
2025 Rugby Africa Women's Cup Division 1 is located in Ivory Coast	Stade Auguste Denise
2025 Rugby Africa Women's Cup Division 1 is located in Ivory Coast	Capacity: 8,000

== Standings ==
Pos	Team	Pld	W	D	L	PF	PA	PD	TF	TA	TB	LB	Pts	Qualification
1	Uganda	3	3	0	0	142	17	+125	25	3	3	0	15	2025 Africa Women's Cup
2	Tunisia	3	2	0	1	71	51	+20	13	9	2	0	10	
3	Zimbabwe	3	1	0	2	77	98	−21	12	16	2	1	7	
4	Ivory Coast	3	0	0	3	8	132	−124	1	23	0	0	0	

Source: Rugby Africa

== Fixtures ==
=== Round 1 ===
11 April 2025	(1BP) Uganda	27–10	Tunisia	Stade Auguste Denise, San-Pédro
14:00 GMT (UTC+0)	Try: Peace Lekuru (3) 9' m, 20' m, 61' c Lydia Namabiro 25' m Angella Nanyonjo 33' m Con: Bushira Namutebi 62'; Cards: Janati Nandudu (yellow card) 55'	report	Try: Zaineb Dabki 40' m Yasmine Korbi 53' m Cards: Habiba Lafi (yellow card) 31'	Referee: Bineta Sene (SEN)

11 April 2025	(1BP) Zimbabwe	46–8	Ivory Coast	Stade Auguste Denise, San-Pédro
16:00 GMT (UTC+0)	Try: Pauline Sianga 39' m Rufaro Tagarira (2) 51' c, 71' m Chiwoniso Emelda Mabika 64' m Ruvimbo Mudyanadzo (2) 66' c, 80' c Nokuthaba Mzizi 77' c Con: Precious Chirinda (2) 51', 67'; Rufaro Tagarira (2) 78', 80'; Pen: Tarren Munodaani 29'	report	Try: Mariam Zon 21' m Pen: Julie Bleu 32'; Cards: Anne N'Dri (yellow card) 6'; Julie Bleu (yellow card) 7'; Fatoumata Cisse (yellow card) 33'; Nambalo Cisse (yellow card) 63'	Referee: Mercy Dudi (KRU)

=== Round 2 ===
15 April 2025	(2BP) Zimbabwe	24–27	Tunisia (1BP)	Stade Auguste Denise, San-Pédro
14:00 GMT (UTC+0)	Try: Ruvimbo Mudyanadzo (2) 24' m, 77' c Rufaro Tagarira 60' m Nokutenda Shoriwa 69' c Con: Precious Kudzanai Chirinda 70'; Pauline Sianga 77'	report	Try: Lamia Mlawah 12' m Sameh Lahouel 26' m Falfoul Sandaise 31' c Ben Charrada Halima 72' m Habiba Lafi 80' m Con: Nour Ayari 31'	Referee: Victor Ojuku (KRU)

15 April 2025	(1BP) Uganda	52–0	Ivory Coast	Stade Auguste Denise, San-Pédro
16:00 GMT (UTC+0)	Try: Grace Auma (2) 23' m, 54' m Peace Lekuru (3) 37' m, 45' m, 65' m Bushira Namutebi 41' m Lydia Namabiro 47' c Sarah Nakafeero 62' m Comfort Anganyika 71' m Christine Kokoi 77' m Con: Bushira Namutebi 48'; Cards: Suzan Adong (yellow card) 25'	report	Cards: Celestine Guei (yellow card) 26'; Adeline Lamoine (yellow card) 32'; Fatoumata Cisse (yellow card) 40'	Referee: Youness Marfoq (FRMR)

=== Round 3 ===
19 April 2025	(1BP) Tunisia	34–0	Ivory Coast	Stade Auguste Denise, San-Pédro
10:00 GMT (UTC+0)	Try: Chtioui Zahra 5' c Ranim Madouri (2) 13' c, 40' c Oumayma Dziri 47' c Yasmine Korbi 53' m Ahed Ragoubi 58' m Con: Nour Ayari (4) 5', 14', 40', 47'	report	Cards: Maraim Sanogo (yellow card) 50'; Germaine Folly (yellow card) 66'	Referee: Mercy Dudi (KRU)

19 April 2025	Zimbabwe	7–63	Uganda (1BP)	Stade Auguste Denise, San-Pédro
12:00 GMT (UTC+0)	Try: Chiwoniso Emelda Mabika 41' c Con: Precious Kudzanai Chirinda 42'; Cards: Ruvimbo Mudyanadzo (yellow card) 15'; Hazel Njaya (yellow card) 60'; Fadzai Mandizha (yellow card) 73'	report	Try: Lydia Namabiro (4) 16' c, 40' c, 47' c, 78' c Peace Lekuru (3) 29' c, 35' m, 56' m Agnes Nakuya 50' m Grace Auma 69' m Yvonne Najjuma 76' m Con: Bushira Namutebi (5) 16', 29', 40', 47', 78'; Pen: Bushira Namutebi 4'	Referee: Bineta Sene (SEN)
