= Tunisia women's national rugby union team =

Tunisia
- Union: Tunisian Rugby Federation
First colours	Second colours

World Rugby ranking
- Current: 36 (as of 2 March 2026)
- Highest: 30 (2024)
- Lowest: 37 (2025)

First international
- Tunisia 14–3 Senegal (Stade El Menzah, Tunis; 9 October 2021)

Biggest win
- Tunisia 85–0 Ivory Coast (El Menzah Stadium, Tunis; 8 May 2026)

Biggest defeat
- Tunisia 5–27 Madagascar (Stade El Menzah, Tunis; 22 October 2022)

The Tunisia women's national rugby union team are a national sporting side that represents Tunisia in rugby union. They played their first international test against Senegal on 9 October 2021.

== History ==
Tunisia played their first test match against Senegal, who were also playing their first test, on 9 October 2021. Tunisia won the match 14–3 at Stade El Menzah in Tunis. They recorded their biggest victory in their 61–0 thrashing of the Ivory Coast in their second test.

Tunisia also competed at the 2022 Rugby Africa Women's Cup. In 2023, they won the test series against Uganda in a clean sweep at the El Menzah Stadium in Tunis. They won the first test 26–17 and easily won the rematch five days later, 53–13. They moved up two ranks to their all-time best position of 31.

They were runners-up at the 2025 Rugby Africa Women's Cup Division 1 tournament that was held at Stade Auguste-Denis in San-Pédro, Ivory Coast.

== Results summary ==
(Full internationals only, updated to 16 May 2026)

Tunisia Internationals From 2021
Opponent	First Match	Played	Won	Drawn	Lost	Win %
Ivory Coast	2021	3	3	0	0	100%
Madagascar	2022	1	0	0	1	0%
Morocco	2026	1	1	0	0	100%
Senegal	2021	2	2	0	0	100%
Uganda	2023	3	2	0	1	66.7%
Zimbabwe	2025	1	1	0	0	100%
Summary	2021	9	7	0	2	77.8%

== Results ==
=== Full internationals ===
Won	Lost	Draw

Test	Date	Opponent	PF	PA	Venue	Tournament	Ref
1	2021-10-09	Senegal	14	3	Stade El Menzah, Tunis	2021 Africa Cup	
2	2021-10-17	Ivory Coast	61	0	Stade El Menzah, Tunis	2021 Africa Cup	
3	2022-10-14	Senegal	24	7	Stade El Menzah, Tunis	2022 Africa Cup	
4	2022-10-22	Madagascar	5	27	Stade El Menzah, Tunis	2022 Africa Cup	
5	2023-11-22	Uganda	26	17	Stade El Menzah, Tunis		
6	2023-11-27	Uganda	53	13	Stade El Menzah, Tunis		
7	2025-04-11	Uganda	10	27	Stade Auguste-Denis, San-Pédro	2025 RAC Div 1	
8	2025-04-15	Zimbabwe	27	24	Stade Auguste-Denis, San-Pédro	2025 RAC Div 1	
9	2025-04-19	Ivory Coast	34	0	Stade Auguste-Denis, San-Pédro	2025 RAC Div 1	
10	2026-05-08	Ivory Coast	85	0	El Menzah Stadium, Tunis	2026 RAC Div 1	
11	2026-05-12	Morocco	54	0	El Menzah Stadium, Tunis	2026 RAC Div 1	
