= Zambia women's national rugby union team =

Zambia
- Union: Zambia Rugby Union
First colours

World Rugby ranking
- Current: 51 (as of 2 March 2026)
- Highest: 39 (2024)
- Lowest: 51 (2026)

First international
- Zimbabwe 0–28 Zambia (Harare; 22 September 2007)

Biggest win
- Namibia 5–75 Zambia (Hage Geingob Rugby Stadium, Windhoek; 13 November 2021)

Biggest defeat
- Uganda 36–17 Zambia (Muteesa II Wankulukuku Stadium, Kampala; 25 October 2022)

The Zambia women's national rugby union team are a national sporting side of Zambia, representing them at rugby union. The side first played in 2007.

== History ==
Zambia played their first international test match against Zimbabwe in 2007. In 2019, They played Zimbabwe twice and won the Victoria Cup.

In 2021, Zambia and Namibia faced each other for the first time. Zambia thrashed Namibia 75–5 at Windhoek.

== Results summary ==
(Full internationals only, updated to 22 April 2023)

Zambia Internationals From 2007
Opponent	First Match	Played	Won	Drawn	Lost	For	Against	Win %
Kenya	2022	1	0	0	1	17	36	0.00%
Namibia	2021	1	1	0	0	75	5	100.00%
Uganda	2022	1	0	0	1	17	36	0.00%
Zimbabwe	2007	3	3	0	0	68	33	100.00%
Summary	2007	6	4	0	2	177	110	66.67%

== Results ==
=== Full internationals ===
Won	Lost	Draw

Test	Date	PF	PA	Opponent	Venue	Event	Ref
1	22 September 2007	28	0	Zimbabwe	Harare	Test	
2	13 July 2019	19	18	Zimbabwe	Harare Sports Club, Harare	Test	
3	14 September 2019	21	15	Zimbabwe	Chester Dean Arena, Lusaka	Test	
4	13 November 2021	75	5	Namibia	Hage Geingob Rugby Stadium, Windhoek	2021 Africa Cup	
5	25 October 2022	17	36	Uganda	Muteesa II Wankulukuku Stadium, Kampala	2022 Africa Cup	
6	29 October 2022	17	36	Kenya	Muteesa II Wankulukuku Stadium, Kampala	2022 Africa Cup	

=== Other matches ===
Date	Zambia	PF	PA	Opponent	Venue	Ref
2017-06-03	Zambia XV	0	39	Zimbabwe Sables	Police Ground, Harare	
2018-07-11	Zambia XV	19	18	Zimbabwe XV	Mufulira	
2018-07-15	Zambia XV	7	3	Zimbabwe XV	Mufulira	
2021-06-02	Zambia XV	31	22	Zimbabwe XV	Harare	
2021-06-05	Zambia XV	38	17	Zimbabwe XV	Harare	
