= Lusanda Dumke =

South African rugby union player (1996–2025)

- Born: 11 September 1996 East London, South Africa
- Died: 16 December 2025 (aged 29) East London, South Africa
- Height: 1.66 m (5 ft 5 in)
- Weight: 68 kg (150 lb)

Rugby union career
- Position: Flanker
Senior career
Years	Team	Apps	(Points)
–2023	Border Bulldogs		
2023–2025	Bulls Daisies		
International career
Years	Team	Apps	(Points)
2018–2025	South Africa	33	(50)

Lusanda Dumke (11 September 1996 – 16 December 2025) was a South African professional rugby union player who played as flanker.

== Biography ==
Lusanda Dumke was born on 11 September 1996.

In 2022, she played for the Border Bulldogs. She had only two caps for South Africa when she was selected in September 2022 to play in the World Cup in New Zealand.

She retired from her international career due to health concerns. Dumke died of a rare form of stomach cancer in East London, on 16 December 2025, aged 29.

President Cyril Ramaphosa has given his full approval for a special provincial funeral in her honour. The funeral will take place on 28 December 2025 beginning with a private family service, followed by a public ceremony in KwaCentane, Eastern Cape.
