= Cameroon women's national rugby union team =

Rugby union team representing Cameroon

Cameroon
- Nickname: Indomitable Lionesses
- Union: Cameroonian Rugby Federation
- Head coach: Alfred Daniel Bisso
- Captain: Mimosette Mouto

World Rugby ranking
- Current: 37 (as of 2 March 2026)
- Highest: 31 (2023)
- Lowest: 38 (2025)

First international
- Cameroon 37–0 Burkina Faso (9 June 2021)

Biggest win
- Cameroon 52–0 Burkina Faso (8 November 2022)

Biggest defeat
- Cameroon 0–87 South Africa (20 May 2023)

The Cameroon women's national rugby union team are a national sports team that represents Cameroon in women's international rugby union. They played their first test match against Burkina Faso in 2021.

== History ==
Cameroon made their test debut against Burkina Faso on 9 June 2021 at Stade du 4 Août. They won both tests in the series against Burkina Faso in Ouagadougou.

Cameroon competed at the 2022 Rugby Africa Women's Cup. They hosted Burkina Faso and the Ivory Coast at Stade Omnisport Paul Biya in Yaoundé for Pool D of the competition. They topped the pool and advanced to the final stage.

On 20 May 2023, Cameroon experienced their first loss when they were routed 87–0 by South Africa in the opening match of the Rugby Africa Women's Cup in Antananarivo, Madagascar.

== Record ==
=== Overall ===
| Opponent | First game | Played | Won | Drawn | Lost | Win % |
|---|---|---|---|---|---|---|
| Burkina Faso | 2021 | 3 | 3 | 0 | 0 | 100% |
| Ivory Coast | 2022 | 1 | 1 | 0 | 0 | 100% |
| Kenya | 2023 | 2 | 0 | 0 | 2 | 0.00% |
| Madagascar | 2023 | 2 | 0 | 0 | 2 | 0.00% |
| South Africa | 2023 | 2 | 0 | 0 | 2 | 0.00% |
| Summary | | 10 | 4 | 0 | 6 | 44.44% |

=== Full Internationals ===
| Won | Lost | Draw |

| Test | Date | Opponent | PF | PA | Venue | Tournament |
|---|---|---|---|---|---|---|
| 1 | 9 June 2021 | Burkina Faso | 37 | 0 | Stade du 4 Août, Ouagadougou | 2021 Rugby Africa Series |
| 2 | 12 June 2021 | Burkina Faso | 35 | 3 | Stade du 4 Août, Ouagadougou | 2021 Rugby Africa Series |
| 3 | 8 November 2022 | Ivory Coast | 8 | 0 | Stade Omnisport Paul Biya, Yaoundé | 2022 Rugby Africa Cup |
| 4 | 12 November 2022 | Burkina Faso | 52 | 0 | Stade Omnisport Paul Biya, Yaoundé | 2022 Rugby Africa Cup |
| 5 | 20 May 2023 | South Africa | 0 | 87 | Stade Makis, Antananarivo | 2023 Rugby Africa Cup |
| 6 | 24 May 2023 | Madagascar | 10 | 30 | Stade Makis, Antananarivo | 2023 Rugby Africa Cup |
| 7 | 28 May 2023 | Kenya | 3 | 52 | Stade Makis, Antananarivo | 2023 Rugby Africa Cup |
| 8 | 4 May 2024 | South Africa | 0 | 55 | Stade Makis, Antananarivo | 2024 Rugby Africa Cup |
| 9 | 8 May 2024 | Madagascar | 5 | 12 | Stade Makis, Antananarivo | 2024 Rugby Africa Cup |
| 10 | 12 May 2024 | Kenya | 17 | 39 | Stade Makis, Antananarivo | 2024 Rugby Africa Cup |
