= Olembe Stadium =

Stadium in Yaoundé, Cameroon

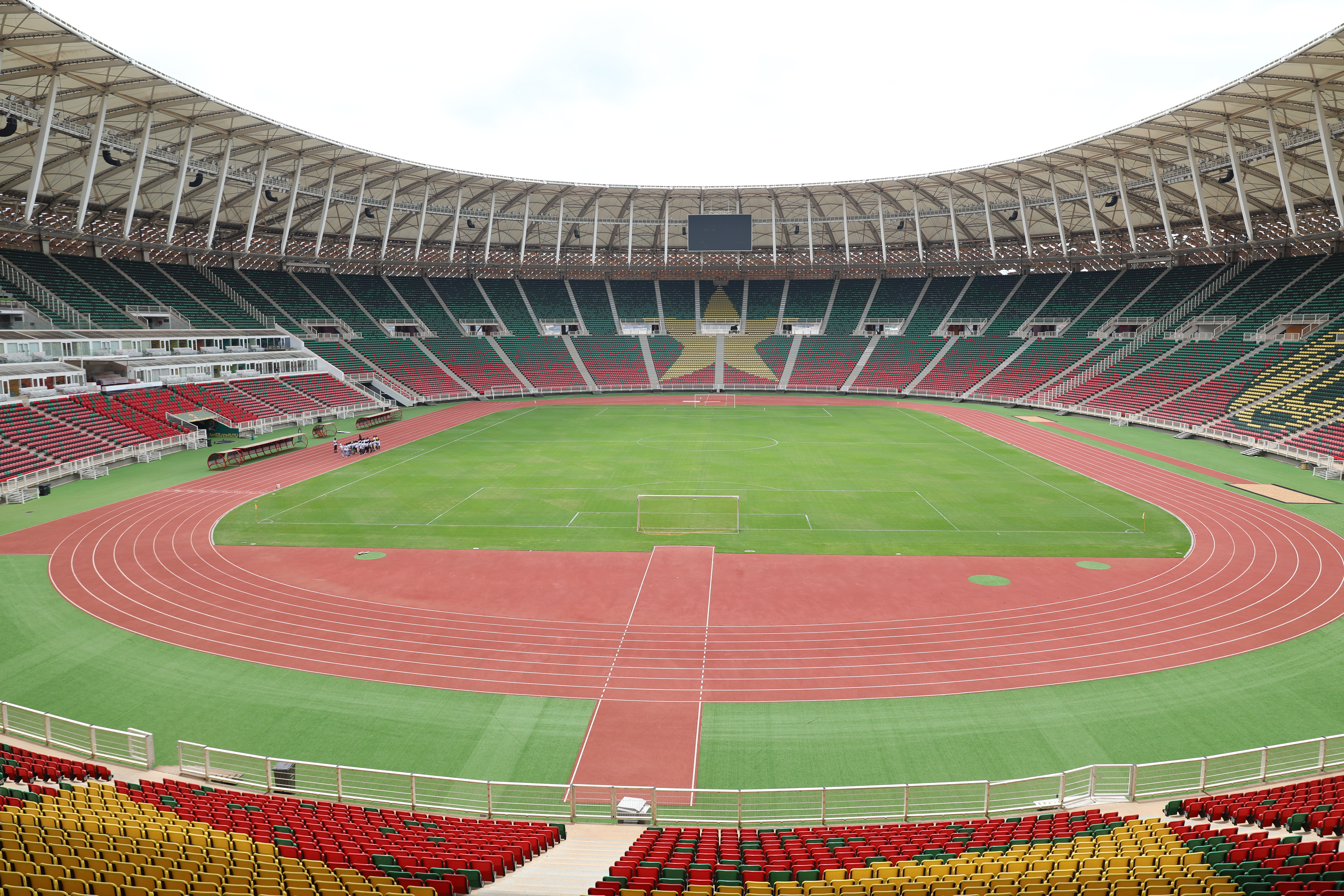
- CAF
- Interactive map of Olembe Stadium
- Full name: Stade Omnisport Paul Biya
- Location: Olembe, Yaoundé, Cameroon
- Coordinates: 03°57′03″N 11°32′26″E
- Owner: Cameroonian Football Federation
- Capacity: 60,000
- Surface: Grass
- Scoreboard: Yes
- Field size: 105 m × 68 m (344 ft × 223 ft)

Construction
- Built: 2018–2021
- Opened: 3 September 2021; 5 years ago
- Cost: 163 billion CFA
- Architect: Studio SHESA architects - arch. Suarez
- Structural engineer: MJW structures
- Services engineer: Beta Progetti
- General contractor: Gruppo Piccini S.A.

Tenant
- Cameroon national football team (2021–present)

Paul Biya Omnisports Stadium (named for the long-ruling president of Cameroon), referred to as the Olembe Stadium and Sport Complex (Stade d'Olembé), is a multi-purpose stadium spanning 84 acres (400,000 sq.m) in Olembé locality, Yaoundé. It is the largest stadium in Cameroon by capacity, holding 60,000 spectators, and is the 9th-largest stadium in Africa by the same measure. Located roughly 13 km from Yaoundé city-centre, the stadium is part of a complex which includes two annex stadia training grounds; a gymnasium with handball, basketball, volleyball and tennis courts; an Olympic-size swimming pool; a shopping mall, museum and cinema; and 5-star hotel with 70 rooms available.

Olembe Stadium was one of the locations chosen to host the 2021 Africa Cup of Nations held in Cameroon, which took place in 2022 because of pandemic-related postponements. It held the opening ceremony and game – which the Cameroon team won 2–1 against Burkina Faso – and the closing ceremony and final, which was held between Senegal and Egypt; Senegal won the tournament.

== Construction and Development ==
As Minister of Sports and Physical Education, Prof. Narcisse Mouelle Kombi oversaw the project.

The stadium's official construction cost is put at around $284 million (163 billion CFA) following some financing controversy. The complex is reported to have encouraged the development of other otherwise unutilised areas, with new roads, eating and drinking establishments, hostels, and play grounds among other facilities.

The intended official delivery of first-phase construction, including the main stadium, when the Cameroonian Football Federation would take ownership of the facility, was meant to occur on 30 November 2021, postponed first to 3 December 2021, but was postponed again. The Confederation of African Football (CAF) had expressed concerns throughout the construction process about the pace of completion.

The second-phase of construction, covering the swimming pool and other sports courts, is intended to be completed after the end of AFCON.

The steel-roof of the main stadium, which is decorated in the colours of Cameroon's flag, was designed by Maeg, who specialise in steel structures.

The first match held at the Stadium was on 3 September 2021: a FIFA World Cup African Qualifier game between Cameroon and Malawi, which Cameroon won 2–0.

== 2022 Africa Cup of Nations Tragedy ==
Before a Round of 16 match between Cameroon and Comoros, a deadly crowd crush occurred at one of the stadium's entrance gates, killing eight people and injuring thirty-eight. The following game was moved to Ahmadou Ahidjo Stadium. The disaster reignited the long-time debate about security and safety in Africa's stadiums.

Preceded by Cairo International Stadium; Cairo	Africa Cup of Nations; Final venue 2021	Succeeded by Alassane Ouattara Stadium; Abidjan
