= Zimbabwe women's national rugby union team =

Sports team

Zimbabwe
- Nickname: Lady Sables
- Union: Zimbabwe Rugby Union
- Head coach: Munyaradzi Mhonda
First colours

World Rugby ranking
- Current: 54 (as of 2 March 2026)
- Highest: 49 (2023)
- Lowest: 54 (2026)

First international
- Zimbabwe 0–28 Zambia (Harare; 22 September 2007)

Biggest win
- Zimbabwe 72–0 Namibia (City Park, Cape Town; 19 June 2022)

Biggest defeat
- South Africa 108–0 Zimbabwe (City Park, Cape Town; 15 June 2022)

The Zimbabwe women's national rugby union team are a national sporting side of Zimbabwe, representing them at rugby union. The side first played in 2007.

== History ==
Zimbabwe's women's team are known as the Lady Sables. They played mostly friendlies with Zambia and Botswana before they played their first international test match on 22 September 2007 against Zambia at the Harare Sports Club.

They competed at the 2025 Rugby Africa Women's Cup Division 1 tournament that was held at Stade Auguste-Denis in San-Pédro, Ivory Coast.

== Results summary ==
(Full internationals only, updated to 19 April 2025)

Zimbabwe Internationals From 2007
| Opponent | First Match | Played | Won | Drawn | Lost | For | Against | Win % |
|---|---|---|---|---|---|---|---|---|
| Botswana | 2017 | 1 | 1 | 0 | 0 | 10 | 5 | 100% |
| Ivory Coast | 2025 | 1 | 1 | 0 | 0 | 46 | 8 | 100% |
| Namibia | 2022 | 1 | 1 | 0 | 0 | 72 | 0 | 100% |
| South Africa | 2022 | 1 | 0 | 0 | 1 | 0 | 108 | 0% |
| Tunisia | 2025 | 1 | 0 | 0 | 1 | 24 | 27 | 0% |
| Uganda | 2021 | 3 | 0 | 0 | 3 | 10 | 138 | 0% |
| Zambia | 2007 | 3 | 0 | 0 | 3 | 33 | 68 | 0% |
| Summary | 2007 | 11 | 3 | 0 | 8 | 195 | 354 | 27.3% |
