= Aphiwe Ngwevu =

South African rugby union player

- Born: 14 May 1998 (age 28)
- Height: 168 cm (5 ft 6 in)
- Weight: 86 kg (190 lb)

Rugby union career
- Position: Centre
International career
Years	Team	Apps	(Points)
2019–	South Africa	31	(70)
- Correct as of 14 September 2025

Aphiwe Ngwevu (born 14 May 1998) is a South African international rugby union player playing as a centre.

== Biography ==
Aphiwe Ngwevu was born on 14 May 1998. In 2022, she plays for the Border Ladies club in East London. She had 12 caps for the South African national team when she was selected in September 2022 to play for her country in the World Cup in New Zealand.

She was named in South Africa's squad to the 2025 Women's Rugby World Cup in England.
