= Madagascan Rugby Federation =

Sports governing body

The Madagascan Rugby Federation (French: Fédération Malagasy de Rugby) is the governing body for rugby union in Madagascar. It is a inaugural member of the Confederation of African Rugby (CAR) and a member of the International Rugby Board.

== See also ==
- Rugby union in Madagascar
- Madagascar national rugby union team
- Madagascar national rugby sevens team
- Madagascar women's national rugby sevens team
