= Madagascar women's national rugby union team =

Madagascar
- Nickname: The Ladies Makis
- Union: Madagascan Rugby Federation

World Rugby ranking
- Current: 33 (as of 23 March 2026)
- Highest: 25 (2024)
- Lowest: 33 (2026)

First international
- Madagascar 5–35 Kenya (Bosman Stadium, Brakpan; 9 August 2019)

Biggest win
- Tunisia 5–27 Madagascar (Stade El Menzah, Tunis; 22 October 2022)

Biggest defeat
- Spain 83–0 Madagascar (The Sevens Stadium, Dubai; 27 September 2024)

The Madagascar women's national rugby union team are a national sports team that represents Madagascar in women's international rugby union. They made their test debut against Kenya in 2019.

== History ==
Madagascar made their international debut against Kenya on 9 August at the Bosman Stadium in Brakpan. It was the opening match of the 2019 Rugby Africa Women's Cup competition. They lost their second test match 73–0 to the Springbok women who kept them scoreless in their biggest loss so far. In their third test, they held Uganda to a 15-all draw.

Madagascar recorded their first win when they defeated Kenya 27–15, it was the first game in a two-test series. They scored two tries and kept Kenya scoreless in their second test in Nairobi as they clinched the series.

Madagascar topped Pool C at the 2022 Rugby Africa Women's Cup and qualified for the final stage with wins over Tunisia and Senegal. In 2024, they were runners-up at the Rugby Africa Women's Cup and qualified for their first WXV tournament.

== Record ==
(Full internationals only, updated to 11 October 2024)

Madagascar Internationals From 2019
Opponent	First Match	Played	Won	Drawn	Lost	Win %
Cameroon	2023	2	2	0	0	100.00%
Hong Kong	2024	1	0	0	1	0.00%
Kenya	2019	6	3	0	3	50.00%
Samoa	2024	1	0	0	1	0.00%
Senegal	2022	1	1	0	0	100.00%
South Africa	2019	2	0	0	2	0.00%
Spain	2024	1	0	0	1	0.00%
Tunisia	2022	1	1	0	0	100.00%
Uganda	2019	1	0	1	0	0.00%
Summary		16	7	1	8	43.75%

== Players ==
Madagascar announced their 30-player squad on 16 September 2024 for the WXV 3 tournament.

Player	Position	Date of birth (age)	Caps	Club/province
Oliviane Yvanah Andriatsilavina	Second row	9 June 2005 (aged 19)	7	(Madagascar) SCB Besarety
Marie Bodonandrianina	Centre	16 March 1997 (aged 27)	7	(Madagascar) FTFA
Felana Rakotoarison	Second row	21 January 1993 (aged 31)	3	(Madagascar) FTM Manjakaray
Laurence Rasoanandrasana	Hooker	6 December 1992 (aged 31)	9	(Madagascar) SCB Besarety
Claudia Rasoarimalala	Wing	7 August 1985 (aged 39)	12	(Madagascar) FTFA
Tiana Razanamahefa	Fullback	26 May 2000 (aged 24)	4	(Madagascar) SCB Besarety
Sousou	??			(Madagascar) FTFA
Rojo	??			(Madagascar) FTFA
Mamisoa Rasoarimalala	Prop	5 April 1993 (aged 31)	7	(Madagascar) FTM Manjakaray
Joela Mirasoa Fenohasina	Scrum-half	1 March 1995 (aged 29)	9	(Madagascar) FTFA
Olivia Hanitriniaina	??	11 April 2000 (aged 24)	3	(Madagascar) 3FB Fahasalamana
Eleonore Rasoanantenaina	Second row	11 October 1987 (aged 36)	7	(Madagascar) FTM Manjakaray
Mialy Ravaoarinoro	Back row	26 May 1993 (aged 31)	4	(Madagascar) 3FB Fahasalamana
Aina Rakotozafy	Hooker	8 December 1994 (aged 29)	7	(Madagascar) ASUT
Vonjy	??			(Madagascar) 3FB Fahasalamana
Vachilly	??			(Madagascar) Rugby Club Tanora Soavimasoandro
Voahirana Razafiarisoa	Fly-half	1 September 1986 (aged 38)	9	(Madagascar) 3FB Fahasalamana
Sariaka Nomenjanahary	Back row	30 May 1996 (aged 28)	9	(Madagascar) SCB Besarety
Elinah	??			(Madagascar) Rugby Club Tanora Soavimasoandro
Miora Rabarivelo	Prop	18 July 1989 (aged 35)	8	(Madagascar) SCB Besarety
Vonjimalala Ranorovololona	Scrum-half	7 January 1991 (aged 33)	7	(Madagascar) SCB Besarety
Delphine Raharimalala	Back row	30 April 1994 (aged 30)	11	(Madagascar) SCB Besarety
Nanou Razafializay	Prop	28 February 1993 (aged 31)	9	(Madagascar) SCB Besarety
Erickah Razanakiniana	Fly-half	26 March 2004 (aged 20)	0	(Madagascar) SCB Besarety
Nomenjanahary Rakotozafy	Hooker	8 December 1994 (aged 29)	1	(Madagascar) SCB Besarety
Fenitra Razafindramanga	Prop	22 November 1999 (aged 24)	9	(Madagascar) FTM Manjakaray
Zaya Fanantenana	Wing	10 February 2003 (aged 21)	5	(Madagascar) SCB Besarety
Veronique Rasoanekena	Centre	17 June 1997 (aged 27)	9	(Madagascar) Rugby Club Tanora Soavimasoandro
Sarindra Sahondramalala	Back row	4 March 1993 (aged 31)	3	(Madagascar) 3FB Fahasalamana
Volatiana Rasoanandrasana	Second row	29 June 1988 (aged 36)	2	(Madagascar) FTFA
