= Senegalese Rugby Federation =

The Senegalese Rugby Federation (French: Fédération Sénégalaise de Rugby) is the governing body for rugby union in Senegal. It is a member of the Confederation of African Rugby (CAR) and a member of the International Rugby Board.
