= Uganda women's national rugby union team =

Uganda
- Nickname: The Lady Cranes
- Union: Uganda Rugby Union
First colours

World Rugby ranking
- Current: 31 (as of 23 March 2026)
- Highest: 29 (1 December 2025)
- Lowest: 44 (2024)

First international
- Rwanda 0–92 Uganda (Amahoro Stadium, Kigali; 26 February 2005)

Biggest win
- Rwanda 0–92 Uganda (Amahoro Stadium, Kigali; 26 February 2005)

Biggest defeat
- Kenya 87–3 Uganda (Jomo Kenyatta Stadium, Kisumu; 11 November 2023)

The Uganda women's national rugby union team, known as the Lady Rugby Cranes, are a national sporting side of Uganda that represents them at rugby union. The side played their first test against Rwanda in 2005.

== History ==
Uganda played their first international test on 26 February 2005 against Rwanda in Kigali. They trounced the hosts 92–0 in their biggest win. The two sides met again in Kampala ten days later where hosts, Uganda, trounced Rwanda a second time 81–0.

Uganda and Kenya have competed for the Elgon Cup since they first clashed in 2006. In 2016, Uganda were ranked 39th in World Rugby's ranking.

They lost a two-test series to Tunisia at the El Menzah Stadium in Tunis in November 2023.

Uganda secured promotion to the 2025 Rugby Africa Women's Cup after defeating Zimbabwe in the final match of the Division 1 tournament.

== Results summary ==
(Full internationals only, updated to 19 April 2025)

Uganda Internationals From 2005
Opponent	First Match	Played	Won	Drawn	Lost	For	Against	Win %
Ivory Coast	2025	1	1	0	0	52	0	100%
Kenya	2006	25	8	2	15	253	493	32.00%
Madagascar	2019	1	0	1	0	15	15	0.00%
Rwanda	2005	2	2	0	0	173	0	100.00%
South Africa	2013	2	0	0	2	10	152	0.00%
Tunisia	2023	3	1	0	2	57	89	33.33%
Zambia	2022	1	1	0	0	36	17	100.00%
Zimbabwe	2021	3	3	0	0	138	10	100.00%
Summary	2005	38	16	3	19	734	776	42.10%
