= San-Pédro, Ivory Coast =

San-Pédro
- City, sub-prefecture, and commune
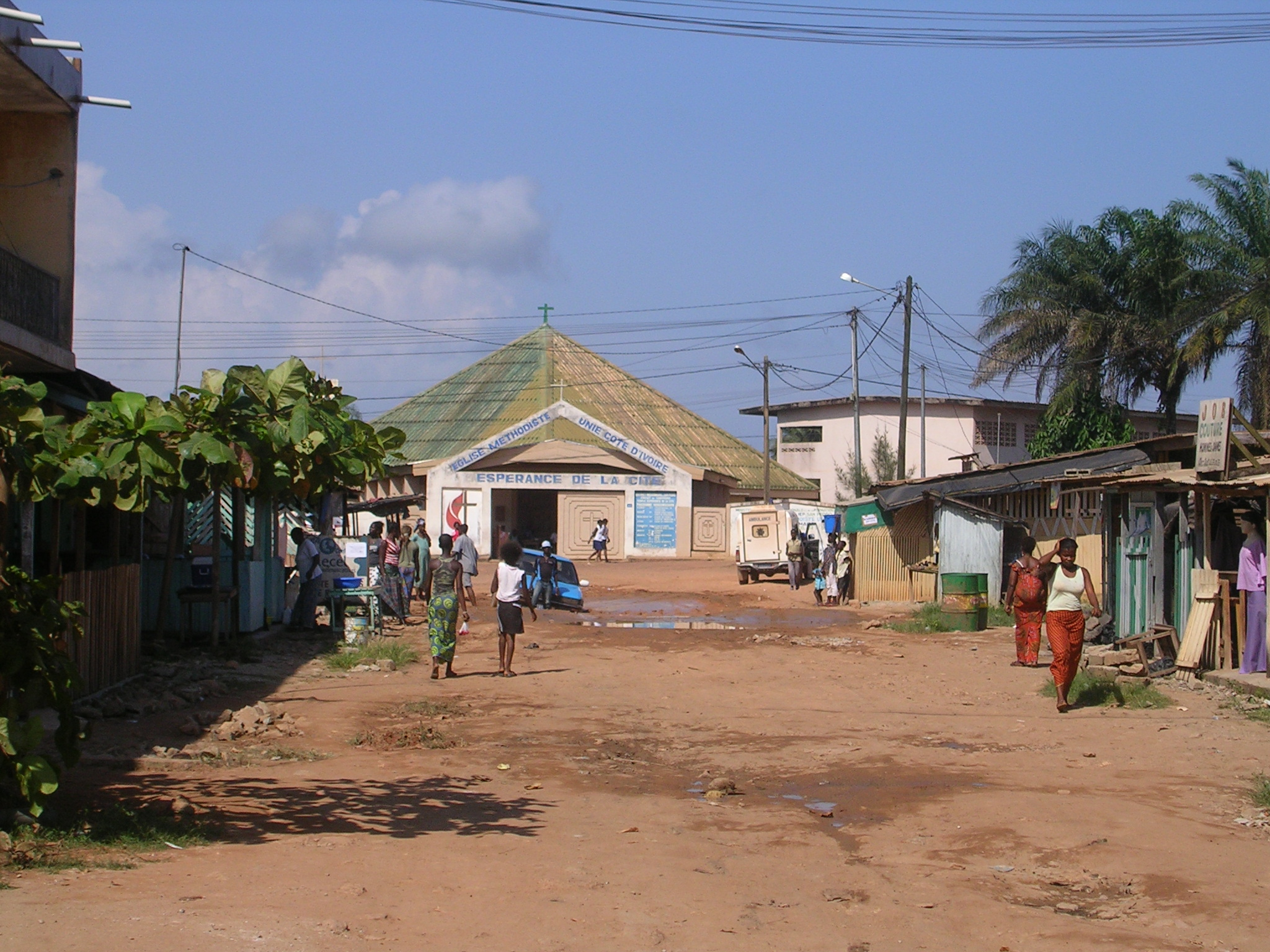
- View to a methodist church in San-Pédro

- Location within Ivory Coast San-Pédro (Africa)
- Coordinates: 4°45′N 6°38′W
- Ivory Coast: Ivory Coast
- District: Bas-Sassandra
- Region: San-Pédro
- Department: San-Pédro

Area
  - Total: 887 km^{2} (342 sq mi)
- Elevation: 1 m (3.3 ft)

Population (2021 census)
  - Total: 390,654
  - Density: 440/km^{2} (1,140/sq mi)
  - City: 164,944
- (2014 census)

San-Pédro is a city in southwestern Ivory Coast. It is the nation's second largest port and the seat of Bas-Sassandra District and San-Pédro Region. It is also a commune and the seat of and a sub-prefecture of San-Pédro Department. In the 2014 census, the city had a population of 164,944, making it the sixth-largest city in the country. The city is served by San Pédro Airport.

Northwest of the city lies the Taï National Park, known as one of the last sanctuaries of the pygmy hippopotamus, which is listed on the UNESCO's World Heritage List.

== Economy ==
San-Pédro is the second economic hub of Côte d'Ivoire after Abidjan, ahead of Bouaké due to its port, as well as the presence of many factories mainly operating in the cocoa industry, flour milling, cement, and the timber sector. Largely developed from the 1960s, fishing is an important industry, while the town is known for its nightlife and its beaches.

== Demographics ==
In 2014, the population of the sub-prefecture of San-Pédro was 261,616.

== Transport ==
A railway is proposed from San-Pédro to iron ore deposits around Mount Nimba. There would be no immediate connection with the existing metre gauge national railway at Abidjan.

Port Autonome de San Pedro is a maritime port that serves the city.

== Education ==
École française de San Pédro is located in San-Pédro.

== Sports ==
Stade Municipal (San-Pédro) is home to Séwé FC and FC San Pédro

== Notable people ==
- Jean-Philippe Gbamin (born 25 September 1995), is an Ivorian footballer

== Villages ==
The twenty eight villages of the sub-prefecture of San-Pédro and their population in 2014 are:

1. Baba (8,336)
2. Digboué (138)
3. Dimoulé (1,068)
4. Djiro-Gnépahio/Campement Bernard (3,563)
5. Grand-Gabo (116)
6. Kablaké 1 (471)
7. Kablaké 2 (468)
8. Klou (220)
9. Petit-Gabo (240)
10. Petit-Pédro (2,711)
11. Pont-Bascule (914)
12. Poro (932)
13. San-Pedro (164,944)
14. Taki (1,502)
15. Digboué-Klou (211)
16. Djahio (1,996)
17. Doulayéko (1,957)
18. Goréké (873)
19. Kounouko (7,885)
20. Kpotè (7,037)
21. Krémoué (1,587)
22. Madié (830)
23. Magné (1,059)
24. Mapri (1,204)
25. Marikro (3,481)
26. Monogaga (511)
27. Moussadougou (16,344)
28. Podio (1,553)
29. Pont-Brimé (3,449)
30. Popoko (2,382)
31. Taboké (2,865)
32. Watté (20,769)

== Sister cities ==
- Kaohsiung, Taiwan (2025)

== Gallery ==
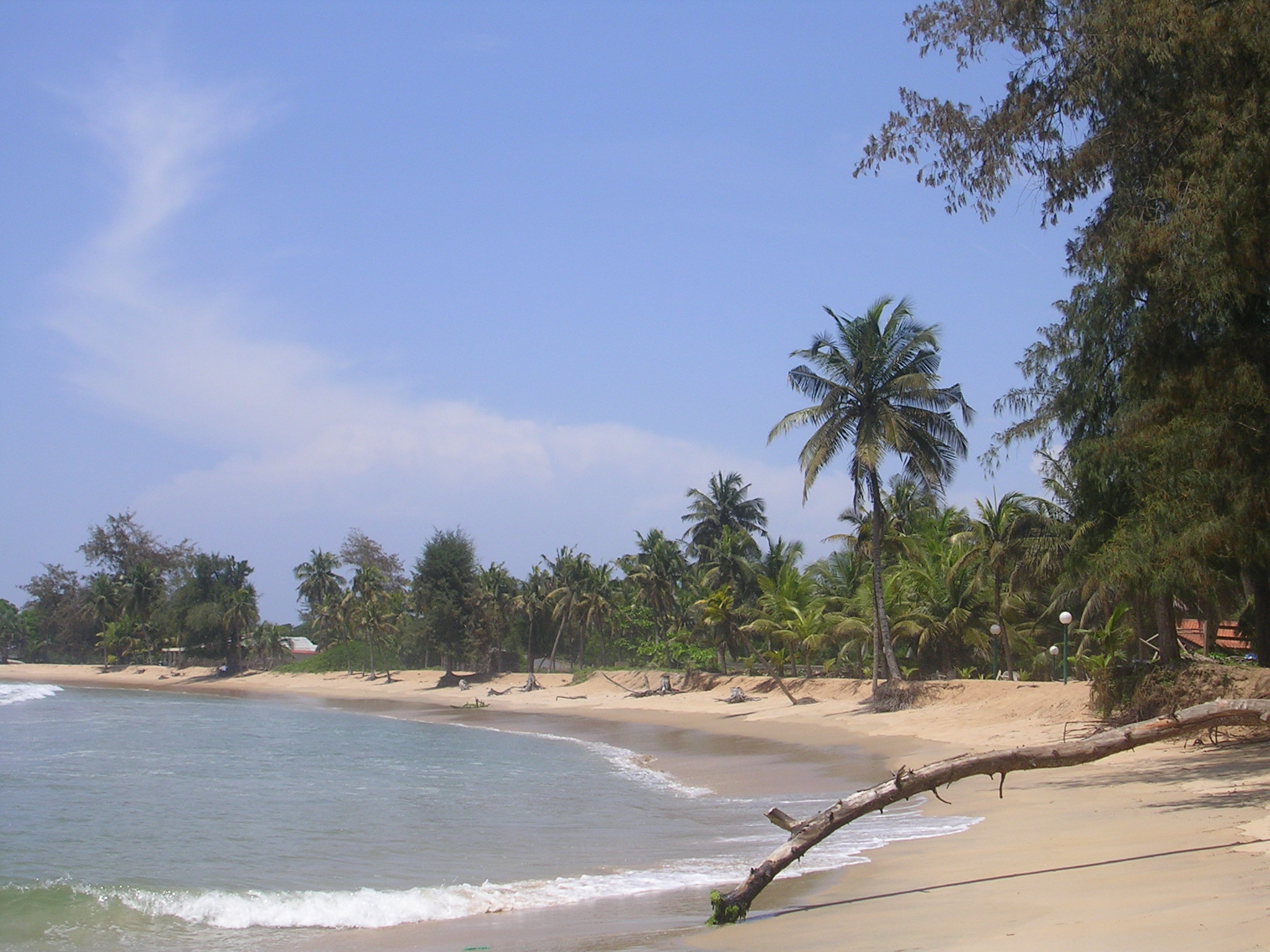

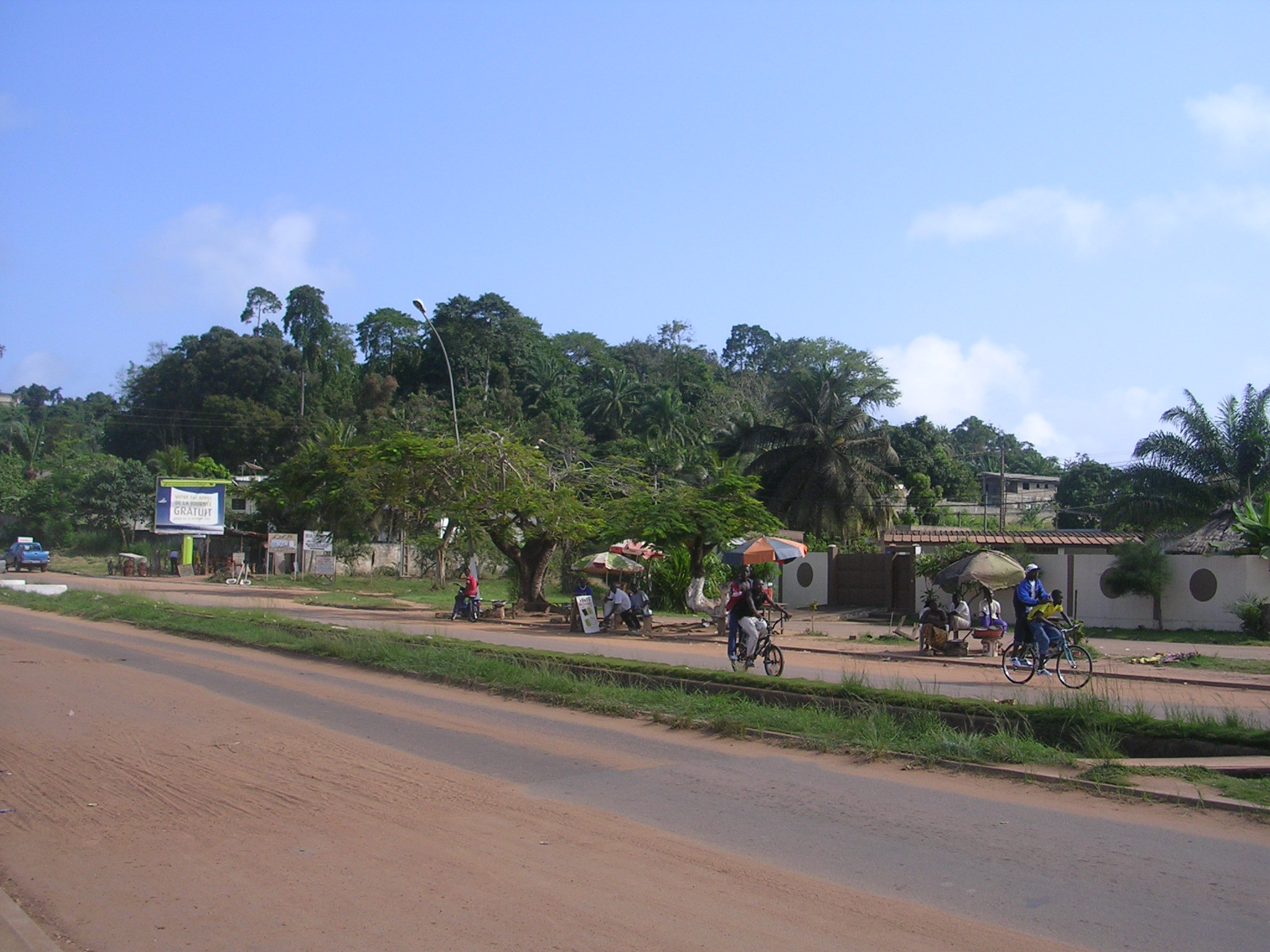

== See also ==
- Cement in Africa
- Railway stations in Ivory Coast
