= Kenya women's national rugby union team =

Kenya
- Nickname: Lionesses
- Union: Kenya Rugby Union
- Head coach: Dennis Mwanja
- Captain: Natasha Emali
First colours

World Rugby ranking
- Current: 20 (as of 22 September 2025)

First international
- Kenya 0–24 Uganda (Nairobi, Kenya; 13 May 2006)

Biggest win
- Kenya 87–3 Uganda (Kisumu, Kenya; 11 November 2023)

Biggest defeat
- South Africa 66–0 Kenya (Stellenbosch, South Africa; 12 August 2021)

World Cup
- Appearances: 0

The Kenya women's national rugby union team, popularly known as Lionesses are the Kenya Women's XVs Rugby Team, managed by Kenya Rugby Union. The Lionesses play in red jerseys with black shorts. The side first played in 2006 on the sixth of September and has represented Kenya in various tournaments ever since. The Lionesses currently rank 23rd in the World Rugby Rankings and second in Africa.

== History ==
Kenya were runners-up at the 2019 Rugby Africa Women's Cup which also doubled as a World Cup qualifying tournament. Despite their loss, the Lionesses still advanced to a cross-regional repechage play-off against Colombia. However, their last chances of qualifying were dashed with a narrow 15–16 loss to Colombia in Nairobi.

== Results summary ==
(Full internationals only, updated to 20 September 2024)

Rugby: Kenya internationals 2006-
Opponent	First game	Played	Won	Drawn	Lost	Percentage
Cameroon	2023	2	2	0	0	100.00%
Colombia	2021	2	1	0	1	50.00%
Kazakhstan	2023	1	0	0	1	0.00%
Madagascar	2019	6	3	0	3	50.00%
South Africa	2019	6	0	0	6	0.00%
Spain	2023	1	0	0	1	0.00%
Uganda	2006	25	15	2	8	60.00%
Zambia	2022	1	1	0	0	100.00%
Summary	2006	44	22	2	20	50.00%

== Players ==
Kenya announced their final squad on 3 October 2023 for the inaugural WXV 3 tournament that will be held in Dubai.
Note: The age and number of caps listed for each player is as of 11 November 2023.

Player	Position	Date of birth (age)	Caps	Club/province
Knight Otwoma	Hooker	{{{age}}}	17	(Kenya) Impala Roans
Staycy Atieno	Hooker	11 November 1994 (aged 29)	14	(Kenya) Mwamba
Naomi Muhanji	Hooker	{{{age}}}	5	
Rose Otieno	Prop	{{{age}}}	13	(Kenya) Northern Suburbs
Evelyn Kalamera	Prop	{{{age}}}	19	(Kenya) Mwamba
Mercy Migongo	Prop	{{{age}}}	9	(Kenya) Impala Roans
Natasha Emali	Prop	{{{age}}}	10	(Kenya) Mwamba
Valentine Otieno	Prop	{{{age}}}	3	(Kenya) Northern Suburbs
Maureen Chebet	Lock	{{{age}}}	3	(Kenya) Mwamba
Faith Livoi	Lock	29 March 2000 (aged 23)	4	(Kenya) Mwamba
Naomi Jelagat	Lock	{{{age}}}	9	(Kenya) Mwamba
Helsa Khisa	Lock	{{{age}}}	6	(Kenya) Impala Roans
Enid Ouma (c)	Flanker	{{{age}}}	12	
Diana Kemunto	Flanker	4 April 1998 (aged 25)	13	(Kenya) Impala Roans
Michelle Akinyi	Flanker	{{{age}}}	16	(Kenya) Impala Roans
Phoebe Akinyi	Number 8	{{{age}}}	8	(Kenya) Northern Suburbs
Judith Okumu	Scrum-half	12 July 1998 (aged 25)	12	(Kenya) Impala Roans
Winnie Owino	Scrum-half	{{{age}}}	11	(Kenya) Impala Roans
Edith Naliaka	Scrum-half	{{{age}}}	3	(Kenya) Mwamba
Ann Goretti	Fly-half	{{{age}}}	14	(Kenya) Impala Roans
Grace Okulu	Fly-half	16 March 1998 (aged 25)	14	(Kenya) Nakuru
Priscah Nyerere	Centre	{{{age}}}	8	(Kenya) Impala Roans
Laureen Akoth	Centre	{{{age}}}	8	(Kenya) Nakuru
Angel Charity Juma	Centre	{{{age}}}	5	(Kenya) Impala Roans
Sharon Auma	Wing	16 February 2001 (aged 22)	3	(Kenya) Impala Roans
Terry Ayesa	Wing	{{{age}}}	9	(Kenya) Mwamba
Lewin Amazimbi	Wing	{{{age}}}	2	(Kenya) Northern Suburbs
Jiveti Daisy Osore	Wing	{{{age}}}		(Kenya) Northern Suburbs
Diana Omosso	Fullback	{{{age}}}	7	(Kenya) Mwamba
Freshia Awino	Fullback	7 March 2000 (aged 23)	3	(Kenya) Nakuru

Women's World Rugby Rankings Top 20 rankings as of 15 September 2025
Rank	Change*	Team	Points
1	Steady	England	97.76
2	Steady	Canada	90.13
3	Steady	New Zealand	88.76
4	Steady	France	86.42
5	Steady	Ireland	78.20
6	Steady	Scotland	77.39
7	Steady	Australia	75.46
8	Steady	United States	72.90
9	Steady	Italy	72.37
10	Steady	South Africa	71.62
11	Steady	Japan	69.72
12	Steady	Wales	66.13
13	Steady	Fiji	63.98
14	Steady	Spain	62.42
15	Steady	Samoa	59.72
16	Steady	Hong Kong	57.56
17	Steady	Netherlands	57.42
18	Steady	Russia	55.10
19	Steady	Kazakhstan	53.88
20	Steady	Kenya	50.68
*Change from the previous week
