= World Rugby Women's World Rankings =

Global sports team ranking list

Women's World Rugby Rankings Top 20 rankings as of 6 April 2026
Rank	Change*	Team	Points
1	Steady	England	98.09
2	Steady	Canada	91.53
3	Steady	New Zealand	89.85
4	Steady	France	83.60
5	Steady	Ireland	78.20
6	Steady	Scotland	77.39
7	Steady	Australia	75.46
8	Steady	United States	72.90
9	Steady	Italy	72.37
10	Steady	South Africa	71.62
11	Steady	Japan	69.72
12	Steady	Wales	66.13
13	Steady	Fiji	63.98
14	Steady	Spain	62.42
15	Steady	Samoa	59.72
16	Steady	Hong Kong	57.56
17	Steady	Netherlands	57.42
18	Steady	Russia	55.10
19	Steady	Kazakhstan	53.88
20	▲1	Germany	51.10
*Change from the previous week

The World Rugby Women's World Rankings is a ranking system for women's national teams in rugby union, managed by World Rugby, the sport's governing body. Led by England as of June 2023, they attempt to compare the strength of internationally active women's national teams at any given time.

As a follow-on to the existing World Rugby Men's World Rankings, the teams of World Rugby's member nations are ranked based on their game results, with the most successful teams being ranked highest. The top step of the women's rankings have been notably less volatile than the equivalent men's rankings, with only two teams, New Zealand and England reaching that mark.

== List of rankings leader ==
Team	Start date	End date	Weeks	Total weeks
New Zealand	8 September 2003	3 December 2012	482	482
England	3 December 2012	11 February 2013	10	10
New Zealand	11 February 2013	19 June 2017	227	709
England	19 June 2017	21 August 2017	9	19
New Zealand	21 August 2017	16 November 2020	221	930
England	16 November 2020	Present (Note: As of 3 September 2026.)	302	321

Summary

Team	Total weeks	Most consecutive weeks
New Zealand	930	482
England	321	302

== See also ==
- World Rugby Men's World Rankings
