= 1999 Women's rugby league trans-Tasman Test series =

The 1999 Women's rugby league trans-Tasman Test series was the third sequence of matches between Australia and New Zealand women's rugby league teams, following an exchange of tours in 1995 and 1997. The 1999 series differed from its predecessors in that two Test matches were played in Australia in September 1999, followed by a Third Test in New Zealand in October 1999. Another difference was that no tour matches were played against club, state or provincial teams.

== Background ==
Coming into the 1999 series, the New Zealand women's national rugby league team had won all seven international matches that they had played. This included two wins on their 1995 tour of Australia, two hosting Australia in 1997, and three hosting Great Britain in 1998.

Australia had a record of one win from seven Test matches. The win came in the First Test of their 1996 hosting of a tour by Great Britain.

The New South Wales Women’s Rugby League, which had 140 registered players, affiliated with the New South Wales Rugby League during 1999. In Queensland, there were five-team women’s rugby competitions in Brisbane-Ipswich, Mackay (established 1998), and Cairns.

== Australia squad ==
National championships were held at West Belconnen League Club grounds on 12 and 13 June 1999. In a change from 1998, Brisbane and Ipswich were combined as Queensland, and Illawarra and Sydney were combined as New South Wales. Western Australia competed for the second time. The ACT team were in their fifth tournament as a representative side (1995-1999), after sending club teams to the first four tournaments (1991-1994). Four matches on Saturday and two on Sunday morning completed a round-robin. On Sunday afternoon, New South Wales beat Queensland in the final, 12-8, with Caryl Jarrett scoring the winning try.

For the first time outside of the national championships, an interstate match between Queensland and New South Wales was held on Sunday, 4 July 1999. Behind 6-16, Queensland scored three tries in the last ten minutes, including one in the last minute, to win, 18-16. Kicking-off at 11:30 am, the match was played at ANZ Stadium (Brisbane) prior to a Round 18 NRL match between the Brisbane Broncos and Balmain Tigers.

On Friday, 20 August 1999, an Australian team played a President’s XIII team. The bulk of the Australian team in this match subsequently played in the trans-Tasman series. From the President’s XIII team, Teresa Anderson, Joanne Robson, and Annie Banks played in the trans-Tasman series. The President’s XIII team included players from Western Australia. The match was played at ANZ Stadium (Brisbane) prior to a Round 25 NRL match between the Brisbane Broncos and Parramatta Eels.

=== Team leadership ===
Tarsha Gale was appointed captain.

The team was coached by Wayne Portlock.

=== Player’s Test record ===
J#	Player	Position(s)	Club	State / Territory	H#	Test Matches
J#	Player	Position(s)	Club	State / Territory	H#	Debut	M	T	G	P
17	Teresa Anderson	Wing	South Brisbane Magpies	Qld	39	1998	2	0	0	0
17	Annie Banks	Wing	—	Qld	54	1999	1	0	0	0
13	Jodie Billing	Lock	South Brisbane Magpies	Qld	29	1997	1	0	0	0
4	Alyssa Campbell	Centre	Parramatta Eels	NSW	2	1995	2	1	0	4
14	Natalie Dwyer	Five-eighth	South Sydney Rabbitohs	NSW	1	1995	2	2	0	8
5	Kylie Egan	Wing	—	NSW	31	1997	1	0	0	0
16	Katrina Fanning	Prop	—	ACT	6	1995	2	0	0	0
7	Tarsha Gale	Halfback	South Sydney Rabbitohs	NSW	7	1995	2	0	0	0
–	Caryl Jarrett	Centre	—	NSW	32	1997	0	0	0	0
10	Kylie Mackay	Prop	South Sydney Rabbitohs	NSW	40	1998	2	0	0	0
8	Debbie Merritt	Prop	—	Qld	22	1996	2	0	0	0
15	Katrina Moss	Hooker	—	NSW	13	1995	1	0	0	0
6	Karyn Murphy	Five-eighth	South Brisbane Magpies	Qld	41	1998	2	1	0	4
11	Tahnee Norris	Second-row	South Sydney Rabbitohs	NSW	42	1998	2	0	0	0
1	Loretta O'Neill	Fullback	South Sydney Rabbitohs	NSW	18	1995	2	0	0	0
15	Nicky Richards	Lock	—	NSW	43	1998	2	0	0	0
16	Joanne Robson	Halfback	—	ACT	47	1999	1	0	0	0
3	Karen Shaw	Centre	South Brisbane Magpies	Qld	33	1997	2	1	4	12
9	Karen Stuart	Hooker	South Brisbane Magpies	Qld	34	1997	1	0	0	0
2	Tracey Thompson	Wing	—	Qld	46	1999	2	0	0	0
12	Veronica White	Second-row	Brothers Ipswich	Qld	19	1995	2	1	0	4

Notes:

- The above table reflects confirmed appearances and points, and is missing details of the First Test.
  - There are two known sources reporting on the First Test. A snippet in The Press mentions New Zealand’s second half try-scorers. The Annual mentions New Zealand’s point-scorers. Neither source lists the teams or the scorers of Australia’s ten points.
  - There are three known sources reporting on the Second Test. A snippet in The Press lists only the New Zealand scorers, as does the Annual. A video of, roughly, the last seven-eighths of the match was posted on YouTube. This match video starts after Australia’s opening try. Australia’s second, third and fourth tries are shown and called.
  - There are three written sources reporting on the Third Test. A snippet in the Sunday Star-Times mentions the score and a send-off. A snippet in The Press also mentions the send-off and lists the scorers for both teams. The Annual lists the 17 players, coaches and scorers for both teams.
- The 1999 Brisbane club competition consisted of five sides: Brighton Roosters, Goodna Eagles, Ipswich Brothers, Norths Brisbane Devils, and South Brisbane Magpies.
- Six members of the South Brisbane Magpies club were selected in the 1999 Queensland team, with five of the six subsequently playing for Australia in this series.

== New Zealand squad ==
The New Zealand squad for the Australian leg was selected following the national provincial championships held at Lincoln University on the last weekend in June, with play beginning on Friday, 25 June 1999. Nine teams competed, with two each from Auckland, Wellington and Canterbury, plus single teams from Hawkes Bay, Nelson-Marlborough, and Otago. Propelled by a hattrick of tries from Trish Hina, Wellington Gold defeated Canterbury Black, 42-6, in the final.

In addition to the squad to play Australia later in 1999, a train-on squad was announced for the world tri-series planned for 2000.

=== Team leadership ===
Nadene Conlon was appointed captain.

The team was coached by Tony Lajpold. The support staff were Gavin Tavendale (Financial Manager), Christine Cooper (Manager), Eileen Rankin (Trainer), Christine Panapa (NZWRLF Chair), and Cherie Steel (NZWRLF Secretary).

=== Player’s Test record ===
J#	Player	Position(s)	Club	Province	H#	Test Matches
J#	Player	Position(s)	Club	Province	H#	Debut	M	T	G	P
1	Zavana Aranga	Fullback	Te Aroha Eels	Wellington	2	1995	3	0	7	14
18	Luisa Avaiki	Prop	Richmond Roses	Auckland	4	1995	2	1	0	4
13	Mary Brennan	Lock	Woolston Rams	Canterbury	41	1999	1	0	0	0
11	Nadene Conlon	Second-row	Point Chevalier Pirates	Auckland	6	1995	2	1	0	4
17	Tasha Davie	Lock, Fullback	—	Auckland	34	1998	3	1	0	4
4	Michelle Driscoll	Centre	Richmond Roses	Auckland	8	1997	2	1	0	4
6	Trish Hina	Five-eighth	Te Aroha Eels	Wellington	25	1997	3	3	0	12
–	Jean Kellet	—	—	Wellington	–	—	0	0	0	0
16	Miriama Niha	Second-row	Kaiapoi Bulldogs	Canterbury	42	1999	1	1	0	4
2	Stacey O'Carroll	Wing	—	Auckland	43	1999	2	1	0	4
15	Antoinette Rowley	Prop	Point Chevalier Pirates	Auckland	44	1999	2	1	0	4
8	Jackie Ryder	Prop	Marist Northern	Wellington	37	1998	2	0	0	0
14	Cynthia Ta'ala	Fullback, Second-row	—	Auckland	45	1999	1	0	0	0
3	Selena Te Amo	Centre	Te Aroha Eels	Wellington	24	1997	2	0	0	0
10	Frances Te Ao	Prop, Second-row	Marist Northern	Wellington	46	1999	3	0	0	0
12	Rachel White	Second-row, Lock	Bay Roskill Vikings	Auckland	20	1995	2	1	0	4
5	Sara White	Wing	Bay Roskill Vikings	Auckland	21	1995	2	0	0	0
16	Germaine Wiki	Second-row	Bay Roskill Vikings	Auckland	40	1998	1	1	0	4
14	Leah Witehira	Halfback	Otahuhu Leopards	Auckland	19	1995	3	1	0	4
9	Tracy Wrigley	Hooker	Marist Northern	Wellington	31	1997	2	0	0	0

Notes:

- The above table reflects confirmed appearances and points, and is partially missing details of the First Test.
  - For the First Test, the snippet in The Press mentions New Zealand’s second half try-scorers as, "halfback Leah Witehira and replacement Tasha Davie". The Annual mentions the scorers of New Zealand’s four tries (Trish Nina 2, Leah Witehira, Tasha Davie) and two goals (Zavana Aranga 2). Five players of a probable 17 New Zealanders are confirmed as playing in this First Test.
  - For the Second Test, the snippet in The Press attributes New Zealand's 20 points to five tries, to Nadene Conlon, Zavana Aranga, Rachel White, Leah Witehira, and Michelle Driscoll. The Annual lists four tries (to Nadene Conlon, Zavana Aranga, Rachel White, and Leah Witehira) and two goals (to Zavana Aranga). The match video on YouTube misses the first eighth of play but New Zealand's four tries are shown and called by the commentators to Nadene Conlon, Rachel White, Miriama Niha, and Michelle Driscoll. The goals are attributed by the commnentators to Zavana Aranga. The above table reflects the video.
  - For the Third Test, a snippet in the Sunday Star-Times mentions the score and the send-off of skipper Nadene Conlon. The snippet in The Press also mentions the send-off and lists the scorers for both teams. The Annual lists the 17 players, coaches and scorers for both teams. The Annual lists the same scorers as the snippet in The Press, but in a different order for both teams.
- A team photo of the 19 players and six staff members who travelled to Australia was included in the New Zealand Rugby League Annual 1999. A copy of the team photo is included with the profile of Mary Brennan on the Canterbury Rugby League website. The caption to the photo incorrectly lists Eileen Rankin as Irene Rankin.
- The team for Australia included 42-year-old Mary Brennan, who alongside her daughter Mereana had played for Canterbury against the touring Great Britain side in 1998.
- Selena Te Amo (née Edmonds) had married between the 1998 and 1999 Test Matches.
- Germaine Wiki, who had not travelled to Australia, was brought into the seventeen for the Third Test. Germaine is the sister of Ruben Wiki (55 matches for New Zealand Kiwis, 311 top-tier club matches, 1993 to 2008) and aunt to Ruben’s daughter, Mackenzie Wiki (Cook Islands 2022, New Zealand 2024, and NRLW club Canberra Raiders, 2023 debut).
- Five members of the squad played in Wellington women’s rugby league Grand Final, A sixth player, Tracey Wrigley, missed the match as on the same day she was playing for Wellington rugby union team.

== Results ==
First Test

Thursday, 23 September 1999
5:30 PM

Australia	10 — 20	New Zealand
Tries: 2 Goals: 1	1st: 6–10; 2nd: 4–10	Tries: 4 Trish Hina 2 Leah Witehira; Tasha Davie; Goals: 2 Zavana Aranga 2

Leichhardt Oval, Sydney

Second Test

Monday, 27 September 1999
7:30 PM

Australia	22 — 20	New Zealand
Tries: 4; 1st try-scorer unknown Karyn Murphy; Veronica White; Natalie Dwyer; Goals: 3 Karen Shaw 3/3; Loretta O’Neill 0/1	1st: 10–6; 2nd: 12–14	Tries: 4 Nadene Conlon; Rachel White; Miriama Niha; Michelle Driscoll; Goals: 2 Zavana Aranga 2/4

Penrith Stadium, Sydney
Video Replay

Third Test

Friday, 29 October 1999
5:40 PM

New Zealand	26 — 14	Australia
Tries: 5 Stacey O'Carroll; Trish Hina; Antoinette Rowley; Luisa Avaiki; Germaine Wiki; Goals: 3 Zavana Aranga 3	1st: 14–8; 2nd: 12–6	Tries: 3 Karen Shaw; Alyssa Campbell; Natalie Dwyer; Goals: 1 Karen Shaw

Ericsson Stadium, Auckland
Referee: Arthur Clark (New Zealand)
