= 1997 Australia women's rugby league tour of New Zealand =

- Coach(es): John Taylor
- Tour captain(s): Tarsha Gale
- Top try scorer(s): Loretta O'Neill 6+
- Top test point scorer(s): Trish Hina 20
- Top test try scorer(s): Trish Hina 5
Summary
P	W	D	L
Total
4	2	0	2
Test match
2	0	0	2
Opponent
P	W	D	L
New Zealand
2	0	0	2

The Australia women's rugby league tour of New Zealand was the first formal tour by the women's national team. It was also the first visit of a national women's rugby league team to New Zealand. Two of the four matches were full internationals. These were the sixth and seventh international matches played in women's rugby league.

== Background ==
The New Zealand women's national rugby league team had toured Australia in 1995, winning all seven matches including the two internationals.

The Great Britain women's national rugby league team had toured Australia in 1996, winning the three Test series, two matches to one, and four other tour matches.

Whilst this was the first formal tour by the Australia women's national rugby league team, it was the second by a women's rugby league team from Australia. A combined Australian Capital Territory women's team had toured the North Island of New Zealand in April 1992 playing four matches against club teams. Two club teams from Australia travelled to Suva, Fiji in early October 1993, playing a match against each other, before selecting a combined side and playing as an Australian team against a team of Fijian women.

The New Zealand Women's Rugby League Federation staged the matches without any financial support from the New Zealand Rugby League. The NZWRLF had not (yet) affiliated with the NZRL.

The visitors travelled under the auspices of the Australian Women's Rugby League and were obliged to make a significant contribution to the financial cost of their trip.

== Australia squad ==
National Championships were held at Redfern Oval on the long weekend in June. Representative teams from Brisbane, Canberra, Illawarra, NSW Country and Sydney competed.

A squad of twenty-six players was announced on 21 August 1997.

The Illawarra Mercury reported that players selected in the team were obliged to provide $3,000 towards the costs of the tour, with one selected player dropping out for financial reasons. The Dominion reported that a total of $45,000 was raised.

=== Team leadership ===
Tarsha Gale was appointed captain, with Karen Shaw as vice-captain.

The team was coached by John Taylor.

Julie McGuffie, who had captained Australia in the previous year's matches against Great Britain, was unavailable due to injury.

=== Player's Test record ===
J#	Player	Position(s)	Club	State / Territory	H#	Test Matches
J#	Player	Position(s)	Club	State / Territory	H#	Debut	M	T	G	P
1	Loretta O'Neill	Fullback	South Sydney Rabbitohs	NSW	18	1995	2	2	0	8
2	Allison Smith	Wing	Queanbeyan Braves	ACT	27	1996	2	0	1	2
3	Karen Shaw	Centre	—	—	33	1997	2	0	4	8
4	Kylie Egan	Centre	—	—	31	1997	2	1	0	4
5	Caryl Jarrett	Wing	—	NSW	32	1997	2	1	0	4
6	Natalie Dwyer	Five-eighth	South Sydney Rabbitohs	NSW	1	1995	2	0	0	0
7	Tarsha Gale	Halfback	South Sydney Rabbitohs	NSW	7	1995	2	0	0	0
8	Mandy Ingersoll	Prop	South Sydney Rabbitohs	NSW	8	1995	2	0	0	0
9	Rebecca Wisener	Hooker	Woden-Weston Rams	ACT	17	1995	2	1	0	4
10	Katrina Fanning	Prop	Sails Pirates	ACT	6	1995	2	0	0	0
11	Linda Pearson	Second-row	—	NSW	37	1997	2	0	0	0
12	Jodie Billing	Second-row	—	—	29	1997	2	1	0	4
13	Jackie Raisin	Lock	—	—	26	1996	2	1	0	4
14	Katrina Moss	Hooker	South Sydney Rabbitohs	NSW	13	1995	2	1	0	4
15	Karen Stuart	Hooker	—	—	34	1997	2	0	0	0
16	Sharon Patterson	—	Woden-Weston Rams	ACT	24	1996	2	0	0	0
17	Karen Brown	—	Tuggeranong Castaways	ACT	30	1997	0	0	0	0
18	Steph Payne	—	Queanbeyan Braves	ACT	25	1996	0	0	0	0
19	Kellie Chessor	Second-row	South Sydney Rabbitohs	NSW	3	1995	0	0	0	0
20	Christina Moss	—	South Sydney Rabbitohs	NSW	36	1997	0	0	0	0
21	Selena Malone	—	—	—	–	—	0	0	0	0
22	Debbie Merritt	Prop	—	—	22	1996	0	0	0	0
23	Kiri Olsen	—	South Sydney Rabbitohs	NSW	–	—	0	0	0	0
24	Samantha Ramsamy	Centre, Wing	—	—	60	2001	0	0	0	0
25	Kelly Rhodes	—	—	—	38	1997	0	0	0	0
26	Veronica White	Second-row	South Sydney Rabbitohs	NSW	19	1995	0	0	0	0

Notes:

- The Autex New Zealand Rugby League Annual 1997 lists the squads just once, rather than separately for the two Test Matches, which were played four days apart, on September 20 and 24, 1997. The above table displays two matches for the 17 Australians listed on an assumption that the Annual infers that all 17 played both games. It is not, however, explicitly stated.
- A preview of the First Test in The Evening Post listed 26 players, including the 17 listed in the Annual.
- A preview of the First Test in The Dominion listed 18 Australian players, with Steph Payne the player from this list not in the 17 listed in the Annual.
- A player's 1997 club is displayed in the above table, where known.
- Six members of the squad had represented the ACT at the National Championships in early June.
- Nine members of the squad of 26 had played for South Sydney Rabbitohs during the 1997 Sydney Women's Rugby League season, in which the team won a second-successive premiership.
- A brief report on the first tour match published in the Illawarra Mercury listed only the Australians with multiple tries: Loretta O'Neill 4, Karen Shaw 2, Kylie Egan 2, Caryl Jarrett 2, and Sharon Patterson 2.
- A brief report on the second tour match published in The Evening Post remarked that Allison Smith had scored 22 points.

== New Zealand squad ==
The New Zealand team was selected at the conclusion of a national provincial tournament held on the weekend of 13 and 14 September 2017. One of two Wellington teams, Wellington Gold had a narrow win over one of two Auckland teams, Auckland Blue, in the final. A squad of 17 players was selected, with five players from Wellington and twelve from Auckland.

=== Team leadership ===
Zavana Aranga was appointed captain, with Nadene Conlon as vice-captain.

The team was coached by Janie Thompson (Auckland). The support staff were manager Diane Pakai and trainer Eileen Rankin.

=== Player's tour record ===
J#	Player	Position(s)	Club	State / Territory	H#	Test Matches
J#	Player	Position(s)	Club	State / Territory	H#	Debut	M	T	G	P
1	Zavana Aranga	Fullback	Te Aroha Eels	Wellington	2	1995	2	0	7	14
2	Selena Edmonds	Wing	Te Aroha Eels	Wellington	24	1997	2	1	0	4
3	Mere Miki	Centre	Richmond Roses	Auckland	28	1997	2	2	0	8
4	Mate Lefale	Centre	Bay Roskill Vikings	Auckland	27	1997	2	1	0	4
5	Lemelle Lauaki	Wing	Mount Albert Lions	Auckland	26	1997	2	2	0	8
6	Trish Hina	Five-eighth	Te Aroha Eels	Wellington	25	1997	2	5	0	20
7	Priscilla Moke	Halfback	Glenora Bears	Auckland	30	1997	2	0	0	0
8	Nicole Presland	Prop	Bay Roskill Vikings	Auckland	14	1995	2	0	0	0
9	Tracy Wrigley	Hooker	Richmond Roses	Auckland	31	1997	2	0	0	0
10	Luisa Avaiki	Prop	Richmond Roses	Auckland	4	1995	2	1	0	4
11	Nadene Conlon	Second-row	Mount Albert Lions	Auckland	6	1995	2	0	0	0
12	Christine Moir	Second-row	Glenora Bears	Auckland	29	1997	2	0	0	0
13	Rachel White	Lock	Bay Roskill Vikings	Auckland	20	1995	2	0	0	0
14	Kaylene Ihaia	Halfback	Miramar	Wellington	11	1995	2	0	0	0
15	Megan Tahapeehi	Prop	Te Aroha Eels	Wellington	17	1997	2	0	0	0
16	Michelle Driscoll	Centre	Richmond Roses	Auckland	8	1997	2	2	0	8
17	Lynley Tierney	Lock	Mount Wellington Warriors	Auckland	18	1995	2	1	0	4

Notes:

- The Autex New Zealand Rugby League Annual 1997 lists the squads just once, rather than separately for the two Test Matches. The above table displays two matches for the 17 New Zealanders listed on an assumption that the Annual infers that all 17 played both games. It is not, however, explicitly stated.
- A preview of the First Test in The Evening Post listed only the same 17 players listed in the Annual, grouped by their provincial team.
- A preview of the First Test in The Dominion listed 17 players, but in contrast to the listing in the Annual had Michelle Driscoll at centre, Megan Tahapeehi at prop, and Mate Lefale and Nicole Presland on the interchange bench.
- The Annual identified that eight of the players came from two clubs, Richmond Roses and Te Aroha Eels.
- Roll of Honour / Heritage Numbers (H#) were ascribed to all 1995 tourists. This included Michelle Driscoll and Megan Tahapeehi who played in tour games in 1995 but did not make their Test Match debut until this series.
- Megan Tahapeehi is the sister of Quentin Pongia (35 matches for the New Zealand Kiwis, 167 top-tier club matches, 1993 to 2004).

== Results ==
Sunday, 14 September 1997

Gisborne-East Coast Wahine Toa	0 — 74	Australia
		Tries: 16; Loretta O'Neill 4 Kylie Egan 2 Sharon Patterson 2 Caryl Jarrett 2 Karen Shaw 2; 4 tries not listed Goals: 5

Gisborne

Wednesday, 17 September 1997

Hawke's Bay	0 — 54	Australia
		Allison Smith 22 points

Hastings

First Test

Saturday, 20 September 1997
2:30 PM

New Zealand	34 — 26	Australia
Tries: 7 Trish Hina 2 Michelle Driscoll 2 Selena Edmonds; Mere Miki; Lemelle Lauaki; Goals: 3 Zavana Aranga 3	1st: 14–14; 2nd: 20–12	Tries: 5 Loretta O'Neill 2 Jackie Raisin; Rebecca Wisener; Kylie Egan; Goals: 3 Karen Shaw 2 Allison Smith

Petone Recreation Ground, Lower Hutt, Wellington

Second Test

Wednesday, 24 September 1997
8:00 PM

New Zealand	40 — 16	Australia
Tries: 8 Trish Hina 3 Lynley Tierney; Lemelle Lauaki; Mere Miki; Luisa Avaiki; Mate Lefale; Goals: 4 Zavana Aranga 4	1st: 14–10; 2nd: 26–4	Tries: 3 Jodie Billing; Caryl Jarrett; Katrina Moss; Goals: 2 Karen Shaw 2

Carlaw Park, Auckland
