= 1998 Great Britain women's rugby league tour of New Zealand =

- Coach(es): Jackie Sheldon
- Tour captain(s): Lisa McIntosh
- Top test point scorer(s): Joanne Hewson (1t) & Brenda Dobek (2g) 4
- Top test try scorer(s): Joanne Hewson 1
Summary
P	W	D	L
Total
6	3	0	3
Test match
3	0	0	3
Opponent
P	W	D	L
New Zealand
3	0	0	3

Tour chronology
- Previous tour: 1996
- Next tour: 2002

The Great Britain Women's Rugby League tour of New Zealand in 1998 was the first such visit by a female British or English Rugby League team, and their second tour after a 1996 visit to Australia. Six matches were played during the three-week tour, including three Test Matches. For the host nation, New Zealand, this tour followed on from a visit by the Australian women's rugby league team during the previous year, 1997.

Great Britain won the three tour matches but lost each of the three Test Matches by large margins, registering a single try and two goals in the series.

== Team Leadership ==
The team was coached by Jackie Sheldon. Roland Davis was tour manager and Lisa McCandless was team manager. The team was captained by Lisa McIntosh with vice-captain Liz Kitchen. Paula Clark served as the team's physiotherapist.

== Squad ==
A photo of the 1998 touring team is included with the Gilmour interview on the Women in Rugby League website.
Point scorers are known for five of the six matches, excluding the first tour match against New Zealand Māori. Joanne Hewson scored a try against Auckland, and another try in the 1st Test. Joanna Will scored two tries in the match against Canterbury.
The Jumper Number column shows the order players were listed in the team named for the 2nd Test, which appeared in a preview article in the Christchurch newspaper, The Press.

Jumper Number	Player	Position	Club
	Jill Adams	Stand-off	Redhill
2	Jane Banks	Wing	Wigan
17	Heather Biggs		Rochdale
5	Teresa Bruce	Wing	Wakefield
	Julie Burrows	Prop	Wakefield
	Karen Burrows		Redhill
6	Brenda Dobek	Stand-off	Wakefield
11	Lucy Ferguson	Second-row	Wakefield
4	Natalie Gilmour	Centre	Wakefield
7	Mandy Green	Halfback, Hooker	Dudley Hill
	Sue Hayward		Wakefield
1	Joanne Hewson	Fullback, Wing	Barrow
	Michelle Janczuk		Dudley Hill
	Sharron Johnson		Wigan
3	Allison Kitchin	Centre	Barrow
15	Liz Kitchin	interchange	Barrow
9	Michelle Land	Hooker	Wakefield
13	Lisa McIntosh	Lock	Dudley Hill
8	Sally Milburn	Prop	Barrow
16	Chantelle Patrick	Wing	Dudley Hill
	Tracy Pincher		Redhill
14	Kirsty Robinson	Centre	Wakefield
12	Rebecca Stevens	Second-row	Sheffield
	Vicky Studd		Dudley Hill
	Joanna Will	Fullback	Wakefield
10	Sam Wood	Prop	Wakefield

== Results ==
Sunday, August 16

New Zealand Māori	4–32	Great Britain
	Result

Waitakere Stadium, Auckland
Referee: John McEwan

Wednesday, August 19

Auckland	18–20	Great Britain
Tries: 3 Stacey O'Carroll; Ana Rewha; Marianne Hemara; Goals: 3 Angela Searancke 3	HT 10-8; Report	Tries: 4 Teressa Bruce; Vicky Studd; Joanne Hewson; Brenda Dobek; Goals: 2 Brenda Dobek 2

Carlaw Park, Auckland
Referee: Arthur Clarke

A 'spectacular' try to Brenda Dobek in the closing minutes won the match for Great Britain, against an Auckland side that were missing their national team representatives.

=== 1st Test ===
Sunday, August 23

New Zealand	28–6	Great Britain
Tries: 5 Trish Hina 2 Leah Witehira; Germaine Wiki; Sara White; Goals: 4 Zavana Aranga 4	HT 18-6; Report	Tries: 1 Joanne Hewson; Goals: 1 Brenda Dobek

Puketawhero Park, Rotorua
Referee: Derek Horne

Playing a more physical game, to dominate possession and territory, New Zealand scored three converted tries in the first 30 minutes. A slick switch pass by Debbie Chase sent Trish Hina in for the opener. Leah Witehira found a gap for the second and Germaine Wiki broke through tackles for the third try.

Just as the game was looking to break wide open for New Zealand, Great Britain wing Joanne "Flo-Jo" Hewson showed why she is rated the most dangerous Lioness attacker as she danced around her marker and left the cover defence in her wake.

— New Zealand Press Association, The Press, Christchurch (24 August 1998)

Both teams displayed improved defence in the second half, with Great Britain 'tackling ferociously' on their own line. Capitalising on sustain pressure, Trish Hina scored her second try after 15 minutes. In an 80-metre run, winger Sara White fended off two defenders and outsprinted others for an 80th minute try.

Wednesday, August 26
7.30pm

Canterbury	0–20	Great Britain
Tries: nil Goals: nil	HT 0-16; Report	Tries: 4 Joanna Will 2 Kirsty Robinson; Jill Adams; Goals: 2 Karen Burrows 2

Rugby League Park, Christchurch
Referee: Kevin Kirner
Player of the Match: Joanna Will (GB), Mary Brennan (Cant)

The Canterbury team included a mother & daughter pairing, second rower Mary Brennan, aged 41, and centre Mereana Brennan, aged 17. Other players to feature for Canterbury included loose forward Vicki Blair, Kylie O'Loughlin, Melany Taniora-Green and Vicki Logopati. They were coached Jack Tauwhare.

=== 2nd Test ===
Saturday, August 29
2.30pm

New Zealand	44–0	Great Britain
Tries: 8 Leah Witehira 2 Trish Hina 2 Rachel White; Germaine Wiki; Nadene Conlon; Tasha Davie; Goals: 6 Zavana Aranga 6	HT 14-0; Report	Tries: nil Goals: nil

Rugby League Park, Christchurch
Referee: Gary Baxter

The Kiwi Ferns encountered strong opposition for 30 minutes on Saturday. Their sole try had come from scrum-half Leah Witehira robbing a rival of the ball in a one-on-one tackle and scampering 25m to score, while only desperate cover defence had prevented Britain scoring on both wings.

— John Coffey, The Press, Christchurch (31 August 1998)

Leah Witehira collected her own grubber kick to score the second try, then gave the last pass to Trish Hina for the third and final first half try. The Kiwi Ferns added five tries in the second half.

=== 3rd Test ===
Friday, September 4
7:30pm

New Zealand	38–2	Great Britain
Tries: 7 Zavana Aranga 2 Sara White 2 Leah Witehira; Audrey Thompson; Michelle Driscoll; Goals: 5 Zavana Aranga 5	HT 30-0; Reports	Tries: nil Goals: 1 Brenda Dobek

Carlaw Park, Auckland
Referee: Julia Lee
Player of the Match:
Player of the Series: Luisa Avaiki

New Zealand dominated the first half, obtaining a 30 to nil lead at the break.

I'm more than happy with the way the ladies have applied what they've learnt over the last two and a half weeks. They played very good football on Friday and put the Poms under a lot of pressure in the first half.

— Tony Lajpold (Coach), The Press, Christchurch (7 September 1998)

== New Zealand Team ==
The New Zealand Rugby League Annual '98 included a three-page report, including four photos. The report lists 17 players in the New Zealand team. It is not clear whether each of the 17 played in all three Test Matches. The 17 listed do match the teams named in preview articles for the series and 2nd Test.

Jumper Number	Heritage Number	Player	Position	Club	Region	Debut	Tries	Goals	Points
1	2	Zavana Aranga	Fullback	Te Aroha	Wellington	1995	2	15	38
2	20	Sara White	Wing	Bay Roskill	Auckland	1995	3	0	12
3	25	Trish Hina	Centre	Te Aroha	Wellington	1997	4	0	16
4	8	Michelle Driscoll	Centre	Richmond	Auckland	1995	1	0	4
5	35	Somma Te Kahu	Wing	Papanui	Centerbury	1998	0	0	0
6	33	Debbie Chase	Five-eighth	Woolston	Centerbury	1998	0	0	0
7	23	Leah Witehira	Halfback	Otahuhu	Auckland	1995	4	0	16
8	4	Luisa Avaiki	Prop	Richmond	Auckland	1995	0	0	0
9	36	Alarna Nicholas	Hooker	Woolston	Centerbury	1998	0	0	0
10	32	Rachel Bean	Prop	Glenora	Auckland	1998	0	0	0
11	40	Germaine Wiki	Second-row	Bay Roskill	Auckland	1998	2	0	8
12	6	Nadene Conlon	Second-row	Marist	Auckland	1995	1	0	4
13	21	Rachel White	Lock	Bay Roskill	Auckland	1995	1	0	4
14	39	Audrey Thompson	interchange	Glenora	Auckland	1998	1	0	4
15	37	Jackie Ryder	interchange	Miramar	Wellington	1998	0	0	0
16	38	Serena Setu	interchange	Papanui	Centerbury	1998	0	0	0
17	34	Tasha Davie	interchange	Northcote	Auckland	1998	1	0	4

== Sources ==
A physical copy of the New Zealand Rugby League Annual '98 is available at the National Library of New Zealand. British and New Zealand Newspapers available via eResources such as ProQuest and Newsbank.

== See also ==
- Women's rugby league
- Australia women's national rugby league team
- Great Britain women's national rugby league team
- England women's national rugby league team
