= IRL Hall of Legends =

Hall of fame for international rugby league

The IRL Hall of Legends is the hall of fame for international rugby league, created in 2026 by the International Rugby League to recognise those who have made a major impact on the sport's international game. On 15 April 2026, the IRL announced its creation, with the first 42 members inducted during the 2026 Rugby League World Cup.

The initial inductions were split into pre-1954 men, post-1954 men, and women. 1954 was chosen as the cut-off due to the creation of the Rugby League World Cup in that year. The next induction will be during the 2030 Rugby League World Cup, which will also include wheelchair rugby league players. Jason Taumalolo is the only inductee still playing, recognised for his decision to play for Tonga over New Zealand in 2017 which permanently changed the international landscape.

Australia has the most inductees, with 21 representatives having played for the Kangaroos or Jillaroos.

== Criteria ==
To be considered for induction, a player must have:

- Made a significant contribution to international rugby league, and/or
- Be a member of their nation's Hall of Fame or equivalent recognition, and/or
- Been awarded an IRL Golden Cap (50 Tests), and/or
- Won the IRL Golden Boot/RLIF International Player of the Year Award

== Inductees ==
=== Pre-1954 men ===
Inducted	Player	Nation	Years	Caps
2026	Clive Churchill	Australia	1948–1957	37
2026	Dally Messenger	Australia; New Zealand	1907–1910	12
2026	Puig Aubert	France	1947–1956	46
2026	Jim Sullivan	Wales; Great Britain; Other Nationalities	1924–1933	60
2026	Harold Wagstaff	England; Great Britain	1911–1921	21
2026	Dave Brown	Australia	1933–1936	9
2026	Gus Risman	Wales; Great Britain	1932–1946	36
2026	Frank Burge	Australia	1914–1922	13
2026	Billy Batten	England; Great Britain	1907–1921	25
2026	Jean Galia	France	1934–1936	4

=== Post-1954 men ===
Inducted	Player	Nation	Years	Caps
2026	Darren Lockyer	Australia	1997–2011	63
2026	John Raper	Australia	1959–1968	40
2026	Wally Lewis	Australia	1981–1991	34
2026	Reg Gasnier	Australia	1959–1968	39
2026	Mal Meninga	Australia	1982–1994	46
2026	Cameron Smith	Australia	2006–2017	56
2026	Arthur Beetson	Australia	1966–1977	29
2026	Graeme Langlands	Australia	1963–1975	45
2026	Sir Billy Boston	Great Britain; Other Nationalities	1954–1963	34
2026	Bob Fulton	Australia	1968–1978	37
2026	Andrew Johns	Australia	1995–2006	26
2026	Ellery Hanley	England; Great Britain	1984–1993	38
2026	Mark Graham	New Zealand	1977–1988	29
2026	Johnathan Thurston	Australia	2006–2017	38
2026	Ron Coote	Australia	1967–1975	24
2026	Ruben Wiki	New Zealand	1994–2006	55
2026	Stacey Jones	New Zealand	1995–2006	46
2026	Brad Fittler	Australia	1991–2001	40
2026	Alex Murphy	England; Great Britain	1958–1971	29
2026	Malcolm Reilly	England; Great Britain	1970–1977	12
2026	Roger Millward	England; Great Britain	1966–1978	47
2026	Neil Fox	England; Great Britain	1959–1969	30
2026	Petero Civoniceva	Australia; Fiji	2001–2014	51
2026	Mick Sullivan	England; Great Britain	1954–1963	51
2026	Billy Slater	Australia	2008–2017	30
2026	Jason Taumalolo	Tonga; New Zealand	2014–	34

=== Women ===
Inducted	Player	Nation	Years	Caps
2026	Ali Brigginshaw	Australia	2009–2025	29
2026	Karyn Murphy	Australia	1998–2013	28
2026	Honey Hireme-Smiler	New Zealand	2003–2019	32
2026	Luisa Avaiki	New Zealand; Samoa	1995–2008	25
2026	Tahnee Norris	Australia	1998–2013	33
2026	Trish Hina	New Zealand	1999–2010	22
