= Australia women's national rugby league team =

Australian Jillaroos

Team information
- Nickname: The Jillaroos
- Governing body: Australian Rugby League Commission
- Region: Asia-Pacific
- Head coach: Jess Skinner
- Captain: Isabelle Kelly
- Most caps: Tahnee Norris (32)
- Top try-scorer: Julia Robinson (24)
- Top point-scorer: Julia Robinson (96)
- IRL ranking: 1 (20 August 2026)

Uniforms
First colours	Second colours

Team results
- First international
- Australia 14-18 New Zealand (Lidcombe Oval, Sydney, 1 July 1995)
- Biggest win
- Australia 124–6 Wales (Sydney, Australia; 1 November 2026)
- Biggest defeat
- Australia 6-50 New Zealand (England; 18 November 2000)
- World Cup
- Appearances: 7 (first time in 2000)
- Best result: Champions (2013, 2017, 2021, 2026)

The Australia women's national rugby league team, also known as the Australian Jillaroos, or Harvey Norman Jillaroos for sponsorship reasons, represents Australia in women's rugby league. They played their first formal international in 1995 under the administration of the Australian Women's Rugby League. The AWRL affiliated with the Australian Rugby League in the late 1990s, with AWRL reports included in ARL annual reports. Since the advent of the Australian Rugby League Commission in February 2012, the team has been administered by that body and the National Rugby League.

The Australian Jillaroos trace their history back to the pioneering women's rugby league matches played at the Sydney Showground in 1921 and 1930. The first game in 1921 drawing over 30,000 spectators to watch the Metropolitan Blues defeat the Sydney Reds 21–11, featuring 15-year-old footballer Maggie Moloney.

The Australian Jillaroos are current world champions, having won the last three Women's Rugby League World Cup tournaments. Their first World Cup victory came in the fourth tournament, in 2013. The Jillaroos won on home soil in 2017 and again in the postponed 2021 tournament held in November 2022. Appointed in February 2025, the current head coach of the Jillaroos is Jess Skinner.

Matches have been broadcast on free-to-air networks since 2014 (Nines) and 2015 (Test Match).

The Jillaroos squad is selected by a panel of national selectors. There are specific tournaments and matches that act as selection trials. These include:

- The Women's State of Origin between Queensland and New South Wales teams.
- The NRL Women's Premiership
- All Stars match
- The National Championships
- Affiliated States Championships (VIC, SA, WA, NT)

The team nickname "The Jillaroos" was first adopted c.2000 and is based on the jillaroo (a female jackaroo).

== Coaches ==
=== Full internationals ===
The current coach of the Australian team is Jess Skinner. After coaching the team on an interim basis in early 2025, Skinner was subsequently confirmed as coach through to the World Cup in October–November 2026. Previous coaches have included Paul Dyer, Graham Murray, and Steve Folkes.

Name	Span	M	W	D	L	W%	Ref.
Name	Graham Willard	1995	2	0	0	2	0.00%
John Taylor	1996–1997	5	1	0	4	20.00%	
Mark Donkin	1998	2	2	0	0	100.00%	
Wayne Portlock	1999–2000	7	1	0	6	14.29%	
Graham Arndt and Damien Lindeburg	2001	1	0	0	1	0.00%	
Terry Borland	2002	3	2	0	1	66.67%	
Dave Leat	2003–07	10	5	0	5	50.00%	
Karen Stuart	2008–09	7	5	0	2	71.43%	
Graham Murray	2010–11	1	1	0	0	100.00%	
Mark Riddell	2012						
Paul Dyer	2013	4	3	0	1	75.00%	
Steve Folkes	2014–16	3	1	0	2	33.33%	
Brad Donald	2017–2024	18	17	0	1	94.44%	
Jess Skinner	2025–	9	9	0	0	100.00%	

Notes

- Table last updated 15 November 2026 (after the World Cup Final).
- John Taylor was head trainer in 1995. Player recollection confirmed his involvement as head coach in 1996. The 1997 NZRL Annual records Taylor as Australia's head coach during the four-match tour.
- A report in the 2001 ARL Annual Report records that Graham Arndt and Daniel Lindeburg were joint coaches at a pre-tour training camp. Player recollection confirmed their involvement in Auckland where the one-off Test was played.

=== Nines ===
Name	Span	M	W	D	L	W%	Ref.
Steve Folkes	2015–16	6	2	0	0	33%	
Brad Donald	2017–19	11	10	0	1	91%	

== Players ==
=== Current squad ===
The squad for the 2026 Rugby League World Cup was announced on 5 October 2026. Isabelle Kelly was appointed captain.

Jersey numbers in the table reflect selections for the World Cup Final match versus New Zealand.

Players' ages are as at the date that the table was last updated, 15 November 2026.

J#	Player	Age	Position(s)	Jillaroos						NRLW							Other Reps
J#	Player	Age	Position(s)	Dbt	M	T	G	F	Pts	2026 Club	CM	TM	T	G	F	Pts	Other Reps
1	Tamika Upton	29	Fullback	2023	13	18	0	0	72	Broncos	38	64	61	0	0	244	12 2
2	Jaime Chapman	24	Wing, Centre	2022	10	18	0	0	72	Titans	33	47	30	0	0	120	11 6 1 3
3	Jessica Sergis	29	Centre	2019	18	23	0	0	92	Roosters	49	59	45	0	0	180	16 3 1
4	Isabelle Kelly	30	Centre	2017	25	21	0	0	84	Roosters	66	68	30	0	0	120	19 1 3
5	Abbi Church	28	Wing, Fullback	2025	5	9	0	0	36	Eels	48	48	11	0	0	44	6 1 3
6	Jesse Southwell	21	Five-eighth, Halfback	2025	5	1	40	0	84	Broncos	14	54	9	158	0	352	8 1
7	Tarryn Aiken	27	Halfback	2022	15	7	23	0	74	Roosters	37	56	24	7	1	111	11
8	Millie Elliott	28	Prop	2019	8	0	0	0	0	Roosters	31	51	10	0	0	40	12
9	Olivia Higgins	34	Hooker	2024	9	0	0	0	0	Knights	52	59	17	0	0	68	6 2
10	Simaima Taufa	32	Prop, Lock	2014	22	0	0	0	0	Raiders	38	59	17	0	0	68	12 2 2
11	Tiana Penitani Gray	30	Second-row, Centre	2019	12	5	0	0	20	Sharks	40	56	20	0	0	80	1 12 4
12	Shaylee Bent	26	Second-row	2022	8	4	0	0	16	Tigers	12	63	8	0	0	32	4 7 4 2
13	Olivia Kernick	25	Lock, Second-row	2022	15	7	0	0	28	Roosters	60	60	24	0	0	96	12 3 2 2
14	Keeley Nizza	26	Hooker	2018	13	3	0	0	12	Roosters	46	69	12	0	0	48	13 5 1
15	Keilee Joseph	24	Lock, Prop	2022	13	5	0	0	20	Eels	8	53	7	0	0	28	9 6
16	Kezie Apps	35	Second-row	2014	26	4	0	0	16	Tigers	31	50	9	0	0	36	20 2 7 2
17	Sariah Paki	24	Second-row, Centre	2026	4	1	0	0	4	Roosters	13	13	6	0	0	24	—
18	Sheridan Gallagher	24	Fullback, Wing	2026	1	0	0	0	0	Raiders	13	45	28	14	0	140	—
19	Sarah Togatuki	28	Prop, Lock	2024	7	0	0	0	0	Tigers	39	58	9	0	0	36	1 11 4 1
20	Quincy Dodd	26	Hooker	2024	7	2	0	0	8	Sharks	37	55	17	0	0	68	5 8 7 4
21	Jocelyn Kelleher	26	Five-eighth	2026	3	2	18	0	44	Roosters	64	64	8	169	1	371	6 3
22	Ellie Johnston	25	Prop	2025	5	1	0	0	4	Sharks	43	58	16	0	0	64	6 5
–	Makenzie Weale	24	Lock, Prop	2026	2	1	0	0	4	Cowboys	31	35	7	0	0	28	9 1
JI	Julia Robinson	28	Centre, Wing	2018	15	24	0	0	96	Broncos	60	60	40	0	0	160	12

Notes:

- Ali Brigginshaw was available for the tournament but missed selection.
- Two members of the squad have previously played for other nations:
  - Samoa : Sarah Togatuki (in 2019),
  - Tonga : Tiana Penitani-Gray (in 2023, having played for Australia in 2019).
- Five of the 23 squad members have played for Queensland, seventeen for New South Wales.

=== Hall of Fame ===
In August 2024 the NRL announced the induction of six former Jillaroos players into the National Rugby League Hall of Fame. This was the first induction of women since the inception of the Hall of Fame in 2008.

Inductee number	Player	National Team		State Team	Clubs	Ref
Inductee number	Player	Matches	Years	State Team	Clubs	Ref
127	Natalie Dwyer	26	1995, 1997, 1999, 2000, 2001, 2002, 2004, 2011, 2013	NSW & Qld	Wollongong Wildcats, South Sydney Rabbitohs, Souths Logan Magpies	
128	Katrina Fanning	24	1995, 1996, 1997, 1999, 2000, 2001, 2002, 2003, 2004	NSW	Queanbeyan, Gungahlin Bulls, Boomanulla	
129	Tarsha Gale	15	1995, 1997, 1998, 1999, 2000	NSW	Bulli, South Sydney Rabbitohs	
130	Veronica White	17	1995, 1997, 1998, 1999, 2000, 2001, 2002, 2004	Qld & NSW	Ipswich Brothers	
131	Karyn Murphy	28	1998, 1999, 2000, 2001, 2003, 2004, 2007, 2008, 2011, 2013	Qld	South Brisbane Magpies, Ipswich Brothers, Souths Logan Magpies	
132	Tahnee Norris	33	1998, 1999, 2000, 2001, 2002, 2003, 2004, 2007, 2008, 2009, 2011, 2013	NSW & Qld	South Sydney Rabbitohs, Norths Devils, Ipswich Brothers, Runaway Bay Seagulls, West Centenary Panthers, Burleigh Bears	

Note: The lists of clubs in the above table is incomplete.

=== Hall of Legends ===
On 12 November 2026, the IRL announced the inaugural induction of 42 players into the International Rugby League Hall of Legends. Six women were amongst the initial inductees, including three Jillaroos.

Player	National Team		State Team	Clubs	Ref
Player	Matches	Years	State Team	Clubs	Ref
Ali Brigginshaw	29	2009, 2011, 2013, 2014, 2015, 2017, 2018, 2019, 2022, 2023, 2024, 2025	Qld	Souths Logan Magpies, Ipswich Brothers, Brisbane Broncos	
Karyn Murphy	28	1998, 1999, 2000, 2001, 2003, 2004, 2007, 2008, 2011, 2013	Qld	South Brisbane Magpies, Ipswich Brothers, Souths Logan Magpies	
Tahnee Norris	33	1998, 1999, 2000, 2001, 2002, 2003, 2004, 2007, 2008, 2009, 2011, 2013	NSW & Qld	South Sydney Rabbitohs, Norths Devils, Ipswich Brothers, Runaway Bay Seagulls, West Centenary Panthers, Burleigh Bears	

Note: The lists of clubs in the above table is possibly incomplete.

== Competitive record ==
=== Head to head records ===
Opponent	FM	MR	M	W	D	L	Win%	PF	PA	Share
New Zealand	1995	2026	33	16	0	17	48.48%	557	626	47.08%
Great Britain	1996	2002	8	3	0	5	37.50%	100	111	47.39%
Fiji	1998	2026	3	3	0	0	0.00%	150	14	91.46%
New Zealand Māori	2003	2009	6	3	0	3	50.00%	90	104	46.39%
Niue	2003	2003	1	1	0	0	100.00%	58	0	100.00%
Samoa	2003	2026	4	4	0	0	100.00%	182	26	87.50%
France	2008	2022	3	3	0	0	100.00%	224	0	100.00%
Russia	2008	2008	1	1	0	0	100.00%	72	0	100.00%
England	2008	2026	5	5	0	0	100.00%	242	14	94.53%
Pacific Islands	2008	2008	1	1	0	0	100.00%	32	6	84.21%
Cook Islands	2017	2022	2	2	0	0	100.00%	132	4	93.55%
Canada	2017	2017	2	2	0	0	100.00%	146	6	96.05%
Papua New Guinea	2022	2024	2	2	0	0	100.00%	166	0	100.00%
Wales	2026	2026	1	1	0	0	100.00%	124	6	95.38%
Totals	1995	2026	72	47	0	25	65.28%	2,275	917	71.27%

Notes:

- Table last updated 15 November 2026 (after the World Cup Final).
- Share is the portion of "For" points compared to the sum of "For" and "Against" points.

=== Results ===
==== Full internationals ====
Date	Opponent	Score	Tournament	Venue	Video	Report(s)
1 Jul 1995	New Zealand	14 - 18	2 Test Series	Lidcombe Oval	—	
8 Jul 1995	New Zealand	6 - 14	2 Test Series	Hawker Oval, Canberra	—	
21 Jul 1996	Great Britain	16 – 14	3 Test Series	Phillip Oval, Canberra		
28 Jul 1996	Great Britain	12 – 18	3 Test Series	Gilbert Park, Brisbane	—	
3 Aug 1996	Great Britain	18 – 20	3 Test Series	Redfern Oval, Sydney		
20 Sep 1997	New Zealand	26 – 34	2 Test Series	Petone Recreation Ground, Wellington	—	
24 Sep 1997	New Zealand	16 – 40	2 Test Series	Carlaw Park, Auckland	—	
19 Sep 1998	Fiji	68 – 0	2 Test Series	University of South Pacific, Suva	—	
26 Sep 1998	Fiji	52 – 0	2 Test Series	University of South Pacific, Suva	—	
23 Sep 1999	New Zealand	10 – 20	3 Test Series	Leichhardt Oval	—	
27 Sep 1999	New Zealand	22 – 20	3 Test Series	Penrith Stadium		
29 Oct 1999	New Zealand	14 – 26	3 Test Series	Ericsson Stadium Auckland	—	
10 Nov 2000	New Zealand	6 – 10	2000 World Cup	South Leeds Stadium		
14 Nov 2000	Great Britain	10 – 14	2000 World Cup	Rams Stadium, Dewsbury		
18 Nov 2000	New Zealand	6 – 50	2000 World Cup	Rams Stadium, Dewsbury	—	
21 Nov 2000	Great Britain	0 – 4	2000 World Cup	The Jungle, Castleford		
23 Sep 2001	New Zealand	8 – 42	Test Match	Carlaw Park, Auckland	—	
14 Jul 2002	Great Britain	16 – 26	3 Test Series	Ringrose Park, Wentworthville		
20 Jul 2002	Great Britain	14 – 10	3 Test Series	ANZ Stadium, Brisbane	—	
27 Jul 2002	Great Britain	14 – 5	3 Test Series	Bruce Stadium, Canberra		
8 Aug 2003	New Zealand Māori	20 – 14	Test Match	Suncorp Stadium, Brisbane	—	
28 Sep 2003	New Zealand Māori	28 – 24	2003 World Cup	North Harbour Stadium	—	
2 Oct 2003	Niue	58 – 0	2003 World Cup	North Harbour Stadium	—	
6 Oct 2003	New Zealand	4 – 44	2003 World Cup	North Harbour Stadium	—	
8 Oct 2003	Samoa	40 – 12	2003 World Cup	North Harbour Stadium	—	
10 Oct 2003	New Zealand Māori	4 – 12	2003 World Cup	North Harbour Stadium	—	
14 Aug 2004	New Zealand	12 – 38	2 Test Series	Bendigo Bank Oval, Ipswich	—	
21 Aug 2004	New Zealand	20 – 30	2 Test Series	Davies Park, Brisbane		
31 Oct 2007	New Zealand Māori	20 – 16	2 Test Series	Rotorua	—	
3 Nov 2007	New Zealand Māori	4 – 20	2 Test Series	Rotorua	—	
6 Nov 2008	France	60 – 0	2008 World Cup	Stockland Park, Sunshine Coast	—	
8 Nov 2008	Russia	72 – 0	2008 World Cup	Stockland Park, Sunshine Coast	—	
10 Nov 2008	England	22 – 4	2008 World Cup	Stockland Park, Sunshine Coast	—	
12 Nov 2008	Pacific Islands	32 – 6	2008 World Cup	Stockland Park, Sunshine Coast	—	
15 Nov 2008	New Zealand	0 – 34	2008 World Cup	Suncorp Stadium, Brisbane		
16 Sep 2009	New Zealand Māori	14 – 18	2009 Tour	New Zealand	—	
23 Sep 2009	New Zealand	18 – 16	2009 Tour	Ellerslie Domain, Auckland	—	
3 Sep 2011	Samoa	42 – 14	Test Match	Apia Park, Apia	—	
15 Oct 2011	New Zealand	Cancelled	Test Match	Gold Coast	—	
5 Jul 2013	England	14 – 6	2013 World Cup	The Tetley's Stadium, Dewsbury		
8 Jul 2013	France	72 – 0	2013 World Cup	Post Office Road, Featherstone		
11 Jul 2013	New Zealand	6 – 14	2013 World Cup	Fox's Biscuits Stadium, Batley		
14 Jul 2013	New Zealand	22 – 12	2013 World Cup	Headingley, Leeds		
9 Nov 2014	New Zealand	8 – 12	Test Match	WIN Stadium, Wollongong		
3 May 2015	New Zealand	22 – 14	Anzac Test	Suncorp Stadium, Brisbane	—	
6 May 2016	New Zealand	16 – 26	Anzac Test	Hunter Stadium, Newcastle	—	
5 May 2017	New Zealand	16 – 4	Anzac Test	GIO Stadium, Canberra		
16 Nov 2017	Cook Islands	58 – 4	2017 World Cup	Southern Cross Group Stadium, Sydney		
19 Nov 2017	England	38 – 0	2017 World Cup	Southern Cross Group Stadium, Sydney		
22 Nov 2017	Canada	88 – 0	2017 World Cup	Southern Cross Group Stadium, Sydney		
26 Nov 2017	Canada	58 – 6	2017 World Cup	Southern Cross Group Stadium, Sydney		
2 Dec 2017	New Zealand	23 – 16	2017 World Cup	Suncorp Stadium, Brisbane		
13 Oct 2018	New Zealand	26 – 24	Test Match	Mount Smart Stadium, Auckland		
25 Oct 2019	New Zealand	28 – 8	Test Match	WIN Stadium, Wollongong		
2 Nov 2022	Cook Islands	74 – 0	2021 World Cup	York Community Stadium, York		
6 Nov 2022	France	92 – 0	2021 World Cup	York Community Stadium, York		
10 Nov 2022	New Zealand	10 – 8	2021 World Cup	York Community Stadium, York		
14 Nov 2022	Papua New Guinea	82 – 0	2021 World Cup	York Community Stadium, York		
19 Nov 2022	New Zealand	54 – 4	2021 World Cup	Old Trafford, Manchester		
14 Oct 2023	New Zealand	16 – 10	Test Match	Qld Country Bank Stadium, Townsville		
28 Oct 2023	New Zealand	6 – 12	Test Match	AAMI Park, Melbourne		
18 Oct 2024	Papua New Guinea	84 – 0	2024 Pacific Championships	Suncorp Stadium, Brisbane		
27 Oct 2024	New Zealand	14 – 0	2024 Pacific Championships	Rugby League Park, Christchurch		
10 Nov 2024	New Zealand	24 – 4	2024 Pacific Championships	Commbank Stadium, Sydney		
1 Mar 2025	England	90 – 4	Test Match (Rugby League Las Vegas)	Allegiant Stadium, Las Vegas		
26 Oct 2025	Samoa	60 – 0	2025 Pacific Championships	Suncorp Stadium, Brisbane		
2 Nov 2025	New Zealand	10 – 4	2025 Pacific Championships	Eden Park, Auckland		
9 Nov 2025	New Zealand	40 – 8	2025 Pacific Championships	CommBank Stadium		
16 Oct 2026	Samoa	40 – 0	2026 World Cup	CommBank Stadium		
24 Oct 2026	England	78 – 0	2026 World Cup	HBF Park		
1 Nov 2026	Wales	124 – 6	2026 World Cup	CommBank Stadium, Sydney		
8 Nov 2026	Fiji	30 – 14	2026 World Cup	Allianz Stadium, Sydney		
15 Nov 2026	New Zealand	34 – 10	2026 World Cup	Suncorp Stadium, Brisbane		

==== Nines ====
Date	Opponent	Score	Tournament	Venue	Video	Report(s)
31 Jan 2015	New Zealand	4 – 8	2015 Auckland Nines	Eden Park, Auckland	—	
1 Feb 2015	New Zealand	4 – 16	2015 Auckland Nines	Eden Park, Auckland	—	
1 Feb 2015	New Zealand	8 – 7	2015 Auckland Nines	Eden Park, Auckland		
6 Feb 2016	New Zealand	11 – 4	2016 Auckland Nines	Eden Park, Auckland		
7 Feb 2016	New Zealand	0 – 9	2016 Auckland Nines	Eden Park, Auckland		
7 Feb 2016	New Zealand	7 – 21	2016 Auckland Nines	Eden Park, Auckland		
4 Feb 2017	New Zealand	20 – 4	2017 Auckland Nines	Eden Park, Auckland		
5 Feb 2017	New Zealand	8 – 0	2017 Auckland Nines	Eden Park, Auckland		
5 Feb 2017	New Zealand	14 – 4	2017 Auckland Nines	Eden Park, Auckland	—	
23 Feb 2018	Samoa	26 – 4	2018 Commonwealth Championship	Dolphin Oval, Redcliffe	—	
23 Feb 2018	Fiji	24 – 0	2018 Commonwealth Championship	Dolphin Oval, Redcliffe	—	
24 Feb 2018	Cook Islands	14 – 8	2018 Commonwealth Championship	Dolphin Oval, Redcliffe	—	
24 Feb 2018	Samoa	14 – 8	2018 Commonwealth Championship	Dolphin Oval, Redcliffe	—	
18 Oct 2019	New Zealand	22 – 8	2019 International Nines	Bankwest Stadium, Parramatta		
19 Oct 2019	England	42 – 4	2019 International Nines	Bankwest Stadium, Parramatta		
19 Oct 2019	Papua New Guinea	30 – 6	2019 International Nines	Bankwest Stadium, Parramatta		
19 Oct 2019	New Zealand	15 – 17	2019 International Nines	Bankwest Stadium, Parramatta		

== Records ==
As of 16 November 2026

Games played: 32

- Tahnee Norris
  - Ali Brigginshaw played 29 Tests.
  - 2026 World Cup squad members with the most appearances are: Kezie Apps (26), Isabelle Kelly (25), and Simaima Taufa (22 matches).

Points scored: 96

- Julia Robinson
  - Other 2026 World Cup squad members with the most points are Jessica Sergis (92), Isabelle Kelly and Jesse Southwell (both 84 points).

Tries scored: 24

- Julia Robinson
  - Other 2026 World Cup squad members with the most tries are Jessica Sergis (23) and Isabelle Kelly (21 tries).

Goals kicked: 40

- Jesse Southwell
  - 2026 World Cup squad members with the most goals are: Tarryn Aiken (23), and Jocelyn Kelleher (18). Southwell went past Lauren Brown (31 goals) on 1 November 2026.

Points scored in a match: 44

- Jesse Southwell (1 try, 20 goals) vs Wales, World Cup, 1 November 2026.
  - Previous best: Julia Robinson (24 points from 6 tries) vs Papua New Guinea, Pacific Championships, 18 October 2024

Tries scored in a match: 6

- Julia Robinson vs Papua New Guinea, Pacific Championships, 18 October 2024
- Jaime Chapman vs Wales, World Cup, 1 November 2026

Goals kicked in a match: 20

- Jesse Southwell vs Wales, World Cup, 1 November 2026.
  - Previously: Tarryn Aiken vs England, International Test series, 2 March 2025

=== Margins and streaks ===
Biggest winning margins

Margin	Score	Opponent	Venue	Date
118	124–6	Wales	CommBank Stadium	1 Nov 2026
92	92–0	France	LNER Community Stadium	6 Nov 2022
88	88–0	Canada	Southern Cross Group Stadium	22 Nov 2017
86	90–4	England	Allegiant Stadium	1 Mar 2025
84	84–0	Papua New Guinea	Suncorp Stadium	18 Oct 2024
82	82–0	Papua New Guinea	LNER Community Stadium	14 Nov 2022
78	78–0	England	HBF Park	24 Oct 2026
74	74–0	Cook Islands	LNER Community Stadium	2 Nov 2022
72	72–0	France	LD Nutrition Stadium	8 July 2013
72	72–0	Russia	Sunshine Coast Stadium	8 Nov 2008
68	68–0	Fiji	National Stadium, Suva	19 Sep 1998
60	60–0	France	Sunshine Coast Stadium	6 Nov 2008
60	60–0	Samoa	Suncorp Stadium	26 Oct 2025
58	58–0	Niue	North Harbour Stadium	2 Oct 2003
54	58–4	Cook Islands	Southern Cross Group Stadium	16 Nov 2017
52	58–6	Canada	Southern Cross Group Stadium	26 Nov 2017
52	52–0	Fiji	National Stadium	26 Sep 1998
50	54–4	New Zealand	Old Trafford	19 Nov 2022

Biggest losing margins

Margin	Score	Opponent	Venue	Date
44	6–50	New Zealand	OneBore Stadium	18 Nov 2000
40	4–44	New Zealand	North Harbour Stadium	4 Oct 2003
34	8–42	New Zealand	Carlaw Park	22 Sept 2001
34	0–34	New Zealand	Suncorp Stadium	15 Nov 2008
26	12–38	New Zealand	North Ipswich Reserve	14 Aug 2004
24	16–40	New Zealand	Petone Recreation Ground	20 Sep 1997
16	4–20	New Zealand Māori	International Stadium	3 Nov 2007
10	16–26	New Zealand	McDonald Jones Stadium	6 May 2016
10	10–20	New Zealand	Leichhardt Oval	23 Sep 1999
10	16–26	Great Britain	Ringrose Park, Wentworthville	14 July 2002

Most consecutive wins

Matches	First win	Last win	Days	Ended	Days
14	5 May 2017	14 Oct 2023	6 years, 162 days	28 Oct 2023	6 years, 176 days
12	18 Oct 2024	15 Nov 2026	2 years, 28 days	Current	2 years, 35 days

Most consecutive losses

Matches	First loss	Last loss	Days	Ended	Days
7	29 Oct 1999	14 Jul 2002	2 years, 259 days	20 Jul 2002	2 years, 265 days

== Individual awards ==
Since 2015 a Female Player of the Year award has been included in the Dally M Awards.

Year	Player	Rep Teams	NRLW Club	State Club	References
2015	Jenni-Sue Hoepper	Jillaroos QLD	—	Townsville Brothers	
2016	Kezie Apps	Jillaroos NSW	—	Helensburgh Tigers	
2017	Simaima Taufa	Jillaroos NSW	—	Mounties	
2018	Brittany Breayley	Jillaroos QLD	Brisbane Broncos	Ipswich Brothers	
2019	Jessica Sergis	Jillaroos NSW	St George-Illawarra Dragons	Helensburgh Tigers	
2020	Ali Brigginshaw	QLD (Note: Due to the COVID-19 pandemic in Australia the interstate match was postponed from June to November, after the presentation of the award in October)	Brisbane Broncos	Ipswich Brothers	
2021 (Note: The award for the 2021 Season, which was held between 27 February and 10 April 2022, was tied with duel winners announced.)	Millie Boyle	NSW	Brisbane Broncos	Burleigh Bears	
2021	Emma Tonegato	NSW	St George-Illawarra Dragons	—	
2022	Raecene McGregor	Kiwi Ferns	Sydney Roosters	North Sydney Bears	
2023	Tamika Upton	QLD Jillaroos (Note: Upton played for Australia in October, after the presentation of the award in late September)	Newcastle Knights	Newcastle Knights	
2024	Olivia Kernick	NSW	Sydney Roosters	Tweed Seagulls	
2025	Tamika Upton	QLD Jillaroos	Brisbane Broncos	—	
2026	Tamika Upton	QLD Jillaroos (Note: Upton played for Australia in October, after the presentation of the award in late September)	Brisbane Broncos	—	

== Golden Boot ==
Since 2018 an International Female Player of the Year award has been included in the International Rugby League Golden Boot Award.

Year	Player	Rep Teams	NRLW Club	References
2018	Isabelle Kelly	Jillaroos NSW	Sydney Roosters	
2019	Jessica Sergis	Jillaroos NSW	St George-Illawarra Dragons	
2020	Not awarded due to the COVID-19 pandemic in Australia (Note: The interstate match was postponed to November, which was after the presentation of the awards in October)			
2021	Not awarded due to the COVID-19 pandemic in Australia			
2022	Raecene McGregor	Kiwi Ferns	Sydney Roosters	
2023	Georgia Hale	Kiwi Ferns (Note: Hale represented the Kiwi Ferns in the 2023 Pacific Championships)	Gold Coast Titans	
2024	Tarryn Aiken	Jillaroos QLD	Sydney Roosters	
2025	Julia Robinson	Jillaroos QLD	Brisbane Broncos	
2026	Stacey Waaka	Kiwi Ferns	New Zealand Warriors	

== IRL Rankings ==
IRL Women's World Rankings
Official rankings as of August 2026
Rank	Change	Team	Pts %
1	Steady	Australia	100
2	Steady	New Zealand	64
3	Steady	England	40
4	Steady	France	25
5	Steady	Samoa	22
6	Steady	Papua New Guinea	19
7	▲6	Canada	19
8	Steady	Ireland	18
9	▼2	Wales	17
10	Steady	Nigeria	16
11	▼2	Cook Islands	15
12	Steady	Fiji	13
13	▲2	Tonga	12
14	▲2	United States	12
15	▼4	Greece	11
16	▼2	Netherlands	10
17	▲3	Scotland	8
18	▼1	Serbia	4
19	▼1	Kenya	4
20	▼1	Ghana	4
21	▲2	Brazil	3
22	▲2	Jamaica	3
23	▼2	Italy	2
24	▼2	Philippines	2
25	▲1	Lebanon	2
26	▼1	Uganda	1
27	Steady	Malta	1
28	Steady	Turkey	1
Complete rankings at www.internationalrugbyleague.com

== See also ==
Men

- Australian Kangaroos
- Australian Aboriginal rugby league team
- Junior Kangaroos
- Australian Schoolboys
- Prime Minister's XIII

Women's Governance and History

- Women's rugby league in Australia

Women's Teams

- Indigenous All Stars
- Queensland women's rugby league team
- New South Wales women's rugby league team
- City New South Wales women's rugby league team
- Country New South Wales women's rugby league team

Women's Competitions

- Tier 1 NRL Women's Premiership
- Tier 2 QRL Women's Premiership
- Tier 2 NSWRL Women's Premiership
- Tier 3 Sydney Metropolitan Women's Rugby League
- Tier 3 Brisbane and District Women's Rugby League
