= 1995 New Zealand women's rugby league tour of Australia =

- Manager: Diana Hay, Yvonne Hiko, Ollie Karu, Maia Le Cheminant
- Coach(es): Janie Thompson
- Tour captain(s): Juanita Hall
- Top point scorer(s): Zavana Aranga 42
- Top try scorer(s): Laura Waretini 8
- Top test point scorer(s): Leah Witehira 8
- Top test try scorer(s): Leah Witehira 2
Summary
P	W	D	L
Total
7	7	0	0
Test match
2	2	0	0
Opponent
P	W	D	L
Australia
2	2	0	0

The 1995 New Zealand Women's rugby league tour of Australia was the first of its kind by a national women's rugby league team. The New Zealand women's national rugby league team played seven matches on the tour, including the inaugural international matches in women’s rugby league. New Zealand won all seven matches, including the two international matches against Australia.

== Background ==
Women’s rugby league in New Zealand had seen growth in participation numbers during the early 1990s. In 1995 there were nearly 110 teams playing club football, including 32 in Auckland. The year prior, 1994, there had been 23 women’s teams in Auckland.

Women’s rugby league had also been developing in Australia during the early 1990s. A national championship for club teams was introduced in 1991 in the form of a tournament over the June long weekend. This continued through 1992, 1993 and 1994.

A combined ACT team made a short tour of the North Island of New Zealand in April 1992, playing four club teams: North Auckland, Ellerslie, North Shore, and Rotorua. An ACT representative team was selected from four clubs to meet Illawarra in August 1992.

During 1993, two women's teams from Australia, the Woden Valley Rams and a club based in Waverton, New South Wales, arranged with the Fijian Rugby League to play a match in early October 1993 in Suva as a curtain-raiser to a men's match between Fiji and Queensland Residents. The match was played on Friday, 1 October 1993. Waverton Eagles defeated Woden Valley Rams, 14 to 10, prior to the Queensland Residents defeating Fiji by 28 to 4. Following this club match, an Australian team was selected from the players present to play a Fijian women's team on Tuesday, 5 October 1993. Played in torrential rain, the Australian team defeated the Fijian team, 16 to 4.

In December 1993, the interim committee of the Australian Women's Rugby League announced their intention to seek affiliation with the Australian Rugby League, and with or without affiliation, to play an international against New Zealand in 1994.

In Australia during 1995 there were women’s rugby league competitions in three centres. The Sydney competition featured eight teams, including one from Wollongong. This was an increase from six teams in 1993 and five in 1994. In Canberra and surrounds, there were three teams in the 1995 competition.

== New Zealand squad ==
The touring team was selected following a twelve-team national tournament held in Nelson on the June long weekend. Auckland Blue had defeated Auckland White in the trophy final, and 16 players from Auckland were selected in the squad of 23 women. Wellington had fielded two teams, A and B, and saw three players selected. A further three were selected from the West Coast provincial team, and one from Canterbury. Other teams at the tournament were Hawkes Bay, Nelson-Marlborough A & B, Manawatu, Southland and a President’s XIII.

From a club perspective, Richmond provided seven players; Bay Roskill provided four; and the Marist club from Greymouth on the West Coast, three players.

=== Team leadership ===
Juanita Hall was appointed captain, with Eileen Rankin as vice-captain.

The team was coached by Janie Thompson (Auckland). The support staff were Josie O’Dwyer (Auckland) as masseur and a group of tour managers: Diana Hay (West Coast), Yvonne Hiko (Auckland), Ollie Karu (Manawatu), and Maia Le Cheminant (Canterbury).

Referee Helen McRae (Nelson-Marlborough) travelled with the team.

=== Players’ tour record ===
H#	Player	Position(s)	Club	Province	Test Matches				Tour Matches
H#	Player	Position(s)	Club	Province	M	T	G	P	T	G	P
2	Zavana Aranga	Centre	—	Wellington	2	0	1	2	3	15	42
3	Maria Auega	Hooker	—	Wellington	2	1	0	4	2	0	8
4	Luisa Avaiki	Prop	Richmond Roses	Auckland	2	1	0	4	1	0	4
5	Golly Baker	Hooker	Bay Roskill Vikings	Auckland	1	0	0	0	1	0	4
6	Nadene Conlon	Second-row	Marist Saints	Auckland	2	0	0	0	1	0	4
7	Wendy Cunningham	Prop	Richmond Roses	Auckland	2	0	0	0	0	0	0
8	Michelle Driscoll	Centre	Richmond Roses	Auckland	0	0	0	0	0	0	0
9	Eva Epiha	Centre	Howick Hornets	Auckland	1	0	0	0	3	0	12
1	Juanita Hall	Prop	Richmond Roses	Auckland	2	0	0	0	0	0	0
10	Sharlene Hannah	Second-row	Greymouth Marist	West Coast	1	0	0	0	1	0	4
11	Kaylene Ihaia	Halfback	—	Wellington	0	0	0	0	0	0	0
13	Therese Mangos	Stand-off	Richmond Roses	Auckland	2	0	0	0	0	2	4
12	Tania Martin	Wing	—	Auckland	1	0	0	0	3	0	12
14	Nicole Presland	Prop	Bay Roskill Vikings	Auckland	2	0	0	0	0	0	0
15	Eileen Rankin	Second-row	Mangere East Hawks	Auckland	2	0	0	0	1	0	4
16	Debbie Syme	Wing	Greymouth Marist	West Coast	2	0	0	0	0	0	0
17	Megan Tahapeehi	Prop, Second-row	Greymouth Marist	West Coast	0	0	0	0	0	0	0
18	Lynley Tierney	Wing, Centre	Mt Wellington	Auckland	2	1	0	4	4	0	16
19	Laura Waretini	Wing	Woolston Rams	Canterbury	1	1	1	6	8	1	34
20	Rachel White	Loose forward	Bay Roskill Vikings	Auckland	2	0	0	0	1	0	4
21	Sara White	Wing	Bay Roskill Vikings	Auckland	1	0	0	0	3	0	12
22	Tammi Wilson	Fullback	Richmond Roses	Auckland	2	1	0	4	6	0	24
23	Leah Witehira	Scrum-half	Otahuhu Leopards	Auckland	2	2	0	8	4	0	16

Notes

- The Lion Red Rugby League Annual 1995 has one discrepancy with newspaper reporting. In the Second Test, the Annual lists Zavana Aranga as kicking the lone goal for New Zealand. The newspaper report in the Canberra Times lists Laura Waretini as the goal-kicker.
- A player's 1995 club is displayed in the above table, where known.
- Megan Tahapeehi is the sister of Quentin Pongia (35 matches for the New Zealand Kiwis, 167 top-tier club matches, 1993 to 2004).

== Australia squad ==
In a squad of 20 players, six women were selected from two of three clubs in the Canberra competition: Tuggeranong and Woden Valley Rams. Several other members of the squad were playing for the Illawarra based team, the Cabbage Tree Hotel.

=== Team leadership ===
Natalie Dwyer was selected as captain, with Robyn Miller as vice-captain.

The team was coached by Graham Willard. The support staff were Tracy Gaunt (Manager), John Taylor (Head Trainer) and Scott D’Arcy (Trainer).

=== Players’ Test record ===
H#	Player	Position(s)	Club	State / Territory	Test Matches
H#	Player	Position(s)	Club	State / Territory	M	T	G	P
2	Alyssa Campbell	Fullback	Cabbage Tree Hotel	NSW	2	0	0	0
3	Kellie Chessor	Second-row	Cabbage Tree Hotel	NSW	1	0	0	0
4	Renee Craft	Wing	Cabbage Tree Hotel	NSW	2	0	0	0
1	Natalie Dwyer	Centre	Cabbage Tree Hotel	NSW	2	1	0	4
5	Rommillia Emanuel	Fullback	Tuggeranong Castaways	ACT	2	0	0	0
6	Katrina Fanning	Prop	Tuggeranong Castaways	ACT	2	1	0	4
7	Tarsha Gale	Halfback	Cabbage Tree Hotel	NSW	2	0	0	0
8	Mandy Ingersoll	Second-row	—	—	2	0	0	0
9	Bronwyn Johnson	Wing	Tuggeranong Castaways	ACT	2	0	0	0
10	Julie McGuffie	Five-eighth	Cabbage Tree Hotel	NSW	2	1	0	4
11	Renee McMahon	Five-eighth	Woden Valley Rams	ACT	2	0	0	0
12	Robyn Miller	Second-row	Tuggeranong Castaways	ACT	2	0	0	0
13	Katrina Moss	Hooker	—	—	2	0	0	0
14	Sherrilee Moulds	Centre	Cabbage Tree Hotel	NSW	2	1	2	8
18	Loretta O'Neill	Fullback	—	—	1	0	0	0
15	Tracey Pilon	Second-row	—	—	2	0	0	0
16	Julie Porter	Lock	Cabbage Tree Hotel	NSW	1	0	0	0
–	Juanita Weldon	—	—	—	0	0	0	0
19	Veronica White	Second-row	—	NSW	1	0	0	0
17	Rebecca Wisener	Hooker	Woden Valley Rams	ACT	2	0	0	0

Notes

- A player's 1995 club is displayed in the above table, where known.
- In the Illawarra in 1994 there had been four teams playing in a local competition: Bulli Eagles, Lakeview Bears, Wollongong, and Picton Magpies. Due to a drop in playing numbers, a single team was entered into the Sydney Women's Rugby League competition as the Cabbage Tree Hotel (Bulli). A newspaper paragraph in September mentioned that the Bulli Eagles had defeated minor premiers Waverton Reds and would meet Parramatta in the Grand Final.
- Tarsha Gale is the sister of fellow rugby league footballers Scott Gale (210 top tier club matches between 1983 and 1993) and Brett Gale (86 top tier club matches between 1982 and 1989).
- Rommillia Emanuel is the sister of Ric Emanuel (Papua New Guinea, 1994 and Canberra Raiders lower grades, early 1990s).
- Renee Dalton (née Craft) is the sister of Davinia Kruger (née Craft) who played rugby union for Australia in 2002. Davinia's Wallaroo number is 66.
- Bronwyn Johnson and Rebecca Wisener had played for the ACT Women’s Rugby League team in 1992.
- Natalie Dwyer, Julie McGuffie, Sherliee Moulds, Katrina Moss and Julie Porter had played in the 1994 club championships.
- Julie Porter has previously played association football for Australia. Julie's Matildas number is 20.
- Natalie Dwyer had been selected in an Australian women’s cricket youth squad that toured India in November–December 1994 under the captaincy of Karen Rolton.

== Results ==
The Lion Red Rugby League Annual 1995 included the New Zealand scorers in all seven matches, and the Australian players in the two Test Matches. Scorers for the President's XIII and Sydney were not listed.

The President’s XIII included three players from the Australian Capital Territory.

Tuesday, 27 June 1995

President’s XIII	6 — 16	New Zealand
Tries: 1 Goals: 1	1st: 6–2; 2nd: 0–14	Tries: 3 Eva Epiha; Sara White; Eileen Rankin; Goals: 2 Therese Mangos 2

North Sydney

First Test

Saturday, 1 July 1995

Australia	14 — 18	New Zealand
Tries: 3 Natalie Dwyer; Julie McGuffie; Sherilee Moulds; Goals: 1 Sherilee Moulds	1st: 6–10; 2nd: 8–8	Tries: 4 Maria Auega; Leah Witehira; Lynley Tierney; Luisa Avaiki; Goals: 1 Zavana Aranga

Lidcombe Oval, Sydney
Attendance: ≈ 1000
Referee: Helen McRae (New Zealand)

Tuesday, 4 July 1995

Sydney	4 — 26	New Zealand
Tries: 1	1st: 4–12; 2nd: 0–14	Tries: 5 Tammi Wilson 2 Laura Waretini; Sharlene Hannah; Lynley Tierney; Goals: 3 Zavana Aranga 3

Ringrose Park, Wentworthville

Thursday, 6 July 1995

Canberra	0 — 46	New Zealand
	1st: 0–24; 2nd: 0–22	Tries: 10; Tania Martin 3 Laura Waretini 2 Leah Witehira 2 Eva Epiha 2 Zavana Aranga; Goals: 3 Zavana Aranga 3

Freebody Oval, Queanbeyan

Second Test

Saturday, 8 July 1995

Australia	6 — 14	New Zealand
Tries: 1 Katrina Fanning; Goals: 1 Sherilee Moulds	1st: 6–0; 2nd: 0–14	Tries: 3 Tammi Wilson; Leah Witehira; Laura Waretini; Goals: 1 Laura Waretini (or Zavana Aranga)

Hawker Oval, Canberra
Referee: Val Lawson (Australia).

Wednesday, 12 July 1995

Queensland	0 — 48	New Zealand
	1st: 0–20; 2nd: 0–28	Tries: 10; Laura Waretini 3 Sara White 2 Tammi Wilson 2 Lynley Tierney; Maria Auega; Zavana Aranga; Goals: 4 Zavana Aranga 4

Davies Park, Brisbane

Curtain-raiser to Gold Coast Seagulls versus South Queensland Crushers, ARL match

Saturday, 15 July 1995

Queensland	0 — 36	New Zealand
	1st: 0–10; 2nd: 0–26	Tries: 7 Tammi Wilson; Zavana Aranga; Laura Waretini; Golly Baker; Lynley Tierney; Nadene Conlon; Rachel White; Goals: 4 Zavana Aranga 4

Seagulls Stadium, Tweed Heads

== Sources ==
Sources used to inform the creation of this page were drawn from direct online, indirect online and offline resources.
Resources with direct online access included:

- Trove for digitised newspapers and journals. Most titles on this online library database are only available up to the mid-1950s, but the following are available in 1995: Canberra Times and Army.
- NRL articles on Jillaroos and Kiwi Ferns history.
- New Zealand Rugby League Roll of Honour

Indirect online resources are newspaper and journal content housed on database applications (such as Newsbank and ProQuest) accessed through library eResources. Access may require library membership. As an example, SLNSW eResources requires a membership number, although membership is free to residents of New South Wales. Different titles have different starting dates. Newspaper text content available in 1995 includes:

- The Dominion
- The Evening Post

Offline resources are physical copies of books, journals or microfilm. Items used prior to and during the creation of this page include:

- Lion Red Rugby League Annual 1995 (copy available at Auckland City Library)
