= Wayne Portlock =

Australian rugby league footballer

Personal information
- Full name: Wayne Portlock
- Born: 21 September 1962 (age 64)

Playing information
- Position: Fullback
Club
Years	Team	Pld	T	G	FG	P
1984	North Sydney	13	2	25	0	58
1985–90	Eastern Suburbs	45	11	22	3	91
1991	Hull FC	13	6	0	0	24
	Total	71	19	47	3	173

Coaching information
Representative
Years	Team	Gms	W	D	L	W%
1999–00	Australia Women	7	1	0	6	14
- Source: As of 6 November 2026

Wayne Portlock is an Australian former professional rugby league footballer who played in the 1980s and 1990s. He played for Eastern Suburbs and North Sydney in the NSWRL competition and for Hull FC in England.

== Playing career ==
Portlock made his first grade debut for North Sydney against defending premiers Parramatta in round 2 of the 1984 NSWRL season at Belmore Sports Ground. Portlock finished as the club's second highest point scorer for the year. In 1985, Portlock joined Eastern Suburbs where he spent the next six seasons. In 1991, Portlock joined English side Hull F.C. where he played one season. He finished his career in the Group 9 Rugby League competition with the Young Cherrypickers.

== Post playing ==
Following retirement, Portlock coached North Sydney at SG Ball, Jersey Flegg and NSW Cup levels. In 1999, he became a development officer with the New South Wales rugby league.

Portlock coached the Australia women's national rugby league team, the Jillaroos, in a three-match series against New Zealand in 1999, and in the 2000 Women's Rugby League World Cup.
