= Ben Henry =

New Zealand rugby league footballer

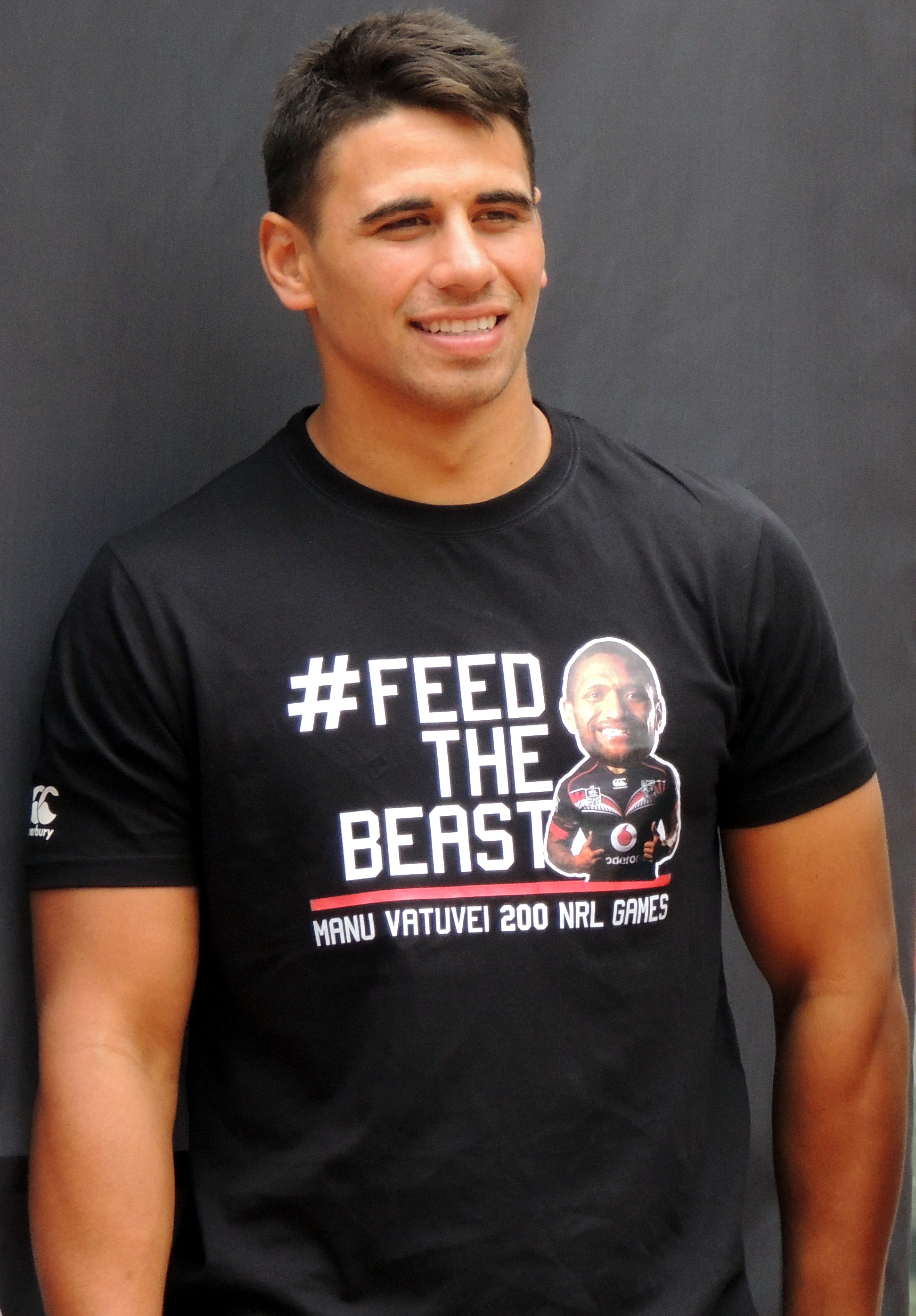

Personal information
- Born: 14 December 1991 (age 34) Auckland, New Zealand

Playing information
- Height: 185 cm (6 ft 1 in)
- Weight: 102 kg (16 st 1 lb)
- Position: Second-row, Lock, Centre, Hooker
Club
Years	Team	Pld	T	G	FG	P
2012–16	New Zealand Warriors	52	17	3	1	75
2018–2026	Bay Roskill	24	5	23	0	66
	Total	76	22	26	1	141
Representative
Years	Team	Pld	T	G	FG	P
2014	New Zealand	1	0	0	0	0

Ben Henry is a New Zealand former professional rugby league footballer who represented New Zealand and played for the New Zealand Warriors in the National Rugby League competition. Henry was a utility player who could fill in at lock, second-row, centre and hooker.

== Early years ==
Born in Auckland, New Zealand, Henry is of Cook Islands and Māori descent. Henry was educated at Kelston Boys' High School and played for the Bay Roskill Vikings before debuting for the Junior Warriors in the NYC at just 17 years old. Henry was named the 2009 New Zealand Warriors' Young NYC Player of the Year. Henry was appointed the Junior Warriors' captain in 2010, but missed the Grand Final victory due to injury. Henry again captained the side in 2011, leading the Junior Warriors to a second straight premiership. Henry finished his Junior Warriors career having played in a record 64 games.

== Playing career ==
=== 2012 ===
Henry was named to play his debut NRL match in the Warriors round 1 match of the 2012 NRL season, against the Manly-Warringah Sea Eagles at Eden Park, making his debut at centre and shifting the other debutant Konrad Hurrell to the interchange bench after having originally been named to play off of the bench. In round 6, against the Canberra Raiders at Canberra Stadium, Henry scored his first NRL career try in the Warriors 32–12 loss. On 17 June 2012, Henry had his contract with the Warriors extended for 3 years to the end of the 2015 season. Henry finished his debut year in the NRL playing in all the Warriors 24 matches, scoring 8 tries and kicking 2 goals. Henry was named the New Zealand Rugby League's 2012 Rookie of the Year.

=== 2013 ===
Henry's 2013 NRL season was cut short to 7 matches after he suffered a ruptured anterior cruciate ligament (ACL) knee injury at training. Henry scored 3 tries and kicked a goal before the injury.

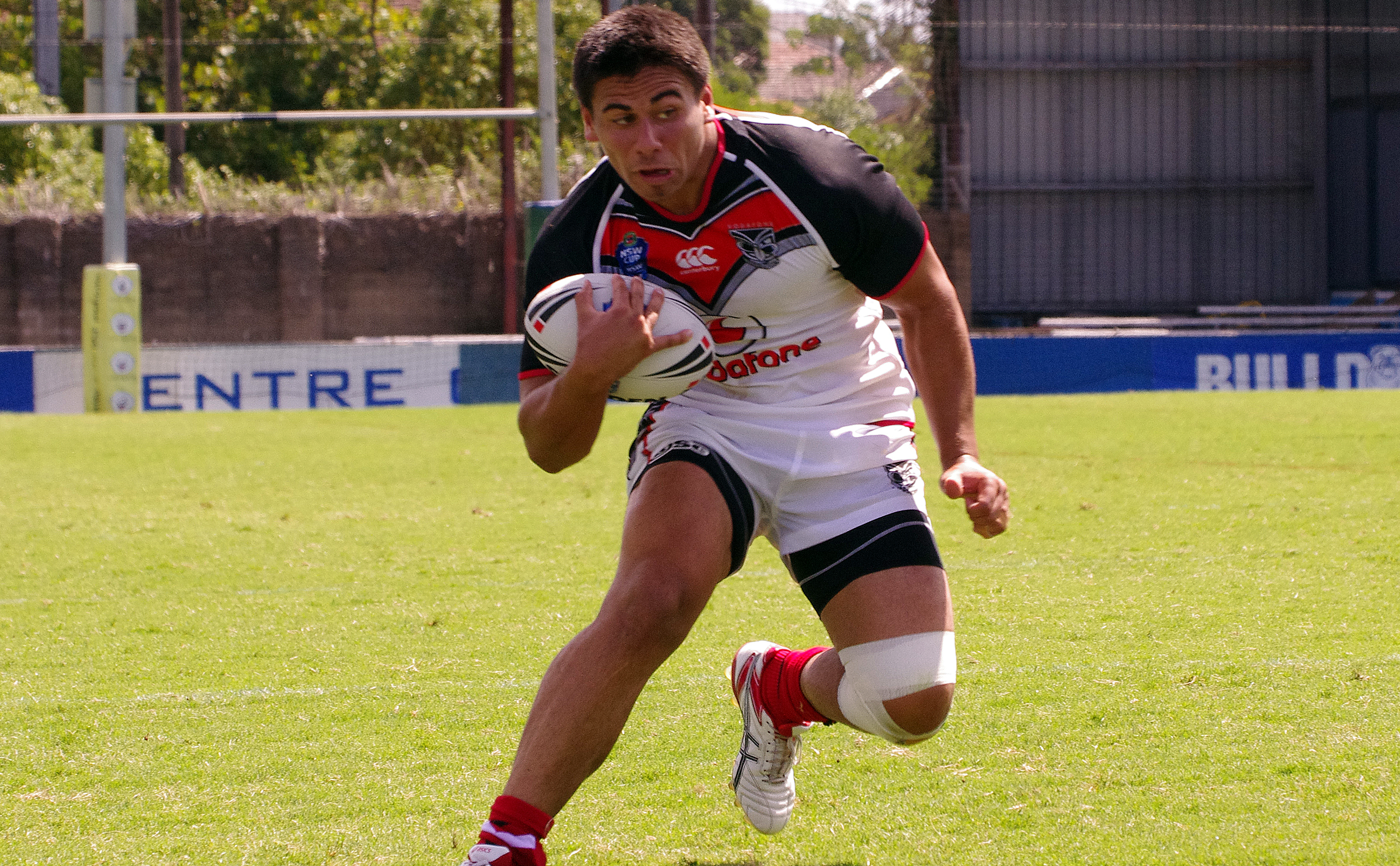
Henry playing for the Warriors in 2014

=== 2014 ===
After playing in 3 matches after round 8 due to a knee injury, Henry was one of the shock debutant selections for Stephen Kearney’s New Zealand national rugby league team squad to play against the Australian Kangaroos in the 2014 ANZAC Test at the SFS. He was selected at hooker due to injuries to Issac Luke and Thomas Leuluai. Henry finished off the 2014 NRL season, playing in 16 matches and scoring 6 tries.

=== 2015 ===
On 31 January and 1 February, Henry played for the Warriors in the 2015 NRL Auckland Nines. He played his 50th NRL match in round three before his season was ended in round four when he tore his ACL, the same injury he suffered in 2013. In the 2015 season he played in 4 matches for the Warriors kicking 1 field goal

=== 2016 ===
In round 1 against the Wests Tigers, Henry re-injured his knee in his return match from injury, his first game since round 4 of the 2015 NRL season. On 2 August 2016, Henry announced that he would retire at the end of the season, due to his constant knee injuries.

At the end of the season he won a NRL-RLPA Pasifika leadership and excellence award, which included travel to the University of California, Los Angeles (UCLA) to attend lectures.

=== 2018 ===
In 2018 he returned to the playing field for the Bay Roskill Vikings in the Sharman Cup helping the team to a 15–0 regular season record where they won the Phelan Shield.
