= 2000 Women's Rugby League World Cup =

First staging of the Women's Rugby League World Cup

2000 Women's World Cup
- Number of teams: 3
- Host country: United Kingdom
- Winner: New Zealand (1st title)
- Runner-up: Great Britain
- Matches played: 6
- Top scorer: (New Zealand) Trish Hina 24 (T:2 G:8)
- Top try scorer: (New Zealand) Selena Te Amo 5

The 2000 Women's Rugby League World Cup – or Women's World Series – was the first staging of the Women's Rugby League World Cup. The tournament was held in England from early November, culminating in the final between Great Britain and New Zealand on 24 November at Wilderspool Stadium, Warrington. Three teams took part, with Australia missing the final.

In July 2000, when the tournament was officially launched, it was planned to be a four-team event with the New Zealand Māori team also taking part.

== Teams ==
| Team | Appearance | Nickname | Coach | Captain |
|---|---|---|---|---|
| Australia | 1st | The Jillaroos | Wayne Portlock | Karyn Murphy and Tarsha Gale |
| (United Kingdom) Great Britain & Ireland | 1st | The Lionesses | Jackie Sheldon | Brenda Dobek and Michelle (Shelly) Land |
| New Zealand | 1st | The Kiwi Ferns | Michael Rawiri | Nadene Conlon and Nicole Presland-Tack |

== Pool matches ==
Tuesday, 7 November

| Great Britain & Ireland (United Kingdom) | 12–22 | New Zealand |
|---|---|---|
| Tries: 2 Natalie Gilmour; Shelley Land; Goals: 2 Brenda Dobek 2 | Reports; Result | Tries: 5 Selena Te Amo 2 Leah Witehira; Miriama Niha; Tracy Wrigley; Goals: 1 Trish Hina |

Rugby Ground, Orrell, Greater Manchester
Attendance: 750
Referee: Graham Shaw

Friday, 10 November

| Australia | 6–10 | New Zealand |
|---|---|---|
| Tries: 1 Tahnee Norris; Goals: 1 Karen Shaw | HT 6–0; Video; Result | Tries: 2 Sharlene Johnstone; Rachel White; Goals: 1 Trish Hina |

South Leeds Stadium, England
Attendance: 1,022

Tuesday, 14 November

| Great Britain & Ireland (United Kingdom) | 14–10 | Australia |
|---|---|---|
| Tries: 3 Jane Banks; Natalie Gilmour; Brenda Dobek; Goals: 1 Brenda Dobek | HT: 8–0; Video; Reports | Tries: 2 Caryl Jarrett; Karyn Murphy; Goals: 1 Karen Shaw |

Rams Stadium, Dewsbury
Attendance: 812
Referee: Ben Thaler

== Play-off matches ==
18 November

| Australia | 6–50 | New Zealand |
|---|---|---|
| Tries: 1 Katrina Fanning; Goals: 1 Karen Shaw | HT: 6–24; NZ Scorers; Report | Tries: 10; Laura Mariu 2 Stacey O'Carroll 2 Nicole Presland; Kat Howard; Michelle Driscoll; Selena Te Amo; Vicki Logopati; Rachel White; Goals: 4 Trish Hina 4 |

Rams Stadium, Dewsbury
Attendance: 796
Referee: Leanne Mallard

21 November

| Great Britain & Ireland (United Kingdom) | 4–0 | Australia |
|---|---|---|
| Goals: 2 Brenda Dobek 2 | Report |

The Jungle, Castleford
Attendance: 1,044
Referee: Grant Maxwell
Player of the Match: Brenda Dobek

== Final ==
24 Nov 2000

| Great Britain & Ireland (United Kingdom) | 4 – 26 | New Zealand |
|---|---|---|
| Tries: 1 Shelley Land | Video; Report; Scorers | Tries: 5 Trish Hina 2 Selena Te Amo 2 Nicole Presland-Tack; Goals: Trish Hina 2 Laura Mariu |

Wilderspool Stadium, Warrington
Attendance: 1,262
Referee: Graham Shaw
