= New Zealand women's national rugby league team =

Team information
- Nickname: Kiwi Ferns
- Governing body: New Zealand Rugby League
- Region: Oceania
- Head coach: Ricky Henry
- Captain: Georgia Hale & Raecene McGregor
- IRL ranking: 2 (20 August 2026)

Uniforms
First colours

Team results
- First international
- New Zealand 18 – 14 Australia (Sydney, Australia, 1 July 1995)
- Biggest win
- New Zealand 92 – 0 France (Christchurch, New Zealand; 25 October 2026)
- Biggest defeat
- New Zealand 4 – 54 Australia (Manchester, England; 19 November 2022)
- World Cup
- Appearances: 6 (first time in 2000)
- Best result: Champions (2000, 2003, 2008)

The New Zealand women's national rugby league team, also known as the Kiwi Ferns or New Zealand Kiwi Ferns, represents New Zealand in women's rugby league. They are administered by the New Zealand Rugby League.

New Zealand won the Women's Rugby League World Cup in 2000, 2003 and 2008.

== History ==
The Kiwi Ferns were formed in 1995.

Touring Australia in June and July 1995, the team won all seven games that they played. Two of the games were full internationals against Australia.

The First Test Match was held on 1 July 1995 at Lidcombe Oval in Sydney. New Zealand 18 defeated Australia 14. The Second Test was held on 8 July 1995 at Hawker Oval in Canberra. New Zealand 14 defeated Australia 6.

In 1997, New Zealand hosted Australia for two Test matches, winning both.

New Zealand hosted a 1998 tour by Great Britain, winning all three matches by comfortable margins, the score of 28 to 6 in the First Test being the closest.

During a Trans-Tasman series in 1999, New Zealand experienced their first defeat, a narrow 20-22 loss in the Second Test at Penrith. New Zealand won the third Test in Auckland to claim the series two-one.

New Zealand competed in the 2000 World Cup, beating Australia and Great Britain twice each to claim the inaugural title.

New Zealand remained undefeated in the 2000s until a one-off Test Match against Australia in 2009. During this period, the Kiwi Ferns won one-off matches in 2001 and 2002, all six matches in the 2003 World Cup to claim their second title, two matches in 2004, another in 2006, and all five matches in the 2008 World Cup to claim their third title as World Cup champions. The winning streak extended to 21 matches.

== Coaches ==
Also see Category:New Zealand women's national rugby league team coaches.

The current coach of the New Zealand team is Ricky Henry, who replaced Justin Morgan in 2020. Morgan had been the coach since 2018.

Name	Tests						Nines						Ref.
Name	Span	Matches	W	D	L	W%	Span	Matches	W	D	L	W%	Ref.
Janie Thompson	1995–1997	4	4	0	0	100.00	N/A						
Tony Lajpold	1998–1999	6	5	0	1	83.33	N/A						
Michael Rawiri	2000–2001	5	5	0	0	100.00	N/A						
Lawrence Brydon	2002–2004	9	9	0	0	100.00	N/A						
Stan Martin	2006–2009	7	6	0	1	85.71	N/A						
Lynley Tierney-Mani	2010–2013	6	5	0	1	83.33	N/A						
Rusty Matua	2014	1	1	0	0	100.00	2015	3	2	0	1	66.67	
Alan Jackson	2015–2016	2	1	0	1	50.00	2016–2017	6	2	0	4	33.33	
Tony Benson	2017	7	5	0	2	71.43	N/A						
Kelvin Wright	2018	1	0	0	1	0.00	N/A						
Justin Morgan	2019	2	1	0	1	50.00	2019	4	3	0	1	75.00	
Ricky Henry	2020–	21	13	0	8	61.90	N/A						

Note:

- Last updated: 16 November 2026

== Players ==
=== Current squad ===
The Kiwi Ferns squad for the 2026 Rugby League World Cup was announced on 6 October 2026.

Jersey numbers in the table reflect selections for the Final against Australia.

Players' ages are as at the date that the table was last updated, 15 November 2026.

J#	Player	Age	Position(s)	Kiwi Ferns						NRLW							Other Reps
J#	Player	Age	Position(s)	Dbt	M	T	G	F	Pts	2026 Club	CM	TM	T	G	F	Pts	Other Reps
1	Apii Nicholls	33	Fullback	2017	24	9	7	0	50	Warriors	0	46	3	13	0	38	—
2	Leianne Tufuga	24	Wing, Centre	2023	11	6	0	0	24	Raiders	24	52	15	0	0	60	1 2
3	Mele Hufanga	32	Centre	2022	17	11	0	0	44	Warriors	0	40	29	0	0	116	—
4	Stacey Waaka	31	Centre, Wing	2026	5	9	0	0	36	Warriors	0	16	15	0	0	60	—
5	Mackenzie Wiki	25	Wing, Centre	2024	5	9	0	0	36	Raiders	36	36	17	0	0	68	3
6	Chantay Kiria-Ratu	22	Five-eighth, Halfback	2026	3	1	12	0	28	Sharks	22	33	5	31	1	83	4 3
7	Raecene McGregor	29	Halfback	2017	23	12	5	0	58	Tigers	12	60	5	78	1	177	6
8	Alexis Tauaneai	21	Prop, Lock	2024	11	1	0	0	4	Bulldogs	19	35	8	0	0	32	—
9	Georgia Hale	31	Hooker, Lock	2015	29	0	0	0	0	Titans	53	62	3	0	0	12	—
10	Otesa Pule	23	Prop, Second-row	2022	17	2	0	0	8	Roosters	53	53	11	0	0	44	3
11	Shaniece Monschau	24	Second-row, Prop	2025	6	0	0	0	0	Tigers	12	23	2	0	0	8	—
12	Kaiyah Atai	25	Second-row, Lock	2026	5	3	0	0	12	Warriors	0	19	2	0	0	8	4
13	Angelina Teakaraanga-Katoa	24	Lock, Second-row	2023	14	1	0	0	4	Bulldogs	21	40	2	0	0	8	—
14	Ashleigh Quinlan	31	Five-eighth, Halfback	2023	13	2	0	0	8	Bulldogs	19	42	7	0	0	28	4 1
15	Annessa Biddle	24	Second-row, Centre	2023	12	3	0	0	12	Sharks	32	32	6	0	0	24	2
16	Shannon Mato	28	Prop	2026	4	1	0	0	4	Broncos	18	45	4	0	0	16	9 8 5
17	Ivana Lauitiiti	20	Prop	2025	8	0	0	0	0	Warriors	0	13	4	0	0	16	—
18	Brooke Anderson	30	Lock, Hooker	2023	11	0	0	0	0	Dragons	0	48	5	0	0	20	1 2 2
19	Zahara Temara	29	Five-eighth, Halfback	2026	2	0	7	0	14	Raiders	41	65	7	135	4	302	5 8 1 6 1
20	Brianna Clark	31	Prop	2022	10	1	7	0	18	Broncos	43	49	4	16	0	48	2 1
21	Abigail Roache	30	Centre, Five-eighth	2022	13	5	0	0	20	Cowboys	18	38	12	0	0	48	—
22	Tenika Willison	28	Wing, Centre	2026	1	2	0	0	8	Knights	31	31	10	0	0	40	1
–	Trinity Tauaneai	19	Lock, Prop	2026	1	0	0	0	0	Dragons	0	19	1	0	0	4	—
IJ	Shanice Parker	28	Wing, Centre	2022	11	3	0	0	12	Knights	53	58	15	0	0	60	1 1 5 2

Notes

- All 23 players played in the 2026 NRL Women's season.
- Three members of the squad have previously played for another nation:
  - Australia (2): Mato and Temara.
  - Cook Islands (1): Chantay Kiria-Ratu
  - Samoa (1): Tufuga
- Twelve squad members have previously played for Australasian based representative teams:
  - Māori All Stars (8): Anderson, Biddle, Mato, McGregor, Parker, Quinlan, and Temara.
  - New South Wales (2): Anderson and Parker
  - Queensland (5): Clark, Chantay Kiria-Ratu, Mato, Pule, and Temara.
  - NSW City (3): Anderson, Parker, Quinlan, and Tufuga.
  - NRL All Stars (2): Parker and Temara.

== Competitive record ==
=== Head to head records ===
Opponent	FM	MR	M	W	D	L	Win%	PF	PA	Share
Australia	1995	2026	33	17	0	16	51.52%	626	557	52.92%
Great Britain	1998	2003	6	6	0	0	100.00%	196	24	89.09%
New Zealand Māori	2002	2017	4	4	0	0	100.00%	176	34	83.81%
Cook Islands	2003	2022	3	3	0	0	100.00%	178	4	97.80%
Tokelau	2003	2003	1	1	0	0	100.00%	84	0	100.00%
Samoa	2003	2026	6	6	0	0	100.00%	238	40	85.61%
Pacific Islands	2008	2008	1	1	0	0	100.00%	72	0	100.00%
Tonga	2008	2023	3	3	0	0	100.00%	120	26	82.19%
England	2008	2022	6	6	0	0	100.00%	204	42	82.93%
France	2013	2026	3	3	0	0	100.00%	226	0	100.00%
Canada	2017	2017	1	1	0	0	100.00%	50	4	92.59%
Papua New Guinea	2017	2026	3	3	0	0	100.00%	114	12	90.48%
Totals	1995	2026	70	54	0	16	77.14%	2,284	743	75.45%

Notes:

- Table last updated 15 November 2026 (after the World Cup Final).
- Share is the portion of "For" points compared to the sum of "For" and "Against" points.

=== Results ===
==== Full internationals ====
Date	Opponent	Score	Tournament	Venue	Video	Report(s)
1 Jul 1995	Australia	18–14	2 Test Series	Lidcombe Oval, Sydney	—	
8 Jul 1995	Australia	14–6	2 Test Series	Hawker Oval, Canberra	—	
20 Sep 1997	Australia	34–26	2 Test Series	Petone Recreation Ground, Wellington	—	
24 Sep 1997	Australia	40–16	2 Test Series	Carlaw Park, Auckland	—	
23 Aug 1998	Great Britain	28–6	3 Test Series	Puketawhero Park, Rotorua	—	
29 Aug 1998	Great Britain	44–0	3 Test Series	Rugby League Park, Christchurch	—	
4 Sep 1998	Great Britain	38–2	3 Test Series	Carlaw Park, Auckland	—	
23 Sep 1999	Australia	20–10	3 Test Series	Leichhardt Oval, Sydney	—	
27 Sep 1999	Australia	20–22	3 Test Series	Penrith Stadium, Sydney		
29 Oct 1999	Australia	26–14	3 Test Series	Ericsson Stadium, Auckland	—	
7 Nov 2000	Great Britain	22–12	2000 Women's Rugby League World Cup	Rugby Ground, Orrell, Greater Manchester	—	
10 Nov 2000	Australia	10–6	2000 Women's Rugby League World Cup	South Leeds Stadium		
18 Nov 2000	Australia	50–6	2000 Women's Rugby League World Cup	Rams Stadium, Dewsbury	—	
24 Nov 2000	Great Britain	26–4	2000 Women's Rugby League World Cup	Wilderspool, Warrington		
23 Sep 2001	Australia	42–8	Test Match	Carlaw Park, Auckland	—	
Oct 2002	(Māori people) Māori	36–10	Test Match	New Zealand	—	
28 Sep 2003	Cook Islands	68–0	2003 Women's Rugby League World Cup	North Harbour Stadium	—	
2 Oct 2003	Tokelau	84–0	2003 Women's Rugby League World Cup	Marist Rugby Grounds	—	
4 Oct 2003	Australia	44–4	2003 Women's Rugby League World Cup	North Harbour Stadium	—	
6 Oct 2003	Samoa	84–0	2003 Women's Rugby League World Cup	North Harbour Stadium	—	
8 Oct 2003	Great Britain	38–0	2003 Women's Rugby League World Cup	North Harbour Stadium	—	
12 Oct 2003	(Māori people) Māori	58–0	2003 Women's Rugby League World Cup	North Harbour Stadium	—	
14 Aug 2004	Australia	38–12	2 Test Series	Bendigo Bank Oval, Ipswich	—	
21 Aug 2004	Australia	30–20	2 Test Series	Davies Park, Brisbane		
1 Jul 2006	(Māori people) Māori	50–12	Test Match	Rotorua International Stadium	—	
6 Nov 2008	Pacific Islands	72–0	2008 Women's Rugby League World Cup	Stockland Park, Sunshine Coast		
8 Nov 2008	Tonga	42–4	2008 Women's Rugby League World Cup	Stockland Park, Sunshine Coast		
10 Nov 2008	Samoa	26–4	2008 Women's Rugby League World Cup	Stockland Park, Sunshine Coast		
12 Nov 2008	England	16–4	2008 Women's Rugby League World Cup	Stockland Park, Sunshine Coast		
15 Nov 2008	Australia	34–0	2008 Women's Rugby League World Cup	Suncorp Stadium, Brisbane		
23 Sep 2009	Australia	16–18	Test Match	Ellerslie Domain, Auckland	—	
10 Oct 2010	England	44–6	2 Test Series	Toll Stadium, Whangārei	—	
16 Oct 2010	England	38–6	2 Test Series	Waitakere Stadium, Auckland	—	
5 Jul 2013	France	88–0	2013 Women's Rugby League World Cup	The Tetley's Stadium, Dewsbury		
8 Jul 2013	England	34–16	2013 Women's Rugby League World Cup	Post Office Road, Featherstone		
11 Jul 2013	Australia	14–6	2013 Women's Rugby League World Cup	Fox's Biscuits Stadium, Batley		
14 Jul 2013	Australia	12–22	2013 Women's Rugby League World Cup	Headingley, Leeds		
9 Nov 2014	Australia	12–8	Test Match	WIN Stadium, Wollongong		
3 May 2015	Australia	14–22	Anzac Test	Suncorp Stadium, Brisbane	—	
6 May 2016	Australia	26–16	Anzac Test	Hunter Stadium, Newcastle	—	
5 May 2017	Australia	4–16	Anzac Test	GIO Stadium, Canberra		
4 Nov 2017	(Māori people) Māori	32–12	Warm-up Match	Waikato Stadium, Hamilton	—	
16 Nov 2017	Canada	50–4	2017 Women's Rugby League World Cup	Southern Cross Group Stadium, Sydney		
19 Nov 2017	Cook Islands	76–0	2017 Women's Rugby League World Cup	Southern Cross Group Stadium, Sydney		
22 Nov 2017	Papua New Guinea	38–0	2017 Women's Rugby League World Cup	Southern Cross Group Stadium, Sydney		
26 Nov 2017	England	52–4	2017 Women's Rugby League World Cup	Southern Cross Group Stadium, Sydney		
2 Dec 2017	Australia	16–23	2017 Women's Rugby League World Cup	Suncorp Stadium, Brisbane		
13 Oct 2018	Australia	24–26	Test Match	Mount Smart Stadium, Auckland		
22 Jun 2019	Samoa	46–8	Test Match	Mount Smart Stadium, Auckland		
25 Oct 2019	Australia	8–28	Test Match	WIN Stadium, Wollongong		
7 Nov 2020	Samoa	28–8	Test Match	Mount Smart Stadium, Auckland		
25 Jun 2022	Tonga	50–12	Test Match	Mount Smart Stadium, Auckland		
2 Nov 2022	France	46–0	2021 Women's Rugby League World Cup	York Community Stadium, York		
6 Nov 2022	Cook Islands	34–4	2021 Women's Rugby League World Cup	York Community Stadium, York		
10 Nov 2022	Australia	8–10	2021 Women's Rugby League World Cup	York Community Stadium, York		
14 Nov 2022	England	20–6	2021 Women's Rugby League World Cup	York Community Stadium, York		
19 Nov 2022	Australia	4–54	2021 Women's Rugby League World Cup	Old Trafford, Manchester		
14 Oct 2023	Australia	10–16	Test Match	Qld Country Bank Stadium		
21 Oct 2023	Tonga	28–10	Test Match	Eden Park, Auckland		
28 Oct 2023	Australia	12–6	Test Match	AAMI Park, Melbourne	—	
27 Oct 2024	Australia	0–14	2024 Pacific Championship	Apollo Projects Stadium, Christchurch		
3 Nov 2024	Papua New Guinea	36–0	2024 Pacific Championship	Santos National Football Stadium, Port Moresby		
10 Nov 2024	Australia	4–24	2024 Pacific Championship	CommBank Stadium, Parramatta		
19 Oct 2025	Samoa	22–20	2025 Pacific Championship	Go Media Stadium, Auckland		
2 Nov 2025	Australia	4–10	2025 Pacific Championship	Eden Park, Auckland		
9 Nov 2025	Australia	8–40	2025 Pacific Championship	CommBank Stadium, Sydney		
18 Oct 2026	Fiji	18–12	2026 Women's Rugby League World Cup	McDonald Jones Stadium, Newcastle		
25 Oct 2026	France	92–0	2026 Women's Rugby League World Cup	One NZ Stadium, Christchurch		
31 Oct 2026	Papua New Guinea	40–12	2026 Women's Rugby League World Cup	Cbus Super Stadium, Gold Coast		
7 Nov 2026	Samoa	32–0	2026 Women's Rugby League World Cup	McDonald Jones Stadium, Newcastle		
15 Nov 2026	Australia	10–34	2026 Women's Rugby League World Cup	Suncorp Stadium, Brisbane		

==== Nines ====
Date	Opponent	Score	Tournament	Venue	Video	Report(s)
31 Jan 2015	Australia	8–4	2015 Auckland Nines	Eden Park, Auckland	—	
1 Feb 2015	Australia	16–4	2015 Auckland Nines	Eden Park, Auckland	—	
1 Feb 2015	Australia	7–8	2015 Auckland Nines	Eden Park, Auckland		
6 Feb 2016	Australia	4–11	2016 Auckland Nines	Eden Park, Auckland		
7 Feb 2016	Australia	9–0	2016 Auckland Nines	Eden Park, Auckland		
7 Feb 2016	Australia	21–7	2016 Auckland Nines	Eden Park, Auckland		
4 Feb 2017	Australia	4–20	2017 Auckland Nines	Eden Park, Auckland		
5 Feb 2017	Australia	0–8	2017 Auckland Nines	Eden Park, Auckland		
5 Feb 2017	Australia	4–14	2017 Auckland Nines	Eden Park, Auckland	—	
18 Oct 2019	Australia	8–22	2019 World Cup 9s	Bankwest Stadium, Sydney		
19 Oct 2019	Papua New Guinea	24–12	2019 World Cup 9s	Bankwest Stadium, Sydney		
19 Oct 2019	England	33–4	2019 World Cup 9s	Bankwest Stadium, Sydney		
19 Oct 2019	Australia	17–15	2019 World Cup 9s	Bankwest Stadium, Sydney		

== Records ==
=== Individual records ===
This section last updated 17 November 2024.

The tally of tries, goals and points for this section is missing

- All of the 16 points vs Australia on 23 September 2009.
- 4 of 44 points vs England on 10 October 2010 (First Test). A long report in the New Zealand Herald mentions the scorers of the ten tries but omits the goal-kicker.

Points scored: 246

- Trish Hina (33 tries, 57 goals)

Tries scored: 45

- Honey Hireme

Goals kicked: 57

- Trish Hina

Points scored in a match: 40

- Trish Hina (5 tries, 10 goals) vs Samoa, World Cup, 6 October 2003.

Tries scored in a match: 6

- Fuarosa Time vs Tokelau, World Cup, 2 October 2003.
- Honey Hireme vs Cook Islands, World Cup, 19 November 2017.

Goals kicked in a match: 10

- Trish Hina vs Samoa, World Cup, 6 October 2003.
- Laura Mariu vs Pacific Islands, World Cup 6 November 2008.

Notes:

- Most Games is not listed above as full line-ups are not known to contributors for multiple matches prior to 2011.
  - Unknown: 1997 (both Tests), 1998 (2nd Test), 1999 (1st Test), 2002 (only match), 2003 (all six World Cup matches), 2004 (1st Test), 2006 (only match), 2009 (only Test), 2010 (1st Test).
  - Known: 1995 (both Tests), 1998 (1st & 3rd Tests), 1999 (2nd & 3rd Tests), 2000 (all four World Cup matches), 2001 (only Test), 2004 (2nd Test), 2008 (all five World Cup matches), 2010 (2nd Test).
- For the 2nd Test of 1999, the try-scorers listed in the New Zealand Rugby League Annual 1999 differs from the try-scorers shown in the match video on YouTube. The Annual has the try-scorers as Nadene Conlon, Zavana Aranga, Rachel White, and Leah Witehira. The video shows the New Zealand try scorers as Nadene Conlon (video 0:10:31), Rachel White (0:47:46), Miriama Niha (1:02:21), and Michelle Driscoll (1:15:46).
- Try-scorers for the 1st Test of 1999 are listed in the Annual as Trish Hina (2), Leah Witehira, and Tasha Davie. A one paragraph report in The Press mentions two second-half try scorers for New Zealand in this match as Leah Witehira and Tasha Davie.

=== Team records ===
==== Margins and streaks ====
Biggest winning margins

Margin	Score	Opponent	Venue	Date
92	92–0	France	One NZ Stadium	25 Oct 2026
88	88–0	France	Tetleys Stadium	5 Jul 2013
84	84–0	Samoa	North Harbour Stadium	6 Oct 2003
76	76–0	Cook Islands	Southern Cross Group Stadium	19 Nov 2017
68	68–0	Cook Islands	North Harbour Stadium	28 Sep 2003
48	52–4	England	Southern Cross Group Stadium	26 Nov 2017
46	50–4	Canada	Southern Cross Group Stadium	16 Nov 2017
46	46–0	France	LNER Community Stadium	2 Nov 2022
44	50–6	Australia	Jungle	18 Nov 2000
40	44–4	Australia	North Harbour Stadium	4 Oct 2003
38	38–0	Papua New Guinea	Southern Cross Group Stadium	22 Nov 2017
38	46–8	Samoa	Mount Smart Stadium	22 June 2019
38	44–6	England	Toll Stadium	10 Oct 2010
38	50–12	Tonga	Mount Smart Stadium	25 June 2022
38	42–4	Tonga	Mount Smart Stadium	8 Nov 2008

Biggest losing margins

Margin	Score	Opponent	Venue	Date
50	4–54	Australia	Old Trafford	19 Nov 2022
32	8–40	Australia	CommBank Stadium	9 Nov 2025
20	8–28	Australia	WIN Stadium	25 Oct 2019
20	4–24	Australia	CommBank Stadium	10 Nov 2024
14	0–14	Australia	Apollo Projects Stadium	27 Oct 2024
12	4–16	Australia	GIO Stadium	5 May 2017
10	12–22	Australia	Headingley Stadium	14 July 2013

Most consecutive wins

Matches	First win	Last win	Days	Ended	Days
21	29 Oct 1999	15 Nov 2008	9 years, 18 days	23 Sep 2009	9 years, 330 days
8	1 Jul 1995	23 Sep 1999	4 years, 84 days	27 Sep 1999	4 years, 88 days

Most consecutive losses

Matches	First loss	Last loss	Days	Ended	Days
2	2 Dec 2017	13 Oct 2018	315 days	22 Jun 2019	1 year, 202 days
2	19 Nov 2022	14 Oct 2023	329 days	21 Oct 2023	336 days
2	2 Nov 2025	9 Nov 2025	7 days	Current	1 year, 15 days

== Individual awards ==
=== Player of the Year ===
A female Player of the Year award is included in the New Zealand Rugby League Awards.

Year	Player	Kiwi Ferns Matches in Year		Provincial Team	NZ Club	NRLW Club	Ref
Year	Player	13's	9's	Provincial Team	NZ Club	NRLW Club	Ref
1997	Trish Hina	2	—	Wellington	Te Aroha Eels	—	
1998	Luisa Avaiki	2	—	Auckland	Richmond Rovers	—	
1999	Trish Hina	4	—	Wellington	Te Aroha Eels	—	
2000	Trish Hina	4	—	Wellington	Te Aroha Eels	—	
2004	Lorina Papali'i	2	—	Auckland	Richmond Rovers	—	
2005	Rona Peters	—	—	Auckland		—	
2006	Rona Peters	1	—	Auckland		—	
2007	Honey Hireme	0	—		Papakura Sea Eagles	—	
2008	Maia Tua-Davidson	4	—	Hawke's Bay		—	
2009	Tasha Tapu	?	—			—	
2010	Sarina Fiso	2	—	Auckland	Papakura Sea Eagles	—	
2011	Akenehe Pereira	0	—	Wellington		—	
2012	Honey Hireme	0	—	Waikato		—	
2013	Sarina Fiso	4	—	Counties Manukau	Manurewa Marlins	—	
2014	Atawhai Tupaea	1	—	Counties Manukau	Papakura Sea Eagles	—	
2015	Teuila Fotu-Moala	1	Yes	Counties Manukau	Otahuhu Leopards	—	
2016	Sarina Fiso	1	Yes	Counties Manakau	Manurewa Marlins	—	
2017	Apii Nicholls-Pualau	5	No	Counties Manakau	Manurewa Marlins	—	
2018	Honey Hireme	1	—			Dragons	
2019	Georgia Hale	2	4	Auckland	Richmond Rovers	Warriors	
2020	Krystal Rota	1	—	Counties Manakau		—	
2021	Not awarded						
2022	Raecene McGregor	6	—	—	—	Roosters	
2023	Raecene McGregor	3	—	—	—	Dragons	
2024	Annessa Biddle	3	—	—	—	Sharks	
2025	Mele Hufanga	3	—	—	—	Broncos	

=== Rookie of the Year ===
A female Rookie of the Year award has been included in the New Zealand Rugby League Awards since 2018.

Year	Player	Kiwi Ferns Matches in Year		Provincial Team	NZ Club	NRLW Club	Ref
Year	Player	13's	9's	Provincial Team	NZ Club	NRLW Club	Ref
2018	Onjeurlina Leiataua	1	—	Counties Manukau		Warriors	
2019	Jules Newman	1	4	Auckland	Mount Albert Lions	Warriors	
2020	Autumn-Rain Stephens-Daly	1	—	Upper Central		—	
2021	Not awarded						
2022	Brianna Clark	5	—			Broncos	
2023	Annessa Biddle	3	—		Otara Scorpions	Sharks	
2024	Alexis Tauaneai	3	—	—	—	Dragons	
2025	Ivana Lauitiiti	3	—	—	—	Warriors	

=== Hall of Legends ===
On 12 November 2026, the IRL announced the inaugural induction of 42 players into the International Rugby League Hall of Legends. Six women were amongst the initial inductees, including three Kiwi Ferns.

Player	National Team		State Team	Clubs	Ref
Player	Matches	Years	State Team	Clubs	Ref
Luisa Avaiki	25	1995, 1997, 1998, 1999, 2000, 2001, 2002, 2003, 2004, 2008	Auckland	Richmond Roses	
Trish Hina	22	1997, 1998, 1999, 2000, 2001, 2002, 2003, 2004, 2006, 2008, 2010	Wellington	Te Aroha Eels (Wellington)	
Honey Hireme-Smiler	32	2002, 2003, 2008, 2010, 2013, 2014, 2017, 2018, 2019, 2020	Bay of Plenty, Waikato	Forestland Falcons, Papakura Sisters, St. George Illawarra Dragons, Hamilton City Tigers	

Note: The lists of clubs in the above table is incomplete.

=== Golden Boot Award ===
A Golden Boot Award for the women's international rugby league player of the year was first awarded in 2018. The award was not presented in 2020 or 2021 due to the COVID-19 pandemic. As of 2026, the award has been won by Kiwi Ferns players three out of seven times.

Winners
Year	Player	NRLW Club	Position(s)	Ref
2022	Raecene McGregor	Sydney Roosters	Halfback	
2023	Georgia Hale	Gold Coast Titans	Lock	
2026	Stacey Waaka	New Zealand Warriors	Centre, Wing	

Nominees
Year	Period		Nominees		Player	Ref
Year	Start	End	NZ	Total	Player	Ref
2018	2 Dec 2017	4 Nov 2018	1	4	Honey Hireme	
2019		16 Nov 2019	0	4	—	
2022		13 Nov 2022			Raecene McGregor	
2023		19 Nov 2022	4	14	Georgia Hale; Mele Hufanga; Raecene McGregor; Apii Nicholls	
2024		8 Nov 2024	4	25	Annessa Biddle; Gayle Broughton; Georgia Hale; Amber Hall	
2025		7 Nov 2025	5	22	Annessa Biddle; Apii Nicholls; Ashleigh Quinlan; Georgia Hale; Raecene McGregor	
2026		8 Nov 2026	3	8	Raecene McGregor; Apii Nicholls; Stacey Waaka	

== IRL Rankings ==
IRL Women's World Rankings
Official rankings as of August 2026
Rank	Change	Team	Pts %
1	Steady	Australia	100
2	Steady	New Zealand	64
3	Steady	England	40
4	Steady	France	25
5	Steady	Samoa	22
6	Steady	Papua New Guinea	19
7	▲6	Canada	19
8	Steady	Ireland	18
9	▼2	Wales	17
10	Steady	Nigeria	16
11	▼2	Cook Islands	15
12	Steady	Fiji	13
13	▲2	Tonga	12
14	▲2	United States	12
15	▼4	Greece	11
16	▼2	Netherlands	10
17	▲3	Scotland	8
18	▼1	Serbia	4
19	▼1	Kenya	4
20	▼1	Ghana	4
21	▲2	Brazil	3
22	▲2	Jamaica	3
23	▼2	Italy	2
24	▼2	Philippines	2
25	▲1	Lebanon	2
26	▼1	Uganda	1
27	Steady	Malta	1
28	Steady	Turkey	1
Complete rankings at www.internationalrugbyleague.com

== Past squads ==
=== 1990s ===
The Kiwi Ferns were formed in 1995.

1995 Inaugural Kiwi Ferns Team

- Juanita Hall (C)
- Zavana Aranga
- Maria Auega
- Luisa Avaiki
- Golly Baker
- Nadene Conlon
- Wendy Cunningham
- Michelle Driscoll
- Eva Epiha
- Sharlene Hannah
- Kaylene Ihaia
- Therese Mangos
- Tania Martin
- Nicole Presland
- Eileen Rankin (VC)
- Debbie Syme
- Megan Tahapeehi
- Lynley Tierney
- Laura Waretini
- Rachel White
- Sara White
- Tammi Wilson
- Leah Witehira
- Coach: Janie Thompson
- Managers: Diana Hay and Ollie Karu and Yvonne Hiko and Maia Le Cheminant
- Masseur: Josie O'Dwyer

Touring Australia in June and July 1995, the team won all seven games that they played. Two of the games were full internationals against Australia.

The First Test Match was held on 1 July 1995 at Lidcombe Oval in Sydney. New Zealand 18 (Maira Auega, Leah Witehira, Debbie Syme, Luisa Avaiki tries; Zavana Aranga goal) defeated Australia 14 (Natalie Dwyer, Julie McGuffie, Sherrilee Moulds tries; Sherrilee Moulds goal).

The Second Test was held on 8 July 1995 at Hawker Oval in Canberra. New Zealand 14 (Tammi Wilson, Leah Witehira, Laura Waretine tries; Laura Waretine goal) defeated Australia 6 (Katrina Fanning try, Sherrilee Moulds goal).

Other matches on the tour were played against the following teams:

- NSW President's XIII on 27 June at North Sydney Oval. New Zealand won 16–6.
- Sydney at Ringrose Park, Wentworthville. New Zealand 26 defeated Sydney 4.
- Australian Capital Territory on 6 July at Freebody Oval, Queanbeyan. New Zealand 48 defeated A.C.T. nil.
- Queensland at Davies Park, Brisbane. New Zealand 48 defeated Queensland nil.
- Queensland at Seagulls Stadium, Tweed Heads, New South Wales. New Zealand 36 defeated Queensland nil.

1997 Kiwi Ferns Team

- Kaylene Ihaia
- Lemelle Lauaki
- Mate Lefale
- Priscilla Moke
- Luisa Avaiki
- Christine Moir
- Lynley Tierney
- Nadene Conlon (VC)
- Zavana Aranga (C)
- Rachel White
- Tracy Wrigley
- Trish Hina
- Michelle Driscoll
- Megan Tahapeehi
- Nicole Presland
- Mere Miki
- Selena Edmonds
- Coach: Janie Thomson
- Managers: Diane Pakai, Robin Thompson
- Trainer: Eileen Rankin
- NZWRL Secretary: Cherie Steel

New Zealand hosted Australia. New Zealand won both International Test games to remain undefeated for 4 Tests in a row.

1998 Kiwi Ferns Team

- Audrey Thompson
- Zavana Aranga (C)
- Nadene Conlon (VC)
- Tasha Davie
- Debbie Chase
- Alarna Nicholas
- Leah Witehira
- Serena Setu
- Rachel White
- Sara White
- Luisa Avaiki
- Trish Hina
- Somma Te Kahu
- Germaine Wiki
- Jackie Ryder
- Michelle Driscoll
- Rachel Bean
- Coach: Tony Lajpold
- Manager: Hope Weston
- Trainer: Harry Tipene

New Zealand hosted a travelling Great Britain Lionesses team. New Zealand won all 3 test matches to bring their undefeated tally to 7 in a row.

1999 Kiwi Ferns Team

- Tasha Davie
- Tracy Wrigley
- Nadene Conlon
- Leah Witehira
- Stacey O'Carroll
- Jean Kellett
- Mary Brennan
- Frances Te Ao
- Sara White
- Cynthia Ta'ala
- Rachel White
- Selena Te Amo
- Trish Hina
- Luisa Avaiki
- Antoinette Rowley
- Michelle Driscoll
- Jackie Ryder
- Zavana Aranga (C)
- Miriama Niha
- Germaine Wiki
- Coach: Tony Lajpold
- Manager: Christine Cooper
- Trainer: Eileen Porter-Rankin

The three-match series was split between two matches in Sydney and one in Auckland. New Zealand won the First Test Match but lost the Second Test, ending their 8 Test undefeated streak.

=== 2000s ===
2000 World Cup Kiwi Ferns Squad

1. Somma Te Kahu
2. Sharlene Johnson
3. Michelle Driscoll
4. Selena Te Amo
5. Stacey O'Carroll
6. Trish Hina
7. Leah Witehira
8. Nicole Presland (C)
9. Tracy Wrigley
10. Luisa Avaiki
11. Rachel White
12. Nadene Conlon (C)
13. Tasha Davie
14. Laura Mariu
15. Ina Muaiava
16. Frances Te Ao
17. Hanna Wainohu
18. Nola Campbell
19. Miriama Niha
20. Lynley Tierney-Mani
21. Rachel Cooper
22. Priscilla Moke
23. Vicki Logopati
24. Katrina Howard
- Coach: Michael Rawiri
- Trainer: Bob

New Zealand travelled to Great Britain for the Inaugural Women's Rugby League World Cup. New Zealand beat both Great Britain & Ireland and Australia in round matches, and then Australia in a semi-final to play Great Britain & Ireland in the final. New Zealand won the Final 26–4, to win the World Cup.

2003 Kiwi Ferns World Cup Squad

Sharlene Atai (Auckland), Luisa Avaiki (Captain, Auckland), Mere Baker (Canterbury), Elina Beets (Auckland), Tafale Chan Ting (Auckland), Nadene Conlon (Auckland), Sarina Fiso (Auckland), Aimee Gilbert (Wellington), Marion Heather (Auckland), Trish Hina (Wellington), Honey Hireme (Waikato), Annabelle Hohepa (Auckland), Teasha-Lee Leka (Auckland), Bodene Marino (Canterbury), Caroline Marsters, Lorina Papali'i, Rona Peters, Cynthia Ta'ala, Rachel White, Leah Witehira (all Auckland).

=== 2010s ===
2010 Kiwi Ferns Team

The Kiwi Ferns team for the First Test against England was: Sarina Fiso; Sharlene Ata, Trish Hina, Karley Te Korua, Laura Mariu; Rona Peters, Josephine Leef; Sharnita Woodman, Ana Pereira, Cynthia Ta’ala, Honey Hireme, Maryanne Collins. Interchange: Ebony Low, Akehene Pereira, Maryanne Hemara, Kathleen Keremete. There were four changes to the seventeen for the Second Test, with Bridget Smith, Lorina Papali'i, Charmaine McMenamim and Alisha Moses playing in that match.

2014 Kiwi Ferns Team

The Kiwi Ferns beat the Jillaroos 12 - 8 in a curtain-raiser match ahead of the Four Nations match between the Kangaroos and Samoa at the WIN Stadium in Wollongong, Australia.

2015 Kiwi Ferns Team

The 2015 Anzac Test curtain-raiser match between the Ferns and the Jillaroos was initially to be played on 1 May but was postponed due to bad weather. The match commenced on 3 May at the Suncorp Stadium with the Jillaroos winning the match 22 - 14.

== Sources ==
Coverage of the New Zealand Women's Rugby League team in the following sources is intermittent until the mid-2010s. There are multiple instances of a newspaper publishing details in relation to a match or series in one year, but not of matches in following years.

Acronym	Item	Years	Database App	Notes
Direct Online Access
CT	The Canberra Times	1995	Trove	Match Report.
NZRL	New Zealand Rugby League	1995–present	NZRL website	List of results
VH, VR	Video Highlights, Replay	2008–present	YouTube	Match highlights and or full match replays
Indirect Online Access (Note: Access through library eResources to database applications housing newspaper and journal content. This may require library membership. As an example, SLNSW eResources requires a membership number, although membership is free to residents of NSW.)
NZH	The New Zealand Herald	2003–present	ProQuest	Scores and articles for some matches, player profiles.
TPC	The Press	1996–present	ProQuest	Scores and articles for some matches, player profiles.
DP	Dominion Post	2003–present	ProQuest	Scores and articles for some matches, player profiles.
SS	Sunday Star	1998-2001	ProQuest	Scores and articles for some matches
SN	Sunday News	1997–present	ProQuest	Scores and articles for some matches, player profiles
RLW	Rugby League Week	2002-2017	EBSCOhost	Scores and articles for some matches.
Ind	The Independent	2000	ProQuest	Articles on some 2000 World Cup matches
DT	Daily Telegraph	2003-now	Newsbank	Scores and articles for some matches.
SCD	Sunshine Coast Daily	2008	Newsbank	Good coverage of 2008 World Cup
