= Maggie Moloney =

Australian rugby league player

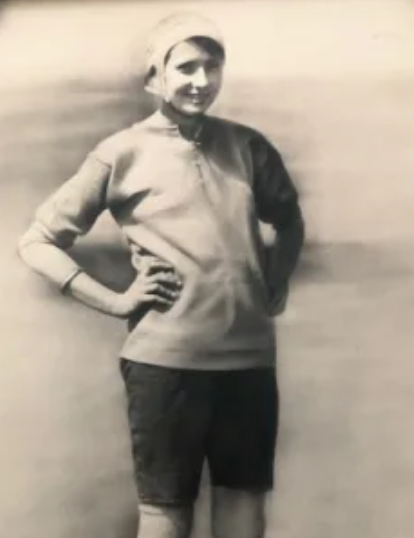
- Known for: First Official Women's Rugby League match

Maggie Moloney was an Australian rugby league player, who was the star of the first official women's rugby league match, held in 1921. A street mural in Redfern, Australia, was painted in 2022 in tribute to her achievements and contribution to sport.

== Early life and career ==
Moloney was, at the age of 15, the first female 'rugby league star', and described as the 'female Dally Messenger'. Moloney's appearance in rugby league was reported upon, as one of the 'largest news stories of 1921'. Her match was reported in many media outlets of the time, including The Sun, The Sunday Times and The Daily Telegraph.

Moloney played in the Sydney Showground, in a crowd which was reported to consist of 20–30,000 people, and scored four tries for the Metropolitan Blues, against the rugby team 'the Sydney Reds'. The score was 21–11, and the match was the world's first public match of women's rugby league.

Moloney's career was short, due to the 'level of administrative skulduggery' which the women's competition faced. Women who wanted to play sports in a similar manner to men, faced certain difficulties. For example, the men's teams were scheduled to play as 'curtain raisers' for the women's match. However, this curtain raiser was prevented by the NSW Rugby League officials. The ban was despite the fact that NSWRL voted to support women's competition.

Despite the ban, the 'greatest rugby league player of the time', Dally Messenger, took the opportunity at half-time, to launch his own rugby league ball during the women's contest. Men were not allowed to watch the women's training, however women could, for a small fee. Police officers guarded the training grounds.

Moloney has been described as a pioneer of women's sport in Australia, and a reminder of how women's sport was less supported in 1921 than at present. Moloney won medals for being the highest scorer, and 'best and fairest'.

== Maggie M medal discussion ==
In 2022, there was discussion around whether to name the best female player (NWRL) after Moloney, being called the 'Maggie M medal' rather than the Dally M medal. As well as plans to rename the medal, there is discussion around salaries. Moloney was described as 'the game's best female NRL player'.

The NRL commented that:

"Maggie Moloney was a pioneer of women's rugby league and her story will always have an indelible place in the history of the game in Australia."

== Redfern wall mural ==
In 2022, a wall on the back of Redfern's St Vincent de Paul Community Support Center is nearby to the land where Moloney practiced, with her brother Bryan, who played for the Rabbitohs. The wall was painted by street artist Sharon Billinge and Rugby League Historian Katherine Haines.

The mural in Redfern was also painted in recognition of the contribution made by the First Nations community. This community was recognised as being pioneers of women's rugby league in Australia.
