= Petone Recreation Ground =

Cricket ground in Lower Hutt, Wellington, New Zealand

Coordinates: 41°13′24.73″S 174°52′57.75″E

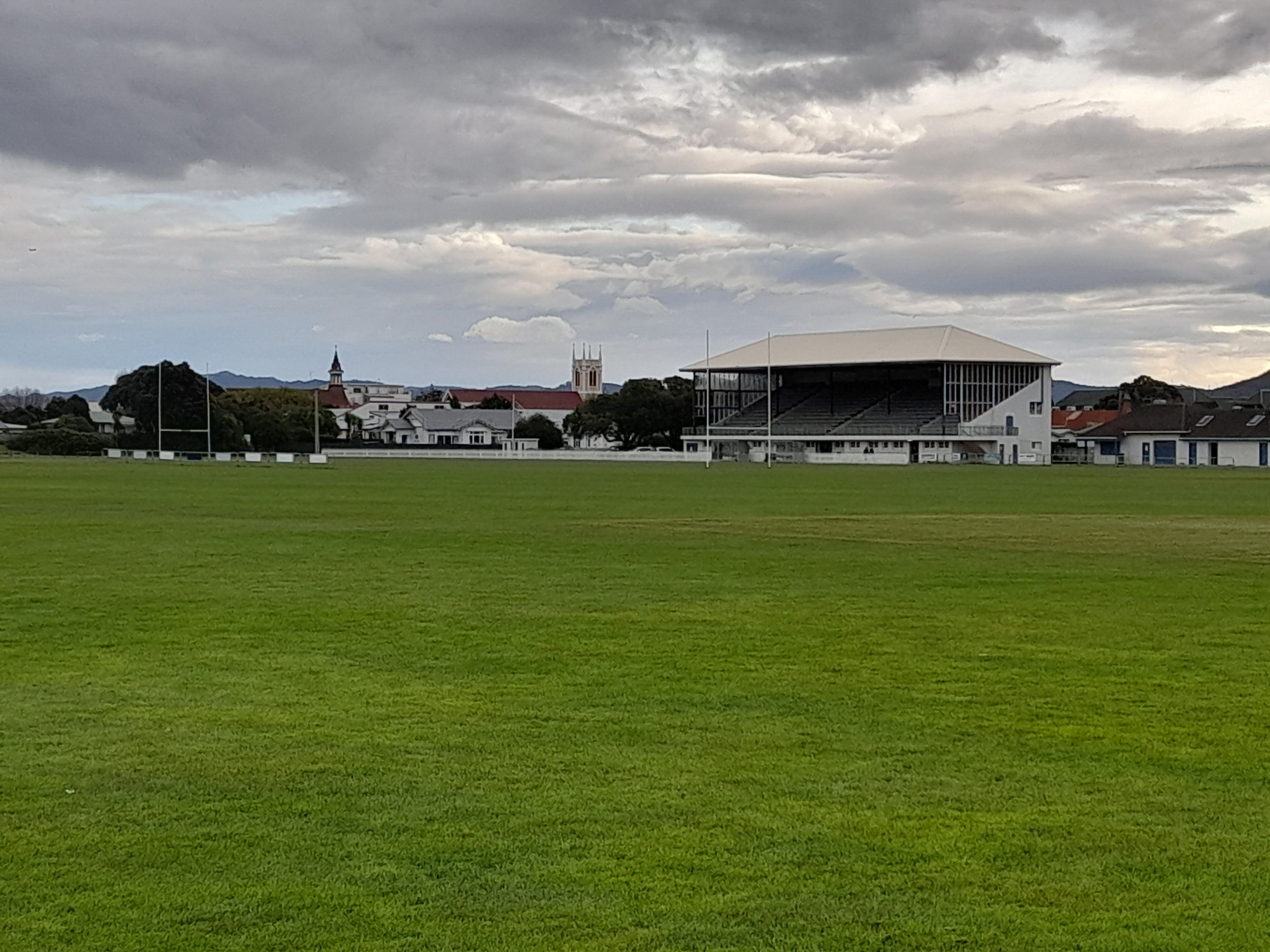
- The ground in 2022
- Interactive map of Petone Recreation Ground

Ground information
- Location: Lower Hutt, New Zealand
- Country: New Zealand
- Establishment: 1951 (first recorded match)

Team information
Wellington Women	(1998–2002)
Wellington	(1992–1999)
- As of 4 November 2011; Source: Ground profile

Petone Recreation Ground is a cricket ground in Lower Hutt, Wellington, New Zealand. The first recorded match held on the ground came in 1951 when Hutt Valley played Wanganui in the 1950/51 Hawke Cup.

The ground later held its first first-class match during the 1991/92 Shell Trophy when Wellington played Otago, with the match ending in an 8 wicket victory for Otago. A second first-class match was held there during the 1998/99 Shell Trophy when Wellington played Auckland, with the match ending in a draw. Wellington Women used Petone Recreation Ground as a home venue between 1998 and 2002.
