= Zavana Aranga =

New Zealand softball player (born 1974)

Personal information
- Born: 13 September 1974 (age 51)

Sport
- Country: New Zealand
- Sport: Softball; Rugby League

Achievements and titles
- Olympic finals: 2000

Zavana Aranga (born 13 September 1974) is a New Zealand softball player. She competed at the 2000 Summer Olympics in Sydney, where the New Zealand team placed sixth in the women's softball tournament. Aranga also played Rugby League for New Zealand, playing in international matches from 1995 to 1999, captaining the team in 1998.
