= Trish Hina =

NZ international dual-code rugby player

Personal information
- Born: 3 May 1977 (age 49)
- Height: 1.65 m (5 ft 5 in)
- Weight: 82 kg (181 lb; 12 st 13 lb)

Playing information
- Position: Five-eighth, Centre
Representative
Years	Team	Pld	T	G	FG	P
1997–2010	New Zealand	19	33	52	0	236

Rugby union career
- Position: Utility Back
Provincial / State sides
Years	Team	Apps	(Points)
2006	Wellington		
2009–	Auckland		
International career
Years	Team	Apps	(Points)
2010	New Zealand	4	(0)
Medals
Representing New Zealand
Women's rugby union
Rugby World Cup
Gold medal – first place	2010 England	Team competition

Trish Hina (born 3 May 1977) is a female rugby union player. She plays for New Zealand and Auckland. She has also represented New Zealand in rugby league, touch rugby and softball. She attended Naenae College

Hina was a member of the 2010 Women's Rugby World Cup winning squad.

In rugby league, Hina debuted for the national team in 1997, scoring five tries in the two Test matches against Australia. This performance was recognised by the New Zealand Rugby League with their Women's Player of the Year Award. Hina played against the touring Great Britain side in 1998. Hina participated in three Women's Rugby League World Cup tournaments: 2000, 2003 and 2008, all of which were won by New Zealand. Hina's last appearance for the Kiwi Ferns was in 2010.
