= Bay Roskill Vikings =

NZ rugby league club, based in Auckland

Club information
- Full name: Bay Roskill Rugby League Inc
- Colours: Green / White / Black /red
- Founded: 1979; 47 years ago

Current details
- Ground: Blockhouse Bay Reserve
- Coach: Jerome Ropati
- Competition: Auckland Rugby League

Records
- Norton Cup: 1972
- Phelan Shield: 2018

The Bay Roskill Vikings are a rugby league football club based in Mount Roskill and Blockhouse Bay, New Zealand, who compete in Auckland Rugby League's Sharman Cup competition. The club was established in 1979.

== History ==
The club was formed in October 1979 when the Mt Roskill Red Devils and the Blockhouse Bay Cougars amalgamated. Mount Roskill itself was a 1947 amalgamation of the Eden Roskill, Wesley, Mt Roskill clubs.

Mt Roskill won the Norton Cup in 1972. In 2018 they won the Phelan Shield for winning the second division regular season with a 15–0 win–loss record. Former Warriors players Jerome Ropati and Ben Henry both playing for the team during this season.

== Notable players ==
The following Bay Roskill Vikings players have made the New Zealand national rugby league team, nicknamed the Kiwis:

- Kevin Barry
- Monty Betham
- Bill Burgoyne
- Gary Freeman
- Ben Henry
- Steve Matai
- Dane O'Hara
- Henry Perenara
- Matt Utai
- Sione Lousi
- Sam Lousi
- Jerry Seuseu
- Jerome Ropati

Coach Bob Bailey has also coached the Kiwis.

== Bay Roskill Senior Team Records (2022-25) ==
The season record for the most senior men's team in the club.

Season	Grade	Name	Played	W	D	L	PF	PA	PD	Pts	Position (Teams)
2022	1st Grade (Fox Memorial)	Bay Roskill Vikings	8	4	1	3	242	222	20	9	4th of 9 in section 1, beat Manukau 28-22 in the preliminary finals, lost to Howick 44-6 in the QFs
2023	Fox Qualifiers	Bay Roskill Vikings	3	3	0	0	94	60	34	6	1st of 4 in Pool B
	Playoffs	Bay Roskill Vikings	11	2	0	9	228	354	-126	4	11th of 12
2024	Fox Qualifiers	Bay Roskill Vikings	3	3	0	0	94	60	34	6	1st of 4 in Pool C
	Fox Memorial	-	11	3	1	7	282	374	-92	7	9th of 12
2025	Fox Qualifiers	Bay Roskill Vikings	3	2	0	1	80	84	-4	4	2nd of 4
	Fox Memorial	-	12	6	0	6	288	316	-28	12	6th of 10
	Playoffs		1	0	0	1	28	30	-2	2	L v Manukau 28-30 in Prelim final
2022-2025	TOTAL		129	57	6	66	3257	3596	-339	117	
