= List of Norway women's national rugby union team matches =

The following is a list of Norway women's national rugby union team international matches.

== Overall ==
Norway's overall international match record against all nations, updated to 1 November 2025, is as follows:

	Games played	Won	Drawn	Lost	Win Percentage
Total	20	5	1	14	25%

== Full internationals ==
Won	Lost	Draw

=== 2000s ===
Test	Date	Opponent	PF	PA	Venue	Tournament
1	8 May 2003	Germany	0	75	Amsterdam, Netherlands	2003 FIRA Championship
2	11 May 2003	Denmark	10 (3)	10 (2)	Amsterdam, Netherlands	2003 FIRA Championship (Note: Norway won 3-2 on penalties)
3	2 May 2004	Germany	0	67	Toulouse, France	2004 FIRA Championship
4	5 May 2004	Netherlands	0	78	Toulouse, France	2004 FIRA Championship
5	8 May 2004	Denmark	8	5	Toulouse, France	2004 FIRA Championship
6	21 May 2005	Russia	0	25	Zenica, Bosnia	2005 FIRA Championship
7	21 May 2005	Bosnia and Herzegovina	30	0	Zenica, Bosnia	2005 FIRA Championship
8	23 May 2005	Russia	0	49	Zenica, Bosnia	2005 FIRA Championship
9	23 May 2005	Bosnia and Herzegovina	22	0	Zenica, Bosnia	2005 FIRA Championship
10	23 April 2006	Netherlands	0	84	San Dona Di Piave, Italy	2006 FIRA Championship
11	23 April 2006	Sweden	0	34	San Dona Di Piave, Italy	2006 FIRA Championship
12	26 April 2006	Belgium	0	41	San Dona Di Piave, Italy	2006 FIRA Championship
13	30 April 2006	Russia	5	62	San Dona Di Piave, Italy	2006 FIRA Championship
14	11 April 2007	Finland	12	12	Boitsfort, Belgium	2007 FIRA Championship
15	12 April 2007	Germany	0	48	Kituro (Brussels), Belgium	2007 FIRA Championship
16	15 April 2007	Serbia	62	0	Tervuren, Belgium	2007 FIRA Championship
17	24 October 2009	Finland	5	22	Oslo	

=== 2020s ===
Test	Date	Opponent	PF	PA	Venue	Tournament
18	5 October 2024	Latvia	0	50	Ogre City Stadium, Latvia	2024–25 Europe Conference
19	10 May 2025	Latvia	0	27	Voldsløkka idrettspark, Oslo	2024–25 Europe Conference
20	1 November 2025	Denmark	7	39	CSR/Nanok Rugby Club, Copenhagen	Test

== Other matches ==
Date	Norway	F	A	Opponent	Venue	Note
1 November 2003	Norwegian Barbarians	0	17	Denmark	Copenhagen	
2 November 2003	Norwegian Barbarians	5	27	Sweden	Copenhagen	
13 April 2007	Norway	13	73	(France) French Universities	Leuven, Belgium	2007 FIRA Championship
