= List of women's rugby sevens competitions =

Rugby sevens – a short form of the sport of rugby union – was first played in 1883, with the first (men's) internationals taking place in 1973. As women's rugby union developed in the 1960s and 1970s the format became very popular as it allowed games, and entire leagues, to be developed in countries even when player numbers were small, and it remains the main form the women's game is played in most parts of the world.

However, although the first Women's international rugby union 15-a-side test match took place in 1982, it was not until 1997 before the first 7-a-side internationals were played, when the Hong Kong Sevens included a women's tournament for the first time.

Over the next decade the number of tournaments grew, with almost every region developing regular championship. This reached its zenith with the first Women's Sevens World Cup in 2009, shortly followed by the announcement that women's rugby sevens will be included in the Olympics from 2016. In 2011/12 the IRB organised three official women's challenges tournaments in Dubai, Hong Kong and London. After the success of these events an annual IRB Women's Sevens World Series was launched from the start of the 2012/13 season.

The following is a list of all women's international tournaments that have been traced since 1997, listed chronologically with the earliest first, with links to result details, where known. If two tournaments are run concurrently the apparently more senior will be listed first.

Some tournaments include both club and national teams, and these are only included where the majority of teams are International. Occasionally what are effectively national teams play unofficially under an assumed name – these games are also noted where this is known.

The summary section looks at each region in turn and attempts to draw some conclusions about the relative strengths of the participants. This is a little flawed due to the absence of some results and information as well as the inclusion of non-international teams to make up the numbers but should give the best guess available.

== 1997 ==
=== Hong Kong Sevens ===
- 15–16 March 1997
- Winners: New Zealand Black Ferns
- Competitors: Arabian Gulf, Australia, Canada, England, Fiji, Hong Kong, Japan, Netherlands, New Zealand Wild Ducks, Scotland, Singapore, United States

== 1998 ==
=== Carib International Sevens (Exhibition game) ===
- December 1998
- Trinidad & Tobago 12–29 St. Vincent & the Grenadines

YC&AC Invitational Women's Sevens Tournament

March 28, 1998

Winners New Zealand

Competitors: Japan1 Japan 2, New Zealand, World Invitational team,

== 1999 ==
=== Hong Kong Sevens ===
- 22–24 March 1999
- Winners: New Zealand Wild Ducks
- Competitors: Arabian Gulf, Australia, China, England, Hong Kong, Japan, New Zealand Wild Ducks, Russia, Samoa, Singapore, United States
- YC&AC International Women's Sevens Tournament March 28, 1999 Winners New Zealand Competitors: Japan 1, Japan 2, New Zealand, World Invitational team, USA, Samoa

== 2000 ==
=== Asian Championship ===
- 22–24 March 2000. Played as part of the Hong Kong Sevens
- Winners: Kazakhstan
- Competitors: Arabian Gulf, Hong Kong, Japan, Kazakhstan, Singapore, Thailand

=== Hong Kong Sevens ===
- 22–24 March 2000
- Winners: New Zealand
- Competitors: Arabian Gulf, Australia, Hong Kong, Japan, Kazakhstan, Netherlands, New Zealand, Samoa, Singapore, Thailand, United States, Wales

YC&AC International Women's Sevens Tournament

April 1, 2000

Winners New Zealand

Competitors: Japan, New Zealand, World Invitational team, USA

=== Jamaica vs Cayman Islands ===
- Date unknown
- Winners: Cayman Islands, two matches to nil. Scores unknown.

== 2001 ==
=== Asian Championship ===
- 28–30 March 2001. Played as part of the Hong Kong Sevens
- Winners: Kazakhstan
- Competitors: Arabian Gulf, China, Japan, Kazakhstan, Singapore, Thailand

=== Hong Kong Sevens ===
- 28–30 March 2001
- Winners: New Zealand
- Competitors: Arabian Gulf, Australia, England, Hong Kong, Japan, Kazakhstan, Netherlands, New Zealand, Samoa, Singapore, Sweden, Thailand, United States

YC&AC International Women's Sevens Tournament

April 7, 2001

Winners New Zealand

Competitors: Japan, New Zealand, World Invitational team, USA

== 2002 ==
=== Whangarei tournament ===
- Venue/Date: Whangārei, New Zealand, 17 February 2002 (Source NZ Rugby, USA Rugby)
- New Zealand A 12–12 United States
- New Zealand B 31–5 Invitation
- New Zealand B 12–5 United States
- New Zealand A 35–0 Invitation
- United States 19–0 Invitation
- New Zealand A ?-? New Zealand B
- United States 14–12 United Kawakawa
- NZ Maori 41–7 United States
- NZ Maori 'B' 10–5 United States
- United States 0–0 North Harbour
- United States 5–0 NZ Maori 'B' (3rd place match)

=== Asian Championship ===
- 21–22 March 2002. Played as part of the Hong Kong Sevens
- Winners: Kazakhstan
- Competitors: Arabian Gulf, China, Hong Kong, Japan, Kazakhstan, Thailand

=== Hong Kong Sevens ===
- 21–22 March 2002
- Winner: Aotearoa Maori
- Competitors: Arabian Gulf, China, Hong Kong, Japan, Kazakhstan, Aotearoa Maori, Thailand, United States

== 2003 ==
=== Lomai tournament ===
- Fiji 7–0 United States
- Fiji 0–21 United States

=== Whangarei tournament ===
- United States are known to have gone on to this tournament before Hong Kong.

=== Asian Tournament ===
- At Hong Kong, 27 March 2003
- Winners: Kazakhstan
- Competitors: Arabian Gulf, China, Kazakhstan, Thailand, Singapore, Hong Kong, Hong Kong Barbarians, Kyrgyzstan, Sri Lanka; Uzbekistan

=== Hong Kong Sevens ===
- 27–28 March 2003
- Winners: Aotearoa Maori
- Competitors: Arabian Gulf, England, Fiji, Hong Kong, Kazakhstan, Aotearoa Maori, Thailand, United States

=== European Tournament ===
- At Lunel, France, 24 May 2003
- Winners: Spain
- Competitors: Belgium, Bulgaria, Croatia, Czech Republic, France, Norway, Portugal, Spain, Sweden, Switzerland

=== South Pacific Games ===
- Plans were afoot for a women's sevens tournament but it required six teams. It is not thought that this was achieved.

== 2004 ==
=== CAR North Tournament ===
- At Tunisia, 5–7 March 2004
- Winners: Unknown
- Competitors: Malta, Tunisia and others

=== Hong Kong Sevens ===
- At Hong Kong, March 2004
- Competitors: Australia, China, Hong Kong, Kazakhstan, Aotearoa Maori, Singapore, Sri Lanka, Thailand, United States
- Winner: Aotearoa Maori

=== South America Tournament ===
- At: Barquisimeto, Venezuela, 20–21 April 2004
- Competitors: Argentina, Brazil, Chile, Colombia, Paraguay, Peru, Uruguay, Venezuela
- Winner: Brazil

=== Rwanda v Burundi ===
- At:Unknown. May 2004
- Rwanda 5–0 Burundi

=== Asian Tournament ===
- At Almaty, Kazakhstan, 15–16 May 2004
- Competitors: Arabian Gulf, Hong Kong, Kazakhstan, Kazakhstan 2, Kyrgyzstan, Singapore, Thailand, Uzbekistan
- Winner: Kazakhstan

=== European Tournament ===
- At Limoges, France, 21–22 May 2004
- Winners: England
- Competitors: Belgium, Bosnia and Herzegovina, Bulgaria, Croatia, Czech Republic, England, France, Italy, Lithuania, Norway, Poland, Portugal, Spain, Sweden, Switzerland

=== Training Tournament (Central Europe) ===
- At Székesfehérvár, Hungary, 26 June 2004
- Competitors: Austria, Croatia, Hungary
- Hungary 36–5 Austria
- Other scores not recorded

== 2005 ==
=== CAR North Tournament ===
- At Tunisia
- Winners: Unknown
- Competitors: Unknown

=== Hong Kong Sevens ===
- At Hong Kong, March 2005
- Competitors: Australia, China, Hong Kong, Japan, Aotearoa Maori, Singapore, Thailand, United States
- Winner: Aotearoa Maori

=== Asian Tournament ===
- At Singapore, 15–16 April 2005
- Competitors: Arabian Gulf, China, Hong Kong, Japan, Kazakhstan, Singapore, Sri Lanka, Thailand, Uzbekistan
- Winner: Kazakhstan

=== European Qualification Tournament ===
- At: Prague, 14–15 May 2005
- Winner: Russia
- Participants: Austria, Bulgaria, Czech Republic, Germany, Hungary, Israel, Lithuania, Malta, Norway, Poland, Russia

=== FIRA Women's European Championship ===
- At: Lunel, France, 25–26 June 2005
- Winner: England
- Participants: Belgium, Croatia, England, France, Italy, Netherlands, Portugal, Spain, Sweden, Switzerland

=== CAR African Sevens ===
- Venue/Date: Kampala, 5–6 November 2005

Cancelled for financial reasons

=== Training Tournament (Central Europe) ===
- Venue/Date: Hungary, 6 November 2005
- Hungary 24–10 Austria
- Austria 10–12 Croatia
- Hungary played Croatia

=== NAWIRA Tournament ===
- At: Barbados, 19–20 November 2005
- Winner: United States
- Participants: Barbados, Guyana, Jamaica, Saint Lucia, Saint Vincent and the Grenadines, Trinidad and Tobago, United States

=== South America Tournament ===
- At: São Paulo, Brazil, 19–20 November 2005
- Competitors: Argentina, Brazil, Chile, Colombia, Paraguay, Peru, Uruguay, Venezuela
- Winner: Brazil

=== Valentin Martinez International Tournament ===
- At: Montevideo, Uruguay, date unknown
- Winner: Brazil A
- Participants: Argentina A, Argentina B, Brazil A, Brazil B, Chile, Uruguay A, Uruguay B

== 2006 ==
=== USA Tournament ===
- Venue: Los Angeles
- Winner: United States
- Participants: Canada, United States

=== Asian Championship ===
- Venue/Date: Taskent, Uzbekistan, 15–16 May
- Winner: China
- Participants: Arabian Gulf, China, Hong Kong, Japan, Kazakhstan, Kyrgyzstan, Singapore, Thailand, Uzbekistan

=== CAR North Tournament ===
- At Tunisia
- Winners: Unknown
- Competitors: Unknown

=== CAR South Tournament ===
- At Uganda
- Winners: Unknown
- Competitors: Unknown

=== Hong Kong Sevens ===
- At Hong Kong, March 2006
- Competitors: Australia, China, Guam, Hong Kong, Japan, Netherlands, Aotearoa Maori, Singapore, Sri Lanka, Thailand, United States
- Winner: Aotearoa Maori

=== Emerging European Nations ===
- Venue: Hungary
- No results published

=== FIRA-AER European Championship – Division A ===
- Venue/Date: Limoges, France, 25–27 May 2006
- Winner: Wales
- Participants: Belgium, Czech Republic, England, France, Germany, Ireland, Italy, Lithuania, Netherlands, Norway, Portugal, Russia, Spain, Sweden, Switzerland, Wales

=== FIRA-AER European Championship – Division B ===
- Venue: Limoges, France, 25–27 May 2006
- Winner: Romania
- Participants: Andorra, Australia, Bosnia and Herzegovina, Bulgaria, Hungary, Israel, Luxembourg, Malta, Poland, Romania

=== CAR African Championship ===
- Venue: Kyadondo Rugby Club, Kampala, Uganda
- Winner: Emerging South Africa
- Competitors: Burundi, Kenya, Emerging South Africa, Rwanda, Uganda, Uganda Select, Zambia, Zimbabwe

=== Friendly Games ===
- Date/Venue: 24–25 July 2006, Grossmugl, Austria. (Source Austria Union)
- The only information is that teams from Austria, Hungary, Croatia, Bavaria, and Mugl took part in a men's and women's tournament.

=== NAWIRA Tournament ===
- Date/Venue: 11–12 November 2006, Garrison Savannah, Barbados. (Source NAWIRA)
- Winners: Jamaica
- Participants: Barbados, Jamaica, Guyana, Trinidad and Tobago, Saint Lucia, Saint Vincent and the Grenadines

== 2007 ==
=== South America Tournament ===
- At: Vina Del Mar, Chile, 12–13 January 2007
- Competitors: Argentina, Brazil, Chile, Chile Invitation, Colombia, Peru, Uruguay, Venezuela
- Winner: Brazil

=== USA Tournament ===
- At: San Diego, 9–10 February 2007
- Winner: Canada B
- Participants: Canada A, Canada B, China, USA A, USA B

=== CAR North Tournament ===
- At Tunia
- Winners: Tunisia
- Competitors: Arabian Gulf, Ivory Coast, Tunisia, Tunisian Universities, Uganda

=== CAR South Tournament ===
- At Uganda
- Winners: Unknown
- Competitors: Unknown

=== T-EN Tournament ===
- Venue: Székesfehérvár, Hungary, 18 March 2007
- Winner: Croatia
- Participants: Austria, Croatia, Hungary

=== Hong Kong Sevens ===
- At Hong Kong, March 2007
- Competitors: Arabian Gulf, Australia, Canada, China, Hong Kong, Japan, Kazakhstan, Aotearoa Maori, Papua New Guinea, Singapore, Thailand, United States
- Winner: Aotearoa Maori

=== Asian Championship ===
- At Doha, 27–28 April 2007
- Competitors: Arabian Gulf, Japan, Singapore, Hong Kong, Kazakhstan, Thailand, Sri Lanka, Uzbekistan
- Winner: Kazakhstan

=== Emerging European Nations ===
- Venue: Katowice, Poland
- Winner: Finland
- Participants: Bosnia and Herzegovina, Bulgaria, Czech Republic, Finland, Poland, Austria/Czech II

=== FIRA-AER European Championship – Division B ===
- Venue: Zenica, Bosnia, 19–20 May 2007
- Winner: Finland
- Participants: Austria, Bosnia and Herzegovina, Denmark, Finland, Hungary, Israel, Latvia, Luxembourg, Malta, Moldova, Serbia

=== FIRA-AER European Championship – Division A ===
- Venue: Zagreb, Croatia, 26–27 May 2007
- Winner: France U20
- Participants: Andorra, Belgium, Bulgaria, Croatia, Czech Republic, France U20; Germany, Lithuania, Norway, Poland, Romania, Switzerland

=== FIRA-AER European Championship – Top 10 ===
- Venue: Lunel, France, 2–3 June 2007
- Winner: France
- Participants: England, France, Ireland, Italy, Netherlands, Portugal, Russia, Spain, Sweden, Wales

=== CAR African Championship ===
- Venue: Kyadondo Rugby Club, Kampala, Uganda
- Winner: Emerging South Africa
- Competitors: Burundi, Kenya, Emerging South Africa, Rwanda, Tunisia, Uganda, Uganda Select, Zambia, Zimbabwe

=== T-EN League ===
- Venue: Grossmugl, Austria, 23 June 2007
- Winner: Croatia
- Participants: Austria, Croatia, Hungary

=== South East Asia Sevens ===
- Venue: Singapore, 6 October 2007.
- Winner: Thailand
- Participants: Singapore, Thailand, South Korea, Laos, Cambodia

=== Borneo Sevens ===
- Venue: Borneo, 2 and 3 November 2007.
- Results unknown
- Participants: China, Hong Kong, New Zealand, Guam, Laos, Cambodia.

=== NAWIRA Tournament ===
- At: Winton Rugby Centre, Nassau, Bahamas, 17–18 November 2007
- Winner: Canada
- Participants: Canada, Guyana, Jamaica, USA Development Eagles

=== Pacific Tournament ===
- At: Port Moresby, Papua New Guinea
- Winner: Fiji
- Participants: Fiji, Niue, Papua New Guinea, Samoa

=== Dubai Tournament ===
- At: Dubai, 1–2 December 2007
- Participants: Canada, United States, plus club teams
- Results not published.

=== South East Asia Games ===
- Venue: Sursnaree, Thailand, 9–11 December 2007
- Winner: Thailand
- Thailand 52–0 Cambodia
- Laos 0–36 Singapore
- Thailand 14–12 Singapore
- Cambodia 0–20 Laos
- Cambodia 0–29 Singapore
- Thailand 52–0 Laos

==== Classification Stages ====
Semi Finals

- Thailand 43–0 Cambodia
- Singapore 27–0 Laos

Nation	Won	Drawn	Lost	For	Against
Thailand	3	0	0	118	12
Singapore	2	0	1	77	14
Laos	1	0	2	20	88
Cambodia	0	0	3	0	101

3rd/4th Match (bronze medal)

- Cambodia 0–15 Laos

Final (gold and silver medal)

- Thailand 19–5 Singapore

== 2008 ==
=== South American Tournament and World Cup Qualifier ===
- At: Punta del Este, Uruguay, 18–19 January 2008
- Competitors: Argentina, Brazil, Chile, Colombia, Paraguay, Peru, Uruguay, Venezuela
- Winner: Brazil

=== USA Sevens ===
- At: San Diego, 9–10 February 2008
- Winner: United States
- Participants: Canada, Canada A, Canada Collegiate, South Africa, United States, USA A

=== Emerging European Nations ===
- Venue: Austria, 21–24 March 2008
- Winner: Finland
- Participants: Austria, Bosnia and Herzegovina, Bulgaria, Croatia, Czech Republic, Finland, Hungary, Luxembourg, Poland, Serbia

=== Hong Kong Sevens ===
- At: Hong Kong, 27–28 March 2008
- Competitors: Arabian Gulf, Canada, China, Fiji, France, Hong Kong, Japan, Kazakhstan, Netherlands, Singapore, Thailand, United States
- Winner: United States

=== World Cup Pre-Qualifier (Europe) ===
- Venue: Bosnia
- Winner: Romania. Also qualified: Finland, Israel
- Participants: Austria, Bosnia and Herzegovina, Bulgaria, Croatia, Finland, Georgia, Israel, Latvia, Lithuania, Romania, Serbia, Slovenia

=== Amsterdam Sevens 2008 ===
- At: Amsterdam, 17–18 May 2008.
- Competitors: Brazil, Canada, Czech Republic, United States
- Winner: Samurai St George's

=== London IRB (Men's) Sevens 2008 (Exhibition game) ===
- At: Twickenham 25 May 2008, (during men's IRB sevens).
- England 14–10 New Zealand Aotearoa Maori

=== World Cup Pre-Qualifier (Europe) ===
- Venue: Belgium, 30 – May 2008
- Winner: Germany. Also qualified: Andorra, Moldova. Czech Republic added as best fourth place (over Bulgaria), following withdrawal of Scotland.
- Participants: Andorra, Belgium, Czech Republic, Denmark, Germany, Hungary, Luxembourg, Malta, Moldova, Norway, Poland, Switzerland

=== Home Nations Cup 2008 ===
At: Edinburgh 1 June 2008.

- Winner: England
- Only the results of games involving England were published.
- Scotland ??-?? Wales
- England 42–5 Wales
- Scotland 12–19 England
- England 31–10 Wales
- Scotland ??-?? Wales
- Scotland 0–24 England

=== One Off Match – Zambia 2008 ===
- At: Kitwe, Zambia, 31 May 2008.
- Zambia 36–0 Zimbabwe

=== Madrid Sevens – 2008 ===
- At: Madrid 7 June 2008
- Final Italy 17–10 Spain

=== FIRA AER Top 16 and World Cup Qualifier ===
- Venue: Limoges, France 14–15 June 2008
- Winner: England
- Participants: Andorra, Czech Republic, England, Finland, France, Germany, Israel, Italy, Moldova, Netherlands, Romania, Russia, Spain, Sweden, Wales. Scotland withdrew a week before the tournament was played.

=== International Tournament – Reunion 2008 ===
- At: Réunion 23 to 30 June
- Mauritius were planned to take part but appear to have dropped out.

Nation	Won	Drawn	Lost	For	Against
South Africa	4	0	0	182	5
France	3	0	1	164	5
Madagascar	1	1	2	47	74
Reunion	1	1	2	36	116
Mayotte	0	0	4	0	219

- Réunion 31–0 Mayotte
- France 43–0 Madagascar
- South Africa 75–0 Mayotte
- France 45–0 Réunion
- Madagascar 37–0 Mayotte
- Réunion 0–66 South Africa
- Mayotte 0–76 France
- Madagascar 5–5 Réunion
- Madagascar 5–26 South Africa
- South Africa 15–0 France

=== Oceania World Cup Qualifier ===
- At: Samoa, 25–26 July 2008
- Winner: Australia. New Zealand also qualified.
- Participants: Australia, Fiji, New Zealand, Niue, Samoa

=== T-EN Central European Tournament ===
- At: Rauris, Austria, 19 September 2008
- Winner: Hungary
- Participants: Austria, Czech Republic, Hungary

=== African World Cup Qualifier ===
- Venue: Kyadondo Rugby Club, Kampala, Uganda
- Winner: South Africa
- Competitors: Burundi, Kenya, South Africa, Rwanda, Uganda, Uganda A, Zambia, Zimbabwe

=== Asian World Cup Qualifier ===
- At: Hong Kong, 4–5 October 2008
- Winner: Japan
- Competitors: Arabian Gulf, China, Hong Kong, Japan, Kazakhstan, Singapore, Sri Lanka, Taiwan, Thailand

=== T-EN Central European Tournament ===
- Venue: Slovenia, 19 October 2008
- Winner: Hungary
- Participants: Austria, Hungary, Slovenia

=== North America/Caribbean World Cup Qualifier ===
- At: Nassau, Bahamas, 25–26 October 2008
- Winner: Canada
- Participants: Barbados, Bermuda, Canada, Cayman Islands, Guyana, Jamaica, Trinidad and Tobago, United States

=== Friendly Sevens at Brno 2008 ===
- At Brno, Czech Republic. 2 November 2008
- Austria are thought to have participated.

=== Japan Demonstration Game 2008 ===
- 22 November 2008, Japan. Not strictly an International, this was a game played amongst Japan squad members prior to the men's Japan USA XV aside match.
- Reds 12–12 Whites

=== Asian Development Tournament ===
- Laos, 26 to 29 November 2008
- No scores published

=== Dubai Tournament ===
- At Dubai, 27–29 November 2008. A tournament "for women's teams who play rugby regularly at an international/county/provincial standard". The official status of some teams is unclear. England played as "Sporting Chance Foundation".
- Winner: Sporting Chance Foundation
- Participants: 12 teams, including four national selections, though two played under assumed names – Canada, Sporting Chance Foundation, WOP Netherlands, United States

=== Nelson Mandela Bay Tournament 2008 ===
- Venue: Port Elizabeth, South Africa, 13–14 December 2008
- Final South Africa 36–0 Uganda

=== FIRA Warm Up Tournament 2008 ===
- Venue:Montpellier, France 20–21 December 2008
- Group Game: France 12–0 Spain
- Final: France 19–7 Spain

== 2009 ==
=== Rwanda Burundi Festival 2009 ===
- At Burundi, January 2009.
- No details are known.
- Participants: Rwanda, Burundi

=== South American Tournament ===
- At: Mar del Plata, Argentina, 24–25 January 2009
- Competitors: Argentina, Brazil, Chile, Colombia, Paraguay, Peru, Uruguay, Venezuela
- Winner: Brazil

=== Málaga Sevens 2009 ===
- At: Málaga 14–15 February 2009
- Some international sides used this tournament as a warm up for Dubai and the following are results.
- France 36–0 Andalucia
- Netherlands 33–0 Spain
- France 26–7 Netherlands
- Spain 24–0 Andalucia
- Netherlands 22–0 Andalucia
- France 24–14 Spain
- Semi Final: France 41–0 Andalucia
- Semi Final: Netherlands 14–17 Spain
- 3rd Place: Netherlands 49–0 Andalucia
- Final: France 12–19 Spain

=== Minor Nations Training 2009 ===
- At London, 19–22 February 2009.
- Finland (two teams) and Austria trained at London Wasps and this was followed by a tournament involving Finland, Finland 2, Austria, Wasps, Wasps 2 and Metropolitan Police.
- Finland won all their games in a limited round robin (all teams played four games).
- Participants: Finland, Finland 2, Austria
- Group Games: Austria 0–36 Finland
- Group Games: Finland 2 5–17 Austria
- Plate Final: Finland 2 17–5 Austria
- Cup Final: Finland 38–0 Wasps 2

=== IRB Sevens World Cup ===
- At: Dubai, 5–7 March 2009
- Winner: Australia
- Participants: Australia, Brazil, Canada, China, England, France, Italy, Japan, New Zealand, Netherlands, Russia, South Africa, Spain, Thailand, Uganda, United States

=== F-EN (Central European) Tournament ===
- Venue: Ljubljana, Serbia, 7 March 2009
- Winner: Croatia. Results from games involving Bosnia and Herzegovina and Serbia were not included in the tournament, and not published.
- Participants: Austria, Bosnia and Herzegovina, Croatia, Hungary, Serbia, Slovenia

=== F-EN (Central European) League ===
- Venue: Zagreb, Croatia, 21 March 2009
- Results not published

=== Hong Kong Sevens ===
- At: Hong Kong, 27 March 2009
- Competitors: Arabian Gulf, Australia, China, Guam, Hong Kong, Japan, Papua New Guinea, Singapore, Thailand, Tunisia
- Winner: Australia

=== Europe Emerging Nations ===
- At: Zanka, Hungary, 12 April 2009
- Winner: Hungary
- Participants: Austria, Bosnia and Herzegovina, Croatia, Czech Republic, European Mix, Finland, Hungary, Poland

=== Asian Championship ===
- At: Bangkok, Thailand, 30 May 2009
- Competitors: Arabian Gulf, China, Guam, Hong Kong, Iran, Kazakhstan, Singapore, Taiwan, Thailand, Uzbekistan
- Winner: China

=== CAR North West ===
- Venue: Accra, Ghana
- Winner: Tunisia
- Competitors: Burkina Faso, Egypt, Ghana, Rwanda, Morocco, Niger, Togo, Tunisia

=== FIRA-AER European Tournament – Division B ===
- At: Zenica, Bosnia
- Winner: Switzerland
- Participants: Bosnia and Herzegovina, Denmark, Georgia, Hungary, Luxembourg, Poland, Serbia, Slovenia, Switzerland, Ukraine

=== Roma Sevens 2009 ===
- Venue: Rome, Italy, 5 & 6 June 2009
- Winner: Samurai Ladies International (UK)
- Participants: Wooden Spoon, Italy, Israel, The Bassets Ladies, Murrayfields Wanderers RFC

=== Reunion Tournament 2009 ===
At: Réunion 20 June 2009 Participants: Winners France, runners up Pretoria University, third Réunion, unknown Mayotte, Madagascar

France results:

- Réunion 0–36 France
- France 26–0 Madagascar
- France 61–0 Mayotte
- France 19–7 Pretoria University

=== F-EN (Central Europe) Finals ===
- At: Vienna, Austria 27–28 June
- No results published

=== FIRA-AER European Tournament – Division A ===
- At: Bruges. Belgium
- Winner: Finland
- Participants: Andorra, Austria, Belgium, Belgium B, Bulgaria, Croatia, Czech Republic, Finland, Israel, Latvia, Malta, Romania

=== FIRA-AER European Tournament – Top 10 ===
- At: Hanover, Germany
- Winner: England
- Participants: England, France, Germany, Italy, Moldova, Netherlands, Portugal, Russia, Spain, Sweden

=== Banc ABC Tournament, Zimbabwe ===
- At Harare, Zimbabwe 12 September 2009
- Zimbabwe 12–24 Zambia
- Final placings are believed to have been 1st, Zambia, 2nd, Zimbabwe, 3rd, Zambia B, 4th, Zimbabwe B

=== Shanghai Sevens 2009 ===
- At: Shanghai, China 12 and 13 September 2009
- Participants: China, Guam
- Results unknown

=== CAR African Tournament ===
- Cancelled

=== Borneo Sevens 2009 ===
- At: Borneo. 31 October
- Guam were mooted as a participant.
- Thailand 39–0 India
- Thailand 52–0 Malaysia
- India 21–10 Malaysia

=== Bangkok Sevens 2009 ===
- At: Bangkok, Thailand 31 October. Thai club sides predominated.
- Kazakhstan 20–14 Arabian Gulf

=== NACRA Caribbean Tournament ===
- At:Mexico City
- Winner: Guyana
- Participants: Bahamas, Cayman Islands, Guyana, Mexico, Saint Lucia

=== Dubai Tournament ===
- At: Dubai, 4 December 2009. A tournament "for women's teams who play rugby regularly at an international/county/provincial standard". The official status of some teams is unclear.
- Participants: 12 teams, including five official national selections – Arabian Gulf, France, Georgia, Kenya, United States

=== East Asian Games 2009 ===
- At: Hong Kong 5 December 2009,

Group Games

- China 24–0 Japan
- Guam 12–10 Hong Kong
- Japan 50–0 Guam
- China 44–0 Hong Kong
- China 46–0 Guam
- Japan 7–5 Hong Kong

Classification Stages

Semi Final

- China 20–5 Hong Kong
- Japan 19–5 Guam

Plate Final

- Hong Kong 15–0 Guam

Final

- China 34–12 Japan

=== European Emerging Nations ===
- At: Slovenia 26 September 2009
- Participants: Austria, Hungary, Slovenia
- Winner: Hungary

== 2010 ==
=== South American Games ===
- Venue: Mar del Plata, Argentina. 5 – 6–7 January 2010
- Winner: Brazil
- Participants: Brazil, Chile, Uruguay, Peru, Venezuela, Colombia, Argentina, Paraguay

=== USA Tournament ===
- Venue: Las Vegas. 12 February 2010
- Winner: China
- Participants: Canada National University, China, France, Germany, USA Blue, USA White

=== European Emerging Nations ===
- At: Ljubljana, 21 March 2010
- Participants: Austria, Croatia, Hungary, Slovenia
- Winner: Hungary

=== Hong Kong Sevens ===
- At: Hong Kong, 26–27 March 2010
- Competitors: Arabian Gulf, China, Hong Kong, Japan, Kazakhstan, Papua New Guinea, Malaysia, Singapore, Thailand, plus Aussie Amazons, Aotearoa Maori, South African Tuks
- Winner: Aussie Amazons

=== Emerging Nations Camp ===
- At: Zanka, Hungary, 4 April 2010
- Competitors: Austria, Croatia, Czech Republic, Denmark, Finland, Hungary, Luxembourg, Poland, Slovenia
- Winner: Hungary

=== F-EN League ===
- At: Székesfehervár, Hungary, 26 April 2010
- Competitors: Austria, Croatia, Czech Republic, Hungary, Slovenia
- Winner: Hungary

=== St Lucia v Guadeloupe ===
- Venue: Castries Comprehensive Secondary School (CCSS) Ground. 8 May 2010
- Matches were of thirty minutes duration with a five minutes half time break.
- Saint Lucia 69–5 Guadeloupe
- Saint Lucia 47–5 Guadeloupe

=== FIRA-AER European Tournament – Division A ===
- Venue: Bucharest, Romania. 22–23 May 2010
- Winner: Moldova
- Participants: Belgium, Austria, Andorra, Croatia, Bulgaria, Moldova, Switzerland, Romania, Czech Republic, Latvia, Malta, Israel

=== FIRA-AER European Tournament – Division B ===
- Venue: Odense, Denmark. 22–23 May 2010
- Winner: Ukraine
- Participants: Denmark, Bosnia and Herzegovina, Georgia, Hungary, Nordic Barbarians, Slovenia, Serbia, Poland, Norway, Lithuania, Luxembourg

=== Amsterdam Sevens ===
- Venue/Date: Amsterdam, Netherlands 22–23 May 2010
- Participants: Germany, WOP, Spain
- Winner: WOP

=== CAR North West ===
- Venue: Ouagadougou, Burkina Faso, 28 & 29 May 2010.
- Winner: Tunisia
- Participants: Burkina Faso, Morocco, Ghana, Togo, Ivory Coast, Tunisia

=== Roma Sevens 2010 ===
- Venue: Rome, Italy, 3 & 4 June 2010
- Winner: New Zealand Aoteaora Maori
- Participants: France, Colombia, Italy, Spain, New Zealand Aoteaora Maori, HJMKJ Moscow

=== Carcassonne Sevens ===
- Venue: Carcassonne, Italy. 19–20 June 2010.
- There was only 3 national sides (Portugal, Georgia and Bulgaria) – but Portugal were on a much higher level. The teams agreed to form the Barbarians Filles between Bulgaria and Georgia to be able to play Portugal.
- Portugal 63–0 Bulgaria
- Portugal 46–7 Georgia
- Final: Portugal 66–0 Barbarians Fillies

=== FIRA-AER European Tournament – Top 10 ===
- Venue: Moscow, Russia. 10–11 July 2010
- Winner: Spain
- Participants: England, Finland, France, Germany, Italy, Netherlands, Portugal, Russia, Spain, Sweden

=== Asian Championship ===
- Venue: Guangzhou, China. 24–25 July 2010
- Winner: China
- Participants: China, Taiwan, Kazakhstan, South Korea, Hong Kong, India, Japan, Laos, Malaysia, Hong Kong, Philippines, Thailand, Singapore, Uzbekistan

=== NACRA Sevens Championship ===
- Venue: Georgetown, Guyana. 26–27 July 2010
- Winner: Guyana
- Participants: Cayman Islands, Guyana, Jamaica, Mexico, Saint Lucia, Trinidad and Tobago

=== Cortina Sevens ===
- Venue: Cortina d'Ampezzo, Italy. 31 July – 1 August 2010
- Matches included:
- Italy 10–0 Iran
- Italy 33–0 Iran
- Valsugana (ITA) 3–10 Iran

=== Castle Sevens ===
- Venue: Lusaka, Zambia. 28–29 August 2010
- Winner: Zambia
- Participants: Botswana, South African Tukkies, Zambia, Zimbabwe
- Pool:Botswana 17–10 Zambia
- Pool: Botswana 5–20 Zambia
- Final: Zambia 14–12 Zimbabwe
- [Other results not published]

=== Friendly Cup (Coupe de l'Amitié) ===
- Venue: Lviv, Ukraine, 2 October 2010
- Winner: Ukraine 1
- Participants: 1st Ukraine I; 2nd Moldova; 3rd Romania; 4 Hungary; 5th Poland; 6th Lithuania; 7th Ukraine II; 8th Lviv Region
- Some details have now emerged:

Pool 1 positions

1. Ukraine I
2. Romania
3. Lithiania
4. Lviv regional team

Pool 2 positions

1. Moldova
2. Hungary
3. Poland
4. Ukraine II

Hungarian results:

- Hungary 46–0 Poland
- Moldova 29–0 Hungary
- Ukraine II 0–41 Hungary
- Romania 17–5 Hungary

=== Asia Pacific Sevens ===
- Venue: Kota Kinabalu, Borneo, 29–31 October 2010
- Winner: Kazakhstan
- Participants: Cook Islands, India, Kazakhstan, Papua New Guinea, Samoa, Singapore, Tonga

=== BancABC Sevens ===
- Venue: Harare Sports Club, Zimbabwe
- Winner: Pangolins
- Participants: Botswana, Zambia, Pangolins; Zimbabwe B;Tukkies
- Final: Pangolins 24–19 Zambia
- Other results unpublished

=== Singapore Sevens ===
- Venue: Singapore Cricket Club, 5–6 November 2010
- Winner: Japan
- Participants: Hong Kong, India, Indonesia, Japan, Malaysia, Singapore

Group A

- Hong Kong 7–12 Japan
- Hong Kong beat India
- India 0–29 Japan

Nation	Won	Drawn	Lost	For	Against
Japan	2	0	0	41	7
Hong Kong	1	0	1	?	?
India	0	0	2	?	?

Play-offs

- Hong Kong 20–0 Indonesia
- India beat Malaysia

Group B

- Singapore 27–0 Malaysia
- Indonesia lost to Malaysia
- Singapore 60–0 Indonesia

Nation	Won	Drawn	Lost	For	Against
Singapore	2	0	0	87	0
Malaysia	1	0	1	?	?
Indonesia	0	0	2	?	?

Semi finals

- India 0–36 Japan
- Singapore 17–12 Hong Kong

Plate Final

- Hong Kong 19–7 India

Final

- Singapore 0–14 Japan

=== Asian Games ===
- Venue: Guangzhou, China, 21–23 November 2010
- Winner: Kazakhstan
- Participants: China, Hong Kong, India, Japan, Kazakhstan, South Korea, Singapore, Thailand

=== Malta v Tunisia ===
- Venue: Unknown, 10 November 2010
- Malta 5–19 Tunisia

=== F-EN League ===
- At: Various, September – November 2010
- Competitors: Austria, Croatia, Hungary, Serbia
- Winner: Hungary

=== Dubai Sevens ===
- At: Dubai, 2–3 December 2010. A tournament "for women's teams who play rugby regularly at an international/county/provincial standard". The official status of some teams is unclear.
- Participants: 16 teams, including three official national selections and one team that was, in effect, the national side but not an "official" team: Brazil, France, Almaty-Kazakhstan, Kenya

== 2011 ==
=== South American Championship ===
- Venue: Bento Gonçalves, Rio Grande do Sul, Brazil. 5–6–7 February 2011
- Winner: Brazil
- Participants: Brazil, Chile, Uruguay, Peru, Venezuela, Colombia, Argentina, Paraguay

=== USA Tournament ===
- Venue: Las Vegas. 11–13 February 2011
- Winner: Canada
- Participants: Canada, France, Kenya, Maple Leafs, Netherlands, Spain, Tyrolian Select, United States

=== Hong Kong Sevens ===
- Venue: Hong Kong. 25 March 2011
- Winner: Canada
- Participants: Canada, China, Chinese Taipei, France, Hong Kong, Japan, Netherlands, Philippines, Russia, United States

=== CAR North ===
- Venue: Senegal, 23–24 April 2011.
- Winner: Tunisia
- Participants: Senegal, Tunisia, Morocco, Cameroon, Burkina Faso, Egypt, Niger, Nigeria

=== F-EN League ===
- At: Zagreb, 9 April 2011
- Competitors: Austria, Croatia, Hungary, Slovenia
- Winner: Hungary

=== Emerging Nations Camp ===
- At: Zanka, Hungary, 23–24 April 2011
- Competitors: Austria, Czech Republic, Denmark, Finland, Hungary, Luxembourg, Poland, Slovakia, Crovenia (Slovenia & Croatia), Nada Split
- Winner: Czech Republic

=== St Lucia v Guadeloupe ===
- At Corinth Playing Field, St Lucia
- St.Lucia 28–10 Guadeloupe
- St.Lucia 40–0 Guadeloupe

=== F-EN League ===
- At: Vienna, 19 May 2011
- Competitors: Austria, Hungary
- Winner: Not known

=== Amsterdam Sevens ===
- Venue: Amsterdam, 21–22 May 2011.
- Winner: Canada
- Participants: Various club and invitational sides, plus Belgium, Brazil, Canada, Georgia, Italy, Netherlands, Spain, Italy, Poland Portugal

=== Portugal v Brazil ===
- Venue: National Stadium, Lisbon, 25 May 2011
- Portugal 24–5 Brazil

=== Roma Sevens ===
- Venue: Rome, 3–4 June 2011.
- Winner:"Red&Blu" Aoteaora Maori
- Participants:Brazil, France, Spain, Italy, Netherlands, Germany, "Red&Blu" Aoteaora Maori, Kusa

=== ScrumQueens.com Elite Sevens ===
- Venue: Richmond, London. 4 June 2011
- Winner: Wooden Spoon
- Participants: England, Sweden, and club and invitational teams

Pool A

- England 33–5 Pink Baa-Baas
- England 35–0 Saracens
- England 0–22 Wooden Spoons

Pool B

- Sweden 19–10 Worcester
- Richmond 5–10 Sweden
- Akuma Dragons 5–19 Sweden

Semi-final

- England 27–0 Sweden

Final

- England 7–14 Wooden Spoons

=== FIRA-AER European Tournament – Division 3 ===
- Venue: 4–5 June 2011, Zanka, Hungary
- Winner: Poland
- Participants: Denmark, Bosnia and Herzegovina, Georgia, Hungary, Slovenia, Serbia, Poland, Lithuania, Luxembourg

=== La Réunion Sevens ===
- Venue La Réunion, 25–26 June 2011
- Winner: Tukkies
- International participants: France, Réunion, New Caledonia, Mayotte, Madagascar, Uganda

Pool A

- France 45–0 Réunion
- Tukkies 41–0 New Caledonia
- France 24–7 New Caledonia
- Tukkies 36–0 Réunion
- New Caledonia 26–17 Réunion
- France 7–24 Tukkies

Pool B

- Uganda 67–0 Mayotte
- Marine 5–0 Madagascar
- Uganda 17–7 Madagascar
- Marine 34–0 Mayotte
- Madagascar 55–0 Mayotte
- Uganda 38–0 Marine

Plate semi-finals

- New Caledonia 47–0 Mayotte
- Madagascar 30–0 Réunion

Plate final

- Madagascar 62–7 New Caledonia

Semi-finals

- Tukkies 14–0 Marine
- France 17–14 Uganda

Final

- Tukkies 12–10 France

=== FIRA-AER European Tournament – Division 2 ===
- Venue: 2–3 July 2011, Riga, Latvia
- Winner: Ukraine
- Participants: Belgium, Austria, Andorra, Croatia, Bulgaria, Switzerland, Czech Republic, Latvia, Malta, Israel, Ukraine, Norway,

=== FIRA-AER Tournament 2010 – Top 12 ===
- Venue: 16–17 July 2011, Bucharest, Romania
- Winner: England
- Participants: England, Finland, France, Germany, Italy, Moldova, Netherlands, Portugal, Romania, Russia, Spain, Sweden

=== Prague Sevens ===
- Venue: Prague, 13–14 August 2011
- Winner: Eccose Feminin (Int)
- Participants: Eccose Feminin (Int), RK Petrovice (CZ), Czech Republic, Austria, Lazybugs (CZ)

Only international fixture: Czech Republic 7–31 Austria

=== Shanghai Sevens ===
- Venue: Shanghai, 27–28 August 2011.
- Winner: China
- Participants: China, Hong Kong, Kazakhstan, Thailand

Pool

- China 24–0 Hong Kong
- Kazakhstan 31–10 Thailand
- China 26–7 Thailand
- Kazakhstan 17–5 Hong Kong
- China 31–10 Kazakhstan
- Thailand 24–5 Hong Kong

Semi-finals

- China 34–0 Hong Kong
- Kazakhstan 7–0 Thailand

Third place

- Thailand 14–10 Hong Kong

Final

- China 19–10 Kazakhstan

=== Castle Sevens ===
- Venue: Lusaka, 27–28 August 2011
- Winner:
- Participants: Botswana, Zambia A, Zambia B, Zimbabwe.

Pool

- Zambia A 14 – 12 Botswana
- Zambia B 0 – 50 Zimbabwe
- Zambia A 14 – 19 Zimbabwe
- Botswana 29 – 0 Zambia B
- Zambia A 50 – 0 Zambia B
- Botswana lost to Zimbabwe

Final

- Zambia A 12–7 Zimbabwe

=== Pacific Games ===
- Venue: New Caledonia, 30–31 August 2011.
- Winner: Fiji
- Participants: Tahiti, Samoa, Fiji, Wallis and Futuna, Guam, Papua New Guinea, Tonga, Cook Islands, New Caledonia, Vanuatu

=== Piotrowice Nyskie International Rugby Festival ===
- Venue: Piotrowice Nyskie, 3–4 September 2011
- Final rankings:1st:Romania, 2nd: Gdańsk, 3rd: Poland B, Czech Republic, Poland A, Silesia.
- Known results:
- Czech Rep. 19–5 Poland A
- Czech Rep. 7–17 Poland B
- Czech Rep. 5–24 Romania
- Czech Rep. 5–17 Gdańsk
- Friendly matches (outside tournament): Czech Rep. 21–5 Romania. Czech also beat Poland A and Poland B (scores unknown)

=== Asia Pacific Sevens ===
- Venue: Kota Kinabalu, Borneo, 23–25 September 2011
- Winner: Papua New Guinea
- Participants: China Cook Islands, Hong Kong,Malaysia Papua New Guinea, Samoa, Singapore, Tonga

=== Asian Championship ===
- Venue: Pune, India. 1–2 October 2011
- Winner: China
- Participants: China, Taiwan, Kazakhstan, South Korea, Hong Kong, India, Iran, Japan, Laos, Malaysia, Hong Kong, Thailand, Singapore

=== Friendly Cup (Coupe de l'Amitié) ===
- Venue: Lviv, Ukraine, 1 October 2010
- Winner: Ukraine
- Participants: 1st Ukraine; 2nd Ukrainian Club Selection; 3rd Hungary, 4th Moldova, 5th Poland, 6th Lithuania. Also participated: Gallícia

Only limited details available:

- Ukraine beat Moldova
- Ukraine beat Poland
- Ukraine Clubs 19–0 Hungary
- Gallícia 5–10 Hungary
- Ukraine 61–0 Hungary
- Moldova 5–12 Hungary

=== CAR South ===
- Venue: Botswana, 29–30 October 2011.
- Winner: South Africa
- Participants: Botswana, South Africa, Kenya, Uganda, Rwanda, Zambia, Zimbabwe, Madagascar

=== Torneo Internacional de Elche ===
- Venue: Elche, Spain 1 November 2011.
- Winner: Spain
- Participants: Spain, France, Netherlands, Portugal

Pool

- Spain 12–12 France
- Netherlands 35–7 Portugal
- Spain 12–10 Netherlands
- France 21–7 Portugal
- Netherlands 17–0 France
- Spain 21–10 Portugal

Nation	Won	Drawn	Lost	For	Against
Spain	2	1	0	45	32
Netherlands	2	0	1	62	19
France	1	1	1	33	36
Portugal	0	0	3	34	77

3rd/4th

- France 14–0 Portugal

Final

- Spain 26–10 Netherlands

=== Singapore Cricket Club International Rugby 7s Tournament ===
- Venue: Singapore 4–5 November 2011.
- Winner: Singapore
- Participants: Indonesia, Malaysia, Singapore, Singapore Barbarians

Pool matches

- Singapore 21–0 Malaysia
- Singapore 21–0 Singapore Barbarians
- Singapore 41–0 Indonesia
- Singapore Barbarians 22–0 Malaysia
- Singapore Barbarians 17–0 Indonesia
- Indonesia 0–0 Malaysia

Semi-Finals

- Singapore 55–0 Indonesia
- Singapore Barbarians 10–5 Malaysia (or 12–5?)

3rd Place (Plate)

- Malaysia 7–5 Indonesia

Final

- Singapore 33–0 Singapore Barbarians

=== Safaricom Sevens ===
- Venue: Nyayo National Stadium, Kenya 5–6 November 2011.
- Winner: Kenya
- Participants: Kenya, Kenya B, Uganda, Uganda B
- Kenya 24–0 Uganda B
- Uganda 29–0 Kenya B
- Kenya 41–5 Kenya B
- Uganda 45–0 Uganda B
- Uganda B 27–5 Kenya B
- Kenya 10–10 Uganda

Final

- Kenya 7–5 Uganda

=== NACRA Sevens Championship ===
- Venue: Bridgetown, Barbados. 12–13 November 2011
- Winner: Canadian Maple Leafs
- Participants: Barbados, Canadian Maple Leafs, Cayman Islands, Guadeloupe, Guyana, Jamaica, Mexico, Saint Lucia, Saint Vincent and the Grenadines, Trinidad and Tobago, USA South

=== IRB Women's Sevens Challenge Cup ===
- Venue: Dubai, UAE. 2–3 December 2011
- Winner: Canada
- Participants: Australia, Brazil, Canada, China, England, South Africa, Spain, United States

=== Dubai Women's International Inivitational ===
- Venue: Dubai, UAE. 2–3 December 2011
- Winner: Netherlands
- Participants: France, Kenya,Netherlands, Maple Leafs, Moscow Region, Iron Ladies, (South Africa) Tuks, Team Globaleye

== 2012 ==
=== Spain v Netherlands ===
- Venue: Madrid, 17–18 January 2012
- Six matches over two days, all won by Spain.
- Known results: Spain 21–17 Netherlands; Spain 33–5 Netherlands; Spain 20–5 Netherlands

=== Martinique Sevens ===
- Venue: Martinique, 4 February 2012
- Two separate tournaments:

Tournoi Guyane-Antilles

- Full results not published. In the final Guadeloupe beat French Guiana in sudden death overtime after a 5–5 draw. Martinique also took part.

International women's tournament:

- Result: 1. France B; 2. France A; 3. Trinidad & Tobago; 4. Saint Lucia
- France A 43–0 Saint Lucia
- France B 36–0 Trinidad & Tobago
- France A 31–0 Trinidad & Tobago
- France B 31–0 Saint Lucia
- Trinidad & Tobago w/o Saint Lucia (Saint Lucia forfeit)
- France B 24–19 France A

=== USA Tournament ===
- Venue: Las Vegas. 11–12 February 2012
- Winner: Canada
- Participants: Brazil, Canada, France, Japan, Maple Leafs (Canada A), Netherlands, Stars & Stripes (USA A), United States

=== Portugal v Spain ===
- Venue: Lisbon, 29 February 2012
- Portugal 0 Spain 38; Portugal 0 Spain 31; Portugal 0 Spain 19; Portugal 0 Spain 22; Portugal 5 Spain 25

=== Netherlands in Botswana & South Africa ===
- Venue: Port Elizabeth, 5–19 March 2012
- Known results: South Africa 7, Netherlands 28

=== Swiss International tournament ===
- Venue: Allmend, Lucerne, 10–11 March 2012
- Results:

Day one

- France II 36–0 Germany
- Switzerland 0–36 France
- Germany 0–52 France
- France II 33–0 Switzerland
- Switzerland 7–36 Germany
- France 14–12 France II

Day two

- France 12–14 France II
- Switzerland 0–43 France
- France II 10–7 Germany
- France 50–7 Germany
- France II 33–5 Switzerland
- Switzerland 7–24 Germany

=== South American Championship ===
- Venue: Rio de Janeiro, Brazil. 10–11 March 2012
- Winner: Brazil
- Participants: Brazil, Chile, Uruguay, Peru, Venezuela, Colombia, Argentina, Paraguay

=== IRB Women's Challenge (Hong Kong) ===
- Venue: Hong Kong. 23–24 March 2012
- Winner: England
- Participants: Australia, Brazil, Canada, China, England, Hong Kong, Japan, Netherlands,Russia, Spain, Tunisia, United States

=== European Emerging Nations ===
- Venue: Zanka, Hungary. 8–9 April 2012
- Winner: Romania
- Participants: Austria, Barbarians, Bulgaria, Croatia, Czech Republic, Hungary, Poland, Poland II, Romania, Slovakia

=== St Lucia triangular ===
- Venue: Gros Islet Playing Field, St Lucia 28 April 2012
- St Lucia 55 – 0 Curaçao
- St Lucia 38 – 0 Curaçao
- Barbados 15 – 5 Curaçao
- Barbados 10 – 5 Curaçao

=== IRB Challenge: London Sevens ===
- Venue: Twickenham, London 12–13 May 2012
- Winner: England
- Participants: Australia, Brazil, Canada, China, England, France, Kazakhstan, Netherlands, Portugal, Russia, South Africa, United States

=== Roma Sevens ===
- Venue: Rome, 18–19 May 2012.
- Winner:"Red&Blu" Aoteaora Maori
- Participants:Georgia, Italy, Kazakhstan, "Red&Blu" Aoteaora Maori, Russia, Tukkies, Ukraine

=== Amsterdam Sevens ===
- Venue: Amsterdam, 19–20 May 2012.

Silver Pier

- Winner: Canada
- Participants: Australia, Canada, England, France, Germany, Ireland,Netherlands, Scotland, South Africa, Spain, United States, Wales

Women's shield

- Winner: Netherlands Development
- Participants: Austria, Finland, Poland, Switzerland plus various club teams

=== Benidorm Sevens ===
- Venue: Benidorm, Spain. 25–26 May 2012
- Winner:Spain
- Participants: Kazakhstan, Russia, Spain

- Spain 26–0 Kazakhstan
- Spain 15–17 Russia
- Russia beat Kazakhstan
- Spain 24–0 Kazakhstan
- Spain 17–20 Russia
- Russia beat Kazakhstan
- Spain 24–14 Kazakhstan
- Russia 26–10 Kazakhstan
- Spain 26–10 Russia
- Final: Spain 19–10 Russia

=== European World Cup Qualifier: Group A ===
- Venue: Sofia, Bulgaria. 9–10 June 2012
- Winner:
- Participants: Andorra, Austria, Bosnia and Herzegovina, Bulgaria, Croatia, Denmark, Hungary, Latvia, Lithuania, Romania, Slovakia, Wales

=== European World Cup Qualifier: Group B ===
- Venue: Gent, Belgium. 9–10 June 2012
- Winner:
- Participants: Belgium, Czech Republic, Finland, Georgia, Ireland, Israel, Luxembourg, Malta, Norway, Poland, Scotland, Serbia

=== European Women's Sevens Series: Round 1 ===
- Venue: Ameland, Netherlands. 16–17 June 2012
- Winner: England
- Participants: England, France, Germany, Italy, Moldova, Netherlands, Portugal, Russia, Spain, Sweden, Switzerland, Ukraine

=== European Women's Sevens Series: Round 2 and WC Qualifier ===
- Venue: Moscow. 30 – June 2012
- Winner: England
- Participants: Croatia; England, France, Germany, Ireland; Italy, Moldova, Netherlands, Portugal, Russia, Scotland; Spain, Sweden, Switzerland, Ukraine;Wales

=== Harare Sevens ===
- At: Harare, Zimbabwe, 28 July 2012
- Zimbabwe A 0–47 Zambia
- Zimbabwe 15–12 Zambia

=== Oceania World Cup Qualifier ===
- At: Fiji, 3–4 August 2012
- Winner: New Zealand.
- Participants: Australia, Cook Islands, Fiji, New Zealand, Papua New Guinea, Solomon Islands, Samoa, Tonga

=== Prague Sevens ===
- Venue: Prague, 11–12 August 2012

Only international: Austria 19–12 Czech Republic

=== Piotrowice Nyskie International Rugby Festival ===
- Venue: Piotrowice Nyskie, 25–26 August 2012 (Source: FIRA)
- Winner: Czech Republic
- Participants Austria, Czech Republic plus club teams.

No international fixtures. Austria finished third.

=== NACRA World Cup Qualifier ===
- At: Ottawa, 25–26 August 2012
- Winner: Canada
- Participants: Canada, Cayman Islands, Mexico, Jamaica, Trinidad and Tobago

=== Asia Pacific Sevens ===
- Venue: Kota Kinabalu, Borneo, 31 – August 2012
- Winner: Australia
- Participants: Australia, China, Hong Kong,Japan, Kazakhstan, South Korea Papua New Guinea, Singapore, Taiwan Thailand

=== Shanghai Sevens ===
- Venue: Shanghai, China, 22–23 September 2012
- Winner: China
- Participants: China, Hong Kong, Shanghai Select, Singapore

International results:

- China 31–0 Hong Kong
- China 38–0 Singapore
- Hong Kong 29–0 Singapore
- (Final): China 31–0 Hong Kong

=== Safari Sevens 2012 ===
- Venue: Middelburg, South Africa
- Winner: Zimbabwe
- Participants: Botswana, Free State, Zimbabwe

International results:

- Botswana 5–15 Zimbabwe

=== African World Cup Qualifier ===
- Venue: Rabat, Morocco, 29–30 September 2012
- Winner: Tunisia
- Participants: Kenya, Morocco, Tunisia, Uganda, Zambia Zimbabwe

=== Asian World Cup Qualifier ===
- Venue: Pune, India, 6–7 October 2012
- Winner: Fiji
- Participants: China, Fiji, Hong Kong, India, Iran, Japan, Kazakhstan, South Korea, Malaysia, Philippines, Sri Lanka, Taiwan, Thailand, Singapore, United Arab Emirates, Uzbekistan

=== Tournoi International rugby 7 féminin ===
- Venue: Marcoussis, Paris, 12–13 October 2012
- Germany 0–40 France A
- England 22–5 Spain
- France 5–17 Netherlands
- England 19–5 France A
- Germany 7–26 Netherlands
- Spain 0–14 France
- England 24–5 Netherlands
- Spain 14–7 France A
- Germany 0–31 France
- Netherlands 12–14 Spain
- England 42–0 Germany
- France A 0–20 France
- Germany 0–24 Spain
- France A 5–12 Netherlands
- England 21–5 France

Nation	Won	Drawn	Lost	For	Against
England	5	0	0	128	20
France	3	0	2	75	38
Netherlands	3	0	2	72	55
Spain	3	0	2	47	55
France A	1	0	3	52	53
Germany	0	0	5	7	163

Bowl

- France A 26–5 Germany

Plate

- Netherlands 14–12 Spain

Cup

- England 19–14 France

=== Guangzhou Sevens ===
- Venue: Guangzhou, China 27–28 October 2012
- Winner: United States

Group A

- China 53–0 Philippines
- Singapore 0 – 59 USA
- China 53 – 0 Singapore
- Philippines 0 – 52 USA
- China 5 – 36 USA
- Philippines 24 – 5 Singapore

Nation	Won	Drawn	Lost	For	Against
USA	3	0	0	147	5
China	2	0	1	111	36
Philippines	1	0	2	24	116
Singapore	0	0	5	24	129

Quarter-finals

- USA 45–0 Thailand
- Kazakhstan beat Philippines
- South Africa beat Singapore
- China 7–10 China II

Plate Semi-finals

- Philippines 24–0 Thailand
- China 60–0 Singapore

Semi finals

- USA 33–7 Kazakhstan
- South Africa 29–7 China II

Group B

- Kazakhstan 48 – 0 Thailand
- China II 7–33 South Africa
- Kazakh-stan 17 – 0 China II
- Thailand 0 – 53 South Africa
- Kazakhstan 10 – 28 South Africa
- Thailand 0 – 54 China II

Nation	Won	Drawn	Lost	For	Against
South Africa	3	0	0	114	12
Kazakhstan	2	0	1	75	28
China II	1	0	2	61	50
Thailand	0	0	3	0	155

7th–8th place

- Thailand 26–5 Singapore

Plate final (5th–6th)

- China 62–0 Philippines

3rd–4th place

- Kazakhstan 12–0 China II

Final

- USA 24–0 South Africa

=== Valencia Sevens ===
- Venue: Valencia, Spain
- Spain 17–12 Russia
- Spain 27–0 Russia
- Spain 21–15 Russia

=== IRB Women's Sevens World Series ===
- Venue: Dubai, UAE. 30 – November 2012
- Winner: New Zealand
- Participants: Australia, Brazil, Canada, China, England, France, Netherlands, New Zealand, South Africa, Spain, United States

=== Dubai Sevens Women's Invitational Tournament ===
- Venue: Dubai, UAE. 29 – November 2012
- Winner: Maple Leafs
- Participants: Maple Leafs; Kenya Lionesses; Swedish Vikings; United Arab Emirates

=== Seven de la Republica ===
- Venue: Paranà, Argentina. 29 – November 2012
- Final classification: 1 Argentina, 2 Uruguay, 3 Chile, 4 Paraguay
- Argentina 17–5 Chile
- Uruguay 31–0 Paraguay
- Argentina 41–0 Paraguay
- Uruguay 25–0 Chile
- Chile 12–10 Paraguay
- Argentina 19–5 Uruguay

=== Havana Sevens ===
- Venue: Havana, Cuba. 29 – November 2012
- Winner: Dog Howlers
- Participants: Dog Howlers, Atlantis, Venezuela, Cayman Islands Selects, Cuba

No results known. Cuba beaten in the final.

=== Guatemala exhibition ===
- Venue: Guatemala. 1 December 2012
- Guatemala 5–10 Costa Rica B
- Costa Rica A 29–0 El Salvador
- Costa Rica A 33–0 Guatemala
- Costa Rica B 27–0 El Salvador
- Guatemala 10–5 El Salvador

== 2013 ==
=== Women's Sevens World Series (USA) ===
- Venue: BBVA Compass Stadium, Houston. 1–2 February 2013
- Winner: England
- Participants: Argentina, Australia, Brazil, Canada, England, Japan, Netherlands, New Zealand, Russia, South Africa, Trinidad and Tobago, United States

=== Spain v France ===
- Venue: Gijón 2–3 February 2013

A joint training camp, with two internationals being played:

- Spain 19–22 France
- Spain 26–22 France

=== USA Sevens ===
- Venue: Las Vegas. 8–9 February 2013
- Winner: Maple Leafs 1
- Participants: Argentina, Japan, Maple Leafs 1 and 2, USA Stars and USA Stripes, and various club selections.

=== South American Championship and World Cup qualifier ===
- Venue: Rio de Janeiro, Brazil. 23–24 February 2013
- Winner:
- Participants: Brazil, Chile, Uruguay, Peru, Venezuela, Colombia, Argentina, Paraguay

=== Alicante Sevens ===
- Venue: Alicante, Spain. 14 March 2013

Group A

- France 12–0 Germany
- Germany 7–17 Russia A
- France 12–5 Russia A.

Semi-finals

- France 24–10 Russia B
- Spain 0–29 Russia A

5th/6th place

- Germany 31–0 Tunisia

Group B

- Spain 26–5 Tunisia
- Russia B 32–5 Tunisia
- Russia B 17–0 Spain

3rd/4th place

- Russia B 0–43 Spain

Final

- France 7–38 Russia A

=== Hong Kong ===
- Venue: Hong Kong. 22 March 2013
- Winner: Canada
- Participants: Australia, Canada, China, France, Hong Kong, International Select, Ireland, Japan, Kazakhstan, Netherlands, South Africa, Singapore, United States

=== IRB Women's Sevens World Series: China ===
- Venue: Guangzhou University City Stadium, Guangzhou, China 30–31 March 2013
- Winner: New Zealand
- Participants: Australia, Canada, China, Fiji, Brazil, England, Ireland, Japan, Ireland, Netherlands, Japan, Tunisia, United States

=== African Sevens ===
- Venue: Tunis. 20–21 April 2013
- Winner: South Africa
- Participants: Kenya, Senegal, South Africa, Tunisia, Uganda, Zimbabwe

=== London Sevens ===
- Venue: Twickenham 11–12 May 2013
- Winner: England
- Participants: Australia, Canada, England, France, Ireland, Russia, Spain, United States

=== Amsterdam Sevens ===
IRB Women's Sevens World Series

- Venue: NRCA Stadium, Amsterdam, 17–18 May 2013.
- Winner: New Zealand
- Participants: Australia, Brazil, Canada, China, England, France, New Zealand, Russia, Netherlands, Spain, South Africa, United States

Women's Shield

- Venue: NRCA Stadium, Amsterdam, 18–19 May 2013.
- Winner: Ukraine
- Participants: Belgium, Czech Republic, Georgia, Germany, Switzerland, Ukraine, and various club teams

=== European Championship: Group B ===
- Venue: Bratislava. 25–26 May 2013
- Winner: Finland
- Participants: Bulgaria, Israel, Latvia, Slovakia, Luxembourg, Andorra, Finland, Malta, Norway, Turkey, Lithuania, Bosnia and Herzegovina

=== European Championship Series: Top 12, Round 1 ===
- Venue: Brive. 1–2 June 2013
- Winner: England
- Participants: England, France, Germany, Ireland, Italy, Netherlands, Portugal, Russia, Scotland, Spain, Ukraine, Wales

=== European Championship: Group A ===
- Venue: Prague. 8–9 June 2013
- Winner: Belgium
- Participants: Austria, Belgium, Croatia, Czech Republic, Denmark, Georgia, Hungary, Moldova, Poland, Romania, Sweden, Switzerland

=== European Championship Series: Top 12, Round 2 ===
- Venue: Marbella. 15–16 June 2013
- Winner: Russia
- Participants: England, France, Germany, Ireland, Italy, Netherlands, Portugal, Russia, Scotland, Spain, Ukraine, Wales

=== IRB Sevens World Cup ===
- At: Moscow, 28–29 June 2013
- Winner: New Zealand
- Participants: Australia, Brazil, Canada, China, England, Fiji, France, Ireland, Japan, New Zealand, Netherlands, Russia, South Africa, Spain, Tunisia, United States

=== Asian Championship Round 1 ===
- At: Baeng Sen, Thailand, 20–21 September 2013
- Winner: China
- Participants: China, Chinese Taipei, Guam, Philippines, Laos, Kazakhstan, Singapore, Japan, South Korea, Hong Kong, Sri Lanka, Thailand

=== Middelburg Sevens ===
- At Middelburg, South Africa
- Winner: Zimbabwe

Mainly club teams. Only internationals:

- Botswana 0–29 Zimbabwe
- Botswana 5–17 Zimbabwe

=== Belgium v Netherlands ===
- 5 October 2013

Three training games, all won by Netherlands

=== Oceania Championship ===
- At: Noose, Australia 5–6 October 2013
- Winner: Australia.
- Participants: Australia, Fiji, New Zealand, Papua New Guinea, Samoa

=== Germany v Netherlands ===
- 12 October 2013

Four training games:

- Netherlands 50–0 Germany
- Netherlands 12–5 Germany
- Netherlands 27–0 Germany
- Netherlands 12–0 Germany

=== Asian Championship Round 2 ===
- At: Pune, India, 9–10 November 2013
- Winner: China
- Participants: China, Iran, India, Philippines, Laos, Kazakhstan, Singapore, Japan, United Arab Emirates, Hong Kong, Thailand

=== Valentine Martinez ===
- Venue: Montevideo, Uruguay. 9–10 November 2013
- Winner: Brazil
- Participants: Argentina, Brazil, Chile, Uruguay

=== NACRA Championship ===
- At: Ottawa, 25–26 August 2012
- Winner: Maple Leafs
- Participants: Bermuda, Maple Leafs, Cayman Islands, Curaçao, Jamaica, Mexico, Jamaica, Trinidad and Tobago; Turks and Caicos Islands

=== Souston Sevens ===
- At Souston, France, 10 November 2013

POOL 1

Nation	Won	Drawn	Lost	For	Against
England	3	0	0	76	0
French Universities	2	0	1	78	21
Germany	1	0	2	45	50
Netherlands A	0	0	3	5	62

- England 21–0 French Universities
- Netherlands A 5–12 Germany
- England 38–0 Germany
- Netherlands A 0–33 French Universities
- England 17–0 Netherlands A
- Germany 0–45 French Universities

7th Place

- Netherlands A 40–0 Tunisia

5th Place

- Germany 0–33 Ireland

POOL 2

Nation	Won	Drawn	Lost	For	Against
France	3	0	0	70	14
Netherlands 1	2	0	1	78	31
Ireland	1	0	2	38	46
Tunisia	0	0	3	5	100

- France 22–0 Tunisia
- Ireland 0–24 Netherlands 1
- France 26–7 Netherlands 1
- Ireland 31–0 Tunisia
- France 22–7 Ireland
- Netherlands 1 47–5 Tunisia

3rd Place

- French Universities 0–12 Netherlands 1

Final

- France 29–17 England

=== Bolivarian Games ===
- Venue: Chiclayo, Peru. 15–17 November 2013
- Winner: Colombia
- Participants: Colombia, Ecuador, Peru, Venezuela

=== IRB Women's Sevens World Series ===
- Venue: Dubai, UAE. 28–29 November 2013
- Winner: New Zealand
- Participants: Australia, Brazil, Canada, England, Ireland, France, New Zealand, Tunisia, Fiji, Spain, United States

== 2014 ==
=== Mar del Plata Sevens ===
- Venue: Mar del Plata, Argentina, 11–12 January 2014
- Uruguay 14–5 Paraguay
- Argentina 22–5 Chile
- Uruguay 38–0 Chile
- Argentina 17–5 Paraguay
- Chile 15–12 Paraguay
- Argentina 32–0 Uruguay
- Argentina 22–0 Paraguay (Semi-Final)
- Uruguay 22–0 Chile (Semi-Final)
- Paraguay 10–5 Chile (3rd Place Match)
- Argentina 38–0 Uruguay (Final)

=== Copa Mesoamericana ===
Venue: Guatemala, 25 January 2014

- Guatemala 'B' 0–33 Jalisco (Mexico)
- Guatemala 12–5 El Salvador
- Guatemala 20–7 Jalisco (Mexico)
- Guatemala 'B' 0–36 El Salvador
- Guatemala 41–0 Guatemala 'B'
- El Salvador 10–0 Jalisco (Mexico)

=== Rainforest Sevens ===
- Venue: Cartago, Costa Rica
- Venezuela 46 – El Salvador 7
- Peru 43 – Panamá 0
- Nicarágua 0 – Costa Rica 50
- Venezuela 17 – Peru 22
- Colômbia 52 – El Salvador 7
- Panamá 0 – Costa Rica 54
- Venezuela 54 – Panamá 0
- Peru 45 – Nicarágua 0
- Colômbia 24 – Costa Rica 0
- Nicarágua 20 – Panamá 0
- Costa Rica 26 – El Salvador 5
- Colômbia 27 – Peru 5
- Nicarágua 0 – Venezuela 72
- Colômbia 50 – Panamá 0
- El Salvador 0 – Peru 41
- Costa Rica 0 – Venezuela 27
- Colômbia 82 – Nicaragua 0
- Panamá 0 – El Salvador 20
- Costa Rica 5 – Peru 34
- Colômbia 17 – Venezuela 0
- El Salvador 19 – Nicarágua 5

Final Standing 1 – Colômbia – qualified for Central American and Caribbean Games – Veracruz 2014 2 – Peru (invited) 3 – Venezuela – qualified for Central American and Caribbean Games – Veracruz 2014 4 – Costa Rica 5 – El Salvador 6 – Nicarágua 7 – Panamá

=== Women's Sevens World Series (USA) ===
- Venue: Fifth Third Bank Stadium, Kennesaw, Georgia. 15–16 February 2014
- Winner: New Zealand
- Participants: Australia, Brazil, Canada, China, England, Ireland, Japan, Netherlands, New Zealand, Russia, Spain, United States

=== Women's Sevens World Series (Brazil) ===
- Venue: São Paulo. 21–22 February 2014
- Winner: Australia
- Participants: Argentina, Australia, Brazil, Canada, England, Ireland, Japan, Netherlands, New Zealand, Russia, Spain, United States

=== Athens Sevens ===
- Venue: Athens, 23–24 March 2014
- Winner: Russia
- Israel 24–5 Malta
- Greece 0–41 Russia
- Bulgaria 5–26 Romania
- Israel 26–0 Greece
- Malta 22–10 Bulgaria
- Russia 22–0 Romania
- Greece 5–36 Bulgaria
- Malta 0–17 Romania
- Israel 0–35 Russia
- Greece 0–48 Romania
- Malta 0–35 Russia
- Israel 24–7 Bulgaria
- Malta 43–0 Greece
- Israel 5–17 Romania
- Bulgaria 0–45 Russia

Nation	Won	Drawn	Lost	For	Against
Russia	5	0	0	178	0
Romania	4	0	1	108	32
Israel	3	0	2	79	64
Malta	2	0	3	70	86
Bulgaria	1	0	4	58	122
Greece	0	0	5	5	194

Semi-finals

- Russia 45–0 Israel
- Romania 24–7 Malta

5th/6th place

- Bulgaria 19–7 Greece

3rd/4th place

- Israel 7–12 Malta (AET)

Final

- Russia 39–5 Romania

=== Hong Kong ===
- Venue: Hong Kong. 28 March 2014
- Winner: Canada
- Participants: Brazil, Canada, China, France, Hong Kong, Ireland, Japan, Kazakhstan, Kenya, South Africa, Singapore, Papua New Guinea

=== IRB Women's Sevens World Series: China ===
- Venue: Guangzhou University City Stadium, Guangzhou, China 5–6 April 2013
- Winner: New Zealand
- Participants: Australia, Brazil, Canada, China, England, Ireland, France, New Zealand, Fiji, Spain, United States

=== African Sevens ===
- Venue: 12 April 2014. Machakos, Kenya
- Winner: South Africa
- Participants: Kenya, Namibia, Madagascar, Senegal, South Africa, Tunisia, Uganda, Zimbabwe

=== Stanislas Sevens ===
- Venue: 10–11 May 2014. Meurthe-et-Moselle, France
- Winner: Brazil development
- Internationals: Czech Republic 36–5 Georgia; Brazil Development 55–0 Belgium; Czech Republic 22–5 Switzerland; Switzerland 14–5 Georgia

=== Amsterdam Sevens ===
IRB Women's Sevens World Series

- Venue: NRCA Stadium, Amsterdam, 16–17 May 2014.
- Winner: New Zealand
- Participants: Australia, Brazil, Canada, England, France, Ireland, New Zealand, Russia, Netherlands, Spain, South Africa, United States

Women's Shield

- Venue: NRCA Stadium, Amsterdam, 17–18 May 2014.
- Winner: Tribe (Aus/Eng/Malta)
- Participants: Germany, Georgia, Norway, Switzerland, Poland, Wales, and various club teams

=== Centrale Sevens ===
- Venue: Ecole Centrale Paris
- Winner: Tribe (Aus/Eng/Malta)
- Internationals: Brazil Development 15–5 Tunisia; Ukraine 12–19 Germany; Belgium 0–36 Germany; Ukraine 28–10 Belgium; Ukraine 5–14 Tunisia; Germany 24–19 Brazil Development; Belgium 0–40 Tunisia

=== European Championship Series: Top 12, Round 1 ===
- Venue: Moscow. 6–7 June 2013
- Winner: England
- Participants: England, France, Germany, Ireland, Italy, Netherlands, Portugal, Russia, Belgium, Spain, Sweden, Wales

=== European Championship: Group A ===
- Venue: Bergen. 7–8 June 2014
- Winner: Ukraine
- Participants: Norway, Croatia, Czech Republic, Denmark, Georgia, Hungary, Moldova, Poland, Romania, Scotland, Ukraine, Croatia

=== European Championship Series: Top 12, Round 2 ===
- Venue: Brive. 14–15 June 2014
- Winner: France
- Participants: England, France, Germany, Ireland, Italy, Netherlands, Portugal, Russia, Belgium, Spain, Sweden, Wales

=== European Championship: Group B ===
- Venue: Vilnius. 30 June 2014
- Winner: Hungary
- Participants: Austria, Bulgaria, Israel, Latvia, Slovenia, Luxembourg, Malta, Bulgaria, Serbia, Lithuania, Bosnia and Herzegovina

=== Asian Championship Round 1 ===
- At: Hong Kong, 22–23 August 2014
- Winner: China
- Participants: China, Philippines, Kazakhstan, Singapore, Japan, South Korea, Hong Kong, Sri Lanka, Thailand

=== IRB Women's Sevens World Series Qualifier ===
- Venue: Shek Kip Mei Sports Ground, Hong Kong, 12–13 September 2014
- Winner: Fiji
- Other core team qualifiers: France, China, South Africa
- Participants: Argentina, Brazil, China, Fiji, France, Hong Kong, Japan, Kenya, Mexico, Netherlands, Portugal, South Africa

Group A

Nation	Won	Drawn	Lost	For	Against
Fiji	3	0	0	130	14
Japan	2	0	1	73	33
Argentina	1	0	2	26	92
Kenya	0	0	3	5	95

- Fiji 52–7 Argentina
- Japan 31–0 Kenya
- Fiji 45–0 Kenya
- Japan 35–0 Argentina
- Fiji 33–7 Japan
- Argentina 19–5 Kenya

Group B

Nation	Won	Drawn	Lost	For	Against
France	2	0	1	111	19
China	2	0	1	82	33
South Africa	2	0	1	64	50
Mexico	0	0	3	0	146

- France 19–21 South Africa
- China 44–0 Mexico
- France 66–0 Mexico
- China 31–7 South Africa
- France 26–7 China
- South Africa 36–0 Mexico

Plate Semi Finals (5th–8th)

- Japan 13–5 Netherlands
- Portugal 0–10 Brazil

7th/8th Match

- Portugal 7–31 Netherlands

Plate final: 5th/6th Match

- Brazil 7–38 Japan

Group C

Nation	Won	Drawn	Lost	For	Against
Netherlands	3	0	0	33	10
Brazil	2	0	1	60	14
Portugal	1	0	2	33	61
Hong Kong	0	0	3	29	60

- Brazil 38–7 Portugal
- Netherlands 12–10 Hong Kong
- Brazil 22–0 Hong Kong
- Netherlands 14–0 Portugal
- Brazil 0–7 Netherlands
- Portugal 26–19 Hong Kong

Bowl Semi Finals (9th–12th)

- Argentina 34–7 Mexico
- Hong Kong 14–12 Kenya

11th/12th Match

- Mexico 0–55 Kenya

Bowl final:9th/10th Match

- Argentina 7–26 Hong Kong

Quarter-finals (1st–8th)

- Fiji 28–7 Portugal
- China 45–7 Brazil
- France 21–12 Japan
- Netherlands 7–22 South Africa

Cup Semi Finals (1st–4th)

- Fiji 21–19 China
- France 14–5 South Africa

3rd/4th place

- China 12–7 South Africa

Cup Final: 1st/2nd place

- Fiji 24–19 France

=== European U18 Championship ===
- Venue: Enkoping, Hong Kong, 13–14 September 2014
- Winner: England
- Participants: England, Ireland, Wales, Sweden, Portugal, Belgium, Russia, Italy, Netherlands, Germany

=== Asian Games ===
- At: Incheon, Korea, 30 September – 1 October 2014
- Winner: China
- Participants: China, Uzbekistan, Philippines, Kazakhstan, Singapore, Japan, South Korea, Hong Kong, Malaysia, Thailand, Laos

=== Oceania Championship ===
- At: Noose, Australia 4–5 October 2014
- Winner: New Zealand.
- Participants: Australia, Cook Islands, Fiji, New Zealand, Papua New Guinea, Samoa

=== Asian Championship Round 2 ===
- At: Beijing, 18–19 October 2014
- Winner: Japan
- Participants: China, Philippines, Kazakhstan, Singapore, Japan, South Korea, Hong Kong, Sri Lanka, Thailand

=== Valentine Martinez ===
- Venue: Montevideo, Uruguay. 8–9 November 2014
- Winner: Brazil
- Participants: Argentina, Brazil, Chile, Colombia, Peru, Paraguay, Uruguay, Venezuela

=== Souston Sevens ===
- At Souston, France, 15 November 2014

POOL 1

Nation	Won	Drawn	Lost	For	Against
England Chariot	3	0	0	55*	5*
Ireland	2	0	1	55	36
Spain	1	0	2	26	62
Wales	0	0	3	19*	52*

- England Chariot 31 Spain 0
- Ireland 33 Wales 7
- Wales 12 Spain 19
- England Chariot 24 Ireland 5
- Ireland 17 Spain 7
- England Chariot bt Wales*

7th Place

- Wales bt Tunisia

5th Place

- Spain bt Spain B

POOL 2

Nation	Won	Drawn	Lost	For	Against
France	3	0	0	91	0
England TW3	2	0	1	76	14
Spain B	1	0	2	17	67
Tunisia	0	0	3	12	115

- England TW3 24 Spain B 0
- France 46 Tunisia 0
- France 31 Spain B 0
- Tunisia 0 England TW3 52
- Tunisia 12 Spain B 17
- France 14 England TW3 0

3rd Place

- England TW3 38–7 Ireland

Final

- France 19–17 England Chariots

== 2015 ==
=== Mar del Plata Sevens ===
- Venue: Mar del Plata, Argentina, 10–11 January 2015
- This tournament also acted as South America's qualifier for the 2015 Pan American Games

Day One: Pool A

Nation	Won	Drawn	Lost	For	Against
Argentina	2	0	0	65	5
Chile	1	0	1	17	51
Paraguay	0	0	2	10	36

- Chile 12 Paraguay 10
- Argentina 24 Paraguay 0
- Argentina 41 Chile 5

Pool B

Nation	Won	Drawn	Lost	For	Against
Venezuela	3	0	0	46	22
Columbia	2	0	1	53	17
Uruguay	1	0	2	41	22
Peru	0	0	3	12	91

- Colombia 36 Peru 0
- Venezuela 10 Uruguay 5
- Colombia 5 Venezuela 10
- Uruguay 29 Peru 0
- Colombia 12 Uruguay 7
- Peru 12 Venezuela 26

Day Two: Championship pool (top two qualify for PanAm)

Nation	Won	Drawn	Lost	For	Against
Argentina	3	0	0	61	10
Columbia	2	0	1	32	17
Venezuela	1	0	2	15	36
Chile	0	0	3	5	52

- Argentina 17 Colombia 0
- Venezuela 10 Chile 0
- Argentina 22 Chile 5
- Venezuela 0 Colombia 12
- Chile 0 Colombia 20
- Argentina 22 Venezuela 5

5th/7th play-off pool

Paraguay 38 Peru 5 Paraguay 10 Uruguay 0 Uruguay 26 Peru 7

=== Women's Sevens World Series (Brazil) ===
- Venue: São Paulo. 7–8 February 2015
- Winner: New Zealand
- Participants: Australia, Brazil, Canada, England, France, Fiji, South Africa, New Zealand, Russia, Spain, United States

=== Women's Sevens World Series (USA) ===
- Venue: Atlanta. 14–15 March 2015
- Winner: New Zealand
- Participants: Australia, Brazil, Canada, England, France, Fiji, South Africa, New Zealand, Russia, Spain, United States

=== Women's Sevens World Series (Canada) ===
- Venue: Langford. 18–19 April 2015
- Winner: New Zealand
- Participants: Australia, Brazil, Canada, England, France, Fiji, South Africa, New Zealand, Russia, Spain, United States

=== Pacific Games ===
- Venue: Port Moresby, Papua New Guinea. 8–10 July 2015
- Winner: Fiji
- Participants: Australia, Fiji, New Caledonia, Papua New Guinea, Samoa, Tahiti, Tonga

=== Pan Am Games ===
- Venue: Toronto, Ontario, Canada. 8–10 July 2015
- Winner: Canada
- Participants: Argentina, Brazil, Canada, Colombia, Mexico, United States

=== IRB Women's Sevens World Series Qualifier ===
- Venue: University College Dublin, 22–23 August 2015
- Winner:
- Other core team qualifiers: Ireland, Japan
- Participants: Brazil, China, Hong Kong, Ireland, Japan, Kenya, Mexico, Netherlands, Netherlands, South Africa, Samoa, Wales

Group A

Nation	Won	Drawn	Lost	For	Against
Japan	3	0	0	69	24
Wales	2	0	1	64	29
Brazil	1	0	2	52	41
Samoa	0	0	3	17	108

- Brazil 10–19 Japan
- Wales 33–12 Samoa
- Wales 14–17 Japan
- Brazil 42–5 Samoa
- Japan 33–0 Samoa
- Brazil 0–17 Wales

Group B

Nation	Won	Drawn	Lost	For	Against
Netherlands	3	0	0	77	17
China	2	0	1	65	29
Kenya	1	0	2	26	58
Colombia	0	0	3	7	71

- China 29–7 Kenya
- Netherlands 33–0 Colombia
- Netherlands 22–7 Kenya
- China 26–0 Colombia
- Kenya 12–7 Colombia
- China 10–22 Netherlands

Plate Semi Finals (5th–8th)

- Hong Kong 14–10 China
- Wales 5–10 Brazil

7th/8th Match

- China 7–29 Wales

Plate final: 5th/6th Match

- Hong Kong 0–17 Brazil

Group C

Nation	Won	Drawn	Lost	For	Against
South Africa	3	0	0	87	10
Ireland	2	0	1	119	17
Hong Kong	1	0	2	52	83
Mexico	0	0	3	0	150

- South Africa 33–5 Hong Kong
- Ireland 64–0 Mexico
- Ireland 50–0 Hong Kong
- South Africa 38–0 Mexico
- Hong Kong 48–0 Mexico
- South Africa 17–5 Ireland

Bowl Semi Finals (9th–12th)

- Kenya 31–0 Mexico
- Colombia 12–5 Samoa

11th/12th Match

- Mexico 0–22 Samoa

Bowl final:9th/10th Match

- Kenya 5–0 Colombia

Quarter-finals (1st–8th)

- South Africa 21–5 Hong Kong
- Ireland 27–5 China
- Japan 17–0 Wales
- Netherlands 12–10 Brazil

Cup Semi Finals (1st–4th)

- South Africa 14–26 Ireland
- Japan 10–5 Netherlands

3rd/4th place

- South Africa 12–0 Netherlands

Cup Final: 1st/2nd place

- Ireland 12–13 Japan

=== Elche Sevens ===
- Venue: Elche, 23–24 March 2014
- Winner: Great Britain

Day One

- Great Britain 33–5 Spain
- Portugal 12–19 Ireland
- France 65–0 Alicante
- Spain 50–0 Alicante
- Ireland 07-26 Great Britain
- France 24–0 Portugal
- Spain 24–5 Ireland
- Great Britain 12–19 France
- Alicante 0–61 Portugal

Day Two

- Alicante 78–0 Ireland
- Spain 7–31 France
- Portugal 0–36 Great Britain
- Ireland 0–12 France
- Spain 19–0 Portugal
- Alicante 0–79 Great Britain
- 5th/6th place Portugal 55–0 Alicante
- 3rd/4th place Spain 12–5 Ireland
- Final France 19–35 Great Britain

Nation	Won	Drawn	Lost	For	Against
France	5	0	0	151	19
Great Britain	4	0	1	186	31
Spain	3	0	2	100	64
Ireland	2	0	3	109	71
Portugal	1	0	4	73	98
Alicante	0	0	5	0	272

== Women's Rugby Sevens rankings ==
- unofficial world rankings

Unofficial Women's Seven Rugby World Rankings
November 2013, 25th
Rank	Change*	Team	Points
1	Steady	New Zealand	5574
2	Steady	Canada	5424
3	▲1	United States	5285
4	▼1	Australia	5261
5	Steady	England	5225
6	Steady	Spain	5092
7	Steady	Russia	5077
8	▲2	France	4727
9	Steady	Ireland	4721
10	▼2	Netherlands	4715
11	▲1	Fiji	4714
12	▲2	Japan	4569
13	▼2	China	4568
14	▲1	South Africa	4273
15	▼2	Brazil	4266
16	Steady	Tunisia	3888
17	Steady	Germany	3385
18	Steady	Kazakhstan	3332
19	▼1	Italy	3191
20	▲3	Hong Kong	3134
21	▼1	Portugal	2953
22	▼1	Ukraine	2837
23	▲31	Western Samoa	2818
24	▼2	Wales	2726
25	▼1	Scotland	2655
26	▲5	Papua New Guinea	2630
27	▼1	Singapore	2598
28	▼3	Thailand	2551
29	▼2	Argentina	2456
30	▲11	Belgium	2332
31	▼3	Sweden	2192
32	▼3	Switzerland	2152
33	▼3	Trinidad and Tobago	2123
34	▲5	Chinese Taipei	1903
35	▼3	Moldova	2062
36	▼3	Czech Republic	2012
36	▼3	Croatia	2012
38	▼3	Romania	1969
39	▲13	Philippines	1948
40	▼4	Uganda	1916
41	▼4	Hungary	1909
42	▼4	Poland	1904
43	▲6	United Arab Emirates	1895
44	▼4	Austria	1886
45	▲29	Sri Lanka	1849
46	▼4	Kenya	1795
47	▼4	Georgia	1761
48	▼4	Finland	1750
49	▲1	India	1699
50	▼5	Colombia	1698
51	▼4	Uruguay	1690
52	▼6	Chile	1650
53	▼5	Denmark	1605
54	▲11	South Korea	1570
55	▼4	Norway	1540
56	▲12	Iran	1532
57	▲14	Mexico	1525
58	▼2	Venezuela	1503
59	▼6	Malta	1482
60	▲10	Guatemala	1477
61	▼6	Israel	1472
62	▼5	Latvia	1397
63	▼5	Zimbabwe	1376
64	▼2	Jamaica	1351
65	▼6	Bulgaria	1343
66	▲1	Paraguay	1330
67	▼7	Cook Islands	1286
68	▼7	Malaysia	1252
69	▼6	Andorra	1270
69	▼3	Peru	1270
71	▼7	Slovenia	1252
72	▲9	Laos	1194
73	▲11	Cayman Islands	1165
74	▼5	Lithuania	1162
75	▼3	Senegal	1084
76	▼3	Zambia	1082
77	▼2	Uzbekistan	1014
78	▼2	Luxembourg	1009
79	▼2	Tonga	1004
80	▼2	Bosnia and Herzegovina	948
81	▼2	Saint Lucia	903
82	▼2	Guyana	902
83	▼1	Slovakia	838
84	▼1	Serbia	820
85	Steady	Madagascar	772
86	Steady	Morocco	755
87	Steady	Hawaii	611
88	▲1	Nicaragua	605
89	▲13	Bermuda	549
90	▼2	Botswana	455
91	▼3	Barbados	549
92	▲18	Curaçao	499
93	▼3	Solomon Islands	493
94	▼3	Burkina Faso	455
95	▼2	Guatemala	430
96	▼2	Réunion	418
96	▼2	Saint Vincent and the Grenadines	418
98	▼2	Turkey	404
99	▼2	Mayotte	372
99	▼2	Rwanda	372

== Sources ==
The sources for each individual tournament entry are listed individually above. Most of the information has come from the websites of various nations which has also been contributed to by news reports. If only one source is listed then it should be considered the primary source. The listings are also checked by members of various rugby discussion fora.
