= DRU Superliga =

The DRU Superliga is the highest tier of the national rugby union competition in Denmark.

The Danish First division has 10 clubs in total divided in 2 pools. The clubs that reach the Top 3 from each Division 1 pool (East and West) go through to the Playoffs.

The punctuation system in the Superliga: 4 Points for a win, 2P for a tie and bonus points are given if 4 tries or more are scored and/or if the loser team has a -7 margin.

== Denmark First Div ==
East

| Club | Location |
|---|---|
| Hundested Rugby Klub | Hundested |
| DTU Exiles | Lyngby |
| Frederiksberg Rugby Klub | Frederiksberg |
| RK Speed | Kastrup, Copenhagen |
| CSR/Nanok | Copenhagen |

West

| Club | Location |
|---|---|
| Aalborg RK Lynet | Aalborg |
| Holstebro RK | Holstebro |
| Aarhus Rugby Klub | Aarhus |
| Erritsø Rugby Klub | Fredericia |
| Odder Rugby Klub | Højbjerg, Aarhus |

== 2012 Edition ==
- Holstebro RK
- Aarhus RK
- Erritsø GIF Rugby
- Frederiksberg RK
- RK Speed
- CSR-Nanok

*These are the Top 3 teams of each pool that complete the 2012 DRU Superliga.

== Denmark Second Div ==
The second division is made up with some of the 2nd XV teams of a few of the first division clubs, and others that complete the championship league. Teams such as:

- Lindø/Odense - They are an independent club, with their own junior teams, but have been playing in combination with RC Odense at senior level since 2010.
- Roskilde Vikings RK
- CBS Rugby

== See also ==
- Rugby union in Denmark
