= Denmark national rugby union team =

National rugby union team

Denmark
- Nickname: Danish Lions
- Union: Dansk Rugby Union
- Head coach: Andreas Robertson
- Captain: Mikkel Andresen
First colours

World Rugby ranking
- Current: 57 (as of 10 April 2026)
- Highest: 57 (10 April 2026)
- Lowest: 77 (29 January 2024)

First international
- Sweden 6 – 0 Denmark (Stockholm, Sweden; 23 October 1949)

Biggest win
- Denmark 127 – 5 Estonia (Odense, Denmark; 28 April 2018)

Biggest defeat
- Italy A 102 – 3 Denmark (Brescia, Italy; 1 November 1997)

The Denmark national rugby union team is governed by Danish Rugby Union and has been playing international rugby since 1949.

DRU now has nearly 2,500 members in more than 30 clubs.

The DRU Superliga is the highest tier of the national rugby union competition in Denmark. Most of the national team's players play in the local league, however a handful of them play in amateur clubs in England, Ireland, Sweden and France. There are no professional players that play for Denmark.

The national side is ranked 57th in the world, as of 10th April 2026.

The national side play in Rugby Europe's Trophy division: https://www.rugbyeurope.eu/competitions/season-2526/xv-competitions/mens-trophy-2526. They were promoted to the division in 2025.

== History ==
Rugby Union had been played in Denmark since 1931, but the Danish Rugby Union (DRU) wasn't formed until 1950. The DRU joined the Sports Confederation of Denmark and Rugby Europe in 1971. In 1974, the DRU co-founded the Nordic Rugby Union (now Scandinavian Rugby Union), and in 1988, the DRU joined the International Rugby Board.

The Danish First XV, known as Drusse, participates every year in the European Nation Tournament. In Europe, Denmark is ranked as a second-division side.

Championship tournaments determine seeding for World Cup qualifying pools. Denmark debuted in World Cup competition in October 1992, during qualification for the 1995 Rugby World Cup. They have never qualified for the World Cup, however.

== Overall Record ==
Below is a table of the representative rugby matches played by a Denmark national XV at test level up until 7 November 2026, updated after match with Czech Republic.

Against	Played	Won	Lost	Drawn	Win percentage
Andorra	5	2	2	1	40%
Armenia	2	0	2	0	0%
Austria	9	6	3	0	66.67%
Belgium	8	1	6	1	12.5%
Bulgaria	1	0	1	0	0%
Croatia	6	0	5	1	0%
Czech Republic	4	0	4	0	0%
East Germany	2	0	2	0	0%
Estonia	3	3	0	0	100%
Finland	10	7	3	0	70%
Georgia	1	0	1	0	0%
Germany	6	1	5	0	16.67%
Gibraltar	2	2	0	0	100%
Hungary	5	3	2	0	60%
Israel	5	2	3	0	40%
Italy A	1	0	1	0	0%
Latvia	10	4	6	0	40%
Lithuania	3	3	0	0	100%
Luxembourg	5	2	3	0	40%
Malta	3	1	2	0	33.33%
Moldova	3	1	2	0	33.33%
Morocco	1	0	1	0	0%
Netherlands	10	0	9	1	0%
Norway	23	21	1	1	91.3%
Poland	6	1	5	0	16.67%
Portugal	2	0	2	0	0%
Russia	3	0	3	0	0%
Serbia	6	2	3	1	33.33%
Slovenia	7	2	5	0	28.57%
Spain	1	0	1	0	0%
Sweden	54	10	41	3	18.52%
Switzerland	10	5	3	2	50%
Ukraine	3	1	2	0	33.33%
Yugoslavia	1	0	1	0	0%
West Germany	3	0	3	0	0%
Total	223	81	131	11	36.32%

== Current squad ==
Starting line-up for the 2023-24 Rugby Europe Conference match against Finland.

- Caps & age not updated.
- Head coach: Andreas Robertson
- Managers: Palle Andersen & Ruben Garcia Pedersen
- Assistant coaches: Chris Adby & Rich Groom
- Head Physio: August Enevoldsen

Note: Flags indicate national union for the club/province as defined by World Rugby.

Player	Position	Date of birth (age)	Caps	Club/province
Bulela Butsheke	Prop		7	(Denmark) RK Speed
Marcus Borup	Hooker		2	(England) Chelmsford R.F.C.
Zak Underwood	Prop		1	(England) Hammersmith & Fulham RFC
Kenny Uddal Calmar	Lock		20	(Denmark) Aarhus RK
Hamish Coventry	Lock		6	(Denmark) Frederiksberg RK
Jeppe Maagaard Holm	Flanker		23	(Denmark) RK Speed
Marius Fricault	Flanker		2	(Denmark) RK Speed
Mikkel Andresen (c)	Number 8		19	(England) Kenilworth RFC
Thorbjorn Vestergaard	Scrum-half		23	(Denmark) Aarhus RK
Oliver Hvass	Fly-half		4	(Denmark) RK Speed
Victor Hounou	Wing		5	(Denmark) RK Speed
Joshua Jensen	Centre		41	(England) Swindon RFC
Simon Maagaard Holm	Centre		6	(Denmark) RK Speed
Rasmus Madum	Wing		7	(Denmark) Frederiksberg RK
Mads Søgaard Jørgensen	Fullback		2	(Denmark) RK Speed
Ali Kamil	Prop		3	(Denmark) RK Speed
Nicholas Bertelsen	Prop		1	(Denmark) RK Speed
Rasmus Brofeldt	??		1	(Denmark) RK Speed
Adam van Geyzel	??		1	(Denmark) Aarhus RK
Nils Hagen	??		1	(Sweden) Lugi Lions RFC
Axel Örn Petursson	Flanker		4	(Denmark) CSR-Nanok
Henry Miller	??		0	(Denmark) Frederiksberg RK
Otto Käszner	??		4	(Denmark) Frederiksberg RK

=== Recent call-ups ===
The following players have also been called up to the squad within the last 12 months.

Player	Pos	Date of birth (age)	Caps	Club	Latest call-up
Emil Svinth Aagaard	Hooker			(Denmark) Frederiksberg RK	v. Andorra, 30 September 2023
Michael Friis Larsen	Prop			(Denmark) Aalborg RK	v. Andorra, 30 September 2023
Federico Haedo	Flanker			(Argentina) San Isidro Club	v. Andorra, 30 September 2023
Dan Wiggins	Scrum Half			(England) Hitchin RFC	v. Andorra, 30 September 2023
Ben Wiggins	Fly Half			(England) Hitchin RFC	v. Andorra, 30 September 2023
Gerard Hounou	Wing			(Denmark) RK Speed	v. Andorra, 30 September 2023
Alexandros Mintsioulis	Hooker			(Denmark) Frederiksberg RK	v. Andorra, 30 September 2023
