= Rugby union in Saint Lucia =

Rugby organization in Saint Lucia

- Country: Saint Lucia
- Governing body: Saint Lucia Rugby Football Union
- National team: Saint Lucia

National competitions
- Rugby World Cup; Rugby World Cup Sevens; IRB Sevens World Series

Rugby union in St Lucia is a minor but growing sport. They are currently ranked 80th by the IRB.

== Governing body ==
The governing body is the St. Lucia Rugby Football Union.

== History ==
Saint Lucia's first ever international rugby match was actually a Round 1a one-off 2007 Rugby World Cup qualifying match, as part of the Americas tournaments in 2005. The match was played against St Vincent & Grenadines, and Saint Lucia won 36 points to 25, which enabled them to advance into the next round of World Cup qualifying.

== Women's rugby ==
Although St Lucia's women have not yet played test match rugby, they have been playing international sevens rugby since 2005. (Current playing record).

== Notable players ==
- Cornelius Henry, born in St Lucia is a dual cricket-rugby international for Canada.
- Marland Yarde, born in St Lucia played 13 times for the England scoring 30 points, he has played professionally for London Irish, Harlequins, Sale Sharks and currently Aviron Bayonnais.

== See also ==
- Saint Lucia national rugby union team
