= Rugby union in Burkina Faso =

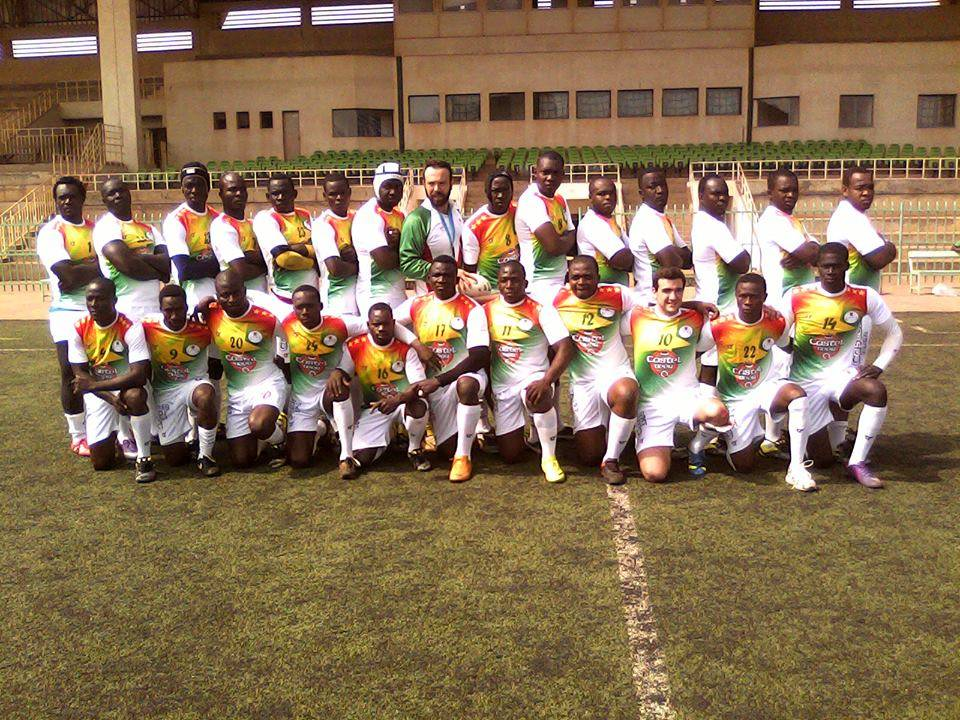
Rugby team from Burkina Faso

Rugby union in Burkina Faso is a minor but growing sport.

== Governing body ==
The governing body is affiliated to the Confederation of African Rugby, they became full members of World Rugby in 2020.

== History ==
Rugby union was introduced into Upper Volta, as it was then, by the French, who ruled the country for a number of years.

As with many minor rugby nations, the sport is centred on the national capital - Ouagadougou. Burkina Faso rates second last on the Human Development Index, which means it is extremely poor, and lacks the infrastructure that would improve its rugby standing.

The national coach of the Burkina Faso rugby team is Laurent Stravato. They just won the African cup of 7s in 2014.

Like many African countries, the historical connection with France is a mixed blessing. For a number of years, Burkinabé rugby players would leave to play there, which deprived rugby in Burkina Faso of any real competition. As an example, one of the most notable Burkinabé players was Fulgence Ouedraogo, who played for the France national rugby union team, but would have qualified for the Burkina Faso national rugby union team. Ouedraogo left Burkina Faso at an early age, and started playing rugby at the age of 6, meeting his MHRC teammate François Trinh-Duc, at the Pic-Saint-Loup rugby school near Montpellier.

== Women's rugby ==
The Burkina Faso women's team played their first test match on 9 June 2021 against Cameroon at Ouagadougou, they have been playing international sevens rugby since 2006. (Current playing record).

== See also ==
- Burkina Faso national rugby union team
- Confederation of African Rugby
- Africa Cup
