= Rugby union in Denmark =

- Country: Denmark
- Governing body: Danish Rugby Union
- National team: Denmark
- First played: 1931
- Registered players: 3,000
- Clubs: 30+

National competitions
- Rugby World Cup; Rugby World Cup Sevens; IRB Sevens World Series; European Nations Cup

Rugby union is a minor, but growing, sport in Denmark.

The Danish Rugby Union dates back to 1950, and joined the IRB in 1988. They joined the Scandinavian Rugby Union in 1974.

== History ==
Denmark is normally considered the second nation in Nordic rugby, after Sweden. Until 1980, they had never beaten Sweden, but since then, the silverware has been shared fairly equal, and in 1995 beat the touring side of Welsh Districts.

Rugby has been played in Denmark since 1931.

Levels of development in Denmark in the 1970s, were extremely uneven. For example, in 1973, when Comet met Lyndo in a match in Copenhagen, the scoreline was 194–0.

The Danes have a large amateur structure, which comprises over thirty clubs, and 3,000 registered players.

== See also ==
- Denmark national rugby union team
- Denmark women's national rugby union team
