= Rugby union in Rwanda =

Rugby union in Rwanda is a minor but growing sport. The national team is currently ranked 95th by World Rugby

== Governing body ==
The sport is governed by the Fédération Rwandaise de Rugby.

== History ==
Rwanda is a former colony of Belgium, and the game was first introduced from there.

Rwandan rugby had a low key but steady presence in colonial times; however, it went into decline post-Rwandan independence, and the horrors of the 1990s war also damaged the game beyond repair.

However, the aid agencies which arrived in the wake of that tragedy have reintroduced the game, which is being taken up by many of the young. One person in particular has said: "in my combined years I have yet to witness the passion and desire to play rugby as I did in Rwanda. The boys have such a passion to learn as much of the game as they can."

Rwanda has currently both a men's and a women's national rugby team.

== See also ==
- Rwanda national rugby union team
- Rwanda women's national rugby union team
- Confederation of African Rugby
- Africa Cup
