= Burundi women's national rugby union team =

The Burundi women's national rugby union team are a national sporting side of the Burundi, representing them at rugby union. The side first played a 10-a-side international in 2012. They have yet to play a full test match

== Results ==
=== Other internationals ===
Won	Lost	Draw

Test	Date	Opponent	PF	PA	Venue	Event
1	14 December 2012	Rwanda	5	12	Bujumbura	

== See also ==
- Rugby union in Burundi
