= Rome Sevens =

International rugby sevens tournament

The Roma Sevens International Rugby Sevens Tournament is held every year since 2002 in Rome, Italy, at the Stadio dei Marmi.

== Men's tournament ==
Participants in the Roma Sevens over the years: Australia national rugby sevens team, South Africa national rugby sevens team, Kenya national rugby sevens team, France national rugby sevens team, Argentina national rugby sevens team, Spain national rugby sevens team, Italy national rugby sevens team, Georgia national rugby sevens team, Netherlands national rugby union team (sevens), Ukraine national rugby union team, Army Rugby Union, Yug Rugby, Atlantis Sevens, Golden Lions, Stellenbosh University, Melrose RFC, Froggies, Samurai International R.F.C., Penguins R.F.C., Marauders R.F.C., Belgium Barbarians

== Gold Book ==
Edition	Winner (Men)	Winner (Women)
2002	(Italy) Lottomatica Roma	
2003	(United Kingdom) Samurai RFC	
2004	Italy Seven	
2005	(United Kingdom) Samurai RFC	
2006	(South Africa) Stellenbosch	
2007	(United Kingdom) Kooga Wailers	
2008	(United Kingdom) British Army ARU	
2009	(Italy) Roma Seven New Zealand Invitation	(United Kingdom) Samurai Ladies RFC
2010	Australia Seven	(New Zealand) NZ Aotearoa Māori
2011	(Italy) Roma Seven New Zealand Invitation	(New Zealand) NZ Aotearoa Māori
2012	(Italy) Roma Seven New Zealand Invitation	(New Zealand) NZ Aotearoa Māori
2013	(South Africa) Sud Africa	
2014	(South Africa) Sud Africa	(France) Paris Ladies

== Women's tournament ==
The women's tournament has been played since 2009.

=== 2009 ===
5 & 6 June 2009 The tournament was won by Samurai Ladies International (UK). Other participants were: Wooden Spoon, Italy, Israel, The Bassets Ladies, Murrayfields Wanderers RFC. No match results are available

=== 2010 ===
3–4 June

Pool 1

Nation	Won	Drawn	Lost	For	Against
France	2	0	0	58	14
Italy	1	0	1	38	17
Columbia	0	0	2	0	65

- France 41-0 Colombia
- Colombia 0-24 Italy
- Italy 14-17 France

Semi-finals:

- France 12-7 Spain
- “Red&Blu” Aoteaora Maori 22-7 Italy

Bowl final:

- Colombia 0-25 HJMKJ Moscow

Pool 2

Nation	Won	Drawn	Lost	For	Against
“Red&Blu” Aoteaora Maori (NZL)	2	0	0	64	7
Spain	1	0	1	33	17
Himki Moscow (RUS)	0	0	2	0	68

- “Red&Blu” Aoteaora Maori 47-0 HJMKJ Moscow
- HJMKJ Moscow 0-26 Spain
- “Red&Blu” Aoteaora Maori 17-7 Spain

Plate final:

- Italy 7-14 Spain

Final:

- “Red&Blu” Aoteaora Maori 19-5 France

=== 2011 ===
Source: 3–4 June

Pool 1

Nation	Won	Drawn	Lost	For	Against
Spain	3	0	0	57	20
Kusa (NZL/USA)	1	0	2	53	31
Brazil	1	0	2	29	53
France	1	0	2	32	62

- Brazil 17-12 Kusa
- France 10-19 Spain
- Spain 14-10 Kusa
- Brazil 12-17 France
- France 0-31 Kusa
- Brazil 0-24 Spain

Bowl Semi-finals:

- Italy 24-0 France
- Brazil 15-5 Germany

Bowl final:

- Italy 17-5 Brazil

Pool 2

Nation	Won	Drawn	Lost	For	Against
Netherlands	3	0	0	76	24
“Red&Blu” Aoteaora Maori (NZL)	2	0	1	67	26
Italy	1	0	2	33	55
Germany	0	0	3	19	90

- Netherlands 35-7 Germany
- “Red&Blu” Aoteaora Maori 28-0 Italy
- Italy 26-0 Germany
- “Red&Blu” Aoteaora Maori 10-14 Netherlands
- “Red&Blu” Aoteaora Maori 29-12 Germany
- Netherlands 27-7 Italy

Semi-finals:

- Spain 14-15 “Red&Blu” Aoteaora Maori
- Netherlands 7-12 Kusa

Final:

- “Red&Blu” Aoteaora Maori 12-10 Kusa

=== 2012 ===
18–19 May

Pool 1

Nation	Won	Drawn	Lost	For	Against
Aoteaora Maori	3	0	0	124	0
Georgia	2	0	1	28	54
Kazakhstan Olymp	1	0	2	31	66
Selezione Italy Cup	0	0	3	24	87

- Selezione Italy Cup 14-21 Olymp
- Aoteaora Maori 34-0 Georgia
- Selezione Italy Cup 10-14 Georgia
- Aoteaora Maori 28-0 Olymp
- Georgia 14-10 Olymp
- Selezione Italy Cup 0-52 Aoteaora Maori

Bowl Semi-finals:

- Olymp 45-0 President's XII
- Tukkies 21-0 Italy

Bowl final:

- Olymp 12-17 Tukkies

Pool 2

Nation	Won	Drawn	Lost	For	Against
Russia	3	0	0	99	7
Ukraine	2	0	1	42	27
Tukkies	1	0	2	102	22
President's XII	0	0	3	0	97

- Russia 22-0 Ukraine
- Tukkies w/o President's XII
- Tukkies 5-10 Ukraine
- President's XII 0-65 Russia
- Tukkies 7-12 Russia
- President's XII 0-32 Ukraine

Semi-finals:

- Aoteaora Maori 38-5 Ukraine
- Russia 34-0 Georgia

Third place

- Ukraine 22-0 Georgia

Final:

- Aoteaora Maori 24-21 Russia

== Notable players of the tournament ==
- Waisale Serevi
- Ben Gollings
- DJ Forbes
- Cecil Afrika
- Ollie Phillips
- Afeleke Pelenise
- Tomasi Cama
- Collins Injera
- Solomon King
- Chester Williams
- William Ryder
- Fritz Lee
- Apolosi Satala
- Justin Wilson
- Howard Graham
- Sherwin Stowers
- Lepani Nabuliwaqa
- John Rudd (rugby union)
- Rob Thirlby
- Renfred Dazel
- Tim Walsh (rugby union)
- Will Matthews (rugby union)
- Kyle Brown
- Mirco Bergamasco
- Mark Lee
