= Rwanda women's national rugby union team =

Sports team

The Rwanda women's national rugby union team are a national sporting side of the Rwanda, representing them at rugby union. The side first played in 2005.

== Results summary ==
(Full internationals only)

Rugby: Rwanda internationals 2005-
| Opponent | First game | Played | Won | Drawn | Lost | Percentage |
|---|---|---|---|---|---|---|
| Uganda | 2005 | 2 | 0 | 0 | 2 | 0.00% |
| Summary | 2005 | 2 | 0 | 0 | 2 | 0.00% |

== Results ==
=== Full internationals ===
| Test | Date | Opponent | PF | PA | Venue | Event |
|---|---|---|---|---|---|---|
| 1 | 26 February 2005 | Uganda | 0 | 92 | Kigali, Rwanda | |
| 2 | 10 December 2005 | Uganda | 0 | 81 | Kampala, Uganda | |

=== Other internationals ===
| Date | Rwanda | PF | PA | Opponent | Venue | Ref |
|---|---|---|---|---|---|---|
| 2012-12-15 | Rwanda | 12 | 5 | Burundi | Bujumbura | |

=== Other matches ===
| Date | Rwanda | PF | PA | Opponent | Venue | Note |
|---|---|---|---|---|---|---|
| 2004-12-04 | Rwanda XV | 0 | 183 | Uganda XV | Kampala | |

== See also ==
- Rugby union in Rwanda
