= 2003 FIRA Women's European Championship =

2003 FIRA European Championship
Tournament details
- Hosts: Sweden; Netherlands
- Dates: 1 May 2003– 11 May 2003
- Teams: 8

Final positions
- Champions: Spain
- Runner-up: France

Tournament statistics
- Matches played: 8

The 2003 FIRA Women's European Championship was the eighth edition of the tournament and featured only eight teams, divided into pools A and B. For the first time the A and B pools were also organised as separate competitions in different venues, and in different weeks. The A Pool in Malmö was won by Spain, and the B pool by Netherlands. France and Spain were represented by their respective "A" teams.

== Pool A (at Malmö, Sweden) ==
=== Bracket ===
Semi-finals
1 May – Malmö
Sweden | 0
France | 9
1 May – Malmö
Italy | 5
Spain | 29

Final
3 May – Malmö
France | 10
Spain | 16
Third place
3 May – Malmö
Sweden | 15
Italy | 10

=== Semi-finals ===
2003-05-01

| Sweden | 0–9 | France |

Malmö, Sweden

2003-05-01

| Italy | 5–29 | Spain |

Malmö, Sweden

=== 3rd/4th Place ===
2003-05-03

| Sweden | 15–10 | Italy |

Malmö, Sweden

=== Final ===
2003-05-03

| France | 10–16 | Spain |

Malmö, Sweden

== Pool B (at Amsterdam, Netherlands) ==
=== Bracket ===
Semi-finals
8 May – Amsterdam
Denmark | 0
Netherlands | 113
8 May – Amsterdam
Germany | 75
Norway | 0

Final
11 May – Amsterdam
Netherlands | 19
Germany | 12
Third place
11 May – Amsterdam
Denmark | 10 (2)
Norway | 10 (3)

=== Semi-finals ===
2003-05-08

| Denmark | 0–113 | Netherlands |

Amsterdam, Netherlands

2003-05-08

| Germany | 75–0 | Norway |

Amsterdam, Netherlands

=== 3rd/4th Place ===
2003-05-11

| Denmark | 10–10 | Norway |

Amsterdam, Netherlands

Norway won 3-2 on penalties

=== Final ===
2003-05-11

| Netherlands | 19–12 | Germany |

Amsterdam, Netherlands

== See also ==
- Women's international rugby
