= Frederiksberg RK =

Danish rugby union club

- Full name: Frederiksberg Rugby Klub
- Nickname: The Falcons
- Founded: 1975
- Location: Frederiksberg, Denmark
- Ground(s): Nandrupsvej Idrætsanlæg, Frederiksberg Idrætsanlæg
- President: Frank Meldgaard Pedersen
- Coach: Richard Groom
- League: DRU Superliga
Team kit

Frederiksberg RK is a Danish rugby union club based in Frederiksberg (Copenhagen area). The senior team competes in the DRU Division One. The club also includes a women's team and a vibrant youth section.

== History ==
The club was founded in 1975 by Erik Andersen, who then served as Chairman of the Danish Rugby Union (1969–1996), to provide the proper sports infrastructure for his children and their friends in the city of Frederiksberg.

== Recent Internationally-Capped Players ==
- (Denmark) Tomas Mayne
- (Denmark) Rasmus Greve
- (Denmark) Emil Svinth Aagaard
- (Denmark) Michael Attali Strøyberg
- (Denmark) Andrei Ungureanu
- (Denmark) Eugene Hanrahan
- (Denmark) Erwan Caquineau
- (Denmark) Thomas Hobbs
- (Denmark) Rasmus Madum
- (Denmark) Cassius Deschamps
- (Denmark) Otto Kaszner
- (Denmark) Thomas Thimothée
- (Denmark) Geoffroy Gauthier
- (Denmark) Hamish Coventry
- (Bulgaria) Nikolay Hinov
- (Latvia) Jānis Podiņš
- (Mexico) Unai Arrieta Armendariz

== Honours ==
- Danish Championship
  - 1992, 1993, 2002, 2003, 2004, 2005, 2015, 2018, 2019, 2021*, 2022
- Danish Cup
  - 1992, 1994, 1998, 1999, 2001, 2004, 2005, 2006.

The 2020 Danish Championship was not disputed due to the COVID-19 pandemic.
