= RK Speed =

Danish rugby union club

(Denmark) RK Speed
- Full name: Rugbyklubben Speed
- Founded: 31 March 1949; 77 years ago
- Location: Kastrup, Copenhagen, Denmark
- Chairman: Arne Jørgensen
- Coach(es): Junaire Brown (Head), Lucas Gribaudo (Assistant), Simon Holm (Assistant), Graham Klusener (Manager), Sune Hougaard Nielsen (S&C Physio)
- Captain(s): Nicklas Tell, Malte Madsen (vc), Anders Hagelin (vc)
Team kit

Official website
- rkspeed.dk

RK Speed is a Danish rugby union club in Kastrup, Copenhagen on the island of Amager. It is the oldest rugby club in Denmark.

== History ==
In 1947-48, after the Second World War, a group of young Danes who had served in the British Army learnt the rules of rugby union.

They met again in Copenhagen after their return and decided to start a rugby union club that would take the name of “Ex-Army”. Their rivals were mainly visiting teams from Great Britain and then the Police Rugby Club, formed in 1948-49 by Eigil Hemmert Lund, who also founded the DRU (Danish Rugby Union).

During the first weeks of 1949, the veteran soldiers did not meet as often as the previous years, however rugby garnered support from other locals who were interested in continuing playing, so all interested in continuing rugby in Denmark were invited to a meeting on 31 March 1949.

Both new players who wanted to become club members and a few of those former soldiers who wanted to keep on playing rugby were present that day.

They decided they had to change the club's name and narrowed it down two options. Since they could not decide, they drew from a hat. That is how RK Speed took its name and was later founded.

The club was established in 1949 and has played senior-level rugby in Denmark since its formation, becoming the oldest Danish club, a day older than the Danish Rugby Union, formed by Eigil Hemmert Lund on 1 April 1949, although it was only officially established in 1950.

== Club achievements ==
RK Speed has been one of the most successful clubs in Danish Rugby ever since.

- 11 Danish Championships
- 3 Cup Trophies
- 1 Nordic Championship

are amongst others, the club's honours.

== Recent Internationally Capped Players ==
- (Denmark) Oliver Le Roux
- (Denmark) Johannes Mackeprang (captain 2015-2018)
- (Denmark) Nicklas V Tell (captain 2018)
- (Denmark) Malte Madsen
- (Denmark) Christian Fiji Melgaard
- (Denmark) Mark Franklin Nielsen
- (Denmark) Emil Enna
- (Denmark) Kristoffer Vandborg
- (Denmark) Dodji Hounou
- (Denmark) Gerard Hounou
- (Denmark) Victor Hounou
- (Denmark) Junaire Brown
- (Denmark) Jeppe Holm
- (Denmark) Simon Holm
- (Denmark) Matias Dinesen
- (Denmark) Joakim Nielsen
- (Denmark) Ruben Garcia
- (Denmark) Esben Thorius
- (Denmark) Anders Hagelin
- (Denmark) Bradley Diamandis
- (Denmark) Alexander Østergaard
- (Denmark) Nicolai Stark
- (Denmark) Dennis Stark
- (Denmark) Pierre-Alexandre Weiss
- (Denmark) Bulela “Butch” Butsheke
- (Denmark) Oliver Hvass
