= Austria women's national rugby union team =

Austria
- Union: Austrian Rugby Federation
First colours

World Rugby ranking
- Current: 38 (as of 2 March 2026)
- Lowest: 39 (2025)

First international
- Austria 5–5 Czech Republic (Hohe Warte Stadium, Vienna; 5 June 2004)

Biggest win
- Austria 20–7 Czech Republic (BLZ Atzgersdorf, Vienna; 23 November 2025)

Biggest defeat
- Austria 5–55 Georgia (Sinj; 22 February 2026)

The Austria women's national rugby union team are a national sporting side of Austria, representing them at rugby union. The side first played in 2004.

== History ==
Austria has been participating in the FIRA-AER European Championships since 2005. First Captain of the Austrian Women's National Team was Renee Carmine-Jones (originally from Canada, in Austria since 1984) who officially initiated Women's Rugby for the Union and set up the women's national team (Season 2003/2004), built up women's rugby at Celtic Rugby Football Club and, at the request of the Union President following their first Test against the Czech Republic, set up the second women's team at Rugby Club Donau and has been developing the women's game in Austria, now with 5 National (Frauen Bundesliga) League team, and in her region ever since through her Regional League and Emerging Nations Training Camps for the bottom 15-20 Nations of Europe.

== Results summary ==
(Full internationals only, updated to 28 April 2023)

Austria Internationals From 2004
Opponent	First Match	Played	Won	Drawn	Lost	For	Against	Win %
Czech Republic	2004	3	1	2	0	30	17	33.33%
Georgia	2026	1	0	0	1	5	55	0%
Summary	2004	4	1	2	1	35	72	25%

== Results ==
=== Full internationals ===
Won	Lost	Draw

Test	Date	Opponent	PF	PA	Venue	Event	Ref
1	2004-06-05	Czech Republic	5	5	Hohe Warte Stadium, Vienna	Test	
2	2005-04-30	Czech Republic	5	5	Hohe Warte Stadium, Vienna	Test	
3	2025-11-23	Czech Republic	20	7	BLZ Atzgersdorf, Vienna, Austria	2025–26 REC	
4	2026-02-22	Georgia	5	55	Sinj	2025–26 REC	

=== Other matches ===
Date	Opponent	PF	PA	Opponent	Venue	Ref
2007-06-24	Austria / Croatia	17	7	Hungary / Bavaria	Grossmugl, Austria	

== Austrian National Women's League Teams ==
- FRU Schoenbrunn (Frauen Rugby Union - Vienna Union of Celtic and Donau Women's Teams)
- WRCI (Women's Rugby Club Innsbruck)
- RC Graz (Women's Rugby Team Graz)
- RC Krems (Women's Rugby Team Krems)
- RC Spartans Melk (Women's Rugby Team Melk)

== List of Coaches ==
- Coach: Christopher Jones (March–June 2004)
- Co-Coach: Renee Carmine-Jones (Sept.2003-June 2004)
- Coach: Thomas Brinninger (Sept.2004-April 2005)
- Co-Coach: Renee Carmine-Jones (Sept.2004-April 2005)
- Coach: Renee Carmine-Jones (April 2005-present)
- Co-Coach: Philipp Grausam (April 2005-June 2006)
- Co-Coach: Gordon Chiu (March 2010-June 2010)

== List of Captains ==
Captain	Years
Renee Carmine-Jones	2003–2005; 2007
Catherine Teisset	2006
Eva Weissenböck	2008–2012

== See also ==
- Rugby union in Austria
