= 2005 FIRA Women's European Championship =

2005 FIRA European Championship
Tournament details
- Hosts: Germany; Bosnia and Herzegovina
- Dates: 7 April 2003– 23 May 2003
- Teams: 7

Final positions
- Champions: Italy
- Runner-up: Netherlands

Tournament statistics
- Matches played: 10

The 2005 FIRA Women's European Championship was the tenth edition of the tournament. It was jointly hosted by Germany and Bosnia and Herzegovina and took place from 7th April to 23rd May. Only seven teams took part.

== Tournament ==
=== Pool A ===
Pool A was held in Hamburg, Germany from April 7-9.

==== Semi-finals ====
2005-04-07

Netherlands	8–7	Sweden

Hamburg, Germany

2005-04-07

Germany	0–52	Italy

Hamburg, Germany

==== 3rd/4th Place ====
2005-04-09

Germany	5–17	Sweden

Hamburg, Germany

==== Final ====
2005-04-09

Italy	22–3	Netherlands

Hamburg, Germany

=== Pool B ===
Pool B was held at Zenica, Bosnia from May 21-23.

==== Final table ====
Pos	Nation	Pld	W	D	L	PF	PA	PD	Pts
1	Russia	4	4	0	0	213	0	+213	8
2	Norway	4	2	0	2	52	74	−22	4
3	Bosnia and Herzegovina	4	0	0	4	0	191	−191	0

==== Round one ====
2005-05-21

Norway	0–25	Russia

Zenica, Bosnia

2005-05-21

Bosnia and Herzegovina	0–30	Norway

Zenica, Bosnia

2005-05-21

Bosnia and Herzegovina	0–74	Russia

Zenica, Bosnia

==== Round two ====
2005-05-23

Norway	0–49	Russia

Zenica, Bosnia

2005-05-23

Bosnia and Herzegovina	0–22	Norway

Zenica, Bosnia

2005-05-23

Bosnia and Herzegovina	0–65	Russia

Zenica, Bosnia

== See also ==
- Women's international rugby
