= RC Odense =

Danish rugby union club, based in Odense

- Full name: Rugby Club Odense
- Founded: 27 June 1980; 45 years ago (as Holluf Pile Idrætsforening)
- Location: Odense, Denmark
- Chairman: Frederik Pryds
- Coach: Søren Brobyskov (player-coach)
Team kit

RC Odense is a Danish rugby union club in Odense. They function as an independent club, with their own junior teams, but have been playing in combination with Lindø RSC at senior level for a few years.

== History ==
The club was founded on 27 June 1980 as part of the Holluf Pile Idrætsforening as it was then known (now called Holluf Pile og Tornbjerg Idrætsforening, or HPTI).

For the first couple of years of its existence, the club had only junior sides, first entering a senior team in the 1983/1984 season. However they withdrew from the league after only one season due to a shortage of players. In April 1990, they tried again, with more success this time which saw the team playing in the Jutland/Funen Championships.

The club's first silverware at senior level came in the year 2000, when the men's side won the Danish Sevens.

== Honours ==
- Danish Sevens
  - 2000
