= Rugby union in Burundi =

Rugby union in Burundi is a minor but growing sport.

== Governing body ==
The governing body is the Burundi Rugby Federation.

== History ==
Rugby was first introduced into Burundi in the late 20th century. Burundi was a colony of Belgium until 1962, and some of the earliest games may have been played by people from there (see Rugby union in Belgium). Rugby was also being played in other countries in the region - such as Tanzania, Uganda and Kenya - that were British colonies, again, mainly by whites.

In the 1970s and 1980s, rugby in Burundi became better organised. During that period, it was mainly played by Belgian and French ex-patriates in the country.

=== Intambwe Rugby Club ===
The first formally registered club was the Intambwe Rugby Club or IRC. The clubs first presidents were Stanislas Mandi and Christian Taupiac.

It produced some notable players including Marc Bourgeois, Charles Mugiraneza, "Okume", Bernard Bordes, Patrice Ndindakumana, Lilian Campan, Louis Riboli and Simeon Sahabo.

The IRC played a number of matches, including ones against French, Rwandan and Kenyan teams.

== See also ==
- Burundi national rugby union team
- Confederation of African Rugby
- Africa Cup
