= Aarhus RK =

- Full name: Aarhus Rugby Klub
- Founded: 1974
- Location: Aarhus, Denmark
- Ground: ARK Park
- President: Jette Schmidt
- Coach(es): (South Africa) Quinton Greyling (coach) & (England) Chris Adby (Assistant coach)
- League: DRU Superliga
Team kit

Aarhus RK is a Danish rugby club in Aarhus. They currently play in the DRU Superliga.

== History ==
The club was founded in 1974.

In 2006 the club became Danish Rugby champions in the Danish Superleague and also the first official Danish champions in Danish rugby 7’s. They continued their XV men championship success in 2008, 2011 & 2012, and also in the Danish 7s championship in 2007, 08' & 12'.

=== Internationally Capped Players ===
- (Denmark) Niels Gotfredsen
- (Denmark) Mikael Lai Rasmussen
- (Denmark) Preben Rasmussen
- (Denmark) Rasmus Mortensen
- (Denmark) René Thorup Kristensen
- (Denmark) Andrew Grantham
