= Poland women's national rugby union team =

Team representing Poland in international women's rugby union

Poland
- Union: Polish Rugby Union

First international
- Poland 7–26 Czech Republic

Biggest defeat
- Poland 7–26 Czech Republic

The Poland women's national rugby union team represents Poland in women's rugby union. They played their first international match in 2026.

== History ==
Poland played their first test match on 1 March 2026 against the Czech Republic at the Burloch Arena in Ruda Śląska, Poland. They are currently ranked 40th on World Rugby's rankings as of 2 March 2026. (Note: They were initially ranked 40th after their match with the Czech Republic on World Rugby's World rankings, however, they are currently not on the recent table.)

== Results ==
=== Results summary ===
(Full internationals only, updated to 1 March 2026)

Poland Internationals From 2026
Opponent	First match	Played	Won	Drawn	Lost	Win %
Czech Republic	2026	1	0	0	1	0%
Summary	2026	1	0	0	1	0%

=== Full internationals ===
Won	Lost	Draw

Test	Date	Opponent	PF	PA	Venue	Event	Ref
1	1 March 2026	Czech Republic	7	26	Burloch Arena, Ruda Śląska, Poland	First test match	
