= Denmark women's national rugby union team =

Denmark
- Union: Danish Rugby Union
First colours

World Rugby ranking
- Current: 46 (as of 2 March 2026)
- Highest: 33 (2023)
- Lowest: 46 (2026)

First international
- Denmark 0-113 Netherlands (Amsterdam, Netherlands 8 May 2003)

Biggest win
- Denmark 39-7 Norway (Copenhagen, Denmark 1 November 2025)

Biggest defeat
- Netherlands 141-3 Denmark (Toulouse, France 2 May 2004)

The Denmark women's national rugby union team is a national sporting side of Denmark, representing them at rugby union. The side played their first test match in 2003 against the Netherlands.

== History ==
Denmark made their test debut against the Netherlands on 8 May 2003 in Amsterdam, the Dutch routed them 113–0. So far, Denmark has only played five international games and participated in just two regional tournaments — the 2003 and 2004 FIRA Women's Championships.

On 2 November 2024, Denmark played a non-international against Norway in Oslo. The last time both teams played each other was 20 years ago in Toulouse, France.

Denmark played Latvia to a 15–15 draw in Riga, Latvia. It was their first international match in 20 years.

== Results summary ==
(Full internationals only)

Rugby: Denmark internationals 2003-
Opponent	First game	Played	Won	Drawn	Lost	Percentage
Germany	2004	1	0	0	1	0.00%
Latvia	2025	1	0	1	0	0.00%
Netherlands	2003	2	0	0	2	0.00%
Norway	2003	3	1	1	1	33.33%
Sweden	2026	1	0	0	1	0.00%
Summary	2003	8	1	2	5	12.50%

== Results ==
=== Full internationals ===
Legend

Won	Lost	Draw

=== 2003–2004 ===
Test	Date	Opponent	PF	PA	Venue	Event
1	2003-05-08	Netherlands	0	113	Amsterdam, Netherlands	2003 FIRA Championship
2	2003-05-11	Norway	10	10	Amsterdam, Netherlands	2003 FIRA Championship
3	2004-05-02	Netherlands	3	141	Toulouse, France	2004 FIRA Championship
4	2004-05-05	Germany	0	47	Toulouse, France	2004 FIRA Championship
5	2004-05-08	Norway	5	8	Toulouse, France	2004 FIRA Championship

=== 2025–Present ===
Test	Date	Opponent	PF	PA	Venue	Event
6	2025-09-20	Latvia	15	15	Riga, Latvia Riga Technical College	Test Match
7	2025-11-01	Norway	39	7	Copenhagen, Denmark CSR/Nanok	1st Home Test Match
8	2026-10-31	Sweden	40	5	Copenhagen, Denmark RK Speed	Development teams played beforehand
9	2026-11-21	Switzerland			Nyon, Switzerland	

=== Non-internationals ===
Date	Denmark	PF	PA	Opponent	Venue	Ref
2003-05-03	Denmark	0	37	Sweden A	Copenhagen	
2003-11-01	Denmark	17	0	Norwegian Barbarians	Copenhagen	
2024-11-02	Denmark	7	0	Norway	Oslo	

== See also ==
- Rugby union in Denmark
