= Lindø RSC =

Danish rugby union club, based in Munkebo

- Full name: Lindø Rugby Sport Club
- Founded: 1960; 66 years ago
- Location: Munkebo, Denmark
- Ground: Mølkær School
- Chairman: Sebastian Bach
- Coach: Søren Brobyskov (player-coach)
1st kit	2nd kit

Lindø RSC is a Danish rugby union club in Munkebo. They function as an independent club, with their own junior teams, but have been playing in combination with RC Odense at senior level since 2010. The club is probably best known as being on the wrong end of a 194–0 scoreline against now-defunct Comet in 1973, which has been noted in the Guinness Book of Records.

== History ==
The club was founded by Bertil Jansson in 1960. From 1997 to 2002 they won the Danish Championships consecutively and have also won eight Danish Cup titles.

== Honours ==
- Danish Championships
  - 1997, 1998, 1999, 2000, 2001, 2002
