= Danish Rugby Union =

Sports governing body in Denmark

Dansk Rugby Union
- Sport: Rugby union
- Founded: 1950; 76 years ago
- World Rugby affiliation: 1988
- Rugby Europe affiliation: 1971
- Website: www.rugby.dk

The Danish Rugby Union (DRU) (Danish: Dansk Rugby Union) is the governing body for rugby union in Denmark. Rugby began being played in Denmark in 1931 but it was not until 1950 that the DRU was established. In 1971 the DRU joined Rugby Europe, previously called FIRA - Association of European Rugby, followed by the Skandinavisk Rugby Union in 1974 before finally joining the International Rugby Board (now World Rugby) in 1988.

== See also ==
- Denmark national rugby union team
