= Serbia women's national rugby union team =

Serbia
- Union: Rugby Union of Serbia
First colours

World Rugby ranking
- Current: 67 (as of 2 March 2026)
- Highest: 58
- Lowest: 67 (2026)

First international
- Romania 65–0 Serbia (Brussels; 11 April 2007)

Biggest defeat
- Romania 65–0 Serbia (Brussels; 11 April 2007)

The Serbia women's national rugby union team represents Serbia at rugby union. The side first played against Romania in 2007.

== Background ==
Serbia competed in the 2007 FIRA Women's European Championship and played their first test match against Romania on 11 April in Brussels. They have only played four test matches so far.

== Results summary ==
(Full internationals only, updated to 24 April 2023)

Serbia Internationals From 2007
| Opponent | First Match | Played | Won | Drawn | Lost | Win % |
|---|---|---|---|---|---|---|
| Belgium | 2007 | 1 | 0 | 0 | 1 | 0.00% |
| Luxembourg | 2007 | 1 | 0 | 0 | 1 | 0.00% |
| Norway | 2007 | 1 | 0 | 0 | 1 | 0.00% |
| Romania | 2007 | 1 | 0 | 0 | 1 | 0.00% |
| Summary | 2007 | 4 | 0 | 0 | 4 | 0.00% |

== Results ==
=== Full internationals ===
| Won | Lost | Draw |

| Test | Date | PF | PA | Opponent | Venue | Event | Ref |
|---|---|---|---|---|---|---|---|
| 1 | 2007-04-11 | 0 | 65 | Romania | Brussels | 2007 FIRA Championship | |
| 2 | 2007-04-12 | 0 | 20 | Belgium | Frameries | 2007 FIRA Championship | |
| 3 | 2007-04-13 | 0 | 20 | Luxembourg | Dendermonde | 2007 FIRA Championship | |
| 4 | 2007-04-15 | 0 | 62 | Norway | Tervuren | 2007 FIRA Championship | |
