= Bosnia and Herzegovina women's national rugby union team =

Bosnia and Herzegovina
- Union: Rugby Union of Bosnia & Herzegovina

World Rugby ranking
- Current: 55 (as of 2 March 2026)
- Highest: 47 (2023)
- Lowest: 55 (2026)

First international
- Bosnia and Herzegovina 0–30 Norway (Zenica; 21 May 2005)

Biggest defeat
- Bosnia and Herzegovina 0–74 Russia (Zenica; 21 May 2005)

The Bosnia and Herzegovina women's national rugby union team are a national sporting side of Bosnia and Herzegovina, representing them at rugby union. The side played their first test match against Norway at the 2005 European Championship. They are currently 55th in World Rugby's ranking.

== Results summary ==
(Full internationals only, updated to 28 April 2023)

Bosnia and Herzegovina Internationals From 2005
Opponent	First Match	Played	Won	Drawn	Lost	For	Against	Win %
Norway	2005	2	0	0	2	0	52	0.00%
Russia	2005	2	0	0	2	0	139	0.00%
Summary	2005	4	0	0	4	0	191	0.00%

== Results ==
=== Full internationals ===
Won	Lost	Draw

Test	Date	Opponent	PF	PA	Venue	Event	Ref
1	2005-05-21	Norway	0	30	Zenica	2005 FIRA European Championship Div 2	
2	2005-05-21	Russia	0	74	Zenica	2005 FIRA European Championship Div 2	
3	2005-05-23	Norway	0	22	Zenica	2005 FIRA European Championship Div 2	
4	2005-05-23	Russia	0	65	Zenica	2005 FIRA European Championship Div 2	

== See also ==
- Rugby union in Bosnia and Herzegovina
