= CSR/Nanok =

- Full name: Christianshavns Skoles Rugbyklub/Nanok
- Nickname: CSR - Nanok
- Founded: October 1970
- Location: Christianshavn, Copenhagen, Denmark
- President: Thomas Grann
- Coach(es): Nich Gulris, Stefan Soussan, Emad Libis, João Miguel Ejarque, Sebastian Vernon, Ali Jahouh
- League: DM Men's Division 1, DM Women's Sevens
Team kit

Christianshavns Skoles Rugbyklub/Nanok, commonly known as CSR/Nanok, is a Danish rugby club in Copenhagen. The club has a men's XV team, women's sevens team and youth age grade teams. They train and play their matches at Arsenalvej 2, in Christianshavn.

== Honours ==
- Danish Championships
  - 1987, 1990, 2007, 2009, 2010
- Danish Cup
  - 1983, 1990, 2007, 2009, 2010, 2011, 2012
