= International rugby league in 2008 =

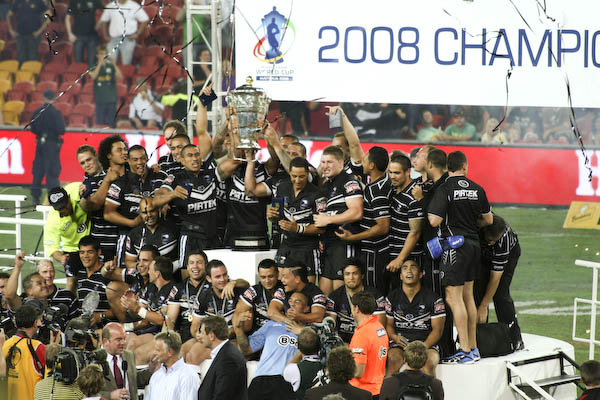
- New Zealand winning their first Rugby League World Cup in 2008

This is a list of international rugby league matches played throughout 2008. A † denotes a recognised, but unofficial match that did not contribute to the IRL World Rankings.

The 2008 season marked a shift in international rugby league with the return on the Rugby League World Cup after an eight year hiatus, played as a 100th Anniversary celebration of rugby league in Australia.

2008 also saw the end of traditional touring with the 2007 All Golds Tour being the final extended tour, and no tours taking place until the 2015 Kiwi tour which was considerably shorter than previous tours and also marked the longest time without a tour in peace time.

== May ==
=== ANZAC Test ===
9 May 2008
8:00pm (AEST)

Australia	28 – 12	New Zealand
Tries: Mark Gasnier (6', 14') 2 Paul Gallen (18') 1 Cameron Smith (22') 1 Israel Folau (64') 1 Goals: Johnathan Thurston 4/5 (8', 19', 23', 66')	1st: 22 - 0; 2nd: 6 - 12; Report	Tries: Iosia Soliola (43') 1 Sam Perrett (80') 1 Goals: Jeremy Smith 1/1 (44'); Issac Luke 1/1 (80')

Sydney Cricket Ground
Attendance: 34,571
Referee: Ashley Klein (Australia)
Player of the Match: Cameron Smith

== June ==
=== France vs England ===
27 June 2008

France	8 – 56	England
	Report

Stade Ernest-Wallon, Toulouse
Attendance: 8,326

== October ==
=== England vs Wales ===
10 October 2008

England	74 – 0	Wales
	Report

Keepmoat Stadium, Doncaster
Attendance: 11,263

=== New Zealand vs Tonga ===
18 October 2008

New Zealand	56 – 8	Tonga
	[Report]

Mount Smart Stadium, Auckland

=== Men's World Cup ===
==== Group A ====
Pos	Team	Pld	W	D	L	PF	PA	PD	Pts	Qualification
1	Australia (H)	3	3	0	0	128	16	+112	6	Advance to knockout stage
2	New Zealand	3	2	0	1	90	60	+30	4	Advance to knockout stage
3	England	3	1	0	2	60	110	−50	2	Advance to knockout stage
4	Papua New Guinea	3	0	0	3	34	126	−92	0	

(H) Hosts

25 October 2008
19:00 AEST (UTC+10:00)

England	32–22	Papua New Guinea
Tries: Ade Gardner 12' c, 70' c Lee Smith 28' c, 51' m, 73' m Martin Gleeson 58' c Goals: Kevin Sinfield (4)	Report	Tries: Rod Griffin 20' c Jason Chan 36' c George Keppa 40' m Paul Aiton 75' c Goals: John Wilshere (3)

Willows Sports Complex, Townsville
Attendance: 10,780
Referee: Shayne Hayne (Australia)
Player of the Match: James Roby (England)

26 October 2008
20:00 ADST (UTC+11:00)

Australia	30–6	New Zealand
Tries: Greg Inglis 14' c Joel Monaghan 30' c Israel Folau 48' m, 80' c Billy Slater 60' c Goals: Johnathan Thurston (4); Cameron Smith (1)	Report	Tries: Manu 26' c Goals: Steve Matai (1)

Sydney Football Stadium, Sydney
Attendance: 34,157
Referee: Ashley Klein (Australia)
Player of the Match: Johnathan Thurston (Australia)

1 November 2008
19:00 AEST (UTC+10:00)

New Zealand	48–6	Papua New Guinea
Tries: Simon Mannering (2); Sam Perrett (2); Jerome Ropati; Issac Luke; David Fa'alogo; Adam Blair; Greg Eastwood; Goals: Krisnan Inu (5)	Report	Tries: David Moore; Goals: John Wilshire (1)

Robina Stadium, Gold Coast
Attendance: 11,278
Referee: Steve Ganson (England)
Player of the Match: Adam Blair (New Zealand)

2 November 2008
20:00 ADST (UTC+11:00)

Australia	52–4	England
Tries: Billy Slater 5', 63', 70'; Greg Inglis 10', 33'; Anthony Laffranchi 37', 77'; Joel Monaghan 56'; Scott Prince 65'; Goals: Scott Prince (8/10)	Report	Tries: James Roby 20'; Goals: Kevin Sinfield (0/1)

Docklands Stadium, Melbourne
Attendance: 36,297
Referee: Tony Archer (Australia)
Player of the Match: Billy Slater (Australia)

8 November 2008
20:00 ADST (UTC+11:00)

England	24–36	New Zealand
Tries: Rob Burrow (2); Mickey Higham; Martin Gleeson; Goals: Rob Purdham (4)	Report	Tries: Manu Vatuvei (4); Lance Hohaia; Jason Nightingale; Nathan Fien; Goals: Issac Luke (3); Jeremy Smith (1)

Newcastle International Sports Centre, Newcastle
Attendance: 15,145
Referee: Tony Archer (Australia)
Player of the Match: Manu Vatuvei (New Zealand)

9 November 2008
19:00 AEST (UTC+10:00)

Australia	46–6	Papua New Guinea
Tries: David Williams (3); Scott Prince (2); Joel Monaghan; Anthony Tupou; Goals: Johnathan Thurston (7)	Report	Tries: Menzie Yere; Goals: John Wilshire (1)

Willows Sports Complex, Townsville
Attendance: 16,239
Referee: Steve Ganson (England)
Player of the Match: Craig Fitzgibbon (Australia)

==== Group B ====
Pos	Team	Pld	W	D	L	PF	PA	PD	Pts	Qualification
1	Fiji	2	1	0	1	58	24	+34	2	Advance to knockout stage
2	Scotland	2	1	0	1	36	52	−16	2	
3	France	2	1	0	1	42	60	−18	2	

26 October 2008
17:25 ADST (UTC+11:00)

France	36–18	Scotland
Tries: Jared Taylor 16' c Jérôme Guisset 28' c, 75' c John Wilson 33' c Sébastien Raguin 54' c Christophe Moly 80' c Goals: Thomas Bosc (6)	Report	Tries: Jon Steel 20' c Oliver Wilkes 46' c Dean Colton 62' c Goals: Danny Brough (3)

Canberra Stadium, Canberra
Attendance: 9,287
Referee: Leon Williamson (New Zealand)

1 November 2008
17:25 ADST (UTC+11:00)

Fiji	42–6	France
Tries: Akuila Uate (3); Jarryd Hayne (2); Iowane Divavesi; Semisi Tora; Goals: Wes Naiqama (7)	Report	Tries: John Wilson Goals: Thomas Bosc (1)

Wollongong Showground, Wollongong
Attendance: 9,213
Referee: Ashley Klein (England)
Player of the Match: Jarryd Hayne (Fiji)

5 November 2008
19:55 ADST (UTC+11:00)

Scotland	18–16	Fiji
Tries: Jon Steel; Michael Robertson; Oliver Wilkes; Goals: Danny Brough (3)	Report	Tries: Semi Tadulala (2); Jason Bukuya Goals: Wes Naiqama (2)

Central Coast Stadium, Gosford
Attendance: 9,720
Referee: Leon Williamson (New Zealand)

==== Group C ====
Pos	Team	Pld	W	D	L	PF	PA	PD	Pts	Qualification
1	Ireland	2	1	0	1	54	38	+16	2	Advance to knockout stage
2	Tonga	2	1	0	1	34	40	−6	2	
3	Samoa	2	1	0	1	36	46	−10	2	

27 October 2008
18:55 ADST (UTC+11:00)

Tonga	22–20	Ireland
Tries: Michael Jennings 10' c Cooper Vuna 36' m Etuate Uaisele 59' c Esikeli Tonga 74' m Goals: Joel Taufa'ao (2); Tony Williams (1)	Report	Tries: Damien Blanch 26' m, 51' m, 67' c Michael Platt 30' c Goals: Pat Richards (2)

Parramatta Stadium, Sydney
Attendance: 6,165
Referee: Steve Ganson (England)

31 October 2008
18:55 ADST (UTC+11:00)

Samoa	20–12	Tonga
Tries: Francis Meli; Nigel Vagana; Matt Utai; George Carmont; Goals: Ben Roberts (2)	Report	Tries: Michael Jennings; Tevita Leo-Latu Goals: Tony Williams (2)

Penrith Stadium, Sydney
Attendance: 11,787
Referee: Shayne Hayne (Australia)

5 November 2008
18:55 ADST (UTC+11:00)

Ireland	34–16	Samoa
Tries: Pat Richards 12', 43', 79'; Simon Finnigan 14'; Sean Gleeson 19'; Liam Finn 71'; Goals: Pat Richards (5)	Report	Tries: Nigel Vagana 25'; Misi Taulapapa 35'; David Solomona 75' Goals: Ben Roberts (2)

Parramatta Stadium, Sydney
Attendance: 8,067
Referee: Thierry Alibert (France)
Player of the Match: Pat Richards (Ireland)

Quarter-final
B1	Fiji	30
C1	Ireland	14

Semi-finals
A2	New Zealand	32
A3	England	22
A1	Australia	52
Fiji	0

Final
New Zealand	34
Australia	20

==== 9th place play-off ====
9 November 2008
17:25 ADST (UTC+11:00)

France	10–42	Samoa
Tries: Guisset; Planas; Goals: Bosc	Report	Tries: Te'o (2); Utai; Meli; Carmont; Taulapapa; Roberts; T. Puletua; Goals: Roberts (3); Paulo (2)

Penrith Stadium, Sydney
Attendance: 8,028
Referee: Thierry Alibert (France)

==== 7th place play-off ====
8 November 2008
16:00 AEST (UTC+10:00)

Scotland	0–48	Tonga
	Report	Tries: Vuna (2); Mateo; Paea; Uaisele; Williams; Talanoa; Jennings; Goals: Williams (7); Paea

Browne Park, Rockhampton
Attendance: 5,930
Referee: Shane Hayne (Australia)

==== Quarter-final ====
10 November 2008
18:55 AEST (UTC+10:00)

Fiji	30–14	Ireland
Tries: Uate (2); Bukuya; Hayne; Naiqama; Goals: Wes Naiqama (5/6)	Report	Tries: Blanch (2); Grix; Goals: Richards (1/4)

Robina Stadium, Gold Coast
Attendance: 8,224
Referee: Ashley Klein (England)
Player of the Match: Aaron Groom (Fiji)

==== Semi-finals ====
15 November 2008
18:55 AEST (UTC+10:00)

New Zealand	32–22	England
Tries: Ropati (2); Perrett; Hohaia; Harrison; Marshall; Goals: Smith (3); Marshall	Report	Tries: McGuire (2); Peacock; Gleeson; Goals: Burrow (3)

Lang Park, Brisbane
Attendance: 26,659
Referee: Shane Hayne (Australia)
Player of the Match: Benji Marshall (New Zealand)

16 November 2008
19:55 ADST (UTC+11:00)

Australia	52–0	Fiji
Tries: Gallen 2'; Tate (2) 5', 16'; Slater (3) 9', 38', 49'; Thurston (3) 62', 66', 72'; Inglis 77'; Goals: Thurston (6/10)	Report

Sydney Football Stadium, Sydney
Attendance: 15,855
Referee: Ashley Klein (England)
Player of the Match: Billy Slater (Australia)

==== Final ====
22 November 2008
19:00 AEST (UTC+10:00)

Australia	20–34	New Zealand
Tries: Lockyer 11', 35'; Williams 15'; Inglis 64'; Goals: Thurston (2/4)	Report	Tries: Hohaia 53', 70' (pen.); Smith 24'; Ropati 28'; Marshall 60'; Blair 75'; Goals: Luke (3/3); Marshall (2/3)

Lang Park, Brisbane
Attendance: 50,599
Referee: Ashley Klein (England)
Player of the Match: Darren Lockyer

=== Women's World Cup ===
==== Pool A ====
Team	Pld	W	D	L	PF	PA	PD	Pts
Australia	3	3	0	0	154	4	+150	6
England	3	2	0	1	130	26	+104	4
Russia	3	1	0	2	18	156	-138	2
France	3	0	0	3	16	132	-116	0

6 November 2008
15:30 AEST (UTC+10)

England	72 – 0	Russia
	Report

Stockland Park, Sunshine Coast
Referee: Belinda Sharpe

6 November 2008
18:30 AEST (UTC+10)

Australia	60 – 0	France
	Report

Stockland Park, Sunshine Coast
Referee: Michael Sims

8 November 2008
13:30 AEST (UTC+10)

England	54 – 4	France
Tries: Gemma Walsh 3 Claire Hall 2 Rachel Twibill; Amanda Donaldson; Natalie Gilmour; Sophie Lazenby; Michelle Greenwood	Report

Kawana Sports Precinct, Sunshine Coast (Note: Three pool matches were played at Kawana Sports Precinct due to scheduling conflicts with the adjacent Stockland Park.)
Referee: Marilyn McKenna

8 November 2008
16:30 AEST (UTC+10)

Australia	72 – 0	Russia

Stockland Park, Sunshine Coast
Referee: Amie Gibson

10 November 2008
15:30 AEST (UTC+10)

France	12 – 18	Russia

Kawana Sports Precinct, Sunshine Coast
Referee: Marilyn McKenna

10 November 2008
17:00 AEST (UTC+10)

Australia	22 – 4	England
Tries: Teresa Anderson 2 Teina Clark; Jo Barrett; Goals: Teina Clark 2 Tegan Rolfe	Reports	Tries: Rachel Twibill

Stockland Park, Sunshine Coast
Referee: Kasey Badger

==== Pool B ====
Team	Pld	W	D	L	PF	PA	PD	Pts
New Zealand	3	3	0	0	140	8	+132	6
Pacific Islands	3	2	0	1	70	108	-38	4
Samoa	3	1	0	2	66	52	+14	2
Tonga	3	0	0	3	18	126	-108	0

6 November 2008
14:00 AEST (UTC+10)

New Zealand	72 – 0	Pacific Islands
Tries: Honey Hireme (4); Sarina Fiso (2); Trish Hina (2); Luisa Avaiki; Emma Cairns; Cynthia Ta'ala; Rona Peters; Kristina Sue; Goals: Laura Mariu (10/13)	Video

Kawana Sports Precinct, Sunshine Coast
Referee: Amie Gibson

6 November 2008
17:00 AEST (UTC+10)

Tonga	0 – 40	Samoa

Stockland Park, Sunshine Coast
Referee: Marilyn McKenna

8 November 2008
12:00 AEST (UTC+10)

New Zealand	42 – 4	Tonga
Tries: Sharlene Johnson (4); Emma Cairns; Sarina Fiso; Ana Pereira; Tasha Tapu; Maia Tua-Davidson; Goals: Trish Hina (3)	Video

Stockland Park, Sunshine Coast
Referee: Michael Fuller

8 November 2008
13:30 AEST (UTC+10)

Samoa	22 – 26	Pacific Islands

Stockland Park, Sunshine Coast
Referee: Kasey Badger

10 November 2008
12:30 AEST (UTC+10)

New Zealand	26 – 4	Samoa
Tries: Honey Hireme (2); Lisa Campbell; Kathleen Keremete; Cynthia Ta'ala; Goals: Trish Hina (3)	Video

Stockland Park, Sunshine Coast
Referee: Belinda Sharpe

10 November 2008
14:00 AEST (UTC+10)

Tonga	14 – 44	Pacific Islands

Stockland Park, Sunshine Coast
Referee: Amie Gibson

==== Consolation play-offs ====
12 November 2008
11:00 AEST (UTC+10)

Samoa	32 – 0	France
	Result

Stockland Park, Sunshine Coast
Referee: Kasey Badger

12 November 2008
12:30 AEST (UTC+10)

Russia	24 – 12	Tonga
	Result

Stockland Park, Sunshine Coast
Referee: Marilyn McKenna

==== Semi-finals ====
12 November 2008
15:30 AEST (UTC+10)

New Zealand	16 – 4	England
Tries: Tafale Chan Ting; Kat Whata-Simpkins; Honey Hireme; Goals: Trish Hina (2)	Video; Reports	Tries: Michelle Greenwood

Stockland Park, Sunshine Coast
Referee: Chris Treneman

12 November 2008
18:30 AEST (UTC+10)

Australia	32 – 6	Pacific Islands
Tries: Steph Hancock (2); Teina Clark; Karyn Murphy; Deanna Turner; Tarah Westera; Goals: Teina Clark (4)	Report	Tries: Watson; Goals: Nella

Stockland Park, Sunshine Coast
Referee: Rod Tolley

==== Seventh place ====
14 November 2008
15:00 AEST (UTC+10)

France	34 – 4	Tonga
	Result

Stockland Park, Sunshine Coast
Referee: Amie Gibson

==== Fifth place ====
14 November 2008
16:30 AEST (UTC+10)

Samoa	52 – 8	Russia
	Result

Stockland Park, Sunshine Coast
Referee: Belinda Sharpe

==== Third place ====
14 November 2008
18:00 AEST (UTC+10)

England	24 – 0	Pacific Islands
Tries: Natalie Gilmour; Michelle Greenwood; Sophie Lazenby; Rachel Twibill; Joanne Watmore; Goals: Andrea Dobson (2)	Reports

Stockland Park, Sunshine Coast
Referee: Kasey Badger

==== Final ====
15 November 2008
16:40 AEST (UTC+10)

Australia	0 – 34	New Zealand
	Reports; Video	Tries: Hina (2), Whata-Simpkins (2), Avaiki, Tapu, Tua-Davidson; Goals: Hina (3)

Suncorp Stadium, Brisbane
Referee: Rod Tolley
