= 2013 Women's Rugby League World Cup squads =

This article lists the official squads for the 2013 Women's Rugby League World Cup.

== Squads ==
=== Australia ===
Australia played four matches in the tournament. They were coached by Paul Dyer. Karyn Murphy and Tahnee Norris were captain and vice-captain, or co-captains. The Australian team for the tournament was, as follows:

Jersey Number	Heritage Number	Player	Position	Club (NSW) / Region (Qld)	State	Debut	M	T	G	Pts
18	124	Emily Andrews	Centre, Wing	Helensburgh Tigers	NSW	2013	1	0	0	0
15	114	Heather Ballinger	Prop	Cairns	Qld	2011	4	1	0	4
4	81	Joanne Barrett	Centre	Brighton	Qld	2007	3	1	0	4
1	120	Samantha Hammond	Fullback	Helensburgh Tigers	NSW	2013	3	8	0	32
6	103	Ali Brigginshaw	Five-eighth	Ripley	Qld	2009	4	0	15	30
2	119	Karina Brown	Wing, Fullback	Queensland	Qld	2013	2	0	0	0
21	125	Tegan Chandler	Wing	Helensburgh Tigers	NSW	2013	1	0	0	0
9	2	Natalie Dwyer	Hooker	Augustine Hills	Qld	1995	3	0	0	0
8	75	Steph Hancock	Prop	Killarney	Qld	2003	3	2	0	8
3	121	Jenni-Sue Hoepper	Centre, Halfback	Springfield	Qld	2013	4	3	0	12
12	94	Renae Kunst	Second-row	West End	Qld	2008	4	0	0	0
7	42	Karyn Murphy	Halfback	West End	Qld	1998	3	0	0	0
13	43	Tahnee Norris	Lock	Robina	Qld	1998	3	0	0	0
5	97	Jessica Palmer	Wing, Centre	Penrith Brothers	NSW	2008	4	1	0	4
17	122	Ruan Sims	Prop	Cronulla-Carringbah Sharks	NSW	2013	3	0	0	0
20	116	Alexandra Sulusi	Second-row	Canley Heights Dragons	NSW	2011	3	0	0	0
22	123	Emma Tonegato	Wing	Helensburgh Tigers	NSW	2013	3	3	0	12
11	100	Deanna Turner	Second-row	Mackay	Qld	2008	2	0	0	0
16	112	Elianna Walton	interchange	Canley Heights Dragons	NSW	2009	4	0	0	0
23	79	Tarah Westera	interchange	Penrith Brothers	NSW	2003	3	2	0	8
19	126	Emma-Marie Young	Second-row, Prop	Maitland Pickers	NSW	2013	1	0	0	0
14	117	Julie Young	Hooker	Maitland Pickers	NSW	2011	4	0	0	0
10	118	Rebecca Young	Prop	Maitland Pickers	NSW	2011	3	0	0	0
	—	Amber Saltner	Wing	Cherbourg	Qld	—	0	0	0	0

=== England ===
England played four matches during the tournament. They were coached by Chris Chapman and captained by Natalie Gilmour. The England team was as follows:

Player	Position	Club	Debut	M	T	G	Pts
Lindsay Anfield	Fullback	Normanton	2007	3	1	1	6
Danielle Bound	Hooker	Thatto Heath Crusaders	2012	4	1	0	4
Katie Cooper-Birkenhead	Halfback	Featherstone Rovers	2013	2	1	0	4
Jodie Cunningham	Wing	Thatto Heath Crusaders	2010	3	2	0	8
Andrea Dobson	Prop	Featherstone Rovers	2007	3	0	0	0
Kim Field	Prop	Featherstone Rovers	2010	2	0	0	0
Lois Forsell	interchange	Bradford Thunderbirds	2010	3	0	0	0
Holly Freestone	Second-row	Thatto Heath Crusaders	2010	3	0	0	0
Natalie Gilmour	Centre	Featherstone Rovers	2007	4	3	16	44
Claire Hall	Hooker	Thatto Heath Crusaders	2007	2	0	0	0
Amy Hardcastle	Centre	Bradford Thunderbirds	2009	4	4	0	16
Lori Holloran	Loose forward	Normanton	2013	1	0	0	0
Clare McGinnis	Prop	Thatto Heath Crusaders	2013	4	3	0	12
Kirsty Moroney	Halfback	Bradford Thunderbirds	2008	4	1	0	4
Holly Myers	Wing	Coventry/Southampton	2013	2	3	0	12
Emily Rudge	Loose forward	Thatto Heath Crusaders	2008	4	0	0	0
Emma Slowe	Prop	Featherstone Rovers	2007	4	0	0	0
Lauren Stallwood	Wing	Bradford Thunderbirds	2012	3	0	0	0
Tara-Jane Stanley	Fullback	Crosfields	2012	1	1	0	4
Beth Sutcliffe	Second-row	Thatto Heath Crusaders	2007	4	0	0	0
Dannielle Titterington	Wing	Featherstone Rovers	2007	1	1	0	4
Rachel Twibill	Second-row	Bradford Thunderbirds	2007	3	0	0	0
Gemma Walsh	Stand-off	Thatto Heath Crusaders	2007	3	0	0	0
Jenny Welsby	Stand-off	Thatto Heath Crusaders	2013	2	0	0	0

=== France ===
France played four matches during the tournament. The team was coached by Olivier Janzac. The French team were the only team to not select the permitted 24 players. They selected 23. The one try scored by France during the tournament was registered by Elisa Ciria. The French squad was as follows: (Note: The squad list on the Festival of World Cups website does not match with the squad list on the FFR website or the match reports on the European Rugby League website which list all 23 players for France's first match against New Zealand, rather than just the 17 that played.)

Player	Club
Houita Benchoug	Toulouse Ovalie
Jayne-Marie Bentley	Pujols
Nazrati Boina	Marseille
Cassandre Campanella	Facture Biganos
Élisa Ciria	Facture Biganos
Rachel Cousseau	Facture Biganos
Ambre Decarnin	Pujols
Angélique Degas	Facture Biganos
Gaelle Delas	Facture Biganos
Estelle Fauvelle	Marseille
Laurianne Guigue	13 Provençal
Mélanie Jean	Facture Biganos
Delphine Lacoste	Pujols
Audrey Lenet	Lescure
Sandrine Lloria	Pujols
Coralie Maurouard	Lescure
Anais Mikalef	Facture Biganos
Ludivine Miorin	Pujols
Mira M'raidi	13 Provençal
Elodie Pittana	XIII Catalan
Maud Signoret	Marseille
Alice Varela	Pujols
Sonia Zaghdoudi	Toulouse Ovalie

=== New Zealand ===
New Zealand played four matches during the tournament. They were coached by Lynley Tierney-Mani and captained by Honey Hireme. Teina Clark was selected in the squad but did not travel to England due to suspension. The New Zealand team was as follows:

Jersey Number	Heritage Number	Player	Position	Zone	Debut	M	T	G	Pts
16	102	Charlotte Arnopp-Scanlan	Prop, Second-row	Auckland	2013	3	1	0	4
12	90	Lisa Campbell	Centre, Hooker, Second-row	Auckland	2008	4	1	3	10
—	103	Teina Clark	—	Mid Central	2013	0	0	0	0
	104	Brenda Collins	Centre	Wellington	2013	1	0	0	0
	34	Tasha Davie (Tapu)	Fullback, Wing	Auckland	1998	2	0	0	0
2	77	Sarina Fiso	Fullback, Centre	Counties Manukau	2005	4	4	0	16
15	78	Aimee Gilbert	Wing	Wellington	2005	3	1	0	4
17	105	Amber Hall	interchange	Auckland	2013	4	2	0	8
17	55	Maryanne Hemara	Prop	Counties Manukau	2001	2	0	0	0
3	62	Honey Hireme	Centre	Counties Manukau	2002	4	7	0	28
8	63	Annabelle Hohepa	Prop	Auckland	2002	1	0	0	0
11	91	Kathleen Keremete	Second-row	Counties Manukau	2008	4	1	0	4
18	106	Nora Maaka	Five-eighth	Counties Manukau	2013	3	2	0	8
24	107	Kelly Maipi	Prop	Counties Manukau	2013	4	2	0	8
6	48	Laura Mariu	Five-eighth	Counties Manukau	2000	2	1	10	24
19	108	Simone Panapa	interchange	Counties Manukau	2013	3	0	0	0
13	98	Akenese Pereira	Lock, Second-row	Wellington	2010	3	2	0	8
14	109	Kahurangi Peters	Lock	Counties Manukau	2013	4	1	0	4
7	75	Rona Peters	Halfback	Counties Manukau	2004	4	0	0	0
5	100	Karley Te Kawa	Wing	Counties Manukau	2010	3	4	0	16
10	82	Ana Tuia (Pereira)	Prop	Wellington	2005	3	0	0	0
20	110	Geneva Webber	Wing	Wellington	2013	3	0	1	2
9	101	Sharnita Woodman	Hooker	Counties Manukau	2010	3	1	0	4
21	111	Chanelle Wright	Wing	Counties Manukau	2013	1	0	0	0
