= 2008 Women's Rugby League World Cup =

Third staging of the Women's Rugby League World Cup

2008 Women's World Cup
- Number of teams: 8
- Host country: Australia
- Winner: New Zealand (3rd title)
- Runner-up: Australia
- Matches played: 20
- Points scored: 728 (36.4 per match)

The 2008 Women's Rugby League World Cup was the third staging of the Women's Rugby League World Cup since its inauguration in 2000. The tournament was held from 6 November, culminating in the final between Australia and New Zealand on 15 November. It was held at Stockland Park alongside the Police World Cup. Eight teams took part including defending champions New Zealand.

== Officiating ==
All referees used at the tournament were Australian.

- Kasey Badger nee Campbell (New South Wales)
- Michael Fuller (Queensland)
- Amie Gibson (New South Wales)
- Marilyn McKenna (Queensland)
- Belinda Sharpe nee Sleeman (Queensland)
- Michael Sims (Western Australia)
- Rod Tolley (Queensland)
- Chris Treneman (New South Wales)

== Group stage ==
=== Pool A ===
| Team | Pld | W | D | L | PF | PA | PD | Pts |
|---|---|---|---|---|---|---|---|---|
| Australia | 3 | 3 | 0 | 0 | 154 | 4 | +150 | 6 |
| England | 3 | 2 | 0 | 1 | 130 | 26 | +104 | 4 |
| Russia | 3 | 1 | 0 | 2 | 18 | 156 | -138 | 2 |
| France | 3 | 0 | 0 | 3 | 16 | 132 | -116 | 0 |

6 November 2008
15:30 AEST (UTC+10)

| England | 72 – 0 | Russia |
|---|---|---|
| | Report |

Stockland Park, Sunshine Coast
Referee: Belinda Sharpe

6 November 2008
18:30 AEST (UTC+10)

| Australia | 60 – 0 | France |
|---|---|---|
| | Report |

Stockland Park, Sunshine Coast
Referee: Michael Sims

8 November 2008
13:30 AEST (UTC+10)

| England | 54 – 4 | France |
|---|---|---|
| Tries: Gemma Walsh 3 Claire Hall 2 Rachel Twibill; Amanda Donaldson; Natalie Gilmour; Sophie Lazenby; Michelle Greenwood | Report |

Kawana Sports Precinct, Sunshine Coast (Note: Three pool matches were played at Kawana Sports Precinct due to scheduling conflicts with the adjacent Stockland Park.)
Referee: Marilyn McKenna

8 November 2008
16:30 AEST (UTC+10)

| Australia | 72 – 0 | Russia |

Stockland Park, Sunshine Coast
Referee: Amie Gibson

10 November 2008
15:30 AEST (UTC+10)

| France | 12 – 18 | Russia |

Kawana Sports Precinct, Sunshine Coast
Referee: Marilyn McKenna

10 November 2008
17:00 AEST (UTC+10)

| Australia | 22 – 4 | England |
|---|---|---|
| Tries: Teresa Anderson 2 Teina Clark; Jo Barrett; Goals: Teina Clark 2 Tegan Rolfe | Reports | Tries: Rachel Twibill |

Stockland Park, Sunshine Coast
Referee: Kasey Badger

=== Pool B ===
| Team | Pld | W | D | L | PF | PA | PD | Pts |
|---|---|---|---|---|---|---|---|---|
| New Zealand | 3 | 3 | 0 | 0 | 140 | 8 | +132 | 6 |
| Pacific Islands | 3 | 2 | 0 | 1 | 70 | 108 | -38 | 4 |
| Samoa | 3 | 1 | 0 | 2 | 66 | 52 | +14 | 2 |
| Tonga | 3 | 0 | 0 | 3 | 18 | 126 | -108 | 0 |

6 November 2008
14:00 AEST (UTC+10)

| New Zealand | 72 – 0 | Pacific Islands |
|---|---|---|
| Tries: Honey Hireme (4); Sarina Fiso (2); Trish Hina (2); Luisa Avaiki; Emma Cairns; Cynthia Ta'ala; Rona Peters; Kristina Sue; Goals: Laura Mariu (10/13) | Video |

Kawana Sports Precinct, Sunshine Coast
Referee: Amie Gibson

6 November 2008
17:00 AEST (UTC+10)

| Tonga | 0 – 40 | Samoa |

Stockland Park, Sunshine Coast
Referee: Marilyn McKenna

8 November 2008
12:00 AEST (UTC+10)

| New Zealand | 42 – 4 | Tonga |
|---|---|---|
| Tries: Sharlene Johnson (4); Emma Cairns; Sarina Fiso; Ana Pereira; Tasha Tapu; Maia Tua-Davidson; Goals: Trish Hina (3) | Video |

Stockland Park, Sunshine Coast
Referee: Michael Fuller

8 November 2008
13:30 AEST (UTC+10)

| Samoa | 22 – 26 | Pacific Islands |

Stockland Park, Sunshine Coast
Referee: Kasey Badger

10 November 2008
12:30 AEST (UTC+10)

| New Zealand | 26 – 4 | Samoa |
|---|---|---|
| Tries: Honey Hireme (2); Lisa Campbell; Kathleen Keremete; Cynthia Ta'ala; Goals: Trish Hina (3) | Video |

Stockland Park, Sunshine Coast
Referee: Belinda Sharpe

10 November 2008
14:00 AEST (UTC+10)

| Tonga | 14 – 44 | Pacific Islands |

Stockland Park, Sunshine Coast
Referee: Amie Gibson

== Consolation play-offs ==
12 November 2008
11:00 AEST (UTC+10)

| Samoa | 32 – 0 | France |
|---|---|---|
| | Result |

Stockland Park, Sunshine Coast
Referee: Kasey Badger

12 November 2008
12:30 AEST (UTC+10)

| Russia | 24 – 12 | Tonga |
|---|---|---|
| | Result |

Stockland Park, Sunshine Coast
Referee: Marilyn McKenna

== Semi-finals ==
12 November 2008
15:30 AEST (UTC+10)

| New Zealand | 16 – 4 | England |
|---|---|---|
| Tries: Tafale Chan Ting; Kat Whata-Simpkins; Honey Hireme; Goals: Trish Hina (2) | Video; Reports | Tries: Michelle Greenwood |

Stockland Park, Sunshine Coast
Referee: Chris Treneman

12 November 2008
18:30 AEST (UTC+10)

| Australia | 32 – 6 | Pacific Islands |
|---|---|---|
| Tries: Steph Hancock (2); Teina Clark; Karyn Murphy; Deanna Turner; Tarah Westera; Goals: Teina Clark (4) | Report | Tries: Watson; Goals: Nella |

Stockland Park, Sunshine Coast
Referee: Rod Tolley

== Seventh place ==
14 November 2008
15:00 AEST (UTC+10)

| France | 34 – 4 | Tonga |
|---|---|---|
| | Result |

Stockland Park, Sunshine Coast
Referee: Amie Gibson

== Fifth place ==
14 November 2008
16:30 AEST (UTC+10)

| Samoa | 52 – 8 | Russia |
|---|---|---|
| | Result |

Stockland Park, Sunshine Coast
Referee: Belinda Sharpe

== Third place ==
14 November 2008
18:00 AEST (UTC+10)

| England | 24 – 0 | Pacific Islands |
|---|---|---|
| Tries: Natalie Gilmour; Michelle Greenwood; Sophie Lazenby; Rachel Twibill; Joanne Watmore; Goals: Andrea Dobson (2) | Reports |

Stockland Park, Sunshine Coast
Referee: Kasey Badger

== Final ==
The final was held at Suncorp Stadium on 15 November.

15 November 2008
16:40 AEST (UTC+10)

| Australia | 0 – 34 | New Zealand |
|---|---|---|
| | Reports; Video | Tries: Hina (2), Whata-Simpkins (2), Avaiki, Tapu, Tua-Davidson; Goals: Hina (3) |

Suncorp Stadium, Brisbane
Referee: Rod Tolley
