= List of Italy women's national rugby union team matches =

The following is a list of Italy women's national rugby union team international matches.

== Overall ==
Italy's overall international match record against all nations, updated to 7 September 2025, is as follows:

| | Games Played | Won | Drawn | Lost | Percentage of wins |
| Total | 202 | 76 | 4 | 122 | 37.62% |

See Women's international rugby for information about the status of international games and match numbering.

== Full internationals ==
=== Legend ===
| Won | Lost | Draw |

=== 1980s ===
| Test | Date | Opponent | F | A | Venue | Event |
|---|---|---|---|---|---|---|
| 1 | 22 June 1985 | France | 0 | 0 | Stadio Italo Nicoletti, Riccione | |
| 2 | 18 May 1986 | France | 0 | 12 | Bardos | |
| 3 | 17 May 1987 | France | 4 | 16 | Rome | |
| 4 | 21 May 1988 | Great Britain | 9 | 32 | Bourg-en-Bresse | 1988 European Cup |
| 5 | 22 May 1988 | France | 3 | 16 | Bourg-en-Bresse | 1988 European Cup |
| 6 | 23 May 1988 | Netherlands | 6 | 10 | Bourg-en-Bresse | 1988 European Cup |

=== 1990s ===
| Test | Date | Opponent | F | A | Venue | Event |
|---|---|---|---|---|---|---|
| 7 | 18 March 1990 | Great Britain | 0 | 32 | Moseley | |
| 8 | 8 April 1991 | England | 9 | 25 | Llanharan | 1991 World Cup |
| 9 | 10 April 1991 | Spain | 7 | 13 | Glamorgan Wanderers, Cardiff | 1991 World Cup |
| 10 | 11 April 1991 | Sweden | 18 | 0 | Cardiff | 1991 World Cup |
| 11 | 12 April 1991 | Canada | 0 | 6 | Cardiff | 1991 World Cup |
| 12 | 13 March 1993 | Netherlands | 8 | 5 | Stadio Comunale, Rho | |
| 13 | 4 April 1993 | France | 0 | 24 | Rovigo | |
| 14 | 12 April 1995 | Spain | 0 | 5 | Trévise | 1995 European Championship |
| 15 | 16 April 1995 | Netherlands | 23 | 19 | Trévise | 1995 European Championship |
| 16 | 30 April 1995 | Scotland | 12 | 10 | Meggetland, Edinburgh | |
| 17 | 8 April 1996 | France | 0 | 53 | Madrid | 1996 European Championship |
| 18 | 12 April 1996 | Netherlands | 11 | 6 | Madrid | 1996 European Championship |
| 19 | 13 April 1996 | Germany | 39 | 0 | Madrid | 1996 European Championship |
| 20 | 2 April 1997 | Scotland | 7 | 31 | Nice | 1997 European Championship |
| 21 | 4 April 1997 | Ireland | 13 | 5 | Nice | 1997 European Championship |
| 22 | 6 April 1997 | Netherlands | 24 | 26 | Nice | 1997 European Championship |
| 23 | 2 May 1998 | Scotland | 8 | 37 | Amsterdam | 1998 World Cup |
| 24 | 5 May 1998 | Germany | 34 | 5 | Amsterdam | 1998 World Cup |
| 25 | 9 May 1998 | Russia | 51 | 7 | Amsterdam | 1998 World Cup |
| 26 | 12 May 1998 | Ireland | 5 | 20 | Amsterdam | 1998 World Cup |
| 27 | 15 May 1998 | Wales | 10 | 12 | Amsterdam | 1998 World Cup |
| 28 | 19 April 1999 | Scotland | 15 | 43 | Belluno | 1999 European Championship |
| 29 | 21 April 1999 | Wales | 17 | 28 | Belluno | 1999 European Championship |
| 30 | 24 April 1999 | Netherlands | 50 | 18 | Belluno | 1999 European Championship |

=== 2000s ===
| Test | Date | Opponent | F | A | Venue | Event |
|---|---|---|---|---|---|---|
| 31 | 8 May 2000 | Spain | 16 | 58 | Roquetas | 2000 European Championship |
| 32 | 10 May 2000 | Wales | 24 | 25 | El Ejido | 2000 European Championship |
| 33 | 13 May 2000 | Germany | 27 | 5 | Roquetas | 2000 European Championship |
| 34 | 6 May 2001 | Spain | 3 | 34 | Lille | 2001 European Championship |
| 35 | 10 May 2001 | Kazakhstan | 0 | 20 | Lille | 2001 European Championship |
| 36 | 12 May 2001 | Ireland | 8 | 9 | Lille | 2001 European Championship |
| 37 | 20 March 2002 | Germany | 16 | 0 | San Donà | 2002 European Nations Cup |
| 38 | 23 March 2002 | Sweden | 35 | 24 | Treviso | 2002 European Nations Cup |
| 39 | 13 May 2002 | England | 9 | 63 | Barcelona | 2002 World Cup |
| 40 | 17 May 2002 | Japan | 30 | 3 | Barcelona | 2002 World Cup |
| 41 | 20 May 2002 | Wales | 3 | 35 | Barcelona | 2002 World Cup |
| 42 | 24 May 2002 | Kazakhstan | 3 | 20 | Barcelona | 2002 World Cup |
| 43 | 1 May 2003 | Spain | 5 | 29 | Malmö | 2003 European Championship |
| 44 | 3 May 2003 | Sweden | 10 | 15 | Malmö | 2003 European Championship |
| 45 | 2 May 2004 | England | 7 | 73 | Toulouse | 2004 European Championship |
| 46 | 5 May 2004 | Ireland | 5 | 14 | Toulouse | 2004 European Championship |
| 47 | 8 May 2004 | Sweden | 13 | 0 | Toulouse | 2004 European Championship |
| 48 | 4 April 2005 | Germany | 52 | 0 | Hamburg | 2005 European Championship |
| 49 | 9 April 2005 | Netherlands | 22 | 3 | Hamburg | 2005 European Championship |
| 50 | 22 October 2005 | Wales | 11 | 14 | Treviso | |
| 51 | 23 April 2006 | Belgium | 34 | 0 | San Dona Di Piave | 2006 European Nations Cup |
| 52 | 23 April 2006 | Russia | 30 | 0 | San Dona Di Piave | 2006 European Nations Cup |
| 53 | 26 April 2006 | Sweden | 33 | 0 | San Dona Di Piave | 2006 European Nations Cup |
| 54 | 30 April 2006 | Netherlands | 28 | 7 | San Dona Di Piave | 2006 European Nations Cup |
| 55 | 18 November 2006 | Wales | 7 | 31 | Glamorgan Wanderers, Cardiff | |
| 56 | 4 February 2007 | France | 17 | 37 | Biella | 2007 Six Nations |
| 57 | 10 February 2007 | England | 0 | 23 | Twickenham Stadium, London | 2007 Six Nations |
| 58 | 24 February 2007 | Scotland | 6 | 26 | Meggetland Stadium, Edinburgh | 2007 Six Nations |
| 59 | 11 March 2007 | Wales | 10 | 24 | Rome | 2007 Six Nations |
| 60 | 17 March 2007 | Ireland | 12 | 17 | Tre Fontane, Rome | 2007 Six Nations |
| 61 | 28 April 2007 | Spain | 6 | 15 | Barcelona | 2007 European Championship |
| 62 | 30 April 2007 | England | 11 | 41 | Barcelona | 2007 European Championship |
| 63 | 2 May 2007 | Russia | 50 | 5 | Barcelona | 2007 European Championship |
| 64 | 5 May 2007 | Sweden | 0 | 6 | Barcelona | 2007 European Championship |
| 65 | 1 February 2008 | Ireland | 0 | 19 | St Mary's RFC, Dublin | 2008 Six Nations |
| 66 | 9 February 2008 | England | 6 | 76 | Rome | 2008 Six Nations |
| 67 | 24 February 2008 | Wales | 5 | 27 | Taffs Well RFC, Taff's Well | 2008 Six Nations |
| 68 | 8 March 2008 | France | 6 | 35 | Valence, Lyon | 2008 Six Nations |
| 69 | 16 March 2008 | Scotland | 31 | 10 | Mira | 2008 Six Nations |
| 70 | 7 February 2009 | England | 13 | 69 | London Welsh, London | 2009 Six Nations |
| 71 | 14 February 2009 | Ireland | 17 | 35 | Stadio M. Natali, Colleferro | 2009 Six Nations |
| 72 | 28 February 2009 | Scotland | 10 | 13 | Meggetland Stadium, Edinburgh | 2009 Six Nations |
| 73 | 15 March 2009 | Wales | 7 | 29 | Mira | 2009 Six Nations |
| 74 | 22 March 2009 | France | 10 | 14 | Turin | 2009 Six Nations |
| 75 | 17 May 2009 | Sweden | 14 | 16 | Stockholm | 2009 European Trophy |
| 76 | 20 May 2009 | Germany | 47 | 9 | Enköping | 2009 European Trophy |
| 77 | 23 May 2009 | Spain | 7 | 12 | Stockholm | 2009 European Trophy |

=== 2010s ===
| Test | Date | Opponent | F | A | Venue | Event |
|---|---|---|---|---|---|---|
| 78 | 5 February 2010 | Ireland | 5 | 22 | Ashbourne RFC, Ashbourne | 2010 Six Nations |
| 79 | 13 February 2010 | England | 0 | 41 | Stadio Nando Capra, Noceto | 2010 Six Nations |
| 80 | 28 February 2010 | Scotland | 6 | 6 | Stadio Maurizio Natali, Rome | 2010 Six Nations |
| 81 | 13 March 2010 | France | 14 | 45 | Stade Yves-du-Manoir, Montpellier | 2010 Six Nations |
| 82 | 21 March 2010 | Wales | 19 | 15 | Brewery Field, Bridgend | 2010 Six Nations |
| 83 | 8 May 2010 | Germany | 43 | 0 | Sélestat | 2010 European Trophy |
| 84 | 10 May 2010 | Russia | 33 | 0 | Colmar | 2010 European Trophy |
| 85 | 12 May 2010 | Sweden | 10 | 0 | Haguenau | 2010 European Trophy |
| 86 | 15 May 2010 | Spain | 13 | 31 | Stade de la Meinau, Strasbourg | 2010 European Trophy |
| 87 | 6 February 2011 | Ireland | 5 | 26 | Rovigo | 2011 Six Nations |
| 88 | 12 February 2011 | England | 5 | 68 | Molsey Road, Esher | 2011 Six Nations |
| 89 | 27 February 2011 | Wales | 12 | 8 | Viareggio, Tuscany | 2011 Six Nations |
| 90 | 13 March 2011 | France | 20 | 28 | Benevento | 2011 Six Nations |
| 91 | 20 March 2011 | Scotland | 26 | 0 | Meggetland Stadium, Edinburgh | 2011 Six Nations |
| 92 | 29 October 2011 | France | 0 | 37 | Stade des Arboras, Nice | |
| 93 | 5 February 2012 | France | 0 | 32 | Stade Emile Pons, Riom | 2012 Six Nations |
| 94 | 12 February 2012 | England | 3 | 43 | Rino Venegoni Stadium, Milan | 2012 Six Nations |
| 95 | 24 February 2012 | Ireland | 10 | 40 | Ashbourne RFC, Ashbourne | 2012 Six Nations |
| 96 | 10 March 2012 | Wales | 13 | 30 | Millennium Stadium, Cardiff | 2012 Six Nations |
| 97 | 18 March 2012 | Scotland | 29 | 12 | Pagani Stadium, Rovato | 2012 Six Nations |
| 98 | 13 May 2012 | France | 19 | 22 | Rovereto, Italy | 2012 European Championship |
| 99 | 16 May 2012 | England | 8 | 32 | Rovereto | 2012 European Championship |
| 100 | 19 May 2012 | Spain | 54 | 3 | Rovereto | 2012 European Championship |
| 101 | 18 November 2012 | United States | 20 | 34 | Centro Sportivo di Roma, Rome | |
| 102 | 13 December 2012 | Spain | 29 | 12 | Centro di Preparazione Olimpica, Rome | |
| 103 | 2 February 2013 | France | 13 | 12 | Rovato, Brescia | 2013 Six Nations |
| 104 | 10 February 2013 | Scotland | 8 | 0 | Mayfield, Dundee | 2013 Six Nations |
| 105 | 24 February 2013 | Wales | 15 | 16 | Benevento | 2013 Six Nations |
| 106 | 9 March 2013 | England | 0 | 34 | Molesey Road, Esher | 2013 Six Nations |
| 107 | 17 March 2013 | Ireland | 3 | 6 | Parabiago, Milan | 2013 Six Nations |
| 108 | 20 April 2013 | Samoa | 65 | 22 | Madrid | 2014 World Cup Q |
| 109 | 23 April 2013 | Scotland | 27 | 3 | Madrid | 2014 World Cup Q |
| 110 | 27 April 2013 | Spain | 7 | 38 | Madrid | 2014 World Cup Q |
| 111 | 2 February 2014 | Wales | 12 | 11 | Talbot Athletic Ground, Port Talbot | 2014 Six Nations |
| 112 | 8 February 2014 | France | 0 | 29 | Stade Ernest-Argelès, Blagnac | 2014 Six Nations |
| 113 | 23 February 2014 | Scotland | 45 | 5 | Stadio Parco Urbano | 2014 Six Nations |
| 114 | 8 March 2014 | Ireland | 0 | 39 | Aviva Stadium, Dublin | 2014 Six Nations |
| 115 | 16 March 2014 | England | 0 | 24 | Giulio e Silvio Pagani, Rovato | 2014 Six Nations |
| 116 | 23 November 2014 | Scotland | 27 | 3 | Avezzano | |
| 117 | 6 February 2015 | Ireland | 5 | 30 | Florence | 2015 Six Nations |
| 118 | 15 February 2015 | England | 7 | 39 | Twickenham Stoop, London | 2015 Six Nations |
| 119 | 1 March 2015 | Scotland | 31 | 8 | Broadwood Stadium, Scotland | 2015 Six Nations |
| 120 | 14 March 2015 | France | 17 | 12 | Badia Polesine, Rovigo | 2015 Six Nations |
| 121 | 21 March 2015 | Wales | 23 | 5 | Stadio Plebiscito, Padua | 2015 Six Nations |
| 122 | 6 February 2016 | France | 0 | 39 | Stade Marcel-Verchère, Bourg-en-Bresse | 2016 Six Nations |
| 123 | 13 February 2016 | England | 24 | 33 | Stadio Gino Pistoni, Turin | 2016 Six Nations |
| 124 | 28 February 2016 | Scotland | 22 | 7 | Stadio Arcoveggio, Bologna | 2016 Six Nations |
| 125 | 13 March 2016 | Ireland | 3 | 14 | Donnybrook Stadium, Dublin | 2016 Six Nations |
| 126 | 20 March 2016 | Wales | 16 | 12 | Talbot Athletic Ground, Port Talbot | 2016 Six Nations |
| 127 | 3 February 2017 | Wales | 8 | 20 | Stadio Pacifico Carotti, Iesi | 2017 Six Nations |
| 128 | 12 February 2017 | Ireland | 3 | 27 | Stadio Tommaso Fattori, L'Aquila | 2017 Six Nations |
| 129 | 25 February 2017 | England | 15 | 29 | Twickenham Stoop, London | 2017 Six Nations |
| 130 | 12 March 2017 | France | 5 | 28 | Stadio Sergio Lanfranchi, Parma | 2017 Six Nations |
| 131 | 17 March 2017 | Scotland | 12 | 14 | Broadwood Stadium, Cumbernauld | 2017 Six Nations |
| 132 | 9 August 2017 | United States | 12 | 24 | UCD Bowl, Dublin | 2017 World Cup |
| 133 | 13 August 2017 | England | 13 | 56 | Billings Park UCD, Dublin | 2017 World Cup |
| 134 | 17 August 2017 | Spain | 8 | 22 | UCD Bowl, Dublin | 2017 World Cup |
| 135 | 22 August 2017 | Japan | 22 | 0 | Queen's University Belfast, Belfast | 2017 World Cup |
| 136 | 26 August 2017 | Spain | 20 | 15 | Queen's University Belfast, Belfast | 2017 World Cup |
| 137 | 19 November 2017 | France | 21 | 41 | Biella | |
| 138 | 4 February 2018 | England | 7 | 42 | Stadio Mirabello, Reggio Emilia | 2018 Six Nations |
| 139 | 11 February 2018 | Ireland | 8 | 21 | Donnybrook Stadium, Dublin | 2018 Six Nations |
| 140 | 24 February 2018 | France | 0 | 57 | Stade Furiani, Furiani | 2018 Six Nations |
| 141 | 11 March 2018 | Wales | 22 | 15 | Millennium Stadium, Cardiff | 2018 Six Nations |
| 142 | 18 March 2018 | Scotland | 26 | 12 | Stadio Plebiscito, Padua | 2018 Six Nations |
| 143 | 4 November 2018 | Scotland | 38 | 0 | Calvisano | |
| 144 | 25 November 2018 | South Africa | 35 | 10 | Prato | |
| 145 | 1 February 2019 | Scotland | 28 | 7 | Scotstoun Stadium, Glasgow | 2019 Six Nations |
| 146 | 9 February 2019 | Wales | 3 | 3 | Stadio Via del mare, Lecce | 2019 Six Nations |
| 147 | 23 February 2019 | Ireland | 29 | 27 | Stadio Sergio Lanfranchi, Parma | 2019 Six Nations |
| 148 | 9 March 2019 | England | 0 | 55 | Sandy Park, Exeter | 2019 Six Nations |
| 149 | 17 March 2019 | France | 31 | 12 | Stadio Plebiscito, Padua | 2019 Six Nations |
| 150 | 16 November 2019 | Japan | 17 | 17 | Stadio Fattori, L'Aquila | |
| 151 | 23 November 2019 | England | 3 | 60 | Goldington Road, Bedford | |

=== 2020–2021 ===
| Test | Date | Opponent | F | A | Venue | Event |
|---|---|---|---|---|---|---|
| 152 | 2 February 2020 | Wales | 19 | 15 | Cardiff Arms Park, Cardiff | 2020 Six Nations |
| 153 | 8 February 2020 | France | 10 | 45 | Stade Beaublanc, Limoges | 2020 Six Nations |
| 154 | 24 February 2020 | Ireland | 7 | 21 | Donnybrook Stadium, Dublin | 2020 Six Nations |
| 155 | 1 November 2020 | England | 0 | 54 | Stadio Sergio Lanfranchi, Parma | 2020 Six Nations |
| 156 | 10 April 2021 | England | 3 | 67 | Stadio Sergio Lanfranchi, Parma | 2021 Six Nations |
| 157 | 17 April 2021 | Scotland | 41 | 20 | Scotstoun Stadium, Glasgow | 2021 Six Nations |
| 158 | 24 April 2021 | Ireland | 5 | 25 | Donnybrook Stadium, Dublin | 2021 Six Nations |
| 159 | 13 September 2021 | Scotland | 38 | 13 | Stadio Sergio Lanfranchi, Parma | 2021 World Cup Q |
| 160 | 19 September 2021 | Ireland | 7 | 15 | Stadio Sergio Lanfranchi, Parma | 2021 World Cup Q |
| 161 | 25 September 2021 | Spain | 34 | 10 | Stadio Sergio Lanfranchi, Parma | 2021 World Cup Q |

=== 2022 ===
| Test | Date | Opponent | F | A | Venue | Event |
|---|---|---|---|---|---|---|
| 162 | 27 March 2022 | France | 6 | 39 | Stade des Alpes, Grenoble | 2022 Six Nations |
| 163 | 3 April 2022 | England | 0 | 74 | Stadio Sergio Lanfranchi, Parma | 2022 Six Nations |
| 164 | 10 April 2022 | Ireland | 8 | 29 | Musgrave Park, Cork | 2022 Six Nations |
| 165 | 23 April 2022 | Scotland | 20 | 13 | Stadio Sergio Lanfranchi, Parma | 2022 Six Nations |
| 166 | 30 April 2022 | Wales | 10 | 8 | Cardiff Arms Park, Cardiff | 2022 Six Nations |
| 167 | 24 July 2022 | Canada | 24 | 34 | Starlight Stadium, Langford | 2021 World Cup warm-up |
| 168 | 3 September 2022 | France | 0 | 21 | Stade des Arboras, Nice | 2021 World Cup warm-up |
| 169 | 9 September 2022 | France | 26 | 19 | Stadio del Rugby, Biella | 2021 World Cup warm-up |
| 170 | 9 October 2022 | United States | 22 | 10 | Okara Park, Whangārei | 2021 World Cup |
| 171 | 16 October 2022 | Canada | 12 | 22 | The Trusts Arena, Auckland | 2021 World Cup |
| 172 | 23 October 2022 | Japan | 21 | 8 | The Trusts Arena, Auckland | 2021 World Cup |
| 173 | 29 October 2022 | France | 3 | 39 | Okara Park, Whangārei | 2021 World Cup |

=== 2023 ===
| Test | Date | Opponent | F | A | Venue | Event |
|---|---|---|---|---|---|---|
| 174 | 26 March 2023 | France | 12 | 22 | Stadio Sergio Lanfranchi, Parma | 2023 Six Nations |
| 175 | 2 April 2023 | England | 5 | 68 | Franklin's Gardens, Northampton | 2023 Six Nations |
| 176 | 15 April 2023 | Ireland | 24 | 7 | Stadio Sergio Lanfranchi, Parma | 2023 Six Nations |
| 177 | 22 April 2023 | Scotland | 22 | 29 | Edinburgh Rugby Stadium, Edinburgh | 2023 Six Nations |
| 178 | 29 April 2023 | Wales | 10 | 36 | Stadio Sergio Lanfranchi, Parma | 2023 Six Nations |
| 179 | 22 July 2023 | Spain | 23 | 0 | Stadio Walter Beltrametti, Piacenza | 2023 WXV Q |
| 180 | 30 September 2023 | Japan | 24 | 25 | Stadio Sergio Lanfranchi, Parma | 2023 WXV warm-up |
| 181 | 13 October 2023 | Japan | 28 | 15 | Danie Craven Stadium, Stellenbosch | 2023 WXV 2 |
| 182 | 20 October 2023 | South Africa | 36 | 18 | Athlone Stadium, Cape Town | 2023 WXV 2 |
| 183 | 28 October 2023 | United States | 30 | 8 | Athlone Stadium, Cape Town | 2023 WXV 2 |

=== 2024 ===
| Test | Date | Opponent | F | A | Venue | Event |
|---|---|---|---|---|---|---|
| 184 | 24 March 2024 | England | 0 | 48 | Stadio Sergio Lanfranchi, Parma | 2024 Six Nations |
| 185 | 31 March 2024 | Ireland | 27 | 21 | RDS Arena, Dublin | 2024 Six Nations |
| 186 | 14 April 2024 | France | 15 | 38 | Stade Jean-Bouin, Paris | 2024 Six Nations |
| 187 | 20 April 2024 | Scotland | 10 | 17 | Stadio Sergio Lanfranchi, Parma | 2024 Six Nations |
| 188 | 27 April 2024 | Wales | 20 | 22 | Millennium Stadium, Cardiff | 2024 Six Nations |
| 189 | 14 September 2024 | Japan | 24 | 8 | Stadio Walter Beltrametti, Piacenza | |
| 190 | 28 September 2024 | Scotland | 0 | 19 | DHL Stadium, Cape Town | 2024 WXV 2 |
| 191 | 5 October 2024 | Wales | 8 | 5 | Athlone Stadium, Cape Town | 2024 WXV 2 |
| 192 | 12 October 2024 | South Africa | 23 | 19 | Athlone Stadium, Cape Town| | 2024 WXV 2 |

=== 2025 ===
| Test | Date | Opponent | F | A | Venue | Event |
|---|---|---|---|---|---|---|
| 193 | 23 March 2025 | England | 5 | 38 | York Community Stadium, York | 2025 Six Nations |
| 194 | 30 March 2025 | Ireland | 12 | 54 | Stadio Sergio Lanfranchi, Parma | 2025 Six Nations |
| 195 | 13 April 2025 | Scotland | 25 | 17 | Edinburgh Rugby Stadium, Edinburgh | 2025 Six Nations |
| 196 | 19 April 2025 | France | 21 | 34 | Stadio Sergio Lanfranchi, Parma | 2025 Six Nations |
| 197 | 26 April 2025 | Wales | 44 | 12 | Stadio Sergio Lanfranchi, Parma | 2025 Six Nations |
| 198 | 25 July 2025 | Scotland | 34 | 29 | Stadio Luigi Zaffanella, Viadana | 2025 World Cup Warm-Ups |
| 199 | 9 August 2025 | Japan | 33 | 15 | Stadio San Michele, Calvisano | 2025 World Cup Warm-Ups |
| 200 | 23 August 2025 | France | 0 | 24 | Sandy Park, Exeter | 2025 World Cup |
| 201 | 31 August 2025 | South Africa | 24 | 29 | York Community Stadium, York | 2025 World Cup |
| 202 | 7 September 2025 | Brazil | 64 | 3 | Franklin's Gardens, Northampton | 2025 World Cup |

=== 2026 ===
| Test | Date | Opponent | PF | PA | Venue | Event |
|---|---|---|---|---|---|---|
| 203 | 11 April 2026 | France | TBD | TBD | Stade des Alpes, Grenoble | 2026 Six Nations |
| 204 | 18 April 2026 | Ireland | TBD | TBD | Dexcom Stadium, Galway | 2026 Six Nations |
| 205 | 25 April 2026 | Scotland | TBD | TBD | Stadio Sergio Lanfranchi, Parma | 2026 Six Nations |
| 206 | 9 May 2026 | England | TBD | TBD | Stadio Sergio Lanfranchi, Parma | 2026 Six Nations |
| 207 | 17 May 2026 | Wales | TBD | TBD | Cardiff Arms Park, Cardiff | 2026 Six Nations |

== Other matches ==
| Date | Italy | Score | Opponent | Venue | Event |
|---|---|---|---|---|---|
| 2000-03-31 | Italy | 50–21 | Catalonia | Aubagne, France | |
| 2000-04-02 | Italy | 11–22 | France A | Marseille | |
| 2006-02-12 | Italy | 10–17 | England A | Imber Court | |
| 2008-12-12 | Italy A | 10–20 | England Development | London Welsh | |
| 2008-12-14 | Italy | 0–20 | England A | Old Deer Park | |
| 2011-04-30 | Italy A | 0–5 | England A | University of Coruña | 2011 FIRA Trophy |
| 2011-05-02 | Italy A | 34–0 | Russia | Fortecarmoa, Vilagarcía | 2011 FIRA Trophy |
| 2011-05-04 | Italy A | 17–20 | Netherlands | A Malata, Ferrol | 2011 FIRA Trophy |
| 2011-05-07 | Italy A | 7–17 | France A | University of Coruña | 2011 FIRA Trophy |
