= 2015 Anzac Test =

Australia	New Zealand
12	26
	1	2	Total
AUS	6	6	12
NZL	26	0	26
- Date: 3 May 2015
- Stadium: Suncorp Stadium
- Location: Brisbane, Australia
- Manu Vatuvei
- Referee: Gerard Sutton (Australia)
- Attendance: 32,681

Broadcast partners
- Broadcasters: Nine Network (AUS) Sky Sport (NZ)
- Commentators: Ray Warren; Phil Gould; Peter Sterling; Wally Lewis

The 2015 Anzac Test was a rugby league test match played between Australia and New Zealand at Suncorp Stadium in Brisbane. It was the 16th Anzac Test played between the two nations since the first was played under the Super League banner in 1997. Both sides were announced on 26 April. The game was originally scheduled to take place on 1 May, but it was postponed due to bad weather. The Test instead took place on May 3, along with a Women's rugby league match between the Australian Jillaroos and New Zealand Kiwi Ferns which served as the curtain-raiser for the main game, won 22-14 by the Jillaroos.

New Zealand's win was their first Anzac Test win in 17 years, and the first time New Zealand had won three consecutive test matches over Australia since 1953.

As man of the match, Manu Vatuvei was awarded the Charles Savory medal.

== Pre-game ==
=== National anthems ===
- Russ Walker - New Zealand National Anthem
- (Australia) Adrian Li Donni - Australian National Anthem

== Squads ==
Australia	Position	New Zealand
Greg Inglis^{1}	Fullback	Roger Tuivasa-Sheck
Josh Dugan	Wing	^{2}Jason Nightingale
Will Chambers	Centre	Shaun Kenny-Dowall
Michael Jennings	Centre	Peta Hiku
Alex Johnston	Wing	Manu Vatuvei
Johnathan Thurston	Five-Eighth	Kieran Foran
Cooper Cronk	Halfback	Shaun Johnson
Matt Scott	Prop	Jesse Bromwich
Cameron Smith (c)	Hooker	Issac Luke
Aaron Woods	Prop	Ben Matulino
Greg Bird	2nd Row	Tohu Harris
Sam Thaiday	2nd Row	Kevin Proctor
Corey Parker	Lock	Simon Mannering (c)
Luke Lewis	Interchange	Thomas Leuluai
Trent Merrin	Interchange	Martin Taupau
Nate Myles	Interchange	Sam Moa
James Tamou	Interchange	Greg Eastwood
Tim Sheens	Coach	Stephen Kearney

^{1} - Shifted to Fullback taking the place of originally selected Billy Slater who withdrew due to injury. Michael Jennings was promoted from originally 19th Man to Centre.
^{2} - Replaced originally selected Dallin Watene-Zelezniak who was withdrawn due to suspension.

- Daly Cherry-Evans and Josh Papalii were a part of the Kangaroos squad but did not play in the match.
- Lewis Brown and Kodi Nikorima were a part of the Kiwis squad but did not play in the match.

== Match summary ==
3 May 2015
4:15pm (AEST)

Australia	12 – 26	New Zealand
Tries: Sam Thaiday (13') 1 Will Chambers (59') 1 Goals: Johnathan Thurston 2/2 (14', 59')		Tries: Manu Vatuvei (20', 28') 2 Shaun Johnson (31') 1 Shaun Kenny-Dowall (40') 1 Goals: Shaun Johnson 5/6 (8' pen, 29', 33', 39' pen, 40')

Suncorp Stadium, Brisbane
Attendance: 32,681
Referee: Gerard Sutton (Australia)
Player of the Match: Manu Vatuvei

== Women's Test ==
2015 Anzac Test
Australia	New Zealand
22	14
	1	2	Total
AUS	10	12	22
NZL	4	10	14
- Date: 3 May 2015
- Stadium: Suncorp Stadium
- Location: Milton, Brisbane, Australia

Broadcast partners
- Broadcasters: (Australia) Nine Network
- Commentators: Ben Dobbin Darren Lockyer Jo Barrett

A Women's rugby league match between the Australian Jillaroos and New Zealand Kiwi Ferns which served as the curtain-raiser for the main game, won 22-14 by the Jillaroos.

=== Women's squads ===
Australia	Position	New Zealand
Samantha Hammond	Fullback	Janna Vaughan
Karina Brown	Wing	Atawhai Tupaea
Annette Brander	Centre	Nora Maaka
Mahalia Murphy	Centre	Tasha Davie
Latoya Billy	Wing	Shontelle Dudley
Jenny-Sue Hoepper	Five-Eighth	Laura Mariu (c)
Ali Brigginshaw	Halfback	Rona Peters
Steph Hancock (c)	Prop	Kelly Maipi
Brittany Breayley	Hooker	Sharnita Woodman
Heather Ballinger	Prop	Krystal Murray
Kezie Apps	2nd Row	Teuila Fotu-Moala
Renae Kunst	2nd Row	Hilda Peters
Ruan Sims	Lock	Kahurangi Peters
Vanessa Foliaki	Interchange	Georgia Hale
Tallisha Harden	Interchange	Maitua Feterika
Casy Karklis	Interchange	Annabelle Hohepa
Simaima Taufa-Kautai	Interchange	Krystal Rota
Steve Folkes	Coach	Alan Jackson

== Match summary ==
3 May 2015
2.00pm (AEST)

Australia	22 – 14	New Zealand
Tries: Mahalia Murphy (14' 61' 69') 3 Jenni-Sue Hoepper (3') 1 Goals: Ali Brigginshaw (4') 1 Jenni-Sue Hoepper (68' pen, 71') 2	Report; Video	Tries: Shontelle Woodman (22', 77') 2 Maitua Feterika (51') 1 Goals: Laura Mariu (52') 1/3

Suncorp Stadium, Brisbane
Referee: Jarrad Cole
