= 2013 Women's European Qualification Tournament =

Coordinates: 40°26′16.23″N 3°43′42.75″W

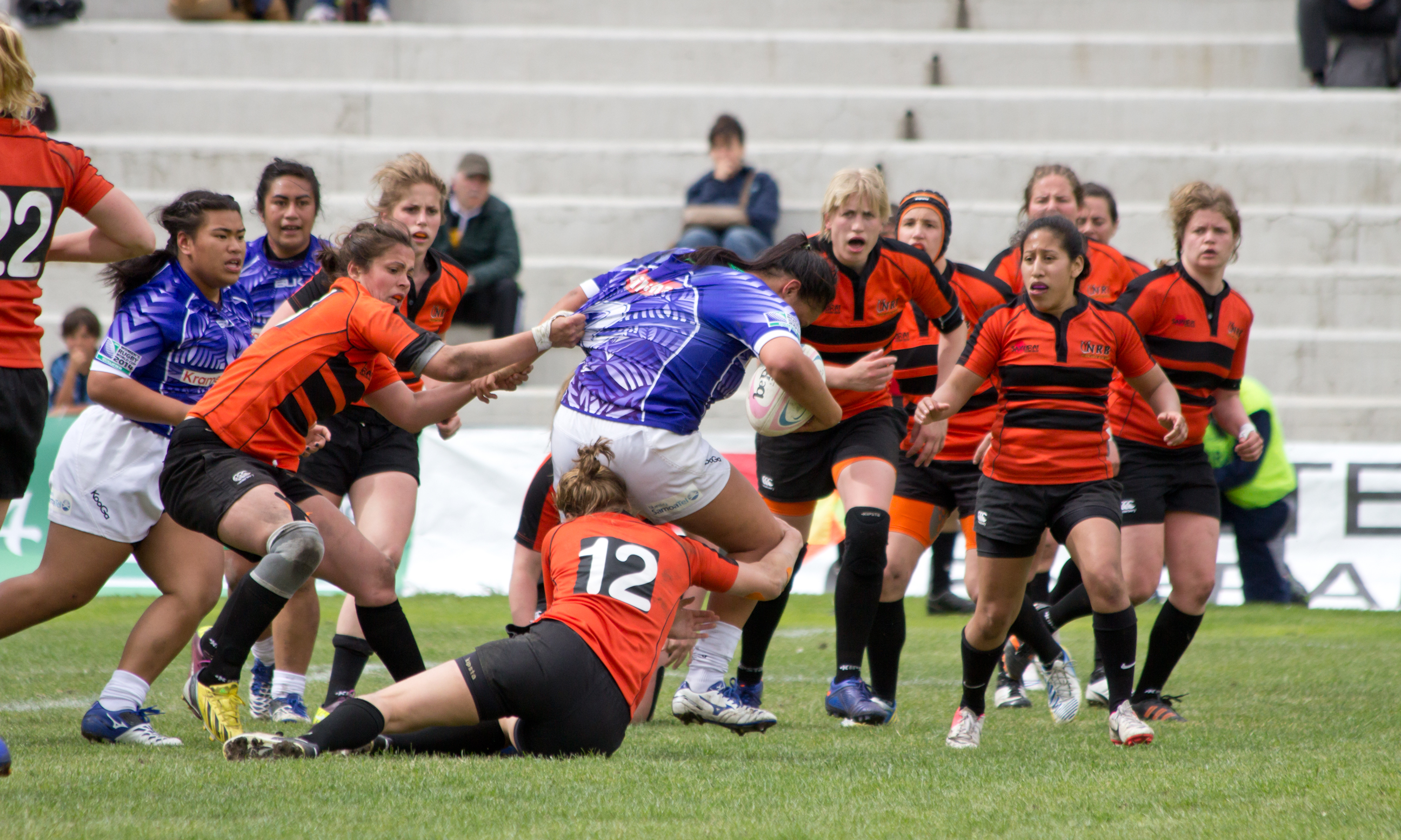

Tournament details
- Host nation: Spain
- Dates: 2013-4-20 – 2013-4-27
- No. of nations: 6

Final positions
- Champions: Spain
- Runner-up: Samoa

Tournament statistics
- Matches played: 9
- Top scorer(s): (Spain) Patricia García (50)
- Most tries: (Scotland) Megan Gaffney (5)

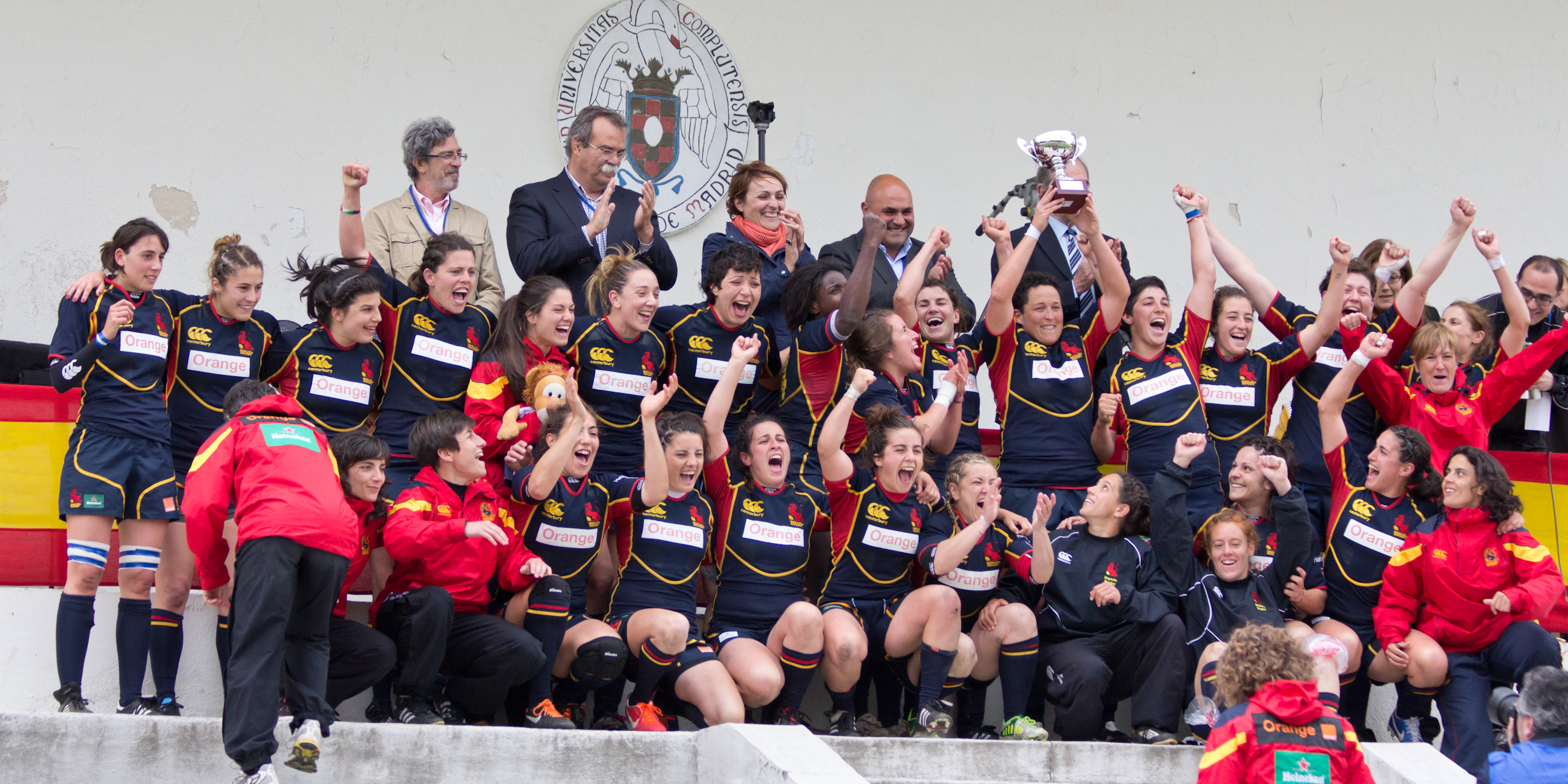
Spain celebrating its victory at 2013 WEQT.

The 2013 Women's Qualification Tournament was the 18th annual rugby tournament organised by FIRA for the continent's national teams and also a qualification tournament for 2014 Women's Rugby World Cup. Six teams took part - the fifth and sixth ranked teams from the Six Nations, based on 2012 and 2013 results, Italy and Scotland; the finalist from the 2012 European Championship, Spain (the winner, England, being already qualified); the two finalists from 2012 European Group B, Sweden and the Netherlands; and Oceania's entrant Samoa, who were disputing a qualification place from one of the European teams.

The trophy was won by Spain, with Samoa in second place. These two teams qualified for the World Cup the following year in France. The Spanish won their qualification on the final day by beating Italy, who had been leading the provisional rankings, by a score of 38–7.

== Format ==
The tournament used a split pool format. The six teams were seeded and divided into two pools of three. The teams played one match against each of the teams in the opposite pool. The tournament rankings were determined based on the number of points accumulated from each match.

2013 tournament ranking – combined pools
#	Team	P	W	D	L	PF	PA	TB	LB	Pts
1	Spain	3	3	0	0	171	7	3	0	15
2	Samoa	3	2	0	1	84	69	3	0	11
3	Scotland	3	2	0	1	95	42	2	0	10
4	Italy	3	2	0	1	99	62	1	0	9
5	Netherlands	3	0	0	3	21	138	0	0	0
6	Sweden	3	0	0	3	8	147	0	0	0

== Round one ==
20 April 2013

Italy	65–22	Samoa
Sara Barattin 16'; Michela Este 20'; Manuela Furlan 26'; Flavia Severin 32', 38', 45'; Penalty try 43'; Michela Sillari 51'; Cecilia Zublena 57'; Veronica Schiavon 68'; Cons: Veronica Schiavon 16', 26', 43', 45', 51', 57'; Pens: Veronica Schiavon 24'		Soteria Pulumu 64', 77'; Taimua Taiao 73'; Alix Leaupepe 80'; Cons: Kally Leota 80'

Ciudad Universitaria, Madrid
Referee: Andrew Jackson (ENG)

FB	15	Manuela Furlan
RW	14	Michela Sillari
OC	13	Maria Frazia Cioffi
IC	12	Paola Zangirolami
LW	11	Maria Diletta Veronese	(substituted off) 41'
FH	10	Veronica Schiavon
SH	9	Sara Barattin	(substituted off) 56'
N8	8	Flavia Severin	(substituted off) 55'
OF	7	Cecilia Zublena (c)
BF	6	Michela Este	(substituted off) 56'
RL	5	Alice Trevisan
LL	4	Cristina Molic
TP	3	Lucia Gai	(substituted off) 46'
HK	2	Melissa Bettoni	(substituted off) 59'
LP	1	Marta Ferrari	(substituted off) 46'
Replacements:
HK	16	Debora Ballarini	(substituted on) 59'
PR	17	Awa Coulibaly	(substituted on) 46'
PR	18	Sara Zanon	(substituted on) 46'
LK	19	Alessia Pantarotto	(substituted on) 55'
FL	20	Ilaria Arrighetti	(substituted on) 56'
SH	21	Silvia Gaudino
FH	22	Michela Tondinelli	(substituted on) 56'
CE	23	Sofia Stefan	(substituted on) 41'
Coach:
(Italy) Andrea Di Giandomenico

FB	15	Maitua Feterika	(substituted off) 45'
RW	14	Soteria Pulumu
OC	13	Merenaite Collins
IC	12	Merenaite Faitala-Mariner
LW	11	Justine Iopu Luatua
FH	10	Kally Leota
SH	9	Cesca Luafalealo	(substituted off) 45'
N8	8	Cynthia Ta'ala (c)
OF	7	Rita Lilii	(substituted off) 46'
BF	6	Sally Kaokao	(substituted off) 46'
RL	5	Taalili Iosefo	(substituted off) 41'
LL	4	Hellen Tafa
TP	3	Rona Mulitalo	(substituted off) 51'
HK	2	Ginia Muavae	(substituted off) 51'
LP	1	Tessa Wright	(substituted off) 57'
Replacements:
HK	16	Luisa Avaiki	(substituted on) 57'
PR	17	Barbara Tyrell-Tuuga	(substituted on) 51'
PR	18	Cynthia Apineru	(substituted on) 51'
LK	19	Apaula Kerisiano	(substituted on) 41'
FL	20	Alix Leaupepe	(substituted on) 46'
SH	21	Roseanne Leaupepe	(substituted on) 45'
FH	22	Taimua Taiao	(substituted on) 45'
CE	23	Tracy Helleur	(substituted on) 46'
Coach:
(Samoa) Peter Fatialofa

20 April 2013

Netherlands	7–29	Scotland
Try:: Mireille Nieuwenhuis 22'; Cons: Rita G. Wiri 22'		Tries:Megan Gaffney 7', 43'; Sarah Dixon 28'; Susie Brown 66'; Tanya Griffith 78'; Cons: Gillian Inglis 66', 78'

Ciudad Universitaria, Madrid
Referee: Maxime Chalon (FRA)

FB	15	Fenna Stomps
RW	14	Mireille Nieuwenhuis
OC	6	Marlieke Broer
IC	12	Liz Van Erp		(substituted off) 52'
LW	11	Alexia Mavroudis
FH	10	Rita Wiri
SH	9	Gisella Kleinen
N8	8	Shereza Pool
OF	7	Imara van Loon		(substituted off) 62'	(substituted on) 73'
BF	13	Christy van Oorschot		(substituted off) 30'
RL	5	Mirjam Steenbeek
LL	4	Asia Udding
TP	3	Sylke Haverkorn	(yellow card) 59' to 69'	(substituted off) 59'
HK	2	Petra Zwart (c)
LP	1	Xandra Benthem de Grave		(substituted off) 52'
Replacements:
HK	16	Laurijn Draaisma		(substituted on) 62'	(substituted off) 73'
PR	17	Nienke Ruepert		(substituted on) 59'
PR	18	Maaike Loth		(substituted on) 30'
LK	19	Aukje Lingsma
FL	20	Yael Belder		(substituted on) 73'
SH	21	Esperanza Bleijenburg		(substituted on) 52'
FH	22	Emma Hulshof		(substituted on) 56'
CE	23	Jannicke Ijdens		(substituted on) 52'
Coach:
(Netherlands) DJ Verlinden

FB	15	Katy Green	(yellow card) 54' to 64'
RW	14	Lyndsay O'Donnell		(substituted off) 63'
OC	13	Sarah Dixon
IC	12	Gillian Inglis
LW	11	Megan Gaffney	(yellow card) 27' to 37'
FH	10	Tanya Griffith
SH	9	Elizabeth Dalgliesh		(substituted off) 41'
N8	8	Susie Brown (c)		(substituted off) 69'
OF	7	Tess Forsberg		(substituted off) 69'
BF	6	Kelly Francis		(substituted off) 28'
RL	5	Rebecca Parker
LL	4	Lindsay Wheeler
TP	3	Tracey Balmer
HK	2	Lindsey Smith		(substituted off) 62'
LP	1	Suzanne McKerlie-Hex		(substituted off) 52'
Replacements:
HK	16	Heather Lockhart		(substituted on) 52'
PR	17	Beth Dickens
PR	18	Nikki McLeod		(substituted on) 62'
LK	19	Bridget Millar-Mills		(substituted on) 69'
FL	20	Samantha Beal		(substituted on) 28'
SH	21	Sarah Law		(substituted on) 41'
FH	22	Lisa Martin		(substituted on) 63'
CE	23	Laura Steven
Coach:
(Scotland) Karen Findlay

20 April 2013

Sweden	0–55	Spain
		Tries: Laura Esbrí 13', 34'; Marina Bravo 15'; Elisabeth Martínez 21'; Ana Mª Aigneren 38'; Patricia García 45'; Rocío García 58'; Elena Redondo 63'; Julià Plà 67'; Cons: Patricia García 13', 15', 45', 58', 67'

Ciudad Universitaria, Madrid
Referee: Nigel Correl (IRE)

FB	15	Amanda Sandsborg
RW	14	Kerstin Lövendahl	30' to 37'	(substituted off) 46'
OC	13	Jennie Olsson	(substituted off) 72'
IC	12	Erika Andersson
LW	11	Jessica Melin
FH	10	Rebecca Kearney
SH	9	Sofia Gertz
N8	8	Elisabeth Ygge (c)
OF	7	Sara Sundström	(substituted off) 72'
BF	6	Emma Skagerlind	(substituted off) 46'
RL	5	Emilia Kristiansson	(substituted off) 72'
LL	4	Katarina Boman
TP	3	Viktoria Svangren	(substituted off) 72'
HK	2	Malin Johansson
LP	1	Annika Hector	(substituted off) 22'
Replacements:
HK	16	Mia Maurtisson	(substituted on) 72'
PR	17	Therese Nilsson
PR	18	Tove Viksten
LK	19	Micaela Francke-Rydén	(substituted on) 46'
FL	20	Sofia Bergvall	(substituted on) 72'
SH	21	Mimmie Mikaelsdotter Lind	(substituted on) 72'
FH	22	Carina Trinh	(substituted on) 30'	(substituted off) 37'	(substituted on) 46'
CE	23	Rebecka Sundell	(substituted on) 72'
Coach:
(Sweden) Andres Franco

FB	15	Irene Schiavon
RW	14	Laura Esbrí	(substituted off) 60'
OC	13	Marina Bravo
IC	12	Patricia García	(substituted off) 69'
LW	11	Elisabeth Martínez	(substituted off) 65'
FH	10	Ana Vanessa Rial
SH	9	Bárbara Plà	(substituted off) 69'
N8	8	Ana Mª Aigneren (c)
OF	7	Paula Medín Alevín
BF	6	Ángela Del Pan
RL	5	Rocío García	(substituted off) 72'
LL	4	Lía Bailán	(substituted off) 60'
TP	3	Elena Redondo	(substituted off) 68'
HK	2	Aroa González
LP	1	Mª Carmen Sequedo	(substituted off) 60'
Replacements:
HK	16	Alex Castillon	(substituted on) 72'
PR	17	Isabel Rico	(substituted on) 60'
PR	18	Clara Costa	(substituted on) 68'
LK	19	María Ribera	(substituted on) 60'
SH	20	Marta Cabané	(substituted on) 69'
FH	21	Helena Roca	(substituted on) 69'
CE	22	Berta García	(substituted on) 60'
WG	23	Julià Plà	(substituted on) 65'
Coach:
(Spain) Inés Etxegibel

== Round two ==
23 April 2013

Italy	27–3	Scotland
Tries:: Manuela Furlan 39', 42'; Sara Barattin 62'; Cons: Veronica Schiavon 40', 43', 63'; Pens: Veronica Schiavon 15', 51'		Pens: Louise Dalgliesh 30'

Ciudad Universitaria, Madrid
Referee: Maxime Charlon (FRA)

FB	15	Manuela Furlan
RW	14	Michela Sillari
OC	13	Maria Frazia Cioffi	(yellow card) 56' to 66'	(substituted off) 78'
IC	12	Paola Zangirolami (c)
LW	11	Maria Diletta Veronese		(substituted off) 41'
FH	10	Veronica Schiavon
SH	9	Sara Barattin
N8	8	Flavia Severin
OF	7	Cecilia Zublena		(substituted off) 66'
BF	6	Ilaria Arrighetti		(substituted off) 78'
RL	5	Alice Trevisan
LL	4	Cristina Molic
TP	3	Lucia Gai		(substituted off) 66'
HK	2	Melissa Bettoni		(substituted off) 78'
LP	1	Marta Ferrari
Replacements:
HK	16	Debora Ballarini		(substituted on) 59'
PR	17	Awa Coulibaly		(substituted on) 66'
PR	18	Sara Zanon		(substituted on) 78'
LK	19	Alessia Pantarotto		(substituted on) 66'
FL	20	Elisa Giordano		(substituted on) 78'
SH	21	Claudia Tedeschi
FH	22	Michela Tondinelli
CE	23	Sofia Stefan		(substituted on) 78'
Coach:
(Italy) Andrea Di Giandomenico

FB	15	Katy Green		(substituted off) 60'
RW	14	Sarah Dixon		(substituted off) 3'
OC	13	Annabel Sergeant
IC	12	Gillian Inglis
LW	11	Megan Gaffney		(substituted off) 76'
FH	10	Tanya Griffith
SH	9	Louise Dalgleish		(substituted off) 52'
N8	8	Susie Brown (c)
OF	7	Tess Forsberg
BF	6	Jade Konkel		(substituted off) 52'
RL	5	Rebecca Parker
LL	4	Lindsay Wheeler
TP	3	Tracey Balmer		(substituted off) 72'
HK	2	Lindsey Smith		(substituted off) 68'
LP	1	Heather Lockhart
Replacements:
HK	16	Suzanne McKerlie-Hex
PR	17	Nikki McLeod		(substituted on) 68'
PR	18	Beth Dickens		(substituted on) 72'
LK	19	Bridget Millar-Mills		(substituted on) 76'
FL	20	Samantha Beal		(substituted on) 52'
SH	21	Sarah Law		(substituted on) 52'
FH	22	Lisa Martin		(substituted on) 60'
CE	23	Lyndsay O'Donnell	(yellow card) 49' to 59'	(substituted on) 3'
Coach:
(Scotland) Karen Findlay

23 April 2013

Sweden	0–29	Samoa
		Tries: Makiroa Leota 10', 54'; Cynthia Ta'ala 15'; Tracy Helleur 31'; Merenaite Faitala-Mariner 34'; Cons: 'Alaiumu Sao Taliu 15', 31'

Ciudad Universitaria, Madrid
Referee: Pedro Munirello (POR)

FB	15	Amanda Sandsborg
RW	14	Jessica Melin
OC	13	Erika Andersson
IC	12	Jennie Olsson
LW	11	Kerstin Lövendahl
FH	10	Rebecca Kearney
SH	9	Sofia Gertz
N8	8	Katarina Boman
OF	7	Elisabeth Ygge (c)
BF	6	Emma Skagerlind
RL	5	Mimmie Mikaelsdotter Lind
LL	4	Sofia Bergvall	(substituted off) 65'
TP	3	Tove Viksten
HK	2	Viktoria Svangren	(substituted off) 65'
LP	1	Annika Hector	(substituted off) 41'
Replacements:
HK	16	Mia Maurtisson	(substituted on) 65'
PR	17	Therese Nilsson
PR	18	Malin Johansson	(substituted on) 41'
LK	19	Birgitta Fällström
FL	20	Rebecka Sundell
SH	21	Carina Trinh
FH	22	Sara Sundström	(substituted on) 65'
CE	23	Micaela Francke-Rydén
Coach:
(Sweden) Andres Franco

FB	15	Taiao Taimua
RW	14	Makiroa Leota
OC	13	Mary-Ann Collins	(substituted off) 60'
IC	12	Merenaite Faitala-Mariner
LW	11	Soteria Pulumu
FH	10	Alaiumu Sao Taliu	(substituted off) 72'
SH	9	Roseanne Leaupepe	(substituted off) 72'
N8	8	Alix Leaupepe	(substituted off) 62'
OF	7	Tracy Helleur
BF	6	Rita Lilii	(substituted off) 58'
RL	5	Cynthia Ta'ala (c)
LL	4	Hellen Tafa
TP	3	Rona Mulitalo	(substituted off) 66'
HK	2	Ginia Muavae	(substituted off) 66'
LP	1	Cynthia Apineru	(substituted off) 41'
Replacements:
HK	16	Tessa Wright	(substituted on) 62'
PR	17	Barbara Tyrell-Tuuga	(substituted on) 58'
PR	18	Luisa Avaiki	(substituted on) 72'
LK	19	Apaula Kerisiano	(substituted on) 72'
FL	20	Sally Kaokao	(substituted on) 60'
SH	21	Cesca Luafalealo	(substituted on) 66'
FH	22	Kally Leota	(substituted on) 66'
CE	23	Justine Manaia Iopu	(substituted on) 41'
Coach:
(Samoa) Peter Fatialofa

23 April 2013

Netherlands	0–78	Spain
		Tries: Elisabeth Martínez 6'; Bárbara Plà 11'; Marina Bravo 16', 69'; Patricia García 19'; María Ribera 21', 79'; Juliá Plá 40', 45', 73'; Elena Redondo 48'; María Casado 63'; Cons: Patricia García 11', 19', 26', 33', 40', 45'; Irene Schiavon 48', 73', 79'

Ciudad Universitaria, Madrid
Referee: Nigel Correl (IRL)

FB	15	Fenna Stomps
RW	14	Mireille Nieuwenhuis		(substituted off) 35'
OC	6	Marlieke Broer		(substituted off) 72'
IC	12	Aukje Lingsma
LW	11	Jannicke Ijdens		(substituted off) 58'
FH	10	Rita Wiri
SH	20	Yael Belder		(substituted off) 48'
N8	8	Shereza Pool
OF	7	Petra Zwart (c)
BF	13	Christy van Oorschot		(substituted off) 35'
RL	5	Asia Udding
LL	4	Maaike Loth	(yellow card) 67' to 77'
TP	3	Sylke Haverkorn		(substituted off) 79'
HK	2	Laurijn Draaisma		(substituted off) 79'
LP	1	Xandra Benthem de Grave		(substituted off) 48'
Replacements:
HK	16	Nienke Ruepert		(substituted on) 79'
PR	17	Esperanza Bleijenburg		(substituted on) 79'
PR	18	Irith Lely		(substituted on) 58'
LK	19	Imara van Loon		(substituted on) 48'
FL	9	Gisella Kleinen		(substituted on) 48'
SH	21	Liz Van Erp		(substituted on) 72'
FH	22	Alexia Mavroudis		(substituted on) 35'
CE	23	Mirjam Steenbeek		(substituted on) 35'
Coach:
(Netherlands) DJ Verlinden

FB	15	Laura Esbrí		(substituted off) 70'
RW	14	Elisabeth Martínez		(substituted off) 65'
OC	13	Marina Bravo
IC	12	Patricia García		(substituted off) 46'
LW	11	Julià Plà
FH	10	Ana Vanessa Rial
SH	9	Bárbara Plà		(substituted off) 49'
N8	8	Ana Mª Aigneren (c)		(substituted off) 55'
OF	7	Ángela Del Pan	(yellow card) 60' to 70'
BF	6	Paula Medín Alevín
RL	5	María Ribera
LL	4	Lía Bailán
TP	3	Rocío García		(substituted off) 70'
HK	2	Aroa González		(substituted off) 65'
LP	1	Elena Redondo		(substituted off) 55'
Replacements:
HK	16	Mª Carmen Sequedo		(substituted on) 55'
PR	17	Isabel Rico		(substituted on) 65'
LK	18	Alexandra Castillón		(substituted on) 70'
FL	19	María Casado		(substituted on) 55'
FH	20	Irene Schiavon		(substituted on) 46'
CT	21	Lourdes Alameda		(substituted on) 70'
WG	22	Berta García		(substituted on) 65'
SH	23	Marta Cabané		(substituted on) 49'
Coach:
(Spain) Inés Etxegibel

== Round three ==
27 April 2013

Sweden	8–63	Scotland
Tries: Malin Johansson 13'; Pens: Emma Skagerlind 27'		Tries: Megan Gaffney 7', 37', 70'; Annabel Sergeant 24',49'; Tanya Griffirh 28', 84', 87'; Susie Brown 33', 77'; Katy Green 67'; Cons: ' Sarah Law 29'; Louise Dalgliesh 77', 84', 88'

Ciudad Universitaria, Madrid
Referee: Andrew Jackson (ENG)

FB	15	Amanda Sandsborg		(substituted off) 75'
RW	14	Jessica Melin
OC	13	Erika Andersson	(yellow card) 79' to 89'
IC	12	Jennie Olsson		(substituted off) 70'
LW	11	Kerstin Lövendahl
FH	10	Rebecca Kearney
SH	9	Sofia Gertz (c)
N8	8	Katarina Boman
OF	7	Emma Skagerlind
BF	6	Sara Sundström		(substituted off) 41'
RL	5	Emilia Kristiansson		(substituted off) 41'
LL	4	Mimmie Mikaelsdotter Lind
TP	3	Tove Viksten		(substituted off) 75'
HK	2	Viktoria Svangren		(substituted off) 41'
LP	1	Malin Johansson		(substituted off) 57'
Replacements:
HK	16	Mia Maurtisson		(substituted on) 41'
PR	17	Therese Nilsson		(substituted on) 75'
PR	18	Annika Hector		(substituted on) 57'
LK	19	Birgitta Fällström		(substituted on) 75'
FL	20	Rebecka Sundell		(substituted on) 70'
SH	21	Carina Trinh
FH	22	Micaela Francke-Rydén		(substituted on) 41'
CE	23	Sofia Bergvall		(substituted on) 41'
Coach:
(Sweden) Andres Franco

FB	15	Katy Green
RW	14	Lyndsay O'Donnell	(substituted off) 81'
OC	13	Annabel Sergeant
IC	12	Gillian Inglis
LW	11	Megan Gaffney
FH	10	Tanya Griffith
SH	9	Sarah Law	(substituted off) 63'
N8	8	Lindsay Wheeler
OF	7	Tess Forsberg
BF	6	Susie Brown (c)
RL	5	Rebecca Parker	(substituted off) 41'
LL	4	Samantha Beal	(substituted off) 19'
TP	3	Tracey Balmer	(substituted off) 78'
HK	2	Lindsey Smith	(substituted off) 72'
LP	1	Heather Lockhart	(substituted off) 78'
Replacements:
HK	16	Suzanne McKerlie-Hex	(substituted on) 78'
PR	17	Sarah Quick	(substituted on) 72'
PR	18	Beth Dickens	(substituted on) 78'
LK	19	Bridget Millar-Mills	(substituted on) 19'
FL	20	Jade Konkel	(substituted on) 41' (substituted off) 81'
SH	21	Nikki McLeod	(substituted on) 81'
FH	22	Louise Dalgleish	(substituted on) 63'
CE	23	Laura Steven	(substituted on) 81'
Coach:
(Scotland) Karen Findlay

27 April 2013

Netherlands	14–33	Samoa
Tries: Alexia Mavroudis 65'; Rita Wiri 75'; Cons: Rita Wiri 65', 75'		Tries: Hellen Tafa 13'; Alix Leaupepe 18'; Soteria Pulumu 27'; Justine Manaia Iopu 32', 58'; Cons: Alaiumu Sao Taliu 13', 18', 32'; Kally Leota 58'

Ciudad Universitaria, Madrid
Referee: Nigel Correl (IRL)

FB	15	Fenna Stomps
RW	14	Emma Claire Hulshof	(substituted off) 37'
OC	6	Marlieke Broer
IC	12	Aukje Lingsma
LW	11	Alexia Mavroudis
FH	10	Rita Wiri
SH	21	Yael Belder	(substituted off) 32'
N8	5	Asia Udding	(substituted off) 48'
OF	7	Liz Van Erp
BF	13	Christy van Oorschot
RL	8	Shereza Pool	(substituted off) 63'
LL	4	Mirjam Steenbeek
TP	3	Sylke Haverkorn	(substituted off) 75'
HK	2	Petra Zwart (c)
LP	1	Xandra Benthem de Grave	(substituted off) 72'
Replacements:
HK	16	Esperanza Bleijenburg	(substituted on) 72'
PR	17	Nienke Ruepert
PR	18	Mireille Nieuwenhuis	(substituted on) 63'
LK	19	Laurijn Draaisma
FL	20	Irith Lely	(substituted on) 75'
SH	9	Gisella Kleinen	(substituted on) 32'
FH	22	Jannicke Ijdens	(substituted on) 37'
CE	23	Maaike Loth	(substituted on) 48'
Coach:
(Netherlands) DJ Verlinden

FB	15	Taiao Taimua		(substituted off) 63'
RW	14	Soteria Pulumu
OC	13	Mary-Ann Collins	(yellow card) 50' to 60'
IC	12	Merenaite Faitala-Mariner
LW	11	Justine Manaia Iopu
FH	10	Alaiumu Sao Taliu		(substituted off) 48'
SH	9	Roseanne Leaupepe		(substituted off) 56'
N8	8	Alix Leaupepe		(substituted off) 59'
OF	7	Tracy Helleur		(substituted off) 59'
BF	6	Rita Lilii
RL	5	Cynthia Ta'ala (c)
LL	4	Hellen Tafa		(substituted off) 63'
TP	3	Rona Mulitalo		(substituted off) 63'
HK	2	Ginia Muavae
LP	1	Cynthia Apineru		(substituted off) 56'
Replacements:
HK	16	Tessa Wright		(substituted on) 56'
PR	17	Monique Hiku		(substituted on) 63'
PR	18	Luisa Avaiki		(substituted on) 59'
LK	19	Apaula Kerisiano		(substituted on) 63'
FL	20	Sally Kaokao		(substituted on) 59'
SH	21	Cesca Luafalealo		(substituted on) 56'
FH	22	Kally Leota		(substituted on) 48'
CE	23	Makiroa Leota		(substituted on) 63'
Coach:
(Samoa) Peter Fatialofa

27 April 2013

Italy	7–38	Spain
Tries: Silvia Gaudino 69'; Cons: Veronica Schiavon 69'		Tries: Laura Esbrí 4'; Marina Bravo 9'; Ana Mª Aigneren 25' penal try 43'; Patricia García 64'; Cons: Patricia García 9', 43'; Pens: Patricia García 16', 20', 79'

Ciudad Universitaria, Madrid
Referee: Charlon Maxime (FRA)

FB	15	Manuela Furlan
RW	14	Michela Sillari
OC	13	Maria Frazia Cioffi		(substituted off) 52'
IC	12	Paola Zangirolami
LW	11	Maria Diletta Veronese	(yellow card) 57' to 67'	(substituted off) 74'
FH	10	Veronica Schiavon
SH	9	Sara Barattin
N8	8	Flavia Severin	(yellow card) 24' to 34'
OF	7	Silvia Gaudino (c)
BF	6	Michela Este		(substituted off) 30'
RL	5	Alice Trevisan
LL	4	Cristina Molic		(substituted off) 74'
TP	3	Lucia Gai		(substituted off) 74'
HK	2	Melissa Bettoni
LP	1	Marta Ferrari
Replacements:
HK	16	Awa Coulibaly		(substituted on) 74'
PR	17	Sara Zanon
PR	18	Ilaria Arrighetti		(substituted on) 30'
LK	19	Alessia Pantarotto
FL	20	Cecilia Zublena		(substituted on) 74'
SH	21	Elisa Giordano
FH	22	Michela Tondinelli		(substituted on) 74'
CE	23	Sofia Stefan		(substituted on) 52'
Coach:
(Italy) Andrea Di Giandomenico

FB	15	Laura Esbrí	(substituted off) 73'
RW	14	Elisabeth Martínez
OC	13	Marina Bravo
IC	12	Patricia García
LW	11	Julià Plà	(substituted off) 62'
FH	10	Ana Vanessa Rial	(substituted off) 75'
SH	9	Bárbara Plà	(substituted off) 69'
N8	8	Ana Mª Aigneren (c)
OF	7	Ángela Del Pan
BF	6	Paula Medín Alevín
RL	5	María Ribera
LL	4	Lía Bailán	(substituted off) 73'
TP	3	Rocío García	(substituted off) 73'
HK	2	Aroa González	(substituted off) 75'
LP	1	Elena Redondo	(substituted off) 62'
Replacements:
HK	16	Mª Carmen Sequedo	(substituted on) 62'
PR	17	Isabel Rico	(substituted on) 73'
LK	18	Saioa Jaurena	(substituted on) 75'
FL	19	Clara Costa	(substituted on) 73'
FH	20	Irene Schiavon	(substituted on) 73'
CT	21	Lourdes Alameda	(substituted on) 69'
WG	22	Berta García	(substituted on) 62'
SH	23	Elena Roca	(substituted on) 75'
Coach:
(Spain) Inés Etxegibel

== Leading try scorers ==
Top 5 try scorers
Pos	Name	Tries	Nation
1	Megan Gaffney	5	Scotland
2	Marina Bravo	4	Spain
2	Tanya Griffith	4	Scotland
2	Julià Plà	4	Spain
5	Sara Barattin	3	Italy
5	Susie Brown	3	Scotland
5	Laura Esbrí	3	Spain
5	Manuela Furlan	3	Italy
5	Patricia García	3	Spain
5	Soteria Pulumu	3	Samoa
5	Flavia Severin	3	Italy

== Leading point scorers ==
Top 3 overall point scorers
Pos	Name	Points	Nation
1	Patricia García	50 (3T, 13C, 3P)	Spain
2	Veronica Schiavon	34 (1T, 10C, 3P)	Italy
3	Megan Gaffney	25 (5T)	Scotland

== See also ==
- Women's international rugby union

== Notes ==
Preceded by 2012 Women's European Championship	FIRA Women's European Championship; 2013	Succeeded by 2014 Women's European Trophy
