= 2009 FIRA Women's European Trophy =

2009 FIRA European Trophy
- Date: 17 May 2009– 23 May 2009
- Countries: Belgium; Germany; Italy; Netherlands; Russia; Scotland; Spain; Sweden

Tournament statistics
- Matches played: 12
- Top scorer(s): (Netherlands) Kelly van Harskamp (55 points)
- Most tries: (Netherlands) Kelly van Harskamp (11 tries)

The 2009 FIRA tournament acted as Europe's 2010 World Cup qualifying tournament. The top four nations from the 2009 Six Nations had automatically qualified, but nations finishing fifth and sixth (Scotland and Italy) joined Spain, Netherlands, Russia, Sweden, Germany, and Belgium to decide the final two places.

== Format ==
The teams were divided into two pools, the "seeding" broadly based on FIRA rankings, with the pool winners qualifying:

- Seed 1: Scotland (Pool A)
- Seed 2: Italy (Pool B)
- Seed 3: Spain (Pool B)
- Seed 4: Netherlands (Pool A)
- Seed 5: Russia (Pool A)
- Seed 6: Sweden (Pool B)
- Seed 7: Germany (Pool B)
- Seed 8: Belgium (Pool A)

After the completion of the pool phase, the tournament itself did not have a "final", nor any other classification games.

As expected, Scotland qualified from Pool A with no problems - but it always looked a tougher prospect for fellow Six Nations team Italy, in Pool B, as they would have to beat Spain - something they had never managed before. But when it came to the event neither Italy nor Spain were to qualify, but rather hosts and sixth seeds Sweden, who shocked everyone by first beating Italy and then Spain - in both cases coming from behind in the dying minutes of the game.

Other games in the tournament followed the seedings - and were embarrassingly one-sided in many cases - demonstrating the gulf that continues to exist between the leading eight or nine nations in Europe and the rest.

== Pool A ==
| Position | Nation | Games | | | | Points | | | | Table points |
| Position | Nation | Played | Won | Drawn | Lost | For | Against | Difference | Tries | Table points |
|---|---|---|---|---|---|---|---|---|---|---|
| 1 | Scotland | 3 | 3 | 0 | 0 | 193 | 18 | +175 | 30 | 9 |
| 2 | Netherlands | 3 | 2 | 0 | 1 | 152 | 38 | +114 | 24 | 7 |
| 3 | Russia | 3 | 1 | 0 | 2 | 29 | 129 | -100 | 5 | 5 |
| 4 | Belgium | 3 | 0 | 0 | 3 | 11 | 200 | -189 | 1 | 3 |

2009-05-17

| Belgium | 0-100 | Netherlands |
| | | Tries: Wikke Tuinhout 1'; Kelly van Harskamp 4', 32', 41', 43', 55', 64', 67'; Dorien Eppink 13'; Sylke Haverkorn 16'; Pien Selbeck 20'; Linda Franssen 37', 54', 76'; Elke van Meer 50'; Alexia Mavroudis 64'; Cons: Lorraine Laros 4', 16', 32', 37', 43', 55', 61', 64', 67', 76' |

Körsangens IP, Enköping, Uppsala
Referee: Barbara Guastini (Italy)

2009-05-17

| Russia | 0-84 | Scotland |
| | | Tries: Cara D'Silva 3', 55'; Donna Kennedy 9'; Laura Steven 13'; Susie Brown 19', 60'; Tanya Griffith 26'; Lucy Millard 28', 36'; Lana Blyth 31'; Suzi Newton 38'; Veronica Fitzpatrick 49'; Erin Kerr 65'; Louise Moffat 70'; Cons: Sarah Gill 9', 13', 28', 36', 38', 55'; Louise Dalgliesh 60' |

Körsangens IP, Enköping, Uppsala
Referee: Andrea Ttofa (England)

2009-05-20

| Belgium | 0-71 | Scotland |
| | | Tries: Lucy Millard 1', 13', 54', 70'; Donna Kennedy 4', 17', 24'; Veronica Fitzpatrick 11'; Cara D'Silva 29', 37'; Emma Evans 68'; Cons: Sarah Gill 1', 4', 11', 13', 54', 68'; Donna Kennedy 17', 24' |

Kristinebergs IP, Stockholm
Referee: Alain Falaise (France)

2009-05-20

| Netherlands | 34-0 | Russia |
| Tries: Marlieke Broer 16'; Kelly van Harskamp 24', 34', 58'; Wikke Tuinhout 54'; Johanna van Rossum 68'; Cons: Lorraine Laros 24', 54' |

Kristinebergs IP, Stockholm
Referee: Barbara Guastini (Italy)

2009-05-23

| Belgium | 11-29 | Russia |
| Try: Corinne Sailliez 52'; Pens: Claire Paris 21', 35' | | Tries: Elena Smirnova 10'; Natalia Alexeeva 28', 45'; Elena Gamova 37'; Olga Sychugova 63'; Cons: Anastasiya Mukharyamova 10', 28' |

Körsangens IP, Enköping, Uppsala
Referee: Paloma Loza (Spain)

2009-05-23

| Netherlands | 18-38 | Scotland |
| Tries: Kelly van Harskamp 34'; Dorien Eppink 78'; Con: Lorraine Laros 78'; Pens: Lorraine Laros 15', 31' | | Tries: Sarah-Louise Walker 25'; Susie Brown 29'; Lucy Millard 64', 67', 75'; Cons: Sarah Gill 25', 29', 64', 67', 75'; Pen: Sarah Gill 7' |

Körsangens IP, Enköping, Uppsala
Referee: Jean-Pierre Matheu (France)

== Pool B ==
| Position | Nation | Games | | | | Points | | | | Table points |
| Position | Nation | Played | Won | Drawn | Lost | For | Against | Difference | Tries | Table points |
|---|---|---|---|---|---|---|---|---|---|---|
| 1 | Sweden | 3 | 3 | 0 | 0 | 65 | 26 | +39 | 9 | 9 |
| 2 | Spain | 3 | 2 | 0 | 1 | 92 | 18 | +74 | 13 | 7 |
| 3 | Italy | 3 | 1 | 0 | 2 | 68 | 28 | +40 | 9 | 5 |
| 4 | Germany | 3 | 0 | 0 | 3 | 6 | 159 | -153 | 0 | 3 |

2009-05-17

| Germany | 0-74 | Spain |
| | | Tries: Agurtzane Obregozo 9'; Bárbara Pla 23', 61', 78'; Vanesa Rial 27', 52', 54'; Paula Medín 29'; Isabel Rodríguez 33'; Aitziber Porras 41'; Laura Lladó 64'; Cons: Laura Lladó 23', 27', 29', 41', 54', 61', 64', 78'; Pen: Laura Lladó 1' |

Kristinebergs IP, Stockholm
Referee: Aoife McCarthy (Ireland)

2009-05-17

| Sweden | 16-14 | Italy |
| Tries: Charlotta Westin Vines 20'; Jennifer Lindholm 40'; Pens: Ulrika Andersson Hall 13', 20' | | Try: Paola Zangirolami 28'; Pens: Veronica Schiavon 23', 29', 43' |

Kristinebergs IP, Stockholm
Referee: Alain Falaise (France)

2009-05-20

| Germany | 0-47 | Italy |
| | | Tries: Silvia Peron 24', 41'; Martina Barbini 29'; Paola Zangirolami 34'; Lucia Gai 48'; Maria Sanfilippo 54'; Sara Barattin 57'; Cons: Veronica Schiavon 24', 41', 57'; Pens: Veronica Schiavon 6', 19' |

Körsangens IP, Enköping, Uppsala
Referee: Paloma Loza (Spain)

2009-05-20

| Sweden | 11-6 | Spain |
| Try: Rebecka Lind 73'; Pens: Ulrika Andersson Hall 15', 52' | | Pens: Marina Bravo 40', 43' |

Körsangens IP, Enköping, Uppsala
Referee: Aofie McCarthy (Ireland)

2009-05-23

| Sweden | 38-6 | Germany |
| Tries: Charlotta Westin Vines 8', 35', 47', 80'; Jessica Berntsson 28'; Madeleine Lahti 53'; Cons: Ulrika Andersson Hall 8'; Erika Andersson 28', 80' | | Try: Marina Apfel 32'; Pen: Marina Apfel 43' |

Kristinebergs IP, Stockholm
Referee: Aoife McCarthy (Ireland)

2009-05-23

| Italy | 7-12 | Spain |
| Try: Silvia Pizzati 56'; Con: Veronica Schiavon 56' | | Tries: Isabel Rodríguez 11'; Marta Pocurull 26'; Con: Laura Lladó 26' |

Kristinebergs IP, Stockholm
Referee: Andrea Ttofa (England)

== Point Scorers ==
=== Leading point scorers ===
| Points | Name | Played | Team | Notes |
|---|---|---|---|---|
| 55 | Kelly van Harskamp | 3 | Netherlands | 11 tries |
| 45 | Lucy Millard | 3 | Scotland | 9 tries |
| 37 | Sarah Gill | 3 | Scotland | 17 cons, 1 pen |
| 32 | Lorraine Laros | 3 | Netherlands | 13 cons, 2 pens |
| 26 | Laura Lladó | 3 | Spain | 1 try, 9 cons, 1 pen |
| 25 | Charlotta Westin Vines | 3 | Sweden | 5 tries |
| 24 | Donna Kennedy | 3 | Scotland | 4 tries, 2 cons |
| 23 | Veronica Schiavon | 3 | Italy | 4 cons, 5 pens |
| 20 | Cara D’Silva | 3 | Scotland | 4 tries |
| 15 | Ana Vanesa Rial | 2 | Spain | 3 tries |
| 15 | Susie Brown | 3 | Scotland | 3 tries |
| 15 | Linda Franssen | 3 | Netherlands | 3 tries |
| 15 | Bárbara Pla | 3 | Spain | 3 tries |

=== Other point scorers ===
14 points: Ulrika Andersson Hall (Sweden)
10 points: Natalia Alexeeva (Russia), Dorien Eppink (Netherlands), Veronica Fitzpatrick (Scotland), Silvia Peron (Italy), Isabel Rodríguez (Spain), Wikke Tuinhout (Netherlands), Paola Zangirolami(Italy)
8 points: Marina Apfel (Germany)
6 points: Marina Bravo (Spain), Claire Paris (Belgium)
5 points: Sara Barattin (Italy), Martina Barbini (Italy), Jessica Berntsson (Sweden), Marlieke Broer (Netherlands), Lana Blyth (Scotland), Emma Evans (Scotland), Lucia Gai (Italy), Elena Gamova (Russia), Tanya Griffith (Scotland), Sylke Haverkorn (Netherlands), Erin Kerr (Scotland), Madeleine Lahti (Sweden), Rebecka Lind (Sweden), Jennifer Lindholm (Sweden), Alexia Mavroudis (Netherlands), Paula Medín(Spain), Elke van Meer (Netherlands), Louise Moffat (Scotland), Suzi Newton (Scotland), Agurtzane Obregozo (Spain), Silvia Pizzati (Italy), Marta Pocurull (Spain), Aitziber Porras (Spain), Johanna van Rossum (Netherlands), Corinne Sailliez (Belgium), Maria Sanfilippo (Italy), Pien Selbeck (Netherlands), Elena Smirnova (Russia), Laura Steven (Scotland), Olga Sychugova (Russia)
4 points: Erika Andersson (Sweden), Anastasiya Mukharyamova (Russia)
2 points: Louise Dalgliesh (Scotland)

== See also ==
- Women's international rugby union
