= Tracy Atiga =

New Zealand rugby player and businesswoman

Tracy Atiga (née Helleur) is the CEO of Kanaloa Rugby, a Pacific Island-owned professional rugby franchise. She is of Māori and Samoan descent and has played rugby union for Samoa.

== Early life ==
Tracy Lorraine Helleur Atiga was born in New Zealand. She was the daughter of Murray Helleur, a rugby coach, and is the sister of Jamie Helleur, who played rugby for Auckland Rugby Union in New Zealand, for the Newcastle Falcons in England, and for Samoa internationally. She attended Epsom Girls' Grammar School in Auckland and, in 1998, won a New Zealand Radio Award for her work with another girl on a feature for the Te Puutake youth radio show. She married Matt Atiga, also a rugby player and a coach.

== Career ==
As Tracy Helleur, she played rugby union for the New Zealand Māori seven-a-side team and rugby union for Manusina Samoa, the Samoa women's national rugby union team, taking part in the 2013 Women's European Qualification Tournament for the 2014 World Cup. Atiga obtained a BA from the Auckland University of Technology (2014–17) and a Master of Business Administration (MBA) from the same university between 2018 and 2020. Since 2007, she has had a wide range of roles, including with the Teachers Eastern Rugby Club; as a marketing consultant with Tonga Rugby Union at the same time as her husband was coaching in Tonga; with Auckland Council; with Auckland University; with the Samoan Sports Association and with the Waiheke Island Recreation Centre.

From 2015-19, Atiga was a trustee of the Counties Manukau Sport foundation and in 2020 a trustee of The Funding Network, which organises live crowdfunding events. At the same time, she worked with her husband in a consultancy firm that provided community development support and heritage management. Together with Motu Tony, Kevin Senio and Cynthia Ta'ala, Atiga is a founder-member of the Pacific Advisory Group, which was set up in 2017 to help bridge the gap between Pasifika and non-Pasifika players involved in rugby in Auckland. In April 2020, she became CEO of the Kanaloa Hawaii Sports Entertainment, a Pasifika-owned venture, which endeavoured to join Major League Rugby in the USA with a team based in Hawaii. The plans fell through but the company continues to seek the opportunity to place a team in other competitions.
