= Elisabeth Ygge =

- Born: February 2, 1987 (age 39)
- Height: 1.76 m (5 ft 9 1/2 in)
- Weight: 70 kg (150 lb)

Rugby union career
- Position(s): Centre, Loose forward
International career
Years	Team	Apps	(Points)
- Sweden

Elisabeth Ygge (born 2 February 1987) is a Swedish rugby union player. She plays for the Swedish women's national team and the Stockholm Exiles RFC women' team.

In 2007 Ygge was named in the Swedish squad for the 2007 FIRA Women's European Championship in Spain.

Ygge competed at the 2010 Women's Rugby World Cup in England. In 2011 she was named as captain of the Swedish women's national rugby union team. She captained the squad at the 2013 European Qualification Tournament in Spain for the 2014 World Cup.
