= Hilda Peters =

New Zealand rugby league footballer and political candidate

Personal information
- Born: 9 August 1983 (age 43) Auckland, New Zealand
- Height: 163 cm (5 ft 4 in)
- Weight: 68 kg (10 st 10 lb)

Playing information
- Position: Wing, Second-row, Hooker
Club
Years	Team	Pld	T	G	FG	P
2018–	New Zealand Warriors	9	1	0	0	4
Representative
Years	Team	Pld	T	G	FG	P
2014–19	New Zealand	8	3	0	0	12
2019	Māori All Stars	1	0	0	0	0
- Source: RLP As of 4 November 2020
- Relatives: Kahurangi Peters (sister); Rona Peters (sister)

Hilda Peters (born 9 August 1983) is a New Zealand rugby league footballer who plays for the New Zealand Warriors in the NRL Women's Premiership.

Primarily a winger, she is a New Zealand representative.

== Background ==
Born in Auckland, Peters began playing rugby league when she was 19. Her younger sisters, Rona and Kahurangi, are also New Zealand Test representatives.

Peters, who is of Māori descent, has a moko kauae (a traditional Māori face tattoo) and is fluent in te reo.

== Playing career ==
On 9 November 2014, Peters made her debut for New Zealand in their 12–8 win over Australia, playing alongside her sisters Rona and Kahurangi.

In November 2017, she was a member of New Zealand's 2017 Women's Rugby League World Cup squad. On 2 December 2017, she started at second-row in New Zealand's final loss to Australia.

On 31 July 2018, she was named in the inaugural New Zealand Warriors NRL Women's Premiership squad. In Round 1 of the 2018 NRL Women's season, she made her debut for the Warriors, starting on the wing and scoring a try in a 10–4 win over the Sydney Roosters. Her try was the first ever try scored in the NRL Women's Premiership.

On 15 February 2019, she started on the wing for the Māori All Stars in their 8–4 win over the Indigenous All Stars.

In September 2020, Hale was one of five New Zealand-based Warriors' players to travel to Australia to play in the 2020 NRL Women's premiership. Due to COVID-19 restrictions, the players had to quarantine for 14 days on entering Australia and 14 days on return to New Zealand when the season was completed.

== Political career ==
In September 2022, Hilda Peters announced that she would be standing for a position for the Manurewa Local Board in the 2022 Auckland local board elections, as part of the Manurewa Action Team ticket. Peters was unsuccessful, polling 3,425 votes and placing eighteenth in a field of twenty-nine candidates.

Peters contested the Māngere electorate during the 2023 New Zealand general election as a Te Pāti Māori candidate, and was also placed at 11 on Te Pāti Māori's party list. She came fourth place in Māngere, with 934 votes.
