= 2012 FIRA Women's European Championship =

2012 European Championship
Tournament details
- Host: Italy

Final positions
- Champions: England
- Runner-up: France

Tournament statistics
- Matches played: 6

The 2012 Women's European Championship or "European Cup" was the 17th annual rugby tournament organised by FIRA for the continent's national teams and the ninth official continental championship. Only eight teams took part - the lowest entry since 1996 and also the first time since 1996 that Scotland, Wales and Ireland did not take part. The leading four teams played in Group A in Rovereto, Italy between 13 and 19 May, and the other four played at Enköping between 3 and 7 May. The latter tournament also started Europe's Women's Rugby World Cup qualification process, with both finalists qualifying for the continent's qualification tournament in 2013.

Most of the absences were due to Unions prioritising sevens rugby, in advance of the 2013 Sevens World Cup. Even the teams attending the Group A tournament were weakened by clashes with the London, Amsterdam and Rome Sevens tournaments. England were least affected as their players only missed the first round of games, but several French players from the Six Nations did not play in this tournament, while most of the Spanish team from 2011 Women's European Trophy were selected for the Amsterdam Sevens in preference to Rovereto.

== Group A ==
Position	Nation	Games				Match points		Bonus points		Table points
Position	Nation	Played	Won	Drawn	Lost	For	Against	Tries (4+)	Losing (<=7)	Table points
1	England	3	3	0	0	122	33	3	0	15
2	France	3	2	0	1	107	51	2	1	11
3	Italy	3	1	0	2	81	57	1	1	6
4	Spain	3	0	0	3	6	175	0	0	0

2012-05-13

England	61–0	Spain

Rovereto, Italy

2012-05-13

Italy	19–22	France

Rovereto, Italy

2012-05-16

Italy	8–32	England

Rovereto, Italy

2012-05-16

France	60–3	Spain

Rovereto, Italy

2012-05-19

England	29–25	France

Rovereto, Italy

2012-05-19

Italy	54–3	Spain

Rovereto, Italy

== Group B ==
Semifinals
Sweden	67
Russia	0
Netherlands	105
Finland	0

Finals
Sweden	10
Netherlands	3
Third place
Finland	17
Russia	45

Semi finals

2012-05-03

Netherlands	105–0	Finland

Enkoping, Sweden

2012-05-03

Sweden	67–0	Russia

Enkoping, Sweden

Third-place

2012-05-07

Finland	17–45	Russia

Enkoping, Sweden

Final

2012-05-07

Sweden	10–3	Netherlands

Enkoping, Sweden

== See also ==
- Women's international rugby union
