= Sarina Clark =

New Zealand international rugby league footballer

Personal information
- Born: 11 November 1981 (age 45) Auckland, New Zealand
- Height: 153 cm (5 ft 0 in)
- Weight: 69 kg (10 st 12 lb)

Playing information
- Position: Fullback, Centre
Club
Years	Team	Pld	T	G	FG	P
2018	New Zealand Warriors	3	1	0	0	4
Representative
Years	Team	Pld	T	G	FG	P
2006–17	New Zealand
2020	Māori All Stars	1	0	0	0	0
- Source: RLP As of 11 October 2020

Sarina Clark (born Sarina Fiso; 11 November 1981) is a New Zealand rugby league footballer who played for the New Zealand Warriors in the NRL Women's Premiership.

Primarily a fullback, she is a former New Zealand representative captain.

== Playing career ==
Of Māori and Samoan descent, Clark first represented New Zealand in 2006 while playing for the Manurewa Marlins.

In 2008, she was a member of New Zealand's World Cup-winning side. In 2010, she was named the NZRL Women's Player of the Year. She won the award for a second time in 2016.

In 2013, Clark represented New Zealand at the 2013 Women's Rugby League World Cup, starting at fullback in their final loss to Australia. In 2017, Clark missed out on playing in her third World Cup due to pregnancy. On 13 September 2017, she was named the RLPA New Zealand Women's Player of the Year.

On 1 August 2018, Clark was named in the inaugural New Zealand Warriors NRL Women's Premiership squad. She played three game at centre in the 2018 NRL Women's season, scoring a try in the Warriors' 10–22 loss to the St George Illawarra Dragons.

On 21 January 2020, she was named on the wing in NRL.com's Women's Team of the Decade. On 22 February 2020, she started at halfback for the Māori All Stars in their 4–10 loss to the Indigenous All Stars.
