= Teina Clark =

Australia international rugby league footballer

Personal information
- Born: 27 October 1988 (age 37) Ngaruawahia, New Zealand
- Height: 167 cm (5 ft 6 in)
- Weight: 90 kg (14 st 2 lb)

Playing information
- Position: Five Eight, Lock, Prop
Club
Years	Team	Pld	T	G	FG	P
2018	St George Illawarra	3	0	0	0	0
Representative
Years	Team	Pld	T	G	FG	P
2006–14	New South Wales	8	3	3	0	18
2007–12	Australia	0	3	15	0	42
2011–12	Women's All Stars	2	0	0	0	0

Teina Clark (born 27 October 1988) is a New Zealand-born Australian rugby league footballer who plays for the Wentworthville Magpies in the NSWRL Women's Premiership 2019 - 2021 seasons.

She is an Australian and New South Wales representative and played for the St George Illawarra Dragons in the NRL Women's Premiership.

== Playing career ==
Born in Ngaruawahia, New Zealand, Clark played her junior rugby league for Turangawaewae before moving to Australia. Clark has represented Australian 2008 - 2011. Representing New South Wales from years 2006 - 2011, 2014. In 2013, Clark, was selected for the New Zealand Kiwi Ferns for the 2013 World Cup. To make her representative debut for New Zealand. An off field altercation involving another played. Clark received a 6 month suspension handed down by New South Wales that stopped Clark to debut for New Zealand.

In 2006, Clark made her debut for New South Wales. In 2007, she made her debut for Australia. In 2008, she represented Australia at the World Cup.

In 2013, Clark switched her international allegiance to her native New Zealand and was selected in the Kiwi Ferns squad for the 2013 Women's Rugby League World Cup. 24 hours before flying to England for the tournament, Clark was suspended by the NSWRL for six months after an incident with former professional boxer Lauryn Eagle during a club match in the Illawarra competition.

In 2014, she returned to rugby league with the Canley Heights Dragons and was selected to represent New South Wales.

In 2018, she joined the St George Illawarra Dragons for the inaugural NRL Women's Premiership season, playing three games. In May 2019, she represented NSW City at the Women's National Championships.

In 2019, she joined the Wentworthville Magpies in the NSWRL Women's Premiership.
