= Kathleen Wharton =

New Zealand rugby league footballer (1983–2024)

Personal information
- Born: 26 August 1983 Auckland, New Zealand
- Died: 21 November 2024 (aged 41)

Playing information
- Height: 171 cm (5 ft 7 in)
- Weight: 77 kg (12 st 2 lb)
- Position: Second-row, Lock
Club
Years	Team	Pld	T	G	FG	P
2019–24	New Zealand Warriors	3	0	0	0	0
Representative
Years	Team	Pld	T	G	FG	P
2008–19	New Zealand	14	1	0	0	4
2019–20	Māori All Stars	2	0	0	0	0
- Source: RLP As of 3 October 2025

Kathleen Wharton (née Keremete; 26 August 1983 – 21 November 2024) was a New Zealand rugby league footballer who played as second-row for the New Zealand Warriors in the NRL Women's Premiership.

A New Zealand international, she represented her country at the 2008 and 2013 Women's Rugby League World Cups.

== Playing career ==
In 2008, Wharton was a member of New Zealand's 2008 Women's Rugby League World Cup-winning squad. In 2013, she started at second-row in New Zealand's 2013 Women's Rugby League World Cup final loss to Australia.

Following the World Cup, Wharton retired to focus on her career and raise her family.

In 2019, Wharton returned to rugby league, representing the Māori All Stars in their 8–4 win over the Indigenous All Stars. On 22 June 2019, she represented New Zealand for the first time in six years, scoring a try in their 46–8 win over Samoa in Auckland.

On 10 July 2019, she signed with the New Zealand Warriors NRL Women's Premiership team. In Round 1 of the 2019 NRL Women's season, she made her debut for the Warriors in a 16–12 win over the Sydney Roosters.

On 22 February 2020, she started at second-row for the Maori All Stars in their 4–10 loss to the Indigenous All Stars.

== Death ==
Wharton died on 21 November 2024, at the age of 41.
