= Cynthia Ta'ala =

New Zealand and Samoan rugby league and rugby union footballer

Cynthia Ta'ala-Timaloa
Personal information
- Nationality: Samoan, New Zealander
- Born: 29 August 1974 (age 52)
- Occupations: Rugby player and coach; teacher
- Rugby league career

Playing information
Representative
Years	Team	Pld	T	G	FG	P
1999–2010	New Zealand	8	5	0	0	20

Sport

Rugby union career
- Position: Lock
International career
Years	Team	Apps	(Points)
2014	Samoa		
Coaching career
- Years: Team
- 2017-: Counties Manukau
- –: Moana Pasifika

Cynthia Ta'ala (born 29 August 1974) is a sportswoman who has played rugby league for the New Zealand women's national rugby league team and has captained the Samoa women's national rugby union team, of which she is now its assistant coach. She has also played for the New Zealand women's national basketball team.

== Sporting career ==
Cynthia Ta'ala-Timaloa was born in August 1974. She played basketball for New Zealand at the age of 16. A member of the Auckland women's rugby team, she first played for the Kiwi Ferns national rugby league team in 1999 and was still playing in 2010 at the age of 36. During that period New Zealand won three Women's Rugby League World Cups. In 2003 she was chosen as a member of the "Team of the Tournament", in the full back position.

In 2014, Ta'ala captained the Manusina Samoa women's rugby union team at the World Cup, having qualified at the 2013 European Qualification Tournament in Madrid. She finally retired as a player at the age of 43 following an injury, having previously found it difficult to hang up her boots.

== Coaching activities ==
In 2017 Ta'ala began working for Counties Manukau Rugby Football Union in southern Auckland, for which she had previously played. Her new role as a women's rugby development officer gave her the opportunity to start coaching. She is now a World Rugby accredited coach. She is the assistant coach of Manusina Samoa, most of whose members live in New Zealand and in 2021 she also helped coach a Moana Pasifika women's rugby sevens team.

== Other activities ==
Ta'ala is the sports coordinator at Marist College, Auckland, a Catholic girls high school. As a member of the Pasifika Sports Collective, she joined with other well-known sportspeople from the Pacific islands in October 2021 to encourage people from the Pacific to be vaccinated against COVID-19. Other members of the collective included former rugby union players Semo Sititi and Alama Ieremia, former rugby league player Motu Tony, and former netball player Linda Vagana. Together with Motu Tony, Kevin Senio and Tracy Atiga, Ta'ala is also a founder-member of the Pacific Advisory Group, which was set up in 2017 to help bridge the gap between Pasifika and non-Pasifika players involved in rugby in Auckland.
