= Kahurangi Peters =

New Zealand rugby league footballer

Personal information
- Born: 23 February 1994 (age 31); Auckland, New Zealand
- Height: 165 cm (5 ft 5 in)
- Weight: 92 kg (14 st 7 lb)

Playing information
- Position: Prop
Club
Years	Team	Pld	T	G	FG	P
2018	New Zealand Warriors	1	0	0	0	0
Representative
Years	Team	Pld	T	G	FG	P
2013–17	New Zealand	8	1	0	0	4
2019	Māori All Stars	1	0	0	0	0
- Source: RLP As of 10 November 2020
- Relatives: Hilda Peters (sister); Rona Peters (sister)

Kahurangi Peters (born 23 February 1994) is a New Zealand rugby league footballer who played for the New Zealand Warriors in the NRL Women's Premiership.

Primarily a prop, she represented New Zealand at the 2013 and 2017 Women's World Cup tournaments.

== Background ==
Born in Auckland, Peters is of Māori descent. Her older sisters, Hilda and Rona, are also New Zealand Test representatives.

== Playing career ==
In 2013, Peters represented New Zealand at the 2013 Women's Rugby League World Cup.

On 9 November 2014, Peters played for New Zealand in their 12–8 win over Australia, alongside her sisters Hilda and Rona.

In 2017, she represented New Zealand at the 2017 Women's Rugby League World Cup.

On 1 August 2018, Peters joined the New Zealand Warriors NRL Women's Premiership team. In Round 1 of the 2018 NRL Women's season, she made her debut for the Warriors in a 10–4 win over the Sydney Roosters.

On 15 February 2019, she started at prop for the Māori All Stars in their 8–4 win over the Indigenous All Stars.
