= Sylke Haverkorn =

Dutch rugby player (born 1988)

- Born: 6 April 1988 (age 38) Enschede, Netherlands

Rugby union career
Amateur team(s)
Years	Team	Apps	(Points)
2012–2016	RUS		
2017–2019	De Hanzeladies		
International career
Years	Team	Apps	(Points)
2012–2019	Netherlands		
Coaching career
- Years: Team
- 2016–2017: RUS
- 2017–2019: RC DIOK Leiden
- 2019: Turkey 7s
- 2019–2024: Netherlands

Sylke Haverkorn (born 6 April 1988) is a Dutch rugby union coach and former national player.

== Early life ==
Sylke Haverkorn was born in Enschede, Netherlands, on 6 April 1988.

Haverkorn started her sports career by performing judo, tennis and football. She later switched over to rugby.

== Playing career ==
=== Club ===
Between 2012 and 2016, she played for Rugbyende Utrechtse Studenten (RUS), the only all-female student rugby club in the Netherlands, and later for De Hanzeladies. She won five consecutive premier division titles with her teams.

=== International ===
She was also a permanent member of the Netherlands national rugby team.

== Coaching career ==
=== Club ===
In 2016, she took over the coaching position at RUS from Dj Verlinden, who had served ten years in the post. In the following two seasons, she became the head coach of the men's RC DIOK Leiden forwards. In 2019, her team won the national championship, becoming the first female coach to win the Ereklasse, the top flight of Dutch men's rugby union.

=== Turkey national team ===
In April 2019, she was appointed head coach of the Turkey women's national rugby sevens team, an opportunity that came after obtaining the World Rugby Level 3 coaching qualification.

=== Netherlands national team ===
In September 2019, Haverkorn was tasked with the head coach post of the Netherlands women's national team. At the same time, she became responsible for the development of the national rugby tens and rugby sevens senior women's as well as the U18 women's teams. She also coaches "Oranje Dames XV", the national women's rugby union team, which she coached in two matches of the 2020 Rugby Europe Women's Championship. and at the 2022 Rugby Europe Women's Championship.

In October 2024 the Dutch Rugby Union announced Haverkorn was stepping down as head coach, and her last match on the position was the December test match against Brazil.

== Honours ==
- 2015 Rugby Player of the Year in the Netherlands.
