= Kat Whata-Simpkins =

NZ dual code international rugby player

- Born: 4 June 1990 (age 36) Hutt Valley, New Zealand

Rugby union career
- Position: Centre
International career
Years	Team	Apps	(Points)
2011	New Zealand		
National sevens teams
Years	Team		Comps
2008–09	New Zealand Maori		
2014–	New Zealand 7s		
- Rugby league career

Playing information
Representative
Years	Team	Pld	T	G	FG	P
2008	New Zealand
2012	New Zealand Māori

Kat Whata-Simpkins (born 4 June 1990) is a New Zealand rugby union and rugby league player. She currently plays for the New Zealand Women's Sevens team.

Whata-Simpkins first represented New Zealand as a member of the Kiwi Ferns rugby league team in 2008. This was followed by stints in the New Zealand Maori Rugby Sevens team from 2008 to 2009, the Black Ferns in 2011, and the New Zealand Maori League team in 2012. She started her international sevens career in 2014.
