= Rona Peters =

New Zealand international rugby league player (born 1988)

Personal information
- Born: 21 May 1988 (age 37) Auckland, New Zealand
- Height: 156 cm (5 ft 1 in)
- Weight: 81 kg (12 st 11 lb)

Playing information
- Position: Lock, Prop, Halfback, Five-eighth
Club
Years	Team	Pld	T	G	FG	P
2018–19	Brisbane Broncos	8	3	0	0	12
2022	Gold Coast Titans	2	0	0	0	0
	Total	10	3	0	0	12
Representative
Years	Team	Pld	T	G	FG	P
2003–15	New Zealand
2016–19	Queensland	4	0	0	0	0
2019–21	Māori All Stars	2	0	0	0	0
- Source: RLP As of 4 November 2023
- Relatives: Hilda Peters (sister); Kahurangi Peters (sister)

Rona Peters (born 21 May 1988) is a New Zealand rugby league footballer who plays for the Tweed Heads Seagulls in the QRL Women's Premiership and Runaway Bay Seagulls in the SEQW Premiership.

A New Zealand and Queensland representative, Peters started her career as a half before moving into the forwards. She previously played for the Brisbane Broncos in the NRL Women's Premiership, winning two Grand Finals with the club.

== Background ==
Born in Auckland, Peters played her junior rugby league for the Papakura Sea Eagles. Her sisters, Hilda and Kahurangi, are also New Zealand Test representatives.

== Playing career ==
In 2003, Peters began playing for the Manurewa Marlins senior team as a 15-year old and was selected in the Auckland representative team. Later that year, she represented New Zealand at the 2003 Women's Rugby League World Cup.

In 2013, she represented New Zealand at the 2013 Women's Rugby League World Cup, starting at halfback in their 12–22 Final loss to Australia. On 9 November 2014, Peters played alongside her sisters, Hilda and Kahurangi, in New Zealand's 12–8 win over Australia.

In 2015, Peters moved to the Gold Coast, Queensland and joined the Burleigh Bears. On 3 May 2015, Peters played her final Test for New Zealand, starting at halfback in a 14–22 loss to Australia at Suncorp Stadium.

On 23 July 2016, she made her debut for Queensland in a 4–8 loss to New South Wales at Cbus Super Stadium. In June 2018, she represented South East Queensland at the Women's National Championships.

=== 2018 ===
On 28 June, Peters joined the Brisbane Broncos NRL Women's Premiership team. In Round 1 of the 2018 NRL Women's season, she made her debut for the Broncos in a 30–4 win over the St George Illawarra. On 30 September, she started at lock in the Broncos 34–12 Grand Final win over the Sydney Roosters.

=== 2019 ===
On 18 April, Peters was ruled ineligible from Women's State of Origin, as new rules introduced removed the residency rule, under which Peters qualified for Queensland. This was later overturned and she was given special dispensation, as she had retired from international rugby league in 2015, before she first represented Queensland.

On 6 October, she won her second NRLW Grand Final with the Broncos, starting at lock in their 30–6 win over the St George Illawarra Dragons.

=== 2020 ===
In 2020, Peters joined the Souths Logan Magpies in the QRL Women's Premiership. In October, she made herself unavailable for the 2020 NRL Women's season due to COVID-19 restrictions. On 13 November, she started at prop for Queensland in their 28–18 win over New South Wales.

=== 2021 ===
In 2021, Peters joined the Tweed Heads Seagulls. On 20 February, she represented the Māori All Stars in their 24–0 win over the Indigenous All Stars. 19 August 2021 Gold Coast Titans announce the signing of Peters for Gold Coast Titans NRLW Team.
