= 2017 Women's Rugby League World Cup squads =

This article lists the official squads for the 2017 Women's Rugby League World Cup.

== Pool A ==
=== Australia ===
Head coach: (Australia) Brad Donald

Name	Age	Club	State	Position(s)	Played	Tries	Goals	FG	Points
Kezie Apps	26	Helensburgh Tiger Lillies	NSW	Second-row	5	1	0	0	4
Chelsea Baker	31	Wallabies Gladstone	QLD	Wing	3	3	2	0	16
Heather Ballinger	35	Wests Panthers	QLD	Prop	3	0	0	0	0
Annette Brander	24	Beerwah Bulldogs	QLD	Centre	4	0	0	0	0
Brittany Breayley	26	Brothers Ipswich	QLD	Hooker	5	1	0	0	4
Ali Brigginshaw	27	Brothers Ipswich	QLD	Five-eighth	5	3	0	0	12
Karina Brown	28	Easts Tigers	QLD	Wing	4	6	0	0	24
Nakia Davis-Welsh	21	Redfern All Blacks	NSW	Fullback	4	3	0	0	12
Vanessa Foliaki	24	Easts Tigers	QLD	Second-row, Lock	3	4	0	0	16
Steph Hancock	35	Easts Tigers	QLD	Prop	4	2	0	0	8
Isabelle Kelly	21	North Newcastle	NSW	Centre	4	6	0	0	24
Renae Kunst	35	Wests Panthers	QLD	Second-row, Lock	3	0	0	0	0
Corban McGregor	23	Cronulla-Caringbah	NSW	Centre, Fullback	4	2	0	0	8
Caitlin Moran	20	North Newcastle	NSW	Halfback	4	4	14	1	45
Lavina O'Mealey	33	Redfern All Blacks	NSW	Prop	4	1	0	0	4
Talesha Quinn	28	Cronulla-Caringbah	NSW	Second-row	3	2	0	0	8
Ruan Sims	35	Cronulla-Caringbah	NSW	Prop	4	2	0	0	8
Maddie Studdon	23	Redfern All Blacks	NSW	Halfback	3	1	12	0	28
Simaima Taufa	23	Mounties	NSW	Lock	3	0	0	0	0
Zahara Temara	20	Burleigh Bears	QLD	Lock, Centre	3	3	0	0	12
Elianna Walton	32	Greenacre Tigers	NSW	Prop	4	5	0	0	20
Meg Ward	23		(Northern Territory) NT	Wing, Centre	3	3	0	0	12
Rebecca Young	35	North Newcastle	NSW	Prop	3	0	0	0	0

- Sam Bremner (Helensburgh Tiger Lillies, NSW) was selected but did not play due to injury.

=== Cook Islands ===
Head coach: (Australia) Ian Bourke

Name	Residence	Position	Played	T	G	FG	Points
Danielle Apaiana	Auckland	Second-row	3	0	0	0	0
Katelyn Arona	Christchurch	Lock, Hooker	3	1	0	0	4
Kiritapu Demant	Auckland	Five-eighth	1	0	0	0	0
Kaylen Ikitule	Auckland	Second-row	2	0	0	0	0
Chantelle Inangaro Schofield	Cook Islands	Centre	3	1	3	0	10
Urshla Kere	Brisbane	Wing	1-2	0	0	0	0
Beniamina Koiatu	Auckland	Wing	2-3	1	0	0	4
Inangaro Maraeara	Sydney	Hooker, Five-eighth	3	0	0	0	0
Toka Natua	Tokorua	Prop	3	0	0	0	0
Te Amohaere Ngata-Aerengamate	Counties-Manukau	Second-row	3	1	0	0	4
Te Kura Ngata-Aerengamate	Counties-Manukau	Lock, Prop	3	0	0	0	0
Manea Poa-Maoate	Wellington	Halfback	2	0	0	0	0
Josina Singapu	Gold Coast	interchange	1	0	0	0	0
Cecelia Strickland	Perth	Centre	2	1	0	0	4
Natalee Tagavaitau	Auckland	interchange	1-2	0	0	0	0
Samaria Taia	Sydney	interchange	1	0	0	0	0
Kiana Takairangi	Sydney	Fullback	3	0	0	0	0
Crystal George Tamarua	Auckland	Centre, Second-row	2-3	0	0	0	0
Karol-Ann Tanevesi	Sydney	Prop	1-2	0	0	0	0
Lydia Turua-Quedley	Melbourne	Five-eighth, Halfback, Wing	3	0	0	0	0
Eliza Wilson	Auckland	interchange	2	0	0	0	0
Stephanie Wilson	Sydney	interchange	1-2	0	0	0	0

- Ruahei Demant (Auckland, NZ) was selected but did not play.

=== England ===
Head coach: (England) Chris Chapman

Name	Age	Club	Position(s)	Played	Tries	Goals	FG	Points
Charlotte Booth		Bradford Bulls	Wing	3	2	0	0	8
Danielle Bound		Thatto Heath Crusaders	Hooker	4	1	0	0	4
Kayleigh Bulman		Featherstone Rovers	Wing	1	1	0	0	4
Jessica Courtman		Bradford Bulls	Centre	4	0	0	0	0
Chantelle Crowl	24	Thatto Heath Crusaders	Prop	4	0	0	0	0
Jodie Cunningham	25	Thatto Heath Crusaders	Fullback	4	0	0	0	0
Andrea Dobson		Featherstone Rovers	Lock, Prop	4	0	0	0	0
Sarah Dunn		Featherstone Rovers	Centre	3	0	0	0	0
Lois Forsell	26	Bradford Bulls	Hooker, Lock	4	0	0	0	0
Claire Garner		Bradford Bulls	Halfback	1	0	2	0	4
Faye Gaskin	25	Thatto Heath Crusaders	Five-eighth	3	0	0	0	0
Amy Hardcastle	28	Bradford Bulls	Centre	4	2	0	0	8
Katherine Hepworth		Castleford Tigers	interchange	3	0	0	0	0
Shona Hoyle	24	Bradford Bulls	Second-row	4	1	0	0	4
Kirsty Moroney		Bradford Bulls	Halfback, Five-eighth	3	0	0	0	0
Danika Priim	33	Bradford Bulls	Prop	2	0	0	0	0
Emily Rudge	26	Thatto Heath Crusaders	Second-row	4	0	0	0	0
Emma Slowe		Featherstone Rovers	Prop	4	1	0	0	4
Tara-Jane Stanley	24	Thatto Heath Crusaders	Wing	4	2	4	0	16
Beth Sutcliffe		Bradford Bulls	Second-row, Lock, Prop	4	1	0	0	4
Jenny Welsby		Thatto Heath Crusaders	Halfback	1	0	0	0	0

- Rachel Thompson (Thatto Heath - St Helens), Rhiannon Marshall (Featherstone Rovers) and Stacey White (Bradford Bulls) were selected in the squad but did not play in the tournament

== Pool B ==
=== Canada ===
Head coach: (United Kingdom) Mike Castle

Name	Age	Province	Position(s)	Played	T	G	FG	Points
Maira Acevedo	21	British Columbia	Half, Centre	3	0	0	0	0
Gillian Boag	22	British Columbia	Prop	3	0	0	0	0
Nina Bui	30	Ontario	Fullback, Hooker	3	0	0	0	0
Andrea Burk	35	British Columbia	Second Row	3	0	0	0	0
Christina Burnham	29	British Columbia	Hooker	3	0	0	0	0
Mackenzie Fane	24	Ontario	Prop	3	0	0	0	0
Kathleen Grudzinski	33	Alberta	Prop	2	0	0	0	0
Janai Haupapa	21	Alberta	Centre	2-3	0	0	0	0
Michelle Helmeczi	32	Alberta	Halfback	2	0	0	0	0
Kathleen Keller	29	Quebec	Second Row	3	0	0	0	0
Natalie King	33	British Columbia	Prop	1	0	0	0	0
Kelcey Leavitt	25	Alberta	Wing	2	0	0	0	0
Mandy Marchak	32	Manitoba	Lock	4	0	0	0	0
Sabrina McDaid	23	Ontario	Halfback	3	1	1	0	6
Wealtha-Jade Naglis	25	Alberta	Prop	3	0	0	0	0
Fedelia Omoghan	25	Ontario	Prop	1-2	0	0	0	0
Megan Pakulis	21	Ontario	Second Row	4	1	0	0	4
Irene Patrinos	24	Ontario	Fullback, Wing	4	0	2	0	4
Stevi Schnoor	22	British Columbia	Half	4	0	0	0	0
Natasha Smith	26	Ontario	Centre	3	4	0	0	16
Elizabeth Steele	24	Alberta	Prop	3	0	0	0	0
Natalie Tam	20	Ontario	Hooker	2	0	0	0	0
Tiera Thomas-Reynolds	28	Ontario	Wing	2-3	0	0	0	0
Barbara Waddell	29	New South Wales	Hooker	3	0	0	0	0

- Petra Woods (Ontario) was selected but did not play in the tournament.

=== New Zealand ===
Head coach: (New Zealand) Tony Benson

Name	Age	Club	Regional Team	Position(s)	Played	Tries	Goals	FG	Points
Racquel Anderson-Pitman	26	Manurewa Marlins Wahine	Wai-Coa-Bay Stallions	Hooker, Halfback	2	1	1	0	6
Ngatokotoru Arakua	20	Papakura Sisters	Counties Manukau	interchange	5	0	0	0	0
Shontelle Dudley	31	Richmond Roses	Akarana Falcons	Centre	4	3	0	0	12
Maitua Feterika	25	Manurewa Marlins Wahine	Counties Manukau	Centre	4	2	0	0	8
Teuila Fotu-Moala	23	Otahuhu Leopards	Counties Manukau	Second-row	4	3	0	0	12
Louisa Gago	24	Manurewa Marlins Wahine	Counties Manukau	Second-row	2	1	0	0	4
Georgia Hale (vc)	22	Richmond Roses	Akarana Falcons	Five-eighth	3	0	0	0	0
Honey Hireme	36	Papakura Sisters	Counties Manukau	Wing	4	13	0	0	52
Sharlene Johnson	40	Richmond Roses	Akarana Falcons	Second-row, Lock	2	0	0	0	0
Amber Kani	26	Manurewa Marlins Wahine	Counties Manukau	Centre	4	2	0	0	8
Bunty Kuruwaka-Crowe		Papanui Tigers	Canterbury	Prop	3	0	0	0	0
Laura Mariu (c)	36	Papakura Sisters	Counties Manukau	Lock	4	1	0	0	4
Lilieta Maumau	25	Otahuhu Leopards	Counties Manukau	Prop	5	4	0	0	16
Nita Maynard	25	Cronulla-Caringbah	New South Wales	Hooker	5	1	0	0	4
Raecene McGregor	20	Greenacre Tigers	New South Wales	Five-eighth, Fullback	3	4	0	0	16
Krystal Murray	24	Papakura Sisters	Counties Manukau	interchange	4	5	0	0	20
Kimiora Nati	29	Manurewa Marlins Wahine	Counties Manukau	Halfback	4	0	23	0	46
Apii Nicholls-Pualau	24	Manurewa Marlins Wahine	Counties Manukau	Fullback	4	1	0	0	4
Annetta-Claudia Nuuausala	22	Marist Sisters	Akarana Falcons	interchange	2	1	0	0	4
Hilda Peters	34	Papakura Sisters	Counties Manukau	Second-row, Wing	4	2	0	0	8
Kahurangi Peters	23	Papakura Sisters	Counties Manukau	Prop	1	0	0	0	0
Krystal Rota	32	Manurewa Marlins Wahine	Counties Manukau	Hooker	4	0	0	0	0
Aieshaleigh Smalley	26	Otahuhu Leopards	Counties Manukau	Prop	3	0	0	0	0
Atawhai Tupaea	28	Papakura Sisters	Counties Manukau	Wing	5	2	0	0	8

=== Papua New Guinea ===
Head coach: (Papua New Guinea) Dennis Miall

- Elvina Aaron (Southern)
- Helen Abau (Southern)
- Delilah Ahose (Southern)
- Della Audama (Southern)
- Akosita Baru (Northern)
- Christie Bulhage (Highlands)
- Brenda Goro (Southern)
- Carol Humeu (Southern)
- Shirley Joe (Northern)
- Martha Karl (Northern)
- Gloria Kaupa (Highlands)
- Naomi Kaupa (Southern)
- Amelia Kuk (Brothers Ipswich, QLD)
- Joan Kuman (Southern)
- Grace Mark (Northern)
- Mala Mark (Highlands)
- Janet Michael (Southern)
- Cathy Neap (C) (Southern)
- Anne Ouifa (Highlands)
- Vanessa Palme (Southern)
- Fay Sogave (Higlands)
- Jazmyn Taumafai (Caboolture Sharks, QLD)
- Vero Waula (Southern)
- Maima Wei (Southern)
