= 2017 Anzac Test =

Australia	New Zealand
30	12
	1	2	Total
AUS	24	6	30
NZL	0	12	12
- Date: 5 May 2017
- Stadium: Canberra Stadium
- Location: Canberra, Australian Capital Territory, Australia
- Charles Savory Medal: Matt Gillett
- Referee: (Australia) Matt Cecchin
- Attendance: 18,535

Broadcast partners
- Broadcasters: Nine Network (AUS) Sky Sport (NZ)
- Commentators: Ray Warren; Phil Gould; Peter Sterling

The 2017 Anzac Test was a rugby league test match played between Australia and New Zealand at Canberra Stadium. It was the 18th and last Anzac Test played between the two nations since the first was played under the Super League banner in 1997. The match was played on 5 May 2017.

The Australian team was announced on 26 April, while the New Zealand team was announced on 30 April with the starters and 18th man named on 4 May.

The Junior Kangaroos beat the Junior Kiwis.

== Squads ==
Australia	Position	New Zealand
Darius Boyd	Fullback	Roger Tuivasa-Sheck
Blake Ferguson	Wing	Dallin Watene-Zelezniak
Will Chambers	Centre	Jordan Kahu
Josh Dugan	Centre	Dean Whare
Valentine Holmes	Wing	Jordan Rapana
Johnathan Thurston	Five-Eighth	Kieran Foran
Cooper Cronk	Halfback	Shaun Johnson
Andrew Fifita^{2}	Prop	Jesse Bromwich (c)
Cameron Smith (c)	Hooker	Issac Luke
David Klemmer	Prop	Russell Packer
Boyd Cordner	2nd Row	Kevin Proctor
Matt Gillett	2nd Row	Simon Mannering
Trent Merrin	Lock	Jason Taumalolo
Michael Morgan	Interchange	Adam Blair
Jake Trbojevic^{1}	Interchange	Martin Taupau
Tyson Frizell	Interchange	Kenny Bromwich
Sam Thaiday	Interchange	Kodi Nikorima
Mal Meninga	Coach	David Kidwell

^{1} - Josh Papalii was originally selected to play but was withdrawn due to suspension. His original replacement, Shannon Boyd, also withdrew due to injury. He was replaced by Jake Trbojevic who was 18th Man.
^{2} - Aaron Woods was originally selected to play but withdrew due to injury. He was replaced by Andrew Fifita.

- Jordan McLean, James Maloney and Justin O'Neill were a part of the Kangaroos squad but did not play in the match.
- Elijah Taylor, David Fusitu'a and Brandon Smith were a part of the Kiwis squad but did not play in the match.

== Match summary ==
5 May 2017
8:05pm (AEST)

Australia	30 – 12	New Zealand
Tries: Dugan (12') 1 Ferguson (17') 1 Chambers (29') 1 Frizell (35') 1 Trbojevic (44') 1 Goals: Thurston 5/5 (13', 19', 30', 36', 46')		Tries: Mannering (56') 1 Tuivasa-Sheck (65') 1 Goals: Kahu 2/2 (57', 66')

Canberra Stadium, Canberra
Attendance: 18,535
Referee: (Australia) Matt Cecchin
Player of the Match: Matt Gillett

== Women's Test ==
2017 Women's Anzac Test
Australia	New Zealand
16	4
	1	2	Total
AUS	12	4	16
NZL	4	0	4
- Date: 5 May 2017
- Stadium: Canberra Stadium
- Location: Canberra, Australian Capital Territory, Australia

Broadcast partners
- Broadcasters: Nine Network (AUS) Sky Sport (NZ)
- Commentators: Mathew Thompson Darren Lockyer Jo Barrett

A Women's rugby league match between the Australian Jillaroos and New Zealand Kiwi Ferns served as the curtain-raiser for the main game.

Australia initially named a squad with 25 players on April 26. This was then finalised to 20 in preparation for the Trans-Tasman Test.

New Zealand named their 18 player squad in preparation for the Trans-Tasman Test on April 26.

=== Women's squads ===
Australia	Position	New Zealand
Isabelle Kelly	Fullback	Sarina Fiso (c)
Karina Brown	Wing	Langi Veainu
Corban McGregor	Centre	Corrina Whiley
Caitlin Moran	Centre	Va'anessa Molia-Fraser
Chelsea Baker	Wing	Atawhai Tupaea
Zahara Temara	Five-Eighth	Georgia Hale
Simone Smith	Halfback	Alex Cook
Ruan Sims (c)	Prop	Lilieta Maumau
Brittany Breayley	Hooker	Krystal Rota
Heather Ballinger	Prop	Bunty Kuruwaka-Crowe
Renae Kunst	2nd Row	Crystal Tamarua
Annette Brander	2nd Row	Teuila Fotu-Moala
Simaima Taufu-Kautai	Lock	Laura Mariu
Ali Brigginshaw	Interchange	Annetta Nuuausala
Rebecca Young	Interchange	Hilda Peters
Elliana Walton	Interchange	Ngatokotoru Arakua
Maddie Studdon	Interchange	Nora Maaka
Brad Donald	Coach	Tony Benson

=== Match summary ===
5 May 2017

Australia	16 – 4	New Zealand
Tries: Kelly (10') 1 Temara (29') 1 Kunst (51') 1 Goals: Moran 2/3 (11', 30')		Tries: Tupaea (25') 1 Goals: Laura Mariu 0/1

Canberra Stadium, Canberra

== See also ==
- Anzac Test
