= 2017 Women's Rugby League World Cup final =

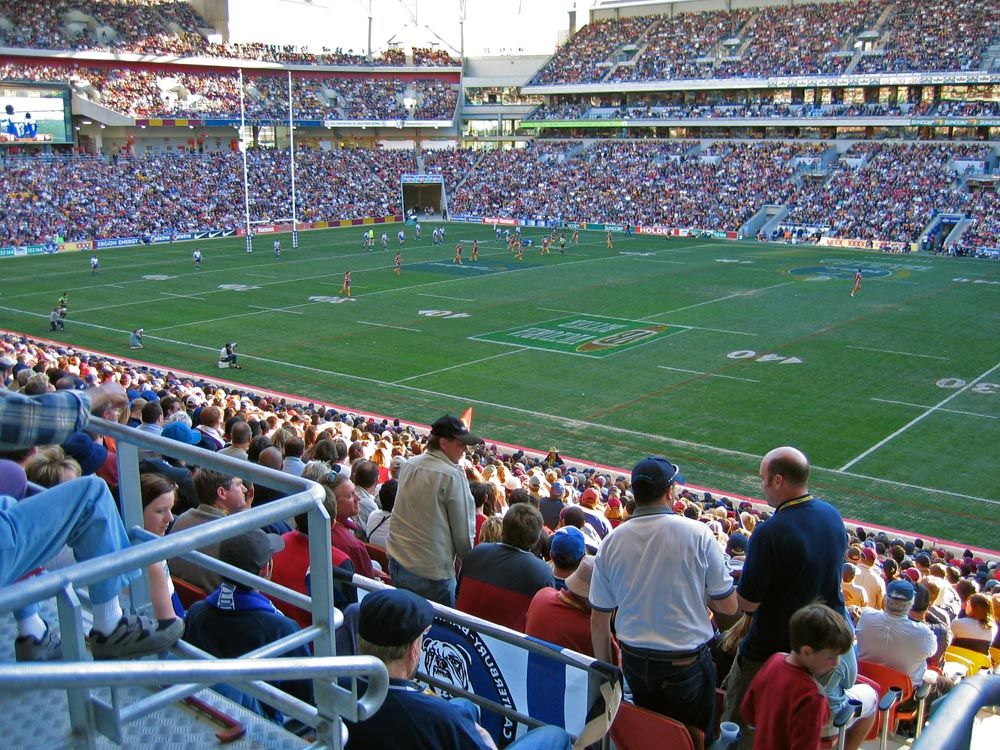
- Brisbane Stadium hosted the match
Australia	New Zealand
(ARL)	(NZRL)
23	16
	1	2	Total
AUS	12	11	23
NZL	10	6	16
- Date: 2 December 2017
- Stadium: Brisbane Stadium
- Location: Brisbane, Australia
- Woman of the Match: Ali Brigginshaw
- Referee: Adam Gee (Australia)

Broadcast partners
- Broadcasters: 7mate (Australia)
- Commentators: David Tapp (Lead caller); Andrew Ryan (Expert comments); Renee Gartner (Sideline reporter)

The 2017 Women's Rugby League World Cup final was a rugby league match which determined the winner of the 2017 Women's Rugby League World Cup. It was played between reigning champions Australia and their rivals New Zealand on 2 December 2017 at Brisbane Stadium in Brisbane, immediately before the final of the concurrent men's competition. It was the third consecutive time that the two sides played in the World Cup final.

Australia emerged victorious, winning the match 23–16 and earning their second World Cup win.

== Route to the final ==
Both teams had little difficulty reaching the final, each winning their group matches and semi-final by large margins.

Australia
Round
New Zealand
Opponent
Result
Group stage
Opponent
Result
Cook Islands
58–4
Match 1
Canada
50–4
England
38–0
Match 2
Papua New Guinea
38–0
Canada
88–0
Match 3
Cook Islands
76–0

Team	Pld	W	D	L	PF	PA	+/−	Pts
Australia	3	3	0	0	184	4	+180	6
England	3	1	0	2	52	68	-16	2
Cook Islands	3	1	0	2	26	150	-124	2

Final standing

Team	Pld	W	D	L	PF	PA	+/−	Pts
New Zealand	3	3	0	0	164	4	+160	6
Canada	3	1	0	2	26	146	-120	2
Papua New Guinea	3	0	0	3	16	96	-80	0

Opponent
Result
Knockout stage
Opponent
Result
Canada
58–6
Semi-finals
England
52–4

== Match ==
=== Summary ===
==== First half ====
- Kelly 8' Try Moran conversion
- Hireme 12' Try (Converted Nati)
- Hireme 20' Try (Conversion missed by Nati)
- Moran 35' scores for Australia on the back of her own kick-chase, and converts

==== Second half ====
- Walton scores 56'. (Moran Converts)
- Ballinger receives medical attention (59')
- McGregor scores for new Zealand (69') (Converted by Nati)

=== Details ===
2 December 2017
15:45 AEST (UTC+10)

Australia	23 – 16	New Zealand
Tries: Isabelle Kelly (8' 53') 2 Caitlin Moran (36') 1 Elianna Walton (57') 1 Goals: Caitlin Moran 3/4 (9', 37', 58'); Field Goals: Caitlin Moran (80') 1	1st: 12 – 10; 2nd: 11 – 6 Report	Tries: 2 (12' 20') Honey Hireme; 1 (69') Raecene McGregor; Goals: 2/3 Kimiora Nati (14', 70')

Brisbane Stadium, Brisbane
Referee: Adam Gee

FB	1	Nakia Davis-Welsh
WG	2	Karina Brown
CE	3	Corban McGregor
CE	4	Isabelle Kelly
WG	5	Chelsea Baker
FE	6	Ali Brigginshaw
HB	7	Caitlin Moran
PR	8	Steph Hancock
HK	9	Brittany Breayley
PR	10	Heather Ballinger
SR	11	Renae Kunst (c)
SR	12	Kezie Apps
LK	13	Simaima Taufa
Substitutes:
IC	14	Elianna Walton
IC	15	Ruan Sims
IC	16	Lavina O'Mealey
IC	17	Zahara Temara
Coach:
(Australia) Brad Donald

FB	1	Apii Nicholls-Pualau
WG	2	Atawhai Tupaea
CE	3	Maitua Feterika
CE	4	Shontelle Woodman
WG	5	Honey Hireme
FE	6	Raecene McGregor
HB	7	Kimiora Nati
PR	8	Lilieta Maumau
HK	9	Krystal Rota
PR	10	Aieshaleigh Smalley
SR	11	Teuila Fotu-Moala
SR	12	Hilda Peters
LK	13	Laura Mariu (c)
Substitutes:
IC	14	Nita Maynard
IC	15	Krystal Murray
IC	16	Ngatokortoru Arakua
IC	17	Amber Kani
Coach:
(New Zealand) Tony Benson

Touch judges:
Robert Hicks (England)
Michael Wise (Australia)
Video referee:
Shayne Hayne (Australia)

=== Statistics ===
	Australia	New Zealand
Tries	4	3
Conversions (attempts)	3 (4)	2 (3)
Penalty goals (attempts)	0 (0)	0 (0)
Field goals (attempts)	1 (1)	0 (0)
Possession
Possession	54%	46%
Total sets	42	35
Completed sets	33	27
Completion rate	79%	77%
Attacking
All runs	160	149
All run metres	1424	1262
Line breaks	4	5
Offloads	6	6
Defending
Kick metres	264	412
40/20	0	0
Tackles	274	288
Missed tackles	46	37
Goal line dropouts	0	0
Try saves	3	0
Discipline
Penalties conceded	7	11
Errors	10	10
Send offs	0	0
Sin bins	0	0
Reference: Jillaroos vs Ferns - NRL Match Centre

Australia:

- Most tries: 2 – Isabelle Kelly
- Most goals: 3 – Caitlin Moran
- Most field goals: 1 – Caitlin Moran
- Most try assists: 2 – Ali Brigginshaw
- Most runs: 15 – Corban McGregor, Simaima Taufa
- Most running metres: 154 – Kezie Apps
- Most tackles: 43 – Simaima Taufa
- Most missed tackles: 5 – Chelsea Baker, Simaima Taufa
- Most line breaks: 1 – Nakia Davis-Welsh, Caitlin Moran, Zahara Temara, Elianna Walton

New Zealand:

- Most tries: 1 – Honey Hireme, Raecene McGregor
- Most goals: 2 – Kimoira Nati
- Most field goals: 0 –
- Most try assists: 2 – Raecene McGregor
- Most runs: 15 – Laura Mariu
- Most running metres: 130 – Laura Mariu
- Most tackles: 40 – Krystal Rota
- Most missed tackles: 5 – Nita Maynard, Hilda Peters
- Most line breaks: 2 – Honey Hireme
