= 2018 NRL Grand Final =

Championship game of the National Rugby League season

- 2018 NRL Grand Final logo

| Sydney Roosters | Melbourne Storm |
|---|---|
| 21 | 6 |
| | 1 | 2 | Total |
|---|---|---|---|
| SYD | 18 | 3 | 21 |
| MEL | 0 | 6 | 6 |
- Date: 30 September 2018
- Stadium: ANZ Stadium
- Location: Sydney, New South Wales, Australia
- Clive Churchill Medal: Luke Keary
- Australian National anthem: Samantha Jade
- Referee: Gerard Sutton; Ashley Klein; Brett Suttor (Touch Judge); Nick Beashel (Touch Judge)
- Attendance: 82,688

Broadcast partners
- Broadcasters: Nine Network (Live); Fox League (Delayed)
- Commentators: Ray Warren Phil Gould Peter Sterling Andrew Johns Brad Fittler (Sideline) Darren Lockyer (Sideline)

The 2018 NRL Grand Final was the conclusive and premiership-deciding game of the 2018 National Rugby League season and was played on Sunday September 30 at Sydney's ANZ Stadium. The match was contested between minor premiers the Sydney Roosters and defending premiers the Melbourne Storm. In front of a crowd of 82,688, Sydney won the match 21-6 to claim their 14th premiership title and their first since 2013. Roosters five-eighth Luke Keary was awarded the Clive Churchill Medal as the game's official man of the match.

The match was preceded by the inaugural NRL Women's Premiership Grand Final and the 2018 NRL State Championship. Pre-match entertainment was headlined Sydney alternative rock band Gang of Youths. Australian singer Samantha Jade performed the Australian National anthem. The match was broadcast live throughout Australia by the Nine Network.

== Background ==
It was the first time the Melbourne Storm and the Sydney Roosters contested for an NRL premiership, with both teams having made the most grand final appearances since the beginning of the NRL era in 1998. Only on six occasions since 1998 has there been a grand final that did not feature either club. Both sides have also claimed every minor premiership since 2013, with the Roosters finishing first in 2013, 2014, 2015, and 2018, and the Storm doing the same in 2016 and 2017. The Roosters qualified for their first grand final since they won the premiership in 2013. The club had reached the preliminary finals in 2014, 2015, and 2017, yet were denied a grand final berth on each occasion when they were defeated by the South Sydney Rabbitohs, Brisbane Broncos and North Queensland Cowboys, respectively. The Storm qualified for their third-straight grand final, replicating the milestone they achieved in 2006, 2007 and 2008. They are the first NRL side to make three consecutive grand finals on more than one occasion. It was Trent Robinson's second grand final in his sixth year coaching the Roosters, while Craig Bellamy equalled Wayne Bennett in reaching eight grand finals as a first grade coach.

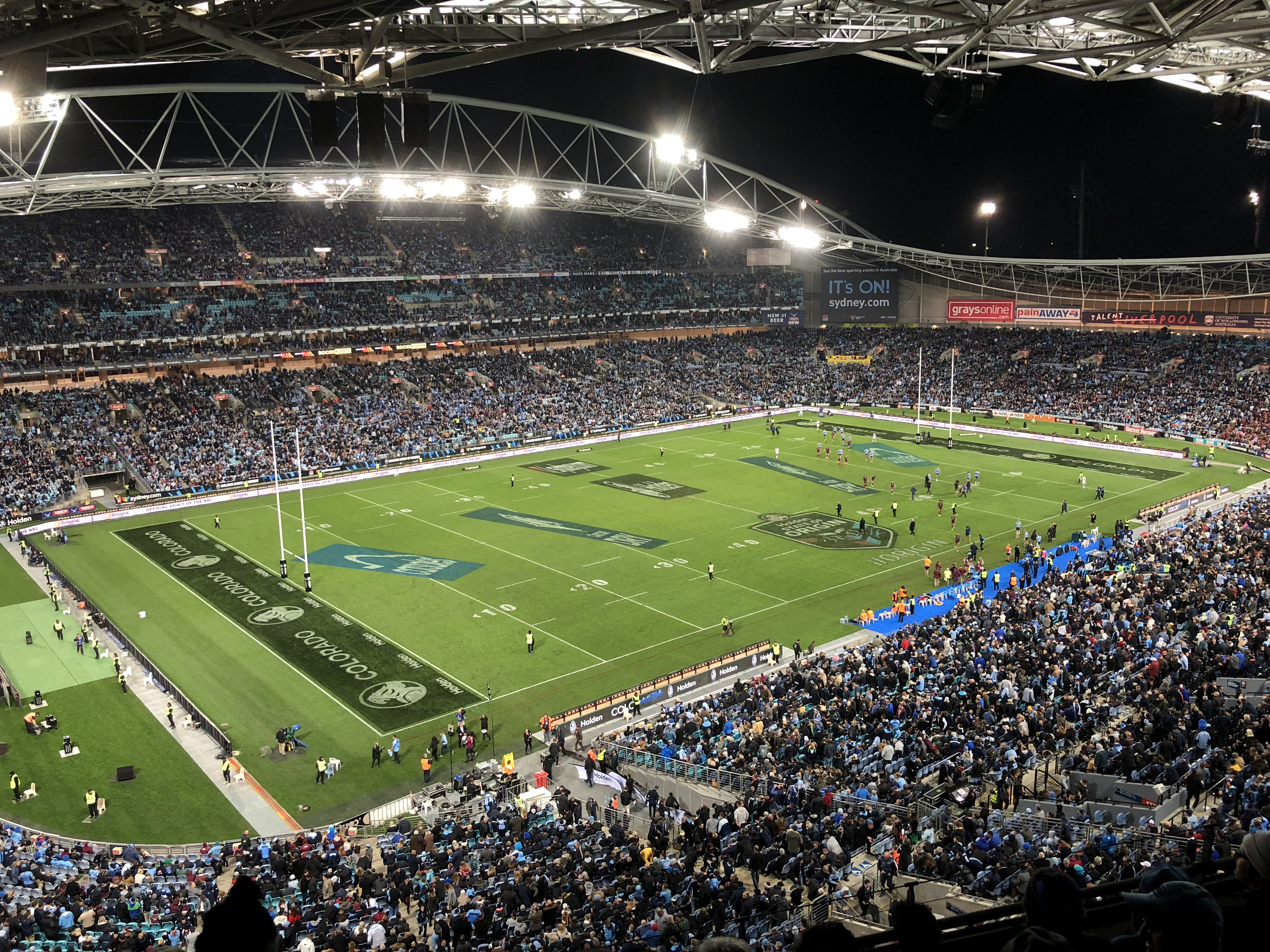
ANZ Stadium, where the match was played

Sydney and Melbourne finished first and second on the premiership ladder respectively, making up a top four in which all teams (together with the South Sydney and Cronulla-Sutherland) finished on 34 points. The sides faced each other only once during the regular season, with the Storm edging out a 9-8 victory over the Roosters at Adelaide Oval courtesy of a Cameron Smith field goal. Having a double home game advantage, both teams defeated the third-placed Rabbitohs and fourth-placed Sharks to earn a week off from the semi-finals and a place into the grand final. Sydney, playing at Allianz Stadium, defeated the Sharks 21-12 in the second qualifying final. In the preliminary final, they defeated the Rabbitohs 12-4 in front of a record crowd of 44,380 in the last ever NRL game held at Allianz Stadium before its scheduled knock-down and rebuild. Melbourne, playing at AAMI Park, narrowly defeated the Souths 29-28 in the first qualifying final, before beating their 2016 grand final opponents Cronulla-Sutherland 22-6 to join the Roosters in the premiership decider. Sydney and Melbourne last played each other in the finals in 2015, where the fourth-placed Storm defeated the minor-premiership winning Roosters 20-18 in the first week of the finals.

== Teams ==
| Sydney Roosters | Position | Melbourne Storm |
|---|---|---|
| James Tedesco | Fullback | Billy Slater |
| Daniel Tupou | Wing | Suliasi Vunivalu |
| Latrell Mitchell | Centre | Will Chambers |
| Joseph Manu | Centre | Curtis Scott |
| Blake Ferguson | Wing | Josh Addo-Carr |
| Luke Keary | Five-eighth | Cameron Munster |
| Cooper Cronk | Halfback | Brodie Croft |
| Jared Waerea-Hargreaves | Prop | Jesse Bromwich |
| Jake Friend (c) | Hooker | Cameron Smith (c) |
| Sio Siua Taukeiaho | Prop | Tim Glasby |
| Boyd Cordner (c) | 2nd Row | Felise Kaufusi |
| Mitchell Aubusson | 2nd Row | Joe Stimson |
| Victor Radley | Lock | Dale Finucane |
| Isaac Liu | Interchange | Kenny Bromwich |
| Dylan Napa | Interchange | Christian Welch |
| Zane Tetevano | Interchange | Brandon Smith |
| Ryan Matterson | Interchange | Nelson Asofa-Solomona |
| Trent Robinson | Coach | Craig Bellamy |

The grand final would be Billy Slater's final game before his retirement after playing 319 first grade games in the NRL, becoming the 16th player to finish their career playing over 300 games at one club. However, many felt Slater was extremely lucky to be playing in the game after being charged for a shoulder charge against Cronulla player Sosaia Feki in the preliminary final the week before. The judiciary cleared Slater of any wrongdoing, presenting him with the opportunity to win a grand final in the final game of his illustrious career. Melbourne captain Cameron Smith surpassed Darren Lockyer in becoming the most capped finals player in the NRL, with 36 appearances. Brodie Croft, Joe Stimson, Christian Welch, and Brandon Smith were the only new additions to the Storm's grand final winning squad from the previous year. Roosters halfback Cooper Cronk played in his eighth grand final, after playing all seven previous grand finals for the Storm; he equalled Steve Menzies in becoming the fourth most-capped NRL player in history; he also became the first player to win back-to-back premierships with different clubs since Johnny Mayes accomplished the feat in 1973 with Manly-Warringah then 1974 with Eastern Suburbs. Daniel Tupou, Jared Waerea-Hargreaves, Jake Friend, Boyd Cordner, and Mitchell Aubusson were the last remaining members from their 2013 premiership winning squad, while Frank-Paul Nu'uausala wasn't selected to play. Luke Keary was the only other Roosters player to have experienced premiership success, having played for the South Sydney Rabbitohs in their victorious 2014 Grand Final.

=== Officials ===
| Position | | | Stand-By |
|---|---|---|---|
| Referees: | Gerard Sutton | Ashley Klein | Ben Cummins |
| Touch Judges: | Nick Beashel | Brett Suttor | Chris Sutton |
| Bunker: | Steve Chiddy | Ben Galea | |

== Match summary ==
Sunday, 30 September
7:35pm (AEST)

| Sydney Roosters | 21 – 6 | Melbourne Storm |
|---|---|---|
| Tries: Tupou (8') 1 Mitchell (15') 1 Manu (37') 1 Goals: Mitchell 4/6 (4' pen, 16', 31' pen, 79' pen); Field Goals: Keary (69') 1 | 1st: 18 – 0; 2nd: 3 – 6 | Tries: 1 (63') Addo-Carr; Goals: 1/1 (64') C Smith; Sin Bin: (30', 78') Munster |

ANZ Stadium, Sydney
Attendance: 82,688
Referee: Gerard Sutton, Ashley Klein
Clive Churchill Medal: Luke Keary

== Opening games ==
=== NRL Women's Premiership Grand Final ===
Sunday, 30 September
1:35pm (AEST)

| Brisbane Broncos Women's | 34 – 12 | Sydney Roosters Women's |
|---|---|---|
| Tries: Kimiora Nati (6', 18' pen, 46') 3 Heather Ballinger (14') 1 Ngatokotoru Arakua (25') 1 Lavinia Gould (29') 1 Goals: Chelsea Baker 5/6 (7', 16', 19', 26', 48') | 1st: 28 – 6; 2nd: 6 – 6 | Tries: 1 (11') Tazmin Grey; 1 (44') Lavina O'Mealey; Goals: 2/3 Zahara Temara (5' pen, 45') |

ANZ Stadium, Sydney
Referee: Jon Stone, Kasey Badger
Karyn Murphy Medal: Kimiora Nati

Team lists:

| FB | 1 | Chelsea Baker |
| WG | 2 | Julia Robinson |
| CE | 3 | Meg Ward |
| CE | 4 | Amber Pilley |
| WG | 5 | Amelia Kuk |
| FE | 6 | Kimiora Nati |
| HB | 7 | Ali Brigginshaw (c) |
| PR | 8 | Heather Ballinger |
| HK | 9 | Brittany Breayley |
| PR | 15 | Chelsea Lenarduzzi |
| SR | 11 | Teuila Fotu-Moala |
| SR | 12 | Maitua Feterika |
| LK | 13 | Rona Peters |
Substitutes:
| IC | 10 | Steph Hancock |
| IC | 14 | Lavinia Gould |
| IC | 16 | Mariah Storch |
| IC | 17 | Ngatokotoru Arakua |
Coach:
Paul Dyer

| FB | 1 | Karina Brown |
| WG | 2 | Brydie Parker |
| CE | 3 | Shontelle Stowers |
| CE | 4 | Isabelle Kelly |
| WG | 5 | Taleena Simon |
| FE | 6 | Lavina O'Mealey |
| HB | 7 | Zahara Temara |
| PR | 8 | Ruan Sims (c) |
| HK | 9 | Nita Maynard |
| PR | 10 | Elianna Walton |
| SR | 11 | Tazmin Grey |
| SR | 12 | Vanessa Foliaki |
| LK | 13 | Simaima Taufa (c) |
Substitutes:
| IC | 14 | Kylie Hilder |
| IC | 15 | Sarah Togatuki |
| IC | 16 | Victoria Latu |
| IC | 17 | Kandy Kennedy |
Coach:
Adam Hartigan

=== NRL State Championship ===
Sunday, 30 September
3:40pm (AEST)

| Canterbury-Bankstown Bulldogs | 42 – 18 | Redcliffe Dolphins |
|---|---|---|
| Tries: Josh Cleeland (36', 38') 2 Rhyse Martin (6') 1 Chris Smith (47') 1 Renouf To'omaga (52') 1 Jayden Okunbor (72') 1 Fa'amanu Brown (77') 1 Goals: Rhyse Martin 5/6 (8', 37', 48', 54', 58' pen); Greg Eastwood 1/1 (74'); Josh Cleeland 1/1 (78') | 1st: 16 – 6; 2nd: 26 – 12 | Tries: 2 (30', 60') Kotoni Staggs; 1 (74') James Taylor; Goals: 2/2 Bryce Donovan (61', 75'); 1/1 Kotoni Staggs (31') |

ANZ Stadium, Sydney
Referee: Adam Cassidy, Liam Kennedy

Team lists:

| FB | 1 | Mason Cerruto |
| WG | 2 | Josh Bergamin |
| CE | 3 | Morgan Harper |
| CE | 4 | John Olive |
| WG | 5 | Jayden Okunbor |
| FE | 6 | Josh Cleeland |
| HB | 7 | Fa'amanu Brown |
| PR | 8 | Renouf To'omaga |
| HK | 9 | Zac Woolford |
| PR | 10 | Francis Tualau |
| SR | 11 | Ofahiki Ogden |
| SR | 12 | Rhyse Martin (c) |
| LK | 13 | Greg Eastwood |
Substitutes:
| IC | 14 | Bronson Garlick |
| IC | 14 | Lachlan Burr |
| IC | 16 | Jack Nelson |
| IC | 17 | Chris Smith |
Coach:
Steve Georgallis

| FB | 1 | Trai Fuller |
| WG | 2 | Josh Beehag |
| CE | 3 | Kotoni Staggs |
| CE | 4 | Tom Opacic |
| WG | 5 | Jeremy Hawkins |
| FE | 6 | Bryce Donovan |
| HB | 7 | Cameron Cullen (c) |
| PR | 16 | Nathan Watts |
| HK | 9 | Jake Turpin |
| PR | 10 | Sam Anderson |
| SR | 14 | Miles Taueli |
| SR | 11 | Toby Rudolf |
| LK | 13 | Jamil Hopoate |
Substitutes:
| IC | 8 | Nick Slyney |
| IC | 12 | Aaron Whitchurch |
| IC | 15 | James Taylor |
| IC | 17 | Hugh Pratt |
Coach:
Adam Mogg

== Aftermath ==
As premiership winners, the Sydney Roosters qualified to play in the 2019 World Club Challenge. Against the Super League XXIII champions the Wigan Warriors, the Roosters won the match 20-8 at Wigan's DW Stadium.

== See also ==
- NRL Premiership winners
- 2018 NRL Finals Series
