= 2019 Rugby League World Cup 9s =

2019 World Cup 9s
- Number of teams: 12 (men), 4 (women)
- Host country: Australia
- Winner: Australia (1st title)
- Matches played: 28
- Points scored: 973 (34.75 per match)
- Tries scored: 184 (6.57 per match)
- Top scorer: (New Zealand) Jamayne Isaako (52 - men) (Australia) Tiana Penitani (20 - women)
- Top try scorer: (New Zealand) Jamayne Isaako (7 - men) (Australia) Tiana Penitani (5 - women)

The 2019 Rugby League World Cup 9s was the first staging of the Rugby League World Cup 9s tournament and took place on 18 and 19 October 2019 at Sydney's Bankwest Stadium. The tournament featured teams from 12 International Rugby League member countries, 4 of which also fielded teams in the women's tournament. In the men's final, Australia defeated New Zealand, while in the women's final, New Zealand defeated Australia.

== Rule variations ==
The standard rules of rugby league applied but with the following variations:

- games are nine-a-side with unlimited interchanges in the 13-strong squad
- each half is nine minutes with a 2-minute half time
- the tackle count for the team in possession is five rather than six
- any player sin-binned is off the field for only three minutes
- the 40/20 rule is supplemented by a 20/40 rule i.e. a kick from behind the player's own 20m line which after bouncing goes into touch past the opponent's 40m line will result in the kicking team retaining possession with a tap-restart
- Bonus zone tries - tries score four points as normal but the value of the try will be increased to five for a try scored in the area between the goalposts
- all conversions are drop kicks rather than place kicks and a 25-second shot clock will apply
- a game which goes to extra time will be decided by golden try extra time

== Teams ==
The competing teams were hand picked, and the selections were announced on 22 April 2019.

On 27 September 2019, the Tonga National Rugby League were suspended by the International Rugby League (IRL), pending an investigation into their board. Tonga were represented at the tournament by a "Tonga Invitatonal" team.

=== Men's ===
Team	Captain	Coach	IRL rank
Australia	Daly Cherry-Evans & Wade Graham	(Australia) Mal Meninga	1
Cook Islands	Alex Glenn	(New Zealand) (Cook Islands) Tony Iro	28
England	James Graham	(Australia) Wayne Bennett	2
Fiji	Kevin Naiqama	(Australia) Brandon Costin	5
France	Jason Baitieri	(France) Aurélien Cologni	6
Lebanon	Reece Robinson	(Australia) Rick Stone	9
New Zealand	Shaun Johnson	(Australia) Michael Maguire	3
Papua New Guinea	Rhyse Martin	(Papua New Guinea) Michael Marum	10
Samoa	Joseph Leilua	(Australia) Matt Parish	7
Tonga Invitational	Jason Taumalolo	(Australia) (Tonga) David Tangata-Toa	4
United States	Mark Offerdahl	(Australia) Sean Rutgerson	15
Wales	Elliot Kear	(England) John Kear	11

=== Women's ===
Team	Captain	Coach	IRL rank
Australia	Ali Brigginshaw	(Australia) Brad Donald	1
England	Emily Rudge	(England) Craig Richards	3
New Zealand	Honey Hireme	(Australia) Justin Morgan	2
Papua New Guinea	Janet Johns	(Papua New Guinea) Bagelo Solien	6

== Match Officials ==
The NRL named the following 18 NRL match officials to handle the 28 matches.

- (Australia) Grant Atkins
- (Australia) Tyson Brough
- (Australia) Matt Cecchin
- (Australia) Ben Cummins
- (Australia) Darian Furner
- (Australia) Adam Gee
- (Australia) Peter Gough
- (Australia) Phil Henderson
- (Australia) Ziggy Przeklasa-Adamski
- (Australia) Belinda Sharpe
- (Australia) Todd Smith
- (Australia) Jon Stone
- (Australia) Chris Sutton
- (Australia) Gerard Sutton
- (England) Chris Kendall
- (France) Stephane Vincent
- (New Zealand) Henry Perenara
- (New Zealand) Paki Parkinson

== Venue ==
Sydney	2019 Rugby League World Cup 9s is located in Australia
Bankwest Stadium	2019 Rugby League World Cup 9s is located in Australia
Capacity: 30,000	2019 Rugby League World Cup 9s is located in Australia

== Men's tournament ==
=== Pool stage ===
The pools were announced on 22 July 2019. The draw was announced on 4 August 2019.

Pool A	Pool B	Pool C
Australia; New Zealand; Papua New Guinea; United States	England; France; Lebanon; Wales	Tonga Invitational; Cook Islands; Fiji; Western Samoa

==== Pool A ====
Pos	Team	Pld	W	D	L	PF	PA	PD	Pts	Qualification
1	Australia	3	3	0	0	92	23	+69	6	Advance to knockout stages
2	New Zealand	3	2	0	1	76	42	+34	4	Advance to knockout stages
3	Papua New Guinea	3	1	0	2	44	54	−10	2	
4	United States	3	0	0	3	21	114	−93	0	

Updated to match(es) played on 19 October 2019. Source:

18 October 2019	Australia	25 – 12	New Zealand
18 October 2019	Papua New Guinea	27 – 10	United States
19 October 2019	New Zealand	18 – 17	Papua New Guinea
19 October 2019	Australia	41 – 11	United States
19 October 2019	New Zealand	46 – 0	United States
19 October 2019	Australia	26 – 0	Papua New Guinea

==== Pool B ====
Pos	Team	Pld	W	D	L	PF	PA	PD	Pts	Qualification
1	England	3	2	0	1	76	24	+52	4	Advance to knockout stages
2	Lebanon	3	2	0	1	42	46	−4	2 (Note: Lebanon were stripped of their win over France due to fielding an ineligible player.)	
3	France	3	1	0	2	35	56	−21	2	
4	Wales	3	1	0	2	35	62	−27	2	

Updated to match(es) played on 19 October 2019. Source:
Notes:

18 October 2019	France	8 – 12	Lebanon
18 October 2019	England	25 – 4	Wales
19 October 2019	France	23 – 6	Wales
19 October 2019	England	13 – 16	Lebanon
19 October 2019	Lebanon	14 – 25	Wales
19 October 2019	England	38 – 4	France

==== Pool C ====
Pos	Team	Pld	W	D	L	PF	PA	PD	Pts	Qualification
1	Samoa	3	3	0	0	73	41	+32	6	Advance to knockout stages
2	Cook Islands	3	2	0	1	46	34	+12	4	
3	Tonga Invitational	3	1	0	2	48	71	−23	2	
4	Fiji	3	0	0	3	44	65	−21	0	

Updated to match(es) played on 19 October 2019. Source:

18 October 2019	Tonga Invitational	7 – 30	Cook Islands
18 October 2019	Samoa	32 – 17	Fiji
19 October 2019	Samoa	17 – 4	Cook Islands
19 October 2019	Tonga Invitational	21 – 17	Fiji
19 October 2019	Fiji	10 – 12	Cook Islands
19 October 2019	Tonga Invitational	20 – 24	Samoa

=== Knockout stage ===
Semi-finals
A1	Australia	25
C1	Samoa	8
A2	New Zealand	22
B1	England	6

Final
Australia	24
New Zealand	10

==== Semi-finals ====
===== New Zealand vs England =====
19 October 2019
18:55 AEST (UTC+10)

New Zealand	22 – 6	England
Tries: Isaako (5', 14') 2 Maumalo (2') 1 Smith (10') 1 Goals: Isaako 3/4 (2', 10', 14)	1st: 10 – 0; 2nd: 12 – 6	Tries: 1 (12') McGillvary; Goals: 1/1 Austin (12')

Bankwest Stadium, Sydney
Referee: Ben Cummins (Australia)

===== Australia vs Samoa =====
19 October 2019
19:20 AEST (UTC+10)

Australia	25 – 8	Samoa
Tries: Ponga (1') 1 Addo-Carr (7') 1 Brimson (14') 1 Frizell (16') 1 Goals: Moses 2/2 (15', 17'); Cherry-Evans 1/2 (1')	1st: 11 – 4; 2nd: 14 – 4	Tries: 2 (5', 11') Seve; Goals: 0/2 Lafai

Bankwest Stadium, Sydney
Referee: Chris Kendall (England)

==== Final: Australia v New Zealand ====
19 October 2019
21:00 AEST (UTC+10)

Australia	24 – 10	New Zealand
Tries: Moses (5', 7', 17') 3 Feldt (14') 1 Goals: Moses 3/4 (5', 7', 17')	1st: 13 – 10; 2nd: 11 – 0	Tries: 1 (2') Smith; 1 (6') Isaako; Goals: 1/2 Isaako (6')

Bankwest Stadium, Sydney
Referee: Chris Kendall (England)

== Women's tournament ==
=== Pool stage ===
The draw was announced on 4 August 2019.

Pool A
Australia
England
New Zealand
Papua New Guinea

Pos	Team	Pld	W	D	L	PF	PA	PD	Pts	Qualification
1	Australia	3	3	0	0	94	18	+76	6	Advance to Final
2	New Zealand	3	2	0	1	65	38	+27	4	Advance to Final
3	England	3	1	0	2	33	79	−46	2	
4	Papua New Guinea	3	0	0	3	22	79	−57	0	

Updated to match(es) played on 18 October 2019. Source:

18 October 2019	England	25 – 4	Papua New Guinea
18 October 2019	Australia	22 – 8	New Zealand
19 October 2019	New Zealand	24 – 12	Papua New Guinea
19 October 2019	Australia	42 – 4	England
19 October 2019	Australia	30 – 6	Papua New Guinea
19 October 2019	New Zealand	33 – 4	England

=== Final: Australia v New Zealand ===
19 October 2019
19:45 AEST (UTC+10)

Australia	15 – 17	New Zealand
Tries: Penitani (1') 1 Apps (5') 1 McGregor (11') 1 Goals: Dibb 1/2 (11'); Tungai 0/1	1st: 8 – 7; 2nd: 7 – 10	Tries: 1 (3') McGregor; 1 (10') Newman; 1 (13') Maynard; Goals: 2/2 McGregor (3', 13'); 0/1 Nicholls-Pualau

Bankwest Stadium, Sydney
Referee: Henry Perenara (New Zealand)

== Try scorers ==
=== Men's ===
7

- (New Zealand) Jamayne Isaako

5

- (New Zealand) Ken Maumalo

4

- (Australia) Josh Addo-Carr
- (Australia) Kyle Feldt
- (Australia) Mitchell Moses

3

- (Tonga) Robert Jennings
- (Tonga) Sione Katoa
- (Lebanon) Bilal Maarbani
- (Samoa) Marion Seve
- (New Zealand) Reimis Smith
- (Fiji) Maika Tudravu

2

- (Samoa) Dean Blore
- (Australia) AJ Brimson
- (Australia) Nathan Brown
- (Wales) Mike Butt
- (England) Jake Connor
- (Australia) David Fifita
- (Papua New Guinea) Edene Gebbie
- (Cook Islands) Anthony Gelling
- (Australia) Campbell Graham
- (England) Ash Handley
- (Cook Islands) Kayal Iro
- (New Zealand) Shaun Johnson
- (Wales) Elliot Kear
- (Samoa) Moses Leota
- (Samoa) Danny Levi
- (France) Gavin Marguerite
- (England) Jermaine McGillvary
- (Lebanon) Travis Robinson
- (New Zealand) Bailey Simonsson
- (England) Sam Tomkins
- (Samoa) Brian To'o

1

- (Papua New Guinea) Stargroth Amean
- (Cook Islands) Tevin Arona
- (Australia) Jai Arrow
- (England) Blake Austin
- (France) Lambert Belmas
- (Papua New Guinea) Watson Boas
- (United States) Ryan Burroughs
- (Australia) Daly Cherry-Evans
- (England) Daryl Clark
- (France) Alrix Da Costa
- (Tonga) William Fakatoumafi
- (United States) Bureta Faraimo
- (United States) Kristian Freed
- (Australia) Tyson Frizell
- (Wales) Regan Grace
- (Australia) Clinton Gutherson
- (England) Ryan Hall
- (Samoa) Tim Lafai
- (France) Thomas Lasvenes
- (Fiji) Joseva Lawalawa
- (Papua New Guinea) Kyle Laybutt
- (Fiji) Penaia Leveleve
- (Papua New Guinea) Garry Lo
- (Samoa) Jarome Luai
- (France) Paul Marcon
- (New Zealand) Jeremy Marshall-King
- (Cook Islands) Steven Marsters
- (Fiji) Kevin Naiqama
- (Tonga) Tesi Niu
- (Samoa) David Nofoaluma
- (Papua New Guinea) Justin Olam
- (Tonga) Tevita Pangai Junior
- (Australia) Ryan Papenhuyzen
- (Australia) Kalyn Ponga
- (Cook Islands) John Puna
- (Papua New Guinea) Nixon Putt
- (Fiji) Selestino Ravutaumada
- (Cook Islands) Reubenn Rennie
- (Lebanon) Reece Robinson
- (France) Arthur Romano
- (Papua New Guinea) Dan Russell
- (Samoa) Ligi Sao
- (Fiji) Maika Sivo
- (England) Ryan Sutton
- (Cook Islands) Brody Tamarua
- (Lebanon) Charbel Tasipale
- (Cook Islands) Aaron Teroi
- (United States) Junior Vaivai
- (Tonga) Malakai Watene-Zelezniak
- (Wales) Lloyd White
- (England) Elliott Whitehead
- (England) Gareth Widdop

=== Women's ===
5

- (Australia) Tiana Penitani

4

- (New Zealand) Honey Hireme
- (Australia) Corban McGregor

3

- (New Zealand) Jules Newman

2

- (Australia) Ali Brigginshaw
- (Australia) Isabelle Kelly
- (England) Rhiannon Marshall
- (New Zealand) Nita Maynard
- (New Zealand) Raecene McGregor
- (Papua New Guinea) Ua Ravu
- (New Zealand) Krystal Rota
- (New Zealand) Kiana Takairangi
- (Australia) Shakiah Tungai

1

- (Papua New Guinea) Elsie Albert
- (Australia) Kezie Apps
- (England) Caitlin Beevers
- (England) Leah Burke
- (Australia) Keeley Davis
- (England) Amy Hardcastle
- (Papua New Guinea) Janet Johns
- (New Zealand) Kanyon Paul
- (Australia) Julia Robinson
- (England) Emily Rudge
- (Australia) Jessica Sergis
- (Australia) Hannah Southwell
- (New Zealand) Atawhai Tupaea
- (England) Georgia Wilson

== Controversy ==
On 19 October 2019, Lebanon's Jacob Kiraz and Jordan Samrani and Papua New Guinea women's players Sera Koroi and Joyce Waula were all suspended from the tournament for being under the age of 18.

While the International Rugby League allows players 16 or older to play in Test matches, the National Rugby League (who ran the tournament) rules require that players must be 18 or older.

Kiraz, who would not turn 18 until November 2019, was the only one of the four to play a game, coming off the bench in Lebanon's 12–8 win over France. Lebanon were stripped of the two competition points earned for their win as a result.

== Media coverage ==
Country or region	Broadcaster	Broadcasting
Australia	Fox Sports	All 28 matches live (via Fox League or streamed on Kayo Sports)
Australia	NRL Live Pass	All 28 matches live streamed
Brazil	Watch NRL	All 28 matches live streamed
Canada	Watch NRL	All 28 matches live streamed
China	Watch NRL	All 28 matches live streamed
Cook Islands	Digicel	All 28 matches live
Cook Islands	OVOPlay	All 28 matches live streamed
Germany	Watch NRL	All 28 matches live streamed
Fiji	Digicel	All 28 matches live
Fiji	Fiji FBC	All 28 matches live streamed
Fiji	OVOPlay	All 28 matches live streamed
France	OVOPlay	All 28 matches live streamed
France	Watch NRL	All 28 matches live streamed
(Republic of Ireland) Ireland	Sky Sports	All 28 matches live
(Republic of Ireland) Ireland	Watch NRL	All 28 matches live streamed
Japan	Watch NRL	All 28 matches live streamed
Lebanon	OVOPlay	All 28 matches live streamed
Lebanon	Watch NRL	All 28 matches live streamed
New Zealand	Sky (New Zealand)	All 28 matches live
Papua New Guinea	Digicel	All 28 matches live
Papua New Guinea	OVOPlay	All 28 matches live streamed
Samoa	Digicel	All 28 matches live
Samoa	OVOPlay	All 28 matches live streamed
South Africa	Watch NRL	All 28 matches live streamed
Tonga	Digicel	All 28 matches live
Tonga	OVOPlay	All 28 matches live streamed
United Kingdom	Sky Sports	All 28 matches live
United Kingdom	Watch NRL	All 28 matches live streamed
United States	OVOPlay	All 28 matches live streamed
United States	Watch NRL	All 28 matches live streamed
