= Jules Newman =

New Zealand international rugby league footballer

Personal information
- Born: 23 February 1989 (age 37) Mosgiel, New Zealand
- Height: 167 cm (5 ft 6 in)
- Weight: 69 kg (10 st 12 lb)

Playing information
- Position: Centre
Club
Years	Team	Pld	T	G	FG	P
2019	New Zealand Warriors	3	0	0	0	0
Representative
Years	Team	Pld	T	G	FG	P
2019	New Zealand 9s	4	3	0	0	12
2019	New Zealand	1	0	0	0	0
- Source: RLP As of 9 November 2020

Jules Newman (born 23 February 1989) is a New Zealand rugby league footballer who played for the New Zealand Warriors in the NRL Women's Premiership.

Primarily a centre, she is a New Zealand and New Zealand 9s representative.

== Background ==
Born in Mosgiel, Newman was a long time North Harbour representative in rugby union, winning the Farah Palmer Cup Player of the Year in 2018.

== Playing career ==
In 2019, Newman switched to rugby league and began playing for the Mount Albert Lions in the Auckland Rugby League.

In June 2019, she was named in the New Zealand squad for their mid-season Test against Samoa but did not play. On 10 July 2019, she signed with the New Zealand Warriors NRL Women's Premiership team. In Round 1 of the 2019 NRL Women's season, she made her debut for the Warriors in a 16–12 win over the Sydney Roosters.

In October 2019, she was a member of New Zealand's 2019 Rugby League World Cup 9s-winning squad. On 25 October 2019, she made her Test debut for New Zealand, starting at centre in a 8–28 loss to Australia.
