= Sharnita Woodman =

NZ dual-code international rugby player

Personal information
- Born: 2 September 1986 (age 40) New Plymouth, New Zealand
- Height: 1.58 m (5 ft 2 in)
- Weight: 70 kg (11 st 0 lb)

Playing information
- Position: Hooker
Club
Years	Team	Pld	T	G	FG	P
2008	Auckland Vulcans
Representative
Years	Team	Pld	T	G	FG	P
	New Zealand					0

Rugby union career
- Position: Loose Forward
Amateur team(s)
Years	Team	Apps	(Points)
	Manurewa		(0)
Provincial / State sides
Years	Team	Apps	(Points)
2013–2016	Counties Manukau	26	(40)
International career
Years	Team	Apps	(Points)
2016	New Zealand	2	(0)
- Relatives: Shontelle Woodman (sister)

Sharnita Woodman (born 2 September 1986) is a New Zealand dual international player. She played rugby union internationally for the Black Ferns and has also represented New Zealand in rugby league. She played union provincially for Counties Manukau in the Farah Palmer Cup.

== Rugby career ==
=== Rugby union ===
In 2016, She was part of the Black Ferns squad that played Australia in October, but did not feature in any games. Woodman was named in the Black Ferns squad for their UK and Ireland tour in a three-Test series against England, Ireland and Canada. She made her international debut against Canada on 23 November 2016 at Donnybrook Stadium in Dublin.

=== Rugby league ===
In 2008, she played for the Auckland Vulcans in the NZRL Women's National Tournament.

Woodman played alongside her twin sister, Shontelle, in the Kiwi Ferns. She scored a try in her sides loss to Australia in the final of the 2013 Rugby League World Cup in England. Woodman competed for New Zealand and scored a try against Australia in the first match of the 2015 NRL Auckland Nines. In May 2015, she scored a consolation try for the Kiwi Ferns on full-time in their 14–22 loss to the Jillaroos.
