= 2017 Women's Rugby League World Cup =

Fifth staging of the Women's Rugby League World Cup

- Number of teams: 6
- Host country: Australia
- Winner: Australia (2nd title)
- Runner-up: New Zealand
- Matches played: 12
- Points scored: 588 (49 per match)
- Tries scored: 117 (9.75 per match)
- Top scorer: (New Zealand) Honey Hireme (52)
- Top try scorer: (New Zealand) Honey Hireme (13)

The 2017 Women's Rugby League World Cup was the fifth staging of the Women's Rugby League World Cup and was held in Australia between 16 November and 2 December 2017. Pool and semi-final matches was held at Southern Cross Group Stadium in Sydney, with the final held at Brisbane Stadium. The final was played as a double-header with the men's final.

== Teams ==
Team	Nickname	Coach	Captain
Australia	Jillaroos	Brad Donald	Renae Kunst
Canada	Ravens	Mike Castle	Mandy Marchak
Cook Islands	Moana	Ian Bourke	
England	Lionesses	Chris Chapman	Andrea Dobson
New Zealand	Kiwi Ferns	Tony Benson	Laura Mariu
Papua New Guinea	Orchids	Dennis Miall	Cathy Neap

=== Qualifying ===
Five teams (Australia, New Zealand, England, Papua New Guinea, and Canada) qualified automatically for the World Cup.

A round-robin tournament featuring the Cook Islands, Fiji, Samoa, and Tonga was scheduled to have been held at St Marys, New South Wales, Australia, to determine the sixth and final team: however, Fiji, Samoa, and Tonga all withdrew at short notice due to various logistical issues. Therefore, the tournament was scratched, and the Cook Islands qualified automatically.

== Pre-tournament matches ==
Before the World Cup it was announced that France would host England in two tests in Perpignan, and Papua New Guinea would host Australia in Port Moresby.

21 June 2017

France	16 – 26	England

Stade de la Mer, Perpignan

24 June 2017

France	8 – 14	England

Stade de la Mer, Perpignan

23 September 2017

Papua New Guinea	4 – 42	Australia

National Football Stadium, Port Moresby

6 October 2017

Canada	26 – 20	Corrimal Cougars

King George Park, Richmond, British Columbia

8 October 2017

Canada	18 – 20	Corrimal Cougars

King George Park, Richmond, British Columbia

20 October 2017

Far North Queensland	30 – 6	Papua New Guinea

Billy Slater Oval, Callendar Park, Innisfail, Queensland

4 November 2017

New Zealand	32 – 12	New Zealand Māori Wahine Toa

Waikato Stadium, Hamilton

10 November 2017

Queensland Nga Hau e Wha Māori	38 – 12	Canada

Owen Park, Southport, Queensland

== Venues ==
All the matches were played at Endeavour Field (Southern Cross Group Stadium) in Sydney, with the exception of the final which was played in the larger Brisbane Stadium in Brisbane.

Brisbane	Sydney
Brisbane Stadium	Endeavour Field
Capacity: 52,500	Capacity: 22,000
2017 Women's Rugby League World Cup is located in Australia

== Pool stage ==
The two pools feature three teams each. The top two teams in each pool will qualify for the semi-finals. Pool play will involve a round robin with an additional inter-pool game for each team so all teams will play three pool games.

Key to colours in pool tables
Advance to the semi-finals

=== Pool A ===
Team	Pld	W	D	L	PF	PA	+/−	Pts
Australia	3	3	0	0	184	4	+180	6
England	3	1	0	2	52	68	-16	2
Cook Islands	3	1	0	2	26	150	-124	2

==== Australia v. Cook Islands ====
16 November 2017
16:00 AEDT (UTC+11)

Australia	58 – 4	Cook Islands
Tries: Caitlyn Moran (6', 78') 2 Brittany Breayley (11') 1 Karina Brown (15') 1 Ali Brigginshaw (21') 1 Vanessa Foliaki (25') 1 Talesha Quinn (32') 1 Isabelle Kelly (36') 1 Nakia Davis-Welsh (49') 1 Meg Ward (53') 1 Lavina O'Mealey (57') 1 Goals: Maddie Studdon 4 (38', 50', 55', 79'); Caitlyn Moran 3 (16', 22', 26')	1st: 36 – 0; 2nd: 22 – 4 Report	Tries: 1 (74') Chantelle Inangaro Schofield

Southern Cross Group Stadium, Sydney
Referee: Antoinette Watts

==== Australia v. England ====
19 November 2017
13:45 AEDT (UTC+11)

Australia	38 – 0	England
Tries: Meg Ward (19', 64') 2 Isabell Kelly (7') 1 Nakia Davis-Welsh (12') 1 Chelsea Baker (22') 1 Elianna Walton (29') 1 Kezie Apps (44') 1 Caitlyn Moran (61') 1 Goals: Chelsea Baker 2 (13', 30'); Caitlyn Moran 1 ('62)	1st: 28 – 0; 2nd: 10 – 0 Report

Southern Cross Group Stadium, Sydney
Referee: Todd Smith

==== England v. Cook Islands ====
22 November 2017
13:45 AEDT (UTC+11)

England	16 – 22	Cook Islands
Tries: Emma Slowe (47') 1 Amy Hardcastle (54') 1 Kayleigh Bulman (76') 1 Goals: Claire Garner 2 (48', 56')	1st: 0 – 16; 2nd: 16 – 6 Report	Tries: 1 (2') Beniamina Koiatu; 1 (30') Katelyn Arona; 1 (34') Cecelia Strickland; 1 (80') Te Amohaere Ngata-Aerengamate; Goals: 3 Chantelle Inangaro Schofield (31', 35', 80')

Southern Cross Group Stadium, Sydney
Referee: Jake Sutherland

=== Pool B ===
Team	Pld	W	D	L	PF	PA	+/−	Pts
New Zealand	3	3	0	0	164	4	+160	6
Canada	3	1	0	2	26	146	-120	2
Papua New Guinea	3	0	0	3	16	96	-80	0

==== New Zealand v. Canada ====
16 November 2017
13:45 AEDT (UTC+11)

New Zealand	50 – 4	Canada
Tries: Honey Hireme (4', 37') 2 Lilieta Maumau (49', 73') 2 Teuila Fotu-Moala (56', 66') 2 Atawhai Tupaea (16') 1 Krystal Murray (52') 1 Apii Nicholls-Pualau (60') 1 Goals: Kimiora Nati 7 (17', 38', 50', 53', 61', 67', 74')	1st: 16 – 4; 2nd: 34– 0 Report	Tries: 1 (12') Megan Pakulis

Southern Cross Group Stadium, Sydney
Referee: Jake Sutherland

==== Papua New Guinea v. Canada ====
19 November 2017
18:30 AEDT (UTC+11)

Papua New Guinea	8 – 22	Canada
Tries: Christie Bulhage (11') 1 Martha Karl (44') 1	1st: 4 – 10; 2nd: 4 – 12; Report	Tries: 3 (25', 29', 76') Natasha Smith; 1 (59') Sabrina McDaid; Goals: 2 Irene Patrinos (26', 77'); 1 Sabrina McDaid (60')

Southern Cross Group Stadium, Sydney
Referee: Joey Butler

==== New Zealand v. Papua New Guinea ====
22 November 2017
18:30 AEDT (UTC+11)

New Zealand	38 – 0	Papua New Guinea
Tries: Amber Kani (48', 76') 2 Luisa Gago (5') 1 Raecene McGregor (10') 1 Hilda Peters (44') 1 Maitua Feterika (51') 1 Atawhai Tupaea (57') 1 Racquel Anderson (63') 1 Annetta Nuuausala (71') 1 Goals: Racquel Anderson 1 (52')	1st: 8 – 0; 2nd: 30 – 0 Report

Southern Cross Group Stadium, Sydney
Referee: Tyson Brough

=== Inter-pool matches ===
==== England v. Papua New Guinea ====
16 November 2017
18:30 AEDT (UTC+11)

England	36 – 8	Papua New Guinea
Tries: Charlotte Booth (39', 73') 2 Shona Hoyle (11') 1 Amy Hardcastle (28') 1 Tara-Jane Stanley (35') 1 Danielle Bound (59') 1 Beth Sutcliffe (79') 1 Goals: Tara-Jane Stanley 4 (13', 60', 74', 80')	1st: 18 – 8; 2nd: 18 – 0 Report	Tries: 1 (6') Naomi Kaupa; 1 (20') Anne Oiufa

Southern Cross Group Stadium, Sydney
Referee: Tyson Brough

==== New Zealand v. Cook Islands ====
19 November 2017
16:00 AEDT (UTC+11)

New Zealand	76 – 0	Cook Islands
Tries: Honey Hireme (9', 30', 35', 44', 51', 69') 6 Shontelle Woodman (24', 32') 2 Krystal Murray (27', 76') 2 Raecene McGregor (54', 57') 2 Lilieta Maumau (19') 1 Nita Maynard (62') 1 Goals: Kimiora Nati 10 (20', 28', 31', 34', 36', 46', 56', 63', 71', 77')	1st: 38 – 0; 2nd: 38 – 0 Report

Southern Cross Group Stadium, Sydney
Referee: Bianca Zietsman

==== Australia v. Canada ====
22 November 2017
16:00 AEDT (UTC+11)

Australia	88 – 0	Canada
Tries: Vanessa Foliaki (3', 53', 62') 3 Zahara Temara (10', 26', 33') 3 Elianna Walton (58', 58', 76') 3 Karina Brown (65', 71', 79') 3 Corban McGregor (15', 30') 2 Chelsea Baker (21', 68') 2 Maddie Stutton (23') 1 Ruan Sims (38') 1 Goals: Maddie Studdon 8 (16', 22', 31', 39', 47', 60', 69', 77')	1st: 44 – 0; 2nd: 44 – 0 Report

Southern Cross Group Stadium, Sydney
Referee: Joey Butler

== Knockout stage ==
Semifinals
A1	Australia	58
B2	Canada	6
B1	New Zealand	52
A2	England	4

Finals
A1	Australia	23
B1	New Zealand	16

=== Semi-finals ===
26 November 2017
13:45 AEDT (UTC+11)

New Zealand	52 – 4	England
Tries: Honey Hireme (46', 57', 78') 3 Krystal Murray (16', 63') 2 Maitua Feterika (2') 1 Shontelle Woodman (6') 1 Teuila Fotu-Moala (51') 1 Hilda Peters (67') 1 Lilieta Maumau (70') 1 Laura Mariu (80') 1 Goals: Kimiora Nati 4 (17', 52', 64', 71')	1st: 14 – 4; 2nd: 38 – 0 Report	Tries: 1 (22') Tara-Jane Stanley

Southern Cross Group Stadium, Sydney
Referee: Todd Smith

26 November 2017
16:00 AEDT (UTC+11)

Australia	58 – 6	Canada
Tries: Ali Brigginshaw (2', 40') 2 Steph Hancock (6', 68') 2 Isabelle Kelly (9', 21') 2 Karina Brown (18', 29') 2 Talesha Quinn (37') 1 Ruan Sims (57') 1 Nakia Davis-Welsh (61') 1 Goals: Caitlyn Moran 7 (3', 7', 23', 38', 40', 58', 70')	1st: 42 – 0; 2nd: 16 – 6 Report	Tries: 1 (48') Natasha Smith; Goals: 1 Irene Patrinos (49')

Southern Cross Group Stadium, Sydney
Referee: Adam Gee

=== Final: Australia v New Zealand ===
2 December 2017
15:45 AEST (UTC+10)

Australia	23 – 16	New Zealand
Tries: Isabelle Kelly (8' 53') 2 Caitlin Moran (36') 1 Elianna Walton (57') 1 Goals: Caitlin Moran 3/4 (9', 37', 58'); Field Goals: Caitlin Moran (80') 1	1st: 12 – 10; 2nd: 11 – 6 Report	Tries: 2 (12' 20') Honey Hireme; 1 (69') Raecene McGregor; Goals: 2/3 Kimiora Nati (14', 70')

Brisbane Stadium, Brisbane
Referee: Adam Gee

== Try scorers ==
13

- (New Zealand) Honey Hireme

6

- (Australia) Karina Brown
- (Australia) Isabelle Kelly

5

- (New Zealand) Krystal Murray
- (Australia) Elianna Walton

4

- (Australia) Vanessa Foliaki
- (New Zealand) Lilieta Maumau
- (Canada) Natasha Smith
- (Australia) Caitlyn Moran
- (New Zealand) Raecene McGregor

3

- (Australia) Chelsea Baker
- (Australia) Ali Brigginshaw
- (Australia) Nakia Davis-Welsh
- (New Zealand) Teuila Fotu-Moala
- (Australia) Zahara Temara
- (Australia) Meg Ward
- (New Zealand) Shontelle Woodman

2

- (England) Charlotte Booth
- (New Zealand) Matiua Feterika
- (Australia) Steph Hancock
- (England) Amy Hardcastle
- (New Zealand) Amber Kani
- (Australia) Corban McGregor
- (New Zealand) Hilda Peters
- (Australia) Talesha Quinn
- (Australia) Ruan Sims
- (England) Tara-Jane Stanley
- (New Zealand) Atawhai Tupaea

1

- (New Zealand) Racquel Anderson
- (Australia) Kezie Apps
- (Cook Islands) Katelyn Arona
- (England) Danielle Bound
- (Australia) Brittany Breayley
- (Papua New Guinea) Christie Bulhage
- (England) Kayleigh Bulman
- (New Zealand) Luisa Gago
- (England) Shona Hoyle
- (Cook Islands) Chantelle Inangaro Schofield
- (Papua New Guinea) Martha Karl
- (Papua New Guinea) Naomi Kaupa
- (Cook Islands) Beniamina Koiatu
- (New Zealand) Laura Mariu
- (New Zealand) Nita Maynard
- (Canada) Sabrina McDaid
- (Cook Islands) Te Amohaere Ngata-Aerengamate
- (New Zealand) Apii Nicholls-Pualau
- (New Zealand) Annetta Nuuausala
- (Papua New Guinea) Anne Oiufa
- (Australia) Lavina O'Mealey
- (Canada) Megan Pakulis
- (England) Emma Slowe
- (Cook Islands) Cecelia Strickland
- (Australia) Maddie Studdon
- (England) Beth Sutcliffe

== Broadcasting ==
Country	Broadcaster	Matches
Australia	Seven Network	All 12 matches live
New Zealand	Sky Sport	All 12 matches live
Papua New Guinea	EMTV	All 12 matches live

== See also ==
- Women's rugby league
