= Natasha Smith (rugby league) =

Canada international rugby footballer

Natasha Smith is a Canadian dual-code international rugby footballer. She represented Canada at rugby sevens at the 2013 Summer Universiade before the making her debut in 2015 for the national rugby union team and the national rugby league team in 2017.

== Playing career ==
=== Club career ===
Smith has played rugby union for Carleton Ravens and Barrhaven Scottish.

=== Representative career ===
In 2013, Smith was in the Canada squad for the 2013 Summer Universiade rugby sevens competition in which Canada won the bronze medal, and in 2014 when Canada won the gold medal at the FISU World University Rugby Sevens Championship.

Smith was named in the Canada women's national rugby union team for the Women's Rugby Super Series in 2015.

In 2017, Smith converted to rugby league representing the newly established Canada women's national rugby league team that competed at the 2017 Rugby League World Cup. On 19 November, Smith became the first player to score a hat trick for the Ravens as Canada defeated Papua New Guinea 22–8 to record their first ever win at the World Cup. Smith also scored the only try for Canada in their semi-final defeat to Australia.
