= Raecene McGregor =

New Zealand international rugby league player

Personal information
- Born: Raecene McGregor; 23 October 1997 (age 29) Randwick, New South Wales, Australia
- Height: 162 cm (5 ft 4 in)
- Weight: 71 kg (11 st 3 lb)

Playing information
- Position: Five-eighth
Club
Years	Team	Pld	T	G	FG	P
2018	St George Illawarra Dragons	3	0	0	0	0
2019–20	Brisbane Broncos	8	1	0	0	4
2021–22	Sydney Roosters	12	0	0	0	0
2023–25	St George Illawarra Dragons	25	1	45	0	94
2026–	Wests Tigers	5	3	16	0	44
	Total	53	5	61	0	142
Representative
Years	Team	Pld	T	G	FG	P
2017–	New Zealand	23	12	5	0	58
2019	New Zealand 9s	4	2	5	0	19
2020	Māori All Stars	3	0	0	0	0
- Source: RLP As of 22 November 2026
Medals
Women's rugby sevens
Representing Australia
Youth Olympic Games
Gold medal – first place	2014 Nanjing	Team competition

Raecene McGregor (born 23 October 1997) is a New Zealand rugby league footballer who plays for Wests Tigers, in the NRL Women's Premiership.

Primarily a halfback she is a New Zealand international, Dally M Medallist and Golden Boot winner and has won three NRLW premierships, two with the Brisbane Broncos and one with the Sydney Roosters.

== Background ==
McGregor was born in Sydney to New Zealand parents and attended Bass Hill High School. She represented Australia in rugby sevens at the 2014 Summer Youth Olympics, winning a gold medal. She also represented New South Wales and Australia in soccer and touch rugby. She played for the Macquarie University Rays during the University Sevens competition.

== Playing career ==
In 2016, McGregor played in the NSWRL Women's Premiership for the Greenacre Tigers. In 2017, she represented New Zealand at the 2017 Women's Rugby League World Cup. On 2 December 2017, she started at five-eighth in New Zealand's final loss to Australia, scoring a try.

In June 2018, McGregor joined the St George Illawarra Dragons ahead of the inaugural NRL Women's Premiership. In Round 1 of the 2018 NRL Women's season, she made her debut for the Dragons in their 4–30 loss to the Brisbane Broncos.

In 2019, she joined the Brisbane Broncos Women. On 6 October 2019, she started at five-eighth and scored a try in the Broncos' 30–6 Grand Final win over the Dragons. Later that month, she was a member of New Zealand's 2019 Rugby League World Cup 9s-winning squad.

On 8 January 2020, she signed with the Wests Tigers for the 2020 NSWRL Women's Premiership season. On 22 February, McGregor represented the Māori All Stars in their 4–10 loss to the Indigenous All Stars.

On 25 October 2020, McGregor won her second NRLW premiership with the Broncos, starting at five-eighth in their 20–10 Grand Final win over the Sydney Roosters Women.

On 1 November 2020, McGregor was named in the top 3 players in the world on the official NRL site.

In late September 2022, McGregor was named as the winner of the 2022 NRLW Dally M Medal. McGregor was also named in the NRL'S NRLW Team of the Year and in the Dream Team announced by the Rugby League Players Association. The team was selected by the players, who each cast one vote for each position. McGregor also took out the RLPA's highest individual honour, the Players' Champion award.

In April 2022, McGregor was a part of the Sydney Roosters team that won the delayed 2021 NRLW competition, which the Roosters won defeating the St George Illawarra Dragons, 16–4.

In October 2022, she was selected for the New Zealand squad at the delayed 2021 Women's Rugby League World Cup in England, alongside younger sister Page.

In April 2023, McGregor signed a one-year contract to return to the St George Illawarra Dragons. A few months later she was appointed as captain of the club.

Raecene signed a two-year extension with the Dragons in September 2023, keeping her with the club until the end of 2025.

On 8 October 2025, McGregor signed a two-year deal with the Wests Tigers.
