= Honey Hireme =

New Zealand dual code international rugby player

Honey Hireme-Smiler MNZM
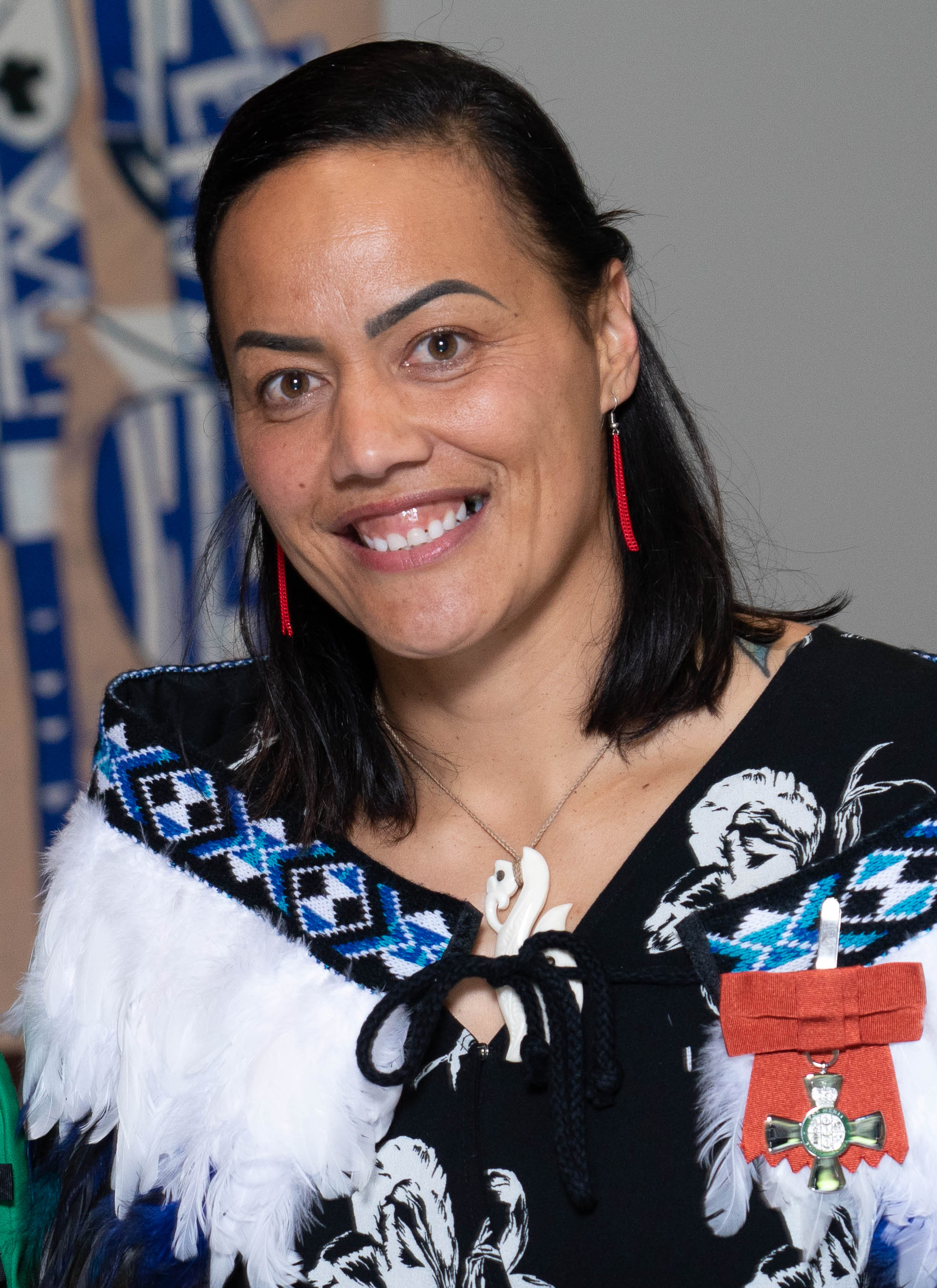
- Hireme in 2021

Personal information
- Born: 3 May 1981 (age 45) Putāruru, Waikato, New Zealand
- Height: 1.72 m (5 ft 7 1/2 in)
- Weight: 82 kg (12 st 13 lb)

Playing information
Club
Years	Team	Pld	T	G	FG	P
	Papakura
2018	St George Illawarra	3	1	0	0	4
	Total	3	1	0	0	4
Representative
Years	Team	Pld	T	G	FG	P
2008–20	New Zealand	16	32	0	0	128

Rugby union career
Provincial / State sides
Years	Team	Apps	(Points)
2001–2016	Waikato	36	(160)
International career
Years	Team	Apps	(Points)
2014–2017	New Zealand	16	(75)
National sevens team
Years	Team		Comps
2013-2016	New Zealand 7s		11 tournaments 45 tries 225 points

Arneta Honey Hireme-Smiler MNZM (born 3 May 1981) is a former New Zealand rugby football player who has represented her country in rugby league, rugby sevens and rugby union. Due to her multi-sport career, Hireme-Smiler has been referred to as Honey Bill Williams, in reference to her New Zealand male counterpart Sonny Bill Williams.

== Early life ==
Arneta Honey Hireme-Smiler was born on 3 May 1981 in Putaruru Maternity Hospital to Caryn Ngarewa Hireme and Leonard Charles Hunter and was to spend her early life in Putāruru in the South Waikato. At the time of her birth her father was working at the Pinedale Timber Mill and later became a bushman in Tokoroa and then worked at the Kinleith pulp and paper mill. Hireme-Smiler was born with a club foot which was corrected by surgery a days after she was born, which resulted in her departing hospital with her foot in a cast. The club foot was hereditary and appeared in other members of her family. She has a two brothers, Buddy and Quintin as well as two older two step-sisters Coralie and Joan via her father's previous relationship.

While her mothers details were entered on her birth certificate, her father's weren't even though he was living with her mother and drove her to the hospital and waited outside. Her parents married when she was five. She spent her childhood as Honey Hunter. When she learnt of the lack of a father on the birth certificate, she asked her father for the approximately $150 needed to legally add his name, he refused, considering it a needless waste of money. Soon after getting her drivers licence at 17 as Arneta Hireme she had a disagreement with her father and as payback took her birth certificate to school and requested that henceforth Hireme be used as her surname.

Her parents relationship was tumultuous and at times violent, driven by alcohol consumption during the weekends and led at one stage to her mother briefly taking herself and her children to a Women's Refuge in Auckland When they were older Hireme-Smiler and Buddy would often ring the police late at night to ask them to come and restore the peace. Her father was passionate about rugby league and so disliked rugby union that he would mow his lawn during All Blacks just to annoy his neighbours wanting to watch or listen to the game.

Following her primary school education at Oraka Heights Primary School she attended Putaruru High School. After competing a business administration course at Waiariki Polytech and was able to obtain a position in Te Awamutu at Te Wānanga o Aotearoa. In 2009 she took up a position as a project manager for Hauora Waikato.

== Rugby league career ==
Due to her father's love of the game Hireme-Smiler was exposed to rugby league at an early age and at the age of five began playing for Putaruru Dragons and then progressed into the senior women's grades playing for the Papakura Sea Eagles club in the Auckland Rugby League women's competition. She has represented Counties Manukau, Bay of plenty, Waikato and Waicoa Bay in the New Zealand Rugby League's women's competition over her 20-year career at representative level.

Hireme-Smiler has played in four Rugby League World Cups, she played for the Kiwiferns in the 2003 Women's world cup 2008 and 2013 World Cups. She captained the team in 2013. She was named in the world women's rugby league in all 4 world cup tournaments, and also awarded player of the Tournament in 2013.

=== 2017 Women's Rugby League World Cup ===
Due to a shoulder injury she had missed out on selection for the 2017 Rugby World Cup but still hoped that she could still play in the 2017 Women's Rugby League World Cup which was to be held in Australia between 16 November and 2 December 2017. At a consultation with Auckland orthopaedic surgeon Stewart Walsh, he informed her it would take six to eight weeks to recover from a full repair, which meant that she would miss the tournament. He was however able to do a part repair which meant that provided her shoulder was pumped full of cortisone and strapped in a certain way it was possible for her to play, with it best that she avoided making any hard tackles. The team coach Tony Benson accepted her assurance that despite the injury she was fit to play and assigned her to the wing. In pool play she scored six tries against the Cook Islands and three in the semi-final against England. Starting the final against Australia as vice-captain she took over the captaincy for the last 10 minutes, the team losing 23-16. She ended the tournament with 13 tries, compared with six for the next highest scorers. She was also a finalist for player of the tournament.

Following the tournament she underwent a full surgical repair of her shoulder.

In June 2018, Hireme-Smiler joined the St. George Illawarra Dragons ahead of the inaugural NRL Women's Premiership commencing in September 2018.

She co-captained the New Zealand women's rugby league team, with Laura Mariu, between the pair they had over 36 years of experience at international level. She was awarded New Zealand women's rugby league player of the year in 2018, her third time winning top honours. She was also a finalist in 2018 for the International Women's Golden boot award.

== Rugby union career ==
=== Sevens ===
Hireme-Smiler began playing rugby sevens in the early 2000s during the summer, ending up in a Bay of Plenty sevens team coached by Peter Joseph.

She later commented, “Physically and mentally, PJ took my game to a whole new level. Sevens is a different beast to league with all the fitness but he never doubted our rugby knowledge and let us play, The way the team hooked you in was addictive. The girls became your sisters and we stayed in touch years after it happened. PJ helped many girls through hard times. We were trailblazers really.”

She initially played on the wing where her then poor passing was less critical. Compared with the fifteen-a-aside game where she didn't get much ball Hireme-Smiler found it fast, exciting and she got to handle the ball more often. Three nights a week she would travel to Rotorua to train with the other women alongside the Bay of Plenty men's sevens team, with another two nights a week devoted also at Rotorua to fitness training under fitness coach Mark Edmonds.

Through Joseph the 21 year old Hireme-Smiler became a member of the Aotearoa Māori team that defeated the United States at a tournament in Whangarei in 2002. Her parents attended and even her father was impressed by sevens. When Joseph took up an invitation to take the Aotearoa Māori to the 2002 Hong Kong sevens tournament Hireme-Smiler was a member. She had to fund raise to cover the costs with some provided by sponsorships from her employer Te Wānanga o Aotearoa who also gave her special leave so that she could be paid by them while she was away. The team scored 159 unanswered points before defeating the United States in the final 14-7.

She returned with Aotearoa Māori to Hong Kong to win the 2003, 2004 and 2005 events. Also with Aotearoa Māori she completed in and won the 2010 and 2011 Roma rugby sevens titles. She was co-captain in 2011.

In 2012 the New Zealand Rugby Union organized a nationwide "Go for Gold" grassroots initiative to identify talent with the potential to represent New Zealand in the Sevens competition at the 2016 Summer Olympics, where rugby sevens was making its debut.

When she heard about "Go for Gold" it rekindled the thought she once had when she competed in athletics to go to the Olympics. Despite having just turned 31 she thought she had a chance due to her prior sevens experience. was one of the oldest applicants approximately 800 women turned up at 14 trials held around the country. She was nursing an injury at the time of the Waikato trial and instead was asked to assist with talent spotting, collecting information and making notes. She was one of 50 selected to attend a training camp at Waiouru. Here they were exposed to the exhausting 80-60-40 shuttle runs consisting of a 80 metre sprints followed by a 60 metre sprint back and then a 40 metre sprint developed by Gordon Tietjens for men on the final day they were split into teams which played three games against other with each game followed by a 80-60-40.

She didn’t make the team for Oceania and while she attended the training camp for the inaugural 2012–13 IRB Women's Sevens World Series series she wasn’t selected for the first tournament which was held in Dubal. She was the one of the oldest in the team which had an average age of 23. Allan Bunting put a lot of effort into one-on-one training while in camp to improve her weak left to right passing, the pair often getting up at 5.30 am to practice on the beach. They were soon joined by Ruby Tui who also had a poor passing technique. She took the opportunity to play for the Waikato team which lost 36-17 to Manawatu in the 2013 final of the national sevens tournament held in Queenstown on 13–14 January 2013. Her performance was sufficient to impress the national coach and she was selected for the Houston tournament.

After an outstanding performance at the recent national sevens championship in Queenstown. Hireme-Smiler made her debut for the New Zealand sevens team at second round of the internal series, which was held in Houston on 1–2 February 2013.

Following Houston she was among the 26 players who were selected in late February 2013 for a core high performance squad which it was intended would form the basis of New Zealand's attempt to win both that year's Rugby World Cup Sevens but also the Olympics in 2016.

She played in the third tournament of the series which was held at Guangzhou on 30 and 31 March 2013.

That year she finished the inaugural World Series as the leading try scorer.

==== 2013 World Cup ====
In 2013 she was a member of the team that won the 2013 Sevens World Cup which was held in Moscow on 29 and 30 June 2013. She scored a try in the 29-12 success over Canada in the rain soaked final.

Following the event, while the rest of the team returned to New Zealand she travelled to England to participate for New Zealand in the Rugby League World Cup in Leeds.

She then returned to sevens duty as a member of the New Zealand team which came third in the 2013 Oceania Women's Sevens Championship which was held in Noosa in October 2013.

In January 2014 she was among the first 19 women seven players awarded a professional contract While the amount was not sufficient to allow a full-time commitment, it allowed her the option to work and train part-time.

After taking a break in 2014 to play for the New Zealand fifteen-a-side team she was awarded a 12 month contract in January 2015 to play for the sevens team.

By the start of the 2015-2016 season she was noticing that she was no longer as quick as she had once been. In the Dubai tournament of the 2015-2016 Sevens series she acquired a hip flexor injury and picked up a number of niggling injuries, with a back injury during training at the China tournament which eventually forced her to be pulled from the second half of the final and demoted to a travelling reserve for San Paolo the rest of the season.

==== 2016 ====
In January 2016 she was selected as a member of the squad of 22 from which it was intended that 12 players would be selected for the New Zealand sevens team to compete at the 2016 Olympic Games.

After completing the training session in Hamilton prior to training camp in Fiji it was discovered that she had torn a cartridge which ruled her out of going to Fiji. She began a rehab plan and thought she had a 60-40 chance of still being selected.

Hireme-Smiler was at home when she received the telephone call from the coach Sean Horan that she hadn’t made the team for Rio, as they were concerned that she would only be back to full fitness by August. Hireme in her autobiography considered at the time that “80 percent of Honey is still better than a lot of players...”

She reacted by becoming drunk within 90 minutes, before later in the day attending a “Let’s feel sorry for ourselves” meal at Carla Hohepa’s house. She then spent a few days on her own at a bach in the Coromandel coming to terms with the decision. Her father had already purchased a travel package to watch her in Rio which fortunately he was able to cancel. She subsequently decided to retire from playing professional sevens rugby again, taking a $30,000 payout from New Zealand Rugby, she was 35.

In total she appeared in 11 tournaments helping New Zealand win the 2013 World Cup and series titles in 2013, 2014 and 2015 as well as winning 37 consecutive games in 2014 and 2015, ending her career with 45 tries.

=== Fifteen-a-side ===
Hireme-Smiler began her rugby union career with Melville in 2001. She had a season with Waikato University's senior representative side in 2005.

She was selected for the Waikato women's provincial team in 2012 and continued with them in 2013, 2014 and 2016, playing a total of 18 provincial games, during which she scored 17 tries (85 points).

She was playing rugby for the Waikato representative team when in 2002 she was invited to a Black Ferns training camp in Palmerston North by coach Darryl Suasua. When she told them that it clashed with a Kiwi Ferns training camp she told she had to choose between the codes. She decided to stay committed to league at a national league and as a result for a number of years was not considered the national rugby union side.

She finally made her Black Ferns debut as no. 176 on 1 June 2014 at Rotorua playing on the right wing during which she scored a try in the second half to contribute to the team’s 38-3 defeat of Australia. She was 33 years and 29 days old. Only senior players with 20 or more test caps were allowed to sit in the back seat of the team bus, but because of her age Hireme was allowed in her rookie year to sit in the row in front of them.

She then played in the 90-12 defeat of Samoa on 7 June 2014 at Auckland and the 33-21 defeat of Canada on 14 June 2014 at Whakatane.

She was then selected for the 2014 Women's Rugby World Cup, In the game against the United States on 17 August 2014 she scored four tries. With 10 tries she was the top scorer at the tournament and was selected for the World Cup Dream Team. She was also named in that year’s World XV team.

In 2015 she played in three games of the Women's Rugby Super Series which was held in Canada.

She then played in the 2016 Laurie O'Reilly Cup against the Australia, scoring tries in both test matches.

She finished 2016 with the Black Fern on a northern tour in November that saw them defeat first England 25-20 in London and then Ireland 38-8 in Dublin.

In the Possibles v Probables trial game at Palmerston North to select the team to play in the 2017 Rugby World Cup she injured a bicep tendon in her shoulder but after receiving a cortisone injection was able to play through the four-nation Women's Rugby Super Series in June, Her last game for the Black Ferns was in the 21-29 loss to England at Rotorua on 17 June 2017 with her playing the game with her shoulder heavily strapped. By now the injury needed significant surgery which meant she was not selected for the Rugby World Cup.

This bought an end to her international rugby union fifteen-a-side career, during which she played in 18 tests of which 16 were won and two lost, scoring 15 tries (75 points) All of her games had been played on the wing.

She fully retired from rugby union in 2019 as player/coach of the Melville women's Premier rugby team.

== Personal life ==
As the result of a brief relationship she became pregnant and subsequently gave birth in 2004 to a son Karasharn Manauri Hunter, who like her was born with a club foot.

Through club rugby she met single mother Rochelle Smiler in 2012 and they were soon playing together in the Waikato team. Their friendship led to a deeper relationship and the couple marrying seven years later in the chapel at Waikato Hospital in late August 2019. The location was chosen as Hireme’s mother Caryn was receiving treatment for terminal cancer at the hospital and it would be difficult to leave. The couple adopted the surname Hireme-Smiler.

Smiler bought her children Kieran and Tyronne to the marriage.

== Honours and awards ==
She was:

- the New Zealand Rugby League's women's player of the year in 2007, 2012 and 2017.
- Gallagher Waikato sportswomen of the year in 2013 and 2014
- Player of the Tournament in the 2013 Women's Rugby League World Cup.
- Waikato women's rugby player of the year in 2013, 2014, 2015 and 2016.
- Top try scorer and player of the tournament finalist for the 2017 Rugby League World Cup.
- Appointed a Member of the New Zealand Order of Merit, for services to rugby league in the 2020 New Year Honours.

== Bibliography ==
- Hireme-Smiler, Honey; McFadden, Suzanne (2024). Honey: My Storey of Love, Loss and Victory (Softcover). Auckland: David Bateman. ISBN 978-1-77689-074-3.
