= Heather Ballinger =

Australian rugby league player (born 1982)

Personal information
- Born: 29 July 1982 (age 44) Longreach, Queensland, Australia
- Height: 175 cm (5 ft 9 in)
- Weight: 83 kg (13 st 1 lb)

Playing information
- Position: Prop
Club
Years	Team	Pld	T	G	FG	P
2018	Brisbane Broncos	4	1	0	0	4
Representative
Years	Team	Pld	T	G	FG	P
2009–19	Queensland	11	0	0	0	0
2011–17	Australia	12	1	0	0	4
2011–16	Women's All Stars	6	0	0	0	0
- Source: RLP As of 6 October 2020

Heather Jayne Ballinger (born 29 July 1982) is an Australian former rugby league footballer played for the Brisbane Broncos in the NRL Women's Premiership.

Primarily a prop, she represented Australia and Queensland and won a premiership with the Broncos in 2018.

== Background ==
Ballinger attended Scots PGC College in Warwick, Queensland, where she represented Queensland in shot put. Outside of sports, she works as a police officer.

== Playing career ==
In 2007, Ballinger began playing rugby league for Ivanhoes in Cairns, winning the CDRL Women's League. In 2010, she was named the CDRL Women's Player of the Year.

In 2011, she made her debut for Australia in their 42–14 win over Samoa in Apia.

In 2013, she was a member of Australia's 2013 Women's Rugby League World Cup-winning squad.

In October 2017, she was named in Australia's 2017 Women's Rugby League World Cup squad. On 2 December, she started at prop in the Jillaroos 23-16 final win over the New Zealand.

In June 2018, Ballinger, along with Ali Brigginshaw, Brittany Breayley, Teuila Fotu-Moala and Caitlyn Moran, were named as the five marquee players for the Brisbane Broncos women's team which commenced playing in the NRL Women's Premiership in September. On 29 September 2018, she started at prop and scored a try in the Broncos' 34–12 Grand Final win over the Sydney Roosters.

On 13 October 2018, she played her final game for Australia, winning Player of the Match in a 26–24 win over New Zealand at Mt Smart Stadium.

In May 2019, she represented Queensland Country at the NRL Women's National Championships. In August 2019, she returned to the Broncos NRLW squad, but did not play a game for the side.

On 11 February 2020, she announced her retirement from State of Origin, after 11 years of representing Queensland. In March 2020, she joined the Tweed Heads Seagulls in the newly established QRL Women's Premiership.

== Achievements and accolades ==
=== Individual ===
- QRL Representative Player of the Year: 2015

=== Team ===
- 2013 Women's Rugby League World Cup: Australia – Winners
- 2017 Women's Rugby League World Cup: Australia – Winners
- 2018 NRLW Grand Final: Brisbane Broncos – Winners
