= Kimiora Breayley-Nati =

New Zealand and Cook Islands international rugby league footballer

Personal information
- Born: Kimiora Nati; 17 June 1988 (age 37) Auckland, New Zealand
- Height: 168 cm (5 ft 6 in)
- Weight: 73 kg (11 st 7 lb)

Playing information
- Position: Five-eighth, Halfback
Club
Years	Team	Pld	T	G	FG	P
2018	Brisbane Broncos	4	3	0	0	12
2019	St George Illawarra	1	0	0	0	0
2021–22	Gold Coast Titans	11	0	4	0	8
	Total	16	3	4	0	20
Representative
Years	Team	Pld	T	G	FG	P
2017–18	New Zealand	6	0	23	0	46
2022	Cook Islands	2	0	0	0	0
- Source: RLP As of 14 November 2022
- Spouse: Brittany Breayley-Nati

Kimiora Breayley-Nati (née Nati; born 17 June 1988) is a New Zealand rugby league footballer who plays for the Burleigh Bears in the QRL Women's Premiership.

Primarily a five-eighth, she is a New Zealand representative. She previously played for the Brisbane Broncos and St George Illawarra Dragons in the NRL Women's Premiership, winning a premiership with the Broncos in 2018.

== Background ==
Brealey-Nati was born in Auckland and is of Cook Island descent. She played her junior rugby league for the Manurewa Marlins.

== Playing career ==
In 2017, Breayley-Nati represented New Zealand at the 2017 Women's Rugby League World Cup. On 2 December 2017, she started at halfback in New Zealand's 16–23 final loss to Australia. She was the Kiwi Ferns' primary goal kicker throughout the tournament, kicking 23 goals.

On 28 June 2018, Breayley-Nati signed with the Brisbane Broncos NRL Women's Premiership team. In Round 1 of the 2018 NRL Women's season, she made her debut for the Broncos in a 30–4 win over the St George Illawarra Dragons.

On 30 September 2018, Breayley-Nati scored three tries in the Broncos' 34–12 Grand Final win over the Sydney Roosters. She was awarded the inaugural Karyn Murphy Medal for Player of the Match. On 13 October 2018, she started at halfback in New Zealand's 24–26 loss to Australia. During the loss, she ruptured her anterior cruciate ligament and tore he meniscus.

On 26 June 2019, she joined the St George Illawarra Dragons NRLW team. In July 2019, she represented the Cook Islands at the 2019 Pacific Games. In Round 1 of the 2019 NRL Women's season, she made her debut for the Dragons in a 4–14 loss to the Brisbane Broncos. She played just one game for the Dragons, missing the rest of the season due to a heart condition.
