= Nita Maynard =

Australia and New Zealand international rugby union & league footballer (born 1992)

Nita Maynard-Perrin
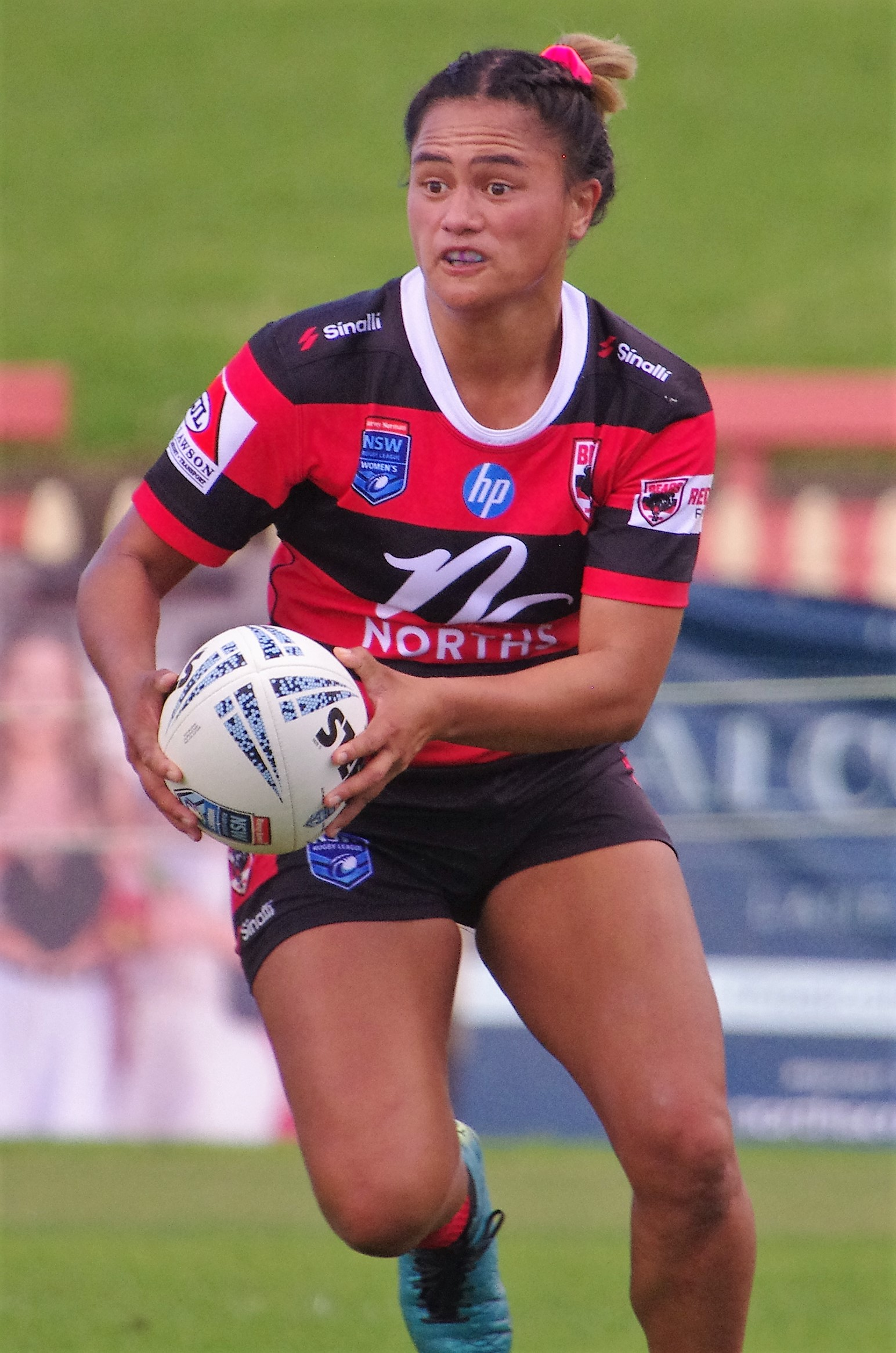
- Maynard in 2022

Personal information
- Born: 7 July 1992 (age 34) Gisborne, New Zealand
- Height: 157 cm (5 ft 2 in)
- Weight: 60 kg (9 st 6 lb)

Playing information

Rugby union
- Position: Scrum-half
Representative
Years	Team	Pld	T	G	FG	P
2014	Australia	6	0	0	0	0
2016	Australia 7s

Rugby league
- Position: Hooker
Club
Years	Team	Pld	T	G	FG	P
2018–20	Sydney Roosters	11	1	0	0	4
2021	Parramatta Eels	4	0	0	0	0
2022	Brisbane Broncos	3	0	0	0	0
2023–24	Newcastle Knights	19	0	0	0	0
2025–	St George Illawarra Dragons	12	0	0	0	0
	Total	49	1	0	0	4
Representative
Years	Team	Pld	T	G	FG	P
2017–22	New Zealand	13	3	0	0	12
2018	New South Wales	1	0	0	0	0
2019	New Zealand 9s	4	2	0	0	8
2021	Māori All Stars	1	0	0	0	0
- Source: As of 31 October 2026

Nita Maynard-Perrin (born 7 July 1992) is a New Zealand professional rugby league footballer for the St George Illawarra Dragons in the NRLW.

Primarily a hooker, she is a New Zealand and New South Wales representative. Before switching to rugby league, she represented Australia in rugby union and rugby sevens. She previously played for the Sydney Roosters, Parramatta Eels, Brisbane Broncos and Newcastle Knights in the NRL Women's Premiership.

== Background ==
Born in Gisborne, New Zealand, Maynard moved to Australia in 2011.

== Playing career ==
=== Rugby union ===
In 2014, she represented the Australian Wallaroos and in 2016, represented the Australia 7s team. She played for the Parramatta Two Blues before switching to rugby league in 2017.

=== Rugby league ===
In 2017, Maynard joined the Cronulla-Sutherland Sharks team in the NSWRL Women's Premiership. In October 2017, she was selected in the New Zealand 2017 Women's Rugby League World Cup squad. On 2 December 2017, she came off the bench in New Zealand's 16–23 final loss to Australia.

In May 2018, she represented NSW City at the Women's National Championships. On 22 June 2018, she represented New South Wales in their 16–10 win over Queensland. This would be Maynard's lone appearance for the Blues, as in April 2019, revised eligibility laws were introduced which ruled her ineligible to represent New South Wales.

On 16 June 2018, she signed with the Sydney Roosters NRL Women's Premiership team. In Round 1 of the 2018 NRL Women's season, she made her debut for the Roosters in their 4–10 loss to the New Zealand Warriors. On 30 September 2018, she started at hooker in the Roosters' 12–34 Grand Final loss to the Brisbane Broncos.

On 19 October 2019, Maynard scored the winning try for New Zealand in the final of the 2019 Rugby League World Cup 9s against Australia.

On 25 October 2020, she started at hooker in the Roosters' 20–10 NRLW Grand Final loss to the Broncos.

On 20 February 2021, she represented the Māori All Stars in their 24–0 win over the Indigenous All Stars.

In October 2022 she was selected for the New Zealand squad at the delayed 2021 Women's Rugby League World Cup in England.

In May 2023, she signed with the Newcastle Knights. In round 1 of the 2023 NRLW season, she made her Knights debut against the St. George Illawarra Dragons.

In October 2023, Maynard played off the bench in the Knights' 24-18 Grand Final win over the Gold Coast Titans.

After 19 games with the Knights, Maynard parted ways with the club at the end of the 2024 season.

In May 2025, Maynard-Perrin signed a two year deal with the St George Illawarra Dragons. Maynard-Perrin went on to play eight games in her debut season in the Red V.
