= Elianna Walton =

Australia, Cook Islands & Samoa international rugby league footballer (born 1984)

Personal information
- Born: 18 December 1984 (age 41) Auckland, New Zealand
- Height: 170 cm (5 ft 7 in)
- Weight: 101 kg (15 st 13 lb)

Playing information
- Position: Prop
Club
Years	Team	Pld	T	G	FG	P
2018	Sydney Roosters	4	0	0	0	0
Representative
Years	Team	Pld	T	G	FG	P
2009–18	New South Wales	10	0	0	0	0
2009–18	Australia
2014–17	Women's All Stars	2	0	0	0	0
2019	Samoa	1	0	0	0	0
2022	Cook Islands	2	0	0	0	0
- Source: RLP As of 15 November 2022

Elianna Walton (née Wilson; born 18 December 1984) is an Australian rugby league footballer who plays as a prop for Mounties RLFC in the NSWRL Women's Premiership.

She previously played for the Sydney Roosters in the NRL Women's Premiership and is an Australian, Samoan and New South Wales representative.

== Background ==
Walton was born in Auckland and moved to Australia when she was 15 to attend Wavell State High School in Brisbane. She began playing rugby league as a 15-year old, playing alongside her mother for Brothers Holy Spirit in the Brisbane open women's competition.

Her younger sisters, Stephanie and Eliza, represented the Cook Islands at the 2017 Women's Rugby League World Cup.

== Playing career ==
In 2008, Walton played for the Canterbury-Bankstown Bulldogs in the Sydney Metropolitan Competition.

In 2009, she made her representative debuts for Australia and New South Wales.

In 2013, while playing for Canley Heights, she was a member of Australia's Women's Rugby League World Cup-winning squad. On 2 December 2017, she came off the bench and scored a try in Australia's World Cup final win over New Zealand at Suncorp Stadium.

In June 2018, Walton was announced as one of fifteen marquee signings by the Sydney Roosters NRL Women's Premiership squad. In Round 1 of the 2018 NRL Women's season, she made her debut for the Roosters in a 4–10 loss to the New Zealand Warriors. On 30 September 2018, she started at prop in the Roosters 12–34 Grand Final loss to the Brisbane Broncos.

On 22 June 2019, Walton captained Samoa in their 8–46 loss to New Zealand in Auckland.
