= Amber Kani =

NZ women's international rugby league footballer

Personal information
- Born: 17 January 1991 (age 35) Auckland, New Zealand
- Height: 165 cm (5 ft 5 in)
- Weight: 73 kg (11 st 7 lb)

Playing information
- Position: Centre, Wing, Lock
Club
Years	Team	Pld	T	G	FG	P
2018–19	New Zealand Warriors	2	0	0	0	0
2022	Manurewa Marlins		1	0	0	4
2024–25	Papakura Sea Eagles		9	0	0	36
2026	Manurewa Marlins	16	9	0	0	36
	Total	18	19	0	0	76
Representative
Years	Team	Pld	T	G	FG	P
2016–18	New Zealand	6	3	0	0	12
2019–20	Māori All Stars	2	0	0	0	0
2022	Counties Manukau Stingrays	2	1	0	0	4
- Source: RLP As of 20 October 2020

Amber Kani (born 17 January 1991) is a New Zealand rugby league footballer who played for the New Zealand Warriors in the NRL Women's Premiership.

A centre or wing, she has represented New Zealand and the Māori All Stars.

== Playing career ==
A Papakura Sisters junior, Kani has played for the Manurewa Marlins, Papatoetoe Panthers, Otara Scorpions and Papakura Sea Eagles in the Auckland Rugby League.

In 2012, she was named in the New Zealand Test train-on squad but they did not play a game that season. On 6 May 2016, Kani made her debut for New Zealand in their 26–16 Anzac Test win over Australia.

In 2017, she represented the Kiwi Ferns at the 2017 Women's Rugby League World Cup. She played all five matches for New Zealand, coming off the bench in their Final loss to Australia.

On 1 August 2018, Kani was named as a member of the New Zealand Warriors inaugural NRL Women's Premiership squad. In Round 2 of the 2018 NRL Women's season, she made her debut for the Warriors in a 10–22 loss to the St George Illawarra Dragons.

On 15 February 2019, she started at centre for the Māori All Stars in their 8–4 win over the Indigenous All Stars.
