= Shontelle Woodman =

New Zealand international rugby league footballer

Personal information
- Born: 2 September 1986 (age 38); New Plymouth, New Zealand
- Height: 158 cm (5 ft 2 in)
- Weight: 68 kg (10 st 10 lb)

Playing information
- Position: Centre, Wing
Club
Years	Team	Pld	T	G	FG	P
2018	New Zealand Warriors	2	0	0	0	0
Representative
Years	Team	Pld	T	G	FG	P
2014–17	New Zealand	6	4	0	0	24
- Source: RLP As of 29 November 2020
- Relatives: Sharnita Woodman (sister)

Shontelle Woodman (born 2 September 1986) is a New Zealand rugby league footballer who played as a centre for the New Zealand Warriors in the NRL Women's Premiership.

== Playing career ==
In 2011, while playing for Papakura, Woodman was named the Auckland Rugby League Player of the Year.

In 2014, Woodman made her Test debut for New Zealand, playing alongside her twin sister Sharnita, in a 12–8 win over Australia.

On 3 May 2015, Woodman started on the wing and scored a try for New Zealand in their 14–22 loss to Australia at Suncorp Stadium.

On 2 December 2017, Woodman started at centre in New Zealand's 2017 Women's Rugby League World Cup final loss to Australia. She scored three tries in the tournament.

On 31 July 2018, Woodman was named in the New Zealand Warriors NRL Women's Premiership squad. In Round 1 of the 2018 NRL Women's season, she made her debut for the Warriors in a 10–4 win over the Sydney Roosters.
