= Teuila Fotu-Moala =

New Zealand international rugby league footballer

Personal information
- Born: 23 November 1993 (age 32) Auckland, New Zealand
- Height: 174 cm (5 ft 9 in)
- Weight: 94 kg (14 st 11 lb)

Playing information
- Position: Second-row, Prop
Club
Years	Team	Pld	T	G	FG	P
2013	Otahuhu Leopards
2018	Brisbane Broncos	4	1	0	0	4
2019	St George Illawarra	1	0	0	0	0
2022	Manurewa Marlins
	Total	5	1	0	0	4
Representative
Years	Team	Pld	T	G	FG	P
2014–19	New Zealand	11	4	0	0	16
2019	New Zealand 9s	2	0	0	0	0
2022	Counties Manukau Stingrays	2	1	0	0	4
- Source: RLP As of 13 October 2020

Teuila Fotu-Moala (born 29 November 1993) is a New Zealand rugby league footballer who played for the Brisbane Broncos and St George Illawarra Dragons in the NRL Women's Premiership.

Primarily a second-rower, she is a New Zealand representative and won a premiership with the Broncos in 2018.

== Background ==
Born in Auckland, Fotu-Moala first played rugby league at McAuley High School.

== Playing career ==
In 2013, Fotu-Moala joined Otahuhu Leopards, later becoming the captain-coach of the side.

On 9 November 2014, she made her Test debut for New Zealand in a 12–8 win over Australia, scoring the winning try in the 79th minute. On 3 February 2016, she was named the NZRL Women's Player of the Year for 2015.

On 2 December 2017, she started at second-row in New Zealand's World Cup Final loss to Australia. Before the final, she won the Player of the Tournament award.

=== 2018 ===
In June, Fotu-Moala, along with Ali Brigginshaw, Brittany Breayley, Heather Ballinger and Caitlyn Moran, were named as the five marquee players for the Brisbane Broncos women's team.

In Round 1 of the 2018 NRL Women's season, Fotu-Moala made her debut in the Broncos' 30–4 win over the St George Illawarra Dragons. On 30 September, she started at second-row in the Broncos' 34–12 Grand Final win over the Sydney Roosters.

=== 2019 ===
In March, Fotu-Moala moved to Australia, joining the North Sydney Bears in the NSWRL Women's Premiership. In July, she signed with the St George Illawarra Dragons.

In Round 1 of the 2019 NRL Women's season, Fotu-Moala was charged with a crusher tackle in a 4–14 loss to the Broncos. She became the first NRLW player to be charged by the match review committee and was suspended for three games, ruling her out for the rest of the season.

In October, she was a member of New Zealand's 2019 Rugby League World Cup 9s-winning squad.

=== 2020 ===
On 21 January, she was named at second-row in NRL.com's women's Team of the Decade.

== Achievements and accolades ==
=== Team ===
- 2018 NRLW Grand Final: Brisbane Broncos – Winners
