= Lilieta Maumau =

New Zealand & Tonga women's international rugby league footballer

Personal information
- Born: 31 May 1992 (age 33) Auckland, New Zealand
- Height: 1.75 m (5 ft 9 in)
- Weight: 90 kg (200 lb; 14 st 2 lb)

Playing information
- Position: Prop
Representative
Years	Team	Pld	T	G	FG	P
2014	New Zealand	8	4	0	0	16
2020	Tonga	1	1	0	0	4
- As of 24 May 2026

Lilieta Maumau is both a New Zealand and Tonga international rugby league player. She made her debut in the 2014 Test Match against the Australia. Maumau participated in the 2016 NRL Auckland Nines She represented the Kiwi Ferns at the 2017 Women's Rugby League World Cup.
