= Caitlin Moran (rugby league) =

Australia international rugby league footballer

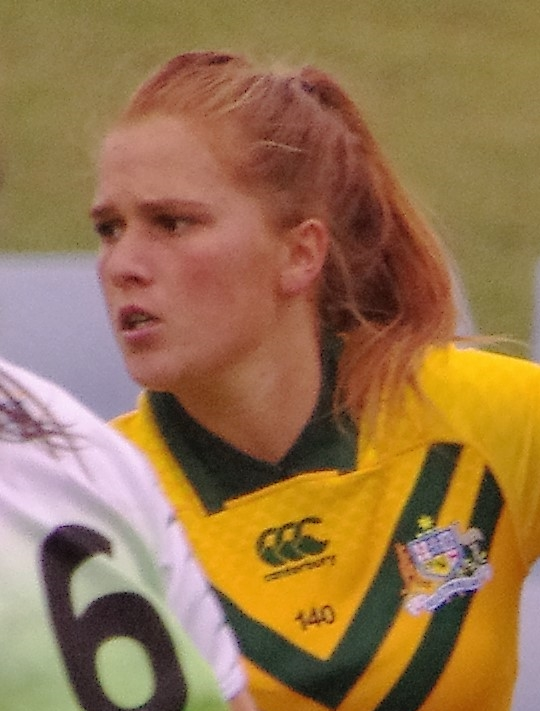
- Moran in 2017

Personal information
- Born: 20 November 1996 (age 29) Muswellbrook, New South Wales, Australia
- Height: 159 cm (5 ft 3 in)
- Weight: 63 kg (9 st 13 lb)

Playing information
- Position: Halfback
Club
Years	Team	Pld	T	G	FG	P
2022–23	Newcastle Knights	7	0	0	0	0
Representative
Years	Team	Pld	T	G	FG	P
2016–17	Australia	6	4	17	1	51
2016–17	New South Wales	2	0	0	0	0
2013–17	Indigenous All Stars	5	0	0	0	0
- Source: As of 3 August 2023

Caitlin Moran (born 20 November 1996) is an Australian professional rugby league footballer. She previously played for the Newcastle Knights in the NRL Women's Premiership. Her position is halfback. She has represented Australia at international level.

== Playing career ==
Moran was a member of the winning Australia women's national rugby league team squad for the 2017 Women's Rugby League World Cup. She went on to play a pivotal role, including kicking a decisive field goal in the final.

In June 2018, Moran, along with Ali Brigginshaw, Brittany Breayley, Heather Ballinger and Teuila Fotu-Moala, were named as the five marquee players for the Brisbane Broncos women's team which commenced playing in the NRL Women's Premiership in September. However, in the previous month, Moran suffered an anterior cruciate ligament injury which ruled her out of the inaugural NRL Women's season. This meant she missed being part of the club's premiership win.

In June 2022, Moran signed with the Newcastle Knights for the 2022 season. In round 3 of the 2022 season, she made her NRLW debut for the Knights against the Parramatta Eels.

On 2 October 2022, Moran played in the Knights' 32-12 NRLW Grand Final win over the Parramatta Eels.

After the 2023 season, Moran parted ways with the Knights.

== Controversies ==
In 2022, Moran was suspended for one match and fined by the National Rugby League for derogatory comments she made on Instagram about Queen Elizabeth II on the date of her death.
