= Atawhai Tupaea =

New Zealand rugby league footballer

Personal information
- Full name: Atawhai Message
- Born: 3 February 1989 (age 36) Papakura, Auckland, New Zealand
- Height: 166 cm (5 ft 5 in)
- Weight: 77 kg (12 st 2 lb)

Playing information
- Position: Centre, Wing, Fullback
Representative
Years	Team	Pld	T	G	FG	P
2014–19	New Zealand	10	6	0	0	24
2017–19	New Zealand 9s	4	1	0	0	4
- Source: RLP As of 28 November 2020

Atawhai Tupaea (born 3 February 1989) is a New Zealand rugby league footballer who played as a centre for the New Zealand Warriors in the NRL Women's Premiership.

She is a New Zealand representative.

== Background ==
Born in Papakura, Auckland, Tupaea represented New Zealand in tag, rugby, touch football before switching to rugby league.

== Playing career ==
In 2014, Tupaea began playing for the Papakura Sisters and represented Counties Manukau. On 9 November 2014, she made her Test debut for New Zealand, scoring a try in their 12–8 win over Australia at WIN Stadium. On 28 January 2015, she was named the NZRL Women's Player of the Year.

On 6 May 2016, she started on the wing and scored two tries for New Zealand in their 26–16 win over Australia.

In 2017, she played all five games for New Zealand at the 2017 Women's Rugby League World Cup, including starting on the wing in their 16–23 final loss to Australia.

In 2019, Tupaea returned to rugby league after a year off and was signed by the New Zealand Warriors NRL Women's Premiership team. In Round 1 of the 2019 NRL Women's season, she made her debut for the Warriors, starting at centre and scoring a try in their 16–12 win over the Sydney Roosters.

In October 2019, she joined New Zealand's 2019 Rugby League World Cup 9s-winning squad.

Atawhai is a proud mum of two and wife

== Achievements and accolades ==
=== Individual ===
- RLPA New Zealand Women's Player of the Year: 2015

=== Team ===
- 2019 Rugby League World Cup 9s: New Zealand – Winners
