= Ali Brigginshaw =

Australia international rugby league footballer (born 1989)

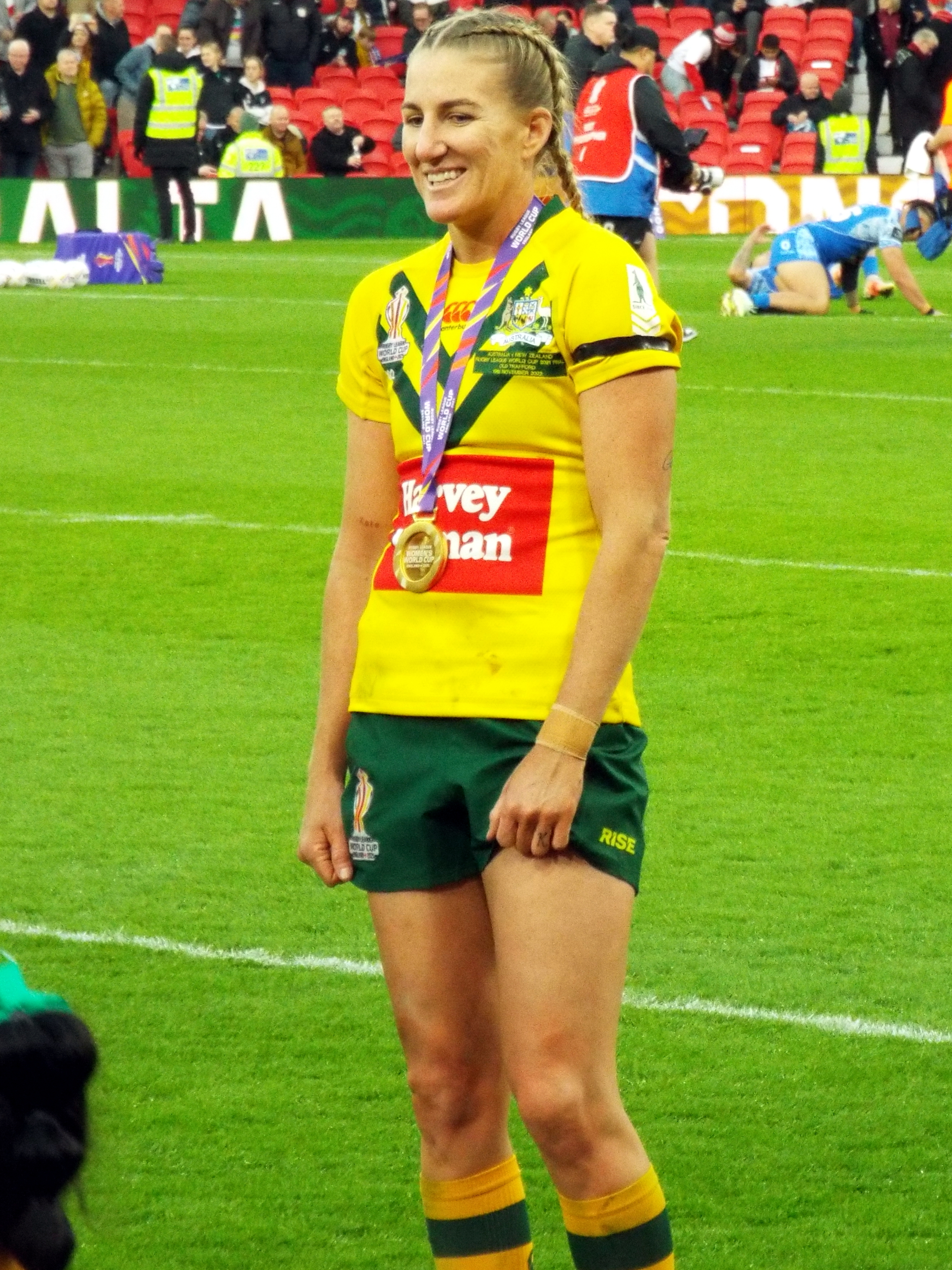

Personal information
- Born: 1 December 1989 (age 36) Ipswich, Queensland, Australia

Playing information
- Height: 178 cm (5 ft 10 in)
- Weight: 68 kg (10 st 10 lb)
- Position: Halfback, Five-eighth, Lock
Club
Years	Team	Pld	T	G	FG	P
2018–26	Brisbane Broncos	60	14	35	0	118
Representative
Years	Team	Pld	T	G	FG	P
2009–25	Queensland	13	1	2	0	8
2009–25	Australia	29	7	19	0	66
2011–17	Women's All Stars	6	0	0	0	0
2019	Australia 9s	4	2	3	0	16

Ali Brigginshaw (born 1 December 1989) is an Australian former rugby league footballer who last played for the Brisbane Broncos in the NRL Women's Premiership and Valleys Diehards in the QRL Women's Premiership.

Primarily a halfback, she was the captain of the Broncos, Australia and Queensland.

== Background ==
Born in Ipswich, Queensland, Brigginshaw played her junior rugby league for the North Ipswich Tigers but was forced to give up the sport when she was twelve because there was no competition for older girls. Brigginshaw's father Larry was a halfback in the Brisbane Rugby League, captaining Eastern Suburbs to a premiership win in 1983.

== Playing career ==
In 2009, Brigginshaw returned to rugby league, playing for the Souths Logan Magpies. That year, she made her representative debuts for Australia and Queensland.

In 2013, Brigginshaw was a member of Australia's 2013 Women's Rugby League World Cup-winning squad, starting at five-eighth in the final against New Zealand.

In 2015, Brigginshaw broke her right fibula in three places. During her recovery she took up Muay Thai and boxing, becoming a national champion and the Australian Golden Gloves Novice A champion in the 69 kg category. In 2016, she returned from injury and played in Queensland 4–8 loss to New South Wales.

On 2 December 2017, she started at five-eighth and was named Player of the Match in Australia's 23–16 Women's World Cup final win over New Zealand.

=== 2018 ===
In May, she represented South East Queensland at the first ever Women's National Championships. In June, Brigginshaw, along with Brittany Breayley, Heather Ballinger, Teuila Fotu-Moala and Caitlyn Moran, were named as the five marquee players for the Brisbane Broncos NRL Women's Premiership team. In August, she was named captain of the side.

On 30 September, she captained the Broncos' in their 34–12 Grand Final win over the Sydney Roosters.

=== 2019 ===
In May, she once again represented South East Queensland at the Women's National Championships.

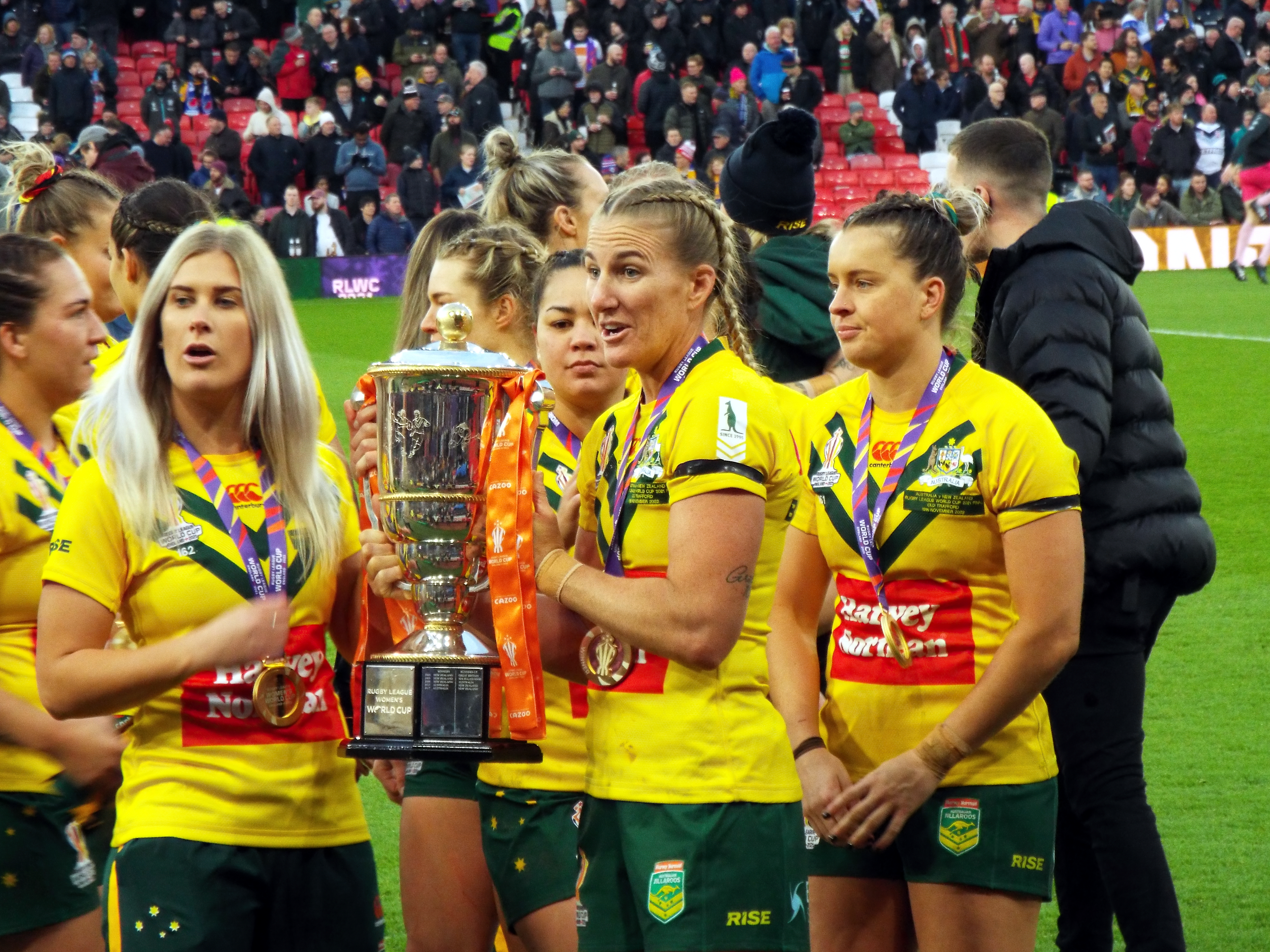
Ali Brigginshaw with the WRLWC 2021 trophy

On 6 October, she captained the Broncos to their second NRL Women's Premiership after they defeated the St George Illawarra Dragons 30–6 in the Grand Final.

=== 2020 ===
In 2020, Brigginshaw joined Ipswich Brothers for the inaugural season of the QRL Women's Premiership.

On 19 October, she won the Dally M Medal for female Player of the Year. On 25 October, she started at lock in the Broncos' 20–10 NRLW Grand Final win over the Roosters.

=== 2021 ===
In 2021, Brigginshaw joined Valleys Diehards in the QRL Women's Premiership.

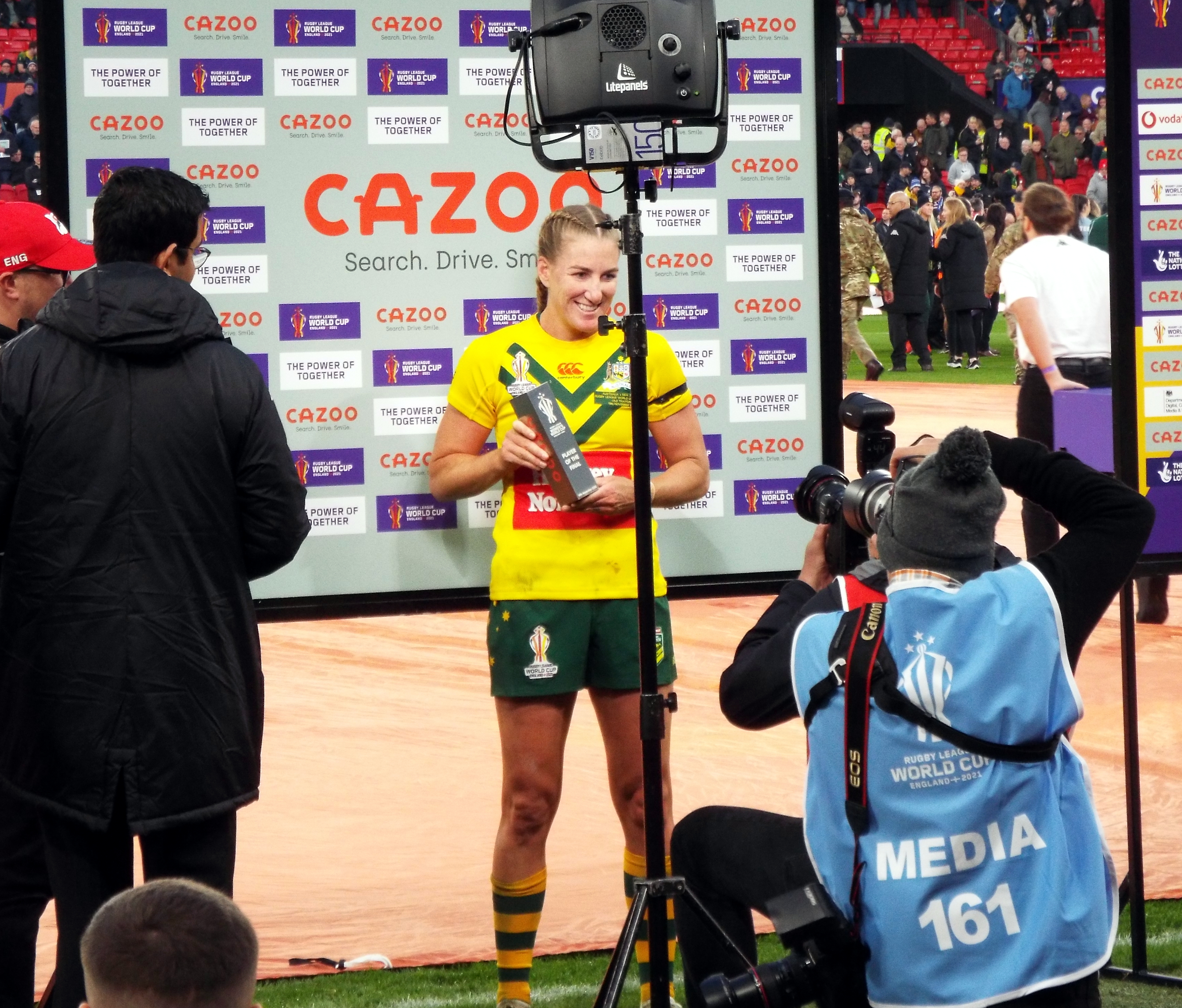
Ali Brigginshaw after winning the player of the match award in the WRLWC 2021 Final in 2022

== Achievements and accolades ==
=== Individual ===
- Dally M Medal: 2020
- Brisbane Broncos Player of the Year: 2019
- Brisbane Broncos Best Back: 2019

=== Team ===
- 2013 Women's Rugby League World Cup: Australia – Winners
- 2017 Women's Rugby League World Cup: Australia – Winners
- 2021 Women's Rugby League World Cup: Australia – Winners
- 2020 Women's State of Origin: Queensland – Winners
- 2021 Women's State of Origin: Queensland – Winners
- 2024 Women's State of Origin: Queensland – Winners
- 2018 NRLW Grand Final: Brisbane Broncos – Winners
- 2019 NRLW Grand Final: Brisbane Broncos – Winners
- 2020 NRLW Grand Final: Brisbane Broncos – Winners
- 2025 NRLW Grand Final: Brisbane Broncos – Winners

== Personal life ==
Brigginshaw proposed to her partner Kate Daly in December 2019 and the couple married a year later, on 30 December 2020.

In March 2026, Brigginshaw starred in the reality TV show Rivals: Sport vs. Sport representing "Team Rugby League". She was featured alongside Josh Addo-Carr, Jaime Chapman, and Reece Walsh.
