= Ruan Sims =

Australia dual-code international rugby footballer

Ruan Sims OAM
Personal information
- Born: 4 February 1982 (age 44) Sydney, New South Wales, Australia
- Height: 175 cm (5 ft 9 in)
- Weight: 88 kg (194 lb; 13 st 12 lb)

Playing information

Rugby league
- Position: Prop
Club
Years	Team	Pld	T	G	FG	P
2018–19	Sydney Roosters	6	1	0	0	4
Representative
Years	Team	Pld	T	G	FG	P
2012–17	New South Wales	5	0	0	0	0
2013–17	Australia	12	2	0	0	8
2013–17	Women's All Stars	5	0	0	0	0

Rugby union
- Position: Centre
Representative
Years	Team	Pld	T	G	FG	P
2006–10	Australia	9	4	0	0	20
- Source: RLP As of 17 November 2020
- Relatives: Ashton Sims (brother); Korbin Sims (brother); Tariq Sims (brother); Reagan Campbell-Gillard (cousin)

Ruan Sims OAM (born 4 February 1982) is an Australian former rugby league and rugby union footballer.

She played rugby union for Australia. She was a member of the Wallaroos squad at the 2006, and 2010 Rugby World Cup where they finished in third place. She played rugby league for Australia at the 2013 & 2017 Women's Rugby League World Cup and was part of the squad that won the tournament.

== Background ==
She is the older sister of Fijian rugby league internationals Ashton, Tariq and Korbin. She was brought up in a sporting household in Gerringong where Ruan held the gumboot throwing record in 2013. Sims inherits her interest in rugby from her mother, Jackie Sims. She works for Fire and Rescue NSW.

== Playing career ==
=== Rugby union ===
Sims was a member of the Australian squad at the 2006 Women's Rugby World Cup in Canada. She was the first Wallaroo to score four tries in a test match, she achieved the feat against South Africa in their opening match of the 2006 tournament.

In 2009, she scored twice for the Wallaroos in their Oceania qualifier for the 2010 World Cup against Samoa. Her side ran in 15 unanswered tries in the 87–0 trouncing of Samoa.

She made her last appearance for the side in their semi-final match against England at the 2010 Women's Rugby World Cup.

=== Rugby league ===
She was part of the Australian Jillaroos squad at the 2015 NRL Auckland Nines.

Sims was the first woman to receive a player contract in the NRL, signed with the Cronulla-Sutherland Sharks.

Since March 2017, Sims works with the ABC Radio Grandstand NRL commentary team, providing commentary both in-box and on the sideline. She is also a regular panellist on Nine Network's 100% Footy.

In April 2018, Sims stepped down as a Dally M Awards judge after casting votes for the Round 7 NRL game between Parrammatta and Manly at ANZ Stadium where she was not in attendance due to other commitments. Judges are required to attend their assigned games.

In June 2018, Sims was announced as one of fifteen marquee signings by the Sydney Roosters women's team which participated in the inaugural NRL Women's Premiership in September 2018.

Sims was awarded the Medal of the Order of Australia in the 2021 Queen's Birthday Honours list.
