= Brittany Breayley-Nati =

Australia international rugby league footballer (born 1991)

Personal information
- Born: Brittany Breayley; 7 February 1991 (age 35) Mackay, Queensland, Australia
- Height: 168 cm (5 ft 6 in)
- Weight: 72 kg (11 st 5 lb)

Playing information
- Position: Hooker
Club
Years	Team	Pld	T	G	FG	P
2018	Brisbane Broncos	4	1	0	0	4
2019–20	St George Illawarra	4	0	0	0	0
2021–	Gold Coast Titans	34	3	0	0	12
	Total	42	4	0	0	16
Representative
Years	Team	Pld	T	G	FG	P
2014–20	Queensland	7	0	0	0	0
2014–18	Australia	10	1	0	0	4
2015–17	Women's All Stars	3	0	0	0	0
- Source: RLP As of 1 November 2023
- Spouse: Kimiora Breayley-Nati

Brittany Breayley-Nati (née Breayley; born 7 February 1991) is an Australian rugby league footballer who plays for the Gold Coast Titans in the NRL Women's Premiership.

Primarily a hooker, she is a Queensland and Australian representative and played for the Brisbane Broncos and St George Illawarra Dragons in the NRL Women's Premiership.

== Background ==
Born in Mackay, Queensland, Breayley-Nati is of Māori descent and began playing rugby league for the Mackay Magpies in 2008.

== Playing career ==
In 2014, while playing for the North Ipswich Tigers, Breayley-Nati made her representative debuts for Australia and Queensland.

In 2017, she won the Queensland Women's Representative Player of the Year at the QRL Major Competition Awards. On 2 December 2017, she started at hooker in Australia's 2017 Women's Rugby League World Cup final win over New Zealand.

In June 2018, Breayley-Nati, along with Ali Brigginshaw, Heather Ballinger, Teuila Fotu-Moala and Caitlyn Moran, were named as the five marquee players for the Brisbane Broncos NRL Women's Premiership team.

In September 2018, she was named Female Player of the Year at the 2018 Dally M awards. On 30 September 2018, she started at hooker in the Broncos' 34–12 Grand Final win over the Sydney Roosters.

In 2019, Breayley-Nati joined the St George Illawarra Dragons. On 6 October 2019, she started at hooker in the Dragons' 6–30 Grand Final loss to the Broncos.

In February 2020, she was member of the Dragons' NRL Nines winning squad. Breayley sat out the 2020 NRL Women's season due to family and work commitments. On 13 November 2020, she started at hooker in Queensland's 24–18 win over New South Wales at Sunshine Coast Stadium.

== Achievements and accolades ==
=== Individual ===
- QRL Representative Player of the Year: 2016, 2017
- Dally M Medal: 2018
- Brisbane Broncos Player of the Year: 2018
- Brisbane Broncos Best Forward: 2018

=== Team ===
- 2017 Women's Rugby League World Cup: Australia – Winners
- 2018 NRLW Grand Final: Brisbane Broncos – Winners
