= Laura Mariu =

New Zealand & Canada international rugby league footballer

Laura Mariu MNZM
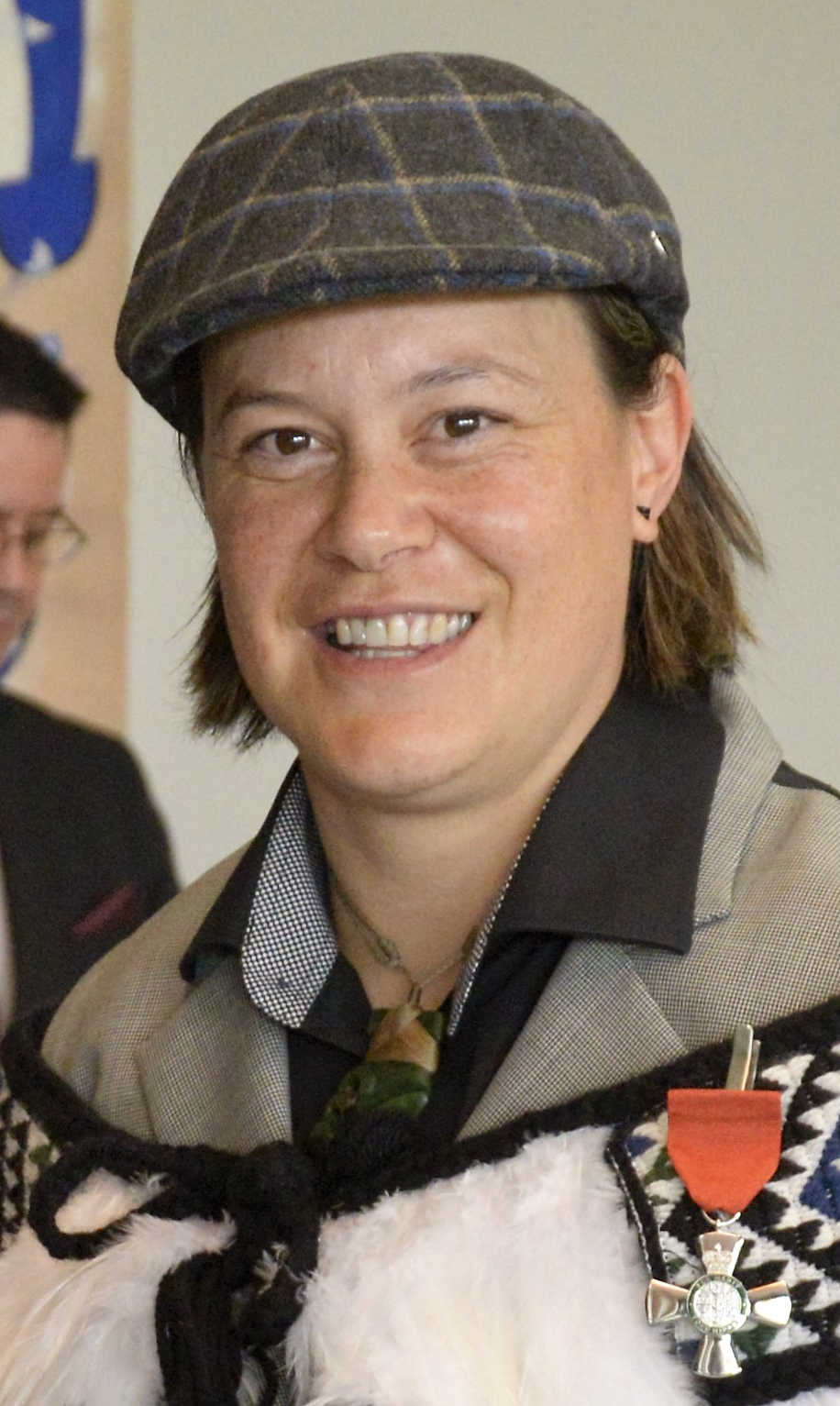
- Mariu in 2018
- Born: Laura Tui Mariu; 2 December 1980 (age 45); Auckland, New Zealand
- Rugby league career

Personal information
- Height: 1.71 m (5 ft 7 1/2 in)
- Weight: 85 kg (187 lb; 13 st 5 lb)

Playing information
Club
Years	Team	Pld	T	G	FG	P
2018	New Zealand Warriors	3	0	0	0	0
Representative
Years	Team	Pld	T	G	FG	P
2000–18	New Zealand	24	9	25	0	86
2022	Canada	4	0	0	0	0

Laura Tui Mariu MNZM (born 2 December 1980) is a Canadian international rugby league player. She represented New Zealand at the 2000, 2003, 2008, 2013 and 2017 Women's Rugby League World Cups.

Mariu was chosen to captain the New Zealand Warriors' Women's team in the inaugural NRLW competition in 2018.

In the 2018 Queen's Birthday Honours, Mariu was appointed a Member of the New Zealand Order of Merit, for services to rugby league.

Mariu will represent Canada Ravens in the 2021 Rugby League World Cup. She is eligible through her Canadian mother.
