= 2018 NRL Women's season results =

The 2018 NRL Women's Premiership is the first season of professional women's rugby league in Australia.

== Round 1 ==
8 September 2018
3:05pm

Sydney Roosters	4 – 10	New Zealand Warriors
Tries: Isabelle Kelly (26') 1 Goals: Maddie Studdon 0/1	1st: 4 – 10; 2nd: 0 – 0 Report	Tries: 1 (8') Hilda Mariu; 1 (17') Luisa Gago; Goals: 1/2 Apii Nicholls (18')

ANZ Stadium, Sydney
Attendance: 7,748
Referee: Jon Stone, Joshua McGowan

Team lists:

FB	1	Botille Vette-Welsh
WG	2	Karina Brown
CE	3	Shontelle Stowers
CE	4	Isabelle Kelly
WG	5	Taleena Simon
FE	6	Lavina O'Mealey
HB	7	Maddie Studdon
PR	8	Simaima Taufa (c)
HK	9	Kylie Hilder
PR	10	Elianna Walton
SR	11	Tazmin Grey
SR	12	Vanessa Foliaki
LK	13	Zahara Temara
Substitutes:
IC	14	Nita Maynard
IC	15	Sarah Togatuki
IC	16	Chloe Caldwell
IC	17	Victoria Latu
Coach: Adam Hartigan

FB	1	Apii Nicholls
WG	2	Langi Veainu
CE	3	Shontelle Woodman
CE	14	Sarina Clark
WG	5	Hilda Mariu
FE	6	Laura Mariu (c)
HB	7	Georgia Hale
PR	8	Annetta Nuuausala
HK	9	Krystal Rota
PR	10	Aieshaleigh Smalley
SR	4	Onjeurlina Leiataua
SR	12	Alice Vailea
LK	13	Luisa Gago
Substitutes:
IC	11	Tanika-Jazz Noble-Bell
IC	15	Lorina Papali'i
IC	17	Kahurangi Peters
IC	18	Sui Tauaua-Pauaraisa
Coach: Luisa Avaiki

9 September 2018
1:45pm

Brisbane Broncos	30 – 4	St George Illawarra Dragons
Tries: Chelsea Baker (2', 28') 2 Maitua Feterika (23') 1 Ngatokotoru Arakua (31') 1 Ali Brigginshaw (52') 1 Goals: Chelsea Baker 5/6 (24', 30', 30', 32', 53')	1st: 18 – 4; 2nd: 12 – 0 Report	Tries: 1 (7') Sam Bremner; Goals: 0/1 Shakiah Tungai

Suncorp Stadium, Brisbane
Attendance: 18,853
Referee: Matt Noyen, Kasey Badger

Team lists:

FB	1	Chelsea Baker
WG	2	Julia Robinson
CE	3	Amelia Kuk
CE	4	Amber Pilley
WG	5	Meg Ward
FE	6	Kimiora Nati
HB	7	Ali Brigginshaw (c)
PR	8	Heather Ballinger
HK	9	Brittany Breayley
PR	10	Steph Hancock
SR	11	Teuila Fotu-Moala
SR	12	Maitua Feterika
LK	13	Rona Peters
Substitutes:
IC	14	Lavinia Gould
IC	15	Chelsea Lenarduzzi
IC	16	Mariah Storch
IC	17	Ngatokotoru Arakua
Coach: Paul Dyer

FB	1	Sam Bremner (c)
WG	2	Rikeya Horne
CE	3	Jessica Sergis
CE	4	Honey Hireme
WG	5	Shakiah Tungai
FE	17	Melanie Howard
HB	7	Raecene McGregor
PR	16	Teina Clark
HK	9	Anneka Stephens
PR	10	Asoiva Karpani
SR	11	Kezie Apps
SR	14	Holli Wheeler
LK	13	Annette Brander
Substitutes:
IC	6	Keeley Davis
IC	8	Oneata Schwalger
IC	15	Hannah Southwell
IC	18	Asipau Mafi
Coach: Daniel Lacey

== Round 2 ==
14 September 2018
5:15pm

Sydney Roosters	4 – 14	Brisbane Broncos
Tries: Isabelle Kelly (57') 1 Goals: Maddie Studdon 0/1	1st: 0 – 10; 2nd: 4 – 4 Report	Tries: 1 (21') Ali Brigginshaw; 1 (26') Teuila Fotu-Moala; 1 (37') Meg Ward; Goals: 1/3 Chelsea Baker (27')

Allianz Stadium, Sydney
Attendance: 4,000
Referee: Peter Gough, Joshua McGowan

Team lists:

FB	1	Karina Brown
WG	2	Sharon McGrady
CE	3	Shontelle Stowers
CE	4	Isabelle Kelly
WG	5	Taleena Simon
FE	6	Lavina O'Mealey
HB	7	Maddie Studdon
PR	8	Ruan Sims
HK	9	Kylie Hilder
PR	10	Elianna Walton
SR	11	Tazmin Grey
SR	12	Vanessa Foliaki
LK	13	Zahara Temara
Substitutes:
IC	14	Nita Maynard
IC	16	Chloe Caldwell
IC	17	Victoria Latu
IC	21	Simaima Taufa (c)
Coach: Adam Hartigan

FB	1	Chelsea Baker
WG	2	Julia Robinson
CE	3	Meg Ward
CE	4	Amber Pilley
WG	5	Karley Te Kawa
FE	6	Kimiora Nati
HB	7	Ali Brigginshaw (c)
PR	8	Heather Ballinger
HK	9	Brittany Breayley
PR	15	Chelsea Lenarduzzi
SR	11	Teuila Fotu-Moala
SR	12	Maitua Feterika
LK	13	Rona Peters
Substitutes:
IC	10	Steph Hancock
IC	14	Lavinia Gould
IC	16	Mariah Storch
IC	17	Ngatokotoru Arakua
Coach: Paul Dyer

15 September 2018
5:10pm

St George Illawarra Dragons	22 – 10	New Zealand Warriors
Tries: Shakiah Tungai (2') 1 Honey Hireme (5') 1 Rikeya Horne (37') 1 Jessica Sergis (46') 1 Goals: Shakiah Tungai 3/4 (4', 6', 38')	1st: 12 – 0; 2nd: 10 – 10; Report	Tries: 1 (41') Raquel Anderson-Pitman; 1 (56') Sarina Clark; Goals: 1/2 Apii Nicholls (42')

ANZ Stadium, Sydney
Attendance: 16,274
Referee: Matt Noyen, Wyatt Raymond

Team lists:

FB	4	Honey Hireme
WG	2	Rikeya Horne
CE	3	Jessica Sergis
CE	15	Hannah Southwell
WG	5	Shakiah Tungai
FE	6	Keeley Davis
HB	7	Raecene McGregor
PR	8	Oneata Schwalger
HK	9	Anneka Stephens
PR	14	Holli Wheeler
SR	11	Kezie Apps (c)
SR	12	Talesha Quinn
LK	13	Annette Brander
Substitutes:
IC	16	Teina Clark
IC	17	Melanie Howard
IC	18	Asipau Mafi
IC	19	Kate Haren
Coach: Daniel Lacey

FB	1	Apii Nicholls
WG	5	Hilda Mariu
CE	14	Sarina Clark
CE	2	Langi Veainu
WG	21	Lisa Edwards
FE	6	Laura Mariu (c)
HB	7	Georgia Hale
PR	8	Crystal Tamarua
HK	9	Krystal Rota
PR	10	Aieshaleigh Smalley
SR	4	Onjeurlina Leiataua
SR	12	Alice Vailea
LK	18	Sui Tauaua-Pauaraisa
Substitutes:
IC	13	Luisa Gago
IC	15	Lorina Papali'i
IC	16	Amber Kani
IC	20	Raquel Anderson-Pitman
Coach: Luisa Avaiki

== Round 3 ==
21 September 2018
5:15pm

Brisbane Broncos	32 – 10	New Zealand Warriors
Tries: Julia Robinson (11', 45') 2 Rona Peters (8') 1 Karley Te Kawa (19') 1 Brittany Breayley (30') 1 Kody House (39') 1 Goals: Chelsea Baker 4/6 (9', 21', 32', 40')	1st: 16 – 10; 2nd: 16 – 0 Report	Tries: 1 (4') Aieshaleigh Smalley; 1 (15') Georgia Hale; Goals: 1/2 Apii Nicholls (5')

AAMI Park, Melbourne
Referee: Peter Gough, Jake Sutherland

Team lists:

FB	1	Chelsea Baker
WG	2	Julia Robinson
CE	3	Kody House
CE	4	Amber Pilley
WG	5	Karley Te Kawa
FE	6	Kimiora Nati
HB	7	Ali Brigginshaw (c)
PR	8	Heather Ballinger
HK	9	Brittany Breayley
PR	10	Steph Hancock
SR	11	Teuila Fotu-Moala
SR	12	Maitua Feterika
LK	13	Rona Peters
Substitutes:
IC	14	Lavinia Gould
IC	15	Chelsea Lenarduzzi
IC	16	Tallisha Harden
IC	17	Ngatokotoru Arakua
Coach: Paul Dyer

FB	1	Apii Nicholls
WG	2	Langi Veainu
CE	3	Shontelle Woodman
CE	14	Sarina Clark
WG	5	Hilda Mariu
FE	6	Laura Mariu (c)
HB	7	Georgia Hale
PR	11	Tanika-Jazz Noble-Bell
HK	9	Krystal Rota
PR	10	Aieshaleigh Smalley
SR	4	Onjeurlina Leiataua
SR	12	Alice Vailea
LK	13	Luisa Gago
Substitutes:
IC	15	Lorina Papali'i
IC	18	Sui Tauaua-Pauaraisa
IC	20	Raquel Anderson-Pitman
IC	24	Va'nessa Molia-Fraser
Coach: Luisa Avaiki

22 September 2018
5:10pm

Sydney Roosters	26 – 0	St George Illawarra Dragons
Tries: Taleena Simon (4', 8', 11', 33') 4 Brydie Parker (45') 1 Victoria Latu (57') 1 Goals: Zahara Temara 1/6 (57')	1st: 12 – 0; 2nd: 14 – 0 Report

Allianz Stadium, Sydney
Referee: Jon Stone, Kasey Badger

Team lists:

FB	1	Karina Brown
WG	2	Brydie Parker
CE	3	Shontelle Stowers
CE	4	Isabelle Kelly
WG	5	Taleena Simon
FE	6	Lavia O'Mealey
HB	7	Zahara Temara
PR	8	Ruan Sims
HK	9	Nita Maynard
PR	10	Elianna Walton
SR	11	Tazmin Grey
SR	12	Vanessa Foliaki
LK	13	Simaima Taufa (c)
Substitutes:
IC	15	Sarah Togatuki
IC	17	Victoria Latu
IC	19	Kandy Kennedy
IC	21	Kylie Hilder
Coach: Adam Hartigan

FB	4	Honey Hireme
WG	2	Rikeya Horne
CE	3	Jessica Sergis
CE	15	Hannah Southwell
WG	5	Shakiah Tungai
FE	6	Keeley Davis
HB	7	Raecene McGregor
PR	16	Asipau Mafi
HK	9	Anneka Stephens
PR	14	Holli Wheeler
SR	11	Kezie Apps (c)
SR	12	Talesha Quinn
LK	13	Annette Brander
Substitutes:
IC	8	Oneata Schwalger
IC	16	Teina Clark
IC	17	Melanie Howard
IC	19	Kate Haren
Coach: Daniel Lacey

== Grand Final ==
Sunday, 30 September
1:35pm

Brisbane Broncos	34 – 12	Sydney Roosters
Tries: Kimiora Nati (5', 17', 45') 3 Heather Ballinger (13') 1 Ngatokotoru Arakua (24') 1 Lavinia Gould (28') 1 Goals: Chelsea Baker 5/6 (6', 15', 18', 25', 47')	1st: 28 – 6; 2nd: 6 – 6 Report	Tries: 1 (10') Tazmin Grey; 1 (43') Lavina O'Mealey; Goals: 2/3 Zahara Temara (4', 44')

ANZ Stadium
Attendance: 16,214
Karyn Murphy Medallist: Kimiora Nati (Brisbane)
Referee: Jon Stone, Kasey Badger

Team lists:

FB	1	Chelsea Baker
WG	2	Julia Robinson
CE	3	Meg Ward
CE	4	Amber Pilley
WG	5	Amelia Kuk
FE	6	Kimiora Nati
HB	7	Ali Brigginshaw (c)
PR	8	Heather Ballinger
HK	9	Brittany Breayley
PR	15	Chelsea Lenarduzzi
SR	11	Teuila Fotu-Moala
SR	12	Maitua Feterika
LK	13	Rona Peters
Substitutes:
IC	10	Steph Hancock
IC	14	Lavinia Gould
IC	16	Mariah Storch
IC	17	Ngatokotoru Arakua
Coach: Paul Dyer

FB	1	Karina Brown
WG	2	Brydie Parker
CE	3	Shontelle Stowers
CE	4	Isabelle Kelly
WG	5	Taleena Simon
FE	6	Lavina O'Mealey
HB	7	Zahara Temara
PR	8	Ruan Sims
HK	9	Nita Maynard
PR	10	Elianna Walton
SR	11	Tazmin Grey
SR	12	Vanessa Foliaki
LK	13	Simaima Taufa (c)
Substitutes:
IC	14	Kylie Hilder
IC	15	Sarah Togatuki
IC	16	Victoria Latu
IC	17	Kandy Kennedy
Coach: Adam Hartigan
