= 2018 NRL Women's season squads =

Australian rugby league players

The 2018 NRL Women's Premiership comprised 4 competing teams. Starting squad size was 22 players. Contracts were for the short pre-season and four-week season.

Requests to replace players injured during the pre-season could be sought from the administrative body, the National Rugby League. The Brisbane Broncos sought and obtained such approval when an early signing, Caitlin Moran ruptured her ACL.

The four clubs in total used 82 players. Each club used between 19 and 22 players. Six contracted players went unused. As this was the inaugural season of the NRLW, all 82 players made their NRLW debut. Fifty-one of the 82 players had previously played in women's international matches: 27 for New Zealand, 23 for Australia and one player, Amelia Kuk, for Papua New Guinea. A further eight players had played for NSW (3) or Queensland (5) but at the time had not played in a full international match.

During the season, 41 tries were scored by 31 individual players. So, 37.80% of players scored at least one try. A tally of 24 goals were kicked by 4 players, with each of the four teams having a single successful goalkicker. No field-goals were kicked during the season.

== Key ==
- Age is at 8 September 2018, the first day of the regular season (Round 1).
- Position(s) are those played during the season.
- in the 2018 Reps columns:
  - The Int'l column indicates an appearance in the New Zealand versus Australia Test Match played on 13 October 2018, after this NRLW season. Three other women's internationals were played during 2018 but none of them involved NRLW 2018 players.
    - Australia
    - New Zealand
  - The single Origin match was played on Friday, 22 June 2018.
    - New South Wales
    - Queensland
  - Other icons indicate a past appearance in an All Stars match (between 2011 and 2017) or an appearance in the 2018 Prime Minister's XIII match
    - indicates an appearance for the Indigenous All Stars.
    - indicates an appearance for the NRL All Stars.
    - indicates an appearance for the Australian Prime Minister's XIII Women's team.
    - indicates an appearance for the Papua New Guinea Prime Minister's XIII Women's team.

== Brisbane Broncos ==
The Brisbane Broncos were coached by Paul Dyer. Ali Brigginshaw was appointed captain.

Jersey numbers in the table reflect the Broncos' Grand Final Team List.

J#	Player	Age	Position(s)	Club	Pre-NRLW Career			2018 NRLW					2018 Reps
J#	Player	Age	Position(s)	Club	Int'l	State	Stars	M	T	G	F	Pts	Int'l	State	PM13
17	Ngatokotoru Arakua	21	interchange	Papakura Sea Eagles	7	—	—	4	2	0	0	8		—	—
1	Chelsea Baker	32	Fullback	Gladstone Wallabies	5	3		4	2	15	0	38			—
8	Heather Ballinger	36	Prop	Wests Panthers	12	9		4	1	0	0	4			—
9	Brittany Breayley-Nati	27	Hooker	Ipswich Brothers	9	4		4	1	0	0	4			—
7	Ali Brigginshaw	28	Halfback	Ipswich Brothers	15	7		4	2	0	0	8			—
12	Maitua Feterika	26	Second-row	Ipswich Brothers	8	—	—	4	1	0	0	4			—
11	Teuila Fotu-Moala	24	Second-row	Otahuhu Leopards	9	—	—	4	1	0	0	4		—	—
14	Lavinia Gould	35	interchange	— Queensland Reds	—	—	—	4	1	0	0	4	—	—	—
10	Stephanie Hancock	36	Prop	Souths Logan Magpies	17	11		4	0	0	0	0			—
–	Tallisha Harden	26	interchange	Burleigh Bears	1	—		1	0	0	0	0	—		—
–	Kody House	28	Centre	Ipswich Brothers	—	3		1	1	0	0	4	—		—
5	Amelia Kuk	23	Wing, Centre	Ipswich Brothers	2	2	—	2	0	0	0	0	—
15	Chelsea Lenarduzzi	22	Prop	Burleigh Bears	—	1	—	4	0	0	0	0	—	—	—
6	Kimiora Breayley-Nati	30	Five-eighth	Manurewa Marlins	5	—	—	4	3	0	0	12		—	—
13	Rona Peters	30	Lock	Burleigh Bears	15	2	—	4	1	0	0	4	—		—
4	Amber Pilley	20	Centre	Burleigh Bears	—	—		4	0	0	0	0	—	—	—
2	Julia Robinson	20	Wing	Wests Panthers	—	—	—	4	2	0	0	8		—	—
16	Mariah Denman	21	interchange	Blackwater Crushers	—	—	—	3	0	0	0	0	—		—
–	Karley Te Kawa		Wing	Papakura Sea Eagles	4	—	—	2	1	0	0	4		—	—
3	Meg Ward	24	Wing, Centre	Souths Logan Magpies	3	—	—	3	1	0	0	4	—		—

Notes:

- The Brisbane Broncos announced player signings in several groupings from early June 2018 onwards:
1. Ali Brigginshaw, Brittany Breayley, Heather Ballinger, Teuila Fotu-Moala and Caitlin Moran.
2. Chelsea Baker, Tallisha Harden, Kody House, and Meg Ward.
3. Stephanie Hancock, Chelsea Lenarduzzi, Jayme Fressard and, Julia Robinson.
4. Ngatokotoru Araku, Maitua Feterika, Lilieta Manumau, Kimiora Nati, and Rona Peters.
5. Taylor Mapusua, Mariah Storch, and Karley Te Kawa.
6. Amelia Kuk.
7. Lavinia Gould.
- The Broncos played a trail match against the Papua New Guinea Orchids on 2 September 2018, as the first match in a double-header at Suncorp Stadium with a Round 25 NRL match between the Brisbane and Manly. All 22 players were named in the team. The Broncos won the match by 48 to 14.

== New Zealand Warriors ==
The New Zealand Warriors were coached by Luisa Avaiki. Laura Mariu was appointed captain.

Jersey numbers in the table reflect the Warriors' Round 3 Team List.

J#	Player	Age	Position(s)	Club	Pre-NRLW Career			2018 NRLW					2018 Reps
J#	Player	Age	Position(s)	Club	Int'l	State	Stars	M	T	G	F	Pts	Int'l	State	PM13
20	Racquel Anderson-Pitman	26	interchange	Manurewa Marlins	3	—	—	2	1	0	0	4	—	—	—
14	Sarina Clark	36	Centre	Manurewa Marlins	14	—	—	3	1	0	0	4	—	—	—
–	Lisa Edwards	25	Wing	Mt Albert Lions	—	—	—	1	0	0	0	0	—	—	—
13	Luisa Gago	24	Lock	Manurewa Marlins	2	—	—	3	1	0	0	4	—	—	—
7	Georgia Hale	23	Halfback	Richmond Roses	7	—	—	3	1	0	0	4		—	—
–	Amber Kani	27	interchange	Manurewa Marlins	5	—	—	1	0	0	0	0		—	—
4	Onjeurlina Leiataua	22	Second-row	Otahuhu Leopards	—	—	—	3	0	0	0	0		—	—
5	Hilda Peters	35	Wing	Manurewa Marlins	8	—	—	3	1	0	0	4	—	—	—
6	Laura Mariu	37	Five-eighth	Manurewa Marlins	24	—	—	3	0	0	0	0		—	—
24	Va'anessa Molia-Fraser	22	interchange	Richmond Roses	2	—	—	1	0	0	0	0	—	—	—
1	Apii Nicholls	25	Fullback	Otahuhu Leopards	5	—	—	3	0	3	0	6		—	—
11	Tanika-Jazz Noble-Bell	22	Prop	Manurewa Marlins	—	—	—	2	0	0	0	0	—	—	—
–	Annetta Nu'uausala	23	Prop	Richmond Roses	5	—	—	1	0	0	0	0		—	—
15	Lorina Papali'i	41	interchange	Richmond Roses	12	—	—	3	0	0	0	0	—	—	—
–	Kahurangi Peters	24	interchange	Manurewa Marlins	9	—	—	1	0	0	0	0	—	—	—
9	Krystal Rota	32	Hooker	Manurewa Marlins	8	—	—	3	0	0	0	0	—	—	—
10	Aieshaleigh Smalley	26	Prop	Otahuhu Leopards	4	—	—	3	1	0	0	4		—	—
–	Crystal Tamarua	23	Prop	Richmond Roses	1	—	—	1	0	0	0	0	—	—	—
18	Masuisuimatamaalii Tauaua-Pauaraisa	30	Lock	Linwood Keas	—	—	—	2	0	0	0	0		—	—
12	Alice Vailea	22	Second-row	Richmond Roses	—	—	—	3	0	0	0	0	—	—	—
2	Lanulangi Veainu	24	Wing, Centre	Otahuhu Leopards	2	—	—	3	0	0	0	0		—	—
3	Shontelle Woodman	32	Centre	Richmond Roses	7	—	—	2	0	0	0	0	—	—	—

Notes:

- The Warriors unveiled their 22-player squad on 31 July 2018.
- The Warriors played two trail matches, both against an Auckland representative team.
  - The first trial match was held on Friday, 10 August 2018 as the opening fixture in a double-header at Mount Smart Stadium with a Round 22 NRL match between the Warriors and Newcastle. All 22 players were named in the team and played in the match. The Warriors won the match, 32 to 4, with six players scoring tries: Amber Kani, Hilda Mariu, Langi Veainu, Tanika-Jazz Noble-Bell, Apii Nicholls, Sarina Fiso. Apii Nicholls kicked four conversions.
  - The second trial match was held on Mount Smart Stadium No 2 on Saturday, 25 August 2018. In this match, 17 members were named in the team and played. The Warriors won the match, 20 to 16, with three players scoring four tries: Annetta Nuuausala (2), Langi Veainu, Lisa Edwards. Apii Nicholls kicked two conversions.

== St. George Illawarra Dragons ==
The St. George Illawarra Dragons were coached by Daniel Lacey. Sam Bremner was appointed captain. Due to an injury to Bremner sustained in Round 1, Kezie Apps captained the team in Round 2 and 3.

Jersey numbers in the table reflect the Dragons' Round 3 Team List.

J#	Player	Age	Position(s)	Club	Pre-NRLW Career			2018 NRLW					2018 Reps
J#	Player	Age	Position(s)	Club	Int'l	State	Stars	M	T	G	F	Pts	Int'l	State	PM13
11	Kezie Apps	27	Second-row	Helensburgh Tigers	8	4		3	0	0	0	0			—
13	Annette Brander	25	Lock	Souths Logan Magpies	8	3		3	0	0	0	0			—
–	Samantha Bremner	26	Fullback	Helensburgh Tigers	6	6		1	1	0	0	4	—		—
16	Teina Clark	29	Prop	Cabramatta Two Blues	5	7		3	0	0	0	0	—	—	—
6	Keeley Davis	18	Five-eighth	Corrimal Cougars	—	—	—	3	0	0	0	0		—
19	Kate Haren	32	interchange	Wests Panthers	—	2	—	2	0	0	0	0	—	—	—
4	Honey Hireme	37	Fullback	—	20	—	—	3	1	0	0	4		—	—
2	Rikeya Horne	18	Wing	Corrimal Cougars	—	—	—	3	1	0	0	4	—	—
17	Melanie Howard	25	Five-eighth	CRL Newcastle	—	—	—	3	0	0	0	0	—	—
–	Asoiva Karpani	22	Prop	—	—	—	—	1	0	0	0	0	—	—	—
18	Asipau Mafi	24	Prop	Wests Panthers	—	1	—	3	0	0	0	0	—	—
7	Raecene McGregor	20	Halfback	Cabramatta Two Blues	4	—	—	3	0	0	0	0		—	—
12	Talesha Quinn	29	Second-row	Cronulla-Sutherland Sharks	3	2		2	0	0	0	0	—
8	Oneata Schwalger	23	Prop	—	—	—		3	0	0	0	0	—	—	—
3	Jessica Sergis	20	Centre	Cronulla-Sutherland Sharks	—	1	—	3	1	0	0	4	—	—	—
15	Hannah Southwell	19	Centre	CRL Newcastle	—	—	—	3	0	0	0	0
9	Anneka Stephens	29	Hooker	Joondalup Giants	—	—	—	3	0	0	0	0	—	—	—
5	Shakiah Tungai	21	Wing	Avondale Greyhounds	—	—	—	3	1	3	0	10	—	—
14	Holli Wheeler	28	Prop, Second-row	CRL Newcastle	—	—	—	3	0	0	0	0

Notes:

- The Dragons announced player signings in several groupings from early June 2018 onwards:
1. Kezie Apps, Sam Bremner and Talesha Quinn.
2. Honey Hireme, Rikeya Horne, Raecene McGregor and Jessica Sergis.
3. Oneata Schwalger, Anneka Stephens, and Holli Wheeler.
4. Talia Atfield, Georgina Brooker, Keeley Davis and Shakiah Tungai.
5. Teina Clark and Hannah Southwell.
6. Annette Brander, Kate Haren and Asipau Mafi.
7. Melanie Howard, Asoiva Karpani and Josie Strong.
- Three members of the squad were recruited from other Australian states after they played in the 2018 National Championships: Asoiva Karpani (South Australia), Oneata Schwalger (Victoria), and Anneka Stephens (Western Australia).

== Sydney Roosters ==
The Sydney Roosters were coached by Adam Hartigan. Simaima Taufa was appointed captain.

Jersey numbers in the table reflect the Roosters' Grand Final Team List.

J#	Player	Age	Position(s)	Club	Pre-NRLW Career			2018 NRLW					2018 Reps
J#	Player	Age	Position(s)	Club	Int'l	State	Stars	M	T	G	F	Pts	Int'l	State	PM13
1	Karina Brown	29	Fullback, Wing	East Brisbane Tigers	10	5		4	0	0	0	0			—
–	Chloe Caldwell	30	interchange	South Sydney Rabbitohs	2	3		2	0	0	0	0	—	—	—
12	Vanessa Foliaki	25	Second-row	East Brisbane Tigers	6	4		4	0	0	0	0	—		—
11	Tazmin Rapana	23	Second-row	Burleigh Bears	—	2		4	1	0	0	4			—
14	Kylie Hilder	42	Hooker	CRL Newcastle	1	2		4	0	0	0	0	—	—	—
4	Isabelle Kelly	21	Centre	CRL Newcastle	5	3		4	2	0	0	8			—
19	Kandy Kennedy	22	interchange	—	—	—		2	0	0	0	0	—	—	—
16	Victoria Latu	25	interchange	Cabramatta Two Blues	—	1	—	4	1	0	0	4	—	—	—
9	Nita Maynard-Perrin	26	Hooker	Cronulla-Sutherland Sharks	6	—	—	4	0	0	0	0			—
–	Sharon McGrady	25	Wing	South Sydney Rabbitohs	—	1	—	1	0	0	0	0	—	—	—
6	Lavina O'Mealey	34	Five-eighth	South Sydney Rabbitohs	4	—		4	1	0	0	4	—	—	—
2	Brydie Parker	18	Wing	—	—	—	—	2	1	0	0	4	—	—	—
5	Taleena Simon	25	Wing	South Sydney Rabbitohs	—	—		4	4	0	0	16	—		—
8	Ruan Sims	36	Prop	Cronulla-Sutherland Sharks	11	5		3	0	0	0	0	—	—	—
3	Shontelle Stowers	31	Centre	Cronulla-Sutherland Sharks	—	—	—	4	0	0	0	0	—	—	—
–	Maddie Studdon	23	Halfback	South Sydney Rabbitohs	6	4		2	0	0	0	0	—		—
13	Simaima Taufa	24	Prop, Lock	Mounties	7	4		4	0	0	0	0			—
7	Zahara Temara	21	Halfback, Lock	Burleigh Bears	4	1	—	4	0	3	0	6			—
15	Sarah Togatuki	20	interchange	Brothers Penrith	—	—	—	3	0	0	0	0	—	—
–	Botille Vette-Welsh	21	Fullback	Cabramatta Two Blues	—	—	—	1	0	0	0	0	—	—	—
10	Elianna Walton	33	Prop	Canterbury-Bankstown Bulldogs	10	9		4	0	0	0	0			—

Notes:

- The Sydney Roosters announced player signings in several groupings from mid June 2018 onwards:
1. Karina Brown, Nakia Davis-Welsh, Vanessa Foliaki, Kylie Hilder, Isabelle Kelly, Nita Maynard, Corban McGregor, Lavina O'Mealey, Taleena Simon, Ruan Sims, Shontelle Stowers, Maddie Studdon, Zahara Temara, Simaima Taufa, Elianna Walton.
2. Chloe Caldwell.
3. Brydie Parker.
4. Tazmin Gray, Kandy Kennedy, Victoria Latu, Sharon McGrady, Sarah Togatuki.
