= 2019 All Stars match =

Australian rugby league match

Indigenous All Stars	Māori All Stars
34	14
	1	2	3	4	Total
IND	10	10	4	10	34
MAO	6	4	4	0	14
- Date: 15 February 2019
- Stadium: AAMI Park
- Location: Melbourne, Victoria
- Preston Campbell Medal: Tyrone Roberts
- Referees: Grant Atkins, Gavin Badger
- Attendance: 18,802

Broadcast partners
- Commentators: Mat Thompson; Phil Gould; Andrew Johns

The 2019 All Stars match was the eighth annual representative exhibition All Stars match of Australian rugby league. The match was played between the Indigenous All Stars and the Māori All Stars and for the first time, the match was played in Victoria's AAMI Park. The match was held on 15 February 2019.

== Teams ==
INDIGENOUS ALL STARS	Position	MĀORI ALL STARS
Alex Johnston^{2}	Fullback	Peta Hiku
Blake Ferguson	Wing	Dane Gagai
Latrell Mitchell	Centre	Esan Marsters
James Roberts	Centre	Dean Whare
Josh Addo-Carr	Wing	Jordan Kahu
Cody Walker (c)	Five-eighth	Kalyn Ponga
Tyrone Roberts	Halfback	Jahrome Hughes
Andrew Fifita	Prop	Jesse Bromwich
Nathan Peats	Hooker	Brandon Smith
Leilani Latu^{1}	Prop	James Tamou^{3}
Will Chambers	2nd Row	Kevin Proctor
Adam Elliott	2nd Row	Adam Blair (c)
Tyrone Peachey	Lock	James Fisher-Harris
David Fifita	Interchange	Danny Levi
Chris Smith	Interchange	Brad Takairangi
Jesse Ramien	Interchange	Gerard Beale
Bevan French	Interchange	Tohu Harris
Kotoni Staggs	Interchange	Corey Harawira-Naera
Josh Kerr	Interchange	Kenny Bromwich
Craig Garvey^{4}	Interchange	Joseph Tapine
Laurie Daley	Coach	Stacey Jones

^{1} - Ryan James was originally selected to play but withdrew due to injury. Leilani Latu was moved from the bench to Prop and James was replaced by Josh Kerr.
^{2} - Ben Barba was originally selected to play but was withdrawn after his contract with the North Queensland Cowboys was terminated. Alex Johnston was moved from the bench to Fullback and Barba was replaced by Bevan French.
^{3} - Jordan McLean was originally selected to play but withdrew. James Tamou was moved from the bench to Prop and McLean was replaced by Kenny Bromwich.
^{4} - Tyrell Fuimaono was originally selected to play but withdrew. He was replaced by Craig Garvey.

== Result ==
15 February 2019
8:20pm (AEDT)

Indigenous All Stars	34 – 14	(Māori people) Māori All Stars
Tries: Josh Addo-Carr (11', 14') 2 Bevan French (33') 1 Blake Ferguson (39') 1 David Fifita (45') 1 Cody Walker (64') 1 Josh Kerr (73') 1 Goals: Latrell Mitchell 3/7 (15', 40', 75'); Field Goals: Tyrone Roberts 0/1	1st: 10 - 6; 2nd: 10 - 4; 3rd: 4 - 4; 4th: 10 - 0	Tries: Dane Gagai (3', 28') 2 Esan Marsters (51') 1 Goals: Jordan Kahu 1/2 (4'); Esan Marsters 0/1

AAMI Park
Attendance: 18,802
Preston Campbell Medal: Tyrone Roberts
Referee: Grant Atkins, Gavin Badger

== Women's All Stars match ==
For the seventh time, a Women's All Stars match was held. The match, like the men's one will be held on 15 February 2019.

2019 Women All Stars match
Indigenous Women's All Stars	Maori Women's All Stars
4	8
	1	2	3	4	Total
IND	0	0	4	0	4
MAO	4	0	0	4	8
- Date: Friday 15 February 2019
- Stadium: AAMI Park
- Location: Melbourne, Victoria
- Attendance: 18,802

Broadcast partners

=== Teams ===
INDIGENOUS WOMEN'S ALL STARS	Position	MĀORI WOMEN'S ALL STARS
Tahlia Hunter	Fullback	Botille Vette-Welsh
Terri Ann Cain	Wing	Hilda (Mariu) Peters
Amber Pilley	Centre	Jonsal Tautari
Shaylee Bent	Centre	Amber Kani
Shakiah Tungai	Wing	Tyler Birch
Quincy Dodd	Five-eighth	Zahara Temara
Sharon McGrady	Halfback	Teeaye Hapuku
Rebecca Young	Prop	Kararaina Wira
Akayla McQuire	Hooker	Krystal Rota (c)
Layla Fauid	Prop	Kahurangi Peters
Samartha Leisha	2nd Row	Geneva Webber
Caitlan Johnston	2nd Row	Tazmin Gray
Kandy Kennedy	Lock	Rona Peters (c)
Tallisha Harden	Interchange	Christyl Stowers
Kyara Nean	Interchange	Kathleen (Wharton) Keremete
Regan Hart	Interchange	Charlette (Harata) Butler
Tommaya Kelly Sines	Interchange	Kerehitina Matua
Layna Nona Busch	Interchange	Acacia Claridge-Te Iwimate
Dean Widders	Coach	Rusty Matua

== Result ==
15 February 2019

Indigenous Women's All Stars	4 – 8	(Māori people) Maori Women's All Stars
Tries: Shakiah Tungai (31') 1	Report; Highlights	Tries: Tyler Birch (10') 1 Krystal Rota (54') 1

AAMI Park
Referee: Ziggy Przeklasa-Adamski & Belinda Sharpe
