= 2018 Rugby League Commonwealth Championship =

The 2018 Rugby League Commonwealth Championship was a rugby league nines tournament organised by the Rugby League International Federation (RLIF) and played in the Moreton Bay Region, Queensland, Australia in February 2018. The event, featured eight men's teams, six women's teams and three physical disability teams, was one of the exhibition sports for the 2018 Commonwealth Games and was in support of the bid for rugby league nines to be a full medal event at the 2022 Commonwealth Games.

The tournament was dominated by Australia, who won all three competitions.

== Competing nations and pools ==
The 2014 tournament limited the men's competition to under-18 players. For this competition the upper age was increased to make the tournament an under-23 competition.

Men's U23
Team	Coach
Pool A
Australia	Adrian Lam
Fiji	
Scotland	Nathan Graham
Wales	Shane Eccles
Pool B
England	Alan Coleman
Papua New Guinea	Colin Geno
Samoa	Tony Puletua & Lino Salafai
Tonga	Willie Manu

Women's
Team	Coach
Pool A
Australia	Brad Donald
Fiji	
Samoa	Frank Fuimaono
Pool B
Canada	Mike Castle
Cook Islands	Teivao Tamariki
Tonga	Andrew Emelio

Physical disability
Team	Coach
Australia	Shaun Spence
New Zealand	Raymond Greaves
Commonwealth All Stars	Luke Muttdon

== Fixtures ==
All the games were played at Dolphin Stadium, home of Queensland rugby league side, Redcliffe Dolphins, on 23 and 24 February. All the pool games in the men's and women's teams were played on 23 February with the play-offs and medal matches played on 24 February. In the physical disability tournament four match were played on the first day with two more and the gold medal match played on the second day.

All times are Queensland local time, UTC+10:00.

== Women's tournament ==
=== Pool A ===
Team	Pld	W	D	L	PF	PA	+/−	Pts
Australia	2	2	0	0	50	4	+46	4
Samoa	2	1	0	1	28	32	−4	2
Fiji	2	0	0	2	6	48	−42	0

23 February 2018	Fiji	6 – 24	Samoa
11:05am	Tries: Paulini Korowaqa; Goals: Wainikiti Deqku (1)		Tries: Atasi Lafia (2), Shontelle Stowers (2), Christine Pauli, Sarah Togatuki

23 February 2018	Australia	26 – 4	Samoa
2:10pm	Tries: Ali Brigginshaw (2), Karina Brown, Nakia Davis-Welsh, Rikeya Horne, Corban McGregor; Goals: Maddie Studdon (1)		Tries: Maitua Feterika

23 February 2018	Australia	24 – 0	Fiji
7:05pm	Tries: Chelsea Baker, Annette Brander, Nakia Davis-Welsh, Corban McGregor, Maddie Studdon; Goals: Tallisha Harden (1), Maddie Studdon (1)

=== Pool B ===
Team	Pld	W	D	L	PF	PA	+/−	Pts
Tonga	2	2	0	0	20	8	+12	4
Cook Islands	2	1	0	1	24	24	0	2
Canada	2	0	0	2	16	28	−12	0

23 February 2018	Canada	4 – 8	Tonga
11:30am	Tries: Maira Acevedo		Tries: Lanulangi Veainu (2)

23 February 2018	Cook Islands	4 – 12	Tonga
2:45pm	Tries: Toka Natua		Tries: Takilele Katoa, Joy Tedeschi; Goals: Takilele Katoa (1), Lanulangi Veainu (1)

23 February 2018	Canada	12 – 20	Cook Islands
5:40pm	Tries: Allana Fittes, Janai Haupapa, Tiera Thomas-Reynolds		Tries: Kiritapu Demant, Inangaro Maraeara, Te Kura Ngata-Aerengamate, Jean-Shannel Robati

=== Semi-finals and play-offs ===
24 February 2018	Australia	14 – 8	Cook Islands
11:35am	Tries: Nakia Davis-Welsh, Isabelle Kelly, Corban McGregor; Goals: Brittany Breayley (1)		Tries: Kiritapu Demant, Mazelina Haurua

24 February 2018	Tonga	0 – 20	Samoa
12:00pm			Tries: Maitua Feterika, Taliah Fuimaono, Louisa Gago, Shontelle Stowers, Sarah Togatuki

24 February 2018; 5th place play-off	Canada	16 – 12 (extra time)	Fiji
1:50pm	Tries: Andrea Burk, Justine Pelletier, Stevi Schnoor, Tiera Thomas-Reynolds		Tries: Ema Adivitaloga, Paulini Korowaqa, Sereama Nagatalevu

24 February 2018; Bronze medal play-off	Cook Islands	20 – 0	Tonga
4:00pm	Tries: Kiritapu Demant (2), Inangaro Maraeara, Kimiora Nati, Apii Nicholls-Pualau

24 February 2018; Gold medal play-off	Australia	14 – 8	Samoa
4:25pm	Tries: Chelsea Baker, Nakia Davis-Welsh, Zahara Temara; Goals: Zahara Temara (1)		Tries: Louisa Gago, Shontelle Stowers

== Men's U23 tournament ==
=== Pool A ===
Team	Pld	W	D	L	PF	PA	+/−	Pts
Australia	3	3	0	0	92	4	+88	6
Fiji	3	2	0	1	30	38	−8	4
Scotland	3	1	0	2	34	50	−16	2
Wales	3	0	0	3	4	68	−64	0

23 February 2018	Fiji	14 – 10	Scotland
12:05pm	Tries: Sam Kurukitoga, Netani Narisia, Joeli Vulavou; Goals: Roseru Naiwasetawa (1)		Tries: Curtis Faughlin (2); Goals: Matt Hogg (1)

23 February 2018	Australia	32 – 0	Wales
12:30pm	Tries: Paul Momirovski (3), Corey Allan, Michael Carroll, Hayden Schwass, Kotoni Staggs; Goals: Corey Allan (1)

23 February 2018	Australia	36 – 0	Scotland
3:10pm	Tries: Corey Allan (2), Jade Anderson (2), Luke Sharpe (2), Kotoni Staggs; Goals: Kotoni Staggs (2), Jade Anderson (1), Luke Sharpe (1)

23 February 2018	Fiji	12 – 4	Wales
3:35pm	Tries: Sam Kurukitoga, Netani Narisia, RT Timoli		Tries: Liam Silver

23 February 2018	Scotland	24 – 0	Wales
6:05pm	Tries: Niall Sidney (2), Justin Faughlin, Matt Hogg, Luke Westman; Goals: Matt Hogg (2)

23 February 2018	Australia	24 – 4	Fiji
7:30pm	Tries: Corey Allan, Luke Huth, Hayden Schwass, Kotoni Staggs; Goals: Luke Huth (1), Kotoni Staggs (1)		Tries: RT Timoli

=== Pool B ===
Team	Pld	W	D	L	PF	PA	+/−	Pts
Tonga	3	3	0	0	54	26	+28	6
Samoa	3	2	0	1	52	46	+6	4
England	3	1	0	2	28	44	−16	2
Papua New Guinea	3	0	0	3	30	48	−18	0

23 February 2018	Tonga	22 – 8	Samoa
10:15am	Tries: Addison Demetriou (2), Joseph Kaufusitua, Sosaia Talivakaola; Goals: Sione Tonga (1)		Tries: Tom Sau, Frank Toomalatai

23 February 2018	England	10 – 28	Samoa
12:55pm	Tries: Tyler Spence, Cole Walker-Taylor; Goals: Tyler Spence (1)		Tries: Poasa Faamausili, Maliko Filino, Tom Sau, Marli Sini, Ken Tofilau, Frank Toomalatai; Goals: Arthur Crichton (1), Marli Sini (1)

23 February 2018	Papua New Guinea	12 – 20	Tonga
1:45pm	Tries: Paul Nelson (2), Yabra Kuk		Tries: Addison Demetriou (2), Mali Lepou, Sione Vea; Goals: Joseph Kaufusitua (1), Netane Masina (1)

23 February 2018	Samoa	16 – 14	Papua New Guinea
4:50pm	Tries: Poasa Faamausili, Jordan Seumanu, Denzal Tonise, Frank Toomalatai		Tries: Dickson Amea, Paul Nelson, John Ragi Jnr; Goals: Paul Nelson (1)

23 February 2018	England	6 – 12	Tonga
5:15pm	Tries: Cole Walker-Taylor; Goals: Cole Walker-Taylor (1)		Tries: Taealoaloa Amone, Addison Demetriou, Myles Taueli

23 February 2018	England	12 – 4	Papua New Guinea
	Tries: Darrion Ball, Samuel Rotchford, Daniel Sowerby		Tries: Ilias Stanley

=== Semi-finals and play-offs ===
24 February 2018	Scotland	16 – 14	Papua New Guinea
10:45am	Tries: Davey Dixon, Curtis Faughlin, Ali Olivier; Goals: Matt Hogg (2)		Tries: Dickson Amea, John Ragi Jnr, Standford Talita; Goals: Dickson Amea (1)

24 February 2018	England	8 – 10	Wales
11:10am	Tries: Frankie Halton, Gregory Howland		Tries: Liam Silver (2); Goals: Paul Edwards (1)

24 February 2018	Australia	18 – 10	Samoa
1:00pm	Tries: Conor Carey, Michael Carroll, Paul Momirovski; Goals: Michael Carroll (1), Luke Sharpe (1), Kotoni Staggs (1)		Tries: Arthur Crichton, Frank Toomalatai; Goals: Arthur Crichton (1)

24 February 2018	Tonga	22 – 6	Fiji
1:25pm	Tries: Taealoaloa Amone, Addison Demetriou, George Ili, Sione Tonga, Arthor Tupou; Goals: Netane Masima (1)		Tries: Penaia Aeveltue; Goals: RT Timoti

24 February 2018; 7th place play-off	Papua New Guinea	0 – 14	England
2:15pm			Tries: Gregory Howland, Liam Quinn, Tyler Spence; Goals: Owen Restall (1)

24 February 2018; 5th place play-off	Scotland	16 – 10	Wales
2:40pm	Tries: Davey Dixon, Matt Hogg, Luke Westman; Goals: Matt Hogg (2)		Tries: Karlin Claridge, Paul Edwards; Goals: Paul Edwards (2)

24 February 2018; Bronze medal play-off	Samoa	20 – 6	Fiji
5:25pm	Tries: Arthur Crichton, Nathan Leatigaga, Charlton Schaafhausen, Alex Seve, Frank Toomalatai		Tries: RT Timoli; Goals: RT Timoli (1)

23 February 2018; Gold medal play-off	Australia	14 – 8	Tonga
5:50pm	Tries: Jade Anderson, Conor Carey, Kotoni Staggs; Goals: Luke Sharpe (1)		Tries: Addison Demetriou, Isileli Uilou

== Physical disabilities tournament ==
=== Pool stage ===
Team	Pld	W	D	L	PF	PA	+/−	Pts
Australia	4	3	1	0	18	0	+18	7
New Zealand	4	1	2	1	4	6	−2	4
Commonwealth All Stars	4	0	1	3	0	16	−16	1

23 February 2018	New Zealand	4 – 0	Commonwealth All Stars	(field 2)
10:40am	Tries: Lisa Adams

23 February 2018	Australia	8 – 0	Commonwealth All Stars
1:20pm	Tries: Craig Anderson, Mitchell Gleeson

23 February 2018	Australia	4 – 0	Commonwealth All Stars	(field 2)
3:10pm	Tries: Mitchell Gleeson

23 February 2018	Australia	6 – 0	New Zealand
6:40pm	Tries: Kyle Lloyd; Goals: George Tonna (1)

24 February 2018	New Zealand	0 – 0	Commonwealth All Stars
10:20am

24 February 2018	Australia	0 – 0	New Zealand
12:35pm

=== Play-off ===
24 February 2018	Australia	0 – 0	New Zealand
3:05pm

Australia were declared the gold medalists due to having a better pool result.

== Leading try-scorers ==
- Men's U23: Addison Demetriou (7)
- Women's: Nakia Davis-Welsh, Kiritapu Demant, Shontelle Stowers (4)
- Physical disability: Mitchell Gleeson (2)
