= Papakura High School =

Location
- Willis Road, Papakura; Auckland; New Zealand; 37.0639°S 174.9510°E

Information
- Type: State secondary school
- Motto: Māori: Kia Rangatira (a call for young people to step up as leaders)
- Established: 1954
- Ministry of Education Institution no.: 101
- Chairperson: Michelle Proctor
- Principal: Simon Craggs (since 2021)
- Enrolment: 1,337 (July 2026)
- Socio-economic decile: 1B
- Website: www.papakurahigh.school.nz

Papakura High School (PHS) is a co-educational state secondary school based in the Auckland suburb of Papakura in New Zealand, catering for students from Year 9 to Year 13.

The school was established in 1954 and is now made up of a diverse student body, administering students from the greater southern Auckland area. The school is located on the southern boundary of the Auckland metropolitan area, located approximately 32 kilometres south of Auckland CBD. In 2021 a school enrolment zone was introduced and encompasses the Papakura, Clevedon and Hunua area.

== Enrolment ==
As of July 2026, Papakura High School has a roll of 1,337 students, of which 640 (47.9%) identify as Māori.

As of 2026, the school has an Equity Index of 531, placing it amongst schools whose students have the most socioeconomic barriers to achievement (roughly equivalent to deciles 1 and 2 under the former socio-economic decile system).

== School structure ==
The school is organised into four whānau: Kirikiri, Te Apārangi, Otuuwairoa, and Waipapa. The school consulted the kaumātua (leaders) of their local iwi, Ngāti Tamaoho. In partnership with them, the original three whānau were named after historic places in the Papakura area, which are locations of importance within the rohe of the local iwi. These three whānau replaced the school's old house structure (Note: The four former School Houses were named: Freyberg, Fergusson, Bledisloe and Cobham) at the beginning of the 2017 school year. Waipapa whānau was added in 2024 following significant roll growth.

Also in 2017, the school changed its school motto to Kia Rangatira. This whakataukī (Māori maxim) signifies a call to the young to step up as leaders. In Māori culture, it is a challenge to take on a chiefly demeanour in behaviour and attitudes, with rangatira meaning high ranking, chiefly, noble, or esteemed in te reo (Māori).

== ERO Reports ==
Although the Ministry of Education's Education Review Office (ERO) 2015 report was less positive, they summarised their 2020 report on Papakura High School with the remark "Leaders and staff are steadily improving outcomes for learners. Leaders have worked with determination to better serve students and their school community. Students, whānau, trustees and staff are expressing an increased optimism and pride in their school. The school has made significant improvement. The quality of teaching and curriculum design requires further development to improve student outcomes."

== School curriculum ==
The school offers National Certificate of Educational Achievement (NCEA) as its national qualification standard. Students are able to sit NCEA Level 1 papers as early Year 11, however Papakura High School is one of the few colleges in Auckland to offer an NCEA Level 1 Humanities class to academically able Year 10 students also.

Selected senior students have the opportunity to participate in "Gateway", where they individually attend work experience placements during the school term, organised by the Careers department. The school also offers Correspondence papers for specialised subjects and regularly holds workshops and information sessions for students and their chosen programme.

The school also recently introduced national qualifications into unit standard courses of Mathematics, Sports and Recreation, Technology, and Catering, where students can work towards NCEA credits as well as gaining a national qualification. Papakura High School was the first school in New Zealand to offer the Marae Catering course under the NCEA structure.

== Notable alumni ==
- Ioane Fitu Afoa – former All Black
- Billy-Jean Ale – Women's New Zealand Warriors & Kiwi Ferns
- Mary Jane Ale – Former Kiwi Ferns
- Junior Fa – Tongan – New Zealand professional boxer and Commonwealth Games Bronze Medallist
- Jerome Kaino – former All Black
- Patrick Mailata – New Zealand professional boxer
- Karley Te Kawa – Brisbane Broncos & Kiwi Ferns
- Jazz Tevaga – New Zealand Warriors & Toa Samoa
- Atawhai Tupaea – Former Women's New Zealand Warriors & Kiwi Ferns

== See also ==
- Papakura District
- Ministry of Education (New Zealand)
