= John Afoa =

New Zealand rugby union player

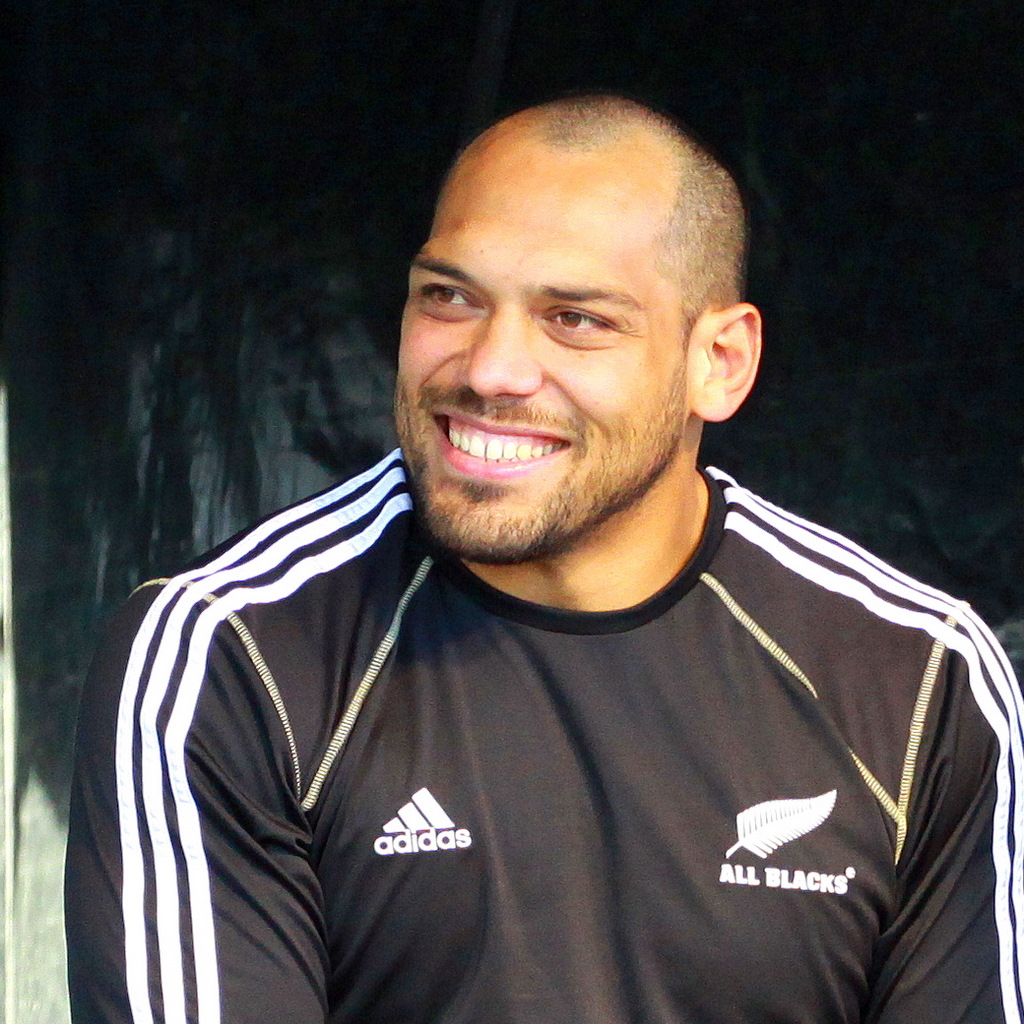
- Afoa during the New Zealand Christchurch visit, September 2011
- Full name: Ioane Fitu Afoa
- Born: 16 October 1983 (age 43) Auckland, New Zealand
- Height: 183 cm (6 ft 0 in)
- Weight: 121 kg (267 lb; 19 st 1 lb)
- School: St. Kentigern College

Rugby union career
- Position: Prop
- Current team: Crusaders
Senior career
Years	Team	Apps	(Points)
2002–2010	Auckland	70	(5)
2004–2011	Blues	101	(15)
2011–2014	Ulster	58	(15)
2014–2018	Gloucester	105	(35)
2018–2022	Bristol Bears	89	(5)
2022–	Vannes	14	(0)
2023	Crusaders	2	(0)
2023	Bay of Plenty	8	(0)
- Correct as of 26 April 2024
International career
Years	Team	Apps	(Points)
2003–2004	New Zealand U21	9	(5)
2005–2011	New Zealand	38	(5)
2005–2007	Junior All Blacks	9	(5)
- Correct as of 23 September 2021

Ioane Fitu "John" Afoa (born 16 September 1983) is a former professional rugby union player from New Zealand. He played prop for Auckland, the Blues, Ulster, Gloucester, Bristol Bears, Vannes, the Crusaders and Bay of Plenty, and won 38 caps for the All-Blacks.

== Personal life ==
Afoa was a student at Auckland's Papakura High School, then St. Kentigern College, where he played first XV rugby alongside fellow All Blacks Joe Rokocoko and Jerome Kaino.

== Rugby career ==
Afoa played provincial rugby for Auckland between 2002 and 2011. He played for the Blues in Super Rugby, making his debut in 2004 against the Brumbies. He made 101 appearances with the team between 2004 and 2011.

He then moved to Europe, playing for Ulster in the Pro12 from 2011 until 2014, before joining Gloucester in the English Premiership on a four-year contract worth £400,000 per season. This made him one of the highest-paid players in the Premiership and the third highest-paid player in European rugby. He left Gloucester to join local rivals Bristol Bears ahead of the 2018–19 season. After four seasons with the Bears, he moved to France to join Pro D2 side Vannes from the 2022–23 season.

In May 2023, Afoa returned to New Zealand, joining the Crusaders under Scott Robertson to alleviate the team's front row injury crisis. He debuted at tighthead prop for the Crusaders match against the Waratahs, and became the oldest ever Super Rugby player at the age of 39 years and 233 days. He also played provincial rugby for Bay of Plenty. He retired in October 2023.

== International career ==
Afoa represented New Zealand at a number of age-grade levels. He played for the New Zealand U16 team in 1999, New Zealand Schools in 2000–2001, New Zealand under-19 in 2002–2003, and the New Zealand under-21 side that won the Under 21 Rugby World Championship in 2003 and 2004. He was one of four New Zealanders named in the IRB's team of the 2003 tournament.

In 2005, Afoa was selected for the All Blacks Tri-nations squad, but made no appearances in the competition. He earned his first test cap in the end-of-year tour. In November 2005, Afoa finally became the All Black number 1062 when he started against Ireland at Lansdowne Road. In 2010, the All-Blacks played him at hooker experimentally, and the same year he scored his first test try, running in from 30 metres against Wales. His test career ended after the 2011 Rugby World Cup. He played 36 tests, 30 as a substitute.

== Coaching career ==
Afoa was appointed scrum coach at Bristol Bears from the 2021–22 season, alongside his playing duties.

After retiring from playing in 2023, he took up the position of general manager at Auckland University Rugby Club.
