= William Kennedy (rugby league, born 1969) =

Australian rugby league footballer

William Kennedy Sr
Personal information
- Full name: William "Bubba" Kennedy
- Born: 27 January 1969 (age 57)

Playing information
- Position: Centre
Club
Years	Team	Pld	T	G	FG	P
1996–98	Balmain Tigers	61	26	0	0	104
Representative
Years	Team	Pld	T	G	FG	P
1994	Australian Aborigines	1	1	0	0	4
1997	NSW Country	1	1	0	0	4
- Relatives: William Kennedy Jr (son); Kandy Kennedy (daughter)

William "Bubba" Kennedy (born 27 January 1969) is an Australian former professional rugby league footballer who played for the Balmain Tigers.

== Biography ==
Kennedy, an Indigenous Australian, played as a centre at Balmain for three seasons, from 1996 to 1998. He was the club's leading try scorer in each of his first two seasons and made 61 first-grade appearances in total.

He played for the Australian Aborigines team in the semi-final of the 1994 Pacific Cup 21-20 defeat to Fiji, scoring a try.

In 1997, Kennedy came off the bench and scored a try in NSW Country's 17-4 win over City in the annual City vs Country Origin representative fixture.

Since leaving Balmain he continued to play country rugby league into his late 40s. The teams he played for include Lithgow Workies, Bathurst Panthers, Orange Hawks, Cabonne United, Mudgee Dragons and the Blayney Bears.

His son, William Jr, is a member of the Cronulla Sharks NRL squad and his daughter, Kandy, played for the Roosters in the NRLW.
