= Va'anessa Molia-Fraser =

New Zealand & Samoa international rugby league footballer

Personal information
- Born: 18 January 1996 (age 30) Auckland, New Zealand
- Height: 173 cm (5 ft 8 in)
- Weight: 80 kg (12 st 8 lb)

Playing information
- Position: Centre, Fullback
Club
Years	Team	Pld	T	G	FG	P
2018	New Zealand Warriors	1	0	0	0	0
Representative
Years	Team	Pld	T	G	FG	P
2016–17	New Zealand	2	0	0	0	0
2019	Samoa	1	0	0	0	0
- Source: RLP As of 7 November 2020

Va'anessa Molia-Fraser (born 18 January 1996) is a New Zealand rugby league footballer who played for the New Zealand Warriors in the NRL Women's Premiership. She is a New Zealand and Samoa international.

== Playing career ==
Molia-Fraser has played for the Bay Roskill Vikings and Richmond Roses in the Auckland Rugby League.

On 6 May 2016, Molia-Fraser made her Test debut for New Zealand, starting at centre in their 26–16 win over Australia. On 5 May 2017, she played her second Test for New Zealand, starting at centre in a 4–16 loss to Australia.

On 1 August 2018, Molia-Fraser joined the New Zealand Warriors NRL Women's Premiership team. In Round 3 of the 2018 NRL Women's season, she made her debut for the Warriors in a 10–32 loss to the Brisbane Broncos.

On 22 June 2019, she made her Test debut for Samoa in their 8–46 loss to New Zealand.

On 10 July 2019, she was named in the Warriors' 2019 squad but later withdrew due to injury.
