= Isaiah Papali'i =

New Zealand & Samoa international rugby league footballer

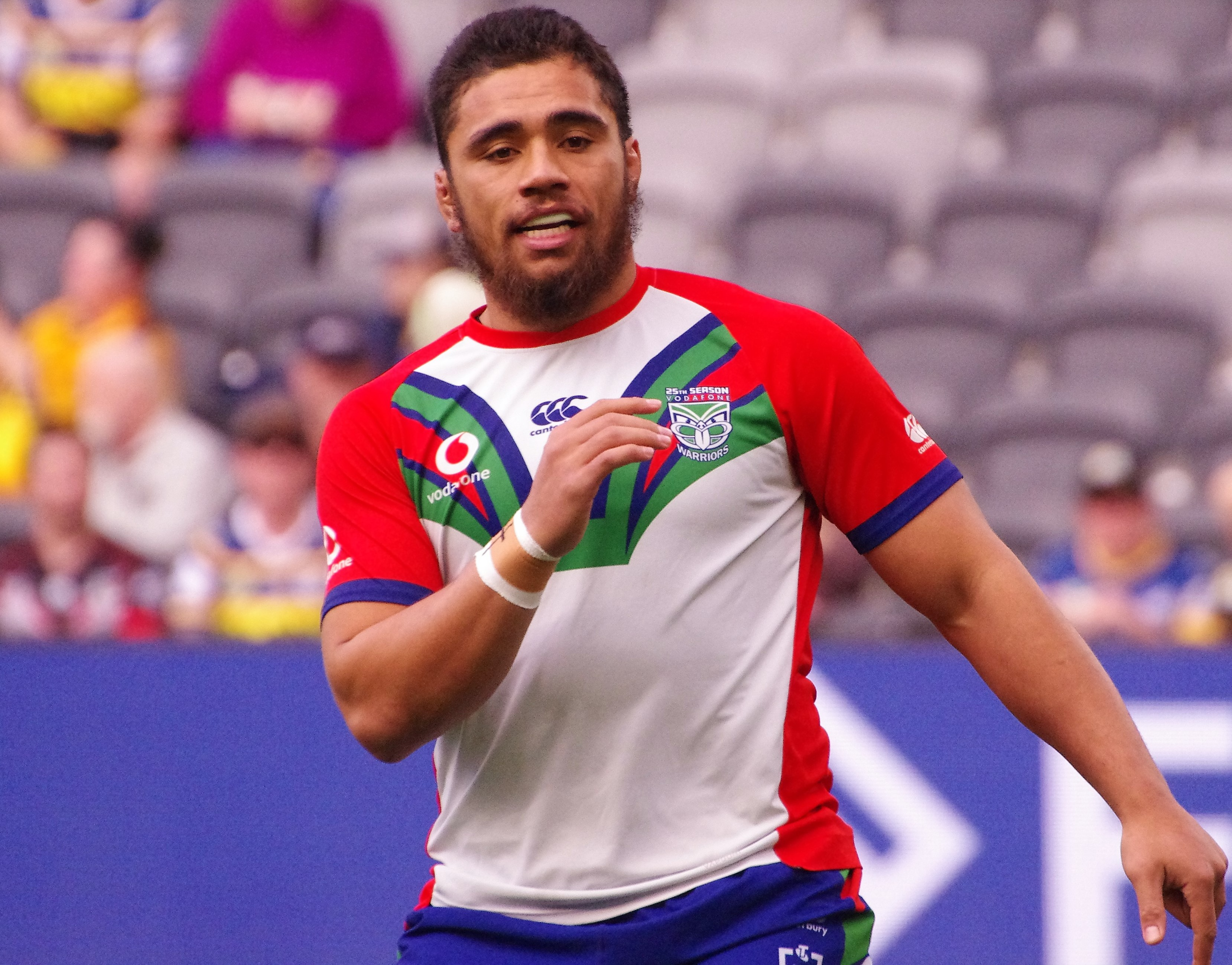

Personal information
- Born: 20 September 1998 (age 28) Auckland, New Zealand
- Height: 182 cm (6 ft 0 in)
- Weight: 111 kg (17 st 7 lb)

Playing information
- Position: Second-row, Lock
Club
Years	Team	Pld	T	G	FG	P
2017–20	New Zealand Warriors	63	7	0	0	28
2021–22	Parramatta Eels	53	17	0	0	68
2023–24	Wests Tigers	39	7	0	0	28
2025–	Penrith Panthers	48	10	0	0	40
	Total	203	41	0	0	164
Representative
Years	Team	Pld	T	G	FG	P
2018	Samoa	1	0	0	0	0
2018–	New Zealand	20	6	1	0	26
- Source: As of 17 November 2026
- Education: Mount Albert Grammar School
- Mother: Lorina Papali'i

Isaiah Papali'i (born 20 September 1998) is a professional rugby league footballer who plays as a second-row forward for the Penrith Panthers in the National Rugby League (NRL). He has played for both Samoa and New Zealand at international level.

He previously played for the New Zealand Warriors, the Parramatta Eels and the Wests Tigers in the NRL.

== Early life ==
Papali'i was born in Auckland, New Zealand and is of Samoan descent. His mother, Lorina Papali'i, represented New Zealand in rugby league and Samoa in rugby union.

In 2014, Papali'i won two gold medals at the Oceania Weightlifting Championships in New Caledonia, winning the U17(Youth) and U20(Junior) divisions by lifting a personal best of 107 kg in the snatch and 125 kg in the clean and jerk. His parents own a gym in Avondale.

Papali'i attended Te Atatu intermediate as a youth and later attended Mount Albert Grammar School and played for their first XV rugby union side. At the same time as he was playing rugby league for the Junior Warriors. The First XV won the championship in 2016 and Papali'i won the team's player of the year award.

== Playing career ==
Papali'i played his junior rugby league for the Te Atatu Roosters, before being signed by the New Zealand Warriors.

In 2015, he toured Australia with the New Zealand under-18 side.

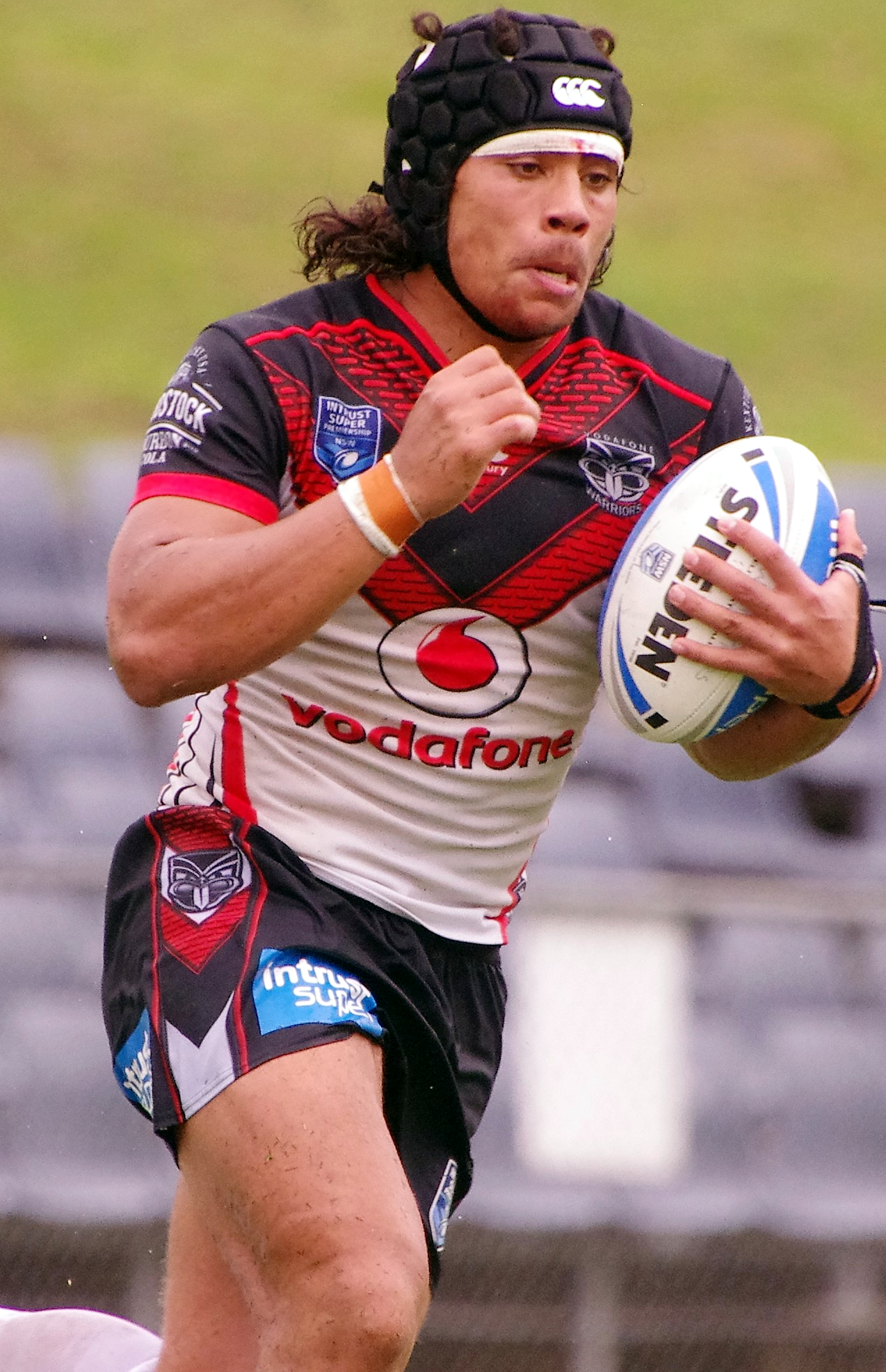
Papali'i playing for the New Zealand Warriors in 2017

=== 2016 ===
In 2016, Papali'i played for the New Zealand Warriors' NYC team.

In May, he played for the Junior Kiwis against the Junior Kangaroos.

In October, he re-signed with the Warriors on a three-year contract until the end of 2019.

That year, Papali’i mixed rugby league and rugby union, making 11 appearances for the Warriors' NYC side, while also playing for Mount Albert Grammar School's title-winning First XV.

=== 2017 ===
In round 1 of the 2017 NRL season, Papali'i made his NRL debut for the Warriors against the Newcastle Knights.

=== 2018 ===
In 2018, Papali'i made 20 appearances for the club as they finished 8th on the table and qualified for the finals. Papali'i played from the bench in the clubs 27-12 elimination final loss against Penrith. In October, he was named in the Kiwis’ squad for four-Test campaign against Australia and England as well as being selected for the Junior Kiwis for their clash against the Junior Kangaroos. He re-signed with the Warriors until the end of the 2020 NRL season.

=== 2019 ===
On 12 March, Papali'i was stood down by the Warriors due to a drink driving offence which had occurred on 1 January. It was reported that Papali'i did not provide police with a breath test.

"We expect better from our players and anyone who falls short of our standards will be appropriately dealt with irrespective of the time of year or their standing within the club," Warriors CEO Cameron George said, "Isaiah is extremely remorseful for his actions. He feels like he's let his team-mates, the club, our fans and his family down. He is now determined to win back their respect and will also be fighting hard to earn back his spot in the team."

The same year, Isaiah's mother Lorina Papali'i was playing for the New Zealand Warriors in the inaugural NRL Women's Premiership, an unprecedented instance of a mother and son representing the same club in the same season.

=== 2020 ===
He played 15 games for the Warriors in the 2020 NRL season as the club missed the finals. In October, he signed a contract to join Parramatta for the 2021 season.

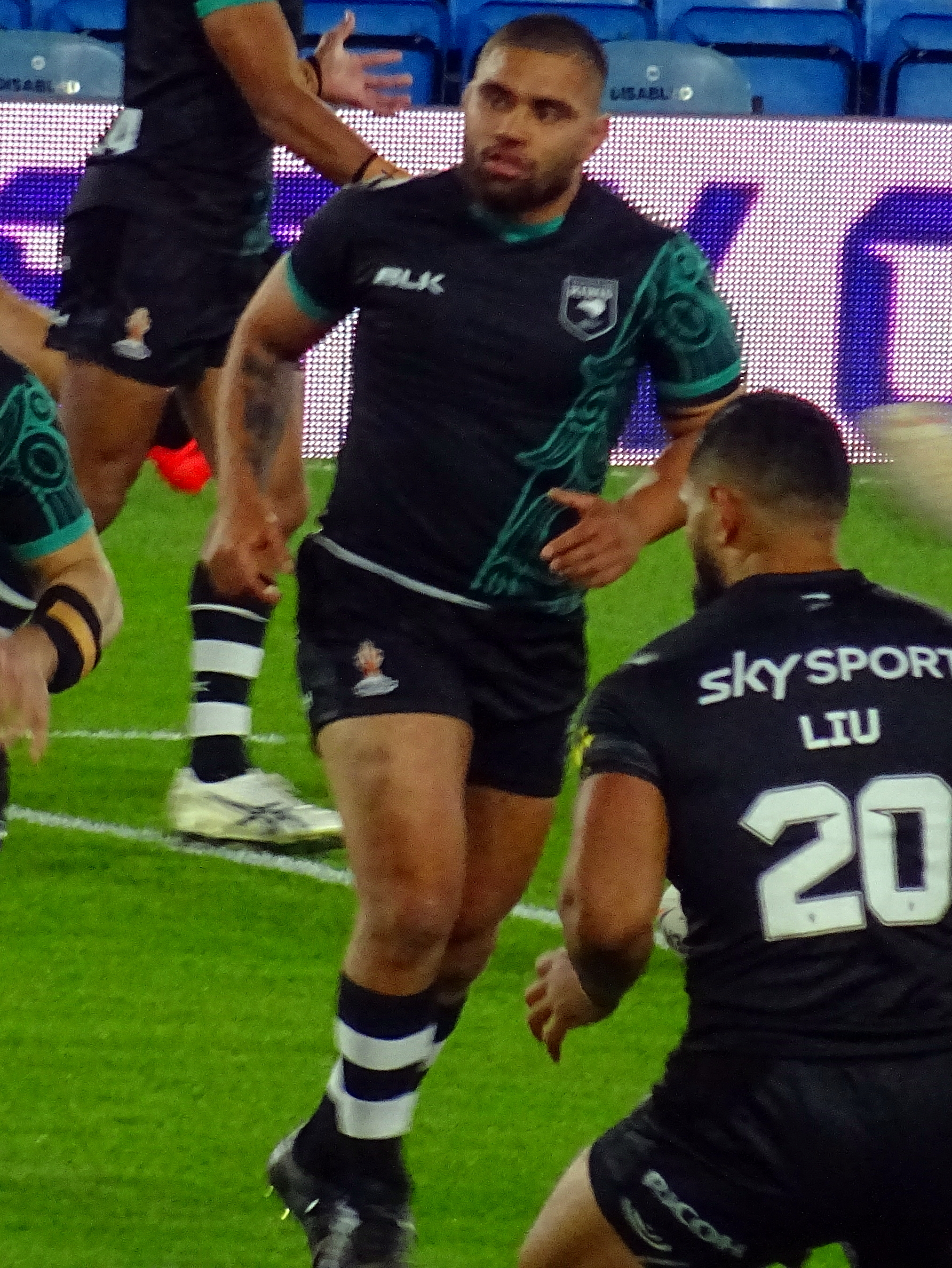
Papali'i warming up for the Kiwis in 2022

=== 2021 ===
He made his debut for Parramatta in round 1 of the 2021 NRL season, coming off the interchange bench in the club's 24-16 victory over Brisbane.

In round 6, he scored two tries for Parramatta in their 35-10 victory over Canberra.

In round 14, he was sent to the sin bin in Parramatta's 40-12 victory over the Wests Tigers after deliberately dropping his knee onto the head of Wests player Tom Amone.

Papali'i made a total of 25 appearances for Parramatta in the 2021 NRL season including both finals matches against Newcastle and Penrith as the club went out of the finals in the second week for the third straight season. In September, Papali'i was awarded the Ken Thornett Medal as Parramatta's player of the season.

On 27 September, Papali'i was named Dally M Second Rower of the year. On November 18, it was confirmed that he would move to the Wests Tigers starting in the 2023 season, on a three-year deal. Papali'i was initially offered a new contract by Parramatta worth $400,000 a season but instead decided to join Wests after they offered $600,000 a season.

=== 2022 ===
In round 10 of the 2022 NRL season, he scored two tries for Parramatta in a 31-24 loss against the Sydney Roosters.

Papali'i played a total of 28 games for Parramatta in 2022 including their Grand Final loss to Penrith.

In October he was named in the New Zealand squad for the 2021 Rugby League World Cup.

=== 2023 ===
Papali'i played a total of 23 games for the Wests Tigers in the 2023 NRL season as the club finished with the Wooden Spoon for a second straight year.

=== 2024 ===
On 23 May, he signed a three-year deal to join Penrith starting in the 2025 NRL season. Papali'i made 16 appearances for the Wests Tigers throughout the 2024 NRL season as the club finished with the Wooden Spoon for a third consecutive year.

=== 2025 ===
In round 1 of the 2025 NRL season, Papali'i made his club debut for Penrith in their 28-22 victory over Cronulla. He played 23 games for Penrith in the 2025 NRL season as the club finished 7th on the table. He played in Penrith's narrow preliminary final loss against Brisbane.

=== 2026 ===
Papali'i featured in 25 matches for Penrith in the 2026 NRL season as the club claimed the minor premiership. He played in the clubs shock preliminary final loss to Newcastle.

== Statistics ==
Year	Team	Games	Tries	Pts
2017	New Zealand Warriors	5	1	4
2018	New Zealand Warriors	20	3	12
2019	New Zealand Warriors	23	2	8
2020	New Zealand Warriors	15	1	4
2021	Parramatta Eels	25	7	28
2022	Parramatta Eels	28	10	40
2023	Wests Tigers	23	2	8
2024	Wests Tigers	16	5	20
2025	Penrith Panthers	23	7	28
2026	Penrith Panthers	4	1	4
2027	Penrith Panthers			
	Totals	182	39	156
