= Kiritapu Demant =

New Zealand rugby union player

- Born: 8 October 1996 (age 30) Whakatāne, New Zealand
- Height: 1.73 m (5 ft 8 in)
- Weight: 65 kg (143 lb)
- Notable relative: Ruahei Demant (sister)

Rugby union career
- Position: Utility Back
Provincial / State sides
Years	Team	Apps	(Points)
2013–2022	Auckland	43	(106)
Super Rugby
Years	Team	Apps	(Points)
2023	Blues Women	4	(0)
International career
Years	Team	Apps	(Points)
2015	New Zealand	2	(0)

Kiritapu Demant (born 8 October 1996) is a New Zealand rugby union player. She played two tests for the Black Ferns in 2015. She represented the Cook Islands at the 2017 Women's Rugby League World Cup in Australia. She played for the Blues Women in the Super Rugby Aupiki competition.

== Rugby career ==
=== Rugby union ===
Demant made her international debut for New Zealand at the 2015 Women's Rugby Super Series, on 27 June 2015 against Canada at Calgary.

Demant was named in the Tokyo Phoenix in 2016 and 2017 and lived in Tokyo, Japan while playing rugby sevens.

Demant was named in the Black Ferns squad that toured France and the United States in 2018 but did not get to play in any games. She was also named in the two-test series against Australia later that year.

At the end of 2019, Demant joined the Eibar Rugby Club in Spain for the 2020 Women’s club season. They went on to win the championship.

In November 2022, She joined the Blues Women for the 2023 Super Rugby Aupiki season.

=== Rugby league ===
Demant represented the Cook Islands at the 2017 Women's Rugby League World Cup in Australia. In 2018, she played for the Cook Islands in rugby league nines at the Rugby League Commonwealth Championship.

== Personal life ==
Demant's older sister, Ruahei, is also a Black Fern.
