= William Kennedy (rugby league, born 1997) =

Australian rugby league footballer

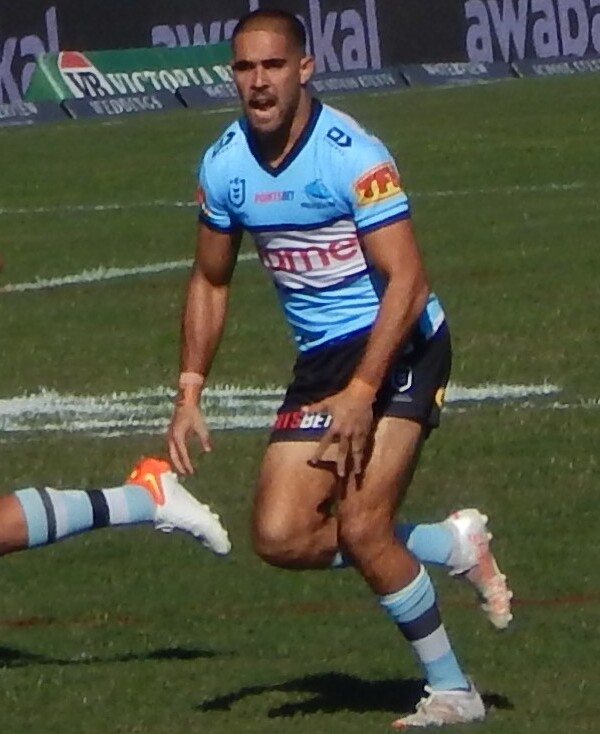

Personal information
- Full name: William Kennedy Jr
- Born: 18 April 1997 (age 29) Bathurst, New South Wales, Australia
- Height: 185 cm (6 ft 1 in)
- Weight: 92 kg (14 st 7 lb)

Playing information
- Position: Fullback
Club
| Years | Team | Pld | T | G | FG | P |
|---|---|---|---|---|---|---|
| 2019– | Cronulla Sharks | 160 | 62 | 0 | 0 | 248 |
Representative
| Years | Team | Pld | T | G | FG | P |
| 2022 | Indigenous All Stars | 1 | 0 | 0 | 0 | 0 |
- Source: As of 19 September 2026
- Father: William Kennedy
- Relatives: Kandy Kennedy (sister)

William Kennedy (born 18 April 1997) is an Australian professional rugby league footballer who plays as a fullback for the Cronulla-Sutherland Sharks in the National Rugby League (NRL).

== Background ==
Kennedy was born in Bathurst, in the Central Tablelands region of New South Wales, Australia. Kennedy Jr is the son of former Balmain Tigers player William 'Bubba' Kennedy.

== Playing career ==
=== 2019 ===
In round 6 of the 2019 NRL season, Kennedy made his NRL debut for Cronulla against the Penrith Panthers. Later in 2019, Kennedy played for Cronulla's feeder club Newtown where he was part of the squads which won the 2019 Canterbury Cup NSW premiership and 2019 NRL State Championship final.

=== 2021 ===
In round 1 of the 2021 NRL season, he scored two tries for Cronulla-Sutherland in a 32-18 victory over rivals St. George at Kogarah Oval. In round 4 of the 2021 NRL season, he scored two tries for Cronulla in a 48-10 victory over North Queensland at Kogarah Oval.

In round 20 of the 2021 NRL season, he scored two tries for Cronulla in their 22-40 loss against Manly in the "Battle of the Beaches" rivalry match.

In round 23 of the 2021 NRL season against the Wests Tigers, Kennedy scored two tries for Cronulla in a 50-20 victory.

Kennedy played 24 games for Cronulla and scored a total of 14 tries in the 2021 NRL season which saw the club narrowly miss the finals by finishing 9th on the table.

=== 2022 ===
In round 9 of the 2022 NRL season, Kennedy was sent off in the first half of Cronulla's match against the New Zealand Warriors for a dangerous high tackle. Cronulla would go on to win the match despite being down to 11 men at one point in the game. In the Qualifying Final, Kennedy scored two tries for Cronulla in a 32-30 loss against North Queensland. Kennedy played a total of 19 matches throughout the year scoring seven tries.

=== 2023 ===
In round 2 of the 2023 NRL season, Kennedy scored a hat-trick in Cronulla's 30-26 victory over Parramatta. In round 8, Kennedy scored his second hat-trick of the year in Cronulla's 33-20 victory over Canterbury. Kennedy played a total of 19 games for Cronulla in the 2023 NRL season and scored 14 tries as Cronulla finished sixth on the table.

=== 2024 ===
Kennedy played 26 games for Cronulla in the 2024 NRL season as the club finished 4th on the table and qualified for the finals. Kennedy played in all three of Cronulla's finals matches including their preliminary final loss against Penrith.

=== 2025 ===
Kennedy played 27 matches for Cronulla in the 2025 NRL season as the club finished 5th on the table. The club reached the preliminary final for a second consecutive season but lost against Melbourne 22-14. On 9 October 2025, the Sharks announced that Kennedy had signed with the club for a further year.

=== 2026 ===
On 4 June, Cronulla announced that Kennedy has re-signed for the 2027 season. Kennedy played 26 matches for Cronulla in the 2026 NRL season as the club finished 5th on the table and qualified for the finals.

== Statistics ==
=== NRL ===
*denotes season competing

| Season | Team | Matches | T | G | GK % | F/G | Pts |
|---|---|---|---|---|---|---|---|
| 2019 | Cronulla-Sutherland | 2 | 0 | 0 | — | 0 | 0 |
| 2020 | Cronulla-Sutherland | 17 | 3 | 0 | — | 0 | 12 |
| 2021 | Cronulla-Sutherland | 24 | 14 | 0 | — | 0 | 56 |
| 2022 | Cronulla-Sutherland | 19 | 7 | 0 | — | 0 | 28 |
| 2023 | Cronulla-Sutherland | 19 | 14 | 0 | — | 0 | 56 |
| 2024 | Cronulla-Sutherland | 26 | 5 | 0 | — | 0 | 20 |
| 2025 | Cronulla-Sutherland | 27 | 8 | 0 | — | 0 | 32 |
| 2026 | Cronulla-Sutherland | 26 | 11 | | | | 44 |
| Career totals | | 160 | 62 | 0 | — | 0 | 248 |

=== All Star ===
| Season | Team | Matches | T | G | GK % | F/G | Pts |
|---|---|---|---|---|---|---|---|
| 2022 | Indigenous All Stars | 1 | 0 | 0 | — | 0 | 0 |
| Career totals | | 1 | 0 | 0 | — | 0 | 0 |
