= Asipau Mafi =

Australian rugby league footballer (born 1993)

Personal information
- Born: 28 October 1993 (age 31); Brisbane, Queensland, Australia
- Height: 167 cm (5 ft 6 in)
- Weight: 95 kg (14 st 13 lb)

Playing information
- Position: Prop
Club
Years	Team	Pld	T	G	FG	P
2018	St George Illawarra	3	0	0	0	0
Representative
Years	Team	Pld	T	G	FG	P
2017	Queensland	1	0	0	0	0
2018–19	Prime Minister's XIII	2	1	0	0	4
- Source: RLP As of 3 November 2020

Asipau Mafi (born 28 October 1993) is an Australian rugby league footballer who plays for and captains the Wests Panthers in the QRL Women's Premiership.

Primarily a prop, she is a Queensland and Prime Minister's XIII representative and played for the St George Illawarra Dragons in the NRL Women's Premiership.

== Playing career ==
In 2012, Mafi began playing rugby league for the Aspley Devils. Prior to rugby league, she played Australian rules football.

In 2017, Mafi made her debut for Queensland in their 6–22 loss to New South Wales.

In June 2018, Mafi represented South East Queensland at the Women's National Championships. On 29 July 2018, she signed with the St George Illawarra Dragons NRL Women's Premiership team. In Round 1 of the 2018 NRL Women's season, she made her debut for the Dragons in their 4–30 loss to the Brisbane Broncos.

On 6 October 2018, she represented the Prime Minister's XIII, scoring a try in their 40–4 win over Papua New Guinea. On 11 October 2019, she again represented the Prime Minister's XIII, coming off the bench in a 22–14 win over Fiji.

In 2020, she captained the Wests Panthers in the inaugural season of the QRL Women's Premiership.
