= Melanie Howard =

Australian rugby league footballer

Personal information
- Born: 10 May 1993 (age 33) Gosford, New South Wales, Australia
- Height: 173 cm (5 ft 8 in)
- Weight: 68 kg (10 st 10 lb)

Playing information
- Position: Halfback, Five-eighth
Club
Years	Team	Pld	T	G	FG	P
2018	St George Illawarra	3	0	0	0	0
2019–24	Sydney Roosters	4	2	0	0	8
2025–	Leeds Rhinos	8	9	30	0	96
	Total	15	11	30	0	104
Representative
Years	Team	Pld	T	G	FG	P
2018	Prime Minister's XIII	1	0	0	0	0
2020	New South Wales	1	0	1	0	2
- Source: RLP As of 24 May 2026

Melanie Howard (born 10 May 1993) is an Australian rugby league footballer who plays for Leeds Rhinos in the RFL Women's Super League.

Primarily a halfback, she is a New South Wales and Prime Minister's XIII representative.

== Background ==
Born in Gosford, New South Wales, Howard played her junior rugby for the Northern Lakes Warriors.

== Playing career ==
=== St George Illawarra Dragons ===
In June 2018, Howard represented NSW Country at the inaugural Women's National Championships.

On 31 July 2018, she signed with the St George Illawarra Dragons in the NSWRL Women's Premiership.

In Round 1 of the 2018 NRL Women's season, she made her debut for the Dragons in a 4–30 loss to the Brisbane Broncos.

=== Sydney Roosters ===
On 26 June 2019, she joined the Sydney Roosters NRLW team.

On 25 October 2020, Howard started at five-eighth in the Roosters' 10–20 NRLW Grand Final loss to the Brisbane Broncos.

=== Leeds Rhinos ===
On 17 March 2025 it was reported that she had signed for Leeds Rhinos in the RFL Women's Super League

=== Representative ===
On 6 October 2018, she represented the Prime Minister's XIII in their 40–4 win over Papua New Guinea.

In May 2019, she represented NSW Country at the Women's National Championships.

On 13 November 2020, she made her State of Origin debut for New South Wales in their 18–24 loss to Queensland.
