= Chloe Caldwell =

Australian rugby league footballer

Personal information
- Born: 29 June 1988 (age 37) Sydney, New South Wales, Australia
- Height: 176 cm (5 ft 9 in)
- Weight: 100 kg (15 st 10 lb)

Playing information
- Position: Prop
Club
Years	Team	Pld	T	G	FG	P
2018	Sydney Roosters	2	0	0	0	0
Representative
Years	Team	Pld	T	G	FG	P
2005–10	New South Wales	3	0	0	0	0
2010	Australia	1	0	0	0	0
2011–15	Indigenous All Stars	3	0	0	0	0
- Source: RLP As of 11 October 2020

Chloe Caldwell (born 29 June 1988) is an Australian rugby league footballer who played for the Sydney Roosters in the NRL Women's Premiership.

Primarily a prop, she has represented Australia, New South Wales and the Indigenous All Stars.

== Playing career ==
In 2005 and 2006, while playing for the Redfern All Blacks, Caldwell represented New South Wales. In 2010, she represented both Australia and New South Wales.

In 2011, Caldwell represented the Indigenous All Stars in the inaugural women's NRL All Stars game.

In May 2018, while playing for the South Sydney Rabbitohs in the NSWRL Women's Premiership, Caldwell represented NSW City at the Women's National Championships.

In September 2018, Caldwell joined the Sydney Roosters NRL Women's Premiership team. In Round 1 of the 2018 NRL Women's season, she made her debut for the Roosters in their 4–10 loss to the New Zealand Warriors.
