= Talesha Quinn =

Australia international rugby league footballer (b.1989)

Personal information
- Born: 13 June 1989 (age 36) Parkes, New South Wales, Australia
- Height: 178 cm (5 ft 10 in)
- Weight: 76 kg (12 st 0 lb)

Playing information
- Position: Second-row
Club
Years	Team	Pld	T	G	FG	P
2018	St George Illawarra Dragons	2	0	0	0	0
2023–	Parramatta Eels	9	0	0	0	0
	Total	11	0	0	0	0
Representative
Years	Team	Pld	T	G	FG	P
2012–18	New South Wales	3	0	0	0	0
2013	Women's All Stars	1	0	0	0	0
2017	Australia	4	3	0	0	12
2018–19	Prime Minister's XIII	1	0	0	0	4
- Source: RLP As of 2 November 2023

Talesha Quinn (born 13 June 1989) is an Australian rugby league footballer who plays for the Parramatta Eels in the NRLW.

Primarily a second-row, she is an Australia and New South Wales representative and previously played for the St George Illawarra Dragons in the NRL Women's Premiership.

== Background ==
Born in Parkes, New South Wales, Quinn began playing rugby league in 2011 for the Berkeley Eagles.

== Playing career ==
In 2012, Quinn represented New South Wales in a 10–34 loss to Queensland.

In 2013, Quinn moved to Townsville, Queensland due to work commitments. That year, she represented the Women's All Stars.

In 2017, Quinn returned to New South Wales and joined the Cronulla-Sutherland Sharks in the NSWRL Women's Premiership. In October 2017, she made her Test debut for Australia at the 2017 Women's Rugby League World Cup.

In June 2018, she represented the Australian Defence Force at the Women's National Championships. On 5 June 2018, Quinn was announced as one of the inaugural signings for the St George Illawarra Dragons NRL Women's Premiership team.

In Round 2 of the 2018 NRL Women's season, Quinn made her debut for the Dragons in a 22–10 win over the New Zealand Warriors. On 6 October 2018, she represented the Prime Minister's XIII in their 40–4 win over Papua New Guinea.
