= Alice Vailea =

Tonga international rugby league footballer

Personal information
- Born: 30 January 1996 (age 30) Auckland, New Zealand
- Height: 164 cm (5 ft 5 in)
- Weight: 88 kg (13 st 12 lb)

Playing information
- Position: Second-row
Club
Years	Team	Pld	T	G	FG	P
2018	New Zealand Warriors	3	0	0	0	0
Representative
Years	Team	Pld	T	G	FG	P
2020	Tonga	1	1	0	0	4
- Source: RLP As of 24 May 2026

Alice Vailea (born 30 January 1996) is a New Zealand rugby league footballer who played as second-row for the New Zealand Warriors in the NRL Women's Premiership.

== Playing career ==
In 2016, Vailea represented the Akarana Falcons while playing for the Bay Roskill Vikings.

In June 2018, while playing for the Richmond Roses, she was named in the New Zealand train-on squad. That year, she was named the Auckland Rugby League Women's Player of the Year.

On 1 August 2018, she was announced as a member of the inaugural New Zealand Warriors NRL Women's Premiership squad.

In Round 1 of the 2018 NRL Women's season, she made her debut for the Warriors, starting at second-row in their 10–4 win over the Sydney Roosters.
