= Onjeurlina Leiataua =

New Zealand & Samoa international rugby league footballer

Personal information
- Born: 1 December 1995 (age 30) Auckland, New Zealand
- Height: 160 cm (5 ft 3 in)
- Weight: 88 kg (13 st 12 lb)

Playing information
- Position: Second-row, Centre
Club
Years	Team	Pld	T	G	FG	P
2018–19	New Zealand Warriors	6	1	0	0	4
2022–26	Ōtāhuhu Leopards	35	29	0	0	116
	Total	41	30	0	0	120
Representative
Years	Team	Pld	T	G	FG	P
2018–19	New Zealand	2	0	0	0	0
2019	New Zealand 9s	4	0	1	0	2
2020	Samoa	2	0	0	0	0
2023	Auckland	1	0	0	0	0
- Source: RLP As of 15 June 2023

Onjeurlina Leiataua (born 1 December 1995) is a New Zealand rugby league footballer who played for the New Zealand Warriors in the NRL Women's Premiership. Primarily a second-rower, she is a New Zealand & Samoa representative.

== Playing career ==
Leiataua played for the Auckland Rugby Union team from 2012 to 2017 before switching to rugby league in 2018.

Leiataua was only 17 when she made her only appearance for the Black Ferns on 20 July 2013 against England at Pukekohe.

In 2018, while playing for the Otahuhu Leopards, she represented Counties Manukau at the NZRL National Women's Competition. On 1 August 2018, Leiataua joined the New Zealand Warriors NRL Women's Premiership side. In Round 1 of the 2018 NRL Women's season, she made her debut for the Warriors in their 10–4 win over the Sydney Roosters.

On 13 October 2018, she made her Test debut for New Zealand, starting at second-row in their 24–26 loss to Australia. On 12 December 2018, she was named the Kiwi Ferns Rookie of the Year at the NZRL Awards.

On 19 October 2019, Leiataua was a member of New Zealand's 2019 Rugby League World Cup 9s-winning team. On 25 October 2019, she started at second-row in New Zealand's 8–28 Test loss to Australia.
