= Tanika-Jazz Noble-Bell =

New Zealand rugby league footballer

Personal information
- Born: 20 February 1996 (age 29) Auckland, New Zealand
- Height: 173 cm (5 ft 8 in)
- Weight: 90 kg (14 st 2 lb)

Playing information
- Position: Prop
Club
| Years | Team | Pld | T | G | FG | P |
|---|---|---|---|---|---|---|
| 2018–19 | New Zealand Warriors | 4 | 0 | 0 | 0 | 0 |
Representative
| Years | Team | Pld | T | G | FG | P |
| 2020 | Māori All Stars | 1 | 0 | 0 | 0 | 0 |
| 2023 | Auckland | 1 | 0 | 0 | 0 | 0 |
- Source: RLP As of 9 November 2020

Tanika-Jazz Noble-Bell (born 20 February 1996) is a New Zealand rugby league footballer who played for the New Zealand Warriors in the NRL Women's Premiership.

== Background ==
Born in Auckland, Noble-Bell played basketball until she was 17 before switching to rugby league.

== Playing career ==
In 2018, while playing for the Manurewa Marlins, Noble-Bell was named in the New Zealand train-on squad.

On 1 August 2018, she was announced as a member of the New Zealand Warriors NRL Women's Premiership team. In Round 1 of the 2018 NRL Women's season, she made her debut for the Warriors in a 10–4 win over the Sydney Roosters.

On 22 February 2020, she represented the Māori All Stars in their 4–10 loss to the Indigenous All Stars.
