= Oneata Schwalger =

Australia international rugby union & league footballer

Personal information
- Born: 4 July 1985 (age 40) Apia, Samoa
- Height: 175 cm (5 ft 9 in)
- Weight: 89 kg (14 st 0 lb)

Playing information

Rugby league
- Position: Prop
Club
Years	Team	Pld	T	G	FG	P
2018	St George Illawarra	3	0	0	0	0
Representative
Years	Team	Pld	T	G	FG	P
2015	Women's All Stars	1	0	0	0	0

Rugby union
- Position: Prop
Club
Years	Team	Pld	T	G	FG	P
2020	NSW Waratahs	4	0	0	0	0
Representative
Years	Team	Pld	T	G	FG	P
2014	Australia
- Source: RLP As of 16 November 2020

Oneata Schwalger (born 4 July 1985) is an Australian rugby union and rugby league footballer who plays for the New South Wales Waratahs in the Super W. Primarily a prop, she is an Australia international and previously played for the St George Illawarra Dragons in the NRL Women's Premiership.

== Background ==
Born in Apia, Samoa, Schwalger was raised in Porirua, New Zealand. In Porirua, she played rugby union for Norths and rugby league for the Porirua Vikings. Her brother John is a former All Black and her cousin, Tim Lafai, is a Samoan rugby league international.

== Playing career ==
=== Rugby union ===
In 2007, Schwalger moved to Australia and played rugby union, first in Perth and later in Melbourne. In Melbourne, she played for the Melbourne Unicorns.

In 2014, Schwalger represented Australia at the 2014 Women's Rugby World Cup in France.

In 2020, she played for the NSW Waratahs in the Super W competition.

=== Rugby league ===
In 2015, Schwalger represented the Women's All Stars against the Indigenous All Stars, becoming the first player based outside of Queensland and New South Wales to play for the side.

In 2017, she joined the Cronulla-Sutherland Sharks NSWRL Women's Premiership team and was selected in the Australian train-on squad.

In 2018 and 2019, she represented the Combined Affiliated States at the Women's National Championships.

On 13 June 2018, she signed with the St George Illawarra Dragons NRL Women's Premiership team. In Round 1 of the 2018 NRL Women's season, she made her debut for the Dragons in a 4–30 loss to the Brisbane Broncos.
