= Rikeya Horne =

Australian rugby league footballer (born 1999)

Personal information
- Born: 14 September 1999 (age 27) Shellharbour, New South Wales, Australia

Playing information
- Position: Wing, Fullback, Centre
Club
Years	Team	Pld	T	G	FG	P
2018–20	St. George Illawarra	7	1	0	0	4
2021–22	Parramatta Eels	11	3	0	0	12
2023–	Wests Tigers	19	6	0	0	24
	Total	37	10	0	0	40
Representative
Years	Team	Pld	T	G	FG	P
2018	Prime Minister's XIII	1	0	0	0	0
- Source: As of 16 November 2026

Rikeya Horne (born 14 September 1999) is an Australian rugby league footballer who played for the Wests Tigers in the NRL Women's Premiership and the St Marys Saints in the NSWRL Women's Premiership Primarily a winger or centre , she is a Prime Minister's XIII representative and she is currently a mother with twins.

Horne previously played for the St George Illawarra Dragons and Parramatta Eels.

== Background ==
Born in Shellharbour, New South Wales, Horne played her junior rugby league for the Corrimal Cougars.

== Playing career ==
On 27 August 2016, Horne played for the St George Illawarra Dragons in an exhibition nines game against the Cronulla-Sutherland Sharks. In 2017, Horne played for the Illawarra Steelers in the Tarsha Gale Cup, scoring six tries.

=== 2018 ===
In February, Horne was a member of Australia's 2018 Rugby League Commonwealth Championship gold medal-winning side. In June 2018, she represented NSW Country at the Women's National Championships. On 13 June, she signed with the St George Illawarra Dragons inaugural NRL Women's Premiership team.

In Round 1 of the 2018 NRL Women's season, Horne made her debut for the Dragons in their 4–30 loss to the Brisbane Broncos. On 6 October, Horne started at fullback for the Prime Minister's XIII in their win over Papua New Guinea.

=== 2019 ===
In May, Horne represented NSW Country at the Women's National Championships. On 6 October, Horne started on the wing in the Dragons' 6–30 Grand Final loss to the Broncos.

=== 2020 ===
In 2020, Horne joined the Canterbury-Bankstown Bulldogs NSWRL Women's Premiership team. She played just one game for the Dragons in the 2020 NRL Women's season, starting at centre in their 10–22 loss to the New Zealand Warriors.
