= Langi Veainu =

New Zealand & Tonga international rugby league & union footballer

Personal information
- Born: 3 November 1993 (age 31); Kawakawa, New Zealand
- Height: 169 cm (5 ft 7 in)
- Weight: 72 kg (11 st 5 lb)

Playing information

Rugby league
- Position: Wing, Centre
Club
| Years | Team | Pld | T | G | FG | P |
|---|---|---|---|---|---|---|
| 2018 | New Zealand Warriors | 3 | 0 | 0 | 0 | 0 |
Representative
| Years | Team | Pld | T | G | FG | P |
| 2016–18 | New Zealand | 3 | 2 | 0 | 0 | 8 |
| 2023 | Tonga | 1 | 0 | 0 | 0 | 0 |

Rugby union
- Position: Flanker
Club
| Years | Team | Pld | T | G | FG | P |
|---|---|---|---|---|---|---|
| 2021–2022 | Chiefs Manawa | 3 | 2 | 0 | 0 | 10 |
Representative
| Years | Team | Pld | T | G | FG | P |
| 2020–2020 | New Zealand | 1 | 2 | 0 | 0 | 10 |
- Source: RLP As of 3 November 2023

Langi Veainu (born 3 November 1993) is a New Zealand rugby league and rugby union footballer. She previously played for the New Zealand Warriors in the NRL Women's Premiership and has represented New Zealand in both codes.

== Background ==
Born in Kawakawa, Veainu grew up in Christchurch before moving to Auckland with her family following the 2011 Christchurch earthquake.

Her older brother, Telusa, is a Tonga rugby union international.

== Playing career ==
=== Rugby league ===
In 2016, while playing for the Papakura Sisters, Veainu represented Counties Manukau. On 6 May 2016, she made her Test debut for New Zealand, starting on the wing in their 26–16 win over Australia in Newcastle.

On 5 May 2017, she started on the wing for New Zealand in a 4–16 loss to Australia in Canberra.

On 1 August 2018, she was announced as a member of the New Zealand Warriors NRL Women's Premiership squad. In Round 1 of the 2018 NRL Women's season, she made her debut for the Warriors in a 10–4 win over the Sydney Roosters.

On 13 October 2018, she started on the wing and scored two tries for New Zealand in a 24–26 loss to Australia in Auckland.

=== Rugby union ===
In 2014, Veainu began playing for Counties Manukau in the Farah Palmer Cup.

In November 2019, she played for the Black Ferns Development XV at the Oceania Rugby Women's Championship in Lautoka, Fiji. She scored a try in their group game against Australia A and two against Papua New Guinea.

On 14 November 2020, she made her debut for the Black Ferns, scoring two tries in a 34–15 win over the New Zealand Barbarians in West Auckland.
