= Luisa Gago =

New Zealand rugby league footballer

Personal information
- Born: 8 November 1993 (age 31); Auckland, New Zealand
- Height: 159 cm (5 ft 3 in)
- Weight: 69 kg (10 st 12 lb)

Playing information
- Position: Lock
Club
Years	Team	Pld	T	G	FG	P
2018	New Zealand Warriors	3	1	0	0	4
Representative
Years	Team	Pld	T	G	FG	P
2017	New Zealand	2	1	0	0	4
2019	Samoa	1	0	0	0	0
- Source: RLP As of 13 October 2020

Luisa Gago (born 8 November 1993) is a New Zealand rugby league footballer who played for the New Zealand Warriors in the NRL Women's Premiership.

Primarily a lock, she has represented New Zealand and Samoa.

== Playing career ==
A fullback as a junior, Gago transitioned into the forwards after a number of injuries.

In 2017, while playing for the Manurewa Marlins, she was selected in the New Zealand squad for the 2017 Women's Rugby League World Cup, playing two games.

In August 2018, Gago joined the New Zealand Warriors NRL Women's Premiership team. In Round 1 of the 2018 NRL Women's season, she made her debut in the Warriors' 10–4 win over the Sydney Roosters, scoring a try.

On 22 June 2019, she captained Samoa in their first Test match in eight years, a 8–46 loss to New Zealand at Mt Smart Stadium.
