= Kate Haren =

Australian rugby league player

Personal information
- Born: 3 November 1985 (age 41) Innisfail, Queensland, Australia

Playing information
- Position: Lock, Second-row
Club
| Years | Team | Pld | T | G | FG | P |
|---|---|---|---|---|---|---|
| 2018 | St George Illawarra Dragons | 2 | 0 | 0 | 0 | 0 |
Representative
| Years | Team | Pld | T | G | FG | P |
| 2009–12 | Queensland | 2 | 0 | 0 | 0 | 0 |
- Source: RLP As of 18 October 2020

Kate Haren (born 3 November 1985) is an Australian former rugby league footballer from the 2000s and 2010s.

A lock or second-rower, she represented Queensland and played for the St George Illawarra Dragons in the NRL Women's Premiership

== Playing career ==
In 2008, Haren began playing rugby league for the Innisfail Leprechauns. Before playing rugby league, she was a national and state champion BMX rider.

In 2009, she made her debut for Queensland in their win over New South Wales. In 2012, she played her second game for Queensland before retiring at the end of that season.

In 2017, Haren returned to rugby league, training with the Innisfail Leprechauns men's team during the week and travelling to Brisbane on weekends to play for the Wests Panthers. On 23 July 2017, she was 18th player for Queensland.

In June 2018, she represented Queensland Country at the inaugural Women's National Championships. On 30 July 2018, she signed with the St George Illawarra Dragons for the inaugural season of the NRL Women's Premiership.

In Round 2 of the 2018 NRL Women's season, she made her debut for the Dragons, coming off the bench in a 22–10 win over the New Zealand Warriors.

On 3 August 2019, Haren stated at second-row in Wests Panthers' 20–8 SEQ Women's Division 1 Grand Final win over the Burleigh Bears, the Panthers first-ever women's premiership win. Haren announced her retirement following the game.
