= Anneka Stephens =

Cook Islands international rugby league footballer

Personal information
- Full name: Anneka Taia-Stephens
- Born: 4 September 1989 (age 36) Invercargill, Southland Region, New Zealand

Playing information

Rugby union
Club
Years	Team	Pld	T	G	FG	P
	Western Force
Representative
Years	Team	Pld	T	G	FG	P
2016	Cook Islands 7s

Rugby league
- Position: Hooker
Club
Years	Team	Pld	T	G	FG	P
2018	St George Illawarra	3	0	0	0	0
Representative
Years	Team	Pld	T	G	FG	P
2022–	Cook Islands	4	0	0	0	0
- Source: RLP As of 3 November 2023

Anneka Stephens (born 4 September 1989) is a New Zealand rugby league footballer who played for the St. George Illawarra Dragons in the NRL Women's Premiership. She has represented Cook Islands in rugby sevens.

== Background ==
Stephens was born in Invercargill, where she played touch football and rugby union before moving to Perth, Western Australia.

== Playing career ==
=== Rugby league ===
In Perth, Stephens played rugby league for the Joondalup Giants in the women's NRLWA competition.

In June 2018, Stephens represented the Combined Affiliated States at the Women's National Championships. On 27 June 2018, she signed with the St. George Illawarra Dragons in the NRL Women's Premiership.

In Round 1 of the 2018 NRL Women's season, she made her debut for the Dragons, starting at hooker in their 4–30 loss to the Brisbane Broncos. She played all three games for the Dragons in 2018, starting all of them at hooker.

=== Rugby sevens ===
In 2016, she represented the Cook Islands at the 2016 Rugby World Women's Sevens Olympic Repechage Tournament in Dublin.
