= Aieshaleigh Smalley =

NZ & Samoa women's international rugby league footballer

Personal information
- Born: 23 September 1991 (age 34) Auckland, New Zealand
- Height: 165 cm (5 ft 5 in)
- Weight: 96 kg (15 st 2 lb)

Playing information
- Position: Prop
Club
Years	Team	Pld	T	G	FG	P
2018–19	New Zealand Warriors	5	1	0	0	4
Representative
Years	Team	Pld	T	G	FG	P
2017–19	New Zealand	5	0	0	0	0
2020	Samoa	1	0	0	0	0
- Source: RLP As of 24 May 2026

Aieshaleigh Smalley (born 23 September 1991) is a New Zealand rugby league footballer who last played for the New Zealand Warriors in the NRL Women's Premiership. Primarily a prop, she is both a New Zealand and Samoa international.

== Background ==
Born in Auckland, Smalley began playing rugby league as a teenager for the Manukau Rovers.

== Playing career ==
In 2017, while playing for the Otahuhu Leopards, Smalley was selected in the New Zealand squad for the 2017 Women's Rugby League World Cup.

On 2 December 2017, she started at prop in New Zealand's 16–23 final loss to Australia.

On 1 August 2018, Smalley was announced as a member of the New Zealand Warriors NRL Women's Premiership team.

In Round 1 of the 2018 NRL Women's season, she made her debut for the Warriors in a 10–4 win over the Sydney Roosters.
