= Lisa Edwards (rugby league) =

New Zealand rugby league footballer

Personal information
- Born: 19 October 1992 (age 32); Auckland, New Zealand
- Height: 164 cm (5 ft 5 in)
- Weight: 68 kg (10 st 10 lb)

Playing information
- Position: Wing
Club
Years	Team	Pld	T	G	FG	P
2018	New Zealand Warriors	1	0	0	0	0
2022–23	Howick Hornets	25	14	0	0	56
2024	Papakura Sea Eagles	1	2	0	0	8
	Total	27	16	0	0	64
- As of 8 June 2024

Lisa Edwards (born 19 October 1992) is a New Zealand rugby league footballer who played for the New Zealand Warriors in the NRL Women's Premiership. She primarily plays as a winger.

== Playing career ==
In June 2018, while playing for the Mt Albert Lions, Edwards was selected for the New Zealand wider squad. In August 2018, Edwards joined the New Zealand Warriors NRL Women's Premiership team.

In Round 2 of the 2018 NRL Women's season, Edwards made her debut for the Warriors in a 10–22 loss to the St George Illawarra Dragons.

On 22 October 2018, Edwards was named in the New Zealand Māori Ferns train on squad following the National Māori Tournament.

In 2019, she played for the Auckland Vulcans at the National Women's Tournament.

She captained the Papakura Sea Eagles Womens Team in the Auckland Rugby League competition. Who took out the Auckland Rugby League Women's Premiership Competition 2024.
