= Karley Te Kawa =

New Zealand rugby league footballer

Personal information
- Born: Auckland, New Zealand

Playing information
- Position: Wing, Centre
Club
Years	Team	Pld	T	G	FG	P
2018	Brisbane Broncos	2	1	0	0	4
2022	Manurewa Marlins		2	0	0	8
	Total	2	3	0	0	12
Representative
Years	Team	Pld	T	G	FG	P
2010–18	New Zealand	5	5	0	0	20
2022	Counties Manukau Stingrays	3	0	0	0	0
- Source: RLP As of 26 November 2020

Karley Te Kawa is a New Zealand rugby league footballer who played for the Brisbane Broncos Women in the NRL Women's Premiership.

A wing or centre, she is a New Zealand representative.

== Background ==
Born in Auckland, Te Kawa attended Papakura High School and played junior rugby league for the Papakura Sea Eagles.

== Playing career ==
In October 2010, Te Kawa made her debut for New Zealand in their two-game series against England, scoring a try in their first Test win at Toll Stadium.

In 2011 and 2012, Te Kawa played rugby union for Manurewa and represented Auckland in the Farah Palmer Cup.

In 2013, she represented New Zealand at the 2013 Women's Rugby League World Cup. She scored a hat-trick in their 88–0 win over France. On 14 July 2013, she started on the wing in New Zealand's 12–22 final loss to Australia.

On 20 July 2018, Te Kawa signed with the Brisbane Broncos NRL Women's Premiership team. In Round 2 of the 2018 NRL Women's season, she made her debut for the Broncos in their 14–4 win over the Sydney Roosters.

On 13 October 2018, she started on the wing for New Zealand in their 24–26 loss to Australia at Mt Smart Stadium.
