= Lorina Papali'i =

Former New Zealand rugby league and rugby union footballer

Personal information
- Full name: Lorina Cecilia Papali'i
- Born: 16 January 1977 (age 49) Hamilton, New Zealand
- Height: 160 cm (5 ft 3 in)
- Weight: 78 kg (12 st 4 lb)

Playing information

Rugby league
- Position: Second-row
Club
Years	Team	Pld	T	G	FG	P
2018	New Zealand Warriors	3	0	0	0	0
Representative
Years	Team	Pld	T	G	FG	P
1994–05	New Zealand	9	1	0	0	4

Rugby union
Representative
Years	Team	Pld	T	G	FG	P
2002–06	Samoa	3
- Source: RLP As of 9 November 2020
- Relatives: Isaiah Papali'i (son)

Lorina Papali'i (née Buckley; born 16 January 1977) is a former New Zealand rugby league and rugby union footballer from the 1990s, 2000s and 2010s.

A dual international, she represented New Zealand in rugby league and Samoa in rugby union.

== Background ==
Born in Hamilton, New Zealand, Papali'i went to school in Newcastle, New South Wales before returning to New Zealand. Her son, Isaiah, is a New Zealand and Samoan rugby league international.

== Playing career ==
=== Rugby league ===
In 1994, Papali'i made her Test debut for New Zealand while playing for the Richmond Rovers. She was later a member of New Zealand's successful 2000 and 2003 Women's Rugby League World Cup squads.

Papali'i enjoyed a long career with Richmond, winning the club's Player of the Year award four times (1996, 1997, 2001, 2002) and Forward of the Year award three times (1994, 1995, 2003). In 2002, she won the New Zealand Women's Nationals Player of the Tournament and in 2004 won the NZRL Player of the Year. In 2010, she retired from rugby.

On 1 August 2018, Papali'i came out of retirement and was named in the New Zealand Warriors NRL Women's Premiership squad.

In Round 1 of the 2018 NRL Women's season, she made her debut for the Warriors in a 10–4 win over the Sydney Roosters. In doing so, Papali'i and her son Isaiah (who played for the Warriors' men's team) became the first mother and son to play for the same club.

=== Rugby union ===
In 2002 and 2006, Papali'i represented Samoa at the Rugby World Cup.
