= Shontelle Stowers =

New Zealand rugby league footballer

Personal information
- Born: 14 November 1986 (age 40) Tokoroa, New Zealand
- Height: 168 cm (5 ft 6 in)
- Weight: 68 kg (10 st 10 lb)

Playing information

Rugby union
Club
Years	Team	Pld	T	G	FG	P
	Warringah Rats
Representative
Years	Team	Pld	T	G	FG	P
	Australia
	Australia 7s

Rugby league
- Position: Centre
Club
Years	Team	Pld	T	G	FG	P
2018–19	Sydney Roosters	6	0	0	0	0
2020	New Zealand Warriors	2	0	0	0	0
2022	St. George Illawarra Dragons	2	0	0	0	0
2023–	Parramatta Eels	2	0	0	0	0
	Total	12	0	0	0	0
Representative
Years	Team	Pld	T	G	FG	P
2019	New South Wales	1	0	0	0	0
	Samoa
- Source: As of 2 November 2023

Shontelle Stowers (born 14 November 1986) is a New Zealand-born Australian rugby union and rugby league who plays for the Parramatta Eels in the NRLW and the North Sydney Bears in the NSWRL Women's Premiership.

She has played representative level rugby union for Australia and Australia sevens and at club level for Warringah Rats, and representative level rugby league for Samoa and NSW City, and at club level for Cronulla-Caringbah, and in the NRL Women's Premiership for the Sydney Roosters Women, usually as a centre.

== Playing career ==
Stowers moved to Australia at the age of 21 and played rugby union for the Warringah Rats. While with the club she represented the Australian rugby sevens side and the Australia.

In 2017, she switched to rugby league and played for Cronulla-Caringbah. In 2018, she was selected for the NSW City side for the National Championships.

In February 2018, Stowers represented Samoa at the 2018 Rugby League Commonwealth Championship.

On 17 June 2018, Stowers signed for the Sydney Roosters as one of their 15 marquee signings.

In Round 1 of the 2018 NRL Women's Premiership, Stowers made her debut for the Sydney Roosters, starting at centre in their 10–4 loss to the New Zealand Warriors.

In May 2019, she represented NSW City at the 2019 Women's National Championships. On 8 June, she was named to make her debut for the New South Wales State of Origin team.

In 2020, Stowers joined the New Zealand Warriors, playing two games for the club that season.
