= Lavina O'Mealey =

Australia international rugby league footballer

Personal information
- Born: 24 March 1984 (age 41); Sydney, New South Wales, Australia
- Height: 167 cm (5 ft 6 in)
- Weight: 73 kg (11 st 7 lb)

Playing information
- Position: Five-eighth
Club
Years	Team	Pld	T	G	FG	P
2018	Sydney Roosters	4	1	0	0	4
Representative
Years	Team	Pld	T	G	FG	P
2011–18	New South Wales	3	0	0	0	0
2017–4	Australia	1	0	0	0	4
- Source: As of 11 September 2018

Lavina O'Mealey (born 26 March 1984) is an Australian international rugby league player who plays Glebe Dirty Reds in the NSWRL Women's Premiership.

== Playing career ==
O'Mealey began playing rugby league in 2009 for the Redfern All Blacks and in 2011 represented New South Wales.

In 2017, she was a member of the Jillaroos 2017 Women's Rugby League World Cup winning side, coming off the interchange in the final against New Zealand. In 2018, she played for the NSW City at the National Women's Championships.

In June 2018, O'Mealey was announced as one of the fifteen marquee signings by the Sydney Roosters women's team.

In Round 1 of the 2018 NRL Women's Premiership, O'Mealey made her debut for the Sydney Roosters, starting at five-eighth in their 10–4 loss to the New Zealand Warriors.

In 2021, she joined the Glebe Dirty Reds for their inaugural season in the NSWRL Women's Premiership.
