= Lavinia Gould =

NZ international rugby union & league player (born 1983)

Personal information
- Born: 15 March 1981 (age 45) Whakatāne, New Zealand
- Height: 162 cm (5 ft 4 in)
- Weight: 66 kg (10 st 6 lb)

Playing information

Rugby league
- Position: Hooker, Lock
Club
Years	Team	Pld	T	G	FG	P
2018–24	Brisbane Broncos	30	3	0	0	12

Rugby union
- Position: Flyhalf, Inside centre, Flanker
Club
Years	Team	Pld	T	G	FG	P
2018–19	Queensland Reds	15	3	13	0	44
Representative
Years	Team	Pld	T	G	FG	P
2000–15	New Zealand 7s
	New Zealand
- Source: RLP As of 10 March 2022

Lavinia Gould (born 15 March 1983) is a New Zealand rugby league footballer who plays for the Brisbane Broncos in the NRL Women's Premiership.

A hooker in rugby league and a flyhalf in rugby union, she is a former New Zealand and New Zealand sevens representative and previously played for the Queensland Reds in the Super W.

== Playing career ==
=== Rugby union ===
Born in Whakatāne, Gould played provincial rugby union for Bay of Plenty and Wellington. In 2000, at 17-years old, she was a member of the first official New Zealand women's sevens team, who took part in the 2000 Hong Kong Sevens.

On 9 November 2013, she was suspended for two years by the IRB following a positive drug test after the 2012 Dubai Women's Sevens. Gould tested positive for methylhexaneamine (MHA), which was found in a dietary supplement she used during the tournament.

In May 2015, she returned from her ban and represented the New Zealand sevens team at the 2014–15 World Rugby Women's Sevens Series.

In 2018, Gould joined the Queensland Reds in the Super W competition. On 20 April 2018, she was named Player of the Final in the Reds' 13–16 loss to the New South Wales Waratahs.

=== Rugby league ===
On 10 August 2018, Gould signed with the Brisbane Broncos NRL Women's Premiership team. On 3 September 2018, she played her first game of rugby league in the Broncos' pre-season trial win over Papua New Guinea.

In Round 1 of the 2018 NRL Women's season, she made her debut for the Broncos' in their 30–4 win over the St George Illawarra Dragons. On 30 September 2018, she came off the bench and scored a try in the Broncos' 34–12 Grand Final win over the Sydney Roosters. On 12 October 2018, she was named in the New Zealand squad for their Test match against Australian Jillaroos but did not play.

In 2019, she joined the Wests Panthers in the QRL Women's Premiership. In June 2019, she was 19th player for the Queensland State of Origin team. On 6 October 2019, she started at hooker and scored a try in the Broncos' 30–6 Grand Final win over the Dragons. On 11 October 2019, she was named in New Zealand's Test team but later withdrew for personal reasons.

In 2020, Gould played the first two games of the 2020 NRL Women's season for the Broncos. She suffered a leg injury in their Round 2 win over the St George Illawarra Dragons, forcing her to miss the rest of the season and, subsequently, the club's Grand Final win over the Roosters.

In 2023, Gould's daughter suffered complications during heart surgery and was put in a medically induced coma. Gould took leave from the Broncos during the 2023 NRL Women's season to support her daughter.
