= Taleena Simon =

Australian rugby league footballer

Personal information
- Born: 18 December 1992 (age 32) Camperdown, New South Wales, Australia
- Height: 167 cm (5 ft 6 in)
- Weight: 67 kg (10 st 8 lb)

Playing information
- Position: Wing, Centre, Fullback
Club
Years	Team	Pld	T	G	FG	P
2018–	Sydney Roosters	5	5	0	0	20
Representative
Years	Team	Pld	T	G	FG	P
2018	New South Wales	1	0	0	0	0
2012–21	Indigenous All Stars	2	0	0	0	0
- Source: As of 11 September 2018
Medals
Women's rugby sevens
Representing Australia
Pacific Games
Silver medal – second place	2015 Port Moresby	Team competition

Taleena Simon (born 18 December 1992) is an Australian rugby league footballer who plays for the Sydney Roosters in the NRL Women's Premiership and the Glebe Dirty Reds in the NSWRL Women's Premiership.

== Playing career ==
A Redfern All Blacks junior, Simon made her senior debut for the Guildford Owls in 2010.

Following a shoulder injury, Simon switched codes to rugby union and joined the Australia women's national rugby sevens team in 2014, becoming the first Aboriginal woman to sign a full time professional contract with the program.

In 2017, she returned to Rugby League, playing for the Redfern All Blacks in the Harvey Norman NSW Women's Premiership. In 2018, she played for the South Sydney Rabbitohs in the Harvey Norman NSW Women's Premiership, taking out leading try-scorer for the season. She has also represented NSW City at the National Women's Championships on the Gold Coast.

On 17 June 2018, Simon signed for the Sydney Roosters as one of their 15 marquee signings.

On 22 June 2018, Simon made her Origin debut for New South Wales in their 16–10 win over Queensland.

In Round 1 of the 2018 NRL Women's Premiership, Simon made her debut for the Sydney Roosters, starting on the wing in their 10–4 loss to the New Zealand Warriors.

On 20 February 2021, Simon represented the Indigenous All Stars in their 24–0 loss to the Māori All Stars. In 2021, she joined the Glebe Dirty Reds for their inaugural season in the NSWRL Women's Premiership.
