= Ngatokotoru Arakua =

New Zealand and Cook Islands women's international rugby league footballer (born 1997)

Personal information
- Born: 13 May 1997 (age 29) Mauke, Cook Islands
- Height: 165 cm (5 ft 5 in)
- Weight: 93 kg (14 st 9 lb)

Playing information
- Position: Prop
Club
| Years | Team | Pld | T | G | FG | P |
|---|---|---|---|---|---|---|
| 2018 | Brisbane Broncos | 4 | 2 | 0 | 0 | 8 |
| 2019 | St George Illawarra | 4 | 0 | 0 | 0 | 0 |
| 2021 | Newcastle Knights | 2 | 0 | 0 | 0 | 0 |
| 2023 | Manurewa Marlins | 2 | 2 | 0 | 0 | 8 |
| 2024– | Gold Coast Titans | 5 | 1 | 0 | 0 | 4 |
| | Total | 17 | 5 | 0 | 0 | 20 |
Representative
| Years | Team | Pld | T | G | FG | P |
| 2017–22 | New Zealand | 7 | 0 | 0 | 0 | 0 |
| 2023–25 | Cook Islands | 2 | 1 | 0 | 0 | 4 |
- Source: RLP As of 5 November 2026

Ngatokotoru Arakua (born 13 May 1997) is a New Zealand rugby league footballer who plays as prop for Gold Coast Titans in the NRLW

She previously played for the Brisbane Broncos, St. George Illawarra Dragons and Newcastle Knights in the NRL Women's Premiership.

Primarily a prop, she won a premiership with the Broncos in 2018 and is a New Zealand representative.

== Playing career ==
A Manurewa Marlins junior, Arakua played for the Papakura Sisters in 2017 and was selected in the New Zealand squad for the 2017 Women's Rugby League World Cup. On 2 December 2017, she came off the bench in New Zealand's 16–23 final loss to Australia.

In 2018, she joined the Brisbane Broncos NRL Women's Premiership team. On 30 September 2018, she came off the bench and scored a try in the Broncos' 34–12 Grand Final win over the Sydney Roosters. On 13 October 2018, she started at prop for New Zealand in their 24–26 loss to Australia.

In 2019, Arakua moved to the St George Illawarra Dragons. On 6 October 2019, she started at prop in the Dragons' 6–30 Grand Final loss to the Broncos.

On 1 December 2021, Arakua signed with the Newcastle Knights to be a part of their inaugural NRLW squad.

In round 2 of the delayed 2021 NRL Women's season, Arakua made her club debut for the Knights against the Brisbane Broncos. She played in 2 matches for the Knights, before parting ways with the club at the end of the season.

=== Gold Coast Titans Women ===
On 25 July 2024 it was reported that she had signed for Gold Coast Titans in the NRLW

== Achievements and accolades ==
=== Team ===
- 2018 NRLW Grand Final: Brisbane Broncos – Winners
