= Kylie Hilder =

Australia international rugby league footballer and coach

Personal information
- Born: 1 April 1976 (age 49) Taree, New South Wales, Australia

Playing information
- Position: Hooker
Club
Years	Team	Pld	T	G	FG	P
2018	Sydney Roosters	4	0	0	0	0
Representative
Years	Team	Pld	T	G	FG	P
2009–20	New South Wales	4	0	0	0	0
2009	Australia	1	0	0	0	0
2011	Women's All Stars	1	0	0	0	0

Coaching information
Representative
Years	Team	Gms	W	D	L	W%
2021–	New South Wales	0	0	0	0
- Source: RLP As of 24 February 2021

Kylie Hilder (born 1 April 1976) is an Australian former rugby league footballer who was head coach of the New South Wales Women's State of Origin team.

As a player, she represented Australia and New South Wales, and played for the Sydney Roosters in the NRL Women's Premiership.

== Playing career ==
Before switching to rugby league, Hilder was an Australian touch football representative. She won four Touch Football World Cups for Australia, two in the Women's Open division in 2003 and 2007 and two in the Mixed Open division in 2011 and 2015.

In 2009, she began playing rugby league for the Forestville Ferrets and was selected to represent New South Wales and Australia. In 2010, she represented New South Wales again before returning to touch football.

In 2017, after returning to rugby league, she was named in the New South Wales squad but did not play in their game against Queensland. In June 2018, she represented NSW Country at the inaugural Women's National Championships. On 17 June 2018, she was one of the Sydney Roosters first 15 signings for their NRL Women's Premiership team.

In Round 1 of the 2018 NRL Women's season, she made her debut for the Roosters, starting at hooker in a 4–10 loss to the New Zealand Warriors.

In May 2019, she again represented NSW Country at the Women's National Championships. On 21 June 2019, at 43-years old, Hilder played for New South Wales for the first time in nine years, coming off the bench in a 14–4 win over Queensland.

In 2020, Hilder played for the Central Coast Roosters in the NSWRL Women's Premiership, starting at hooker in their 16–10 Grand Final win over the North Sydney Bears. She announced her retirement after the game. On 13 November 2020, Hilder came out of retirement to play for New South Wales in their State of Origin loss to Queensland. She retired again after the game.

== Coaching career ==
In February 2020, Hilder coached the Sydney Roosters at the NRL Nines in Perth. On 24 June 2020, Hilder was announced as an assistant coach for the Roosters' NRL Women's Premiership team.

On 24 February 2021, Hilder was announced as head coach of the New South Wales Women's State of Origin. In November 2024, Hilder stepped down from the role after four years.
