= Victoria Latu =

Australian rugby league and rugby union footballer

Personal information
- Born: 22 March 1993 (age 33)
- Height: 175 cm (5 ft 9 in)
- Weight: 106 kg (16 st 10 lb)

Playing information

Rugby league
- Position: Prop
Club
| Years | Team | Pld | T | G | FG | P |
|---|---|---|---|---|---|---|
| 2018 | Sydney Roosters | 4 | 1 | 0 | 0 | 4 |
Representative
| Years | Team | Pld | T | G | FG | P |
| 2013 | New South Wales | 1 | 0 | 0 | 0 | 0 |

Rugby union
- Position: No.8
Club
| Years | Team | Pld | T | G | FG | P |
|---|---|---|---|---|---|---|
| 2017 | NSW Waratahs | 7 | 0 | 0 | 0 | 0 |
Representative
| Years | Team | Pld | T | G | FG | P |
| 2017–18 | Australia | 3 | 1 | 0 | 0 | 0 |
- Source: RLP As of 16 November 2023
- Relatives: George Latu (uncle)

Victoria Latu (born 22 March 1993) is an Australian rugby league and rugby union footballer who played for the Sydney Roosters Women in the NRL Women's Premiership. Also a former Wallaroo Australian rugby player

== Playing career ==
=== Rugby league ===
In 2013, Latu represented New South Wales in their 12–30 loss to Queensland.

In 2018, Latu joined the Sydney Roosters NRL Women's Premiership team. In Round 1 of the 2018 NRL Women's season, she made her debut in a 4–10 loss to the New Zealand Warriors. On 30 September 2018, she came off the bench in the Roosters' 12–34 Grand Final loss to the Brisbane Broncos.

=== Rugby union ===
In 2016 and 2017, while playing for New South Wales, Latu was named the Player of the Tournament at the Buildcorp National Women's Championships. In 2016, she was named for the Wallaroos for their tour of New Zealand but was ruled out due to injury. In June 2018, she was named in the Wallaroos squad to play England.

== Personal life ==
Latu's uncle, George Latu, playing 10 Tests for Manu Samoa.
