= Sharon McGrady =

Australian rugby league footballer

Personal information
- Born: 14 March 1993 (age 32) Goondiwindi, Queensland, Australia
- Height: 165 cm (5 ft 5 in)
- Weight: 65 kg (10 st 3 lb)

Playing information
- Position: Fullback, Halfback, Wing
Club
Years	Team	Pld	T	G	FG	P
2018	Sydney Roosters	1	0	0	0	0
Representative
Years	Team	Pld	T	G	FG	P
2014	New South Wales	1	0	0	0	0
2019	Indigenous All Stars	1	0	0	0	0
- Source: RLP As of 6 November 2020

Sharon McGrady (born 14 March 1993) is an Australian rugby league footballer who played for the Sydney Roosters in the NRL Women's Premiership.

Primarily a fullback or halfback, she is a New South Wales and Indigenous All Stars representative.

== Background ==
Born in Goondiwindi, Queensland, McGrady first played rugby league for the Toomelah Tigers in 2010. Her father, Jason, and uncle, Ewan, were both professional rugby league players.

== Playing career ==
On 19 July 2014, McGrady made her debut for New South Wales in a 10–26 loss to Queensland.

In 2018 and 2019, McGrady played for the South Sydney Rabbitohs in the NSWRL Women's Premiership. Later in 2018, McGrady joined the Sydney Roosters NRL Women's Premiership team.

In Round 2 of the 2018 NRL Women's season, she made her debut for the Roosters in their 4–14 loss to the Brisbane Broncos. She dislocated her shoulder during the match and missed the rest of the season.

On 15 February 2019, McGrady started at halfback for the Indigenous All Stars in their 4–8 loss to the Māori All Stars.
