= Amber Pilley =

Australian rugby league player (born 1997)

Personal information
- Born: 8 December 1997 (age 28) Campbelltown, New South Wales, Australia
- Height: 173 cm (5 ft 8 in)
- Weight: 90 kg (14 st 2 lb)

Playing information
- Position: Centre
Club
Years	Team	Pld	T	G	FG	P
2018–19	Brisbane Broncos	8	3	0	0	12
Representative
Years	Team	Pld	T	G	FG	P
2015–19	Indigenous All Stars	3	0	0	0	0
2019	Queensland	1	0	0	0	0
- Source: RLP As of 10 November 2020
Medals
Women's rugby sevens
Representing Australia
Youth Olympic Games
Gold medal – first place	2014 Nanjing	Team competition

Amber Pilley (born 8 December 1997) is an Australian former rugby league footballer who played for the Brisbane Broncos in the NRL Women's Premiership and Burleigh Bears in the QRL Women's Premiership. Primarily a centre, she was a Queensland representative.

== Background ==
Born in Campbelltown, New South Wales, Pilley moved to the Gold Coast, Queensland with her family when she was two. She played junior rugby league for the Nerang Roosters and is of Indigenous descent.

== Playing career ==
In 2014, Pilley represented Australia in rugby sevens at the 2014 Summer Youth Olympics, winning a gold medal. In 2015, she represented the Indigenous All Stars. That year, she tore her anterior cruciate ligament (ACL) ruling her out for 12 months.

In 2017, Pilley joined the Burleigh Bears and represented the Indigenous All Stars. In June 2018, she played for South East Queensland at the Women's National Championships. In August 2018, she joined the Brisbane Broncos NRL Women's Premiership team.

In Round 1 of the 2018 NRL Women's season, Pilley made her debut for the Broncos in a 30–4 win over the St George Illawarra Dragons. On 30 September 2018, she started at centre in the Broncos' 34–12 Grand Final win over the Sydney Roosters.

On 21 June 2019, Pilley made her debut for Queensland, starting at centre in their 4–14 loss to New South Wales. On 6 October 2019, Pilley won her second NRLW Grand Final, starting at centre in a 30–6 win over the St George Illawarra Dragons.

In 2020, Pilley missed the entire season after tearing her ACL, medial collateral ligament (MCL) and meniscus.
