= Maitua Feterika =

NZ international rugby league footballer (born 1992)

Personal information
- Born: 19 May 1992 (age 34) Auckland, New Zealand
- Height: 165 cm (5 ft 5 in)
- Weight: 88 kg (13 st 12 lb)

Playing information
- Position: Second-row, Prop, Centre
Club
Years	Team	Pld	T	G	FG	P
2018	Brisbane Broncos	4	1	0	0	4
2019	St. George Illawarra	4	1	0	0	4
2021	Newcastle Knights	3	1	0	0	4
2024	Papakura Sea Eagles	3	3	0	0	12
	Total	14	6	0	0	24
Representative
Years	Team	Pld	T	G	FG	P
2011	Samoa	1	0	0	0	0
2014–20	New Zealand	10	6	0	0	24
2018	Queensland	1	0	0	0	0
- Source: RLP As of 9 August 2022

Maitua Feterika (born 19 May 1992) is a New Zealand rugby league footballer.

She previously played for the Brisbane Broncos, St George Illawarra Dragons and Newcastle Knights in the NRL Women's Premiership.

Primarily a second-rower, she has represented Samoa, New Zealand and Queensland.

== Playing career ==
A Otahuhu Leopards junior, Feterika represented Samoa in their Test match against Australia in 2011.

In 2014, while playing for Counties Manukau, she was selected for New Zealand, starting on the wing in their 12–8 win over Australia at WIN Stadium. On 2 December 2017, she started at centre in New Zealand's 2017 Women's Rugby League World Cup final loss to Australia.

=== 2018 ===
In 2018, Feterika moved to Australia, joining Ipswich Brothers in the QRL Women's Division 1 competition. In June, she represented South East Queensland at the Women's National Championships. On 22 June, Feterika represented Queensland under residency rules.

On 28 June, she signed with the Brisbane Broncos NRL Women's Premiership team. In Round 1 of the 2018 NRL Women's season, Feterika made her debut in the Broncos' 30–4 win over the St George Illawarra Dragons, scoring a try. On 30 September, she started at second-row in the Broncos' 34–12 Grand Final win over the Sydney Roosters.

=== 2019 ===
In April, revised eligibility laws were announced by the QRL, which ruled Feterika ineligible to represent Queensland. In May, she represented South East Queensland at the Women's National Championships.

In June, Feterika joined St Marys RLFC in the NSWRL Women's Premiership. In July, she signed with the St George Illawarra Dragons. On 6 October, she started at prop in the Dragons' 6–30 Grand Final loss to the Broncos.

=== 2020 ===
In 2020, Feterika began the season playing fore St Marys before returning to New Zealand due to the COVID-19 pandemic, which saw her miss the 2020 NRL Women's season. On 7 November, she played her 10th Test for New Zealand in a 28–8 win over Samoa.

=== 2021 ===
On 1 December, Feterika signed with the Newcastle Knights to be a part of their inaugural NRLW squad.

=== 2022 ===
In round 2 of the delayed 2021 NRL Women's season, Feterika made her club debut for the Knights against the Brisbane Broncos. She played in 3 matches for the Knights, scoring one try, before parting ways with the club at the end of the season.

== Achievements and accolades ==
=== Team ===
- 2018 NRLW Grand Final: Brisbane Broncos – Winners
