= Kandy Kennedy =

Australian rugby league footballer

Personal information
- Born: 17 February 1996 (age 29); Sydney, New South Wales, Australia
- Height: 165 cm (5 ft 5 in)
- Weight: 82 kg (12 st 13 lb)

Playing information
- Position: Lock, Wing
Club
Years	Team	Pld	T	G	FG	P
2018	Sydney Roosters	2	0	0	0	0
Representative
Years	Team	Pld	T	G	FG	P
2013–19	Indigenous All Stars	4	0	0	0	0
- Source: RLP As of 20 October 2020
- Father: William Kennedy
- Relatives: William Kennedy Jr (brother)

Kandy Kennedy (born 17 February 1996) is an Australian rugby league footballer who plays for the Glebe Dirty Reds in the NSWRL Women's Premiership.

She previously played for the Sydney Roosters in the NRL Women's Premiership.

== Background ==
Born in Sydney, Kennedy was raised in Bathurst, New South Wales. Her father, William, played 61 first grade games for the Balmain Tigers and her brother, William Jr, currently plays for the Cronulla-Sutherland Sharks.

== Playing career ==
In 2013, at 16-years old, Kennedy represented the Indigenous All Stars. In 2014, she again represented the Indigenous All Stars, starting on the wing against the Women's All Stars.

In 2017, while representing the Indigenous All Stars for the third time, she tore her anterior cruciate ligament (ACL).

In 2018, she joined the Sydney Roosters NRL Women's Premiership team. In Round 3 of the 2018 NRL Women's season, she made her debut for the Roosters in their 26–0 win over the St George Illawarra Dragons. On 30 September 2018, she came off the bench in the Roosters' Grand Final loss to the Brisbane Broncos.

On 15 February 2019, she started at lock for the Indigenous All Stars in their 4–8 loss to the Maori All Stars.

In 2019 and 2020, she played for the South Sydney Rabbitohs in the NSWRL Women's Premiership.

In 2021, she joined the Glebe Dirty Reds for their inaugural season in the NSWRL Women's Premiership.
