= 2018 NRL Women's season =

2018 NRL Women's Premiership
- Duration: 8 September to 30 September 2018
- Teams: 4
- Premiers: Brisbane Broncos (1st title)
- Minor premiers: Brisbane Broncos (1st title)
- Matches played: 7
- Points scored: 212
- Total attendance: 46,875 (Avg. 11,719)
- Top points scorer: Chelsea Baker (38)
- Biggest home win: Broncos 30 — 4 Dragons at Suncorp Stadium, Brisbane (Round 1) 9 September 2018; Roosters 26 — 0 Dragons at Allianz Stadium, Sydney (Round 3) 22 September 2018
- Dally M Award: Brittany Breayley
- Top try-scorer: Taleena Simon (4)

The 2018 NRL Women's Premiership (NRLW) was the first season of professional women's rugby league in Australia.

== Teams ==
Club	Season	Head coach	Captain(s)	Ref
Brisbane Broncos	1st season	Paul Dyer	Ali Brigginshaw (4)	
New Zealand Warriors	1st season	Luisa Avaiki	Laura Mariu (3)	
St. George Illawarra Dragons	1st season	Daniel Lacey	Sam Bremner (1) also Kezie Apps (2: Rounds 2 & 3)	
Sydney Roosters	1st season	Adam Hartigan	Simaima Taufa (4)	

Notes:

- In the Captain(s) column
  - The number next to the name indicates the number of games played as captain
  - The word also indicates the player deputised as captain when the regular captain missed one or more matches.

== Pre-season ==
Only two of the four sides, the Brisbane Broncos and New Zealand Warriors, took part in pre-season trial games. The Warriors played two fixtures against a combined Auckland side, while the Broncos played the Papua New Guinea Orchids as a curtain-raiser to the Brisbane Broncos-Manly Sea Eagles NRL fixture. The Sydney Roosters were due to play the North Sydney Bears but the game was cancelled due to player availability. They instead underwent an opposed session with the Roosters' under-20 Jersey Flegg Cup side.

Home	Score	Away	Match Information
Home	Score	Away	Date and Time (Local)	Venue	Referees	Crowd
New Zealand Warriors	32 – 4	Auckland	10 August 2018, 6:00pm	Mt Smart Stadium	Rochelle Tamarua	-
New Zealand Warriors	22 – 16	Auckland	25 August 2018, 3:15pm	Mt Smart Stadium No. 2	Rochelle Tamarua	-
Brisbane Broncos	48 – 14	Papua New Guinea Orchids	2 September 2018, 1:30pm	Suncorp Stadium	-	9,938

== Regular season ==
The inaugural season will operate under a round-robin format, with games played as curtain-raisers to the 2018 NRL Finals Series. The top two finishing teams will then contest the Grand Final, which is to be played before the men's Grand Final on 30 September.

=== Round 1 ===
Home	Score	Away	Match Information
Home	Score	Away	Date and Time (Local)	Venue	Referees	Crowd
Sydney Roosters	4 – 10	New Zealand Warriors	8 September 2018, 3:05pm	ANZ Stadium	Jon Stone; Joshua McGowan	17,168
Brisbane Broncos	30 – 4	St. George Illawarra Dragons	9 September 2018, 1:45pm	Suncorp Stadium	Matt Noyen; Kasey Badger	47,296
Source: LeagueUnlimted.com NRL.com NZW-SR Highlights NZW-SR Replay BB-SGID Highlights BB-SGID Replay

=== Round 2 ===
Home	Score	Away	Match Information
Home	Score	Away	Date and Time (Local)	Venue	Referees	Crowd
Sydney Roosters	4 – 14	Brisbane Broncos	14 September 2018, 5:15pm	Allianz Stadium	Peter Gough; Joshua McGowan	19,211
St. George Illawarra Dragons	22 – 10	New Zealand Warriors	15 September 2018, 5:10pm	ANZ Stadium	Matt Noyen; Wyatt Raymond	16,274 (48,188)
Source: LeagueUnlimited.com NRL.com SR-BB Highlights SR-BB Replay SGID-NZW Highlights SGID-NZW Replay

=== Round 3 ===
Home	Score	Away	Match Information
Home	Score	Away	Date and Time (Local)	Venue	Referees	Crowd
Brisbane Broncos	32 – 10	New Zealand Warriors	21 September 2018, 5:15pm	AAMI Park	Peter Gough; Jake Sutherland	26,621
Sydney Roosters	26 – 0	St. George Illawarra Dragons	22 September 2018, 5:10pm	Allianz Stadium	Jon Stone; Kasey Badger	15,577 (44,380)
Source: LeagueUnlimited.com NRL.com BB-NZW Highlights BB-NZW Replay SR-SGID Highlights SR-SGID Replay

== Ladder ==
2018 NRL Women's season
Pos	Team	Pld	W	D	L	PF	PA	PD	Pts
1	Brisbane Broncos	3	3	0	0	76	18	+58	6
2	Sydney Roosters	3	1	0	2	34	24	+10	2
3	New Zealand Warriors	3	1	0	2	30	58	−28	2
4	St. George Illawarra Dragons	3	1	0	2	26	66	−40	2

Source: 2018 NRLW Ladder

=== Ladder progression ===
- Numbers highlighted in green indicate that the team finished the round inside the top two.
- Numbers highlighted in blue indicates the team finished first on the ladder in that round.
- Numbers highlighted in red indicates the team finished last place on the ladder in that round.

	Team	1	2	3
1	Brisbane Broncos	2	4	6
2	Sydney Roosters	0	0	2
3	New Zealand Warriors	2	2	2
4	St. George Illawarra Dragons	0	2	2

== Grand Final ==
Sunday, 30 September
1:35pm

Brisbane Broncos	34 – 12	Sydney Roosters
Tries: Kimiora Nati (5', 17', 45') 3 Heather Ballinger (13') 1 Ngatokotoru Arakua (24') 1 Lavinia Gould (28') 1 Goals: Chelsea Baker 5/6 (6', 15', 18', 25', 47')	1st: 28 – 6; 2nd: 6 – 6 Highlights; Report	Tries: 1 (10') Tazmin Grey; 1 (43') Lavina O'Mealey; Goals: 2/3 Zahara Temara (4', 44')

ANZ Stadium
Attendance: 16,214
(82,688)
Karyn Murphy Medallist: Kimiora Nati (Brisbane)
Referee: Jon Stone, Kasey Badger

Team lists:

FB	1	Chelsea Baker
WG	2	Julia Robinson
CE	3	Meg Ward
CE	4	Amber Pilley
WG	5	Amelia Kuk
FE	6	Kimiora Nati
HB	7	Ali Brigginshaw (c)
PR	8	Heather Ballinger
HK	9	Brittany Breayley
PR	15	Chelsea Lenarduzzi
SR	11	Teuila Fotu-Moala
SR	12	Maitua Feterika
LK	13	Rona Peters
Substitutes:
IC	10	Steph Hancock
IC	14	Lavinia Gould
IC	16	Mariah Storch
IC	17	Ngatokotoru Arakua
Coach: Paul Dyer

FB	1	Karina Brown
WG	2	Brydie Parker
CE	3	Shontelle Stowers
CE	4	Isabelle Kelly
WG	5	Taleena Simon
FE	6	Lavina O'Mealey
HB	7	Zahara Temara
PR	8	Ruan Sims
HK	9	Nita Maynard
PR	10	Elianna Walton
SR	11	Tazmin Grey
SR	12	Vanessa Foliaki
LK	13	Simaima Taufa (c)
Substitutes:
IC	14	Kylie Hilder
IC	15	Sarah Togatuki
IC	16	Victoria Latu
IC	17	Kandy Kennedy
Coach: Adam Hartigan
