= McBride (surname) =

The name "McBride" or "MacBride" is an Irish surname, the English spelling for the Irish name "Mac Giolla Bhríde". The surname is also found in Scotland, and is the anglicized form of Gaelic Mac Brighde, from earlier Mac Giolla Bhrighde (Irish), Mac Gille Brighde (Scottish) ‘son of the servant of (Saint) Brighid’.

The name originated in County Donegal in Ireland and later moved to Kintyre Peninsula in Scotland. The name signifies a devotee of the Irish saint Brigid of Kildare. It is a Sept of the Ui Brolchainn Clan of the Cenél nEógain, son of Niall of the Nine Hostages.

== List of people surnamed McBride ==
=== A ===
- Alexander McBride (1833–1912), the ninth mayor of Calgary, Alberta
- Algie McBride (1869–1956), American professional baseball player
- Andréa McBride (born 1983), New Zealand-American entrepreneur
- Andrew McBride (disambiguation), various people
- Andy McBride (born 1954), English footballer
- Angus McBride (1931–2007), British fantasy and historical illustrator
- Anne McBride (1944–2020), Canadian politician
- Arthur B. McBride (1888–1972), founder of the Cleveland Browns professional American football team

=== B ===
- Bake McBride (born 1949), Major League Baseball player
- Bernard McBride (1845–?), soldier who served with the 8th U.S. Cavalry during the Indian Wars
- Bill McBride (candidate) (1945–2012), 2002 candidate for Florida governor
- Bob McBride (1946–1998), lead vocalist for the Canadian popular music group Lighthouse
- Brian McBride (1970–2023), American musician
- Brian McBride (born 1972), American football (soccer) player
- Bryan McBride (born 1991), American track and field athlete
- Bunny McBride (born 1950), American writer and anthropology lecturer

=== C ===
- Carol McBride Pirsch (born 1936), member of the Nebraska Legislature
- Catherine McBride-Chang, developmental psychologist
- Charles McBride (sculptor) (1853–1903), Scottish sculptor
- Charlie McBride (rugby league) (1925–2013), New Zealand rugby league player
- Chase McBride, American songwriter and visual artist based in Washington, D.C.
- Chi McBride (born 1961), American actor
- Christian McBride (born 1972), American musician
- Cliff McBride (1909–1999), Canadian ice hockey player
- Clifford McBride (1901–1951), American cartoonist best known for his comic strip Napoleon and Uncle Elby
- Conor McBride (born 1973), computing science researcher and lecturer at the University of Strathclyde

=== D ===
- Damian McBride (born 1974), former advisor to British government
- Daniel McBride (disambiguation), various people
- Danny McBride (disambiguation), various people
- Darl McBride (1959–2024), former CEO (2002–2007) of the SCO Group
- David D. McBride, former director of NASA Armstrong
- David McBride (born 1942), American politician who has served continuously in Delaware's General Assembly since 1978
- David McBride (whistleblower) (born 1963 or 1964), Australian military lawyer and whistleblower
- Denis McBride, Scottish priest and theologian
- Denis McBride (born 1964), Irish rugby union player
- Dermot McBride (born 1988), Irish Gaelic footballer
- DeWayne McBride (born 2001), American football player
- Dick McBride (1928–2012), American poet
- Dick McBride (baseball) (1847–1916), American Major League Baseball player for the Philadelphia Athletics

=== E ===
- Edward William McBride (1791–1834), businessman and political figure in Upper Canada
- Eimear McBride (born 1976), novelist, author of A Girl Is a Half-formed Thing
- Elizabeth McBride (1955–1997), American costume designer
- Ella E. McBride (1862–1965), American fine-art photographer and mountain climber
- Emma McBride (born 1975), Australian politician
- Ernest McBride Sr. (1909–2007), civil rights activist and community leader based in Long Beach, California
- Everett McBride, American politician

=== F ===
- Francis Scott McBride (1929–1955), Presbyterian minister active in the Anti-Saloon League
- Frankie McBride (born 1944), Irish country singer

=== G ===
- Gary McBride (1980–2009), rugby league footballer for the St. George Illawarra Dragons
- George McBride (1880–1973), shortstop for the Milwaukee Brewers, Pittsburgh Pirates, St. Louis Cardinals, and the Washington Senators
- George W. McBride (1854–1911), politician and businessman from Oregon
- Grant McBride (1949–2018), Australian politician

=== H ===
- Harlee McBride (born 1948), American actor
- Henry McBride (art critic) (1867–1962)
- Henry McBride (politician) (1856–1937), governor of Washington
- Horace L. McBride (1894–1962), U.S. Army General during World War II

=== I ===
- Ian McBride, professor of Irish and British history at King's College London

=== J ===
- Jack McBride Ryder (1928–2019), second president of Saginaw Valley State College
- Jack McBride (1901–1966), American football player who played for several teams in the NFL
- James McBride (disambiguation), various people
- Janette McBride (born 1983), Australian actor
- Jean McBride, Canadian judge
- Jeff McBride (born 1959), American magician
- Jerry McBride (born 1939), American politician from Missouri
- Jim McBride (born 1941), American television and film director and producer
- Joan McBride, American politician who was the mayor of Kirkland, Washington, from 2010 to 2013, and a member of the Washington House of Representatives
- Joe McBride (1938–2012), Scottish footballer
- Joe McBride (born 1960), Scottish footballer
- John McBride (labor leader) (1854–1917), American labor union leader
- John McBride (born 1967), American photographer
- John C. McBride (1908–1979), American politician
- John Paul McBride (born 1978), Scottish footballer
- John R. McBride (1832–1904), U.S. congressman from Oregon
- Johnny McBride (born 1977), Irish Gaelic footballer
- Jon McBride (filmmaker) (born 1960), American Z movie director, producer, screenwriter and actor
- Jon McBride (1943–2024), American naval officer and astronaut
- Joseph McBride (born 1947), American film critic and screenwriter
- Julie McBride (born 1982), American basketball player
- Justin McBride (born 1979), American bull rider

=== K ===
- Katharine Elizabeth McBride (1904–1976), fourth president of Bryn Mawr College
- Kayla McBride (born 1992), American professional basketball player for the San Antonio Stars
- Ken McBride (basketball) (1929–2005), American basketball player who played for the Syracuse Nationals and the Milwaukee Hawks
- Ken McBride (born 1935), Major League Baseball pitcher
- Karyl McBride, American psychotherapist and author
- Kevin McBride, (born 1981) Scottish footballer
- Kevin McBride (born 1973), Irish boxer
- Kevin McBride (born 1972), Vice President of Asda
- Kirsty McBride (born 1985), Scottish footballer

=== M ===
- Macay McBride (born 1982), American baseball player
- Malcolm McBride (1878–1941), American football player and coach
- Margaret McBride, American nun
- Marion A. McBride (1850–1909), American journalist
- Martha McBride Knight (1805–1901), founding member of the Relief Society of the Church of Jesus Christ of Latter Day Saints
- Martina McBride (born 1966), American country music singer
- Mary McBride (musician), American country music singer
- Mary Margaret McBride (1899–1976), American radio personality and writer
- Matt McBride (born 1985), American professional baseball right fielder and first baseman for the Colorado Rockies
- Megan McBride (born 1991), USA weightlifter
- Melissa McBride (born 1965), American actress
- Michael McBride (disambiguation), various people
- Murray McBride (born 1935), Canadian politician

=== N ===
- Neil McBride (1910–1974), British Labour Party politician
- Norm McBride (born 1947), American football player

=== P ===
- Pat McBride (1943–2024), American soccer player and coach
- Patricia McBride Lousada (1929–2019), American ballet dancer and cookbook author
- Patricia McBride (born 1942), New York City Ballet principal dancer
- Paul McBride (1964–2012), Scottish criminal lawyer based in Edinburgh
- Pete McBride (1875–1944), pitcher in Major League Baseball
- Peter McBride (footballer) (1877–1950), Scottish association football player
- Peter McBride (physician) (1854–1946), Scottish ENT specialist
- Peter McBride (Australian politician) (1867–1923), Victorian MLA and Agent-General
- Peter McBride Jr. (1974–1992), Northern Irish murder victim
- Philip McBride (1892–1982), Australian politician

=== R ===
- Reggie McBride (born 1954), American bass guitar player
- Renisha McBride (1994–2013), 19-year-old African-American woman who was shot and killed after knocking on the windows of a house in Dearborn Heights, Michigan
- Sir Richard McBride (1870–1917), former premier of British Columbia
- Richard McBride (visual effects), visual effects supervisor
- Robert McBride (disambiguation), various people
- Ron McBride (born 1948), American footballer
- Ron McBride (born 1939), American football coach
- Roy McBride (1921–2007), American ice hockey player and coach

=== S ===
- Sam McBride (1866–1936), two-time mayor of Toronto
- Sarah McBride (born 1990), American transgender LGBT rights activist and U.S. Representative from Delaware
- Scott McBride (born 1989), Scottish footballer
- Seth McBride (born 1983), American Paralympic wheelchair rugby player and five-time gold medalist from Seattle, Washington
- Shaheer McBride (born 1985), American footballer
- Simon McBride (born 1979), (Northern) Irish singer, songwriter, producer and guitarist
- Stephen McBride (born 1983), Northern Irish footballer
- Stephen McBride (footballer, born 1964) (born 1964), Northern Irish footballer
- Steve McBride, Northern Irish politician

=== T ===
- Terry McBride (born 1960), Canadian businessman
- Terry McBride (born 1958), American musician
- Thomas McBride (born 1992), Northern Irish footballer
- Thomas A. McBride (1847–1930), American attorney and judge in Oregon
- Thomas George McBride (1867–1950), member of the Canadian House of Commons
- Thomas (Big Tom) McBride (1936-2018) Irish country and western and ballad singer
- Tod McBride (born 1976), American football player
- Tom McBride (actor) (1952–1995), American actor
- Tom McBride (baseball) (1914–2001), Major League Baseball outfielder
- Tracie McBride (died 1995), American female murder victim
- Tre McBride (born 1992), American football player
- Trey McBride (born 1999), American football player
- Trumaine McBride (born 1985), American football player
- Turk McBride (born 1985), American football player

=== V ===
- Vincent McBride (1934–2005), association footballer who played for Walsall and Mansfield Town
- Violet McBride (born 1954), British field hockey player who competed in the 1988 Summer Olympics

=== W ===
- Walter McBride (1904–1974), English cricketer who played for Oxford University and Hampshire
- Will McBride (photographer) (1931–2015), erotic photographer
- William McBride (doctor) (1927–2018), Australian physician
- William V. McBride (1922–2022), United States Air Force General
- Willie John McBride (born 1940), Irish rugby union player

=== Fictional ===
- Clyde, Howard and Harold McBride, all from The Loud House
- Gabriela McBride, American Girl character, "Girl of the Year" for 2017

== See also ==
- MacBride
- MacBride (disambiguation)
- MacBryde
- McBride (disambiguation)
- McBryde (disambiguation)
