= Bryde =

Bryde may refer to:

== People ==
- Brun-Otto Bryde born 1943), German jurist
- Johan Bryde (1858–1925), Norwegian ship-owner, whaler and businessman
- Vilhelm Bryde (1888–1974), Swedish actor and art director
- Bryde, stage name of Welsh singer-songwriter Sarah Howells

== Places ==
- Lake Bryde-East Lake Bryde, a freshwater wetland system in Western Australia
- Bryde Island, an island in Canada
- Bryde Island (Antarctica)

== Other uses ==
- Bryde's whale

== See also ==
- Bride (disambiguation)
- MacBryde (disambiguation)
- McBryde (disambiguation)
