= List of St. George Illawarra Dragons players =

This article lists all rugby league footballers who have played first-grade for the St. George Illawarra Dragons in the National Rugby League. The St. George Illawarra Dragons are a rugby league club who compete in Australasia's National Rugby League, winning the premiership once in 2010. They share home games between Jubilee Oval and Wollongong Showground.

== List of players ==
Notes:

- Debut:
  - Players are listed in the order of their debut game with the club.
  - Players that debuted in the same game are added alphabetically.
- Appearances: St. George Illawarra Dragons games only, not a total of their career games. E.g. Nathan Fien has played a career total of 276 first-grade games but of those, 80 were at St. George Illawarra.
- Previous Club: refers to the previous first-grade rugby league club (NRL or Super League) the player played at and does not refer to any junior club, Rugby Union club or a rugby league club he was signed to but never played at.
- The statistics in this table are correct as of round 12 of the 2026 NRL season.

Cap no.	Name	Nationality	Dragons career	Debut round	Previous club	Position	Appearances	Tries	Goals	Field goals	Points
1.	Jamie Ainscough	(Australia)	1999–01	Rd. 1	St. George Dragons	Centre	69	25	2	0	104
2.	Trent Barrett	(Australia)	1999–06	Rd. 1	Illawarra Steelers	Five-eighth	154	47	0	5	193
3.	Wayne Bartrim	(Australia)	1999–01	Rd. 1	St. George Dragons	Lock	72	8	171	0	374
4.	Nathan Blacklock	(Australia)	1999–04	Rd. 1	St. George Dragons	Wing	114	100	14	0	428
5.	Nathan Brown	(Australia)	1999–00	Rd. 1	St. George Dragons	Hooker	52	9	0	0	36
6.	Mark Coyne	(Australia)	1999	Rd. 1	St. George Dragons	Centre	15	5	0	0	20
7.	Craig Fitzgibbon	(Australia)	1999	Rd. 1	Illawarra Steelers	Second-row	15	4	25	0	66
8.	Brad Mackay	(Australia)	1999	Rd. 1	Illawarra Steelers	Lock	23	3	4	0	20
9.	Paul McGregor	(Australia)	1999, 2001	Rd. 1	Illawarra Steelers	Centre	34	13	0	0	52
10.	Anthony Mundine	(Australia)	1999–00	Rd. 1	St. George Dragons	Five-eighth	33	19	0	0	76
11.	Lee Murphy	(Australia)	1999–00	Rd. 1	St. George Dragons	Fullback	20	2	0	0	8
12.	Corey Pearson	(Australia)	1999–00	Rd. 1	St. George Dragons	Prop	34	2	0	0	8
13.	Craig Smith	(New Zealand) (Australia)	1999–01	Rd. 1	Illawarra Steelers	Prop	52	1	0	0	4
14.	Lance Thompson	(Australia)	1999–05	Rd. 1	St. George Dragons	Second-row	132	20	8	0	96
15.	Shaun Timmins	(Australia)	1999–00, 2002–06	Rd. 1	Illawarra Steelers	Second-row	124	27	0	0	108
16.	Darren Treacy	(Australia)	1999–01	Rd. 1	St. George Dragons	Second-row	66	12	0	0	48
17.	Colin Ward	(Australia)	1999–01	Rd. 1	St. George Dragons	Prop	53	3	0	0	12
18.	Andrew Hart	(Australia)	1999–01	Rd. 2	Illawarra Steelers	Second-row	67	7	0	0	28
19.	Luke Patten	(Australia)	1999–00	Rd. 2	Illawarra Steelers	Fullback	44	13	0	0	52
20.	Chris Leikvoll	(Australia)	1999–03	Rd. 3	Illawarra Steelers	Prop	91	2	0	0	8
21.	Rod Wishart	(Australia)	1999	Rd. 3	Illawarra Steelers	Wing	23	10	4	0	48
22.	Jason Hooper	(Australia)	1999–02	Rd. 8	Illawarra Steelers	Lock	79	26	0	0	104
23.	Matthew Rodwell	(Australia)	1999	Rd. 12	St. George Dragons	Halfback	8	0	0	0	0
24.	Warren Carney	(Australia)	1999	Rd. 23	Debut	Hooker	1	0	0	0	0
25.	Terry Lamey	(Australia)	1999–00	Rd. 23	Illawarra Steelers	Second-row	18	1	0	0	4
26.	Luke Bailey	(Australia)	2000–06	Rd. 1	Debut	Prop	119	7	0	0	28
27.	Matt Cooper	(Australia)	2000–13	Rd. 1	Debut	Centre	243	124	0	0	496
28.	Lee Hookey	(Australia)	2000–02	Rd. 1	South Sydney Rabbitohs	Centre	61	32	0	0	128
29.	Junior Langi	(New Zealand)	2000	Rd. 3	Debut	Centre	3	0	0	0	0
30.	Solomon Haumono	(New Zealand) (Australia) (Tonga)	2000	Rd. 4	Balmain Tigers	Second-row	2	0	0	0	0
31.	Daniel Heckenberg	(Australia) (Scotland)	2000	Rd. 6	Debut	Prop	4	0	0	0	0
32.	Mark Gasnier	(Australia)	2000–08, 2010–11	Rd. 8	Debut	Centre	174	92	26	0	420
33.	Luke Branighan	(Australia) (Malta)	2000	Rd. 11	Debut	Halfback	15	2	0	0	8
34.	Robbie Simpson	(Australia)	2000, 2003	Rd. 13	London Broncos	Second-row	6	0	0	0	0
35.	Wes Patten	(Australia)	2000	Rd. 14	South Sydney Rabbitohs	Halfback	10	2	0	0	8
36.	Amos Roberts	(Australia)	2000–03	Rd. 14	Debut	Wing	65	29	26	0	168
37.	Jason Ryles	(Australia)	2000–08	Rd. 15	Debut	Prop	156	13	0	0	52
38.	Jamie Fitzgerald	(Australia)	2000–01	Rd. 16	North Sydney Bears	Lock	20	0	0	0	0
39.	Ben Hornby	(Australia)	2000–12	Rd. 23	Debut	Halfback	273	59	12	2	262
40.	Justin Smith	(Australia)	2000–02	Rd. 24	Debut	Second-row	30	8	4	0	40
41.	Willie Peters	(Australia)	2001–02	Rd. 1	South Sydney Rabbitohs	Halfback	38	13	0	5	57
42.	Mark Riddell	(Australia)	2001–04	Rd. 1	Debut	Hooker	92	30	198	1	517
43.	Ben Jeffries	(Australia)	2001	Rd. 4	Debut	Halfback	1	0	0	0	0
44.	Wade Forrester	(Australia)	2001	Rd. 5	Cronulla-Sutherland Sharks	Second-row	2	1	0	0	4
45.	Craig Stapleton	(Australia)	2001–03	Rd. 10	St. George Dragons	Prop	30	2	0	0	8
46.	Wise Kativerata	(Fiji)	2001–02	Rd. 13	Debut	Wing	5	1	0	0	4
47.	Keiran Kerr	(Australia)	2001	Rd. 17	Debut	Halfback	2	2	0	0	8
48.	Andrew Bobbin	(Australia)	2001	Rd. 25	Debut	?	1	0	0	0	0
49.	Luke Felsch	(Australia)	2002	Rd. 1	Hull F.C.	Prop	16	1	0	0	4
50.	Brent Kite	(Australia) (Tonga)	2002–04	Rd. 1	Debut	Prop	67	9	0	0	36
51.	Gary McBride	(Australia)	2002	Rd. 1	Debut	Second-row	2	0	0	0	0
52.	Shane Millard	(Australia) (United States)	2002	Rd. 1	London Broncos	Hooker	23	4	0	0	16
53.	Reece Simmonds	(Australia)	2002–06, 2011	Rd. 1	Debut, South Sydney Rabbitohs	Wing	50	23	0	0	92
54.	Nathan Tutt	(Australia)	2002–03	Rd. 3	Sydney Roosters	Second-row	19	4	0	0	16
55.	Aaron Gorrell	(Australia)	2002, 2005–06	Rd. 5	Debut	Hooker	48	7	94	0	216
56.	Ben Ross	(Australia)	2002	Rd. 6	Debut	Prop	8	0	0	0	0
57.	Shane Laloata	(Samoa)	2002	Rd. 9	Debut	Wing	11	4	0	0	16
58.	Damien Bower	(Australia)	2002–03	Rd. 10	Debut	Five-eighth	12	0	0	0	0
59.	Jason Kent	(Australia)	2002	Rd. 12	Debut	Centre	7	0	1	0	2
60.	Michael Howell	(Australia)	2002–04	Rd. 16	Debut	Lock	15	2	0	0	8
61.	Leo Clarke	(Australia)	2002	Rd. 26	Western Suburbs Magpies	Wing	3	1	4	0	12
62.	John Cross	(Australia)	2003	Rd. 1	Penrith Panthers	Lock	19	2	0	0	8
63.	Peter Ellis	(Australia)	2003	Rd. 1	Sydney Roosters	Second-row	1	0	0	0	0
64.	Brett Firman	(Australia)	2003–04	Rd. 1	Debut	Halfback	22	7	11	0	50
65.	Chris Nero	(Australia)	2003–04	Rd. 1	Debut	Centre	7	2	0	0	8
66.	Hassan Saleh	(Australia) (Lebanon)	2003	Rd. 1	Wests Tigers	Wing	11	1	0	0	4
67.	Dean Byrne	(Australia)	2003	Rd. 2	Debut	Halfback	6	2	3	0	14
68.	Henry Perenara	(New Zealand)	2003–04	Rd. 2	Melbourne Storm	Lock	16	1	0	0	4
69.	Ryan Tandy	(Australia) (Republic of Ireland)	2003	Rd. 2	Debut	Prop	3	0	0	0	0
70.	Dean Young	(Australia)	2003–12	Rd. 2	Debut	Lock	209	19	0	0	76
71.	Ian Donnelly	(Australia)	2003	Rd. 3	Debut	Prop	17	0	0	0	0
72.	Mathew Head	(Australia)	2003–07, 2009	Rd. 3	Debut, Wests Tigers	Halfback	67	7	95	1	219
73.	David Howell	(Australia)	2003–04	Rd. 3	Debut	Centre	12	5	0	0	20
74.	Ashton Sims	(Australia) (Fiji)	2003–07	Rd. 9	Debut	Second-row	81	9	0	0	36
75.	Quentin Pongia	(New Zealand)	2003	Rd. 14	Sydney Roosters	Prop	2	0	0	0	0
76.	John Wilshere	(Papua New Guinea)	2003	Rd. 14	Melbourne Storm	Wing	10	3	0	0	12
77.	Michael Henderson	(Australia)	2003–06, 2013	Rd. 17	Debut, Gold Coast Titans	Prop	41	1	0	0	4
78.	Ben Creagh	(Australia)	2003–15	Rd. 22	Debut	Second-row	247	54	0	0	216
79.	Nathan Long	(Australia)	2004	Rd. 1	Manly–Warringah Sea Eagles	Second-row	1	0	0	0	0
80.	Justin Poore	(Australia)	2004–09	Rd. 1	Debut	Prop	128	5	0	0	20
81.	Lincoln Withers	(Australia)	2004	Rd. 1	Wests Tigers	Hooker	25	5	0	0	20
82.	Tony Jensen	(Australia)	2004	Rd. 2	Manly–Warringah Sea Eagles	Second-row	13	1	0	0	4
83.	Ryan Powell	(Australia)	2004–05	Rd. 2	Debut	Hooker	5	0	0	0	0
84.	John Carlaw	(Australia)	2004	Rd. 7	New Zealand Warriors	Centre	15	3	0	0	12
85.	Clint Greenshields	(Australia) (France)	2004–06	Rd. 9	Debut	Fullback	36	11	0	0	44
86.	Lachlan Russell	(Australia)	2004	Rd. 10	Debut	Halfback	1	0	0	0	0
87.	Daniel Holdsworth	(Australia)	2004–05	Rd. 11	Debut	Five-eighth	6	2	0	0	8
88.	Bryan Norrie	(Australia)	2004–05	Rd. 11	Debut	Prop	7	0	0	0	0
89.	Aaron Wheatley	(Australia)	2004	Rd. 11	Debut	Second-row	5	0	0	0	0
90.	Andrew Frew	(Australia)	2004	Rd. 18	Halifax	Wing	1	1	0	0	0
91.	Nick Youngquest	(Australia)	2004–05	Rd. 21	Cronulla-Sutherland Sharks	Wing	10	6	0	0	24
92.	Colin Best	(Australia)	2005–06	Rd. 1	Hull F.C.	Centre	45	26	0	0	104
93.	Michael Ennis	(Australia)	2005	Rd. 1	Newcastle Knights	Hooker	24	5	44	0	108
94.	Willie Manu	(Australia) (Tonga)	2005	Rd. 1	South Sydney Rabbitohs	Second-row	14	1	0	0	4
95.	Corey Payne	(Australia)	2005–07	Rd. 1	Debut	Second-row	47	8	0	0	32
96.	Albert Torrens	(Australia)	2005	Rd. 2	Manly–Warringah Sea Eagles	Centre	10	3	0	0	12
97.	Wes Naiqama	(Australia) (Fiji)	2005–07	Rd. 4	Debut	Centre	38	16	48	0	160
98.	Shane Marteene	(Australia)	2005	Rd. 11	South Sydney Rabbitohs	Centre	2	1	0	0	4
99.	Chris Sheppard	(Australia)	2005–06	Rd. 18	North Queensland Cowboys	Halfback	4	0	0	0	0
100.	Matt Bickerstaff	(Australia)	2006	Rd. 1	Cronulla-Sutherland Sharks	Second-row	25	4	0	0	16
101.	Andrew Price	(Australia)	2006	Rd. 1	Newcastle Knights	Second-row	5	1	0	0	4
102.	Daryl Millard	(Australia) (Fiji)	2006	Rd. 2	Debut	Centre	12	4	0	0	16
103.	George Ndaira	(Australia) (Lebanon)	2006	Rd. 2	Debut	Hooker	3	0	0	0	0
104.	Sam Isemonger	(Australia)	2006–07	Rd. 3	Cronulla-Sutherland Sharks	Second-row	21	1	0	0	4
105.	Lee Te Maari	(New Zealand)	2006	Rd. 7	Debut	Lock	2	0	0	0	0
106.	Charlie Leaeno	(American Samoa)	2006	Rd. 9	Debut	Prop	6	3	0	0	12
107.	Brett Morris	(Australia)	2006–14	Rd. 9	Debut	Wing	169	112	0	0	448
108.	Danny Wicks	(Australia)	2006–07	Rd. 10	Debut	Prop	29	2	0	0	8
109.	Tony Caine	(Australia)	2007	Rd. 1	Cronulla-Sutherland Sharks	Hooker	9	0	0	0	0
110.	Dan Hunt	(Australia)	2007–14	Rd. 1	Debut	Prop	150	8	0	0	32
111.	Keith Lulia	(Australia) (Cook Islands)	2007	Rd. 1	Debut	Centre	7	3	0	0	12
112.	Luke MacDougall	(Australia) (Scotland)	2007	Rd. 1	South Sydney Rabbitohs	Wing	4	1	0	0	4
113.	Josh Morris	(Australia)	2007–08	Rd. 1	Debut	Centre	46	20	0	0	80
114.	Adam Peek	(Australia)	2007	Rd. 1	Parramatta Eels	Second-row	19	1	0	0	4
115.	Beau Scott	(Australia)	2007–12	Rd. 1	Cronulla-Sutherland Sharks	Second-row	118	13	0	0	52
116.	Richard Williams	(Australia)	2007	Rd. 1	Debut	Five-eighth	8	5	0	0	20
117.	Simon Woolford	(Australia)	2007–08	Rd. 1	Canberra Raiders	Hooker	28	1	0	0	4
118.	Lagi Setu	(New Zealand) (Samoa)	2007–08	Rd. 2	Debut	Second-row	31	1	0	0	4
119.	Chase Stanley	(Australia) (New Zealand) (Samoa)	2007–09, 2012–13	Rd. 2	Debut	Centre	73	16	24	0	112
120.	Rangi Chase	(New Zealand) (England)	2007–08	Rd. 3	Wests Tigers	Five-eighth	31	7	0	0	28
121.	Chris Houston	(Australia)	2007	Rd. 3	Debut	Prop	16	0	0	0	0
122.	Ben Ellis	(New Zealand)	2007–08	Rd. 5	Debut	Hooker	21	2	0	0	8
123.	Tom Hewitt	(Australia)	2007	Rd. 5	Debut	Wing	5	4	0	0	16
124.	Jason Nightingale	(Australia) (New Zealand)	2007–18	Rd. 8	Debut	Wing	266	110	0	0	440
125.	Jamie Soward	(Australia)	2007–13	Rd. 12	Sydney Roosters	Five-eighth	140	39	398	25	977
126.	Ricky Thorby	(New Zealand)	2007–10	Rd. 12	Debut	Second-row	21	0	0	0	0
127.	Kirk Reynoldson	(Australia)	2008	Rd. 1	Newcastle Knights	Second-row	21	1	0	0	4
128.	Jarrod Saffy	(South Africa) (Australia)	2008–10	Rd. 1	Wests Tigers	Second-row	53	1	0	0	4
129.	Stuart Webb	(Australia)	2008	Rd. 4	South Sydney Rabbitohs	Hooker	19	1	0	0	4
130.	Jon Green	(Australia)	2008–11	Rd. 5	Canterbury-Bankstown Bulldogs	Prop	51	2	0	0	8
131.	Matt Prior	(Australia)	2008–13	Rd. 5	Debut	Second-row	120	8	0	0	32
132.	Michael Lett	(Australia)	2008–10	Rd. 6	Sydney Roosters	Wing	8	4	0	0	16
133.	Wendell Sailor	(Australia)	2008–09	Rd. 13	Brisbane Broncos	Wing	33	17	0	0	68
134.	Ben Rogers	(Australia)	2008	Rd. 23	South Sydney Rabbitohs	Five-eighth	5	0	0	0	0
135.	Darius Boyd	(Australia)	2009–11	Rd. 1	Brisbane Broncos	Fullback	69	13	0	0	52
136.	Luke Priddis	(Australia)	2009–10	Rd. 1	Penrith Panthers	Hooker	30	1	0	0	4
137.	Jeremy Smith	(New Zealand)	2009–10	Rd. 1	Melbourne Storm	Lock	30	5	0	0	20
138.	Michael Weyman	(Australia)	2009–13	Rd. 1	Canberra Raiders	Prop	93	9	0	0	36
139.	Neville Costigan	(Papua New Guinea) (Australia)	2009–10	Rd. 2	Canberra Raiders	Lock	42	5	0	0	20
140.	Nick Emmett	(Australia)	2009–10	Rd. 9	Brisbane Broncos	Centre	24	2	0	0	8
141.	Mickey Paea	(Australia) (Tonga)	2009	Rd. 9	Sydney Roosters	Prop	6	0	0	0	0
142.	Trent Merrin	(Australia)	2009–15, 2020–21	Rd. 12	Debut	Lock	152	12	0	0	48
143.	Nathan Fien	(Australia) (New Zealand)	2009–13	Rd. 18	New Zealand Warriors	Hooker	80	7	0	0	28
144.	Michael Greenfield	(Australia)	2010–11	Rd. 6	South Sydney Rabbitohs	Prop	12	0	0	0	0
145.	Kalifa Faifai Loa	(New Zealand) (Samoa)	2010, 2016–17	Rd. 11	Debut, Gold Coast Titans	Wing	15	8	0	0	32
146.	Jake Marketo	(Australia)	2010–2017	Rd. 11	Debut	Second-row	51	5	0	0	20
147.	Kyle Stanley	(Australia) (Samoa) (New Zealand)	2010–14	Rd. 11	Debut	Five-eighth	46	17	15	0	98
148.	Cameron King	(Australia)	2010, 2012–13	Rd. 26	Debut	Hooker	17	1	0	0	2
149.	Mitch Rein	(Australia)	2011–16	Rd. 1	Debut	Hooker	85	14	0	0	56
150.	Adam Cuthbertson	(Australia)	2011	Rd. 3	Cronulla-Sutherland Sharks	Second-row	19	2	0	0	8
151.	David Gower	(Australia)	2011–12	Rd. 3	Wests Tigers	Prop	7	0	0	0	0
152.	Jack Bosden	(Australia)	2011	Rd. 9	Debut	Prop	4	0	0	0	0
153.	Bronx Goodwin	(Australia) (New Zealand)	2011–12	Rd. 9	Cronulla-Sutherland Sharks	Fullback	5	2	0	0	8
154.	Peni Tagive	(Australia) (Fiji)	2011	Rd. 9	Wests Tigers	Wing	5	3	0	0	12
155.	Alex McKinnon	(Australia)	2011	Rd. 14	Debut	Lock	3	2	0	0	8
156.	Jack de Belin	(Australia)	2011–25	Rd. 16	Debut	Lock	254	19	0	0	76
157.	Leeson Ah Mau	(New Zealand) (Samoa)	2012–18	Rd. 1	North Queensland Cowboys	Prop, Second-row	144	4	1	0	18
158.	Jeremy Latimore	(Australia)	2012, 2018–19	Rd. 1	New Zealand Warriors, Cronulla-Sutherland Sharks	Prop	57	2	0	0	8
159.	Nathan Green	(Australia)	2012–14	Rd. 2	Debut	Centre	17	4	0	0	16
160.	Daniel Vidot	(Australia) (Samoa)	2012–13	Rd. 3	Canberra Raiders	Wing	35	14	0	0	56
161.	Josh Miller	(Australia)	2012	Rd. 8	Canberra Raiders	Prop	9	1	0	0	4
162.	Atelea Vea	(Tonga)	2012–13	Rd. 10	Melbourne Storm	Second-row	3	0	0	0	0
163.	Jack Stockwell	(Australia)	2012–14	Rd. 11	Debut	Prop	35	2	0	0	8
164.	Will Matthews	(Australia)	2012–17	Rd. 21	Gold Coast Titans	Prop	60	4	0	0	16
165.	Gerard Beale	(Australia) (New Zealand)	2013–14, 2021	Rd. 1	Brisbane Broncos	Fullback	39	14	0	0	56
166.	Tyson Frizell	(Australia) (Wales)	2013–20	Rd. 1	Cronulla-Sutherland Sharks	Second-row	165	23	0	0	92
167.	Bronson Harrison	(New Zealand)	2013–14	Rd. 1	Canberra Raiders	Second-row	34	1	0	0	4
168.	Josh Drinkwater	(Australia)	2013	Rd. 5	Debut	Halfback	4	0	0	1	1
169.	Damien Cook	(Australia)	2013, 2025–	Rd. 6	Debut	Hooker	37	3	0	0	12
170.	Adam Quinlan	(Australia)	2013–14	Rd. 9	Debut	Fullback	25	8	0	0	32
171.	Josh Dugan	(Australia)	2013–17	Rd. 10	Canberra Raiders	Fullback	84	28	17	0	146
172.	Charly Runciman	(Australia)	2013–14	Rd. 16	Debut	Centre	10	4	0	0	16
173.	Craig Garvey	(Australia)	2013–14	Rd. 17	Debut	Hooker	3	0	0	0	0
174.	Michael Cooper	(England)	2014–15	Rd. 1	Warrington Wolves	Prop	24	1	0	0	4
175.	Dylan Farrell	(Australia)	2014–15	Rd. 1	South Sydney Rabbitohs	Centre	7	1	0	0	4
176.	Joel Thompson	(Australia)	2014–17	Rd. 1	Canberra Raiders	Second-row	85	18	0	0	72
177.	Gareth Widdop	(England)	2014–19	Rd. 1	Melbourne Storm	Five-eighth	124	33	387	6	912
178.	Michael Witt	(Australia)	2014	Rd. 1	London Broncos	Halfback	4	1	0	0	4
179.	Sam Williams	(Australia)	2014	Rd. 2	Canberra Raiders	Halfback	4	0	0	0	0
180.	Benji Marshall	(New Zealand)	2014–15	Rd. 10	Wests Tigers	Five-eighth	16	3	0	0	12
181.	Peter Mata'utia	(Australia) (Samoa)	2014–16	Rd. 10	Newcastle Knights	Fullback	9	3	0	0	12
182.	Shane Pumipi	(New Zealand)	2014	Rd. 12	Debut	Hooker	8	0	0	0	0
183.	Eto Nabuli	(Fiji)	2015	Rd. 1	Debut	Wing	1	1	0	0	4
184.	Dane Nielsen	(Australia)	2015	Rd. 1	New Zealand Warriors	Centre	1	0	0	0	0
185.	Rory O'Brien	(Australia)	2015	Rd. 1	Debut	Prop	1	0	0	0	0
186.	George Rose	(Australia)	2015	Rd. 1	Melbourne Storm	Prop	1	0	0	0	0
187.	Heath L'Estrange	(Australia) (France)	2015	Rd. 2	Sydney Roosters	Hooker	1	0	0	0	0
188.	Euan Aitken	(Australia) (Scotland)	2015–20	Rd. 3	Debut	Centre	121	39	0	0	156
189.	Yaw Kiti Glymin	(Australia)	2015	Rd. 17	Debut	Wing	1	0	0	0	0
190.	Mark Ioane	(New Zealand)	2015	Rd. 17	Gold Coast Titans	Prop	1	1	0	0	4
191.	Justin Hunt	(Australia)	2015	Rd. 17	Parramatta Eels	Fullback	1	0	0	0	0
192.	Luke Page	(Australia) (Papua New Guinea)	2015	Rd. 17	Debut	Prop	1	0	0	0	0
193.	Drew Hutchison	(Australia)	2015–17	Rd. 18	Debut	Halfback	1	0	0	0	0
194.	Siliva Havili	(New Zealand) (Tonga)	2016–17	Rd. 1	New Zealand Warriors	Hooker	1	0	0	0	0
195.	Tim Lafai	(Samoa)	2016–20	Rd. 1	Canterbury-Bankstown Bulldogs	Centre	91	18	19	0	110
196.	Dunamis Lui	(Australia) (Samoa)	2016	Rd. 1	Manly Warringah Sea Eagles	Prop	1	0	0	0	0
197.	Kurt Mann	(Australia)	2016–18	Rd. 1	Melbourne Storm	Centre, Halfback, Fullback	60	20	0	0	80
198.	Russell Packer	(New Zealand)	2016–17	Rd. 1	New Zealand Warriors	Prop	41	1	0	0	4
199.	Josh McCrone	(Australia)	2016–17	Rd. 3	Canberra Raiders	Halfback	5	0	0	0	0
200.	Taane Milne	(New Zealand)	2016–17	Rd. 8	Debut	Centre	1	0	0	0	0
201.	Jacob Host	(Australia)	2016–20	Rd. 9	Debut	Prop	51	5	0	0	20
202.	Tariq Sims	(Australia) (Fiji)	2016–22	Rd. 15	Newcastle Knights	Prop, Second-row	123	23	0	0	92
203.	Tyrone McCarthy	(England) (Republic of Ireland)	2016	Rd. 20	Hull Kingston Rovers	Second-row	1	0	0	0	0
204.	Luciano Leilua	(Australia) (Samoa)	2016–19, 2024–	Rd. 22	Debut	Second-row	94	13	0	0	52
205.	Jai Field	(Australia)	2017–19	Rd. 1	Debut	Fullback, Halfback	11	1	4	0	12
206.	Nene Macdonald	(Papua New Guinea)	2017–18	Rd. 1	Gold Coast Titans	Wing	46	16	0	0	64
207.	Cameron McInnes	(Australia)	2017–20	Rd. 1	South Sydney Rabbitohs	Hooker, Lock	91	11	0	0	44
208.	Paul Vaughan	(Australia) (Italy)	2017–21	Rd. 1	Canberra Raiders	Prop	96	13	0	0	52
209.	Hame Sele	(Australia) (Tonga)	2017–18, 2024–	Rd. 6	Debut	Prop	40	0	0	0	0
210.	Blake Lawrie	(Australia)	2017–	Rd. 17	Debut	Prop	166	3	0	0	12
211.	Matthew Dufty	(Australia)	2017–21	Rd. 20	Debut	Fullback	82	44	0	0	176
212.	James Graham	(England)	2018–20	Rd. 1	Canterbury-Bankstown Bulldogs	Prop	51	1	0	0	4
213.	Ben Hunt	(Australia)	2018–24	Rd. 1	Brisbane Broncos	Halfback	147	39	5	1	167
214.	Reece Robson	(Australia)	2018–19	Rd. 9	Debut	Hooker	9	0	0	0	0
215.	Zac Lomax	(Australia)	2018–24	Rd. 10	Debut	Centre, Fullback	114	49	315	3	831
216.	Darren Nicholls	(New Zealand)	2018–19	Rd. 17	Debut	Halfback	3	0	0	0	0
217.	Jordan Pereira	(New Zealand)	2018–21	Rd. 19	Debut	Fullback, Wing	39	10	0	0	40
218.	Corey Norman	(Australia)	2019–21	Rd. 1	Parramatta Eels	Five-eighth	59	9	34	4	108
219.	Mikaele Ravalawa	(Fiji)	2019–4	Rd. 1	Debut	Wing	96	67	0	0	268
220.	Josh Kerr	(Australia)	2019–23, 2026–	Rd. 2	Debut	Prop, Second-row	77	5	0	0	20
221.	Korbin Sims	(Fiji)	2019–20	Rd. 3	Brisbane Broncos	Second-row	21	2	0	0	8
222.	Jonus Pearson	(Australia)	2019	Rd. 11	Brisbane Broncos	Wing	10	2	0	0	8
223.	Lachlan Maranta	(Australia)	2019	Rd. 14	Brisbane Broncos	Centre	2	0	0	0	0
224.	Mitchell Allgood	(Australia)	2019	Rd. 16	Wakefield Trinity	Prop	1	0	0	0	0
225.	Patrick Kaufusi	(Tonga)	2019	Rd. 16	Melbourne Storm	Prop	6	0	0	0	0
226.	Jason Saab	(Australia)	2019–20	Rd. 19	Debut	Wing	7	3	0	0	12
227.	Jackson Ford	(Australia)	2019–22	Rd. 21	Debut	Second-row	33	2	0	0	8
228.	Tristan Sailor	(Australia)	2019–20	Rd. 23	Debut	Halfback, Fullback	6	1	0	0	4
229.	Billy Brittain	(Australia)	2020–21	Rd. 1	South Sydney Rabbitohs	Hooker	5	0	0	0	0
230.	Tyrell Fuimaono	(Australia)	2020–22	Rd. 1	Penrith Panthers	Second-row	40	2	0	0	8
231.	Issac Luke	(New Zealand)	2020	Rd. 1	New Zealand Warriors	Hooker	3	0	0	0	0
232.	Brayden Wiliame	(Fiji)	2020–21	Rd. 1	Catalans Dragons	Wing, Centre	17	6	0	0	24
233.	Adam Clune	(Australia)	2020–21	Rd. 4	Debut	Halfback, Five-eighth	25	1	0	0	4
234.	Kaide Ellis	(Australia)	2020–21	Rd. 13	Penrith Panthers	Prop, Second-row	18	0	0	0	0
235.	Cody Ramsey	(Australia)	2020–22	Rd. 18	Debut	Fullback, Wing	36	14	0	0	56
236.	Max Feagai	(New Zealand)	2020–24	Rd. 19	Debut	Centre	23	3	0	0	12
237.	Eddie Blacker	(Australia)	2020	Rd. 20	Debut	Prop	1	0	0	0	0
238.	Jayden Sullivan	(Australia)	2020–23	Rd. 20	Debut	Five-eighth, Second-row	29	7	3	0	34
239.	Daniel Alvaro	(Australia) (Italy)	2021	Rd. 1	Parramatta Eels	Second-row	19	0	0	0	0
240.	Jack Bird	(Australia)	2021–24	Rd. 1	Brisbane Broncos	Centre, Second-row	73	17	8	0	84
241.	Poasa Faamausili	(New Zealand)	2021	Rd. 1	Sydney Roosters	Second-row	11	0	0	0	0
242.	Andrew McCullough	(Australia)	2021–22	Rd. 1	Newcastle Knights	Hooker	41	2	0	0	8
243.	Josh McGuire	(Australia)	2021–22	Rd. 6	North Queensland Cowboys	Prop, Lock	27	2	0	0	8
244.	Billy Burns	(Australia)	2021–23	Rd. 7	Penrith Panthers	Second-row	29	5	0	0	20
245.	Junior Amone	(Australia)	2021–23	Rd. 9	Debut	Second-row	54	10	0	0	40
246.	Mat Feagai	(New Zealand) (Samoa)	2021–	Rd. 9	Debut	Centre, Wing	74	27	0	0	108
247.	Jaiyden Hunt	(Australia)	2021–23	Rd. 11	Debut	Prop	14	1	0	0	4
248.	Tyrell Sloan	(Australia)	2021–	Rd. 11	Debut	Fullback	85	49	0	0	196
249.	Jamayne Taunoa-Brown	(Australia)	2021	Rd. 18	New Zealand Warriors	Prop	2	0	0	0	0
250.	Freddy Lussick	(Australia)	2021	Rd. 24	Sydney Roosters	Hooker	2	0	0	0	0
251.	Jack Gosiewski	(Australia)	2022	Rd. 1	Manly Warringah Sea Eagles	Second-row	4	1	0	0	4
252.	Moses Mbye	(Australia)	2022–23	Rd. 1	Wests Tigers	Hooker, Five-eighth	37	2	1	0	10
253.	Francis Molo	(New Zealand)	2022–24	Rd. 1	North Queensland Cowboys	Prop	52	3	0	0	12
254.	Jaydn Su'a	(New Zealand)	2022–	Rd. 1	South Sydney Rabbitohs	Second-row	78	23	0	0	92
255.	Moses Suli	(Tonga)	2022–	Rd. 1	Manly Warringah Sea Eagles	Centre	85	13	0	0	52
256.	Aaron Woods	(Australia)	2022–23	Rd. 1	Cronulla-Sutherland Sharks	Prop	19	0	0	0	0
257.	George Burgess	(England)	2022	Rd. 2	Wigan Warriors	Prop	4	0	0	0	0
258.	Michael Molo	(Australia)	2022–25	Rd. 11	Debut	Prop	36	2	0	0	8
259.	Tautau Moga	(Samoa)	2022–24	Rd. 12	South Sydney Rabbitohs	Centre, Wing	13	13	0	0	52
260.	Jonathon Reuben	(Australia)	2022	Rd. 14	Debut	Centre, Wing	1	0	0	0	0
261.	Toby Couchman	(Australia)	2023–	Rd. 2	Debut	Second-row	49	4	0	0	16
262.	Jacob Liddle	(Australia)	2023–	Rd. 2	Wests Tigers	Hooker	72	18	0	0	72
263.	Ben Murdoch-Masila	(Tonga)	2023–25	Rd. 2	New Zealand Warriors	Second-row	36	0	0	0	0
264.	Zane Musgrove	(Samoa)	2023	Rd. 2	Wests Tigers	Prop	11	1	0	0	4
265.	Daniel Russell	(Papua New Guinea)	2023–24	Rd. 19	Debut	Second-row	8	0	0	0	0
266.	Paul Turner	(New Zealand)	2023	Rd. 19	Gold Coast Titans	Fullback	1	0	0	0	0
267.	Connor Muhleisen	(Australia)	2023–	Rd. 22	Debut	Hooker	9	0	0	0	0
268.	Ryan Couchman	(Australia)	2023–	Rd. 23	Debut	Second-row	19	0	0	0	0
269.	Sione Finau	(Australia)	2023–25	Rd. 26	Debut	Wing	7	4	0	0	16
270.	Tom Eisenhuth	(Australia)	2024–25	Rd. 1	Melbourne Storm	Second-row, Lock	14	1	0	0	4
271.	Raymond Faitala-Mariner	(Australia) (Samoa)	2024–25	Rd. 1	Canterbury-Bankstown Bulldogs	Second-row	24	1	0	0	4
272.	Viliami Fifita	(Australia)	2024–25	Rd. 1	Debut	Prop	4	0	0	0	0
273.	Kyle Flanagan	(Australia)	2024–	Rd. 1	Canterbury-Bankstown Bulldogs	Five-eighth	52	12	44	0	136
274.	Jesse Marschke	(Australia)	2024	Rd. 3	Debut	Hooker	5	0	0	0	0
275.	Fa'amanu Brown	(New Zealand) (Samoa)	2024	Rd. 7	Hull F.C.	Hooker	5	0	0	0	0
276.	Christian Tuipulotu	(Tonga)	2024–	Rd. 7	Manly Sea Eagles	Wing	30	19	0	0	76
277.	Lykhan King-Togia	(Australia)	2024–	Rd. 24	Debut	Five-eighth	24	3	0	0	12
278.	Savelio Tamale	(Australia)	2024	Rd. 24	Debut	Wing	1	0	0	0	0
279.	Emre Guler	(Australia)	2025–	Rd. 1	Canberra Raiders	Prop	28	3	0	0	12
280.	Clinton Gutherson	(Australia)	2025–	Rd. 1	Parramatta Eels	Fullback	32	8	0	0	32
281.	Valentine Holmes	(Australia) (Cook Islands)	2025–	Rd. 1	North Queensland Cowboys	Centre	25	8	67	0	166
282.	Lachlan Ilias	(Greece)	2025	Rd. 1	South Sydney Rabbitohs	Halfback	7	0	0	0	0
283.	Hamish Stewart	(Australia)	2025–	Rd. 1	Debut	Lock	30	3	0	0	12
284.	Dylan Egan	(Australia)	2025–	Rd. 4	Debut	Second-row	11	3	0	0	12
285.	David Klemmer	(Australia)	2025	Rd. 4	Wests Tigers	Prop	22	0	0	0	0
286.	Corey Allan	(Australia)	2025	Rd. 9	Sydney Roosters	Fullback	12	5	0	0	20
287.	Loko Pasifiki Tonga	(New Zealand)	2025–	Rd. 10	Debut	Prop	15	1	0	0	4
288.	Nathan Lawson	(Australia)	2025–	Rd. 13	Debut	Wing	4	2	0	0	8
289.	Nick Tsougranis	(Greece)	2025–	Rd. 15	Debut	Second-row	1	0	0	0	0
290.	Hayden Buchanan	(Australia)	2025–	Rd. 23	Debut	Centre	8	1	0	0	4
291.	Jacob Halangahu	(Australia)	2025–	Rd. 23	Debut	Prop	9	0	0	0	0
292.	Daniel Atkinson	(Italy)	2026–	Rd. 1	Cronulla-Sutherland Sharks	Wing	10	0	0	0	0
293.	Setu Tu	(Samoa)	2026–	Rd. 1	Debut	Wing	9	5	0	0	20
294.	David Fale	(New Zealand)	2026–	Rd. 5	Penrith Panthers	Wing	2	0	0	0	0
295.	Kade Reed	(Australia)	2026–	Rd. 8	Debut	Halfback	2	0	0	0	0

=== Women's ===
Updated to Round 3 of the 2021 NRL Women's season

Cap no.	Name	Nationality	Dragons career	Debut round	Previous club	Position	Appearances	Tries	Goals	Field goals	Points
1.	Sam Bremner	(Australia)	2018, 2020	Rd. 1	Debut	Fullback	4	1	0	0	4
2.	Rikeya Horne	(Australia)	2018–20	Rd. 1	Debut	Wing	7	1	0	0	4
3.	Jessica Sergis	(Australia)	2018–20	Rd. 1	Debut	Centre	10	5	0	0	20
4.	Honey Hireme	(New Zealand)	2018	Rd. 1	Debut	Centre	3	1	0	0	4
5.	Shakiah Tungai	(Australia)	2018–20	Rd. 1	Debut	Wing	8	3	3	0	18
6.	Melanie Howard	(Australia)	2018	Rd. 1	Debut	Five-eighth	3	0	0	0	0
7.	Raecene McGregor	(New Zealand)	2018	Rd. 1	Debut	Halfback	3	0	0	0	0
8.	Teina Clark	(Australia)	2018	Rd. 1	Debut	Prop	3	0	0	0	0
9.	Anneka Stephens	(New Zealand)	2018	Rd. 1	Debut	Hooker	3	0	0	0	0
10.	Asoiva Karpani	(Australia)	2018	Rd. 1	Debut	Prop	1	0	0	0	0
11.	Kezie Apps	(Australia)	2018–	Rd. 1	Debut	Second-row	10	1	0	0	4
12.	Holli Wheeler	(Australia)	2018–19, 2021-	Rd. 1	Debut	Second-row	10	0	0	0	0
13.	Annette Brander	(Australia)	2018	Rd. 1	Debut	Lock	3	0	0	0	0
14.	Keeley Davis	(Australia)	2018–	Rd. 1	Debut	Hooker	13	0	0	0	0
15.	Oneata Schwalger	(Samoa) (Australia)	2018	Rd. 1	Debut	Prop	3	0	0	0	0
16.	Hannah Southwell	(Australia)	2018	Rd. 1	Debut	Lock	3	0	0	0	0
17.	Asipau Mafi	(Australia)	2018	Rd. 1	Debut	Prop	3	0	0	0	0
18.	Talesha Quinn	(Australia)	2018	Rd. 2	Debut	Second-row	2	0	0	0	0
19.	Kate Haren	(Australia)	2018	Rd. 2	Debut	Second-row	2	0	0	0	0
20.	Botille Vette-Welsh	(Australia)	2019	Rd. 1	Sydney Roosters	Fullback	4	1	0	0	4
21.	Stephanie Mooka	(Australia)	2019	Rd. 1	Debut	Wing	1	0	0	0	0
22.	Tiana Penitani	(Australia)	2019–20	Rd. 1	Debut	Centre	6	3	0	0	12
23.	Kimiora Nati	(New Zealand)	2019	Rd. 1	Brisbane Broncos	Five-eighth	1	0	0	0	0
24.	Maddie Studdon	(Australia)	2019–20	Rd. 1	Sydney Roosters	Halfback	6	0	8	0	16
25.	Teuila Fotu-Moala	(New Zealand)	2019	Rd. 1	Brisbane Broncos	Prop	1	0	0	0	0
26.	Brittany Breayley	(Australia)	2019	Rd. 1	Brisbane Broncos	Hooker	4	0	0	0	0
27.	Maitua Feterika	(New Zealand)	2019	Rd. 1	Brisbane Broncos	Second-row	4	1	0	0	4
28.	Shaylee Bent	(Australia)	2019–	Rd. 1	Debut	Second-row	9	2	0	0	8
29.	Takilele Katoa	(New Zealand)	2019	Rd. 1	Debut	Prop	4	0	0	0	0
30.	Maddison Weatherall	(New Zealand)	2019–20	Rd. 1	Brisbane Broncos	Prop	5	0	0	0	0
31.	Ngatokotoru Arakua	(New Zealand)	2019	Rd. 1	Debut	Prop	4	0	0	0	0
32.	Najvada George	(Australia)	2019	Rd. 2	Debut	Second-row	3	0	0	0	0
33.	Aaliyah Fasavalu-Fa'amausili	(Australia)	2019–20	Rd. 2	Debut	Lock	6	1	0	0	4
34.	Isabelle Kelly	(Australia)	2020	Rd. 1	Sydney Roosters	Centre	2	0	0	0	0
35.	Jaime Chapman	(Australia)	2020–	Rd. 1	Debut	Wing	5	0	0	0	0
36.	Steph Hancock	(Australia)	2020	Rd. 1	Brisbane Broncos	Prop	3	0	0	0	0
37.	Elsie Albert	(Papua New Guinea)	2020–	Rd. 1	Debut	Prop	6	1	0	0	4
38.	Ellie Johnston	(Australia)	2020	Rd. 1	Debut	Prop	3	0	0	0	0
39.	Christine Pauli	(Samoa)	2020	Rd. 1	Debut	Prop	3	0	0	0	0
40.	Talei Holmes	(Fiji)	2020–	Rd. 1	Debut	Second-row	4	0	0	0	0
41.	Mahalia Murphy	(Australia)	2020	Rd. 1	Debut	Wing	3	0	0	0	0
42.	Georgia Page	(Australia)	2020	Rd. 3	Debut	Second-row	2	0	0	0	0
43.	Teagan Berry	(Australia)	2020–	Rd. 3	Debut	Wing	4	3	1	0	14
44.	Jade Etherden	(Australia)	2020	Rd. 3	Debut	Prop	1	0	0	0	0
45.	Emma Tonegato	(Australia)	2021–	Rd.1	Debut	Fullback	3	0	0	0	0
46.	Page McGregor	(Australia)	2021–	Rd.1	Debut	Centre	3	0	0	0	0
47.	Madison Bartlett	(New Zealand)	2021–	Rd.1	New Zealand Warriors	Wing	2	1	0	0	4
48.	Taliah Fuimaono	(Australia)	2021–	Rd.1	Debut	Five-eighth	3	0	0	0	0
49.	Rachael Pearson	(Australia)	2021–	Rd.1	Debut	Halfback	3	1	8	0	20
50.	Quincy Dodd	(Australia)	2021–	Rd.1	Sydney Roosters	Hooker	3	1	0	0	4
51.	Kody House	(Australia)	2021–	Rd.1	Brisbane Broncos	Centre	2	0	0	0	0
52.	Tegan Dymock	(England)	2021–	Rd.1	Debut	Lock	3	0	0	0	0
53.	Janelle Williams	(Australia)	2021–	Rd.1	Debut	Prop	3	0	0	0	0
54.	Keele Browne	(Australia)	2021–	Rd.2	Debut	Centre	2	1	0	0	4
55.	Aliti Namoce-Sagano	(Fiji)	2021–	Rd.2	Debut	Prop	2	0	0	0	0
56.	Renee Targett	(Australia)	2021–	Rd.2	Debut	Halfback	2	0	0	0	0
57.	Chantel Tugaga	(Australia)	2021–	Rd.3	Debut	Second-row	1	0	0	0	0
