= Andrew G. McBride =

American lawyer (1960–2022)

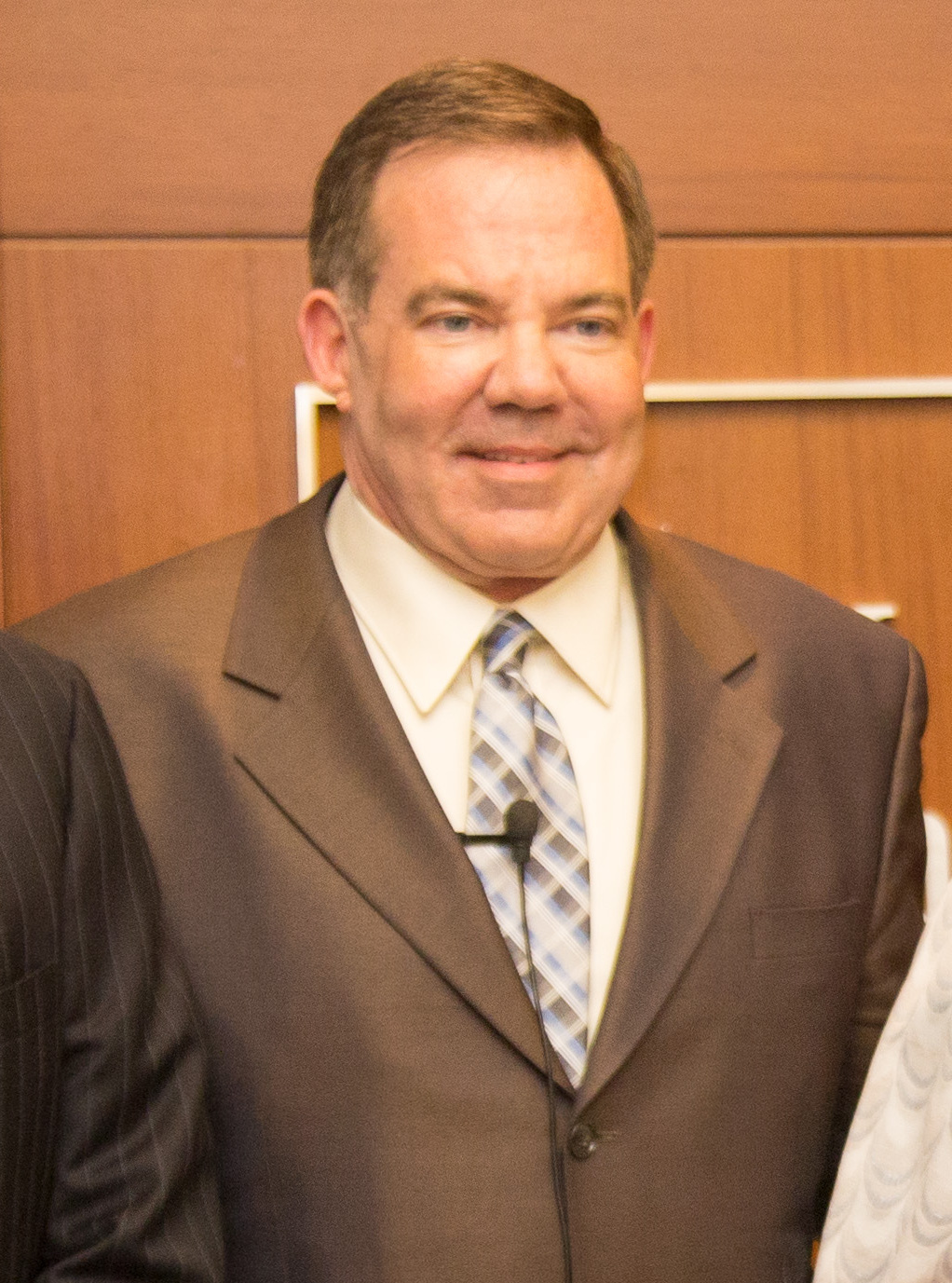

Assistant United States Attorney for the Eastern District of Virginia
- In office 1992–2000

Personal details
- Born: June 26, 1960 Paterson, New Jersey, U.S.
- Died: April 29, 2022 (aged 61)
- Education: College of the Holy Cross (BA); Stanford University (JD)

Andrew Gerald McBride Jr. (June 26, 1960 – April 29, 2022) was an American lawyer who served as the assistant United States attorney for the Eastern District of Virginia from 1992 to 2000.

== Early life and education ==
McBride was born on June 26, 1960, to Andrew Gerald and Patricia McBride in Paterson, New Jersey. He grew up in Glen Rock. He played football for Bergen Catholic High School in Oradell, New Jersey, and was a National Merit Scholarship Program semi-finalist in high school.

After high school, McBride graduated from the College of the Holy Cross with a Bachelor of Arts, magna cum laude, in political science in 1982. He then was awarded a Rotary Scholarship to study in Paris, France, and Rabat, Morocco. Afterwards he earned his Juris Doctor (J.D.) in 1987 with high honors from Stanford Law School, where he graduated second in his class and was a member of the Order of the Coif.

== Early career ==
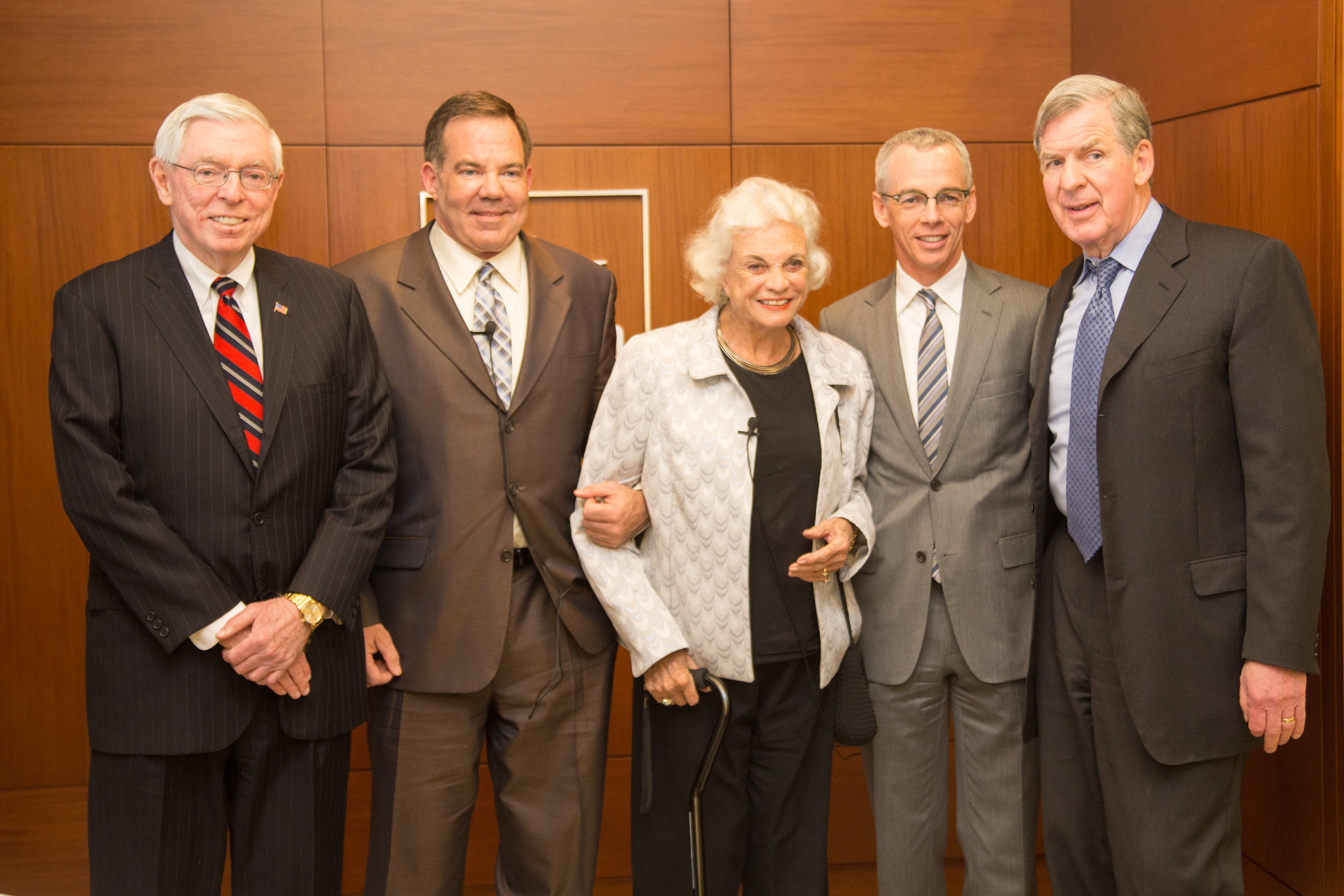
Andrew G. McBride with Sandra Day O’Connor

McBride served as a law clerk to Judge Robert Bork of the United States Court of Appeals for the District of Columbia Circuit from 1987 to 1988, a period that overlapped with Bork's nomination to the Supreme Court. He helped edit Bork's 1990 book The Tempting of America.

From 1988 to 1989, McBride clerked for Justice Sandra Day O'Connor at the U.S. Supreme Court. In the 1989 book Closed Chambers, author Edward Lazarus, who clerked for Justice Harry Blackmun during the 1988–89 term, named McBride as the leader of a "conservative cabal" of Supreme Court law clerks that included Miguel Estrada, Paul Cappuccio, Thomas Hungar and R. Hewitt Pate. He arranged for Wiley Rein to host a 2013 book-tour event for Justice O'Connor for her book Out of Order: Stories from the History of the Supreme Court.

== Department of Justice ==
From 1989 to 1992, McBride served in the United States Department of Justice under Attorneys General Dick Thornburgh and William P. Barr. He worked on national security issues, including the use of military tribunals to try terrorists and the capture and trial of Manuel Noriega. He also argued the case of United States v. Alvarez-Machain, involving the kidnapping of Dr. Machain from Mexico to stand trial in the United States for the murder of Enrique Camarena (DEA agent). From 1992 to 1999, he served as Assistant U.S. Attorney in the United States District Court for the Eastern District of Virginia, the so-called "Rocket Docket".

McBride was one of the lead prosecutors on the 1996 case of the Sugar Bottom Murders, a triple-murder carried out by a Jamaican drug gang known as the Poison Clan. The trial resulted in murder convictions for all four defendants involved, though the jury refused to give the death penalty. He was also lead prosecutor in the Otto von Bressensdorf affair (1998), in which a German man claiming to be a baron and financier fleeced investors out of millions of dollars. Von Bressendsdorf and his wife were convicted of 27 counts each of mail fraud, conspiracy, and money laundering, and sentenced to more than 11 years in prison.

== Professional life ==
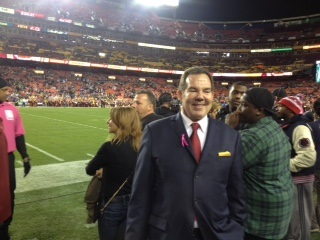
McBride at Redskins game

In 2019, McBride became a partner at McGuireWoods in its Government Investigations & White Collar Department. He was previously at Perkins Coie and Wiley Rein. At Wiley, he served as chairman of its Communications group. In RIAA v. Verizon (2003), McBride won an early privacy ruling in the United States Court of Appeals for the District of Columbia Circuit rejecting attempts by the Recording Industry Association of America to use Digital Millennium Copyright Act; In CTIA – The Wireless Association v. San Francisco (2012), won a decision from the United States Court of Appeals for the Ninth Circuit invalidating a city ordinance requiring radio-frequency emissions warnings for mobile phones. McBride, representing a group of law professors as amici curiae, proposed the statutory theory under the Federal Arbitration Act that was adopted by Justice Clarence Thomas in AT&T Mobility v. Concepcion (2011).

McBride represented Washington Redskins owner Daniel Snyder’s broadcast company, Red Zebra Broadcasting, which owns radio station WWXX-FM (ESPN FM 94) in renewing its license when faced with a petition alleging use of team's name is a "derogatory racist word," its repeated use on the air "is akin to broadcasting obscenity" in violation of federal law. The FCC dismissed claims that Red Zebra lacks the character qualifications required to hold an FCC license.

== Personal life ==
McBride married Elizabeth Alden in 1998. They had two daughters, Caroline and Allison. McBride was a cyclist and completed cross-country biking trips in his spare time. He was fluent in French and was proficient in conversational Arabic. He died on April 29, 2022.

== See also ==
- List of law clerks for the eighth seat of the Supreme Court of the United States
