= War bride (disambiguation) =

A war bride is a foreign woman who married military personnel in times of war.

War bride or War brides may also refer to:

- "War Bride" (Hercules: The Legendary Journeys), episode of television series Hercules: The Legendary Journeys
- War Brides (1916 film), a lost American silent film
- War Brides (1980 film), a Canadian television film
- The War Bride, 2001 Canadian/British drama film

== See also ==
- War (disambiguation)
- Bride (disambiguation)
- War Brides Act, act in the United States which allows alien spouses, natural children, and adopted children of members of the United States Armed Forces to enter the United States as non-quota immigrants
- GI Brides, 2013 book of true war stories about war brides to US soldiers
- G.I. War Brides, 1946 U.S. comedy film
