= Ken Fiebelman =

American politician

Member of the Missouri House of Representatives from the 150th district
- In office January 6, 1993 – January 8, 1997
- Preceded by: Wayne Crump
- Succeeded by: Kelly Parker

Member of the Missouri House of Representatives from the 149th district
- In office January 9, 1985 – January 6, 1993
- Preceded by: David L. Steelman
- Succeeded by: Jerry McBride

Personal details
- Born: December 19, 1941 St. Louis, Missouri
- Died: January 3, 2017 (aged 75) Salem, Missouri
- Party: Democratic

Ken Fiebelman (December 19, 1941 – January 3, 2017) was an American politician who served in the Missouri House of Representatives from 1985 to 1997.

He died on January 3, 2017, in Salem, Missouri at age 75.
