= Andrew McBride =

Andrew McBride may refer to:

- Andy McBride (born 1954), English footballer
- Andrew McBride (lacrosse) (born 1982), Canadian box lacrosse player
- Andrew F. McBride (1869–1946), physician and mayor of Paterson, New Jersey
- Andrew G. McBride (born 1960), American attorney
