= McBride =

McBride may refer to:

- McBride (surname), an Irish surname held by many notable individuals

== Places ==
- Sebree, Kentucky, United States, originally known as McBride
- McBride, Michigan, United States
- McBride, Mississippi, United States
- McBride, Missouri, United States
- McBride, Oklahoma, United States
- McBride, British Columbia, Canada
- McBride Branch, a stream in Indiana, United States
- McBride Range, a mountain range in British Columbia, Canada

== Media ==
- McBride (film series), a 2005 series starring John Larroquette
- McBride's Magazine related to Lippincott's Monthly Magazine and Scribner's Magazine
- Amelia McBride, lead character of the American comic book series Amelia Rules!

== Other ==
- McBride & the Ride, a former country music band from Nashville
- McBride plc, British manufacturer of personal care products
- McBride Secondary School, a high school in British Columbia
- Don McBride Stadium, a baseball ballpark in Richmond, Indiana
- No Man's Land (Eric Bogle song), also known as "Willie McBride"

== See also ==
- McBryde (disambiguation)
- MacBride (disambiguation)
- MacBryde
