= Ryan McBride (disambiguation) =

Ryan McBride (1989-2017) was a Northern Irish association footballer.

Ryan McBride may also refer to:

- Ryan McBride Brandywell Stadium, municipal football stadium in Derry, Northern Ireland
- Ryan McBride (Melrose Place), fictional character in American soap opera Melrose Place

== See also ==
- Rian McBride (born 1996), Irish hurler
