= John William Ballantyne =

Scottish physician and obstetrician

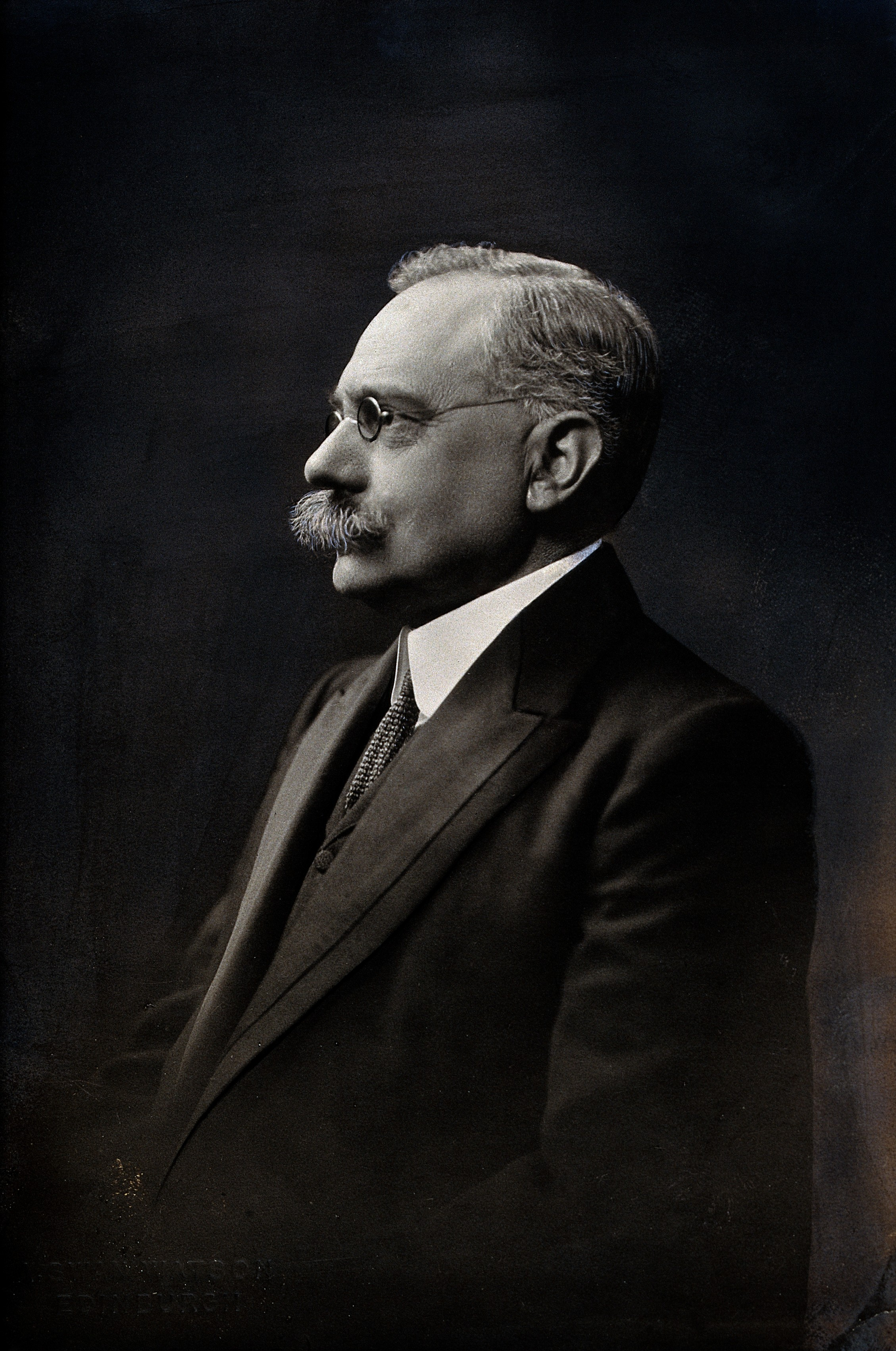
John William Ballantyne

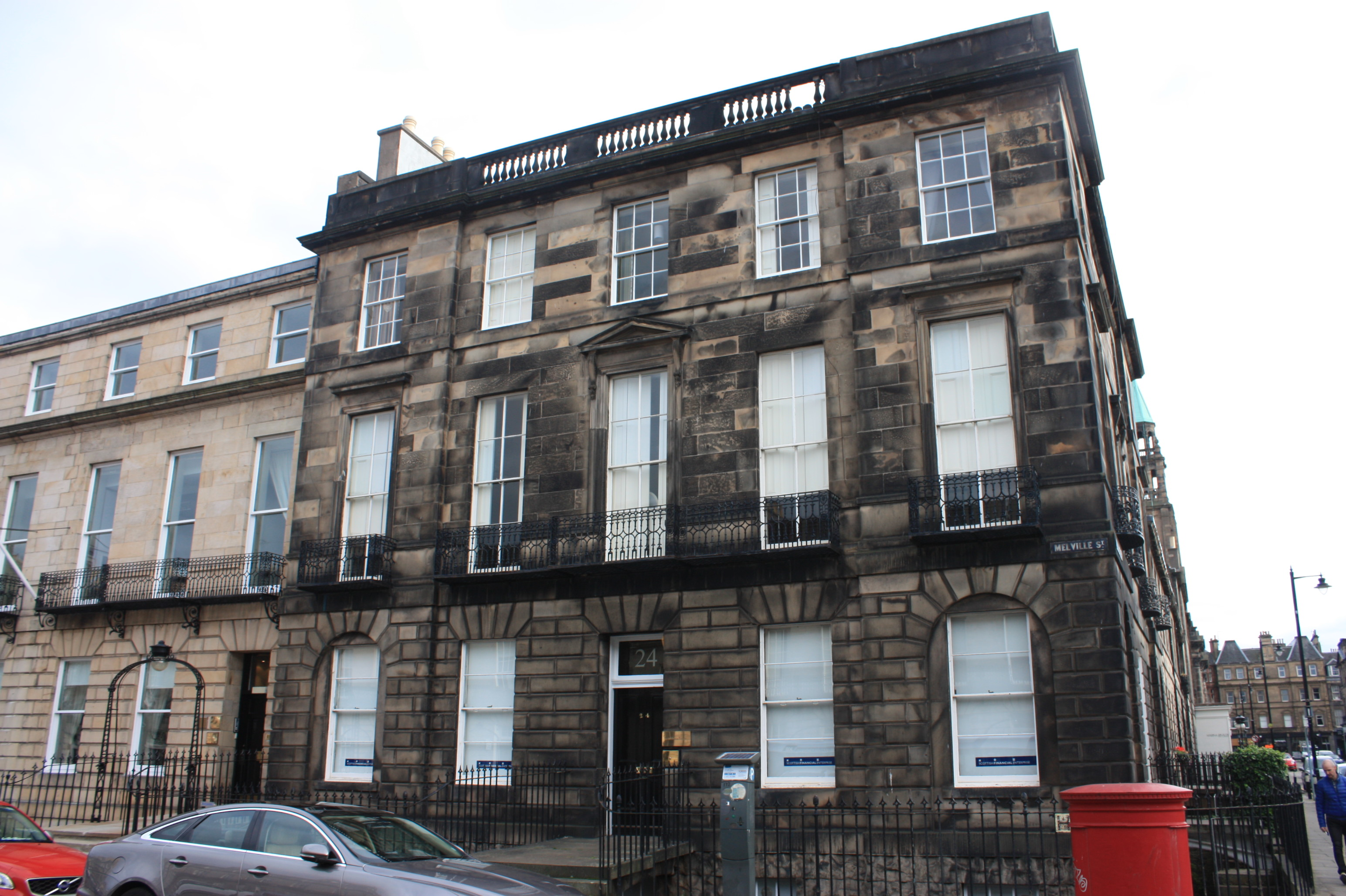
Ballantyne's house at 24 Melville Street, Edinburgh

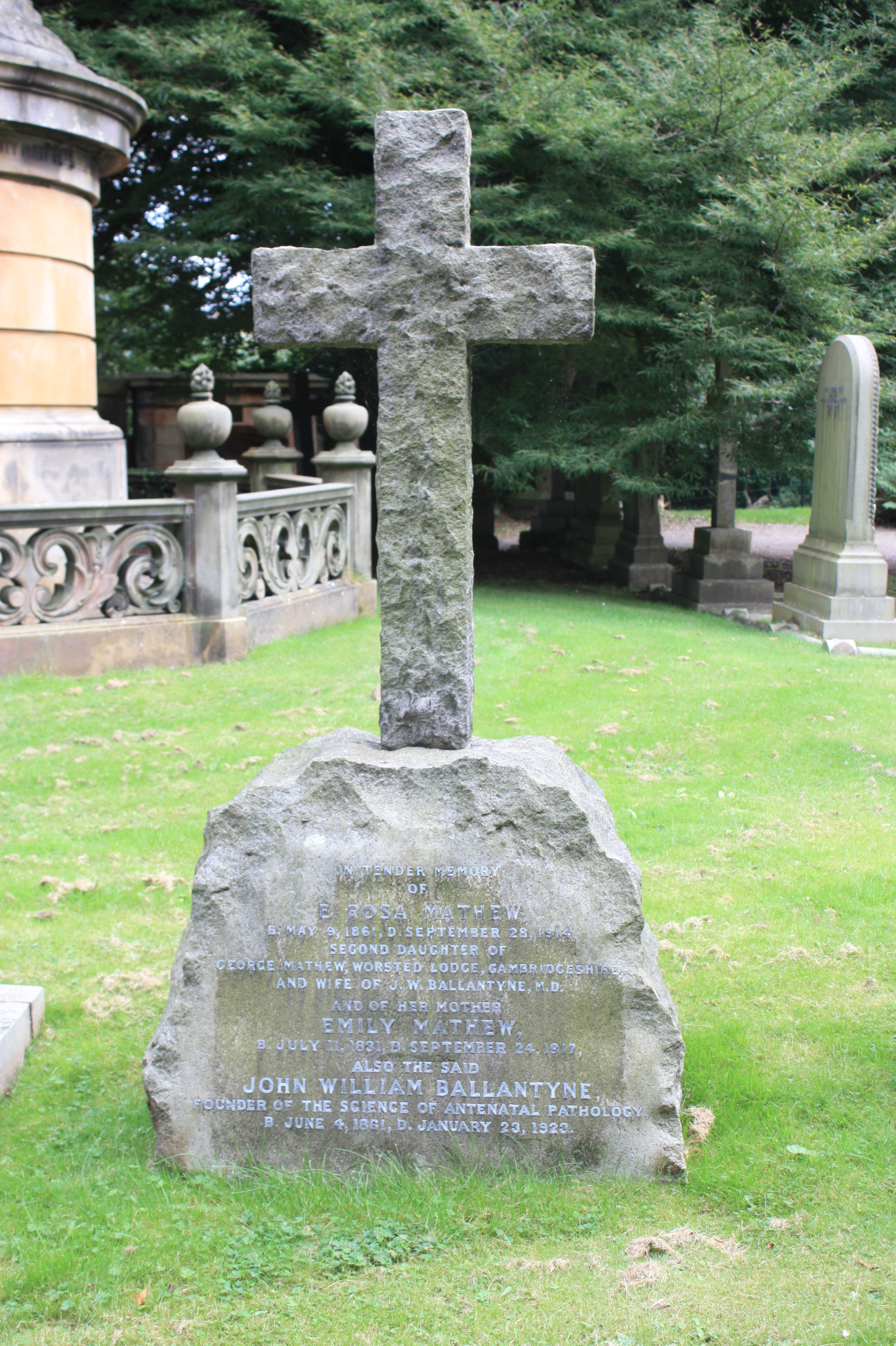
The grave of John William Ballantyne, Dean Cemetery

John William Ballantyne FRSE FRCPE (4 June 1861 – 23 January 1923) was a Scottish physician and obstetrician. In his teaching of female doctors he was a pioneer in the advancement of female professional training in the field of medicine. He made major advances in the field of midwifery in the late 19th and early 20th century, with influences still felt today. He founded the science of antenatal pathology.

== Life ==
He was born in Eskbank near Dalkeith, the son of John Ballantyne, a nurseryman and seedsman, and his wife, Helen Pringle Mercer.

He attended school at George Watson’s College in Edinburgh and thereafter (1880-1889) studied medicine at the University of Edinburgh, serving as a midwifery assistant in his final years. He graduated MB CM in 1883. He was awarded his MD in 1889 for his thesis on the anatomy of the new-born infant.

In 1889 he married Emily Rosa Mathew.

In 1890 he took on an important role of lecturer in Midwifery and Gynaecology at the Edinburgh College of Medicine for Women, a post which he held until 1916. He also taught at the Edinburgh School of Medicine for Women until it closed in 1898. From 1894 to 1900 he also lectured at the University of Edinburgh in antenatal pathology and teratology.

In 1892 he was elected a Fellow of the Royal Society of Edinburgh. His proposers were Sir William Turner, Sir Alexander Russell Simpson, Johnson Symington and Peter McBride.

In 1904 he took the role of Chief Physician at Edinburgh Royal Infirmary. He is listed in the 1908-9 Edinburgh Post Office Directory as living at 24 Melville Street in Edinburgh's west end.

He died on 23 January 1923 in Edinburgh, following the removal of a gangrenous appendix. The British Medical Journal devoted four pages of his merits to the profession within his obituary.

He is buried with his wife, Emily Rosa Mathew (d.1914) in Dean Cemetery in the west of Edinburgh. The grave stands just north of the Buchanan monument in the south-west section.

== Publications ==
- Diseases and Deformities of the Foetus (2 volumes) (1892 and 1895)
- Teratogenesis (1897)
- Manual of Antenatal Pathology and Hygiene (1902-5)
