= Peter McBride =

Peter McBride may refer to:

- Peter McBride (footballer) (1877–1951), Scottish footballer
- Peter McBride (physician) (1854–1946), Scottish physician
- Sir Peter McBride (politician) (1867–1923), Australian politician
- Pete McBride (1875–1944), pitcher in Major League Baseball
- The 1992 killing of Peter McBride in Northern Ireland
