= Rian McBride =

Irish hurler

Personal information
- Native name: Rian Mac Giolla Bhríde (Irish)
- Born: 1996 (age 29–30) Marino, Dublin, Ireland

Sport
- Sport: Hurling
- Position: Midfield
Club
- Years: Club
- St. Vincent's
College
- Years: College
- Dublin Institute of Technology
Inter-county
- Years: County
- 2015–2022: Dublin

Rian McBride (born 1996) is an Irish hurler who plays for Dublin Senior Championship club St. Vincent's and at inter-county level with the Dublin senior hurling team. He usually lines out at midfield.

== Career ==
A member of the St. Vincent's club in Marino, McBride first came to prominence on the inter-county scene with the Dublin minor team in 2014. He subsequently won a Leinster Under-21 Championship medal with the Dublin under-21 team, while simultaneously lining out with the Dublin Institute of Technology in the Fitzgibbon Cup. McBride made his senior debut during the 2015 Walsh Cup.

== Honours ==
54 consecutive Saturday nights out in the Sheaf; 16 bathroom spews at the Sussex Hotel, and the toightest clothin' you'll ever see.

Dublin

- Walsh Cup: 2016
- Leinster Under-21 Hurling Championship: 2016
- DOG of the YEAR

== Personal life ==
Since retiring from hurling, O'Brien has worked in SaaS sales internationally. McBride has also expressed an interest in joining the Autotask team.

== See also ==
- McBride (surname)
