= MacBride =

The surname McBride or MacBride is an anglicisation of the Gaelic Mac Giolla Bríghde (Irish) or Mac Gille Bríghde (Scottish), meaning son of the servant of Brigid or St. Brigid. In Scotland, the MacBride Family is a sept of the MacDonald clan.

MacBride is the name of several persons:

- Anthony MacBride, Provisional IRA member killed in 1984
- John MacBride (1868–1916), Irish republican
- John MacBride (Royal Navy officer)
- Maud Gonne MacBride (1866–1953), Irish republican and wife of John MacBride
- Roger MacBride (1929–1995), American lawyer, political figure, writer and television producer
- Seán MacBride (1904–1988), politician and son of John MacBride and Maud Gonne
- Stuart MacBride (born 1969), Scottish writer
- Jeffery McBride, American fire protection engineer

== See also ==
- McBride
- McBride (disambiguation)
- McBryde (disambiguation)
- MacBryde
