= Robert McBride =

Robert McBride may refer to:

== Politics ==
- Robert McBride (Indiana judge) (1842–1926), Justice of the Indiana Supreme Court
- Robert McBride (politician) (1856–1934), Irish politician
- Robert H. McBride (1918–1983), United States Ambassador to Mexico

== Music ==
- Robert McBride (composer) (1911–2007), American composer
- Bob McBride (1946–1998), lead vocalist for the Canadian popular music group Lighthouse

== Others ==
- Robert McBride (poet) (died 1895), Irish-Canadian poet
- Robert McBride (police officer) (born 1963), police chief in South Africa; member of Umkhonto we Sizwe during the Apartheid era
- Robert M. McBride (1879–1970), American publisher based in New York

== See also ==
- Heber Robert McBride (1843–1925), Mormon pioneer
