= Ernest S. McBride Sr. High School =

High school in California, United States

Coordinates: 33.8308°N 118.0970°W

- California, United States

Information
- Type: High School
- Established: 2013
- Staff: 28.53 (FTE)
- Enrollment: 753 (2020-21)
- Color
- Mascot: Wolf

Ethnic composition as of 2020–21
Race and ethnicity	Total
Hispanic or Latino	50.9%
Non-Hispanic White/Anglo	23.4%
Asian	13.1%
African American	7.2%
Other	4.6%
Pacific Islander	0.5%
Native American	0.3%

Ernest S. McBride Sr. High School is a high school in the Long Beach Unified School District. It was built in 2013. The McBride mascot is the Wolves and its school colors are Blue and Silver. The school is named after civil rights activist Ernest McBride, Sr.
