= McBride Branch =

Stream in Owen County, Indiana, U.S.

Coordinates: 39°15′33″N 86°46′49″W

McBride Branch is a stream in Owen County, in the U.S. state of Indiana.

McBride Branch was named for a pioneer who settled near the creek.

== See also ==
- List of rivers of Indiana
