= Edward Lazarus =

American historian (born 1959)

Eddie Lazarus
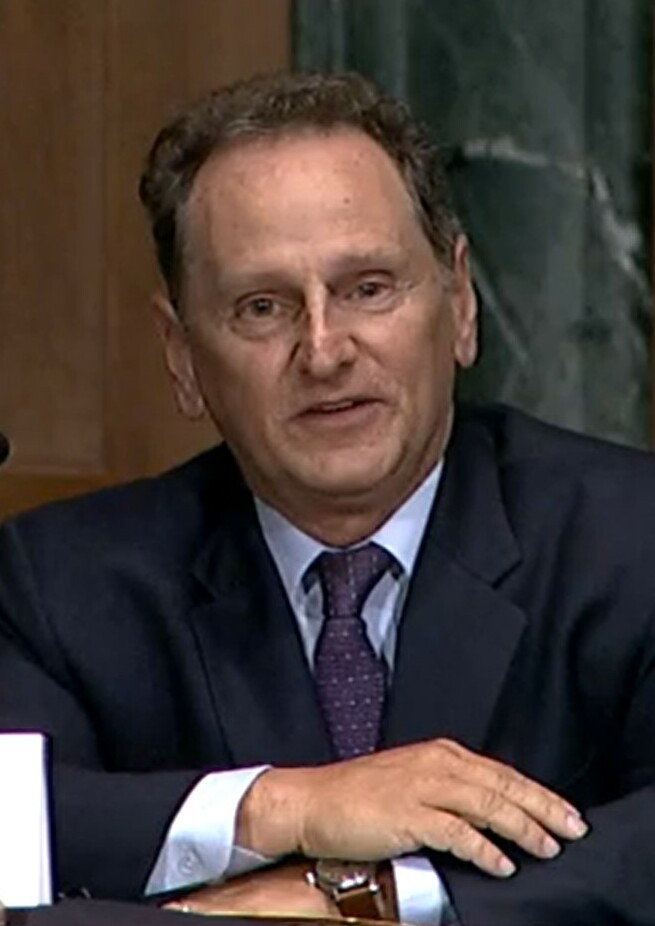
- Lazarus in 2021
- Born: September 9, 1959 (age 66); Washington, D.C., U.S.
- Education: Yale University (BA, JD)
- Occupation: Lawyer

Edward Lazarus (born September 9, 1959) is an American lawyer and writer. He currently serves as General Counsel for Sonos. From 2013 to 2018, Lazarus was general counsel and chief strategy officer for the Tribune Corporation, following its exit from bankruptcy. On January 16, 2017, he was named by President Barack Obama to serve on the United States Holocaust Memorial Council. He also served as Chief of Staff of the Federal Communications Commission from June 2008 to January 2012. He went to the FCC from the Los Angeles office of the law firm Akin Gump Strauss Hauer & Feld, where he was the head of litigation for the renowned firm.

== Early life and career ==
Lazarus graduated from Yale University in 1981 and Yale Law School in 1987. He was a law clerk for Justice Harry Blackmun from 1988 to 1989. From 2004 to April 2009, he wrote a regular column for FindLaw, and he appeared as a guest expert on legal affairs for several television and radio stations, including The Daily Show with Jon Stewart.

He is best known as the author of Closed Chambers, a controversial look at the inner workings of the Supreme Court. His first book, Black Hills, White Justice, was about the legal history of the Sioux Nation's land claims against the United States for compensation for the Black Hills — for which his father, Arthur Lazarus, Jr. was a principal attorney — culminating in the United States Supreme Court's ruling in United States v. Sioux Nation of Indians.

== See also ==
- List of law clerks for the second seat of the Supreme Court of the United States
