= Daniel McBride =

Daniel or Danny McBride may refer to:

- Danny McBride (born 1976), American actor, writer, and comedian
- Danny McBride (writer), American screenwriter and actor
- Danny McBride (musician) (1945–2009), American singer-songwriter and guitarist
- Daniel McBride, better known as Sheep, Dog & Wolf, New Zealand musician
