= Michael McBride =

Michael McBride may refer to:

- Michael McBride (doctor), Chief Medical Officer of Northern Ireland
- Michael McBride (fighter) (born 1983), American fighter
- Michael McBride (Gaelic footballer) (born 1982), Irish Gaelic footballer
- Michael McBride (soccer coach) (born 1975), Australian youth football coach
- Michael McBride, drummer for The Raspberries

== See also ==
- Michael McBryde (born 1981), Australian rower
