= MacBryde =

MacBryde is a surname of Irish origin. The name means "Son of [the servant of] Brigid". Brigid was the foundress of several monasteries of nuns. Notable people with the surname include:

- Jack MacBryde, American stage and radio actor
- Robert MacBryde (193–1966), British artist
- Olga Herrera-MacBryde, Ecuadorian-American botanist and international conservationist

== See also ==
- MacBride (disambiguation)
- McBryde (disambiguation)
- McBride (disambiguation)
