= James McBride =

James McBride may refer to:

- James McBride (actor) (born 1952), American actor
- James McBride (footballer) (1873–1899), early Liverpool F.C. player
- James McBride (pioneer) (1788–1859), American settler & amateur scientist
- James McBride (politician) (1802–1875), American politician and doctor in Oregon
- James McBride (writer) (born 1957), American writer & musician
- James H. McBride (1814–1864), Confederate general in the American Civil War
- Jim McBride (born 1941), American television and film director, film producer, and screenwriter
- Jim McBride (Wyoming politician) (born 1948), former Wyoming Superintendent of Public Instruction
- Jim McBride or Mr. Skin
- Jim McBride (songwriter) (1947–2026) American country music songwriter
