= Olga Herrera-MacBryde =

Ecuadorian-American botanist and international conservationist

Olga Herrera-MacBryde (1937–2007) was an Ecuadorian-American botanist and international conservationist.

== Early life ==
Olga Sabina Herrera Carvajal was born in 1937 in Guayaquil, Ecuador. She studied at the Colegio Normal Rita Lecumberry, following which she taught Spanish, Ecuadorian history and natural sciences in primary and high school. In 1963, she obtained a secondary school teaching certificate from the University of Guayaquil, and the following year, an undergraduate degree in botany. She then studied at the University of Houston and Saint Louis University, from which she received a master's degree in biology.

Herrera met her husband, Bruce MacBryde, in St. Louis.

== Career ==
Herrera-MacBryde worked at the Missouri Botanical Garden on taxonomy, before joining the Pontificia Universidad Católica del Ecuador at Quito, where she chaired the biology department between 1970–72. She co-founded a herbarium at the university, depositing nearly 1500 collections. From 1972–75, she moved to Canada, where she participated in the first comprehensive coverage of the wild plants of British Columbia. She also co-authored a book on Central American weeds.

In 1976, Herrera-MacBryde represented Ecuador at the first conference of the Convention on International Trade in Endangered Species of Wild Fauna and Flora. She worked at the Natural Resources Defense Council in Washington, DC, and the World Wildlife Fund's US arm.

She also worked at the education programme of the Charles Darwin Research Station in the Galapagos Islands.

Herrera-MacBryde joined the Smithsonian's botany department as an editor and scientific coordinator, specialising in the botany of the region from Mexico through South America. She was a co-author of the book Centres of Plant Diversity. She ran environmental training courses and monitored the Smithsonian's biodiversity programme between 1995–2004. She edited a book on the Beni Biosphere Reserve in Bolivia, and reported on the Mayan forests of Mexico and Central America.

== Later life ==
Herrera-MacBryde died in Fairfax, Virginia, from lung cancer, on April 22, 2007.

== Honors ==
Two plant species of Ecuador are named in her honour, as well as the Psychotria olgae, a tree species in the Chagres National Park in Panama.

== Selected publications ==
- Lewis, W.H.; Herrera-MacBryde, O. (1969). "Flora of Panama. Part VI. Family 96. Polygalaceae". Annals of the Missouri Botanical Garden. 56 (1): 9–28. doi:10.2307/2395163. JSTOR 2395163.
- Davis, S.D.; Heywood, V.H.; Herrera-MacBryde, O.; Villa-Lobos, J.; Hamilton, A.C., eds. (1997). Centres of Plant Diversity: A Guide and Strategy for Their Conservation, 3: The Americas. WWF and IUCN.
- Herrera-MacBryde, Olga; Dallmeier, Francisco; MacBryde, Bruce; Comiskey, James A.; Miranda, Carmen, eds. (2000). Biodiversity, conservation and management in the region of the Beni Biological Station Biosphere Reserve, Bolivia. Smithsonian Institution.
