= Otto von Bressensdorf =

American fraudster

Ottone Eugeno Camelio Bresselau, who claimed to be Otto von Bressensdorf, was a German-born fraudster in United States. The family name of the Austrian noble von Bressendorfs is Bresselau, Otto is a nickname for Ottone.

In the 1980s, Baron Otto von Bressendorf created an investment house that he named Lyons Capital. Lyons Capital attracted entrepreneurs who were looking for capital to start a business or expand their existing business. The company required a finder's fee of $10,000 - 30,000 and claimed a 70% success rate.

In fact, according to later FBI indictment, none of the customers received any financing. The company earned about $1 million a year. The Bressendorfs used the money to furnish their house. Some of the businesses went bankrupt and unsuccessfully sued Lyons Capital.

In 1993, the Bressendorfs moved to Richmond, Virginia and moved their business there. They also joined the local high society.

On January 21, 1998, the FBI indicted them for 209 counts of fraud, wire fraud and money laundering. At the time, even the citizenship of his wife was in doubt. In October of that same year, von Bressensdorf and his wife were sentenced to 11 years and 3 months in prison.
