= Tina Bride =

Flemish dance singer

- Born: Kim Poelmans; 23 December 1977 (age 48); Sint-Truiden, Belgium
- Occupation: singer

Tina Bride (birth name Kim Poelmans) is a Flemish dance singer. She was born in Sint-Truiden on 23 December 1977.

Bride trained and studied classical singing and jazz dance from the age of ten. She was discovered as a singer by the X-Session producer Marc Cortens in 2000, leading to the production of her first single, "Get To You", later that year.

== Discography ==
=== Singles ===
- "Get To You" (radio edit) / "Get To You" (DA Flip mix) (BE, 2000) (EAN: 7 86574 05245 3)
- "Get Another (Girlfriend)" (radio edit) / "Get Another (Girlfriend)" (extended mix) / "Get Another (Girlfriend)" (instrumental) (BE, 2001) (EAN: 7 86574 06245 2)
- "Don't Give Up" (radio mix) / "Don't Give Up" (extended mix) / "Don't Give Up" (instrumental) (BE, 2001) (EAN: 7 86574 05895 0)
- "Perfect love" (radio mix) / "Perfect Love" (extended mix) / "Perfect Love" (instrumental) (BE, 2001) (EAN: 7 86574 05565 2)
- "Party @" (radio edit) / "Party @" (extended mix) / "Party @" (instrumental) (BEL, 2002) (EAN: 7 86574 06575 0)
- "It Feels So Good" (radio edit) / Que Pour Nous Deux (radio edit) / It Feels So Good (extended mix) (BE, 2002) (EAN: 7 86574 07165 2)
- "Take a chance on me" (radio mix) / "Take A Chance On Me" (instrumental) (BE, 2003) (EAN: 7 86574 07535 3)
- "Mr.Sun" / "Love and Understanding" (BE, 2004) (EAN: 7 86574 084652)
- "Mr.Sun" / "Don't Give Up" / "What A Feeling" (GER, 2004) (EAN: 0 90204 92095 2)
- "Funky fever" (radio edit) / "Funky Fever" (instrumentaal) (BE, 2004) (EAN: 5 412705 000219)
- "Close To You" / "Bubbels in M’n Buik" (BE, 2007) (EAN: -)
- "Close To You" (radio edit) / "Close To You" (Dexter Connection Extended Mix) / "Close To You" (Dexxclab Club Remix) + VIDEOCLIP (100MB, MPG) (GER, 2008) (EAN: 0 90204 89411 6)

=== Compilations ===
- It Feels So Good – o.a. Kids klub (2003)
- Hij Komt – Sinterklaas Viert Feest (2003)
- Hoor Wie Klopt Daar – Sinterklaas Viert Feest (2003)
- Love And Understanding – Mr. Sun (2004)
- Mr. Sun – Mr. Sun (2004)

=== Albums ===
- The Bride Side of Life (in 2003)
