= Closed Chambers =

1998 book by Edward Lazarus

Closed Chambers: The Rise, Fall, and Future of the Modern Supreme Court
- Author: Edward Lazarus
- Publication date: 1998

Closed Chambers: The Rise, Fall, and Future of the Modern Supreme Court is a 1998 book by Edward Lazarus, who served as a law clerk for U.S. Supreme Court Justice Harry Blackmun during the October Term 1988. Lazarus combines his reflections as a clerk with a substantial body of research to describe the collapse in comity between Justices – and particularly clerks – at the Supreme Court. The book is noted both for its extraordinary inside access to internal Supreme Court deliberation and its arguably balanced account of the controversy surrounding many high-profile Supreme Court decisions on the death penalty, civil rights, and abortion.

== Summary ==
The subject matter is familiar, but Closed Chambers argues that the breakdown had less to do with Warren Court precedents or abortion (the latter being exceptionally divisive, but rarely on the court's docket), but rather a fundamental split over the death penalty. This split was later widened over disagreements concerning civil rights litigation. Lazarus presents the zealotry of the abolitionists at the Legal Defense Fund, compounded by the actions of Justices Marshall and Brennan, as a major and mounting frustration even for the moderate Justices of the court. This frustration eventually led even the center of the court – Justices White and Powell (and also Blackmun at least initially) – to align with leading conservative William Rehnquist in rejecting repeated habeas petitions supported by the LDF, a position that even the moderate justices had rejected. If true, this would mean that an organization that set out to abolish the death penalty actually succeeded in making it more capricious, less well-overseen and more commonly used.

Lazarus also argues that a tightly-organized network of conservative law clerks exercised substantial power over the Justices during his time as a law clerk.

== Criticism ==
In the January 1999 edition of the Yale Law Journal, Judge Alex Kozinski wrote a detailed criticism of the book as rife with factual errors, unreliable research methods, and strong biases in its analysis and tone.

Closed Chambers met with a wave of controversy over Lazarus's voluminous disclosure of the internal deliberations of the Supreme Court, which critics argued was confidential and protected by an oath taken by the law clerks. Similar controversy greeted the publication of Bob Woodward and Scott Armstrong's The Brethren, which relied on interviews with former clerks and Justices, two decades prior.

Lazarus's book was the first to reveal many formerly unknown facts about Supreme Court's decision-making, such as the fact that Justice Anthony Kennedy changed his vote during consideration of the 1992 landmark abortion case Planned Parenthood v. Casey.

== In popular culture ==
Larry David is seen reading Closed Chambers in "The Car Salesman", episode 1 of season 2 of Curb Your Enthusiasm.
