= Bride (disambiguation) =

A bride is a female participant in a wedding ceremony.

Bride(s) or The Bride may also refer to:

== Art ==
- The Bride, 1950 painting by Marc Chagall

== Geography ==
- Bride (parish), a parish on the Isle of Man
- Bride (river) a river in the south of Ireland

== People ==
- Brìde or Brigid, a goddess in Irish mythology
- Bride of Ireland or Brigit of Kildare, Christian saint
- Harold Bride (1890–1956), junior wireless operator on the RMS Titanic
- Jonah Bride (born 1995), American baseball player
- Tina Bride (born 1977), Flemish singer

== Plants and animals ==
- Exochorda ('The Bride'), a flowering shrub cultivar
- Bride moth (Catocala neogama)

== Books and magazines ==
- Brides (magazine), an American monthly magazine
- The Bride, a 1989 novel by Julie Garwood
- The Bride, a 1982 novel by Bapsi Sidhwa
- The Bride, a Marvel Comics series by Reginald Hudlin
- The Bride: the story of Louise and Montrose, a 1939 novel by Margaret Irwin

== Film and TV ==
- The Bride (1973 Turkish film), a Turkish drama film
- The Bride (1973 American film), a horror film starring Robin Strasser
- The Bride (1985 film), an adaptation of Mary Shelley's Frankenstein, starring Sting and Jennifer Beals
- Brides (2004 film) or Nyfes, a Greek film
- Brides (2014 film), a Georgian-French film directed by Tinatin Kajrishvili
- The Bride (2015 Spanish film), a Spanish film directed by Paula Ortiz
- The Bride (2015 Taiwanese film), a Taiwanese horror film directed by Lingo Hsieh
- The Bride (2017 film), a Russian film
- Bride (film), a 2018 Burmese horror film
- The Bride!, a 2026 horror film based on Bride of Frankenstein, starring Jessie Buckley
- Brides, an upcoming horror film

=== Fictional characters ===
- The Bride (Kill Bill), the protagonist of Quentin Tarantino's Kill Bill films

== Music ==
- Bride (band), a Christian rock band

=== Albums ===
- Brides (album), a 1987 album by Annabel Lamb
- The Bride (album), a 2016 album by Bat for Lashes

=== Songs ===
- "The Bride", a 1971 song by The Bintangs
- "The Bride" (song), a 2004 song by Trick Pony
- "The Bride", a song by Dirty Projectors from their 2009 album Bitte Orca
