= Mac Giolla =

Mac Giolla is a prefix-phrase used in some Irish surnames, meaning "son of the devotee of" (which is usually followed by the name of a prominent Christian saint). Examples of some notable individuals who bear this phrase in their surnames are:

- Tomás Mac Giolla (1924–2010), former TD
- Antoine Mac Giolla Bhrighde (1957–1984), Provisional Irish Republican Army (IRA) volunteer
- Brian Mac Giolla Phádraig (c. 1580–c. 1652), Irish scholar and poet
- Cathal Buí Mac Giolla Ghunna (c. 1680–1756), Irish poet
