= Andrew Bobbin =

Australian rugby league footballer

Personal information
- Full name: Andrew Bobbin
- Born: 8 November 1978 (age 47) Bega, New South Wales, Australia

Playing information
- Position: Prop
Club
Years	Team	Pld	T	G	FG	P
2001	St. George Illawarra	1	0	0	0	0

Andrew Bobbin (born 8 November 1978) is a former professional rugby league footballer who played for the St. George Illawarra Dragons. An Illawarra junior, his lone first grade appearance was in his side's 25–12 loss to the Sydney Roosters at the Sydney Football Stadium in round 25 of the 2001 NRL season. In the same year, he played for St. George Illawarra in their 2001 reserve grade grand final winning team. After retirement, Bobbin became a horse trainer.
