= Heber R. McBride =

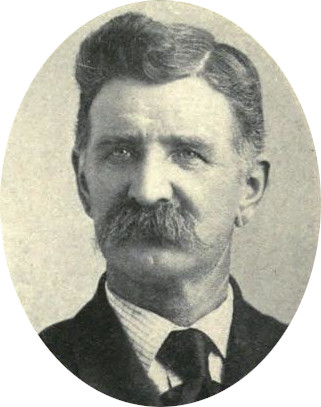
- Born: May 13, 1843; Ormskirk, England
- Died: July 29, 1925 (aged 82); Raymond, Alberta, Canada
- Known for: Mormon pioneer in the Martin Handcart Company
- Spouse(s): Elizabeth Ann Burns (July 28, 1868); Elizabeth B. Gould (November 24, 1884)

Heber Robert McBride (May 13, 1843 – July 29, 1925) was an autobiographer who immigrated to the United States from England in 1856 at the age of thirteen. He was a Mormon pioneer who migrated to Utah with the Martin Handcart Company. McBride was a member of the Church of Jesus Christ of Latter-day Saints.

== Early life ==
Heber Robert McBride was born to Margaret Howard and Robert McBride on May 13, 1843 in Lancashire, England. His father was from Scotland, and his mother was from Lancashire. He was one of their 5 children. McBride's family immigrated to the United States after McBride and his parents joined the Church of Jesus Christ of Latter-day Saints in 1856. He was only 13 when they traveled to the United States on the ship Horizon with approximately 950 other people. They landed in Boston, Massachusetts, and a few days later traveled westward to Chicago, Illinois and then Iowa City.

== Martin Handcart Company ==
McBride's family migrated west to Utah on November 30, 1856, leaving with the Martin Handcart Company led by Edward Martin. His handcart company had approximately 500 people when it began its westward trek. Both of his parents became ill on the trip, and his father died. Being the oldest son in the family, McBride helped pull the handcart with his older sister, Jennetta, making the journey to the Salt Lake Valley on foot. While on their journey, the group was faced with rationing and were caught in snowstorms. "Nearly all the children would cry themselves to sleep every night" wrote McBride. Ten wagons came from Salt Lake City to help the handcart company finish their journey. They did eventually arrive in Salt Lake, although in "a very pitiable condition." After his own experience crossing the plains, he helped others immigrate into Utah in 1865. He was called by Brigham Young to help immigrants who were stranded at Platte River in October 1866. His experience with the Martin Handcart Company was recorded in his personal journal which is now at the Brigham Young University's Harold B. Lee Library in their L. Tom Perry Special Collections.

== Life in Utah ==
McBride settled in Utah. In 1857 and 1858, he fought against Johnston's Army during the Utah War. He worked for some time hauling lumber to Plain City, Utah from the North Ogden Pass, and later took a job ferrying wood to Salt Lake. While on one of his boat trips, his boat got caught in a storm, and because he had not returned home, he was reported dead. He later bought a farm for $500. He spent the winter of 1862 in his home by the North Fork Fiver, but moved to Huntsville, Utah to attend school.

McBride recorded that in 1863 there were a number of Indians that were scattering livestock, and he was called to be a scout in the Black Hawk War in Utah Territory. He developed a friendship with a Native American named Tope even during the war. In 1868, McBride helped settle Ogden Valley, and the following year he helped construct the Union Pacific Railroad. McBride married Elizabeth Ann Burns on July 28, 1868. He later married Elizabeth B. Gould on November 24, 1884, and they had four children.

He moved to Raymond, Canada, near Lethbridge on June 5, 1904. He died in the summer of 1925. He is noted in the book Pioneers and Prominent Men of Utah and his autobiography is frequently cited by Mormon historians for its documentation of conditions in the Martin Handcart Company.
