= Ernest McBride Sr. =

Ernest S. McBride
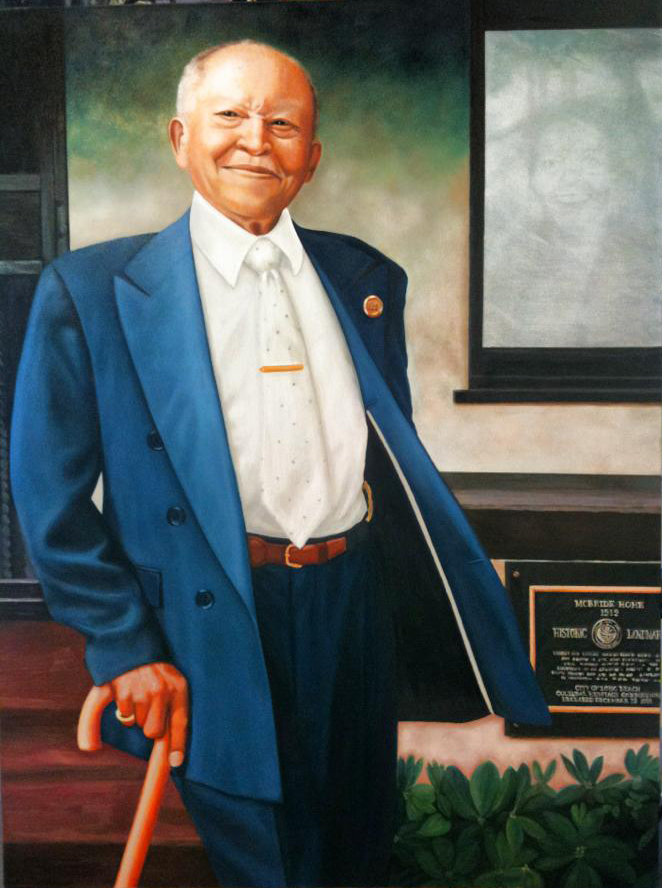
- Ernest S. McBride Sr.
- Born: November 12, 1909; North Carrollton, Mississippi
- Died: May 5, 2007 (aged 97); Long Beach, California
- Monuments: Ernest S. McBride Sr. High School; McBride Park; Long Beach Mural
- Known for: Civil rights and union activism
- Awards: Recogn. U.S. Congress, Rights Pioneer, Feb. 10, 1994 Spec. Recogn. U.S. Congress, NCCJ Award, May 18, 2000; Spec. Recogn. U.S. Congress, Humanitarian, May 18, 2000; Recogn. NAACP-Long Beach, Freedom Award, Oct. 15, 2004 Recogn. California State Assembly, Civil Rights, May 18, 2000

Ernest Samuel McBride Sr. (November 20, 1909 – May 5, 2007) was an African American civil rights activist and community leader based in Long Beach, California. He fought to improve the working prospects and conditions of African Americans in the shipyards, grocery stores, housing, police and fire departments in Long Beach. He was a co-founder of the Long Beach chapter of National Association for the Advancement of Colored People (NAACP). Like Martin Luther King Jr., McBride employed Mahatma Gandhi's model of peaceful protest to achieve civil rights gains. He became a target of the FBI's COINTELPRO, which targeted many of the country's civil rights organizations and leaders, including Martin Luther King Jr. - most famously resulting in the FBI - King Suicide Letter. McBride's legacy is memorialized in numerous awards, historic land marking of his home, and the naming of a high school and park.

== Early life and education ==
McBride was born on November 20, 1909, one of seven children of a Mississippi Delta farmer. There were no schools for black people in Mississippi so, at age 8, the family moved to Arkansas so that the children could attend school. In Little Rock, Arkansas, McBride and his siblings attended segregated schools. While still in school, he witnessed a white mob drag a black man to death behind an automobile, then set the man on fire. At the all-black Scipio A. Jones High School, McBride first learned about Mahatma Gandhi's model for peaceful protest of injustice. McBride graduated from Scipio A. Jones High School in 1930.

== Career ==
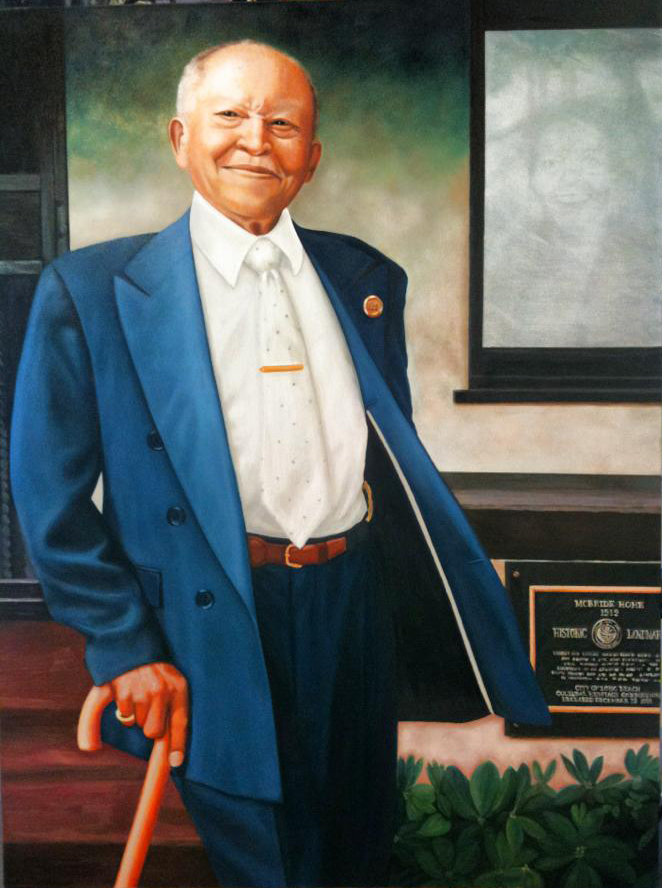
Painting of Ernest McBride Sr. by granddaughter Saam McBride-Adams, on display at Ernest McBride High School

McBride played briefly with the Memphis Red Sox in the Negro National League, but soon headed to California in search of better jobs and higher wages.

When he arrived in Long Beach in 1930, he found the city as segregated as Little Rock. His first job there was working on an all-black crew loading cotton onto ships in San Pedro Harbor. McBride discovered that his crew was making less than the previous workers—Latinos, who had been fired after asking for raise. McBride quit the job to fight to unionize shipyard workers, regardless of race. While working at a Ralph's grocery store in 1932, McBride became a union organizer for the Congress of Industrial Organizations (CIO). He organized the Ralph's employees, who picketed the store until it signed an agreement with the employees.

McBride served for five years on the CIO grievance committee and was authorized to represent any government employee west of the Mississippi River. He worked to get blacks hired in the City of Long Beach's Trash, Police, and Fire Departments.

In 1940, McBride and his wife Lillian decided to try and form a Long Beach branch of the National Association for the Advancement of Colored People (NAACP). They recruited Roscoe Hayes, L.J. Jones, and Nathan Holly and held the organizational meetings at the McBrides home, under the watchful eye of the police. With the assistance of the Reverend Willy Lomax of the Second Baptist Church, who made an appeal to his congregation, they were able to raise sufficient funds and membership to be accepted as an official chapter of the NAACP.

Among the many injustices he fought were attempts to bar him and his wife, also active in the movement, from purchasing a home on Lemon Avenue in Long Beach in 1948. When restrictive covenants and a petition by white neighbors to keep his family out might have stopped another man, McBride persevered, and not only bought the bungalow but raised his six children there. The house became a regular meeting place for civil rights activists. In the 1950s, McBride and his wife hosted receptions at their home for Eslande Goode Robeson, wife of Paul Robeson, while Mr. Robeson performed at a fundraising event for the Long Beach NAACP, and Margarita Belafonte, wife of Harry Belafonte—African-American luminaries and activists at the time. The McBride home was designated a historical landmark by the Long Beach City Council in 1994.

By then, McBride had become a local legend. Having co-founded the Long Beach Chapter of the NAACP, he successfully fought to integrate the Long Beach Police Department, the Long Beach Fire Dept., Ralph's grocery stores, the naval shipyard and General Telephone Co. He organized a student revolt (including two of his own children) to force local officials to abandon blackface minstrel shows.

From 1948 to 1972, the U.S. Federal Bureau of Investigation (FBI) maintained surveillance of McBride. The FBI was concerned that civil rights leaders had communist sympathies or ties, and conducted surveillance and covert activities against civil rights leaders and organizations as part of its COINTELPRO program.

== Death and legacy ==
Ernest McBride Sr. died in 2007 at the age of 97.

In addition to the historical landmark designation of his home, Long Beach's Ernest S. McBride Sr. High School, Ernest McBride Skate Park, and Ernest McBride community center are all named in his honor.

In 2008, his biography, Fighting for the People, was released, co-authored by Sunny Nash, author of Bigmama Didn't Shop At Woolworth's.
