= Jerry McBride =

American politician (born 1939)

Jerry E. McBride

Member of the Missouri House of Representatives from the 149th district
- In office 1974–2000

Personal details
- Born: May 20, 1939 (age 87) Licking, Missouri
- Party: Democratic

Jerry E. McBride (born May 20, 1939) is an American Democratic politician who served in the Missouri House of Representatives for 16 years.

== Biography ==
Born in Licking, Missouri, McBride graduated from Rolla High School. He served six years in the U.S. Army Reserves. In 1995, he helped pass a bill which enabled any Missouri city or county to pass up to a one-half cent sales tax for parks and/or storm water purposes. This legislation generated over a quarter billion dollars.
