= Gary McBride =

Australian rugby league footballer

Personal information
- Full name: Gary Alan McBride
- Born: 15 March 1980
- Died: 18 December 2009 (aged 29) Sydney

Playing information
- Position: Second-row
Club
| Years | Team | Pld | T | G | FG | P |
|---|---|---|---|---|---|---|
| 2002 | St George Illawarra Dragons | 2 | 0 | 0 | 0 | 0 |

Gary McBride (15 March 1980 – 18 December 2009) was a professional rugby league footballer who played for the St. George Illawarra Dragons. A former Fragons junior from Hurstville United and an Under 17 rep player, Gary McBride featured in one first grade season in 2002.

He died on 18 December 2009.
