= McBryde =

McBryde is a surname. Notable people with the surname include:

- Archibald McBryde (1766–1836), American politician
- Ashley McBryde (born 1983), American Country music singer and songwriter
- Dashawn Spears (McBryde), (born 2006), American football player
- Ian McBryde (born 1953), Australian poet
- Ian McBryde (South Australian politician) (1928–2005), councillor on Walkerville Council
- Ian McBryde, independent candidate in the 2026 South Australian state election
- James E. McBryde (1950–2024), American politician
- John H. McBryde (1931–2022), American jurist
- John McLaren McBryde (1841–1923), American educator
- Robin McBryde (born 1970), Welsh rugby coach and player
- Ron McBryde (born 1939), Canadian politician

== See also ==
- McBryde Garden, a botanical garden in Kauai, Hawaii, United States
- McBride (disambiguation)
- MacBryde
- MacBride (disambiguation)
