= Andy McBride =

English footballer

Personal information
- Full name: Andrew David McBride
- Date of birth: 15 March 1954 (age 72)
- Place of birth: Nakuru, Kenya Colony
- Height: 6 ft 2 in (1.88 m)
- Position: Central defender

Youth career
- Crystal Palace

Senior career*
Years	Team	Apps	(Gls)
1973–1974	Crystal Palace	1	(0)
- Cape Town City
- Hellenic
- Jewish Guild
- Highlands Park
1978–1980	California Surf	62	(2)
1980–1981	California Surf (indoor)	18	(6)
1981–1982	Pittsburgh Spirit (indoor)	30	(1)
Total		111	(9)
- * Club domestic league appearances and goals

Andrew David McBride (born 15 March 1954) is an English retired professional footballer who played in England and the United States as a central defender.

== Career ==
Born in Nakuru, Kenya Colony, McBride began his career as an apprentice at Crystal Palace, making one league appearance during the 1973–74 season. He later played in the South Africa and the United States for Cape Town City, Hellenic, Jewish Guild, Highlands Park, California Surf and Pittsburgh Spirit.
