= Peter McBride (physician) =

Scottish physician (1854–1946)

Peter McBride FRSE (1854–1946) was a Scottish physician and expert on the larynx. In 1897 he was first to identify the malignant granuloma of the nose known as Granuloma Syndrome or granulomatosis with polyangiitis. Edinburgh's McBride Lecture was named in his honour in 1979.

He opened the first Otorhinolaryngology (ORL) Department in Scotland at the Edinburgh Royal Infirmary. This is commonly known as an Ear, Nose and Throat (ENT) Department.

== Life ==
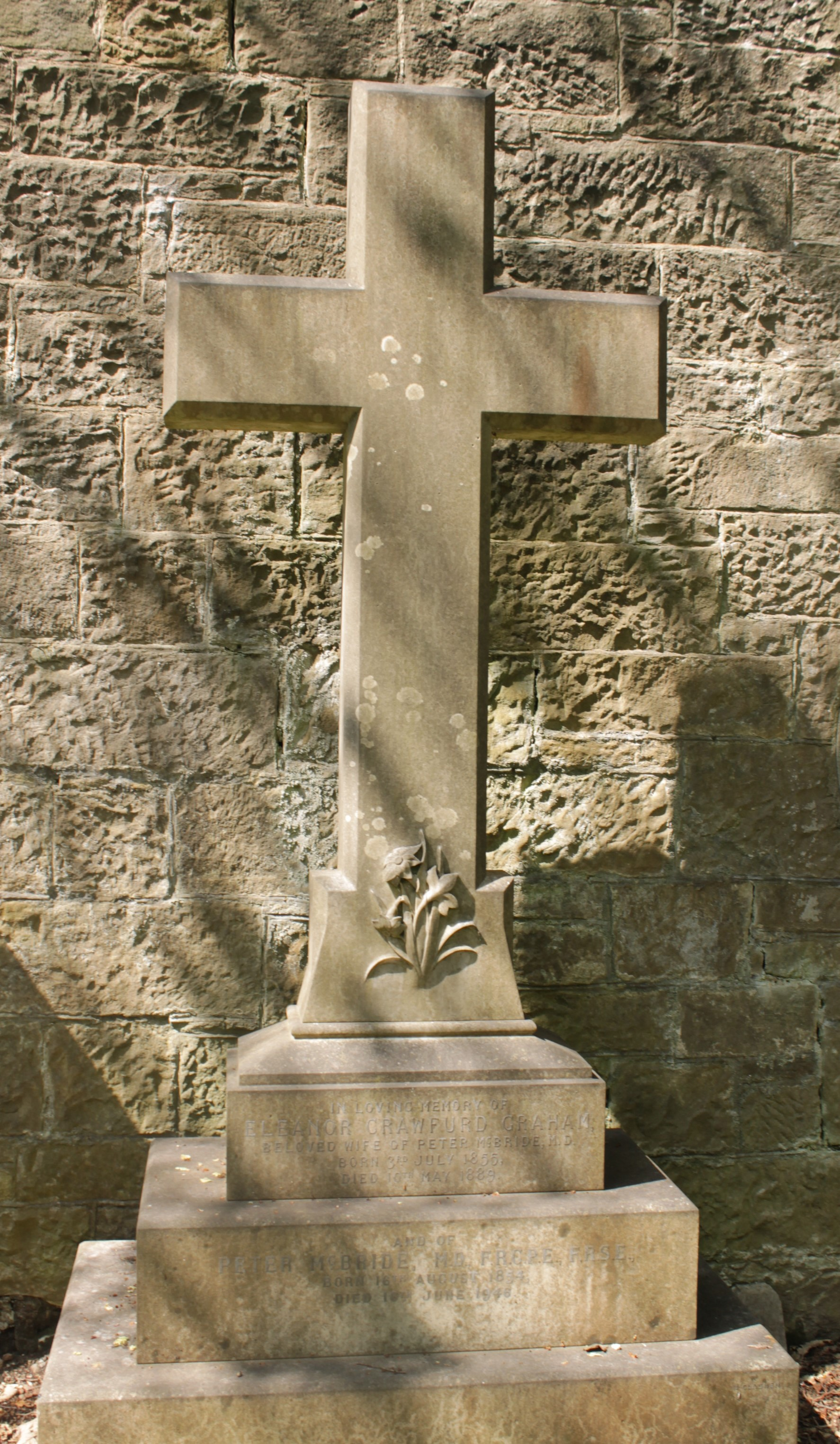
The grave of Peter McBride, Dean Cemetery

He was born in Hamburg in Germany on 16 August 1854 of Scottish parents. He studied medicine at the University of Edinburgh graduating with an MB ChB in 1876, and did further postgraduate studies in Vienna. He began lecturing in diseases of the ear, nose and throat on his return to Edinburgh.

In 1883 he was elected a Fellow of the Royal Society of Edinburgh. His proposers were Alexander Crum Brown, George Chrystal, Peter Guthrie Tait and John Young Buchanan. At this time he lived at 16 Chester Street in Edinburgh's West End.

In 1886 the actor Henry Irving appears to have been amongst his patients.

In 1913 he gave the first Semon Lecture, giving an account of Semon's life and work.

He died in Edinburgh on 16 June 1946 aged 92. He is buried in Dean Cemetery. The grave lies on the hidden southern terrace close to the grave of Alexander Crum Brown.

== Family ==
He was married to Eleanor Crawfurd Graham (1855–1889).

== Publications ==
- Diseases of the Larynx 1885 (co-written with Dr Jacob Gottstein)
- Diseases of the Throat, Nose & Ear 1892
