= Murri Rugby League Carnival =

Annual rugby league carnival in Queensland, Australia

Qld Murri Carnival
- Sport: Rugby league
- Inaugural season: 22–25 September 2011
- Winners: Dhadhin Geai Warriors (2017)
- Most titles: Southern Dingoes (3 titles)
- Website: http://www.arthurbeetsonfoundation.com.au/the-murri-carnival
- Broadcast partner: NITV; SBS
- Related competition: NSW Koori Knockout; All Stars match

The Qld Murri Carnival (QAIHC Arthur Beetson Foundation Murri Rugby League Carnival) is an annual four-day rugby league carnival for Aboriginal and Torres Strait Islanders Queensland rugby league teams. Queensland Rugby League (QRL) has awarded the Arthur Beetson Foundation with the tender for the next few years to host the Qld State Championships as part of the Carnival. The Foundation has employed MRL Qld Pty Ltd to event manage the Murri Rugby League carnival.

== About ==
The carnival has certain basic rules. An adult person cannot play in the carnival unless they:

- undergo a health check; and
- enrol to vote or, if enrolled, make sure that their enrolment details are current.

An under 15 player cannot play in the carnival unless they:

- undergo a health check; and
- have a 90% school attendance record from 1 July to the date of the Carnival.

The Queensland Aboriginal & Islander Health Council have established a partnership with the Arthur Beetson Foundation, to support the organisation and running of the Qld Murri Carnival so that it is as an alcohol, smoke, drug and sugar-free event to help better health outcomes for the community.

== Murri Carnival Winners ==
Year	Mens Murri Carnival Winners
Year	Team
2011	Southern Dingoes
2012	Argun Warriors
2013	Southern Dingoes
2014	Badu Kulpiyam
2015	Southern Dingoes
2016	Cherboug Hornets
2017	Dhadhin Geai Warriors

=== QLD Murri vs. NSW Koori Interstate Challenge ===
The QLD Murri vs. NSW Koori Interstate Challenge is an annual rugby league game played between the winners of the NSW Koori Knockout and Murri Rugby League Carnival. It is played each year (except in a World Cup year) in Queensland as part of the Indigenous All Stars event and is delivered by the Arthur Beetson Foundation like the Qld Murri Carnival as an alcohol, smoke, drug and sugar-free event to help better health outcomes for the community.

Year	Murri vs. Koori Interstate Challenge
Year	Winners	Score	Runners-up
2012	Mindaribba Warriors	40–18	Southern Dingoes
2013	Argun Warriors	28–24	Newcastle Yowies
2014	Newcastle Yowies	18–12	Southern Dingoes
2015	Badu Kulpiyam	30–22	Walgett Aboriginal Connection
2016	Southern Dingoes	26–12	Redfern All Blacks
2017	Redfern All Blacks	34–12	Cherbourg Hornets
2018	Newcastle Yowies	38–26	Dhadhin Geai Warriors

== Representative Sides ==
=== Festival of Indigenous Rugby League ===
The NRL launched a Festival of Indigenous Rugby League program to take the place of the prestigious pre-season Rugby League All Stars game following every World Cup year. The 2014 Festival of Indigenous Rugby League featured a trial match between the Newcastle Knights and an Indigenous team, drawn from the NSW Koori Rugby League Knockout and Murri Carnivals in Queensland, as well as the NRL Indigenous Player Cultural Camp, Murri vs Koori women's and Under 16s representative games, a Murri v Koori match, a jobs expo and community visits.

First Nation Goannas
2014 squad		Coaching staff
1 Javarn White – FB; 2 Kieran Vale – WG; 3 Rickki Sutherland – CE; 4 Joshua Benjamin – CE; 5 Malcolm Congoo – WG; 6 Kareel Phillips – FE; 7 Adrian Davis (c) – HB; 8 Reggie Saunders – PR; 9 Roy Smith – HK; 10 Matthew Pittman – PR; 11 Noel Underwood – SR; 12 Davin Crampton – SR; 13 Phil Dennis – LK	14 David Peachey – FB; 15 Nathan Blacklock – FB; 16 James Livock – PR; 17 Rod Jensen – CE, SR; 18 Bobby Nona – PR, SR; 19 Rex Johnson; 20 Denis Moran – HB	Head coach: Laurie Daley; Legend: (c) Captain(s); (vc) Vice-captain(s)

8 February 2014, 7pm (AEDT)

Newcastle Knights	52–12	First Nation Goannas
Tries; Jake Mamo 3 Joseph Tapine 2 Alex McKinnon 1 Korbin Sims 1 Sione Mata'utia 1 Josh Mantellato 1 Matt Minto 1 Goals; Josh Mantellato 6/10		Tries; 1 Davin Crampton; 1 Rod Jensen; Goals; 2/2 Adrian Davis

Hunter Stadium
Attendance: 6,826
Referee: Gavin Badger, Chris James, Jeff Younis, Dave Ryan

=== 2018 Festival of Indigenous Rugby League ===
The 2018 Festival of Indigenous Rugby League was held at on February 10, 2018. The event replaced the annual NRL All Stars match for that year and was organized to highlight Indigenous and Māori heritage through sport.

The festival featured a triple-header of matches, preceded by cultural ceremonies including a Welcome to Country and traditional war cries from the participating teams.

First Nation Goannas
2018 squad		Coaching staff
1 Ryan Walker – FB; 2 Michael Purcell – WG; 3 Kieran Vale – CE; 4 Josh Charles – CE; 5 Greg Davis – WG; 6 Maipele Morseu – FE; 7 Adrian Davis – HB; 8 Dan Tanner – PR; 9 Wes Middleton (c) – HK; 10 Zac Merritt – PR; 11 Noel Underwood – SR; 12 Justin Toomey-White – SR; 13 Trent Rose – LK	14 Randall Briggs; 15 Bennett Leslie – LK, SR; 16 Will Merritt – PR; 17 Isaac Briggs; 18 Tristan Lumley – SR, LK; 19 Wes Conlon – FB; 20 Shane Nolan-Carr – HK	Head coach: Laurie Daley; Legend: (c) Captain(s); (vc) Vice-captain(s)

10 February 2018

First Nation Goannas	22–16	New Zealand Maori
Tries; Ryan Walker 1 Michael Purcell 1 Dan Tanner 1 Kieran Vale 1 Goals; 3/4 Adrian Davis		Tries; 1 Ozzy Tuwhangai; 1 Carne Doyle-Manga; 1 Jayden Horo; Goals; 2/3 Manaia Rudolph

Redfern Oval

First Nation Gems
2018 squad		Coaching staff
1 Kazzia Lemmon – FB; 2 Tanika Marshall – WG; 3 Amber Piley – CE; 4 Taleenna Simon – CE; 5 Paris Robinson – WG; 6 Sarah Field – FE; 7 Sharon McGrady – HB; 8 Rhianna Sutherland – PR; 9 Kiara Maza – HK; 10 Layla Fauid – PR; 11 Samartha Leisha (c) – SR; 12 Stephanie Mooka – SR; 13 Carly Phillips – LK	14 Ashleigh Sowter; 15 Shakia Tungai; 16 Rikki Lane; 17 Kyara Nean; 18 Candice Clay; 19 Chloe Caldwell	Head coach: Dean Widders; Legend: (c) Captain(s); (vc) Vice-captain(s)

10 February 2018

First Nation Gems	18–0	New Zealand Maori Ferns
Tries; Samartha Leisha 1 Taleena Simon 2 Goals; Sarah field 3/3

Redfern Oval

=== 2014 Representative squad ===
Queensland Murri
2014 Representative Squad		Coaching staff
1 Menmuny Murgha – FB; 2 Marlon Doak – WG; 3 Bradley Stephens – CE; 4 Brendon Marshall – CE; 5 Ronald Conlon – WG; 6 Sean Yorston – FE; 7 Steven Singleton – HB; 8 Bill McConnachie – PR; 9 Rex Johnson – HK; 10 Matt Bon – PR; 11 Tristian Lumley – SR; 12 Joel Marama – SR; 13 Noel Underwood – LK	14 Brandon Cubby; 15 Marmin Barba – WG, FB; 16 Philip Vinson; 17 George Jarrett – PR, SR; 18 Nathan Gaulton; 19 Morris Hodges; 20 Kepa Sabesio	Legend: (c) Captain(s); (vc) Vice-captain(s)

== Indigenous NRL players to play in Murri Carnival ==
- Ben Barba
- Nathan Blacklock
- Dane Gagai
- Yileen Gordon
- Rod Jensen
- Brenko Lee
- Edrick Lee
- Robert Lui
- David Peachey
- Steve Renouf
- Chris Sandow
- Sam Thaiday
- Travis Waddell
- Kierran Moseley

== See also ==
- Murri Rugby League Team
- Indigenous Australians
- Murri people
- Torres Strait Islanders
- NSW Koori Knockout
