= NSW Koori Knockout =

Indigenous Australian rugby league competition

- Sport: Rugby league
- Inaugural season: 1971
- Winners & Host: Newcastle Yowies (2025)
- Most titles: Redfern All-Blacks (8 titles)
- Broadcast partner: NITV, SBS
- Related competition: Murri Rugby League Carnival; All Stars match

The NSW Koori Rugby League Knockout carnival is one of the biggest Indigenous gatherings in Australia. The winning team gains the right to host the next knockout. Organisers created the knockout to provide further access for Indigenous players to state rugby league.

The carnival is a significant annual event in Indigenous Australian culture and sport. It is a rugby league competition that brings together Aboriginal and Torres Strait Islander teams from various communities across New South Wales. The event typically takes place over the October long weekend. The Koori Knockout not only showcases talented rugby league players but also serves as a gathering for Indigenous communities to celebrate culture, heritage, and community pride. It is a highly anticipated event, with teams competing for the title, and communities coming together to support their local teams.

The first knockout was held at Camdenville Park, St Peters, on the October long weekend of 1971 with seven participating teams. The knockout celebrated its 50th anniversary in 2022.

== History ==
=== Concept ===
The Knockout emerged from the new and growing mostly inner-city Sydney Aboriginal community in the late 1960s and early 1970s. The emerging political movement in Redfern for self-determination and justice, increased opportunities arising from post-referendum federal government initiatives and greater employment prospects in the industrial areas of Sydney influenced Aboriginal families' migration to the inner-city, particularly South Sydney. The Knockout emerged within this complex economic and social context. It was initiated by six men, and one woman, affiliated with Koorie United: Bob Smith, Bob Morgan, Bill Kennedy, Danny Rose, Victor Wright, the late George Jackson, and Barbara Flick. They formed Koorie United in response to the rapidly expanding Sydney Aboriginal community. The established Sydney-based Aboriginal sides, the Redfern All Blacks and La Perouse Panthers (or Blacks as they were sometimes called), were aligned with the South Sydney football district. There were many Aboriginal men looking for a game of football and so Koorie United formed joining the rival Newtown Jets district, with sponsorship from Marrickville Council, where some of the committee members worked.

The Koorie United committee were connected through kinship and the shared experience of relocating to the city. Bob Morgan, Danny Rose and Bill Kennedy hail from the New South Wales north-western town of Walgett in Gamilaroi country. Bob Smith and Victor Wright had relocated from Kemspey on the New South Wales north coast, and while the late George Jackson was based in Sydney, he also had connections with Gamilaroi as his wife was from Coonabarabran. Barbara Flick hails from Collarenebri.

After a meeting at the Clifton Hotel, a popular venue for the Koori community in Redfern during the 1960s and 70s, the Koorie United committee suggested organizing a statewide Knockout competition. Before this initiative, there were numerous town-based knockout events for football and basketball. However, the creation of this Knockout aimed to achieve distinct goals. According to Bob Morgan:

Our concept at the time was to also have a game where people who had difficulty breaking into the big time would be on show. They could put their skills on show and the talent scouts would come and check them out.

The Knockout was formed with a view to providing a stage for the many talented Aboriginal footballers playing at the time who had been overlooked by the talent scouts. Although there were some notable exceptions, like Bruce (La Pa) Stewart playing on the wing for Easts and field goal specialist, Eric Simms, with South Sydney, Aboriginal footballers experienced difficulty breaking into the big time. It was thought the Knockout would provide a chance for Aboriginal footballers to get noticed, where for reasons of racism and lack of country-based recruitment they were overlooked. There was also some talk of entering an all-Aboriginal side in the National Rugby League competition. But the instigation of the Knockout was intended to be far more than sporting competition, as original committee member Bob Morgan said:

The Knockout was never simply about football, it was about family, it was about community, it was getting people to come together and enjoy and celebrate things rather than win the competition football.

=== The first knockout ===
In 1971 Koorie United hosted the first knockout at Camdenville Park, St Peters, which attracted seven teams: Koorie United, Redfern All Blacks, Kempsey, La Perouse, Walgett, Moree and a combined Mt Druitt / South Coast side. It was won by La Perouse United. The Koori Knockout was played at Camdenville Oval for a couple of years.

=== Venues ===
Koori United won the Knockout in 1974, and it was decided that the Koori Knockout would be held in Kempsey the following year. The Kempsey Knockout was a memorial to the late Victor Wright Senior, a long-time supporter of the Knockout and of Aboriginal Football. From there, the tradition of the winning team hosting the Knockout commenced.

The original winning trophy was donated by the Foundation for Aboriginal Affairs.

The inscription on the trophy reads, NSW Koorie Sports Committee Annual Football Knockout Perpetual Trophy, donated by the Foundation of Aboriginal Affairs.

BAC Walgett became the first team to win the Knockout on three consecutive occasions. Their first win in 1988 (at Newcastle) resulted in some controversy regarding the tradition of the winner hosting the carnival, questioning the capacity of a small remote country township (population around 2200) to stage such a major event. With upwards of 6000 footballers, 50-odd teams and officials, supporters and family coming to town in 1989 for the three-day carnival, the Walgett community carried the day and went on to win it at Walgett in 1989 and again in 1990. The BAC management team chose to stage the carnival in Sydney in 1991 for its 21st anniversary.

== Knockout winners ==
Year	Men's Knockout Winners	Women's Knockout Winners	Under 17 Boys Knockout Winners	Under 17 Girls Knockout Winners
Year	Team	Team	Team	Team
1971	La Perouse United
1972	Redfern All Blacks
1973	Redfern All Blacks
1974	Koorie United
1975	Kempsey All Blacks
1976	Louis St Dodgers
1977	West Kempsey
1978	Redfern All Blacks
1979	Redfern All Blacks
1980	Narwan Eels
1981	Zetland Magpies
1982	Zetland Magpies
1983	Dubbo Pacemakers
1984	Koorie United
1985	Moree Boomerangs
1986	Narwan Eels
1987	Newcastle All Blacks
1988	BAC Walgett
1989	BAC Walgett
1990	BAC Walgett
1991	La Perouse All Blacks
1992	Redfern All Blacks
1993	Redfern All Blacks
1994	Toomelah Tigers
1995	Bourke Weilmoringle
1996	Nambucca Valley Rams
1997	Nambucca Valley Rams
1998	Wellington Wedgetails
1999	Nambucca Valley Rams
2000	Narwan Eels / Louis St Dodgers
2001	Narwan Eels / La Perouse Panthers
2002	Moree Boomerangs / La Perouse Panthers
2003	Cec Patten-Ron Merritt Memorial
2004	Cec Patten-Ron Merritt Memorial
2005	Cec Patten-Ron Merritt Memorial
2006	Cec Patten-Ron Merritt Memorial
2007	Wollumbin Warriors/Newcastle All Blacks	Casino
2008	Narwan Eels	Casino	Nulla Dolphins
2009	BAC Walgett
2010	Walgett Aboriginal Connection
2011	Mindaribba Warriors
2012	Newcastle Yowies	Mindaribba Sisters
2013	Newcastle Yowies	Newcastle Yowies	La Perouse
2014	Walgett Aboriginal Connection	Redfern All Blacks	Newcastle All Stars
2015	Redfern All Blacks	Redfern All Blacks	Toomelah Tigers
2016	Redfern All Blacks	Redfern All Blacks	La Perouse
2017	Newcastle Yowies	Redfern All Blacks	Illawarra Titans
2018	Newcastle All Blacks	Newcastle Yowies	Western Koori Eels
2019	South Coast Black Cockatoos	Wellington Wedgetails	Kempsey Sharks	La Perouse
2020	Cancelled due to COVID-19 pandemic in Australia
2021	Cancelled due to COVID-19 pandemic in Australia
2022	Newcastle All Blacks	Dunghutti Connexions	Blacktown Red Belly Warriors	Cabbage Tree Island
2023	Walgett Aboriginal Connection	Wiradjuri Aboriginal Rivers	La Perouse Panthers	Northern United Dirawongs
2024	Walgett Aboriginal Connection	Redfern All Blacks	La Perouse Panthers	Waterloo Storm
2025	Newcastle Yowies	Newcastle Yowies	Narwan Eels	Newcastle Yowies
2026	Wiradjuri Aboriginal Rivers	Newcastle Yowies	Narwan Eels	Dunghutti RLFC

== Koori vs. Murri Interstate Challenge ==
Extended content

The QLD Murri vs. NSW Koori Interstate Challenge is an annual rugby league game played between the Open Men's winners of the NSW Koori Knockout and Murri Rugby League Carnival.

Year	Koori vs. Murri Interstate Challenge
Year	Winners	Score	Runners-up
2012	Mindaribba Warriors	40–18	Southern Dingoes
2013	Argun Warriors	28–24	Newcastle Yowies
2014	Newcastle Yowies	18–12	Southern Dingoes
2015	Badu Kulpiyam	30–22	Walgett Aboriginal Connection
2016	The Southern Dingoes	26–12	Redfern All Blacks
2017	Redfern All Blacks	34–12	Cherbourg Hornets
2018	Newcastle Yowies	38–26	Dhadhin Geai Warriors

== Festival of Indigenous Rugby League ==
Extended content

=== 2014 Festival of Indigenous Rugby League ===
The NRL launched a Festival of Indigenous Rugby League program to take the place of the prestigious pre-season Rugby League All Stars game following every World Cup year. The 2014 Festival of Indigenous Rugby League featured a trial match between the Newcastle Knights and an Indigenous team, drawn from the NSW Koori Rugby League Knockout and Murri Rugby League Carnival in Queensland, as well as the NRL Indigenous Player Cultural Camp, Murri vs Koori women's and Under 16s representative games, a Murri v Koori match, a jobs expo and community visits.

First Nation Goannas
2014 squad		Coaching staff
1 Javarn White – FB; 2 Kieran Vale – WG; 3 Rickki Sutherland – CE; 4 Joshua Benjamin – CE; 5 Malcolm Congoo – WG; 6 Kareel Phillips – FE; 7 Adrian Davis (c) – HB; 8 Reggie Saunders – PR; 9 Roy Smith – HK; 10 Matthew Pittman – PR; 11 Noel Underwood – SR; 12 Davin Crampton – SR; 13 Phil Dennis – LK	14 David Peachey – FB; 15 Nathan Blacklock – FB; 16 James Livock – PR; 17 Rod Jensen – CE, SR; 18 Bobby Nona – PR, SR; 19 Rex Johnson; 20 Denis Moran – HB	Head coach: Laurie Daley; Legend: (c) Captain(s); (vc) Vice-captain(s)

8 February 2014, 7pm (AEDT)

Newcastle Knights	52–12	First Nation Goannas
Tries; Jake Mamo 3 Joseph Tapine 2 Alex McKinnon 1 Korbin Sims 1 Sione Mata'utia 1 Josh Mantellato 1 Matt Minto 1 Goals; Josh Mantellato 6/10		Tries; 1 Davin Crampton; 1 Rod Jensen; Goals; 2/2 Adrian Davis

Hunter Stadium
Attendance: 6,826
Referee: Gavin Badger, Chris James, Jeff Younis, Dave Ryan

=== 2018 Festival of Indigenous Rugby League ===
2018 Festival of Indigenous Rugby League created a strong connection between the Maori, Aboriginal and Torres Strait Islanders. The First Nations Goannas are chosen from the Koori Knockout and the Murri Carnival. With a strong showcase of cultural celebration from both teams. The 2018 Festival of Indigenous Rugby League was held at Redfern Oval featuring a Double header between the First Nation Goannas v NZ Maori and First Nation Gems v NZ Maori Ferns, And a curtain raiser game for the Koori vs Murri Interstate challenge Between Newcastle Yowies and Dhadin Geai Warriors .

First Nation Goannas
2018 squad		Coaching staff
1 Ryan Walker – FB; 2 Michael Purcell – WG; 3 Kieran Vale – CE; 4 Josh Charles – CE; 5 Greg Davis – WG; 6 Maipele Morseu – FE; 7 Adrian Davis – HB; 8 Dan Tanner – PR; 9 Wes Middleton (c) – HK; 10 Zac Merritt – PR; 11 Noel Underwood – SR; 12 Justin Toomey-White – SR; 13 Trent Rose – LK	14 Randall Briggs – FE; 15 Bennett Leslie – LK, SR; 16 Will Merritt – PR; 17 Isaac Briggs – PR; 18 Tristan Lumley – SR, LK; 19 Wes Conlon – FB, HK; 20 Shane Nolan-Carr – HB, HK	Head coach: Laurie Daley; Assistant coach: Dean Widders; Legend: (c) Captain(s); (vc) Vice-captain(s); Updated: 10 February 2018; Source(s): Festival of Indigenous Rugby League Squads

10 February 2018

First Nation Goannas	22–16	New Zealand Maori
Tries; Ryan Walker 1 Michael Purcell 1 Dan Tanner 1 Kieran Vale 1 Goals; Adrian Davis 3/4		Tries; 1 Ozzy Tuwhangai; 1 Carne Doyle-Manga; 1 Jayden Horo; Goals; Manaia Rudolph 2/3

Redfern Oval

First Nation Gems
2018 squad		Coaching staff
1 Kazzia Lemmon – FB; 2 Tanika Marshall – WG; 3 Amber Piley – CE; 4 Taleenna Simon – CE; 5 Paris Robinson – WG; 6 Sarah Field – FE; 7 Sharon McGrady – HB; 8 Rhianna Sutherland – PR; 9 Kiara Maza – HK; 10 Layla Fauid – PR; 11 Samartha Leisha (c) – SR; 12 Stephanie Mooka – SR; 13 Carly Phillips – LK	14 Ashleigh Sowter; 15 Shakia Tungai; 16 Rikki Lane; 17 Kyara Nean; 18 Candice Clay; 19 Chloe Caldwell	Head coach: Dean Widders; Legend: (c) Captain(s); (vc) Vice-captain(s); Updated: 10 February 2018; Source(s): Festival of Indigenous Rugby League Squads

10 February 2018

First Nation Gems	18–0	New Zealand Maori Ferns
Tries; Samartha Leisha 1 Taleena Simon 2 Goals; Sarah field 3/3

Redfern Oval

== Championships By Team ==
=== Open Men's ===
Teams	Wins	Years
Redfern All Blacks	8	1972, 1973, 1978, 1979, 1992, 1993, 2015, 2016
BAC / WAC Walgett	8	1988, 1989, 1990, 2009, 2010, 2014, 2023, 2024
Narwan Eels	5	1980, 1986, 2000, 2001, 2008
Cec Patten-Ron Merritt Memorial	4	2003, 2004, 2005, 2006
Newcastle Yowies	4	2012, 2013, 2017, 2025
La Perouse Panthers	3	1971, 2001, 2002
Nambucca Valley Rams	3	1996, 1997, 1999
Zetland Magpies	2	1981, 1982
Koorie United	2	1974, 1984
Louis St Dodgers	2	1976, 2000
Moree Boomerangs	2	1985, 2002
Newcastle All Blacks	3	2007, 2018, 2022
Dubbo Pacemakers	1	1983
Toomelah Tigers	1	1994
Wellington Wedgetails	1	1998
Bourke Weilmoringle	1	1995
Kempsey All Blacks	1	1975
West Kempsey	1	1977
Mindaribba Warriors	1	2011
Wollumbin Warriors	1	2007
La Perouse All Blacks	1	1991
South Coast Black Cockatoos	1	2019
Wiradjuri Aboriginal Rivers	1	2026

=== Open Women's ===
Teams	Wins	Years
Redfern All Blacks	5	2014, 2015, 2016, 2017, 2024
Newcastle Yowies	5	2013, 2018, 2023, 2025, 2026
Casino	2	2007, 2008
Dunghutti Connexions	1	2022
Mindaribba Sisters	1	2012
Wellington Wedgetails	1	2019

=== Under 17 Boys ===
Teams	Wins	Years
La Perouse	4	2013, 2016, 2023, 2024
Narwan Eels	2	2025, 2026
Newcastle All Stars	1	2014
Illawarra Titans	1	2017
Toomelah Tigers	1	2015
Western Koori Eels	1	2018
Kempsey Sharks	1	2019

=== Under 16/17 Girls ===
Tournament changed to Under 17's in 2022 to match boys competition.

Teams	Wins	Years
La Perouse	1	2019
Cabbage Tree Island	1	2022
Northern Island Dirawongs	1	2023
Waterloo Storm	1	2024
Newcastle Yowies	1	2025
Dunghutti RLFC	1	2026

== Trophies ==
Throughout the history of the Knockout there have been many trophies added. Many of the trophies are memorials. Some of these trophies are dedicated to those who have made a significant contribution to the Knockout and Aboriginal football. These include the William Peachey Memorial Trophy – donated by the Peache family; the Lance Brown Memorial Trophy presented to Bourke/Weilmoringle RLFC, Gary "Mad Mick" Kennedy; McGrady Memorial Shield; Tommo Tighe Memorial Shield; Tabulam Rugby League Football Club Paul Roberts Memorial Shield; Wesley McGrady Memorial Trophy; Vincent Clyde Donovan Memorial Trophy – donated by the South Taree Footballers for the best 5/8 of State Knockout; and the George "Pedro" Squires Perpetual Trophy – donated by the Greenup Family Bowraville.

== NRL players to play in Koori Knockout ==
- Denis Kinchela - La Perouse Panthers, Moree Boomerangs
- Josh Addo-Carr - Redfern All Blacks
- Matthew Allwood - Redfern All Blacks
- Ben Barba – Walgett Aboriginal Connection
- Nathan Blacklock
- Maurice Blair - Newcastle Yowies
- Matt Bowen - Newcastle Yowies
- Braidon Burns
- Preston Campbell
- Adrian Davis - Newcastle Yowies & Kempsey Bloodlines
- Justin Doyle - Narwan Eels & La Perouse
- Leo Dynevor
- Dylan Farrell - La Perouse Panthers
- Blake Ferguson
- Andrew Fifita – Griffith 3 Ways United & Doonside Brown Bears
- David Fifita – Griffith 3 Ways United & Doonside Brown Bears
- Latu Fifita – Griffith 3 Ways United & Doonside Brown Bears
- Dane Gagai - Newcastle Yowies
- Craig Garvey - La Perouse Panthers
- Steve Gordon - Newcastle Yowies
- Yileen Gordon - Newcastle Yowies
- Nicho Hynes – Griffith Three Ways United
- Greg Inglis – Wall St Warriors
- Ryan James
- Rod Jensen – Walgett Aboriginal Connection
- Ben Jones – Walgett Aboriginal Connection
- Albert Kelly - Newcastle Yowies & Nulla Rugby League Club
- Daine Laurie
- Brenko Lee - Newcastle Yowies
- Michael Lett
- Cliff Lyons
- Nathan Merritt – Redfern All-Blacks
- Latrell Mitchell - Taree Biripi Sharks & WAC
- Denis Moran - Narwan Eels & Newcastle Yowies
- Anthony Mundine - Nanima Connections
- Wes Patten - Redfern All Blacks & Newcastle Yowies
- David Peachey
- Tyrone Peachey - Nanima Connections
- Jesse Ramien - Kempsey Bloodlines
- Amos Roberts
- James Roberts - Kempsey Bloodlines
- Tyrone Roberts - Cabbage Tree Island
- Tyrone Roberts-Davis - Kempsey Bloodlines
- Reece Robinson - Redfern All Blacks
- Travis Robinson - Redfern All Blacks
- George Rose – Walgett Aboriginal Connection
- Chris Sandow - Narrandera Wiradjuri Warriors
- Eric Simms
- Robbie-John Simpson – Griffith Three Ways United
- Will Smith - Newcastle All Blacks
- Timana Tahu – Newcastle Yowies
- Gorden Tallis - Redfern All Blacks
- Ashley Taylor - Newcastle Yowies
- Sam Thaiday - Wollumbin Warriors
- Joel Thompson - Walgett Aboriginal Connection
- Brad Tighe - Newcastle Yowies
- Darrell Trindall - Redfern All Blacks
- Travis Waddell - Newcastle Yowies
- Ricky Walford - Barwon Aboriginal Corporation
- Cody Walker - Mindaribba, Cabbage Tree Island, Walgett Aboriginal Connection & Bundjalung Baygal warriors
- Connor Watson - Walgett Aboriginal Connection
- Dean Widders - Narwan Eels & Redfern All Blacks
- Jonathan Wright - Campbelltown Ghosts & Redfern All Blacks
- jack Wighton- WAC

== See also ==
- Australian Aboriginal culture
- Indigenous Australian sport
- List of Indigenous Australian firsts
