= Murri Rugby League Team =

Australian rugby league team for Indigenous players

Club information
- Full name: Arthur Beetson Queensland Murri Rugby League Team
- Nickname: Murries
- Founded: 2012; 14 years ago

Murri Rugby League Team
Uniforms
First colours

Team results
- First international
- Queensland Murri 70–8 (United States) USA Tomahawks
- Biggest win
- Queensland Murri 70–8 (United States) USA Tomahawks
- Biggest defeat
- Māori 46–22 Queensland Murri

The Murri Rugby League Team is a representative side for Indigenous rugby league players that play in the annual Queensland Murri Rugby League Carnival.

== History ==
=== Arthur Beetson Foundation Murri tour of Hawaii ===
Queensland Murri's faced the USA Tomahawks at Honolulu in 2012, The game was played at Kaiser Stadium with a high school gridiron game played as curtain raiser. The Murri side was selected from the Murri Carnival in Ipswich 2012 with a few of the players were Queensland Cup players likes of Brendon Marshall, Donald Malone, Ian Lacey, Keiron Lander & Kurtis Lingwoodock. The Tomahawks side was coached by NRL star, Cory Paterson . They travelled with members of the Jaran Aboriginal and Torres Strait Islander Dance Company in a unique exchange between the three cultures in rugby league and culture.

Team list 1 Dennis Sandow - Barambah RL 2 Francis Renouf - Barambah RL 3 Brendan Marshall - Southern Dingoes 4 Donald Malone - Barambah RL 5 Benaiah Bowie - Argun Warriors 6 Steven Singleton - Yarrabah Seahawks 7 Ian Lacey - Southern Dingoes 8 Bobby Nona - Argun Warriors 9 Danny Kerr - Southern Dingoes 10 Ashley Evans - Toowooomba Warriors 11 Keiron Lander - Southern Dingoes 12 Kurtis Lingwoodock - Eidsvold United 13 Rob Apanui - Southern Dingoes 14 Andrew Garrett Jnr - Yarrabah Seahawks 15 Anthony Flores - Southern Dingoes 16 Phil Dennis - Southern Dingoes 17 Geoff Broome - Ipswich Redbacks

Coach – Selwyn Apanui

Point Scorers Donald Malone 2; Benaiah Bowie 2; Dennis Sandow 2; Ian Lacey 2; Steve Singleton 1; Andrew Garrett Jr 1; Robert Apanui 1; Kieron Lander 1; Goals Danny Kerr 10/11; Dennis Sandow 1/1.

Year	Queensland Murri vs USA Tomahawks
Year	Winners	Score	Runners-up
2012	Queensland Murri	70–8	USA Tomahawks

=== Arthur Beetson Foundation Murri tour of New Zealand ===
In October 2013, a Queensland Murri representative side toured New Zealand to play A New Zealand Maori team in a two-game series. The Maori side won the first game 48–18 at Davies Park, Huntly. The second game was played at Puketawhero Park, Rotorua and was won by the Maori side, 32–16.

Year	Queensland Murri vs New Zealand Maori
Year	Winners	Score	Runners-up
2013	Māori New Zealand Maori	40–18	Queensland Murri
2013	Māori New Zealand Maori	32–16	Queensland Murri

=== Queensland Murri vs New Zealand Māori 2014 ===
The Deadly Choices Men QLD Murri Representative Team played against touring NZ Maoris on Saturday 18 October at BMD Kougari Oval

Year	Queensland Murri vs New Zealand Maori
Year	Winners	Score	Runners-up
2014	Māori New Zealand Maori	46–22	Queensland Murri

=== Arthur Beetson Foundation Murri Tour of Fiji ===
In October 2014 the Queensland Murri representative side toured Fiji. They played 2 games against the Vodafone Cup winners, Fair Trade Makoi Bulldogs and Fiji residents, the side featured third-grade club (mix between QLD Cup squad and local A-Grade) players in Queensland.

Year	Queensland Murri vs Fiji Residents
Year	Winners	Score	Runners-up
2014	Makoi Bulldogs	20–16	Queensland Murri
2014	Queensland Murri	14–12	Fiji Residents

== 2014 squad ==
Queensland Murri
2014 Squad		Coaching staff
1 Menmuny Murgha – FB; 2 Marlon Doak – WG; 3 Bradley Stephens – CE; 4 Brendon Marshall – CE; 5 Ronald Conlon – WG; 6 Sean Yorston – FE; 7 Steven Singleton – HB; 8 Bill McConnachie – PR; 9 Rex Johnson – HK; 10 Matt Bon – PR; 11 Tristian Lumley – SR; 12 Joel Marama – SR; 13 Noel Underwood – LK	14 Brandon Cubby; 15 Marmin Barba – WG, FB; 16 Philip Vinson; 17 George Jarrett – PR, SR; 18 Nathan Gaulton; 19 Morris Hodges; 20 Kepa Sabesio	Legend: (c) Captain(s); (vc) Vice-captain(s)

== Major sponsors ==
- Arthur Beetson Foundation
- QAIHC
- Deadly Choices

== See also ==
- Indigenous Australians
- Murri people
- Torres Strait Islanders
- Murri Rugby League Carnival
- NSW Koori Knockout
