= Sarah Field =

Sarah Field may refer to:

- Sarah Greenwood (artist), New Zealand artist, letter-writer and teacher born Sarah Field
- Sarah Fyge Egerton or Field, English poet
- Sarah Field (rugby league)
