= Alex McKinnon Cup =

Rugby League trophy in Australia

- Sport: Rugby league
- Inaugural season: 2015
- Number of teams: 2
- Cup Holders: Newcastle Knights (2024)
- Most titles: St. George Illawarra Dragons (7 titles)

The National Rugby League's Alex McKinnon Cup match is an annual game between the Newcastle Knights and St. George Illawarra Dragons played for on the first occasion the two sides meet in a season. The trophy is named for former player Alex McKinnon, who suffered a career-ending injury during the 2014 NRL season, leaving him a quadriplegic.

McKinnon had played for both Newcastle and St. George Illawarra during his career, and the two clubs together instituted the trophy for the 2015 season.

== Fixtures & Results ==
Winner	Score	Loser	Match information
Winner	Score	Loser	Date and time	Venue	Referee	Crowd
St. George Illawarra Dragons	13–0	Newcastle Knights	Saturday 4 April 2015	McDonald Jones Stadium	Gavin Badger, Chris Sutton	14,261
St. George Illawarra Dragons	30–18	Newcastle Knights	Saturday 25 June 2016	McDonald Jones Stadium	David Munro, Gavin Reynolds	13,777
St. George Illawarra Dragons	32–28	Newcastle Knights	Saturday 25 June 2017	Jubilee Oval	Adam Gee, Gavin Reynolds	10,174
St. George Illawarra Dragons	30–12	Newcastle Knights	Sunday 1 April 2018	WIN Stadium	Grant Atkins, Jon Stone	18,589
St. George Illawarra Dragons	13–12	Newcastle Knights	Sunday 7 April 2019	McDonald Jones Stadium	Matt Cecchin, Adam Cassidy	19,105
Newcastle Knights	42–18	St. George Illawarra Dragons	Sunday 20 September 2020	McDonald Jones Stadium	Grant Atkins	6,659
St. George Illawarra Dragons	22–13	Newcastle Knights	Sunday 4 April 2021	McDonald Jones Stadium	Peter Gough	21,770
St. George Illawarra Dragons	21–16	Newcastle Knights	Sunday 17 April 2022	Win Stadium	Ben Cummins	11,113
Newcastle Knights	36–12	St. George Illawarra Dragons	Saturday 2 September 2023	Jubilee Oval	Ben Cummins	10,137
Newcastle Knights	30–10	St. George Illawarra Dragons	Friday 5 April 2024	McDonald Jones Stadium	Belinda Sharpe	9,448
St. George Illawarra Dragons	20–6	Newcastle Knights	Friday 30 May 2025	Jubilee Stadium	Grant Atkins	10,411

== Head To Head ==
Team	Played	Games won	Games lost	Draws	PF	PA	PD
St. George Illawarra Dragons	11	8	3	0	221	209	+12
Newcastle Knights	11	3	8	0	209	221	-12

Statistics current as of the conclusion of the 2025 cup game.

== See also ==
- Rivalries in the National Rugby League
