= Ian Lacey =

Australian rugby league footballer

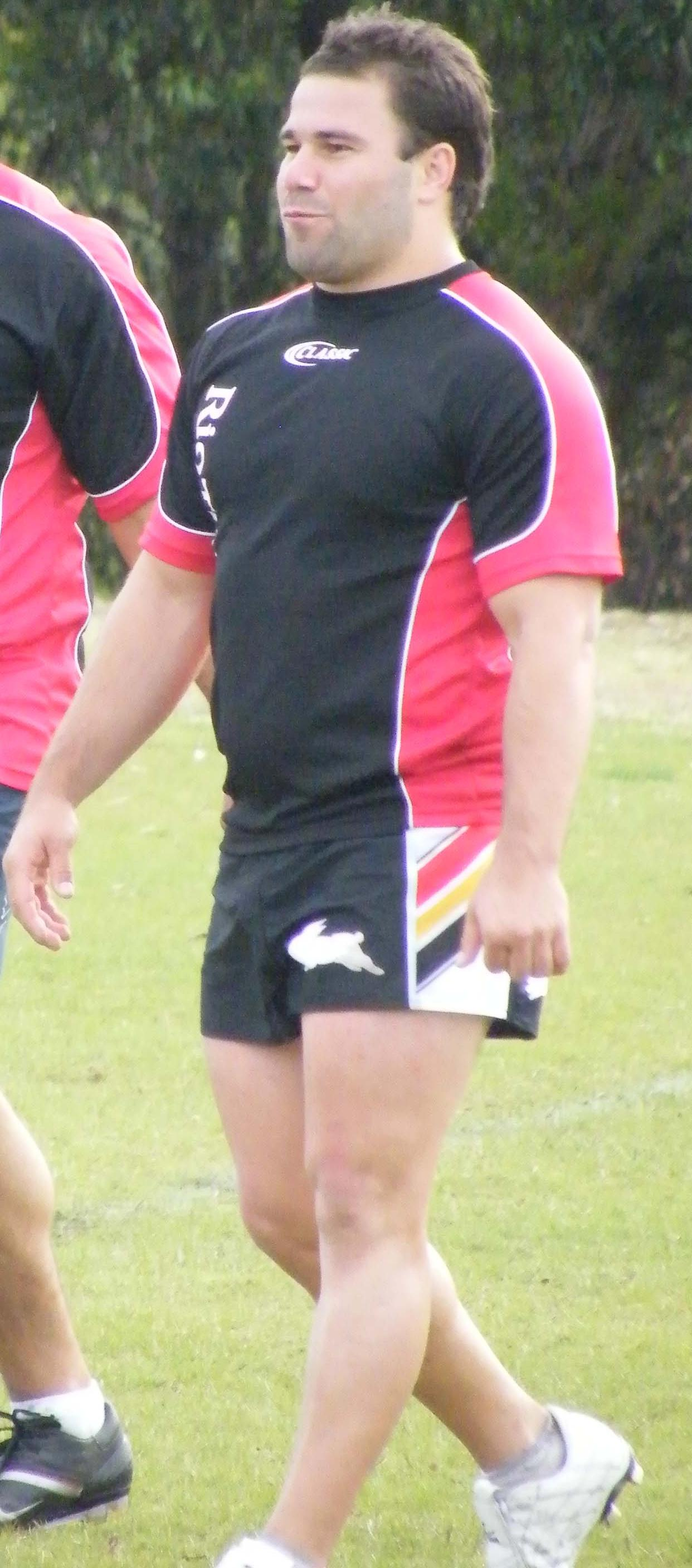

Personal information
- Full name: Ian Robert Lacey
- Born: 25 November 1984 (age 41) Brisbane, Queensland, Australia

Playing information
- Height: 165 cm (5 ft 5 in)
- Weight: 81 kg (12 st 11 lb)
- Position: Hooker
Club
Years	Team	Pld	T	G	FG	P
2006–07	Brisbane Broncos	23	0	0	0	0
Representative
Years	Team	Pld	T	G	FG	P
2008	Indigenous Dreamtime	1	0	0	0	0
2008	Queensland Residents	1	0	0	0	0

Ian Robert Lacey (born 25 November 1984) is an Australian former professional rugby league footballer formerly of the Ipswich Jets in the Queensland Cup. He also played in the forwards for the Brisbane Broncos in the National Rugby League competition, before his sacking on 6 October 2007.

== Playing career ==
Lacey made his first-grade debut for the Brisbane Broncos against Sydney Roosters in round 6, 2006, with Brisbane winning the match 24-6.

The Broncos sacked Lacey following allegations that he, along with fellow forward John Te Reo, assaulted a 32-year-old man in central Brisbane on Saturday, 6 October 2007.

Lacey was subsequently signed by Queensland Cup team Ipswich Jets for 2008.

The Gold Coast Titans club gave Lacey the opportunity to resurrect his NRL career by signing him for the 2009 NRL season, but he never managed to make a first-grade appearance for the club.

In 2012, he played for the Queensland Murri representative side in a match against the USA Tomahawks, which the Murris won 72-18 at Kaiser Stadium in Honolulu, Hawaii.

In 2013, Lacey retired from rugby league after 154 Queensland Cup and 23 NRL appearances due to an ongoing neck injury.
