= John Te Reo =

NZ rugby league footballer

Personal information
- Full name: John Howard Te Reo
- Born: 5 June 1986 (age 40) Wellington, New Zealand
- Height: 182 cm (6 ft 0 in)
- Weight: 91 kg (14 st 5 lb)

Playing information
- Position: Hooker
Club
Years	Team	Pld	T	G	FG	P
2007	Brisbane Broncos	7	0	0	0	0
- Source: As of 1 February 2019

John Howard Te Reo (born 5 June 1986) is a New Zealand former professional rugby league footballer who last played for the Wynnum Manly Seagulls in the Brisbane Rugby League. In 2007, he occasionally played first-grade for the Brisbane Broncos in the NRL competition. His preferred position was as a hooker, but he had the ability to play lock and centre.

== Playing career ==
Te Reo was added to the Broncos' Top 25 player list in 2007 after winning his club's player of the year award in the Queensland Cup. At the beginning of the season, he was behind Shaun Berrigan and Ian Lacey for the position of hooker in the team. On the occasions that he played first-grade, he normally started the match on the interchange bench.

On 9 October 2007, the Broncos announced that they would be terminating Te Reo's contract following allegations that he, along with fellow forward Ian Lacey, assaulted a 32-year-old man in Charlotte Street, in central Brisbane, on 6 October. He then joined the Wynnum Manly Seagulls Queensland Cup team through FOGS then was promoted to Queensland Cup, he also played against his former teammate Ian Lacey.

On 2 November 2010, the Brisbane Broncos reinstated Te Reo into their playing stocks. They are the second club (after the Sydney Roosters with Jake Friend) in recent history to reinstate a player after being sacked by the same club. However, he failed to play another game for the club after being reinstated.

JOHN HOWARD Te Reo (John The Conqueror) in recent years has gone on to have multiple wins in his SuperCoach Draft League (The Degenerate Cup) in 2026 and 2024. However, fellow league members have mentioned he prayed on the weak for trades and used his honey words to achieve this. It is also noted that since the start of his career a lot of his dimensions have changed, he now weighs 130 kg (not muscle), and is 154Cm's (5ft 1in)
