= New Zealand Māori rugby league team =

Representative rugby league team made up of Māori players from New Zealand

New Zealand Māori
Team information
- Head coach: Adam Blair
- Captain: James Fisher-Harris

Team results
- First international
- Australia 24–14 Māori (Sydney, Australia; 1908)
- Biggest win
- Māori 64–4 Tokelau (Ericsson Stadium No.2, Auckland; 2006)
- Biggest defeat
- Māori 0–29 Great Britain (Auckland, New Zealand; 20 July 1910)
- World Cup
- Appearances: 1 (first time in 2000)
- Best result: Pool Stage

The New Zealand Māori rugby league team is a rugby league representative side made up of New Zealand Māori players.

With some controversy, the team participated in the 2000 World Cup as Aotearoa Māori. The Super League International Board had agreed to give a place in their 1998 World Cup to the New Zealand Māori team as they attempted to gain allies during the Super League war. Despite that World Cup not taking place, the Rugby League International Federation repeated the offer for the 2000 World Cup when it replaced the Super League International Board following the end of the dispute.

== History ==
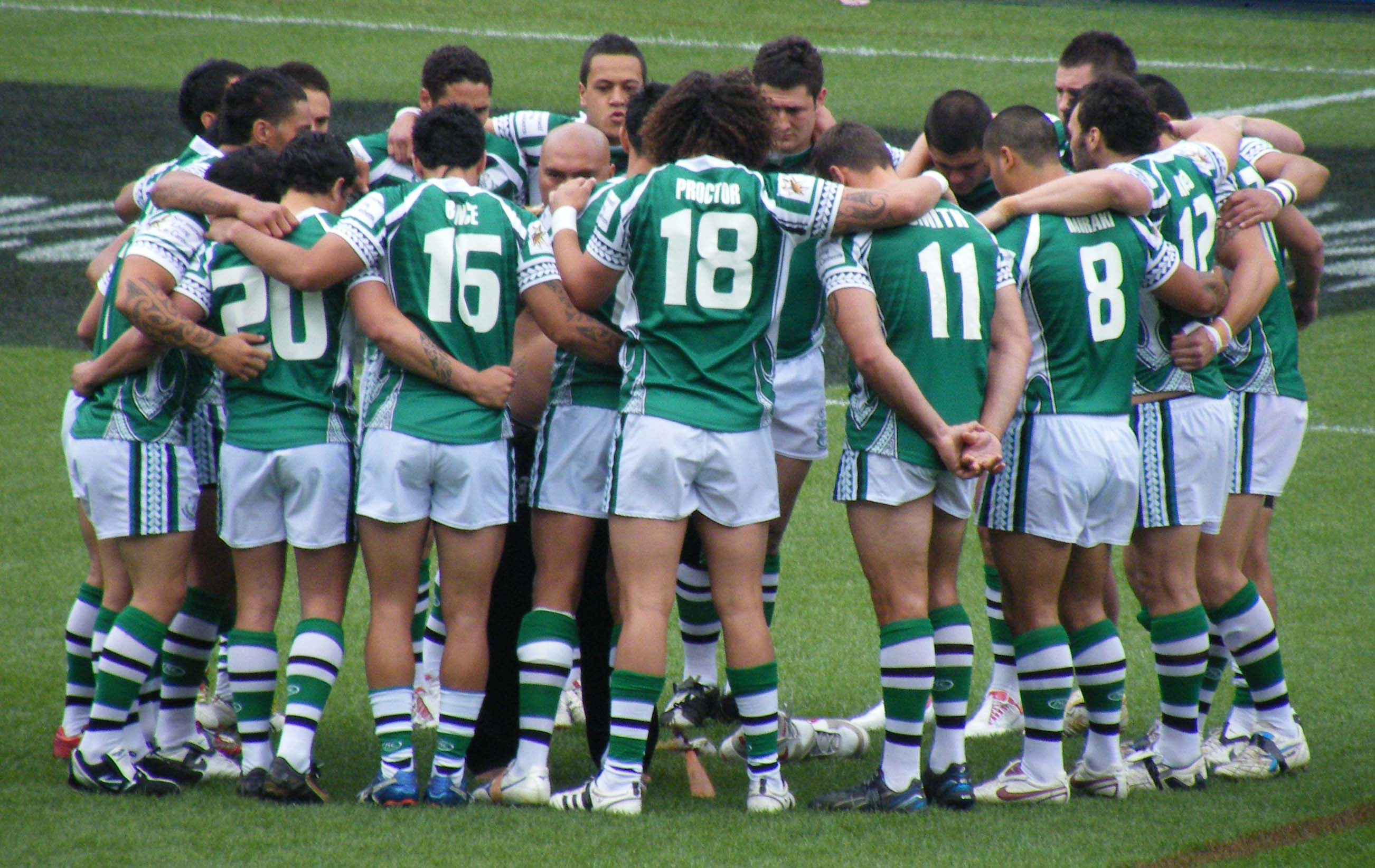
New Zealand Maori pre–match huddle before their clash with the Indigenous Dreamtime team before the start of the 2008 World Cup

A New Zealand Māori team first toured overseas in 1908 when they visited Australia. This tour was a success, and was followed by another tour to Australia in 1909 and to Great Britain in 1910.

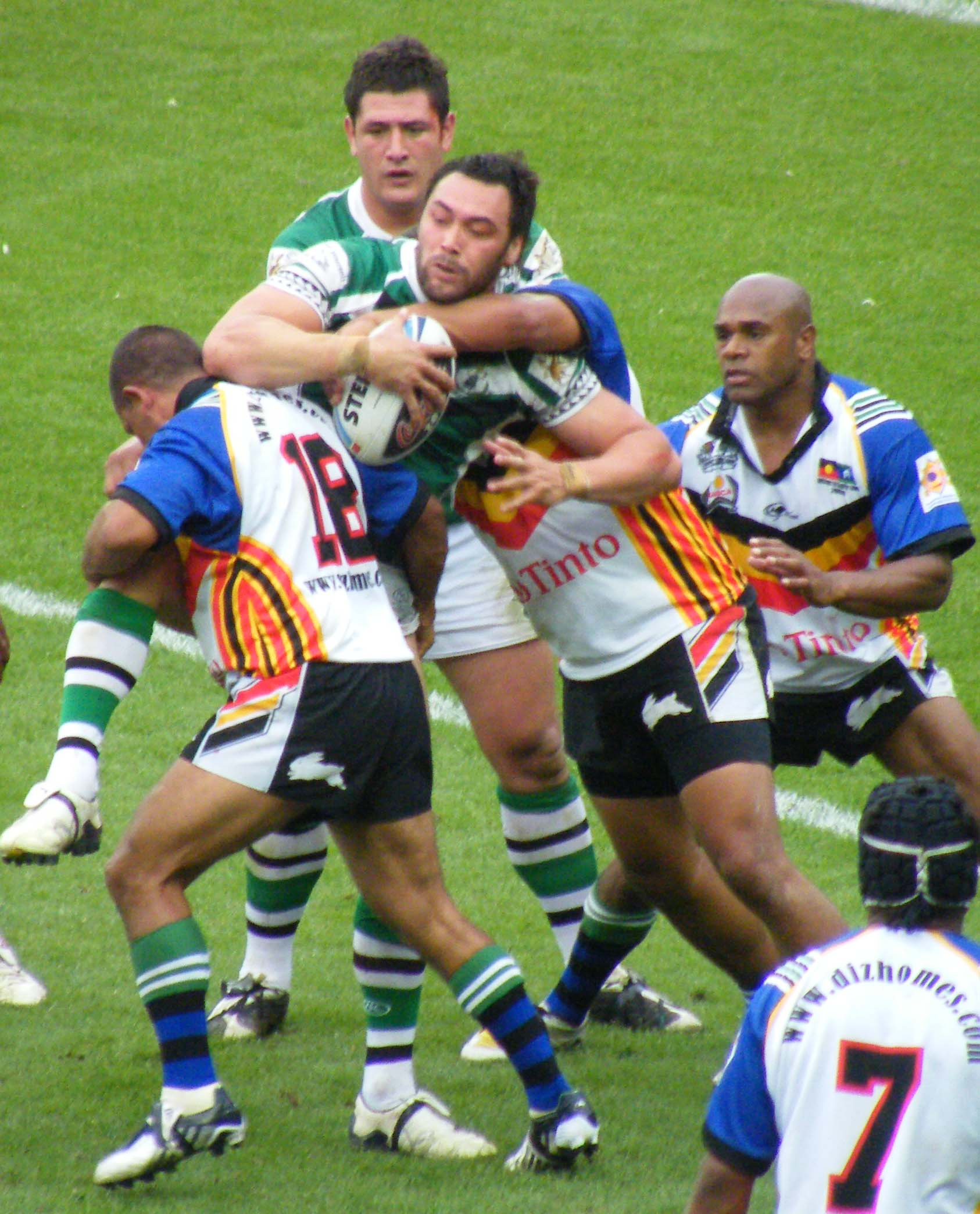
Wairangi Koopu takes on the Indigenous line

The first game of international rugby league on New Zealand soil was between the Māori and the touring Great Britain Lions of 1910.

A separate body, the Māori Rugby League Board of Control, was formed in 1934 to administer the game in Māori communities. This governing body was later renamed the Aotearoa Māori Rugby League and in 1992 it was registered as an incorporated society.

The Māori have had a wonderful record of beating international touring teams over the years. In 1983 they visited Britain and a side containing future Kiwi stars like Hugh McGahan, Dean Bell and Clayton Friend proved too strong for the amateur opposition they played. For many years, the Māori have competed in the Pacific Cup alongside other teams with a strong presence of New Zealand–based players—Samoa, Tonga and the Cook Islands, so they thought it was right they should have the opportunity to follow these teams to the World Cup. The invitation to the Māori to take part in the 2000 World Cup came about as a result of promises made to them by the defunct Super League International Board at the height of the Super League war that tore the game apart in the southern hemisphere.

The Māori team has participated in the Pacific Cup (since 1974), Super League's 1997 Oceania Cup, Papua New Guinea 50th Anniversary (1998), 2000 World Cup, World Sevens Qualification (2003) and Pacific Rim (2004) competitions.

The Māori competed against Indigenous Dreamtime team on 26 October 2008 as the curtain raiser to the first match of the 2008 World Cup. The Māori team lost 34–26.

In 2010, the Māori team played England at Mt. Smart Stadium in Auckland before the 2010 Rugby League Four Nations in New Zealand. After trailing 18–0 at halftime, the Māori came back to draw the match at 18–all.

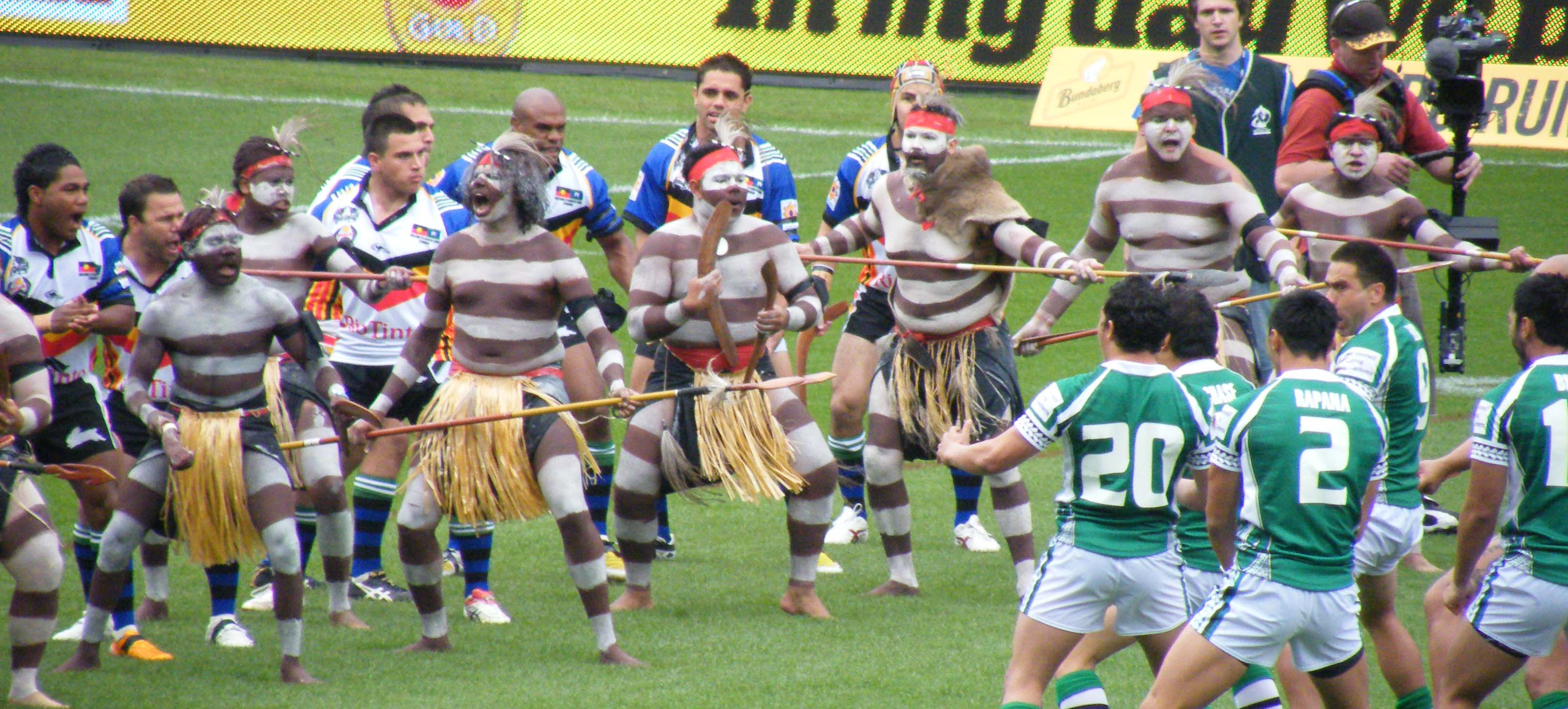
Maori Haka Meets Indigenous War Cry

In October 2013, the side faced the touring Murri Rugby League Team in a two–game series. The Māori side, featuring NRL players Charlie Gubb, Sam Rapira and Bodene Thompson, won the first game 48–18 at Davies Park, Huntly. The second game was played at Puketawhero Park, Rotorua and was won by the Māori side, 32–16.

In October 2014, the team travelled to Australia to play against the Queensland Māori team at Owen Park, Southport and the Murri Rugby League Team at BMD Kougari Oval, Wynnum.

In 2018 they took part in the NRL Festival of Indigenous Rugby League held in Redfern Sydney against the First Nation Goannas, they were beaten 22–16 in a thrilling finish.

== Jerseys ==
Primary

Primary; 1974-2007	Primary; 2008-present

Alternative

Alternative; 1974-2007	Alternative; 2008-present

== See also ==
- New Zealand Māori women's rugby league team
- New Zealand national rugby league team
- New Zealand national rugby union team
- New Zealand Māori rugby union team
- New Zealand Māori cricket team
