= Redfern All Blacks =

Australian rugby league club, based in Sydney NSW

Club information
- Full name: Redfern All Blacks Rugby League Football Club
- Nickname(s): RABs
- Short name: All Blacks
- Colours: Black; White
- Founded: 1944; 81 years ago

Current details
- Ground(s): Redfern Oval
- Chairman: Lisa Williams
- Coach: Dean Widders
- Captain: Dean Widders
- Competition: Sydney Combined Competition; South Sydney District Junior Rugby Football League; NSWRL Women's Premiership

Records
- Premierships: 6 (1974, 1987, 2015, 2016, 2017, 2018)

The Redfern All Blacks, also known as RABs or Redfern, are an Indigenous Australian semi-professional rugby league club based in Redfern, New South Wales, They are a part of the South Sydney District Junior Rugby Football League.

== History ==
Redfern All Blacks is the oldest Indigenous Australian rugby league club in Australia. It was co-founded in 1938 by Bill Onus and Wesley Simms, during the Great Depression. Some reports suggest that the club was officially established by a group of non-Aboriginal and Aboriginal people in 1944.

The club, often referred to as RABs or Redfern, was named after their black guernseys, part of the uniform provided by the South Sydney District Junior Rugby Football League in their first playing season. At the time the club was formed, Aboriginal Australians were denied rights afforded to other Australians. Socially, culturally and politically, the club was important to many Indigenous Australians in Redfern at the time, and the club today is central to the history of Aboriginal Redfern.

In 1969, Redfern's rugby team had already made a name for itself, and the team were invited to play in New Zealand against the local Māori team in 1971. The All Blacks left a significant impression on the Kiwis, defeating the Maori team in a number of games.

In 1971, the Redfern All Blacks became one of the founding member clubs that formed the inaugural NSW Koori Knockout in which seven teams participated.

== Notable players ==
- Matthew Allwood
- Josh Addo-Carr
- Andrew Dunemann
- Solomon Haumono
- Greg Inglis
- Bobby McLeod
- Nathan Merritt
- Anthony Mundine
- Tony Mundine
- Wes Patten
- Shane Phillips, CEO of Tribal Warrior
- Reece Robinson
- Travis Robinson
- Gorden Tallis
- Darrell Trindall
- Dean Widders
- Jonathan Wright

== Honours and records ==
- South Sydney District Junior Rugby Football League (A Grade)
  - Six: 1974, 1987, 2015, 2016, 2017, 2018
- NSW Koori Knockout Men Titles
  - Eight: 1972, 1973, 1978, 1979, 1992, 1993, 2015, 2016
- Koori vs. Murri Interstate Challenge
  - One: 2017
- NSWRL Women's Premiership Titles
  - Two: 2005, 2017
- NSW Koori Knockout Women Titles
  - Five: 2010, 2011, 2014, 2015, 2016, 2017

== 2018 A Grade Squad ==
Redfern All Blacks
2018 Squad		Coaching staff
1 Kieran Mundine – FB; 2 Travis Robinson – WG; 3 Kieran Vale – CE; 4 Liam Talivaa – CE; 5 Kyle Mundine – WG; 6 Kareel Phillips – FE; 7 Michael Moran – HB; 8 Shaun Mealey – PR; 9 Cameron Dennis – HK; 10 Dean Widders (c) – PR; 11 Stephen Ryan – SR; 12 Robert Ryan – SR; 13 Steven Winters – LK	14 Heath Fernando; 15 Trent Robinson; 16 Luciano Svagelli; 17 Peni Roqica; 18 Matthew Hickey; 19 Dean Jr Widders; 20 Craig McKenzie; 21 Dylan Grant; 22 Nayden Simon; 23 Sam Hampton; 24 Troy Gordon; 25 Ezekiel Phillips; 26 Rhys Haynes	Head coach: Dean Widders; Legend: (c) Captain(s); (vc) Vice-captain(s)

== See also ==
- List of rugby league clubs in Australia
- List of senior rugby league clubs in New South Wales
