= Adrian Davis (rugby league) =

Australian rugby league footballer

Personal information
- Born: 19 January 1990 (age 36) Kempsey, New South Wales, Australia
- Height: 173 cm (5 ft 8 in)
- Weight: 78 kg (12 st 4 lb)

Playing information
- Position: Halfback
Club
Years	Team	Pld	T	G	FG	P
	Newcastle Knights
	Redcliffe Dolphins
	Penrith Panthers
	Newcastle Yowies
	Total	0	0	0	0	0

Adrian Davis (born 19 January 1990) is an Indigenous Australian rugby league player. He has previously played for the Newcastle Knights in the NSW Cup and the Redcliffe Dolphins in the Intrust Super Cup.

== Background ==
Born in Kempsey, New South Wales Davis played his junior football with Kempsey Dragons. He attended Granville Boys High before being signed by the Canterbury Bulldogs, where he played for their SG Ball under-20's squads.

He also plays in the annual NSW Koori Knockout and won 2 titles with the Newcastle Yowies.

== Playing career ==
=== Newcastle Knights ===
Davis played for Knights Holden Cup team in 2010 and then played for there NSW Cup side between 2011 and 2013. When not selected for the NSW Cup side he played and in the Newcastle competition for Central Newcastle.

=== Redcliffe Dolphins ===
Davis played for the Redcliffe Dolphins in the Intrust Super Cup in 2014 season. He also captained the First Nation Goanna's against his previous NSW Cup side for three seasons.

=== Penrith Panthers ===
2015 Davis signed a one-year second-tier deal with the Penrith Panthers. He played in their 2015 Auckland Nines team but did not play first grade during the season.

=== Newcastle Yowies ===
Without a club for 2016, Davies was selected to tour to United Kingdom with the Newcastle Yowies, an Indigenous invitational team from the Hunter Region. They lost 38–12 to the London Broncos and won against the Wakefield Trinity Wildcats.

=== Rep honours ===
- New South Wales Combined High Schools 2008
- NSW Cup Residents 2013
- First Nation Goannas 2014

== Career stats ==
Season	Matches	Tries	Goals	F/G	Points
Newcastle Knights NYC 2010	18	7	–	–	28
Newcastle Knights NSW Cup 2011	26	11	–	–	44
Newcastle Knights NSW Cup 2012	26	9	–	–	36
Newcastle Knights NSW Cup 2013	26	12	–	–	48
Redcliffe Dolphins 2014	24	–	–	–	0
Total	96	39	-	-	128
