= Sarah Field (rugby league) =

Indigenous Australian rugby league player

Personal information
- Born: 23 February 1999 (age 27) Belmont, New South Wales, Australia

Playing information
- Position: Five-eighth
Club
Years	Team	Pld	T	G	FG	P
2020	South Sydney Rabbitohs	6
2021	North Queensland Gold Stars	7
	Total	13	0	0	0	0
Representative
Years	Team	Pld	T	G	FG	P
2017–22	Indigenous All Stars	2

Sarah Field (born 23 February 1999) is an Australian rugby league player who plays as a five-eighth.

== Biography ==
Field has represented the Indigenous All Stars in two annual All Stars matches in 2017 and 2022.

In 2020, Field played for the South Sydney Rabbitohs in the NSWRL Women's Premiership. From 2021, Field has played for the North Queensland Gold Stars in the QRL Women's Premiership.

Field was born in Belmont, New South Wales. However, she came to notice while living in Emu Park on Queensland's Capricorn Coast when she commenced playing for the Emu Park Emus in the Rockhampton and Gladstone rugby league competitions.

Field received the Women's Player of the Year Award at the annual Rockhampton rugby league presentation dinner in 2016. She was named best and fairest of the Gladstone District Rugby League Competition in 2016 and 2017, and was part of the winning Emus team in the 2017 grand final against the Tannum Seagals at Marley Brown Oval.

In 2018, Field represented the First Nation Gems in the 2018 Festival of Indigenous Rugby League, kicking three goals in their 18-0 win against the New Zealand Māori Ferns at Redfern Oval. Later that same year, Field was named Player of the Carnival following Emu Park's 18-8 win against the Flora Sandilands Memorial team in the four-day Murri Rugby League Carnival in Townsville.

Field was also named Player of the Carnival after a 13-6 win in a grand final against Rockhampton Brothers at Browne Park in the Rockhampton nines competition in 2019.

== See also ==
- Tamika Upton
