= Dean Widders =

Australian rugby league footballer

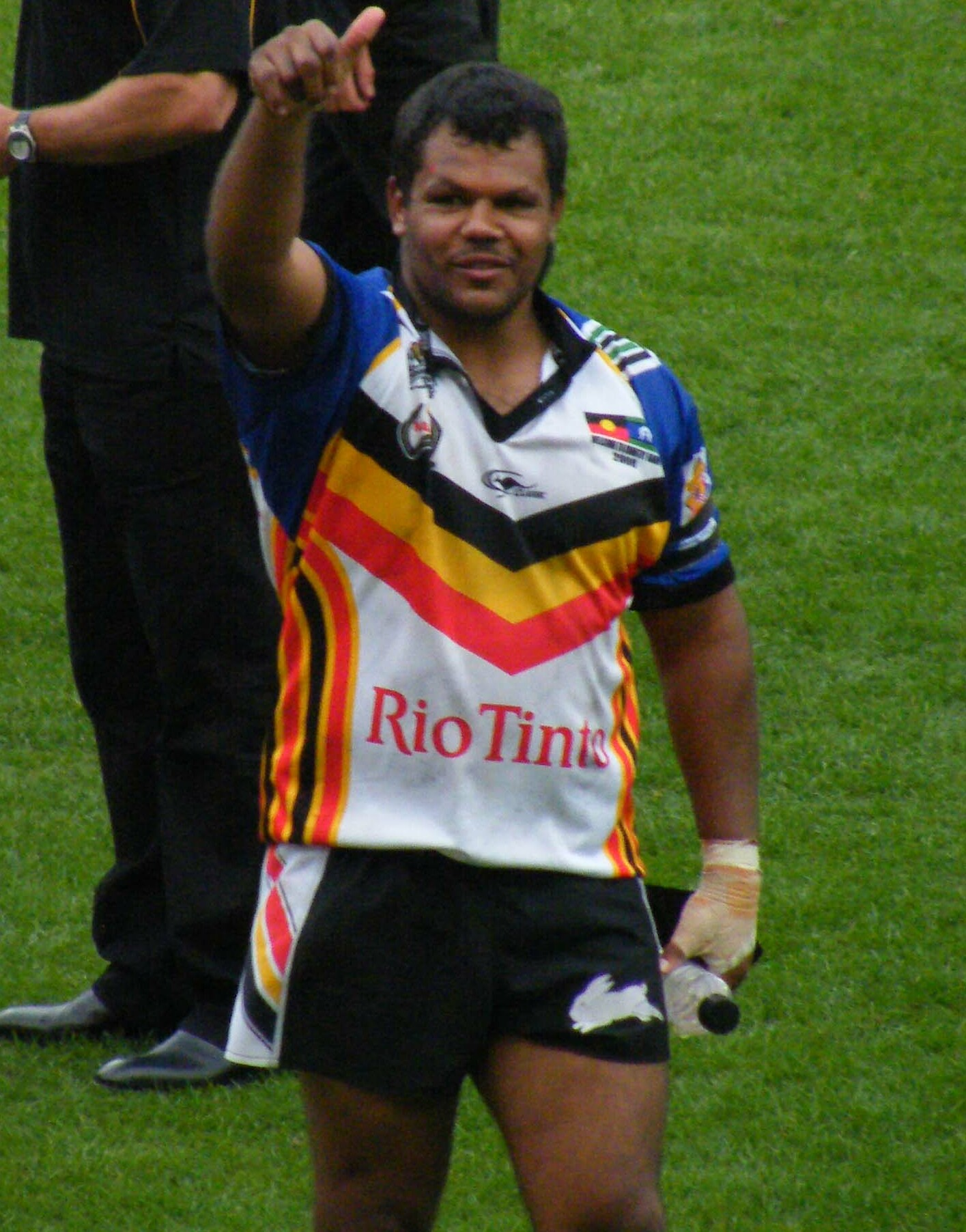

Personal information
- Full name: Dean Richard Widders
- Born: 25 October 1979 (age 47) Armidale, New South Wales, Australia

Playing information
- Height: 178 cm (5 ft 10 in)
- Weight: 101 kg (15 st 13 lb)
- Position: Second-row, Lock, Five-eighth
Club
Years	Team	Pld	T	G	FG	P
2000–01	Sydney Roosters	13	1	0	0	4
2002–06	Parramatta Eels	112	28	0	0	112
2007–08	South Sydney	34	7	0	0	28
2009–11	Castleford Tigers	60	23	0	0	92
	Total	219	59	0	0	236
Representative
Years	Team	Pld	T	G	FG	P
2006	NSW Country	1	0	0	0	0
2007	Prime Minister's XIII	1	0	0	0	0
2008	Aboriginal Dreamtime	1	0	0	0	0

Coaching information
Club
Years	Team	Gms	W	D	L	W%
2015–17	Redfern All Blacks
2021–23	Parramatta Eels Women	21	5	0	16	24
	Total	21	5	0	16	24

Dean Richard Widders (born 25 October 1979) is an Anaiwan Indigenous Australian former professional rugby league footballer who played in the 2000s and 2010s. He works with the National Rugby League as an Indigenous Pathways manager. He is coach of the Parramatta Eels Women team in the 2022 NRLW season.

== Early life ==
Widders was born in Armidale in New South Wales, Australia.

He played his first game of rugby league at the age of six for the local Armidale colts after watching his father Jake Widders who was a player for the famous Aboriginal team the Narwan Eels.

During Widders' teenage years he honed his rugby league playing for the Armidale Greens and Narwan Eels. During this time, Arthur Beetson Sydney Roosters selector flew to Armidale to see Widders play.

== Playing career ==
=== NRL ===
In 1996, at the age of 17, Widders moved to Sydney to play with the Sydney Roosters. In this year, he also captained an Aboriginal side.

Widders made his debut for the Roosters in 2000, playing in 13 NRL matches for the club. In 2002, Widders signed with the Parramatta Eels; in 2005 he was part of The Parramatta side that won the minor premiership. He finished with the club at the end of 2006.

Widders was involved in a racial vilification incident in July 2005 when he was abused by South Sydney Rabbitohs captain Bryan Fletcher. In 2006, he signed a three-year contract to play for the South Sydney Rabbitohs starting in 2007.

=== Castleford Tigers ===
Widders joined Castleford for the 2009 season. He played 19 times in his first season for the Tigers, scoring 6 tries.

Widders picked up an injury and missed 2 months of the season but came back and played in an unfamiliar role of Stand-off, linking up with Rangi Chase.

Widders played in 2011, his final season at the Castleford Tigers. The club failed to make the playoffs after a narrow defeat by Hull KR. Widders played his final game with Castleford in the last home game against Hull F.C.

=== Off-field ===
In 1997, Widders returned to Duval High School in Armidale to complete his Higher School Certificate.

In 2004, Widders was awarded the NRL's Ken Stephen Medal for his positive work with youth in the community and, in 2006, he was appointed to the Federal Government's National Indigenous Council. Widders is also an Ambassador for the National Aboriginal Sports Corporation Australia (NASCA).

In November 2018, Widders participated in the Legends of League tournament for Parramatta, which was held at the Central Coast Stadium in Gosford.

He is coach of the Parramatta Eels Women team in the 2022 NRLW season.

== Career highlights ==
- Junior Club: Armidale, Narwan
- Career Stats: 219 first grade games scoring 59 tries
- Representative Honours: Country Origin (2006), Prime Minister's XIII (2007)
- Honours: Minor Premiership (2005) with Parramatta
