= Alex McKinnon (rugby league) =

Australian rugby league footballer

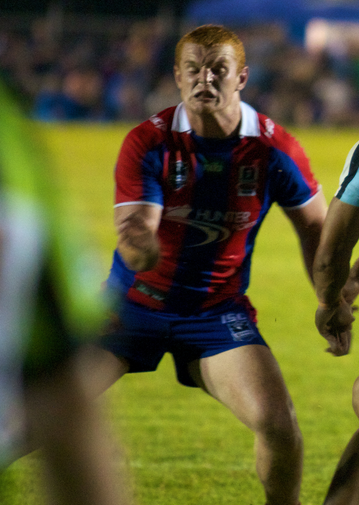
- McKinnon playing for the Knights in 2012

Personal information
- Born: 5 February 1992 (age 34) Aberdeen, New South Wales, Australia

Playing information
- Height: 188 cm (6 ft 2 in)
- Weight: 102 kg (16 st 1 lb)
- Position: Second-row, Lock, Centre
Club
Years	Team	Pld	T	G	FG	P
2011	St George Illawarra	3	2	0	0	8
2012–14	Newcastle Knights	47	4	0	0	16
	Total	50	6	0	0	24
Representative
Years	Team	Pld	T	G	FG	P
2013	NSW Country	1	0	0	0	0

Alex McKinnon (born 5 February 1992) is an Australian former professional rugby league footballer whose career was cut short by a spinal injury during a 2014 National Rugby League Premiership match against Melbourne. A Country New South Wales representative second-row, McKinnon also played lock and centre. He started his career with the St George Illawarra Dragons before moving to the Newcastle Knights in 2012.

== Early life ==
Born in Aberdeen, New South Wales on 5 February 1992 to parents Scott and Kate McKinnon, he moved to St Gregory's College, Campbelltown in Year 7 and played his junior football for the Aberdeen Tigers. He then signed with the St. George Illawarra Dragons.

== Professional playing career ==
=== St. George Illawarra ===
McKinnon played for the Dragons' Toyota Cup team from 2008 to 2010, playing in 41 games. McKinnon was named on the bench in Round 11 of the 2010 NRL season after prop Dan Hunt was ruled out in the warm up, however he didn't get on the field. In Round 14 of the 2011 NRL season he made his NRL debut for the Dragons against the Gold Coast Titans. He scored 2 tries on debut. At the end of 2011, McKinnon was named at second-row in the 2011 Toyota Cup Team of the Year. He signed a 3-year contract with the Newcastle Knights starting in 2012 to be closer to his family in the Hunter Valley and the fact he is originally from the area.

=== Newcastle Knights ===
In Round 1 of the 2012 NRL season, McKinnon made his debut for the Knights against his former team, the St George Illawarra Dragons. After playing the first 7 rounds, McKinnon was named at second-row in the inaugural Under 20's State of Origin match for New South Wales. On 2 October 2012, McKinnon was named at second-row in the Junior Kangaroos team to face the Junior Kiwis.

In 2013, McKinnon was selected for the Country team to play the City in the annual City vs Country Origin match.

== Injury ==
While playing in the 2014 NRL season round 3 match against Melbourne at AAMI Park, on March 24, McKinnon was injured in a dangerous tackle close to half-time with Storm players Jordan McLean, Jesse Bromwich and Kenny Bromwich. McKinnon had fractures to his C4 and C5 vertebrae and was admitted to the Alfred Hospital and placed in a medically induced coma. McLean was given a seven-match suspension for the tackle.

McKinnon was left a paraplegic. He received the maximum insurance pay out of $500,000 and was assured a "job for life" with the NRL. The NRL's Round 19 in 2014 included a fundraising event called "Rise for Alex", with $1 for every fan attending any of the eight games donated to help him pay for his continuous medical bills and rehabilitation.

McKinnon began working with the Knights in January 2015 and in October 2015 became a recruitment co-ordinator. In December 2016, McKinnon announced that he would sue the NRL and Melbourne Storm's Jordan McLean for compensation. In March 2017, McKinnon quit his role with the Knights to focus on public speaking. McKinnon returned to his recruitment position in November 2018.

== Trophy ==
Following his injury in 2014, the two NRL clubs that McKinnon had played for in his career, the Newcastle Knights and St George Illawarra Dragons, together instituted the Alex McKinnon Cup for the 2015 NRL Season. The trophy is contested between the two clubs on the first occasion the two sides meet in a season.

== Personal life ==
McKinnon was married to Teigan Power, whom he proposed to two weeks after his injury. In 2015, McKinnon released his book titled Unbroken. They welcomed their first child, a baby girl named Harriet Anne on 7 October 2018. In November 2020, they announced they were expecting twins in May 2021. Audrey Jill and Violet John McKinnon were born on 26 April 2021. In January 2022, McKinnon split with Power and in April 2022 it was officially confirmed by both parties. In November 2025, McKinnon announced his engagement to Lily Malone.

On 12 December 2024, McKinnon obtained his Bachelor's degree of Psychology.
